= Cedric Clarke =

Former Labour councillor

Leeds City Councillor for Chapel Allerton Ward
- In office 1980–1990
- Succeeded by: Norma Hutchinson

Personal details
- Party: Labour

Cedric Clarke is a retired British Labour politician. He was the first black Leeds City Councillor, serving from 1980 to 1990 and was made an Honorary Alderman of Leeds in 2016

== Career ==
Clarke was elected to represent the Chapel Allerton ward in 1980, becoming the first African-Caribbean councillor in Leeds. He was involved with a number of council initiatives, for example chairing the Equal Opportunities Committee for Leeds City Council. Within three years of being elected, Clarke and his fellow-councillors introduced 220 new houses to the area, consistent street-cleaning, homes for the elderly, new nursery units and support for small businesses. Despite these achievements he lost his seat on Leeds City Council in 1990.

== Honours ==
In 2016, Clarke was appointed an Honorary Alderman of Leeds in recognition of his work in the city.

== Personal life ==
Prior to his election as a councillor, Clarke worked as a plasterer and lived in Chapeltown with his wife and three children. Active in the local community, Clarke volunteered with probation services and was a trainee preacher at Roscoe Methodist Church. He established the United Caribbean Association, along with the founder of Leeds West Indian Carnival, Arthur France.

== See also ==
- Alison Lowe
- Leeds West Indian Carnival
