= Potternewton =

Suburb of Leeds, West Yorkshire, England

Coordinates: 53°49′13″N 1°32′00″W

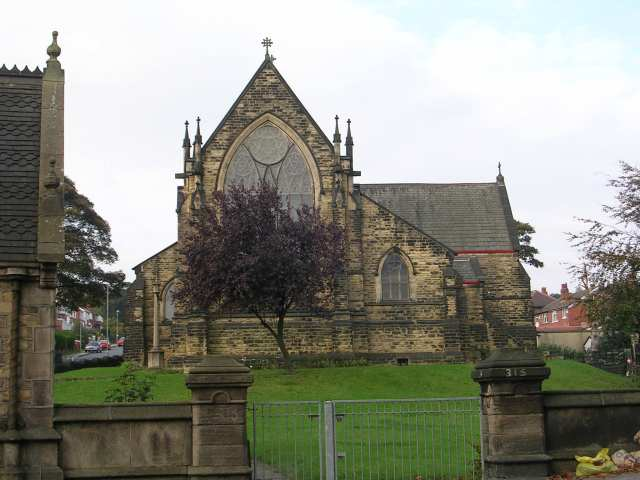
- St Martin's Church, Potternewton

- Location within West Yorkshire
- Metropolitan borough: Leeds
- Metropolitan county: West Yorkshire
- Region: Yorkshire and the Humber
- Country: England
- Sovereign state: United Kingdom
- Police: West Yorkshire
- Fire: West Yorkshire
- Ambulance: Yorkshire

Potternewton also Potter Newton is a suburb and parish between Chapeltown and Chapel Allerton in north-east Leeds, West Yorkshire, England. It is in the Chapel Allerton ward of Leeds City Council.

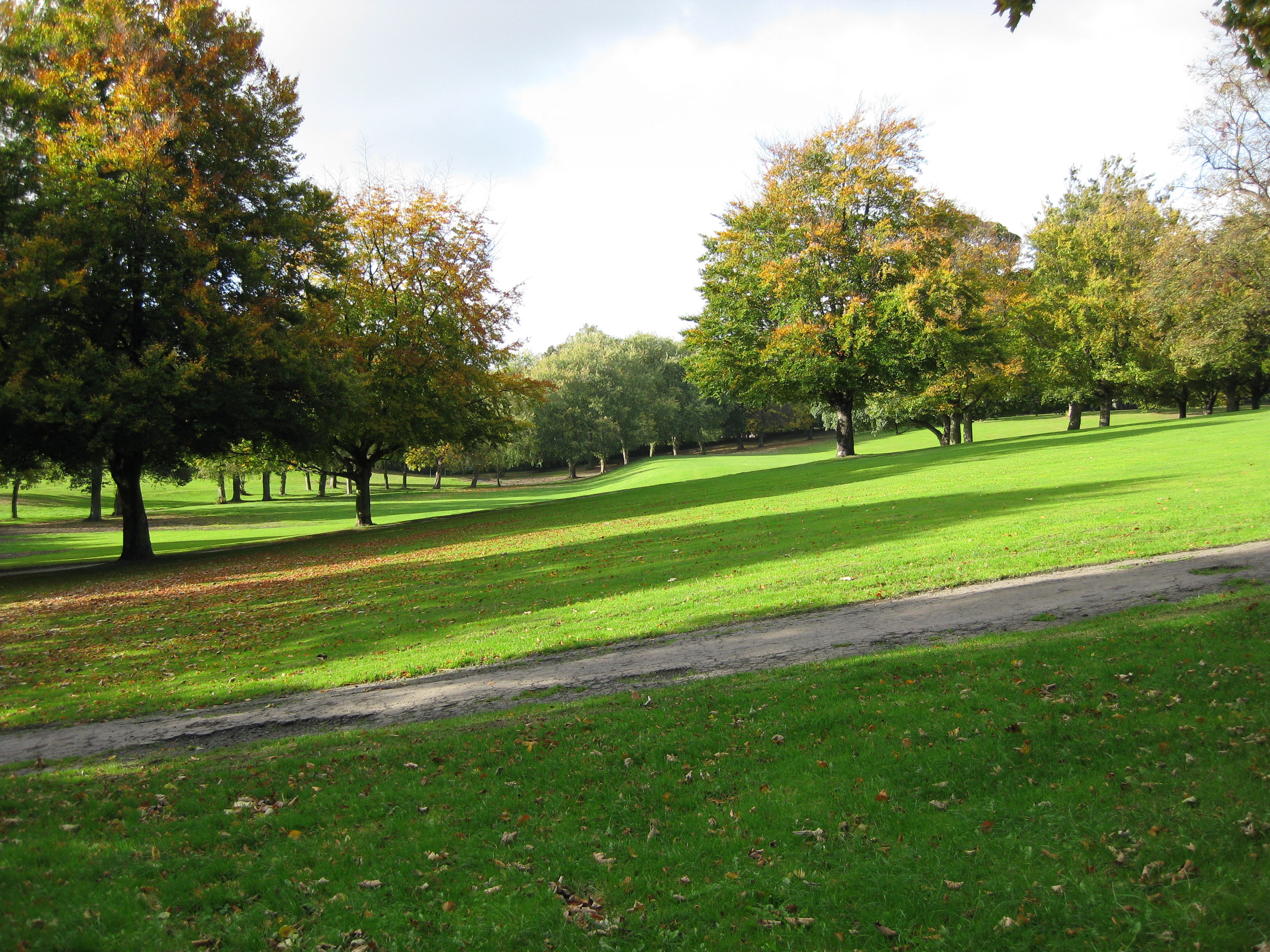
Potternewton Park

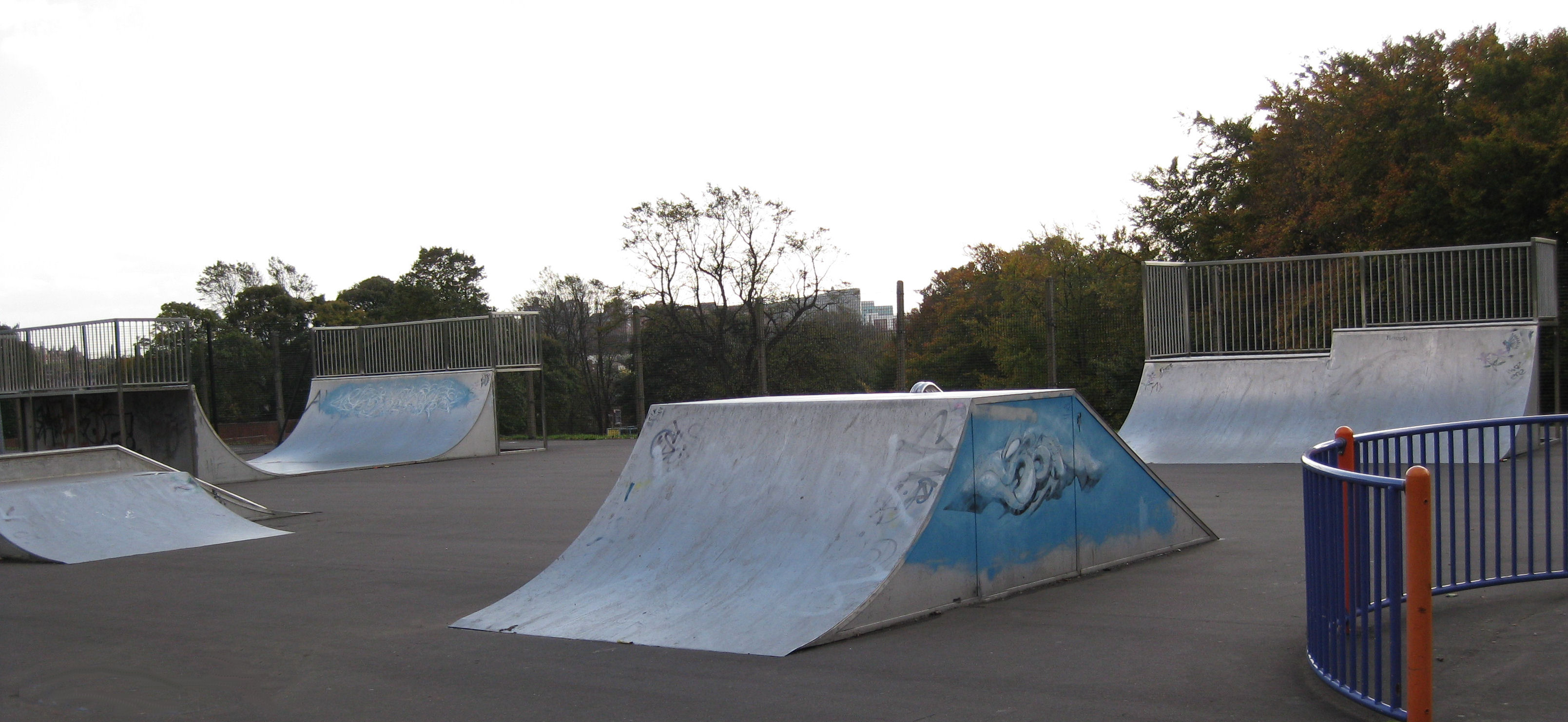
Skate park in Potternewton Park

Potternewton is bounded by Scott Hall Road to the west, Roundhay Road to the east and Harehills Lane to the north. The main thoroughfare is Chapeltown Road. The suburb is often considered to be part of Chapeltown. On older maps, Potternewton included the Chapeltown and Scott Hall areas and parts of Harehills. Potternewton is an historic village and many older maps prioritise its name over Chapeltown.

== Etymology ==
The name is attested in the twelfth century as Neuton and Neuthon. The name is from the Old English nīwe meaning new and tūn a farmstead or estate. The name appears with the addition of 'potter' in the thirteenth century, as Pottersneuton, Neuton Potter, Potterneuton and Potter Newton because a pottery industry had developed to distinguish it from many other villages called Newton in the country.

Potternewton once included Allerton Gledhow. The name Allerton comes from the Old English alor, an alder tree, in its genitive plural form alra, and the word tūn meaning 'farmstead of the alder trees'. The element Gledhow refers to the nearby settlement of the same name, distinguishing it from nearby places such as Chapel Allerton, Moor Allerton, and Allerton Bywater.

== History ==
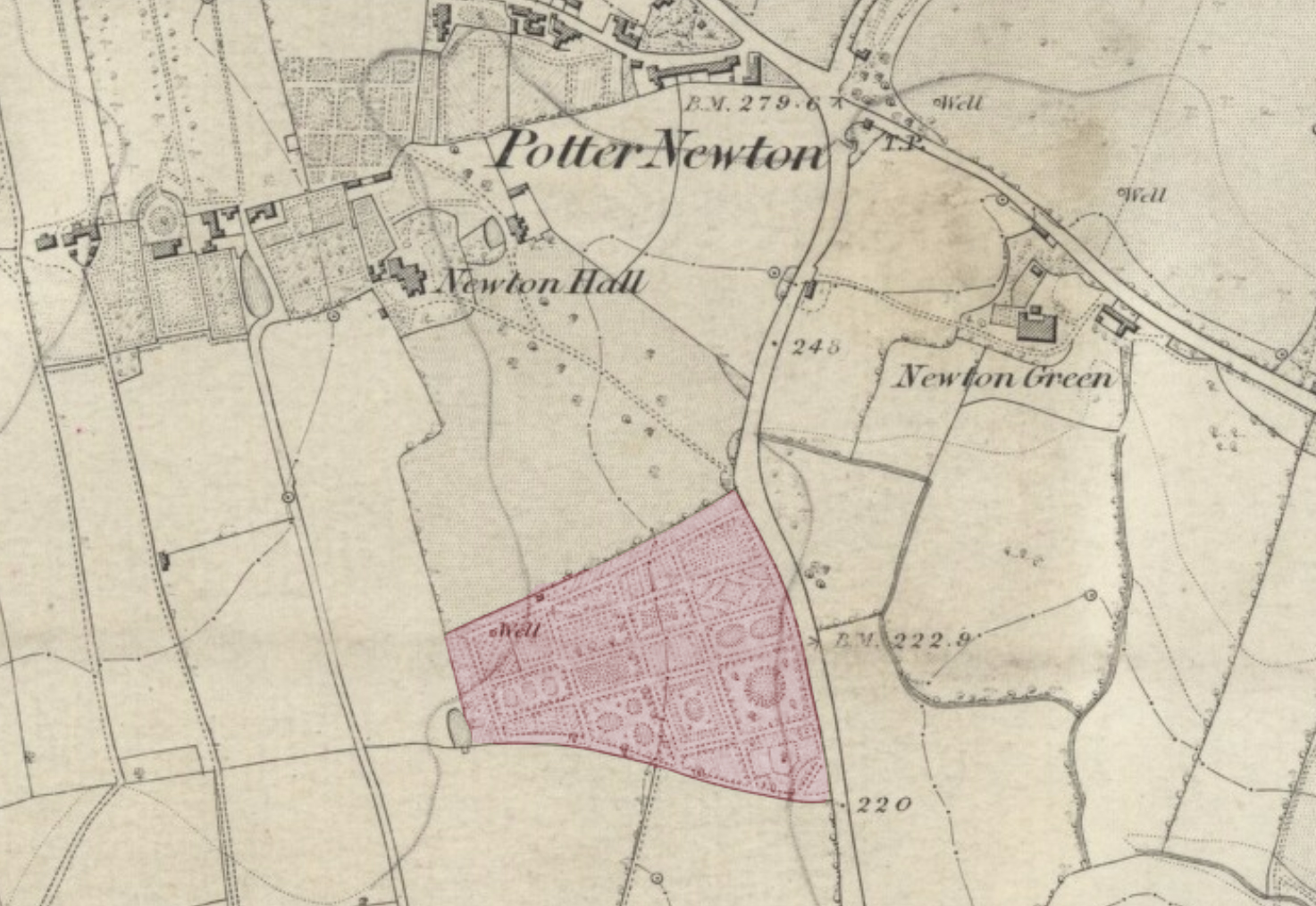
1842 map of Potternewton; Potternewton Hall, Newton Hall, Newton Green Hall, lodges, farms and out-buildings

Potternewton was the site of pottery manufacture in the Roman period. Over time the manor belonged to the Mauleverers, the Scotts of Scott Hall, the Hardwicks and in 1870 belonged to the Earl of Mexborough.

The Earl of Mexborough and Earl Cowper sold parts of their estates in the 1700s and litigated until the early 1800s as to who legally owned the land. Around this time James Brown owned much of the area that became known as Chapeltown.

In "the first year of the sixteenth century" the Low Hall or Newton Hall estate was worth 300 pounds a year. In the 18th century, the Barker-Ray family owned Newton Hall (Low Hall) which Ralph Thoresby described as a "venerable old fabric" and built Potternewton Hall, the "upper house", for the widow, Mrs Barker, to retire to in the 1730s.

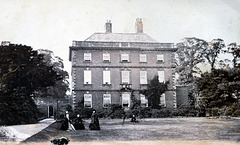
Potternewton Hall, built c. 1730

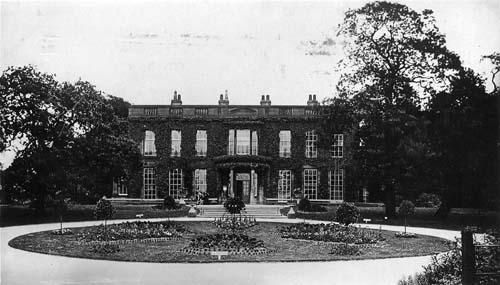
Built c. 1817. The mansion at Potternewton Park from a postcard postmarked October 1909.

By the early 19th century, a number of mansions, some with extensive grounds, had been built around the Potternewton and Chapeltown roads: The Scott family owned the mid-18th century Scott Hall. Woollen merchant James Brown owned Harehills Grove, which was built around 1817. The Jowitt family who owned the 750-acre estate in 1861, sold it and back-to-back terraced houses were built on it. The house and its 30-acre park were bought by Leeds Corporation to create Potternewton Park in 1900. The house had been renamed Potternewton Mansion by the time it opened to the public in 1906. After 1929 the house was used for educational purposes. The Leeds Carnival procession starts and finishes in Potternewton Park.

In 1837, Potternewton Hall was the residence of Darnton Lupton, Mayor of Leeds (1844–45). His brother, Francis, lived at Potternewton Hall from 1847 and had purchased the freehold of the estate by 1860. In 1870, Francis and Darnton Lupton purchased the Newton Hall estate from their brother Arthur. By this time, Potternewton Lodge, Newton Green Hall, Potternewton Hall and Newton Hall were owned by the Lupton family. Arthur Lupton had bought Newton Hall and 50 acres of land from the Earl of Mexborough in 1845 with surveyor Henry Teal dividing the rest of the earl's land into lots for sale.

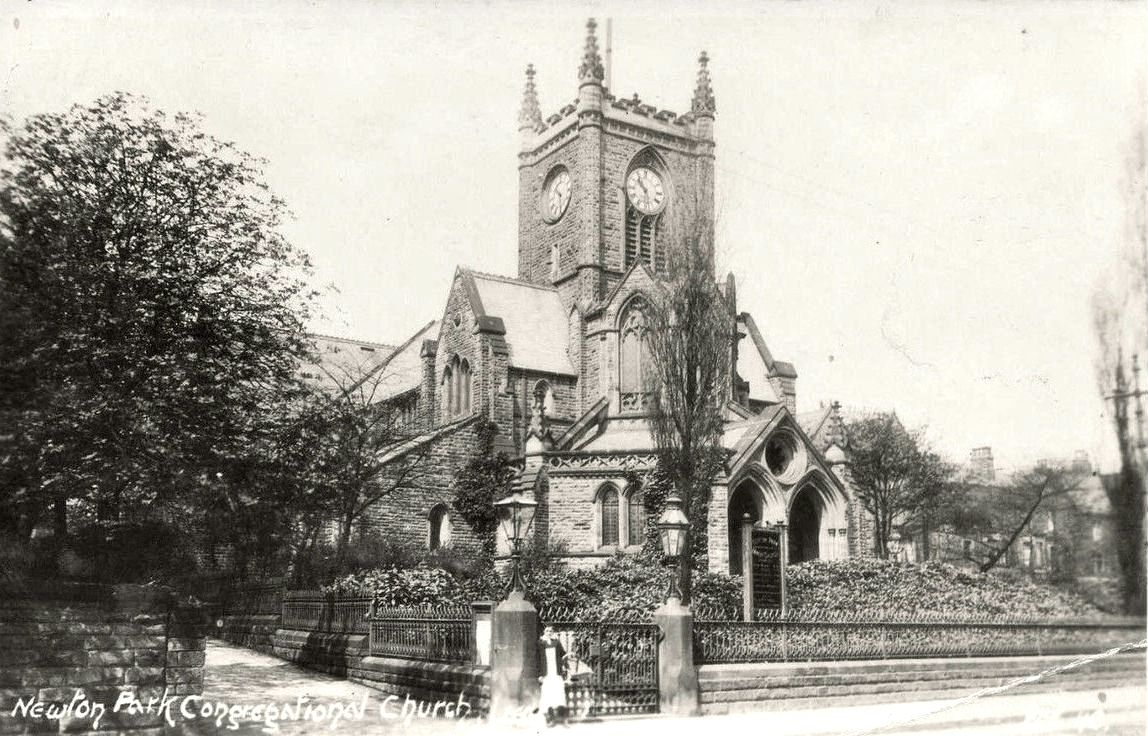
The foundation stone of Newton Park Union Church was laid by Sir John Barran in 1887.

In the 1870s, the Potternewton township, covering 1,667 acres about two miles north of Leeds, comprised the villages of New Leeds, part of Buslingthorpe and the hamlets of Gipton, Harehills, and Squire-Pastures.

By the outbreak of the Second World War, Newton Hall and Potternewton Hall had been demolished and the city's largest private housing estate was built on their surrounding land.

Francis Lupton's son, Francis Martineau Lupton inherited the estate where his daughter, Olive, grew up at Rockland, an Arts and Crafts stone-built house.

Newton-Potter was formerly a township in the parish of Leeds, in 1866 Potter Newton became a separate civil parish, on 26 March 1904 the parish was abolished and merged with Leeds. In 1901 the parish had a population of 26,004.

== Churches and chapels ==
Arthur Lupton supported building the old Potternewton Congregationalist Chapel and in 1870, a chapel designed by architect W. H. Harris, shared by Congregationalists and Baptists, was built on the Newton Hall Estate. By 1887, Newton Park Union Church, designed in the 14th century Decorated Gothic style by architect Archibald Neill, had been built at the east side of the chapel. By 1952, after deconsecration, the church was used as the Royal Air Force Association Club and became a Sikh temple in the 1960s. The 1870 chapel was used for a time as the Old Central Hebrew Congregational Synagogue.

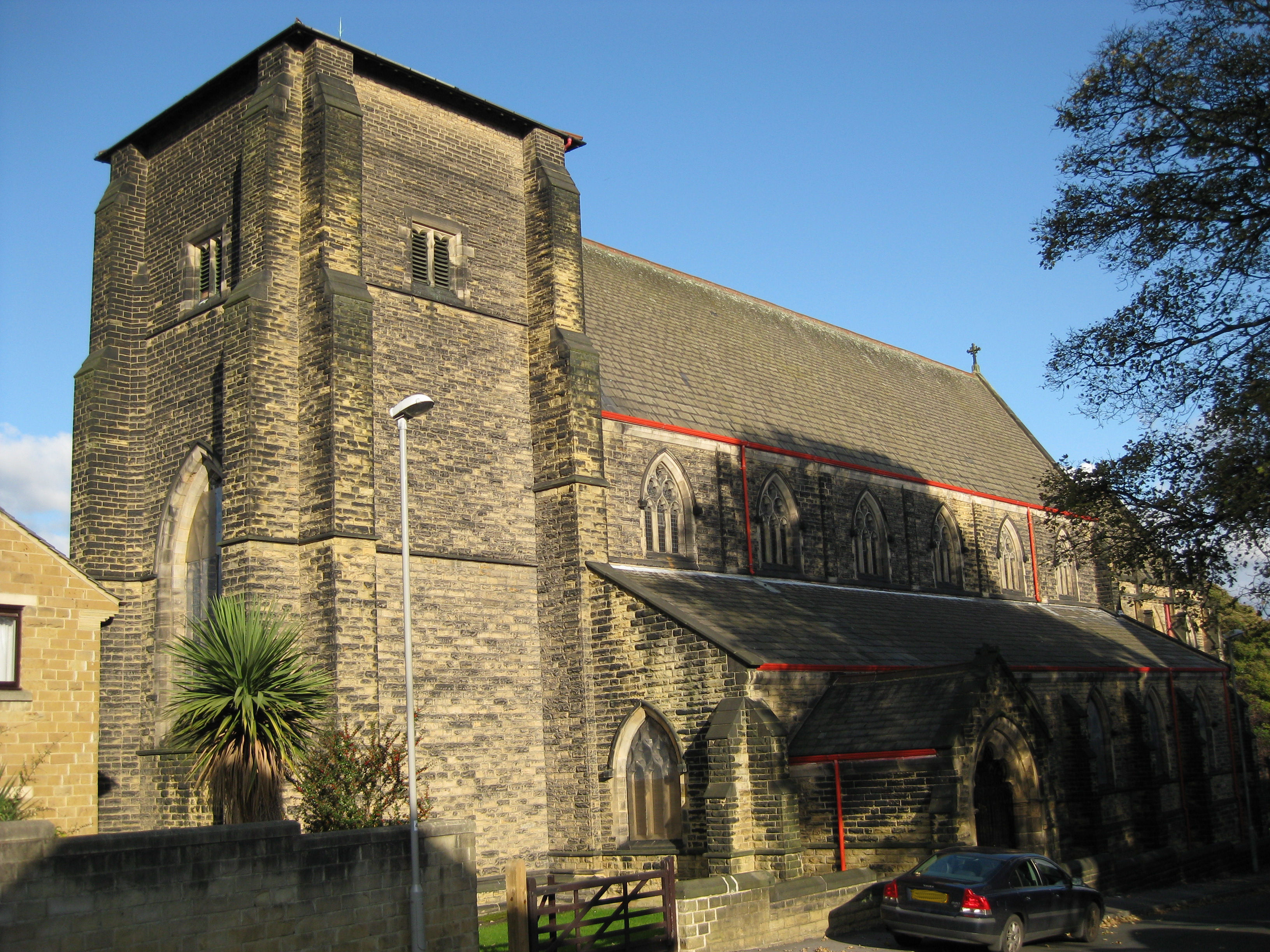
St Martin's Church (1879–81)

St Martin's Church, the Anglican parish church, off Chapeltown Road was built in 1879–1881 on land owned by the Lupton family. The site for St Martin's had been confirmed in June 1876. The church, designed by Adams & Kelly of Leeds, was consecrated in 1881. It was built of stone from local quarries. The stained glass was designed by Charles Eamer Kempe. The original design had a steeple, but lack of funds prevented its construction. It now has a mainly West Indian congregation.

Katherine Roubiliac Conder's diaries record her father, Eustace Conder, preaching at Newton Park Chapel in 1874. Herbert Gladstone, 1st Viscount Gladstone worshipped there in May 1880. In March 1880, Gladstonian liberalism was at its peak at Newton Park; Sir John Barran talked of himself and Herbert Gladstone, the Liberal M.P. for Leeds, as being "one man". The Leeds Mercury reported on 8 October 1887 that the ceremony of the laying of the foundation stone of the Newton Park Union Church "will be performed by Mr. J. Barran, M.P. (later Sir), on behalf of the Baptists, and by Mr. E. Crossley, M.P., on behalf of the Congregationalists”.

== 21st century ==
Transport Direct uses the names Potternewton and Chapeltown for separate areas. Potternewton is the small area around the north of Scott Hall Road around the Scott Hall Road/Potternewton Lane roundabout as most of the area is classified today as Chapeltown. West Yorkshire Metro and Transport Direct also identify the area as being in this location. Potternewton Lane is served by bus service 7.

Mill Field Primary Academy, formerly known as Potternewton Primary School, is on Potternewton Mount. The school converted to academy status on 1 December 2020.

== People of Potternewton ==
- Sir Charles Holroyd (1861–1917) Artist and museum curator
- Joyce Gould, Baroness Gould of Potternewton
- Lupton family
- Richard Hoggart

== See also ==
- Listed buildings in Leeds (Chapel Allerton Ward)
