= Miles Hill =

Area in Leeds

Coordinates: 53.827231°N 1.549597°W

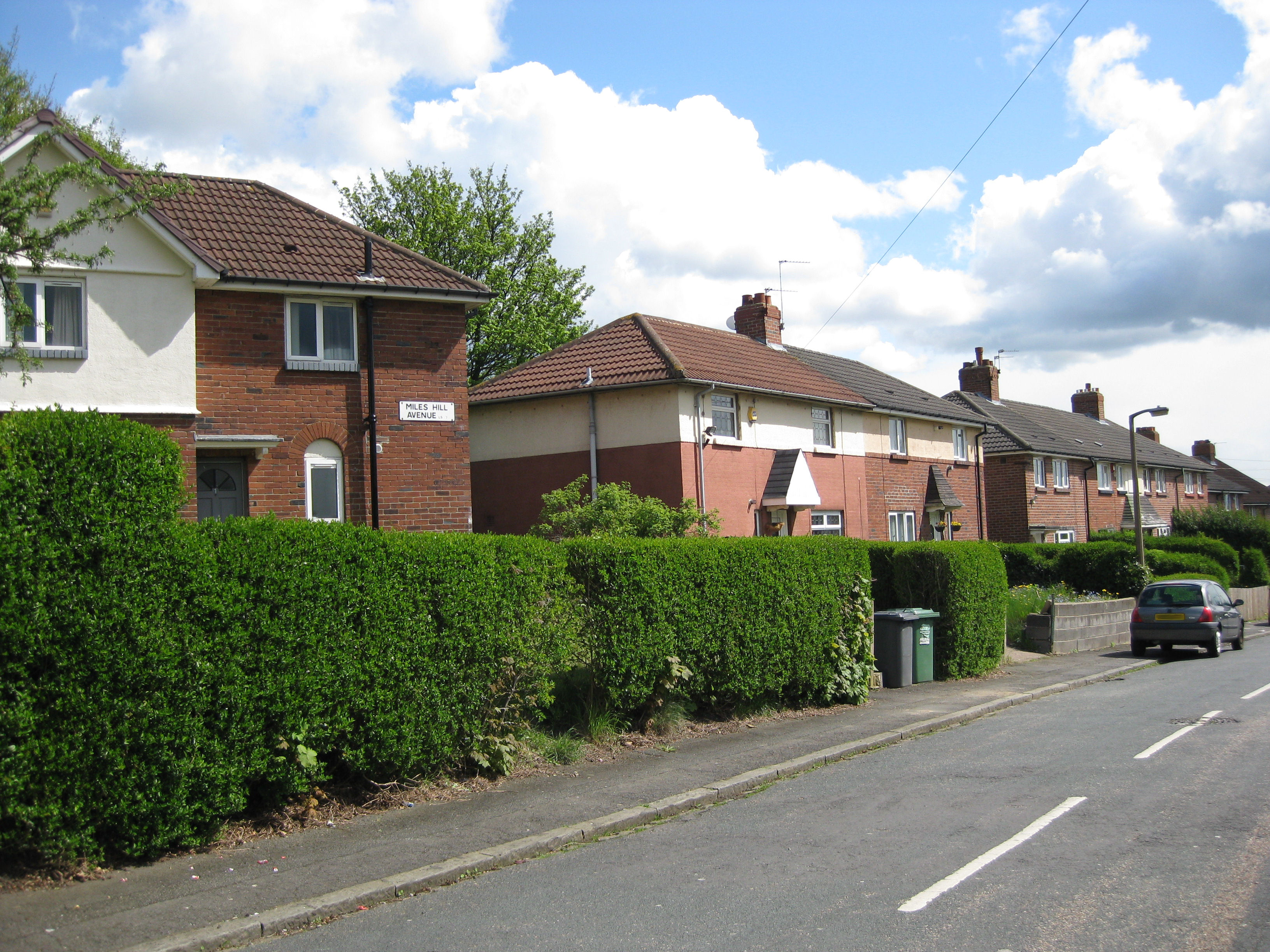
Miles Hill Avenue - semi-detached houses

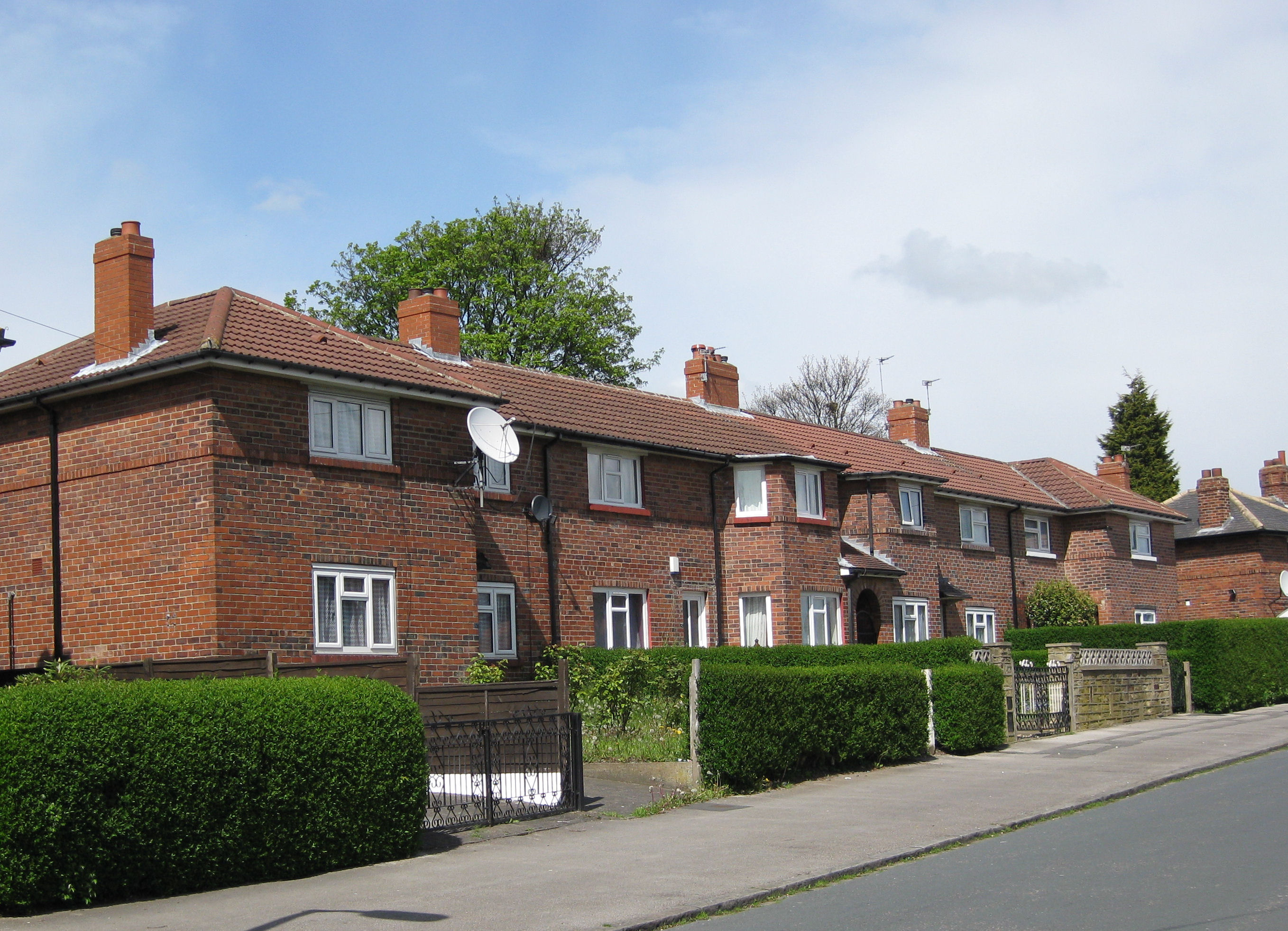
Miles Hill View - terraced houses

Miles Hill is a district in Leeds. It is about 1.5 miles (2 km) north of Leeds city centre, West Yorkshire, England and is situated between Meanwood and Chapel Allerton next to Beck Hill. The district is located in the Chapel Allerton ward of Leeds City Council.

As the name suggests, it is a hilltop, looking south over Leeds down the A61 Scott Hall Road. The main part is the Miles Hill estate of 1920s council houses, brick built semi-detached and terraces. A further estate, Beck Hill was built to the west in the 1970s, containing the (now closed and demolished in 2008) Miles Hill Primary School.

It is also home to Scott Hall Leisure Centre.
