= Beckhill =

Housing estate in Meanwood, Leeds, England

Coordinates: 53.8300°N 1.5554°W

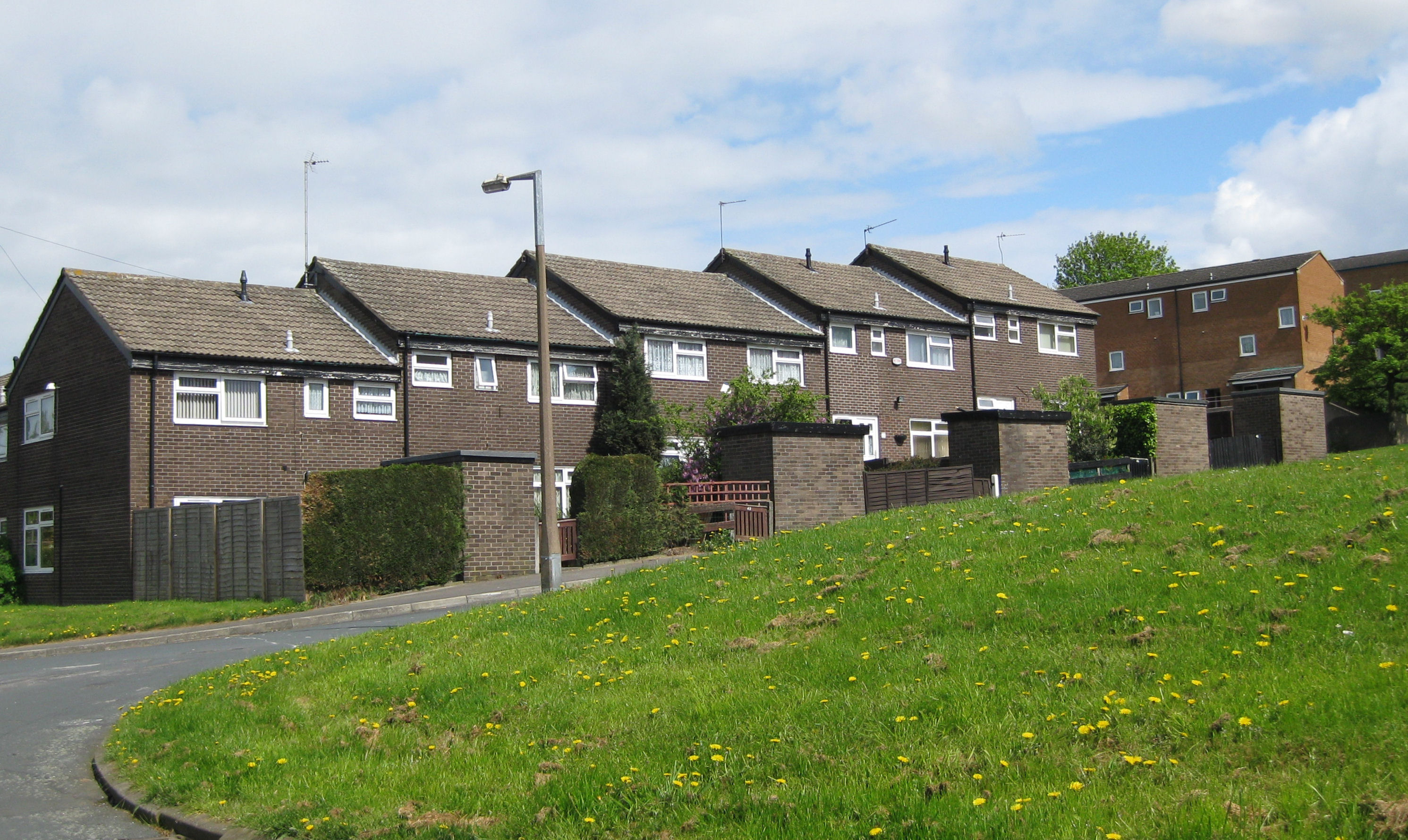
- Beckhill Approach, from Stainbeck Road

- Location within West Yorkshire
- Metropolitan borough: City of Leeds
- Metropolitan county: West Yorkshire
- Region: Yorkshire and the Humber
- Country: England
- Sovereign state: United Kingdom
- Post town: LEEDS
- Postcode district: LS7
- Dialling code: 0113
- Police: West Yorkshire
- Fire: West Yorkshire
- Ambulance: Yorkshire

Beckhill (or Beck Hill) is a small council estate in the Meanwood area of Leeds, West Yorkshire, England. It has received negative local publicity in the past, but is now the subject of urban regeneration. The area is situated south of Stainbeck Road and north of Potternewton Lane. To the east is the Miles Hill Estate. Beckhill falls within the Chapel Allerton ward of Leeds City Council.

== Location ==
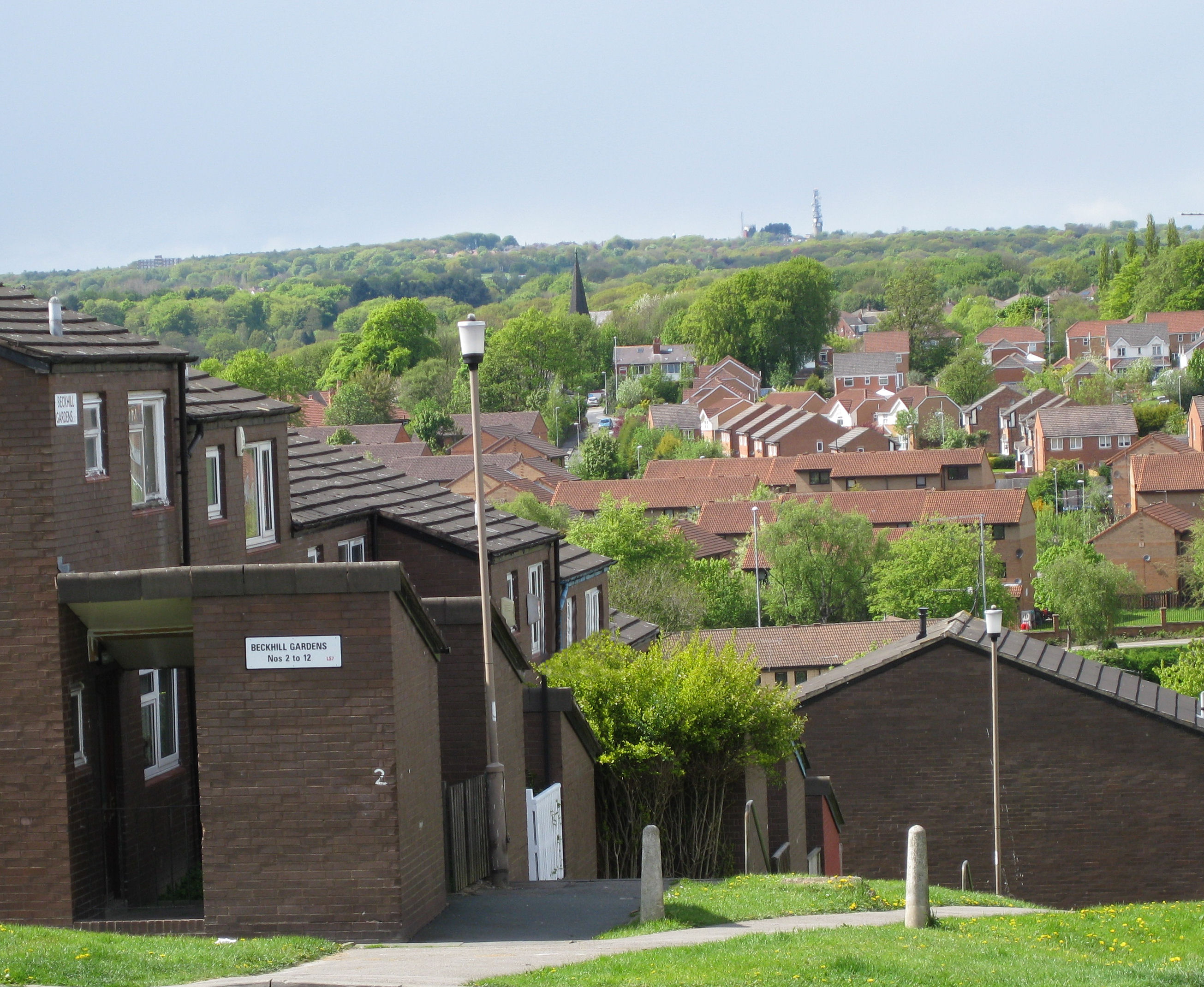
The view from Beckhill northwest

The area was built in the 1970s and consists mainly of brick built terrace houses. The estate had a small newsagents on Beckhill Approach which was demolished in 2014. There is only one entrance to the estate via car, from Stainbeck Road, however there are ginnels linking it with Potternewton Lane from Beckhill Gate.

== Schools ==
Miles Hill primary school was on Beckhill Approach, and had 170 pupils. The 2004 and 2007 league tables showed a challenging situation. The school was closed in 2007, and demolished in 2008. At the same time the estate children's play area in the former school grounds was closed due to maintenance costs. Beckhill is part of the intake area for St Urban's Catholic primary school. Miles Hill primary was recently replaced by the new Mill Field primary school on Potternewton Mount, which led to concerns over the road crossing in Potternewton Lane, as pupils now had to walk from their estates to the new school. However, this appears to be resolved by the addition of new zebra crossings.

== History ==
=== Past ===
In 2004 there was a problem with gang behaviour in this and other estates, and in 2006 it was reported that children were committing burglaries. There used to be a public house called the Hilltop in Beckhill Grove but it was demolished in 2007, making space for a planned local regeneration development by East North East Homes Leeds. In July 2007 authorisation was given to demolish a large number of properties on Beckhill Approach and Beckhill Garth, to make way for new family housing. Beckhill became the focus of negative press attention in December 2008, following the 'Beckhill Stabbing'. As of 2014, knife crime continued to be a problem on the estate.

=== Present and future ===
Since 2007, the Beckhill Implementation Group (BIG) received funding from the NHS for activities to promote health and wellbeing on the estate. BIG won an Effective Partnership Working Award on 18 March 2009. Groundwork Leeds is still involved in improvement of this environment. In 2007 the average value of a house on Beckhill Chase was approximately half that of the average house in Leeds, and at least one of those houses was built in 1968. In Beckhill Grove there are 39 homes, built about the same time.

There is an active Beckhill Tenants and Residents' Association. £10,000 funding was agreed by Leeds City Council (North East Inner Area Committee) in 2008 for a study into the feasibility of providing a new community centre for Beckhill. The Three Churches Project focuses on this and other nearby estates. In 2008 the group completed a four-month project with people from estates including Beckhill, and performed a play based on Shakespeare's The Two Gentlemen of Verona. New council housing is planned for the estate, as a second phase of Leeds City Council's intention to build 80 properties across three sites in Leeds.

Houses on the estate around Beckhill Approach were demolished in 2012 and the estate's newsagent was demolished in 2014.
