= Herbert Kneeshaw =

English footballer and coach

Personal information
- Full name: Herbert Justin Kneeshaw
- Date of birth: 1883
- Place of birth: Beckhill, England
- Date of death: 1955 (aged 71–72)
- Height: 5 ft 11 1/2 in (1.82 m)
- Position: Goalkeeper

Senior career*
Years	Team	Apps	(Gls)
- Heaton
1903–1904	Bradford City	0	(0)
- St Cuthbert's
- Guiseley
1907–1909	Bradford City	1	(0)
- Colne Town
1912–1924	Cardiff City	147	(0)
- * Club domestic league appearances and goals

Herbert Justin Kneeshaw (1883–1955) was an English professional footballer who played as a goalkeeper. He made over 100 appearances for Cardiff City during a 12-year spell at the side and later became a coach at the club.

== Career ==
Born in Beckhill, Kneeshaw has two spells for Bradford City (from 1903 to 1904, and from March 1907 to September 1909), and also played for Heaton, St Cuthbert's, Guiseley and Colne Town. During his time with Bradford City he made one appearance in the Football League. In 1912, Kneeshaw joined Southern Football League side Cardiff City after being spotted by manager Fred Stewart, making his debut for the club on the opening day of the 1912–13 season during a 1–1 draw against the club's South Wales rivals Swansea Town.

He quickly established himself as the first choice goalkeeper for the Bluebirds, playing in over 100 matches in the Southern Football League, a spell interrupted by the outbreak of World War I, and won the Second Division of the Southern Football League in his first season at Ninian Park. He remained with the club following their move into the Football League for the 1920–21 season, playing in their first ever Football League match during a 5–2 victory over Stockport County. However, midway through the season, he was displaced by Ben Davies and spent two seasons as backup, only appearing in a handful of matches for the club, before deciding to retire from the game following the arrival of Tom Farquharson. He instead took up a coaching position with the club and remained in the role for over a decade.

== Honours ==
Cardiff City

- Southern Football League Second Division winner: 1912–13

== Sources ==
- Frost, Terry (1988). Bradford City A Complete Record 1903–1988. Breedon Books Sport. ISBN 0-907969-38-0.
