= Cowper Street School strike =

Youth strike in Leeds (UK)

- Date: 25 June 1973
- Location: Cowper Street School, Chapeltown, Leeds, England
- Cause: Racism
- Filmed by: Chapeltown Parents Action Group
- Participants: Middle School pupils and their parents
- Outcome: Improvements to children's education

The Cowper Street School strike was an event on 25 June 1973 where Caribbean parents in Chapeltown, a district in Leeds in the United Kingdom, withheld their children from attendance at Cowper Street School (known as Hillcrest Academy in 2026). Organised by the Chapeltown Parents Action Group (CPAG), the strike itself showed the dedication that black parents in Chapeltown had to the education of their children and the work of CPAG was influential on later actions and organisations. The strike action was described by historian Olivia Wyatt as "unprecedented in Leeds".

== Background ==
Cowper Street School (2015)

Chapeltown is a multi-ethnic area, part of the city of Leeds. Many people from Caribbean backgrounds, especially those who emigrated from St Kitts and Nevis, settled in the area from the 1950s onwards alongside Irish, South Asian, Polish and other communities. The area hosted many political organisations connected to Caribbean communities, these included the United Caribbean Association (UCA), the African, Caribbean and Asian Organisation (ACAO), the West Indian Afro Brotherhood (WIAB), amongst others, some of which were also inspired by the black power movement. Members of some of these groups also founded or were members of the Chapeltown Parents Action Group (CPAG), which was founded in 1973 and instrumental in campaigning for better education for young people in the area. CPAG was chaired by Odessa Stoute, and its secretary was Fayola Hendrickson, although the organisation had first been convened by Calvin Beech and Arthur France (the latter both involved with the UCA).

Prior to the strike, parents of children attending the Cowper Street School (Hillcrest Academy) had already approached Leeds City Council's Education Department with a range of requests. These included increasing the number of black governors on the school board, making positive changes to the relationship between the school and the community, improvements to facilities, and the dismissal of the headteacher. These however were not agreed to by the council.

== Strike action ==
Organised by the Chapeltown Parents Action Group, pupils removed from classes were attendees of the Middle School. Children spent the day in a local church, whilst parents picketed the school itself. Parents were concerned about the quality of the education their children were receiving, lack of facilities and racist remarks made the headteacher William Buckle. The only black teacher at the school in 1973 was Gertrude Paul, who later became Leeds' first black headteacher; she called in sick on the day of the strike so did not cross the picket line. Paul had previously complained that the headteacher made racist remarks about the pupils.

The impact of the strike was felt deeply in Leeds. A public meeting was held two days after the strike which had over 100 parents in attendance. At the meeting Leeds Deputy Chief Education Officer R. S. Johnson announced that the school would receive new equipment, more teaching posts at a senior level would be established and expert teachers would also be employed there. The changes in teaching were designed to reduce the high turnover of teaching staff. Many of these actions were similar to the earlier requests made by parents. William Buckle resigned on 31 December 1973 and was immediately replaced by Brian Clarke.

== Legacy ==
Described by historian Olivia Wyatt as "unprecedented in Leeds", the strike itself showed the dedication that black parents in Chapeltown had to the education of their children. However, some white parents and some members of Leeds City Council believed that the actions of black, working-class parents to raise the aspirations of their children were unrealistic.

School strikes became a technique used elsewhere: at Eccleshill Upper School in Bradford in 1984, Asian parents and pupils organised a strike protesting against racist abuse and alleged assaults by staff on Asian students. Wyatt also suggests that the work of Chapeltown Parents Action Group was influential on the foundation of the Black Parents’ Movement in London.
