= Gertrude Paul =

British-West Indian teacher (1934–1992)

Gertrude Maretta Paul
- Born: 6 September 1934; Saint Kitts, British West Indies
- Died: 7 January 1992 (aged 57); Saint Kitts, Saint Kitts and Nevis
- Education: James Graham College of Education
- Occupations: Educator, advocate

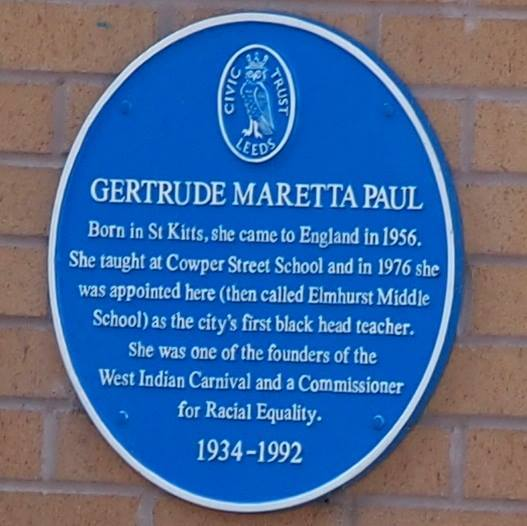
Gertrude Paul Blue Plaque

Gertrude Maretta Paul (6 September 1934 – 7 January 1992) was a teacher and advocate for the British Caribbean community in Yorkshire.

== Biography ==
Paul was born on 6 September 1934 in Parson's Ground Village on the Caribbean island Saint Kitt's, one of eleven children. She moved to Leeds, England in 1956. Despite having been awarded a teaching training qualification in Antigua, when she arrived in England she was required to complete a British training course, which she did at the James Graham College of Education (now part of Leeds Beckett University) and graduated in the early 1960s.

Paul was the first black teacher in Leeds. She taught at Cowper Street School in Chapeltown, during the Cowper Street School strike; Paul called in sick the day of the strike so she did not have to cross the picket line. In 1976 she became the first black headteacher in the city, running Elmhurst Middle School (later known as Bracken Edge Primary School). A community builder, she was one of the founders of the Leeds West Indian Carnival, which is one of the longest running West Indian carnivals in Europe and the longest running in the UK. She was a co-founder and president of the United Caribbean Association in Leeds, and also served on the UK government's Commission for Racial Equality.

She died on 7 January 1992, of a heart attack, in Saint Kitts.

== Legacy ==
A blue plaque commemorates her at the school she worked at, Elmhurst Middle School, now Bracken Edge Primary, unveiled in 2011 by Leeds Civic Trust. Paul was nominated for the plaque by members of Chapeltown Heritage Trust.

In May 2020 Leeds Beckett University launched the Gertrude Paul Doctoral Studentship, which will enable research into how numeracy and literacy can be improved for primary school children from African and Caribbean backgrounds.

Paul's name is one of those featured on the sculpture Ribbons, unveiled in 2024.
