= Arthur France =

Community organizer

Arthur France MBE
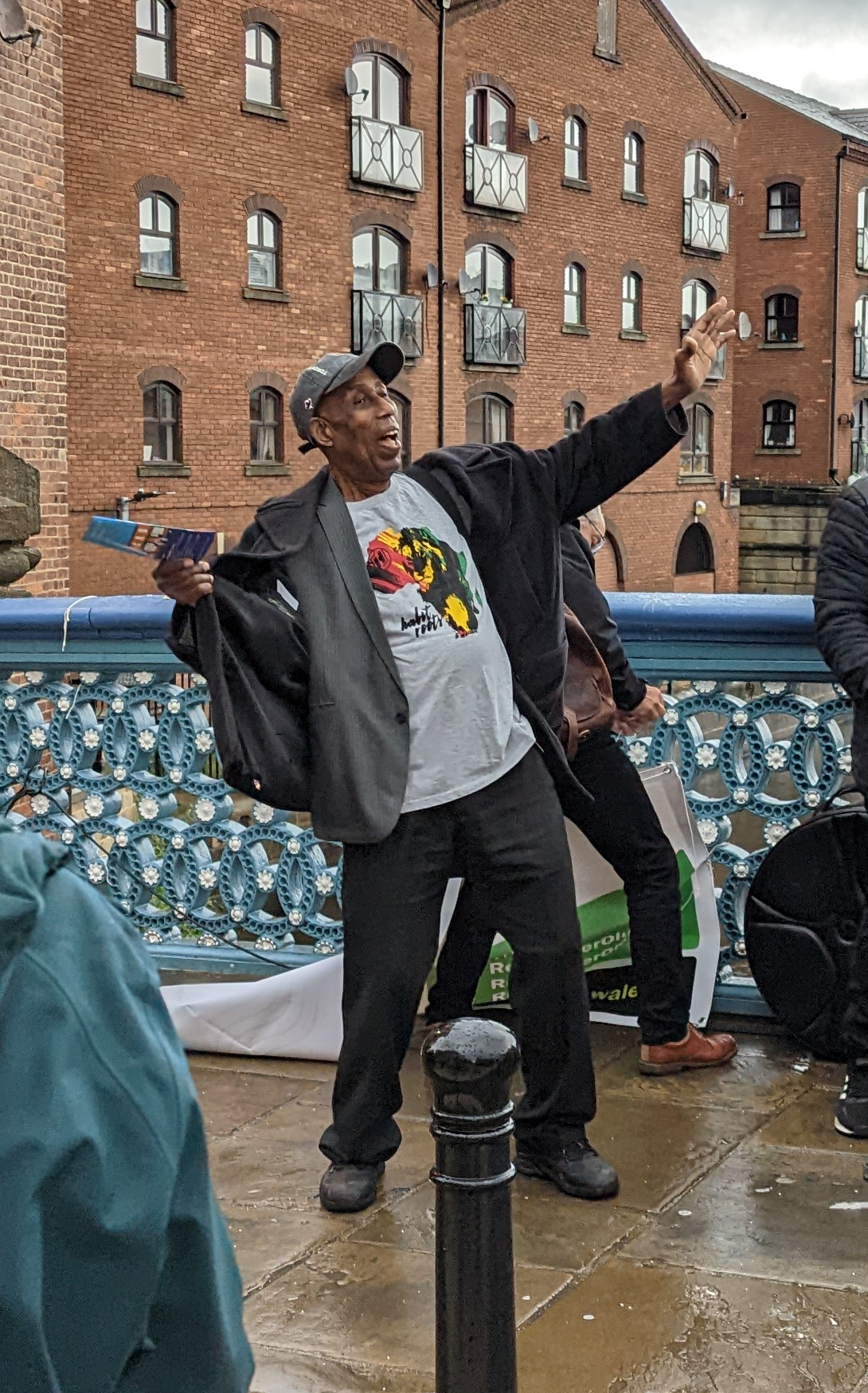
- Born: September 1935 (age 91); Mt Lily, Nevis, British Leeward Islands
- Occupations: Founder, Leeds West Indian Carnival
- Awards: Member of the Order of the British Empire; Hon LLD, University of Leeds; Hon D Arts, Leeds Beckett University

Thomas Arthur Benjamin France MBE (born September 1935) is a British community organiser who founded the first West Indian carnival in Europe, in Leeds in 1967.

== Early life ==
France was born in Mount Lily village, Nevis, in September 1935. He is the son of Ebenezer France, and a nephew of Saint Kitts and Nevis politician and later national hero, Joseph Nathaniel France. France grew up on Nevis, and in 1957 moved to Leeds in England.

== Career and carnival ==
After arriving in Leeds, France worked as a porter with British Railways from 1957 to 1960. He later worked for the Simpson and Cook building company, Leeds, and began to study at Leeds College of Technology. In 1964, he co-founded the United Caribbean Association. He was influential in the founding of the Chapeltown Parents Action Group (CPAG), which organised the Cowper Street School strike on 25 June 1973.

In August 1967, France established the Leeds West Indian Carnival; this was the first West Indian carnival in Europe. France continued to run the carnival committee for many years, and in 2017 the carnival marked its fiftieth anniversary. It remains the largest carnival outside London.

== Recognition ==
France has been widely recognized for his contributions to society and culture, both in the UK and in Nevis. He was awarded an MBE in June 1997 for 'services to the Afro-Caribbean community in Leeds'. He was awarded an honorary doctor of laws degree from the University of Leeds in 2015, and an honorary doctor of arts degree from Leeds Beckett University in 2018.

France's contributions were celebrated by the Nevis Island Administration in 2017, on the 50th anniversary of the Leeds Carnival. His portrait was commissioned and displayed in Harewood House as part of Harewood's 'open history' series, in 2022. His was the first portrait in a series titled 'Missing Portraits', which featured people of African-Caribbean heritage with connections to Harewood. France was honoured with a reception at the House of Commons in 2023.

In 2022, sociologist Max Farrar wrote an authorised biography of France, Speaking truth to power: The Life and Times of an African Caribbean British Man.
