= Scott Hall, Leeds =

Suburb of Leeds, England

Coordinates: 53.821°N 1.541°W

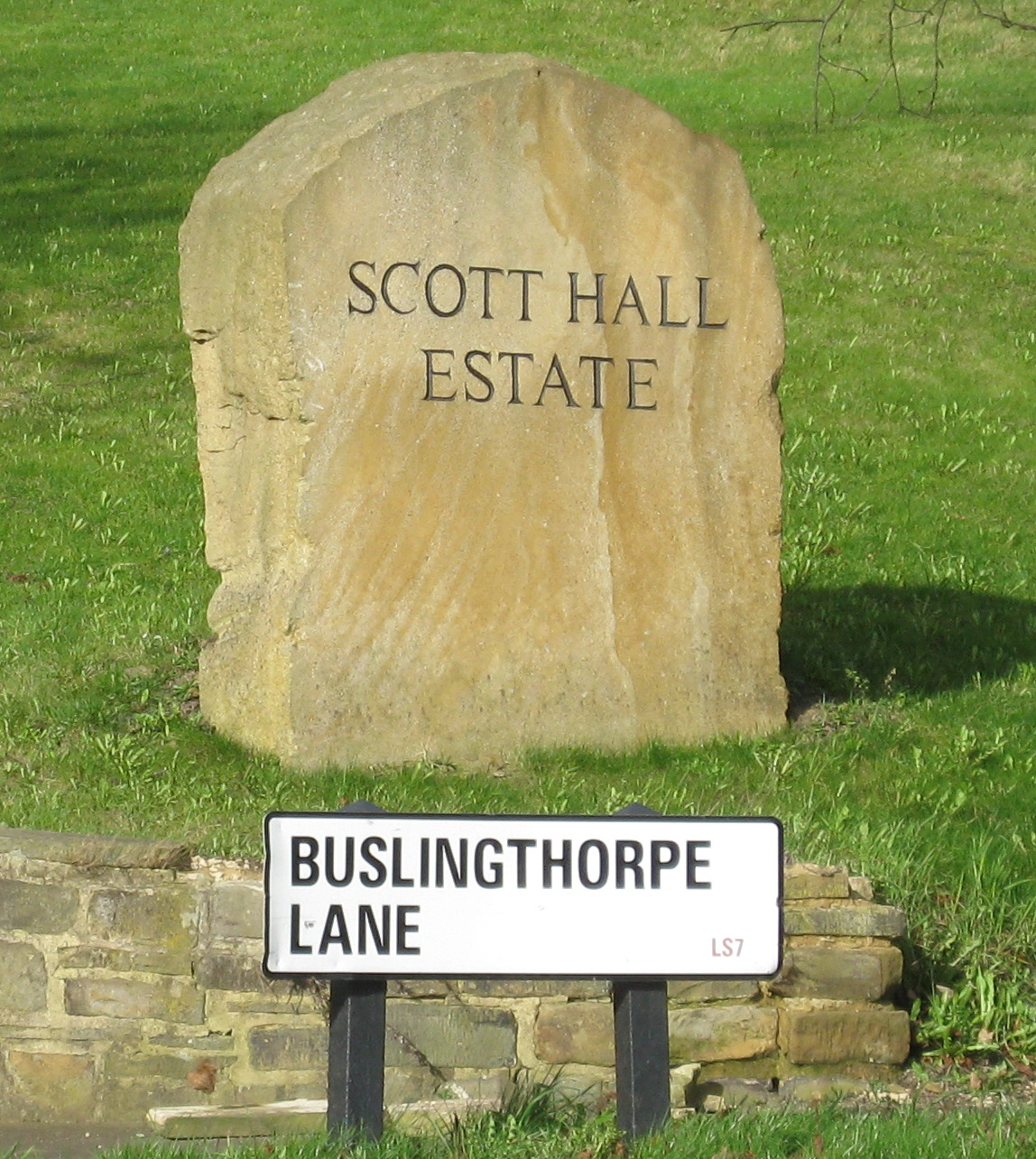
The start of the estate at the bottom of Scott Hall Road

Scott Hall is a suburb of north-east Leeds, West Yorkshire, England, adjacent to Chapeltown and Meanwood. The suburb falls within the Chapel Allerton and Moortown wards of Leeds City Council. The Scott Hall estate is made up largely of 1930s council housing on both sides of Scott Hall Road (and streets beyond) from Buslingthorpe Lane in the south to Potternewton Lane in the north.

== Location and facilities ==
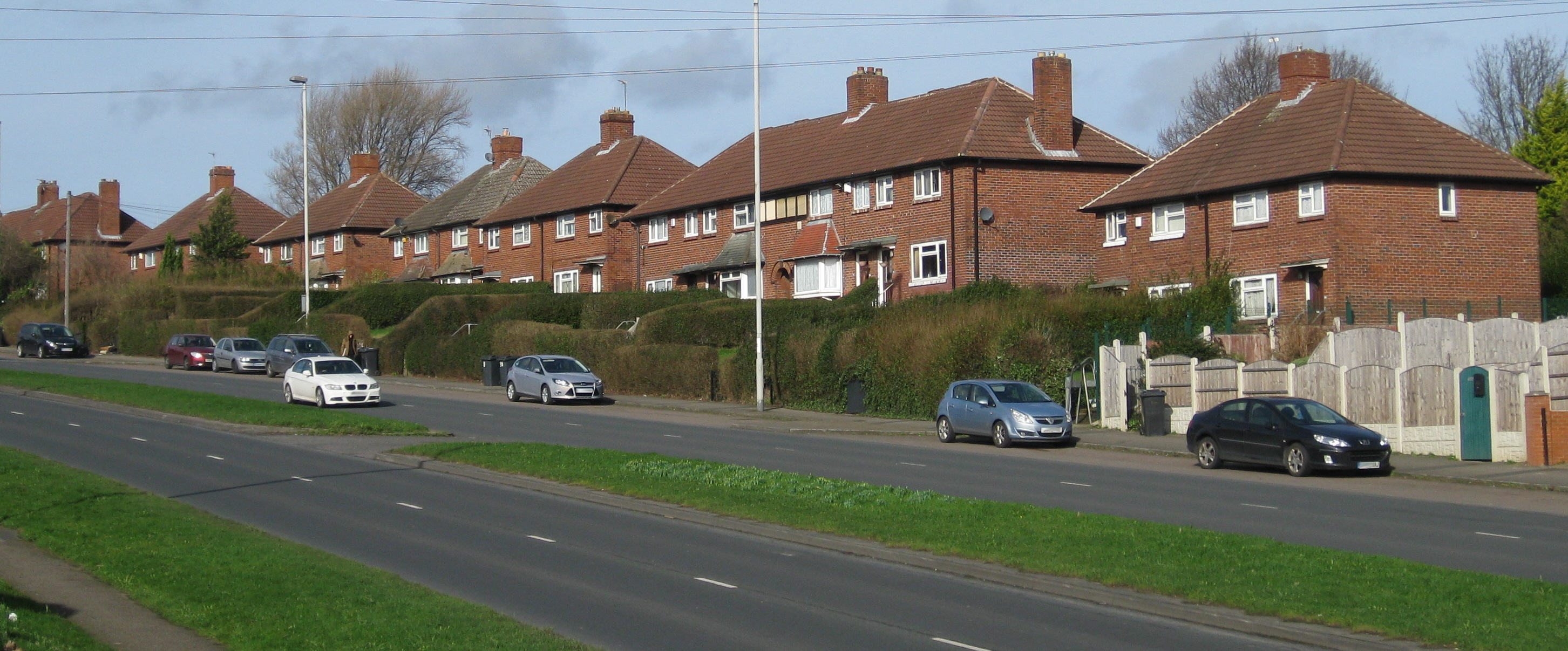
Scott Hall Road

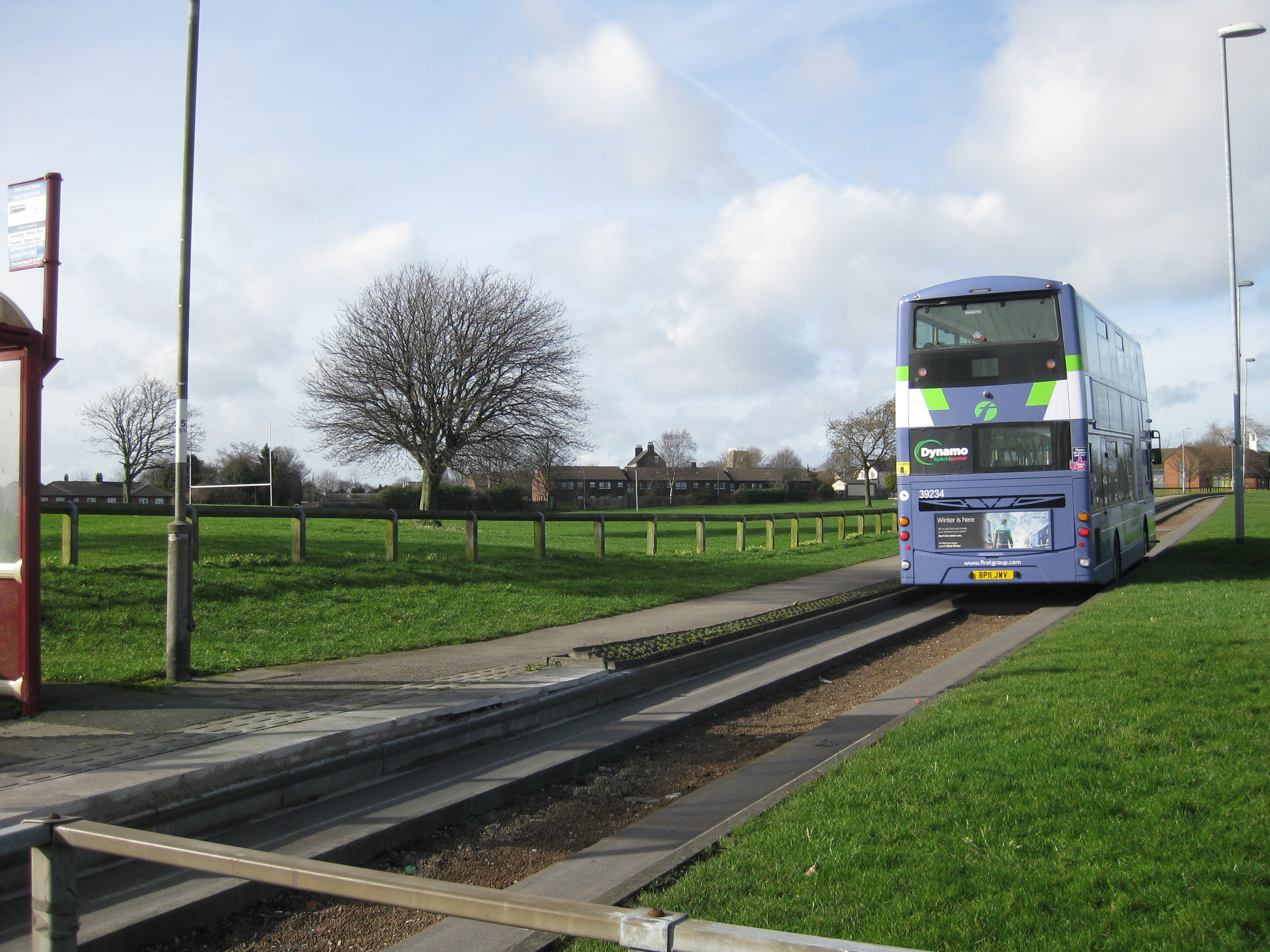
Bus to Shadwell on the Guided Bus Lane by Prince Philip Playing Fields

The A61 road between Leeds and Harrogate is the main thoroughfare known as Scott Hall Road, served by First buses 7/7A/7S. On this road, just north of Potternewton Lane in Miles Hill there are shops and the Scott Hall Leisure (sports) Centre which was refurbished at a cost of £500,000 in 2009. Scott Hall Church, formerly Scott Hall Christian Fellowship and Hope Hall, is an Evangelical fellowship. There is a guided bus route along Scott Hall Road, which has given rise to some controversy. Scott Hall Oval is used by the Caribbean Cricket Club. Part of the Leeds Half Marathon course goes through Scott Hall Road.

== History ==
The sports field at the junction between Scott Hall Road and Potternewton Lane used to be part of Scott Hall Farm. The farmhouse itself, on Scott Hall Street, is a Grade II listed building but was on the Heritage at Risk list, being described as "vulnerable through neglect and decay" in 2009. Bronte House (now flats) is a large building originally for single women, built in the 1930s at the junction of Buslingthorpe Lane and Scott Hall Drive. The PHAB club, which assists disabled people to enjoy life alongside able-bodied friends, started at the Prince Philip Centre in Scott Hall Avenue in 1970.

Two of the Yorkshire Ripper's victims lived just a few doors from each other in Scott Hall Avenue. They were his first victim, Wilma McCann, and his fifth, Jayne MacDonald.

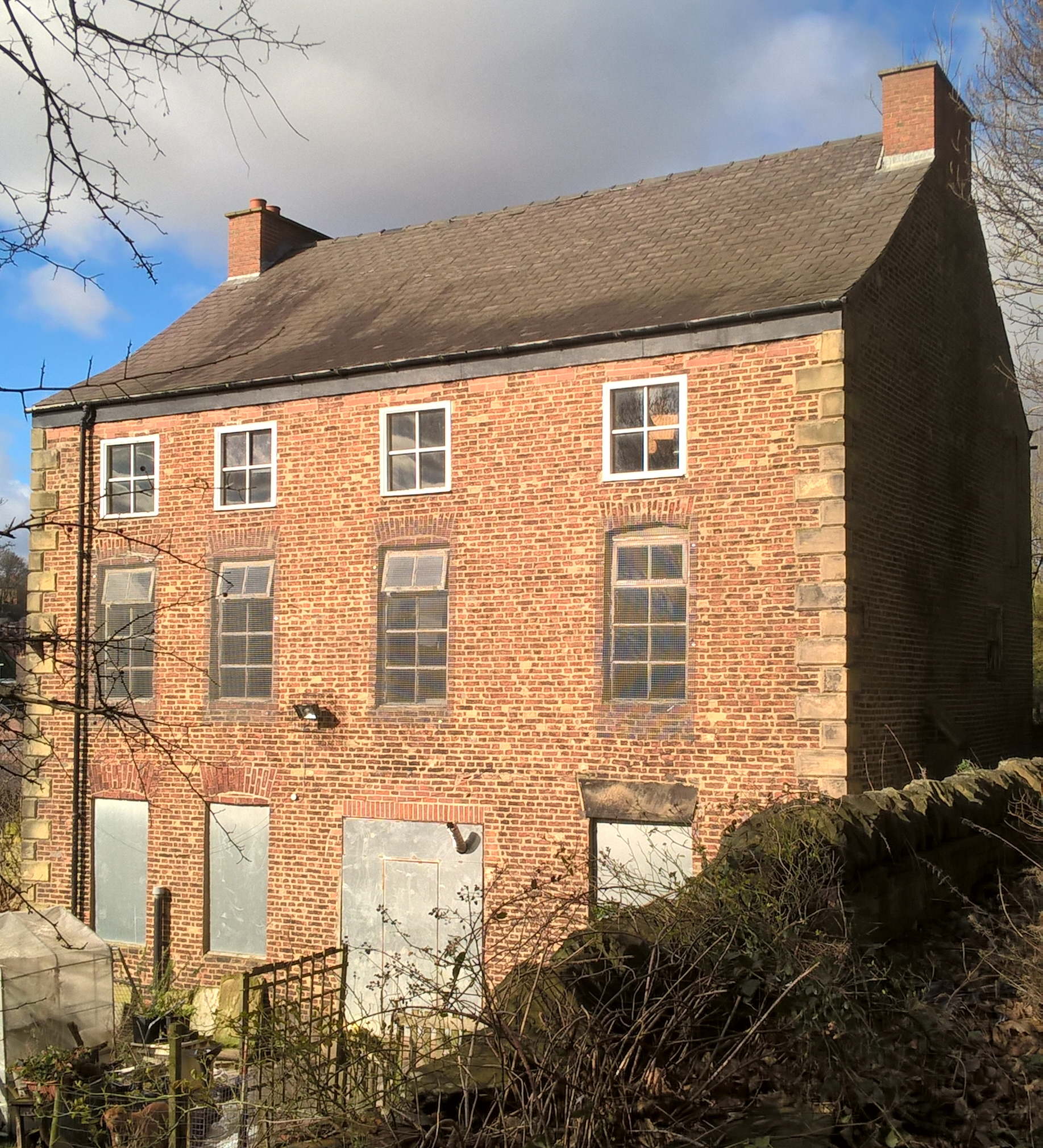
Scott Hall

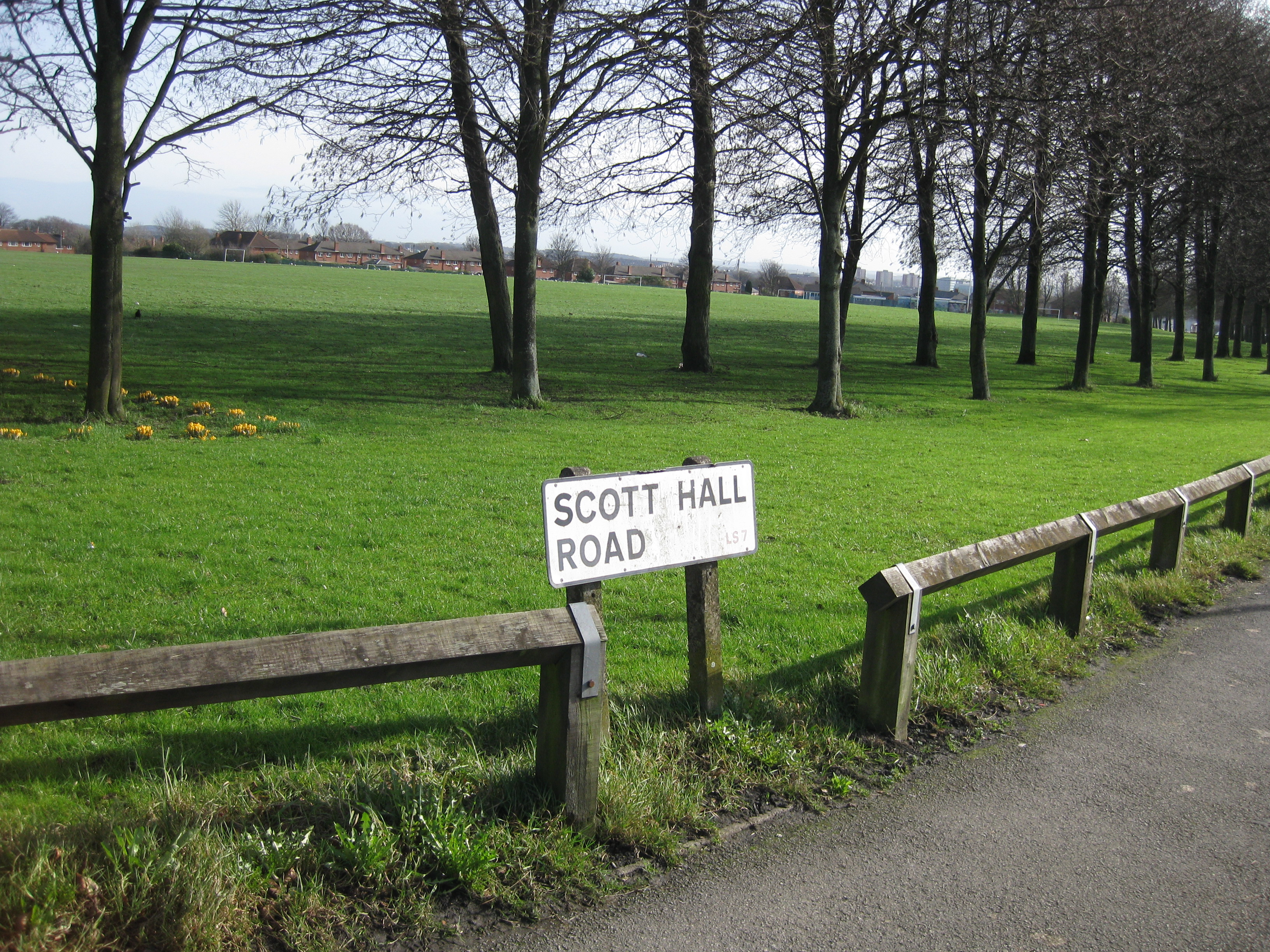
Playing fields on the former Scott Hall Farm site

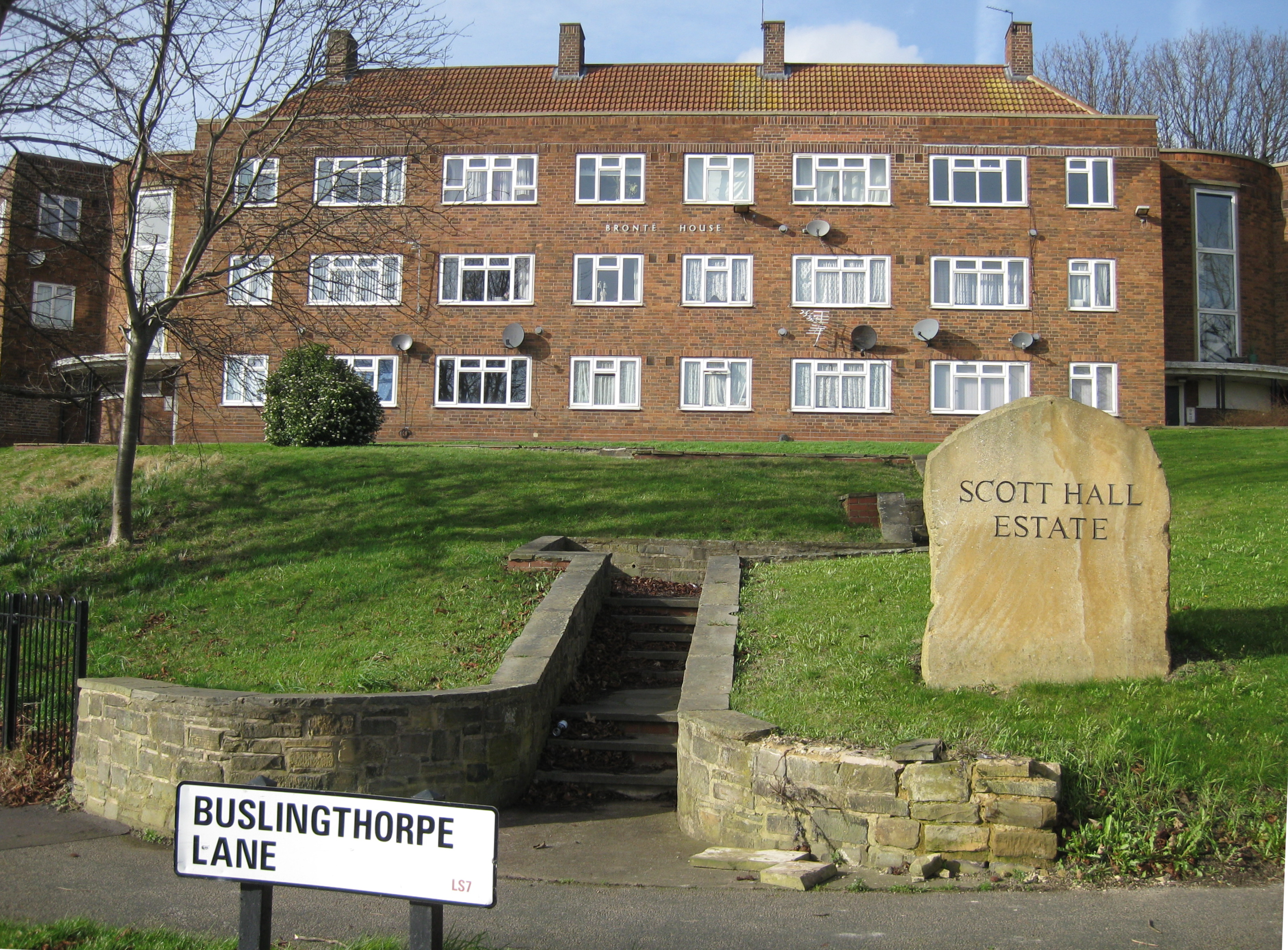
Bronte House

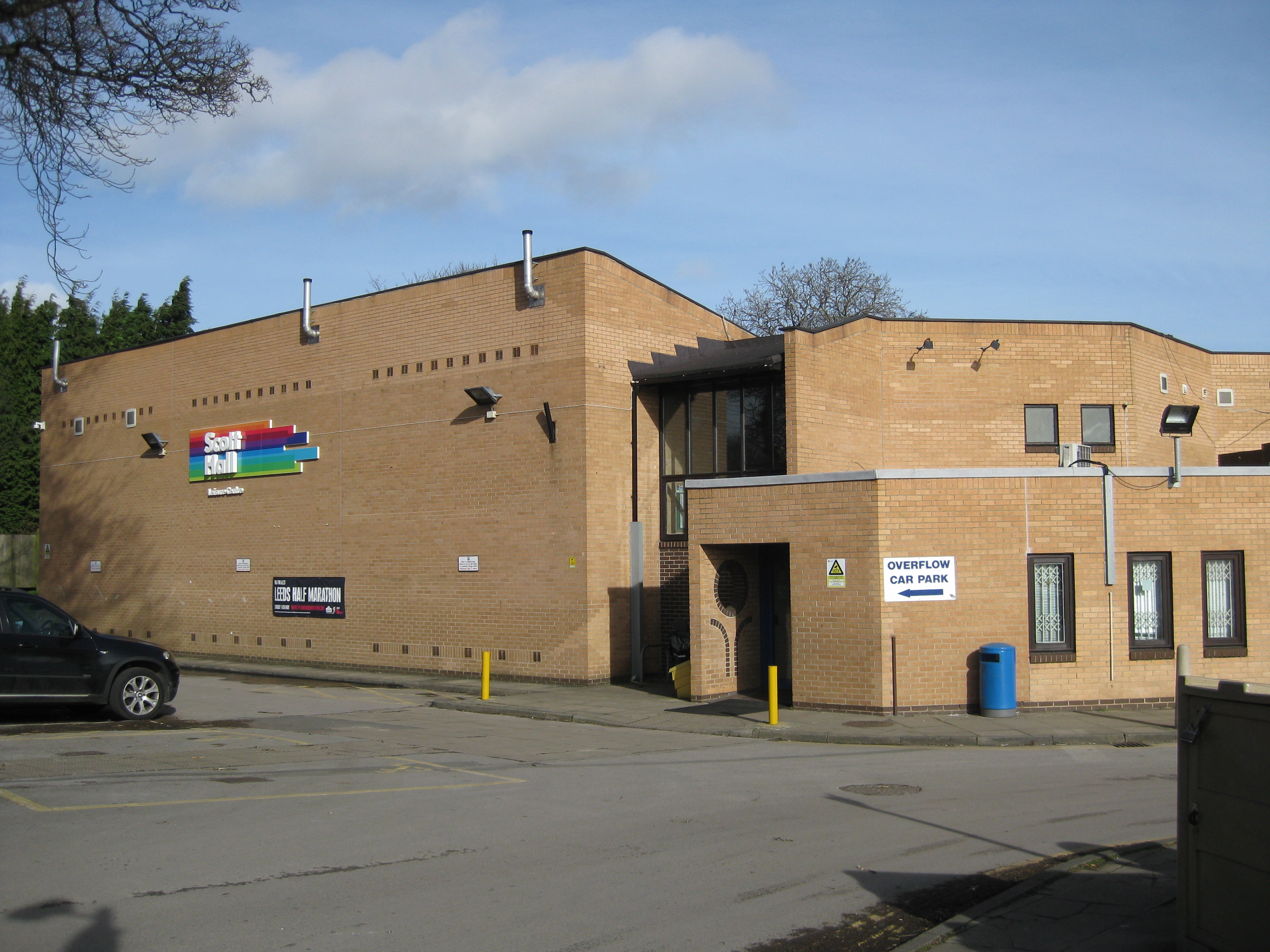
Scott Hall Leisure Centre

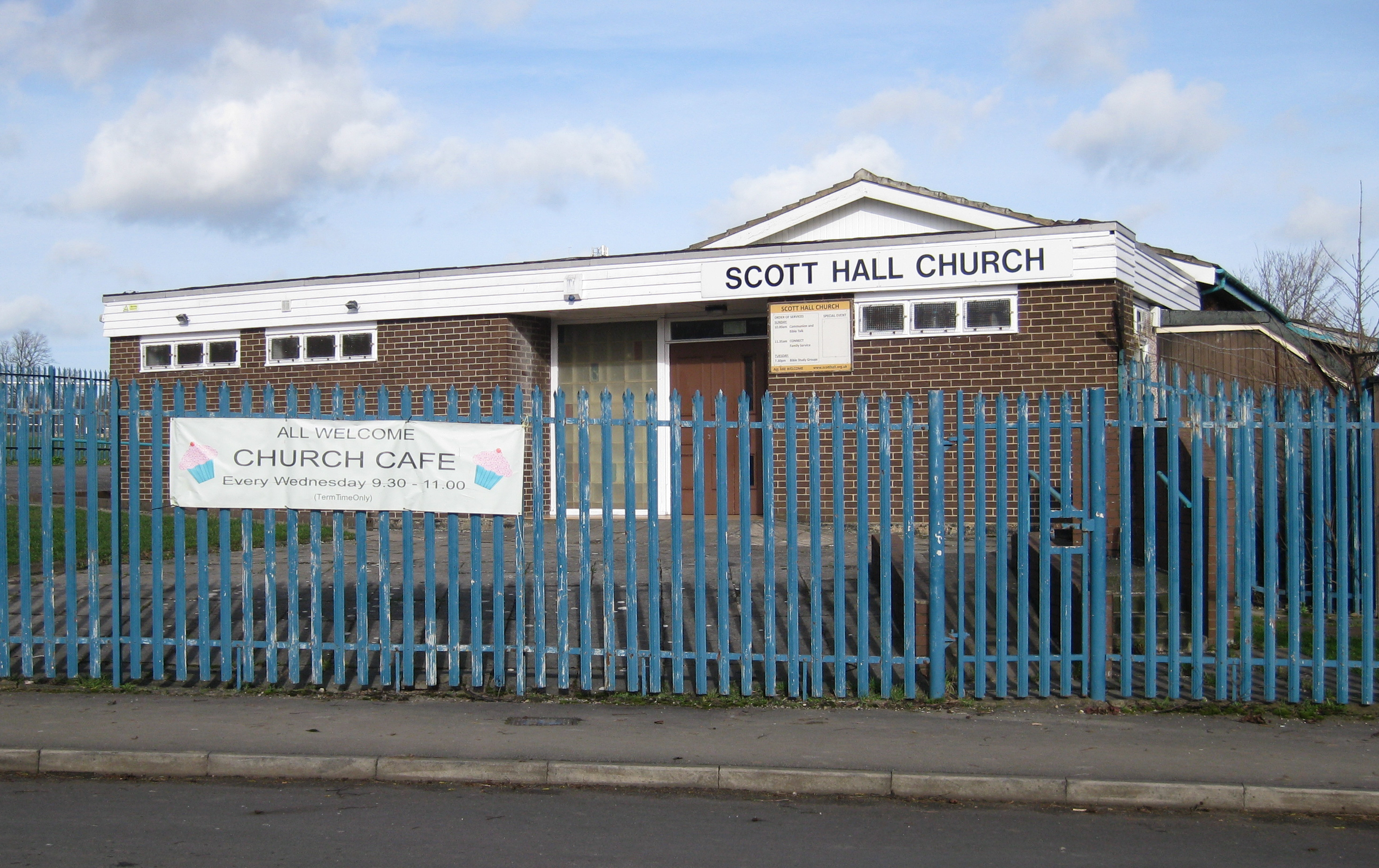
Scott Hall Church
