= Potternewton Park =

Park in Leeds, England

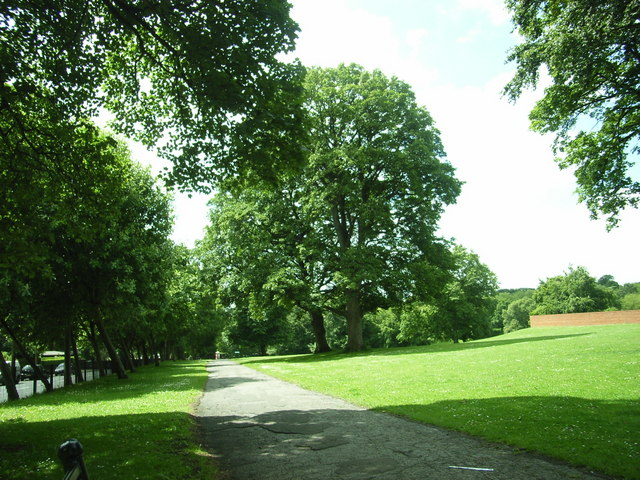
- A treelined footpath at Potternewton Park
- Interactive map of Potternewton Park
- Location: Chapeltown, Leeds, West Yorkshire
- Coordinates: 53°49′10″N 1°31′28″W
- Area: 32 acres (13 ha)
- Operator: Leeds City Council

Potternewton Park is a public park located in Chapeltown, approximately two miles north of Leeds city centre, West Yorkshire, England.

Covering 32 acres, the park's attractions include open parkland, flower beds, a bowling green, a playground and sports facilities, including a skate park and basketball court, as well as a giant chessboard.

The park also hosts the annual Leeds West Indian Carnival.
