= Chapel Allerton (ward) =

Electoral ward in Leeds, England

- Chapel Allerton highlighted within Leeds
- Population: 18,455 (2023 electorate)
- Metropolitan borough: City of Leeds
- Metropolitan county: West Yorkshire
- Region: Yorkshire and the Humber
- Country: England
- Sovereign state: United Kingdom
- UK Parliament: Leeds North East
- Councillors: Jane Dowson (Labour); Mohammed Rafique (Labour); Cristiana Mirosanu (Independent (Note: Elected as Green))

Chapel Allerton is an electoral ward of Leeds City Council in north Leeds, West Yorkshire, incorporating the suburb of the same name, Chapeltown, Potternewton and the southern part of the historic area of Scott Hall.

== Councillors since 1980 ==
Election	Councillor	Councillor	Councillor
1980	Garth Frankland (Lab)	Cedric Clarke (Lab)	Neil Taggart (Lab)
1982	Garth Frankland (Lab)	Cedric Clarke (Lab)	Neil Taggart (Lab)
1983	Garth Frankland (Lab)	Cedric Clarke (Lab)	Neil Taggart (Lab)
1984	Garth Frankland (Lab)	Cedric Clarke (Lab)	Neil Taggart (Lab)
1986	Garth Frankland (Lab)	Cedric Clarke (Lab)	Neil Taggart (Lab)
1987	Garth Frankland (Lab)	Cedric Clarke (Lab)	Neil Taggart (Lab)
1988	Garth Frankland (Lab)	Cedric Clarke (Lab)	Neil Taggart (Lab)
1990	Garth Frankland (Lab)	Cedric Clarke (Lab)	Neil Taggart (Lab)
1991	Garth Frankland (Lab)	Norma Hutchinson (Lab)	Neil Taggart (Lab)
1992	Garth Frankland (Lab)	Norma Hutchinson (Lab)	Neil Taggart (Lab)
1994	Garth Frankland (Lab)	Norma Hutchinson (Lab)	Neil Taggart (Lab)
1995	Garth Frankland (Lab)	Norma Hutchinson (Lab)	Neil Taggart (Lab)
1996	Garth Frankland (Lab)	Norma Hutchinson (Lab)	Neil Taggart (Lab)
1998	Garth Frankland (Lab)	Norma Hutchinson (Lab)	Neil Taggart (Lab)
1999	Garth Frankland (Lab)	Norma Hutchinson (Lab)	Neil Taggart (Lab)
2000?	Garth Frankland (Left)	Norma Hutchinson (Lab)	Neil Taggart (Lab)
2000	Eileen Moxon (Lab) (Note: Moxon was previously a Weetwood ward councillor from 1990 to 1998.)	Norma Hutchinson (Lab)	Neil Taggart (Lab)
2002	Eileen Moxon (Lab)	Norma Hutchinson (Lab)	Neil Taggart (Lab)
2003	Eileen Moxon (Lab)	Norma Hutchinson (Lab)	Neil Taggart (Lab) (Note: At the next election in 2004, Taggart successfully stood to be one of the three new Labour Councillors for the new Bramley and Stanningley ward. Jane Dowson replaced Taggart whilst his two fellow ward councillors did not stand for re-election and retired.)
2004	Sharon Hamilton (Lab)	Mohammed Rafique (Lab)	Jane Dowson (Lab)
2006	Sharon Hamilton (Lab)	Mohammed Rafique (Lab)	Jane Dowson (Lab)
2007	Sharon Hamilton (Lab) (Note: For the next election in 2008, Hamilton did not seek re-selection as the Labour candidate for the ward, standing unsuccessfully as their candidate for Roundhay ward. She would later be elected in 2010 as a councillor for Moortown ward.)	Mohammed Rafique (Lab)	Jane Dowson (Lab)
2008	Eileen Taylor (Lab)	Mohammed Rafique (Lab)	Jane Dowson (Lab)
2010	Eileen Taylor (Lab)	Mohammed Rafique (Lab)	Jane Dowson (Lab)
2011	Eileen Taylor (Lab)	Mohammed Rafique (Lab)	Jane Dowson (Lab)
2012	Eileen Taylor (Lab)	Mohammed Rafique (Lab)	Jane Dowson (Lab)
2014	Eileen Taylor (Lab)	Mohammed Rafique (Lab)	Jane Dowson (Lab)
2015	Eileen Taylor (Lab)	Mohammed Rafique (Lab)	Jane Dowson (Lab)
2016	Eileen Taylor (Lab)	Mohammed Rafique (Lab)	Jane Dowson (Lab)
2018	Eileen Taylor (Lab)	Mohammed Rafique (Lab)	Jane Dowson (Lab)
2019	Eileen Taylor (Lab)	Mohammed Rafique (Lab)	Jane Dowson (Lab)
2021	Eileen Taylor (Lab)	Mohammed Rafique (Lab)	Jane Dowson (Lab)
2022	Eileen Taylor (Lab)	Mohammed Rafique (Lab)	Jane Dowson (Lab)
2023	Eileen Taylor (Lab)	Mohammed Rafique (Lab)	Jane Dowson (Lab)
2024	Eileen Taylor (Lab)	Mohammed Rafique (Lab)	Jane Dowson (Lab)
2026	Cristiana Mirosanu (GPEW)	Mohammed Rafique (Lab)	Jane Dowson (Lab)
September 2026	Cristiana Mirosanu* (Ind) (Note: As of September 2026, Mirosanu sits as an independent councillor.)	Mohammed Rafique* (Lab)	Jane Dowson* (Lab)

indicates seat up for re-election. indicates councillor defection. * indicates incumbent councillor.

== Elections since 2010 ==
=== May 2026 ===
2026
Party	Candidate	Votes	%	±%
Green	Cristiana Mirosanu	3,520	45.1	▲24.1
Labour Co-op	Eileen Taylor	2,971	38.1	▼24.6
Reform	Yaseen Saddique	594	7.6	N/A
Conservative	Kevin Irving Black	382	4.9	▼1.3
Liberal Democrats	Darren Finlay	287	3.7	▲1.2
SDP	Richard Cowles	55	0.7	▼0.4
Majority		549	7.0	▼34.6
Turnout		7,809	42.8	▲6.1
Rejected ballots		29	0.4	
Registered electors		18,331		
Green gain from Labour		Swing	▲24.3	

=== May 2024 ===
2024
Party	Candidate	Votes	%	±%
Labour	Mohammed Rafique*	4,139	62.6	−10.8
Green	Bobak Walker	1,392	21.0	+9.2
Conservative	Kevin Black	409	6.2	−0.2
Alliance for Green Socialism	Mike Davies	222	3.4	+0.4
Yorkshire	Ryan Kett	212	3.2	New
Liberal Democrats	Majd Qahwaji	166	2.5	−1.5
SDP	Richard Cowles	75	1.1	+0.3
Majority		2,747	41.6	−20.1
Turnout		6,711	36.7	+3.5
Labour hold		Swing	-10.0	

=== May 2023 ===
2023
Party	Candidate	Votes	%	±%
Labour	Jane Dowson*	4,505	73.4	−0.4
Green	Bobak Walker	721	11.8	+0.8
Conservative	Safaraz Ahad	390	6.4	−1.3
Liberal Democrats	Aqila Choudhury	246	4.0	−0.4
Alliance for Green Socialism	Mike Davies	183	3.0	+0.4
SDP	Sasha Watson	48	0.8	N/A
Majority		3,784	61.7	−1.1
Turnout		6,134	33.2	−0.8
Labour hold		Swing		

=== May 2022 ===
2022
Party	Candidate	Votes	%	±%
Labour	Eileen Taylor*	4,650	73.8	+6.4
Green	Bobak Walker	691	11.0	−1.5
Conservative	Shazar Ahad	488	7.7	−1.8
Liberal Democrats	James Marshall	278	4.4	−1.4
Alliance for Green Socialism	Mike Davies	164	2.6	−0.5
Majority		3,959	62.8	+7.9
Turnout		6,303	34.0	−5.2
Labour hold		Swing		

=== May 2021 ===
2021
Party	Candidate	Votes	%	±%
Labour	Mohammed Rafique*	4,903	67.4	−4.7
Green	Bobak Walker	912	12.5	+0.6
Conservative	Shaz Ahad	690	9.5	+2.6
Liberal Democrats	James Marshall	419	5.8	−0.2
Alliance for Green Socialism	Mike Davies	227	3.1	+0.0
SDP	Richard Cowles	55	0.1	N/A
Majority		3,991	54.9	−5.3
Turnout		7,274	39.2	+5.5
Labour hold		Swing		

=== May 2019 ===
2019
Party	Candidate	Votes	%	±%
Labour	Jane Dowson*	4,243	72.1	+4.9
Green	Bobak Walker	701	11.9	−0.4
Conservative	Shaz Ahad	404	6.9	−2.2
Liberal Democrats	Rory Mason	353	6.0	−2.2
Alliance for Green Socialism	Mike Davies	185	3.1	−2.0
Majority		3,542	60.2	+7.3
Turnout		5,955	33.7	−4.4
Labour hold		Swing	+2.7	

=== May 2018 ===
2018
Party	Candidate	Votes	%	±%
Labour	Eileen Taylor*	4,809	65.2	−4.3
Labour	Mohammed Rafique*	4,728		
Labour	Jane Dowson*	4,708		
Green	Justine Merton-Scott	907	12.3	+4.3
Green	Bobak Walker	703		
Conservative	Kevin Black	672	9.1	+0.1
Liberal Democrats	Susan Harris	608	8.2	+3.6
Conservative	Linda Feldman	604		
Conservative	David Myers	565		
Alliance for Green Socialism	Mike Davies	379	5.1	+0.7
Majority		3,902	52.9	−7.6
Turnout		17,927	38.1	+2.1
Labour hold		Swing		
Labour hold		Swing		
Labour hold		Swing		

=== May 2016 ===
2016
Party	Candidate	Votes	%	±%
Labour	Eileen Taylor*	4,169	69.5	+11.5
Conservative	David Bernard Myers	541	9.0	+6.2
Green	Keith Mollison	464	7.7	+6.4
UKIP	Sheila Valerie Store	290	4.8	+4.8
Liberal Democrats	Darren Finlay	275	4.6	+3.3
Alliance for Green Socialism	Mike Davies	262	4.4	−0.6
Majority		3,628	60.5	+17.7
Turnout		6,001	36.0	
Labour hold		Swing		

=== May 2015 ===
2015
Party	Candidate	Votes	%	±%
Labour	Mohammed Rafique*	6,467	58.0	−5.6
Conservative	Farzana Arif	1,692	15.2	+1.8
Green	Mags Shevlin	1,568	14.1	+6.6
Liberal Democrats	Mark Harris	876	7.9	+0.2
Alliance for Green Socialism	Mike Davies	555	5.0	−2.8
Majority		4,775	42.8	−7.4
Turnout		11,158	62.7	
Labour hold		Swing	-3.7	

=== May 2014 ===
2014
Party	Candidate	Votes	%	±%
Labour	Jane Dowson*	3,683	61.3	
Conservative	Farzana Arif	746	12.4	
Green	Emma Carter	736	12.3	
Alliance for Green Socialism	Mike Davies	515	8.6	
Liberal Democrats	Aqila Choudhry	326	5.4	
Majority		2,937		
Turnout		6,006	34.59	
Labour hold		Swing		

=== May 2012 ===
2012
Party	Candidate	Votes	%	±%
Labour	Eileen Taylor*	3,588	67.4	+3.7
Conservative	David Myers	550	10.3	−3.1
Alliance for Green Socialism	Mike Davies	483	9.1	+1.3
Green	Colin Noble	409	7.7	+0.2
Liberal Democrats	Adam Slack	297	5.6	−2.2
Majority		3,038	57.0	+6.8
Turnout		5,327		
Labour hold		Swing	+3.4	

=== May 2011 ===
2011
Party	Candidate	Votes	%	±%
Labour	Mohammed Rafique*	4,121	63.6	+8.3
Conservative	David Myers	868	13.4	−0.6
Alliance for Green Socialism	Mike Davies	502	7.8	−0.1
Liberal Democrats	Adam Slack	501	7.7	−12.8
Green	Colin Noble	484	7.5	+7.5
Majority		3,253	50.2	+15.4
Turnout		6,476	38	
Labour hold		Swing	+4.4	

=== May 2010 ===
2010
Party	Candidate	Votes	%	±%
Labour	Jane Dowson*	5,796	55.3	+11.1
Liberal Democrats	Adam Slack	2,154	20.6	−1.8
Conservative	Daniel Paterson	1,471	14.0	−0.5
Alliance for Green Socialism	John Frankland	825	7.9	−1.2
BNP	Dean Marshall	230	2.2	−1.0
Majority		3,642	34.8	+13.0
Turnout		10,476	62.9	+31.3
Labour hold		Swing	+6.4	

== See also ==
- Listed buildings in Leeds (Chapel Allerton Ward)
