= Leeds West Indian Carnival =

Annual carnival held in Leeds, UK

Leeds Carnival
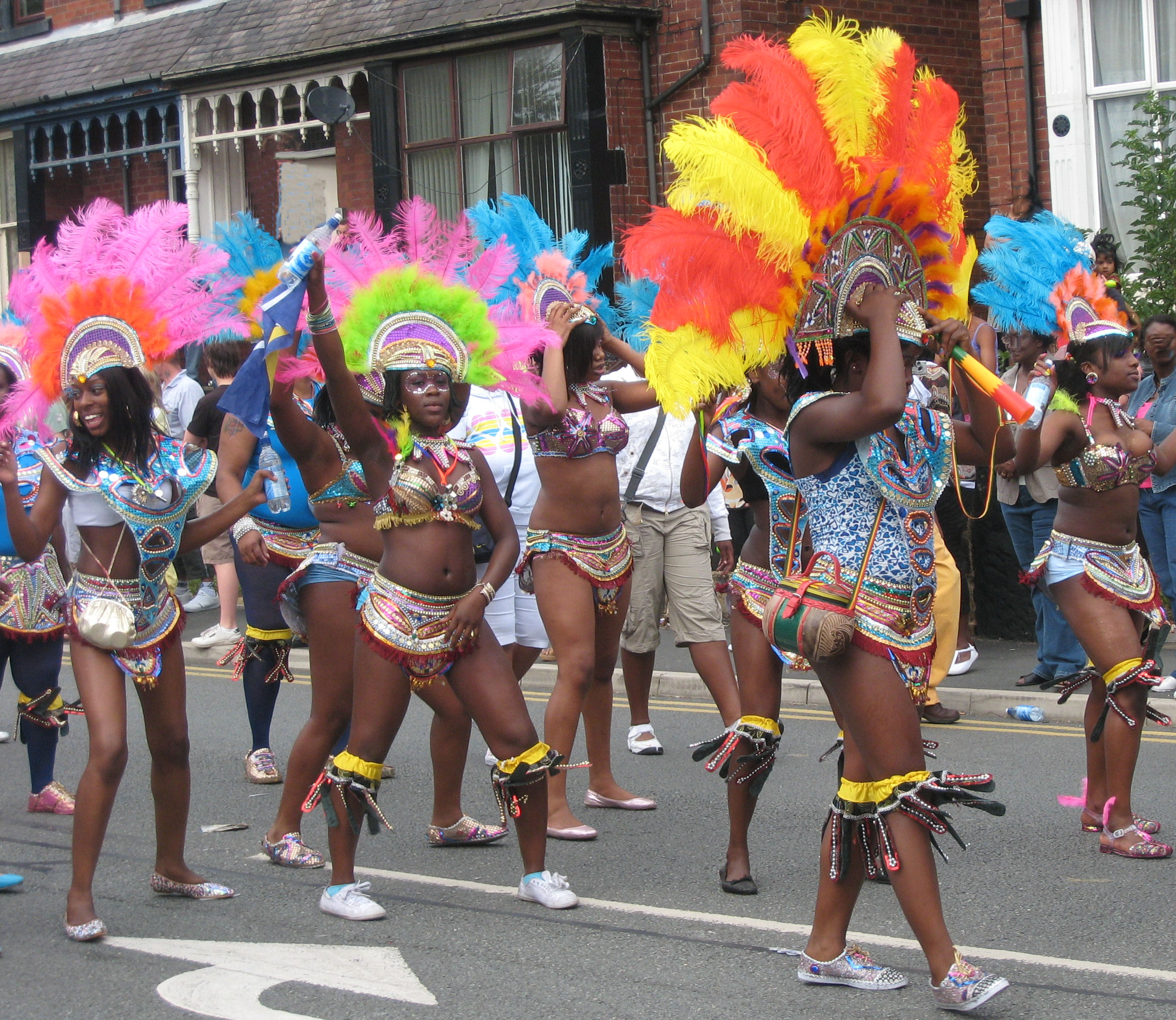
- Carnival procession, Leeds 2008
- Genre: Carnival
- Frequency: Annually – August Bank Holiday
- Locations: Chapeltown, Leeds, England
- Years active: 1967–present
- Most recent: 24 August 2025 – 25 August 2025
- Next event: 30 August 2026 – 31 August 2026
- Attendance: 150,000
- Website: leedscarnival.co.uk

The Leeds Carnival, also called the Leeds West Indian Carnival or the Chapeltown Carnival, is one of the longest running West Indian carnivals in Europe, having been going since 1967. The carnival is held in the Chapeltown and Harehills parts of Leeds every August bank holiday weekend. Attendance is estimated at 150,000.

It is a three-day event, climaxing in a carnival procession on Bank Holiday Monday, which starts and finishes in Potternewton Park in Chapeltown. A parade of floats and dancers makes its way along Harehills Avenue, down Roundhay Road in Harehills, along Barrack Road and back along Chapeltown Road to the park, where a wide range of stages and stalls provide entertainment and refreshment for carnival-goers. Since 2005 this event has been covered by BBC Radio 1Xtra in conjunction with Notting Hill Carnival.

== History ==
Its founders were Arthur France, then a Leeds University student from Nevis, who is longstanding Chairman; Ian Charles, who was still Co-ordinator in 2008; and Gertrude Paul, a teacher. Arthur France proposed what would be the first Caribbean-style outdoor carnival organized by people of Caribbean origin in Europe. As the local Caribbean association was not forthcoming, he formed his own committee, and Ian Charles's home became a factory for costumes. Five contestants entered the first Carnival Queen Show, won by Vicky Seal as the Sun Goddess. They joined bands and dancers in a procession from Potternewton Park to Leeds Town Hall, where a steel band competition was followed by a dance. About 1,000 people attended. The Leeds performers were invited to participate in the Notting Hill Carnival later the same year.

In the 1970s a procession route was established from Potternewton Park and back again via the city centre. The steel bands were on human-powered wheeled platforms. In 1977 crowds of 10,000 were reported.

The 1980s established a shorter route around Chapeltown and Harehills, and also sponsorship by local organizations. A Carnival Prince and Princess (children aged three to 13) were also chosen. Attendance reached 40,000 in 1988.

In 1990 three people died during violence in the area afterwards. The decade saw increased professionalism by the now very experienced Carnival Committee and the introduction of lorries to carry bands. 1997 was the 30th anniversary and Arthur France received the MBE for his work with the local community.

2007 was the 40th anniversary, with crowds of 100,000 for the first time. It was also the 25th anniversary of the Leeds West Indian Centre, and the bicentenary of the British abolition of transatlantic slavery. Ian Charles also received the MBE.

In 2020 it was cancelled for the first time, because of the COVID-19 pandemic. It returned in 2022.

== Carnival Queen and King ==
The Carnival Queen is chosen on the Friday before the main event, and in 2008 for the first time a Carnival King was chosen: they were Davina Williams and Tyrone Henry. The 2009 King and Queen were Tony and Nicole Isles, who are father and daughter.

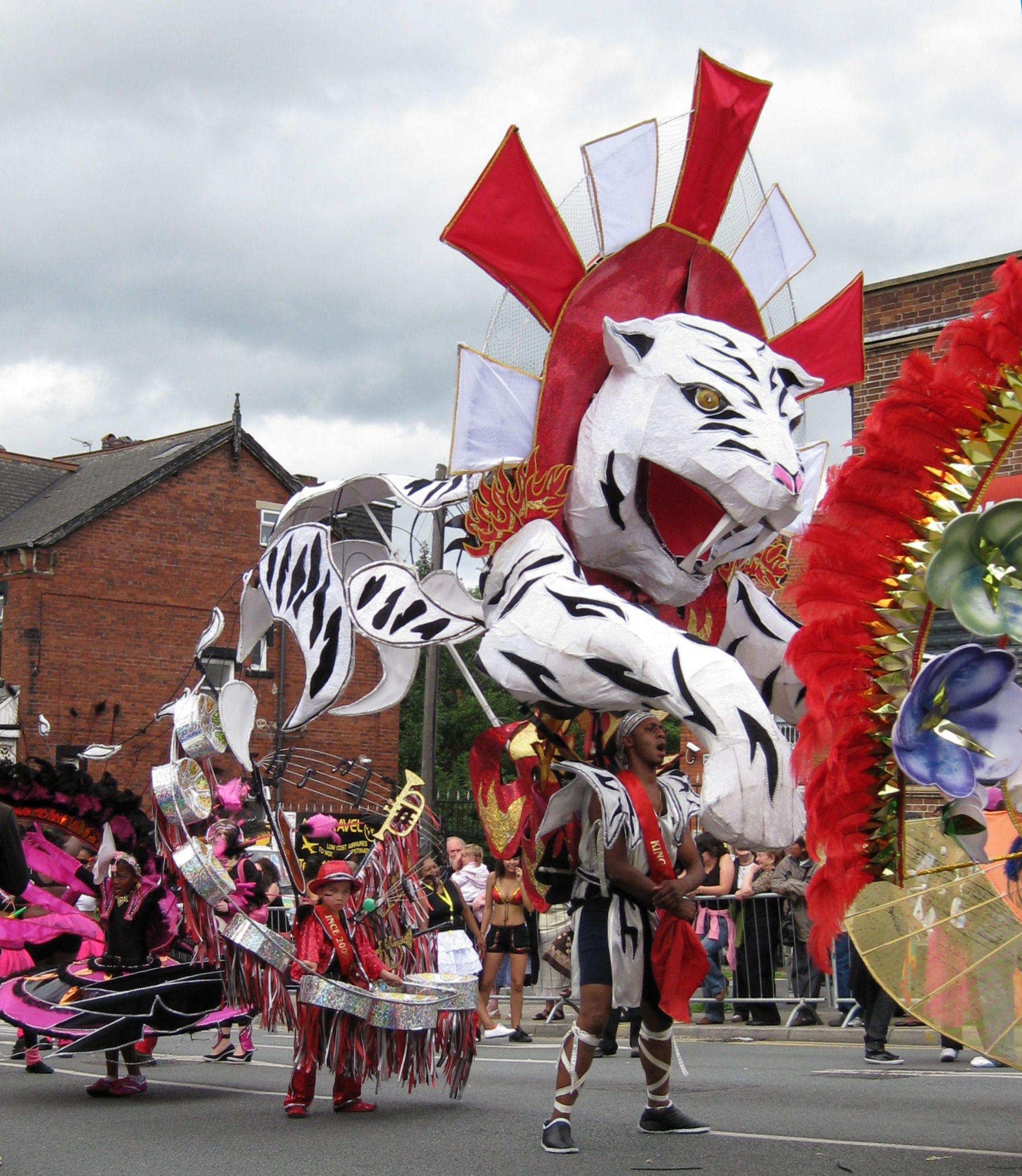
Carnival King 2009

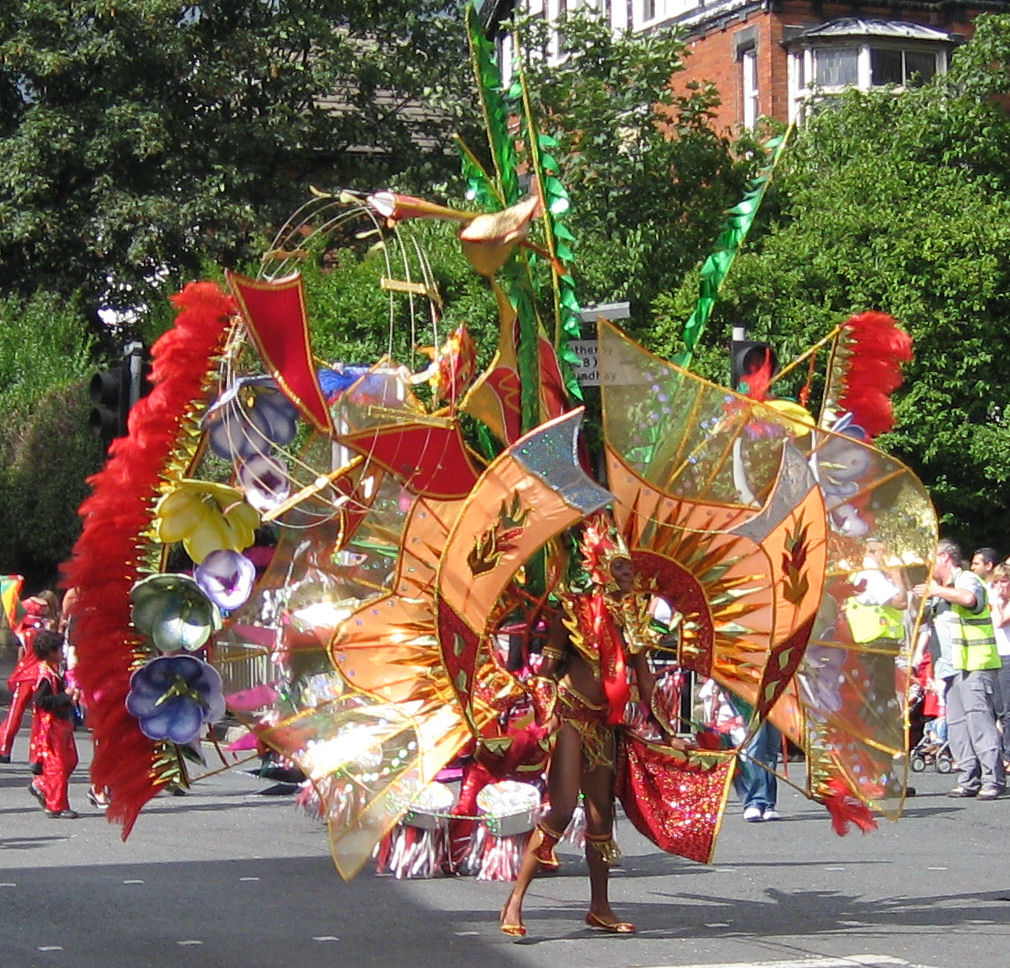
Carnival Queen 2009

== Gallery ==
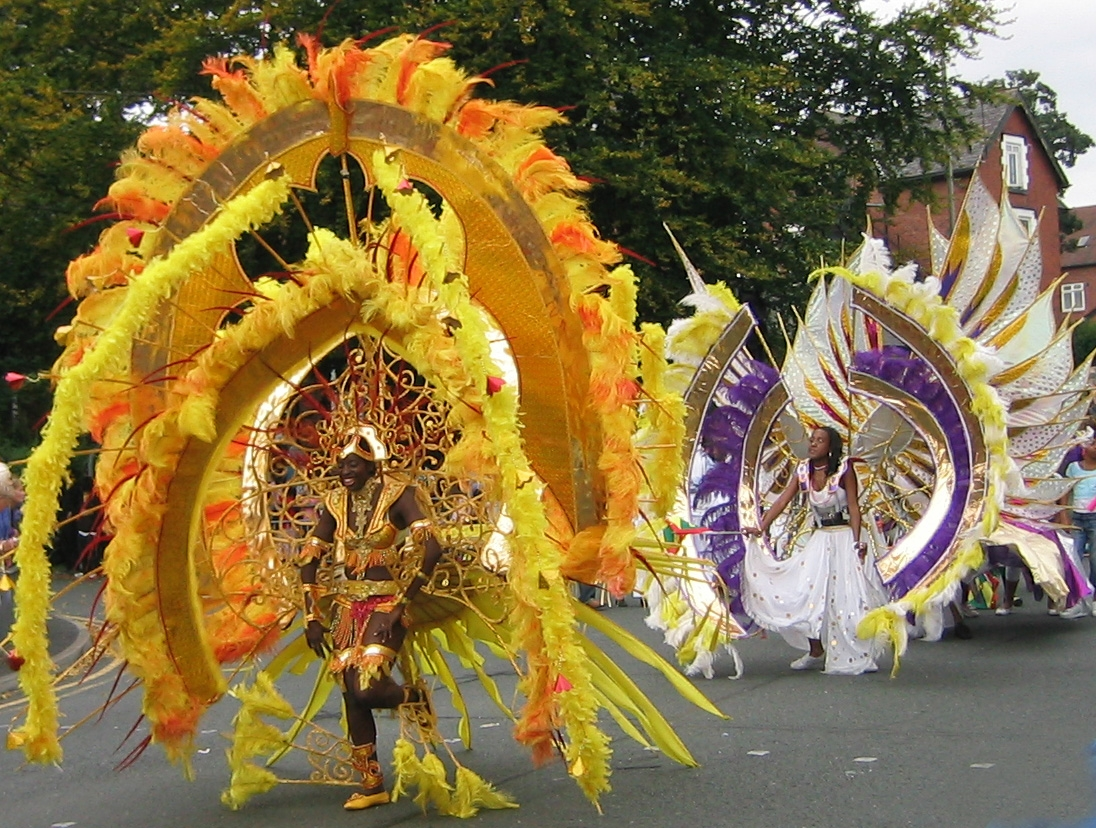
Carnival Procession 2007

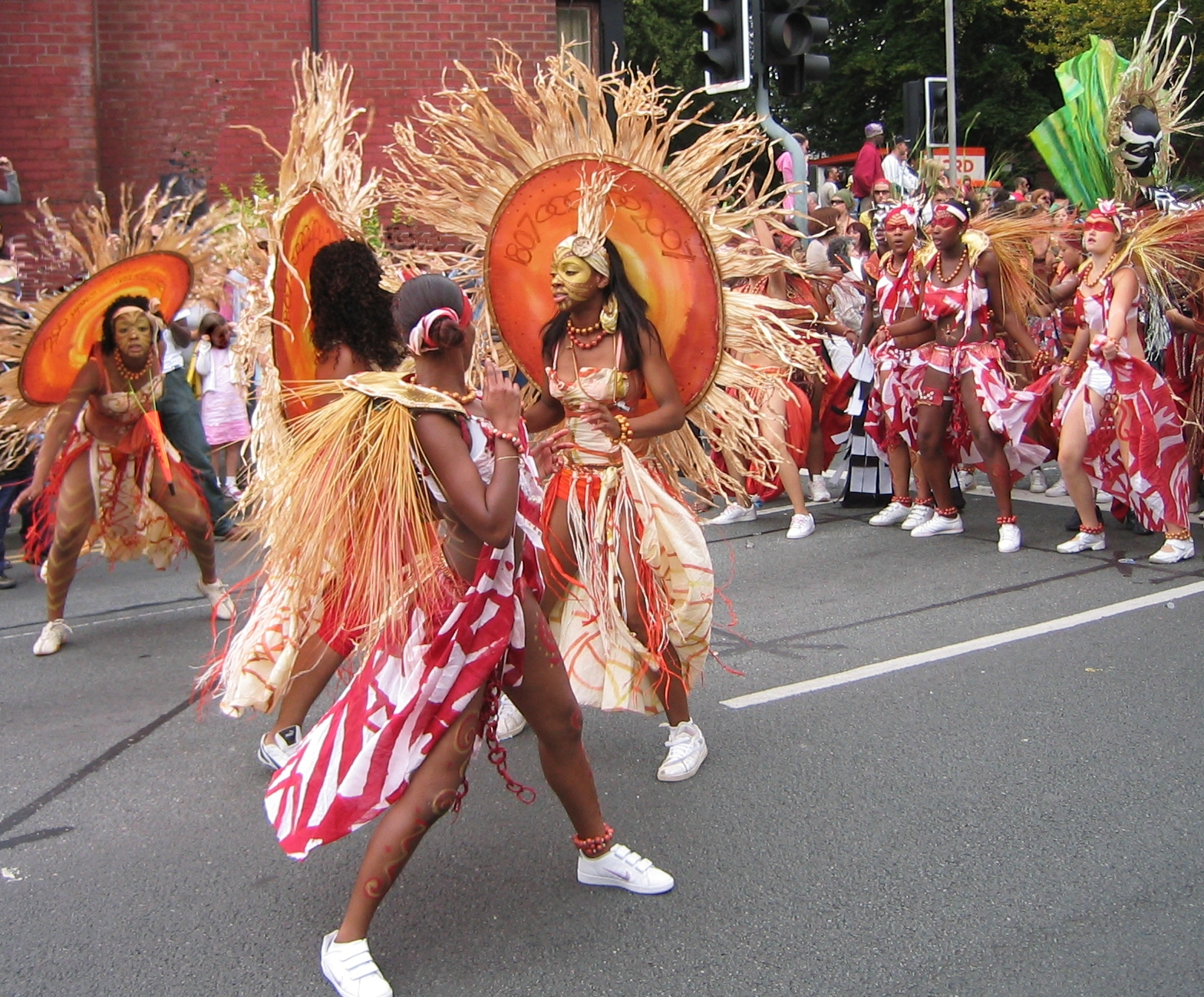
Carnival Procession 2007

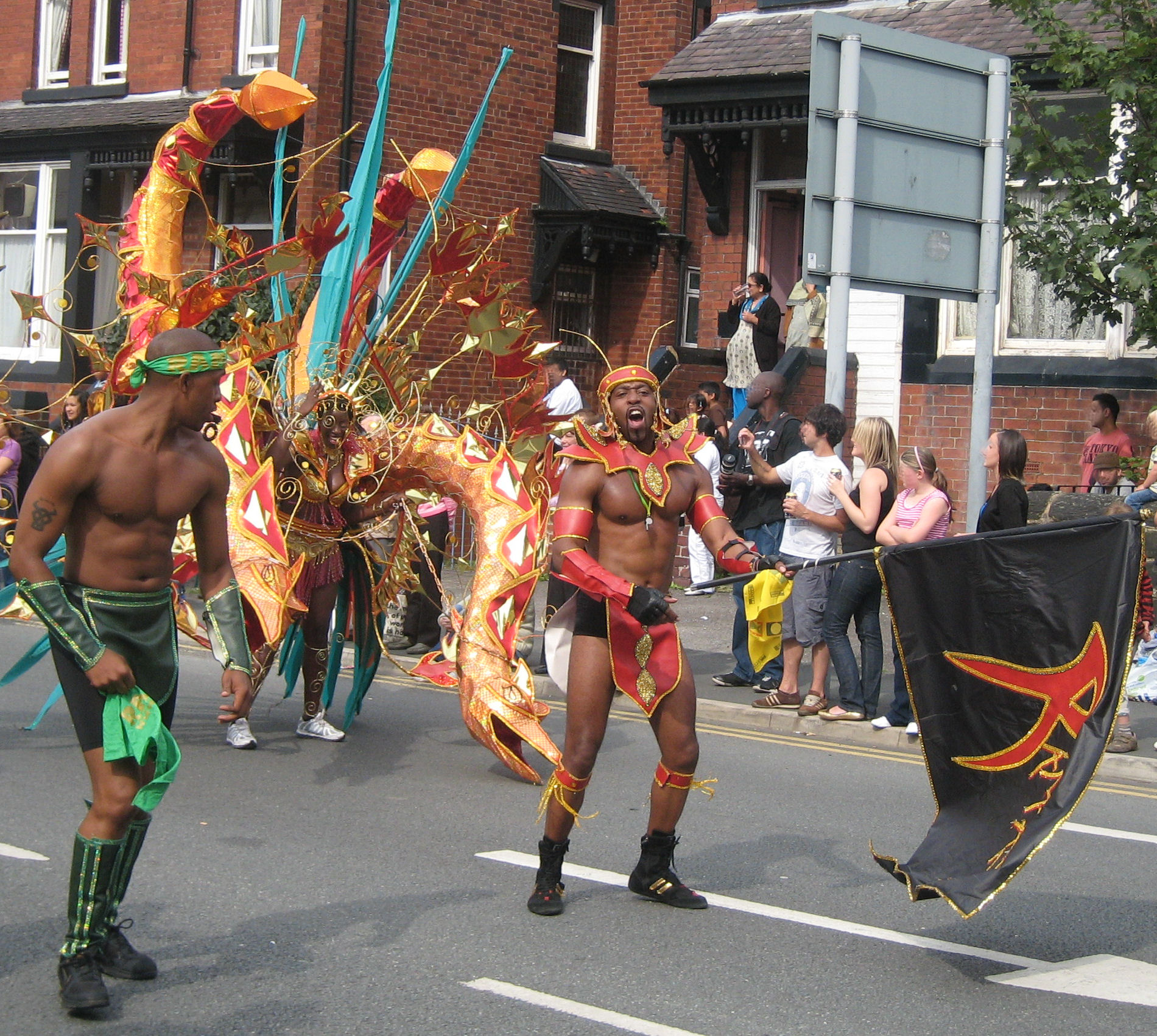
Carnival Procession 2008

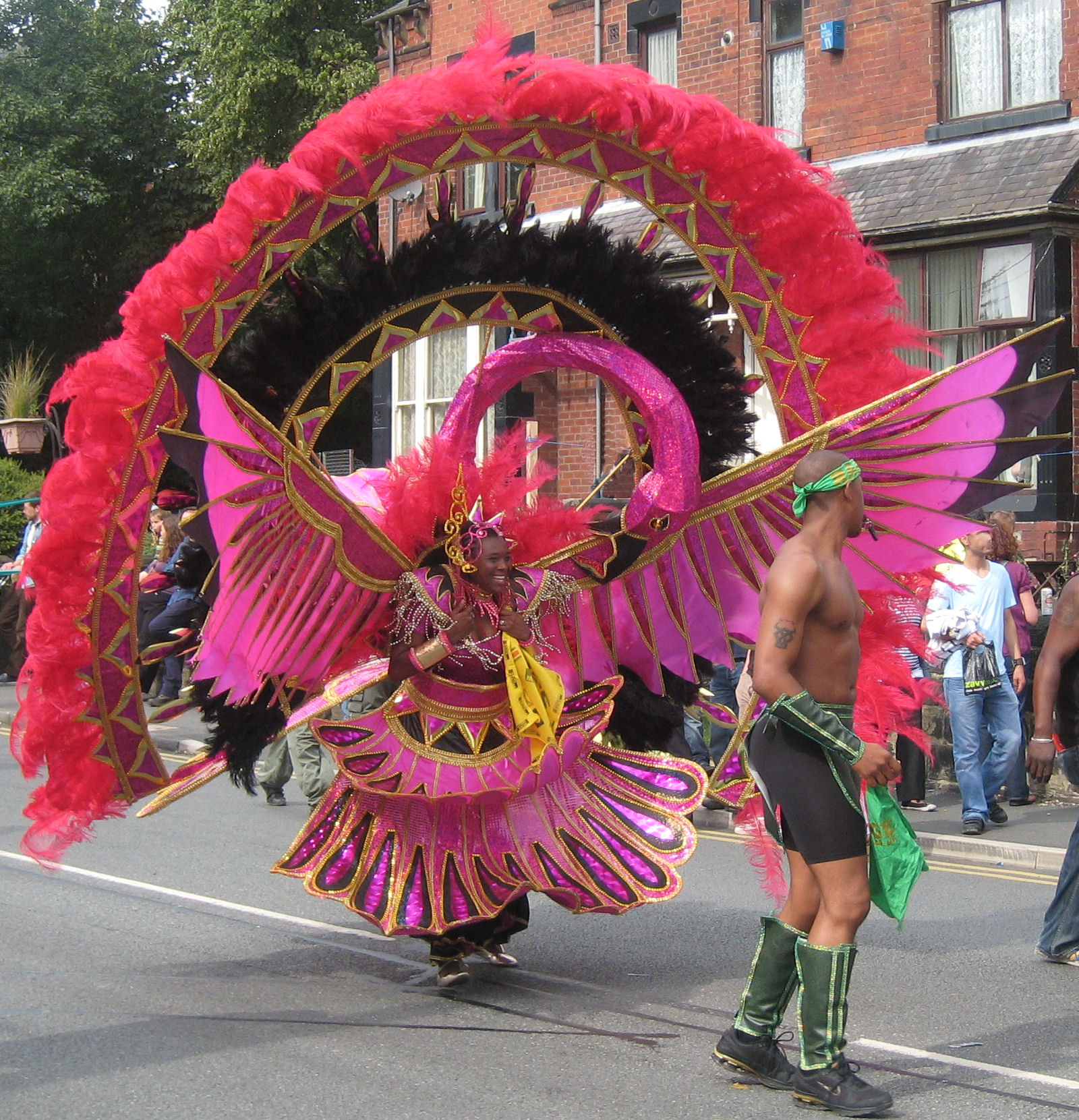
Carnival Procession 2008

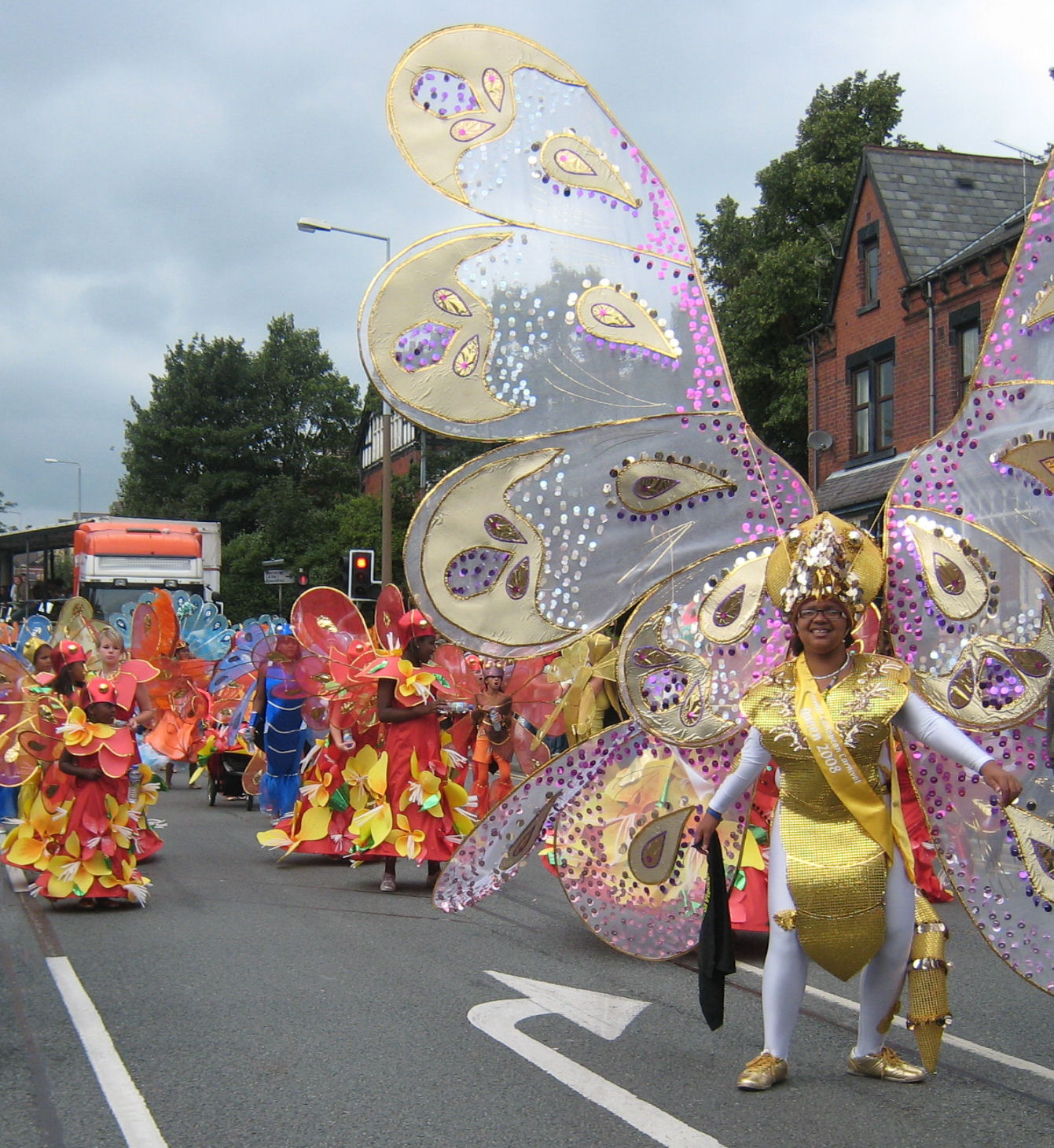
Carnival Procession 2008

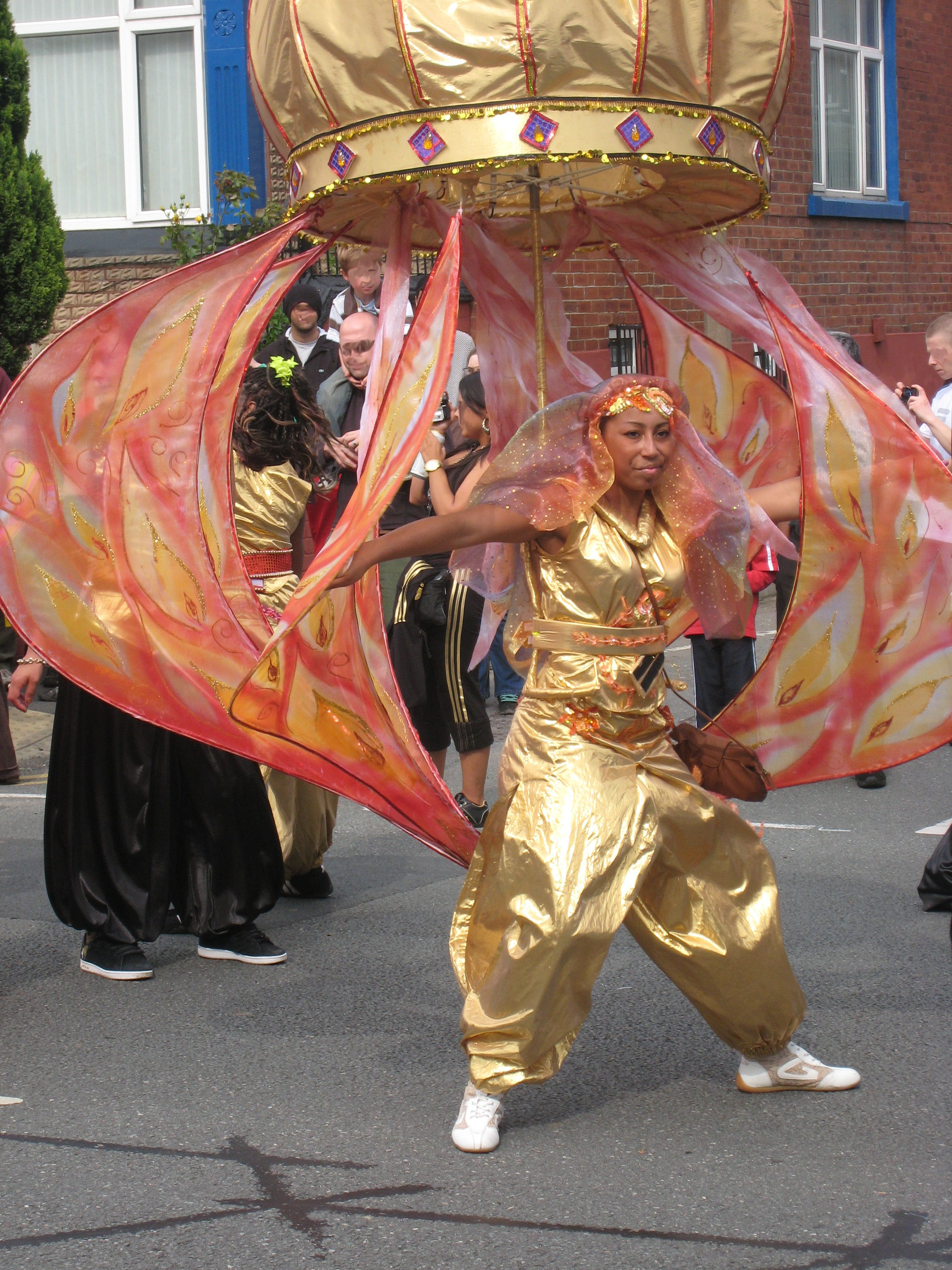
Carnival Procession 2008

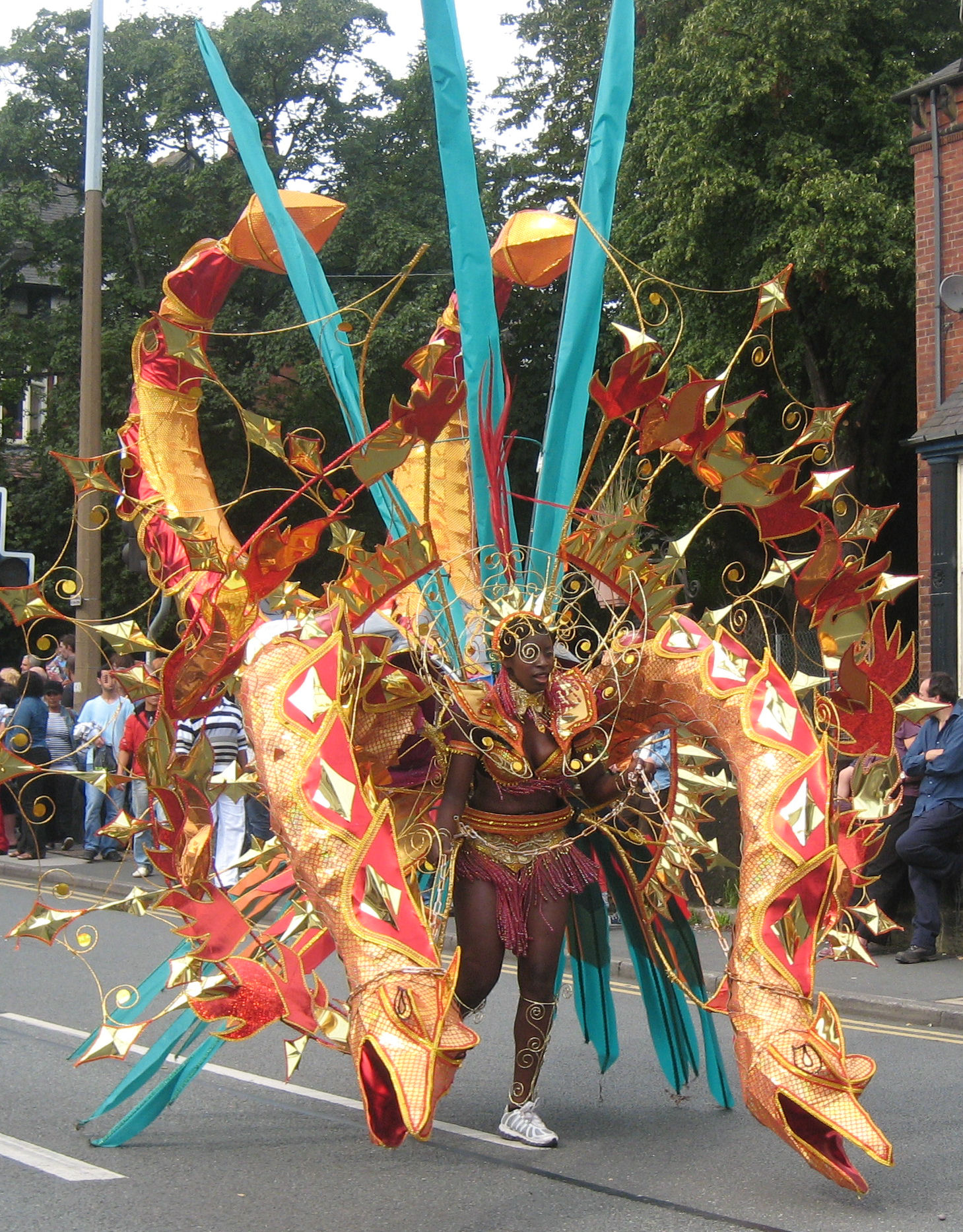
Carnival Procession 2008

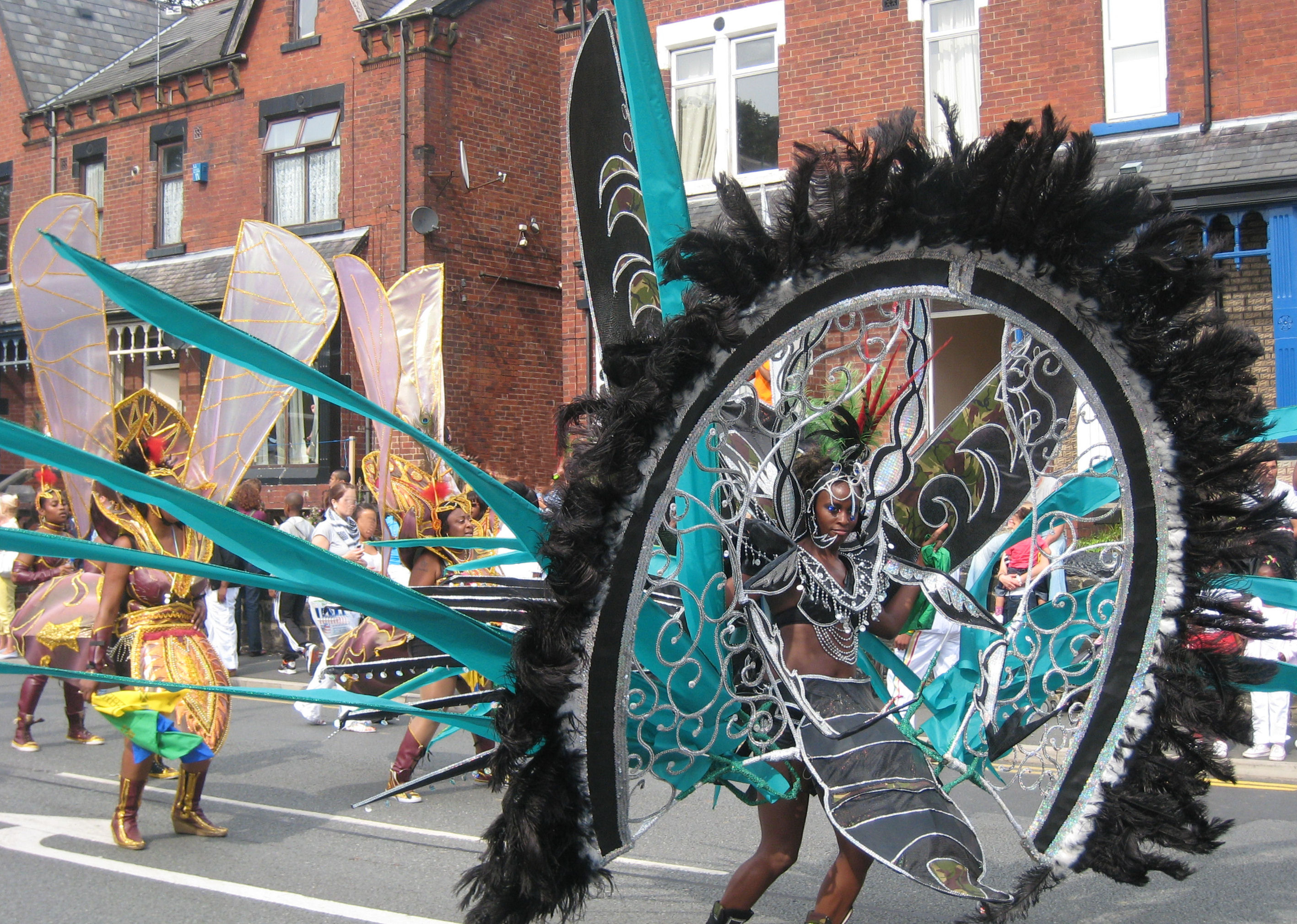
Carnival Procession 2008

== See also ==
- Caribbean Carnival
- British African-Caribbean community
