= Meanwood Beck =

Stream in West Yorkshire, England

Coordinates: 53°50′N 1°35′W

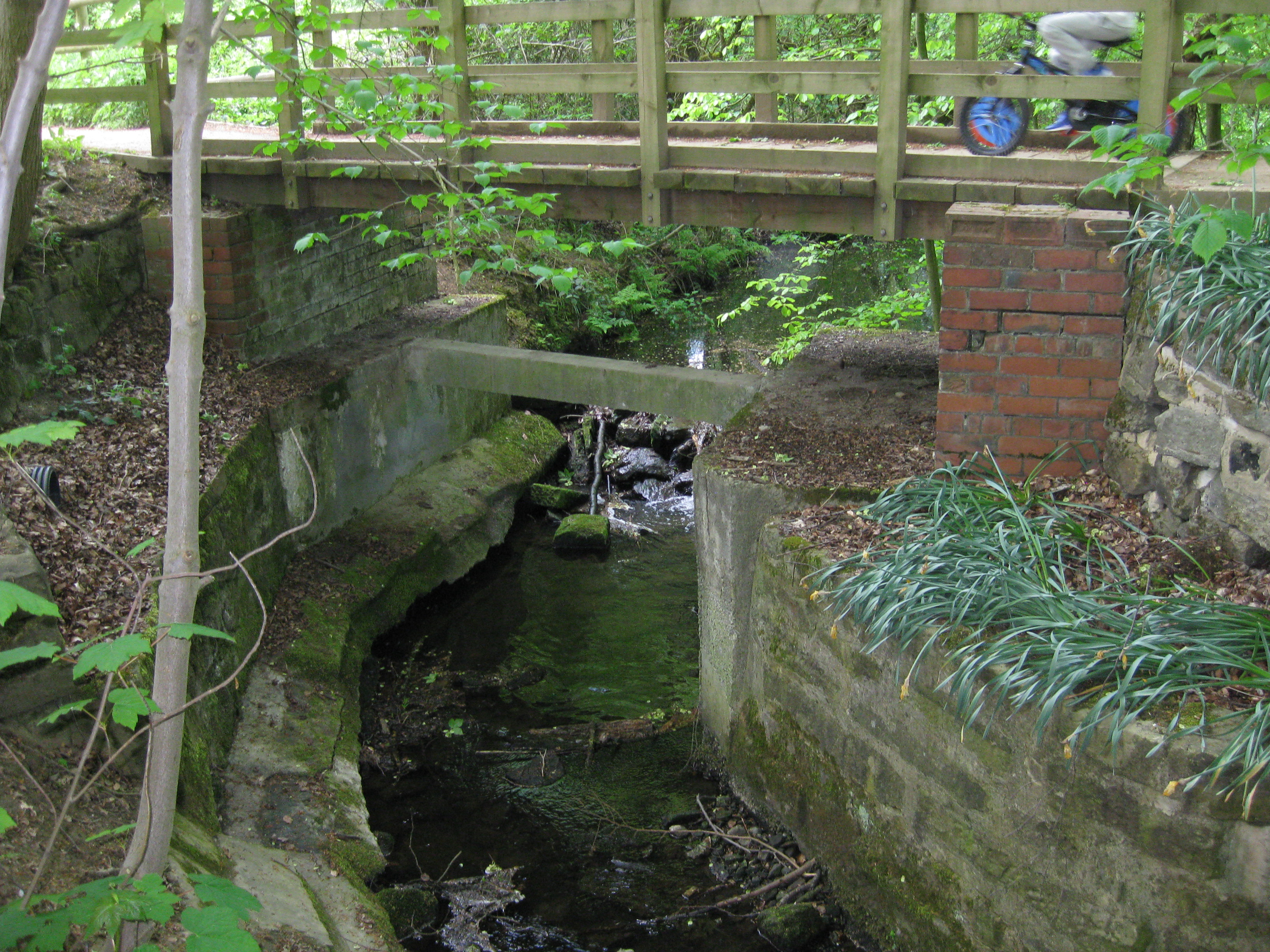
Start of Adel Beck

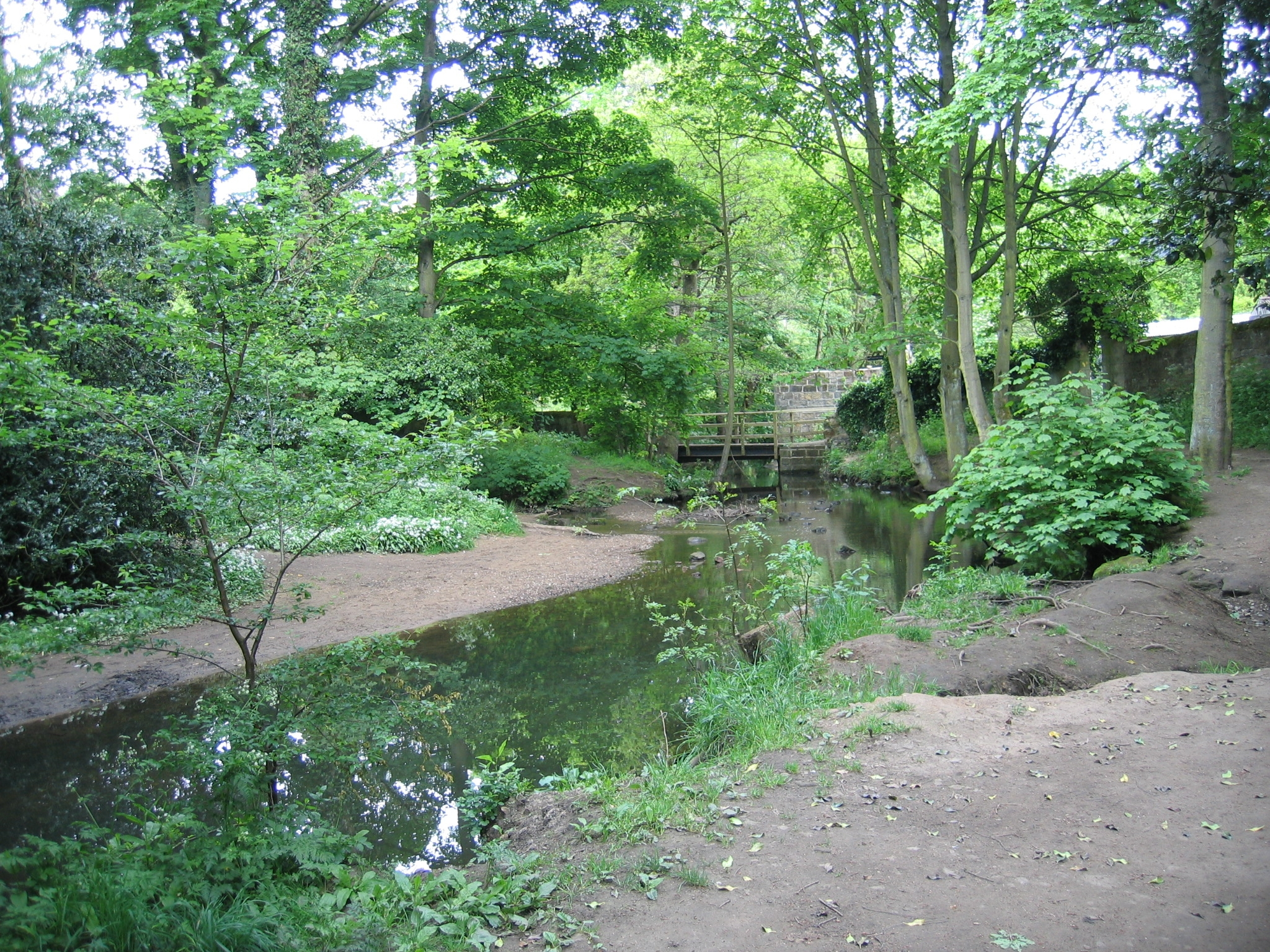
Meanwood Beck in Meanwood Park

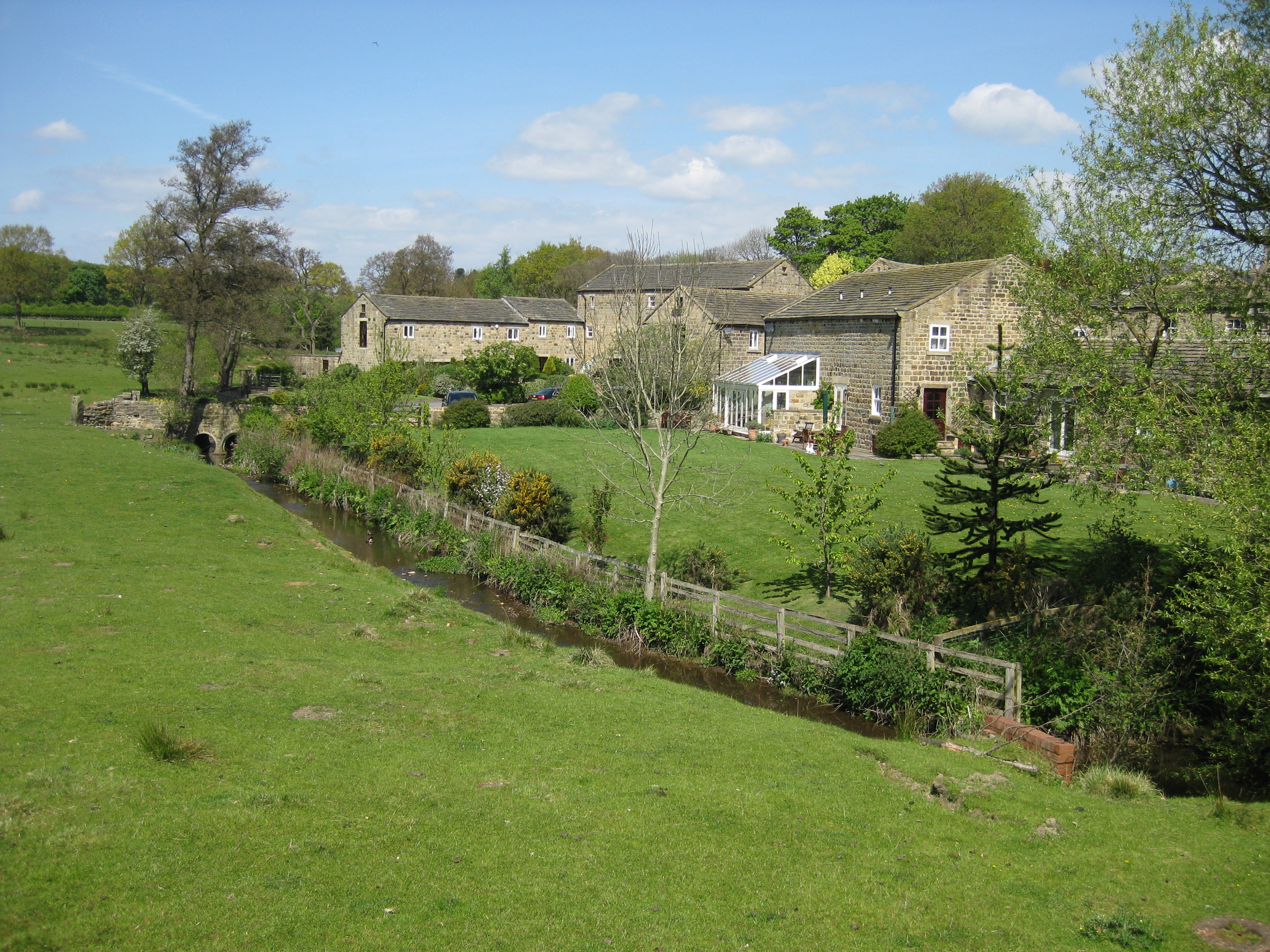
Adel Beck and the former Adel Mill and Farm buildings

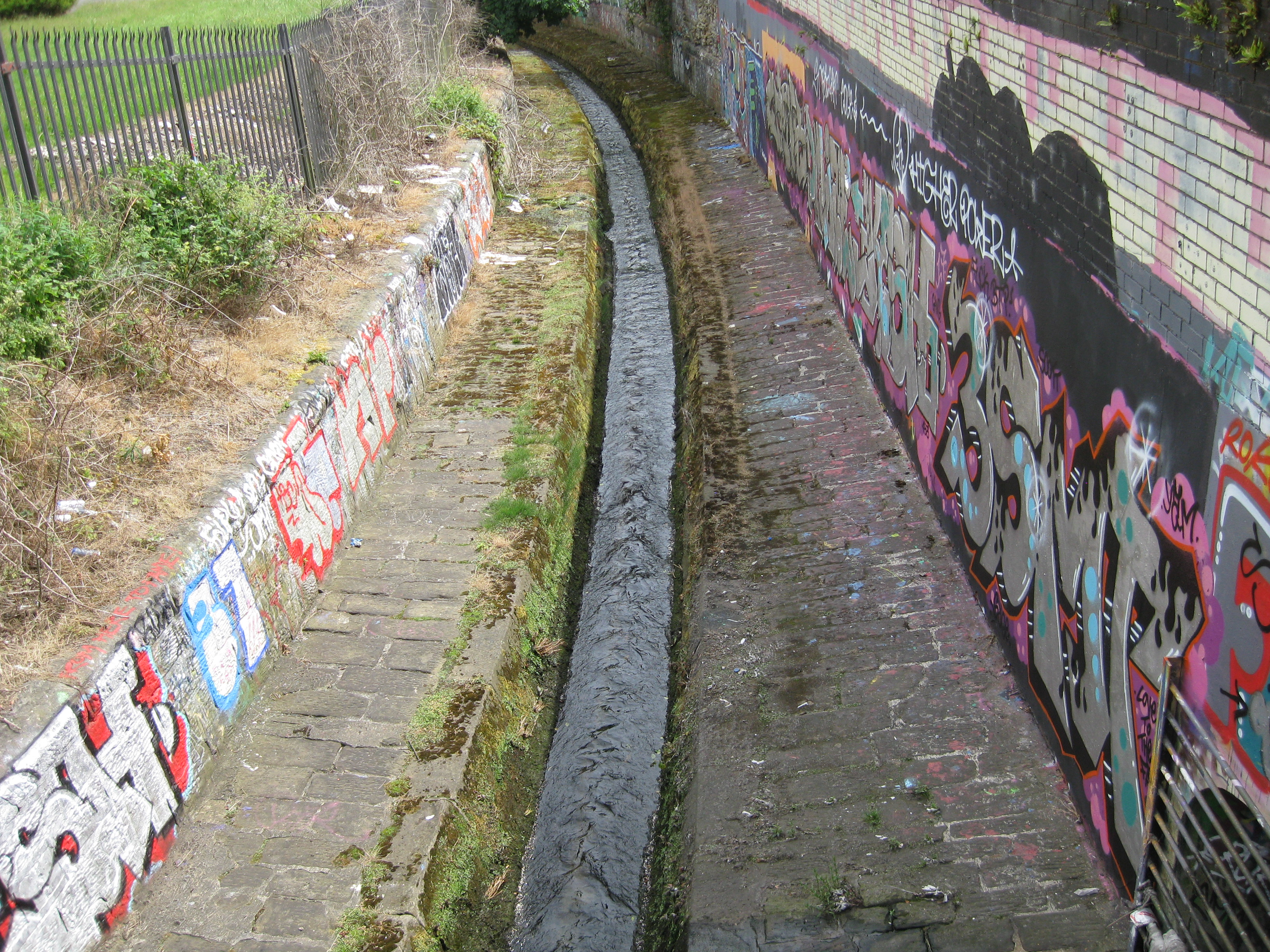
Sheepscar Beck in Buslingthorpe

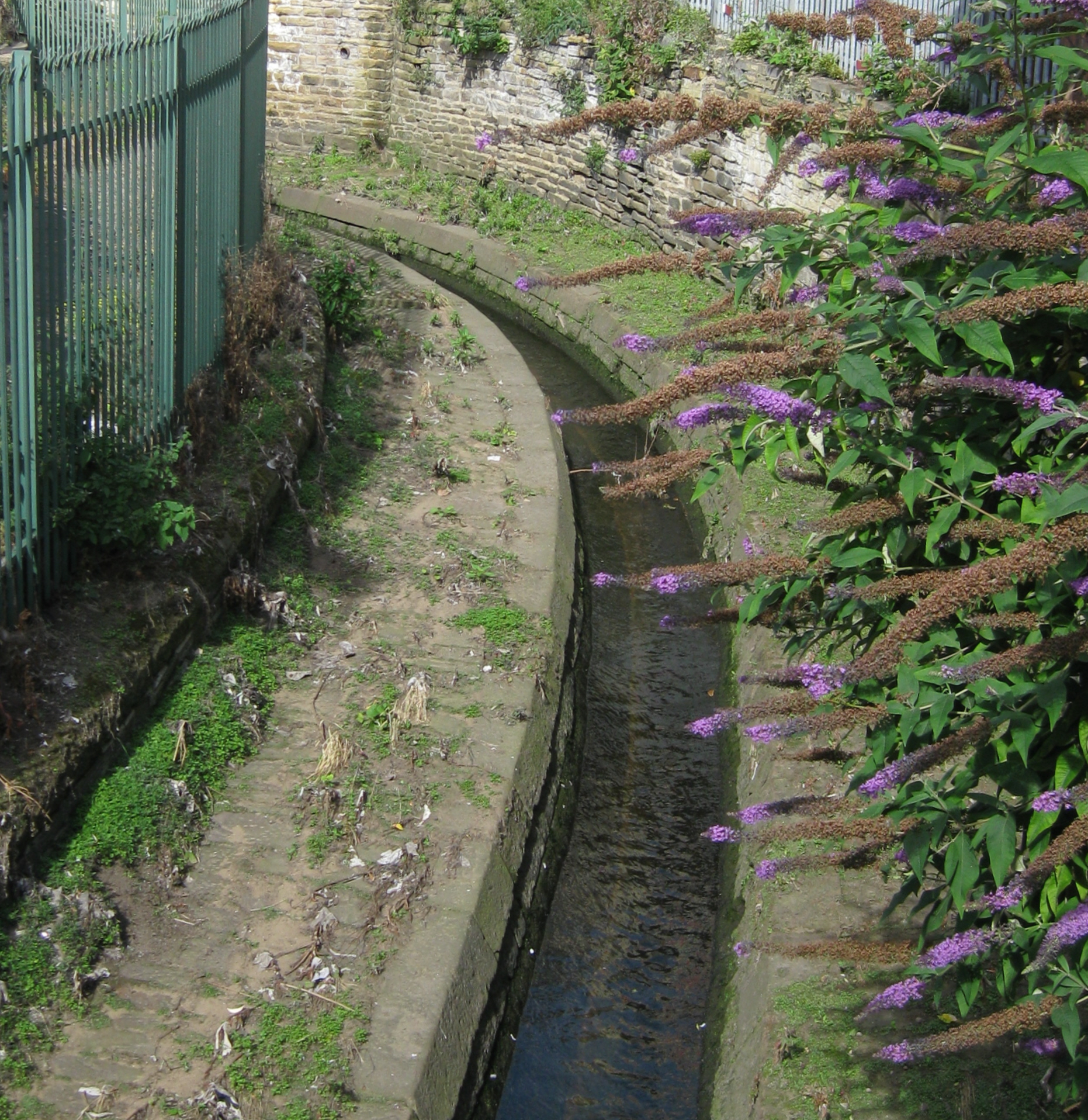
Lady Beck in Mabgate

The Meanwood Beck is a stream in West Yorkshire, England, which flows southwards through Adel, Meanwood and Sheepscar into the River Aire in central Leeds. Different portions of the same watercourse have been referred to as Adel Beck, Carr Beck, Lady Beck, Mabgate Beck, Sheepscar Beck, Timble Beck or Wortley Beck. The Meanwood Valley Trail footpath follows the line of the beck for much of its course.

The ultimate source of the water is Otley Chevin and the Marsh Beck feeds into what is now the Wildfowl Lake (formerly the Black Hill Dam) in Golden Acre Park. According to Ordnance Survey, it is called Adel Beck from the outflow of the lake down to the A6120 Ring Road, then beyond this is the Meanwood Beck. John Cossins' 1775 plan of Leeds shows Sheepscar Beck as essentially the East limits of the town at the time, Adel being some distance away and Meanwood still a wood. It became the Lady Beck from Quarry Hill to the River Aire.

It is of historical importance because it deposited silt into the River Aire. Along with the Hol Beck doing the same from the South-West nearby it led to a fording place and a small community which eventually grew into the town of Leeds.

The beck was previously a source of water for the village of Headingley and two of its earliest bridges led straight to it. The beck carries a much reduced volume of water over recent years as water is collected instead into the many drains in the centre of one of Britain's largest cities.

Meanwood Beck runs through Meanwood Park and Woodhouse Ridge. It provides water and drainage for Meanwood Valley Urban Farm.

In the 16th to 18th centuries it provided power for corn mills. In the 19th century it supplied water for a chemical works and tanneries, one of which, Sugarwell Court, is now a university hall of residence.

The Beck suffered a serious pollution incident on 29 March 1999 when an oil tank at the University of Leeds' Bodington Hall was overfilled and 10,000 litres of oil flowed into the beck. It is also a habitat for the indigenous European crayfish, which is currently threatened in the UK by a plague carried by the Signal crayfish introduced from America. As well as the crayfish there are also bull head fish present which can be found easily with a net and a pair of waders; they generally are located on the stream bed in the mud and silt.
