= Woodhouse Ridge =

Woodland in Leeds, West Yorkshire, England

Coordinates: 53.820061°N 1.560144°W

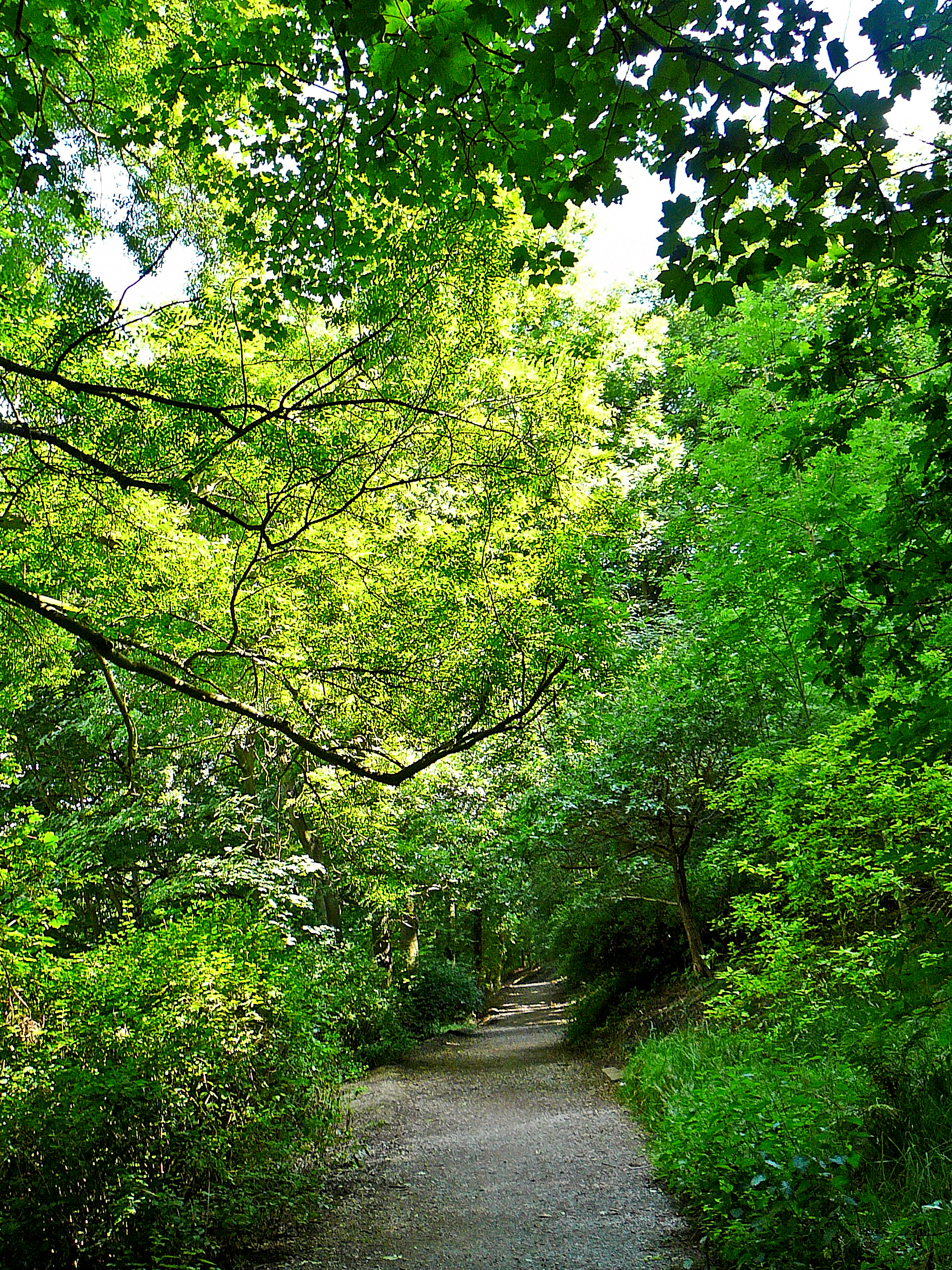
Path through Woodhouse Ridge

Woodhouse Ridge is a strip of woodland on the south west hillside of the Meanwood valley in urban area of Leeds, West Yorkshire, England. Locally known as 'The Ridge', the area is notable as a significant area of mature woodland in an otherwise highly developed urban area. The woods are centred at grid reference 53.820061, -1.560144 and are enclosed by Meanwood Road to the east and by Headingley to the north and Woodhouse, Leeds to the South.

The Ridge has a number of interesting features, including a Victorian bandstand, a world war two air raid shelter, a packhorse bridge, the Meanwood Beck and allotments, all connected by a network of public footpaths.

== History ==
The Ridge is one of the few remaining woodland areas of the ancient manor of Leeds. The area was set aside for leisure activities from at least 1846, when it was partly quarried open moorland with a network of paths. This network of paths and a bandstand is visible in photographs from the early twentieth century, at which time the area was much more open than it is today, with areas of moorland and views across the undeveloped valley to Farm Hill and Sugar Well Hill.

The public area was expanded in 1901 with the addition of Batty's Wood, an area of oak and ash woodland that is shown on John Tuke's 1781 map of common land in Leeds district as "Battye Wood", located on steeply sloping land above Meanwood Beck, its western flank marked by a footpath to the bridge crossing to former Bentley Common. Battye or Batty's Wood was a gift from Alderman John Warburton to the City of Leeds.

In 1974, the abandoned mill buildings and silted millpond abutting the Meanwood Beck, which were believed to have dated from at least 1610, were acquired by the City Council, demolished and the site planted with trees and a grassy glade and added to The Ridge's parkland.

The nickname 'The Ridge' is captured in the names of three local streets: Ridge Road, which runs from Meanwood Road up to The Ridge's southern entrance, Ridge Grove, a short residential street off Meanwood Road backing on to the woodland, and Ridge Terrace, which leads to the northern Headingley entrance, from Wood Lane.

== Dales Way and Meanwood Valley Trail ==
The Ridge forms a part of the Leeds link connection to the Dales Way, and allows walkers to travel almost entirely in woods and parkland for the entire distance from close to the city centre of Leeds through to Ilkley then through the Yorkshire dales to Bowness in Windermere, or for the less ambitious, the Meanwood Valley Trail as far as Golden Acre park in Bramhope.

== Management ==
Woodhouse Ridge is designated as a Local Nature Area by Leeds City Council and is the responsibility of its Parks and Countryside Service. A community group, Woodhouse Ridge Action Group (WRAG) was established in 1995 to act as a pressure group and "critical friend" and organises regular Action Days where local residents, augmented during term time by members of the University of Leeds' Conservation Volunteers, undertake conservation and maintenance tasks.
