= Meanwood Valley Urban Farm =

Coordinates: 53°49′14.9″N 1°33′11.8″W

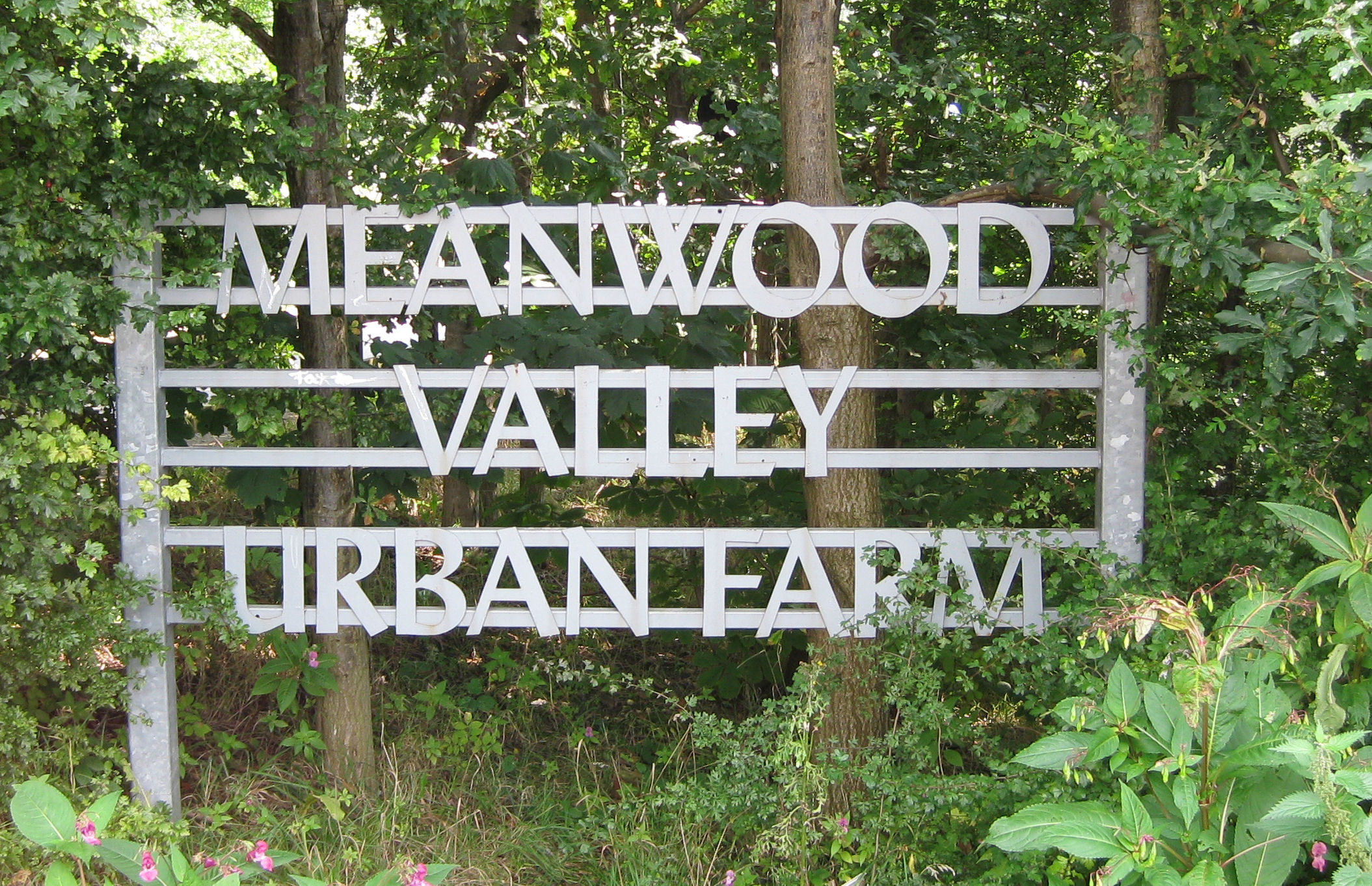
Entrance sign to the farm.

Meanwood Valley Urban Farm is a city farm established in 1980 in Meanwood, Leeds, England, which has animals and crops and an environmentally friendly visitors centre. The farm is on Meanwood Beck and occupies 24 acres (97,000 m^{2}). The main entrance is on Sugarwell Road.

== Activities ==
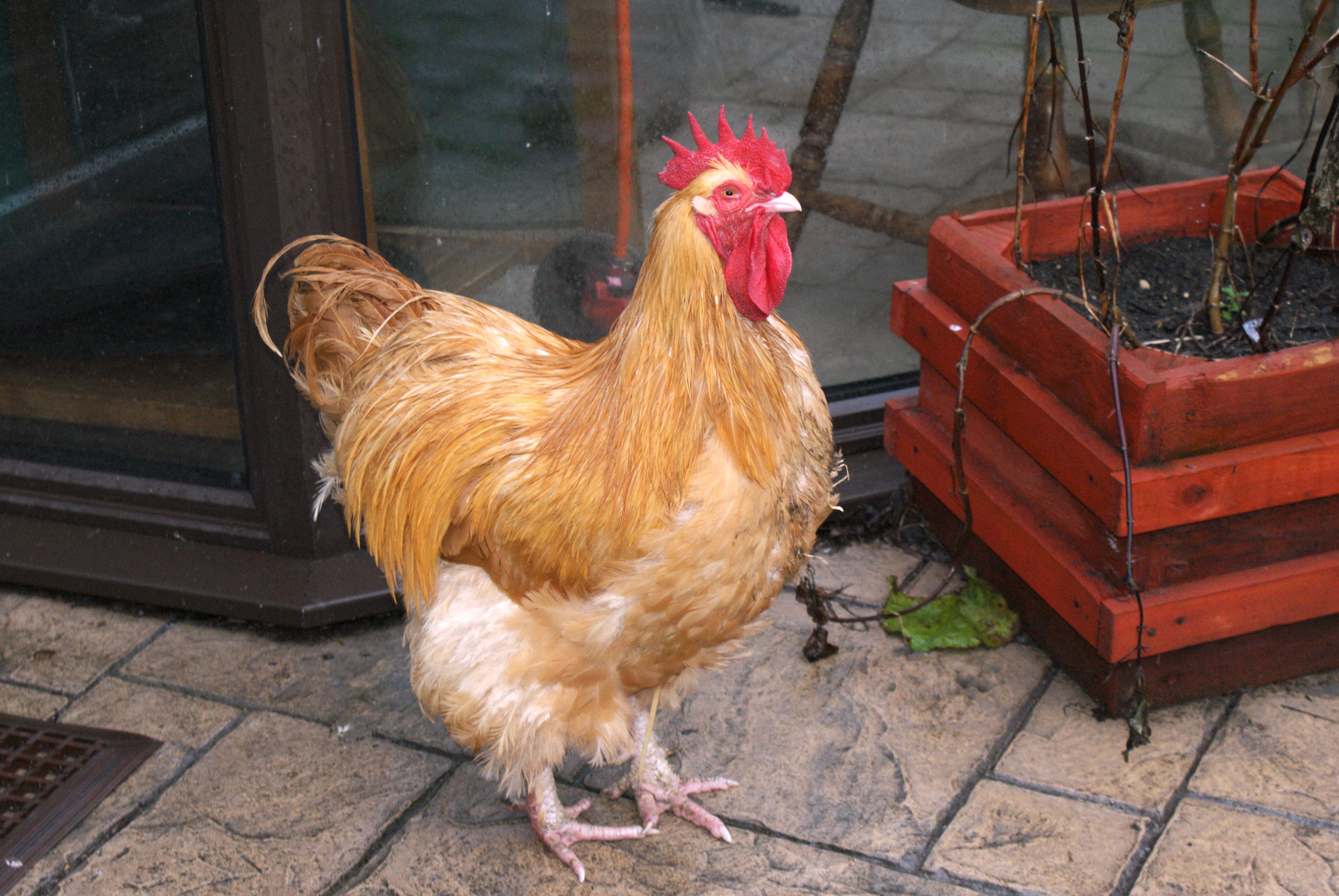
Chicken

It demonstrates a variety of wildlife habitats, organic farming and sustainability over 24 acres (97,000 m^{2}) to members of the public, and introduces schoolchildren to various aspects of farming and the environment. The Farm also provides educational services to disadvantaged young people and adults with learning difficulties. It provides locally grown food and allotments for the community. There is a social enterprise coffee shop where profits go to the community, and which provides a meeting place for local communities and work experience and training.

The animals farmed include Dexter cattle, sheep (Whitefaced Woodland Ryeland), alpacas, goats, several breeds of pig, chickens and ducks. There are also guinea pigs and rabbits in the small animals area and two donkeys. Honey is produced from beehives kept on the farm and the moors.

A Recycled Bike Project takes cycles from Meanwood Household Waste Site and donated by West Yorkshire Police, which are rebuilt by young people, teaching them mechanical skills. The final bicycles are then donated to trainees or unemployed people to aid commuting. Ten have been sent to Romania for Medicare Nurses to visit their patients.

== History ==
It was established in 1980 as a charity run by volunteers with £5,000 from Leeds City Council, initially with one caravan (later two) as the only accommodation, and was formally opened in July 1981 by the Lord Mayor of Leeds.

By 1986 there was a hut, and in 1999, having raised half a million pounds, a timber frame building called the Epicentre was opened as a resource for the farm and the local community, with offices, education and meeting rooms. Further fundraising produced donations of a similar sum to enable expansion, with new animal buildings in 2004.

== Epicentre ==
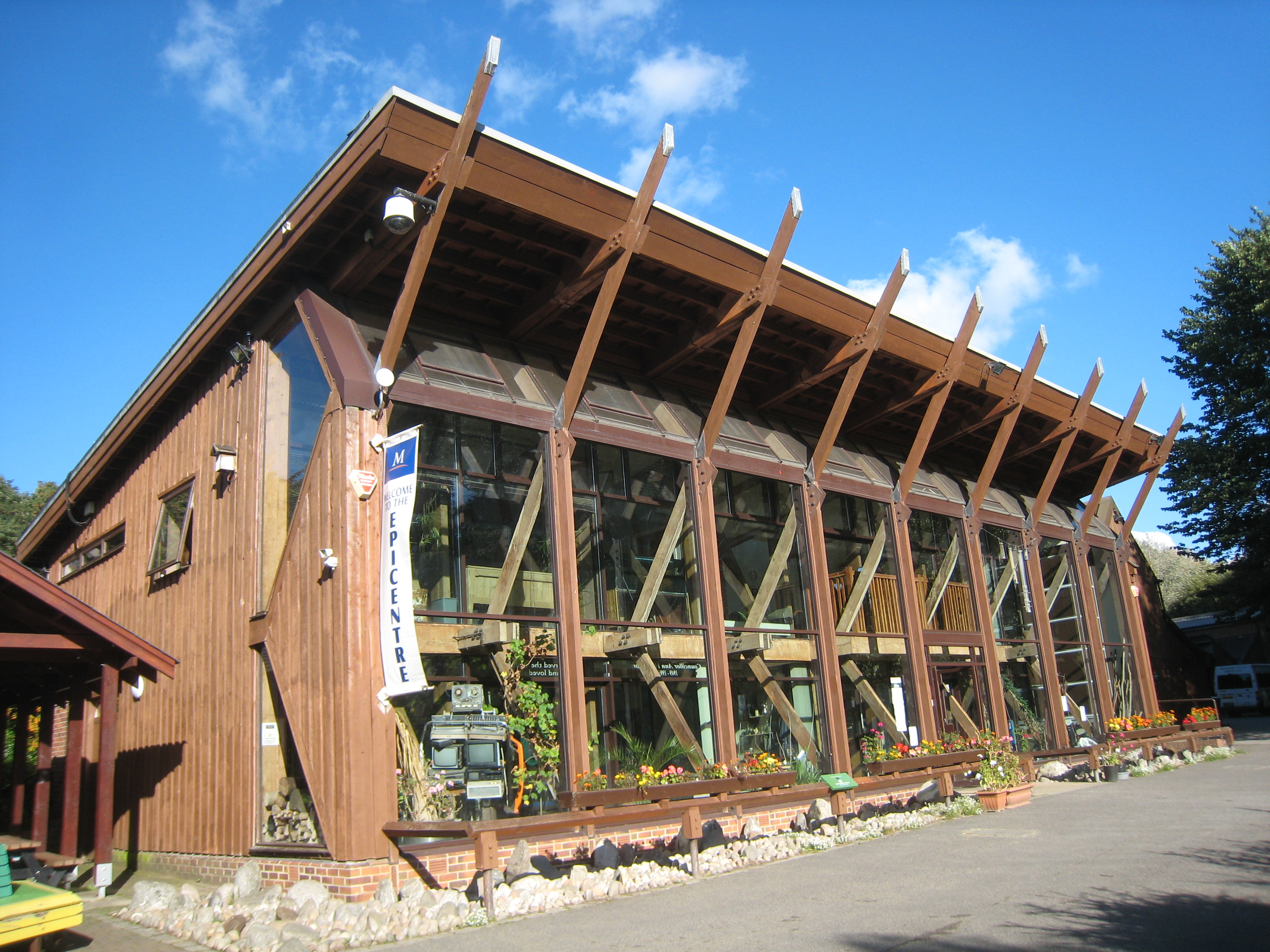
The Epicentre

The main building provides administrative rooms for the farm, and meeting rooms for local groups. It is an example of Walter Segal system of self-build construction which is environmentally-friendly in its use of materials and energy. It is a low-energy building using the principle of solar gain; it has a turf roof and uses a reed bed drainage treatment system. It was officially opened by the Environment Secretary, Michael Meacher and was also visited by Prince Charles in 2002.

== Recognition ==
It was commended by Prince Charles. Its Director, Sue Reddington, received an MBE for her work with the farm in the 2000 New Year Honours and one of its first volunteers, Robert Collins, received the same in the 2013 New Year Honours.

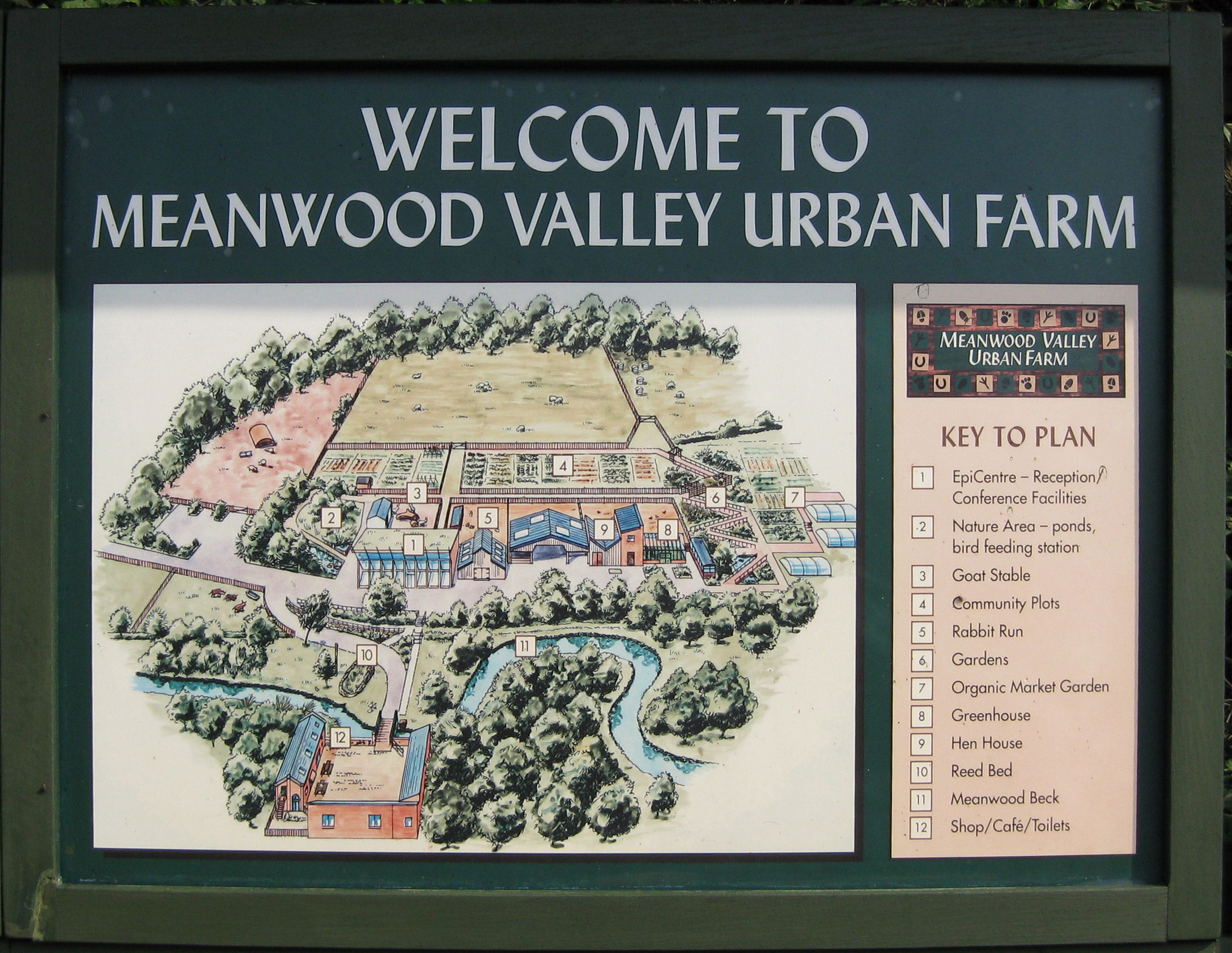
Map sign

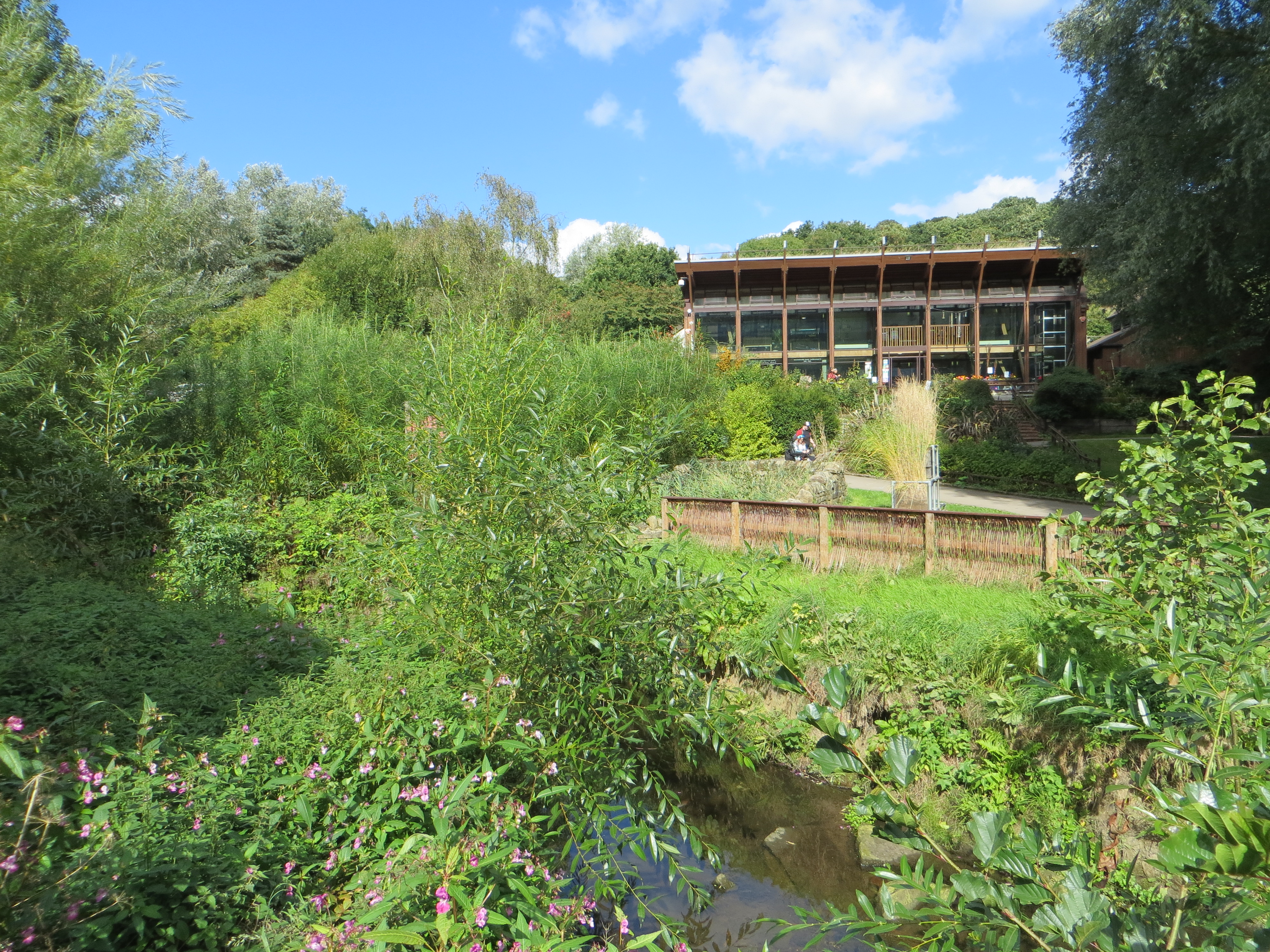
View across Meanwood Beck and then the reed beds towards the Epicentre

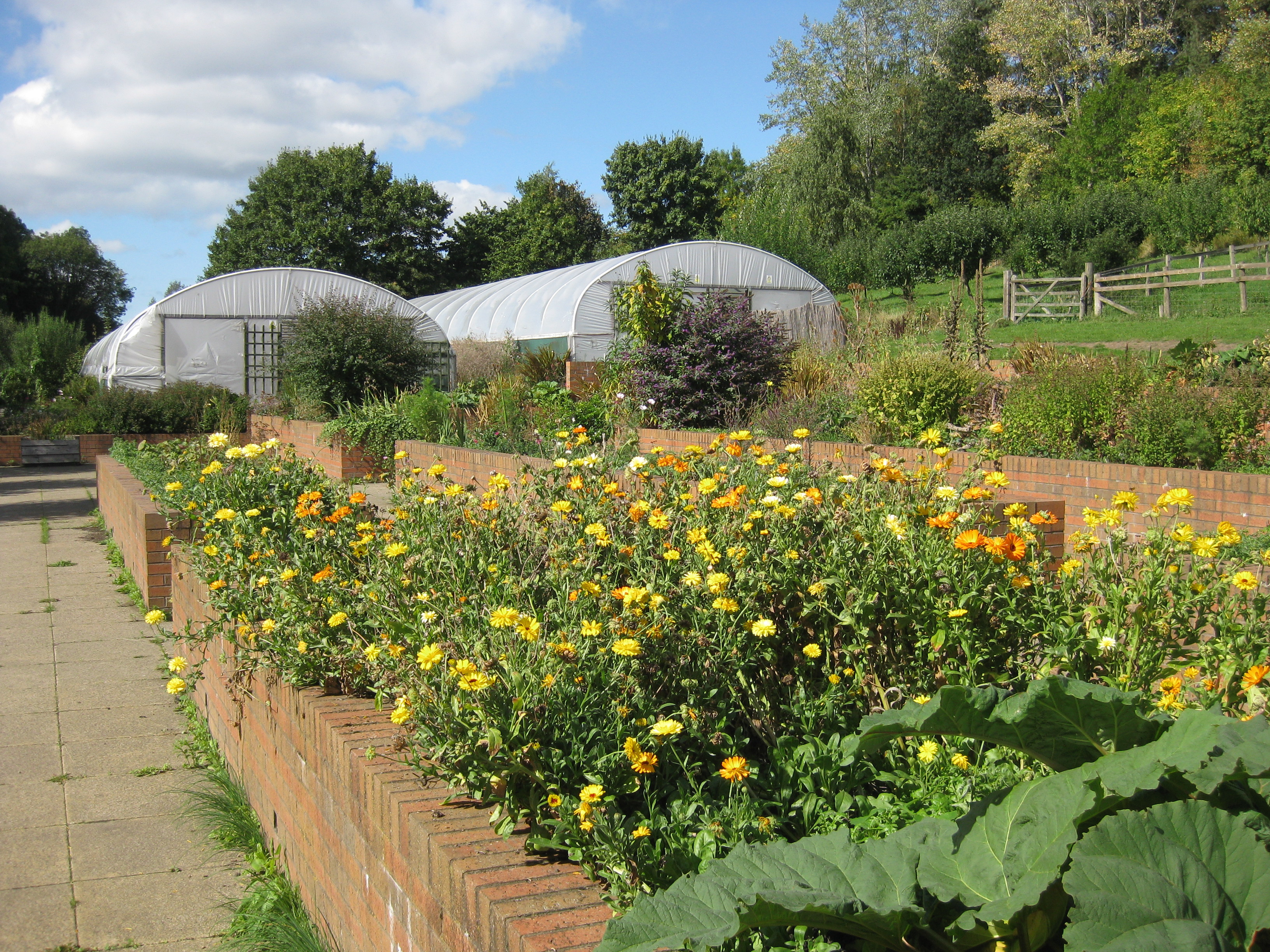
Raised flower beds and growing tunnels

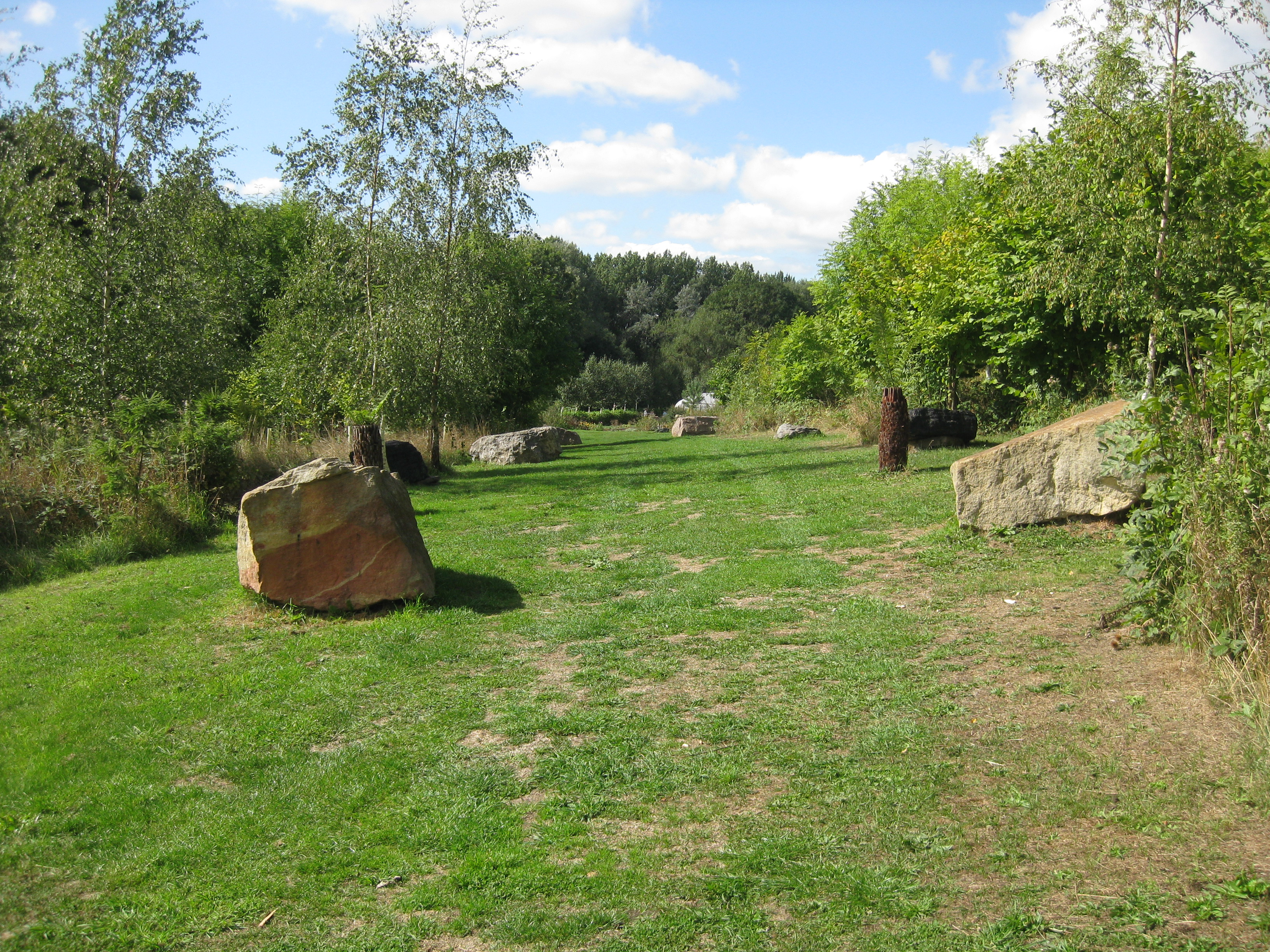
The Limestone Walk path

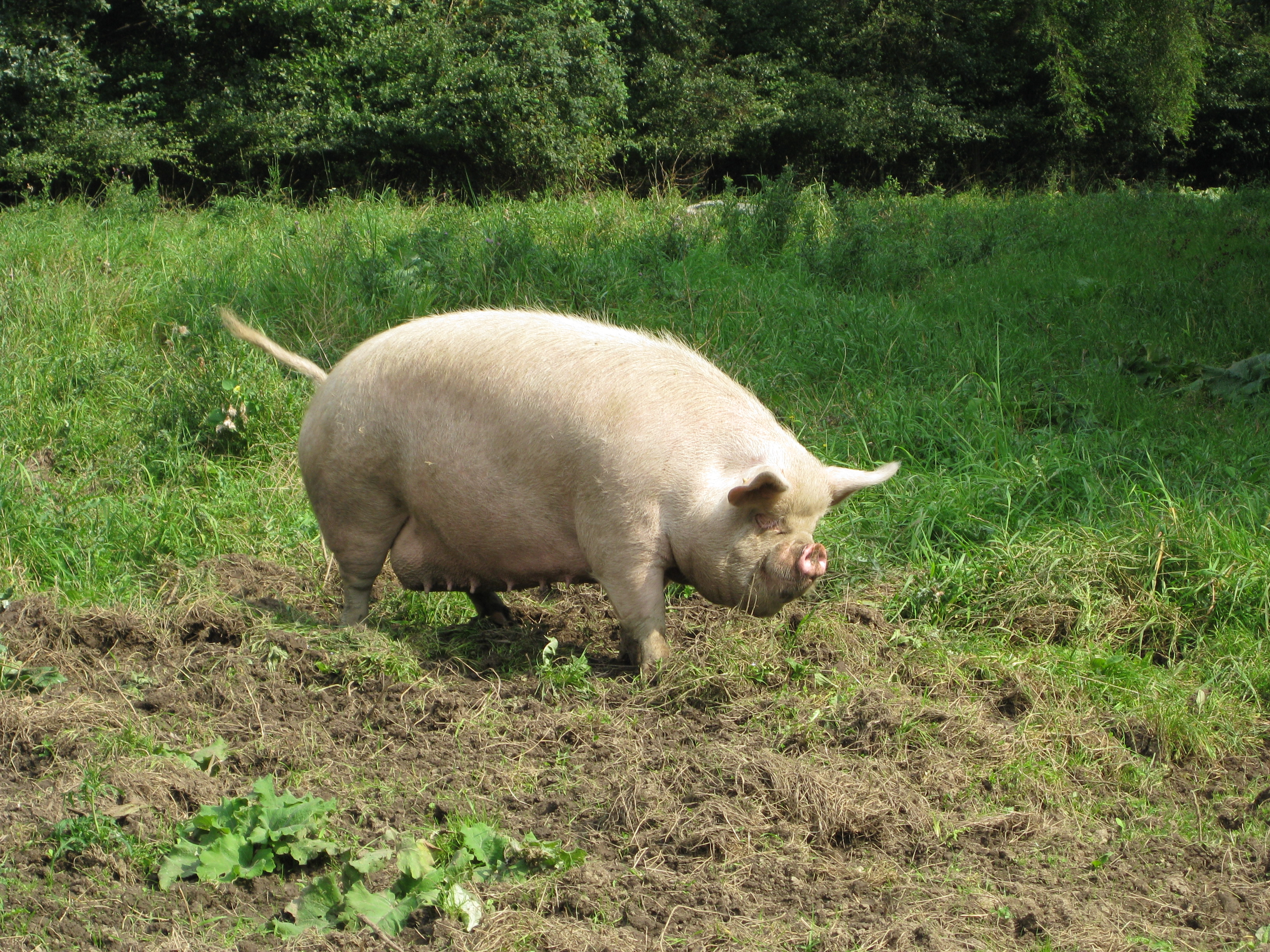
A pig

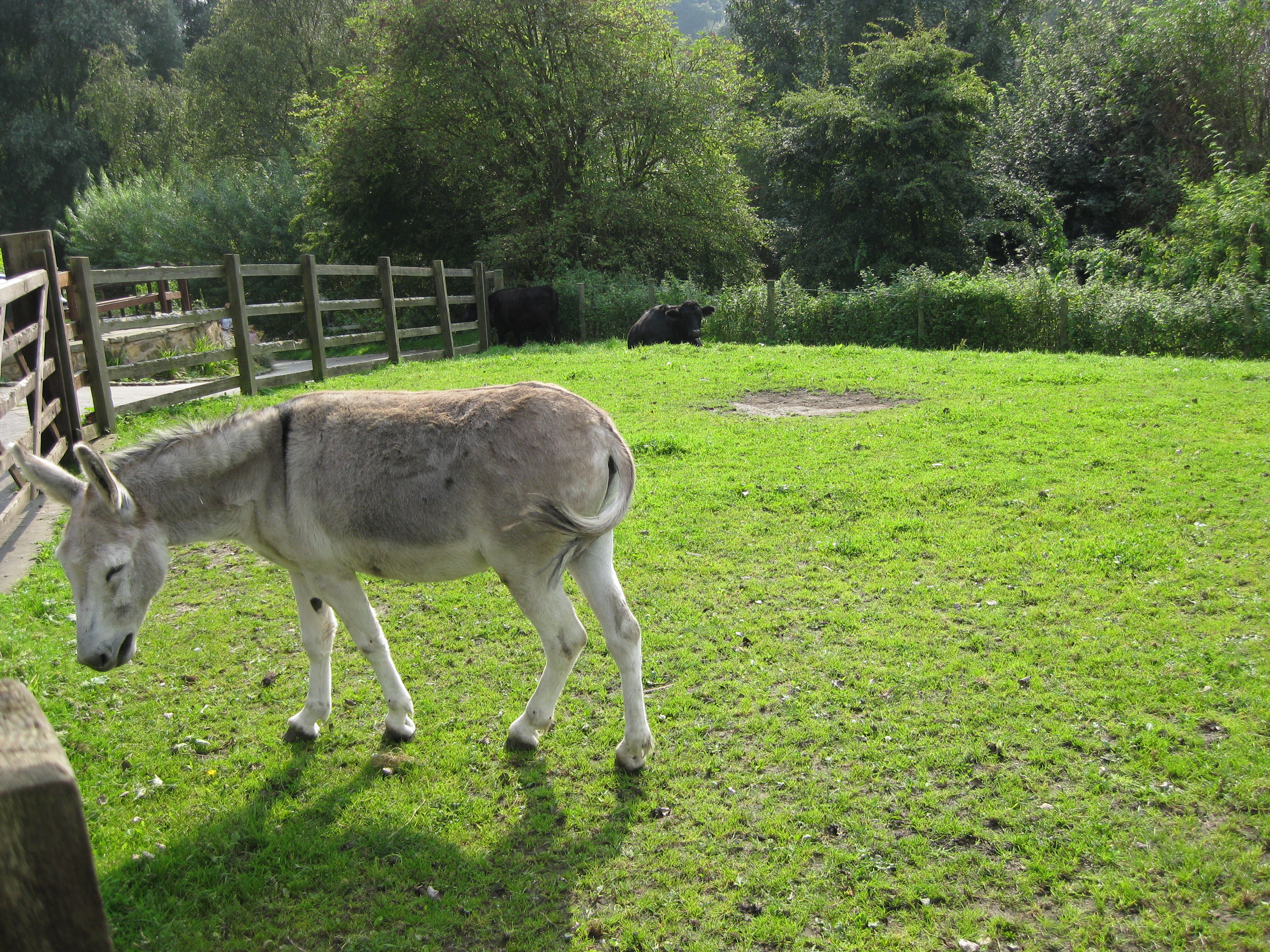
A donkey
