= Meanwood =

Suburb of Leeds in West Yorkshire, England

Coordinates: 53.8320°N 1.5642°W

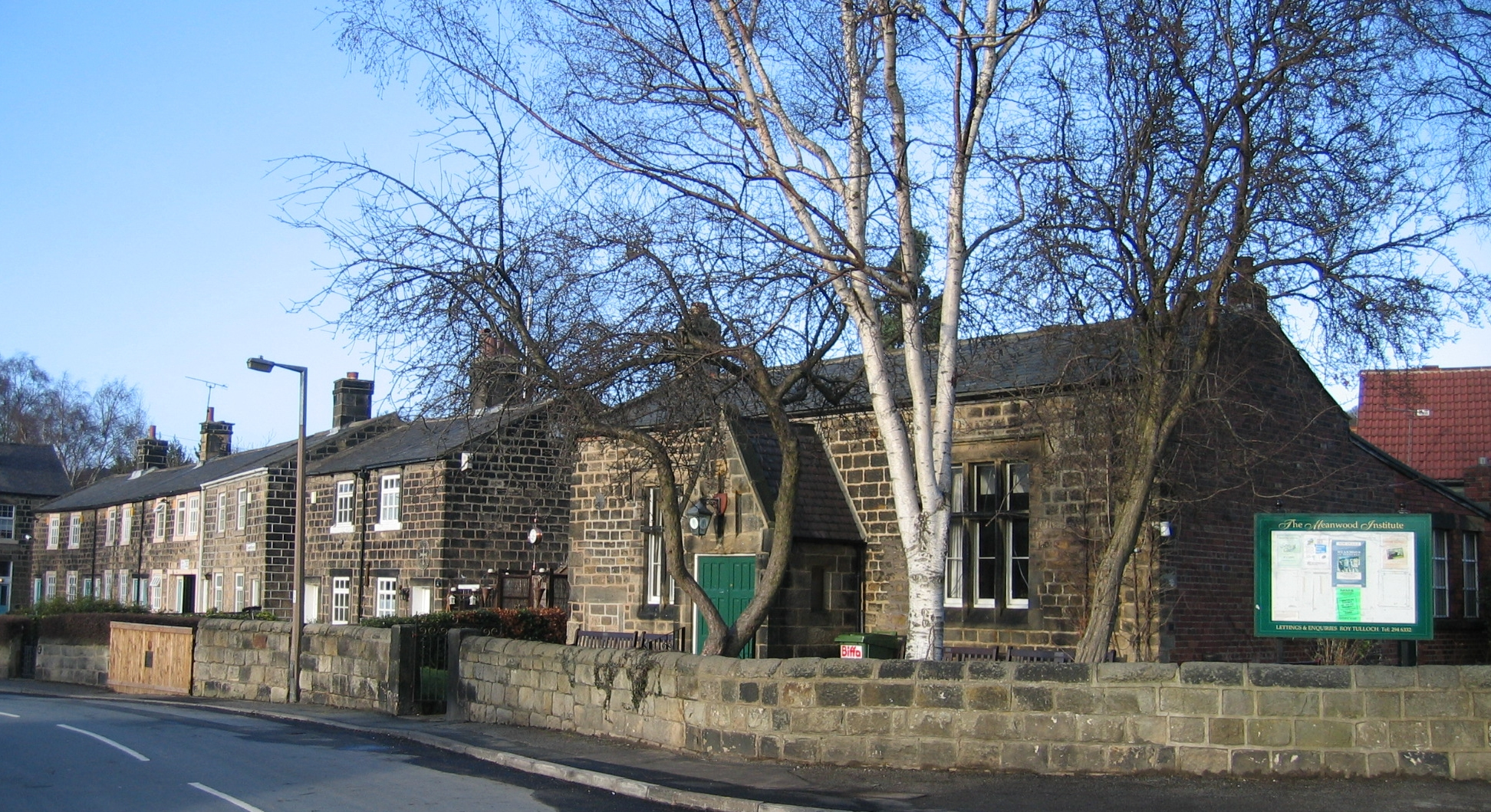
- Meanwood Institute and 19th century terraced houses

- Location within West Yorkshire
- Metropolitan borough: City of Leeds
- Metropolitan county: West Yorkshire
- Region: Yorkshire and the Humber
- Country: England
- Sovereign state: United Kingdom
- Post town: LEEDS
- Postcode district: LS6, LS7,
- Dialling code: 0113
- Police: West Yorkshire
- Fire: West Yorkshire
- Ambulance: Yorkshire
- UK Parliament: Leeds North East

Meanwood is a suburb and former village in north-west Leeds, West Yorkshire, England.

The area sits in the Moortown ward of Leeds City Council and Leeds North East parliamentary constituency.

== Origins and history ==
The name Meanwood goes back to the 12th century, and is of Anglo-Saxon derivation: the Meene wude was the boundary wood of the Manor of Alreton, the woods to the east of Meanwood Beck. Dwellings and farms near the wood were known by a variety of names including Meanwoodside until 27 August 1847 when the parish of Meanwood was established and the woods became known Meanwood Woods.

A skirmish, between Royalist and Parliamentarian forces, took place in Meanwood, during the Civil War. It is said that the "beck ran red", with the blood of the fallen, hence, the place name "Stainbeck".

The Meanwood Valley was a place of industry as long ago as 1577 and it continued to the 19th century. The Meanwood Beck provided water and power for corn, flax and paper mills, dye works and tanneries. There were numerous quarries.

In 1830 a turnpike road was established through the Meanwood Valley to Leeds. Public transport followed from 1850 and electric trams in 1890, meaning that it was practical for people to travel to work from greater distances, encouraging both industrial buildings and housing.

== Public open space ==
=== Meanwood Park ===
Meanwood Park, in the north of the area, is approximately 29 hectares (72 acres), and has large open areas and mature trees. Meanwood Beck runs through it, crossed by many small footbridges. The southern end has a children's playground and an area with picnic tables. To the north west Meanwood Park borders onto the Hollies, a separate park with sloping woodland containing many rhododendrons and azaleas. The Hollies has gardens including the National Plant Collection of Philadelphus. The Meanwood Valley Trail passes through Meanwood Park. It is believed that the artist John Atkinson Grimshaw based some of his fairy paintings in Meanwood Park.

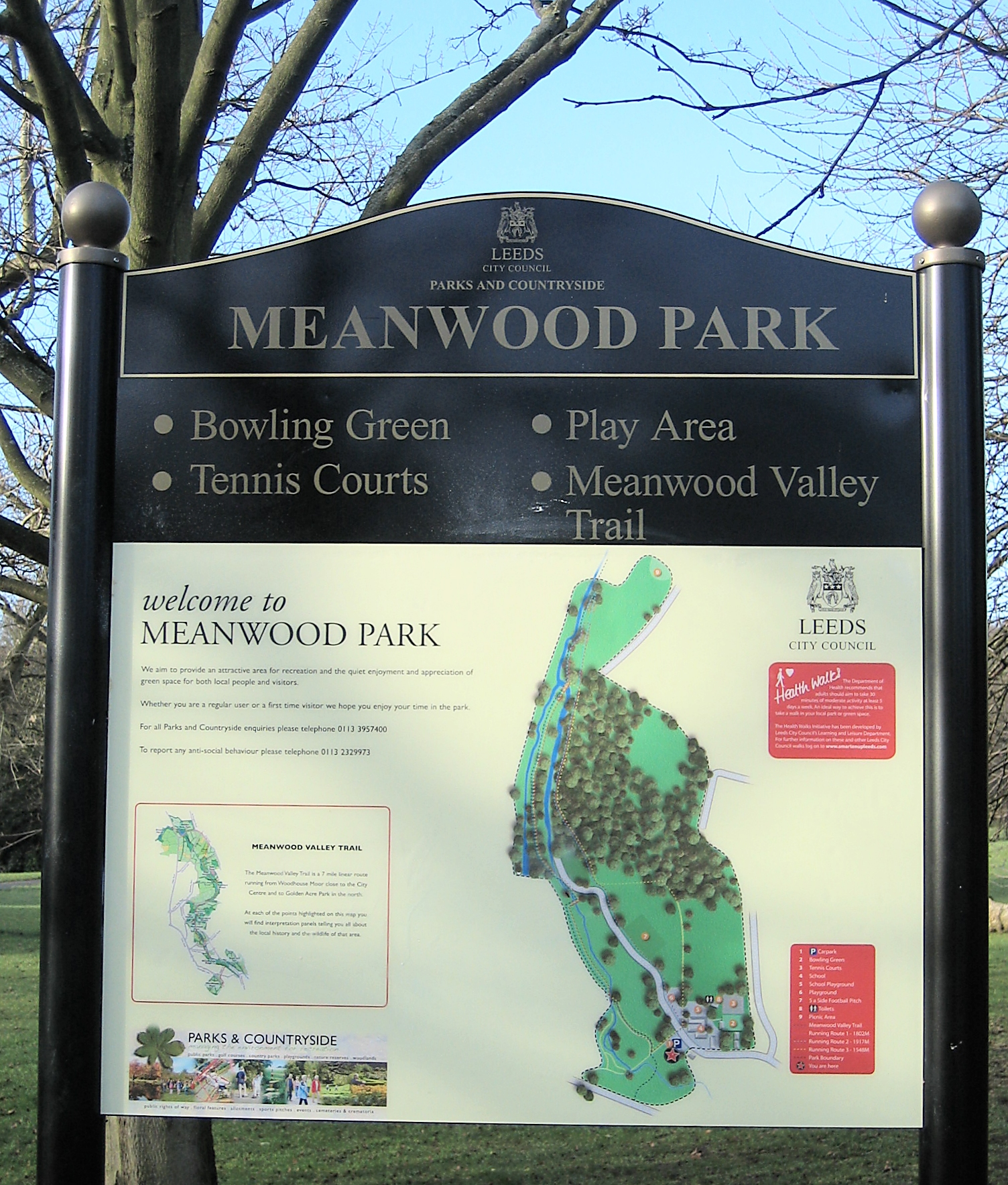
Map sign for Meanwood Park and Meanwood Valley Trail

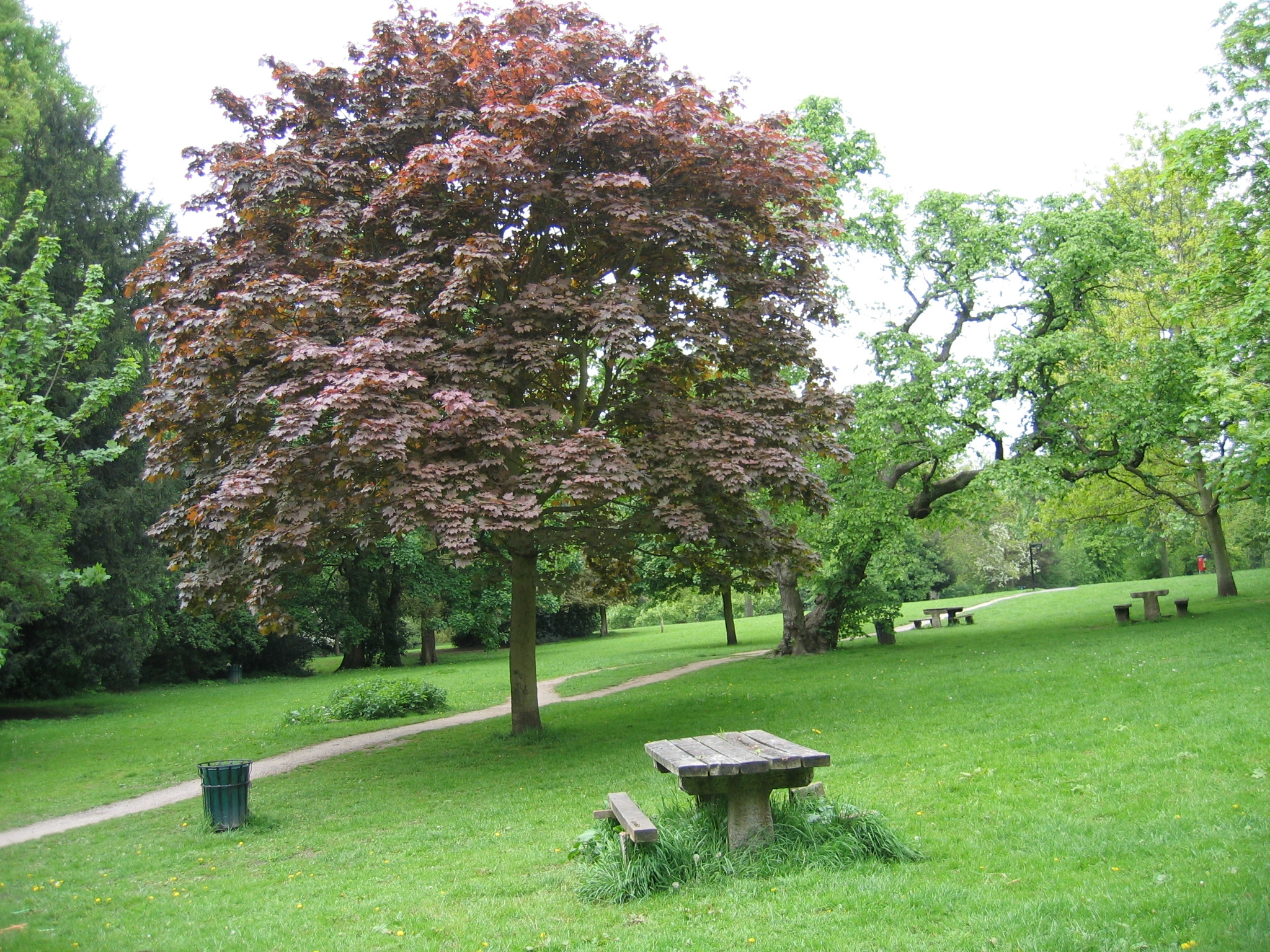
Picnic area in Meanwood Park

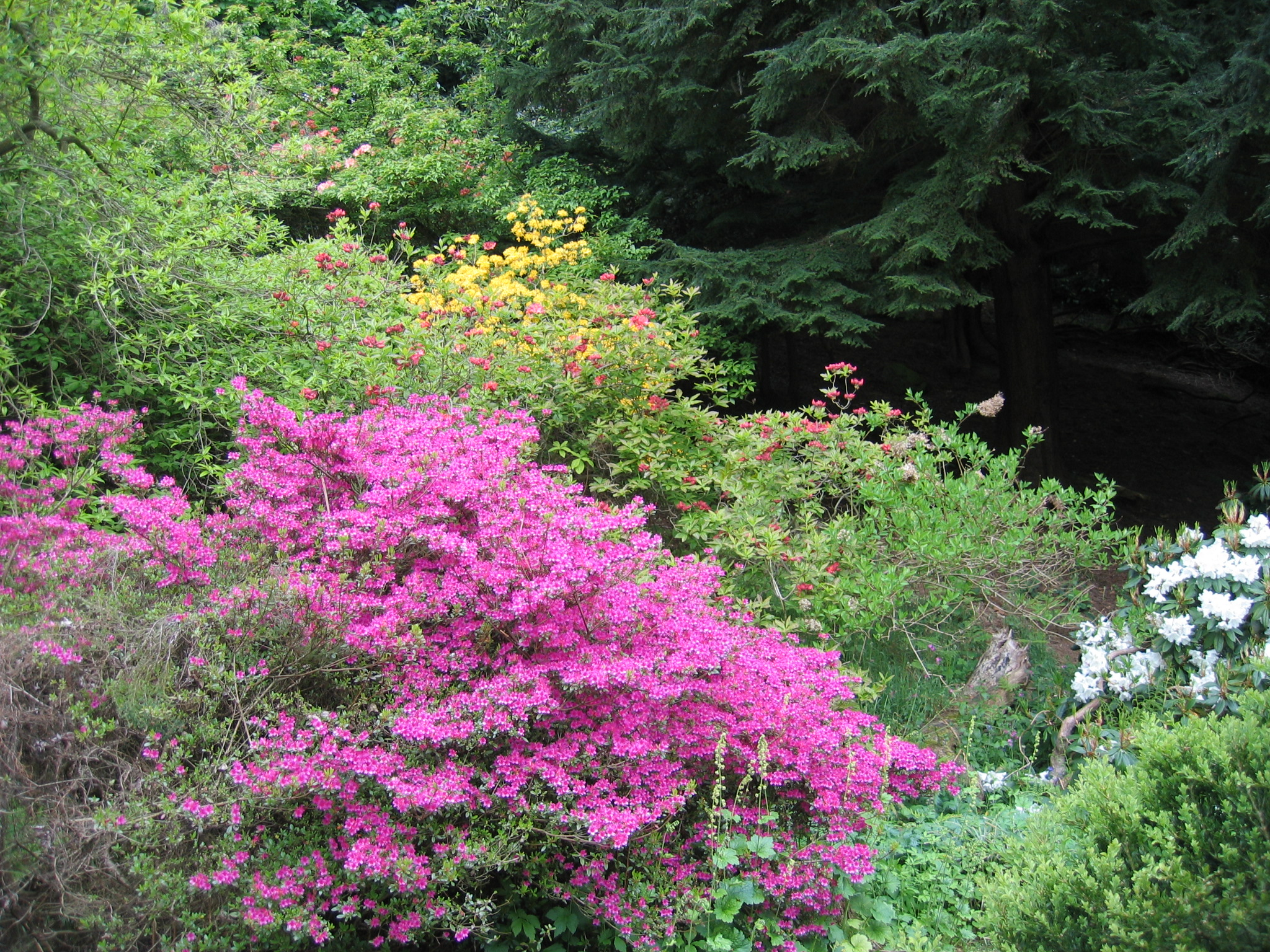
Part of the Hollies

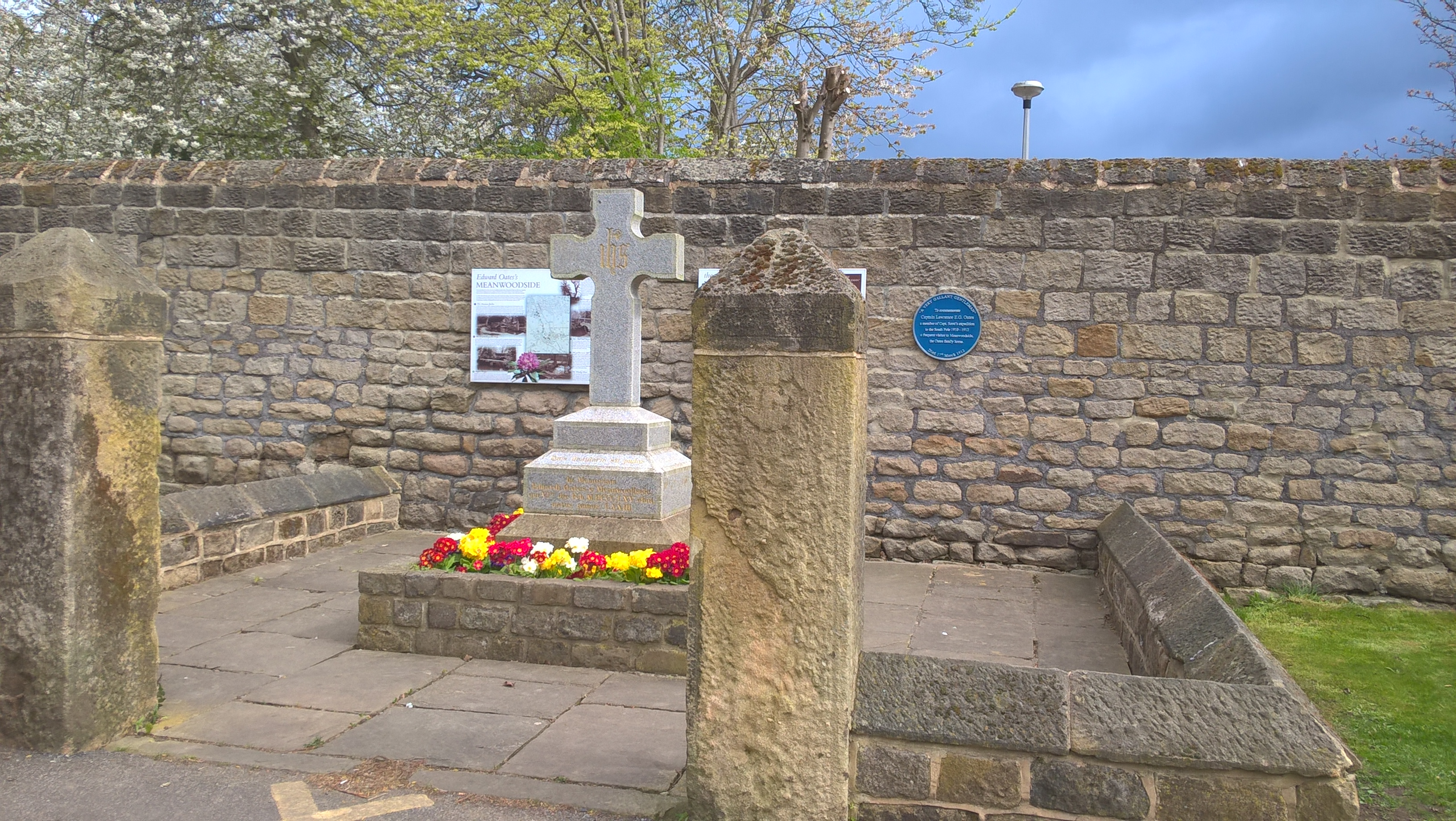
Lawrence Oates Memorial

=== Tunnel How Hill ===
Tunnel How Hill, north of Stonegate Road, "was reputed to be the highest point in Leeds". A folly in the form of a ruined castle stood there from the 18th century until 1946, dedicated to King Alfred. Some streets adjacent to the hill are named after King Alfred.

The hill was formerly known as Pen-how-fyn, and a hamlet below it was Paenfynaen (where fynaen means settlement). It was referred to as Penny Fun in the 19th century and several houses in the vicinity used the name. The 1850 Ordnance Survey Map labels the settlement as Pen-y-ffynon. A public house in the Moor Allerton District Centre was called the Penny Fun until 2020, when it was renamed.

== Significant buildings ==
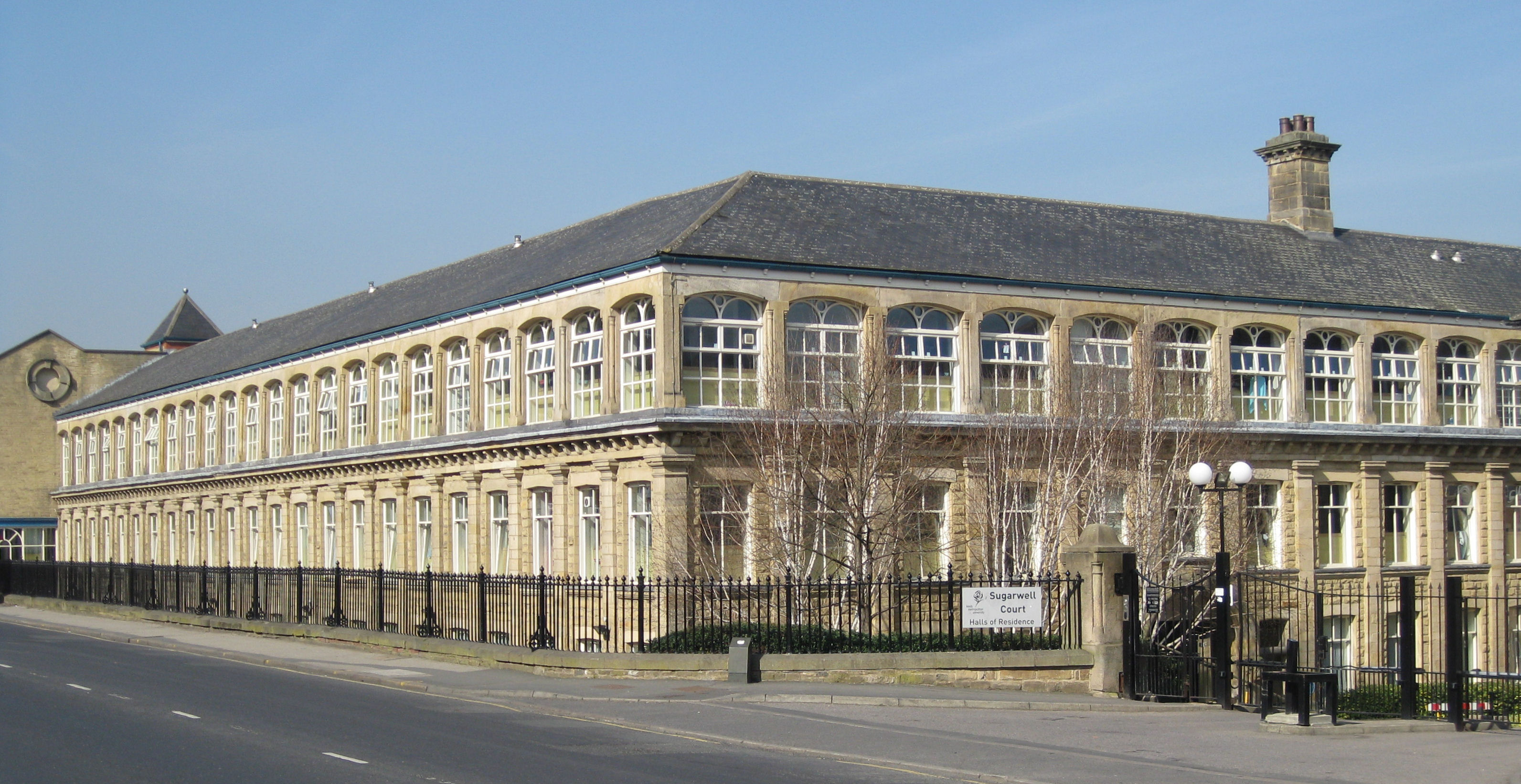
Sugarwell Court

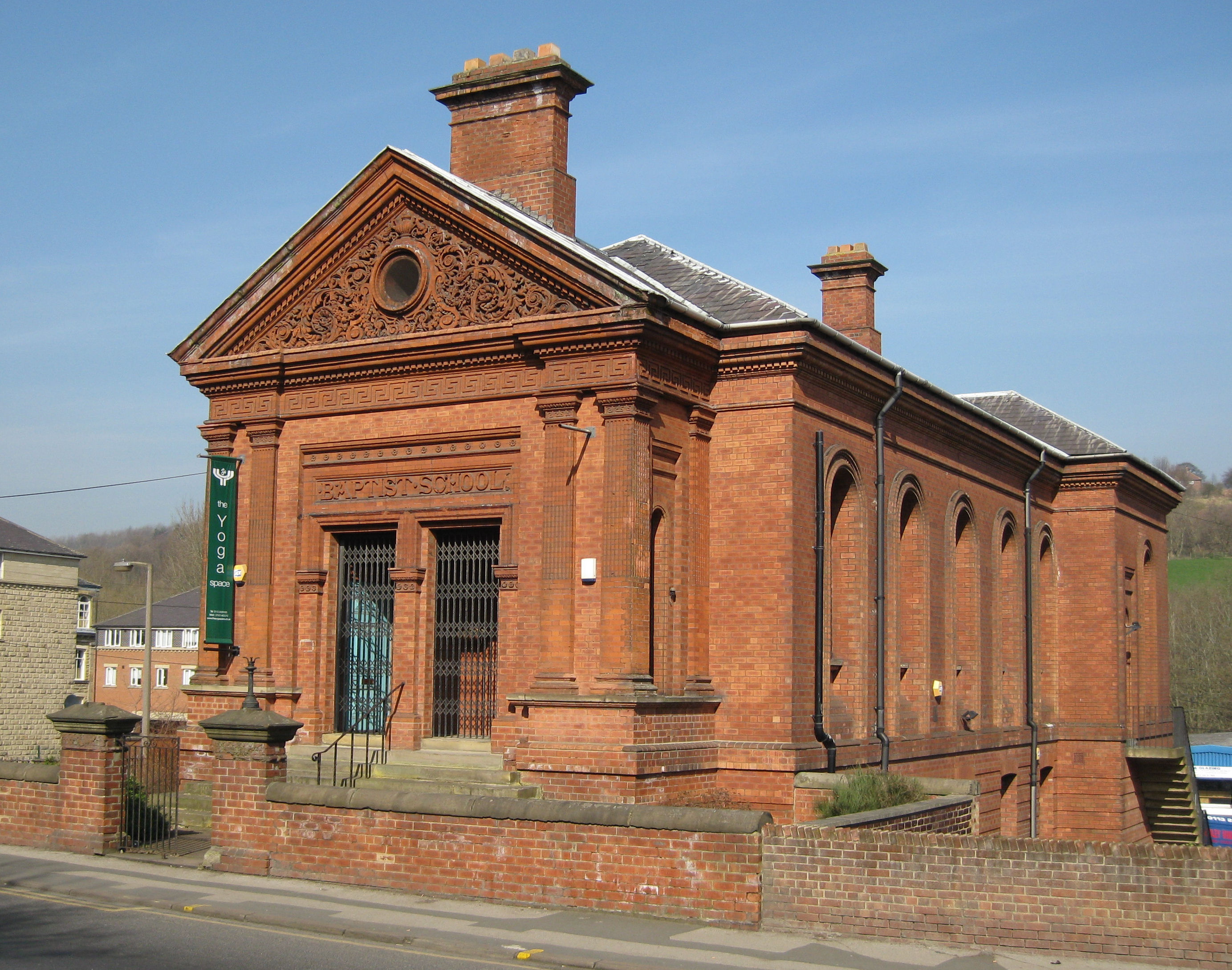
Former Baptist School

The 1841 census listed 144 houses, including Carr House (Carr Manor), Meanwood Hall and Whalley House (now demolished). Most properties were stone cottages, now gone, with the exception of a few houses on Monkbridge Road. Hustler's Row remains as a group of 1850 stone cottages named after John Husler, a quarry owner. To the west along the road towards Meanwood Park are some houses built for tannery workers and the Meanwood Institute, built about 1820, but opened as the Institute in 1885, a Grade II listed building.

Sugarwell Court on Meanwood Road, is the former Cliff Tannery, an 1866 Grade II listed building converted into a university hall of residence. Nearby is a former Baptist school, a brick Grade II listed building dating from about 1886.

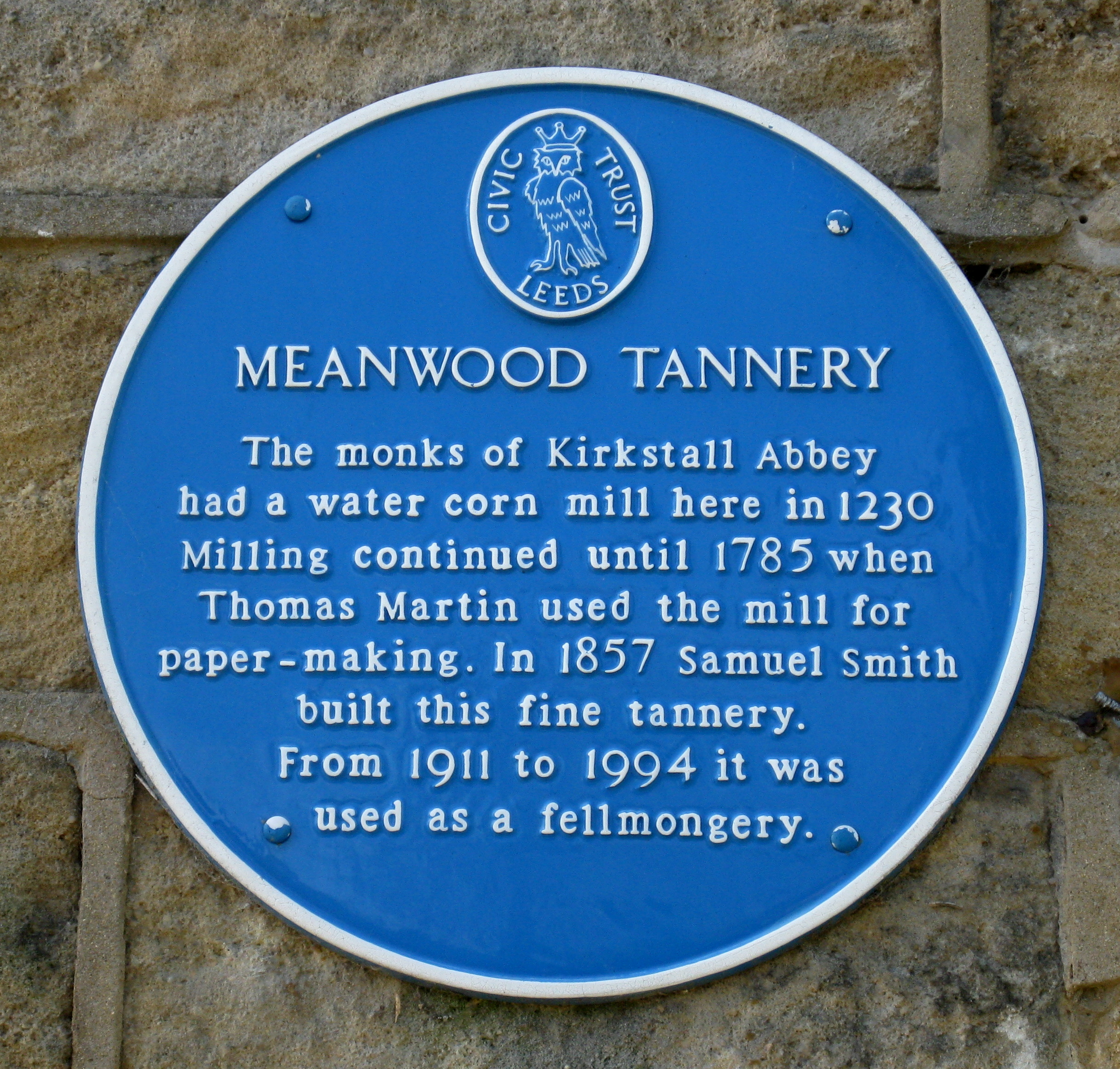
Meanwood Tannery blue plaque

There are a number of 19th-century industrial buildings in Meanwood Valley along the Meanwood Beck, and 19th century terraced housing on the valley side leading to Headingley, Weetwood and Woodhouse, along with an area of woodland known locally as the Ridge.

New estates have been built with grand, suburban housing: the Woodleas, the Stonegates and the Bowoods. 20th century council housing mixed with open space forms the opposite side of the valley leading up to Scott Hall. There is a shopping centre opposite a Waitrose Food & Home store on Green Road, near the site of a tannery which is believed to date from 1700.

=== Meanwood Hall ===
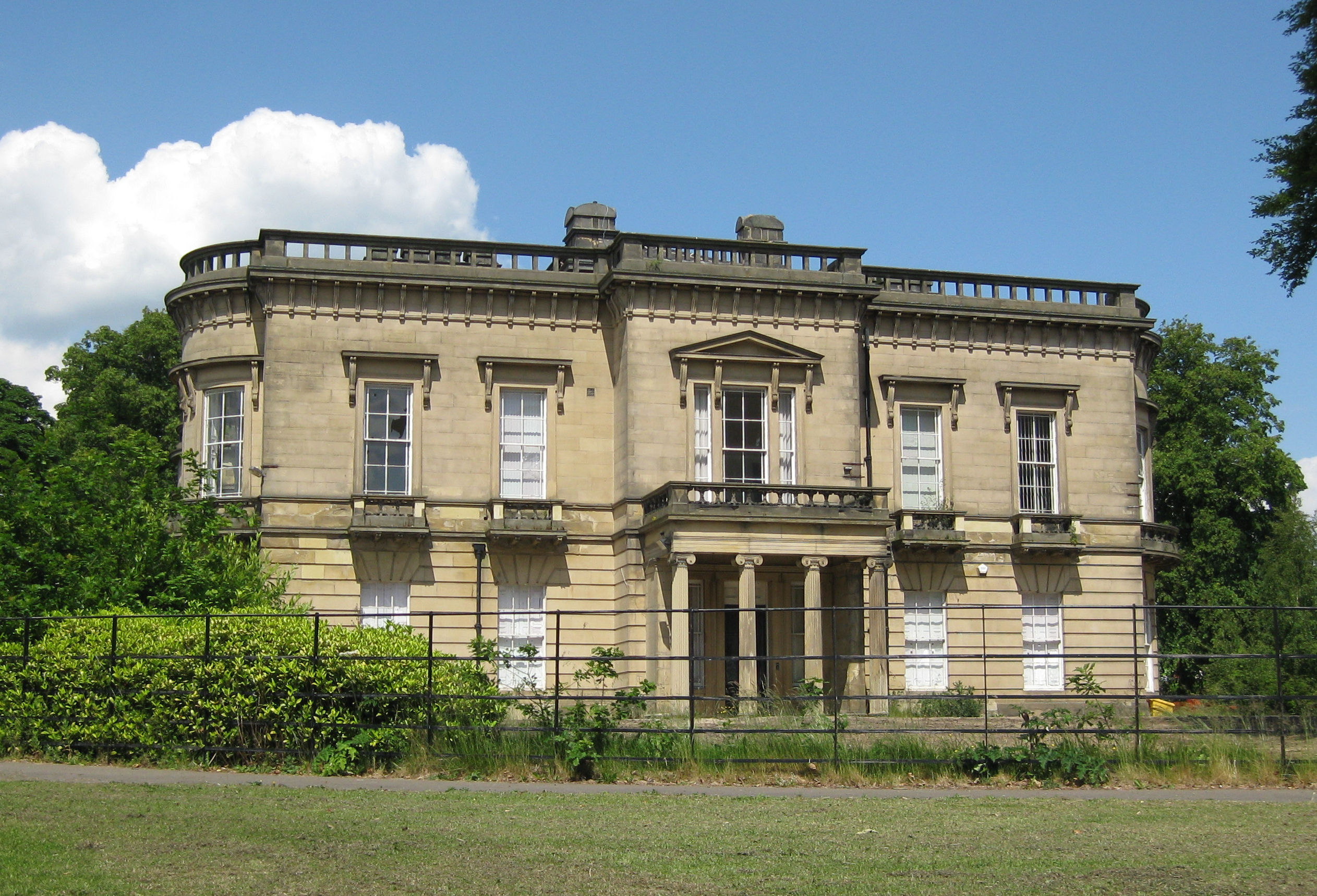
Meanwood Hall

Meanwood Hall is a grade II listed building. It was built about 1762 for Thomas Denison, extended in 1814 for Joseph Lees, and further developed in 1834 for Christopher Beckett. In 1919 it was bought by the city council to form the nucleus of Meanwood Park Hospital which accommodated men, women and children with learning disabilities. It served the city of Leeds and other areas of the West Riding of Yorkshire, and at its maximum extent in the 1960s had 841 beds. After the hospital closed in 1997, the hall was converted to housing, and further housing developments now fill the hospital grounds.

=== Meanwood Towers ===
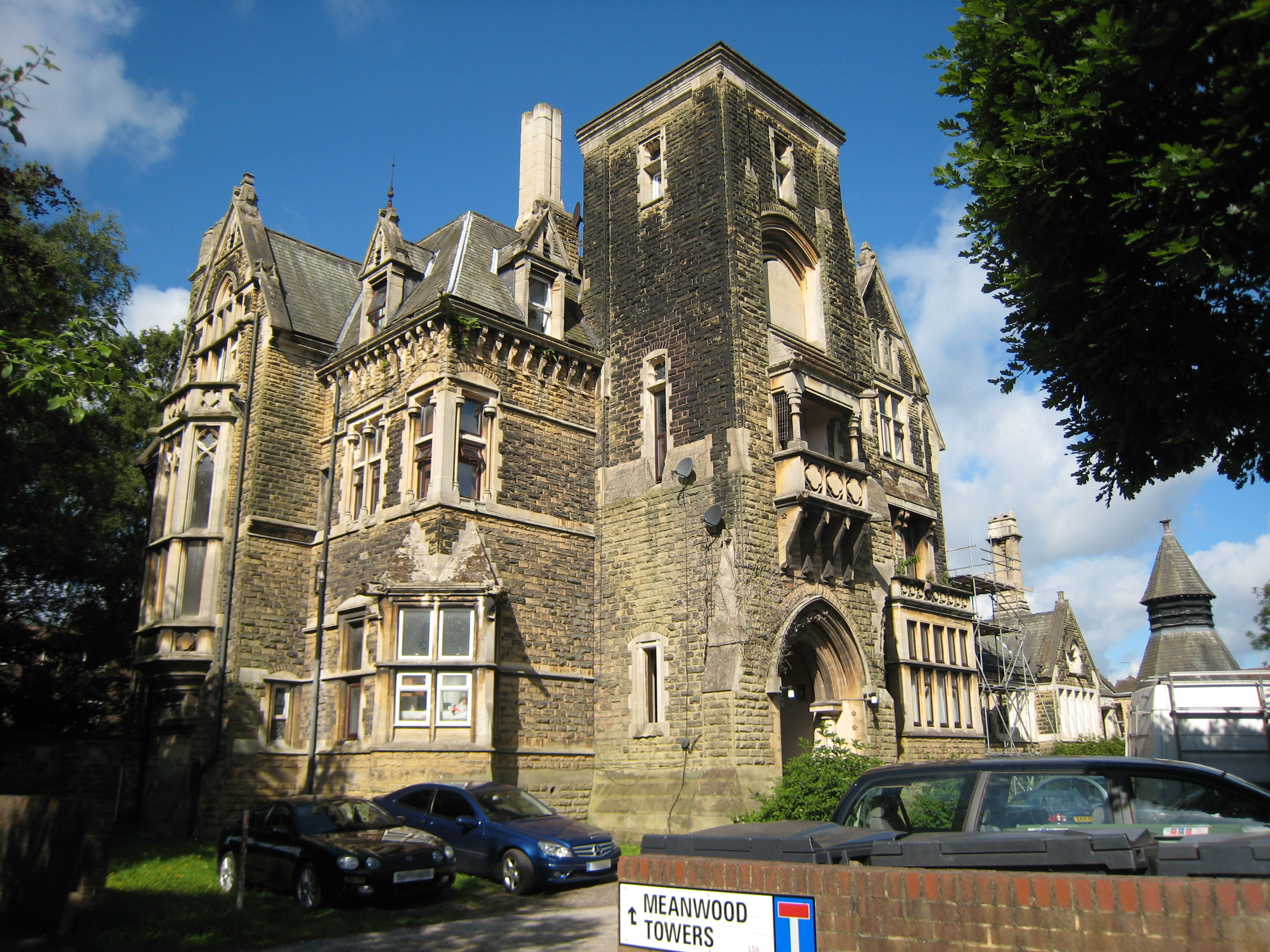
Meanwood Towers, in 2017

In the middle of an estate of inter-war semi-detached houses behind Stonegate Road stands a Victorian Gothic house, Meanwood Towers. Designed by Edward Welby Pugin, and built in 1866–67. A private house, it was commissioned by Thomas Stuart Kennedy and was originally called Meanwood House. Kennedy commissioned the German organ-builder Edmund Schulze to build him a pipe organ. In 1869, it was installed in a specially-built 800-seat wooden concert hall or 'organ house'. After eight years, there were problems with the organ house and the Schulze organ was loaned to St. Peter's Church, Harrogate and two years later, in 1879, it was sold and presented to St. Bartholomew's Church, Armley. In keeping with its grand design, the house was built with tall chimneys, but in 1969 these were shortened for safety reasons. Most of the original house survives, but converted into flats.

=== Carr Manor ===
Carr Manor was a 17th-century manor house sometimes known as Carr House. It was greatly extended 1880–81 by architect Edward Schroeder Prior for Thomas Clifford Allbutt. It was used by the City of Leeds as a residence for judges during trials at Leeds Crown Court, but is now private dwellings. Carr Manor gives its name to a 1950s estate of private houses and a primary and high school.

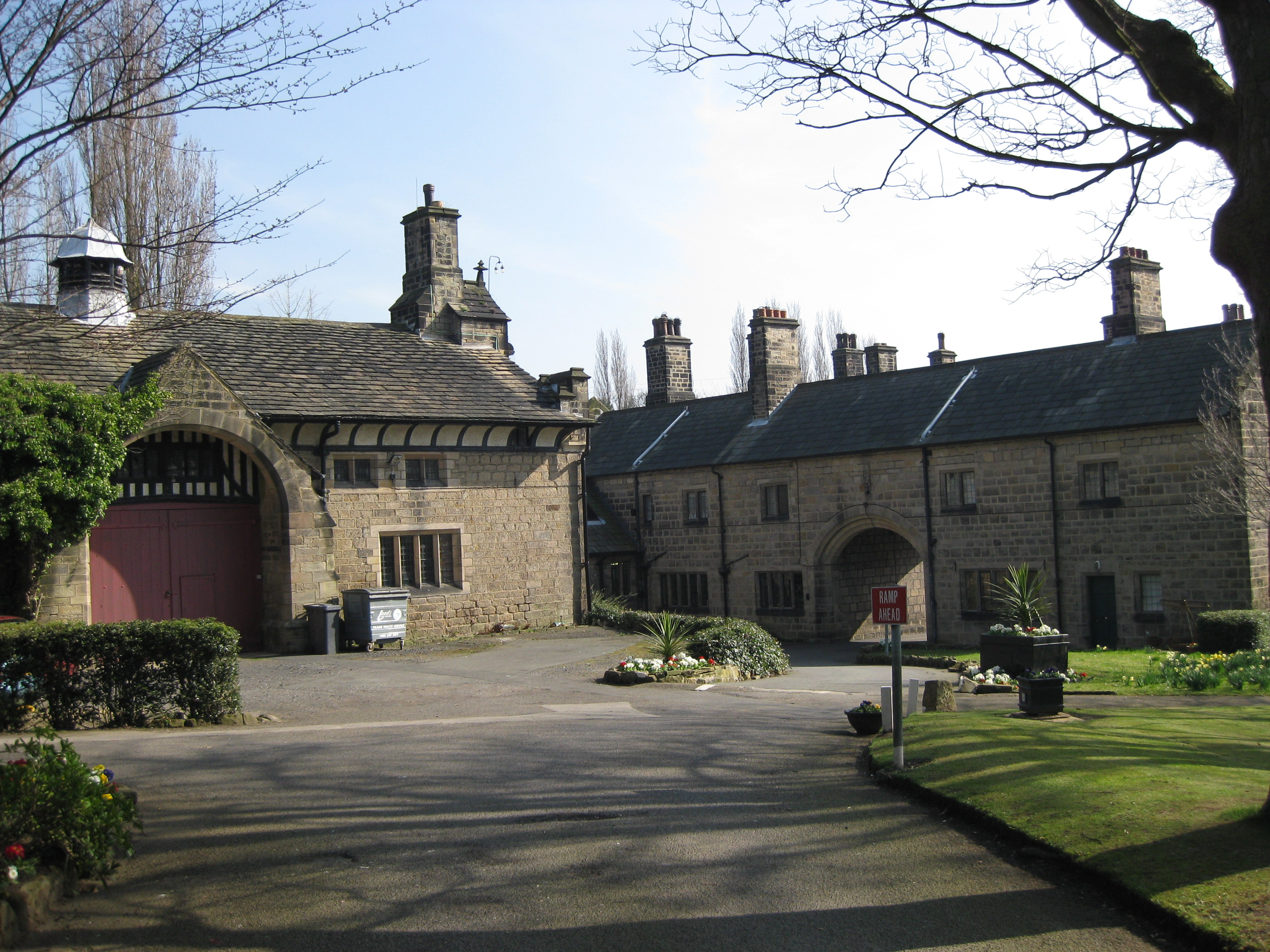
Carr Manor House

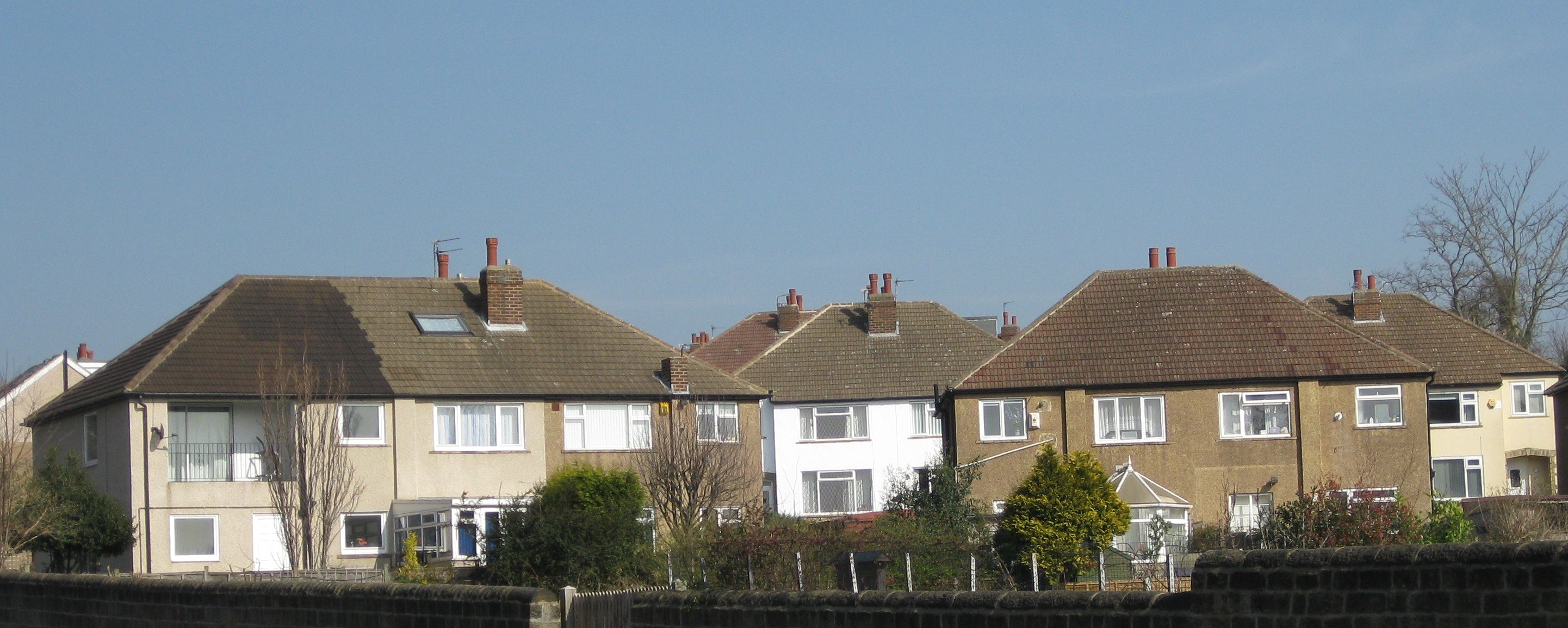
Carr Manor estate 1950s private houses

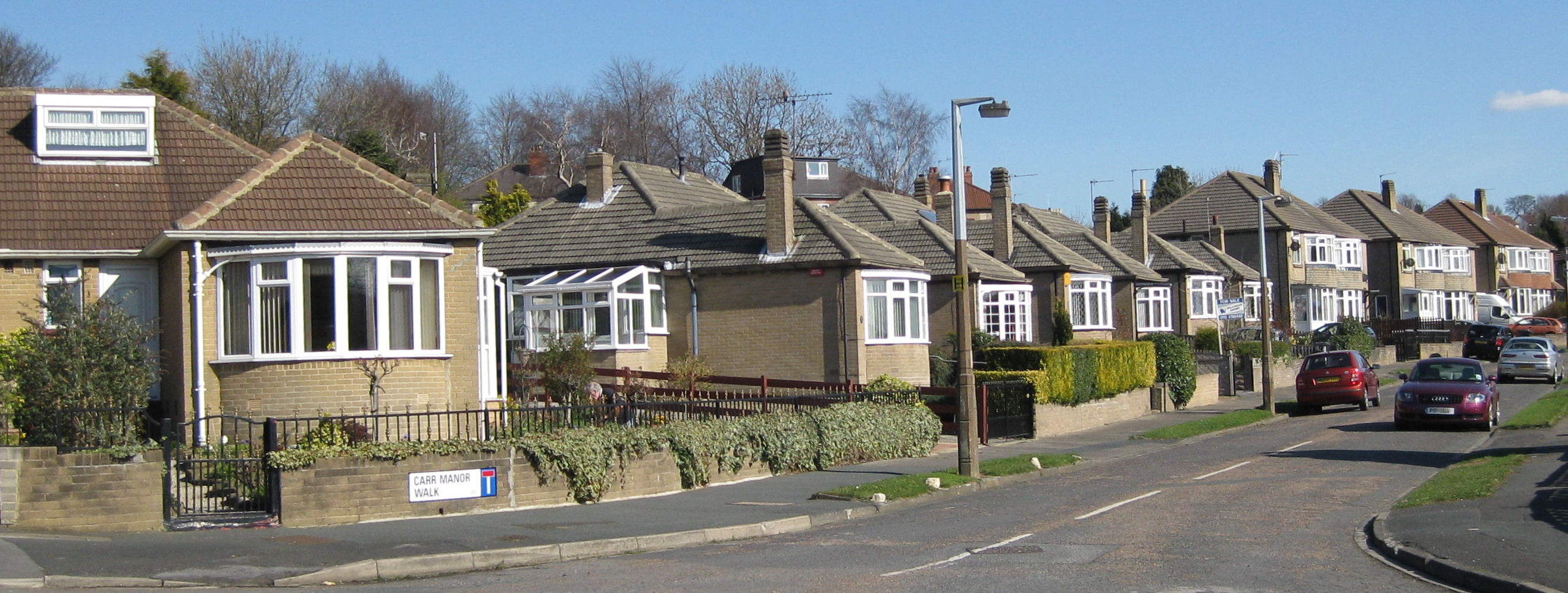
Carr Manor Walk later residences

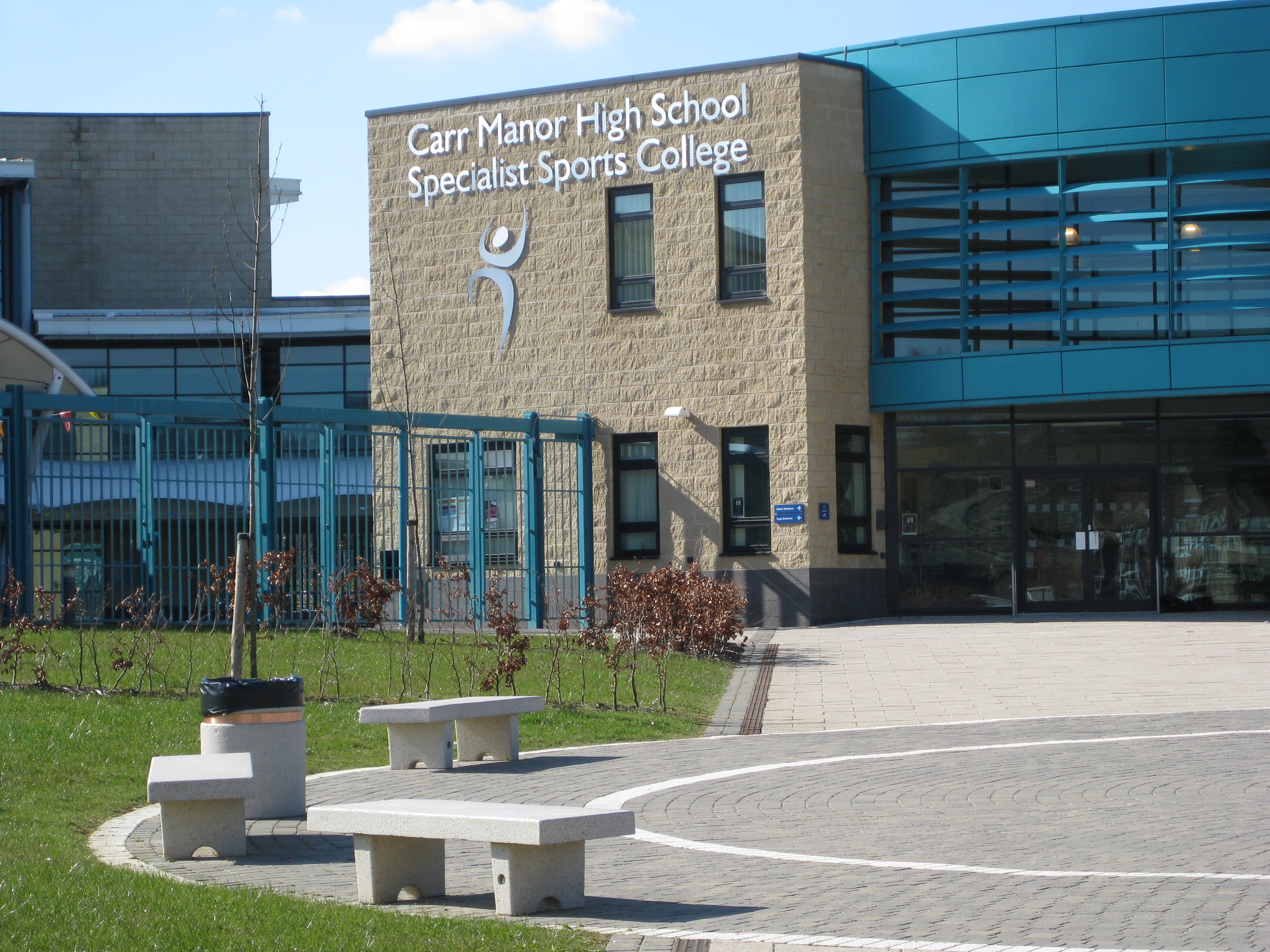
Carr Manor Community School

=== Farm Hill ===
Early photographs show the Model Farm, which occupied the hillside, with fields in which rhubarb was grown. The area also hosted Sugarwell Hill Mill which had a distinctive round chimney.

Farm Hill estate

In 1919, 80 acres of land to the south of Meanwood, close to Woodhouse Ridge, was sold by the Model Farm to Leeds Corporation. The Farm Hill housing estate was developed on the land. The area was often referred to informally as the 'white houses' because of the colour the concrete was rendered. The estate became a concentration of bad press for Meanwood very quickly. Most of the original houses were demolished in the late 1980s and many of the residents were moved to the Beckhill estate. The opening credits to police drama Parkin's Patch began with a scene shot at Farm Hill.

View of Farm Hill Way and Boothroyd Drive, showing the Model Farm towards the bottom left. Woodhouse Cricket Club can also be seen.

The area was redeveloped in 1990 as a series of two- and three-bedroom semi-detached houses and bungalows, around half of which are privately owned. A few of the original 1920s houses remain on the fringes of the estate. The Model Farm, after which the hillside and estate is named, is still standing today (situated off Farm Hill South) with a number of fields used as pasture for horses. Many of the streets in the area are still known as Farm Hill. The estate also hosts the much newer Meanwood Valley Urban Farm. A network of woodland and field footpaths connect the estate to Potternewton Lane, Buslingthorpe Lane and Woodhouse Ridge.

In 2000, a further estate of residential houses was built on the opposite side of Meanwood Road, centred around Boothroyd Drive. Although the Farm Hills and Boothroyd Drive are contiguous, Meanwood Road divides the older and new estates and represents a political and postal boundary. Houses on the Farm Hill have an LS7 postcode, whilst houses on the south side of Meanwood Road have an LS6 postcode.

Woodhouse Community Sports and Social Club is sandwiched between the two developments (despite its name, the club house and pitches are in Meanwood, not Woodhouse). The club hosts cricket (Woodhouse Cricket Club) and amateur rugby league (both Headingley Hawks and Woodhouse Warriors).

== Religion ==
The Church of England parish church is Holy Trinity Church, a Grade II* listed building consecrated in 1849, designed by William Railton in the lancet Gothic style. Its clock was designed by Edmund Beckett and made by Edward John Dent, who was responsible for Big Ben. It has three faces, as there was open country to the east.

The Methodist Church was built in 1881 in a modified Gothic style, and enlarged seven years later to accommodate a further 120 seats. A previous Methodist Church in Meanwood had been built in 1811. The church building was closed in October 2014 and the church community moved to use the Holy Trinity Church building. The building is now used by the Iglesia ni Cristo.

St Oswald's Church was built in 1890 as a chapel of ease for St Chad's of Far Headingley. It was enlarged in 1910 and made into a church, but closed in 2002 and the congregation moved to St Chad's.

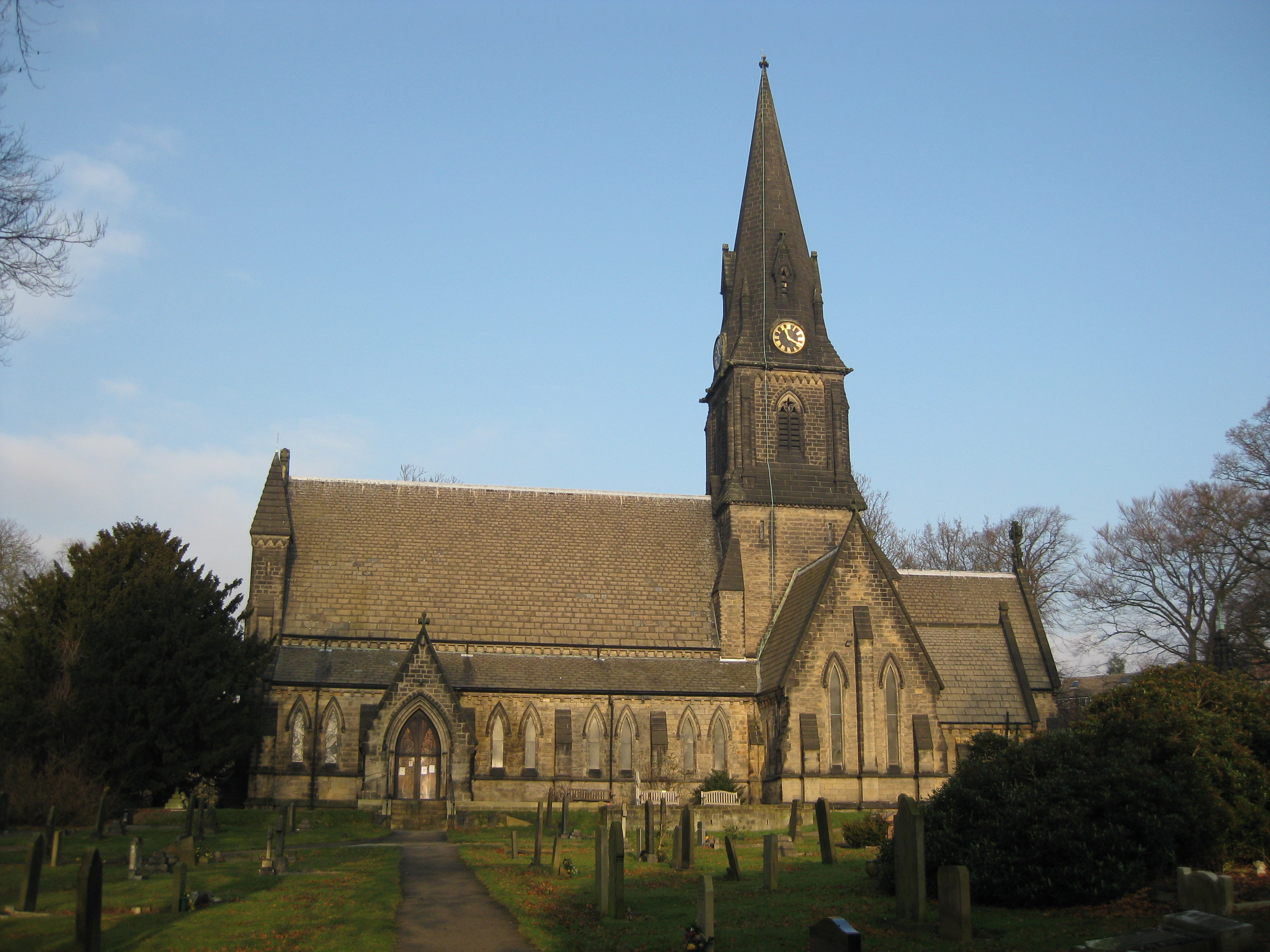
Holy Trinity Church

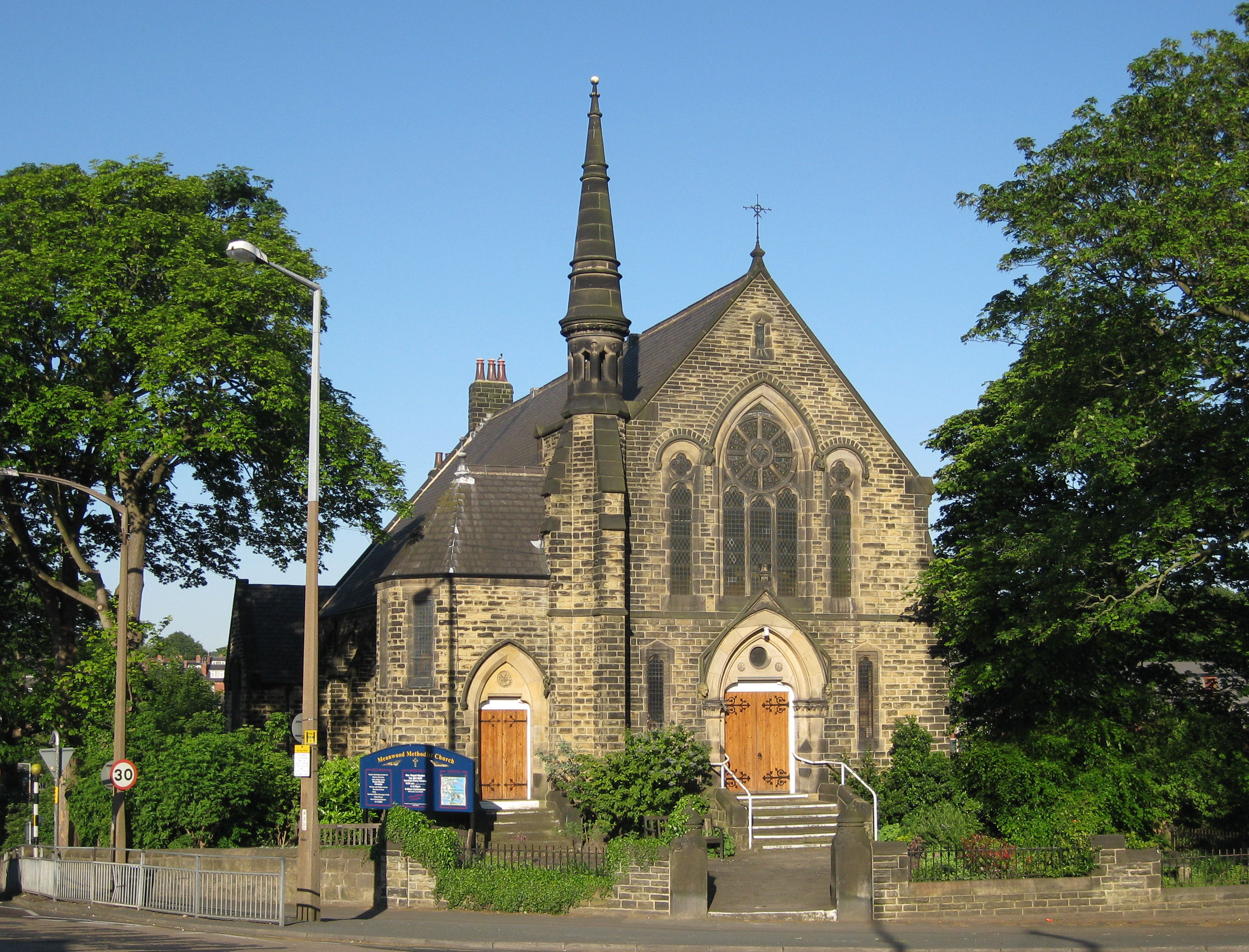
Former Meanwood Methodist Church

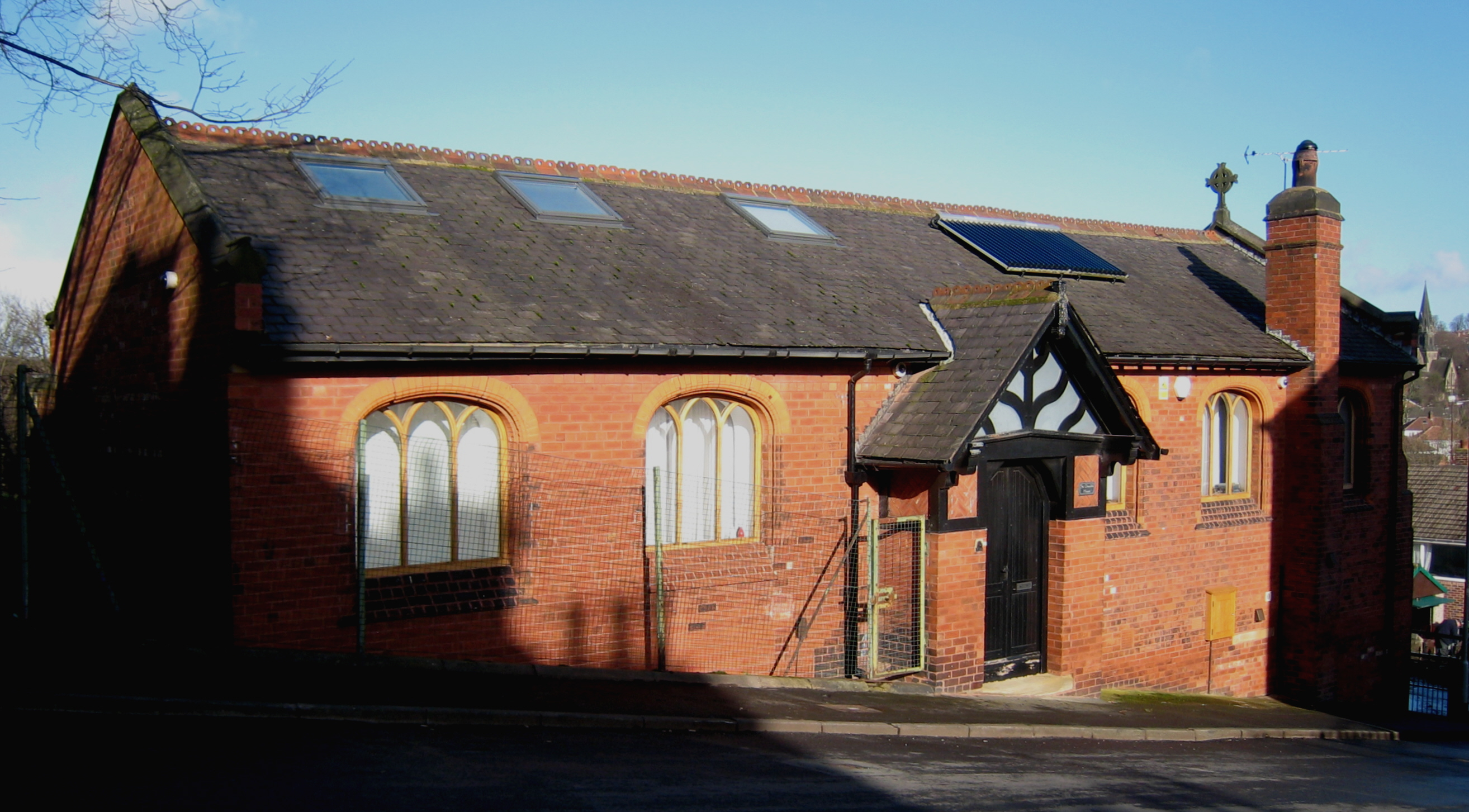
Former St Oswald's Church

== Community groups ==
Meanwood Valley Partnership is a not-for-profit organisation made up of residents and volunteers that focuses on caring for and preserving the Meanwood Valley, a stretch of land approximately one mile across and two miles long. It is focused on retaining the village atmosphere and holds events such as an annual funday and restoration work on projects such as the war memorial.

YMAV Youth Movement Against Violence cic is a not-for-profit organisation founded in 2016. They support the victims and families affected by violence in a holistic approach providing 1–1 outreach support, counselling and holistic therapies. They also provide many community-based projects running from Meanwood Community Centre, including a tea-time club, yoga group. They recently started a project called Restore Community Healing Garden. See www.ymav.co.uk for more information.

== Sport and social activities ==
Numerous sporting activities exist in Meanwood, including the Meanwood Valley Trail Race (a cross country race that has been going since 1996), amateur cricket and rugby league. Meanwood Cricket Club has existed since at least 1870, and has played at their present ground since 1895. The club is ECB Clubmark accredited and are currently members of the Dales Council Cricket League, Airedale & Wharfedale Junior Cricket League, Leeds & Wetherby Junior Cricket League & West Yorkshire Women & Girls Cricket League. They run senior, women & girls, junior and disability cricket teams. The club enjoyed a successful period from 1989 to 2002 winning the League Pools Paper Mills Cup a then record six times – appearing in eight finals in the space of 12 years – and also claimed a League and Cup double in 1998.

== Notable residents ==
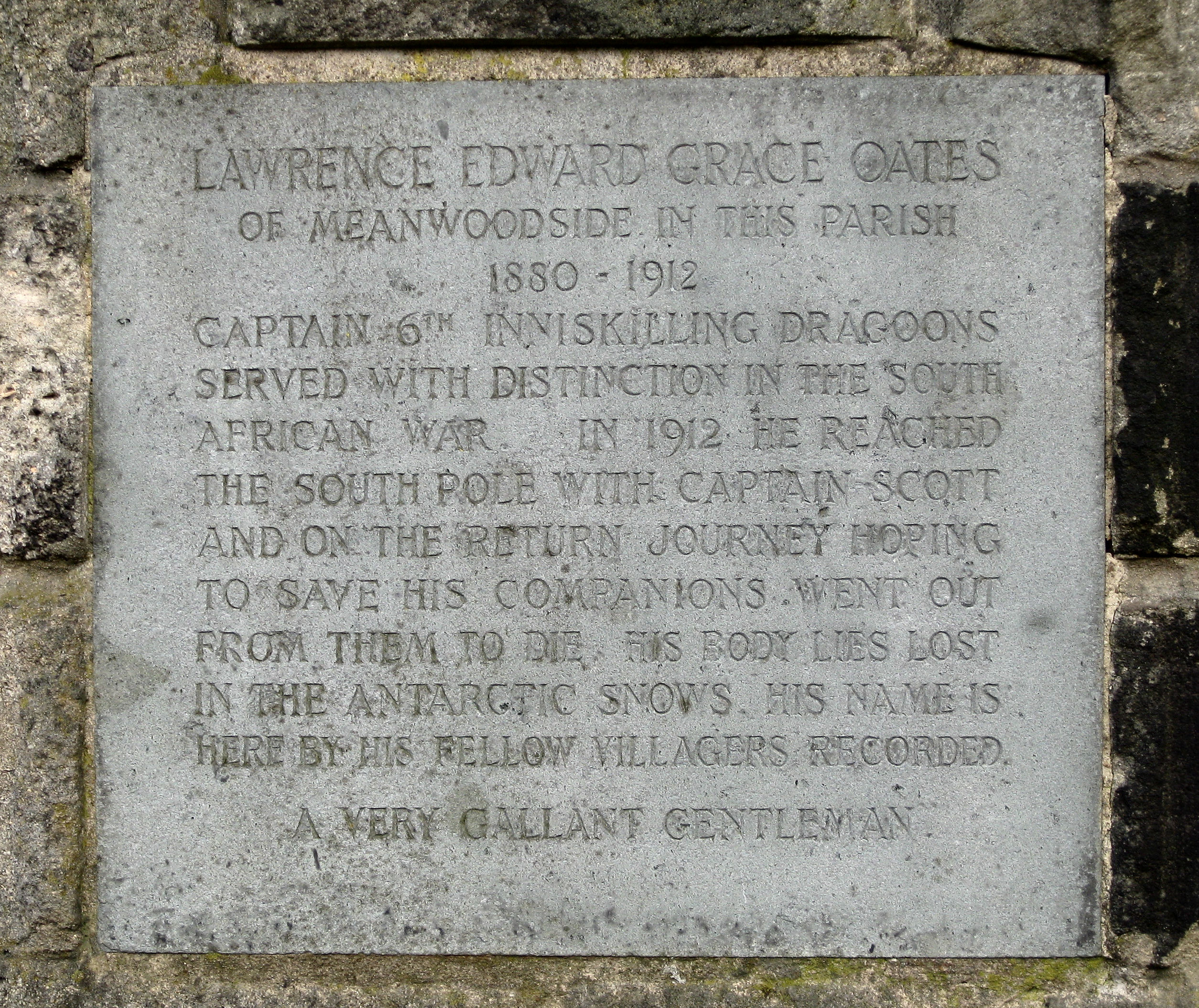
Oates Memorial sign, Memorial Drive

Captain Lawrence Oates (of the ill-fated Scott expedition to Antarctica) often resided in Meanwood. There is a monument to his altruism close to Holy Trinity Church. The Lawrence Oates School (closed 1992) was named after him. In 2012, on the 100th anniversary of his death, a blue plaque was unveiled in his honour at Meanwood Park.

Writer and critic Graham Holderness was born in Meanwood.

== In fiction ==
Nicola Griffith's 2023 novel Menewood is partially set in the Meanwood Valley during the Anglo-Saxon period. Griffith, who grew up in Leeds, included it because she enjoyed visiting Meanwood Park as a child.

== See also ==
- Listed buildings in Leeds (Moortown Ward)
