= Sugarwell Court =

Hall of residence of Leeds Beckett University

Coordinates: 53°49′07″N 1°33′06″W

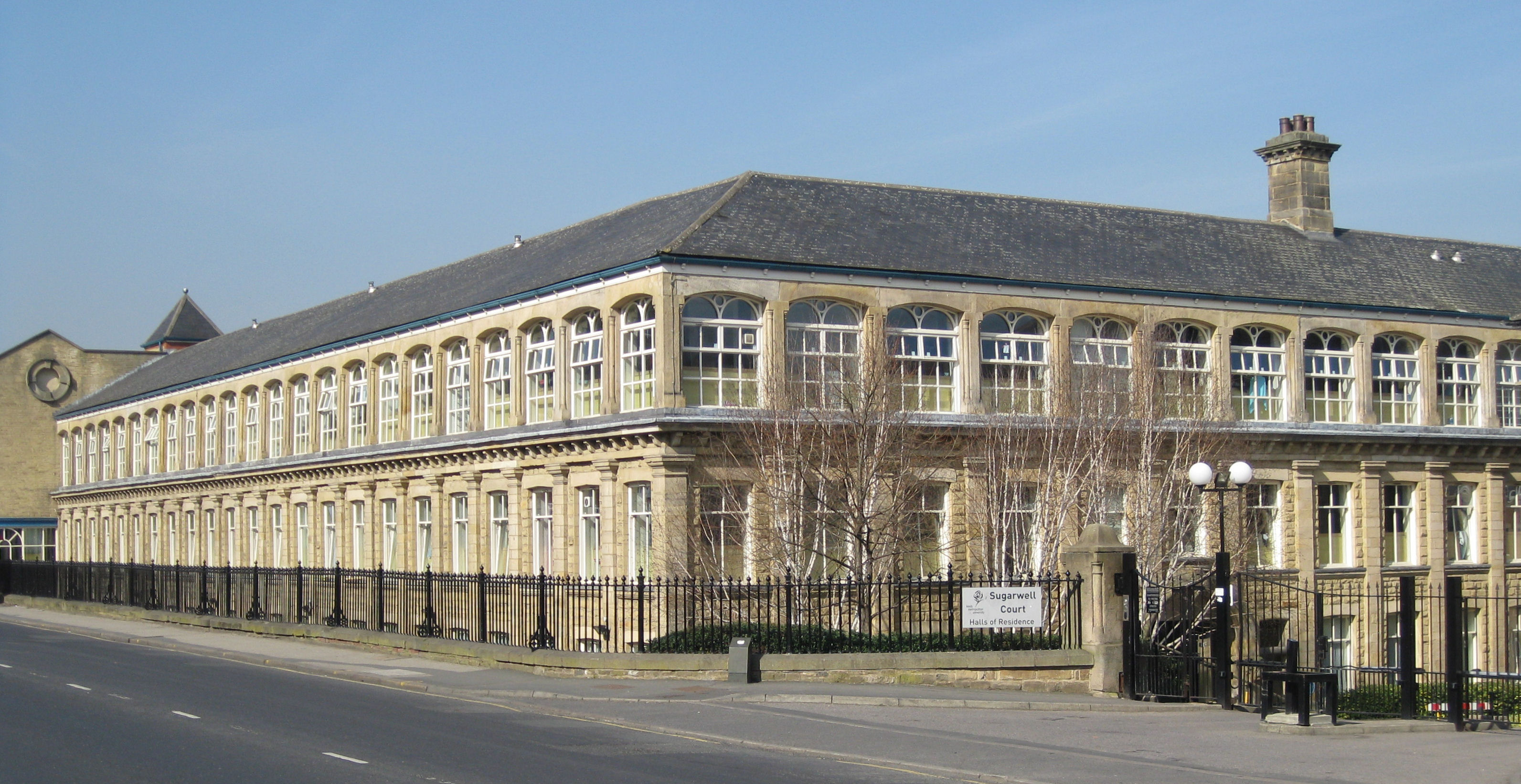
Sugarwell Court, Meanwood Road

Sugarwell Court is a hall of residence of Leeds Beckett University located off Meanwood Road in the Meanwood area of Leeds, West Yorkshire, England. There are currently 7 blocks based on site, which are alphabetically placed around the campus, called Airedale, Bishopdale, Coverdale, Deepdale, Eskdale, Farndale and Glaisdale. In total, the hall accommodates 388 people. Eskdale has facilities for disabled students.

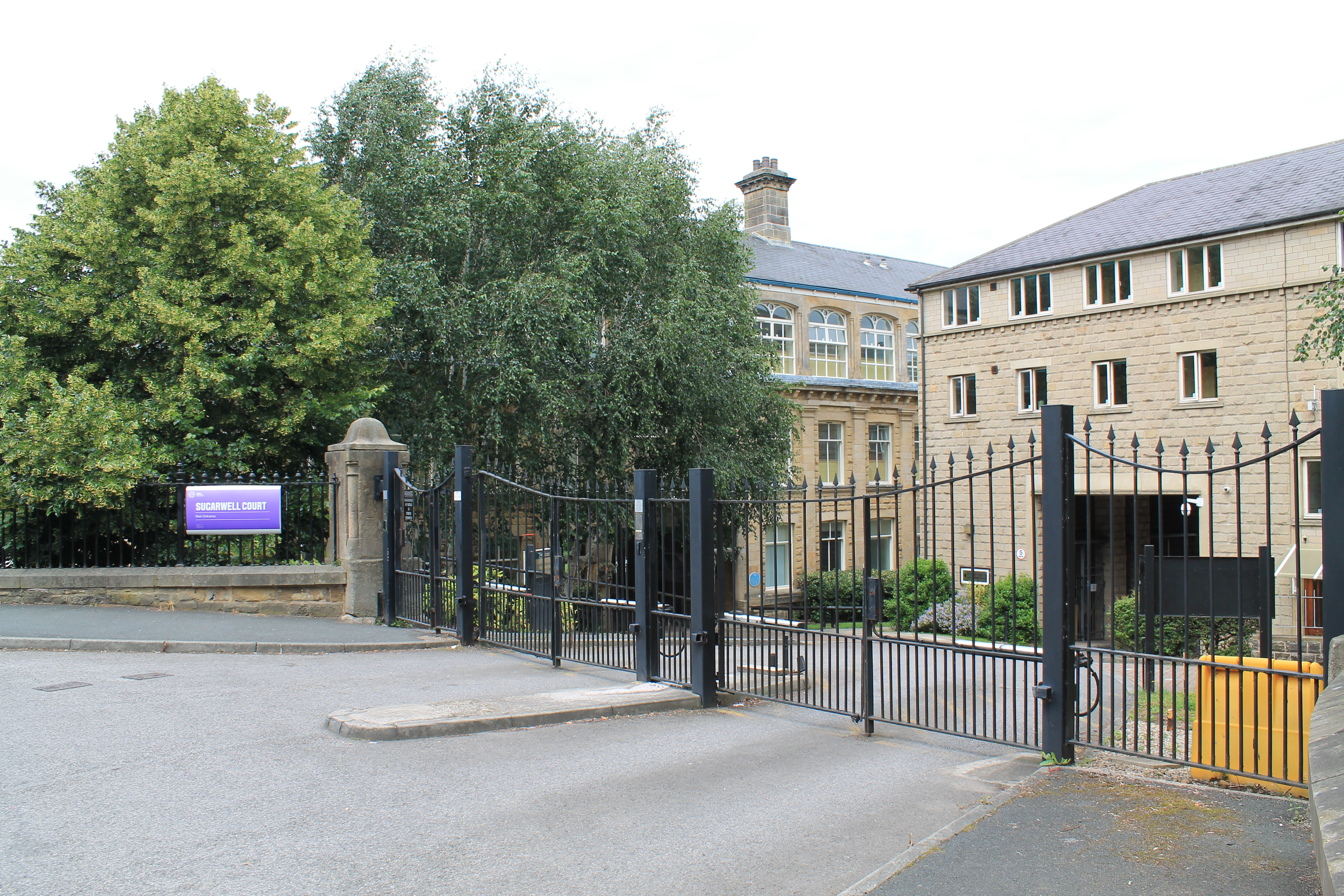
railings and gates

Part of the building is Grade II listed and based on a conversion of Sugarwell Works, also previously known as Cliff Tannery, which was a tannery originally built in 1866. The railings, gates and gate piers are a separate listed building. It was converted in 1993. The main buildings have been gutted and refurbished. It takes its name from Sugarwell Hill.
