= The Banks of Sweet Dundee =

Song

The Banks of Sweet Dundee (Roud 148, Laws M25) is a folk song very popular with and frequently collected from traditional singers in Britain and Ireland, fairly common in North America, and also performed by revival singers and groups. A young woman escapes a forced marriage by shooting dead both the squire who is her intended husband and her uncle who attacks her.

The song is also known as The Farmer's Daughter and Undaunted Mary.

== Synopsis ==
A farmer and his wife die leaving a fortune (usually £500 in gold) to their beautiful daughter Mary. She goes to live with her uncle, and falls in love with William, his ploughboy. Her uncle favours a wealthy squire, and when she refuses to marry him arranges for her lover to be taken by the press gang. William struggles manfully, declaring "I'd rather die for Mary on the banks of sweet Dundee", but is overpowered. Mary is walking in her uncle's grove "lamenting foe her love". She meets the squire, who puts his arms around her. She tells him to stop. He tries to "throw her down". She sees two pistols and a sword under his coat. She takes one of the pistols, the squire uses his sword, or in some versions she uses the sword too, and she shoots him dead. Her uncle hastens to the spot, and says he will kill her. She shoots and fatally wounds him. A doctor and lawyer are sent for, he makes a will leaving his gold "to Mary, who fought so manfully", and "she lives quite happy on the banks of sweet Dundee".

Though many versions end at this point, in others William is sent for and the couple marry:

Young William was sent for and quickly did return,
As soon as he came back again young Mary ceased to mourn;
The day it was appointed, they joined their hands so free,
And now they live in splendour on the Banks of Sweet Dundee.
(from the singing of Danny Brazil, of Staverton, Gloucestershire, collected by Gwilym Davies in December 1977)

== History ==
=== Early Printed Versions ===
The earliest broadside versions date from the 1820s. This song was regularly reprinted by broadside publishers all over Britain, and was printed by at least one in New York, throughout the 19th century. The earliest published collection of songs to include The Banks of Sweet Dundee seems to have been "A dictionary of the Isle of Wight dialect, and of provincialisms used in the Island; with illustrative anecdotes and tales; to which is appended the Christmas Boy's play, an Isle of Wight "Hooam Harvest", and songs sung by the peasantry; forming a treasury of insular manners and customs of fifty years ago" by William Henry Long, published in 1886. It was also included in Robert Ford's 1899 "Vagabond Songs and Ballads of Scotland: With Many Old and Familiar Melodies".

=== Collecting History ===
The Roud Folk Song Index includes at least 173 versions of The Banks of Sweet Dundee collected from traditional singers - 85 in England, 22 in Scotland, 8 in Ireland, 20 in Canada and 38 in the USA.

== Recordings ==
=== Field Recordings ===
These are available to listen online:

- Hamish Henderson recorded George Hay in Aberdeenshire, 1952
- Hamish Henderson recorded a version from Willie Mathieson in Aberdeenshire in 1952
- Ewan McColl recorded himself in Edinburgh in 1953
- Brian Ballinger recorded a version from William Ballinger in Gloucester in 1957.
- Prof. Kenneth Goldstein recorded Emily Sinclair in Aberdeenshire in 1960
- Gwylim Davies recorded a version from Danny Brazil at Staverton Gloucestershire in 1977
- Jim Carroll and Pat Mackenzie recorded Michael ‘Straighty’ Flanagan at Inagh, Co Clare in 1978
- A recording by Jimmy Houten made in Co, Donegal in 1987 is in the Jimmy McBride Collection.
- A recording of Grace Toland made in 2005 is in the Brian Doyle Collection.

=== Other Recordings ===
Robin and Barry Dransfield, June Tabor, Louis Killen, Grace Notes, Janet Russell, Rob Williams and Sam Kelly have all recorded The Banks of Sweet Dundee.

== Discussion ==
Most commentators on this song have remarked on how popular it used to be among traditional singers.

"This has been popular in nearly every district in England and in a number of places in Scotland as well. Though sublime doggerel, the song is even now a great favourite with the old folk, who still remember it. - Frank Kidson, 1891."

"Villainy and virtue, blood and tears, innocence triumphant: here are the ingredients of a strong 19th century melodrama. The ballad has remained popular with country singers until recent years." - Roy Palmer, 1980

"....a good example of the strengths and weaknesses of "broadside ballads". a strong melodramatic plot told sequentially and simply, with good triumphing over evil and love more important than money" - Steve Roud, 2012.

== Bibliography ==
- Lloyd, A L; Folk Song in England; London; 1967
- Palmer, Roy; A Book of English Ballads; Lampeter, 1980.
- Roud, S, and Bishop, J; The New Penguin Book of English Folk Songs; London, 2012.
