= Albert Alan Owen =

Welsh composer

Albert Alan Owen ARAM (born 1948) is a British composer and musician.

== Early life and education ==
Owen was born in Bangor, Wales in 1948. His father was Welsh and his mother Latvian (sister of the Latvian composer Alberts Jērums). In 1956 the family moved to Rhodesia (now Zimbabwe), where Owen grew up. He was educated at Alfred Beit, Ellis Robins, and Oriel Boys' High School in Salisbury (now Harare), and then at the Rhodesian College of Music (run by Eileen Reynolds). He played in the Rhodesian R&B band The Plebs.

Leaving Rhodesia in 1966 to continue his musical education in London, Owen studied piano with Harold Craxton and Angus Morrison and composition with Patrick Savill. Owen went to Paris to study composition with Nadia Boulanger (whom he continued seeing till her death in 1979) and piano with Jacques Février between 1969 and 1971. Returning to England, he went on to win the Charles Lucas Medal and Lady Holland Prize for composition at the Royal Academy of Music, and was a finalist in the National Piano Concerto Competition in 1974.

== Career ==
Owen taught piano at the Junior School of the Royal Academy of Music for fifteen years, and also taught a number of courses at the Working Men's College for twelve years, and was the dean of studies there in 1990–91.

In the mid-1970s, Owen performed with David Russell and Simon Climie as the leader of the classical fusion group Erato, playing classical, free jazz and electronic improvisation. He also performed with Katherine Sweeney and Adrian Thompson in the Corilla Ensemble , and with Sweeney, Milada Polasek and Peter Barnaby in the Emeryson Ensemble.

Owen's first recording of his own work, Keyboards and Strings, was released in 1979 while teaching at The John Lyon School and North London Collegiate School in London. Critics praised its "distinctive and original use of tone-colours". His second album, Following the Light was released in 1982, and was described as "an electronic-age tone poem" and "a work of modern impressionism based on many subtle variations of which Debussy himself could have approved". In 1987, it reached number 8 on the New Age chart, and was number 1 on the MP3.com Classical Minimalist chart in 2000.

Owen formed his own production company, Techno Arts Productions, in 1985 to release his recordings.

In 1985, he was asked to compose and arrange the finale of the Halley's Comet Royal Gala at the Wembley Conference Centre, a piece which used the massed forces of the New Symphony Orchestra, the London Chorale and the Royal Corps of Transport Band. His music has been used in film and TV and performed in the Wigmore Hall and Purcell Room.

Owen moved to Wales in 1990, where he continued to compose and taught classes in theory, harmony and counterpoint at the Aberystwyth Arts Centre. His private piano tuition has produced winners of the Urdd and National Eisteddfodau.

In 2002, Owen was elected as an Associate of the Royal Academy of Music for achieving distinction in the music profession.

In 2019, Owen's 1982 album Following The Light was issued in a new remastering by French label Libreville Records.

In 2023, Owen's new work Chorales was released by Libreville Records.

In 2024, Owen's 1979 album Keyboards and Strings was issued in a new remastering by Libreville Records.

== Works and recordings ==
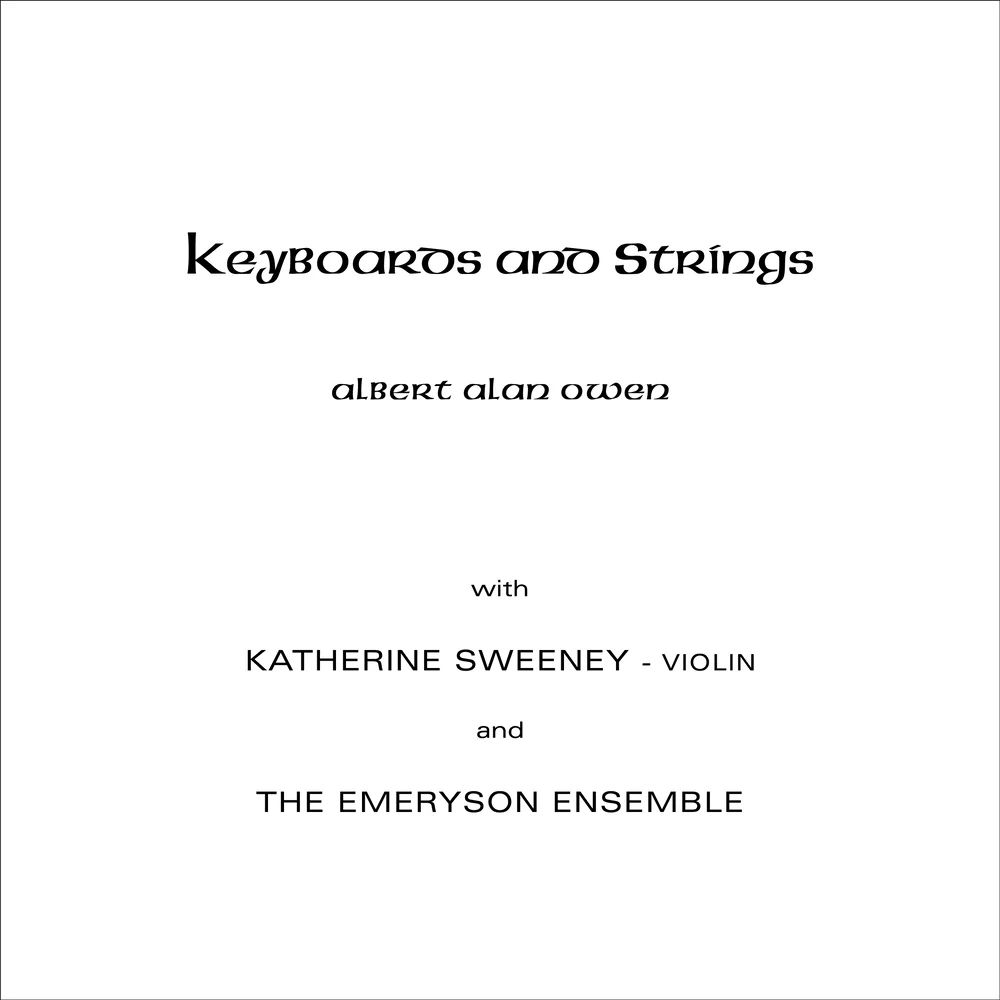
1979's Keyboards and Strings cover art - remastered and reissued in 2024

Album title	Label	Catalogue number	Year
Keyboards and Strings	Apollo Sound; Libreville Records	AS1026; LVLP-2311	1979
The Source of Light	New Experience	NE010	1980
Debussy, Szymanowski, Prokofiev, Shostakovich (with Katherine Sweeney)	Apollo Sound	AS1027	1981
Following the Light	Apollo Sound; Chord; Famous; Libreville Records	AS1029; CDCOLL 2 FAMDAT010; LVLP-1904	1982
High Places	New Experience	NE05	1983
Distinctive Themes	BTW	BTW108	1984
Technotown	Sound Stage (Amphonic)	AVF33	1985
High Life	Sound Stage (Amphonic)	AVF45	1986
Office Hours	Sound Stage (Amphonic)	AVF47	1987
Globe Trotter	Sound Stage (Amphonic)	AVF66CD	1989
String Up	Tap Records	TAPCD04	1996
Voyager	Vigiesse	CD1050	1997
Us Girls	Tap Records	TAPCD05	1999
Blue Queen	Tap Records	TAPCD09	2006
Know This Hear This	Tap Records	TAPCD11	2007
Chorales	AmiciMiei	AM-2304	2023
In Praise of God	AmiciMiei	(Digital only)	2025

== Samples and covers ==
- In 2013, Killabee ft. Lil Phat sampled 'Late Late Show' from High Life on their single 'Call Life'.
- In 2014, Molts Records Kids covered 'Robot Rock' from High Life on their album La Canalla Balla, Vol. 1.
- In 2015, Kaytranada sampled 'High Life' from High Life on his track 'Go Ahead'.
- In 2023, Mndsgn sampled 'S.O.S.' from Distinctive Themes on his track '(My)PLEASURE'.
