= Chapeltown, Leeds =

Suburb of Leeds, West Yorkshire, England

Coordinates: 53.816°N 1.531°W

Chapeltown
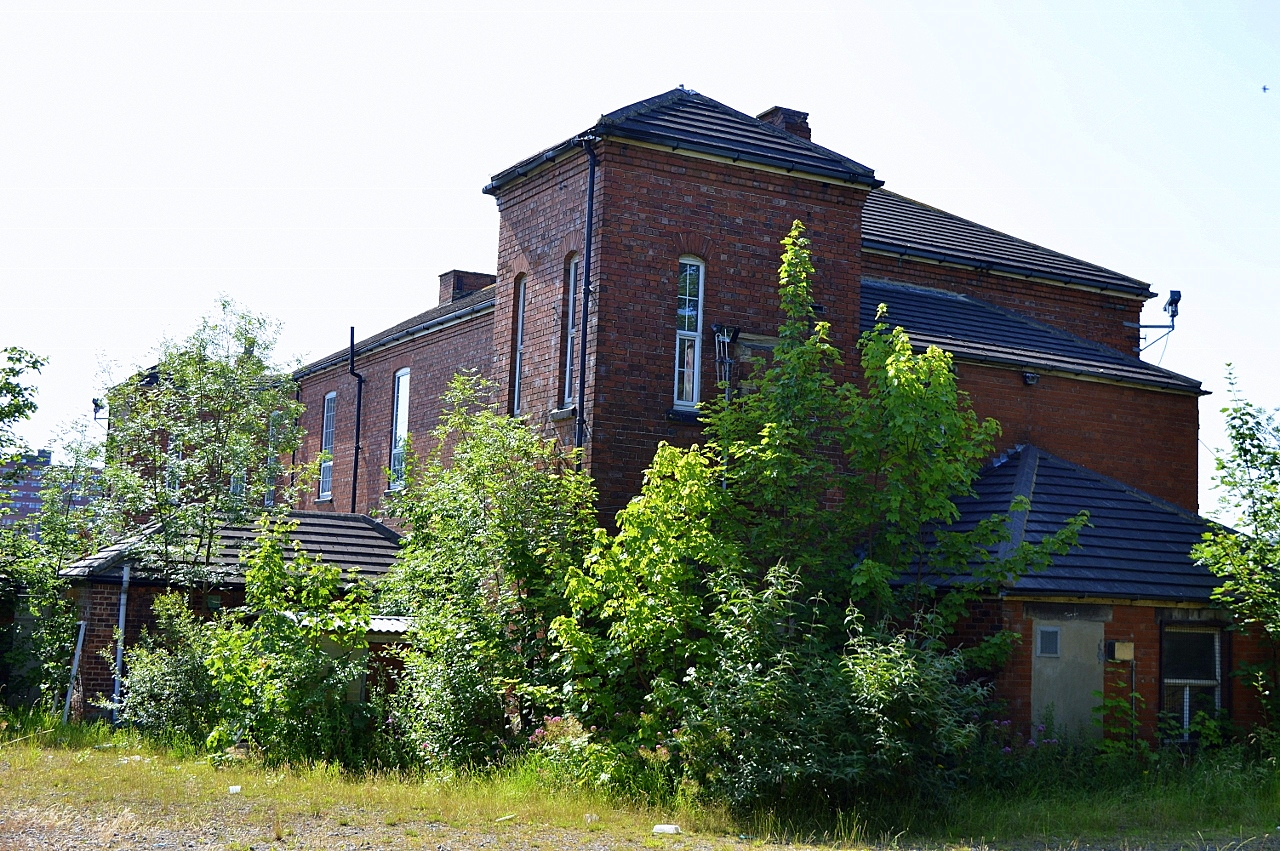
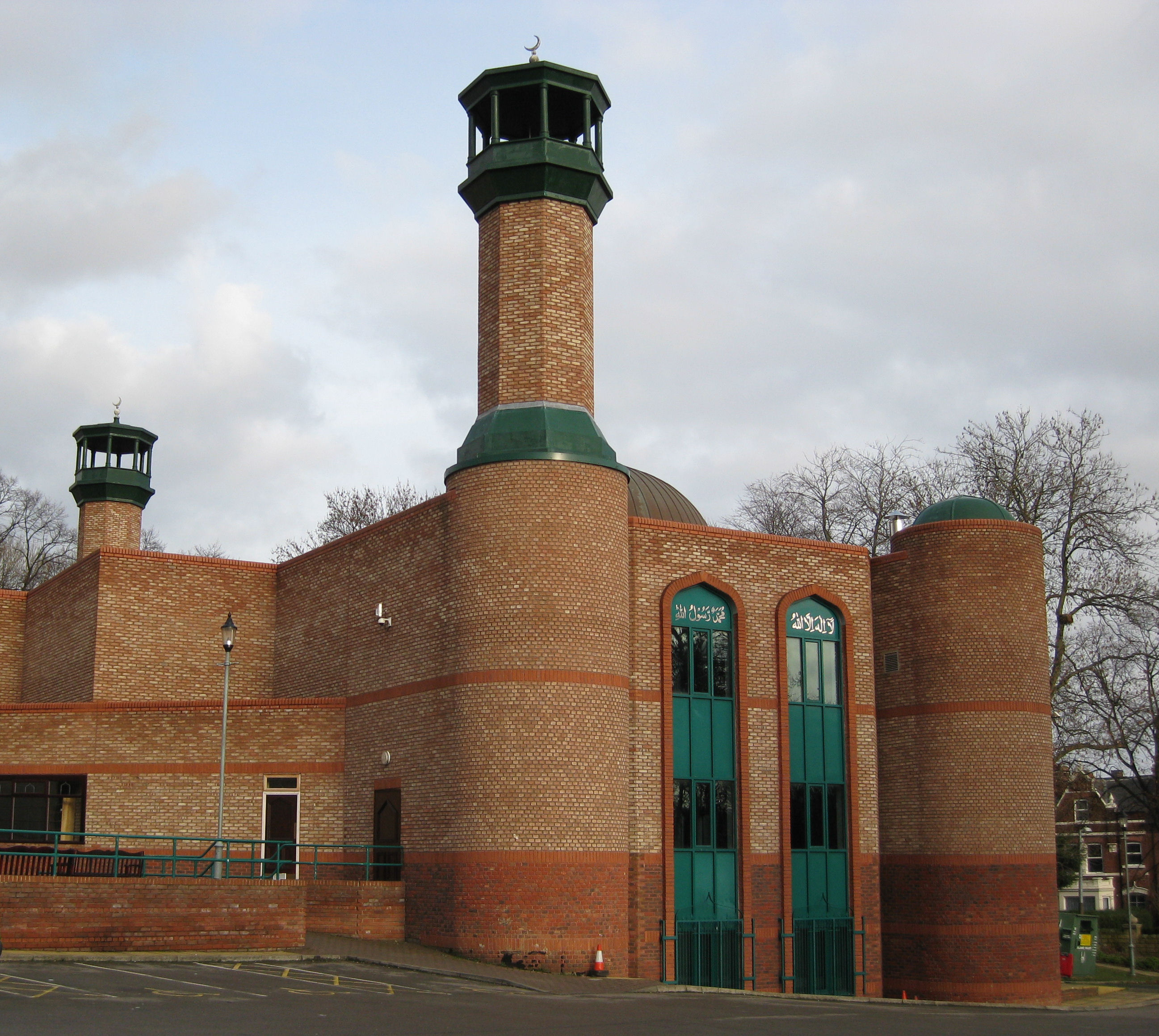
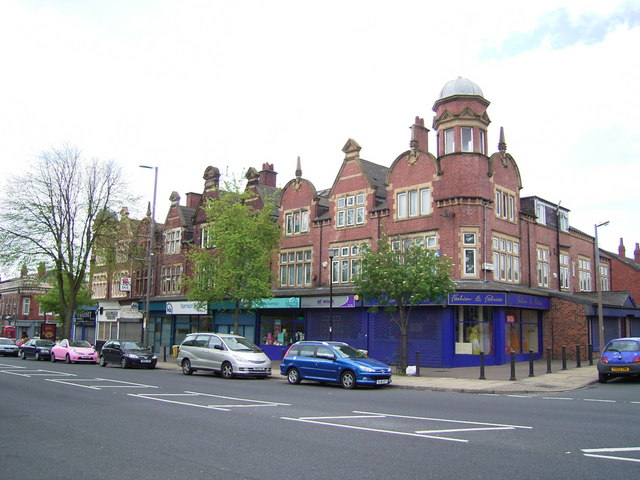
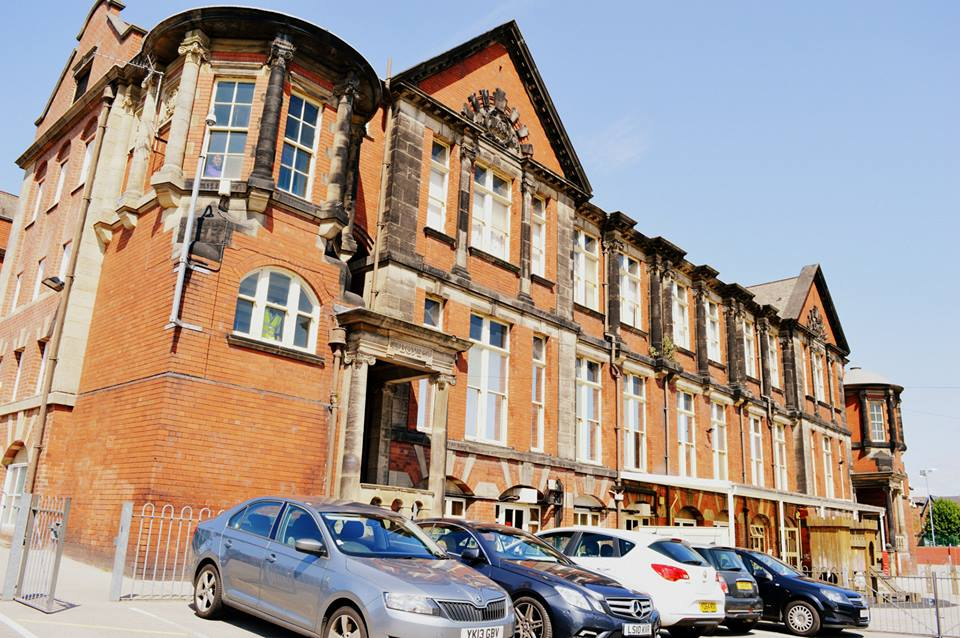
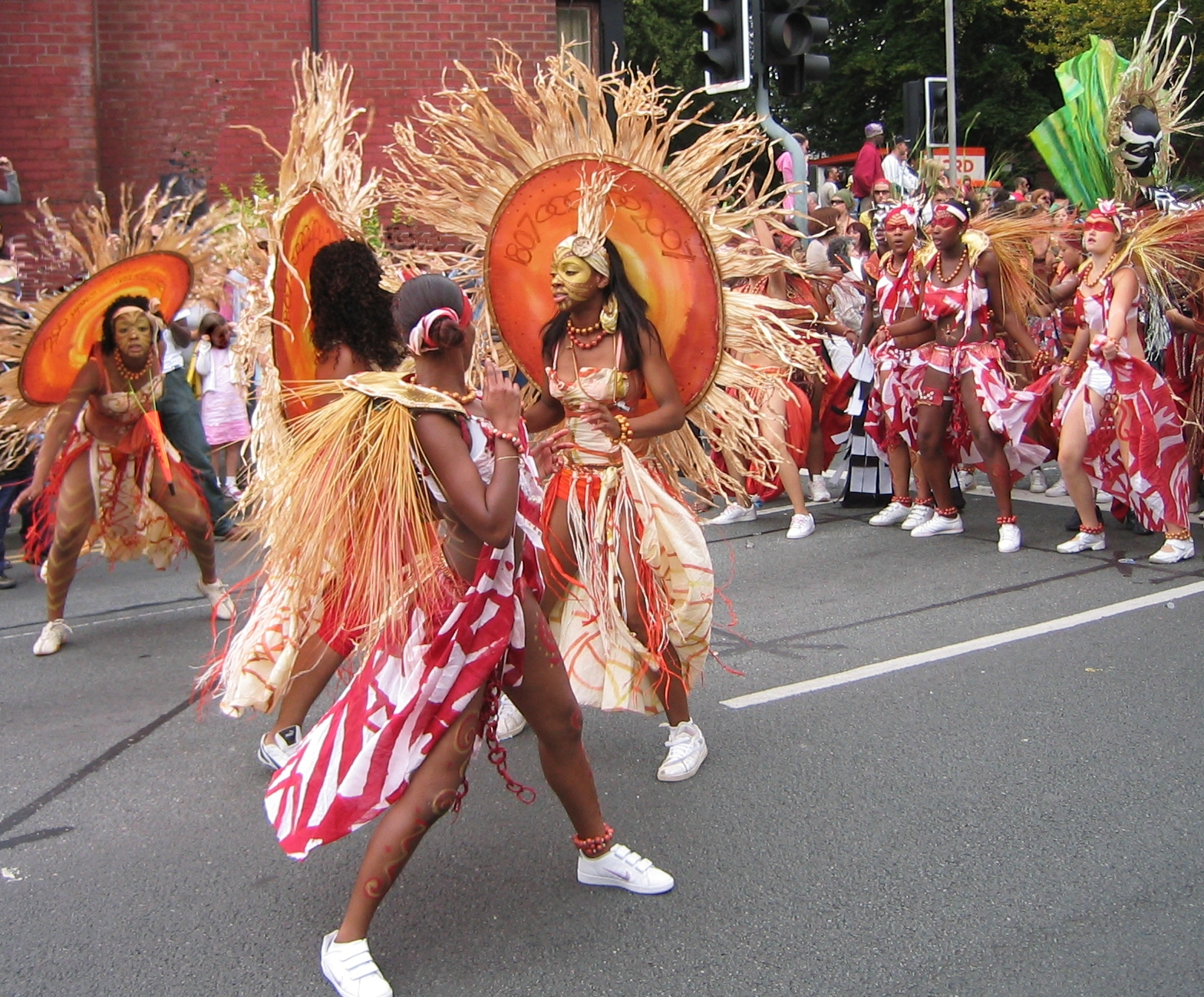
- The Barracks Jamia Mosque Chapeltown Road Hillcrest Academy Leeds Carnival

- Location within West Yorkshire
- OS grid reference: SE3093435637
- Metropolitan borough: City of Leeds
- Metropolitan county: West Yorkshire
- Region: Yorkshire and the Humber
- Country: England
- Sovereign state: United Kingdom
- Post town: LEEDS
- Postcode district: LS7
- Dialling code: 0113
- Police: West Yorkshire
- Fire: West Yorkshire
- Ambulance: Yorkshire
- UK Parliament: Leeds North East

Chapeltown is a suburb of north-east Leeds, in West Yorkshire, England. It is part of the Leeds City Council Ward of Chapel Allerton. It is approximately one mile north of Leeds city centre.

== Location and boundaries ==
Chapeltown is an informally defined neighbourhood with no official boundaries. Ordnance Survey maps place Chapeltown at around National Grid Coordinates SE430500, 437500, south of Harehills Lane (B6159) and east of Scott Hall Road (A61).

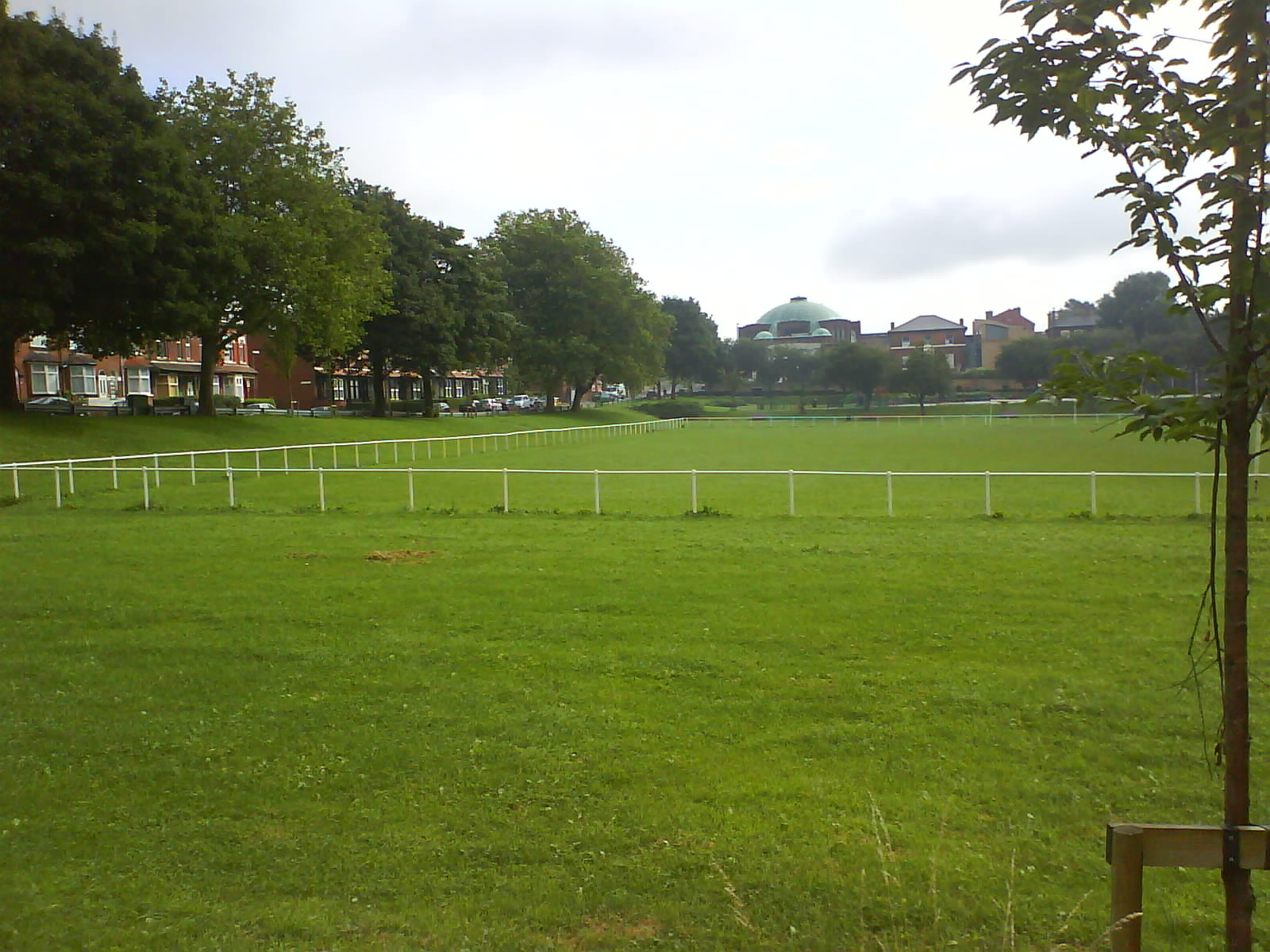
Norma Hutchinson Park

Chapeltown Road runs north through Potternewton to Harehills Lane – that is it leads to Chapeltown but is not on it. A wider definition is it is in "the LS7 postal region, and can be mapped through four points; where Scott Hall Road runs to north to where it intersects with Potternewton Lane, where Harehills Lane runs east and intersects with Avenue Hill, where Spencer Place runs south and intersects with Roundhay Road, to the very bottom and beginning of Chapeltown Road." The NHS Chapeltown Health Centre is at its south-east junction, the corner of Spencer Place and Leopold Street.

The Office for National Statistics define a Chapel Allerton South & Chapeltown statistical output area, which follows the LS7 postcode boundary on the east, with LS8 being Harehills. Roundhay Road could also be considered the boundary between them. However, it is widely accepted that Markham Avenue and Gathorne Terrace are the dividing line between Chapeltown and Harehills. Harehills is adjacent, and the areas are commonly considered together.

Neighbouring areas include Chapel Allerton to the north, Scott Hall to the west, Harehills to the east, Sheepscar to the south, and Potternewton either to the north or included. Taking the larger area, the main thoroughfare of Chapeltown is Chapeltown Road which passes through the centre of the area north–south for about 2 miles (3.2 km), linking Sheepscar Interchange (at the edge of Leeds city centre) and Harehills Lane/Chapel Allerton. Spencer Place in the east is another through route, and once well known as a red light district although the area's popularity with prostitutes has reportedly recently declined.

=== Chapeltown and Potternewton ===
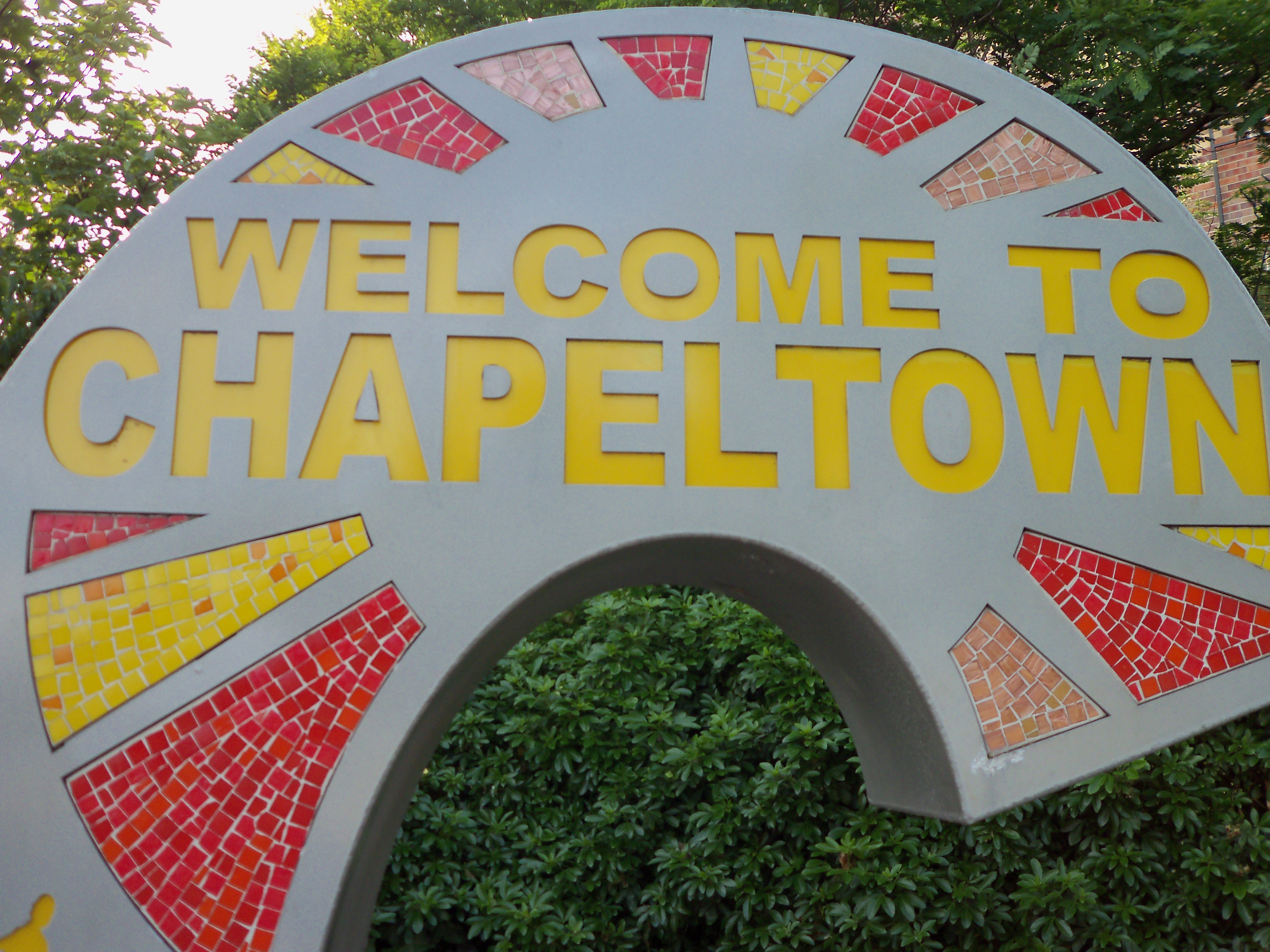
Public Art on Chapeltown Road

The names "Chapeltown" and "Potternewton" have become virtually interchangeable for the same area. The civil parish that governed the area before the expansion of Leeds County Borough in 1904 was called "Potter Newton", and the name is still used by the Church of England for the ecclesiastical parish of St. Martin's Church. The Ordnance Survey also lists the name "Potternewton" rather than "Chapeltown". Royal Mail classifies the area around Oak Road and St Marys Close as Potternewton, but does not list any road as Chapeltown. However, Leeds City Council now uses the name "Chapeltown" to refer to the area.

==== Potternewton Park ====
Potternewton Park in the north-east of the area is the venue for Europe's oldest West Indian Carnival; Leeds Carnival. Norma Hutchinson Park, a smaller playground and sports field in the south of Chapeltown was previously named Buslingthorpe Recreation Ground and was renamed in 2009 to commemorate Jamaican-born local councillor, Norma Hutchinson, who died in 2004.

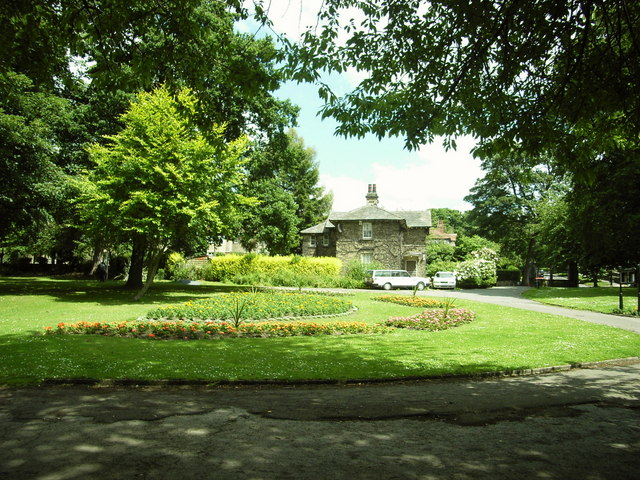
Potternewton Park with the Lodge

=== Transport ===
Chapeltown is served by First Leeds' bus services 2, 3, 3A, 36 and 48, which run directly via Chapeltown Road. The hourly service 48 does not operate in the evenings or on Sundays. Service 91 (Pudsey-Halton Moor) runs along Harehills Lane.

=== Schools ===
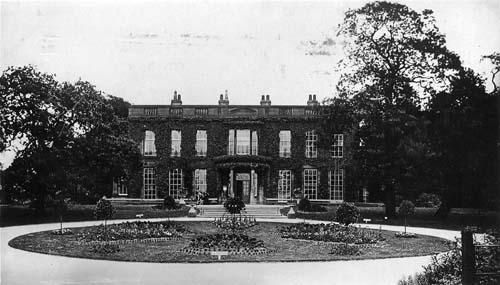
Potternewton Mansion in the Park 1909 postcard

- Bracken Edge Primary School is on Newton Garth adjacent to Potternewton Park. It was rebuilt and extended in 2007.
- Hillcrest Primary School, off Cowper Street has hosted events such as PFS (playing for success). Formerly Cowper Street School, it was the location for the Cowper Street School strike on 25 June 1973.
- Holy Rosary and St Annes Catholic School is on Leopold Street.
- Leopold Primary School, closed by 2002 because of overcrowding, became the Chapeltown Children Centre.
- Chapeltown Community Nursery is on Reginald Street.

== History ==
The name Chapeltown is in origin a reduced form, first attested in 1427, of Chapel Allerton, and once denoted the same place. Ralph Thoresby, writing in 1715, records Chapel-Town as a common name for the township of Chapel Allerton, describing it as "well situated in pure Air, upon a pleasant Ascent, which affords a Prospect of the Country ten or twelve miles". The open space to its east and north of Potter-Newton was "a delicate Green commonly call'd Chapel-Town Moor".

Chapeltown Moor was in the manor of Newton (Potternewton), some 300 acres (120 hectares), used for races, archery contests, and in 1765 one of the first cricket matches in Yorkshire, between "the Gentlemen of Chapeltown and the Gentlemen of Sheffield". By 1809, it was mostly enclosed.

In the 19th century, the area was developed as a wealthy suburb, and many large terraces and villas from the period remain, though a large proportion have fallen into disuse or are divided into smaller, low-rent flats. The area remains leafy and architecturally notable. Buildings have been adapted by successive communities who have settled in the area as places of worship and for a range of social uses. The Union Chapel on Chapeltown Road became a synagogue and then a Sikh temple, although it is now disused following a period of disrepair and fire damage. Chapeltown Barracks, now demolished, were completed in 1820.

=== Development ===
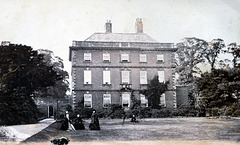
Potternewton Hall Estate, off Chapeltown Road – home of Leeds Mayor Darnton Lupton in the 1830s

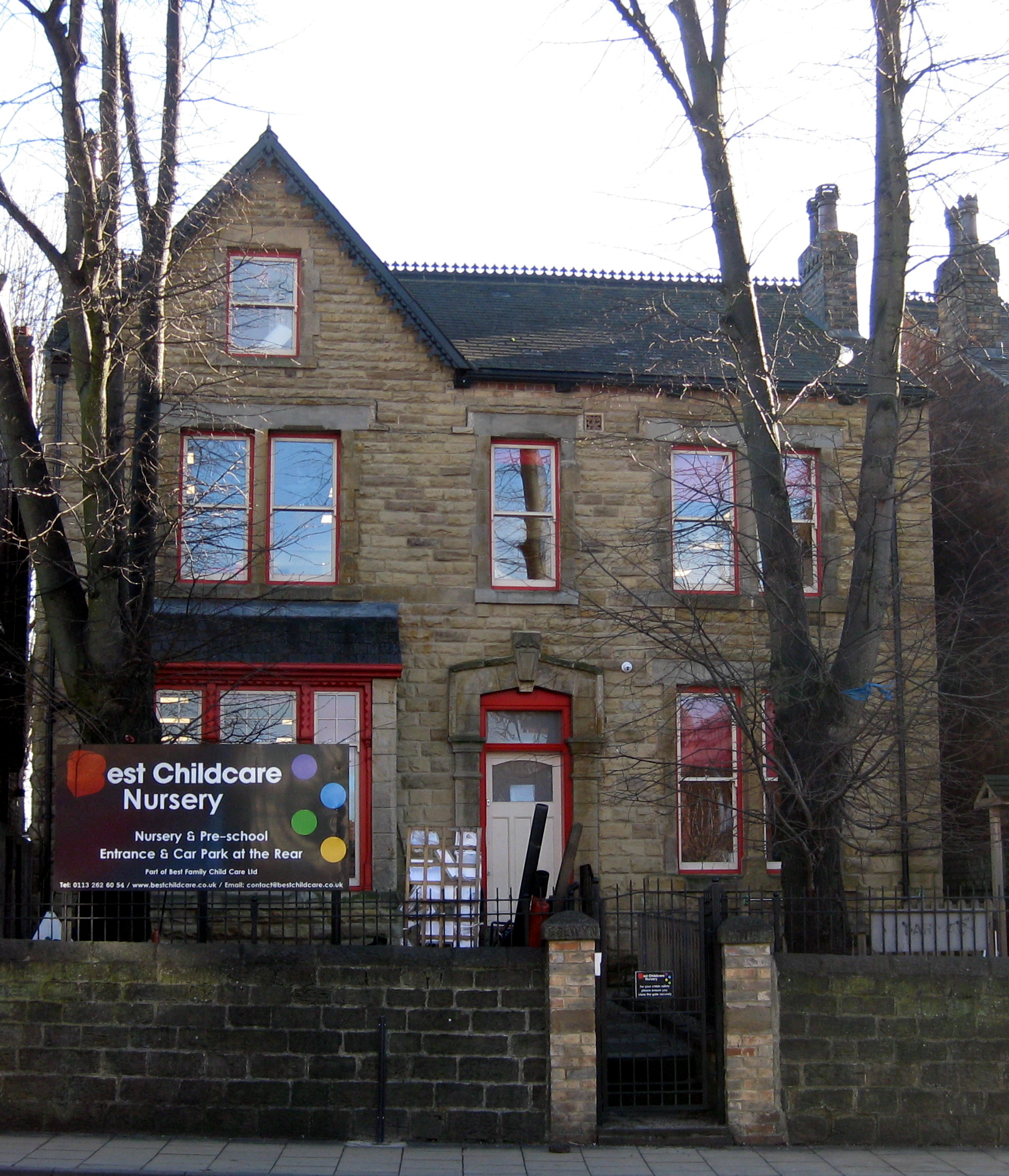
1966 former Sikh social centre and place of worship on Chapeltown Road

A map made of Leeds in 1834 shows that Chapeltown was pasture land between Chapel Allerton and Potternewton and Leeds and known as Potternewton. Through the centre of the farmland, which was earmarked as a planned "New Town" suburb, ran the Leeds-Harrogate Turnpike Road which later became Chapeltown Road. Much of the land, called "Squire's Pastures" belonged to Earl Cowper. He owned much land east of Chapeltown Road and some to the west. In the final decades of the 18th century and early decades of the 19th century legal disputes arose regarding the estates of the Barker/Ray family who had built Potternewton Hall "for the widow, Mrs Barker, to retire to" in the 1730s. They owned the estate, both the "upper house" (Potternewton Hall) and the "lower house" (Newton Hall) which was described by Ralph Thoresby, as a "venerable old fabric, standing low and shady". In "the first year of the sixteenth century", Low Hall (Newton Hall) had an estate worth 300 pounds a year. In 1837, Darnton Lupton was the Mesne lord under Earl Cowper of Potternewton Hall Estate.

Earl Cowper began selling land for development in 1825, but planning and building was slow, and the sale was not completed until 1873. The Earl also set out a Deed of Arrangement defining the residential character of any future building including the limitation of livestock, heavy industry and public houses.

By 1866 the area east of Chapeltown Road and north of Roundhay Road had acquired streets of pleasant houses intended for the growing middle class, and known as New Leeds.

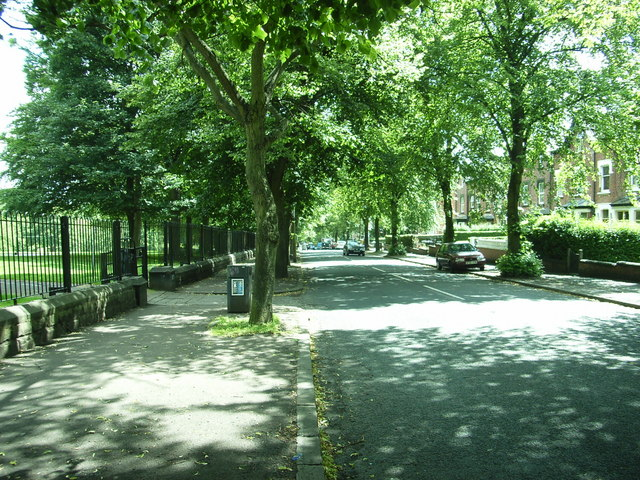
Harehills Avenue next to Newton Terrace Chapeltown Leeds

Further north towards Potternewton work began in 1856 on Newton Grove where the Lupton family developed their Newton Park Estate following the designs of Charles Chorley and John Connon. The development expanded, including Sholebroke Avenue by the 1880s.

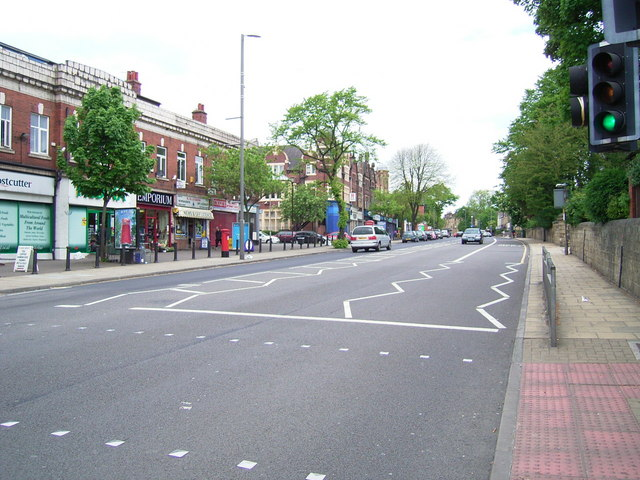
Chapeltown Road Leeds

St Martin's Church and shops on Chapeltown Road were built on Newton Park Estate land in the late 19th century. By the 1890s, the popularity of Chapeltown waned, in favour of areas further from the city. The remaining empty plots were filled with smaller, cheaper, terraced housing. By the start of the 20th century, the area was almost completely filled with housing. Newton Hall which had been the Lupton family residence was demolished in the 1920s. Potternewton Hall demolished c. 1935. Little building work took place in Chapeltown throughout the 20th century, unlike many other areas which were subject to slum clearances. Neighbouring Harehills was much the same. One reason that could have led to Chapeltown being left was the quality of its housing stock, although they now largely achieve low rents, the houses are generally well built as they were originally built for the influx of Leeds' new middle class brought on by the industrial revolution.

=== Population ===
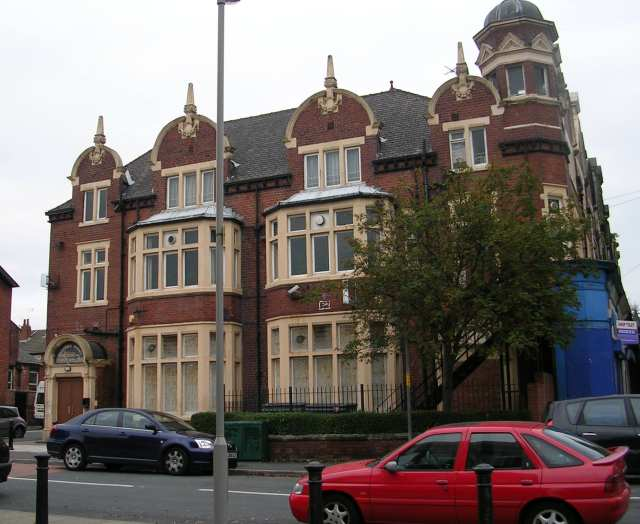
The Latvian Social Club on Mexborough Avenue

Over time Chapeltown has been home to successive émigré communities that have each added a new dimension to the culture, religious practices and heritage of the area.

Ashkenazi Jews fleeing pogroms in Eastern Europe towards the end of the 19th century moved to Leeds and settled in the inner city area of the Leylands. Other groups of Jews also settled there, and synagogues were built. In the 20th century many of the community moved north to the more desirable area of New Leeds/Chapeltown, and so did their synagogues, at one time there were 14 in Chapeltown. Along with neighbouring Harehills, where Montague Burton established his factory, Chapeltown was an important area for tailoring and allied trades, which occupied many Jews, and is remembered by the street name Button Hill.

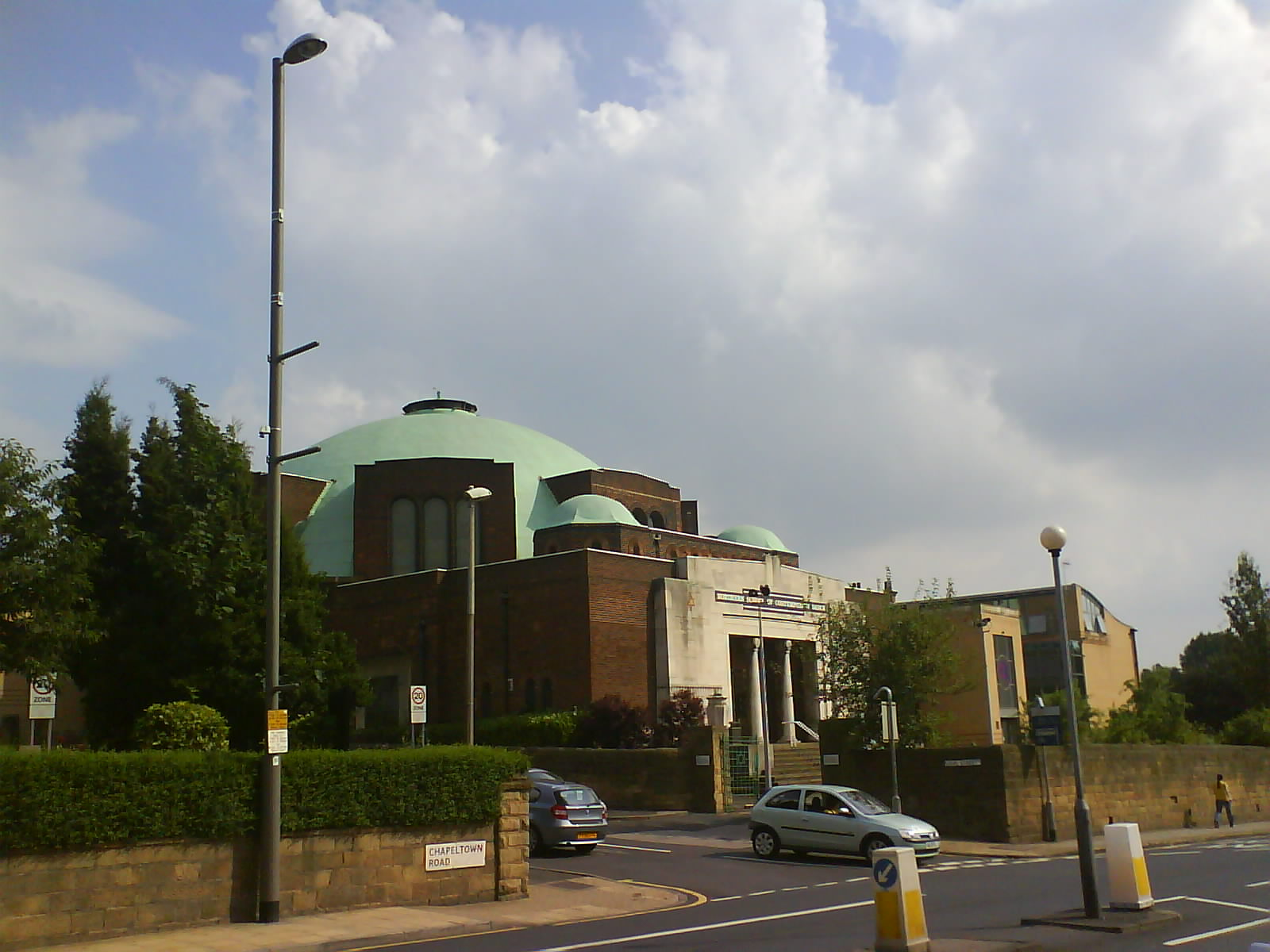
Northern School of Contemporary Dance

In 1932 the Chapeltown Road New Synagogue, a large domed Byzantine-style building, was opened. The opening was in time for the High Festivals of that year, with Rabbi Hurwitz delivering that first Shabbat Shuvah sermon. The artist David Hillman was commissioned, in 1935, to design three stained-glass windows for the shul (synagogue) in commemoration of the Silver Jubilee of King George V. They have been moved to Shadwell Lane Synagogue. In the following decades the Jewish population in Chapeltown declined as many families moved north to the Moortown area. In 1985 the synagogue closed and the building was bought by Leeds City Council. It is now home to the Northern School of Contemporary Dance.

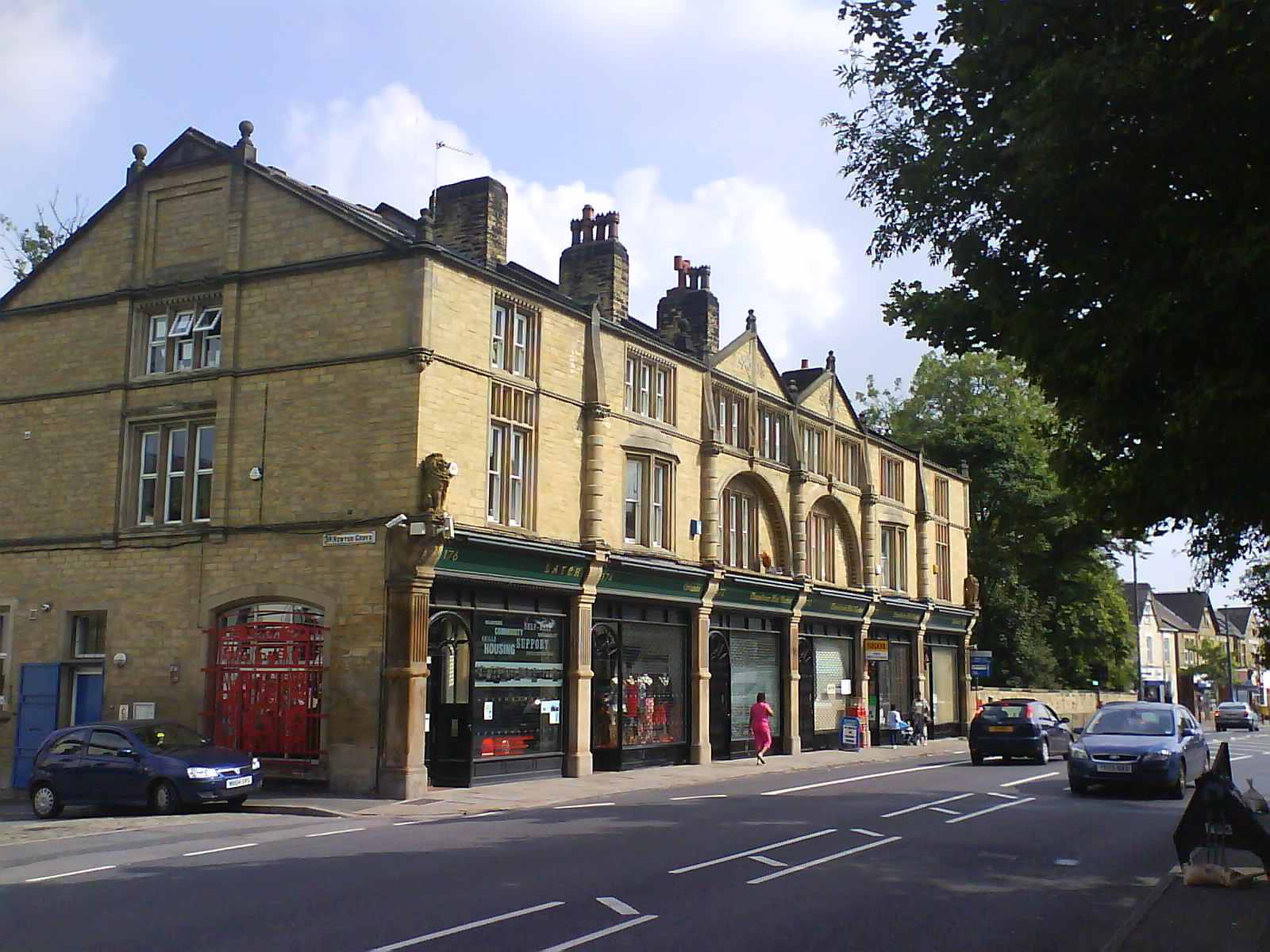
Chapeltown road

The British African-Caribbean community in Leeds mostly came to the UK between the end of the Second World War and the early 1960s. Many of the first Jamaicans to settle in Leeds were ex-servicemen. To encourage mass immigration from the countries of the British Empire and Commonwealth to fill shortages in the labour market, the 1948 British Nationality Act gave British citizenship to all people living in Commonwealth countries, and full rights of entry and settlement in Britain. The largest proportion of Caribbean migrants to Leeds at this time were from St Kitts and Nevis. Many of the first generation of Jamaicans living in Chapeltown today immigrated during this period. The Jamaica Society was formed, with headquarters at 277 Chapeltown Road to support the needs and celebrate the contributions of the African-Caribbean population in West Yorkshire and Leeds.

=== Recent history ===
In May 2003, Leeds City Council designated parts of Chapeltown/Potternewton as a conservation area in recognition of its special architectural and historic interest and to protect its character from harmful change. This enlarges the St Mary's Road (Chapeltown) conservation area on the former Newton Park Estate; this area being first designated in December 1974.

Around 2009/2010 the area became less run down with Spencer Place being prostitute free, the bus lane on Chapeltown Road being extended to serve the full length of the road, the addition of a bicycle lane, the decaying buildings getting repaired and the addition of the Reginald Centre, a joint service centre which replaces the original library in the area (similar to the Compton Centre in Harehills).

There are many innovative Co-op housing associations in Chapeltown such as Cornerstone Housing Co-operative, 301 Housing Co-operative and Chapeltown Cohousing.

== Culture and environment ==
The area is home to a wide range of community and creative organisations including the Northern School of Contemporary Dance, the Chapeltown house choir, the Host Media centre, and Leeds West Indian Centre (now famous for its club nights, particularly the monthly SubDub). The Leeds Caribbean Cricket Club was formed in 1948 by the Jamaica Society - the first Caribbean cricket club in the UK.

Chapel Allerton Hospital is found in the area, and is one of Leeds' main hospitals, though it does not have an Accident and Emergency department.

=== Carnival ===
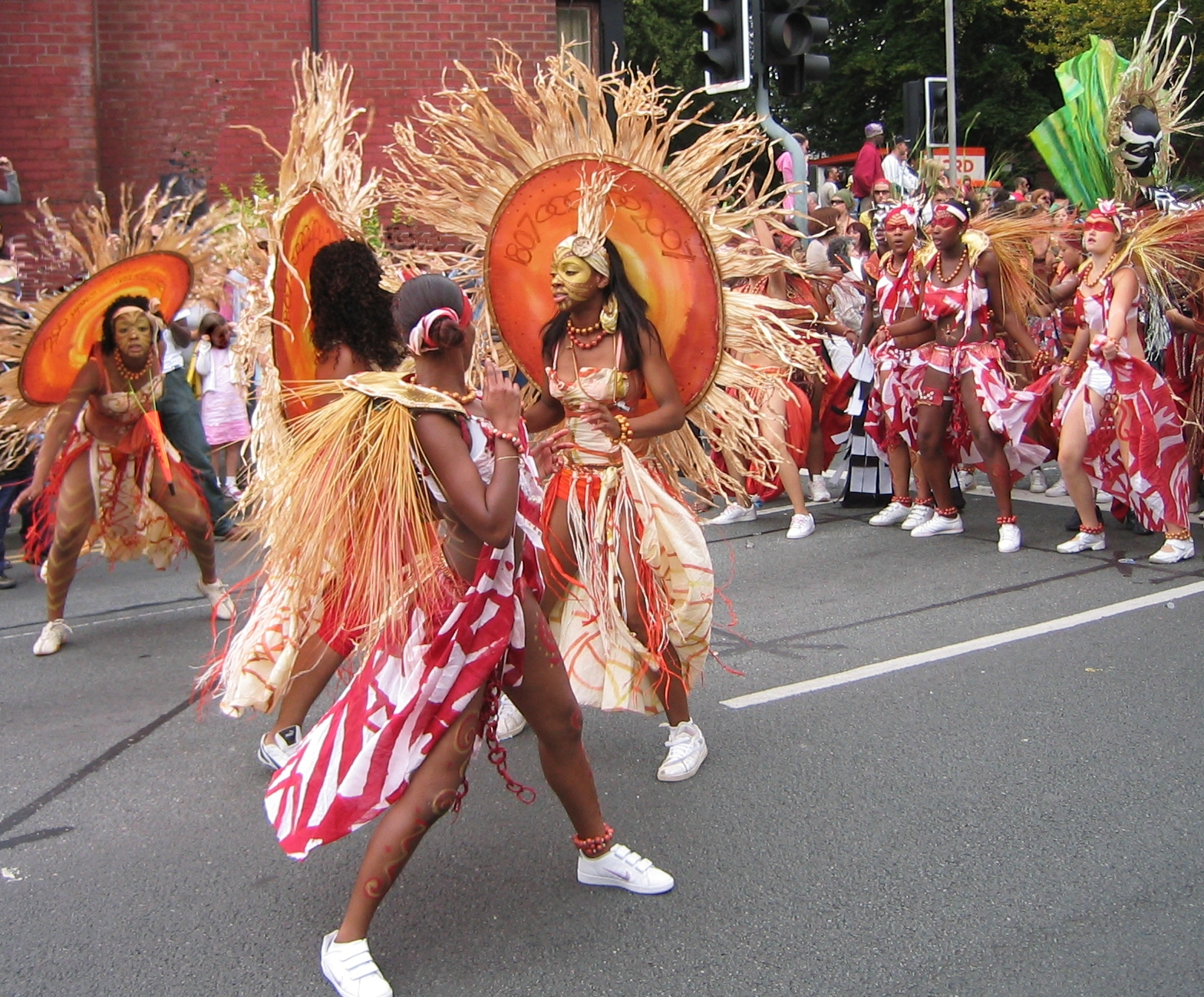
Carnival procession in Chapeltown, Leeds, 27 August 2007

Every August bank holiday weekend the area hosts the Leeds Carnival, second only in size to London's Notting Hill Carnival, however Leeds Carnival started in 1967 and predates that of Notting Hill. Arthur France, a Leeds University student from Saint Kitts helped to organise the first West Indian Carnival in Britain in Leeds in 1967. That year Vicki Celto was the first Carnival Queen for Leeds in a costume titled "Sun Goddess".

=== Northern School of Contemporary Dance ===
The NSCD is a modern conservatoire dance school with its origins in the Leeds dance education of the 1970s and 1980s. Two years after the founding of the school in 1985, it moved to its current home in Chapeltown in 1987. The Riley Theatre was built in the former synagogue, and over the next ten years a number of new dance studios were created on the site and the Brandsby Lodge was renovated. Today the school is a contemporary dance institution with nearly 200 students.

=== Crime ===
As a neighbourhood with a history of economic downturn, Chapeltown has been popularly associated with crime. The area has suffered social problems, including street drug dealing and gun crime in the last decade. However, Findaproperty.com states that Chapeltown's association with crime is "grossly exaggerated". The Leeds Index of Deprivation ranked Chapeltown 20th out of 108 areas of the city for problems with community safety, and it is ranked as safer than most other inner-city areas of Leeds.

In July 1981, it was one of the areas within cities that were home to race riots across England. There have been sporadic moments of social unrest since then including a riot in 1987.

The most recent riot occurred on 29 July 1991, when around 100 youths went on a spree of looting and vandalism throughout the area. Police believed that the main culprits of the riot were members of a local drugs gang.

During the 2011 England riots there were "small pockets of disorder" in Chapeltown after a local man was shot in the face and later died in hospital; it was later confirmed that a group of 10–15 youths caused damage to three cars in the area.

== Religion ==
The changing population of the area is shown by the religious buildings, particularly along the Chapeltown Road. At the North end, by Chapel Allerton Hospital, is the 1976 Roman Catholic Church of Our Lady of Czestochowa & St. Stanislaw Kostka, serving the Polish community (the Warsaw Stores on Chapeltown Road was a major source of Polish food in Leeds before a proliferation of Eastern European shops). Further down is St Martin's Church, the original Anglican parish church of the village of Potternewton, now with a mainly West Indian congregation. Then comes the Church of God of Prophecy, a Pentecostal church with a mainly Afro-Caribbean congregation. Next door is the new Sikh Temple, the largest in Leeds. Opposite, now out of use, is a church which was originally a Union Chapel, then a Synagogue and then a Sikh Temple until the new one was constructed. Near the South end, the Holy Rosary Church was built in 1937 for the Irish Catholic community. Until 1985 the next building down was an impressive purpose-built synagogue, the largest in Leeds, which is now the Northern School of Contemporary Dance. The Roscoe Methodist Church on Francis Street (off Chapeltown Road) dates from 1974, but replaces a chapel founded in 1862.

Elsewhere, a former United Reformed Church (1906) has become the Chapeltown Community Church by Potternewton Park. The Church of the Three Hierarchs in Harehills Avenue is a former Methodist chapel reopened as a Greek Orthodox church in 1966. As late as 1993, maps showed four synagogues in the area including the main one, but these have all closed. The first mosque in Leeds was created in a house in Leopold Street in 1961. With the influx of Muslims from India and Pakistan in the 1960s and 1970s, larger buildings were acquired in 1974 and 1982 to become the main mosque in Leeds, and finally in 2001 the Central Jamia Mosque was completed on Spencer Place.

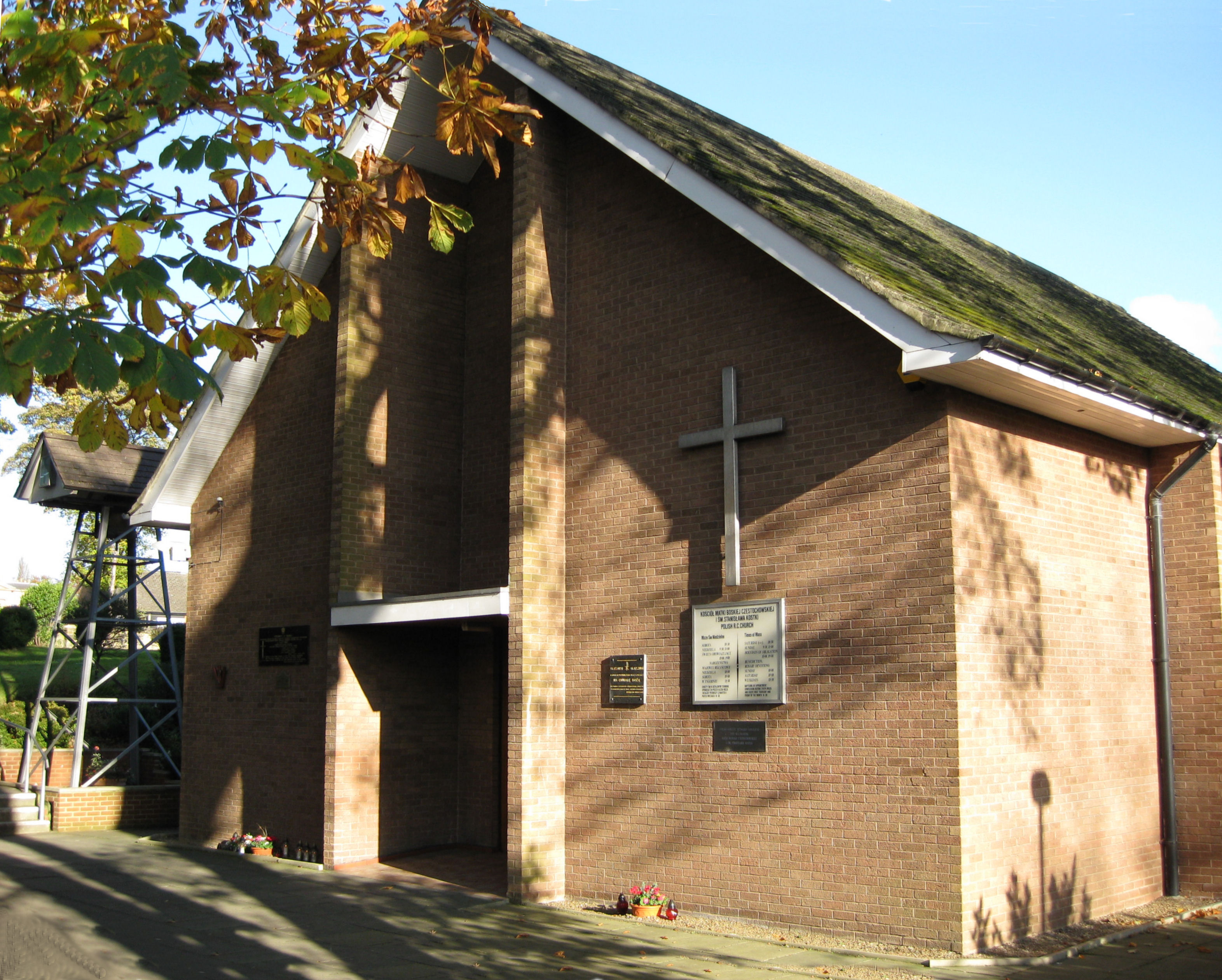
Roman Catholic Church of Our Lady of Czestochowa & St. Stanislaw Kostka

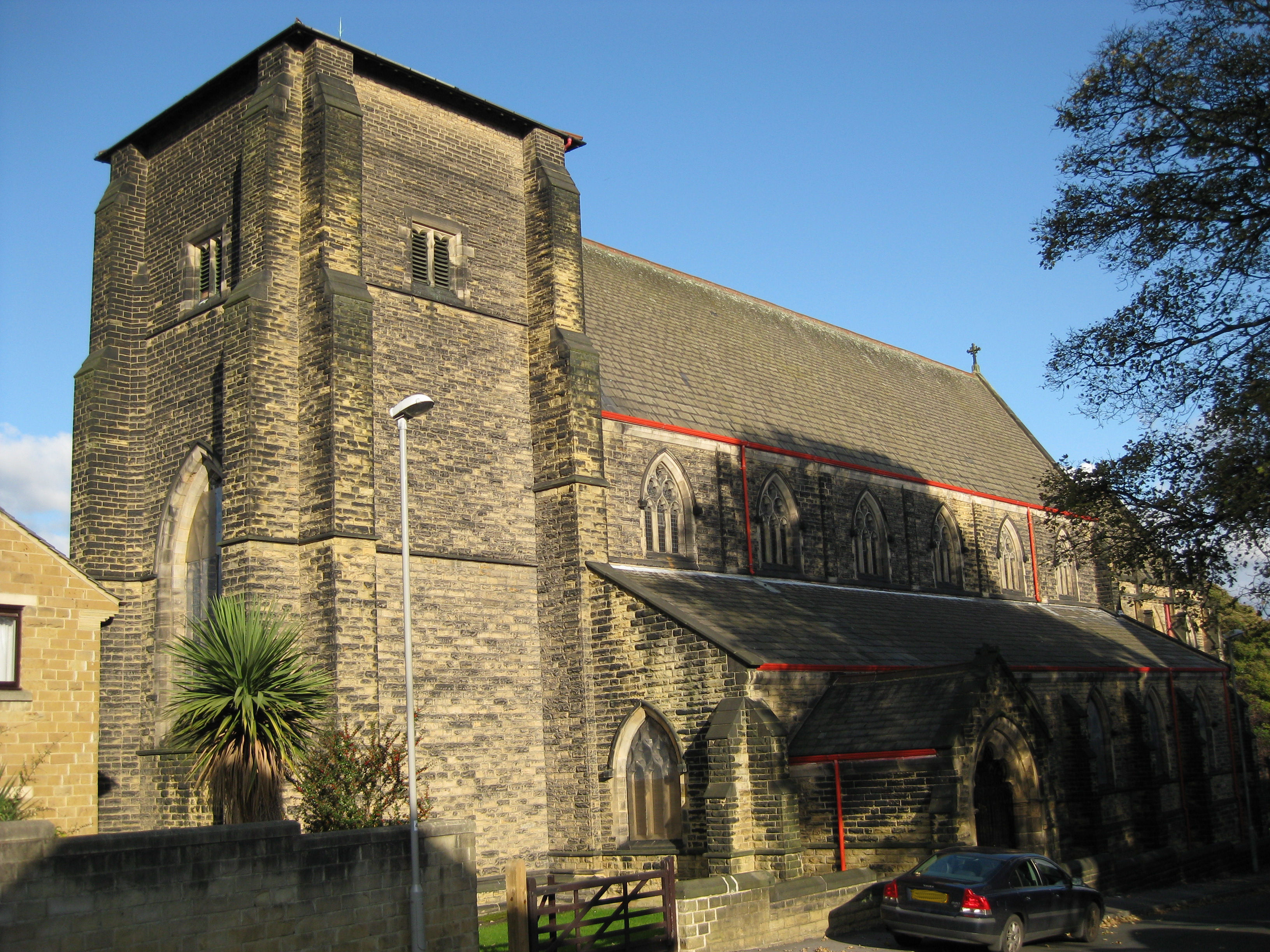
St Martin's Church of England parish church

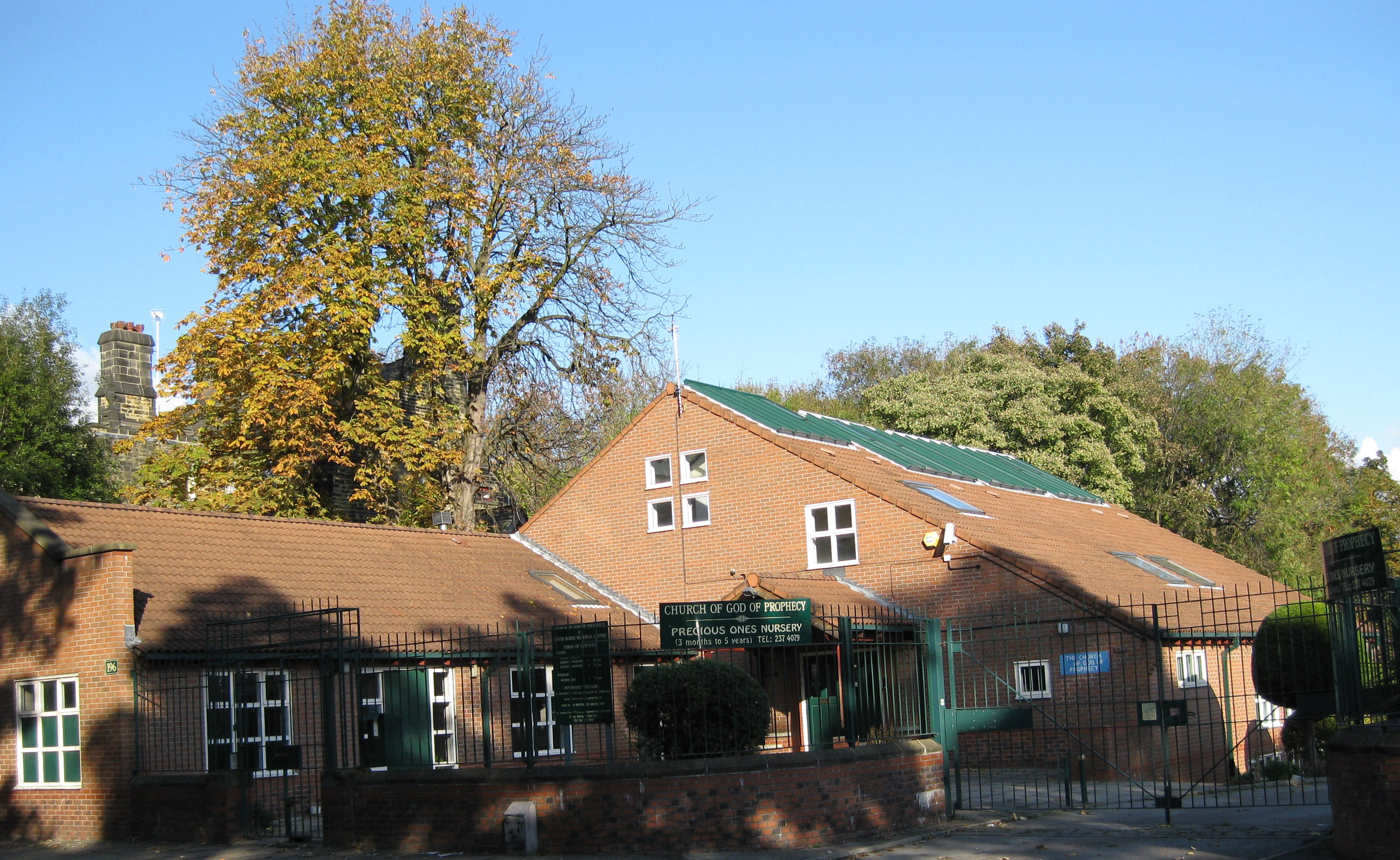
Church of God of Prophecy

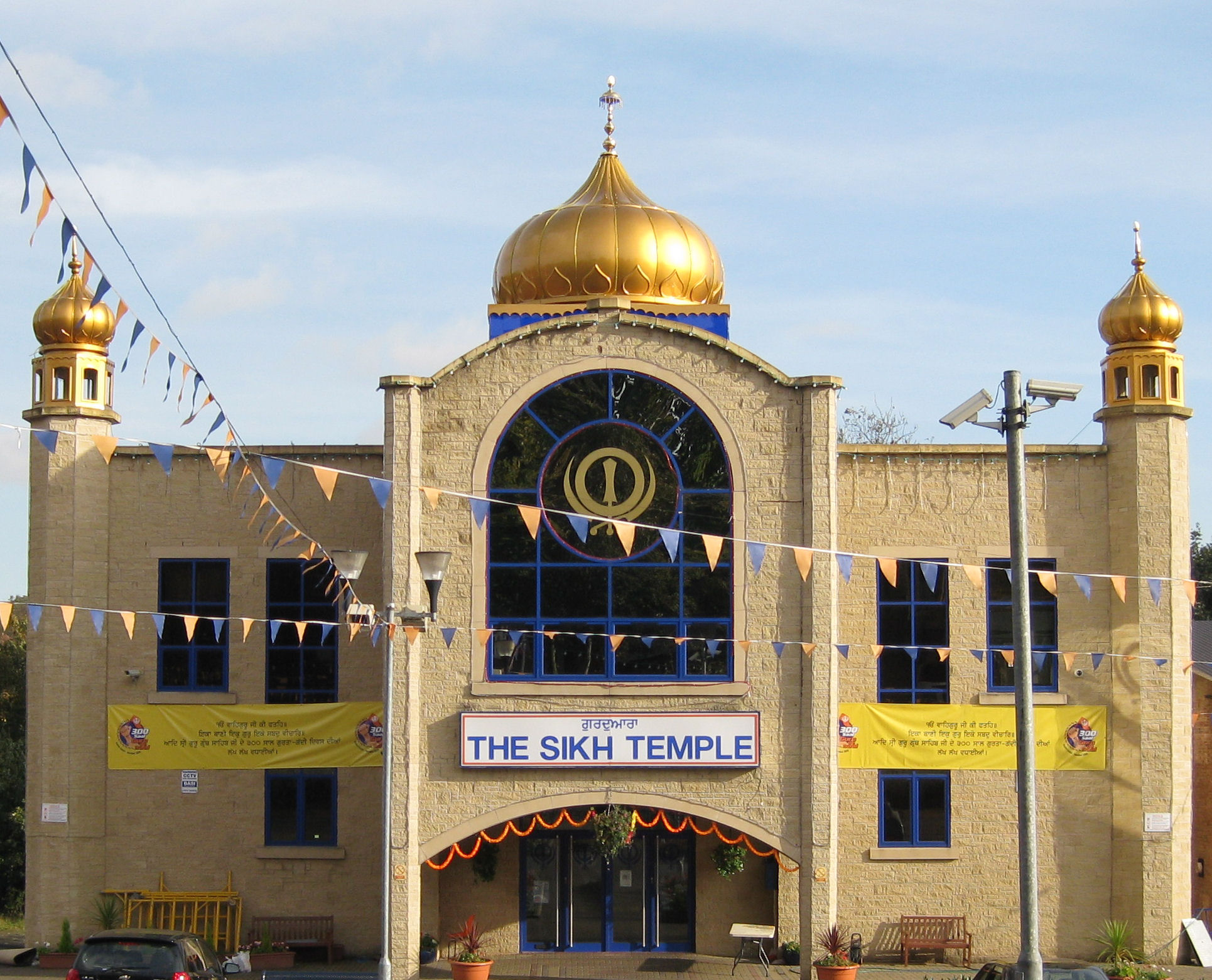
Sikh Temple

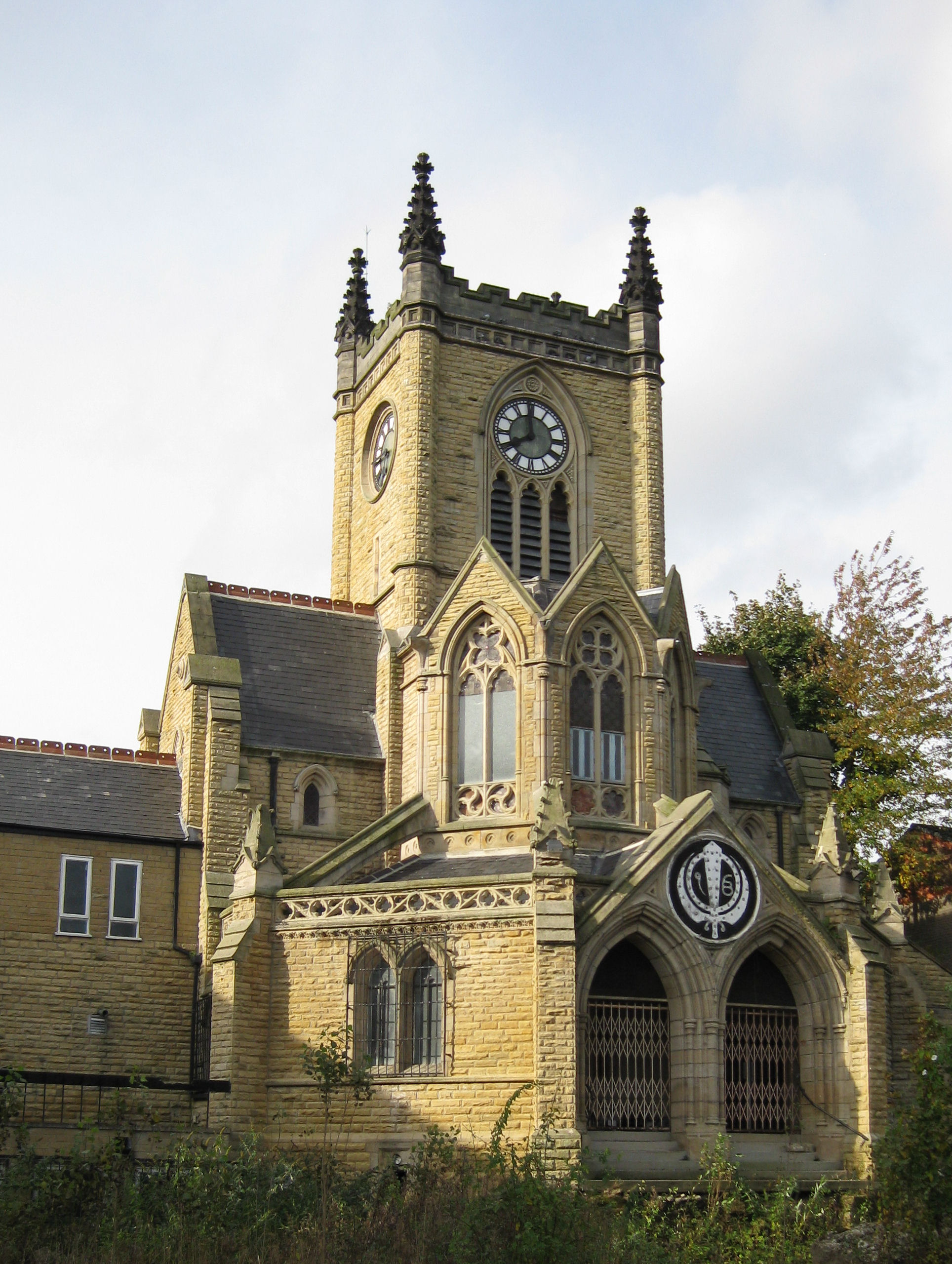
Former chapel, synagogue and temple

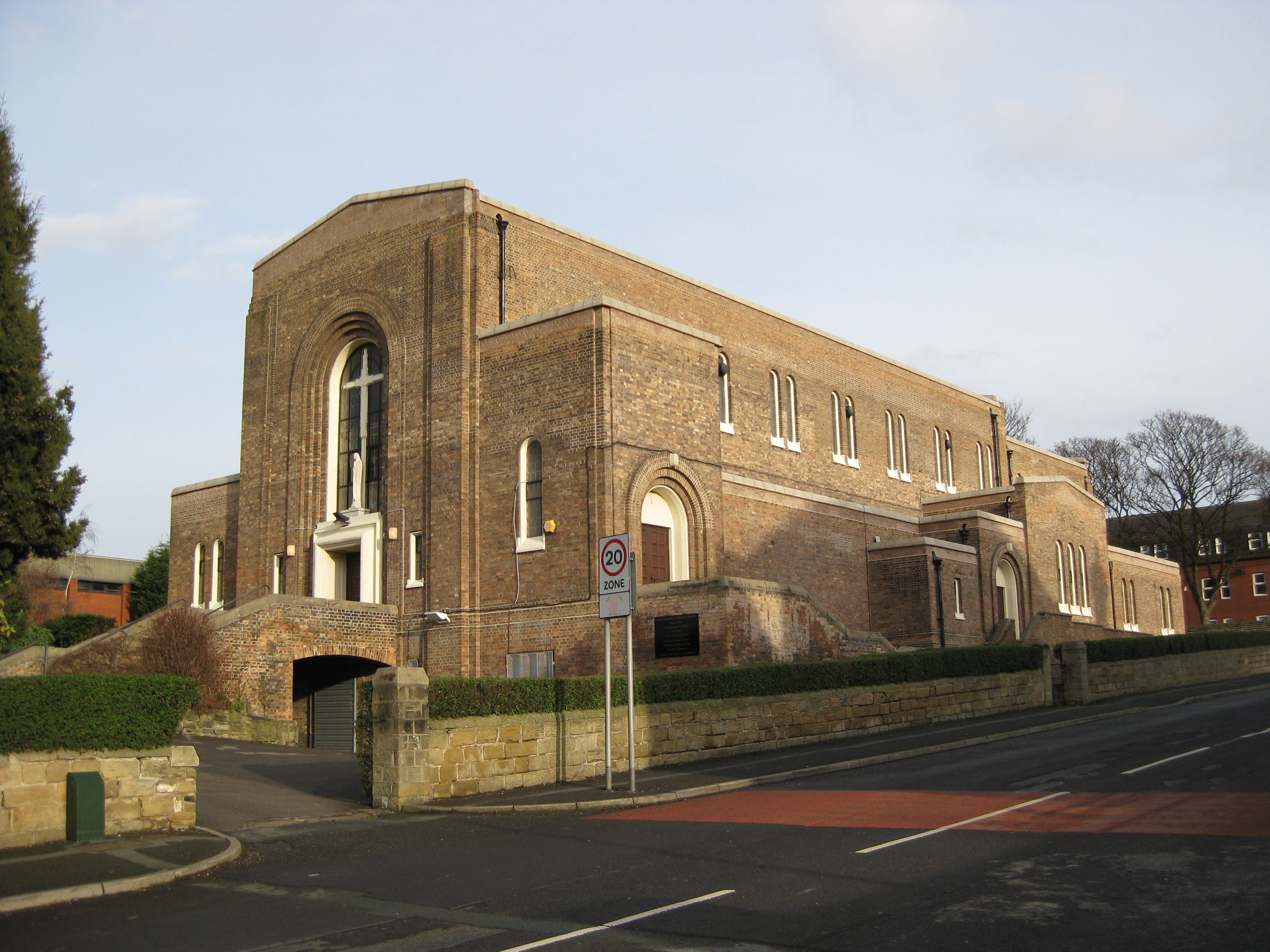
Holy Rosary Roman Catholic Church

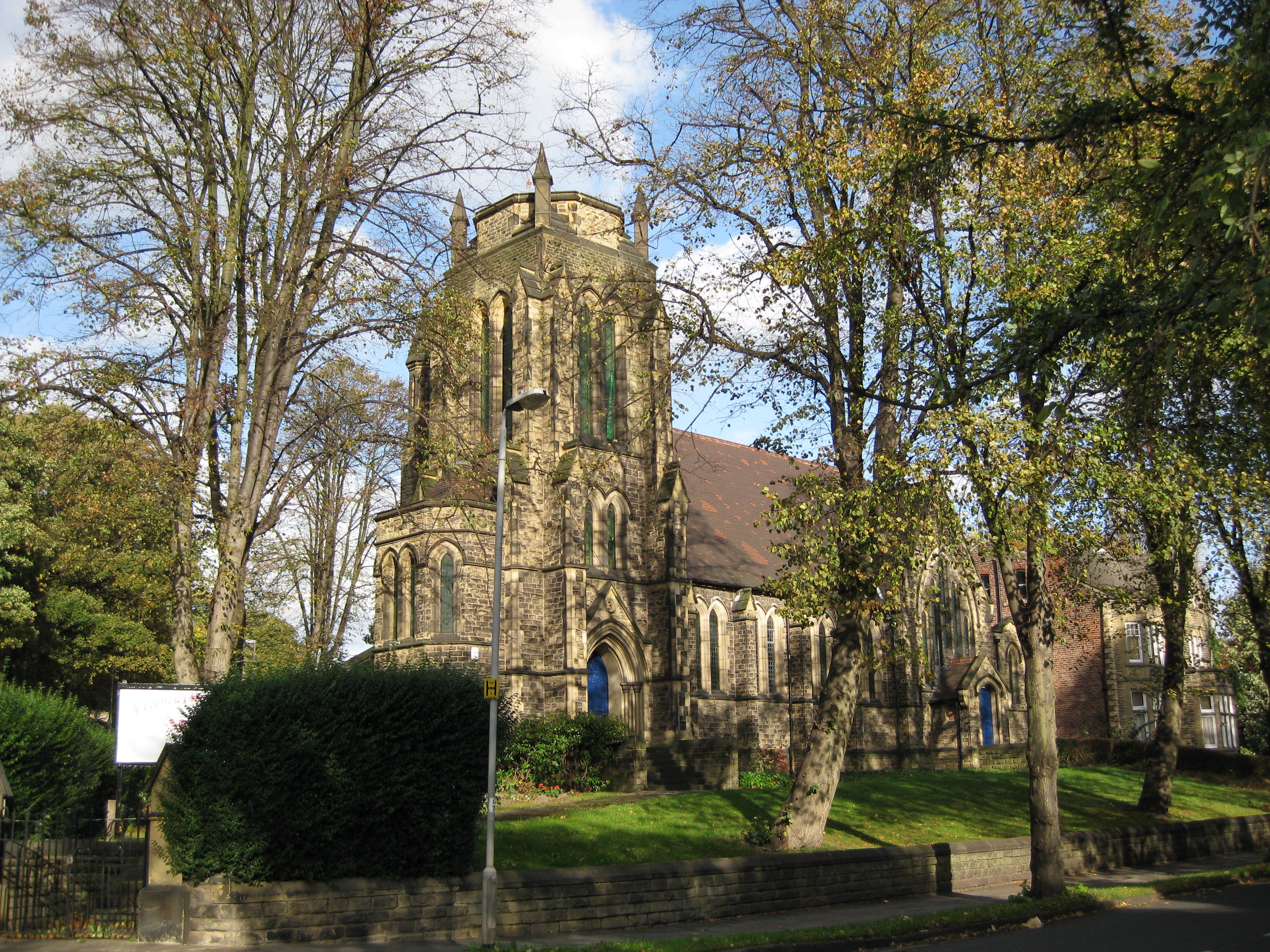
Chapeltown Community Church

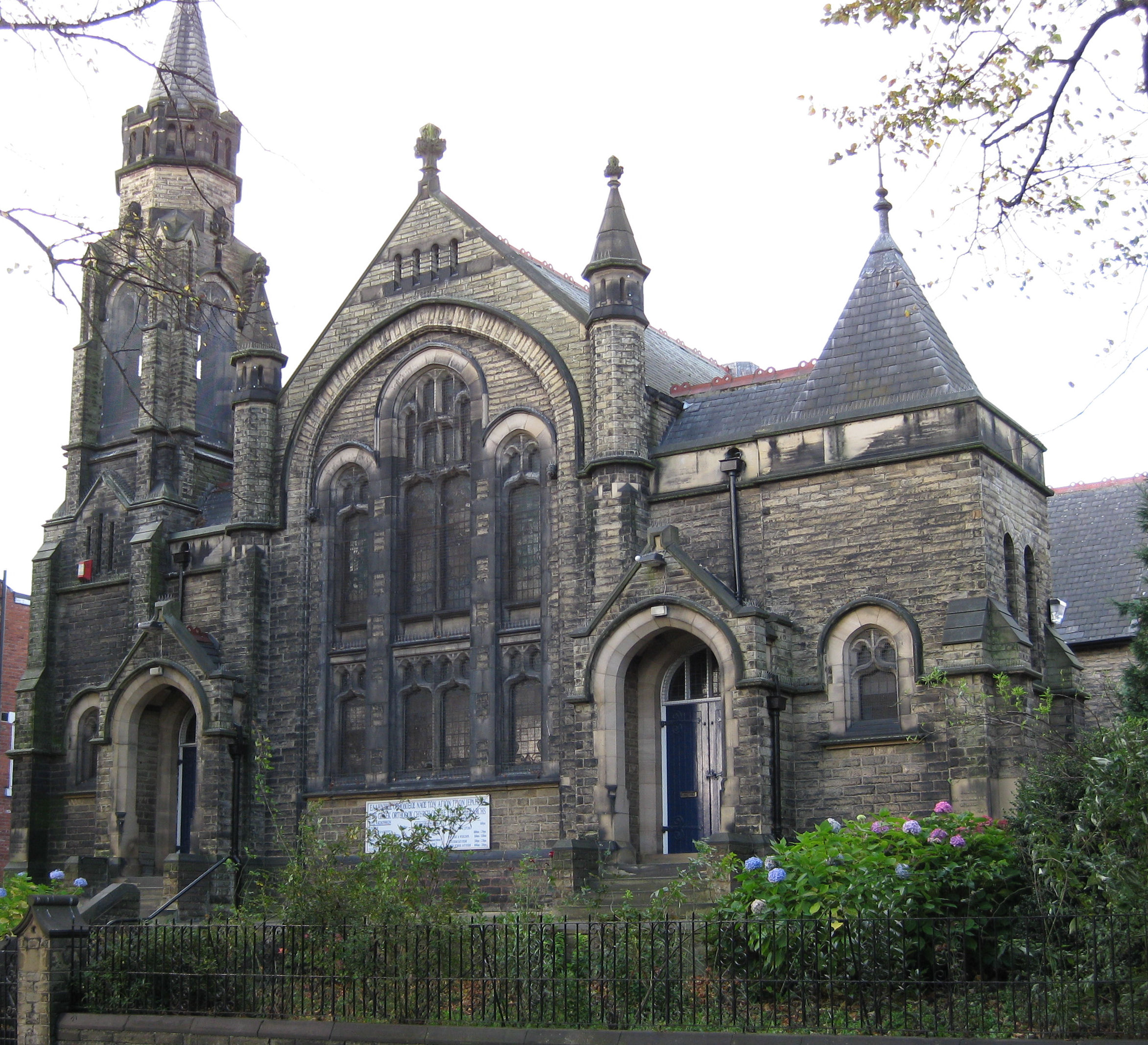
Three Hierarchs Greek Orthodox Church

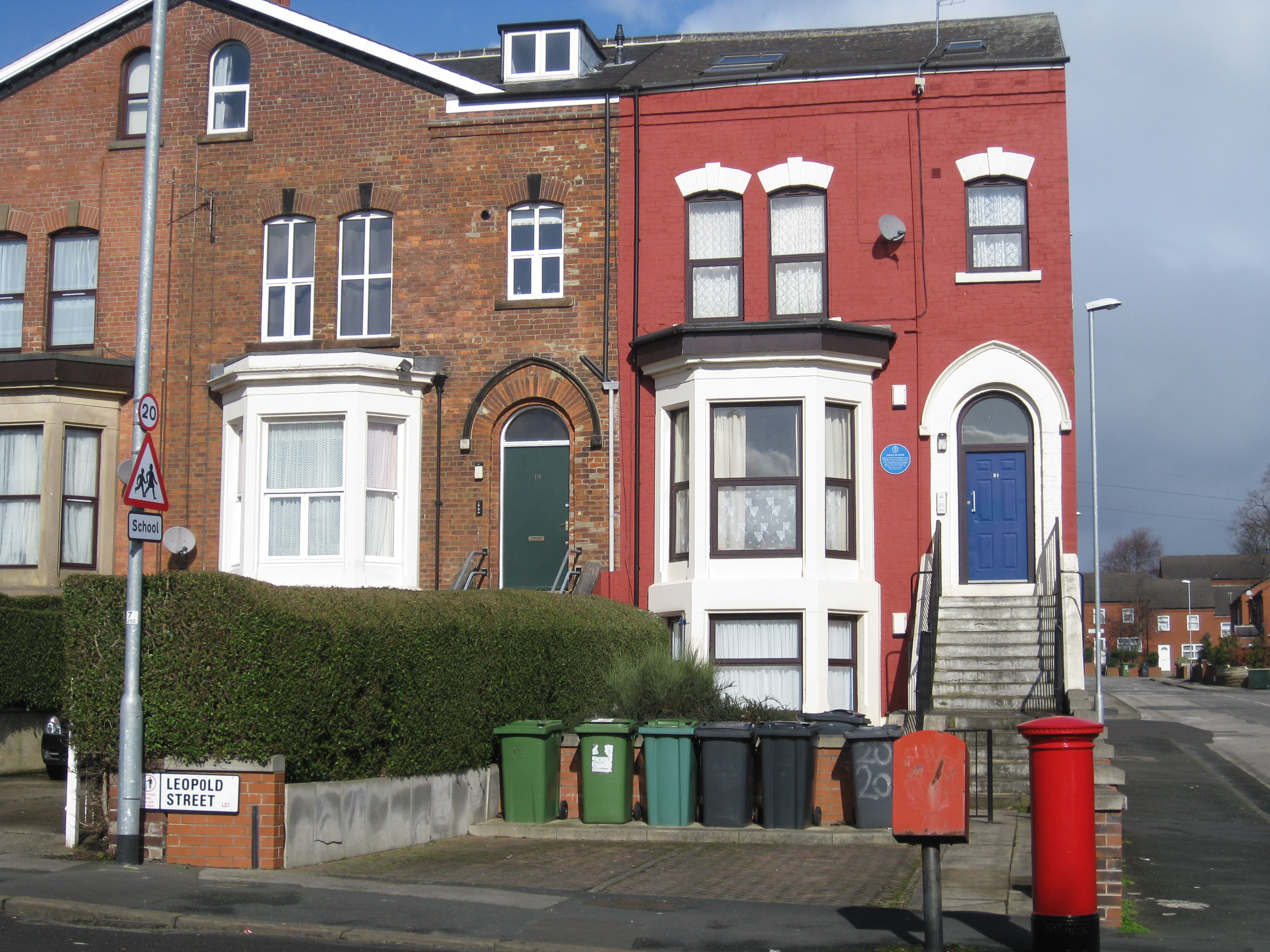
21 Leopold Street. A house then a synagogue then the first mosque in Leeds, now flats.

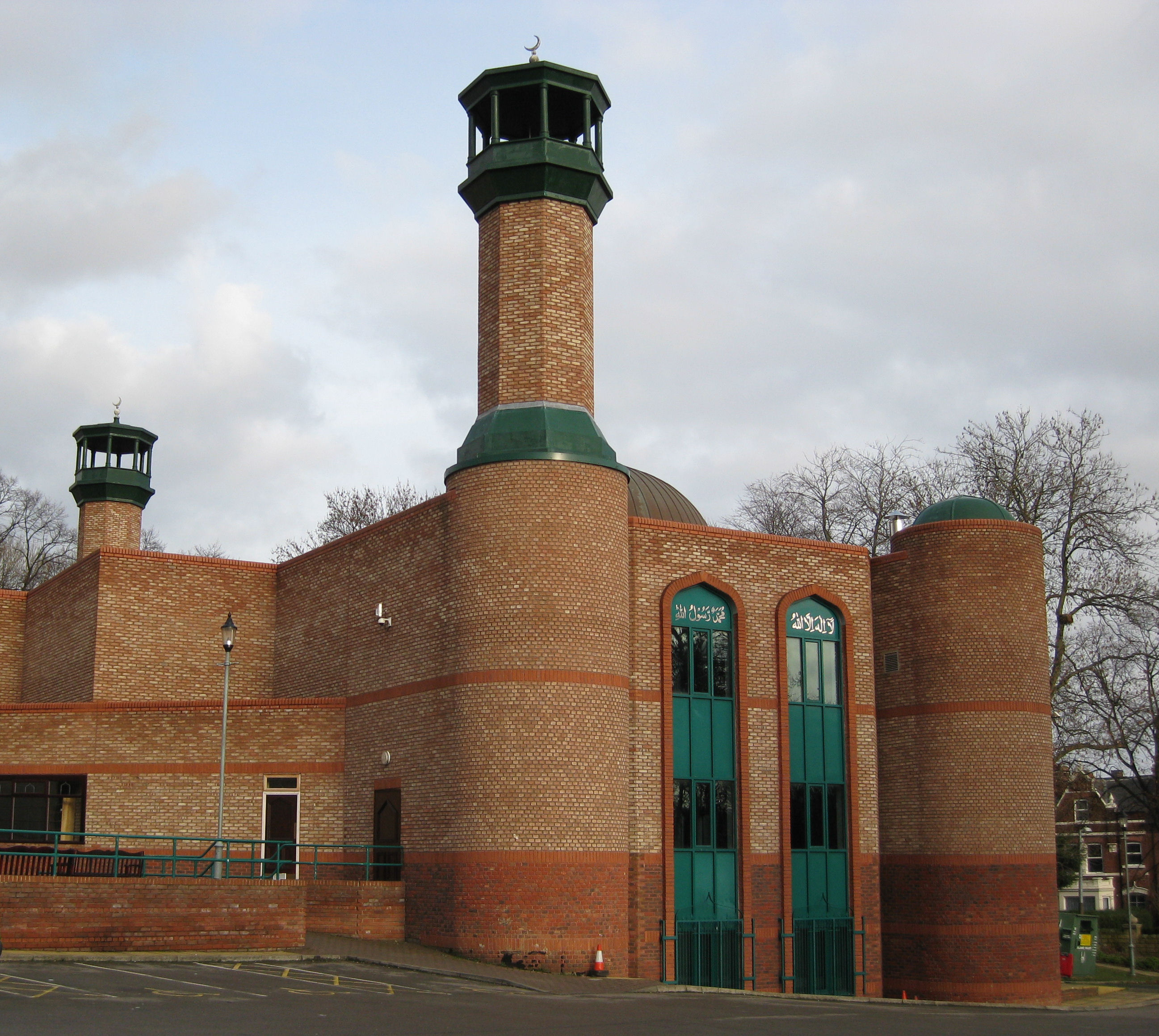
Leeds Jamia Mosque

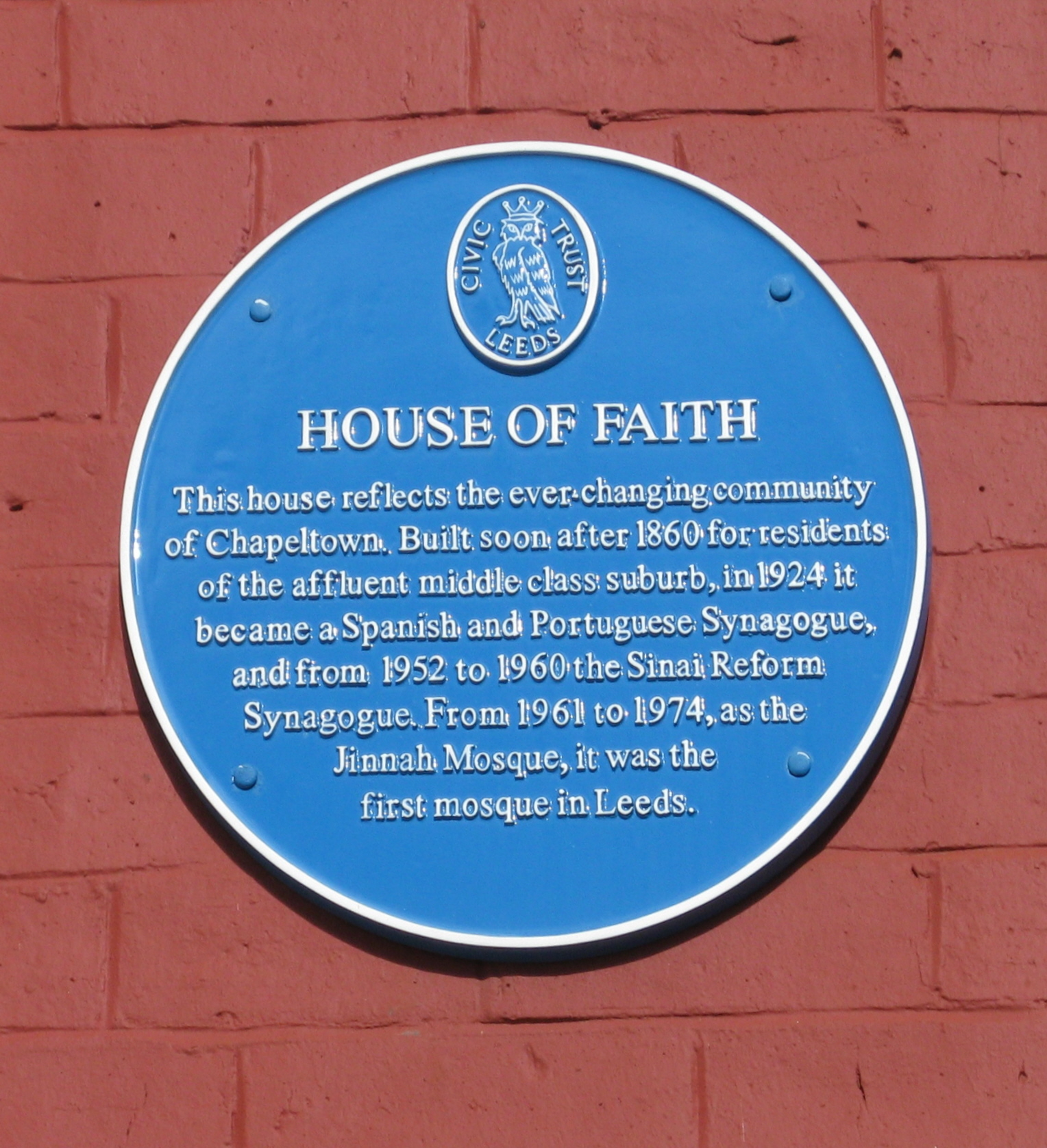
House of Faith Blue Plaque Leopold Street

== Notable residents of Chapeltown/Potternewton ==
- Frank Kidson (1855–1926), English folksong collector and music scholar, lived in Hamilton Avenue 1905–1926
- Edward Caldwell Spruce (1865–1923), sculptor, had a studio in Cowper Street
- Ellery Hanley MBE (born 1961), former Bradford Northern, Wigan, Balmain, Western Suburbs and Leeds Rugby League player and captain and later head coach of the Great Britain Rugby League team
- Brian Deane (born 1968), former footballer
- Olive Middleton née Lupton, great-grandmother of Catherine, Princess of Wales who grew up at Newton Park Estate, Leeds
- Aaron Lennon (born 1987), footballer
- Kulvinder Ghir (born 1965), actor and comedian
- Micah Richards (born 1988), footballer
- Andre Wisdom (born 1993), footballer
- Cedric Clarke - Leeds' first black councillor

== See also ==
- Chapeltown riots
- Listed buildings in Leeds (Chapel Allerton Ward)
