= Mabelreign, Harare =

Coordinates: 17°47′20″S 31°00′23″E

Mabelreign is a north-western suburb of Harare, the capital of Zimbabwe. There are a number of shopping centres in the area. The Mabelreign post office, Mabelreign Police Station, municipality offices, and a local clinic are located on Stortford parade in Mabelreign shopping centre. Secondary schools in the area include Ellis Robins School, Harare and the Mabelreign Girls High School. Hallingbury Primary School, Haig Park Primary and Alfred Beit School are also in the area.

Areas falling under the general administrative area of Mabelreign include Greencroft, Haig Park, Sunridge, Ashdown Park, Meyrick Park, St. Andrews Park, Sentosa, Cotswold Hills and Bloomingdale.

Neighbouring suburbs are Marlborough, Avondale and Belvedere.

== History ==
In 1892 Edward Walter Kermode claimed a farm and registered it as 'Spring Valley Range', later to become Mabelreign. He arrived in the country from the Isle of Man with the pioneer column as a personal servant of Archibald Calqhoun, the country's first administrator.

Shortly after registering the farm, in 1895, Kermode returned to the Isle of Man where he married.

Mabelreign was named after Miss Mabel Mann, who was a fiancée of a surveyor named Swatheral. Miss Mann laid claim to the land despite the fact that the title was already held.
