= Elaine Hugh-Jones =

Welsh pianist (1927–2021)

Elaine Hugh-Jones (14 June 1927 – 29 March 2021) was a Welsh pianist, music educator and composer. She was born in London and studied piano with Harold Craxton, Julian Isserlis and with Lennox Berkeley. After completing her studies, she took a position as an accompanist with the BBC, where she worked for 37 years. She also taught music at Malvern Girls' College.

== Works ==
Selected works include:

- A back view (in Eight Cornford Songs) (Text: Frances Cornford)
- Bicker's Cottage (in Eight Cornford Songs) (Text: Frances Cornford)
- Echo (in Six de la Mare Songs) (Text: Walter de la Mare)
- Ghosts (in Six de la Mare Songs) (Text: Walter de la Mare)
- Night song (in Eight Cornford Songs) (Text: Frances Cornford)
- Silver (in Six de la Mare Songs) (Text: Walter de la Mare)
- The hare (in Six de la Mare Songs) (Text: Walter de la Mare)
- The madman and the child (in Eight Cornford Songs) (Text: Frances Cornford)
- The old woman at the flower show (in Eight Cornford Songs) (Text: Frances Cornford)
- The ride‑by‑nights (in Six de la Mare Songs) (Text: Walter de la Mare)
- The road to Coursegoules (in Eight Cornford Songs) (Text: Frances Cornford)
- The watch (in Eight Cornford Songs) (Text: Frances Cornford)
- To a young cat in the orchard (in Eight Cornford Songs) (Text: Frances Cornford)
- Winter (in Six de la Mare Songs) (Text: Walter de la Mare)

Hugh-Jones' songs were broadcast on BBC Radio 3 and have been recorded and released on CD, including:

- Poésie et musique au féminin (The Feminine in Poetry and Music) Audio CD (9 April 2002) Gallo, ASIN: B000063COE
- In Flanders Fields Audio CD (9 May 2006) Quartz, ASIN: B000E1P33Y

She has also been featured in British Music: Some Views of Richard Arnell; Bantock & Newman; Holst, Purcell & Morley College; Elaine Hugh – Jones; Tobias Matthay; Music in Birmingham: v. 29 by Paul Jackson and Roger Carpenter (Paperback – 31 Oct 2007) British Music Society, ISBN 978-1-870536-29-5
