= Eileen Reynolds =

British musician

Eileen Reynolds, FRAM, FRCM (1908-1991) was born in Westcliff-on-Sea, UK on 22 June 1908 and died in London on 21 May 1991. She was a musician and teacher, who founded the Rhodesian College of Music in 1948 and taught at the Royal College of Music in London.

Born Eileen Mary Kelly, she studied at the Royal Academy of Music under Harold Craxton and Douglas Cameron and later married RAF Wing Commander Crescens Reynolds. They moved to Rhodesia (now Zimbabwe) in 1937 when her husband was given the command of the Air Training Scheme in Salisbury. She opened the Rhodesian College of Music in 1948 with a loan of £100 and twenty-five students. It was the first establishment of its kind in Southern Rhodesia and opened by the Governor, Sir John Kennedy. By 1955, there were over two hundred students and the government of Rhodesia made more land available to the College on favourable terms. Reynolds held the post of Director of Studies till she left Rhodesia in September 1966.

On her return to England, she took up a professorship at the Royal College of Music, where she was elected a Fellow in 1976 and where she remained till her retirement in 1980. She continued to teach privately after her retirement.

Outside her musical activities (which as well as teaching included performing, coaching chamber music and adjudicating at music festivals), she was a qualified pilot and enjoyed driving sports cars.
