= Ellis Robins School =

Coordinates: 17.7822°S 31.0154°E

- Sherwood Drive, Mabelreign, Harare; Zimbabwe

Information
- Type: Public, Boarding
- Motto: Esse Quam Videri (Latin: Better To be, rather than to seem)
- Established: 1953
- Head of school: Mr MERO
- Grades: Form 1 to 6
- Campus type: Urban
- Houses: 4
- Colors: Blue & Gold
- Mascot: Dolphins
- Nickname: Fush
- Newspaper: The Robins Monitor
- Website: ellisrobins.ac.zw

Ellis Robins School is a Zimbabwean boys' high school that was founded in Harare, Zimbabwe in 1953. It is located in the suburb of Mabelreign in Harare (formerly Salisbury). Next door is Mabelreign Girls High School, the school's sister school. The Ellis Robins school colours are blue and gold, the badge has two dolphins facing each other, and the school Latin motto is "Esse Quam Videri" which means "To be, rather than to seem".

This motto comes from the family coat of arms of Sir Ellis Robins, who was Chairman of the British South Africa Company and the school is also named after him.

There was a government proposal in 2003 to rename all schools in Zimbabwe and Ellis Robins was scheduled to be called Leopold Takawira Boys High but overwhelming parental disapproval ensures that the original name is still used.

The school is one of the popular group A schools that participate in the Dairiboard Schools Rugby Festival which is held annually at Prince Edward School. Ellis Robins who are famously known as "FUSH", are fierce rivals with Allan Wilson High School with whom they compete with in various sporting disciplines. This rivalry is known to have existed since the colonial era.

== House system ==
Malcolm (boarders), Lawley, Newton, Abercorn

== Clubs and societies ==
The school has a variety of Clubs and Societies that are offered to the students to participate in. Many of these run throughout the academic year on all 3 terms.

- Drama
- Toastmasters
- Leo Club
- Debate
- Public Speaking
- Scripture Union
- Quiz & Current Affairs
- Zimbabwe United Nations Association (ZUNA)
- Conservation
- Shona Culture

== Sports ==
Sports at the school include Soccer, Rugby, Field Hockey, Table Tennis, Lawn Tennis, Chess, Cricket, Volleyball, Badminton, Basketball, Cross Country and Gymnastics.

== Old boys association (EROS) ==
The Old Boys Association (EROS) is an association for the alumni that attended Ellis Robins School. The purpose is to maintain school traditions and reunite the Old Boys. Former students are able to contribute to their alma mater through the Old Boys Association which keeps a close working relationship with the school.

== Notable alumni ==
- Heidi Holland – Author and journalist
- Perez Livias Moyo - Public Health Researcher
- Grant Symmonds – First Class Cricketer
- John Linwood – ex-BBC Chief Technology Officer
- Abel Chimukoko – Zimbabwe long distance runner
- Carlprit – Rapper
- Roy Bennett (politician) (1957–2018), Zimbabwean politician
- Kevin Duers
- Pastor G – Gospel artist
- Winston Chitando (graduated 1981), Zimbabwe Minister of Mines, 2017–2019
- Bronson Gengezha (born 1981), sculptor
- Albert Alan Owen – composer
- Youngson Mtk – Rapper
