= Chapeltown riots =

The Chapeltown riots can refer to three different riots in the area of Chapeltown in Leeds. These being:

- 1975 Chapeltown riot
- 1981 Chapeltown riot
- 1987 Chapeltown riot
