= Chapeltown Barracks =

British military installation

- Leeds
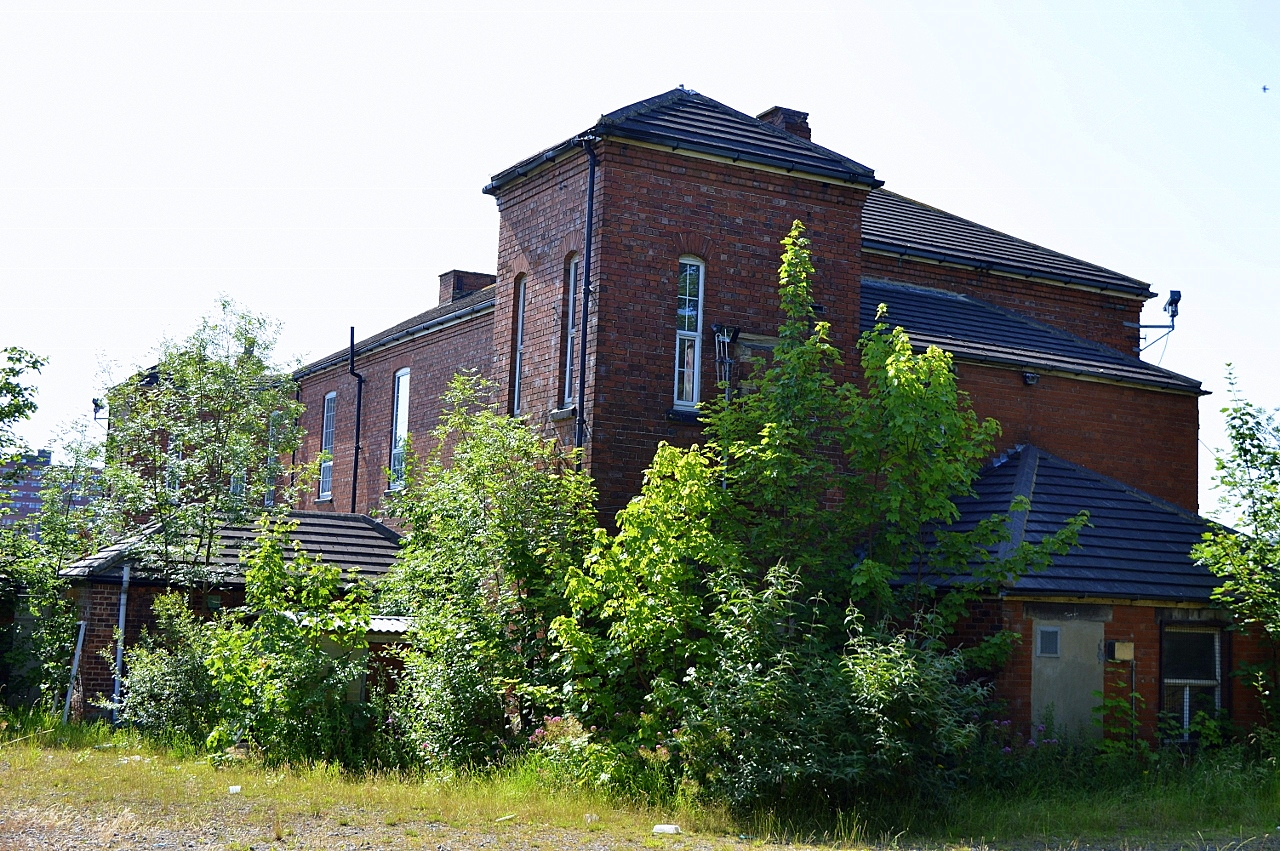
- Chapeltown Cavalry Barracks, Leeds

Site information
- Type: Barracks
- Owner: Ministry of Defence
- Operator: British Army

Location
- Location within West Yorkshire
- Coordinates: 53.811°N 1.527°W

Site history
- Built: 1820
- Built for: War Office
- In use: 1820-1988

Chapeltown Barracks was a military installation in Chapeltown, Leeds, England, situated on the north and south sides of Barrack Road.

== History ==
The barracks were constructed by Craven and Co. in 1820. They were largely used by cavalry regiments until the 1880s by which time they were in a poor state of repair. It was from about that time that the cavalry school was used by elements of the Leeds Rifles, a Volunteer Force regiment. The Leeds Rifles moved to the Army Reserve Centre at Harewood Barracks in 1967 and the barracks were largely demolished in 1988.
