= Alfred Edward Moffat =

Scottish composer (1863 - 1950)

- Born: 4 December 1863; Edinburgh, Scotland
- Died: 6 June 1950 (aged 86); Fulham, London, England
- Occupation(s): Musician, Composer, Collector

Alfred Edward Moffat (1863–1950) was a Scottish musician, composer and collector of music. He was born in Edinburgh on 4 December 1863. His father was John Moffat, a photographer, and his mother was Sophia Maria Knott.

He was educated at Edinburgh Collegiate School in 27-28 Charlotte Square, Edinburgh. Moffat studied musical composition in Berlin for five years under Ludwig Bussler. He remained in Berlin for another six years writing for German music publishing firms. He returned to London in the late 1890s, and devoted himself to the rediscovery of British violin players of the late 18th century and earlier. Most significantly, he edited the Schott's Kammersonaten [Chamber Sonata] series, and instigated Novello's Old English Violin Music series. He was also a Member of the Court of Assistants of the Royal Society of Musicians. He died in Fulham, London on 6 June 1950 aged 86.

== Musical Compositions ==
- Abendlied. Violin and piano. (Arranged by A. Moffat.) Author: Edward German 1862–1936. Contributor: Alfred Moffat. London : A. Lengnick & Co, [1914]
- Cherry ripe. Two-part Song. Arranged by A. Moffat. Author: Charles Edward Horn. Contributor: Alfred Moffat. A Collection of Two-Part Songs for Treble Voices, etc. Fourth series. London : J. Williams, 1920.
- 4 Sonaten. Für Violoncello mit Klavierbegleitung bearbeitet von A. Moffat. [Violoncello parts revised by] W. E. Whitehouse. [Scores and parts.] Author: Benedetto Marcello 1686–1739. Contributors: Alfred Moffat; W. E Whitehouse (William Edward), 1859–1935. Mainz, etc.: B. Schott's Söhne, [c. 1920]
- Jig and Saraband. [Keyboard] Arranged by H. Craxton and A. Moffat. Author: Matthew Dubourg 1703–1767. Contributors: Harold Craxton arranger; Alfred Edward Moffat arranger. Series: Craxton-Moffat collection of old keyboard music. London: Cramer, c1930.

== Musical Collections ==
- Meisterschule der Alten Zeit. Comprising 42 violin sonatas, 18 violoncello sonatas, 22 trio sonatas, and contains sonatas by previously unknown 18th century English composers for the violin;
- 4 trio sonatas by Purcell (g minor), Handel and Leclair (2);
- Kammersonaten, 35 violin sonatas;
- Old English Violin Music;
- French Violin Music of the 18th century, 24 numbers;
- English Music of the 18th century, 35 numbers;
- Old Keyboard Music (with Harold Craxton);
- Volumes of folk songs, each containing 200 songs with piano accompaniment:

Minstrelsy of England, Minstrelsy of Scotland, Minstrelsy of Ireland, Minstrelsy of Wales, Minstrelsy of the Scottish Highlands (with Gaelic and English words), Songs of the Georgian Period, Characteristic Songs and Dances of all Nations (with J.D. Brown), A Garland of English Folk Songs, Folk Songs of the North Countrie (the last two with Frank Kidson), English Peasant Songs (with Ethel Kidson);

- Melodious Scotland, 18 numbers;
- Old Master Songs;
- Many arrangements of songs, duets etc., by Purcell.
