= Bronson Gengezha =

Zimbabwean sculptor (born 1981)

- Born: April 21, 1981 (age 44); Zimbabwe
- Known for: Sculpture
- Father: Temba Gengezha

Bronson Gengezha (born April 21, 1981) is a Zimbabwean sculptor.

== Background ==
A native of Dzivarasekwa, Gengezha attended Ellis Robins School where he took a special interest in art history. He credits his father, Temba Gengezha, as his greatest inspiration. From 1975 until his death in 2001, Temba Gengezha's sculptures were popular and celebrated both locally and abroad for their style and artistry.

As a child, Gengezha played with stones on the floor of his father's workshops, but it was not until 1998 that he began sculpting and honing his artistic vision under the tutelage of his father. Gengezha's inherent creativity is evident in the skill, originality and attention to detail, which is characteristic of his work. He credits Chituwa Jemali and Dominic Benhura as largely influential in his decision to maintain a unique and distinctive style of Shona art. Gengezha has collaborated with many noted Zimbabwean sculptors through his connection to Chapungu Sculpture Park. Gengezha is most often inspired by nature, everyday life in Zimbabwe, and the bonds of family. Gengezha's pieces can be found in galleries and private collections throughout Germany, Canada, Australia, the Netherlands, Japan, South Africa, and the United States. He continues to be recognized for his work with Kwekwe serpentine and lepidolite.
