= Alfred Beit School =

Coordinates: 17.787916°S 31.001254°E

Location
- Mabelreign in Harare Zimbabwe. Zimbabwe

Alfred Beit School is a primary school in the suburb of Mabelreign in Harare Zimbabwe. The school was named after Alfred Beit. The school offers education from the ECD grade all the way up to grade 7. Alfred Beit has a house system which is mainly used for sports. There are four houses, which are sable, eland, roan and kudu.

== Notable alumni ==
- Petina Gappah - writer
- Albert Alan Owen - composer
- Grant Symmonds - Currie Cup cricketer
