= Harold Craxton =

English pianist, teacher and composer (1885–1971)

Thomas Harold Hunt Craxton OBE (30 April 1885 – 30 March 1971) was an English pianist, teacher and composer.

== Early life ==
Born in London, and growing up in Devizes, Craxton began studying piano with Tobias Matthay and Cuthbert Whitemore in 1907.

== Career ==
Craxton made a name for himself early in his career as an accompanist, touring for two years with Emma Albani and twelve with Clara Butt, covering Europe, South Africa, America, Canada, the South Sea Islands, Australia and New Zealand. He also had long associations with Nellie Melba, Lionel Tertis, Jacques Thibaud, Elena Gerhardt and John McCormack.

In 1919 Craxton became a professor at the Royal Academy of Music. He remained there until 1961, although he continued teaching from his studio long into his later years. Some notable students included Winifred Atwell, Joyce Howard Barrell, Susan Bradshaw, Howard Brown, Mary Chandler, Elaine Hugh-Jones, Peter Katin, Alexander Kelly, Denis Matthews, Noel Mewton-Wood, Hamish Milne, Albert Alan Owen, Patrick Piggott, Alan Richardson, and Thorunn Tryggvason (later Ashkenazy).

Craxton was also an active composer. His first published work was "Three Pieces for Pianoforte" (1911). Some of his songs were recorded by John McCormack and Lauritz Melchior. He also collected musical compositions in association with Alfred Edward Moffat. Working with Donald Tovey between 1926 and 1931 he completed an edition of the complete Beethoven piano sonatas which was published by the Associated Board of the Royal Schools of Music and has remained in print ever since.

== Personal life ==
Craxton and his wife Essie had one daughter and five sons, including the artist John Craxton, the BBC Television producer Anthony Craxton and the distinguished oboist Janet Craxton.
