= Frank Kidson =

English music scholar (1855–1926)

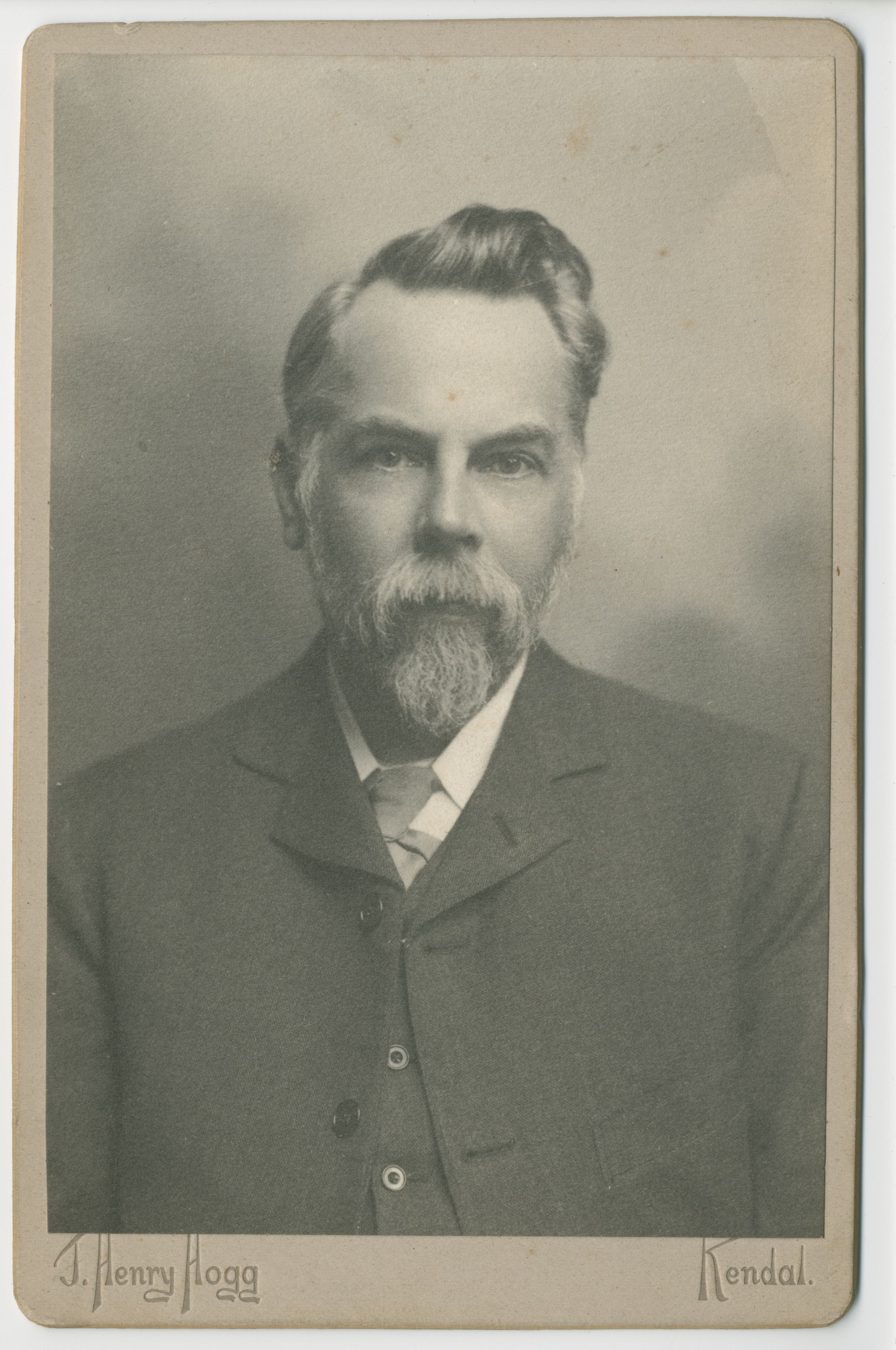
- Frank Kidson
- Born: 15 November 1855; Leeds, England
- Died: 7 November 1926 (aged 70)
- Occupations: Folk Song Collector, Antiquarian, Author
- Known for: Folk music collecting

Frank Kidson (15 November 1855 – 7 November 1926) was an English folksong collector and music scholar.

== Career ==
He was born in Leeds, where he lived for most of his life. He worked briefly with his brother in an antique business, then turned to landscape painting, for which he travelled widely, which gave him the opportunity to get to know local music. He was interested both in living folk music, which he gathered with the help of his niece Emma Mary Kidson (whom he called Ethel), and in the printed remains of popular music, which he collected and on which he was recognised as the leading authority of his day. His early work on folk music, published in Old English Country Dances (1890) and Traditional Tunes: A collection of ballad airs (1891) gave impetus to a rising interest in the subject. He was one of the founders of the Folk-Song Society in 1898 and guided its publications with his knowledge of early ballad literature. English folk-song and dance by Frank Kidson and Mary Neal was published in 1915.

Other aspects of the developing folksong revival were less welcome to him, in particular Cecil Sharp's enthusiasm for institutionalising folk music and dance in education. He published one further book of folk music A Garland of English Folk-Songs (1926); and after his death, on 7 November 1926, Ethel Kidson edited two further books from his collections, Folk Songs of the North Countrie (1927) and English Peasant Songs (1929). In these collections, they worked in association with Alfred Edward Moffat.

He also worked on other aspects of musical history, writing British Music Publishers, Printers and Engravers (1900) and The Beggar's Opera: Its Predecessors and Successors (1922), and contributing many articles to the Grove Dictionary of Music and Musicians.

A large part of his personal collection, including thirteen folio volumes of broadsides, was acquired at auction on his death by the Mitchell Library.
