= Chapel Allerton =

Suburb of Leeds in West Yorkshire, England

Coordinates: 53.835888°N 1.540071°W

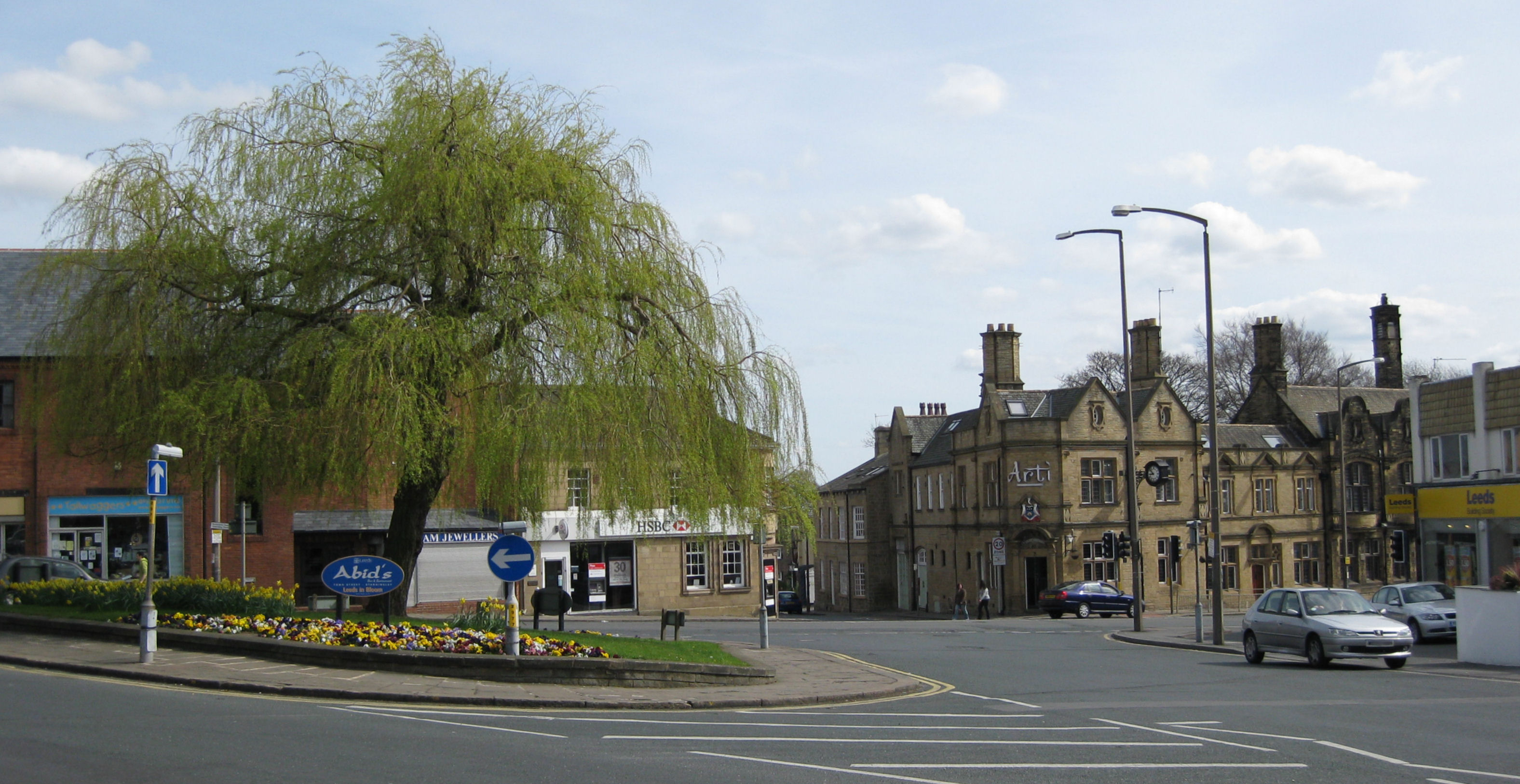
- Stainbeck Corner, the effective centre

- Location within West Yorkshire
- Population: 23,536 (Ward. 2011)
- OS grid reference: SE303378
- Metropolitan borough: City of Leeds
- Metropolitan county: West Yorkshire
- Region: Yorkshire and the Humber
- Country: England
- Sovereign state: United Kingdom
- Post town: LEEDS
- Postcode district: LS7
- Dialling code: 0113
- Police: West Yorkshire
- Fire: West Yorkshire
- Ambulance: Yorkshire
- UK Parliament: Leeds North East

Chapel Allerton is an inner suburb of north-east Leeds, West Yorkshire, England, 2 miles (3.2 km) from the city centre.

It sits within the Chapel Allerton ward of Leeds City Council and had a population of 18,206 and 23,536 at the 2001 and 2011 census respectively. The area was also listed in the 2018 Sunday Times report on Best Places to Live in northern England.

== Location ==
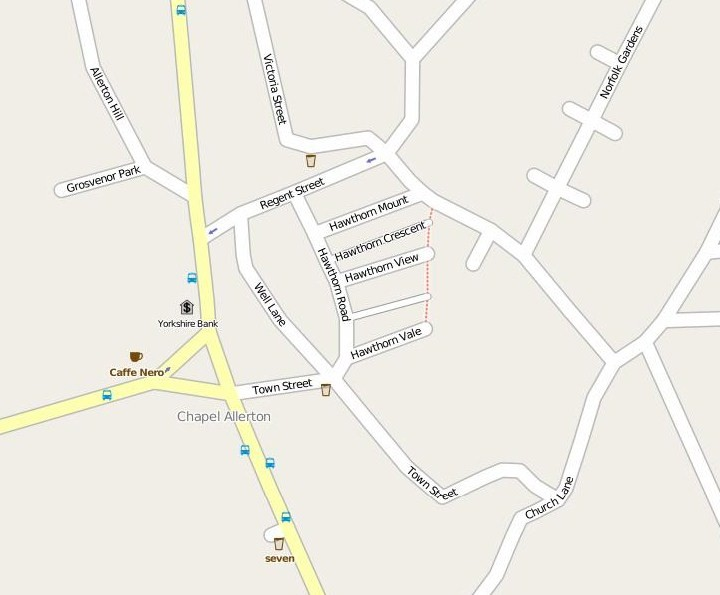
Central Chapel Allerton street map

The region within the Chapel Allerton ward generally considered to be Chapel Allerton is bounded by Potternewton Lane to the south, Scott Hall Road to the west and Gledhow Valley Road to the north-east.

Surrounding districts include Moortown, Meanwood, Roundhay, Gledhow, Chapeltown and Harehills. Chapel Allerton is on Harrogate Road, which, before the building of the A61 Scott Hall Road, was the main road from Leeds to Harrogate. The centre in terms of activity is Stainbeck Corner, at the junction of Stainbeck Lane, Harrogate Road and Town Street, which is also the key place on 19th century maps of the village.

== Name ==
The name Chapel Allerton is first attested in the Domesday Book simply as Alreton and similarly spelled variants. It probably comes from Old English alor 'alder' (in its genitive plural form alra) and tūn 'estate, farm', thus meaning 'Alder farm'.

The Chapel part of the name refers to a chapel associated with Kirkstall Abbey. This building was demolished in the eighteenth century; the site remains between Harrogate Road and Church Lane. Already in 1240 a charter referred to land "which lies between the road which goes to the Chapel of Allerton and the bounds of Stainbeck", but the name Chapel Alreton is first attested in the fourteenth century, coined to distinguish the place from the many other places called Allerton, such as the nearby Allerton Gledhow and Moor Allerton.

The name Chapel Allerton was reduced to Chapeltown (first attested in 1427), and from this time both names co-existed and were essentially interchangeable. Ralph Thoresby, writing in 1715, records Chapel-Town as a common name for the township of Chapel Allerton, describing it as "well situated in pure Air, upon a pleasant Ascent, which affords a Prospect of the Country ten or twelve miles". The open space to its east and north of Potter-Newton was "a delicate Green commonly call'd Chapel-Town Moor".

== History ==
Before the Norman Conquest (1066–1072) it was a township covering about five square miles, including what are now known as Alwoodley, Meanwood, Buslingthorpe, Scott Hall, Gledhow, Carr Manor, Moortown and Moor Allerton. This included a major and a minor Roman road, and a Roman altar was discovered in the foundations of the Sexton's cottage for the old Church of St Matthew when it was demolished in 1880.

This area was substantially destroyed by William the Conqueror in what was known as the Harrying of the North, leaving only the remnants of a village with a church around the present-day centre. This is shown by the reduction in value from 40 to 2 shillings in the Domesday Book (1086). The entry reads:

... In Alreton, Glunier had six carucates of land to be taxed, and there may be three ploughs there. Ilbert now has it, and it is waste. Value in King Edward's time forty shillings, now two shillings. There is a church there and wood pasture half a mile long and a half broad.

William awarded the area to the Lacy family, who later sold it to Simon de Alreton, who bestowed most of it to Kirkstall Abbey in 1152. The Abbey later sold much of it to the Mauleverer family of Potternewton. With the dissolution of the monasteries (1536–1541) Kirkstall Abbey and its estates were taken over by the crown, and Queen Elizabeth I sold the Lordship of Chapel Allerton to Thomas Killingbeck.

In medieval times, the area was mostly small farms, with a village (and chapel) centred on a crossroads. In 1645 there was a plague (probably cholera) in Leeds, particularly virulent around the town markets. Instead of travelling in to sell produce, the people from Chapel Allerton sold it at Chapeltown Green, at the north end of what is now Chapeltown Road. To pay, the buyer had to put money into a basin of vinegar, specially built into a wall.

Chapeltown Moor was an open area extending from Stainbeck Lane on the north down to Potternewton Lane on the south, bounded to the west by the stream known as Stain Beck and the turnpike road to Harrogate on the east. In the 17th and 18th centuries it had a racecourse and was also used for archery, cricket, foot racing, and cockfighting. It was finally enclosed between 1803 and 1813. In 1644 three men were hanged on a gallows there, roughly where the 1878 school is.

By the end of the 17th century, it had become a resort or second home for wealthy people from Leeds and in 1767 was described as the Montpellier of Yorkshire by one visitor. In 1834 Edward Parsons described it as "by far the most beautiful and respectable in the Parish of Leeds". An 1853 directory called Chapel Allerton "a neat and pleasant village" with the "beautiful hamlets" of Moor-Allerton, Meanwood and Gledhow and a population of 2497 within its chapelry, noting that "It has many handsome mansions and neat houses, mostly occupied by merchants &c. who have their places of business in Leeds. From 1839 there was a horse-drawn omnibus to Leeds, which was replaced by a horse tram in 1874, later by a steam tram and in 1901 an electric tram. The population rose from 1054 in 1801 to 4377 in 1898.

Allerton-Chapel was formerly a chapelry in the parish of Leeds, in 1866 Chapel Allerton became a separate civil parish, on 26 March 1904 the parish was abolished and merged with Leeds. In 1901 the parish had a population of 5841.

In 1900 it was still a village, isolated from Leeds and neighbouring Meanwood and Moortown by fields, which were gradually filled in with housing and new roads in the 20th century. First of all, rows of elegant stone-built houses along Chapeltown Road established a genteel suburbia, then in the thirties many large housing developments such as Carr Manor, Stainburn and Scott Hall meant that the isolated village was just another urban suburb.

== Architecture ==
A large part of Chapel Allerton is a conservation area for the character and historical interest of its buildings, noted for a diversity of good quality domestic buildings from various periods. The historic core is around Stainbeck Corner, particularly around Town Street and Well Lane, with 8 Listed buildings. To the south and west of this is an area of grand detached houses with large gardens dating from the 18th and early 19th century. The earlier buildings are of fine-grained sandstone derived from the quarries which were once on Stainbeck Lane. These include a number of small 19th century two-storey houses as well as grander buildings. After 1890 brick terraced and back-to-back houses were built, but of better quality than workers' housing elsewhere in Leeds, as they were intended for artisans and the lower middle class. The advent of the electric tram in 1901 made the area more accessible and further housing began to fill in empty spaces though this was of varied types. It finally lost its village character in the 1920s and it joined the Leeds urban area. Thus the area between King George Avenue and Montreal Avenue was filled in between 1920 and 1939 with bungalows and stucco-faced houses typical of Leeds of the time. In Riviera Gardens, white rendered houses were built in the Modernistic style.

Dominion Cinema

After the Second World War further building and rebuilding continued, mostly unremarkable, though with a few examples of good modern design. The area was once home to an art deco cinema, the Dominion. Opened in 1934 and lasting only until 1967 when it operated as a bingo hall until the later part of the 1990, the cinema stood on Montreal Avenue. The residential street 'Dominion Close' is close to its former site.

=== Houses ===
Allerton Hall was situated between Wensley Drive and Stainbeck Lane. In 1755 it was purchased by Josiah Oates, a merchant and an ancestor of Captain Laurence Edward Oates who perished in a blizzard at the age of 32 on the Terra Nova Expedition to the Antarctic led by Robert Falcon Scott in 1912. A brass plaque commemorates him in Leeds Parish Church. Most of the 60 bed mansion has since been demolished. The remaining parts of Allerton Hall is a grade II listed building. In the 1950s, the building was used by Twentieth Century Fox for the distribution of films across the North of England. Gledhow Mount Mansion is situated at the top of Roxholme Grove and is a Grade II Listed early 19th Century country house, with well preserved interior. It was built by architect John Clark for Leeds industrialist John Hives, who also built nearby Gledhow Grove Mansion. Clough House on Stainbeck Lane was converted to the Mustard Pot pub in 1979. It may date to 1653, and thus one of the oldest inhabited houses in Leeds, though most of the structure is from 1700 onwards. On Wood Lane are Gothic style villas in sandstone dating from the second half of the 19th century for the middle classes. Methley Place is an example of late 19th century terraces for the artisan class. The Hawthorns are a set of terraces built in the early 1900s in an unusual Manorial style.

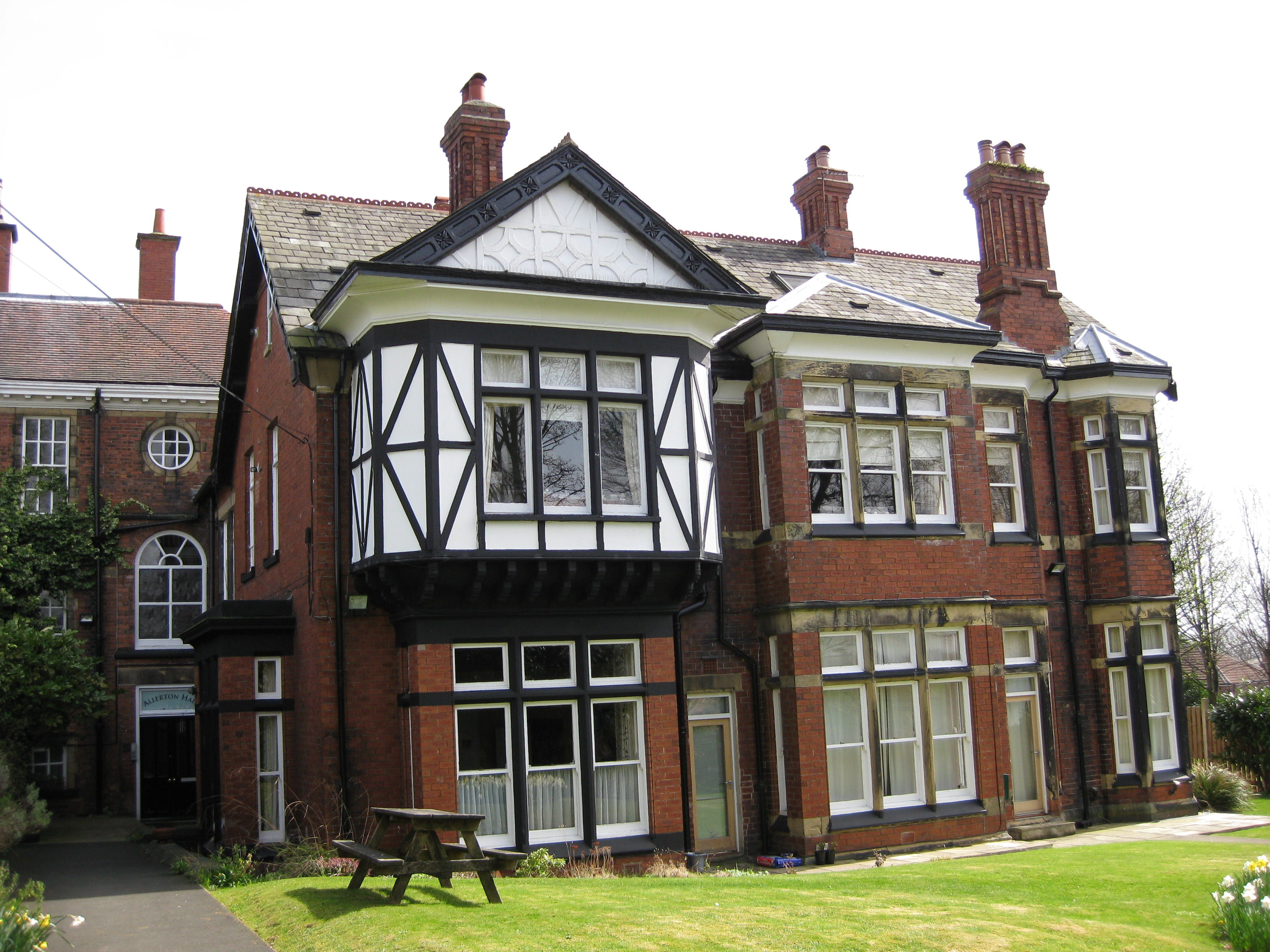
Allerton Hall from Wensley Drive

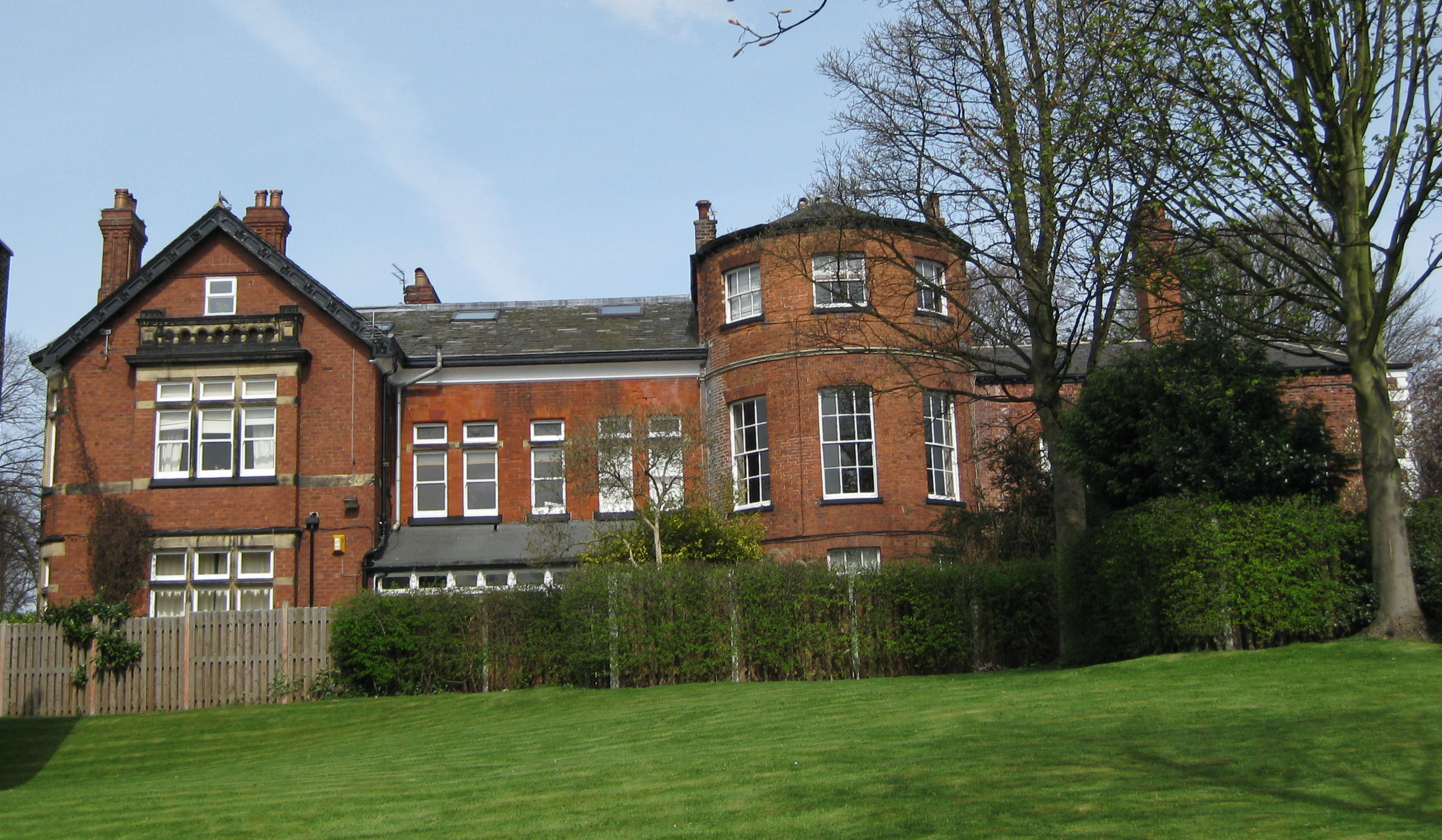
Allerton Hall from Stainbeck Lane

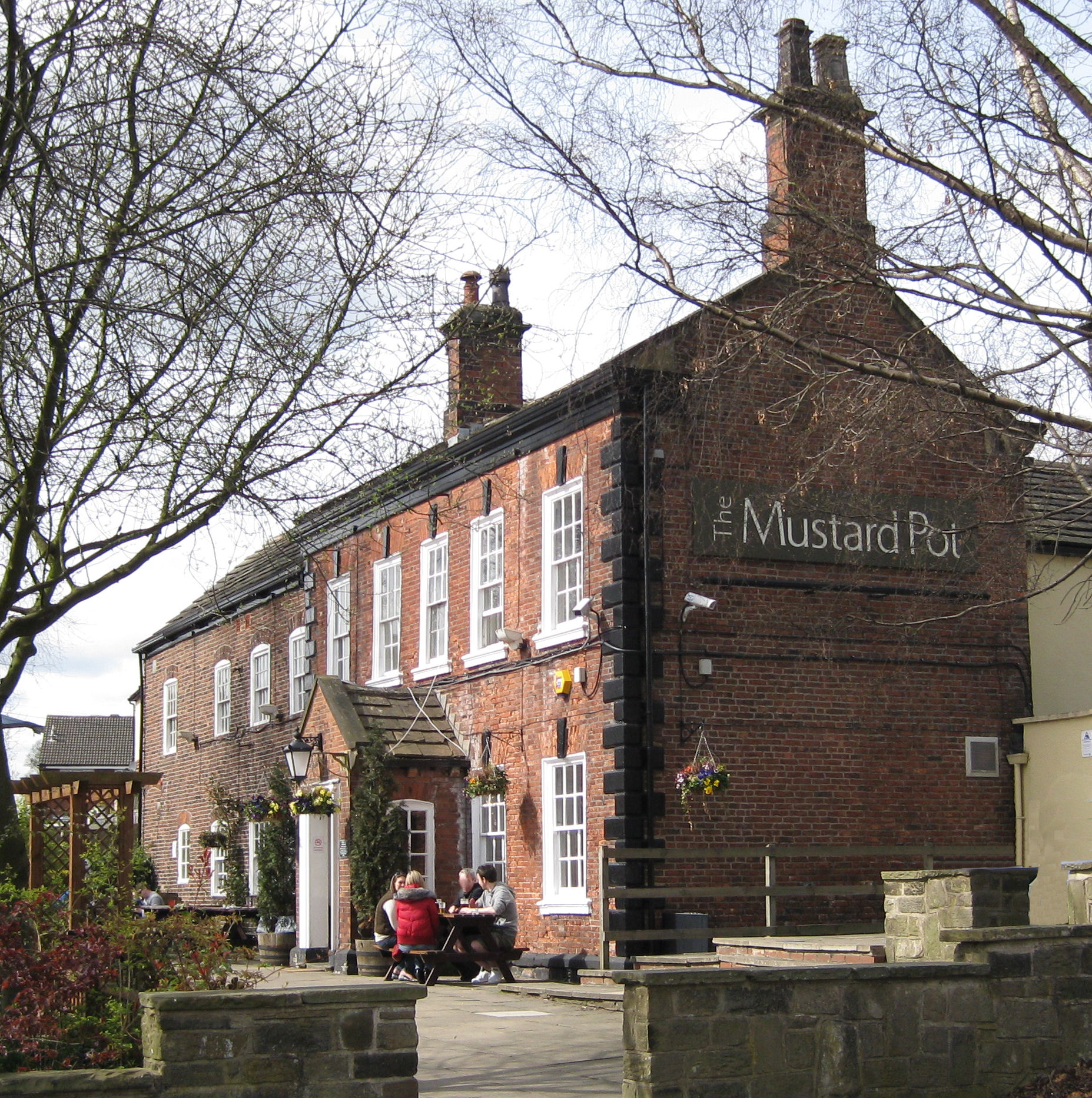
Clough House (The Mustard Pot)

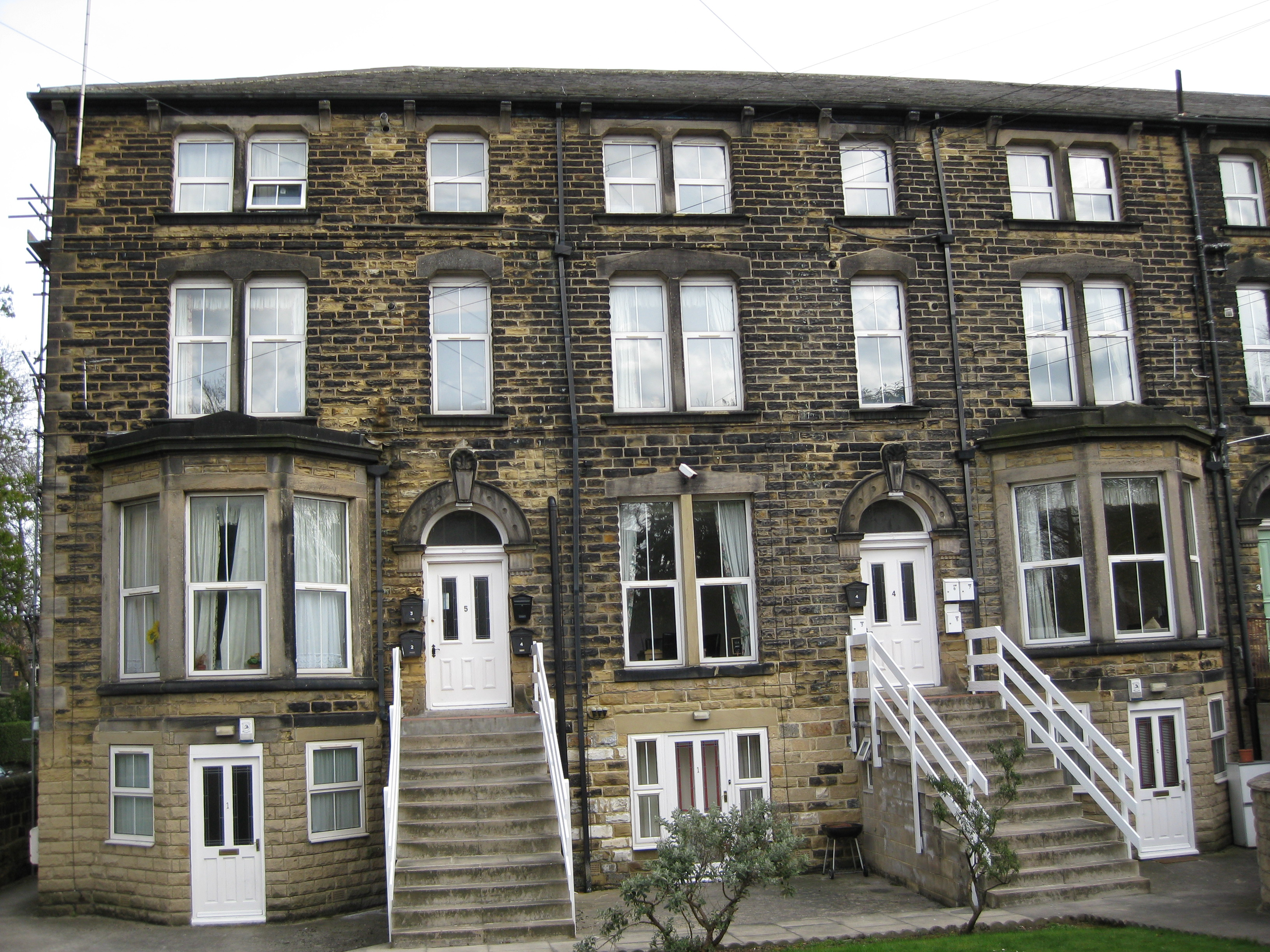
Houses on Wood Lane

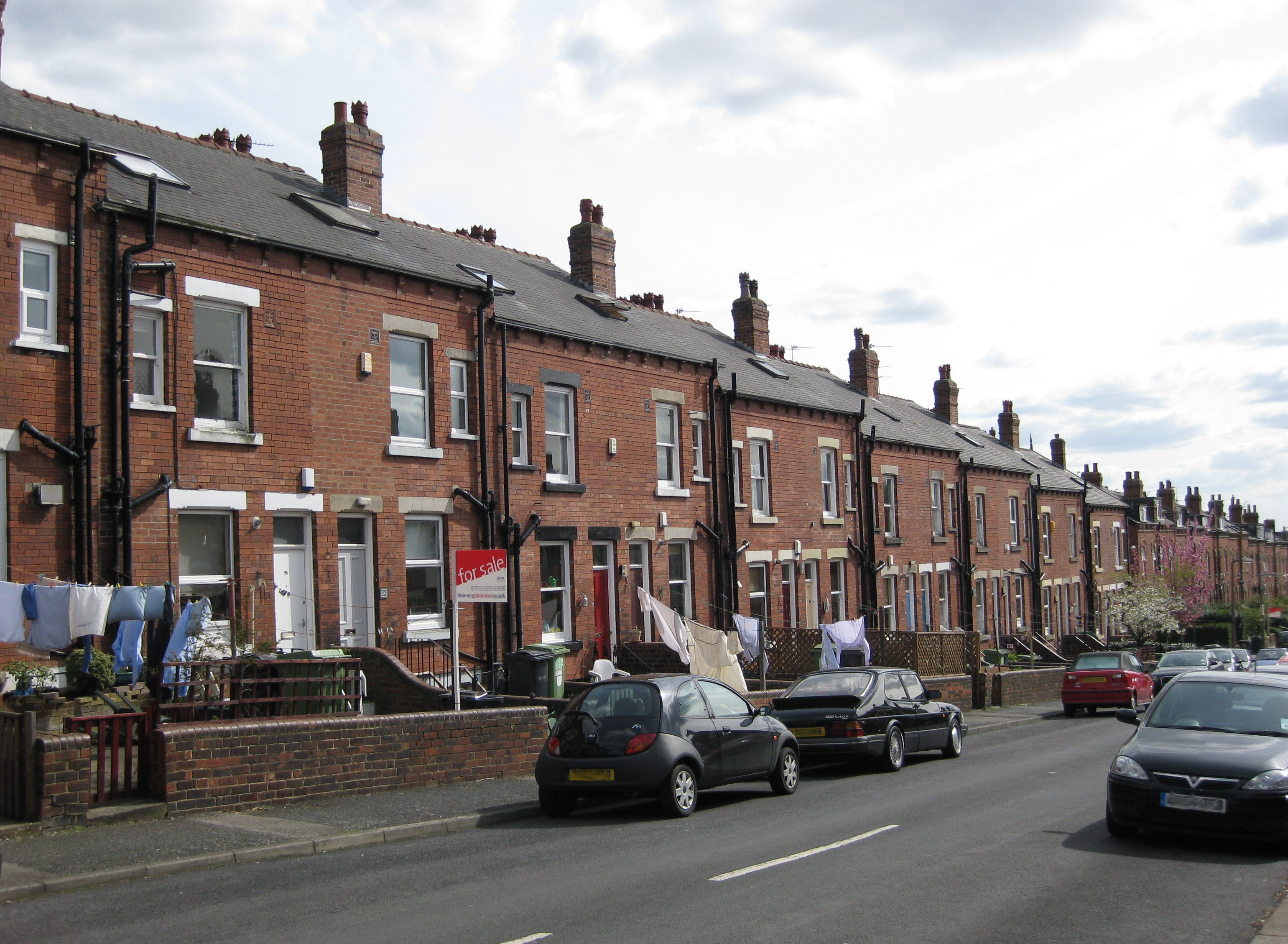
Methley Place

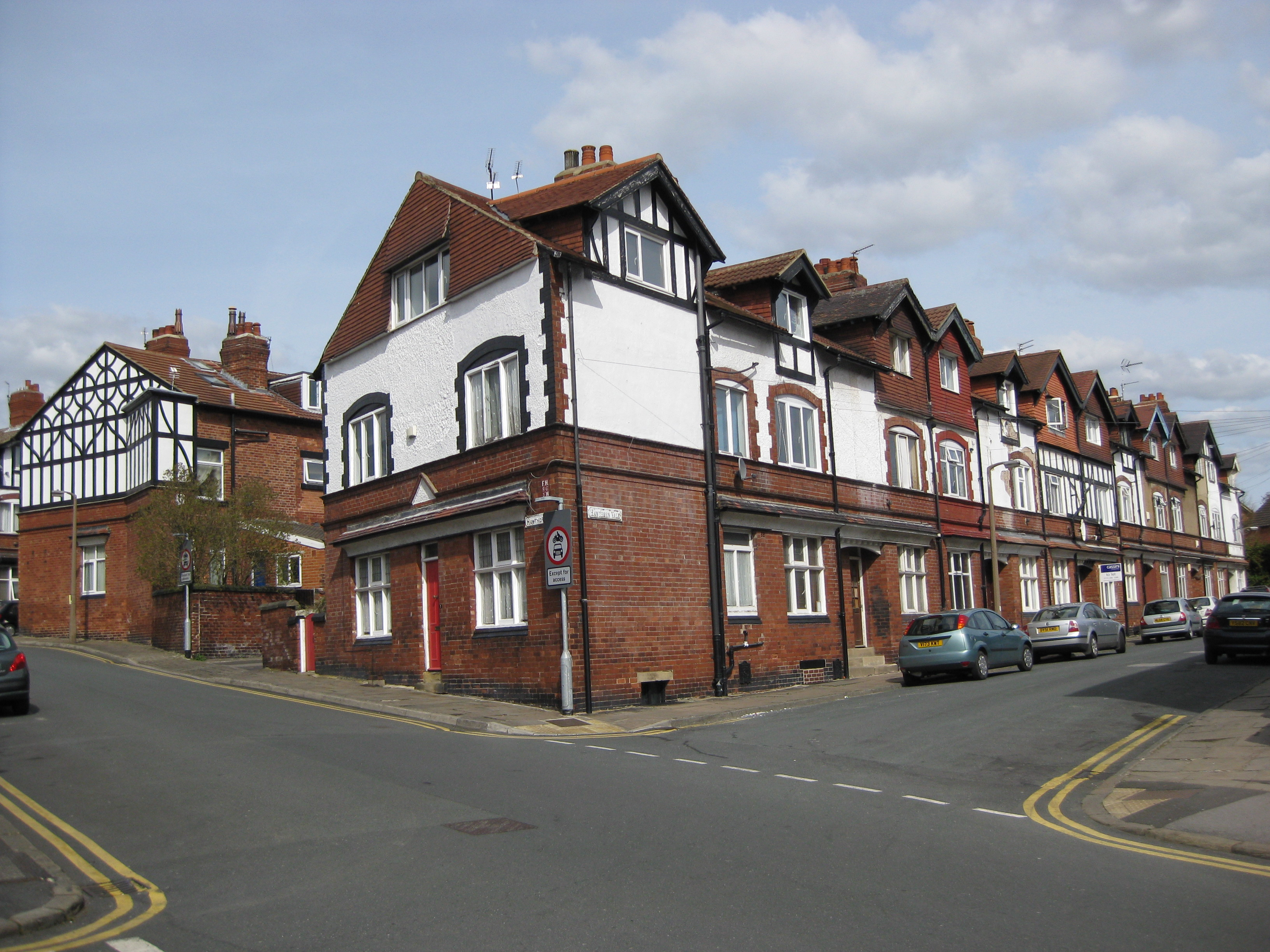
Hawthorn terraces

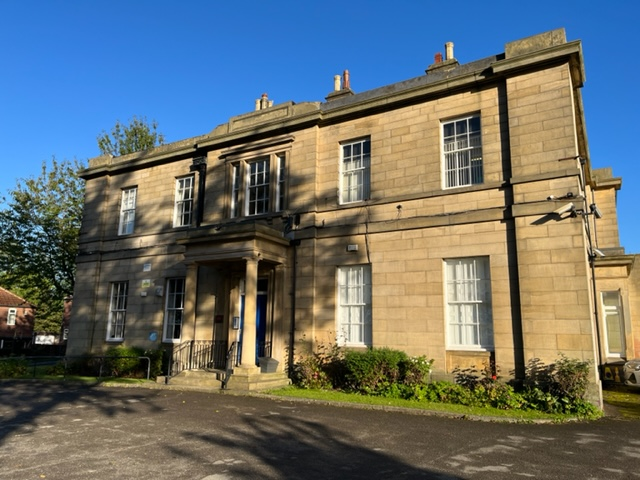
Gledhow Mount Mansion, Roxholme Grove

=== Public buildings ===
On Stainbeck Corner are a pair of linked buildings, originally constructed as a police station, a fire station and public library, opened in 1904. The public library is the only element to remain in operation. The police station became a restaurant and other parts of the complex were turned into flats. It is a grade II listed building. The style is dressed sandstone with ashlar details. The main corner doorway is flanked by Tuscan columns supporting a segmental pedimented hood containing a cartouche, and above this is a moulded and painted coat of arms of Leeds. The Harrogate Road doorways are Tudor-arched with rectangular fanlights. There is a bell turret and a clock. In 1904 the fire station was converted to a public library, with some amendments to the frontage style. The interior features tiled walls with 'LPL' on them, a mosaic floor in the entrance hall, stained glass in doors and ionic columns. Further down Harrogate Road in the direction of Leeds is a brick and sandstone building bearing the sign "Leeds Board School 1878". This is still a school, Chapel Allerton Primary School. It is on the site of the Chapeltown Moor gallows.

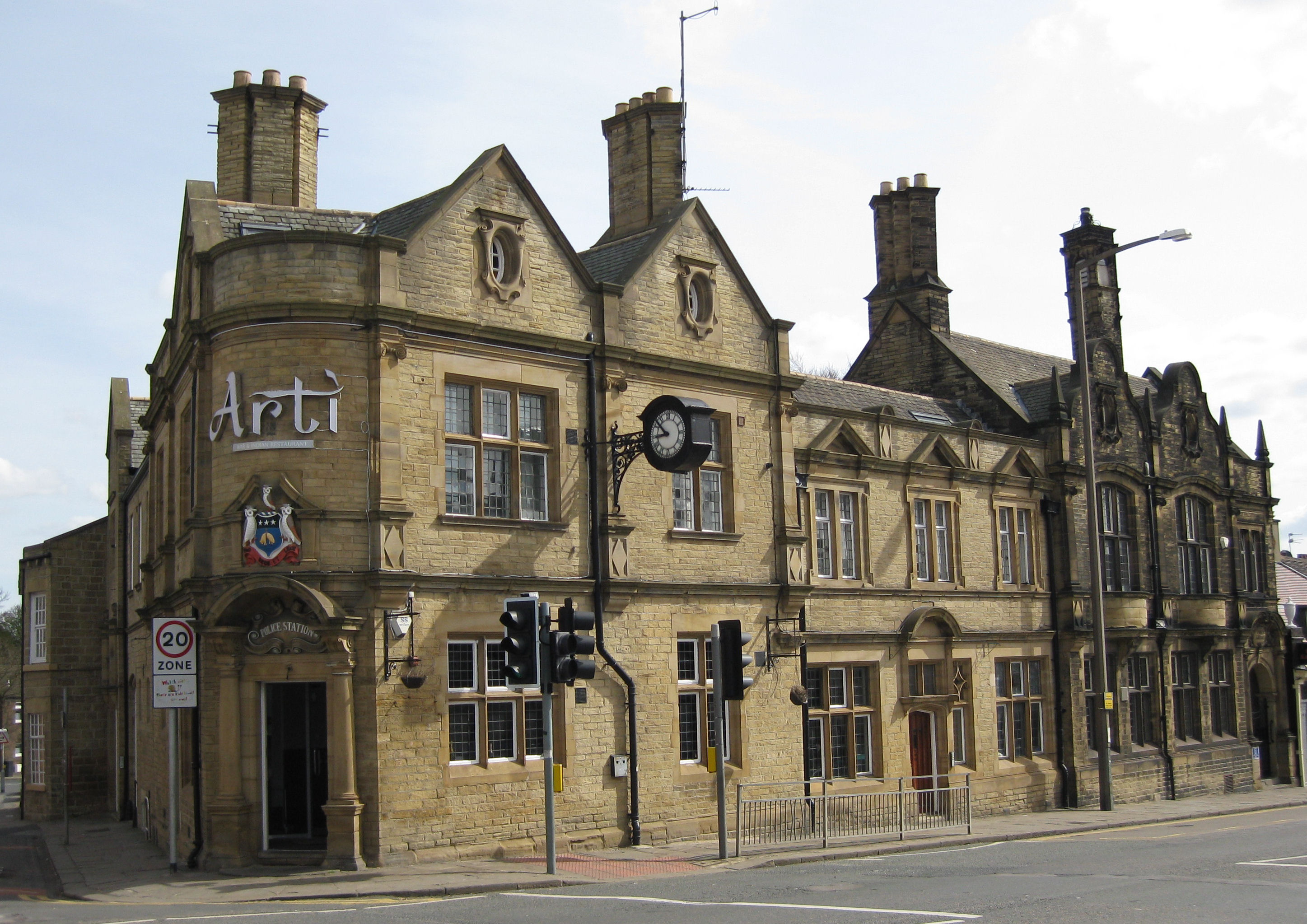
Former police station (left) and library (right)

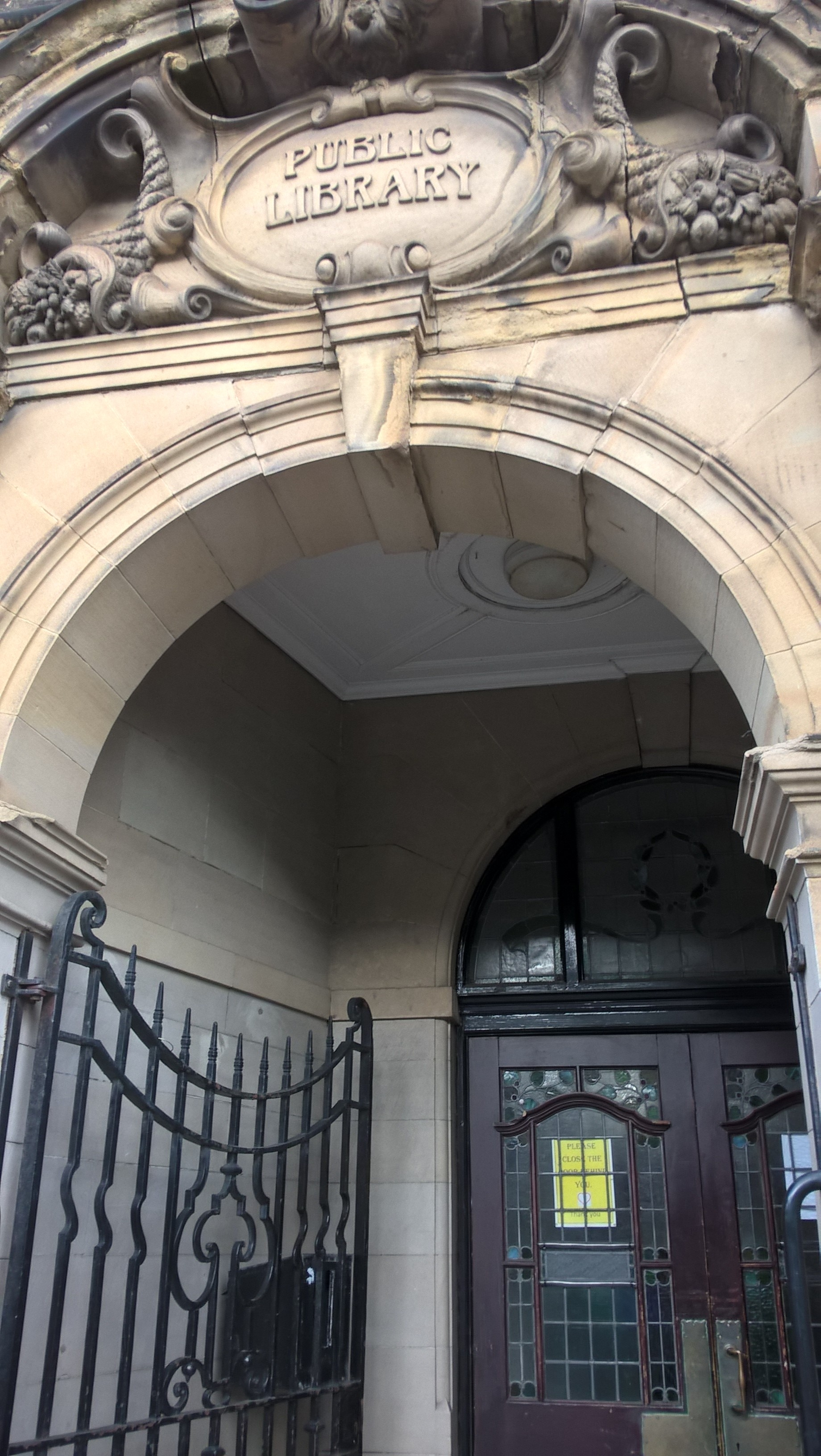
Library entrance

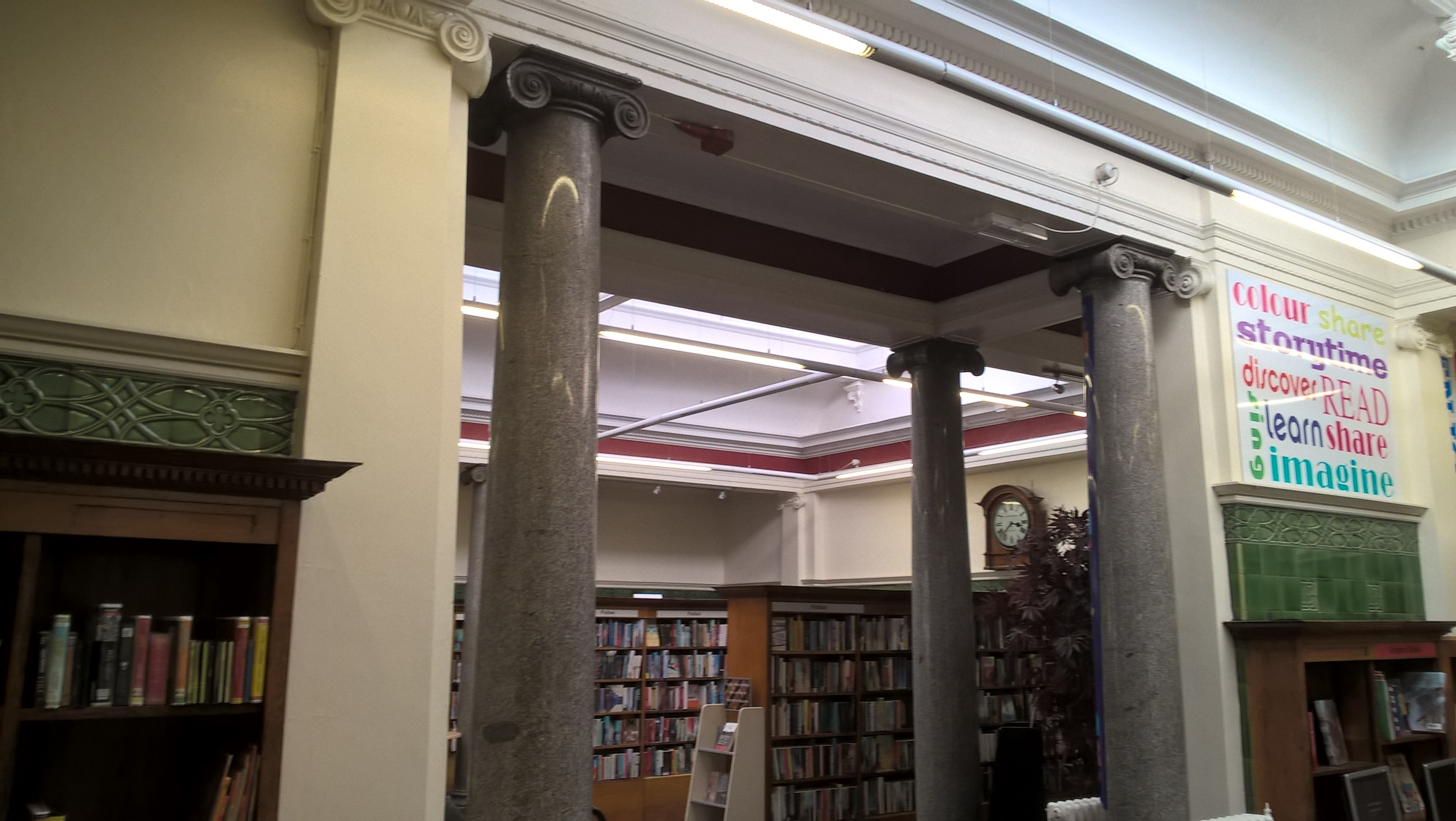
Library interior with Potts of Leeds clock

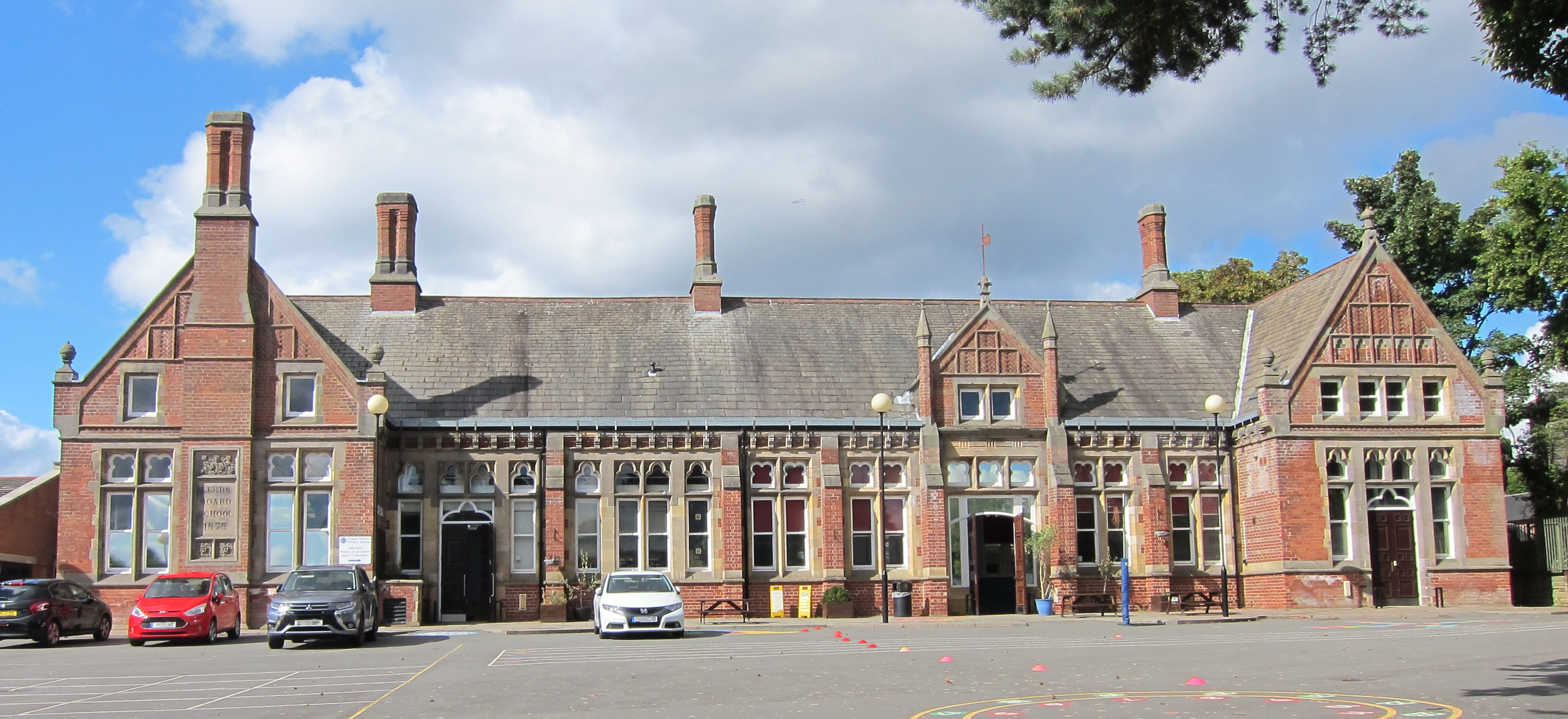
Leeds Board School

=== Inns ===
The public house the Nag's Head opened in 1772 as the Bay Horse Inn, a coaching inn, and according to local legend the original innkeepers were in league with 18th century highwaymen. The Nag's Head has been closed since July 2023. The Regent was completed in the first half of the 19th century, and its exterior is little changed from that time. What is now called the Three Hulats was previously the Mexborough Arms. (The hulats are owls, of which there are three on the arms of the Earl of Mexborough) The present building dates from 1911, replacing a 19th-century Mexborough Arms, a terminus for the horse tram service from Leeds, itself replacing the 17th century Bowling Green Tavern. The Mustard Pot was converted from a house built in 1653 into a pub in 1979 (see 'Houses' section above).

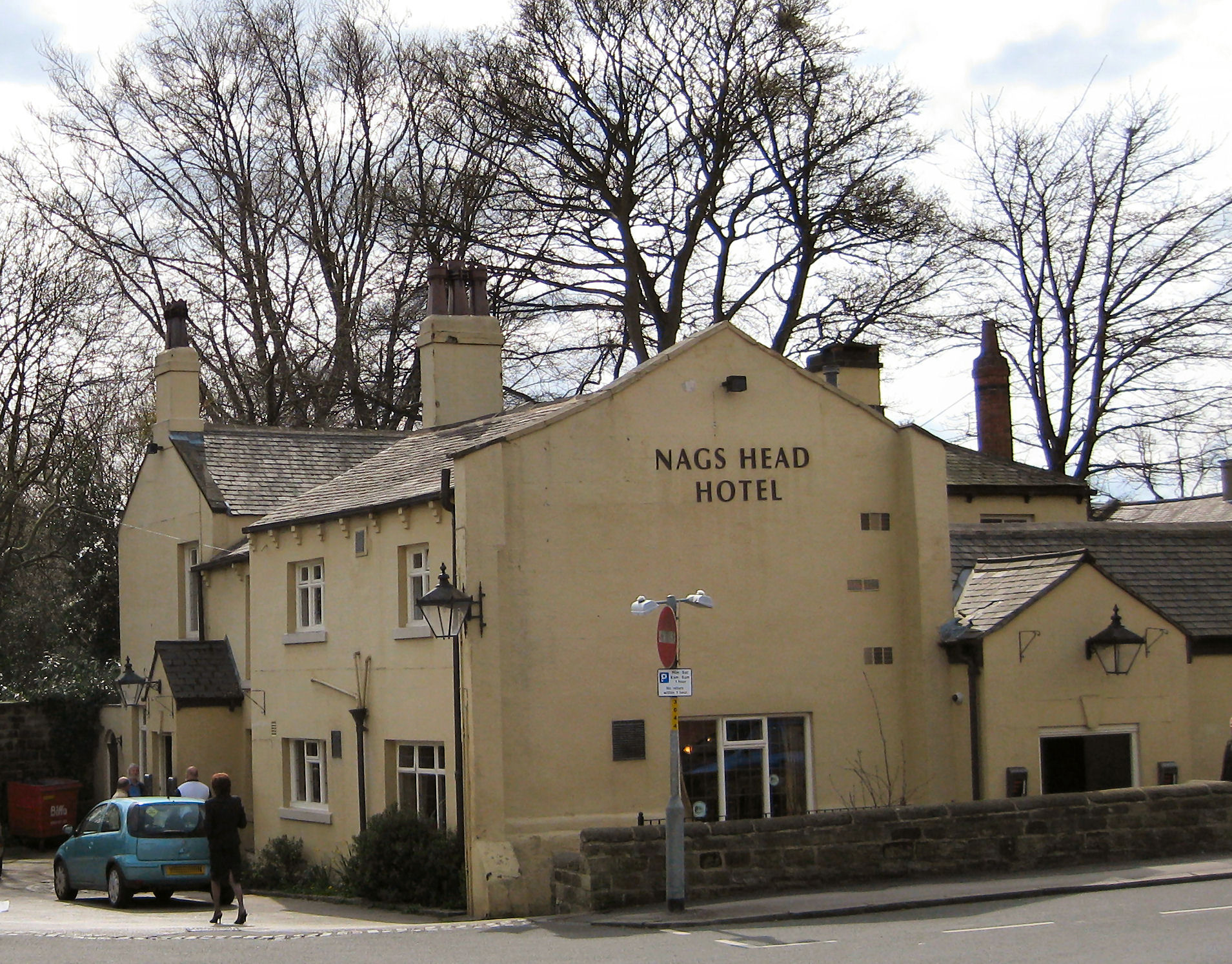
Nag's Head

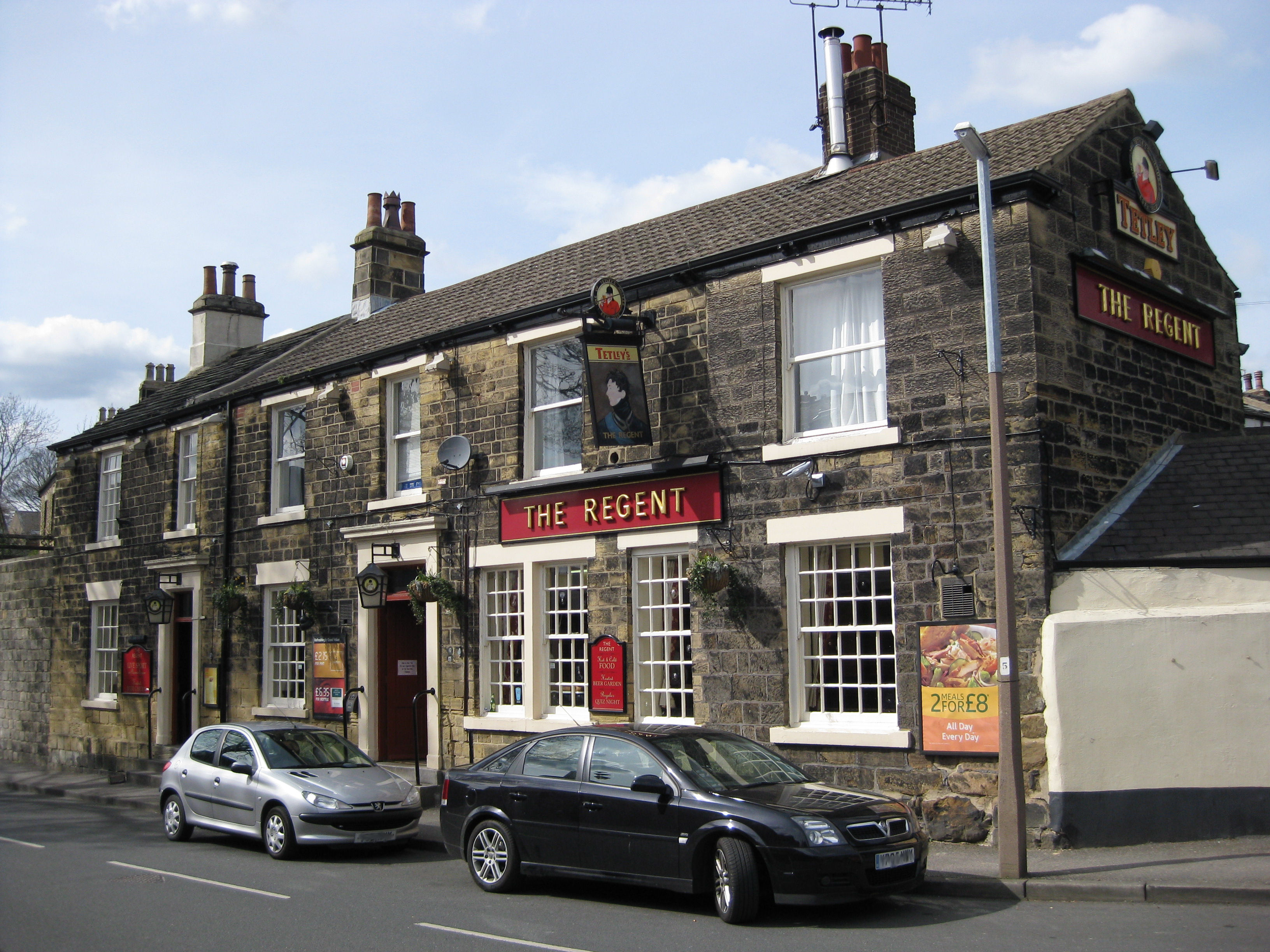
The Regent

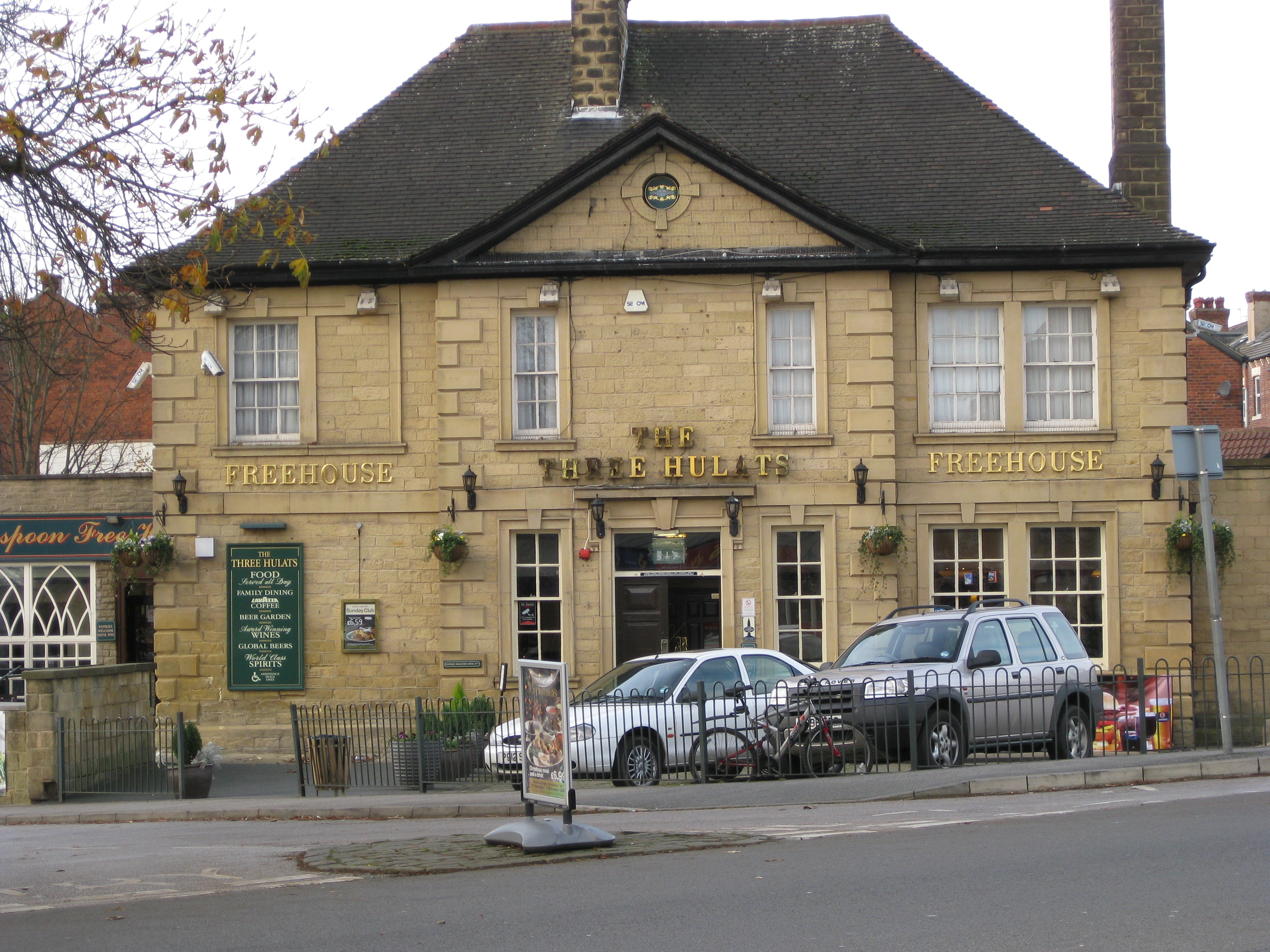
Former Mexborough Arms

=== Churches ===
The area is home to a gothic stone church, St Matthew's Church, built in 1900, the architect being George Frederick Bodley. It replaced the old church set in the churchyard on Harrogate Road. By 1935 the old church had become so unsafe it was demolished. Russian Orthodox church services also take place there.

A Methodist church built in local sandstone opened in 1836 on Town Street. It was replaced in the 1870s by a gothic church on Harrogate Road and the stone chapel became a Sunday School, with a date stone 1878 - often mistaken as the date of the building itself. This later became a community centre. The gothic church was demolished in the 1970s and in 1983 a new, smaller Methodist church opened. Its entrance faces the late Georgian building. In January 2005, Chapel Allerton Methodist Church signed a local ecumenical covenant with St. Matthew's Church. Grace Gospel Church also uses the Methodist Church for weekly services.

Originally a congregation planted from Moortown Baptist Church, Chapel Allerton Baptist Church became an independent church in 2002. The church currently meets in the Methodist Centre, having previously met on Sundays at Potternewton Centre, off Scott Hall Road, and in Chapel Allerton Primary School.

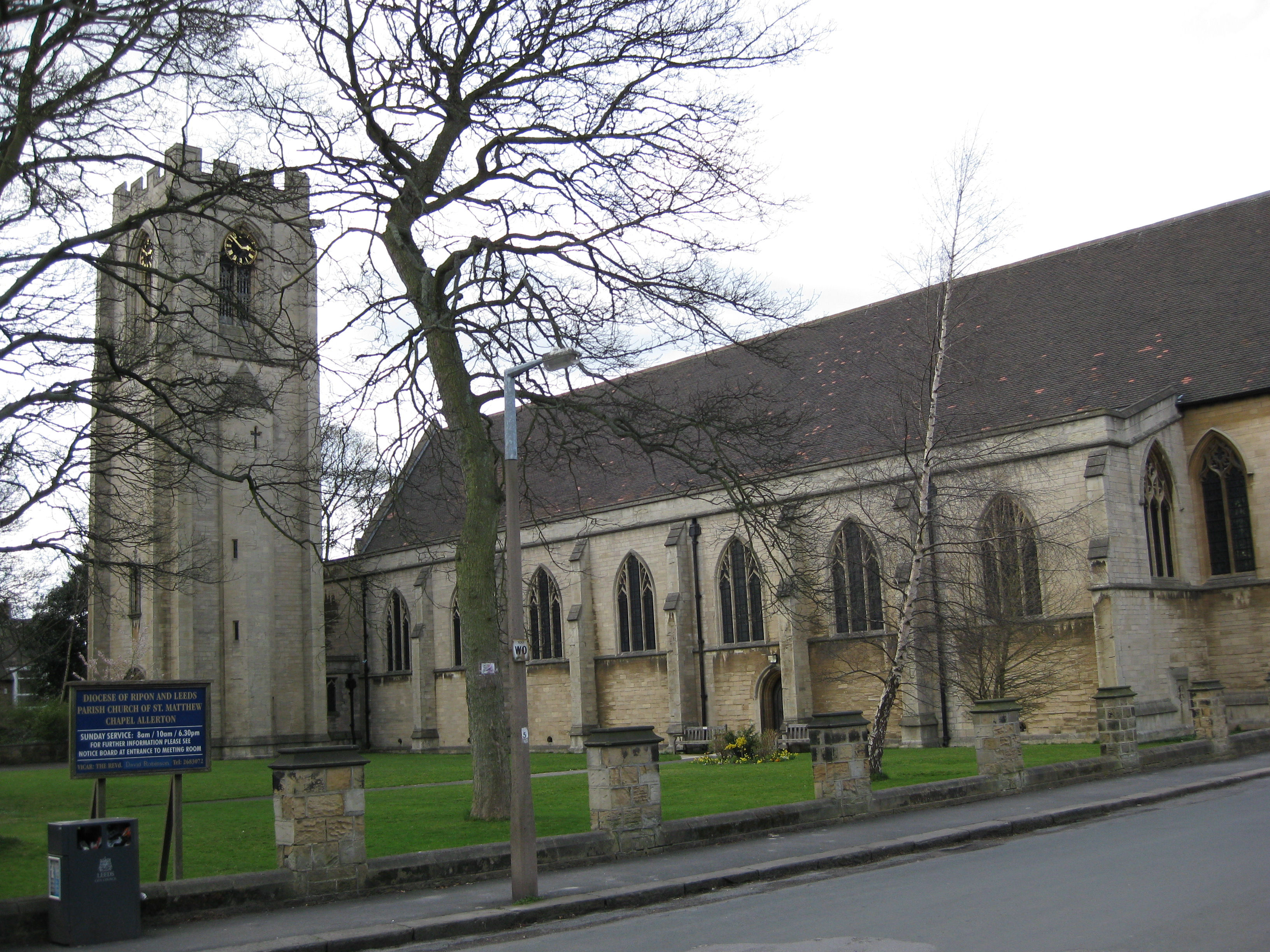
St Matthew's Church

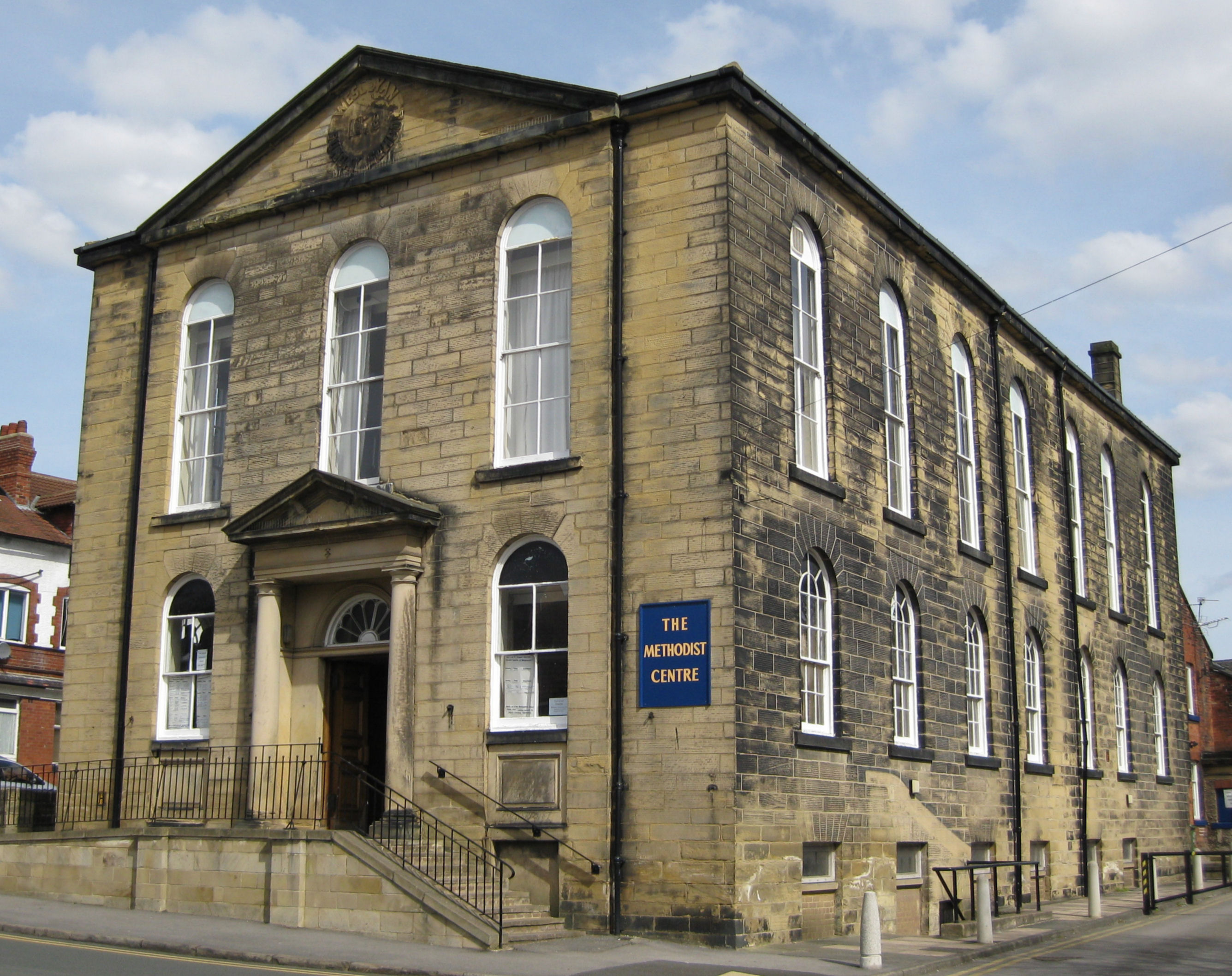
Methodist Sunday School (now a community centre)

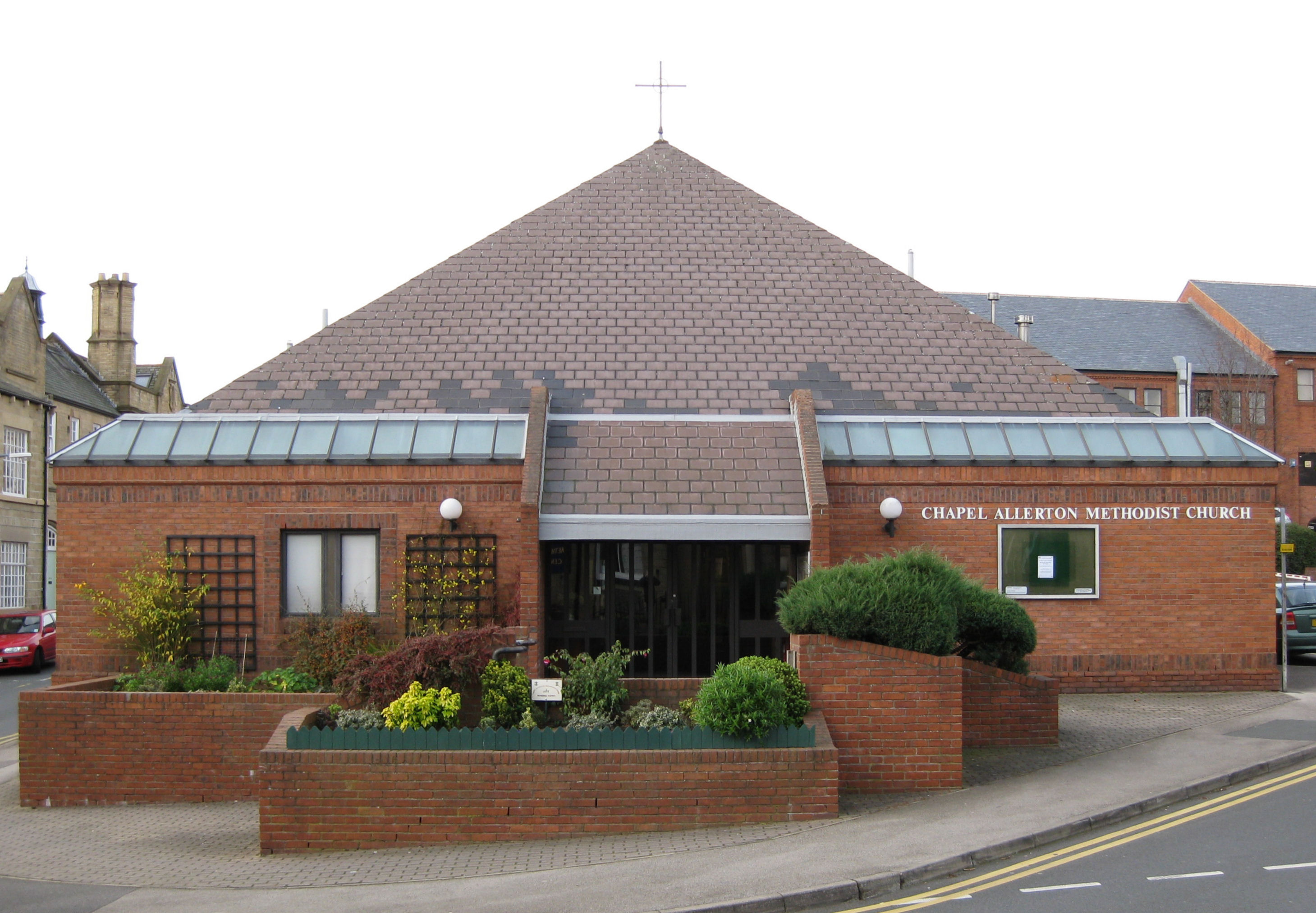
Current Methodist Church

== Amenities ==
The area has an established local centre, which is situated around the junction of Stainbeck Lane and Harrogate Road. This consists of a Co-op supermarket, several restaurants as well as many pubs and bars.

Many cafés, bars and restaurants utilise pavement space creating a pavement café culture in the area. As of late 2021, this is being significantly improved by closing the Northern half of the Stainbeck Lane and Harrogate Road junction to create a public plaza. Some of the shops are chains. There are however a significant number of thriving independent businesses.

Chapel Allerton has an arts centre, Seven Arts on Harrogate Road. It provides concerts and community events and performances.

Dyneley House, one of several care homes in Chapel Allerton, was originally established to care for members of the Christian Science denomination in need of residential support.

The Chapel Allerton Arts Festival is held the week following August Bank Holiday each year, with performances on a stage in Regent Street. It attracts hundreds of people, assisted by volunteers from the local community.

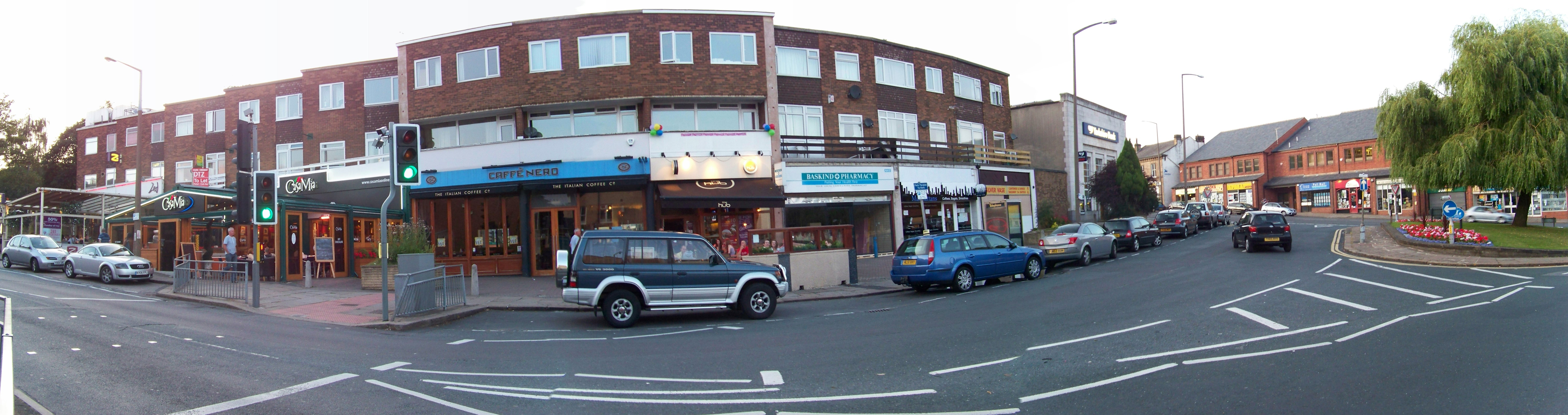
Bars and restaurants on Stainbeck Lane

== Sport ==
Chapel Allerton Lawn Tennis and Squash Club is at the back of the square, behind the Mustard Pot pub, and there are public tennis courts in Chapel Allerton Park. The park also offers table tennis facilities and there is a crown green bowling club adjacent to the park.

Chapel Allerton Running Club has been established since 1992. Members compete in a range of individual and team road, cross-country and fell races. There is also an annual club championship.

== Transport ==
The Leeds Tramway once ran through Chapel Allerton, but was dismantled in 1959. Chapel Allerton was also once on the main road to Harrogate but the building of the A61 Scott Hall Road effectively bypassed Chapel Allerton, along with Chapeltown and Moortown. First Leeds provide the main bus service in Chapel Allerton, with the numbers 2, 3 and 3A running a service to and from the Leeds city centre every 10 minutes or better, and also providing links with: Roundhay, Gledhow, Moortown, Chapeltown, Hunslet, Beeston, Middleton and the White Rose Centre. Other routes in the area include the 91 to Harehills and Halton Moor in one direction, and Headingley, Kirkstall, Bramley and Pudsey in the other. Harrogate Bus Company also run route 36 route through Chapel Allerton, linking it with Leeds city centre (central bus station), Moortown, Alwoodley, Harewood, Pannal, Harrogate, Killinghall, Ripley and Ripon. The nearest railway station to Chapel Allerton is Headingley, from where services run to Leeds, Burley, Horsforth, Starbeck, Knaresborough, and York.

== Hospital ==
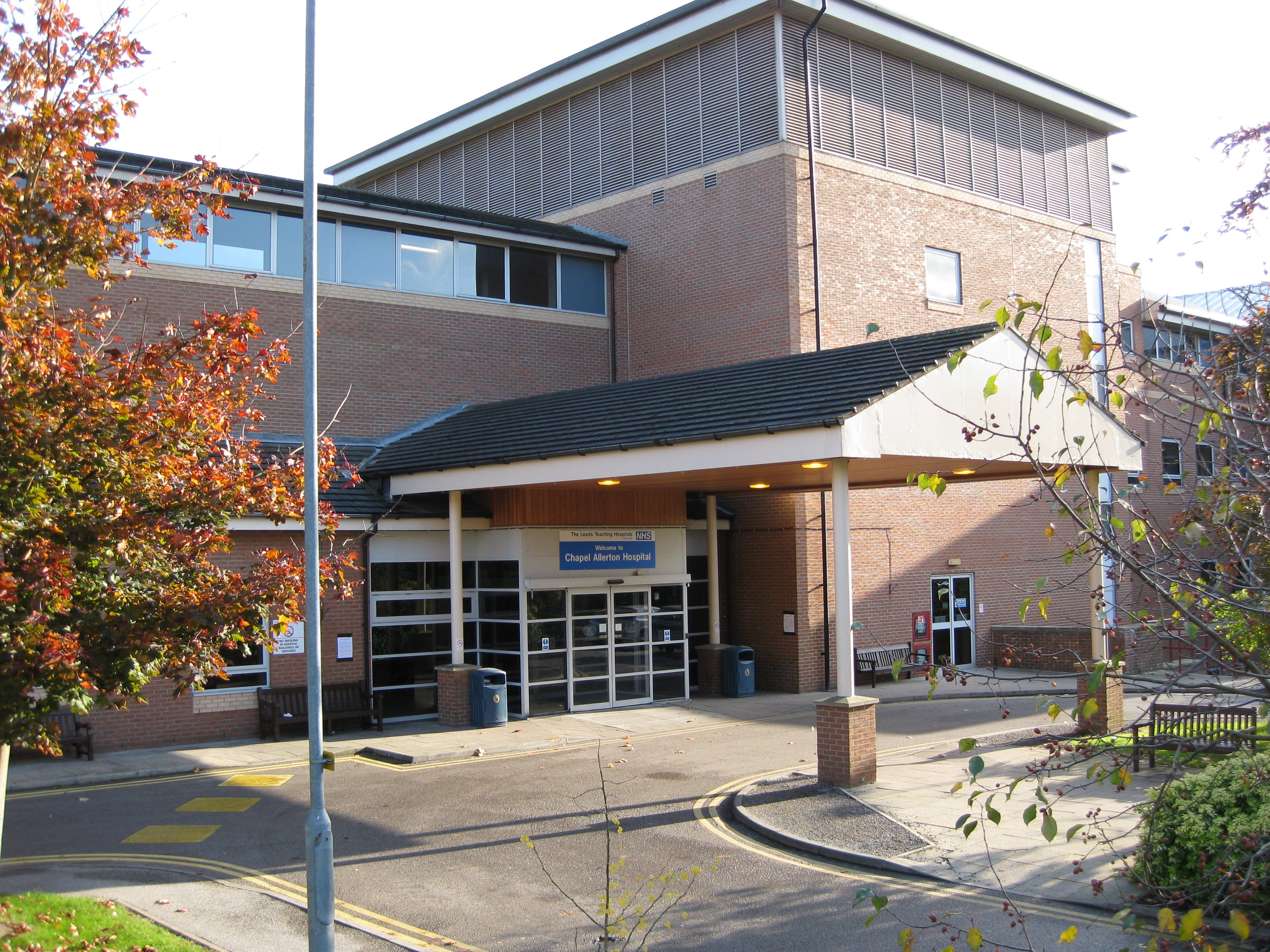
Chapel Allerton Hospital

Chapel Allerton Hospital is an NHS hospital which includes the Chapel Allerton Orthopaedic Centre. It was established in 1926 in the building and grounds of Gledhow Grove mansion, a Grade II listed building which has now been converted to housing. The hospital now occupies buildings which were opened in 1994, across Harehills Lane from its original site.

== Notable people ==
- Margaret Scriven (1912–2001) Tennis player, born in Chapel Allerton, who won four Grand Slam titles, including back-to-back victories in the singles at the French Championships in 1933 and 1934.
- Thelma Ruby (b.1925) West End theatre actress known for Fiddler on the Roof, born in Chapel Allerton. Performed for ENSA 1944 and 80 years later appeared in Back to Black (Amy Winehouse biopic).

== Notable references in popular culture ==
- Hill View Avenue and Norfolk Green were used as the main setting in 1980s Yorkshire Television dramas The Beiderbecke Tapes and The Beiderbecke Connection. There were also several other scenes shot in the Chapel Allerton area.
- The Yorkshire Television series Fat Friends was in part filmed around Chapel Allerton, as well as in other nearby suburbs such as Kirkstall, Headingley and Moor Grange.
- The Channel 4 series Sirens was in part filmed on Victoria Street.
- The first Café Scientifique was organised by local resident Duncan Dallas in 1998 and held in In Vino Veritas in Regent Street (now Sukho Thai restaurant).
- The House of Koko was used in filming a scene in Emmerdale.
- 2013 BBC mini series The Great Train Robbery was partially filmed on Victoria Street

== See also ==
- Listed buildings in Leeds (Chapel Allerton Ward)
