= St Matthew's Church, Chapel Allerton =

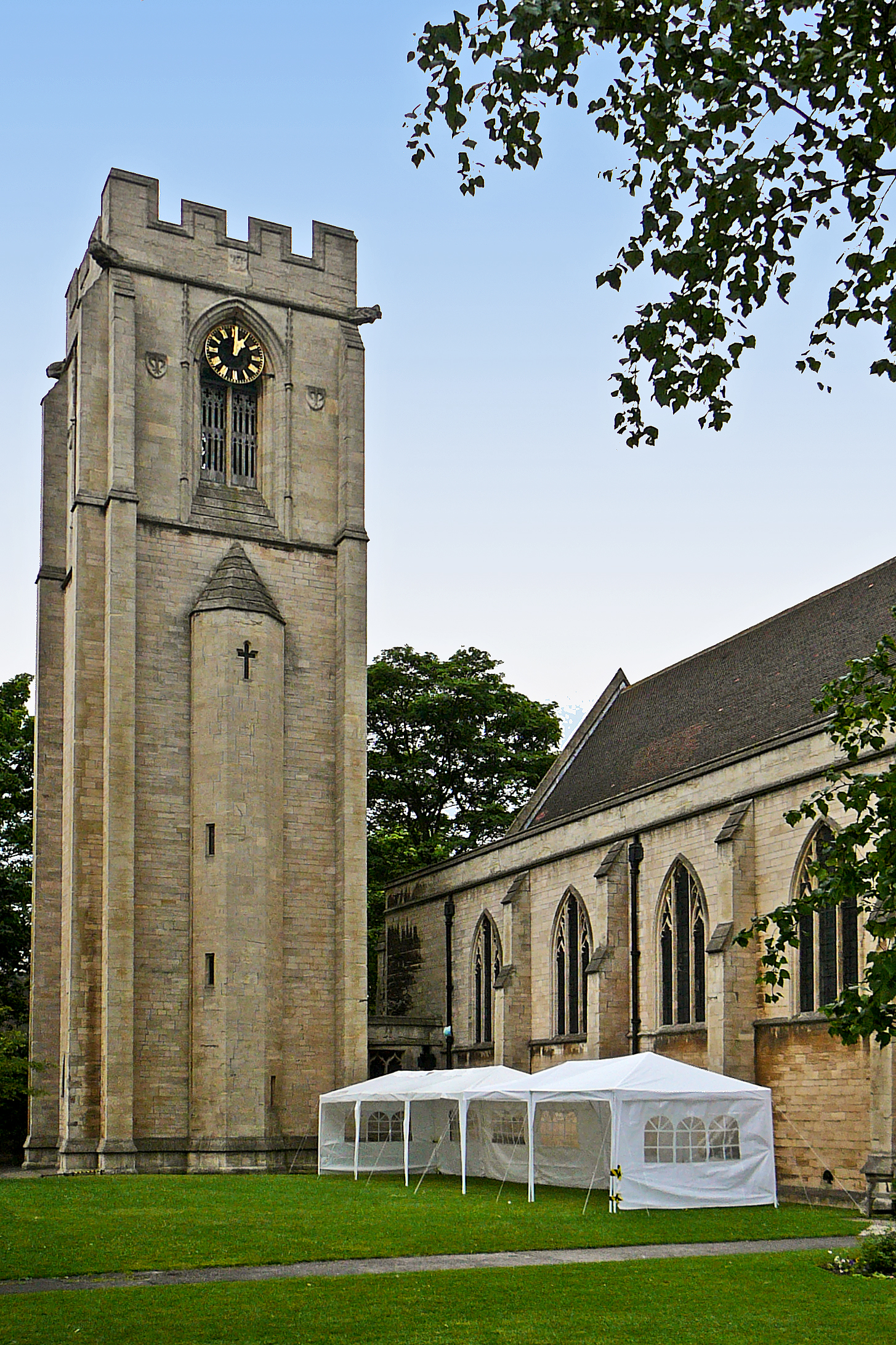
- St Matthew's Church
- St Matthew's Church, Chapel Allerton
- 53.831764°N 1.541022°W
- Denomination: Church of England
- Churchmanship: Broad Church

History
- Dedication: St Matthew

Administration
- Province: York
- Diocese: Leeds
- Parish: Chapel Allerton, Leeds

St Matthew's Church is a Church of England church in Chapel Allerton, Leeds, England, described by Nikolaus Pevsner as a "noble and spacious building" with a "bold, sturdy tower". The church has been Grade II* listed since 1963.

== Location ==
The church is on Wood Lane in Chapel Allerton.

== History ==
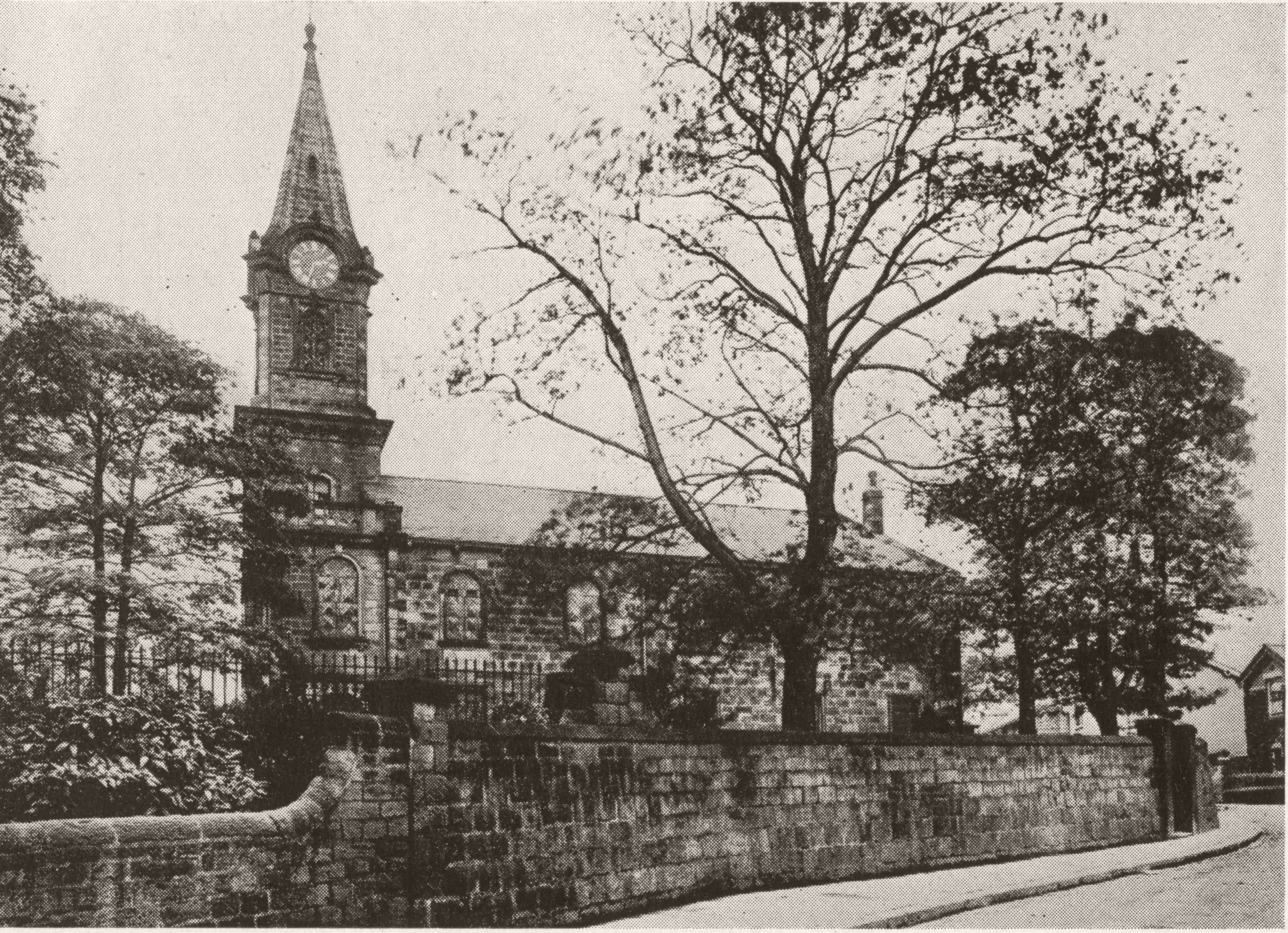
The former St. Matthew's Church in 1911 seen after its replacement. During this period it was used for meetings. It was demolished in 1935.

The church was built between 1897 and 1898 to a design by George Frederick Bodley, replacing an earlier smaller church. It was built by Stephens and Baslow of Bristol, with glass by Burlison and Grylls. By 1935 the former church had fallen into a state of disrepair and was demolished.

== Architectural style ==
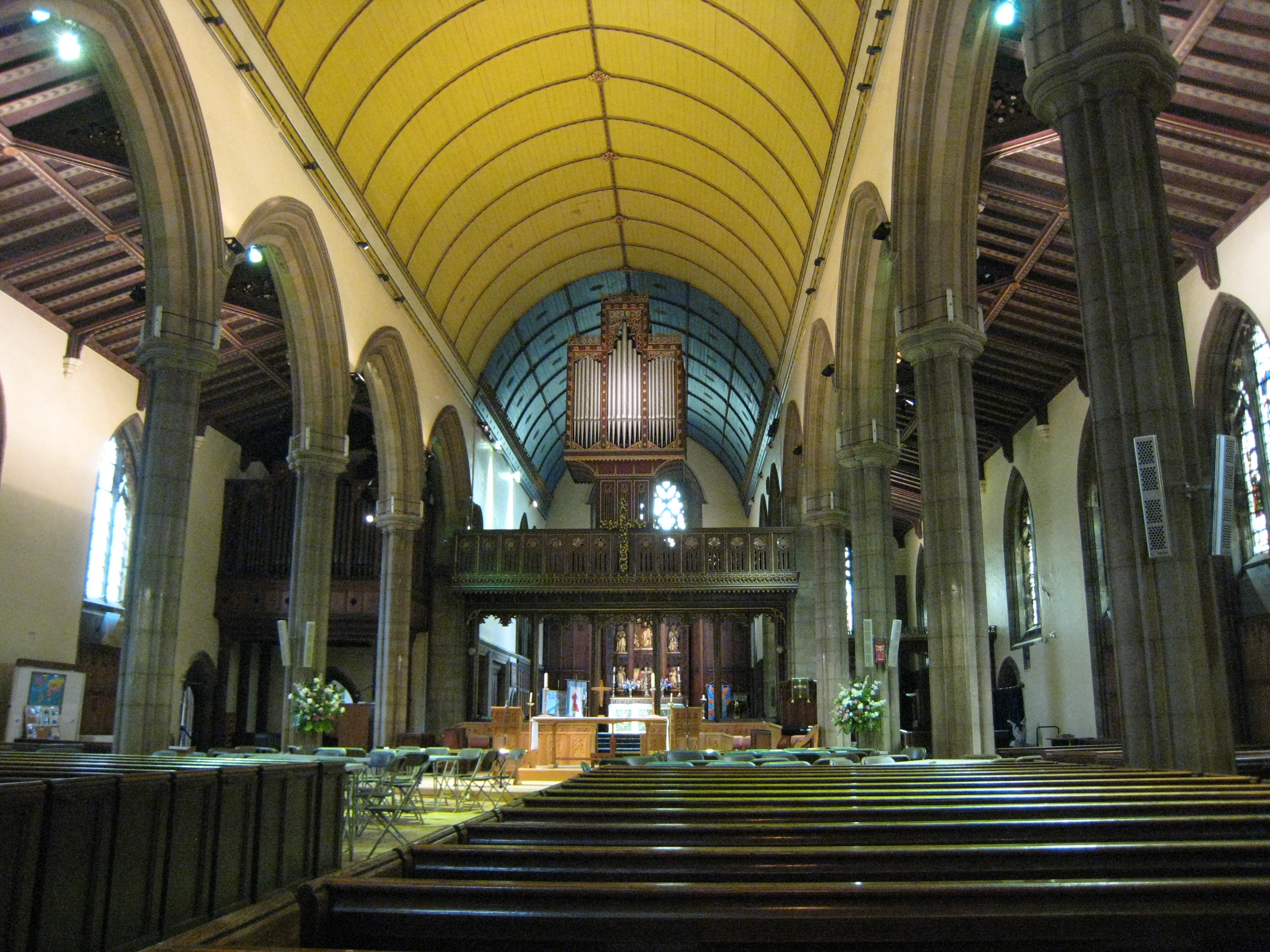
Interior, 2017

=== Exterior ===
The church is of Bath stone and Ancaster stone ashlar. The church has narrow buttresses and a crenellated tower with a clock.

=== Interior ===
The church has three light windows set in recesses with quatrefoils. The floor is stone flagged and the nave ceiling wooden tunnel-vaulted. There is an organ on a mezzanine level at the east end of the north aisle. The reredos is carved and gilded wood.

== See also ==
- List of places of worship in the City of Leeds
