= Leylands, Leeds =

Former area of Leeds, UK

Coordinates: 53°48′05.6″N 1°32′08.2″W

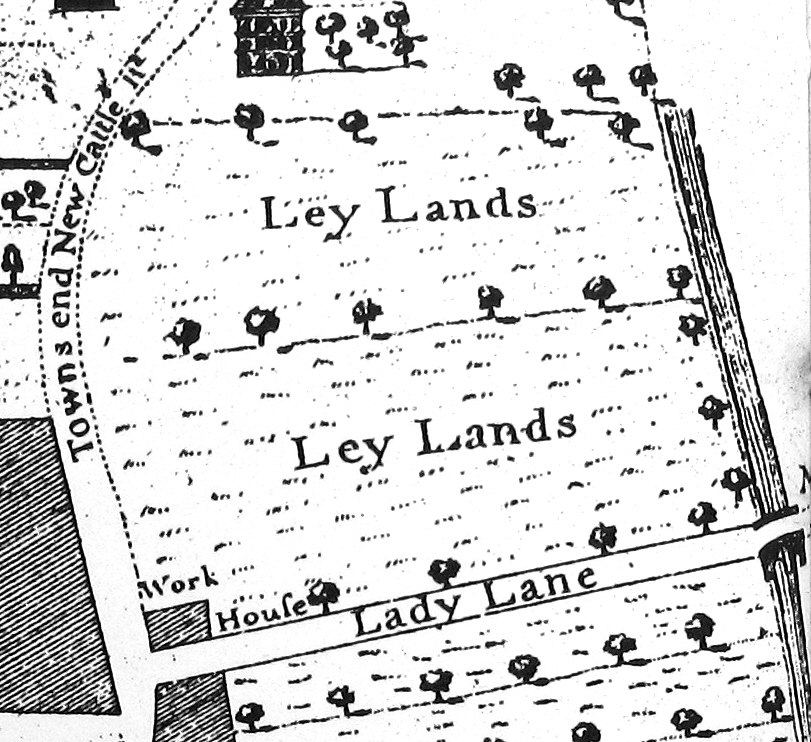
Ley Lands 1726

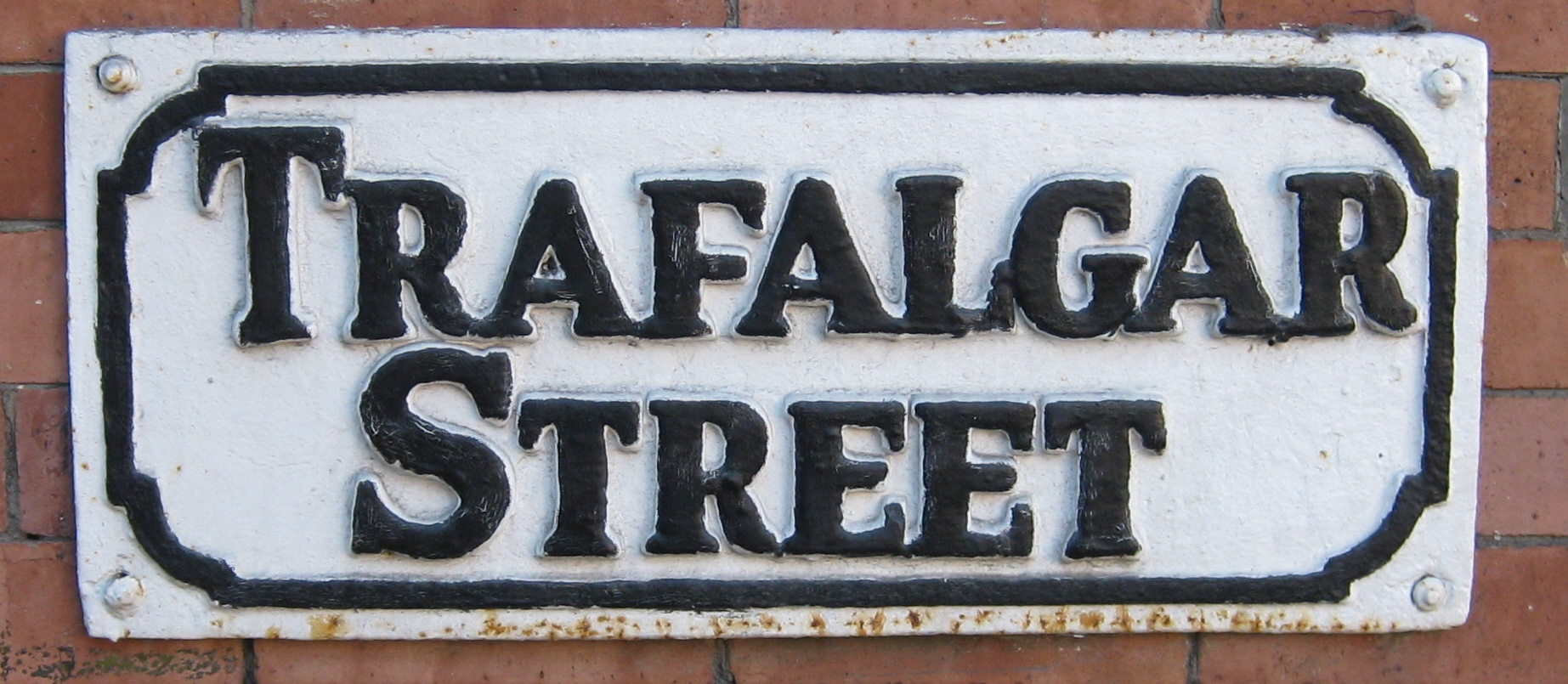
Street Sign

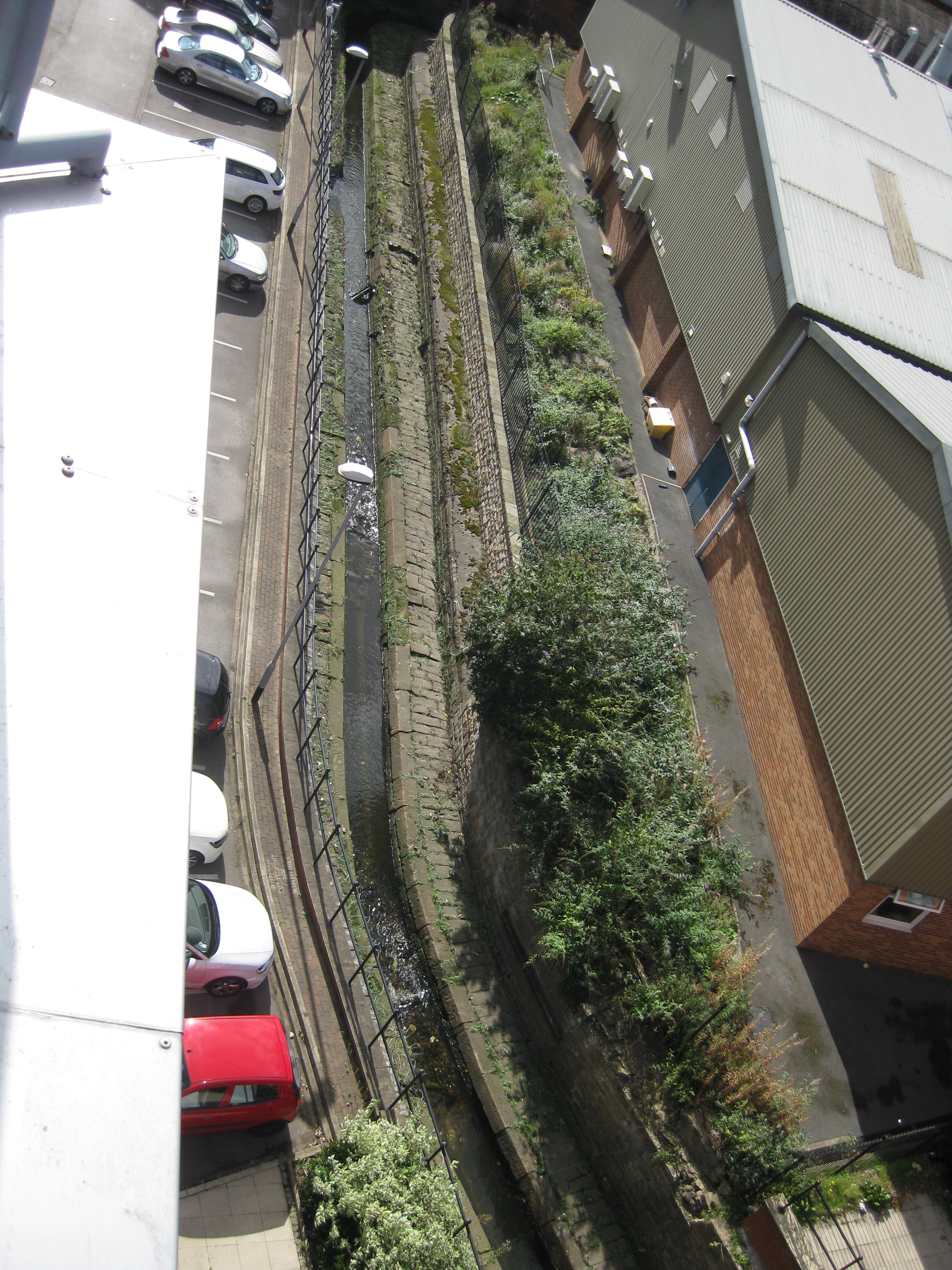
Lady Beck going south from Skinner Lane, with the former Leylands on the right

The Leylands was an area of Leeds, north of the city centre and west of Mabgate. John Cossins' 1726 Plan of Leedes shows two fields marked Ley Lands north of Lady Lane and west of the Sheepscar Beck (also later known as Lady Beck) which correspond to the area.

== Development ==
An 1881 street map shows the area built up and called The Leylands, and in 1887 the area had a population of 6209. A plan of 1815 shows construction in progress with street names commemorating the victories of Nelson, namely Trafalgar Street and Nile Street.

The Leylands occupied an area between Vicar Lane and North Street (to the west) and Eastgate and Regent Street (to the east) with Lady Lane and Skinner Lane being the south and north boundaries. The main thoroughfare was Bridge Street, named from the Lady Bridge which crossed the Lady Beck. The beck was the eastern boundary. The Leylands was an area of densely packed poor quality housing for workers most built before 1847. They worked in the nearby foundries and mills which sprang up in the 19th century. The area described in 1889 as "a dank district in that uninviting city". There were some attempts at improvement at this time with the construction of a Leeds Board school in 1875.

St Luke's Church (now demolished) was built in 1841 on the corner of Skinner Lane and North Street.

== Jewish community ==
Low rents attracted immigrants, notably Irish, but by the mid-1890s the area was predominantly Jewish: in 1892 of the 1300 houses in the area, 900 were occupied by Jews. A synagogue was built, and the school became entirely Jewish, with three other Jewish schools within the Leylands. In 1901 this area of less than 50 acres (20 hectares) had a population of more than 6000 Jews.

The predominant trade for the Jewish population was tailoring and the sweatshops of the Leylands became notorious. (The 1901 Census identifies 'Tailoring' as the occupation of 2293 Jews, with 'Tailoress' for 851, many times the next largest 430 for the 'Boot/shoe trade'.) Just north of Skinner Lane there still is the "Tailors' Machinists & Pressers' Trade Union" building which was a Jewish Trade union, the building was also used for Jewish social events. It was to this area and these workers that Montague Burton came to build a clothing factory on Concord Street with decent conditions to establish a business which later resulted in a larger factory in Harehills.

As the Jewish community prospered, they (and their businesses and places of worship) moved north to Chapeltown and the area was largely cleared in the slum removal programme of 1936/7.

== Current status ==
A remaining 19th-century building is the Smithfield Hotel on North Street, built about 1860 to serve the cattle market on the opposite side of the road, it then became the façade of the offices of Thomas Green & Son's ironworks which stretched east behind it, producing items from lawnmowers to steamrollers. The garment industry is represented by the 1914 Lyons Works on Templar Lane, which had one of the earliest production lines: it has recently been used as the background for an artwork for Leeds College of Art (now Leeds Arts University). Templar House at the junction of Lady Lane and Templar Lane, a Grade II listed building, was built in 1840 as a Wesleyan Methodist Association chapel and converted into offices in 1933, latterly used by British Road Services, whose signage is still visible, but the building is now closed and boarded up.

Today, much of the southern portion of the area is used as public car parking for the city centre, but there are some offices, apartments and light industry. The area still contains the Leeds College of Building and Salvation Army worship and community halls.

== Gallery ==
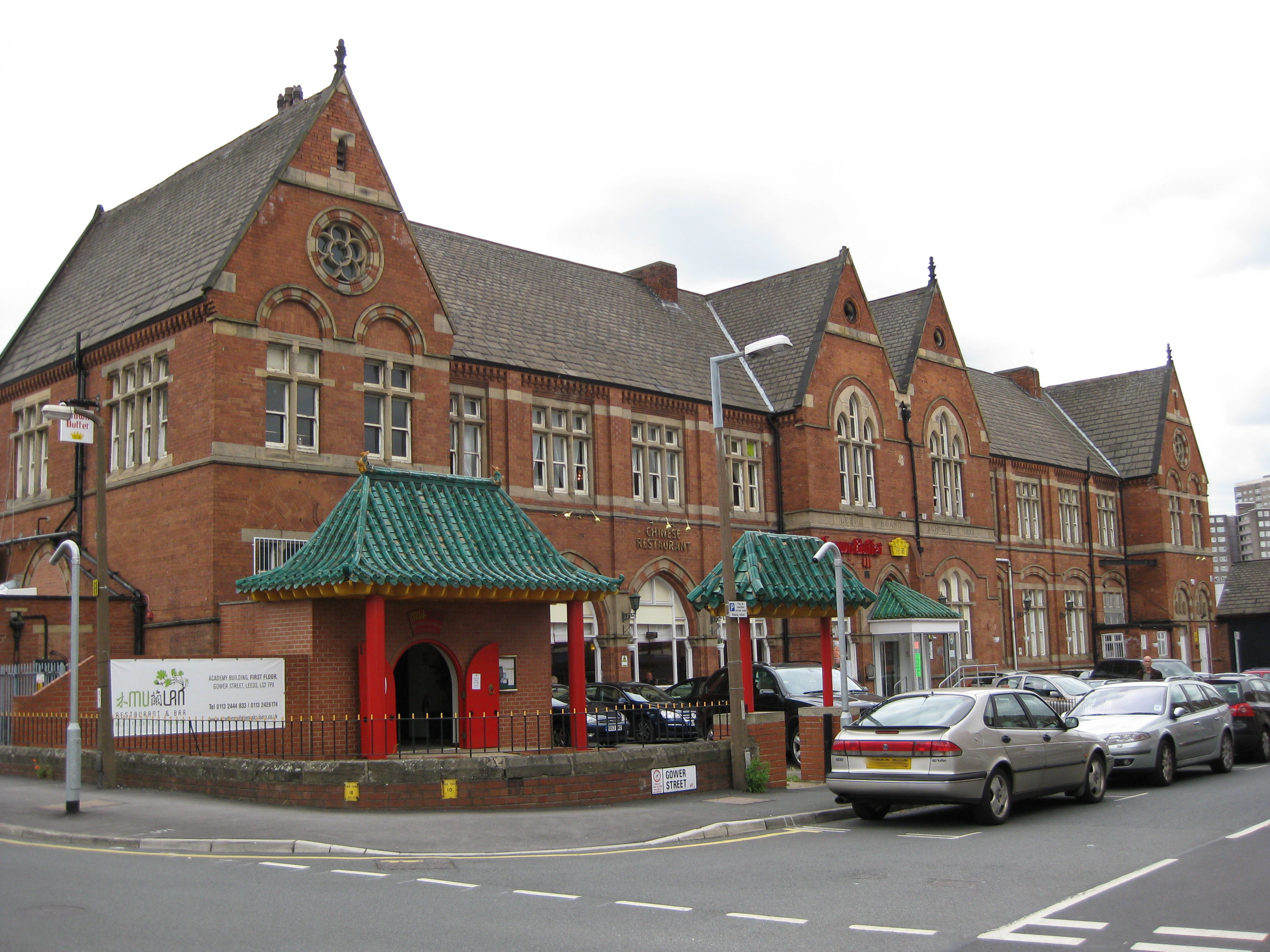
Leylands School Building 1875

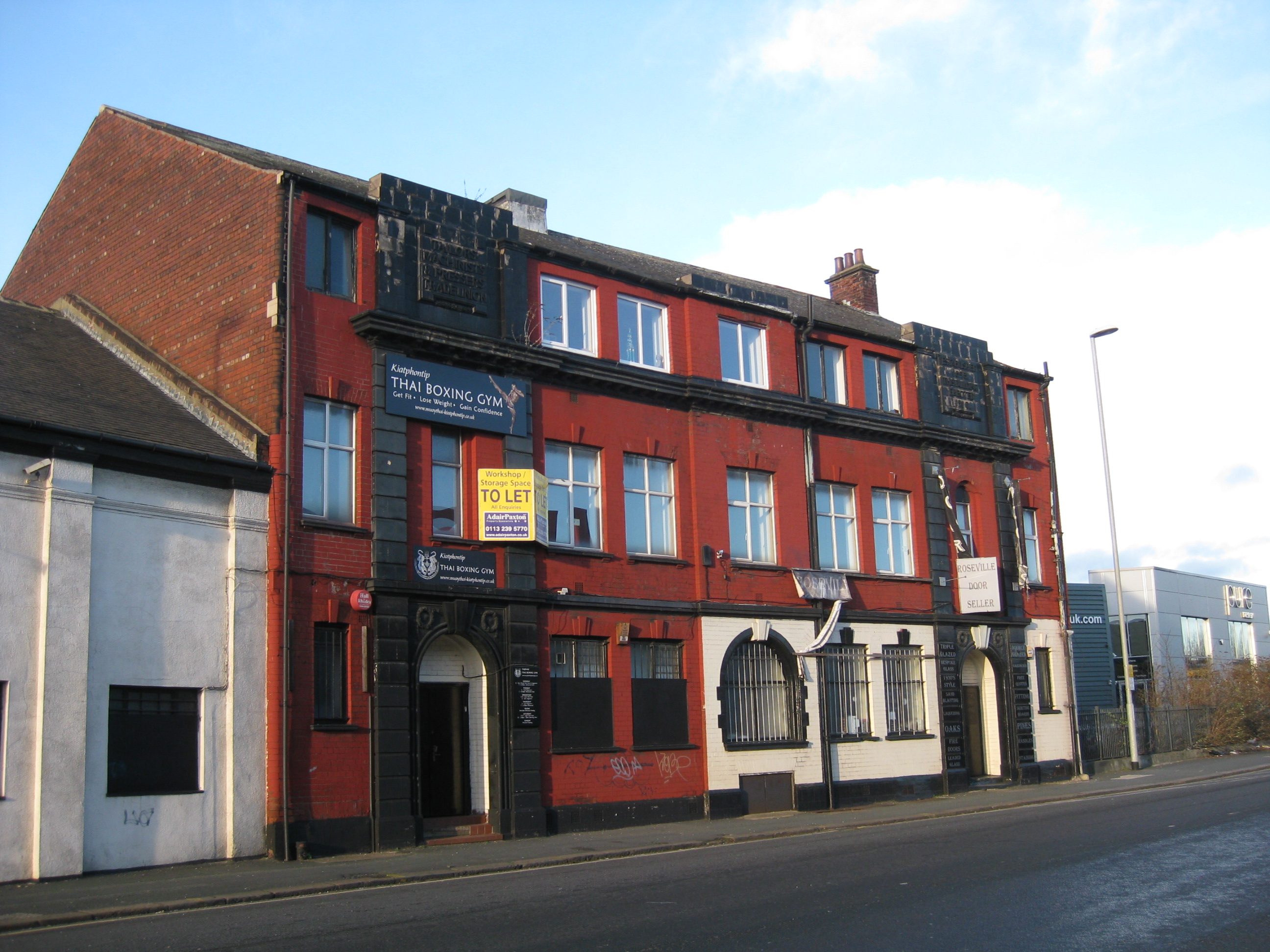
Tailors' Machinists & Pressers' Trade Union building

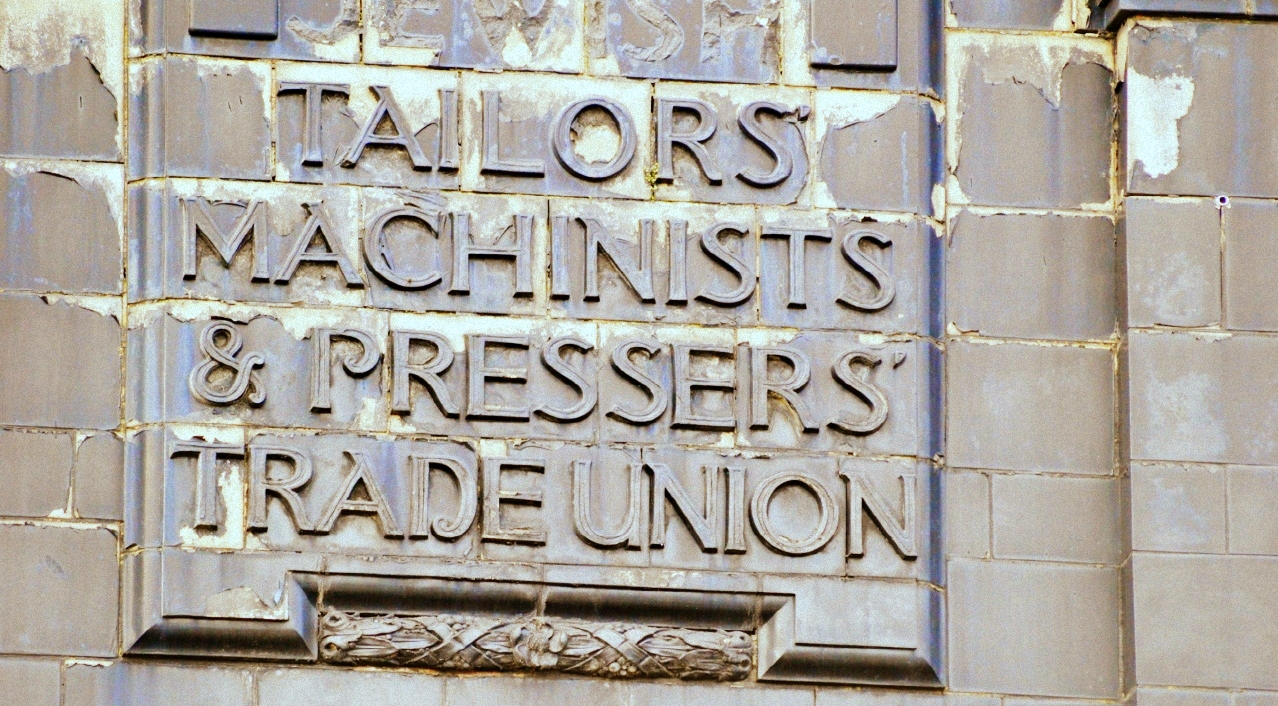
Sign at the Tailors' Machinists & Pressers' Trade Union building

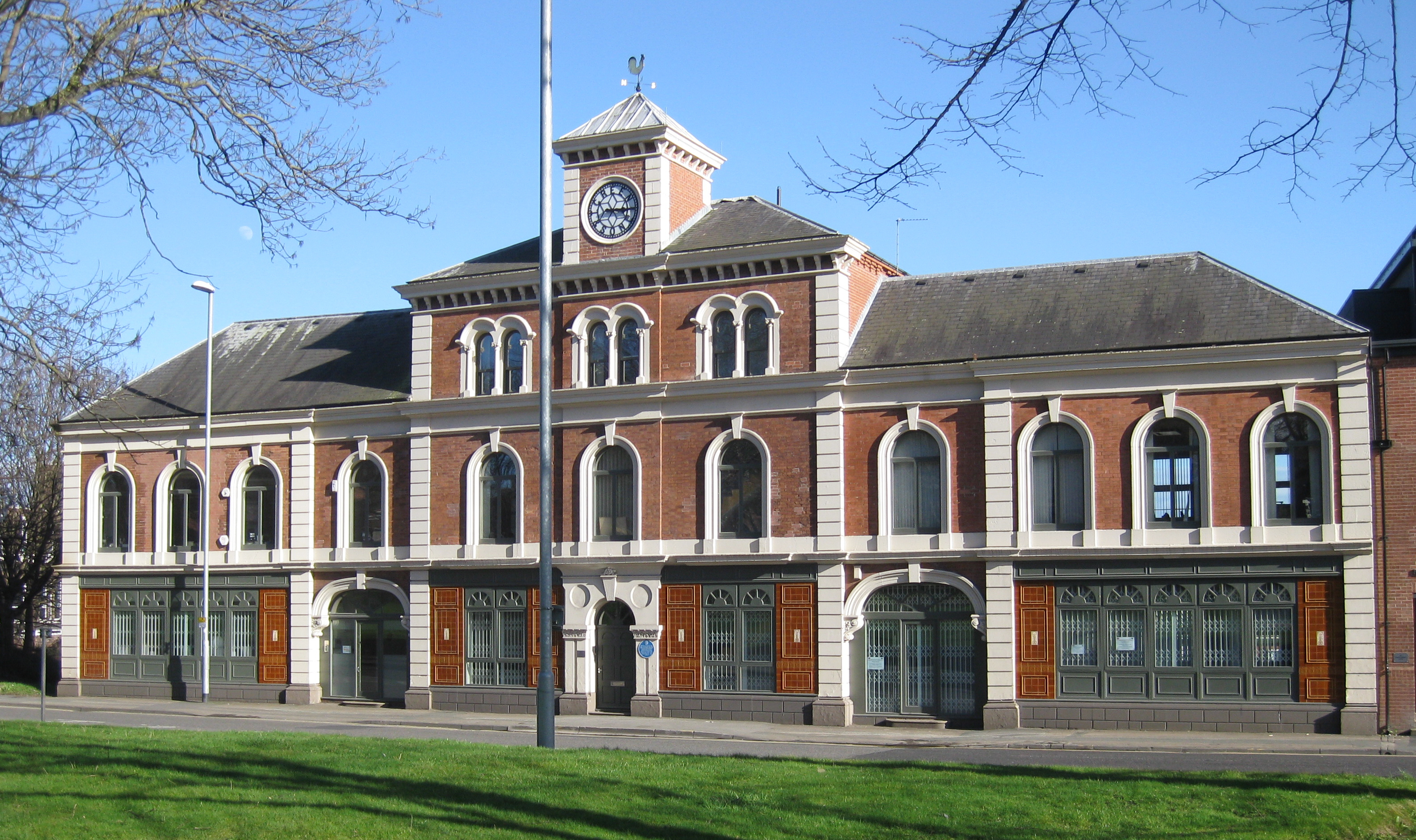
Smithfield Hotel/Ironworks

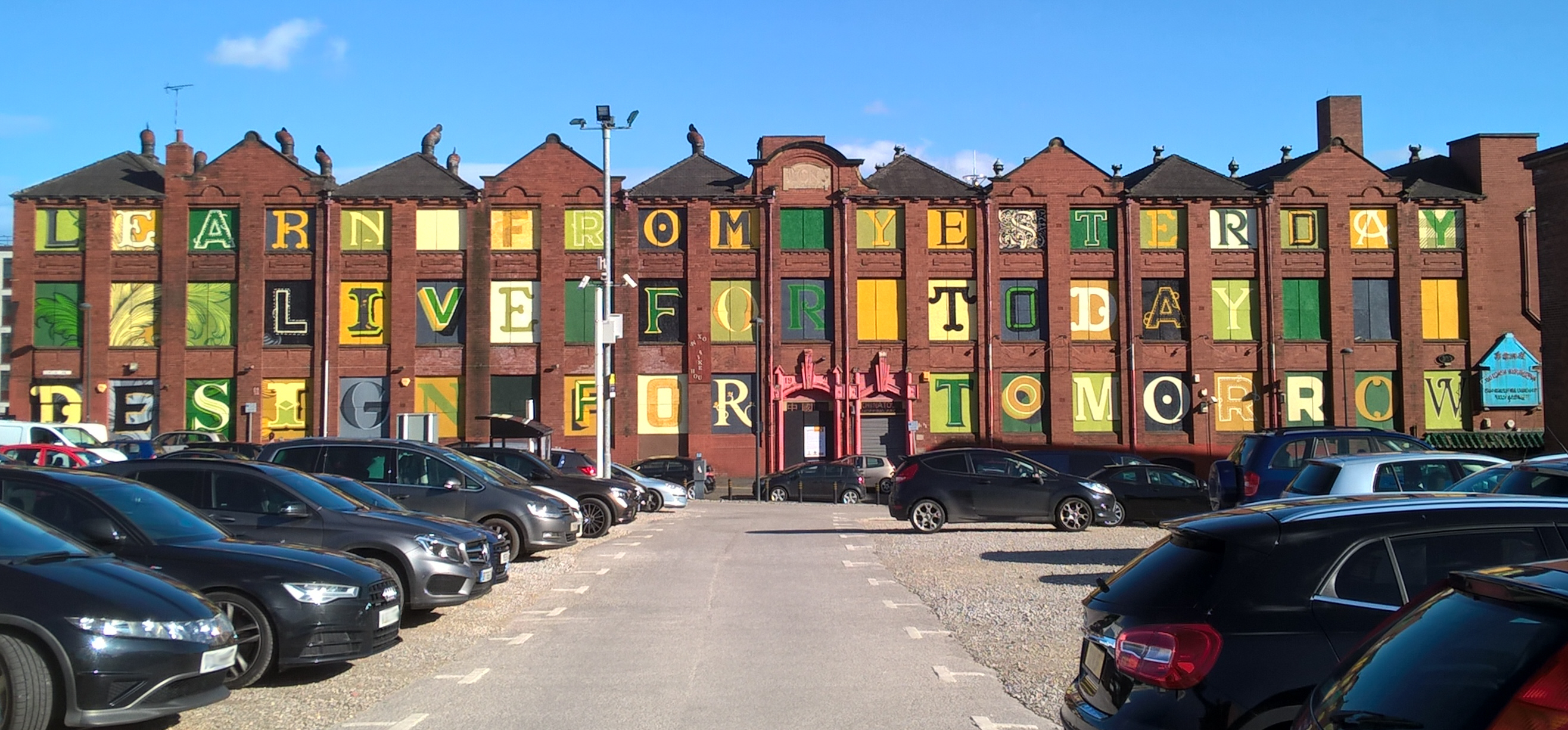
The Lyons Works and a civic car park

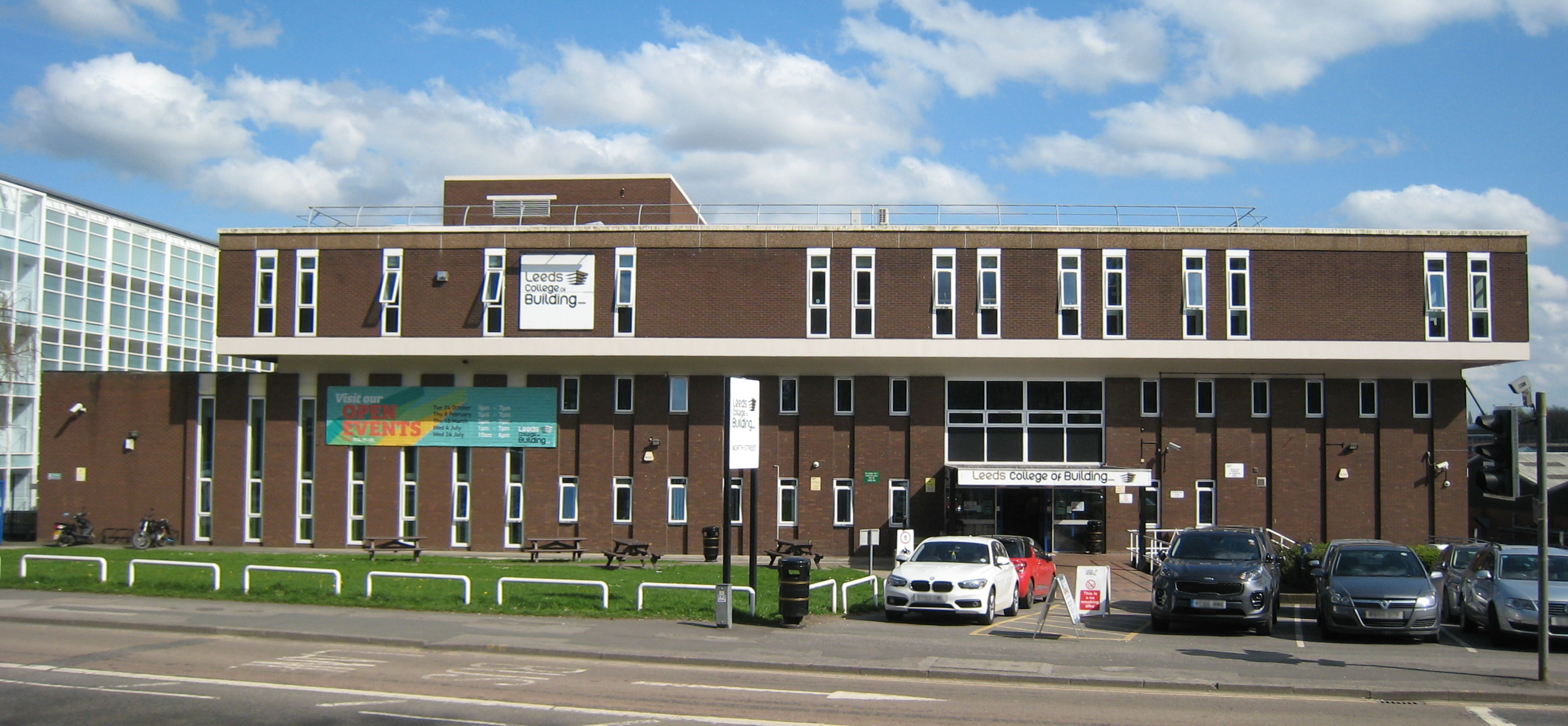
Leeds College of Building, North Street

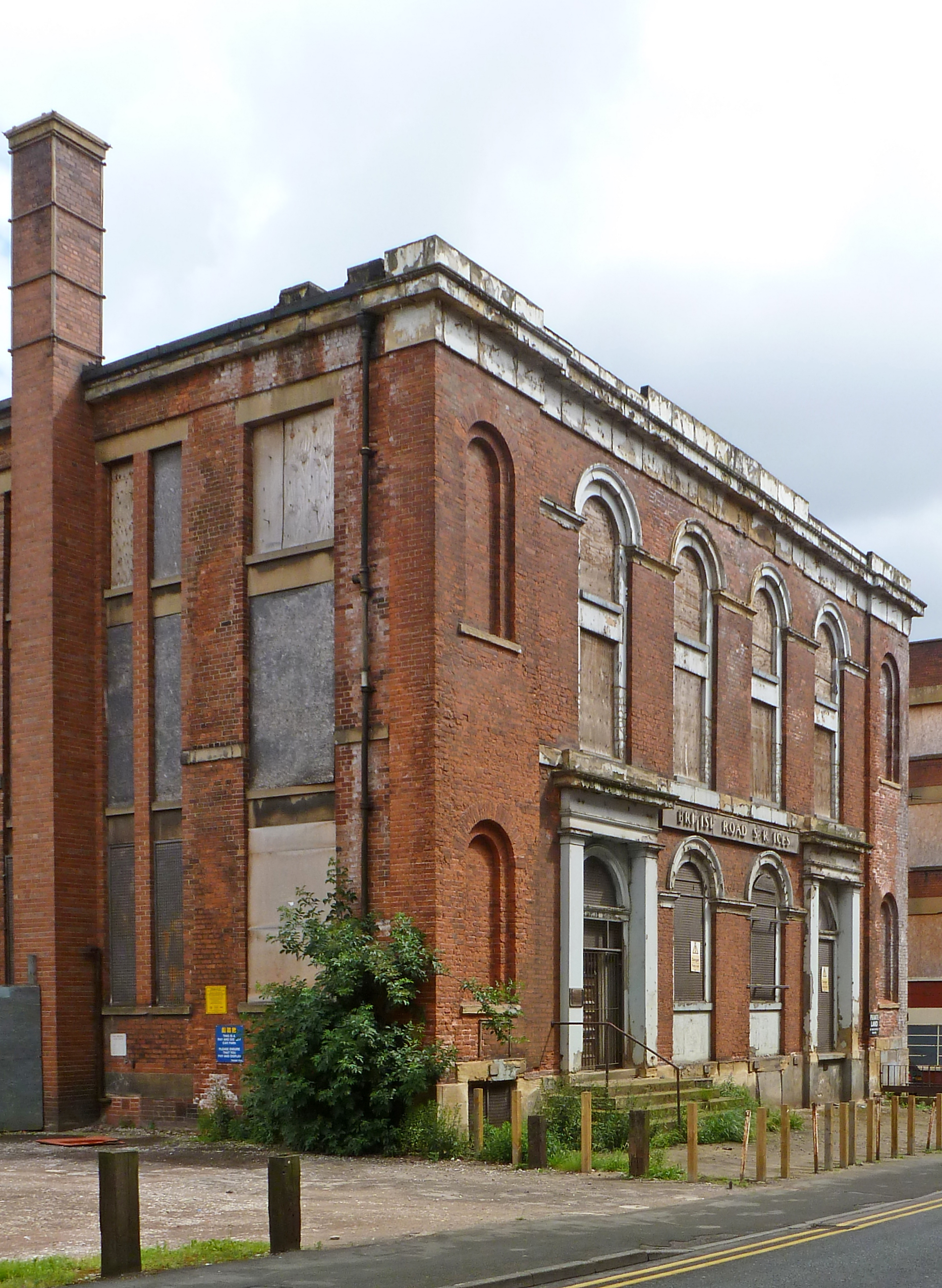
Templar House, former Methodist Chapel, Lady Lane
