= Mabgate =

Area of Leeds, West Yorkshire, England

Coordinates: 53.802°N 1.531°W

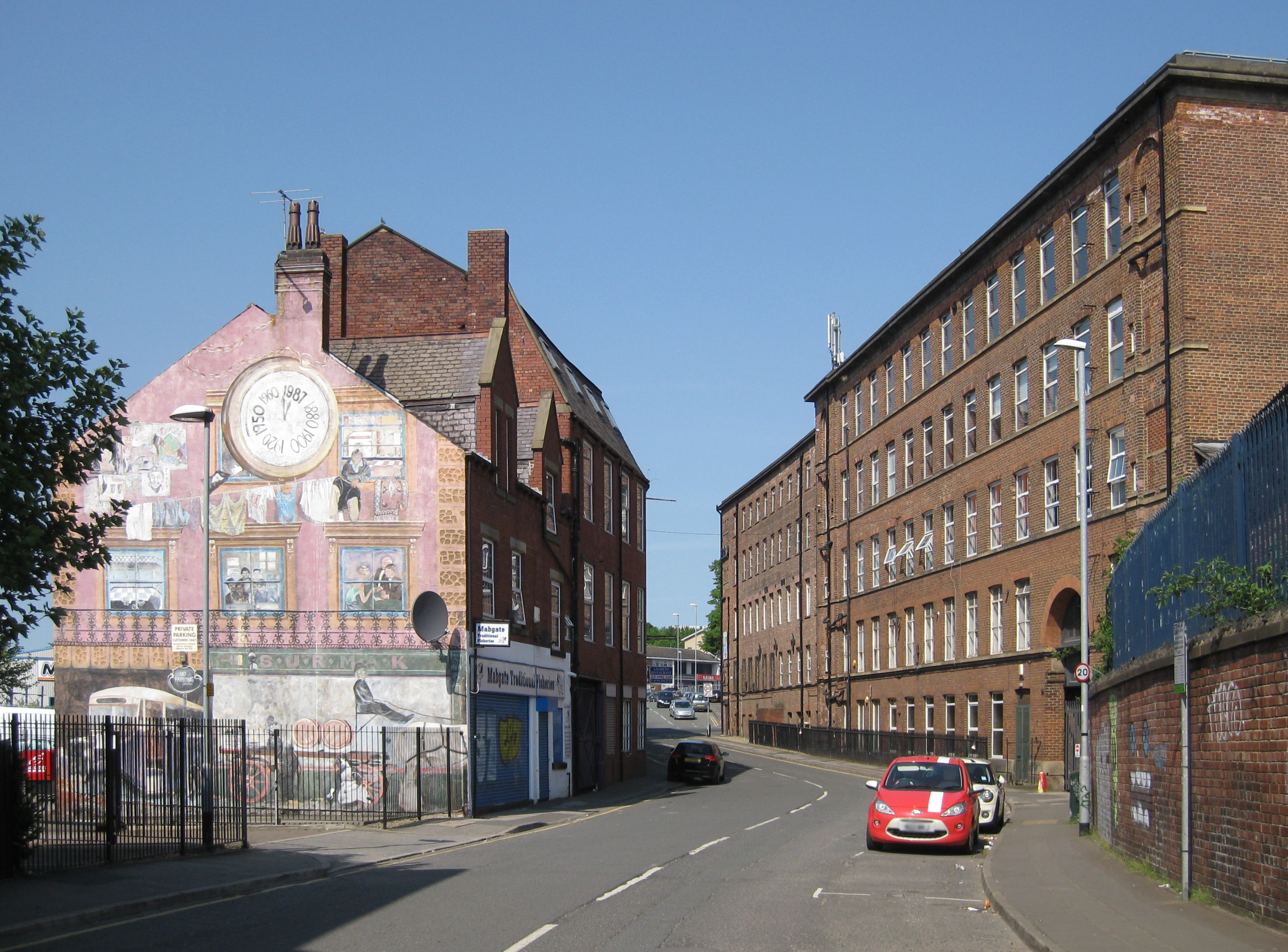
Mabgate looking west, with Mabgate Mills on the right and a 1987 mural, designed by Janet de Wagt

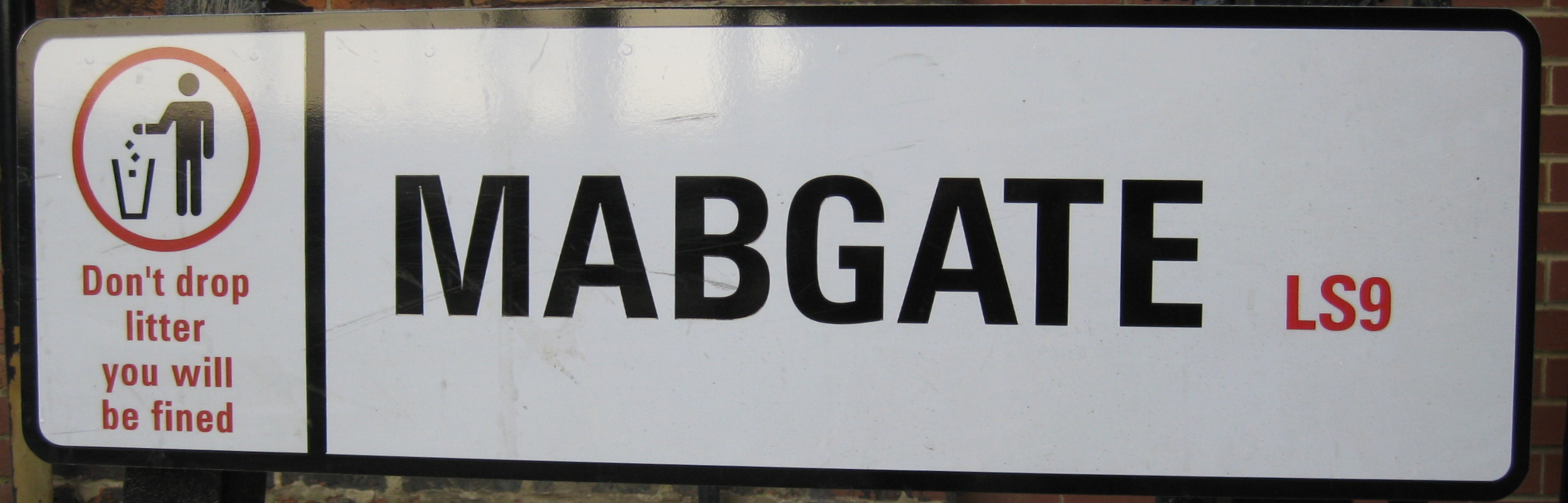
Street sign on the north end of the street

Mabgate is an inner city area of Leeds, West Yorkshire, England and the name of one of its streets. In Leeds City Council's Mabgate Development Framework (2007), "the area is bounded to the west by North Street; to the east by Macaulay Street; to the north by Mushroom Street and to the south by the New York Road". Mabgate, the street, continues for a short distance on the south side of New York Road (A64(M)). The area is in the Burmantofts and Richmond Hill ward of Leeds City Council. The area to the west of Regent Street is within the city centre boundary.

The name comes from 'Mab', meaning a prostitute (16th to 19th century) and 'gate' meaning a street (common in Yorkshire street names).

== Development ==
Mabgate Hall, built on the site which later became the Black Horse public house, was built in 1673. The area developed at the end of the 18th century when woollen mills were built along the Lady Beck or Mabgate Beck which runs parallel to Mabgate on the west. By 1850 the area had become densely packed with industrial premises and workers' houses. On the other side of the stream is the street called Mabgate Green. The area west of the Lady Beck was known as the Leylands, a mixture of slum housing and factories in the 19th and early 20th century.

Maps from 1725 and 1771 show the region as open land, but by 1821 a named street (as is Skinner Lane) with buildings along much of its length had been built. A Rebecca Chadwick, widow of William Chadwick, is noted as living there in 1790, implying that development started prior to this date.

The area today contains four listed buildings: two on Mabgate, the Hope Foundry, and its offices, Hope House, and two in the former Leylands, the Smithfield Hotel on North Street; and Crispin House on New York Road. The Hope Foundry produced ironwork for street furniture such as lamps, bollards, benches and mileposts, many of which are still around. The Black Horse public house was built on the site of Mabgate Hall as the Black Bull Inn. It was rebuilt in 1868 as the Black Horse. The City of Mabgate Inn was converted to flats in 2006. It dates from 1857: the green area opposite was a cholera burial ground.

In 2020 it was named by Condé Nast Traveller as one of the coolest places to live in the UK. Leeds City College acquired a site on the east of Mabgate in 2020 which is being developed as a college campus.

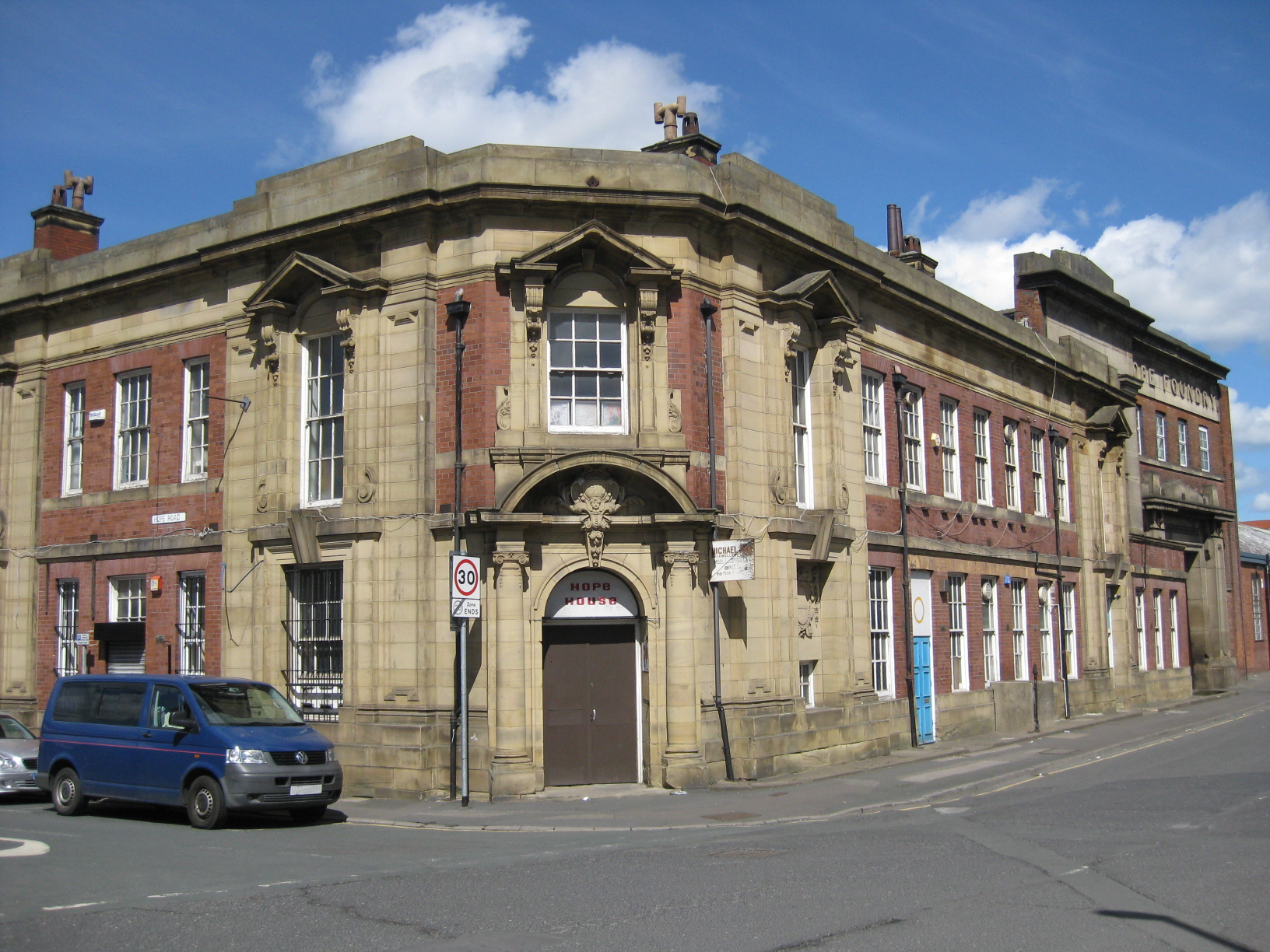
The Hope Buildings

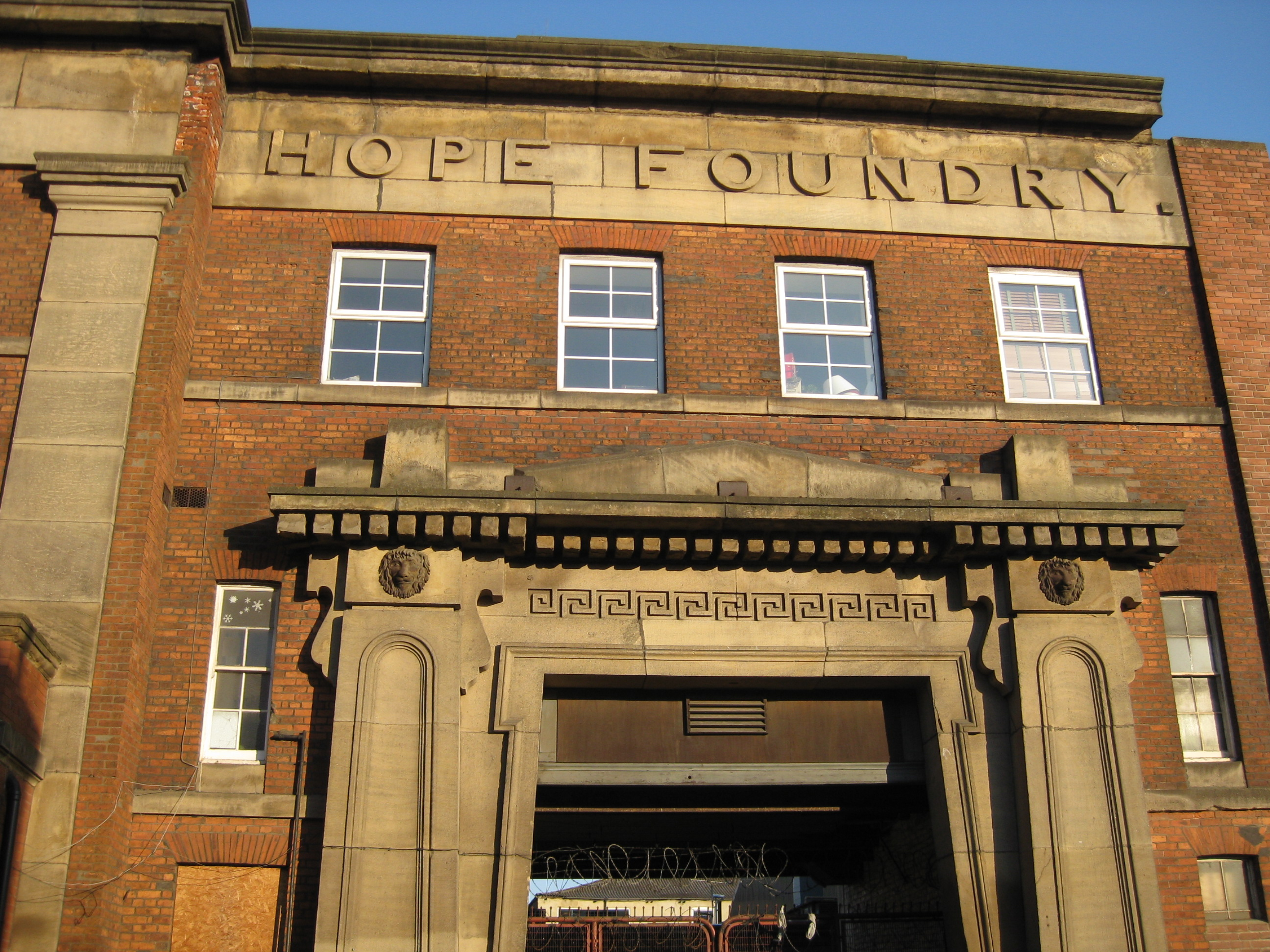
The Hope Foundry

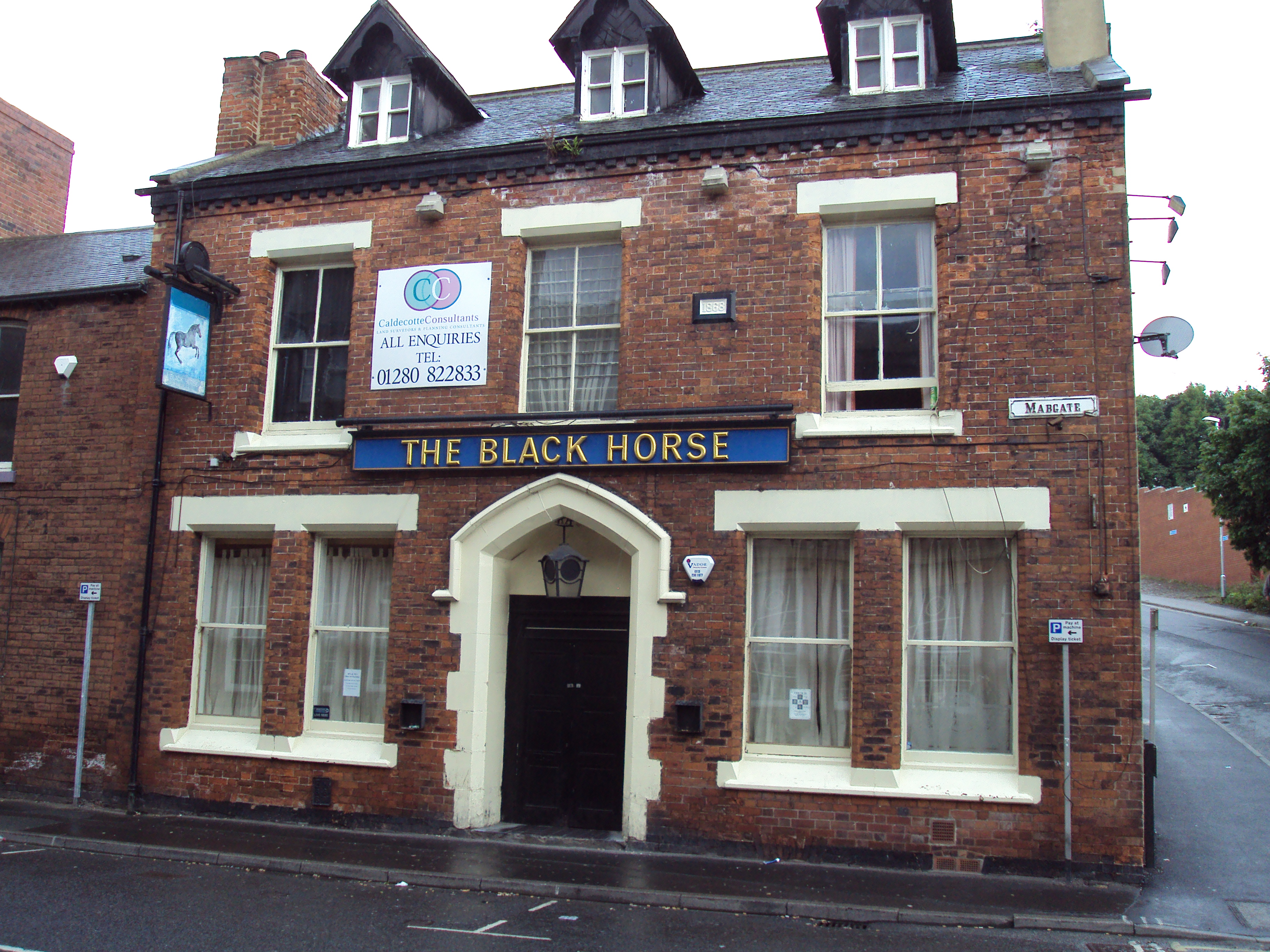
The Black Horse pub, Mabgate

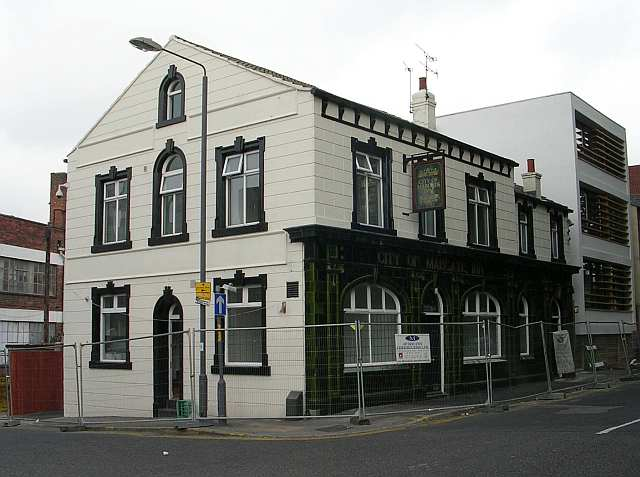
City of Mabgate Inn

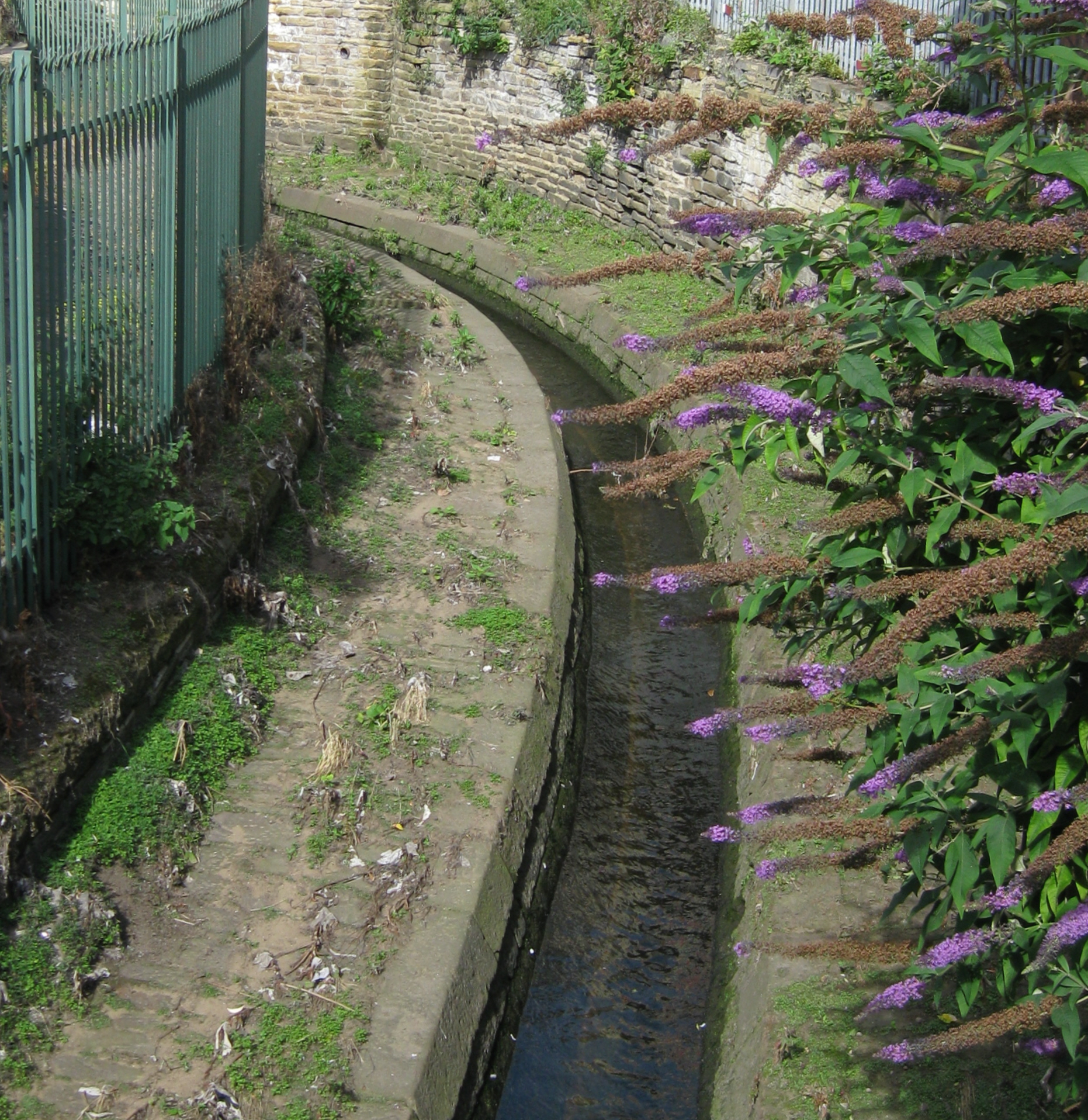
Lady Beck
