= 1926–27 Cardiff City F.C. season =

Welsh football club season

Cardiff City
1926–27 season
- Chairman: Walter Parker
- Manager: Fred Stewart
- Division One: 14th
- FA Cup: Winners
- Welsh Cup: Winners
- Top goalscorer: League: Hughie Ferguson (26); All: Hughie Ferguson (32)
- Highest home attendance: 25,387 (v Arsenal, 27 December 1926)
- Lowest home attendance: 10,057 (v Derby County, 16 March 1927)
- Average home league attendance: 15,424
Home colours

The 1926–27 season was the 26th season of competitive football played by Cardiff City F.C. and the team's sixth consecutive season in the First Division of the Football League. Having finished 16th the previous season, Fred Stewart made reshaped his squad but endured a slow start to the campaign. However, led by the goals of top scorer Hughie Ferguson, the club eased away from the relegation zone after the midway point of the campaign and finished in 14th position.

In the FA Cup, Cardiff beat Aston Villa and Darlington before overcoming reigning holders Bolton Wanderers. They required a replay to beat Chelsea in the quarter-finals and defeated Reading in the semi-final to reach their second FA Cup final in three years. In the final, Cardiff defeated Arsenal via a single goal from Ferguson. In doing so, they became the only team from outside England to have won the FA Cup in the competition's history. Cardiff also won the Welsh Cup for the fifth time in their history, beating Rhyl 2–0 in the final and achieving a unique feat of winning two national Cup competitions from different countries in the same season.

Billy Hardy made the most appearances for the club during the season with 52 in all competitions. Ferguson set a new club record with 32 goals in all competitions which stood until 2003 when Robert Earnshaw scored a total of 35. His tally of 26 in the league was also a club record which stood until 1947. The economic downturn in the South Wales area led to a drop in attendance figures with only three league matches at Ninian Park attracting more than 20,000 spectators.

== Background ==
Cardiff City had joined the Football League in 1920, entering the Second Division and winning promotion to the First Division in their first season. The club had come close to becoming the first team from outside England to win the First Division in 1923–24, losing the title on the final day of the season to Huddersfield Town on goal average. Two years later, Cardiff became the first Welsh side to reach an FA Cup final, playing in the 1925 final in which they lost 1–0 to Sheffield United. Such was the competitiveness of the side at the time that The Times labelled the team as "perhaps the best team in the country". These near misses with competition victories had raised hopes of a first trophy success in English football for the 1925–26 campaign. However, the team struggled to adapt to a new change in the offside law that had reduced the number of defenders between an attacking player and the goal from three to two. The change was an attempt to increase the number of goals being scored and, although the new rule had the desired effect (the goals per game average jumped by over 1, from 2.58 to 3.69), Cardiff struggled under the new format.

By October 1925 Cardiff were bottom of the First Division table, leading manager Fred Stewart to implement several changes to the squad. As well as dropping some first team players he signed three new forwards, Joe Cassidy from Bolton Wanderers, George McLachlan from Clyde and Hughie Ferguson from Motherwell. The £3,800 spent on Cassidy was a new club transfer record before Stewart broke the record again to sign Ferguson for £5,000. The trio provided fresh impetus in the squad and Ferguson's 19 league goals proved instrumental in helping the side avoid relegation and finish the campaign in 16th position.

Following the below par performances, Stewart initiated an overhaul of his playing squad during the off-season. The high-profile departures included Jack Evans, the club's first professional signing in 1910 who had been with the side for 16 years. Also leaving were Cassidy, less than a year after his £3,800 move and for a fee described in The Times as "substantially less" than the one paid for him, and Joe Nicholson, who had led the club's attack in the 1925 FA Cup Final. Several fringe players also left the club, including Herbie Evans, Alfie Hagan, Joe Hills, Denis Lawson, Jack Page and Ebor Reed. However, the most significant departure was club captain Jimmy Blair who joined A.F.C. Bournemouth for £3,900. His sale resulted in Fred Keenor being appointed the new captain of the first team. He had served as vice-captain under Blair and had filled the role on numerous occasions and was a popular choice for the position. Upon his appointment, the Football Echo remarked that Keenor was "a leader in every sense of the word, he commands respect of colleagues and sets an inspiring example by his wholehearted enthusiasm."

To compensate for the departures, Stewart made several signings for the first team. However, none of the transfers arriving were of a similar cost to the previous season's arrivals. As part of Cassidy's move to Dundee, Sam Irving moved to Cardiff. Ernie Curtis was signed from local amateur side Cardiff Corinthians while Tom Pirie from Aberdeen and Jim Baillie from Derry Celtic were also signed from the Scottish leagues. Goalkeeper Tom Wainwright was signed from non-League side Boston Town as back-up to Tom Farquharson after attracting attention in the team's FA Cup run the previous year. The most high-profile signing was the arrival of England international George Blackburn from Aston Villa in a swap deal with Nicholson. A change was also initiated at boardroom level with Syd Nicholls stepping down as chairman to be replaced by Walter Parker.

The season was preceded by the 1926 general strike, a protest against wage reductions and worsening work conditions for coal miners. Although the strike itself lasted for only nine days, some miners held out for several months as other industries returned to work. Coal mining was a major industry in the South Wales Valleys, a region where Cardiff drew a significant portion of its fanbase, and the collapse of the industry led to decreased ticket sales for the club. A standing ticket at one of the club's home fixtures cost one shilling, 10 per cent of a miner's daily pay at the time. The halt in production and declining sales of British industrial goods also affected Cardiff Docks, another prominent portion of the club's fanbase, which reduced its workforce. In an effort to lessen the impact on the club, Cardiff Council began operating a tram service directly to the ground.

== First Division ==
=== August–December ===
Cardiff began the campaign with an away match against Burnley on 28 August. The match was a highscoring affair; Ferguson, Cardiff's top goalscorer the previous year, opened his account with a brace and Len Davies added a third. However, Burnley scored four to take the opening day victory. Cardiff claimed their first point of the season two days later with a goalless draw with Leeds United. The side played their first home fixture on 4 September and worries over attendance figures due to the economic downturn in South Wales proved unfounded as more than 19,000 spectators attended a match against West Bromwich Albion. Some reports noted that fans were walking up to 20 miles to attend fixtures in order to save money on train fares. Len Davies scored his side's goal in a 1–1 draw. In the return fixture against Leeds on 6 September, Cardiff recorded their first win of the campaign with a 3–1 victory, Potter Smith and Willie Davies scored their first goals of the campaign while Ferguson added a third.

Results soon began to deteriorate in September. Despite a brace from Ferguson, Cardiff suffered a 3–2 home defeat to Aston Villa and this was followed a 2–0 defeat against Bolton Wanderers. Despite a 1–1 draw with Newcastle United on 20 September, Stewart initiated changes for a home match against Manchester United five days later, handing debuts to new signings Baillie, Curtis and Pirie and bringing in Tom Sloan for his first appearance of the season. The changes proved ineffectual however and Cardiff fell to a 2–0 defeat. The only one of Stewart's debutants to retain their place for the following match was 19-year-old Curtis, who scored his first goal for the club in a 6–3 defeat to fellow strugglers Derby County. Cardiff had been leading the match 3–2 at half time and The Times remarked that they looked the more likely to continue scoring at the start of the second half. However, when Derby equalised through a cross-shot, Cardiff's previous good efforts deserted them and Derby ran out winners, leaving Cardiff one place above the relegation zone.

A 3–0 victory over mid-table side Sheffield United on 9 October lifted Cardiff two places, Willie Davies, Irving and Ferguson with the goals. A goalless draw with Huddersfield preceded a three-match winning run that lifted the club to mid-table by the start of November. Cardiff opened with a 3–0 victory over Sunderland with a brace from Ferguson and one from Curtis. Bury were beaten 3–2 a week later, despite Keenor and Willie Davies missing the game on international duty. Another brace from Ferguson and McLachlan's first goal of the season secured victory. A 1–0 win over Birmingham on 6 November secured Cardiff's fourth win in five matches but the game was watched by a crowd of just over 10,000, the lowest home crowd of the year as early season optimism faded. Cardiff's winning run was brought to an end by a 4–1 defeat to Tottenham Hotspur on 13 November, the first time they had lost at White Hart Lane.

The return fixture against West Ham resulted in a 2–1 defeat soon after and Cardiff were dealt a further blow as Willie Davies made his final appearance of the season as he was ruled out indefinitely after contracting pleurisy and confined to a sanatorium. Cardiff's next fixture against Sheffield Wednesday was delayed for two days owing to heavy fog in the Yorkshire area. When the two teams did meet, Cardiff were beaten 3–0. The side's first win in more than a month, a 1–0 victory over fellow strugglers Everton lifted the side above the relegation zone. Concerned about his team's faltering performances, Stewart made several more additions to his squad in December, adding goalkeeper Tommy Hampson from Darlington and forwards Fred Castle and Frank Matson from Mid Rhondda and Reading respectively. Matson made his debut against Blackburn Rovers on 18 December and Castle against Newcastle a week later, but neither were able to stop the side falling to 1–0 and 5–0 defeats. Cardiff ended the calendar year with a 2–0 win over Arsenal following goals from Ferguson and Curtis. The match attracted the largest home crowd for a league fixture of the season with more than 25,000 in attendance.

=== January–May ===
Cardiff began the new calendar year with the reverse fixture against Arsenal on New Year's Day. Arsenal twice took the lead through Jimmy Brain but Cardiff equalised each time, first from Curtis and then by Len Davies. However, Brain completed his hat-trick to secure victory for his side and leave Cardiff one place above the relegation zone. Due to FA Cup commitments, Cardiff played only two further matches in the month, against Burnley on 15 January and Aston Villa on 31 January, with both matches ending in goalless draws. The results left Cardiff one point above the relegation zone, although they held three games in hand over 19th place Everton. During this period, a mixture of injury and poor form had seen the newly appointed captain Keenor dropped from the side. Frustrated at his lack of playing time over the Christmas and New Year period, he handed in a transfer request which was accepted at a board meeting on 19 January. Third Division South side Bristol Rovers opened talks over the transfer but the move ultimately collapsed.

Keenor was restored to the side for the club's first match in February and helped secure a 1–0 victory over Bolton, with Len Davies scoring Cardiff's winning goal. A 1–1 draw with Manchester United was followed by a 2–1 defeat of West Brom. A 3–1 defeat away to Sheffield United briefly derailed Cardiff's improved form but the side continued to see a marked improvement in results. They were aided by the arrival of forward Billy Thirlaway from Birmingham, a signing which allowed Stewart to move Ferguson to his natural centre-forward position, having been used to cover there since Willie Davies had been ruled out. Thirlaway made his debut on 12 March in a 2–2 draw with Sunderland, with Irving scoring both of Cardiff's goals. Ferguson rediscovered his goalscoring form after being switched and added a brace in a 2–0 win over Derby the following week in front of 10,057 spectators, the lowest league crowd of the season at Ninian Park. He added another in a 2–1 victory over Bury on 19 March, McLachlan scoring the other, and scored another brace in a 2–0 defeat of Huddersfield. These results meant Cardiff had lost only once since mid-January, winning five and drawing the remaining four of their previous ten fixtures, and had elevated the side to 12th place by the end of March.

Cardiff's run of form was brought to an end on 2 April as they fell to a 2–1 defeat against Tottenham, quickly followed by another defeat to Leicester. The club's progress in the FA Cup and Welsh Cup resulted in a congested fixture list in April. Two days after defeat to Leicester, Cardiff drew 2–2 with West Ham before suffering a 5–0 defeat to Liverpool on 15 April in a game where several first team players were rested. To catch up on their fixtures Cardiff played again the following day, beating Sheffield Wednesday 3–2, and again on 18 April, beating Liverpool 2–0 in the reverse fixture. The club's improved form and FA Cup run had led to an increase in attendances as interest rose with the Liverpool match attracting more than 21,000 spectators. During April, Ferguson set a new club record for league goals in a single season. A goal against Sheffield Wednesday equalled the 23 scored by Len Davies in the 1923–24 campaign before he surpassed the record in the win over Liverpool. He added a brace against Birmingham on 27 April to finish the season with 26 goals, a record that stood until 1946–47 when Stan Richards scored 30 goals. Another improved crowd watched Cardiff beat Everton 1–0 in their final home game of the season with Keenor scoring the only goal, before they finished the campaign with a 1–0 defeat to Blackburn. Cardiff finished in 14th place, 11 points clear of the relegation zone. While Cardiff enjoyed strong home form in which they conceded only 17 times at Ninian Park, the joint lowest in the division, the side was one of the lowest scoring in the top tier with only 15th placed Manchester United scoring fewer.

=== Partial league table ===
Pos	Team	Pld	W	D	L	GF	GA	GAv	Pts
12	Derby County	42	17	7	18	86	73	1.178	41
13	Tottenham Hotspur	42	16	9	17	76	78	0.974	41
14	Cardiff City	42	16	9	17	55	65	0.846	41
15	Manchester United	42	13	14	15	52	64	0.813	40
16	The Wednesday	42	15	9	18	75	92	0.815	39

Rules for classification: 1) Points; 2) Goal average; 3) Goals scored

=== Results by round ===
Round	1	2	3	4	5	6	7	8	9	10	11	12	13	14	15	16	17	18	19	20	21	22	23	24	25	26	27	28	29	30	31	32	33	34	35	36	37	38	39	40	41	42
Ground	A	A	H	H	H	A	H	H	A	H	A	H	A	H	A	H	A	H	A	H	A	H	A	H	A	H	A	A	A	A	H	H	H	H	A	A	A	H	H	A	H	A
Result	L	D	D	W	L	L	D	L	L	W	D	W	W	W	L	L	L	L	W	L	L	W	L	D	D	W	D	W	L	D	W	W	W	L	L	D	L	W	W	W	W	L
Position	14	14	16	8	14	18	17	18	20	18	16	14	12	11	13	16	17	18	17	19	20	19	20	20	20	18	19	17	18	19	18	14	12	13	14	15	17	15	12	12	11	14

A = Away; H = Home; W = Win; D = Draw; L = Loss

=== Match results ===
Key

- In result column, Cardiff City's score shown first
- H = Home match
- A = Away match
- pen. = Penalty kick
- o.g. = Own goal

Results

Date	Opponents	Result	Goalscorers	Attendance
28 August 1926	Burnley (A)	3–4	Ferguson (2), L. Davies	19,985
30 August 1926	Leeds United (A)	0–0		14,242
4 September 1926	West Bromwich Albion (H)	1–1	W. Davies	19,213
6 September 1926	Leeds United (H)	3–1	Ferguson (2), W. Davies	13,653
11 September 1926	Aston Villa (H)	2–3	Ferguson (2)	20,081
18 September 1926	Bolton Wanderers (A)	0–2		18,737
20 September 1926	Newcastle United (H)	1–1	P. Smith	14,048
25 September 1926	Manchester United (H)	0–2		17,267
2 October 1926	Derby County (A)	3–6	L. Davies, Ferguson, Curtis	21,216
9 October 1926	Sheffield United (H)	3–0	W. Davies, Irving, Ferguson	12,282
16 October 1926	Huddersfield Town (A)	0–0		17,705
23 October 1926	Sunderland (H)	3–0	Ferguson (2), Curtis	15,870
30 October 1926	Bury (A)	3–2	Ferguson (2), McLachlan	15,182
6 November 1926	Birmingham City (H)	1–0	McLachlan	10,598
13 November 1926	Tottenham Hotspur (A)	1–4	Curtis	15,350
20 November 1926	West Ham United (H)	1–2	W. Davies	10,736
29 November 1926	Sheffield Wednesday (A)	0–3		16,986
4 December 1926	Leicester City (H)	0–1		13,627
11 December 1926	Everton (A)	1–0	Ferguson	27,181
18 December 1926	Blackburn Rovers (H)	0–1		12,254
25 December 1926	Newcastle United (A)	0–5		36,250
27 December 1926	Arsenal (H)	2–0	Ferguson, Curtis	25,387
1 January 1927	Arsenal (A)	2–3	Curtis, L. Davies	31,000
15 January 1927	Burnley (H)	0–0		14,647
31 January 1927	Aston Villa (A)	0–0		10,481
5 February 1927	Bolton Wanderers (H)	1–0	L. Davies	12,721
12 February 1927	Manchester United (A)	1–1	Ferguson	26,213
21 February 1927	West Bromwich Albion (A)	2–1	McLachlan, Shaw (o.g.)	12,820
26 February 1927	Sheffield United (A)	1–3	L. Davies	25,658
12 March 1927	Sunderland (A)	2–2	Irving (2)	17,194
16 March 1927	Derby County (H)	2–0	Ferguson (2)	10,057
19 March 1927	Bury (H)	2–1	Ferguson, McLachlan	17,594
21 March 1927	Huddersfield Town (H)	2–0	Ferguson (2)	17,051
2 April 1927	Tottenham Hotspur (H)	1–2	Skitt (o.g.)	13,384
7 April 1927	Leicester City (A)	1–3	Ferguson	10,994
9 April 1927	West Ham United (A)	2–2	Ferguson, Wake	14,777
15 April 1927	Liverpool (A)	0–5		35,247
16 April 1927	Sheffield Wednesday (H)	3–2	Ferguson (2), Wake	13,426
18 April 1927	Liverpool (H)	2–0	Irving, Ferguson	21,668
27 April 1927	Birmingham City (A)	2–1	Ferguson (2)	23,681
30 April 1927	Everton (H)	1–0	Keenor	18,341
7 May 1927	Blackburn Rovers (A)	0–1		11,786

== Cup matches ==
=== FA Cup ===
Finalists two years earlier, Cardiff began their FA Cup campaign in the third round with a 2–1 win over fellow First Division side Aston Villa at Ninian Park. Cardiff had entered the game as underdogs, having won only two of their last nine matches, but goals from Len Davies and Curtis secured victory. In the fourth round, Cardiff were drawn against Third Division North side Darlington. The two sides had met in the competition two years earlier in which Cardiff required two replays to progress. In this meeting, Cardiff were able to win at the first attempt, with goals from Ferguson and McLachlan providing a 2–0 win. Cardiff met reigning holders Bolton in the fifth round, a team described as being "almost invincible at home" by The Times. Nearly 50,000 people attended the game at Burnden Park, as Cardiff were aggrieved early on after being denied a penalty. Bolton forward David Jack nearly opened the scoring as his shot hit the post before being cleared off the line. Keenor became the target of abuse from Bolton fans having injured Bolton's Jimmy Seddon in an international match a week before the match. Curtis later described how Keenor had led the team with an "inspirational" performance despite the barracking, commenting "The worse it got, the better and harder he played." Early in the second half, Cardiff were awarded a penalty after McLachlan's cross was handled by a Bolton defender. Ferguson converted the penalty and he provided an assist for Len Davies to seal the game, crossing for his teammate to head the second and final goal.

They were drawn against Second Division side Chelsea in the quarter-finals and the two sides played out a goalless draw at Stamford Bridge on 5 March, in a match affected by muddy playing conditions. The teams met again four days later in a replay at Ninian Park, again in torrential conditions. To compensate for the poor pitch state, Stewart focused his side's attack on long balls and the approach paid off quickly as Cardiff took a 2–0 lead through Irving and Len Davies. Chelsea were awarded a penalty shortly before half-time but Farquharson saved the effort with a unique approach. As Andrew Wilson prepared to take the kick, Farquharson stood at the back of his goal before charging forward to the goal line as Wilson began his run up and made what Wilson described as a "wonder save". Such was the effectiveness of Farquharson's tactics that the rules on goalkeepers movements before a penalty kick were ultimately restricted in the following years. Chelsea remained undiminished and pulled a goal back shortly before half time before equalising five minutes into the second half. Chelsea pushed forward and hit the crossbar but Cardiff retook the lead when Ferguson converted a penalty kick given for handball. They held on to the lead to win 3–2.

Cardiff faced Second Division opposition again in the semi-final, being drawn against Reading in a match played at a neutral venue, Molineux Stadium in Wolverhampton. Cardiff took the lead after 25 minutes through Ferguson before Harry Wake and a second from Ferguson secured a 3–0 win. Despite the team's attacking prowess, it was the half-back line of Keenor, Billy Hardy and Sloan that drew praise with the Daily Mirror reporting that the trio "dominated" the tie.

=== Final ===
First Division side Arsenal were Cardiff's opponents in the final at Wembley Stadium. Wake missed out on the game having suffered kidney damage in a league match against Sheffield Wednesday shortly before the final. His replacement was Curtis, who became the youngest player to appear in a cup final at the time, aged 19. Around 300,000 people applied for tickets to the final, with the crowd eventually numbering around 91,000. Arsenal opened the game in the ascendancy but Cardiff's defenders drew praise for containing the opposition threat.

The only goal of the game came after 74 minutes when Ferguson fired a hopeful shot towards the Arsenal goal only for goalkeeper Dan Lewis to let the ball slip out of his hands and into the net under pressure from the advancing Len Davies. Lewis later blamed the error on his jersey, claiming that due to it being new, the material was greasy and made it difficult to grip the ball. Cardiff held out for the remainder of the match to claim the trophy for the first time. By winning, Cardiff remain the only side from outside England to have ever won the FA Cup.

==== Match results ====
Key

- In result column, Cardiff City's score shown first
- H = Home match
- A = Away match
- N = Neutral venue
- pen. = Penalty kick
- o.g. = Own goal

Results

Date	Round	Opponents	Result	Goalscorers	Attendance
8 January 1927	Three	Aston Villa (H)	2–1	L. Davies, Curtis	30,000
29 January 1927	Four	Darlington (A)	2–0	McLachlan, Ferguson	12,986
19 February 1927	Five	Bolton Wanderers (A)	2–0	Ferguson, L.Davies	49,463
5 March 1927	Quarter-final	Chelsea (A)	0–0		70,184
9 March 1927	Quarter-final (replay)	Chelsea (H)	3–2	Irving, L.Davies, Ferguson (p)	47,583
26 March 1927	Semi-final	Reading (N)	3–0	Ferguson (2), Wake	39,476
23 April 1927	Final	Arsenal (N)	1–0	Ferguson	93,206

=== Welsh Cup ===
In the Welsh Cup, Cardiff began their competition against Ebbw Vale. In the first tie, the two sides recorded a goalless draw, necessitating a replay. In the return fixture, Cardiff dominated the game and ran out 6–1 winners, Len Davies and Castle scoring a brace each with McLachlan and Curtis adding the others. McLachlan and Len Davies each scored again in the following round as Cardiff defeated Barry Town 2–0. In the semi-final, Cardiff were drawn against Wrexham, with Len Davies continuing his scoring run in the competition, netting twice in a 2–1 victory. Cardiff defeated Rhyl 2–0 in the final, held at the Racecourse Ground, with goals from Len Davies, his sixth of the competition, and Irving. The victory was the fifth time Cardiff had won the Welsh Cup and completed an unusual double having won national cup competitions from different countries in the same year.

==== Match results ====
Key

- In result column, Cardiff City's score shown first
- H = Home match
- A = Away match
- N = Neutral venue
- pen. = Penalty kick
- o.g. = Own goal

Results

Date	Round	Opponents	Result	Goalscorers	Attendance
29 March 1927	Five	Ebbw Vale (A)	0–0		10,000
4 April 1927	Five (replay)	Ebbw Vale (H)	6–1	L. Davies (2), Castle (2), McLachlan, Curtis	8,000
28 April 1927	Six	Barry Town (H)	2–0	McLachlan, L. Davies	5,000
2 May 1927	Semi-final	Wrexham (H)	2–1	L. Davies (2)	14,600
5 May 1927	Final	Rhyl (N)	2–0	L. Davies, Irving	9,600

== Player details ==
Stewart used 26 players throughout the season in all competitions. Hardy made more appearances for the side than any other player, featuring in 52 matches. He missed only two fixtures during the campaign, playing in 40 of 42 league matches and all 12 matches of Cardiff's successful cup runs. Two others, Farquharson and Jimmy Nelson, also reached 50 appearances, playing 51 and 50 respectively, while McLachlan fell one short with 49.

Ferguson finished the season as the club's top goalscorer, with 32 goals in all competitions. His tally set a new club record for goals in a season, surpassing the 30 scored by Len Davies in the 1921–22 season. His record stood until 2003 when Robert Earnshaw scored 35 goals. Ferguson's 26 league goals was also a club record, again taking another record from Len Davies who scored 23 in 1923–24. Ferguson's league record was equalled by Jimmy McCambridge in 1931–32 before being beaten by Stan Richards in the 1946–47 season. Len Davies was the only other Cardiff player to reach double figures during the 1926–27 season, netting 16 times in all competitions. Ten players scored at least one goal during the campaign, as well as two opposition own goals.

=== Player statistics ===
Player	Position	First Division		FA Cup		Welsh Cup		Total	
Player	Position	Apps	Goals	Apps	Goals	Apps	Goals	Apps	Goals
Jim Baillie	HB	4	0	0	0	0	0	4	0
George Blackburn	HB	18	0	0	0	3	0	21	0
Fred Castle	FW	2	0	0	0	1	2	3	2
Elvet Collins	FW	3	0	0	0	0	0	3	0
Ernie Curtis	FW	26	5	6	1	4	1	36	7
Len Davies	FW	34	7	7	3	5	6	46	16
Willie Davies	FW	15	3	0	0	0	0	15	3
Tom Farquharson	GK	40	0	7	0	4	0	51	0
Hughie Ferguson	FW	39	26	7	6	1	0	47	32
Tommy Hampson	GK	2	0	0	0	1	0	3	0
Billy Hardy	HB	40	0	7	0	5	0	52	0
Sam Irving	FW	27	3	7	1	5	1	39	5
John Jennings	HB	5	0	0	0	0	0	5	0
Fred Keenor	DF	33	1	5	0	4	0	42	1
Frank Matson	FW	4	0	0	0	0	0	4	0
George McLachlan	FW	38	5	6	1	5	2	49	8
Jimmy Nelson	DF	38	0	7	0	5	0	50	0
Tom Pirie	HB	5	0	0	0	2	0	7	0
Percy Richards	FW	3	0	1	0	0	0	4	0
Tom Sloan	HB	20	0	7	0	4	0	31	0
Sam Smith	FW	2	0	0	0	0	0	2	0
Potter Smith	FW	8	2	0	0	0	0	8	2
Billy Thirlaway	FW	12	0	0	0	0	0	12	0
George Tysoe	FW	2	0	0	0	0	0	2	0
Harry Wake	HB	9	2	3	0	1	0	13	2
Tom Watson	DF	33	0	7	0	5	0	45	0

FW = Forward, HB = Halfback, GK = Goalkeeper, DF = Defender

== Aftermath ==
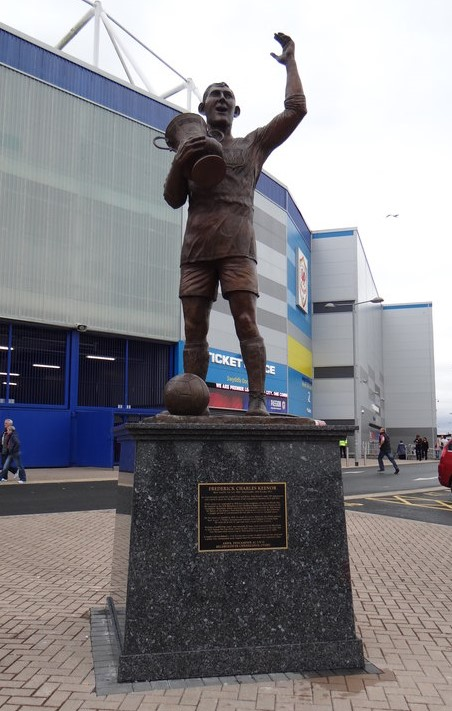
The statue of Keenor holding the FA Cup outside the Cardiff City Stadium

With the proceeds of their FA Cup victory, having earned more than £23,000 in gate receipts alone, the club installed a cover above the roof of the Grange End stand at Ninian Park. Although the decision left Stewart with little money to invest back into his team. As winners of the cup, the team were in increased demand and undertook a tour of Wales to display the trophy. They also took part in an exhibition match against Scottish Cup winners Celtic at Hampden Park. The match was poorly received however as only 6,000 fans attended with Cardiff losing 4–1. Their victory also qualified them to compete in the 1927 FA Charity Shield against amateur side Corinthians. Ferguson and Len Davies scored a goal each to win the trophy for Cardiff, also becoming the first team from outside England to win the Shield. A statue of Keenor lifting the FA Cup trophy was erected outside the club's new ground, the Cardiff City Stadium, in 2012.

Cardiff showed a major improvement in their league form the following year, finishing sixth in the First Division. They were unable to defend their FA Cup crown after being eliminated in the fifth round by Nottingham Forest but did retain the Welsh Cup by defeating Bangor 2–0 in the final.

== See also ==
- Cardiff City F.C. seasons
- 1926–27 in English football
