= 1925–26 Cardiff City F.C. season =

Welsh football club season

Cardiff City
1925–26 season
- Chairman: Sid Nicholls
- Manager: Fred Stewart
- Division One: 16th
- FA Cup: Fourth round
- Welsh Cup: Fifth round
- Top goalscorer: League: Hughie Ferguson (19); All: Hughie Ferguson (21)
- Highest home attendance: 25,539 (v Newcastle United, 21 November 1925)
- Lowest home attendance: 10,242 (v Manchester City, 2 January 1926)
- Average home league attendance: 17,946
Home colours

The 1925–26 season was the 25th year of competitive football played by Cardiff City F.C. and the team's fifth consecutive season in the First Division of the Football League. Having finished as runners-up in both the First Division and the FA Cup in the previous two seasons, the team's early optimism was misplaced as they finished in 16th position.

In the FA Cup, Cardiff progressed past Burnley in the third round but were eliminated by Newcastle United in the next round. The team were also knocked out of the Welsh Cup early on, losing to Merthyr Town. Willie Davies and Billy Hardy made the most appearances for the club during the season, both playing 39 times. Hughie Ferguson, who was signed for a club record £5,000 in November 1925, was the side's top goalscorer. He scored 21 times during the season, more than double the second highest player. The squad for the campaign contained a club record 16 players who had won at least one cap at international level.

== Background ==
Cardiff City entered the 1925–26 season with some optimism. The side had finished as runners-up to Huddersfield Town in the 1923–24 season on goal average and had reached the 1925 FA Cup Final before being defeated 1–0 by Sheffield United. The Football Echo was confident in the team's prospects for the campaign, writing "Supporters of Cardiff City are justified in believing that the team will do well this season." The paper attributed this to the settled nature of the squad, adding "All the players that contributed to the success of the club last year are again available ... The players know each other's styles to perfection, and in this respect they have the advantage over other clubs that have been compelled to introduce new talent."

Shortly before the start of the new season, the Football Association (FA) introduced changes to the offside rule that reduced the amount of defenders required between the attacker and goalkeeper from three to two. The change was designed to increase scoring opportunities, with Football League matches averaging 2.58 goals per game the previous year. In preparation for the law change, Cardiff played a trial match under the new regulations. The Football Echo reported that, during the game, the team had been "prompt with the opportunities that came their way" and expressed optimism that the law would benefit Cardiff's forwards.

Ahead of the new season, manager Fred Stewart made a handful of new signings. During a preseason tour in Ireland, he was impressed by Crusaders defender Tom Watson and promptly secured his addition. His teammate David Nelson, brother of Cardiff's Jimmy Nelson, was also signed from the tour. On returning to Wales, Stewart added Jack Jennings from Wigan Borough and Percy Richards from Merthyr Vale.

== First Division ==
Cardiff started the 1925–26 season with an away fixture against Manchester City on 29 August. More than 42,000 fans attended the fixture at Maine Road, the largest crowd Cardiff would play in front of all season, as the two sides entered the final five minutes tied at 2–2. Cardiff's captain, Jimmy Nelson became involved in a scuffle with an opposition forward and was subsequently shown a red card, becoming the first player in the club's history to be sent off. As the infringement took place in the Cardiff penalty area, Manchester City were also awarded a penalty kick, which Tommy Johnson converted to secure a 3–2 victory for his side. A second defeat followed two days later, as Cardiff lost 3–1 to West Ham United, with the Football Echo criticising the team by stating "they do not appear to have a fixed plan of campaign and they are not able in the circumstances to make profitable use of the advantages that should be theirs as a result of the alteration in the offside rule." The side registered their first win of the season in their next game, beating Everton 2–1 at Ninian Park following goals from Jimmy Gill and Harry Beadles.

A 1–0 defeat in the reverse fixture against West Ham was followed by the club's first point away from home as they drew 1–1 with Huddersfield Town. Cardiff took the lead through Willie Davies before Clem Stephenson equalised. Nelson had the opportunity to win the match for Cardiff but failed to convert a penalty in the second half. In their next match, Cardiff defeated in-form Tottenham Hotspur, inflicting their opponents' first defeat of the season with goals from Davies and Denis Lawson. However, the team soon entered a poor run of form, losing the return fixture against Tottenham 1–0 before being defeated by the same scoreline against league leaders Sunderland. This was followed by a heavy 6–3 defeat against Blackburn Rovers. The club enjoyed a brief respite by defeating Bury 3–2 with goals from Joe Nicholson, Len Davies and Beadles, although The Times noted it was "strange to find a team so good as Cardiff City so near the bottom of the table." Three straight defeats followed. The run began with a defeat against Birmingham in which Stewart experimented with team selection, including defender Fred Keenor at centre-forward. Cardiff took a 2–0 lead with goals from Willie Davies and Keenor but Birmingham recovered to take the victory, winning 3–2. A 5–0 defeat against Arsenal and a 2–0 loss against Manchester United left Cardiff bottom of the table at the end of October.

The Football Echo described how the Cardiff side had struggled to adapt to the new offside law change, writing "there are players who forget what is required of them under the new conditions, and adhere to the old methods." The team's struggles prompted wholesale changes from Stewart. Blair, Keenor and Willie Davies were absent due to international call-ups and Harry Wake was dropped from the defensive side of the line-up and the changes proved significant as they defeated Aston Villa 2–0. Stewart continued making changes and the club accepted an offer of £3,200 for Gill from Blackpool, the striker leaving after five years with Cardiff. The money was given to Stewart to reinvest in the squad and the directors provided further transfer funds as the manager reshaped the club's attack. Joe Cassidy was signed from Bolton Wanderers for £3,800 and George McLachlan from Clyde for £2,000. The most significant signing was the arrival of Hughie Ferguson from Motherwell for a club record fee of £5,000. The arrival of Ferguson was seen as a coup, with the Football Echo writing that the signing "was regarded as a triumph for Mr Fred Stewart ... for prevailing upon the Scottish officials to part with their star player". The new arrivals prompted a reshaping of the squad, with Beadles, Lawson and Jack Evans being largely omitted for the remainder of the season.

All three new signings started the Cardiff's next match against Leicester City and the trio combined to earn the club's first points at home for a month. Willie Davies and Ferguson opened the scoring for Cardiff before Cassidy completed a hat-trick in a 5–2 victory. A 1–0 defeat to Leeds United followed, but a goalless draw with Newcastle United on 21 November was enough to lift the side above the relegation zone. A 1–0 victory over Bolton Wanderers began a much improved run of form for Cardiff who went on to win three of their five matches in December, led largely by the goals of Ferguson and Len Davies. A brace from Ferguson secured a 2–1 victory over Notts County before Ferguson and Len Davies scored one each to beat Liverpool a week later. The pair each scored again in a 3–2 defeat to bottom-placed Burnley, before Cardiff recovered to beat West Bromwich Albion 3–2. Len Davies opened the scoring, his third in three games, before another brace from Ferguson secured his seventh goal in five matches. His scoring run was brought to an end in the reverse fixture against West Brom, who won 3–0 on 26 December. Despite the defeat, Cardiff ended the calendar year in 16th place.

On New Year's Day 1926, Cardiff travelled to play Sheffield United, suffering a heavy 11–2 defeat. The result remains the biggest defeat in Cardiff's history. Despite the damning nature of the defeat, the team rallied after the game and secured a 2–2 draw with Manchester City the following day, Cassidy scoring both of his side's goals, and a 1–1 draw with Everton 2 weeks later, McLachlan adding his first for the club. The side ended January with a 2–1 defeat to Huddersfield, having initially led 1–0 at half time, although the team was hampered by several injuries to first team players.

Cardiff began February with a 4–1 victory over Blackburn Rovers, Len Davies and Cassidy giving Cardiff the lead before McLachlan added a brace. A 4–1 defeat away to Bury briefly interrupted form, but the club began a seven-match unbeaten run with a 2–0 win over Birmingham with goals from Ferguson and Len Davies. A goalless draw with Arsenal to end February and a victory over Aston Villa in March raised hopes that Cardiff had overcome their struggles to adapt to the new offside rule and the tactical changes it required. This coincided with Keenor's return to the side, with one report stating how there had been "justification for the belief that he could not adapt" but this had now "come to an end". This form continued, with victories over Leicester City and third placed Sunderland and a goalless draw with Leeds beginning to ease Cardiff away from the relegation zone. A single goal by Ferguson secured victory over Newcastle on 3 April before consecutive 1–0 defeats to Sheffield United and Bolton ended the club's unbeaten run. Ferguson scored his first hat-trick for the club on 17 April, helping Cardiff to a 4–2 win over Notts County, Keenor adding his side's fourth. Billy Hardy scored his first goal of the season in a 2–2 draw with Liverpool before Cardiff ended their campaign with away defeats to Manchester United and Burnley, finishing in 16th place.

=== Partial league table ===
Pos	Team	Pld	W	D	L	GF	GA	GAv	Pts
14	Birmingham	42	16	8	18	66	81	0.815	40
15	Tottenham Hotspur	42	15	9	18	66	79	0.835	39
16	Cardiff City	42	16	7	19	61	76	0.803	39
17	Leicester City	42	14	10	18	70	80	0.875	38
18	West Ham United	42	15	7	20	63	76	0.829	37

Rules for classification: 1) Points; 2) Goal average; 3) Goals scored

=== Match results ===
Key

- In result column, Cardiff City's score shown first
- H = Home match
- A = Away match
- pen. = Penalty kick
- o.g. = Own goal

Results

Date	Opponents	Result	Goalscorers	Attendance
29 August 1925	Manchester City (A)	2–3	Gill, Beadles	42,539
31 August 1925	West Ham United (A)	1–3	Nicholson	16,129
5 September 1925	Everton (H)	2–1	Gill, Beadles	13,914
7 September 1925	West Ham United (H)	0–1		19,462
12 September 1925	Huddersfield Town (A)	1–1	W. Davies	19,033
14 September 1925	Tottenham Hotspur (A)	2–1	W. Davies, Lawson	26,716
21 September 1925	Tottenham Hotspur (H)	0–1		20,698
23 September 1925	Sunderland (H)	0–1		18,316
26 September 1925	Blackburn Rovers (A)	3–6	Nicholson (2), Beadles	18,042
3 October 1925	Bury (H)	3–2	Nicholson, L. Davies, Beadles	20,281
10 October 1925	Birmingham (A)	2–3	W. Davies, Keenor	24,335
17 October 1925	Arsenal (A)	0–5		38,130
24 October 1925	Manchester United (H)	0–2		15,846
31 October 1925	Aston Villa (A)	2–0	Nicholson, S. Smith	33,161
7 November 1925	Leicester City (H)	5–2	W. Davies, Ferguson, Cassidy (3)	25,089
14 November 1925	Leeds United (A)	0–1		19,360
21 November 1925	Newcastle United (H)	0–0		25,539
28 November 1925	Bolton Wanderers (A)	1–0	Ferguson	21,520
5 December 1925	Notts County (H)	2–1	Ferguson	17,856
12 December 1925	Liverpool (A)	2–0	L. Davies, Ferguson	31,373
19 December 1925	Burnley (H)	2–3	L. Davies, Ferguson	17,678
25 December 1925	West Bromwich Albion (H)	3–2	L. Davies, Ferguson (2)	13,683
26 December 1925	West Bromwich Albion (A)	0–3		35,504
1 January 1926	Sheffield United (A)	2–11	W. Davies, L. Davies	21,943
2 January 1926	Manchester City (H)	2–2	Cassidy (2)	10,242
16 January 1926	Everton (A)	1–1	McLachlan	26,553
23 January 1926	Huddersfield Town (H)	1–2	Ferguson	13, 049
6 February 1926	Blackburn Rovers (H)	4–1	L. Davies, Cassidy, McLachlan (2)	16, 484
13 February 1926	Bury (A)	1–4	Ferguson	16, 777
20 February 1926	Birmingham (H)	2–0	L. Davies, Ferguson	18, 862
27 February 1926	Arsenal (H)	0–0		21,684
13 March 1926	Aston Villa (H)	2–0	Ferguson (2)	21,984
20 March 1926	Leicester City (A)	2–1	W. Davies (2)	24,095
27 March 1926	Leeds United (H)	0–0		15,300
31 March 1926	Sunderland (A)	3–1	W. Davies, L. Davies, Ferguson	4,315
3 April 1926	Newcastle United (A)	1–0	Ferguson	26,209
5 April 1926	Sheffield United (H)	0–1		22,241
10 April 1926	Bolton Wanderers (H)	0–1		13,787
17 April 1926	Notts County (A)	4–2	Ferguson (3), Keenor	8,712
24 April 1926	Liverpool (H)	2–2	Hardy, Ferguson	14,868
28 April 1926	Manchester United (H)	0–1		9,116
1 May 1926	Burnley (A)	1–4	L. Davies	16,381

== Cup matches ==
=== FA Cup ===
As FA Cup finalists the previous year, Cardiff held ambitions of again competing for the trophy at the start of the competition. The club's performances in the FA Cup in recent seasons led The Times to describe them as "stubborn Cup fighters" ahead of their first game. The side entered in the third round against fellow First Division team Burnley. The first meeting between the two sides at Ninian Park ended in a 2–2 draw, Cassidy and Len Davies scoring for Cardiff. In the replay, Cardiff secured a 2–0 victory at Turf Moor following a brace from Ferguson. However, they were eliminated in the fourth round after suffering a 2–0 defeat to Newcastle United.

==== Match results ====
Key

- In result column, Cardiff City's score shown first
- H = Home match
- A = Away match
- N = Neutral venue
- pen. = Penalty kick
- o.g. = Own goal

Results

Date	Round	Opponents	Result	Goalscorers	Attendance
9 January 1925	Third	Burnley (H)	2–2	Cassidy, L. Davies	30,000
13 January 1925	Third (replay)	Burnley (A)	2–0	Ferguson (2)	26,811
30 January 1925	Fourth	Newcastle United (H)	0–2		42,000

=== Welsh Cup ===
Cardiff entered the Welsh Cup in the fifth round but suffered an early exit after losing 2–1 to Third Division North side Merthyr Town.

==== Match results ====
Key

- In result column, Cardiff City's score shown first
- H = Home match
- A = Away match
- pen. = Penalty kick
- o.g. = Own goal

Results

Date	Round	Opponents	Result	Goalscorers	Attendance
5 March 1926	Fifth	Merthyr Town (A)	1–2	Ferrans (OG)	4,000

== Player details ==
During the season, manager Fred Stewart used 28 players in all competitions. Willie Davies and Hardy made the most appearances, each playing in 39 matches, while Len Davies and Nelson made one less appearance with 38. Two players, Alfie Hagan and Harry McCracken, made only a single appearance for the club. McCracken's appearance in the Welsh Cup was his only game for the side. Despite signing for Cardiff midway through the season, Ferguson was the club's top goalscorer, netting 21 times in all competitions. Author James Leighton notes that without Ferguson's goals "Cardiff would probably have been relegated". No other player reached double figures for goals during the campaign, Willie and Len Davies were both tied for second with nine goals each. In total, 13 players scored at least once during the campaign for Cardiff. The squad for the season contained 16 players with at least one cap at international level, a club record, while Tom Watson also won his first cap at the end of the campaign.

=== Player statistics ===
Player	Position	First Division		FA Cup		Welsh Cup		Total	
Player	Position	Apps	Goals	Apps	Goals	Apps	Goals	Apps	Goals
Harry Beadles	FW	6	4	0	0	0	0	6	4
Jimmy Blair	DF	16	0	1	0	1	0	18	0
Joe Cassidy	FW	24	6	3	1	1	0	28	7
Elvet Collins	FW	6	0	0	0	0	0	6	0
Len Davies	FW	37	8	1	1	0	0	38	9
Willie Davies	FW	36	9	2	0	1	0	39	9
Herbie Evans	HB	3	0	0	0	0	0	3	0
Jack Evans	FW	7	0	0	0	0	0	7	0
Tom Farquharson	GK	33	0	0	0	1	0	34	0
Hughie Ferguson	FW	26	19	3	2	0	0	29	21
Jimmy Gill	FW	11	2	0	0	0	0	11	2
Alfie Hagan	FW	1	0	0	0	0	0	1	0
Billy Hardy	HB	37	1	2	0	0	0	39	1
Joe Hills	GK	9	0	3	0	0	0	12	0
John Jennings	DF	2	0	0	0	0	0	2	0
Fred Keenor	DF	25	2	0	0	0	0	25	2
Denis Lawson	FW	20	1	2	0	1	0	23	1
Harry McCracken	FW	0	0	0	0	1	0	1	0
George McLachlan	FW	19	2	3	0	1	0	23	2
Jimmy Nelson	DF	34	0	3	0	1	0	38	0
Joe Nicholson	HB/FW	18	6	3	0	1	0	22	6
Jack Page	DF	3	0	0	0	0	0	3	0
Ebor Reed	DF	6	0	0	0	1	0	7	0
Tom Sloan	DF	28	0	3	0	0	0	31	0
Sam Smith	FW	2	1	1	0	0	0	3	2
Potter Smith	FW	8	1	0	0	0	0	8	1
Harry Wake	HB	15	0	0	0	1	0	16	0
Tom Watson	DF	30	0	3	0	0	0	33	0

FW = Forward, HB = Halfback, GK = Goalkeeper, DF = Defender

== Aftermath ==
The team's struggles during the season led Stewart to reshape his squad at the end of the campaign. Jack Evans, Cardiff's first ever signing upon his arrival in 1910, left the club after 16 years. Cassidy, who had only joined the club midway through the season, returned to his Scotland. He had struggled with form since leaving his native country after a severe bout of influenza caused him to lose 22 pounds (10.0 kg) in weight. Several other players also left the club, including Herbie Evans, Alfie Hagan, Joe Hills, Lawson, Nicholson, Jack Page and Ebor Reed.

Club captain Blair also departed, with Keenor being appointed in his place. Keenor went on to captain Cardiff to victory in the 1927 FA Cup Final the following season, as the club became the only team from outside England to win the competition in its history.
