= Tom Watson (footballer, born 1900) =

Association football player (1902–1978)

Personal information
- Full name: Thomas Houston Watson
- Date of birth: 4 October 1900
- Place of birth: Belfast, Northern Ireland
- Date of death: 13 May 1978 (aged 77)
- Place of death: Newtownabbey, Northern Ireland
- Height: 5 ft 8 in (1.73 m)

Youth career
- Glenarm

Senior career*
Years	Team	Apps	(Gls)
–1925	Crusaders		
1925–1929	Cardiff City	85	(0)
1929–1932	Linfield		
1932–1934	Crusaders		

International career
1926	Ireland	1	(0)

Managerial career
- 1934–: Whiteabbey
- * Club domestic league appearances and goals

Thomas Houston Watson (4 October 1900 – 13 May 1978) was an Irish professional footballer. He began his career with Irish Intermediate League side Crusaders as a half back before joining Cardiff City in 1925 where he converted to defence. He became a regular first team player during his debut season in the Football League and later played in the 1927 FA Cup Final, helping the side become the only team from outside England to win the competition.

He made more than 100 appearances for Cardiff in all competitions until a cartilage injury cost him his place in the side. He returned to Ireland with Linfield, winning a league and cup double in his first season. He later returned to play for Crusaders before managing amateur side Whiteabbey, where he won the Irish Football Alliance in his first season. He later became a referee. Watson also won a single cap for Ireland, in a match against Scotland in 1926, and played for representative sides of both the Irish Intermediate League and Welsh League during his career.

== Early life ==
Watson was born in Belfast on 4 October 1900 to Janet and William James Watson. His father worked as a caulker.

== Club career ==
=== Early years ===
Watson began his football career as a youth player with Glenarm before joining Irish Intermediate League side Crusaders. His performances for the side led to him being selected to represent an Intermediate League XI in matches against their counterparts from other leagues, including captaining the side against a Yorkshire League XI in February 1925. Crusaders had previously sold Jimmy Nelson, a childhood friend of Watson, to Cardiff City in 1921 where the Scotsman had impressed. Cardiff subsequently approached Crusaders to enquire "Have you any more players like Jimmy?". This correspondence ultimately led to Watson and Tom Sloan joining Cardiff.

=== Cardiff City ===
Watson signed for the Welsh side in August 1925 on a free transfer. During his time with Crusaders, he had played as a half back but on arrival at Cardiff, the club's coaching staff believed he would be more suited to a defensive role. He was trialled in the new position for several reserve matches and impressed the club enough for the change to be made permanent.

He began the 1925–26 season as cover for club captain Jimmy Blair from the side. He made his debut for the club in a 1–0 victory over West Ham United on 7 September 1925 in place of Blair. Starting alongside Nelson, the Belfast Telegraph noted that the pair were "sorely tried". His second appearance came more than a month later in a 5–0 defeat to Arsenal again in place of the injured Blair. Despite the heavy defeat, Watson earned praise in match reports and maintained his place in the side. Despite only appearing in one further match, Watson was selected for a Welsh League XI to play their counterparts from the Irish League in Swansea on 31 October. He missed only three further games during the remainder of the campaign for Cardiff, making a total of 33 appearances in all competitions during the year as he formed a defensive partnership with Nelson. His form led the club to transfer list Blair in the first half of the season before selling him towards the end of the year.

In his second season with Cardiff, Watson made a further 45 appearances in all competitions, including playing in all seven matches of their successful FA Cup run. Ahead of the final, Watson was described as "one of the best tacklers playing this season" in the Daily Herald. The newspaper also noted that his partnership with Nelson formed one of the "best pairs of backs in the country." Cardiff defeated Arsenal 1–0 to become the only team from outside England to win the competition. He remained prominent during the first half of the 1927–28 season, missing only 2 of the first 20 league matches of the campaign. However, from late December, his season was blighted by injuries; he made only two appearances in the second half of the campaign, the second in a heavy 7–1 defeat against Derby County on 31 March 1928. He underwent knee surgery in October 1928 in attempt to rectify his cartilage injury problems, having not made an appearance during the new season. As such, he appeared only once during the 1928–29 campaign, returning in a 3–1 defeat to Manchester City in the final month of the campaign.

His injury problems and the form of his replacement William Roberts led to his departure from the club as he was unable to regain his place. At the end of the season Watson was placed on the transfer list, along with Sloan. Watson received interest from Fulham and Derry City who both made approaches, with Cardiff seeking around £500 for the transfer. However, Watson was instead transferred to Linfield along with Sloan.

=== Return to Ireland ===
In his first year with Linfield, he helped the side to a double by winning both the Irish League and Irish Cup. In the final of the cup, on 29 March 1930, Linfield secured a 4–3 victory over Ballymena United. Watson was involved in a clash of heads with Ballymena player Kilpatrick with the score tied at 3–3 which left the opposition player unable to continue. The Belfast News Letter reported that the incident had likely turned the game in Linfield's favour, writing "Had that accident not happened, Ballymena would, in all probability, have got the winning goal."

The Irish Cup victory completed an unusual treble of winning the major cup competition in three countries after already having won the FA Cup and the Welsh Cup. He remained with Linfield until August 1932 when he returned to his first club Crusaders.

== International career ==
Watson represented Ireland at youth level before receiving his first call-up to the senior side in February 1926, following a number of withdrawals due to injury, for a match against Scotland. Ireland lost the match 4–0.

== Later life ==
After retiring from playing, Watson managed amateur side Whiteabbey and also served on the club's committee. In his first season in charge, he led the club to the Irish Football Alliance title. His success saw him named on a three-man shortlist for the vacant managerial role at Bangor. He later became a referee in the Irish Junior League, officiating his first match in September 1938. Watson married his partner Daisy and the couple had four children. He died at his home in Newtownabbey in May 1978 at the age of 77.

== Career statistics ==
Appearances and goals by club, season and competition
Club	Season	League			FA Cup		Welsh Cup		Total	
Club	Season	Division	Apps	Goals	Apps	Goals	Apps	Goals	Apps	Goals
Cardiff City	1925–26	First Division	30	0	3	0	0	0	33	0
Cardiff City	1926–27	First Division	33	0	7	0	5	0	45	0
Cardiff City	1927–28	First Division	21	0	1	0	1	0	23	0
Cardiff City	1928–29	First Division	1	0	0	0	0	0	1	0
Total			85	0	11	0	6	0	102	0

== Honours ==
=== Player ===
Cardiff City

- FA Cup: 1926–27
- Welsh Cup: 1927

Linfield

- Irish League: 1929–30
- Irish Cup: 1930

=== Manager ===
Whiteabbey

- Irish Football Alliance: 1934–35
