= Tom Sloan (footballer, born 1900) =

Northern Ireland footballer (1900–1973)

Personal information
- Full name: Thomas Milne Sloan
- Date of birth: 11 September 1900
- Place of birth: Portadown, Ireland
- Date of death: 2 June 1973 (aged 72)
- Place of death: Lurgan, Northern Ireland
- Height: 5 ft 9 in (1.75 m)
- Position: Half back

Senior career*
Years	Team	Apps	(Gls)
1921–1924	Crusaders		
1924–1929	Cardiff City	79	(1)
1929–1932	Linfield		
1932	Portadown		

International career
1925–1931	Ireland	11	(0)

Managerial career
- 1932–1937: Portadown
- 1937–1938: Linfield
- 1938–1939: Portadown
- 1947–1948: Portadown
- 1952–1953: Portadown
- * Club domestic league appearances and goals

Thomas Milne Sloan (11 September 1900 – 2 June 1973) was an Irish professional footballer who played as a half back. He began his career in Northern Ireland with Irish Intermediate League side Crusaders while also serving as a policeman. He joined Football League First Division side Cardiff City in 1924 where he spent five years and made more than 90 appearances in all competitions. His playing time with the club was often limited due to competition with club captain Fred Keenor, but he did play for the side in the 1927 FA Cup Final as they defeated Arsenal to become the only team from outside England to win the competition.

After falling out of favour, he returned to Northern Ireland in 1929 to join Linfield and captained the side to both the Irish League and Irish Cup titles in his first two seasons. In 1932, he was appointed player-manager of Portadown and led the club to their first senior trophy since joining the Intermediate League by winning the Gold Cup in 1934. He also achieved the highest points total in the club's history during the 1936–37 season. His success led to his appointment as manager of Linfield in 1937, but he returned to Portadown after a year.

In 1939, Sloan stepped down as Portadown manager to enlist in the Royal Army Service Corps during World War II. He served for two years before being discharged due to injuries sustained in an accident. After the war, he had two short spells as Portadown manager and also coached at the club for many years. He also won 11 caps for the Ireland national team during his career.

== Club career ==
=== Crusaders ===
Sloan joined the British Army at the age of 18 before beginning his playing career in Ireland at the end of his service with Irish Intermediate League side Crusaders. His performances led to him being selected to represent an Intermediate League XI. The club had previously sold Jimmy Nelson to Cardiff City in 1921 where the Scotsman had impressed. Cardiff subsequently approached Crusaders to enquire "Have you any more players like Jimmy?" This correspondence ultimately led to Sloan and Tom Watson joining Cardiff. Club manager Fred Stewart had been informed of Sloan in early 1924 and had travelled to Ireland in order to watch him play, only to find him suspended for the match in question, while Scottish side Third Lanark had also expressed interest in his signing. Alongside his playing career with Crusaders, Sloan had served as a policeman until his departure from the club in 1924.

=== Cardiff City ===
Sloan completed his transfer to Cardiff in May 1924, alongside fellow Irishman Paddy McIlvenny, upon which Sloan was described in the Western Mail as "one of the finest left half backs in Ireland". On his arrival at the club, Sloan found his path to the first team blocked by the half back trio of Fred Keenor, Harry Wake and Billy Hardy. He was forced to wait until the second half of the 1924–25 season before making his senior debut for the club. With Keenor absent on international duty, Sloan started in a 1–1 draw with Notts County on 14 February 1925 in a side without six first team regulars due to international call-ups. He appeared only four further times during the remainder of the campaign, covering for Keenor on each occasion.

He remained a reserve for the opening matches of the 1925–26 season before making his first appearance of the campaign in a 6–3 defeat to Blackburn Rovers on 26 September 1925 in place of Hardy. He retained his place for the majority of the season, largely over club captain Keenor, making 31 appearances in all competitions as Cardiff finished 16th in the First Division. The following year, Sloan again began the season as backup; he made his first appearance of the campaign in a 2–0 defeat to Manchester United on 25 September. His start to the year was also disrupted by a back injury.

In late December 1926, Sloan regained his first team place and appeared in 18 of the remaining 24 games of the league season. His return to the side also led to him playing all 7 matches of the club's FA Cup run, including the final where they defeated Arsenal 1–0 to become the only team from outside England to win the competition. In their coverage of the final, the Western Mail described Sloan as "impetuous at times, but on his day a dominating personality and a good shot". Two weeks after their FA Cup victory, Sloan helped Cardiff complete a cup double by winning the Welsh Cup final, defeating Rhyl 2–0.

The cup winning season proved to be Sloan's last prominent season in the first team, having again been displaced by Keenor who had reverted to his usual position. He made 27 league appearances over the following two years which culminated in Cardiff's relegation to the Second Division at the end of the 1928–29 season. His only goal for Cardiff came in a 1–1 draw with Arsenal during his final year with the club.

=== Return to Ireland ===
Sloan, along with fellow FA Cup winner Watson, was placed on the transfer list by Cardiff in April 1929. The pair eventually left the club return to Ireland and join Linfield in June 1929. He was appointed club captain on his arrival although his early months were hampered by injury. In his first season, Sloan was selected to captain an Irish League XI against their counterparts from the Irish Free State.

He helped the side to a double by winning both the Irish League and Irish Cup. In the cup final against Ballymena, the Ballymena Observer noted that Sloan and his two half back teammates had "carried them (Linfield) to victory" as his side won 3–0 to retain the trophy. As team captain, Sloan was presented with the trophy by the president of the Irish Football Association. Along with Watson, the victory completed an unusual Treble for Sloan, having won the major cup competition in three countries after already having won the FA Cup and the Welsh Cup. He helped Linfield repeat their double success the following year and remained with the side until 1932 when he was released. Sloan had been in talks about taking up a player-coach role with the side but was unable to agree terms. During his playing career, he acquired the nickname "sticky" Sloan which remained with him throughout the remainder of his time in football.

== International career ==
Sloan was selected to represent Ireland in a junior international fixture in March 1924, helping his side to a 2–1 victory over their Scottish counterparts. He received his first call-up to the senior side in October 1925; he was selected as a replacement for team captain Sam Irving ahead of a match against England at Windsor Park when his team refused his release. The game ended in a goalless draw.

Sloan won eight further caps during his time with Cardiff before being recalled to win another three in the early 1930s. Following his retirement, the Portadown News wrote that Sloan was "one of the most consistent performers who ever wore an Irish shirt".

== Managerial career ==
=== Portadown and Linfield ===
Sloan was appointed player-manager of Portadown in December 1932, after being offered the role in a telegram by the club's chairman W. A. Mullen. His first match in a managerial role on 30 December ended in victory as his side defeated Belfast Celtic 1–0. The club was struggling both financially and in results on his arrival, but Sloan guided the side to their first senior trophy since joining the Intermediate League by defeating Glentoran in the final of the 1933–34 Gold Cup. Following their victory, The News Letter that Sloan had "worked wonders" during his first year.

In May 1935, Sloan was also appointed club secretary alongside his role as manager and also became a keen scout in the Scottish leagues, from where he signed numerous players who had fallen out of favour with their teams before becoming prominent players for the club. With his increased responsibilities in the role, overseeing parts of the club's infrastructure, the Portadown News reported that "every department of the well balanced Portadown force bears evidence of his handiwork" and was "a credit to the man who built it". Ahead of the 1935–36 season, Sloan was presented with a new bedroom suite having helped stabilise the club's finances with the sale of three players, including Ben Clarke. He also led the club to the final of the City Cup where they were defeated by Linfield.

During his last full campaign with Portadown, the 1936–37 season, Sloan led the club to fourth place in the Irish Intermediate League and attained the highest points total in the club's history. In October 1937, after five years with Portadown, Sloan decided to accept an offer to return to former club Linfield as manager. However, he returned to Portadown a year later after receiving what The News Letter described as "an attractive offer" before resigning from his role at Linfield. Sloan, however, stated that the move was not made for financial reasons, rather that he was happier in Portadown while he had also clashed with some members of Linfield's committee.

=== Wartime and third Portadown spell ===
Following the outbreak of World War II, Sloan stepped down from his position with Portadown and enlisted in the Royal Army Service Corps as a private. Within a year, he was promoted to corporal and then sergeant, while his previous footballing experience led to him refereeing amateur matches while stationed in France. In June 1941, he was involved in a car accident while on duty and sustained severe injuries. He was later discharged from the Army several months later owing to an arm injury sustained in the accident and returned to Ireland.

He rejoined Portadown in 1942 to assist in the running of the newly formed reserve side at the club alongside Norman Corner, before joining Cliftonville as a scout the following year. He had previously applied for the manager role with Glentoran earlier in the year.

Sloan returned to management in December 1947 when he was appointed manager of Portadown for the third time. However, this proves to be his shortest spell with the club as he resigned his position three months later in February 1948. He later took up a coaching position at the club in 1950. Idris Hopkins briefly managed Portadown in 1952 before returning to England having failed to settle, resulting in Sloan being appointed manager for a fourth time in his place on a part-time basis. He remained in charge until January 1953, when Willie Ross was appointed on a permanent basis with Sloan reverting to his role as trainer. By the time he retired from football, Sloan had spent 30 years at Portadown in various capacities.

== Personal life ==
Sloan married Martha Henry at Drumcree Parish Church in Portadown in July 1939. The couple had three children together, a daughter, Margaret, and two sons, Milne and Jackie. He died on 2 June 1978 in Lurgan after a short illness and was buried in Seagoe Cemetery, Portadown.

== Career statistics ==
Appearances and goals by club, season and competition
Club	Season	League			FA Cup		Welsh Cup		Total	
Club	Season	Division	Apps	Goals	Apps	Goals	Apps	Goals	Apps	Goals
Cardiff City	1925–26	First Division	4	0	0	0	1	0	5	0
Cardiff City	1925–26	First Division	28	0	3	0	0	0	31	0
Cardiff City	1926–27	First Division	20	0	7	0	4	0	31	0
Cardiff City	1927–28	First Division	12	0	1	0	3	0	16	0
Cardiff City	1928–29	First Division	15	1	0	0	0	0	15	1
Total			79	1	11	0	8	0	98	1

== Honours ==
Cardiff City

- FA Cup: 1926–27
- Welsh Cup: 1927

Linfield

- Irish League: 1929–30, 1930–31
- Irish Cup: 1930, 1931
