= Jimmy Nelson (footballer) =

Scottish footballer (1901–1965)

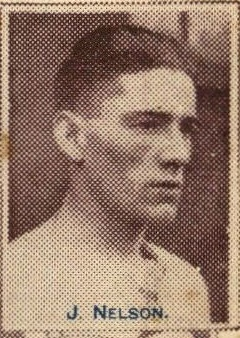
- Nelson pictured on a postcard in 1923

Personal information
- Full name: James Nelson
- Date of birth: 7 January 1901
- Place of birth: Greenock, Scotland
- Date of death: 8 October 1965 (aged 64)
- Height: 5 ft 8 in (1.73 m)
- Position: Full back

Youth career
- St Paul's
- Glenarm

Senior career*
Years	Team	Apps	(Gls)
1919–1921	Crusaders		
1921–1930	Cardiff City	240	(2)
1930–1935	Newcastle United	146	(0)
1935–1939	Southend United	73	(0)
Total		459	(2)

International career
1925–1930	Scotland	4	(0)
- * Club domestic league appearances and goals

James Nelson (7 January 1901 – 8 October 1965) was a Scottish professional footballer who played as a full-back. He moved to Ireland as a child where he began his senior career with Irish Intermediate League side Crusaders. He spent two seasons with the team before joining Football League First Division side Cardiff City in 1921. After two seasons as a reserve, he became established in the first team and went on to make more than 250 appearances in all competitions. He helped the club reach two FA Cup finals, losing the first in 1925 before Cardiff became the first team from outside England to win the competition in 1927. He also won the 1927 FA Charity Shield and the Welsh Cup on four occasions with Cardiff.

Following Cardiff's relegation, Nelson was sold to Newcastle United in 1930. He went on to captain the side to victory in the 1932 FA Cup Final during his second year. He remained with Newcastle for five years, making more than 150 appearances in all competitions before finishing his professional career with Third Division South side Southend United. At international level, Nelson attained four caps for the Scotland national team between 1926 and 1930, including being part of the Wembley Wizards Scotland side of 1928.

== Club career ==
=== Early years ===
Nelson was born in Greenock, Scotland, the sixth son of Alexander Nelson and his wife Jeanie. The family moved to Northern Ireland when Nelson was seven where his father was employed as a ship builder. He started his football career there with junior sides St Paul's and Glenarm, initially playing as a forward. At senior level, he joined Irish Intermediate League side Crusaders in 1919 where he was described as a "fullback with great promise". His spell with the team was disrupted by a broken leg during his second season, however he was still chosen to represent an Irish League XI on several occasions and captained the side against their English counterparts. He was spotted by Fred Stewart, manager of Welsh side Cardiff City, who paid £500 to complete a transfer to Cardiff. Such was Nelson's success at Cardiff that the Welsh side sent a message to Crusaders asking "Have you any more players like Jimmy?". This correspondence ultimately led to Tom Sloan and Tom Watson also moving to Cardiff in the following years.

=== Cardiff City ===
Nelson moved to Wales in 1921 when signed by Cardiff City, coinciding with the team being promoted to the First Division of the Football League. He made his debut for the club two months into the 1921–22 season, replacing captain Charlie Brittain in a 2–0 victory over West Bromwich Albion on 29 October. He retained his place for Cardiff's following match, a 2–0 defeat to Manchester City on 5 November, but these proved to be the only senior appearances in his first season. The following year, Nelson again started the campaign as a reserve, with Brittain and Jack Page being preferred in Nelson's favoured position. He made only one appearance during the first half of the season, but was recalled for a goalless draw with Bolton Wanderers on 30 December 1922. Nelson retained his place for the rest of the season, missing only 4 of the remaining 19 matches and finishing the campaign with 24 appearances in all competitions. This included helping the side to victory in the Welsh Cup by defeating Aberdare Athletic 3–2 in the final.

With Brittain departing the club in 1924, Nelson retained his place in the first team the following season. He was ever present in the First Division, playing in all 42 matches, as the club finished second to Huddersfield Town on goal average. He also played in 11 cup ties during the campaign, making more appearances for the club than any other player. In the 1925–26 season he remained prominent in the first team and scored his first goals for the club, converting penalties during victories over Burnley and Nottingham Forest in the second half of the campaign. The season culminated with Nelson and Cardiff both reaching their first FA Cup final, losing 1–0 to Sheffield United at Wembley Stadium.

In the opening game of the 1925–26 season, a 3–2 defeat to Manchester City, Nelson became the first Cardiff player to be sent off in a Football League match. With the match tied at 2–2, Nelson became involved in an altercation with an opposition player in his penalty area. He was subsequently dismissed after the referee witnessed him kick opposition forward Tommy Johnson, with Manchester City converting the resulting penalty to win the game. Nelson was later banned for a month following the clash and missed five league matches.

Nelson missed the opening four matches of the 1926–27 season before returning to the side and remaining ever present for the remainder of the campaign, appearing in 50 consecutive games as Cardiff finished 14th in the First Division. At the end of the season, he helped the side reach the 1927 FA Cup Final against Arsenal, shortly before which the Daily Herald described him as "one of the best backs in the country". Cardiff secured a 1–0 victory, becoming the only team from outside England to win the competition. His success gained him the unusual moniker of the "Scotsman from Ireland who won the English Cup with a Welsh team". He also claimed his second Welsh Cup title as Cardiff defeated Rhyl 2–0 in the final.

Cardiff achieved a sixth-placed finish in the 1927–28 season with Nelson making more than 45 appearances in all competitions. However, this proved to be Nelson's last prominent season with the club. After featuring in the opening nine games the following campaign, he succumbed to injury and appeared only two more times as Cardiff suffered relegation to the Second Division after finishing last. Nelson did not return to the first team on a regular basis until midway through the 1929–30 season. He won a fourth Welsh Cup title during his final season, scoring his last goal for the club in a 4–0 victory over Swansea City, their local rivals, in the sixth round.

=== Newcastle United ===
Nelson left Cardiff in July 1930, signing for Newcastle United for £7,000. He made his debut for the club on the opening day of the 1930–31 season in a 2–1 defeat against Sheffield Wednesday. After one further appearance, Nelson was absent from the first team for three months before returning in November. He finished his debut season having made 25 appearances in all competitions.

His second season with Newcastle proved to be his most prominent as he made 49 appearances in all competitions. This included playing in all eight cup matches en route to reaching the 1932 FA Cup Final. He captained the side to victory in the game, defeating Arsenal to win the competition for the second time in his career. Nelson was still held in high esteem in South Wales from his spell with Cardiff and a benefit night was hosted in his honour in Ystrad Mynach shortly after the cup final. As well as raising money for the Caerphilly District Miners Hospital, Nelson was presented with a painting of himself and other items. He remained a regular for two further seasons, making 40 league appearances in both.

Newcastle were relegated to the Second Division in 1934 and Nelson fell out of favour during the 1934–35 season. He appeared in the opening three games of the campaign, all of which Newcastle lost as they conceded 14 goals in the process. The third match, a 5–2 defeat against Brentford on 1 September, proved to be his final appearance for the side. Nelson was among ten players that were released by Newcastle at the end of the year. A potential return to Cardiff was considered, with the side having fallen into the Third Division South, while Watford also showed interest in his signing.

=== Southend United ===
Nelson joined Third Division South side Southend United in June 1935. Within the first six months, he helped the side win the Southend Hospital Cup, a regional competition. Nelson attended the award ceremony with his teammates in January 1936, during which his car was stolen from outside the venue before being abandoned in Pitsea. He remained with the club until 1939, making 81 appearances in all competitions. The same year, he unsuccessfully applied for the managerial position at Chelsea, losing out to Billy Birrell.

== International career ==
Nelson made his international debut for Scotland on 14 February 1925 in a 3–1 victory over Wales, a match in which he was the only Scottish player from outside his nation's league system to be selected. He retained his place for his side's 3–0 win over Ireland two weeks later. His next cap came more than three years later when he was recalled for a match against England in March 1928. In the match, Scotland caused a major upset by winning 5–1, with the side becoming known as the Wembley Wizards. His final cap came in May 1930 when he played in a 2–0 victory over France. Nelson had previously been selected to play for Ireland but was withdrawn from the squad when he was found to be ineligible having been born in Scotland.

== Personal life ==
Nelson married Doris Noon in July 1936 at St. Mary's Roman Catholic Church in Canton, Cardiff. One of his brothers, Davey Nelson, was also a footballer, following his brother by playing for both Crusaders and Cardiff City.

After retiring from playing, Nelson served as a policeman during wartime. He became a publican after the war ended, initially in Southend where he worked for his former club in different capacities. He later took over pubs in Penarth and Cardiff. His son Tony became an amateur international footballer for Wales then later turned professional with Newport County and AFC Bournemouth.

== Career statistics ==
Appearances and goals by club, season and competition
Club	Season	League			FA Cup		Other (Note: Includes other competitive competitions, including the FA Charity Shield, Welsh Cup and Football League Third Division South Cup.)		Total	
Club	Season	Division	Apps	Goals	Apps	Goals	Apps	Goals	Apps	Goals
Cardiff City	1921–22	First Division	2	0	0	0	0	0	2	0
Cardiff City	1922–23	First Division	17	0	3	0	4	0	24	0
Cardiff City	1923–24	First Division	42	0	6	0	5	0	53	0
Cardiff City	1924–25	First Division	37	2	8	0	1	0	46	2
Cardiff City	1925–26	First Division	34	0	3	0	1	0	38	0
Cardiff City	1926–27	First Division	38	0	7	0	5	0	50	0
Cardiff City	1927–28	First Division	41	0	3	1	5	0	49	1
Cardiff City	1928–29	First Division	11	0	0	0	0	0	11	0
Cardiff City	1929–30	Second Division	18	0	0	0	4	1	26	1
Cardiff City	Total		240	2	30	1	25	1	295	4
Newcastle United	1930–31	First Division	23	0	2	0	0	0	25	0
Newcastle United	1931–32	First Division	40	0	9	0	0	0	49	0
Newcastle United	1932–33	First Division	40	0	1	0	1	0	42	0
Newcastle United	1933–34	First Division	40	0	1	0	0	0	41	0
Newcastle United	1934–35	Second Division	3	0	0	0	0	0	3	0
Newcastle United	Total		146	0	13	0	1	0	160	0
Southend United	1935–36	Third Division South	37	0	4	0	1	0	42	0
Southend United	1936–37	Third Division South	24	0	2	0	0	0	26	0
Southend United	1937–38	Third Division South	9	0	0	0	1	0	10	0
Southend United	1938–39	Third Division South	3	0	0	0	0	0	3	0
Southend United	Total		73	0	6	0	2	0	81	0
Career total			459	2	49	1	28	1	536	4

== Honours ==
Cardiff City

- FA Cup: 1926–27; runner-up: 1924–25
- FA Charity Shield: 1927
- Welsh Cup: 1923, 1927, 1928, 1930

Newcastle United

- FA Cup: 1931–32
