= Harry McCracken (footballer) =

Northern Irish footballer

Personal information
- Full name: Henry McCracken
- Place of birth: Castlewellan, Northern Ireland
- Position: Centre forward

Senior career*
Years	Team	Apps	(Gls)
- Annsborough
- Newry Town
–1925	Cardiff City	0	(0)
1926	Charlton Athletic	1	(0)
1926	Linfield		
- Portadown

International career
1925	Ireland Amateurs	1	(3)
1928–1931	Irish League XI	5	(0)
- * Club domestic league appearances and goals

Henry McCracken was a Northern Irish amateur footballer, best remembered for his time as a centre forward in the Irish League with Linfield. He scored a hat-trick on his only appearance for the Ireland amateur team in November 1925.

== Personal life ==
McCracken was one of four brothers who played Irish League football.

== Honours ==
Linfield

- Irish League: 1929–30, 1930–31, 1933–34
- Irish Cup: 1929–30, 1930–31, 1933–34
