= Sam Smith (footballer, born 1904) =

English footballer

Personal information
- Full name: Samuel James William Smith
- Date of birth: 14 November 1904
- Place of birth: Stafford, England
- Date of death: June 1988 (age 83)
- Place of death: Falmouth, Cornwall, England
- Height: 5 ft 10 1/2 in (1.79 m)
- Position: Inside forward

Youth career
- Darby End Victoria

Senior career*
Years	Team	Apps	(Gls)
1923–1924	Cradley Heath		
1924–1927	Cardiff City	4	(0)
1927–1928	Port Vale	4	(0)
1928–1929	Hull City	14	(2)
1929–1930	Millwall	1	(0)
1930	Kidderminster Harriers		
- * Club domestic league appearances and goals

Samuel James William Smith (14 November 1904 – June 1988) was an English footballer who played at inside-forward for Cradley Heath, Cardiff City, Port Vale, Hull City, and Millwall.

== Career ==
Smith was an England schoolboy international during World War I. He played for Darby End Victoria and Birmingham & District League side Cradley Heath, before joining Cardiff City in February 1924. He played two First Division games in both the 1925–26 and 1926–27 seasons. He then left Ninian Park and dropped down to the Second Division to sign with Port Vale in May 1927. He played just four games at the Old Recreation Ground in the later half of the 1927–28 season, before being given a free transfer in May 1928. He moved on to Hull City in June 1928, starting the first eight Second Division games of the 1928–29 season, scoring the winning goal in his second appearance against Oldham Athletic. He was dropped to the reserves by manager Bill McCracken in late-September as Ronnie Starling was restored to the first XI. He returned for two Christmas fixtures against Preston North End and scored on Christmas Day in a 5-1 victory. He again rarely featured until the last three games of the season, which he started in preference to Sam Weaver. Smith spent the 1929–30 season at Millwall, playing just the one Second Division game. He later played for non-League side Kidderminster Harriers. By 1939 he was working as a railwayman in Rugeley.

== Career statistics ==
Appearances and goals by club, season and competition
Club	Season	League			FA Cup		Welsh Cup		Total	
Club	Season	Division	Apps	Goals	Apps	Goals	Apps	Goals	Apps	Goals
Cardiff City	1924–25	First Division	0	0	0	0	0	0	0	0
Cardiff City	1925–26	First Division	2	0	1	0	0	0	3	0
Cardiff City	1926–27	First Division	2	0	0	0	0	0	2	0
Cardiff City	Total		4	0	1	0	0	0	5	0
Port Vale	1927–28	Second Division	4	0	0	0	—		4	0
Hull City	1928–29	Second Division	14	2	0	0	—		14	2
Millwall	1929–30	Second Division	1	0	0	0	—		1	0
