= Tony Nelson (footballer) =

Welsh footballer (1930–2022)

Personal information
- Full name: Anthony James Nelson
- Date of birth: 12 April 1930
- Place of birth: Cardiff, Wales
- Date of death: 27 August 2022 (aged 92)
- Position: Centre half

Senior career*
Years	Team	Apps	(Gls)
1951–1954	Newport County	19	(6)
1954–1956	Bristol City	0	(0)
1956–1965	Bournemouth	194	(1)
Total		213	(6)

International career
1951-52	Wales Amateurs	2	(2)
- * Club domestic league appearances and goals

Anthony James Nelson (12 April 1930 – 27 August 2022) was a Welsh professional footballer who played in the Football League for Newport County and Bournemouth as a centre half.

His father was footballer Jimmy Nelson who was born in Scotland (playing for the national team four times) and brought up in Northern Ireland, but settled in Wales.

== International career ==
Nelson won both of his Wales Amateur caps in 1952 as an amateur with Newport County. He made his debut on 16 February at Bangor City's Farrar Road against England Amateurs in a 3-4 defeat, scoring after only 5 minutes. Nelson retained his place for the following match away to Scotland Amateurs on 1 March at Grant Street, Inverness home of Clachnacuddin and he scored again in a 2-3 defeat for the Welsh.
