= Jack Ferguson (water polo, born 1930) =

British water polo player (1930–2025)

Personal information
- Full name: John Andrew Ferguson
- Nationality: British (Scottish)
- Born: 4 April 1930 Motherwell, Scotland
- Died: 1 January 2025 (aged 94) Broughty Ferry, Dundee, Scotland

Sport
- Sport: Water polo

John Andrew Ferguson (4 April 1930 - 1 January 2025) was a British water polo player. He spent his career playing for his hometown side Motherwell and competed at the 1952 Summer Olympics and the 1956 Summer Olympics. After retiring from playing, he coached the British national side for four years. Ferguson died on 1 January 2025, at the age of 94.

Alongside water polo, Ferguson trained as a physical education teacher and worked for several schools in Scotland. He later became deputy director of physical education at the University of St Andrews.

== Early life ==
Ferguson was born in Motherwell to professional footballer Hughie Ferguson and his wife Jessie. His father committed suicide at Dens Park, the home ground of Dundee, in January 1930, three months before Ferguson's birth in April of the same year. Ferguson was the couple's third child; he had an older brother, Tom, and sister, Sadie. His sister later married James Hogg, also a footballer and the brother of Scottish international Bobby Hogg.

At the age of 5, Ferguson visited the Motherwell Baths where he developed a love of swimming. The Baths were run by David Crabb and Ferguson became part of the 'Tiny Tots', a groups of 4 to 8 years olds that performed swimming and diving routines in Crabb's Motherwell Water Circus around Britain.

Ferguson attended Dalziel Public School and Dalziel High School. He left the school hoping to pursue a career as a physical education teacher and attended the Scottish School of Physical Education in Jordanhill. There he gained a diploma in physical education. During his studies, he also competed for the school's gymnastics team and was part of the school's squad chosen to represent Britain at the Lingiad in Sweden in 1949.

== Military and teaching career ==
Having graduated from the School of Physical Education, Ferguson worked in several schools before being appointed as a staff assistant at Hamilton Academy. However, his spell there was interrupted after he was called up for National Service. He joined the Royal Air Force (RAF) as a physical fitness officer. He later became the deputy director of physical education at the University of St Andrews where he worked until his retirement in 1990. In 2007, Ferguson was one of the inaugural inductees into the university's sports hall of fame.

== Water polo ==
Ferguson was a keen swimmer from an early age after visiting the Motherwell Baths with his brother at the age of five. He took up water polo in the late 1940s and played as a forward. He captained the RAF team and trained the side to victory in an inter-services tournament against the other branches of the armed forces. He also scored the winning goal in the final of the 1949 Amateur Swimming Association water polo final, the only time the competition has been won by a team from outside England. He spent his career playing for Motherwell AC, with whom he won the Scottish Water Polo Cup 12 times in 13 attempts between 1947 and 1960.

Ferguson represented Britain at the 1952 Summer Olympics and the 1954 European Games. He was selected for the Olympics a second time for the 1956 summer games. The side opened with consecutive defeats against the United States and Hungary but won their remaining three matches to finish the competition in seventh place. At the time of his death in January 2025, he was the last Scotsman to represent Britain at the Olympics in water polo. After retiring from playing, Ferguson spent four years as the coach of the British national side.
