= Hughie Ferguson =

Scottish footballer (1895–1930)

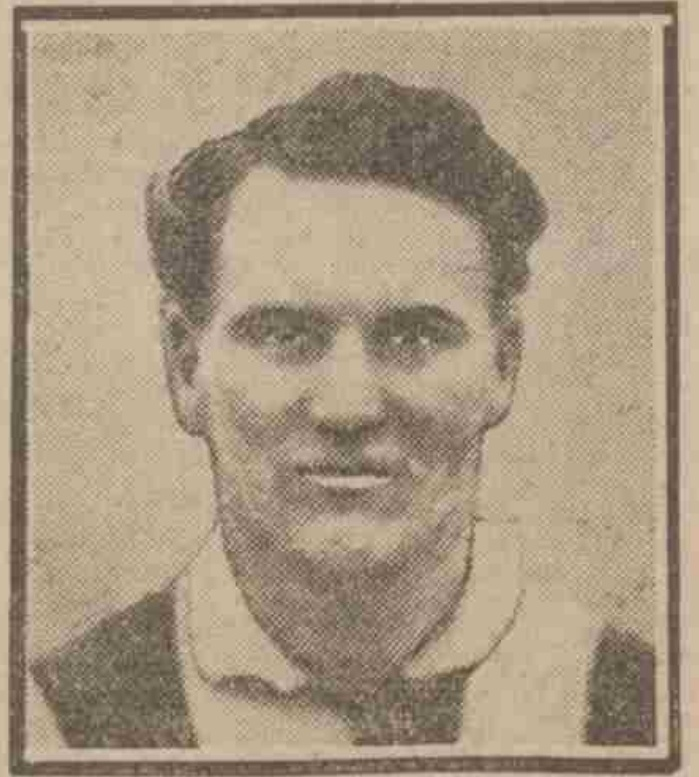
- Ferguson in 1917

Personal information
- Full name: Hugh Ferguson
- Date of birth: 2 March 1895
- Place of birth: Motherwell, Scotland
- Date of death: 8 January 1930 (aged 34)
- Place of death: Dundee, Scotland
- Height: 5 ft 7 in (1.70 m)
- Position: Centre forward

Youth career
- Motherwell Boys' Brigade
- Motherwell Hearts

Senior career*
Years	Team	Apps	(Gls)
1914–1916	Parkhead		
1916–1925	Motherwell	301	(284)
1925–1929	Cardiff City	117	(77)
1929–1930	Dundee	17	(2)
Total		435	(363)

International career
1917	SFL XI (wartime)	1	(0)
1920–1922	Scottish League XI	3	(3)
- * Club domestic league appearances and goals

Hugh Ferguson (2 March 1895 – 8 January 1930) was a Scottish professional footballer. Born in Motherwell, he played for Parkhead at junior level as an amateur and was one of the most sought-after young players in Scotland before signing for his hometown club, Motherwell F.C., to begin his professional career. He established himself as a consistent scorer playing as a centre forward, finishing as the top goalscorer in the Scottish Football League on three occasions between 1918 and 1921. His 284 league goals remains a record at the club and, by 1925, he was the highest-scoring player in the history of the Scottish League.

In 1925, Ferguson moved to Welsh side Cardiff City for £5,000 (equivalent to £260,000 in 2025) and continued his scoring exploits. He was the club's top goalscorer for four consecutive seasons and scored the winning goal in the 1927 FA Cup Final during a 1–0 victory over Arsenal. He also scored in the 1927 FA Charity Shield, during a 2–1 victory over amateur side Corinthians. Both results made Cardiff the only non-English team to have won the FA Cup or the FA Charity Shield. Despite his prolific scoring record, finishing his career with a goal average of 0.855 per game, he was never selected to play for Scotland, but did represent a Scottish League XI on three occasions.

Ferguson returned to Scotland with Dundee in 1929, but struggled to reproduce his goalscoring form. Six months after his arrival, he had lost his place on the team. He committed suicide on 8 January 1930 at the age of 34. He is one out of only seven men in the history of the English and Scottish Football Leagues to have scored 350 league goals.

== Career ==
=== Early career ===
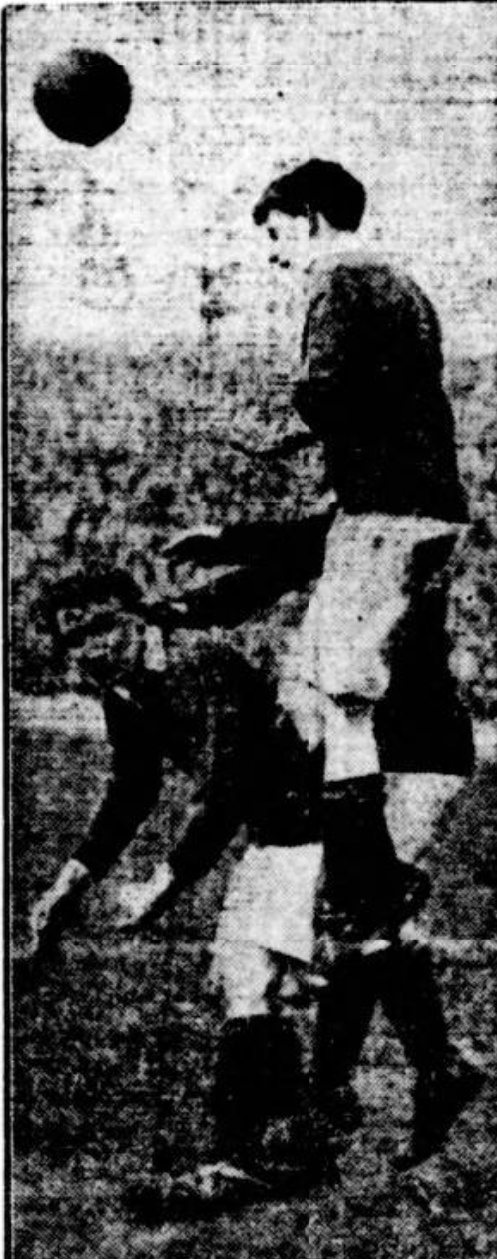
Ferguson (jumping, right) heads a ball while playing for Parkhead Juniors in the 1916 Scottish Junior Cup final.

Ferguson started his career with local youth sides in his hometown of Motherwell and represented the Dalziel School's team as a half back. He moved on to the Motherwell branch of the Boys' Brigade and later Motherwell Hearts as an outside forward, helping the club reach the Scottish Juvenile Cup final. He joined Glasgow-based Parkhead in 1914, when he switched to playing as a centre forward. He appeared for the side in their victorious 1914–15 Scottish Junior Cup final over Port Glasgow Athletic Juniors. Ferguson opened the scoring after 20 minutes by hitting a first-time shot past the opposition goalkeeper, which The Sunday Post described as "a capital goal". Parkhead went on to win the match 2–0. At the end of his first season with Parkhead, he was chosen in a Glasgow Junior League XI against a Rest of Scotland XI and scored three of his side's goals in a 5–1 victory. The Midlothian Journal remarked that Ferguson was "in a class by himself". He entered into contract talks with Manchester City and was on the verge of signing for the club when the First World War escalated. With the suspension of football in England, the move was cancelled.

Ahead of the 1915–16 season, with Scottish football continuing during the First World War, Ferguson held talks with his hometown side Motherwell and missed the start of Parkhead's opening game of the campaign after extensive discussions with Motherwell manager John Hunter ran late. He remained with Parkhead and by the mid-point of the campaign, Ferguson was one of the most coveted young players in the country, having scored more than 30 goals in the first four months of the season, and gaining the notice of several clubs. He turned down a second offer to join Motherwell the same month and was due to turn out for Rangers in a benefit match a month later, but withdrew after sustaining an injury while playing for Parkhead in the Scottish Junior Cup, a tie in which he scored five times. He was chosen to represent the Glasgow Junior League XI against a team from the Rest of Scotland for the second time in February 1916, and scored one of his side's goals in a 5–2 victory. The match served as a trial for the selection of a Scottish Junior side to take on their Irish counterparts in March, and Ferguson was duly selected. Against the Irish side, he was marked closely and missed several chances as his frustration over his treatment grew. He did win a penalty in the second half that he converted to seal a 2–0 win for Scotland.

Syd Puddefoot recalled Ferguson playing against Shettleston in a Scottish Junior Cup match that had been delayed and risked the forward missing an appointment; Ferguson proceeded to score eight times for Parkhead before feigning injury to leave the game early with the result no longer in doubt. Parkhead went on to win the game 11–1. Ferguson also helped Parkhead reach a second consecutive Scottish Junior Cup final in 1916, but his side were defeated 2–0 by Petershill.

After the 1916 final, many of Parkhead's squad were signed by professional clubs. Ferguson, who had scored more than 70 goals in his last year with the side, retained his amateur status longer than his teammates as he hoped for an offer from a Lancashire-based side in the Football League. The Sporting Chronicle described Ferguson as "the most debated junior player of his time", some regarding him as a "mere goalscorer", but added that "there is not a senior club in Scotland who would not give £10, many times multiplied, to get Ferguson". Ferguson returned to Parkhead for the start of the 1916–17 season and scored twice for the club in a 3–1 victory over Strathclyde.

=== Motherwell ===
==== Debut season and first top scorer award ====
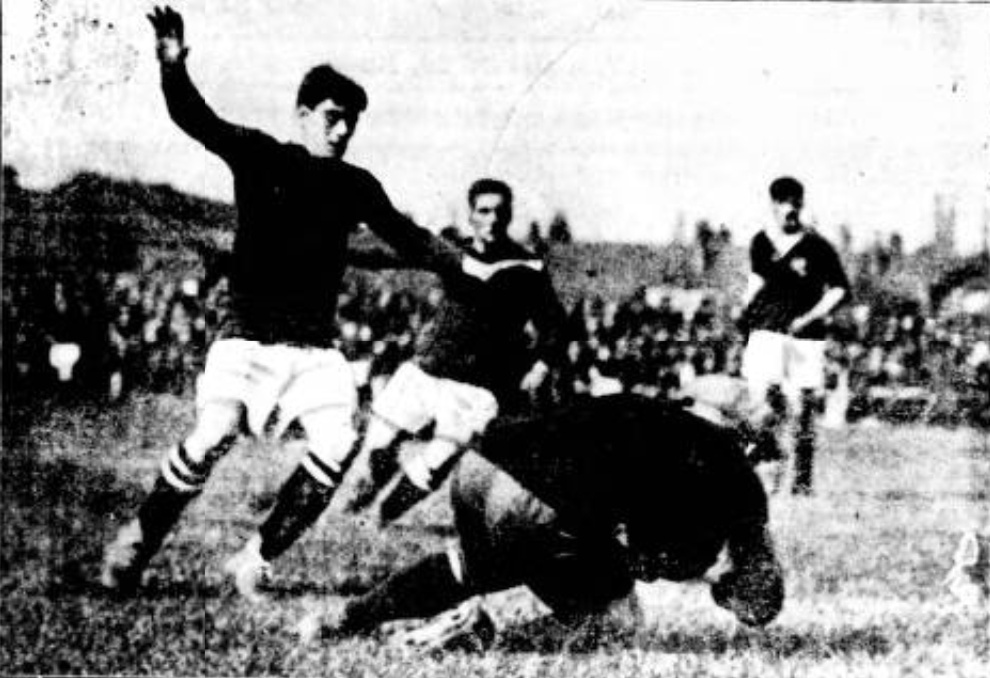
Ferguson (left) advances on goal during his senior debut for Motherwell in August 1916.

Ferguson came close to signing for Celtic, but eventually joined his hometown side Motherwell for the start of the 1916–17 Scottish Football League season. Following the collapse of his move to Manchester, he had stated that Motherwell was "the only other club he would think about". He made his professional debut for the club in a 2–2 draw with Raith Rovers on 19 August 1916, scoring both of his side's goals. Two weeks later, he scored his first senior hat-trick during a 4–2 win over Dundee and had a later strike disallowed for an earlier foul. Motherwell had trailed 1–0 at half-time before Ferguson inspired a second-half comeback. The first half of his season was limited owing to minor injuries, but he went on to finish his first campaign with 25 league goals, including a second hat-trick against Dumbarton in February 1917. His tally was the fourth highest in the league and accounted for nearly half his side's goals during the campaign. At the end of the season, he was selected in a Scottish League representative side for a benefit match against league champions Celtic; the Sheffield Star Green 'Un remarked that "few footballers have made their reputation as quickly".

In the opening game of the 1917–18 season, Ferguson opened his account for the new campaign by netting all four of Motherwell's goals during a 4–2 victory over Third Lanark. During a league match against St Mirren in October, he was knocked unconscious after being fouled in the opposition penalty area. The referee awarded a penalty for the foul, from which the winning goal was scored. Ferguson was stretchered off the pitch and did not play for another three weeks. Further hat-tricks followed during the season; the first, against Ayr United in December, placed Ferguson as the highest-scoring player in Scotland at the end of 1917 with 22 goals. The second came a month later, against Queen's Park in January 1918. He finished the season as the Scottish League's top goalscorer with 34, three ahead of Third Lanark's David McLean. His goals helped Motherwell record a fifth-placed finish and become the highest-scoring team in the league, Ferguson again scoring around half of his side's goals.

==== Further top five finishes ====
Motherwell began the 1918–19 season in poor form, scoring only twice in their opening five matches, one of which was claimed by Ferguson. His season was affected by illness after he contracted a throat infection which forced him to miss most of the final two months of 1918. Motherwell recovered to repeat their fifth place finish the following year, but scored considerably fewer goals, Ferguson himself recording his lowest tally for the club in a full season after scoring 19 times in the league from 26 appearances, though he remained the team's top scorer.

Ferguson scored his first goals of the 1919–20 season by netting a hat-trick in an opening-game victory over Dundee. He scored a second hat-trick against Hamilton Academical three weeks later, for which he received a gold watch from local businessman T. B. Hill. Ferguson followed this up with a brace against Raith Rovers in Motherwell's next game, placing him as the Scottish League's top goalscorer, having netted eleven times in his first six appearances, three ahead of his nearest rival. Ferguson also scored in all of his league appearances until 6 October, when his side were beaten by Dundee. His early season form led to his selection in a Scottish League XI to face an Irish League XI, but he withdrew from the match after sustaining an injury in a league match against Heart of Midlothian the week before. The injury kept Ferguson out for five weeks before making his return against Partick Thistle in mid-December.

Despite his absence, by the end of January 1920, Ferguson remained tied with James Williamson of Hibernian as the league's top goalscorer with 21. Ferguson moved ahead of his rival after scoring a hat-trick during a 5–1 win over Clyde in early February. He was selected for the Scottish League XI for a second time and played in a 4–0 defeat to their English league counterparts on 20 March. His performance was criticised in The Sunday Post after he missed several chances to score. Ferguson finished the season as the Scottish League's top goalscorer with 33. His goals helped Motherwell claim third position in the league, their highest finish in the top tier at the time.

==== Record-breaking season ====
Ferguson continued his good form into the 1920–21 season and netted four of his side's goals during a 6–0 win over Queen's Park early in the campaign. He followed this up with a further hat-trick against Falkirk two weeks later and ended October as the joint-highest scorer in the league. His goalscoring form attracted attention from clubs in England's Football League and both Everton and Huddersfield Town made enquiries to Motherwell over a transfer but were turned down. He scored a further four goals during an 8–2 victory over bottom-placed side Dumbarton in November, reaching 21 goals for the season and becoming the highest-scoring player in Scotland and England at the time.

One month later, Ferguson scored four goals in a single game for the third time during the season, this time in a 6–1 win over Ayr United. On 16 April, he repeated his four-goal achievement for the fourth time during the season in a victory over Aberdeen. In doing so, he surpassed the Scottish League record for goals in a single season of 39 set by Rangers' Willie Reid before the First World War. Ferguson's four goals took his tally to 40 for the season. He ended the campaign with 42 goals to finish as the league's top goalscorer for the third time in four seasons. His goals record would last until the following year, when Duncan Walker scored 45 goals for St Mirren.

During the opening months of the 1921–22 season, Ferguson scored his first hat-trick of the campaign against Dumbarton, by which time he was one goal short of Walker. Two weeks later, he received his second cap for the Scottish League XI in October and scored for the side as they defeated their Irish counterparts 3–0. In December, he scored all of Motherwell's goals in a 5–2 victory over Clydebank, four of which came in the first half. Ferguson was frequently linked with moves to English clubs, but the Sunday Post reported in January 1922 that he had no desire to move out of Scotland and did not enjoy the English style of football. Ferguson fell ten short of Walker in the latter's record breaking season, finishing as the second-highest scorer in the league with 35.

==== Near transfer and later years ====
At the end of the 1921–22 season Ferguson was placed on the transfer list by Motherwell at his own behest; this prompted approaches from several clubs. In June 1922, Manchester City submitted an offer of £3,500 (equivalent to £170,000 in 2025) which was rejected by Motherwell, who valued Ferguson at around £4,000 (£200,000). City returned with a bid of £3,900 (£190,000) which was accepted by the Motherwell board but the transfer collapsed when Ferguson turned down the move. He also held talks with Football League Third Division South side Bournemouth & Boscombe Athletic over a role as player-manager, which was reported by some newspapers as being completed. Ultimately no move came to fruition; Ferguson considered it unfair that he should receive no part of a potential transfer fee and he sat out the early weeks of the 1922–23 season. He eventually re-signed for Motherwell and made his return to the team in a 2–1 defeat against Aberdeen on 2 September, scoring his side's goal.

Having scored six times by mid-October, Ferguson was called up to the Scottish League XI for a match against Ireland when George French withdrew due to injury. He scored a brace for the side as they won the match 3–0. Hat-tricks for Motherwell against Kilmarnock and Clyde in November doubled his tally for the season to 12 by the end of the month. Ferguson continued his streak of hat-tricks, adding further instances in December, January and February to take his tally of hat-tricks to five for the season. He also netted hat-tricks in victories over Falkirk and Bo'ness in the Scottish Cup. The latter victory in the fourth round resulted in Motherwell reaching the semi-final of the competition for the first time in the club's history. Ferguson finished the season as the second-highest scorer in Scotland with 29 league goals, despite missing 9 games throughout the campaign, falling one short of Hearts' Jock White.

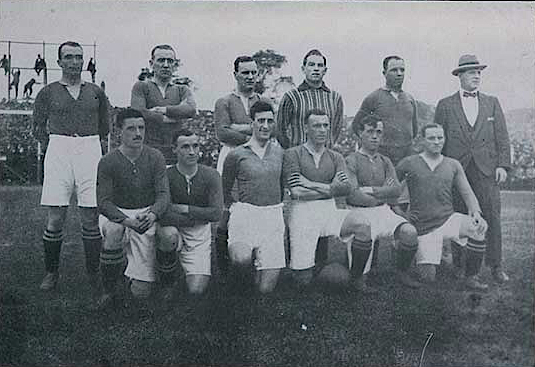
Third Lanark's team during their 1923 tour – Ferguson standing, third from left

In the summer of 1923, Third Lanark arranged a tour of South America, but found themselves short of players. The team subsequently invited players from other Scottish teams to travel, with Ferguson agreeing to take part. He scored eight goals in as many matches against opponents including Independiente, Peñarol and a Uruguay XI. Ahead of the tour, the Athletic News wrote that Ferguson had been "the most effective centre-forward in Great Britain" during the early 1920s. During the following season, he was again among the top scorers early in the year and, by the end of October, had scored 12 goals leaving him trailing only Tom Jennings of Raith Rovers. Two weeks later, Ferguson was sent off in a 2–1 victory over Queen's Park after an altercation with an opposing defender when he retaliated against some rough play. He later received a reprimand from the Scottish Football Association but avoided any further punishment. Ferguson finished third in the scorers' ranking, behind Dundee forward Dave Halliday and Jennings, registering 27 goals in 33 league appearances.

Despite his prolific scoring record, at the beginning of the 1924–25 season, Motherwell experimented by moving Ferguson to inside right rather than his usual central position. Although he frequented both positions, Ferguson maintained his scoring consistency and was one goal off being the league's highest goalscorer by late October. In January 1925, Ferguson was approached to play in the United States, but refused the offer. Later the same month, he scored five times in a 6–3 win against Galston in the first round of the Scottish Cup. Motherwell finished the season in 18th place, their lowest ranking since before the First World War. Ferguson however was the joint fourth-highest scorer in the league, but remained on the transfer list as the club looked to raise funds.

Despite his listing, Ferguson remained with Motherwell for the start of the 1925–26 season and began the campaign by scoring a brace in a victory over Clydebank on the opening day. In his final season with the club, Ferguson scored 12 times in 12 appearances, leaving him one goal behind David McCrae as the second-highest scoring player in the Scottish league at the time. His last goals for the club came in a 2–0 win over Hamilton in which he scored both of his side's goals.

=== Cardiff City ===
In November 1925, officials from Welsh side Cardiff City submitted an offer for Ferguson. Their bid was rejected but they returned to meet Motherwell's asking price soon afterwards; Ferguson signed for a fee of £5,000 (equivalent to £260,000 in 2025), just £1,000 less than the record transfer fee at the time. Such was his popularity at the Scottish club that the local steelworks closed for half an hour as the workers lined the streets to wave Ferguson off. A large crowd also gathered at the train station as he departed and a salute of 21 fog signals was issued from the David Colville & Sons works as he passed. Cardiff manager Fred Stewart, who was accompanying him, remarked that "he had never seen a player given such a send-off before". Ferguson was one of three Scots signed by Cardiff in short succession, Joe Cassidy and George McLachlan both arriving for a similar £5,000 fee combined. Ferguson made a goalscoring debut for the club in the Football League First Division (Note: Despite being based in Wales, Cardiff City compete in the English football league system.) on 7 November 1925 in a 5–2 win over Leicester City, a match in which Cassidy scored a hat-trick.

After scoring once in his first three appearances, Ferguson embarked on a goalscoring run. He netted seven times in his next five games, including the winning goals in matches against Bolton Wanderers, Notts County and West Bromwich Albion. In his first season, Ferguson finished as the club's top goalscorer with 19 league goals, despite having played in only half of Cardiff's matches. His tally also included his first hat-trick in the Football League during a 4–2 victory over Notts County in April 1926. Cardiff ended the campaign in 16th place, avoiding relegation. The improvement in the team's attacking prowess following their new signings was credited for the improved form during the latter half of the season, Ferguson's goals being a cited as a major factor.

He was again the club's top goalscorer in the 1926–27 season, netting 26 times in 39 league games, despite often playing at inside right as the club looked to fit both Ferguson and Len Davies into the starting lineup. During the campaign, Ferguson was instrumental in Cardiff's progression to the FA Cup final. He scored twice in their first four fixtures before netting the winning goal in a fourth round replay against Chelsea by converting a penalty kick. Ahead of their fourth-round tie with reigning Cup holders Bolton Wanderers, Ferguson adopted a "lucky" black cat named Trixie that he had noticed wandering at the Royal Birkdale Golf Club in Southport, where the Cardiff team were staying. The cat had been following the players and it was remarked that it "showed distinct partiality for Hughie". Ferguson tracked down the animal's owners and persuaded them to give the cat away in exchange for tickets to the final if Cardiff advanced. In the semi-final, he scored a brace against Reading as Cardiff won 3–0 to reach the 1927 FA Cup Final.

Having featured at inside right in all rounds leading up to the final, Ferguson was switched to centre-forward for the deciding match. In the 74th minute of the game, collecting a throw from the right, Ferguson hurried a tame shot toward the Arsenal goal. Dan Lewis, the Arsenal goalkeeper, appeared to collect the ball but, under pressure from the advancing Len Davies, allowed the ball to roll through his grasp; in a desperate attempt to retrieve the ball, Lewis only succeeded in knocking the ball with his elbow into his own net. Ernie Curtis, the 19‑year‑old teammate of Ferguson, said of the goal:

"I was in line with the edge of the penalty area on the right when Hughie Ferguson hit the shot which Arsenal's goalie had crouched down for a little early. The ball spun as it travelled towards him, having taken a slight deflection so he was now slightly out of line with it. Len Davies was following the shot in and I think Dan must have had one eye on him. The result was that he didn't take it cleanly and it squirmed under him and over the line. Len jumped over him and into the net, but never actually touched it."

Ferguson's goal led Cardiff to become the only team from outside England to have won the competition as they went on to win the match 1–0. His 26 league goals and 6 in the team's FA Cup run set a new club record for goals in a season with 32. The record stood until 2003 when Robert Earnshaw scored 35 in a single season. The following season, Ferguson netted seven times in his first ten league matches and also scored in a 2–1 victory over amateur side Corinthians in the 1927 FA Charity Shield on 12 October. Cardiff finished the season in sixth place but Ferguson's later months were hampered by injuries; he never played more than three consecutive league matches after the Christmas period. Despite this, he was again Cardiff's top goalscorer, netting 18 times in the league. In April 1928, he scored both goals in the final of the Welsh Cup as Cardiff defeated Bangor 2–0.

Ferguson scored a penalty on the opening day of the 1928–29 season to give his side a 1–1 draw against Newcastle United. In the team's second match, he set a club record for goals in a league game after scoring five times against Burnley on 1 September 1928 as Cardiff ran out 7–0 winners. After eight matches, he led the First Division as its top goalscorer with ten goals. His scoring saw him surpass Steve Bloomer as the highest-scoring player in Scottish and English football on 352 goals, doing so in less time. He then began to suffer from persistent injury problems and, after playing in a 1–0 defeat to Aston Villa at the end of September, he made only three further appearances before Christmas. This coincided with a drop in form for Cardiff, who scored only 7 times in their next 13 games, during which the Western Mail bemoaned Ferguson's absence. He made his final league appearance for Cardiff on 23 February 1929, scoring in a 2–2 draw against Manchester United. With Cardiff struggling to avoid relegation and suffering financial problems, Ferguson was named as one of 12 players for whom the club was looking to obtain offers. His position was further weakened by the signing of another centre-forward, Jimmy Munro. Despite playing only 20 of the club's 42 league matches, Ferguson finished as Cardiff's top goalscorer for the fourth consecutive season with 14 league goals. This was also his 14th consecutive season as the top goalscorer of his team, at both Motherwell and Cardiff. His last appearance for the club came on 1 May, when he played in a 3–0 defeat to Connah's Quay & Shotton in the Welsh Cup final.

=== Dundee ===
Ferguson returned to Scotland with Dundee in June 1929. Cardiff had hoped to recoup £1,000 (equivalent to £50,000 in 2025) for him but the transfer was eventually completed for around £800 (£40,000). Ferguson had openly expressed his preference to return to Motherwell, an option that the club considered, but the move never came to fruition. He made his debut for Dundee on the opening day of the season against Falkirk, and began the campaign at centre-forward but struggled to live up to his goalscoring reputation. His first goal for the club came in October, when he netted the only goal of the game against Queen's Park. The Dundee Courier later reported that he was "not enjoying the best of health" at the time but played on. He was later moved to outside right before being dropped from the side entirely. His final game for the club was a 3–0 victory over Heart of Midlothian on 14 December 1929. His performance in the match was criticised and he was subsequently dropped from the first team. It was later reported that he had been suffering severe cramp in his legs that had left him struggling to sprint.

== Death ==
Ferguson sank into depression and it was remarked that he displayed a "melancholy demeanour and evident physical suffering" in early January 1930 by his former colleagues at Motherwell. He had been suffering from insomnia for several months at the end of 1929 and had become worried about his health. On 8 January, he took his own life, gassing himself at Dundee's ground Dens Park after remaining behind following a training session. His body was discovered the next morning by painters working at the ground. He was next to a gas ring which had been turned on, and his head was covered by an overcoat. He was rushed to Dundee Royal Infirmary but was pronounced dead. His death has often been cited as being influenced by the barracking of the crowd as he failed to produce the form expected of him on his return to Scotland. In his last game for Dundee, he received considerable criticism from the crowd as he struggled with cramp. The Dundee Evening Telegraph remarked that, for Ferguson, "the experience of that afternoon was tremendously painful." William McIntosh, a director of Dundee, commented that "(Ferguson) did his best for Dundee and he took his failure to heart. His lack of success was certainly not due to lack of trying ... lately he became obsessed with the idea that his usefulness as a footballer had come to an end."

Aged 34, Ferguson left behind his wife Jessie and two children. Jessie was pregnant with the couple's third child at the time. His family have attributed his death to "an imbalance of his inner-ear" that had affected his balance and had led to his poor form. They believe this was caused by an undiagnosed brain tumour. Ferguson's body was moved from Dundee to Motherwell; four of his Dundee teammates carried his coffin to a waiting hearse while the remainder of the squad watched on. A small service was held at his home before he was buried in Airbles Cemetery in his hometown of Motherwell.

== Family and personal life ==
Ferguson was born in Motherwell on 2 March 1895 and had six brothers and one sister. His father was killed in a colliery accident when Ferguson was 16. He married Jessie Andrews on 21 March 1924 in his hometown. His uncle, also named Hugh Ferguson, was a politician and served as a Member of Parliament for Motherwell and he sometimes assisted his uncle at political gatherings. Ferguson's son Jack later went on to represent Britain in water polo at the 1952 and 1956 Olympics. His daughter Sadie later married Dunfermline player James Hogg, brother of Scottish international Bobby Hogg.

Ferguson was regarded as a clean-living player: He was teetotal, never smoked and attended church. He was also interested in and kept birds, displaying them in competitions organised by the Motherwell and District Cage Bird Association. He won his category while finishing runner-up in another in 1923 with a goldfinch mule and won several awards the following year.

== Style of play ==
Ferguson's main attribute was his finishing ability; the Sporting Chronicle noted after his senior debut for Motherwell in 1916 that he "possessed all the physical qualities required in a centre-forward, and is unquestionably a fine marksman". At the end of his first senior season, the Daily Record wrote "Hugh can draw out the opposition, he can get a fair amount of work on the ball and he never forgets where the goal lies". The paper also referred to his physicality, noting that while it was not a major aspect of his game "he is no pigmy. He can take a knock, he can return one." Upon his signing for Cardiff in 1925, the Western Mail described him as "not a particularly big man but he is very wiry and nippy".

He was also renowned for his modesty and sense of fair play. John Hunter, who managed Ferguson at Motherwell, described him as "irreproachable in conduct, a fine upright fellow, he was above all else a gentleman." One such example of this came in a league match against Hibernian while playing for Motherwell. Opposition goalkeeper Bill Harper had sustained an injury and the opportunity came to Ferguson to take advantage of this when he struggled to gather the ball from a cross. Rather than capitalise on Harper's misfortune, Ferguson allowed the keeper to recover and stop a certain goal.

=== Scoring records ===
Despite his performances for Motherwell, Ferguson was never selected for the Scotland national side. At the time of his departure from the club in 1925, Ferguson was the highest scoring player in the history of the Scottish League. He was later surpassed by Jimmy McGrory and Bob McPhail. He is one of only seven players to have scored more than 350 league goals in the history of Scottish and English football, finishing his career with a goal ratio per game of 0.855.

For many years Ferguson held the Motherwell club record for scoring goals in consecutive games, until it was broken by Kevin van Veen in 2023.

== Career statistics ==
Appearances and goals by club, season and competition
Club	Season	League			FA Cup		Other (Note: Includes other competitive competitions, including the FA Charity Shield and the Welsh Cup)		Total	
Club	Season	Division	Apps	Goals	Apps	Goals	Apps	Goals	Apps	Goals
Motherwell	1916–17	Scottish Division One	29	25	–		–		29	25
Motherwell	1917–18	Scottish Division One	31	34	–		–		31	34
Motherwell	1918–19	Scottish Division One	26	19	–		–		26	19
Motherwell	1919–20	Scottish Division One	35	33	1	1	–		36	34
Motherwell	1920–21	Scottish Division One	36	42	6	6	–		42	48
Motherwell	1921–22	Scottish Division One	33	35	4	3	–		37	38
Motherwell	1922–23	Scottish Division One	29	29	5	7	–		34	36
Motherwell	1923–24	Scottish Division One	33	27	3	4	–		36	31
Motherwell	1924–25	Scottish Division One	37	28	4	6	–		41	34
Motherwell	1925–26	Scottish Division One	12	12	0	0	–		12	12
Motherwell	Motherwell total		301	284	23	27	0	0	324	311
Cardiff City	1925–26	First Division	26	19	3	2	0	0	29	21
Cardiff City	1926–27	First Division	39	26	7	6	1	0	47	32
Cardiff City	1927–28	First Division	32	18	3	2	5	5	40	25
Cardiff City	1928–29	First Division	20	14	0	0	3	1	23	15
Cardiff City	Cardiff City total		117	77	13	10	9	6	139	92
Dundee	1929–30	Scottish Division One	17	2	0	0	–		17	2
Total			435	363	36	37	9	6	480	406

== Honours ==
Cardiff City

- FA Cup: 1926–27
- FA Charity Shield: 1927
- Welsh Cup: 1927–28; runner-up: 1928–29

Individual

- Scottish Division One top goalscorer: 1917–18, 1919–20, 1920–21

== See also ==
- List of footballers in Scotland by number of league goals (200+)
