= Joe Nicholson =

English footballer

Personal information
- Full name: Joseph Robinson Nicholson
- Date of birth: 4 June 1898
- Place of birth: Ryhope, England
- Date of death: 1974 (aged 75–76)
- Place of death: Durham, England
- Height: 6 ft 0 in (1.83 m)
- Positions: Wing-half; centre-forward

Senior career*
Years	Team	Apps	(Gls)
1919–1924	Clapton Orient	147	(4)
1924–1926	Cardiff City	47	(12)
1926–1927	Aston Villa	1	(0)
- * Club domestic league appearances and goals

Joseph Robinson Nicholson (born 4 June 1898 in Ryhope, died 1974) was an English professional footballer. He is most famous for playing for Cardiff City in the 1925 FA Cup Final.

== Career ==
After playing for local sides in his hometown of Ryhope, Nicholson began his Football League career in 1919 when he joined Clapton Orient, where he went on to play in nearly 150 games for the club. In 1924, Nicholson joined Cardiff City, competing with Harry Wake for the right-half position before being moved to centre-forward, in place of the injured Len Davies, and his performances in attack helped the club reach the 1925 FA Cup Final, Nicholson scoring against Blackburn Rovers in the semi-final.

At the end of the following season, Nicholson left Cardiff in a swap deal to sign for Aston Villa which saw George Blackburn move to Ninian Park in return. However his spell at Aston Villa was cut short due to injury and he moved into non-league football.

== Honours ==
Cardiff City

- FA Cup runner-up: 1924–25
