= Joe Hills =

English cricketer, Test match umpire, and footballer

Personal information
- Full name: Joseph John Hills
- Born: 14 October 1897; Plumstead, London, England
- Died: 21 September 1969 (aged 71); Westbourne, Bournemouth, Hampshire, England
- Batting: Right-handed
- Role: Wicketkeeper-batsman

Domestic team information
- Years: Team
- 1926–1931: Glamorgan

Career statistics
Competition	First-class
Matches	107
Runs scored	3474
Batting average	21.57
100s/50s	7/12
Top score	166
Catches/stumpings	95/4
- Source: Cricinfo, 11 April 2021

Joseph John Hills (14 October 1897 – 21 September 1969) was an English first-class cricketer, Test match umpire and professional footballer.

== Life and career ==
Born in London in 1897, Hills served in World War I with the Royal Engineers and was awarded the Military Medal for his bravery as a cabler and telegraphist during the Battle of Amiens.

Hills played professional football as a goalkeeper, moving to Wales when he was signed by Cardiff City in 1924. He also played for Swansea Town and Fulham before a serious injury to his right arm in 1927 ended his career.

Hills played 107 cricket matches for Glamorgan and Wales between 1926 and 1931. A wicket keeper and right-handed batsman, he took 95 catches, completed four stumpings, and scored 3474 runs at an average of 21.57 with a top score of 166 among his seven centuries. In 1929 he shared an unbroken ninth-wicket partnership of 203 with Johnnie Clay which is still a county record; at one stage they added 150 runs in 65 minutes. Glamorgan did not renew his contract after the 1931 season owing to the club's financial difficulties.

Hills became an umpire, standing in 286 first-class matches between 1937 and 1956. He umpired the England v South Africa Test at Leeds in 1947. He died in Hampshire in 1969.
