= Ebor Reed =

English footballer

Personal information
- Full name: Ebor Reed
- Date of birth: 30 November 1899
- Place of birth: Spennymoor, England
- Date of death: 1971 (aged 71–72)
- Place of death: Durham, England
- Height: 5 ft 9 in (1.75 m)
- Position: Defender

Senior career*
Years	Team	Apps	(Gls)
1922–1925	Newcastle United	0	(0)
1925–1926	Cardiff City	6	(0)
1926–1927	Nottingham Forest	5	(0)
1927–1929	Rotherham United	60	(0)
1929–1930	Derry City		
1930–1932	Dundalk	43	(1)
- Portadown
- * Club domestic league appearances and goals

Ebor Reed (30 November 1899 – 1971) was an English professional footballer who played as a defender. He played in the Football League for Cardiff City, Nottingham Forest and Rotherham United before playing for several teams in Ireland.

== Career ==
Born in Spennymoor, Reed began his career with Newcastle United in 1922. However, he struggled to break into the first team and left the club in 1925 without making a senior appearance. He instead joined Cardiff City where he made his professional debut in the Football League First Division, making six appearances during the 1925–26 season. He left the club at the end of the season and spent a similar one season spell with Nottingham Forest.

In 1927, he joined Third Division North side Rotherham United where he spent two seasons as a first team regular and made over 60 appearances in all competitions. He joined Derry City in 1929 ahead of their first season in the Irish League, scoring six times from the penalty spot during the season. However, at the end of his first season with Derry, he was unable to agree terms with the club for a second season after they refused his request of £5 per week in wages and a £50 signing fee.

He instead moved to Dundalk, helping the club finish as runner-up in the league and reach the final of the FAI Cup in his first season. The arrival of Albert Harrison the following season saw Reed move to an unfamiliar role at wing half. He played in the club's 7–3 victory over Shamrock Rovers in the final of the LFA President's Cup in September 1931 but the club's struggles in the league, coupled with financial difficulties, led to Reed and several other players being released at the end of the season. He later played for Portadown.

== Honours ==
Dundalk

- LFA President's Cup winner: 1931–32
