= Herbie Evans =

Welsh footballer

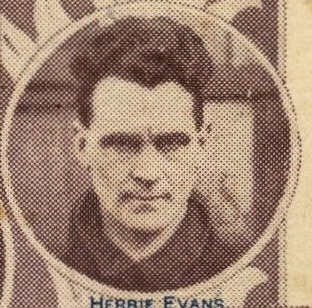

Personal information
- Full name: Herbert Price Evans
- Date of birth: 30 August 1894
- Place of birth: Llandaff, Wales
- Date of death: 19 November 1982 (aged 88)
- Place of death: Llandough, Penarth, Wales
- Height: 5 ft 7 in (1.70 m)
- Position: Midfielder

Senior career*
Years	Team	Apps	(Gls)
?–1920	Cardiff Corinthians	?	(?)
1920–1926	Cardiff City	93	(1)
1926–1927	Tranmere Rovers	?	(?)

International career
1922–1924	Wales	6	(0)
- * Club domestic league appearances and goals

Herbie Price Evans (30 August 1894 – 19 November 1982) was a Welsh professional footballer.

== Career ==
Evans was born in Llandaff, Cardiff. He played for Cardiff Corinthians when Cardiff City signed him in 1920 as part of the club's first season in the English Football League. Despite his signing with the club, he remained an amateur player until late into his spell, winning a Wales amateur cap when he played against England in 1922. Later that year, he also made his debut for the senior side on 4 February in a 2–1 win over Scotland.

He eventually turned professional for the club but suffered a broken leg shortly after, and a long recovery kept him out of league football for nearly two years. When he returned, he found his place taken by Harry Wake, and he left to join Tranmere Rovers in 1926, along with Alfie Hagan. However, he broke his other leg a year later and was forced to retire.

Evans was also a keen cricketer and played first-class cricket for Glamorgan in one match in 1922.
