= Denis Lawson (footballer) =

Scottish footballer (1897–1968)

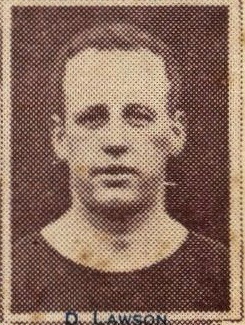

Personal information
- Date of birth: 11 December 1897
- Place of birth: Lennoxtown, Stirlingshire, Scotland
- Date of death: 23 May 1968 (aged 70)
- Place of death: Glasgow, Scotland
- Height: 5 ft 6 in (1.68 m)
- Position: Outside right

Senior career*
Years	Team	Apps	(Gls)
–	Kilsyth Emmett		
1919–1923	St Mirren	154	(11)
1923–1926	Cardiff City	64	(2)
1926	Springfield Babes	23	(2)
1926–1927	Providence Clamdiggers	16	(1)
1927–1928	Wigan Borough	28	(2)
1928–1929	Clyde	7	(1)
1930–1931	Brechin City	36	(2)

International career
1923	Scotland	1	(0)
- * Club domestic league appearances and goals

Denis Lawson (11 December 1897 – 23 May 1968) was a Scottish footballer who played as an outside-right.

He started playing professionally for St Mirren in 1920; in 1923 he moved to Cardiff City of the English Football League and played 64 matches for them, before moving to the United States and playing for Springfield Babes and Providence F.C. He returned to British football in 1927–28 with a move to Wigan Borough, and then finished his career back in Scotland with Clyde and Brechin City.

In 1923 Lawson was capped for Scotland, in a 2–2 draw with England at Hampden Park.
