= Percy Richards (Welsh footballer) =

Welsh footballer

Personal information
- Date of birth: 1906
- Place of birth: Merthyr Tydfil, Wales
- Height: 5 ft 9 in (1.75 m)
- Position: Outside forward

Senior career*
Years	Team	Apps	(Gls)
- Merthyr Vale
1926–1927	Cardiff City	3	(0)
1927–1928	Chesterfield	0	(0)
1928–1929	Tranmere Rovers		
1929	Newport County		
1929–1930	Merthyr Town		
1930–1932	Leicester City	10	(2)
1932–1934	Coventry City		
1934–1936	Bath City		
- Brierley Hill Alliance
- * Club domestic league appearances and goals

Percy Richards (1906 – after 1936) was a Welsh professional footballer who played as an outside forward.
