= Elvet Collins =

Welsh footballer

Personal information
- Full name: William Elvet Collins
- Date of birth: 16 October 1902
- Place of birth: Bedwellty, Wales
- Date of death: 1977
- Place of death: Newport, Wales
- Height: 5 ft 8 in (1.73 m)
- Position: Outside forward

Senior career*
Years	Team	Apps	(Gls)
- Rhymney Town
1923–1927	Cardiff City	12	(0)
1927–1929	Clapton Orient		
- Lovell's Athletic
- Llanelly
1932–?	Newport County		
- Llanelly

International career
1930	Wales	1	(0)
- * Club domestic league appearances and goals

William Elvet Collins (16 October 1902 – 1977) was a Welsh professional footballer and Wales international. Collins was spotted playing non-league football for Rhymney Town by Cardiff City, signing for the Bluebirds in 1923. He spent four years at Ninian Park but struggled to establish himself in the first-team, making 12 league appearances for the club. He left the club in 1929 to join Clapton Orient.

He also gained one cap for Wales in his career, playing 1 match on 25 October 1930 against Scotland, in a match that was dubbed "Keenor and the unknowns" in reference to captain Fred Keenor and the non-league and fringe players who made up the rest of the squad after Football League clubs had refused to release their Welsh players for the tie due to a fixture clash.

== See also ==
- List of Wales international footballers (alphabetical)
