= Alfie Hagan =

English footballer (1895–1980)

Personal information
- Full name: Alfred Hagan
- Date of birth: 10 November 1895
- Place of birth: Usworth, England
- Date of death: 1980 (aged 84–85)
- Height: 5 ft 6 in (1.68 m)
- Position: Inside forward

Senior career*
Years	Team	Apps	(Gls)
- Washington Colliery
1919–1923	Newcastle United	21	(5)
1923–1926	Cardiff City	9	(2)
1926–1927	Tranmere Rovers	12	(0)
- * Club domestic league appearances and goals

Alfred Hagan (10 November 1895 – 1980) was an English professional footballer who played as an inside forward.

== Early life ==
Hagan was born in Usworth and worked at the colliery in the town. He served as a private in the Northumberland Fusiliers during the First World War.

== Career ==
After playing local football for Washington Colliery, Hagan signed for Newcastle United in 1919. He moved to Cardiff City in 1923 but did not make his debut for the club until 26 December of that year, playing in a 3–1 victory over Sheffield United. He remained with the club for three seasons but struggled to break into the first team. He eventually joined Tranmere Rovers in 1926, along with Herbie Evans, where he finished his professional career.

== Personal life ==
Hagan's son Jimmy was also a professional footballer and won a single cap for England in 1948.
