= Irish Intermediate League =

- Organiser(s): Irish Football Association
- Founded: 1915
- Abolished: 1954
- Region: Northern Ireland (1921–1954); Ireland (1915–1921)
- Most championships: Crusaders (9 titles)

The Irish Intermediate League was a Northern Irish football competition for teams of intermediate status, which also included reserve sides of senior teams. The league ran from 1915 until 1954.

== History ==
It began in 1915 after the amalgamation of the Irish Junior League and Irish Senior Reserve League, and ran until 1954, when the majority of the remaining clubs applied to join the Irish League B Division, which had been formed in 1951. Until the introduction of the Irish League B Division it was the second tier of the Northern Ireland football league system.

The tournament also ran a cup tournament for members of the league, the McElroy Cup.

== List of champions ==
- 1915–16 Glentoran II*
- 1916–17 Belfast Celtic II*
- 1917–18 Belfast Celtic II*
- 1918–19 Glentoran II*
- 1919–20 Glentoran II*
- 1920–21 Brantwood
- 1921–22 Dundela
- 1922–23 Crusaders
- 1923–24 Dunmurry
- 1924–25 Brantwood
- 1925–26 Crusaders
- 1926–27 Crusaders
- 1927–28 Willowfield
- 1928–29 Crusaders
- 1929–30 Glentoran II*
- 1930–31 Crusaders
- 1931–32 Belfast Celtic II*
- 1932–33 Crusaders
- 1933–34 Belfast Celtic II*
- 1934–35 Belfast Celtic II*
- 1935–36 Belfast Celtic II*
- 1936–37 Belfast Celtic II*
- 1937–38 Crusaders
- 1938–39 Crusaders
- 1939–40 Linfield Swifts*
- 1940–41 Bangor Reserves*
- 1941–42 Aircraft United
- 1942–43 Bangor Reserves*
- 1943–44 Bangor Reserves*
- 1944–45 Dundela
- 1945–46 Linfield Swifts*
- 1946–47 Dundela
- 1947–48 Brantwood
- 1948–49 Crusaders
- 1949–50 Dundela
- 1950–51 Dundela
- 1951–52 Brantwood
- 1952–53 Larne
- 1953–54 Brantwood

NB - * denotes reserve teams of senior clubs

=== Performance by club ===
Team	No. of wins	Winning years
Crusaders	9	1922–23, 1925–26, 1926–27, 1928–29, 1930–31, 1932–33, 1937–38, 1938–39, 1948–49
Belfast Celtic II*	7	1916–17, 1917–18, 1931–32, 1933–34, 1934–35, 1935–36, 1936–37
Dundela	5	1921–22, 1944–45, 1946–47, 1949–50, 1950–51
Brantwood	5	1920–21, 1924–25, 1947–48, 1951–52, 1953–54
Glentoran II*	4	1915–16, 1918–19, 1919–20, 1929–30
Bangor Reserves*	3	1940–41, 1942–43, 1943–44
Linfield Swifts*	2	1939–40, 1945–46
Aircraft United	1	1941–42
Willowfield	1	1927–28

NB - * indicates reserve team

== List of McElroy Cup winners ==
- 1915–16 Glentoran II*
- 1916–17 Belfast Celtic II*
- 1917–18 Glentoran II*
- 1918–19 Distillery II*
- 1919–20 Cliftonville Olympic*
- 1920–21 Distillery II*
- 1921–22 St Mary's
- 1922–23 Belfast United
- 1923–24 St Mary's
- 1924–25 Brantwood / Dunmurry (shared)
- 1925–26 Linfield Rangers
- 1926–27 Dunmurry
- 1927–28 Broadway United
- 1928–29 Linfield Swifts*
- 1929–30 Crusaders
- 1930–31 Newington Rangers
- 1931–32 Crusaders
- 1932–33 Belfast Celtic II*
- 1933–34 Summerfield / Glentoran II* (shared)
- 1934–35 Belfast Celtic II*
- 1935–36 Belfast Celtic II*
- 1936–37 Belfast Celtic II*
- 1937–38 Linfield Swifts*
- 1938–39 Glentoran II*
- 1939–40 Linfield Swifts*
- 1940–41 Ards II*
- 1941–42 Ballyclare Comrades*
- 1942–43 Belfast Celtic II*
- 1943–44 Belfast Celtic II*
- 1944–45 Linfield Swifts*
- 1945–46 Dundela / Linfield Swifts* (shared)
- 1946–47 Bangor Reserves
- 1947–48 Crusaders
- 1948–49 Larne

NB - * denotes reserve teams of senior clubs

=== Performance by club ===
Team	No. of wins	Winning years
Belfast Celtic II*	7	1916–17, 1932–33, 1934–35, 1935–36, 1936–37, 1942–43, 1943–44
Linfield Swifts*	5	1928–29, 1937–38, 1939–40, 1944–45, 1945–46 (shared)
Glentoran II*	4	1915–16, 1917–18, 1933–34 (shared), 1938–39
Crusaders	3	1929–30, 1931–32, 1947–48
Distillery II*	2	1918–19, 1920–21
St Mary's	2	1921–22, 1922–24
Dunmurry	2	1924–25 (shared), 1926–27
Cliftonville Olympic*	1	1919–20
Belfast United	1	1922–23
Linfield Rangers	1	1925–26
Broadway United	1	1927–28
Newington Rangers	1	1930–31
Ards II	1	1940–41
Ballyclare Comrades	1	1941–42
Bangor Reserves*	1	1946–47
Larne	1	1948–49
Brantwood	1	1924–25 (shared)
Summerfield	1	1933–34 (shared)
Dundela	1	1945–46 (shared)

NB - * indicates reserve team
