= 1929–30 Irish League =

Irish League
- Season: 1929–30
- Champions: Linfield; 15th Irish title
- Matches played: 182
- Goals scored: 873 (4.8 per match)
- Top goalscorer: Joe Bambrick (50 goals)

Location of teams in the Irish League from 1929–34
Location of Belfast-based teams in the Irish League from 1929–34

The 1929–30 Irish League was the 36th edition of the Irish League, the highest level of league competition in Northern Irish football. The league comprised 14 teams, and Linfield won the championship.

== League standings ==
Pos	Team	Pld	W	D	L	GF	GA	GR	Pts	Result
1	Linfield (C)	26	19	4	3	94	46	2.043	42	Champions
2	Glentoran	26	16	4	6	79	53	1.491	36	
3	Coleraine	26	14	4	8	66	47	1.404	32	
4	Belfast Celtic	26	13	4	9	68	57	1.193	30	
5	Ballymena	26	13	3	10	65	46	1.413	29	
6	Bangor	26	12	5	9	61	58	1.052	29	
7	Derry City	26	12	5	9	52	55	0.945	29	
8	Glenavon	26	12	3	11	70	63	1.111	27	
9	Distillery	26	12	3	11	65	61	1.066	27	
10	Portadown	26	7	7	12	68	90	0.756	21	
11	Newry Town	26	9	1	16	51	66	0.773	19	
12	Ards	26	6	6	14	47	77	0.610	18	
13	Larne	26	5	3	18	47	77	0.610	13	
14	Cliftonville	26	5	2	19	40	77	0.519	12	

Source: rsssf.com
(C) Champions

== Results ==
Home \ Away	ARD	BAN	BLM	BCE	CLI	COL	DER	DIS	GLV	GLT	LAR	LIN	NEW	POR
Ards		4–4	0–2	1–2	2–1	2–3	1–2	1–1	3–5	1–5	2–1	1–3	3–2	4–2
Bangor	2–0		3–1	3–1	6–3	1–1	0–3	2–1	3–3	2–3	2–3	1–0	2–0	4–3
Ballymena	1–3	4–0		1–1	7–1	0–1	4–0	6–3	5–0	2–1	3–1	1–4	3–0	2–2
Belfast Celtic	6–1	1–2	4–3		7–2	1–1	4–0	1–5	4–3	1–2	4–1	2–5	1–4	5–1
Cliftonville	2–3	0–0	0–2	1–1		4–2	4–2	1–2	2–5	2–3	1–2	0–3	1–5	4–3
Coleraine	6–1	2–0	2–1	3–5	3–0		1–2	2–5	5–1	1–2	7–5	0–0	4–1	8–0
Derry City	2–2	3–2	1–1	3–1	4–3	0–0		1–1	2–0	1–2	2–1	2–6	2–0	5–2
Distillery	6–3	0–2	3–1	2–3	3–1	2–0	4–2		2–0	2–5	3–0	2–5	4–3	3–3
Glenavon	4–1	5–2	3–1	4–4	1–0	1–3	2–3	2–3		2–1	3–1	7–1	6–1	2–2
Glentoran	6–1	6–6	1–2	4–0	5–2	2–3	2–0	4–3	2–1		4–3	3–3	5–2	3–3
Larne	3–3	2–5	1–2	1–3	1–2	2–4	2–2	3–1	1–2	0–1		1–5	3–1	3–1
Linfield	2–2	3–1	4–7	3–1	1–0	7–1	2–0	4–2	5–3	3–1	7–1		6–1	3–3
Newry Town	3–1	1–3	2–0	0–2	2–3	1–0	2–3	2–0	3–1	3–2	2–2	2–4		5–0
Portadown	1–1	5–3	5–3	1–3	2–0	1–3	6–5	4–2	3–4	4–4	5–3	1–5	5–3	

Source: Irish League Archive
Legend: Blue = home team win; Yellow = draw; Red = away team win.
