= 1926–27 FA Cup =

Tournament details
- Country: England; Wales

Final positions
- Champions: (Wales) Cardiff City (1st title)
- Runners-up: Arsenal

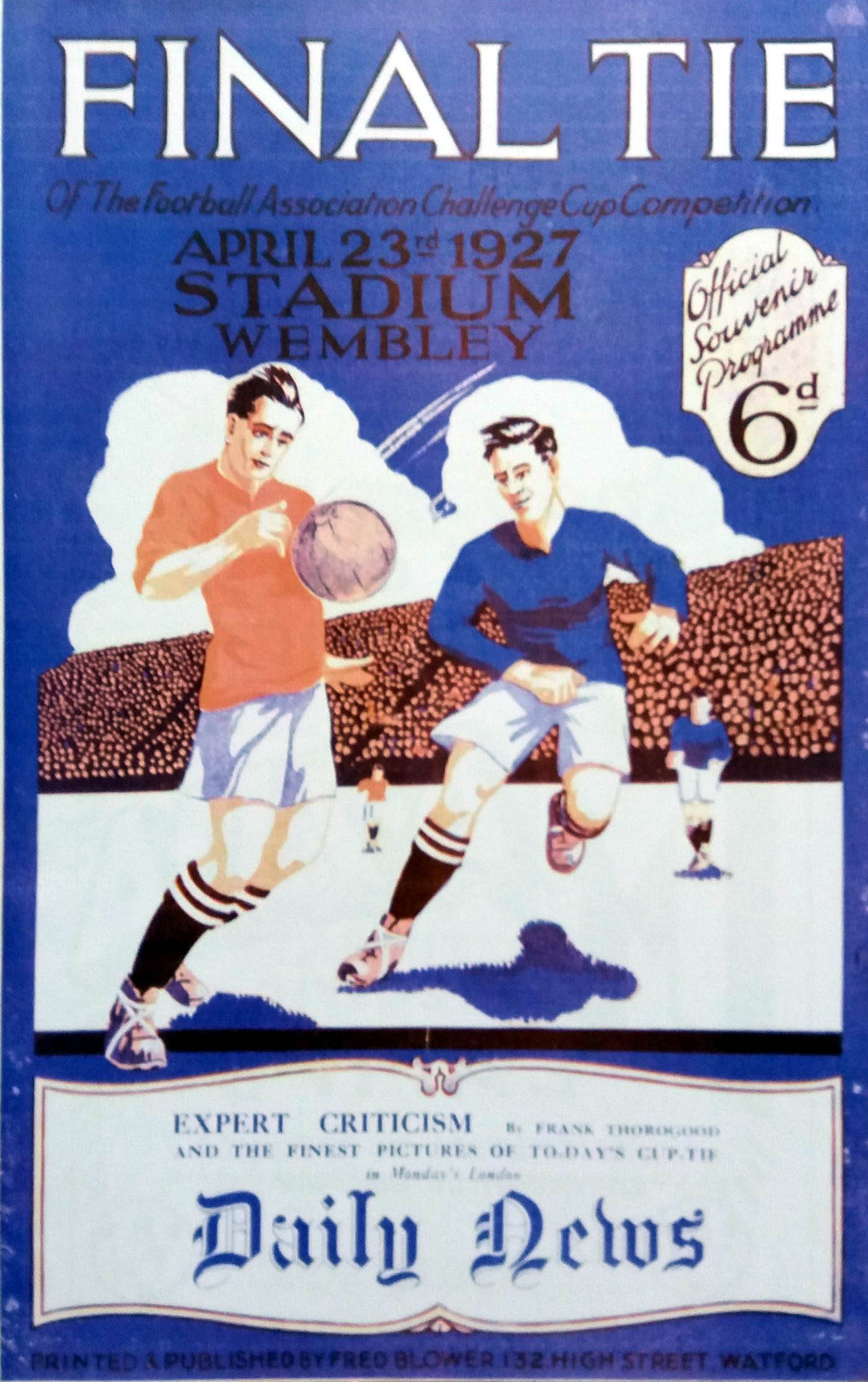

The 1926–27 FA Cup was the 52nd staging of the world's oldest football cup competition, the Football Association Challenge Cup, commonly known as the FA Cup. Welsh club Cardiff City won the competition for the first time, beating Arsenal 1–0 in the final at Wembley. As of 2026, it is the only FA Cup title won by a club from outside England.

Matches were scheduled to be played at the stadium of the team named first on the date specified for each round, which was always a Saturday. Some matches, however, might be rescheduled for other days if there were clashes with games for other competitions or the weather was inclement. If scores were level after 90 minutes had been played, a replay would take place at the stadium of the second-named team later the same week. If the replayed match was drawn further replays would be held until a winner was determined. If scores were level after 90 minutes had been played in a replay, a 30-minute period of extra time would be played.

== Calendar ==
Round	Date
Extra preliminary round	Saturday 4 September 1926
Preliminary round	Saturday 18 September 1926
First round qualifying	Saturday 2 October 1926
Second round qualifying	Saturday 16 October 1926
Third round qualifying	Saturday 30 October 1926
Fourth round qualifying	Saturday 13 November 1926
First round proper	Saturday 27 November 1926
Second round proper	Saturday 11 December 1926
Third round proper	Saturday 8 January 1927
Fourth round proper	Saturday 29 January 1927
Fifth round proper	Saturday 19 February 1927
Sixth round proper	Saturday 5 March 1927
Semi-Finals	Saturday 26 March 1927
Final	Saturday 23 April 1927

== Qualifying rounds ==
Most participating clubs that were not members of the Football League joined the competition in the qualifying rounds.

The 25 winners from this season's fourth qualifying round were Chilton Colliery Recreation, Bishop Auckland, Crook Town, Bedlington United, Annfield Plain, Carlisle United, Workington, Rhyl, Mexborough Athletic, York City, Boston Town, Wellington Town, Mansfield Town, Kettering Town, Desborough Town, Lowestoft Town, Barnet, Chatham, Sittingbourne, Woking, Kingstonian, Barking Town, Nunhead, Poole and Weymouth.

Those featuring at this stage for the first time were Bedlington United, Annfield Plain, Rhyl, York City, Desborough Town, Lowestoft Town, Kingstonian, Barking, Nunhead and Poole, while Woking progressed to the main draw for the first time since 1907-08.

The most successful sides from this season's extra preliminary round were Burscough Rangers and Kidderminster Harriers, who progressed to the third qualifying round before losing to Lancaster Town and Willenhall respectively.

== First round proper ==
At this stage 40 clubs from the Football League Third Division North and South joined the 25 non-league clubs who came through the qualifying rounds. Millwall and Plymouth Argyle were given byes to the third round, while Durham City and Queens Park Rangers did not enter this season's competition. Two Second Division sides, Reading and Grimsby Town were entered at this stage. To bring the number of participating teams up to 76, nine non-league sides were given byes to this round. These were:

- Clapton
- St Albans City
- London Caledonians
- Northern Nomads
- Stockton
- Northfleet United
- Dulwich Hamlet
- Torquay United
- Worksop Town

Northern Nomads (who were mainly based in Glossop at this time) and Stockton were the champion and finalist from the previous season's FA Amateur Cup.

38 matches were scheduled to be played on Saturday, 27 November 1926. Eleven matches were drawn and went to replays in the following midweek fixture, of which two went to another replay.

Tie no	Home team	Score	Away team	Date
1	Chesterfield	2–1	Mexborough Athletic	27 November 1926
2	Clapton	1–1	Brentford	27 November 1926
Replay	Brentford	7–3	Clapton	1 December 1926
3	Bournemouth & Boscombe Athletic	1–1	Swindon Town	27 November 1926
Replay	Swindon Town	3–4	Bournemouth & Boscombe Athletic	29 November 1926
4	Barking Town	0–0	Gillingham	27 November 1926
Replay	Gillingham	2–0	Barking Town	1 December 1926
5	Nelson	4–1	Stockport County	27 November 1926
6	Watford	10–1	Lowestoft Town	27 November 1926
7	Reading	4–4	Weymouth	27 November 1926
Replay	Reading	5–0	Weymouth	1 December 1926
8	Walsall	1–0	Bradford Park Avenue	27 November 1926
9	Woking	1–3	Charlton Athletic	27 November 1926
10	Chatham	3–1	St Albans City	27 November 1926
11	Grimsby Town	3–2	Halifax Town	27 November 1926
12	Crewe Alexandra	4–1	Northern Nomads	27 November 1926
13	Lincoln City	2–0	Rotherham United	27 November 1926
14	Luton Town	4–2	London Caledonians	27 November 1926
15	Boston	1–1	Northampton Town	27 November 1926
Replay	Northampton Town	2–1	Boston	2 December 1926
16	Stockton	1–2	Ashington	27 November 1926
17	Doncaster Rovers	3–0	Desborough Town	2 December 1926
18	Wrexham	1–1	New Brighton	27 November 1926
Replay	New Brighton	2–2	Wrexham	1 December 1926
Replay	Wrexham	3–1	New Brighton	6 December 1926
19	Bishop Auckland	0–1	Bedlington United	27 November 1926
20	Poole	1–0	Newport County	27 November 1926
21	Sittingbourne	1–3	Northfleet United	27 November 1926
22	Wellington Town	1–2	Mansfield Town	27 November 1926
23	Accrington Stanley	4–3	Rochdale	27 November 1926
24	Brighton & Hove Albion	3–0	Barnet	27 November 1926
25	Carlisle United	6–2	Hartlepools United	27 November 1926
26	Nunhead	9–0	Kingstonian	27 November 1926
27	Crystal Palace	0–0	Norwich City	27 November 1926
Replay	Norwich City	1–0	Crystal Palace	1 December 1926
28	Annfield Plain	2–4	Chilton Colliery Recreation	27 November 1926
29	Exeter City	3–0	Aberdare Athletic	27 November 1926
30	Merthyr Town	0–2	Bristol City	27 November 1926
31	Southport	1–1	Tranmere Rovers	27 November 1926
Replay	Tranmere Rovers	1–2	Southport	2 December 1926
32	Dulwich Hamlet	1–4	Southend United	27 November 1926
33	Torquay United	1–1	Bristol Rovers	27 November 1926
Replay	Bristol Rovers	1–0	Torquay United	1 December 1926
34	Workington	1–2	Crook Town	27 November 1926
35	Wigan Borough	2–2	Barrow	2 December 1926
Replay	Barrow	0–1	Wigan Borough	6 December 1926
36	York City	4–1	Worksop Town	1 December 1926
37	Rhyl	1–1	Stoke City	27 November 1926
Replay	Stoke City	1–1	Rhyl	2 December 1926
Replay	Rhyl	2–1	Stoke City	6 December 1926
38	Kettering Town	2–3	Coventry City	27 November 1926

== Second round proper ==
The matches were played on Saturday, 11 December 1926. Three matches were drawn, with replays taking place in the following midweek fixture.

Tie no	Home team	Score	Away team	Date
1	Ashington	2–1	Nelson	11 December 1926
2	Bristol City	1–1	Bournemouth & Boscombe Athletic	11 December 1926
Replay	Bournemouth & Boscombe Athletic	2–0	Bristol City	15 December 1926
3	Watford	0–1	Brighton & Hove Albion	11 December 1926
4	Reading	3–2	Southend United	11 December 1926
5	Walsall	2–0	Mansfield Town	11 December 1926
6	Gillingham	1–1	Brentford	11 December 1926
Replay	Brentford	1–0	Gillingham	15 December 1926
7	Grimsby Town	2–1	York City	11 December 1926
8	Crewe Alexandra	4–1	Wigan Borough	11 December 1926
9	Luton Town	6–2	Northfleet United	11 December 1926
10	Doncaster Rovers	0–1	Chesterfield	11 December 1926
11	Bristol Rovers	4–1	Charlton Athletic	11 December 1926
12	Coventry City	1–1	Lincoln City	11 December 1926
Replay	Lincoln City	2–1	Coventry City	15 December 1926
13	Norwich City	5–0	Chatham	11 December 1926
14	Carlisle United	4–0	Bedlington United	11 December 1926
15	Nunhead	1–2	Poole	11 December 1926
16	Exeter City	1–0	Northampton Town	11 December 1926
17	Southport	2–0	Crook Town	11 December 1926
18	Rhyl	3–1	Wrexham	11 December 1926
19	Chilton Colliery Recreation	0–3	Accrington Stanley	11 December 1926

== Third round proper ==
42 of the 44 First and Second Division clubs entered the competition at this stage, along with Third Division Millwall and Plymouth Argyle. Also given a bye to this round of the draw was amateur side Corinthian. Carlisle United, Poole and Rhyl were last teams from the qualifying rounds remaining in the competition.

The matches were scheduled for Saturday, 8 January 1927. Four matches were drawn and went to replays in the following midweek fixture, of which one went to a second replay.

Tie no	Home team	Score	Away team	Date
1	Ashington	0–2	Nottingham Forest	8 January 1927
2	Birmingham	4–1	Manchester City	8 January 1927
3	Blackpool	1–3	Bolton Wanderers	8 January 1927
4	Darlington	2–1	Rhyl	8 January 1927
5	Bournemouth & Boscombe Athletic	1–1	Liverpool	8 January 1927
Replay	Liverpool	4–1	Bournemouth & Boscombe Athletic	12 January 1927
6	Burnley	3–1	Grimsby Town	8 January 1927
7	South Shields	3–1	Plymouth Argyle	8 January 1927
8	Southampton	3–0	Norwich City	8 January 1927
9	Reading	1–1	Manchester United	8 January 1927
Replay	Manchester United	2–2	Reading	12 January 1927
Replay	Reading	2–1	Manchester United	17 January 1927
10	Walsall	0–4	Corinthian	8 January 1927
11	The Wednesday	2–0	Brighton & Hove Albion	8 January 1927
12	Middlesbrough	5–3	Leicester City	8 January 1927
13	Lincoln City	2–4	Preston North End	8 January 1927
14	Everton	3–1	Poole	8 January 1927
15	Sheffield United	2–3	Arsenal	8 January 1927
16	Newcastle United	8–1	Notts County	8 January 1927
17	Fulham	4–3	Chesterfield	8 January 1927
18	Barnsley	6–1	Crewe Alexandra	8 January 1927
19	Bristol Rovers	3–3	Portsmouth	8 January 1927
Replay	Portsmouth	4–0	Bristol Rovers	12 January 1927
20	West Ham United	3–2	Tottenham Hotspur	8 January 1927
21	Bradford City	2–6	Derby County	8 January 1927
22	Millwall	3–1	Huddersfield Town	8 January 1927
23	Hull City	2–1	West Bromwich Albion	8 January 1927
24	Carlisle United	0–2	Wolverhampton Wanderers	8 January 1927
25	Clapton Orient	1–1	Port Vale	8 January 1927
Replay	Port Vale	5–1	Clapton Orient	12 January 1927
26	Oldham Athletic	2–4	Brentford	10 January 1927
27	Chelsea	4–0	Luton Town	8 January 1927
28	Exeter City	0–2	Accrington Stanley	8 January 1927
29	Cardiff City	2–1	Aston Villa	8 January 1927
30	Swansea Town	4–1	Bury	8 January 1927
31	Southport	2–0	Blackburn Rovers	8 January 1927
32	Leeds United	3–2	Sunderland	8 January 1927

== Fourth round proper ==
The matches were scheduled for Saturday, 29 January 1927. Five games were drawn and went to replays in the following midweek fixture, of which one went to a second replay.

Tie no	Home team	Score	Away team	Date
1	Darlington	0–2	Cardiff City	29 January 1927
2	Liverpool	3–1	Southport	29 January 1927
3	Preston North End	0–3	Middlesbrough	29 January 1927
4	Southampton	4–1	Birmingham	29 January 1927
5	Reading	3–1	Portsmouth	29 January 1927
6	The Wednesday	1–1	South Shields	29 January 1927
Replay	South Shields	1–0	The Wednesday	2 February 1927
7	Wolverhampton Wanderers	2–0	Nottingham Forest	29 January 1927
8	Derby County	0–2	Millwall	29 January 1927
9	Fulham	0–4	Burnley	29 January 1927
10	Barnsley	1–3	Swansea Town	29 January 1927
11	West Ham United	1–1	Brentford	29 January 1927
Replay	Brentford	2–0	West Ham United	2 February 1927
12	Hull City	1–1	Everton	29 January 1927
Replay	Everton	2–2	Hull City	2 February 1927
Replay	Hull City	3–2	Everton	7 February 1927
13	Chelsea	7–2	Accrington Stanley	29 January 1927
14	Port Vale	2–2	Arsenal	29 January 1927
Replay	Arsenal	1–0	Port Vale	2 February 1927
15	Leeds United	0–0	Bolton Wanderers	29 January 1927
Replay	Bolton Wanderers	3–0	Leeds United	2 February 1927
16	Corinthian	1–3	Newcastle United	29 January 1927

== Fifth round proper ==
The matches were scheduled for Saturday, 19 February 1927. There was one replay, played in the next midweek fixture.

Tie no	Home team	Score	Away team	Date
1	South Shields	2–2	Swansea Town	19 February 1927
Replay	Swansea Town	2–1	South Shields	24 February 1927
2	Southampton	2–1	Newcastle United	19 February 1927
3	Reading	1–0	Brentford	19 February 1927
4	Bolton Wanderers	0–2	Cardiff City	19 February 1927
5	Wolverhampton Wanderers	1–0	Hull City	19 February 1927
6	Millwall	3–2	Middlesbrough	19 February 1927
7	Chelsea	2–1	Burnley	19 February 1927
8	Arsenal	2–0	Liverpool	19 February 1927

== Sixth round proper ==
The four sixth round ties were scheduled to be played on Saturday, 5 March 1927. There were two replays, played in the following midweek fixture.

Tie no	Home team	Score	Away team	Date
1	Millwall	0–0	Southampton	5 March 1927
Replay	Southampton	2–0	Millwall	9 March 1927
2	Chelsea	0–0	Cardiff City	5 March 1927
Replay	Cardiff City	3–2	Chelsea	9 March 1927
3	Swansea Town	1–3	Reading	5 March 1927
4	Arsenal	2–1	Wolverhampton Wanderers	5 March 1927

== Semi-finals ==
The semi-final matches were played on Saturday, 26 March 1927. Cardiff City and Arsenal went on to meet in the final at Wembley.

26 March 1927
15:00

Cardiff City	3–0	Reading

Molineux, Wolverhampton

26 March 1927
15:00

Arsenal	2–1	Southampton
Hulme, Buchan		Rawlings

Stamford Bridge, London

== Final ==
The 1927 FA Cup Final was won by Cardiff City, who beat Arsenal 1–0. It is most remembered for Arsenal goalkeeper Dan Lewis' mistake which led to the only goal of the game. It was also the first ever Cup Final to be broadcast by BBC Radio. Commentators were Derek McCulloch and George Allison, who would later manage Arsenal.

=== Match details ===
23 April 1927
15:00 BST

Cardiff City	1–0	Arsenal
Ferguson 74'

Wembley, London
Attendance: 91,206
Referee: W. F. Bunnell (Preston)

Cardiff City	Arsenal

== See also ==
- FA Cup Final
