= List of Sheffield United F.C. players =

Bill 'Fatty' Foulke, United's international goalkeeper famous for his huge size, who played over 350 times for the club.

Sheffield United Football Club is an English professional football club who play at Bramall Lane in Sheffield. They were formed in 1889 and played their first competitive match in October of that year, when they entered the first qualifying round of the FA Cup. Since then more than 1,000 players have made a competitive first-team appearance for the club, of whom almost 200 players have made at least 100 appearances (including substitute appearances); those players are listed here.

== Overview ==
Defender and at times captain Joe Shaw remains the club's record appearance maker, playing over 700 games for the club between 1944 and 1966. The only other players who have made over 600 appearances for The Blades are Shaw's teammate and England goalkeeper Alan Hodgkinson, and forward Alan Woodward who played from 1964 to 1978. United's leading goalscorer is 'Young' Harry Johnson (his similarly named father had also played for the club) who remains the only player to have scored over 200 times for The Blades during his fifteen-year tenure from 1916 to 1931.

The first player to play 100 competitive games for the club was the team's first goal keeper Charlie Howlett, whilst the most recent player to achieve the feat is midfielder Gustavo Hamer, who achieved this feat in November 2025 Hamer is the only member of the current squad to feature on this list.

== Explanation of list ==
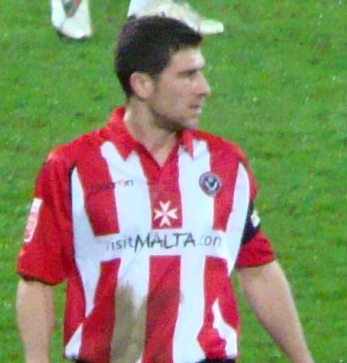
Midfielder Nick Montgomery made almost 400 appearances for United during a twelve-year spell.

Players are listed in alphabetical order of their surname. Appearances, substitute appearances and goals are included but wartime matches and friendlies are excluded. Further information on competitions/seasons which are regarded as eligible for appearance stats are provided below (dependent on the years at which the player was at the club), and if any data is not available for any of these competitions an appropriate note should be added to the table.

=== Appearances ===
Games included in the stats include appearances in:

- Midland Football League, Northern League, English Football League/Premier League
- Test matches and play-off matches
- FA Cup, Football League Cup, Football League Trophy, Football League Group Cup, Texaco Cup, Anglo-Scottish Cup, Anglo-Italian Cup, Watney Cup
- Friendly matches, exhibition games, and pre-season tournaments are excluded from the figures. Games played during both World Wars are considered friendlies and therefore are also not counted.

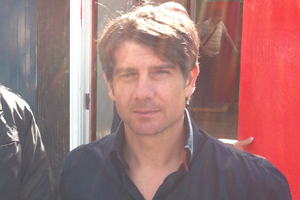
Over 50% of Canadian striker Paul Peschisolido's appearances came as a substitute.

=== Table headers ===
- Nationality – If a player played international football, the country/countries he played for are shown. Otherwise, the player's nationality is given as their country of birth.
- Sheffield United career – The year of the player's first appearance for Sheffield United to the year of his last appearance. Where a player had more than one spell at the club these are listed chronologically.
- Starts – The number of games started.
- Sub – The number of games played as a substitute.
- Total – The total number of games played, both as a starter and as a substitute.

=== Key ===
- Playing positions: GK = Goalkeeper; DF = Defender; MF = Midfielder; FW = Forward
- † Players with this colour and symbol in the "Name" column are currently signed to Sheffield United.

== List of players ==
As of 23 May 2026

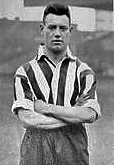
English international Bobby Barclay who made over 250 appearances for United in the 1930s.

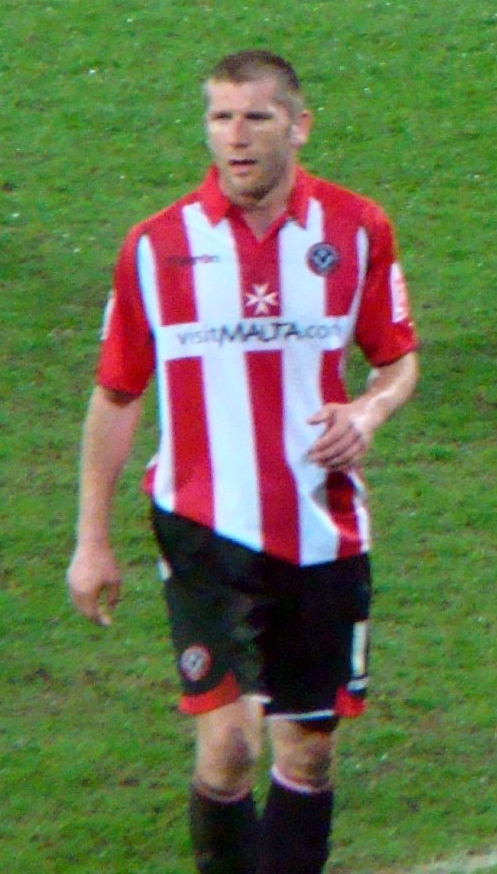
Forward Richard Cresswell made over 100 appearances for United.

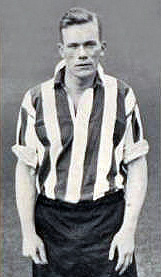
Irishman Jimmy Dunne made 190 appearances for The Blades between the wars scoring 167 goals.

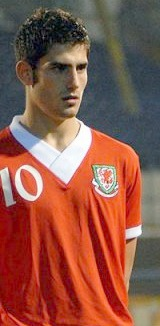
Welsh international and former forward Ched Evans made over 100 appearances for the Blades.

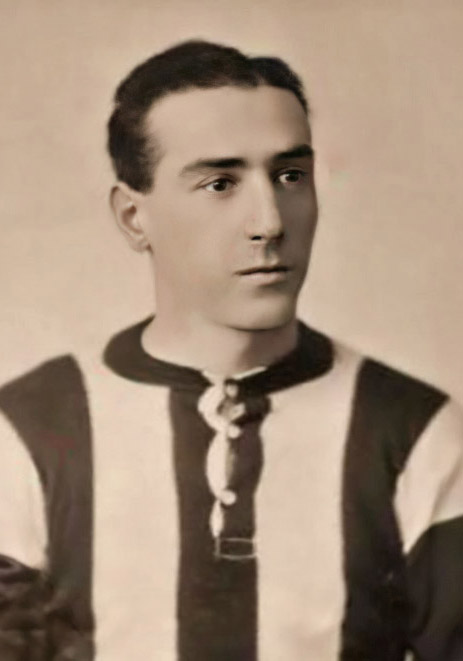
Inspirational captain and FA Cup winner Billy Gillespie played over 500 times for The Blades.

Billy Hendry was one of United's first 'star players'.

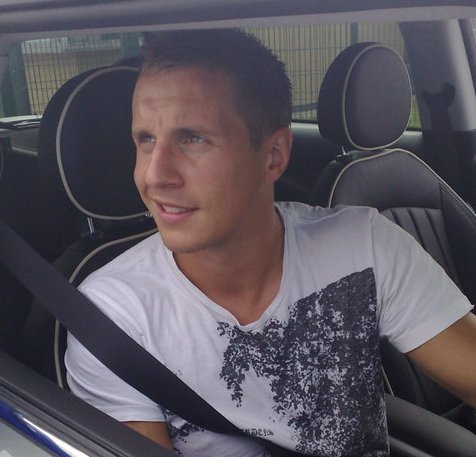
England International Phil Jagielka made over 250 appearances for United.

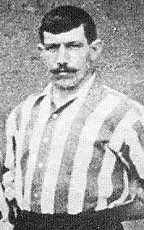
Ernest Needham made over 500 appearances for United.

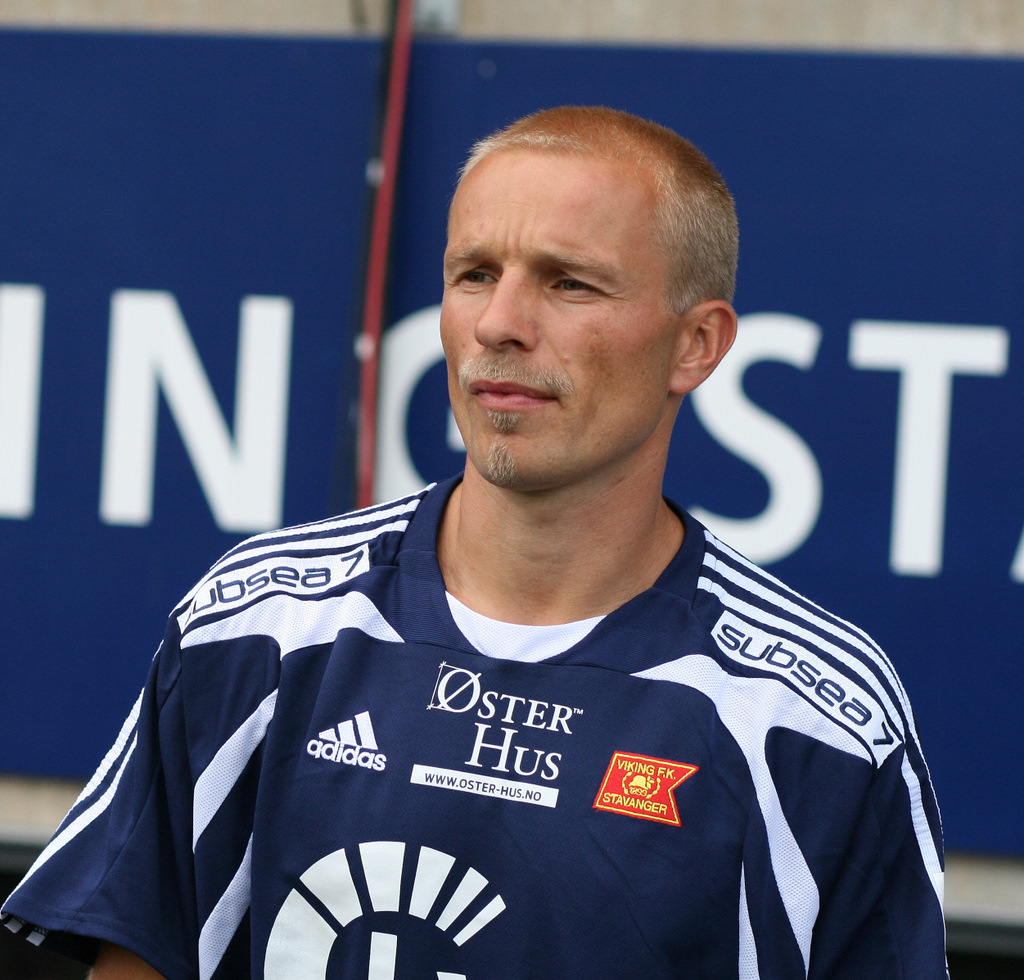
Norwegian international Roger Nilsen made almost 200 appearances for United.

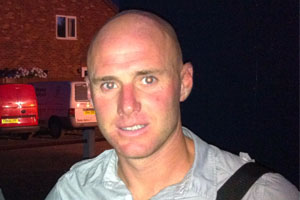
Welsh international Rob Page was a mainstay of the Blades defence in the early part of the 21st century.

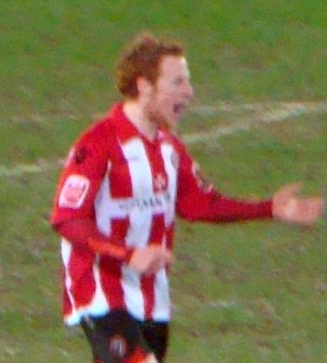
Irish midfielder Stephen Quinn made over 250 appearances for United.

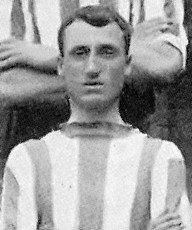
England International Albert Sturgess made 382 appearances for United.

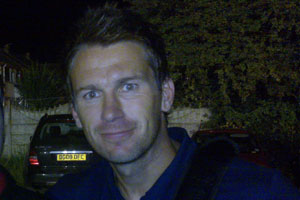
Welsh International Gareth Taylor made over 100 appearances for United.

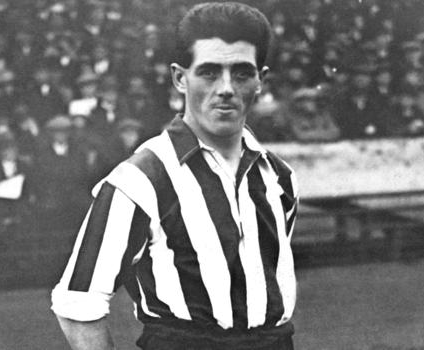
England International Fred Tunstall scored 135 times in just under 500 appearances for United.

George Utley made over 100 appearances for United.

List of Sheffield United F.C. players with at least 100 appearances
Name	Nationality	Position	Sheffield United career	Starts	Subs	Total	Goals	Ref
Name	Nationality	Position	Sheffield United career	Appearances			Goals	Ref
Colin Addison	England	FW	1967–1971	110	2	112	26	
Tony Agana	England	FW	1988–1991	139	15	154	52	
Anel Ahmedhodžić	Bosnia and Herzegovina	DF	2022–2025	107	7	114	12	
Jack Alderson	England	GK	1925–1928	137	0	137	0	
Len Allchurch	England	MF	1961–1965	146	0	146	37	
Jack Almond	England	FW	1896–1901	125	0	125	21	
Chris Armstrong	Scotland	MF	2003–2008	84	21	105	6	
Kevin Arnott	England	MF	1982–1987	151	2	153	15	
Len Badger	England	DF	1962–1976	541	2	543	8	
George Baldock	Greece	DF	2017–2024	205	6	219	6	
Chris Basham	England	DF	2014–2024	344	11	394	14	
Bobby Barclay	England	MF	1931–1937	256	0	256	72	
Frank Barlow	England	MF	1965–1972	137	7	144	3	
David Barnes	England	DF	1989–1994	107	0	107	1	
Harold Barton	England	MF	1934–1943	214	0	214	47	
Paul Beesley	England	DF	1990–1995	186	9	195	9	
Walter Bennett	England	FW	1896–1905	234	0	234	70	
Bob Benson	England	DF	1905–1913	285	0	285	21	
Alan Birchenall	England	FW	1964–1967	123	1	124	37	
Len Birks	England	DF	1924–1931	220	0	220	0	
Jayden Bogle	England	DF	2020–2024	88	10	103	12	
Joe Bolton	England	DF	1983–1986	130	0	130	6	
Bob Booker	England	MF	1988–1991	109	22	131	13	
Peter Boyle	Republic of Ireland	DF	1898–1894	187	0	187	1	
Tommy Boyle	England	MF	1922–1928	137	0	137	40	
Carl Bradshaw	England	MF	1989–1994	148	27	175	13	
Bill Brelsford	England	DF	1909–1922	299	0	299	1	
Leigh Bromby	England	DF	2004–2008; 2009	126	14	140	7	
Harold Brook	England	FW	1940–1954	257	0	257	101	
Arthur Brown	England	FW	1902–1908	187	0	187	114	
Jim Brown	Scotland	GK	1974–1978	203	0	203	0	
Michael Brown	England	MF	1999–2003	168	6	172	35	
Ian Bryson	Scotland	MF	1988–1993	177	23	200	44	
Ted Burgin	England	GK	1949–1957	314	0	314	0	
John Burridge	England	GK	1984–1987	125	0	125	0	
Bob Cain	Scotland	DF	1891–1898	220	0	220	3	
Steve Charles	England	FW	1980–1984	144	12	156	14	
Cec Coldwell	England	DF	1952–1966	477	1	475	2	
Colin Collindridge	England	FW	1939–1952	155	0	155	59	
Neill Collins	Scotland	DF	2006 (loan); 2011–2016	168	2	170	9	
Eddie Colquhoun	Scotland	DF	1968–1978	430	3	433	23	
Steve Conroy	England	GK	1974–1984	135	3	138	0	
Bill Cook	England	DF	1912–1927	324	0	324	0	
Albert Cox	England	DF	1935–1952	302	0	302	6	
Richard Cresswell	England	FW	2009–2013	103	38	141	30	
Tony Currie	England	FW	1968–1976	377	1	378	68	
Brian Deane	England	FW	1988–1993; 1997–1998; 2006	270	5	275	119	
Bill Dearden	England	FW	1970–1975	204	7	211	72	
Paul Devlin	Scotland	FW	1998–2002	141	28	169	29	
Jock Dodds	Scotland	FW	1934–1939	203	0	203	130	
Michael Doyle	Republic of Ireland	MF	2011–2015	175	13	188	9	
Jimmy Dunne	Republic of Ireland	FW	1926–1933	190	0	190	167	
Keith Eddy	England	MF	1972–1976	134	2	136	21	
Keith Edwards	England	FW	1976–1978; 1981–1986	293	18	311	170	
John Egan	Republic of Ireland	DF	2018–2024	208	7	223	8	
Ched Evans	Wales	FW	2009–2012	86	27	113	48	
Robert Evans	England	MF	1908–1918	218	0	218	39	
Stan Fazackerley	England	FW	1913–1920	119	0	119	47	
John Fleck	Scotland	MF	2016–2024	245	33	278	16	
John Flynn	England	DF	1969–1978	226	7	234	10	
Ryan Flynn	Scotland	MF	2011–2016	98	23	121	13	
Bobby Ford	England	MF	1997–2002	164	23	187	7	
William Foulke	England	GK	1894–1905	352	0	352	0	
Colin Franks	England	MF	1973–1979	170	12	182	10	
Kieron Freeman	England	DF	2015–2020	111	14	129	17	
Fred Furniss	England	DF	1941–1955	320	0	320	15	
Kevin Gage	England	DF	1991–1995	124	17	141	7	
John Gannon	England	MF	1989–1996	196	13	209	8	
Paul Garner	England	MF	1975–1984	297	4	301	11	
Derek Geary	Republic of Ireland	DF	2004–2010	111	14	125	1	
Sidney Gibson	England	FW	1928–1932	118	0	118	29	
Keith Gillespie	Northern Ireland	MF	2005–2009	62	41	103	4	
Billy Gillespie	Republic of Ireland	FW	1911–1931	507	0	507	142	
Harry Gooney	England	MF	1930–1935	148	0	148	2	
Harold Gough	England	GK	1913–1924	265	0	265	0	
George Green	England	DF	1923–1934	438	0	438	0	
Jimmy Hagan	England	FW	1938–1957	407	0	407	151	
Gustavo Hamer	Netherlands	MF	2023–present	103	20	123	22	
Harry Hammond	England	FW	1891–1897	170	0	170	69	
Gary Hamson	England	MF	1976–1979	123	1	124	9	
Wally Hardinge	England	MF	1907–1913	154	0	154	46	
Barry Hartle	England	FW	1960–1966	117	0	117	21	
Bob Hatton	England	FW	1980–1982	114	4	118	43	
Derek Hawksworth	England	FW	1950–1958	286	0	286	103	
George Hedley	England	FW	1898–1903	155	0	155	39	
Ted Hemsley	England	DF	1968–1977	294	1	295	10	
Billy Hendry	Scotland	DF	1891–1895	121	0	121	3	
Colin Hill	Northern Ireland	MF	1989–1992	96	8	104	1	
Harry Hitchen	England	DF	1948–1953	172	0	172	15	
Glyn Hodges	Wales	MF	1991–1996	134	37	171	22	
Alan Hodgkinson	England	GK	1954–1971	674	0	674	0	
Billy Hodgson	Scotland	MF	1957–1963	183	0	183	37	
David Holdsworth	England	DF	1996–1999	118	0	118	7	
Jimmy Holmes	England	DF	1931–1936	146	0	146	1	
Harry Hooper	England	DF	1930–1946	300	0	300	12	
Stewart Houston	Scotland	DF	1980–1983	121	1	122	1	
Rab Howell	England	DF	1890–1908	240	0	240	11	
Charlie Howlett	England	GK	1889–1894	112	0	112	0	
Jamie Hoyland	England	MF	1990–1994	90	22	112	9	
Tommy Hoyland	England	DF	1949–1961	209	0	209	18	
Phil Jagielka	England	MF	1999–2007	264	23	287	22	
Harry Johnson Jr.	England	FW	1916–1931	351	0	351	252	
Howard Johnson	England	DF	1951–1957	107	0	107	1	
Tom Johnson	England	DF	1930–1941	212	0	212	0	
Harry Johnson Snr.	England	DF	1895–1908	275	0	275	7	
George Jones	England	MF	1936–1951	157	0	157	41	
Mick Jones	England	FW	1963–1967	172	0	172	76	
Pyotr Kachura	Belarus	FW	1996–2000	63	58	121	23	
Alan Kelly, Jr.	Republic of Ireland	GK	1992–1999	252	3	255	0	
Paddy Kenny	Republic of Ireland	GK	2002–2010	323	0	323	0	
Tony Kenworthy	England	MF	1976–1986	350	7	357	39	
Keith Kettleborough	England	FW	1960–1966	183	0	183	24	
Matthew Kilgallon	England	DF	2007–2010	122	2	124	4	
Seth King	England	DF	1939–1942	115	0	115	0	
Joseph Kitchen	England	FW	1908–1920; 1920–1921	271	0	271	11	
Rob Kozluk	England	DF	1999–2007; 2010–2011	219	27	246	3	
John Lang	Scotland	FW	1903–1909	105	0	105	13	
Harry Latham	England	DF	1940–1953	224	0	224	1	
Joe Lievesley	England	GK	1904–1912	288	0	288	0	
Bert Lipsham	England	MF	1900–1908	259	0	259	34	
John MacPhail	Scotland	DF	1979–1983	169	0	169	8	
Harry Maguire	England	DF	2011–2014	165	1	166	12	
Ken Mallender	England	DF	1962–1968	169	2	171	3	
Cliff Mason	England	DF	1955–1962	118	0	118	2	
John Matthews	England	MF	1978–1983	121	5	127	18	
Vincent Matthews	England	MF	1927–1931	141	0	141	3	
Reg Matthewson	England	DF	1962–1967	173	3	176	5	
David McGoldrick	Republic of Ireland	FW	2018–2022	127	27	136	30	
David Mercer	England	MF	1920–1928	250	0	250	22	
Ernest Milton	England	DF	1917–1926	228	0	228	4	
Nick Montgomery	Scotland	MF	2000–2012	319	80	399	11	
Chris Morgan	England	DF	2003–2012	275	7	282	16	
Colin Morris	England	FW	1982–1988	280	7	287	84	
David Munks	England	DF	1964–1969	124	5	129	2	
Shaun Murphy	Australia	DF	1999–2003	181	1	182	12	
Peter Ndlovu	Zimbabwe	FW	2001–2004	130	24	155	29	
Ernest Needham	England	DF	1891–1910	544	0	544	65	
Roger Nilsen	Norway	DF	1993–1999	177	13	190	0	
Jack O'Connell	England	DF	2016–2023	166	7	177	8	
Bert Oswald	Scotland	MF	1930–1934	115	0	115	24	
Bernard Oxley	England	FW	1928–1934	129	0	129	14	
Doc Pace	England	FW	1957–1965	301	0	301	175	
Rob Page	Wales	DF	2001–2004	127	1	128	1	
Harry Pantling	England	DF	1915–1926	255	0	255	1	
Bert Partridge	England	DF	1923–1929	103	0	103	22	
Paul Peschisolido	Canada	FW	2001 (loan); 2001–2004	45	57	102	24	
Jack Pickering	England	MF	1927–1948	398	0	398	119	
Martin Pike	England	DF	1986–1989	160	4	164	6	
Chris Porter	England	FW	2011–2015	66	47	113	23	
David Powell	Wales	DF	1968–1971	100	0	100	2	
Fred Priest	England	MF	1896–1905	248	0	248	86	
Alan Quinn	Republic of Ireland	MF	2004–2007	85	24	109	11	
Stephen Quinn	Republic of Ireland	MF	2005–2012	220	19	239	22	
Gil Reece	Wales	FW	1965–1972	225	16	241	67	
Brian Richardson	England	DF	1955–1965	336	0	336	9	
Alf Ringstead	Republic of Ireland	FW	1950–1959	271	0	271	109	
Paul Rogers	England	MF	1992–1995	166	6	139	11	
Billy Russell	England	MF	1957–1963	175	0	175	73	
Geoff Salmons	England	MF	1966–1974; 1977	207	12	213	10	
Tommy Sampy	England	MF	1921–1934	383	0	383	33	
Lee Sandford	England	DF	1996–2002	173	12	185	5	
Billy Sharp	England	FW	2004–2005; 2007–2010; 2015–2023	267	92	359	129	
Bernard Shaw	England	DF	1963–1969	161	1	162	3	
Graham Shaw	England	DF	1952–1967	497	0	497	15	
Joe Shaw	England	DF	1945–1966	713	0	713	8	
Jimmy Simmons	England	FW	1909–1920	223	0	223	49	
Steve Simonsen	England	GK	2010–2012	106	2	108	0	
Ron Simpson	England	MF	1958–1964	239	0	239	47	
Brian Smith	England	DF	1984–1989	103	6	109	0	
Jack Smith	England	GK	1931–1950	394	0	394	0	
Mick Speight	England	MF	1971–1980	223	18	241	17	
Enda Stevens	Republic of Ireland	DF	2017–2023	196	6	202	9	
Albert Sturgess	England	DF	1908–1923	382	0	382	5	
Gerry Summers	England	DF	1957–1964	305	0	305	7	
Gareth Taylor	Wales	FW	1996–1998	70	35	105	27	
Harry Thickett	England	DF	1891; 1893–1904	310	0	310	1	
Dennis Thompson	England	MF	1941–1951	108	0	108	24	
Percy Thorpe	England	DF	1930–1933	114	0	114	24	
Les Tibbott	Wales	MF	1979–1981	100	3	103	3	
Michael Tonge	England	MF	2001–2008	269	33	302	24	
Simon Tracey	England	GK	1988–2002	380	3	383	0	
Mike Trusson	England	MF	1980–1983	155	1	156	32	
Fred Tunstall	England	FW	1920–1932	491	0	491	135	
George Utley	England	MF	1913–1922	122	0	122	9	
Barry Wagstaff	England	MF	1964–1969	126	12	138	5	
Tony Wagstaff	England	FW	1961–1969	164	3	164	23	
Mitch Ward	England	MF	1989–1997	157	25	182	16	
Arthur Watson	England	MF	1890–1896	127	0	127	43	
Jimmy Waugh	England	DF	1921–1926	143	0	143	3	
Keith Waugh	England	GK	1981–1984	121	0	121	0	
Danny Webber	England	FW	2005–2009	80	45	125	25	
Dane Whitehouse	England	MF	1988–1997	246	32	246	51	
Michael Whitham	England	DF	1890–1897	160	0	160	1	
Chris Wilder	England	DF	1986–1992; 1998	123	9	132	1	
Bernard Wilkinson	England	DF	1900–1913	397	0	397	14	
Charlie Wilkinson	England	DF	1933–1938	133	0	133	0	
Bertie Williams	Wales	FW	1932–1937	125	0	125	18	
Curtis Woodhouse	England	MF	1997–2001	107	15	122	6	
Alan Woodward	England	FW	1964–1978	640	0	640	193	

== Club captains ==
Dates	Captain
1889–1890	(England) Jack Hudson
1890–1892	(England) George Groves
1892–1894	(Scotland) Billy Hendry
1894–1914	Unknown
1914–1916	(England) George Utley
1916–1992	(England) Tony Kenworthy
1992–1996	(England) Brian Gayle
1996–2001	Unknown
2001–2002	(England) Keith Curle
2002–2004	(Wales) Rob Page
2004–2005	Unknown
2005–2012	(England) Chris Morgan
2012–2015	(Republic of Ireland) Michael Doyle
2015–2023	(England) Billy Sharp
2023–2024	(Republic of Ireland) John Egan
2024–2025	(England) Jack Robinson
2025–present	(England) Japhet Tanganga

== See also ==
- List of Sheffield United F.C. players (25–99 appearances)
