= 1924–25 Cardiff City F.C. season =

Welsh football club season

Cardiff City
1924–25 season
- Chairman: Dr William Nicholson
- Manager: Fred Stewart
- Division One: 11th
- FA Cup: Runner-up
- Welsh Cup: Fifth round
- Top goalscorer: League: Len Davies (20); All: Len Davies (22)
- Highest home attendance: 35,000 (v Sheffield United, 1 September 1924)
- Lowest home attendance: 8,000 (v Burnley, 11 February 1925)
- Average home league attendance: 21,238
Home colours

The 1924–25 season was the 24th season of competitive football played by Cardiff City F.C. and the team's fourth consecutive season in the First Division of the Football League. During the previous campaign the club had finished as runners up in the First Division, losing the title on the final day of the season via goal average. However, they were unable to repeat their form and endured a disappointing season, finishing in 11th place.

In cup competitions, Cardiff enjoyed considerably more success, becoming the first Welsh club to reach the final of the FA Cup in the tournament's 50-year history. Cardiff needed two replays to overcome Third Division side Darlington in the first round. Fulham and Notts County were dispatched in rounds two and three respectively before Cardiff met Leicester City in the fourth round. With the tie set for a replay, Wiilie Davies scored directly from a corner-kick with the final act of the match to win the tie for Cardiff. After defeating Blackburn Rovers in the semifinal, the side reached their first ever FA Cup final where they met Sheffield United, suffering a 1–0 defeat. In the Welsh Cup, Cardiff entered the competition in the fifth round where they were eliminated by Swansea Town.

Goalkeeper Tom Farquharson and defender Jimmy Nelson made more appearances than any other players during the season, each featuring in 46 matches across all competitions. For the fourth consecutive season, Len Davies was the club's top goalscorer, scoring 22 times in all competitions.

== Background ==
Cardiff City joined the Football League in 1920 after being elected into the Second Division. The side won promotion in its first season after finishing as runner-up to Birmingham, reaching the First Division. During the 1923–24 season the club finished second in the First Division despite leading the table for the majority of the campaign. Cardiff had entered the final day of the season top of the table and needed to beat Birmingham to secure the title but could only manage a goalless draw, during which top scorer Len Davies saw a penalty saved. Second placed Huddersfield Town secured a 3–0 victory over Nottingham Forest to overtake Cardiff and claim the league title on goal average. The margin of victory, 0.024 of a goal, remains the closest finish to a First Division title race in the history of the top tier of English football.

At the end of the campaign Cardiff embarked on its first overseas tour, playing matches in Czechoslovakia, Austria and Germany. The first match was a bad-tempered affair against Czech side AC Sparta Prague as Cardiff players were kicked and punched by spectators as they attempted to take corner kicks and throw-ins. The opposition were also accused of overly physical play by the Cardiff players during a 3–2 victory for the Czechs. A second match against the same opponents saw Cardiff win by the same scoreline before the team continued their tour by beating Austrian side First Vienna 2–0 in front of an estimated crowd of 60–70,000 people. The tour concluded with matches against German sides Borussia Dortmund and Hamburger SV. Cardiff defeated Dortmund 2–0 before being held to a 2–2 draw by Hamburger SV.

Although the side ultimately missed out on the league title, their second-placed finish saw ticket sales increase greatly ahead of the new season with both the Grange and Canton stands being sold out and the rest of the ground largely full. Manager Fred Stewart, who was entering his tenth competitive season in charge, made several changes to his playing squad with ten players being signed. Harry Beadles had arrived at the club from Liverpool immediately following the end of the previous season and had been part of the club's overseas tour. He had previously had a trial at the club after the First World War which had proved unsuccessful. Several players from local teams were also brought in, including forwards Jack Nicholls, son of Cardiff director Sydney Nicholls who was signed from Newport County, and Willie Davies, signed from Swansea Town for £2,500. The club also signed Joe Nicholson from Clapton Orient and Tom Sloan from Linfield, as well as James McLean from amateur side Barn Athletic, a player who was regarded as deaf and dumb although he never played for the first team.

The pitch at the club's home ground, Ninian Park, was overhauled with several tons of sand, soil and grass seeds lain ahead of the campaign after criticism of the playing surface. In the early stages of the season, Cardiff hired noted seed experts Sutton & Co to advise on ways of improving the playing surface.

== First Division ==
Cardiff started the season with a goalless draw away to Burnley on 30 August 1924 and a 1–1 draw with Sheffield United two days later. Cardiff were one of several to begin the season slowly, including FA Cup holders Newcastle United, with The Times reporting that the expectant teams' "preconceived ideas have been rudely shaken". The previous four season's top goalscorer Len Davies, who had scored Cardiff's first goal of the season against Sheffield, added a brace to provide his side with their first victory in the following fixture, defeating newly promoted Leeds United 3–1; Denis Lawson added a third with all three goals scored in the second half. However, two successive defeats followed, 1–0 in the reverse fixture against Sheffield United and 2–1 against Birmingham, that left the side in 14th position after winning only one of their opening five fixtures. The Times stated that the side had started the season in "unpromising style" and attributed the downturn in fortunes to a "flaw in the link between the forwards and the half-backs". The newspaper did however predict that "better results are now likely to be achieved." The team's poor start was partly attributed to a series of injuries and illness that saw Len Davies, Jack Evans, Jimmy Nelson and Harry Wake miss several matches.

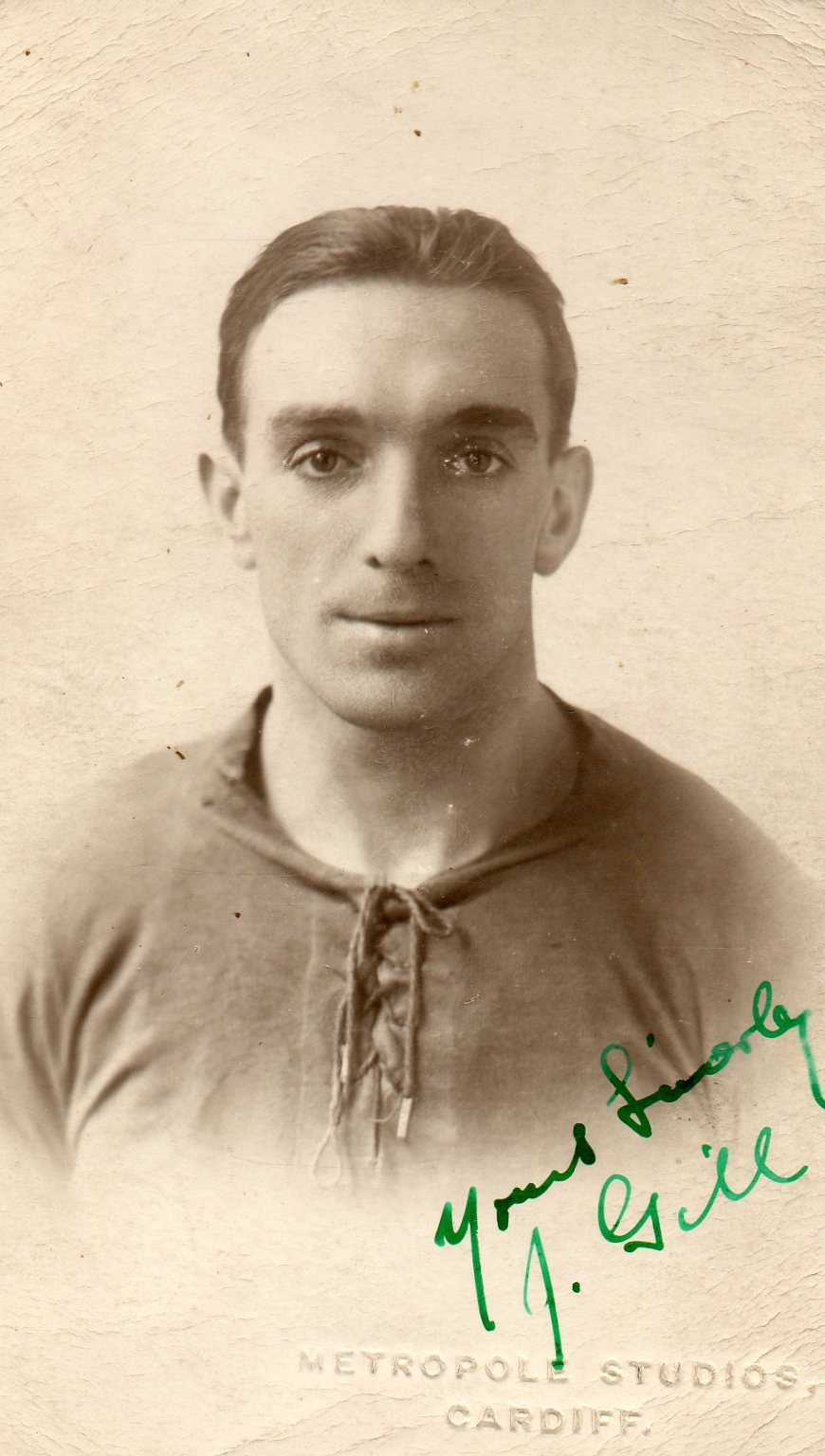
Jimmy Gill was one of three players to score ten or more goals during the season.

Forward trio Len Davies, Jimmy Gill and Joe Clennell all scored in a 3–1 victory over Preston North End on 15 September but another injury to Davies forced him out of the side. His injury proved costly as he missed the following three matches in which Cardiff suffered home defeats to West Bromwich Albion and Bolton Wanderers and drew 1–1 against Tottenham Hotspur at White Hart Lane in a match they were regarded as being fortunate to gain a point. New signing Paddy McIlvenny deputised in Davies' absence and, although he scored his first goal for the club to gain a point against Tottenham, he was noted in The Times as not being able "to hold the front line together." Some of his more experienced teammates were also heavily criticised after drawing with Tottenham, with the publication commenting "Some of the older members of the team appeared to have lost much of their fire and zeal". Davies returned in a 3–0 defeat to Notts County on 11 October although he was one of several players who wasted chances during the match. However, his return brought an upsurge in form and he enjoyed a prolific spell in front of goal, scoring braces in consecutive 2–1 victories over Everton and Newcastle United. The team's following tie against Liverpool was postponed after heavy rainfall left the pitch at Ninian Park flooded. On 8 November, Cardiff suffered a 2–1 defeat against Nottingham Forest despite Harry Beadles scoring his first goal for the club after only two minutes. Beadles struck up an effective partnership with Len Davies, having displaced long-serving Joe Clennell from the starting line-up, and the pair both scored a brace during a 4–1 victory over Bury a week later. The pair combined again in the team's following match against Manchester City, both putting Cardiff a goal ahead before Frank Roberts equalised after each goal as the match ended 2–2.

After a 1–1 draw with Arsenal at the end of November, Cardiff began December by defeating Aston Villa with another brace from Len Davies before drawing 2–2 with reigning First Division champions Huddersfield Town. The side's previously postponed fixture against Liverpool was played two days later and ended the club's five match unbeaten streak as they suffered a 3–1 defeat. Jimmy Gill was left out of the club's following match, a 3–1 defeat to Blackburn Rovers after a disagreement with the side that saw him placed on the transfer list. He resolved the issue in time to be named in the side that suffered a 3–2 defeat to West Ham United on Christmas Day, a third straight loss. In the reverse fixture against West Ham on Boxing Day, Cardiff secured a 2–1 victory in what became the team's final match before the New Year after their fixture against Burnley, originally scheduled for 28 December, was postponed due to a waterlogged pitch, leaving Cardiff in 15th place.

Cardiff began January with a 1–0 defeat away to Sunderland on New Year's Day and a goalless draw with Leeds two days later. Len Davies' goal provided brief respite for the side in a 1–0 victory over Birmingham before Cardiff failed to score in their following two matches, defeats to league leaders West Bromwich Albion and Bolton Wanderers. The team ended their goal drought with an emphatic 4–0 victory over Burnley in the rearranged fixture originally scheduled for 28 December. A brace from Len Davies, a penalty by Jimmy Nelson and one from Gill secured victory in front of a relatively small home crowd of 8,000. International call-ups weakened the squad for the visit of Notts County with five first team players being chosen to play in a Scotland vs Wales fixture. Nevertheless, Cardiff held their higher ranked opponents to a 1–1 draw with wing-half Joe Nicholson, who was deputising as a striker in the absence of Len Davies, scoring his side's goal. A 2–1 victory over Everton on 25 February was followed three days later by a 3–0 victory over Newcastle United in which Nicholson, still filling in as a forward, scored a brace.

A two-week break due to FA Cup commitments meant Cardiff's next match was on 14 March against Nottingham Forest. A penalty from Nelson and a goal by Gill secured a third consecutive victory for the side. Cardiff suffered a 2–0 defeat to Tottenham Hotspur on 18 March and, with their FA Cup semifinal to be played soon after, several first team regulars were rested for a match against Bury the week before and replaced by fringe players, including Jack Lewis who made his only appearance of the season. The weakened side ultimately fell to a heavy 4–1 defeat. A further defeat to Manchester City extended the run of defeats to three before a 1–1 draw with Arsenal ended the run. The Times remarked that reaching the final of the FA Cup appeared to have distracted the side, stating "the edge was off the game early in the match" and noted the lack of celebration for Beadles' equalising goal. Results did improve for the side soon after and, despite injury concerns and international call-ups, they recorded consecutive home victories over Aston Villa, Sunderland and Blackburn Rovers. After a goalless draw with league leaders Huddersfield Town, Cardiff ended its season by beating Liverpool 2–1, with goals from Beadles and Gill, and drawing 0–0 with relegated Preston North End. The side finished the campaign in 11th place.

=== Partial league table ===
Pos	Team	Pld	W	D	L	GF	GA	GAv	Pts
9	Notts County	42	16	13	13	42	31	1.355	45
10	Manchester City	42	17	9	16	76	68	1.118	43
11	Cardiff City	42	16	11	15	56	51	1.098	43
12	Tottenham Hotspur	42	15	12	15	52	43	1.209	42
13	West Ham United	42	15	12	15	62	60	1.033	42

Rules for classification: 1) Points; 2) Goal average; 3) Goals scored

=== Match results ===
Key

- In result column, Cardiff City's score shown first
- H = Home match
- A = Away match
- pen. = Penalty kick
- o.g. = Own goal

Results

Date	Opponents	Result	Goalscorers	Attendance
30 August 1924	Burnley (A)	0–0		17,000
1 September 1924	Sheffield United (H)	1–1	L. Davies	35,000
6 September 1924	Leeds United (H)	3–0	L. Davies (2), Lawson	30,000
8 September 1924	Sheffield United (A)	0–1		22,000
13 September 1924	Birmingham (A)	1–2	Gill	20,000
15 September 1924	Preston North End (A)	3–1	L. Davies, Gill, Clennell	12,000
20 September 1924	West Bromwich Albion (H)	0–1		20,000
27 September 1924	Tottenham Hotspur (A)	1–1	McIlvenny	40,000
4 October 1924	Bolton Wanderers (H)	1–2	W. Davies	30,000
11 October 1924	Notts County (A)	0–3		20,000
18 October 1924	Everton (H)	2–1	L. Davies (2)	20,000
25 October 1924	Newcastle United (A)	2–1	L. Davies (2)	20,000
8 November 1924	Nottingham Forest (H)	1–2	Beadles	10,000
15 November 1924	Bury (H)	4–1	Beadles (2), L. Davies (2)	20,000
22 November 1924	Manchester City (A)	2–2	Beadles, L. Davies	15,000
29 November 1924	Arsenal (H)	1–1	Beadles	20,000
6 December 1924	Aston Villa (A)	2–1	L. Davies (2)	30,000
13 December 1924	Huddersfield Town (H)	2–2	W. Davies, Beadles	25,000
15 December 1924	Liverpool (H)	1–3	Gill	17,000
20 December 1924	Blackburn Rovers (A)	1–3	Beadles	20,000
25 December 1924	West Ham United (A)	2–3	W. Davies, Beadles	27,000
26 December 1924	West Ham United (H)	2–1	Beadles, L. Davies	31,000
1 January 1925	Sunderland (A)	0–1		18,000
3 January 1925	Leeds United (A)	0–0		13,000
17 January 1925	Birmingham (H)	1–0	L. Davies	16,000
24 January 1925	West Bromwich Albion (A)	0–1		20,000
7 February 1925	Bolton Wanderers (A)	0–3		17,374
11 February 1925	Burnley (H)	4–0	Nelson (p), L. Davies (2), Gill	8,000
14 February 1925	Notts County (H)	1–1	Nicholson	20,000
25 February 1925	Everton (A)	2–1	Beadles, W. Davies	8,000
28 February 1925	Newcastle United (H)	3–0	Nicholson, McIlvenny	25,000
14 March 1925	Nottingham Forest (H)	2–0	Nelson (p), Gill	15,000
18 March 1925	Tottenham Hotspur (H)	0–2		27,000
27 March 1925	Bury (A)	1–4	Nicholson	20,000
1 April 1925	Manchester City (H)	0–2		15,000
4 April 1925	Arsenal (A)	1–1	Beadles	25,000
11 April 1925	Aston Villa (H)	2–1	Nicholson, Gill	18,000
13 April 1925	Sunderland (H)	2–0	L. Davies (2)	18,000
15 April 1925	Blackburn Rovers (H)	3–0	Gill, W. Davies, Nicholson	12,000
18 April 1925	Huddersfield Town (A)	0–0		16,000
29 April 1925	Liverpool (A)	2–1	Beadles, Gill	20,000
2 May 1925	Preston North End (H)	0–0		17,000

== Cup matches ==
=== FA Cup ===
Cardiff entered the FA Cup in the first round and were drawn against Third Division North side Darlington. Despite being considered heavy favourites, Cardiff could only manage a goalless draw in a result that was regarded as one of the surprise results of the round, with the home side being jeered off the pitch by their own supporters. The result was partly blamed on the substandard condition of the pitch at Cardiff's Ninian Park ground, with the surface being noted for its "deadness that made accurate passing impossible". The two teams met in a replay four days later where the pitch at Darlington's home ground, Feethams, also drew criticism with Cardiff players being quoted as saying the pitch was "worse than Ninian Park had ever been". The teams played out a second goalless draw necessitating a second replay, held at Anfield in Liverpool. Their lower ranked opponents created several scoring opportunities in the opening stages of the match but were unable to convert any, hitting the crossbar twice. Early in the second half, Cardiff took the lead when Beadles' shot rebounded off the crossbar allowing Len Davies to open the scoring. Willie Davies added a second later in the half as the match finished 2–0.

In the second round, Cardiff were drawn against Fulham. The match was played in difficult conditions with The Times stating that the heavy rainfall meant that "good football was out of the question". The rapidly deteriorating pitch led the referee to halt the game for ten minutes before both sides agreed to continue play with Len Davies scoring the only goal of the match. Fellow First Division side Notts County were Cardiff's opponents in the third round, with County considered favourites for the tie. With Len Davies injured, his replacement Joe Nicholson opened the scoring before Jimmy Gill scored a second. Gill's goal received particular praise and was described as "the finest exhibition of artistry ever seen. With the ball at his feet, he evaded opponent after opponent, all after him like terriers and when he placed the ball in the net he gave Iremonger no chance."

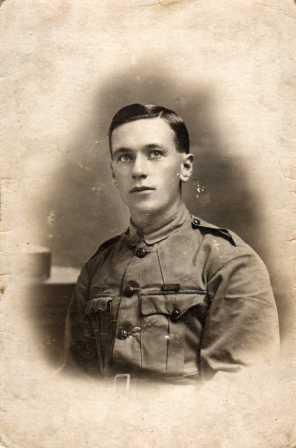
Harry Beadles scored twice during Cardiff's FA Cup run.

In the fourth round, Cardiff were drawn against Second Division side Leicester City, the second meeting between the two sides in the FA Cup in three seasons; Cardiff had eliminated Leicester in the second round during the 1922–23 season. More than 50,000 spectators attended the fixture and Leicester enjoyed the better play of the first half but it was Cardiff who took the lead early in the second half when Beadles headed in from Willie Davies' cross. Leicester quickly equalised when Arthur Chandler's shot was parried by Cardiff goalkeeper Tom Farquharson, allowing Johnny Duncan to lift the ball over the stricken keeper and into the net. In the final moments of the game, Leicester defender Adam Black cleared the ball out for an opposition corner after being pressured in possession. Willie Davies took the corner for Cardiff, sending the ball into the box where it looped over the head of the opposition goalkeeper and into the net. The Times match report described the goal, writing "As it came across it seemed to hang in the wind and then took a quick swerve, curling into the farther corner of the net." The referee immediately blew his whistle for both the goal and the end of the match. As the rule stopping a player to score directly from a corner kick had only been lifted the previous year, there was initially confusion in the ground as to whether the goal stood before some Cardiff fans invaded the pitch and engulfed Willie Davies in celebration. He later recalled his goal and the moments after, remarking "I took it in a hurry with my right foot. The swerve on the ball beat everybody and it went straight into the net! I had forgotten, in the excitement, that a goal could now be scored direct from the corner-flag, but the next minute I was being mobbed by thousands of spectators." Despite some celebrations, there were still large parts of the crowd who were unsure whether the goal stood and the overall outcome of the match. Cardiff captain Jimmy Blair and Willie Davies had to return to the pitch from the dressing room to make an announcement to the waiting crowd that the goal stood and Cardiff had subsequently progressed.

The team's victory over Leicester saw them reach the semifinal of the FA Cup for the second time in five seasons where they were drawn against fellow First Division side Blackburn Rovers. With semifinal ties traditionally played at a neutral venue, the match was held at Meadow Lane, the home ground of Notts County, attracting a relatively low crowd of 20,000. Cardiff made a last minute change when Len Davies was replaced by Nicholson in the starting line-up and it was Nicholson who opened the scoring after just six minutes when he headed in after a goalmouth scramble from a corner. Gill and Beadles added two further goals after mistakes in the Blackburn defence to give their side an unassailable lead. Blackburn scored a late consolation goal through John McKay but were unable to breach the Cardiff defence again despite sustained pressure. By defeating Blackburn, Cardiff became the first Welsh club to reach an FA Cup final and the first non-English team to do so since Scottish side Queens Park in 1885. Despite recovering from injury, Len Davies was left out of the side with Nicholson keeping his place. Around 92,000 spectators attended the final against Sheffield United at Wembley Stadium with the match dubbed "The Jubilee Final" as the 50th final in the competition's history. The match was deemed to be low on quality with The Times reporting that more than two-thirds of the final were "never first-class." The decisive moment of the match came on the half hour mark when Cardiff half-back Harry Wake gave possession away cheaply to opposition forward Fred Tunstall who scored the only goal of the game. Fred Keenor later described the build up to the winning goal, commenting "Wake was in possession of the ball and was facing his own goal when he turned to make a clearance. Tunstall, sizing up the position much quicker than any of our defence, raced in, robbed Wake on the turn, and after advancing about 10 yards shot into the corner of the net." Keenor though absolved his teammate of any blame in conceding the goal, adding "Any blame must be shouldered by the rest of the defence, of which I was one. A warning shout should have been given of Tunstall's first approach."

==== Match results ====
Key

- In result column, Cardiff City's score shown first
- H = Home match
- A = Away match
- N = Neutral venue
- pen. = Penalty kick
- o.g. = Own goal

Results

Date	Round	Opponents	Result	Goalscorers	Attendance
10 January 1925	First	Darlington (H)	0–0		21,150
14 January 1925	First (replay)	Darlington (A)	0–0		18,808
18 January 1925	First (replay)	Darlington (N)	2–0	W. Davies, L. Davies	22,465
31 January 1925	Second	Fulham (H)	1–0	L. Davies	20,000
21 February 1925	Third	Notts County (A)	2–0	Nicholson, Gill	39,000
7 March 1925	Fourth	Leicester City (H)	2–1	W. Davies, Beadles	50,272
28 March 1925	Semi-final	Blackburn Rovers (N)	3–1	Nicholson, Gill, Beadles	20,000
25 April 1925	Final	Sheffield United (N)	0–1		91,763

=== Welsh Cup ===
Cardiff entered the Welsh Cup in the fifth round, being drawn against South Wales rivals Swansea Town. Manager Fred Stewart chose to rest several first team players for the match and they went on to suffer a 4–0 defeat.

==== Match results ====
Key

- In result column, Cardiff City's score shown first
- H = Home match
- A = Away match
- pen. = Penalty kick
- o.g. = Own goal

Results

Date	Round	Opponents	Result	Goalscorers	Attendance
3 March 1925	Fifth	Swansea Town (A)	0–4		15,000

== Player details ==
During the season, manager Fred Stewart used 24 players in all competitions. Goalkeeper Tom Farquharson and defender Jimmy Nelson made the most appearances of any players, both featuring in 46 matches during the campaign. Five other players made 40 or more appearances. Elvet Collins, Jack Lewis, Billy Taylor and George Whitcombe all made a single appearance during the season. Lewis and Whitcombe's appearances were their final matches for Cardiff before being released.

Ten players scored at least one goal for the club during the course of the season. Len Davies finished the campaign as the club's top goalscorer for the fourth consecutive season, netting 22 times in all competitions despite featuring in only five of the club's final 19 matches due to injury problems. Harry Beadles was the second-highest scorer in his debut season for the club, scoring 14 times. Jimmy Gill was the only other player to reach double figures, with 11 goals.

=== Player statistics ===
Player	Position	First Division		FA Cup		Welsh Cup		Total	
Player	Position	Apps	Goals	Apps	Goals	Apps	Goals	Apps	Goals
Harry Beadles	FW	25	12	8	2	1	0	34	14
Jimmy Blair	DF	36	0	7	0	0	0	43	0
Joe Clennell	FW	12	1	0	0	0	0	12	1
Elvet Collins	FW	1	0	0	0	0	0	1	0
Len Davies	FW	30	20	4	2	p	0	34	22
Willie Davies	FW	31	5	7	2	1	0	39	7
Jack Evans	FW	33	0	6	0	1	0	40	0
Tom Farquharson	GK	37	0	8	0	1	0	46	0
Jimmy Gill	FW	32	9	6	2	0	0	38	11
Alfie Hagan	FW	3	1	0	0	0	0	3	1
Billy Hardy	HB	36	0	8	0	0	0	44	0
Joe Hills	GK	5	0	0	0	0	0	5	0
Fred Keenor	DF	36	0	8	0	0	0	44	0
Denis Lawson	FW	26	1	5	0	1	0	32	1
Jack Lewis	FW	1	0	0	0	0	0	1	0
Paddy McIlvenny	FW	5	2	0	0	0	0	5	2
Jimmy Nelson	DF	37	2	8	0	1	0	46	2
Jack Nicholls	FW	2	0	0	0	0	0	2	0
Joe Nicholson	HB/FW	29	6	5	2	1	0	35	8
Jack Page	DF	9	0	0	0	1	0	10	0
Tom Sloan	DF	4	0	0	0	1	0	5	0
Billy Taylor	HB	1	0	0	0	0	0	1	0
Harry Wake	HB	31	0	8	0	1	0	40	0
George Whitcombe	HB	0	0	0	0	1	0	1	0

FW = Forward, HB = Halfback, GK = Goalkeeper, DF = Defender

== Aftermath ==
Despite losing the final, Fred Keenor remained upbeat on the strength of the team and stated after the match "Just because we lost in our very first cup final, I don't think there is any cause to get down in the mouth. I can say here and now that one day soon our followers can be sure that Cardiff City will bring that Cup to Wales." The team returned to Cardiff where, despite their defeat, they received a "rapturous welcome" and attended a dinner at City Hall with the mayor of the city. Keenor's prediction would be proven right two years later in the 1927 FA Cup Final when he captained the side to victory to become the only non-English team to win the FA Cup in the competition's history.

The Cup final appearance raised hopes that the club could win a trophy the following season but a change to the offside rule during the off-season, reducing the number of players required between an attacker and the net, proved difficult to adapt to for Cardiff's defence and they finished in 16th place. The disappointing start to the season led Fred Stewart to revamp the playing squad, including selling long-serving forward Jimmy Gill to Blackpool for £3,200 in the opening months of the campaign.
