= Tinnion =

Tinnion is a surname. Notable people with the surname include:

- Brian Tinnion (born 1968), English footballer and manager
- Brian Tinnion (footballer, born 1948), English footballer and manager
- Jim Tinnion (1904–1977), English footballer
