= 1925 FA Cup final =

Association football match between Sheffield United and Cardiff

1925 FA Cup Final
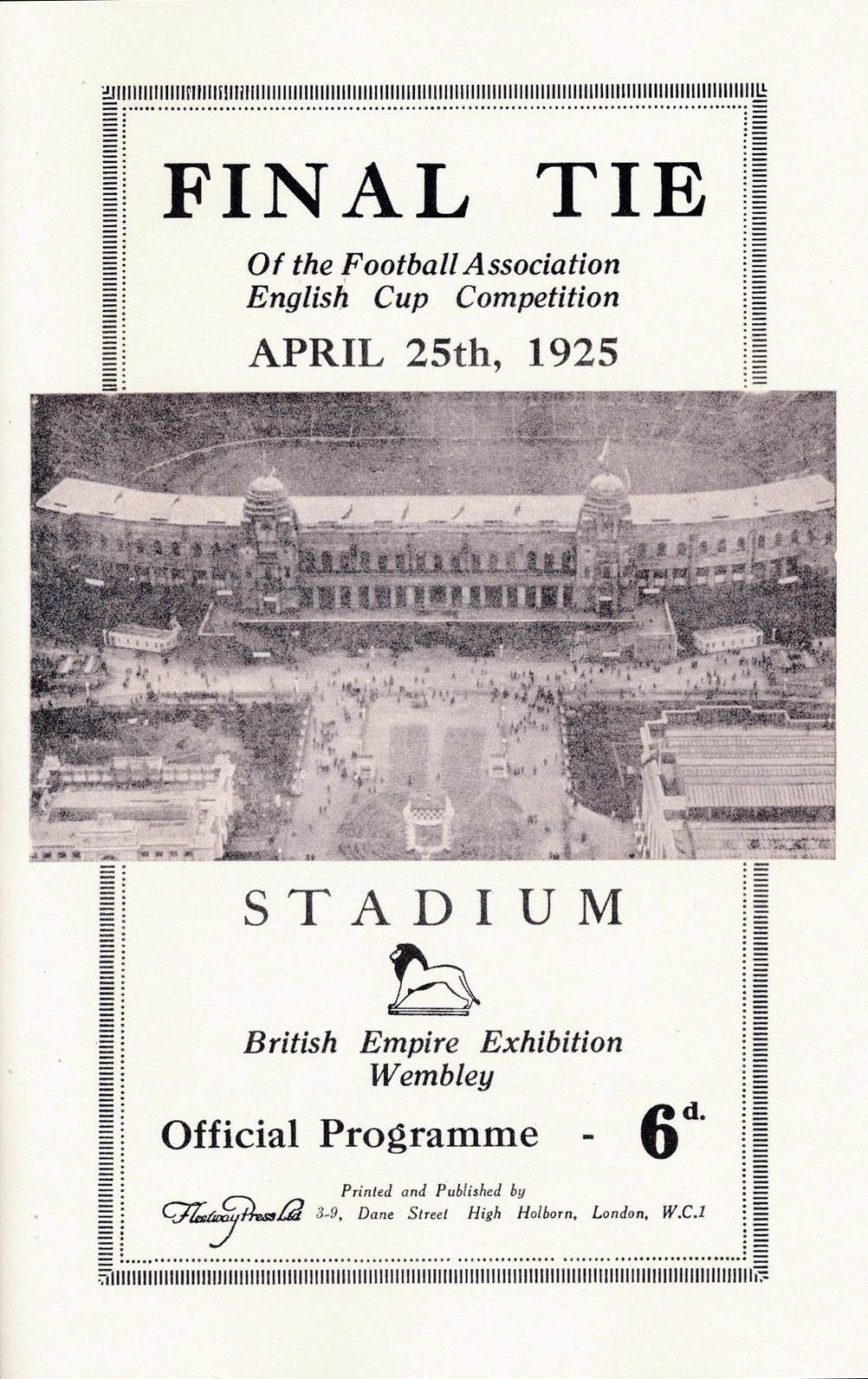
- Official programme
- Event: 1924–25 FA Cup
Sheffield United	Cardiff City
1	0
- Date: 25 April 1925
- Venue: Wembley Stadium, London
- Referee: G. N. Watson (Nottinghamshire)
- Attendance: 91,763

The 1925 FA Cup final was an association football match contested by Sheffield United and Cardiff City on 25 April 1925 at Wembley Stadium in London, England. The final was the showpiece match of English football's primary cup competition, the Football Association Challenge Cup (FA Cup), organised by the Football Association. Sheffield United won the game with a single goal.

Both teams entered the competition in the first round and progressed through five stages to reach the final. Sheffield United conceded only two goals en route to the final, both in a 3–2 victory over their local rivals The Wednesday in the second round. Cardiff also conceded twice before the final, once in the fourth round and once in the semi-final. They struggled to overcome Third Division North side Darlington in the first round, needing two replays to progress. This was the first time a Welsh team had played in an FA Cup final, and only the third time a team from outside England had reached a final. The Scottish side Queen's Park played in the 1884 and 1885 finals.

Nearly 92,000 spectators attended the game. The only goal of the contest was scored by Sheffield United's Fred Tunstall after 30 minutes when he dispossessed Harry Wake on the edge of the Cardiff penalty area before shooting past goalkeeper Tom Farquharson. Cardiff were unable to respond and the match finished 1–0, giving Sheffield United their fourth FA Cup triumph. The match remains the last time Sheffield United have won the competition. Cardiff returned to Wembley two years later, in the 1927 final, when they won the trophy for the first time.

== Route to the final ==
The FA Cup is English football's primary cup competition and is organised by the Football Association (FA). If a match ends in a draw, a replay comes into force, ordinarily at the ground of the team who were drawn away for the first match. Although the competition primarily contains teams from England, Welsh teams have been allowed entry since 1876. A motion had been put forward in the early 1920s to bar Welsh clubs from competing in the FA Cup. Although this idea was rejected, the number of teams from Wales allowed to enter was limited to 14 with the FA having the final say on selection. Cardiff City had joined the Football League in 1920 and quickly established themselves as one of the leading clubs in the competition.

=== Sheffield United ===
Sheffield United route to the final
Round	Opposition	Score
1st	Corinthian (h)	5–0
2nd	The Wednesday (h)	3–2
3rd	Everton (h)	1–0
4th	West Bromwich Albion (h)	2–0
Semi-final	Southampton (n)	2–0

Four goals by Harry Johnson and one by Tommy Boyle helped First Division side Sheffield United defeat amateur side Corinthian 5–0 in the first round of the 1924–25 FA Cup, in front of a home crowd of 38,167 at Bramall Lane. This set up a second round tie against local rivals The Wednesday in a match that was preceded by torrential rain. Nevertheless, both teams attacked from the offset and The Wednesday took a two-goal lead in the opening ten minutes, the only goals United would concede en route to the final. United rallied and, after wasting several chances, goals from Tommy Sampy and George Green drew them level before half-time. Another goal by Sampy early in the second half gave United a 3–2 win.

United were given another home tie in the third round where a single goal by Fred Tunstall was enough to give them a win over Everton in what was, at the time, a record attendance at Bramall Lane of 51,745. This figure was surpassed in the fourth round as 57,197 watched goals by Tunstall and Johnson give United a 2–0 home win against West Bromwich Albion.

For United's next match they travelled to a neutral venue, Stamford Bridge in London, to face Second Division side Southampton. It was United's seventh appearance in the semi-final of the competition (and 100th cup tie overall) and nearly 70,000 fans attended the tie. An own goal late in the first half gave United the lead. After the break Southampton had a chance to draw level when Harry Pantling fouled Bill Rawlings in the penalty area. The resulting penalty was taken by Tom Parker but his shot was saved by Charles Sutcliffe. The penalty proved to be Southampton's only major opportunity in the match as they rarely troubled the opposition defence. Soon after the missed penalty, United added a second goal from Tunstall who broke through the defence to make it 2–0 and secure his side a place in the final.

=== Cardiff City ===
Cardiff City route to the final
Round	Opposition	Score
1st	Darlington (h)	0–0
1st	Darlington (a)	0–0
1st	Darlington (n)	2–0
2nd	Fulham (h)	1–0
3rd	Notts County (a)	2–0
4th	Leicester City (h)	2–1
Semi-final	Blackburn Rovers (n)	3–1

Cardiff City, also of the First Division, entered the FA Cup as one of the joint favourites to win the competition, alongside Aston Villa and reigning First Division champions Huddersfield Town. In the first round of the cup they were drawn against Third Division North leaders Darlington. The first tie at Cardiff's ground, Ninian Park, ended in a goalless draw with the poor state of the pitch being blamed for a lack of excitement in the game. A replay at Darlington's Feethams ground drew a record crowd of more than 18,000 people for the club but again ended goalless. A third match was arranged at a neutral venue, Anfield in Liverpool, where Cardiff finally overcame their lower ranked opponents in front of more than 22,000 spectators. Second-half goals from Len Davies and Willie Davies secured a 2–0 win and set up a home tie against Fulham. Cardiff's second round match was played in a heavy downpour that caused play to be suspended for ten minutes. A Len Davies goal late in the first half was enough to give Cardiff a 1–0 win.

Cardiff travelled to Meadow Lane for their third round tie against Notts County which they won 2–0 with goals from Joe Nicholson, who replaced the injured Len Davies in the starting lineup, and Jimmy Gill. Gill's goal drew considerable praise, Cardiff's match reporter writing: "The goal by Gill was the finest exhibition of artistry ever seen ... he eluded opponent after opponent, all after him like terriers and, when he placed the ball in the net, he gave Albert Iremonger no chance."

Cardiff hosted Leicester City in the fourth round where after a goalless first half Harry Beadles gave Cardiff the lead, only for Johnny Duncan to level the score. In the final minute, Willie Davies scored directly from a corner to send Cardiff through with a 2–1 win. This was the first season in English football that a new law allowed players to score direct from a corner kick. Davies was mobbed by supporters following the goal, but there remained confusion among other members of the crowd and Davies, along with teammate Jimmy Blair, was forced to return to the field from the dressing room after the match to confirm to the crowd that Cardiff had won the tie.

The semi-final saw Cardiff return to Meadow Lane as a neutral venue for their match with five-time winners Blackburn Rovers, who were appearing in their twelfth semi-final. A close match had been predicted as both sides were similarly placed in the First Division table at the time, but early goals from Nicholson, Gill and Willie Davies gave Cardiff a 3–0 lead at half-time. John McKay replied for Blackburn with a headed goal after the break but the game finished 3–1 to Cardiff. By winning the match, Cardiff became the first Welsh team to reach an FA Cup final.

== Match ==
=== Pre-match ===
Ahead of the game, much of the focus of the national media centred on the idea of the FA Cup being won by a team from outside England for the first time. The only team based outside England to reach the final before this match was Scottish side Queen's Park who were defeated 2–0 by Blackburn Rovers in the 1885 final. Before the 1925 final, Cardiff's best finish in the FA Cup had been as semi-finalists in the 1920–21 season. Sheffield United were appearing in their fifth final: they had won the competition in 1899, 1902 and 1915 and had been defeated in the 1901 final. Cardiff went into the match placed 13th in the First Division, two points ahead of United; their opponents held the advantage in the two league meetings between the sides, having drawn 1–1 at Ninian Park before winning the second fixture 1–0.

In its pre-match coverage, The Times reported that Cardiff's strength would lie in the team's defensive capabilities and noted that the team relied on the "soundness of the defence". Fred Keenor in particular was described as having "dominated every tie" leading up to the final, while fellow defenders Billy Hardy, Jimmy Blair and Jimmy Nelson and goalkeeper Tom Farquharson were also picked out as key to the team's success. Cardiff's forwards were deemed to be the weaker of the two sides. Largely due to his physical prowess, Joe Nicholson, a half back who had converted to playing as a forward during the campaign, was expected to start ahead of top scorer Len Davies who had recovered from injury. Nicholson had been in doubt ahead of the tie after injuring himself in the aftermath of Cardiff's semi-final victory over Blackburn. While attempting to escape from a throng of excited fans outside the ground, he had climbed onto the canvas roof of a taxi only to fall through and suffer a cut to his knee. Nevertheless, Cardiff were considered slight favourites heading into the game.

In contrast, Sheffield United's forward players were deemed to be the team's strength by The Times, especially the inside-forward pairing of club captain Billy Gillespie and Fred Tunstall. The side's defence were seen to be considerably weaker; The Times predicted that the match could "turn into an ordeal" for goalkeeper Sutcliffe, whose brother John had played in goal for Bolton Wanderers when they lost in the 1894 FA Cup Final. United's Boyle and Harry Johnson were appearing in their first FA Cup final. Their fathers, Peter Boyle and Harry Johnson Sr, had both won the FA Cup with United in 1902. Sampy, who had scored two goals in the second round, was dropped in favour of Boyle to provide more physicality in the forward line. The Express described the United side as "good cup fighters with a workmanlike rather than polished team".

The 1925 final was held on 25 April and was the 50th hosting of the event. Despite Wembley Stadium having a capacity of 92,000, only 1,750 tickets were allocated to each side, although the FA did increase the number to 4,000 when Cardiff lodged an appeal. It is estimated around 40,000 Cardiff fans were able to secure tickets for the match through general sale. More than half of these arrived on 34 trains that were laid on by the Great Western Railway to carry fans from Cardiff to London from 9:30 pm the previous day, the last departing at 1:30 am on the day of the game. A further 15 trains were laid on from the Birmingham and Wolverhampton areas and 5 from the Sheffield area.

Before the match, the teams were presented to the Duke and Duchess of York by the president of the Football Association, Charles Clegg. The Duke and Duchess took up seats in the Royal Box for the match, accompanied by members of the FA. Former Prime Minister Ramsay MacDonald was seated behind the Royal Box and accepted an offer for him and his acquaintances to take up seats alongside the Duke and Duchess at half-time. The bands of the Irish Guards and the Royal Air Force played the national anthem before the match as well as "Land of Hope and Glory" and other songs during the half-time interval. The referee for the match was Noel Watson from the Nottinghamshire County Football Association and the linesmen were Harry Kingscott from the Derbyshire County Football Association and R. T. Bradshaw from the Leicestershire and Rutland County Football Association. If the match ended in a draw, a replay was to be arranged for 29 April at Old Trafford in Manchester.

=== Summary ===
The match kicked-off at 3 pm and started brightly, the first 20 minutes providing the best football of the day according to The Times. Cardiff's Hardy later noted how nervous he and his teammates were at the start of the match, describing the side as "shaking like kittens". United's forward pairing of Gillespie and Tunstall proved testing to the Cardiff defence early on and the majority of the opening period was spent in the Welsh side's half. Johnson nearly gave United the lead when he received David Mercer's cross unmarked in the opposition area but he was unable to immediately control the ball, which allowed Blair to close in and block his effort. Cardiff's best chance of the first half fell to Nicholson, who received the ball near the edge of the opposition penalty area. Despite having space to run into, Nicholson chose to shoot early but his effort went well over the bar. Nicholson caused issues for the United defence on the edge of their area that drew a foul from Ernest Milton on Willie Davies, but the resulting effort was wasted. Cardiff had few further opportunities in the first half; the Devon and Exeter Gazette described how Cardiff "placed the ball too square, so that speed was lost".

Thirty minutes into the match, Gillespie's pass was intercepted by Harry Wake on the edge of Cardiff's penalty area. Rather than clear the ball, Wake hesitated in possession and was tackled by Tunstall who advanced on Cardiff goalkeeper Farquharson before scoring the opening goal of the match from 8 yards (7.3 m). Tunstall nearly went through on goal a second time shortly after, but was quickly closed down by the Cardiff defence. The People noted that, based on the first half, the match "would have gone down to history as one of the best finals ever played", while The Express wrote that the first half was "not colourless by any means but it was not picturesque".

Cardiff started the opening minutes of the second half more assertively but failed to capitalise on their brief ascendancy. Their most promising move of these early stages was ended when Harry Beadles was flagged offside. The best chance of the second half fell to United whose forward line had advanced on the Cardiff goal "practically unhampered". As the ball was sent across the Cardiff penalty area, three United players took misplaced swipes at the ball and failed to convert for a second goal. Cardiff's attempts to control the game were limited due to an apparent injury to Hardy that left him struggling to keep pace. Johnson sent a strong shot towards the Cardiff goal 15 minutes into the second half which Nelson blocked. The Sunday Pictorial described the two sides in the second half as "working hard without having, apparently, any definite aim in view".

In the final minutes of the match, Cardiff desperately pressed for an equalising goal. One push forward by the side led to a penalty area scramble that saw three shots blocked by Sheffield defenders before Gill's final effort was "feeble and wide". Cardiff's forays forward also provided opportunities for United on the counter-attack; a free kick awarded for a foul on Johnson was wasted while Boyle forced a save from Farquharson late on before the referee blew the final whistle.

=== Details ===
25 April 1925
3 pm BST

Sheffield United	1–0	Cardiff City
Tunstall 30'

Wembley Stadium, London
Attendance: 91,763
Referee: G. N. Watson (Nottinghamshire)

Sheffield United	Cardiff City

GK	(England) Charles Sutcliffe
DF	(England) Billy Cook
DF	(England) Ernest Milton
HB	(England) Harry Pantling
HB	(England) Seth King
HB	(England) George Green
FW	(England) David Mercer
FW	(England) Tommy Boyle
FW	(England) Harry Johnson
FW	(Ireland) Billy Gillespie (c)
FW	(England) Fred Tunstall
Manager:
John Nicholson

GK	(Ireland) Tom Farquharson
DF	(Scotland) Jimmy Nelson
DF	(Scotland) Jimmy Blair
HB	(England) Harry Wake
HB	(Wales) Fred Keenor (c)
HB	(England) Billy Hardy
FW	(Wales) Willie Davies
FW	(England) Jimmy Gill
FW	(England) Joe Nicholson
FW	(Wales) Harry Beadles
FW	(Wales) Jack Evans
Manager:
Fred Stewart

Match officials:

- Assistant referees:
  - A. H. Kingscott (Derbyshire)
  - R. T. Bradshaw (Leicestershire and Rutland)

Match rules:

- 90 minutes
- Replay required if tied after full-time.

== Post-match ==
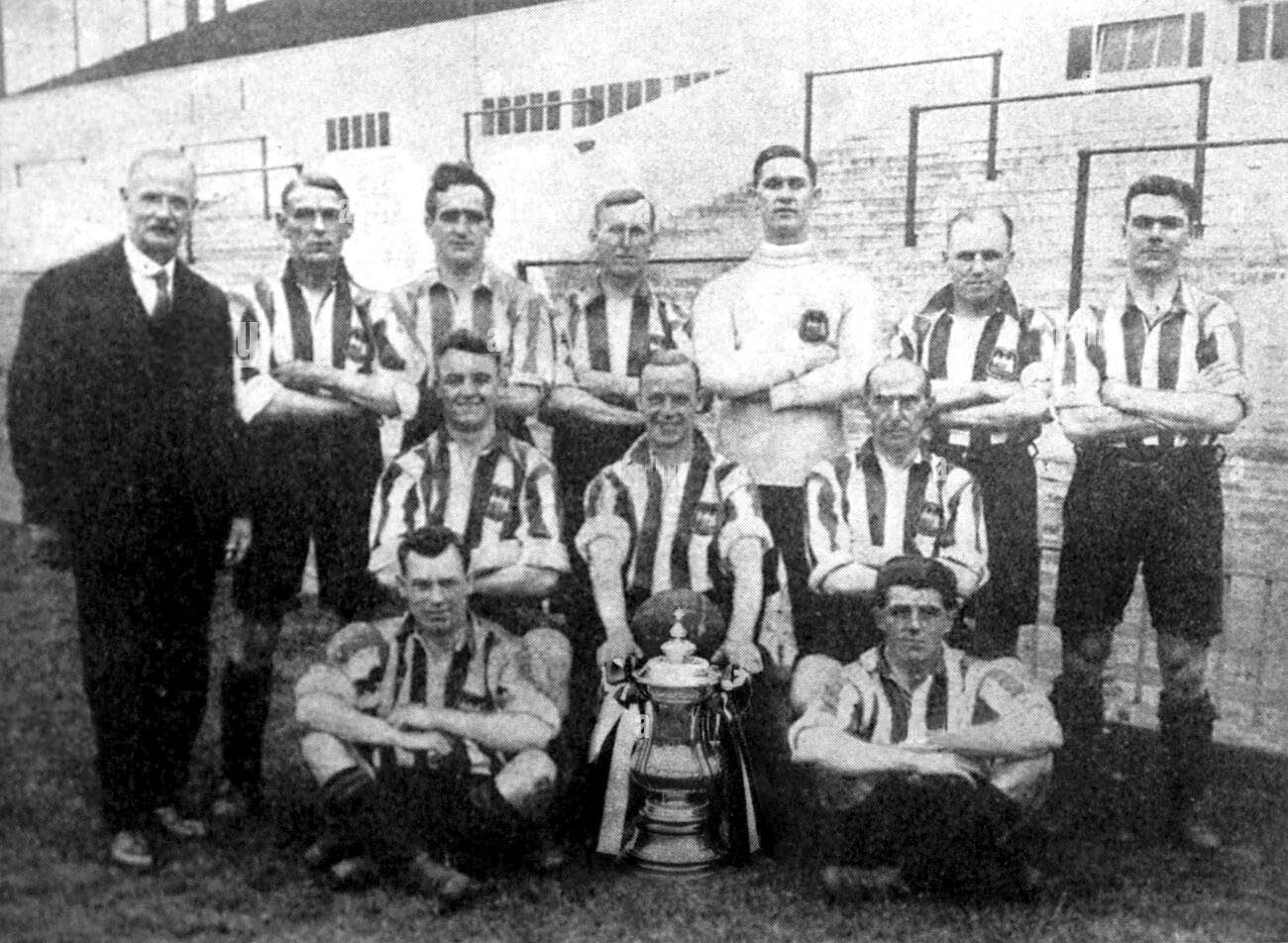
Sheffield United, winning side, posing with the FA Cup trophy

At the end of the match, United fans flooded onto the field and the goalscorer Tunstall was carried on the shoulders of spectators in celebration. The team were presented with their winner's medals by the Duke and Duchess of York in the Royal Box and the cup was awarded to United captain Gillespie. He described himself as "the happiest man in Britain" upon receiving the trophy. After the teams had left the field, the Lord Mayor of Cardiff, W. H. Pethybridge, visited the United dressing room to offer them his congratulations. United remained in London for two days before travelling to Liverpool for a match against Everton. The team returned to Sheffield on 28 April, where they were met by a crowd of thousands before being driven to the town hall where they displayed the trophy from the balcony of the building. United have reached only one further FA Cup final since 1925, losing to Arsenal in 1936.

Despite their defeat, some of Cardiff's players were carried from the field on the shoulders of the team's supporters. Cardiff defender Jimmy Nelson took home the match ball and later auctioned it in aid of Rookwood Hospital in Cardiff. A film of the final was flown to Cardiff immediately after the game and was shown on the evening of the final. The Cardiff team remained in London for two days after the final, returning home on 27 April. The side were welcomed home by large crowds despite their defeat and attended a dinner with Mayor Pethybridge the same evening.

Wake, who had lost possession for the only goal of the game, received considerable criticism for his performance after the match. The People remarked that this one error wiped out many excellences on his part, and the South Wales Echo ran the headline "Wake not Awake". His teammate Keenor absolved Wake of any blame in a post-match interview, stating "any blame should be shouldered by the rest of the defence of which I was one. A warning shout should have been given of Tunstall's first approach. Wake could not have been aware of it". Keenor remained bullish after the final, confidently predicting that "one day soon our followers can be sure that Cardiff City will bring that cup to Wales." His prediction was realised two years later when he captained Cardiff to victory in the 1927 FA Cup Final to become the only team from outside England to win the competition as of November 2020. Wake was also part of the side that reached the 1927 final, but missed the game after suffering kidney damage in a league match two weeks earlier.
