= Harry Beadles =

Welsh footballer (1897–1958)

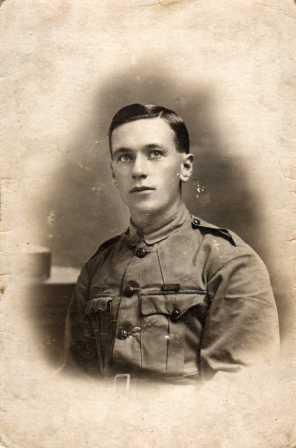

Personal information
- Full name: George Harold Beadles
- Date of birth: 28 September 1897
- Place of birth: Llanllwchaiarn, Wales
- Date of death: 29 August 1958 (aged 60)
- Place of death: Sychdyn, Wales
- Height: 5 ft 9 in (1.74 m)
- Position: Forward

Senior career*
Years	Team	Apps	(Gls)
1919–1920	Newtown		
1920–1921	Grayson's of Garston		
1921–1924	Liverpool	17	(6)
1924–1925	Cardiff City	31	(14)
1925–1926	Sheffield Wednesday	0	(0)
1926–1929	Southport	92	(61)
1929–1930	Dundalk	14	(6)

International career
1925	Wales	2	(0)

Managerial career
- 1929–1930: Dundalk
- * Club domestic league appearances and goals

George Harold "Harry" Beadles (28 September 1897 – 29 August 1958) was a Welsh professional footballer who played for Liverpool, Cardiff City, Southport and Dundalk, as well as the Wales national football team. A veteran of World War I, he served in the 7th battalion of the Royal Welch Fusiliers after enlisting at the age of 16. He took part in operations in Turkey, where he was awarded the Serbian Gold medal for his actions in saving a Serbian officer, and Palestine.

On his return to Britain, Beadles played amateur football for his local side Newtown and Liverpool based side Grayson's before being spotted by First Division side Liverpool, where he was part of consecutive First Division title winning sides in 1921–22 and 1922–23. However, he struggled to establish himself in the first team, making 18 appearances during his 3 seasons at Anfield. He joined Cardiff City in August 1924 where he spent less than two seasons, including playing in the 1925 FA Cup Final, before being sold to Sheffield Wednesday in an attempt to raise funds as the club experienced financial difficulties.

Beadles never played a senior game for the first-team with Wednesday and he later finished his career with spells at Southport, where he was the club's top scorer for three consecutive seasons in the Third Division North, and Irish side Dundalk, where he served as player-manager. During his career, he made over 100 appearances in the Football League and won 2 caps for Wales in 1925.

== Early life ==
One of seven children, George Harold Beadles was born on Commercial Street in Llanllwchaiarn, on the outskirts of Newtown, Powys, to Thomas, a quarryman who worked on building dams in the Elan Valley Reservoirs, among others, and Sarah Ann Beadles (née Pearce). As a child, he attended a local board school as his parents were keen on him receiving an education due to the economic climate in the area, but he was forced to leave at the age of twelve in order to help support his family and he instead took up employment at a local warehouse, owned by Pryce Pryce-Jones, as a furrier. His brother Albert had also previously worked at the warehouse but had been killed at the age of twelve after being hit by one of the carts used by the warehouse which was taking part in a parade. Pryce-Jones reportedly paid for the funeral.

== World War I ==
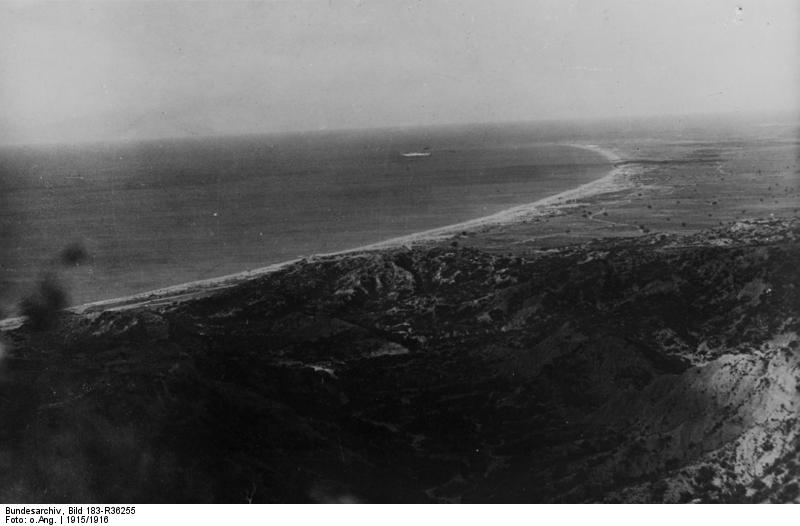
The Suvla Bay in 1915 where Bealdes took part in operations.

Upon the outbreak of World War I in 1914 Beadles, along with two of his older brothers, Ewart and Ernie, enlisted in the Royal Welch Fusiliers, even though he was only 16 years old at the time, under the permitted age of enlistment. While his regiment was stationed in Britain on training exercises, Beadles was a bugle boy. In 1915, his unit took part in the landing at Suvla Bay in Gallipoli where, despite still being under the minimum age, he served on the frontline as a rifleman. During this time, Beadles performed an action that would later see him awarded the Serbian Gold medal for gallantry. He received the honor for saving the life of a Serbian observer officer who had been wounded in no man's land and was unable to make it back to the line. Under heavy rifle and artillery fire, Beadles helped the officer back, having his cap and epaulettes shot off in the process but remaining unharmed.

He remained on the frontline until December 1915, when the area was evacuated due to the heavy fighting. Due to the extreme cold, Beadles was suffering from frostbite and was found floating unconscious in the water at the time of the evacuation and was subsequently sent to a military hospital in Malta. After recovering he was sent to re-join his regiment, who were now stationed in Palestine. He took part in all three attempts to capture Gaza and the eventual push to take Jerusalem under the command of Edmund Allenby. During the second battle of Gaza, Beadles witnessed the death of his uncle Richard Pearce who was shot in the head while standing next to him. Beadles' brother Ewart was awarded the Military Medal and promoted to the rank of Sergeant for his actions during the battle.

After the conclusion of the war, his unit remained in Palestine until mid-1919. It was here that he met former Wales international George Latham who was a captain in the regiment and the pair would go on to be lifelong friends. During their time in Palestine, Latham and Beadles played football for their unit, the 7th battalion of the Royal Welch Fusiliers, and won the British Forces in Egypt Football League Cup Final in 1919.

== Football career ==
=== Liverpool ===
On his return to Wales, Beadles played for his local side Newtown during the 1919–20 season, winning the Montgomeryshire & District Football League. The following year, he moved to Merseyside, where he turned out for amateur team Graysons of Garston of the West Cheshire Association Football League, an amateur side that represented a local shipping company, whilst also working for the company. Beadles often commented on his role at the company to family members, believing he was only employed due to his footballing skills as he would spend most working days making tea. In June 1921, he signed for Liverpool, one of the leading teams in the country at the time, along with teammate Danny Shone.

He made his debut on 24 September 1921 in a 1–0 victory over Chelsea and scored six goals in his first eleven appearances, including a brace against West Bromwich Albion on 6 May 1922, for the side as they went on to win the Football League First Division title with Beadles being praised for a bright future at the club. However, he was never a regular in the side, making just eighteen appearances in all competitions during his three years at the club, and struggled to displace the more established players, although, following being part of back-to-back league titles, Beadles, along with each member of the squad, was given a gold watch by the club. During his time at Anfield, he played in the 1922 FA Charity Shield defeat against Huddersfield Town, however he became frustrated with his lack of playing time and the club not allowing him to play for Wales in order to cover for players who were being called up by England.

=== Cardiff City ===
He moved to Cardiff City in August 1924, where his friend George Latham was working on the training staff. Signed as cover Joe Clennell, Beadles was forced to wait until 27 September 1924 to make his debut for the club, covering for the injured Clennell in a 1–1 draw with Tottenham Hotspur. He was forced to wait another month to make his second appearance for the club, playing in place of Jimmy Gill during a 2–1 victory over Everton on 18 October 1924. With Gill injured, Beadles was handed a run of games in the first-team and responded by scoring five goals in four matches during November 1924, including a brace during a 4–1 victory over Bury. His prolific form saw Clennell unable to regain his place in the side as Beadles scored four more goals for the club in December, including scoring in consecutive matches against West Ham United on Christmas Day and Boxing Day 1924. However, he was unable to maintain his form and a goal drought, failing to score in ten matches in January and early February 1925, led to manager Fred Stewart dropping Beadles from the side. He appeared sporadically for the side during the remainder of the 1924–25 season, eventually breaking his goal drought during a second 2–1 victory over Everton, as Stewart offered chances to other players, including Clennell, Alfie Hagan and Paddy McIlvenny.

He scored just two more goals in the league in the final three months of the season, in a 1–1 draw with Arsenal and a 2–1 victory over Liverpool, but scored in both the quarter-final of the FA Cup against Leicester City and a 3–1 victory over Blackburn Rovers in the semi-final as Cardiff reached their first FA Cup final. He was part of the side selected to play in the 1925 FA Cup Final, losing 1–0 to Sheffield United following a goal from Fred Tunstall. Despite his goal drought, during his time at the club Beadles won two caps for Wales, playing in consecutive matches on 14 and 28 February 1925 against Scotland and England in the 1924–25 British Home Championship. The following year, Beadles scored in the opening game of the 1925–26 season during a 3–2 defeat to Manchester City and scored three times in five further appearances in the opening months of the season. However, despite this form, Beadles was sold to Sheffield Wednesday in order to raise money due to the recession and the arrival of Joe Cassidy from Bolton Wanderers.

=== Later career ===
Beadles never played in the first-team at Sheffield Wednesday, only ever making appearances for the Yorkshire club's reserve side, and was allowed to join Southport in 1926, being appointed club captain on arrival and scoring on his debut during a 1–1 draw with Lincoln City on 28 August 1928. Arriving alongside fellow Welsh international Jack Newnes, Beadles scored 20 league goals during his first season at the club, including hat-tricks during victories over New Brighton and Walsall. He also scored in the side's third round FA Cup victory over First Division side Blackburn Rovers. However, he was forced to miss their fourth round tie against Beadles' former club Liverpool due to injury. He spent three seasons at Southport, finishing as the club's top scorer in all three seasons and setting a new club record by scoring in six consecutive matches, between 21 April 1928 and 15 September 1928.

Beadles left the club in April 1929 due to a persistent knee injury, scoring a hat-trick in his final ever game in the Football League, a 6–2 victory over Hartlepool United on 27 April 1929. During his time with Southport, Beadles scored 61 goals in 92 league matches. Following his departure from Southport, he was appointed player-coach at Irish side Dundalk, making his debut on 25 August 1929 in a match against Shamrock Rovers. In his one season at the helm of the club, he led them to the semi-final of the FAI Cup, losing 2–1 to Brideville, a sixth-placed finish in the League of Ireland and handed first-team opportunities to Joey Donnelly and Tommy Godwin. However, he retired from football at the end of the season after persistent injuries and his family being unable to settle in Ireland.

== Later life ==
After returning to Merseyside, Beadles spent a short time as a prison officer at Walton jail, whilst also working at a local sports equipment retailer. After leaving the jobs he joined Bents Brewery, who at the time were recruiting former professional footballers to front their business. After training as a manager in one of the company's pubs and hotels, he was handed control of The Shakespeare pub in White Chapel and later the Cattle Market Inn in Stanley. Having become an avid Liverpool supporter, still attending games well into old age, after his time at the club, Beadles became well known for his final bar calls at the pub, declaring "Time gentlemen please, and Evertonian's".

He impressed the brewery's managers so much that he was put in charge of the company's main hotel, The Hillside in Huyton, Liverpool in 1939 and the pub later became popular with American officers who were stationed at nearby RAF Burtonwood during the Second World War. In the late 1940s, his health declined and he was unable to continue running such a large hotel and, after running a smaller pub, he was forced into early retirement in the 1950s. After a long illness, he died on 29 August 1958 at the age of 60 in the village of Sychdyn. He was buried in Everton Cemetery in Liverpool.

== Career statistics ==
=== Club ===
Club	Season	League			FA Cup		Other (Note: Includes other competitive competitions, including the FA Charity Shield, Welsh Cup, Leinster Senior Cup and League of Ireland Shield)		Total	
Club	Season	Division	Apps	Goals	Apps	Goals	Apps	Goals	Apps	Goals
Liverpool	1921–22	First Division	11	6	0	0	1	0	11	6
Liverpool	1922–23	First Division	4	0	0	0	0	0	5	0
Liverpool	1923–24	First Division	2	0	0	0	0	0	2	0
Liverpool	Total		17	6	0	0	1	0	18	6
Cardiff City	1924–25	First Division	25	10	8	2	1	0	34	12
Cardiff City	1925–26	First Division	6	4	0	0	0	0	6	4
Cardiff City	Total		31	14	8	2	1	0	40	16
Sheffield Wednesday	1925–26	Second Division	0	0	0	0	0	0	0	0
Southport	1926–27	Third Division North	33	20	4	2	0	0	37	22
Southport	1927–28	Third Division North	36	23	4	0	0	0	40	23
Southport	1928–29	Third Division North	23	18	2	2	0	0	23	20
Southport	Total		92	61	10	4	0	0	102	65
Dundalk	1929–30	League of Ireland	14	6	3	1	12	3	29	10
Career total			154	85	21	7	14	3	189	97

=== International ===
National team	Year	Apps	Goals
Wales	1925	2	0
Total		2	0

== Honours ==
Newtown

- Montgomeryshire & District Football League: 1919–20

Liverpool

- Football League First Division: 1921–22

Cardiff City

- FA Cup runner-up: 1924–25
