= Charles Sutcliffe (footballer, born 1890) =

English footballer

Personal information
- Full name: Charles Spencer Sutcliffe
- Date of birth: 7 October 1890
- Place of birth: Bradford, England
- Date of death: 1964 (aged 73–74)
- Position: Goalkeeper

Senior career*
Years	Team	Apps	(Gls)
1910–1911	Heckmondwike		
1911–1913	Halifax Town		
1913–1915	York City		
1919–1920	Leeds City		
1920–1924	Rotherham County	102	(0)
1924–1927	Sheffield United	45	(0)
Total		147	(0)
- * Club domestic league appearances and goals

Charles Spencer Sutcliffe (7 October 1890 – 1964) was an English footballer who played in the Football League for Rotherham County and Sheffield United. At Sheffield United, Sutcliffe played in the 1925 FA Cup Final, keeping a clean sheet as the Blades won 1–0.

== Honours ==
Sheffield United

- FA Cup: 1924–25
