= Tommy Boyle (footballer, born 1901) =

English footballer

Personal information
- Full name: Thomas Boyle
- Date of birth: 27 February 1901
- Place of birth: Sheffield, England
- Date of death: 9 January 1972 (aged 70)
- Height: 5 ft 9 1/2 in (1.77 m)
- Positions: Inside forward; wing half

Senior career*
Years	Team	Apps	(Gls)
- Bullcroft Main Colliery
1921–1929	Sheffield United	127	(38)
1929–1930	Manchester United	16	(6)
1930	Macclesfield Town	0	(0)
1930–1935	Northampton Town	142	(33)
1935–1936	Scarborough		
Total		285	(77)

Managerial career
- 1935–1936: Scarborough (player-manager)
- * Club domestic league appearances and goals

Thomas Boyle (21 February 1901 – 9 January 1972) was an English footballer who played as an inside right or right half. He played for Sheffield United, Manchester United and Northampton Town, winning the FA Cup with Sheffield United in 1925. He later spent a season as player-manager of Scarborough.

== Playing career ==
Born in Sheffield, Boyle was spotted playing for the Bullcroft Colliery team and signed for Sheffield United in 1921. He initially found it difficult to establish himself in the first team, but over time his form improved, particularly his heading, which was a factor in him being selected for the 1925 FA Cup Final ahead of the more experienced Tommy Sampy. He left the Blades in 1929 after making over 140 appearances and scoring 40 goals.

Boyle signed for Manchester United for £2,000, but failed to settle and spent only one relatively unproductive season at Old Trafford in which he made just 17 starts. He was registered as a player by Macclesfield Town in May 1930 but by July of the same year had left for Northampton Town where he spent a successful five seasons, starting over 140 games for the Cobblers.

In 1935, Boyle was appointed player-manager of non-league Scarborough where he spent a reasonably successful season before retiring.

== Personal life ==
Boyle was the son of Irish international Peter Boyle who had also lifted the FA Cup trophy with Sheffield United in both 1899 and 1902. After leaving Scarborough, Boyle became the licensee of the Plough Inn in nearby Scalby, North Yorkshire.

== Honours ==
Sheffield United

- FA Cup: 1924–25
