= Vincent Matthews =

Vincent Matthews may refer to:

- Vincent Matthews (athlete) (born 1947), American Olympian
- Vincent Matthews (footballer) (1896–1950), England international footballer
- Vince Matthews, former vocalist in Dying Fetus

== See also ==
- Vincent Mathews (1766–1846), US Congressman from New York
- Vincent R. Mathews (born 1912), Wisconsin politician
