= Jimmy Blair (footballer, born 1888) =

Scottish footballer

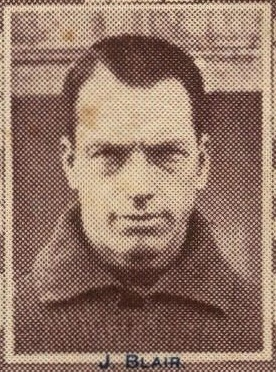

Personal information
- Full name: James Blair
- Date of birth: 11 May 1888
- Place of birth: Glenboig, Scotland
- Date of death: 28 February 1964 (aged 75)
- Height: 5 ft 9 in (1.75 m)
- Position: Defender

Senior career*
| Years | Team | Apps | (Gls) |
- Bonnybridge Thistle
| ?–1908 | Ashfield | | |
| 1908–1914 | Clyde | 157 | (4) |
| 1914–1920 | Sheffield Wednesday | 57 | (0) |
| 1916–1919 | → Rangers (loan) | 91 | (7) |
| 1920–1926 | Cardiff City | 177 | (0) |
| 1926–1928 | Bournemouth & Boscombe Athletic | | |

International career
| 1911 | Home v Anglo Scots | 1 | (0) |
| 1911–1912 | Scottish League XI | 3 | (0) |
| 1919 | → Scotland (wartime) | 3 | (0) |
| 1920–1924 | Scotland | 8 | (0) |
- * Club domestic league appearances and goals

James Blair (11 May 1888 – 28 February 1964) was a Scottish international footballer, probably most well known for playing in the 1925 FA Cup Final for Cardiff City.

His sons, Doug and Jimmy Jr., were also professional footballers.

== Career ==
=== Club ===
Blair had played for Scottish junior sides Bonnybridge Thistle and Ashfield before being signed by Clyde in 1908. He helped the club reach two Scottish Cup Finals, attracting interest from several clubs around Britain. Sheffield Wednesday signed him in 1914 for a fee of £2,000. Unfortunately he struggled to ever make a big impact on the team due to various events. Soon after joining the club he was involved in a motorcycle crash that kept him out of the team for a long period and he had made just twenty appearances following his recovery when the Football League was suspended due to the outbreak of World War I.

He returned home to Scotland during the war (winning the 1917–18 Scottish Football League title with Rangers during the second of three seasons with the Glasgow club) and Sheffield Wednesday struggled to get him to return to the club after the hostilities had ended as he was not happy with the deal being offered. He did eventually return to play for the club but, following their relegation, he left to join Cardiff City in 1920 for £3,500.

He made his debut in a 4–2 win over Blackpool and went on to establish himself in Cardiff's first team during his six years at Ninian Park. In 1925 Blair was on the losing side in the FA Cup final against Sheffield United following Fred Tunstall's goal. He left the club in 1926 and played for two years at Bournemouth & Boscombe Athletic before retiring. He later spent time in a coaching role at Cardiff before moving into the licensing trade.

=== International ===
During the early 1920s Blair became a regular for Scotland and won a total of eight caps, captaining the side on three occasions, making his first appearance on 13 March 1920 against Ireland and his final appearance on 16 February 1924 against Wales.

== Honours ==
Clyde

- Glasgow Charity Cup: 1909–10
- Scottish Cup runner-up: 1909–10, 1911–12

Rangers

- Scottish League: 1917–18
- Glasgow Cup: 1917–18, 1918–19
- Glasgow Charity Cup: 1918–19

Cardiff City

- Welsh Cup: 1921–22, 1922–23
- FA Cup runner-up: 1924–25

Scotland

- British Home Championship: 1922 –23

== See also ==
- List of Scotland national football team captains
- List of Scotland wartime international footballers
- List of Scottish football families
