= Bill Sampy =

English footballer and manager

Personal information
- Full name: William Albert Sampy
- Date of birth: 22 January 1901
- Place of birth: Backworth, England
- Date of death: 1973 (aged 72)
- Place of death: Coventry, England
- Height: 5 ft 8 1/2 in (1.74 m)
- Position: Right back

Senior career*
Years	Team	Apps	(Gls)
- Chopwell Colliery
1921–1927	Sheffield United	34	(0)
1927–1930	Swansea Town	41	(0)
1930–1933	Waterford		
1933–1934	Nelson		

Managerial career
- 1931–1933: Waterford
- * Club domestic league appearances and goals

William Albert Sampy (22 January 1901 – 1973) was an English footballer who played as a right back.

== Career ==
Sampy was playing for local side Chopwell Colliery when he was signed by league side Sheffield United in May 1921. United paid £250 for the services of Sampy and teammate Jimmy Waugh, but whereas Waugh went on to become a regular in the first team, Sampy was largely seen as a reserve and did not make his league debut until October 1924 in an away match against Bury. Occasionally featuring in the league from that point on, Sampy did not get a consistent run in the side until the 1925–26 season.

In March 1927 Sampy was signed by Swansea Town for £500 but spent much of his three seasons there in the reserves, making only 41 league appearances. In the summer of 1930 Sampy was granted a free transfer and joined Waterford in Ireland, initially as a player and then as player-manager from 1931. Returning to England, Sampy then joined non-league Nelson with whom he spent one season.

== Personal life ==
Born in Backworth, Northumberland, Bill Sampy was the younger brother of fellow Sheffield United player Tommy Sampy, although the two only played together on very rare occasions.
