= George Green (footballer, born 1901) =

English footballer (1901–1980)

Personal information
- Full name: George Henry Green
- Date of birth: 2 May 1901
- Place of birth: Leamington Spa, England
- Date of death: 1980 (aged 78–79)
- Position: Wing half

Senior career*
Years	Team	Apps	(Gls)
- Leamington St John's
- Leamington Imperial
- Leamington Town
- Nuneaton Town
1923–1934	Sheffield United	393	(10)
1934–1936	Leamington Town		

International career
1925–1928	England	8	(0)
- * Club domestic league appearances and goals

George Henry Green (2 May 1901 – 1980) was an English footballer who played as a wing half in the Football League with Sheffield United in the 1920s and 1930s.

He was born in Leamington Spa and played for a number of local teams before signing for First Division side Sheffield United in 1923. He went on to make 422 senior appearances for the Yorkshire club, scoring 11 times. He was a member of the successful United side that won the FA Cup in 1925.

Four weeks after winning the FA Cup, Green was awarded his first England cap against France. He went on to appear eight times for his country, winning his last cap against Belgium on 19 May 1928.

He finished his career at Leamington Town.

== Honours ==
Sheffield United

- FA Cup: 1924–25
