= Nick Montgomery =

Footballer (born 1981)

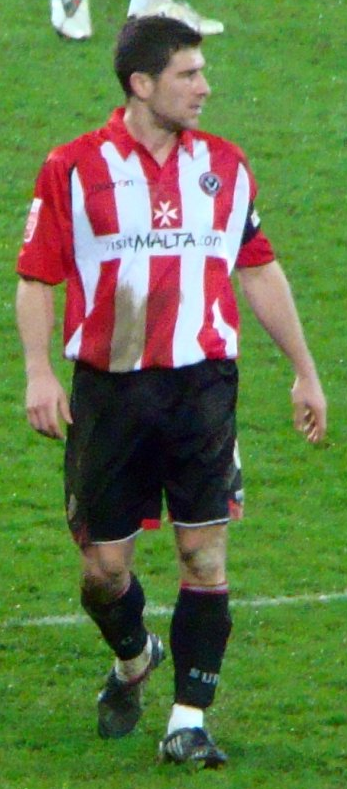
- Montgomery in 2010

Personal information
- Full name: Nicholas Anthony Montgomery
- Date of birth: 28 October 1981 (age 45)
- Place of birth: Leeds, England
- Height: 5 ft 9 in (1.75 m)
- Position: Defensive midfielder

Team information
- Current team: Beijing Guoan (manager)

Youth career
- Leeds United
- Sheffield United

Senior career*
Years	Team	Apps	(Gls)
2000–2012	Sheffield United	349	(9)
2012	→ Millwall (loan)	2	(0)
2012–2017	Central Coast Mariners	113	(3)
2017–2018	Wollongong Wolves	30	(3)
Total		494	(15)

International career
2003	Scotland U21	2	(1)
2005	Scotland Futures	1	(0)

Managerial career
- 2021–2023: Central Coast Mariners
- 2023–2024: Hibernian
- 2026–: Beijing Guoan
- * Club domestic league appearances and goals

Nicholas Anthony Montgomery (born 28 October 1981) is a professional football coach and former player who is the head coach of Chinese Super League club Beijing Guoan. Born in England, Montgomery represented Scotland at under-21 level and as part of a Scotland 'Futures' side.

A defensive midfielder, Montgomery spent the majority of his career with Sheffield United, making 398 appearances across twelve seasons. Towards the end of his time in England, he had a short spell on loan with Millwall. In 2012, he moved to Australia to play for Central Coast Mariners, and became club captain in 2015. After leaving the Mariners in 2017, he went on to play for Wollongong Wolves for two seasons. He obtained Australian citizenship in 2017.

After retiring as a player, Montgomery became an assistant coach at Central Coast Mariners. He became their head coach in 2021 and guided them to the A-League championship in 2023. Later that year he became head coach of Hibernian, but he was sacked from that position after eight months. In June 2024 Montgomery was named an assistant coach for Tottenham Hotspur, where he won the UEFA Europa League. In September 2025 he became an assistant coach for Nottingham Forest, but was sacked from this position in October 2025.

== Club career ==
=== Sheffield United ===
Montgomery was born in Leeds, England. He supported Leeds United as a child and was at Leeds United's Academy for six years. He then was offered a two-year scholarship at Sheffield United. He made his first team debut for the Blades at Carrow Road against Norwich City on 21 October 2000. He subsequently established himself as a regular in the first-team where he became a mainstay of central midfield for the Blades. Montgomery had to wait until November 2001 before he scored his first goal for the club, coming in a 4–0 home victory over Birmingham City.

Montgomery was an integral member of the 2005–06 squad that saw the Blades being promoted back to the Premier League. As a result of his hard work over the season, he was runner-up to Phil Jagielka in the club's Player of Year awards.

During the 2009–10 season Montgomery played a main role in an injury plagued Sheffield United squad eventually winning player of the season, including scoring his first league goal for four seasons in the Blades 3–0 home victory against Blackpool in March 2010. With the club looking to reduce their wage bill, a few months of speculation followed as to whether he would leave United but he eventually signed a new three-year deal in June that year after reportedly turning down an approach from Yorkshire rivals Leeds United, despite being a lifelong Leeds fan.

For the 2011–2012 season the Blades found themselves in the third tier of English football for the first time in over 20 years and Montgomery found himself out of the first team picture for the first time in his United career. Losing his place in midfield to Michael Doyle he was confined to occasional substitute appearances as the season progressed. With first team opportunities limited Montgomery joined Championship team Millwall on loan in March 2012, agreeing a deal to remain there until the end of the season. However at the end of the month Montgomery's loan spell came to an end after he sustained a calf problem, forcing him to return to Bramall Lane for medical treatment. He only had twenty minutes of game time with Millwall as substitutions against Doncaster Rovers and Leeds United. Montgomery still went on to make appearances as a Sheffield United player, including playing in the play-offs, in which the team lost to Huddersfield Town in the final at Wembley Stadium on penalties.

=== Central Coast Mariners ===
Montgomery ended his 12-year stay at Sheffield United by the cancellation of his contract through a mutual agreement on 31 August 2012. This allowed him to join United's sister club Central Coast Mariners in the Australian A-League.

He was a key part to the side that reached the 2013 A-League Grand Final but missed the grand final due to suspension. The Mariners went on to win 2–0. Montgomery was elected as vice-captain for the 2013–14 season, and made his debut as captain in a 1–0 win against rivals Sydney FC on 18 January 2014.

=== Wollongong Wolves ===
Montgomery signed for the National Premier Leagues NSW outfit Wollongong Wolves for 2017.

== International career ==
Born in Leeds, Montgomery was also eligible to play for Scotland. He made his debut for the Scotland under-21s in a 1–0 victory over Austria in April 2003, and his second and last appearance in another 1–0 victory over Croatia in November. He subsequently appeared for the Scotland "B" team which at that period was referred to as the Scotland Futures Team, featuring in a 2–0 defeat of Poland "B" team in December 2005.

== Coaching career ==
=== Central Coast Mariners ===
After retiring as a player, Montgomery rejoined Central Coast Mariners as an assistant coach. He became their head coach in July 2021, and guided them to the A-League championship in 2023.

=== Hibernian ===
Montgomery was appointed head coach of Scottish Premiership club Hibernian in September 2023. He was sacked in May 2024, after the club had finished in the bottom half of the 2023–24 Scottish Premiership.

=== Tottenham Hotspur ===
On 25 June 2024, Montgomery was appointed an assistant coach at Tottenham Hotspur where he won the UEFA Europa League. On 12 June 2025, he left the club.

=== Nottingham Forest ===
He was hired by Nottingham Forest as an assistant coach in September 2025.

=== Beijing Guoan ===
On 8 January 2026, Montgomery was named the head coach at Chinese Super League club Beijing Guoan.

== Personal life ==
Montgomery has a wife, and twin daughters. He became an Australian citizen in 2017.

== Career statistics ==
=== Club ===
Appearances and goals by club, season and competition
Club	Season	League			National cup		League cup		Continental		Other		Total	
Club	Season	Division	Apps	Goals	Apps	Goals	Apps	Goals	Apps	Goals	Apps	Goals	Apps	Goals
Sheffield United	2000–01	First Division	27	0	1	0	1	0	—		—		29	0
Sheffield United	2001–02	First Division	31	2	1	0	0	0	—		—		32	2
Sheffield United	2002–03	First Division	23	0	3	0	6	1	—		0	0	32	1
Sheffield United	2003–04	First Division	36	3	4	0	1	0	—		—		41	3
Sheffield United	2004–05	Championship	25	1	5	0	3	0	—		—		33	1
Sheffield United	2005–06	Championship	39	1	1	0	0	0	—		—		40	1
Sheffield United	2006–07	Premier League	26	0	1	0	1	1	—		—		28	1
Sheffield United	2007–08	Championship	20	0	1	0	2	0	—		—		23	0
Sheffield United	2008–09	Championship	28	0	3	0	1	0	—		3 (Note: Appearances in Championship play-offs)	0	35	0
Sheffield United	2009–10	Championship	39	1	3	0	1	0	—		—		43	1
Sheffield United	2010–11	Championship	35	0	1	0	1	0	—		—		37	0
Sheffield United	2011–12	League One	20	1	1	0	1	0	—		3 (Note: Two appearances in League One play-offs, one appearance in Football League Trophy)	0	25	1
Sheffield United	Total		349	9	25	0	18	2	—		6	0	398	11
Millwall (loan)	2011–12	Championship	2	0	—		—		—		—		2	0
Central Coast Mariners	2012–13	A-League	25	1	—		—		7 (Note: Appearance(s) in AFC Champions League)	0	1 (Note: Appearance(s) in A-League Finals)	0	33	1
Central Coast Mariners	2013–14	A-League	24	0	—		—		5	0	2	0	31	0
Central Coast Mariners	2014–15	A-League	20	1	2	0	—		1	0	—		23	1
Central Coast Mariners	2015–16	A-League	22	0	1	0	—		—		—		23	0
Central Coast Mariners	2016–17	A-League	22	1	1	0	—		—		—		23	1
Central Coast Mariners	Total		113	3	4	0	—		13	0	3	0	133	3
Wollongong Wolves	2017	NPL NSW	12	1	0	0	—		—		—		12	1
Wollongong Wolves	2018	NPL NSW	18	2	0	0	—		—		—		18	2
Wollongong Wolves	Total		30	3	0	0	—		—		—		30	3
Career total			494	15	29	0	18	2	13	0	9	0	563	17

=== Managerial record ===
As of match played 8 November 2026

Team	Nat	From	To	Record				
Team	Nat	From	To	G	W	D	L	Win %
Central Coast Mariners	(Australia)	4 July 2021	11 September 2023	63	32	11	20	50.79
Hibernian	(Scotland)	11 September 2023	14 May 2024	37	12	12	13	32.43
Beijing Guoan	(China)	8 January 2026	Present	37	20	11	6	54.05
Total				137	64	34	39	46.72

== Honours ==
=== Player ===
Central Coast Mariners

- A-League Championship: 2012–13

Individual

- Sheffield United F.C. Player of the Year: 2009–10
- A-League All Star: 2014

=== Manager ===
Central Coast Mariners

- A-League Men Championship: 2022–23

Beijing Guoan

- Chinese FA Super Cup: 2026

== See also ==
- List of Central Coast Mariners FC players
- List of foreign A-League players
- List of Sheffield United F.C. players
