= Jim Tinnion =

English footballer

Personal information
- Full name: James Tinnion
- Date of birth: 19 December 1904
- Place of birth: Burnopfield, County Durham, England
- Date of death: 1977 (aged 72)
- Place of death: County Durham, England
- Position: Wing half

Senior career*
Years	Team	Apps	(Gls)
- Lintz Colliery
1928–1929	Darlington	1	(0)
1929–1930	Huddersfield Town	0	(0)
1930–1931	North Shields		
1931–1935	Barrow	120	(8)
1935	Blyth Spartans		
1935–193?	Horden Colliery Welfare		
- West Stanley
- Horden Colliery Welfare
- Chopwell Institute
- Hexham
- Annfield Plain
- * Club domestic league appearances and goals

James Tinnion (19 December 1904 – 1977) was an English footballer who made 121 appearances in the Football League playing as a wing half for Darlington and Barrow. He was on the books of Huddersfield Town without representing them in the league. He also played non-league football in the north-east of England for clubs including Lintz Colliery, North Shields, Blyth Spartans, Horden Colliery Welfare, West Stanley, Chopwell Institute, Hexham and Annfield Plain between 1927 and 1938.

== Life and career ==
Tinnion was born in Burnopfield, County Durham, in 1904. He grew into a big man: at the age of 30, he was described as "standing over 6 ft (1.83 m) in height, and weighing 13 stone (83 kg)".

He played non-league football for Lintz Colliery before joining Darlington of the Third Division North on amateur forms in 1927–28. He turned professional at the end of that season, but made only one senior appearance, replacing regular centre-half Jimmy Waugh for the league visit to Doncaster Rovers on 29 March 1929, which Darlington lost 3–1. In May 1929, Tinnion and team-mate Reg Mountford signed for First Division club Huddersfield Town. The Athletic News noted in its season preview that "with three centre half-backs on the books ... there should be ample choice for that position", and the competition proved too much. Without making a single first-team appearance, Tinnion departed Huddersfield on a free transfer, and signed for North Shields of the North-Eastern League.

In August 1931, Tinnion returned to the Third Division North with Barrow. He made 27 appearances in his first season, and continued as a first-team regular, taking his total to 129 in all competitions over his four-year stay.

Tinnion began the 1935–36 season with Blyth Spartans, but his contract was cancelled by mutual consent in mid-September so that he could join another North-Eastern League team, Horden Colliery Welfare. Over the next three seasons he had spells with West Stanley, Chopwell Institute, Hexham, for whom he was playing by January 1937, and Annfield Plain.

Tinnion died in 1977; his death at the age of 72 was registered in the Durham Northern district in the third quarter of that year.
