= Peter Boyle (footballer, born 1876) =

Irish footballer and manager

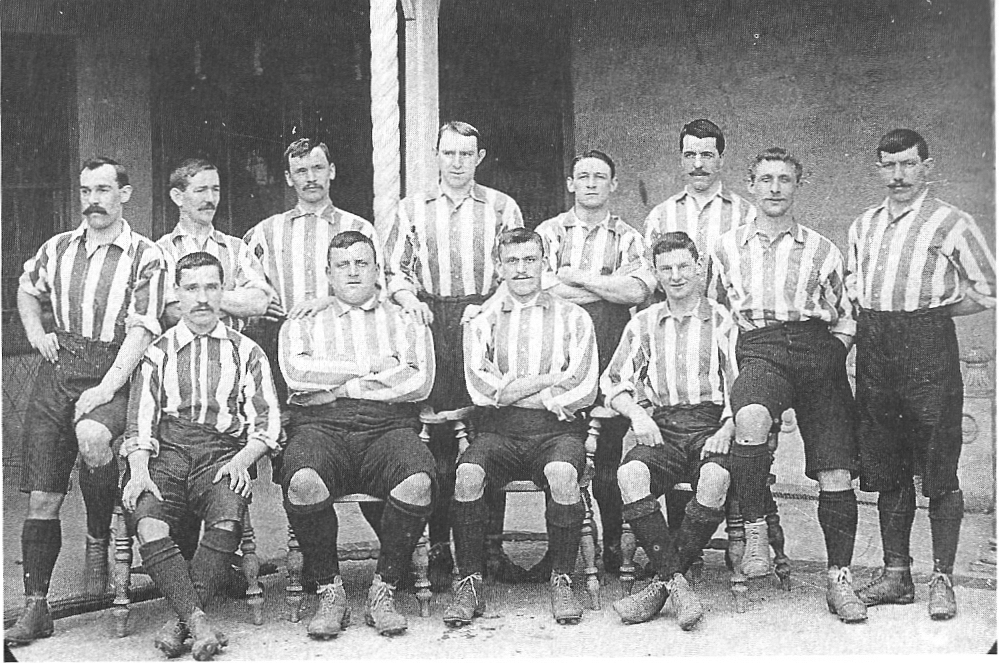
- The losing 1901 FA Cup final team; Boyle is standing third from the right

Personal information
- Full name: Peter Boyle
- Date of birth: 26 April 1876
- Place of birth: Carlingford, Ireland
- Date of death: 24 June 1939 (aged 63)
- Place of death: Doncaster, England
- Height: 5 ft 9 in (1.75 m)
- Position: Left back

Senior career*
Years	Team	Apps	(Gls)
1894–1895	Gaelic (Coatdyke)		
1895–1896	Albion Rovers		
1896–1898	Sunderland	29	(0)
1898–1904	Sheffield United	150	(1)
1904–1905	Motherwell		
1905–1906	Clapton Orient	11	(0)
1907	Wigan Town		
1907	Chorley		
1907–1908	Eccles Borough		
1912	York City		

International career
1901–1904	Ireland	5	(0)

Managerial career
- 1912: York City
- * Club domestic league appearances and goals

Peter Boyle (26 April 1876 – 24 June 1939) was an Irish footballer and manager. Born in Carlingford in Ireland, Boyle was a left back whose most successful playing spell was with Sheffield United with whom he reached the FA Cup Final on three occasions, playing on the winning side on two of them. He also played for Sunderland and Motherwell as well as representing Ireland on five occasions. He later had a brief spell as player-manager with York City in 1912.

== Career ==
=== Club career ===
Boyle moved from his home in Scotland to join Sunderland in 1896, making his Football League debut against Blackburn Rovers in December of that year. After two years at the Wearside club he moved south to the League champions Sheffield United in December 1898 for £175. He became a regular for the Blades in a period when they were a dominant force in English football, finishing runners-up in the league in his first season and winning the FA Cup in both 1899 and 1902 along with another unsuccessful appearance in the 1901 FA Cup final.

Described as a 'robust' player by the local media he was considered a 'fine tackler' and 'superb kicker' during his time at Bramall Lane. By 1903 however his relationship with the club had deteriorated following a dispute after the club failed to award him a benefit match which he believed he was owed. He was twice suspended for 'misconduct' before being transferred for a 'nominal' fee of £100 in 1904.

Having told United that he wished to return to Scotland, Boyle spent only one season at Motherwell before he moved to Clapton Orient who had recently been admitted to the Football League. He then drifted back into the amateur game with brief spells at Wigan Town, Chorley and Eccles Borough where his playing career looked to have come to an end.

After four years out of the game, however, Boyle was appointed as player-manager of newly admitted Midland League team York City in 1912, before being replaced by Tommy Collier later the same season.

=== International career ===
Boyle was capped five times for Ireland during his time with Sheffield United. He would have won several more had he not rejected the call-up on a number of occasions to play for the Blades instead.

== Personal life ==
Although born in Ireland, Boyle's family had moved to Scotland when he was a child and it was here he began playing football regularly. Following the end of his playing career he worked as a miner at Brodsworth Colliery where he also coached the colliery football team, Brodsworth Main, now Brodsworth Welfare A.F.C. His son Tommy Boyle would also go on to play for Sheffield United with whom he also won an FA Cup winners medal in 1925. During the First World War he enlisted in the York and Lancaster Regiment and was assigned to D Company of the 9th Battalion. In 1915 he was transferred to the Army Service Corps and served first in Gallipoli, probably in the 13th (Western) Division and subsequently in Mesopotamia. His family remember him telling them how he arranged for prisoners of war there to play football. In August 1917 he was serving in France and was transferred into the newly formed Labour Corps, 716 Company.

== Honours ==
Sheffield United

- Football League First Division Runner-up: 1899–1900
- FA Cup Winner: 1899, 1902
  - Finalist: 1901
