= Jimmy Waugh =

English footballer (1898–1968)

Personal information
- Full name: James Waugh
- Date of birth: 12 August 1898
- Place of birth: Chopwell, England
- Date of death: 26 March 1968 (aged 69)
- Place of death: Darlington, England
- Height: 5 ft 9 in (1.75 m)
- Position: Centre half

Senior career*
Years	Team	Apps	(Gls)
1920–1921	Durham City		
1921	Chopwell Colliery		
1921–1927	Sheffield United	126	(2)
1927–1933	Darlington	236	(0)
- * Club domestic league appearances and goals

James Waugh (12 August 1898 – 26 March 1968) was an English footballer who played as a centre half. Born in the village of Chopwell in County Durham, Waugh began his career as an amateur with Durham City before spending a brief spell representing his home town club of Chopwell Colliery at the start of 1921.

It was while at Chopwell that Waugh was spotted by Football League club Sheffield United who signed both Waugh and fellow defender Bill Sampy for a joint fee of £250 in April 1921. Waugh made a slow start to his career with the Blades and did not begin to feature regularly until November 1922, from which point he missed only one of the following 103 first team matches. Waugh was considered to lack pace and this caused him problems from 1925 when the offside rule was changed. A neck injury prevented Waugh from playing in the 1925 FA Cup Final and after a run of games at the start of the 1925–26 season he lost his place in the side to Seth King. Despite being selected for the FA tour of Canada in the summer of 1926, Waugh was unable to reclaim his place in United's starting eleven and was eventually transferred to Darlington in January 1927 after having made 143 appearances for the Blades and scored three goals.

A success at his new club, Waugh was a regular member of the match day team until 1933, including being ever present during the 1929–30 season. Waugh was part of the coaching staff at Darlington for much of his time there and took up a full-time coaching position once he retired from playing. With his career nearing an end, Sheffield United played a benefit match for Waugh in April 1932 and he later returned to the club to act as a scout from 1934.
