= Harry Gooney =

English footballer

Personal information
- Full name: William Harry Gooney
- Date of birth: 8 October 1910
- Place of birth: Sheffield, England
- Date of death: 11 June 1978 (aged 67)
- Place of death: Blackpool, England
- Height: 5 ft 10 in (1.78 m)
- Position: Wing half

Youth career
- 1926–1927: Norton Woodseats

Senior career*
Years	Team	Apps	(Gls)
1927–1935	Sheffield United	132	(2)
1935–1936	Plymouth Argyle		
1936	Luton Town		
- * Club domestic league appearances and goals

William Harry Gooney (8 October 1910 – 11 June 1978) was an English footballer who played as a wing half.

== Career ==
Gooney had captained both Sheffield and England boys while a junior and joined home-town Sheffield United immediately after leaving school in 1925, but he was under the allowed age for players and the club was forced to cancel his registration. Keen not to lose Gooney to another club United employed him as an office assistance but allowed him to train with the first team. Gooney also played as an amateur for local side Norton Woodseats until he was seventeen, at which point he officially re-joined United.

Despite showing early promise as a youngster, Gooney struggled to maintain that into his adult career, and having been hampered by three successive bouts of pneumonia, he did not make his league debut until September 1930 only a month from his twentieth birthday. Despite playing regularly from that point, Gooney struggled to make an impact and asked for a transfer in 1933 which the club refused. Gooney was appointed United's captain in August 1934 but remained unhappy and resigned the position in January 1935. United finally agreed to Gooney's transfer request at the end of the 1934–35 season, and he was sold to Plymouth Argyle for £300 in June 1935. Gooney's playing fortunes did not improve and he left Plymouth after only six months, signing for Luton Town in February 1936 before retiring four months later.

== Personal life ==
Born in Sheffield, Gooney attended Newhall School as a child. After retiring from football Gooney spent a long period unemployed before eventually finding employment with the Sheffield Electricity Department where he worked for 33 years.
