= Tommy Sampy =

English footballer

Personal information
- Full name: Thomas Sampy
- Date of birth: 14 March 1899
- Place of birth: Backworth, England
- Date of death: 1978 (aged 78)
- Place of death: Sheffield, England
- Height: 5 ft 6 1/2 in (1.69 m)
- Position: Midfielder

Youth career
- Choppington

Senior career*
Years	Team	Apps	(Gls)
- Seaton Delaval
1919–1920	South Shields		
1920	Chopwell Colliery		
1920–1934	Sheffield United	340	(27)
1934–1936	Barnsley	1	(0)
- * Club domestic league appearances and goals

Thomas Sampy (14 March 1899 – 1978) was an English footballer who played as a midfielder. Born in Backworth, Northumberland, he played for the majority of his career at Sheffield United, making nearly 400 appearances for the Blades.

== Playing career ==
Sampy played his early football in his native Tyneside in the north-east of England, turning out for Choppington, South Shields and Chopwell Colliery before being spotted by Sheffield United. Turning professional and signing for the Blades in November 1920, Sampy was initially employed as an inside right, scoring on his debut against Blackburn Rovers in February 1921. After playing regularly in that role for a number of seasons, Sampy was switched to right half in the autumn of 1925, where he played for the rest of his Blades career.

Sampy was made club captain during the 1930–31 season but lost his place and the captaincy to Harry Gooney a year later. Regaining his place in the first team during the 1932–33 season, Sampy remained a regular with United until 1934.

After 14 seasons and 383 appearances for Sheffield United, Sampy was transferred to nearby rivals Barnsley in the summer of 1934, taking the role of player-coach. His role was primarily focused on the coaching side however, and Sampy made only one league appearance for the Tykes. In May 1936, Sampy accepted a coaching role at Sheffield Wednesday where he remained until the onset of World War II in 1938.

== Personal life ==
Born in Backworth, Tyne and Wear, Thomas Sampy was the elder brother of Bill who also represented Sheffield United. Sampy was an engineer by trade and returned to his profession during World War II, working as a production manager. While playing Sampy had also owned a gentlemen's outfitters on Abbeydale Road in Sheffield.
