= John McKay (footballer, born 1898) =

Scottish footballer

Personal information
- Full name: John Reid McKay
- Date of birth: 1 November 1898
- Place of birth: Glasgow, Scotland
- Height: 5 ft 8 in (1.73 m)
- Position: Inside forward

Senior career*
Years	Team	Apps	(Gls)
- Celtic
- Blackburn Rovers
- Middlesbrough
- Hibernian

International career
1924	Scotland	1	(0)
- * Club domestic league appearances and goals

John Reid McKay (born 1 November 1898) was a Scottish footballer who played as an inside forward.

== Career ==
Born in Glasgow, McKay played club football for Celtic, Blackburn Rovers, Middlesbrough and Hibernian, and made one appearance for Scotland in 1924.
