= Vincent Matthews (footballer) =

English footballer

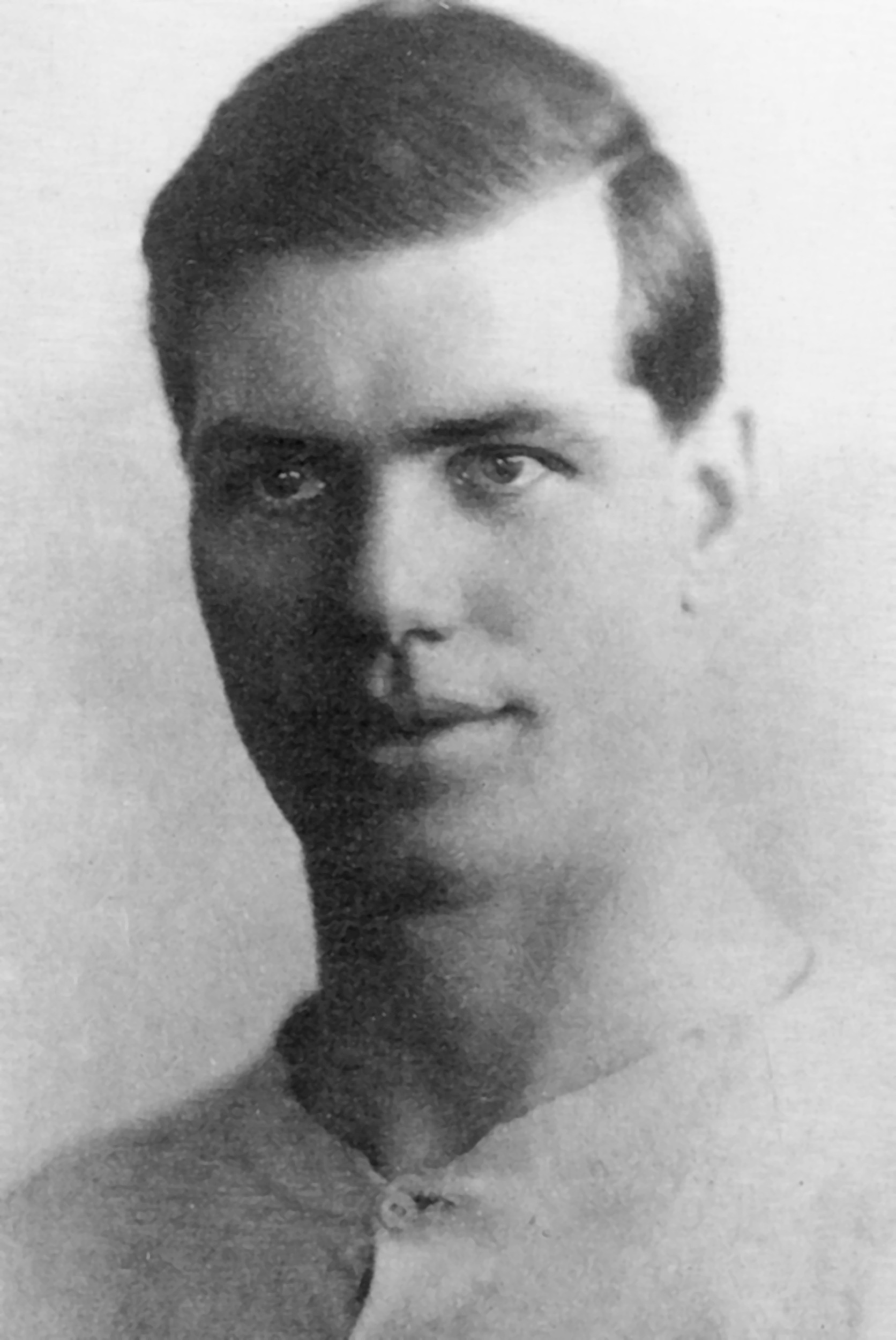
- Matthews in 1925

Personal information
- Full name: Vincent Matthews
- Date of birth: 15 January 1896
- Place of birth: Oxford, England
- Date of death: 15 November 1950 (aged 54)
- Place of death: Oxford, England
- Height: 6 ft 1 3/4 in (1.87 m)
- Position: Centre half

Senior career*
Years	Team	Apps	(Gls)
- Oxford City
- Boscombe
1922–1925	Bolton Wanderers	3	(0)
1925–1927	Tranmere Rovers	84	(3)
1927–1931	Sheffield United	125	(2)
1931–1935	Shamrock Rovers		(10)
- Oswestry Town
- Shrewsbury Town
- Morris Motors (Cowley)

International career
1928	England	2	(1)
- * Club domestic league appearances and goals

Vincent Matthews (15 January 1896 – 15 November 1950) was an English international footballer. He played for Oxford City, Boscombe, Bolton Wanderers, Tranmere Rovers, Sheffield United, Shamrock Rovers, Oswestry Town, Shrewsbury Town, and Morris Motors (Cowley).

== Career ==
Born in Oxford, Matthews joined Tranmere Rovers from Bolton Wanderers in 1925, and did not miss a match until he was transferred to Sheffield United for £1,000 in 1927. Whilst with United, he earned two caps for England against France and Belgium at the end of the 1927–28 season. Matthews has been described as a "cultured attacking centre half ... well ahead of his time."

Matthews enjoyed considerable success later in his career after he joined Shamrock Rovers during the 1931–32 League of Ireland season where he captained the side to the league title. Matthews also scored during a comeback in the 1932–33 FAI Cup final helping to bring the game to a replay which Shamrock Rovers eventually won.

== Honours ==
Shamrock Rovers

- League of Ireland
  - Winners (1) 1931–32
- FAI Cup
  - Winners (2) 1932, 1933
