= Fred Tunstall =

English footballer and coach (1897–1971)

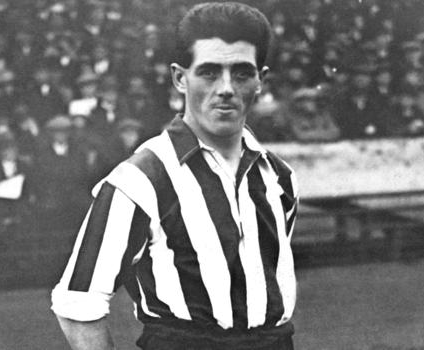

Personal information
- Date of birth: 28 May 1897
- Place of birth: Darfield, England
- Date of death: 21 July 1971 (aged 74)
- Place of death: Boston, England
- Height: 5 ft 7 1/2 in (1.71 m)
- Position: Outside left

Youth career
- Darfield St George's
- Scunthorpe & Lindsey United

Senior career*
| Years | Team | Apps | (Gls) |
| 1920–1931 | Sheffield United | 437 | (129) |
| 1932–1936 | Halifax Town | 105 | (40) |
| 1937–1940 | Boston United | | |
| Total | | 542 | (169) |

International career
| 1923–1925 | England | 7 | (0) |

Managerial career
- 1937–1948: Boston United
- 1952–1954: Boston United
- 1964–1965: Boston United
- * Club domestic league appearances and goals

Fred Tunstall (28 May 1897 – 21 July 1971) was an English football player and coach who played for Darfield St George's, Scunthorpe & Lindsey United, Sheffield United, Halifax Town, and Boston United, as well as the England national team.

== Honours ==
Sheffield United

- FA Cup: 1924–25
