= 1924–25 FA Cup =

Tournament details
- Country: England; Wales

Final positions
- Champions: Sheffield United (4th title)
- Runners-up: Cardiff City

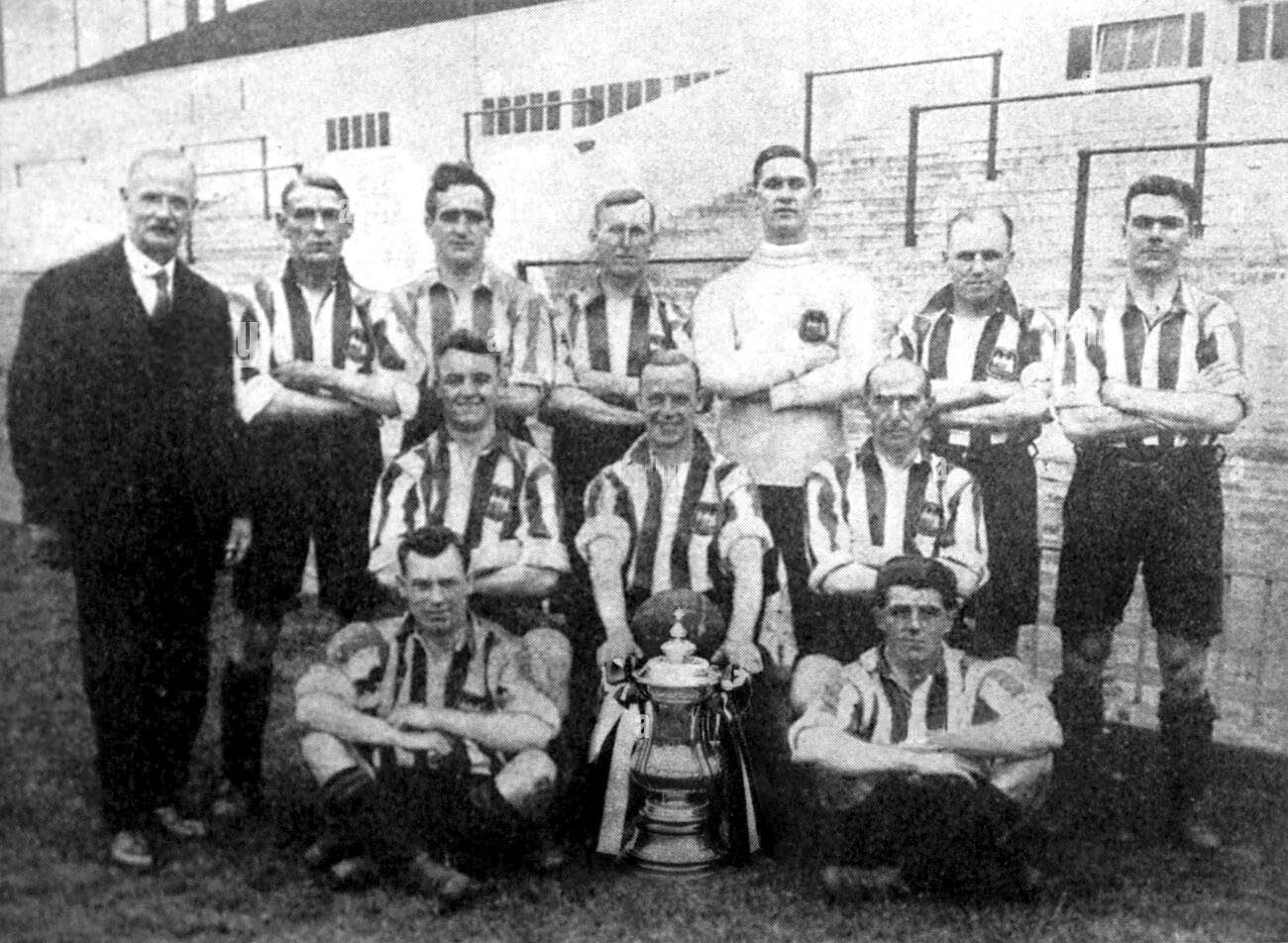
Sheffield United F.C. with FA Cup trophy; people are, fltr (back row): Secretary-manager John Nicholson, Harry Pantling, Seth King, Bill Cook, Charles Sutcliffe, Ernest Milton, George Green; (center): Thomas Boyle, Harry Johnson, Billy Gillespie; (front row): Dave Mercer, Fred Tunstall

The 1924–25 FA Cup was the 50th season of the world's oldest football cup competition, the Football Association Challenge Cup, commonly known as the FA Cup. Sheffield United won the competition for the fourth time, beating Cardiff City 1–0 in the final at Wembley.

Fans of Sheffield United sang the popular song of the era "It Ain't Gonna Rain No More" during the match.

Matches were scheduled to be played at the stadium of the team named first on the date specified for each round, which was always a Saturday. Some matches, however, might be rescheduled for other days if there were clashes with games for other competitions or the weather was inclement. If scores were level after 90 minutes had been played, a replay would take place at the stadium of the second-named team later the same week. If the replayed match was drawn further replays would be held until a winner was determined. If scores were level after 90 minutes had been played in a replay, a 30 minutes of extra time would be played.

== Calendar ==
The format of the FA Cup for this season had two preliminary rounds, six qualifying rounds, four proper rounds, and the semi-finals and final. This was the last season of the tournament in this format, as from the following season, the fifth and sixth qualifying rounds would be renumbered as the first and second rounds proper (with later rounds also consequentially renumbered).

Round	Date
Extra preliminary round	Saturday 6 September 1924
Preliminary round	Saturday 20 September 1924
First round qualifying	Saturday 4 October 1924
Second round qualifying	Saturday 18 October 1924
Third round qualifying	Saturday 1 November 1924
Fourth round qualifying	Saturday 15 November 1924
Fifth round qualifying	Saturday 29 November 1924
Sixth round qualifying	Saturday 13 December 1924
First round proper	Saturday 10 January 1925
Second round proper	Saturday 31 January 1925
Third round proper	Saturday 21 February 1925
Fourth round proper	Saturday 7 March 1925
Semi-finals	Saturday 28 March 1925
Final	Saturday 25 April 1925

== Qualifying rounds ==
37 Football League clubs joined the participating non-league teams entering this season's tournament in the qualifying rounds. Two Second Division sides, Port Vale and Coventry City, and 21 Third Division sides were entered in the fifth qualifying round, with the remaining Third Division teams having been entered in the fourth qualifying round.

Both Second Division sides won their first matches (in contrast to previous seasons), while four clubs from the Third Division were eliminated from the tournament in the fourth qualifying round and a further 14 were knocked out in the fifth qualifying round.

However, in a generally unproductive tournament for non-league football, only four League teams were defeated by non-league opponents. Bournemouth & Boscombe Athletic lost to Yeovil & Petter's United in the fourth qualifying round, while Lincoln City lost to Alfreton Town, Brentford lost to St Albans City, and Merthyr Town lost to Weymouth in the fifth qualifying round.

This season's Cup competition was ultimately the first (and only) edition of the tournament in which no non-league sides qualified for the first round proper. The twelve winners from the sixth qualifying round were Barrow, Darlington, Queens Park Rangers, Norwich City, Bristol Rovers, Accrington Stanley, Hartlepools United, Exeter City, Bradford Park Avenue, Doncaster Rovers, Coventry City and Port Vale.

The final non-league side in the sixth qualifying round was Crook Town (as Yeovil had been knocked out by Bristol Rovers in the fifth qualifying round). Crook was the most successful of the 152 clubs entered in the extra preliminary round, defeating Chester-le-Street Town, Craghead United, Thornley Albion, White-le-Head Rangers, Sunderland West End, Stockton and Chilton Colliery Recreation before going out to Bradford Park Avenue.

== First round proper ==
42 of 44 clubs from the Football League First and Second Divisions joined the 12 Second and Third Division clubs who came through the qualifying rounds. Indeed, had the FA not exempted amateur side Corinthian until the first round proper, this stage would have been an all-League affair for the only time in the competition's history. This would also be the last time that First Division teams started at this stage, with significant format changes set to be introduced to the tournament in 1925.

To bring the number of teams up to 64, nine Third Division South sides were given byes to this round. These were:

- Watford
- Brighton & Hove Albion
- Luton Town
- Swindon Town
- Northampton Town
- Bristol City
- Millwall
- Swansea Town
- Plymouth Argyle

32 matches were scheduled to be played on Saturday, 10 January 1925. Six matches were drawn and went to replays in the following midweek fixture, of which two went to another replay. The Tie 2 replay at Holker Street was Barrow's seventh Cup fixture in a month, as the club's sixth qualifying round match against Gillingham had gone to a fourth replay.

Tie no	Home team	Score	Away team	Date
1	Birmingham	2–0	Chelsea	10 January 1925
2	Blackpool	0–0	Barrow	10 January 1925
Replay	Barrow	0–2	Blackpool	14 January 1925
3	Bury	0–3	Sunderland	10 January 1925
4	Liverpool	3–0	Leeds United	10 January 1925
5	Preston North End	4–1	Manchester City	10 January 1925
6	Southampton	3–1	Exeter City	14 January 1925
7	Watford	1–1	Brighton & Hove Albion	10 January 1925
Replay	Brighton & Hove Albion	4–3	Watford	14 January 1925
8	Leicester City	3–0	Stoke	10 January 1925
9	Nottingham Forest	1–0	Clapton Orient	10 January 1925
10	Blackburn Rovers	1–0	Oldham Athletic	10 January 1925
11	Aston Villa	7–2	Port Vale	10 January 1925
12	The Wednesday	2–0	Manchester United	10 January 1925
13	Bolton Wanderers	3–0	Huddersfield Town	10 January 1925
14	West Bromwich Albion	4–0	Luton Town	10 January 1925
15	Derby County	0–1	Bradford City	10 January 1925
16	Everton	2–1	Burnley	10 January 1925
17	Swindon Town	1–2	Fulham	10 January 1925
18	Doncaster Rovers	1–2	Norwich City	10 January 1925
19	Sheffield United	5–0	Corinthian	10 January 1925
20	Newcastle United	4–1	Hartlepools United	10 January 1925
21	Tottenham Hotspur	3–0	Northampton Town	10 January 1925
22	Queens Park Rangers	1–3	Stockport County	10 January 1925
23	Accrington Stanley	2–5	Portsmouth	10 January 1925
24	Bristol Rovers	0–1	Bristol City	10 January 1925
25	Coventry City	0–2	Notts County	10 January 1925
26	West Ham United	0–0	Arsenal	14 January 1925
Replay	Arsenal	2–2	West Ham United	21 January 1925
Replay	West Ham United	1–0	Arsenal	26 January 1925
27	Millwall	0–0	Barnsley	10 January 1925
Replay	Barnsley	2–1	Millwall	15 January 1925
28	Hull City	1–1	Wolverhampton Wanderers	10 January 1925
Replay	Wolverhampton Wanderers	0–1	Hull City	15 January 1925
29	Crystal Palace	2–1	South Shields	10 January 1925
30	Bradford Park Avenue	1–0	Middlesbrough	10 January 1925
31	Cardiff City	0–0	Darlington	10 January 1925
Replay	Darlington	0–0	Cardiff City	14 January 1925
Replay	Cardiff City	2–0	Darlington	19 January 1925
32	Swansea Town	3–0	Plymouth Argyle	10 January 1925

== Second round proper ==
The 16 Second Round matches were played on Saturday, 31 January 1925. Five matches were drawn, with replays taking place in the following midweek fixture. One of these then went to a second replay played the following week.

Tie no	Home team	Score	Away team	Date
1	Birmingham	1–0	Stockport County	31 January 1925
2	Bristol City	0–1	Liverpool	31 January 1925
3	Southampton	1–0	Brighton & Hove Albion	31 January 1925
4	Notts County	4–0	Norwich City	31 January 1925
5	Nottingham Forest	0–2	West Ham United	31 January 1925
6	Blackburn Rovers	0–0	Portsmouth	31 January 1925
Replay	Portsmouth	0–0	Blackburn Rovers	4 February 1925
Replay	Blackburn Rovers	1–0	Portsmouth	9 February 1925
7	West Bromwich Albion	2–0	Preston North End	31 January 1925
8	Sunderland	0–0	Everton	31 January 1925
Replay	Everton	2–1	Sunderland	4 February 1925
9	Sheffield United	3–2	The Wednesday	31 January 1925
10	Newcastle United	2–2	Leicester City	31 January 1925
Replay	Leicester City	1–0	Newcastle United	4 February 1925
11	Tottenham Hotspur	1–1	Bolton Wanderers	31 January 1925
Replay	Bolton Wanderers	0–1	Tottenham Hotspur	4 February 1925
12	Barnsley	0–3	Bradford City	31 January 1925
13	Hull City	3–2	Crystal Palace	31 January 1925
14	Bradford Park Avenue	1–1	Blackpool	31 January 1925
Replay	Blackpool	2–1	Bradford Park Avenue	4 February 1925
15	Cardiff City	1–0	Fulham	31 January 1925
16	Swansea Town	1–3	Aston Villa	31 January 1925

== Third round proper ==
The eight Third Round matches were scheduled for Saturday, 21 February 1925. Four matches were drawn and went to replays in the following midweek fixture.

Tie no	Home team	Score	Away team	Date
1	Liverpool	2–1	Birmingham	21 February 1925
2	Southampton	2–0	Bradford City	21 February 1925
3	Notts County	0–2	Cardiff City	21 February 1925
4	West Bromwich Albion	1–1	Aston Villa	21 February 1925
Replay	Aston Villa	1–2	West Bromwich Albion	25 February 1925
5	Sheffield United	1–0	Everton	21 February 1925
6	Tottenham Hotspur	2–2	Blackburn Rovers	21 February 1925
Replay	Blackburn Rovers	3–1	Tottenham Hotspur	25 February 1925
7	West Ham United	1–1	Blackpool	21 February 1925
Replay	Blackpool	3–0	West Ham United	25 February 1925
8	Hull City	1–1	Leicester City	21 February 1925
Replay	Leicester City	3–1	Hull City	25 February 1925

== Fourth round proper ==
The four Fourth round matches were scheduled for Saturday, 7 March 1925. There were no replays.

Tie no	Home team	Score	Away team	Date
1	Southampton	1–0	Liverpool	7 March 1925
2	Blackburn Rovers	1–0	Blackpool	7 March 1925
3	Sheffield United	2–0	West Bromwich Albion	7 March 1925
4	Cardiff City	2–1	Leicester City	7 March 1925

== Semi-finals ==
The semi-final matches were played on Saturday, 28 March 1925. The matches ended in victories for Sheffield United and Cardiff City, who went on to meet in the final at Wembley.

28 March 1925
15:00

Sheffield United	2–0	Southampton

Stamford Bridge, London

28 March 1925
15:00

Cardiff City	3–1	Blackburn Rovers

Meadow Lane, Nottingham

== Final ==
The 1925 FA Cup Final was contested by Sheffield United and Cardiff City at Wembley. Sheffield United won by a single goal, scored by Fred Tunstall.

This was the first time a team outside England had played in an F.A. Cup Final since Queens Park of Glasgow in 1885.

=== Match details ===
25 April 1925
15:00 BST

Sheffield United	1–0	Cardiff City
Tunstall 30'

Wembley, London
Attendance: 91.763
Referee: G. N. Watson

Sheffield United	Cardiff City

== See also ==
- FA Cup Final Results 1872-
