= 1929–30 Cardiff City F.C. season =

Welsh football club season

Cardiff City
1929–30 season
- Chairman: Dr Alex Brownlee
- Manager: Fred Stewart
- Division Two: 8th
- FA Cup: Fourth round
- Welsh Cup: Winners
- Top goalscorer: League: Ralph Williams (11); All: Len Davies (15)
- Highest home attendance: 29,093 (v Swansea Town, 5 October 1929)
- Lowest home attendance: 5,793 (v Charlton Athletic, 28 December 1929)
- Average home league attendance: 12,944
Home colours

The 1929–30 season was the 29th season of competitive football played by Cardiff City F.C. and the team's first year in the Second Division of the Football League since being relegated from the First Division the previous year. They finished in eighth position overall and the season saw several first team players sold to raise funds to cover a drop in attendance figures following relegation. The season also held the first South Wales derby in the Football League between Cardiff and Swansea Town.

In the FA Cup, Cardiff achieved an upset by defeating First Division Liverpool in the third round at Anfield. However, they were unable to repeat the feat in the following round and were eliminated by Sunderland. In the Welsh Cup, Cardiff reached the final for the fourth consecutive season. They recorded a goalless draw with Rhyl, necessitating a replay. However, this was not played until October 1930 with Cardiff winning 4–2.

William Roberts was the Cardiff player with the most appearances during the campaign, playing 46 times in all competitions. Len Davies was the club's top goalscorer in all competitions with 15 goals. Ralph Williams was Cardiff's highest scorer in the league, scoring 11 times despite only joining the club midway through the season.

== Background ==
Cardiff City played in the Football League Second Division in the 1929–30 season, having been relegated from the First Division the previous year. It was the team's first season in the second tier of English football since their inaugural campaign in the Football League in 1920. The club had suffered relegation after finishing bottom of the First Division, despite conceding the fewest goals in the league. However, this record was offset by the club's ineffective offense which also scored the lowest number of goals in the division.

Ahead of the new season, manager Fred Stewart was provided with a small fund to sign new players. Albert Valentine and Don Bird were signed from non-League, Paddy Moore arrived from Irish side Shamrock Rovers and Wilfred Lievesley was signed from Wigan Borough. However, to raise funds Hughie Ferguson, the club's record signing and top goalscorer for the previous three seasons, was sold to Dundee. Two other members of the team's 1927 FA Cup Final winning side, Tom Sloan and Tom Watson also departed the club. Both players had missed most of the previous season with injury and returned to their native Ireland with Linfield. Frank Moss left the club and never returned to professional football while Tommy Hampson was also allowed to join Notts County.

== Second Division ==
=== August–December ===
Cardiff started the season against Charlton Athletic on 31 August 1929, but early optimism of a quick return to the First Division was dented as they suffered a 4–1 defeat. The Times noted that the result indicated that the gap in quality between the divisions was smaller than expected. With Ferguson gone and Len Davies dropped from the side, Cardiff began the season with new signing Valentine and highly rated teenager Walter Robbins leading their attack. The latter started the campaign well, scoring his side's goal in the opening day defeat to Charlton before adding a brace in a 2–0 win over Preston North End two days later at Ninian Park. Valentine played only one further game for the club, a 1–0 defeat to Hull City on 7 September, before being replaced by Davies. The club's fans, already disenchanted by their side's relegation, grew increasingly frustrated with Cardiff's poor form. The team's captain, Fred Keenor, was a target of their ire after the defeat to Hull and was so badly affected by the barracking that he contemplated retirement.

Cardiff's finances were also being badly affected by the relegation, with crowd numbers falling drastically. The Football Express wrote that there was "a remarkable drop in gate receipts" and that the club had taken around £500 less from the opening home matches than the corresponding two games in the First Division the previous year. Their form proved to be erratic in the early stages of the campaign following this. Draws with Stoke and Wolverhampton Wanderers and a 3–1 victory over Notts County were followed by a defeat to the latter in the reverse fixture on 25 September. Three days later, the side ended the month by defeating Bradford City by a single goal, Fred Warren's fourth of the season. The opening match of October was a meeting with local rivals Swansea Town. As the first South Wales derby to be played in the Football League, and the first league meeting between the sides since 1920, the match attracted significant interest and a season high crowd at Ninian Park of 29,093 attended the fixture which ended in a goalless draw. Despite the lack of goalscoring, the crowd gave both sets of supporters a standing ovation as they left the field at the end of the game.

Goalscoring proved an increasing issue for the side; in their next three fixtures Cardiff scored only once, Francis Harris adding his third goal of the season during a 1–0 victory over Barnsley on 19 October. Either side of the win, they suffered defeats, first against Blackpool and later Bradford Park Avenue. This prompted Stewart to make several changes to his side, with George McLachlan, Albert Miles and Billy Thirlaway all restored to the starting line-up. The trio all made an impact as Cardiff defeated West Bromwich Albion 3–2 on 2 November, with Miles and Thirlaway scoring either side of Len Davies. Miles scored again a week later, during a 2–1 win over Tottenham Hotspur, as Cardiff recorded consecutive victories for the first time during the campaign. He opened the scoring before Matt Robinson scored the winning goal with his first for the club. Their winning form extended to a third match, a 5–2 victory over Southampton in which Thirlaway scored a hat-trick at Ninian Park, before a defeat to Millwall broke the streak by recording a 2–0 win on 28 November.

Miles added his own hat-trick in a 5–0 win over Oldham Athletic on 30 November with McLachlan and Thirlaway also scoring. McLachlan scored again a week later in a 3–1 defeat to Nottingham Forest, however this proved to be his last for the club. After playing in a 1–0 win over Chelsea, Cardiff received an offer for his services from Manchester United and, with falling attendances continuing to drain the club's finances, eventually accepted. Warren took his place for the following match but, despite scoring, he was unable to stop his side falling to a 4–2 defeat to Bury. Cardiff won only one further match before the end of the calendar year, securing a point in two games against Bristol City, before finishing December by beating Charlton 1–0 to end 1929 in fifth place.

=== January–May ===
Cardiff began 1930 with a 2–2 draw against Hull with goals from Davies and Jimmy Munro, the latter's only goal of the campaign. Four days later, news reached the club of the sudden death of Ferguson, Cardiff's top goalscorer for the past three seasons who had been sold to Dundee ahead of the season. The forward had lost form and suffered from injuries since his departure and had struggled to deal with the barracking of supporters. After a training session, he returned to the ground where he committed suicide.

With FA Cup commitments, the side played only one further league match in January, losing 2–1 to Stoke. This defeat left Cardiff nine points behind second placed Blackpool by the end of January. With their hopes of promotion fading, the board sanctioned further sales to raise funds with a triple transfer involving John Jennings, Joe Hillier and Warren all moving to Middlesbrough for a combined fee of £8,000. Stewart was afforded a small portion of the money and signed Ralph Williams from non-League side Colwyn Bay for £800. The new signing made his debut in the club's following game as they lost 1–0 to Bradford City.

The second South Wales derby of the season was held on 8 February as Swansea, who were bottom of the Second Division at the time, recorded a 1–0 win. The match also saw the debut of 17-year-old Leslie Jones for Cardiff who would keep his place for the remainder of the season. He helped the side to their first win since December on 15 February, defeating Blackpool 4–2 at Ninian Park. Both Williams and George Blackburn scored their first goals for the club during the tie. The fixture proved to be the start of a seven match unbeaten run for the side that continued with a 2–2 draw against Barnsley on 22 February with Williams scoring a brace. Three victories were secured at the start of match: consecutive 2–0 wins over Bradford Park Avenue and West Brom were followed by a 1–0 victory over Tottenham. The unbeaten run continued to the end of March with two more fixtures; Williams adding a further three goals during a victory over Millwall and a draw with Southampton.

Their unbeaten run came to an end on 5 April with a 4–1 loss to league leaders Oldham. Cardiff's form deteriorated in April; after a 1–1 draw with Nottingham Forest, they lost three of their next four games and failed to score in each defeat. Their only win was a 2–1 victory over Reading with goals from Williams and Davies. In the final game of the season, Williams added a hat-trick in a 5–1 win over Bury. Cardiff finished the season in eighth position, 11 points behind the last promotion place.

=== Partial league table ===
Pos	Team	Pld	W	D	L	GF	GA	GAv	Pts
6	West Bromwich Albion	42	21	5	16	105	73	1.438	47
7	Southampton	42	17	11	14	77	76	1.013	45
8	Cardiff City	42	18	8	16	61	59	1.034	44
9	Wolverhampton Wanderers	42	16	9	17	77	79	0.975	41
10	Nottingham Forest	42	13	15	14	55	69	0.797	41

Rules for classification: 1) Points; 2) Goal average; 3) Goals scored

=== Match results ===
Key

- In result column, Cardiff City's score shown first
- H = Home match
- A = Away match
- pen. = Penalty kick
- o.g. = Own goal

Results

Date	Opponents	Result	Goalscorers	Attendance
31 August 1929	Charlton Athletic (A)	1–4	Robbins	24,173
2 September 1929	Preston North End (H)	2–0	Robbins (2)	13,510
7 September 1929	Hull City (A)	0–1		12,664
9 September 1929	Preston North End (A)	3–2	Matson, Warren, Harris	5,963
14 September 1929	Stoke (A)	1–1	Davies	19,065
16 September 1929	Notts County (H)	3–1	Harris, Matson, Warren	13,510
21 September 1929	Wolverhampton Wanderers (H)	0–0		13,314
25 September 1929	Notts County (A)	1–2	Warren	7,778
28 September 1929	Bradford City (A)	1–0	Warren	18,886
5 October 1929	Swansea Town (H)	0–0		29,093
12 October 1929	Blackpool (A)	0–3		15,900
19 October 1929	Barnsley (H)	1–0	Harris	12,058
26 October 1929	Bradford Park Avenue (A)	0–2		18,455
2 November 1929	West Bromwich Albion (H)	3–2	Davies, Miles, Thirlaway	11,916
9 November 1929	Tottenham Hotspur (A)	2–1	Miles, Robinson	23,071
16 November 1929	Southampton (H)	5–2	Roberts, Davies, Thirlaway	10,969
23 November 1929	Millwall (A)	0–2		14,208
30 November 1929	Oldham Athletic (H)	5–0	McLachlan, Miles (3), Thirlaway	12,112
7 December 1929	Nottingham Forest (A)	1–3	McLachlan	4,385
14 December 1929	Chelsea (H)	1–0	Davies	10,536
21 December 1929	Bury (A)	2–4	Thirlaway, Warren	9,249
25 December 1929	Bristol City (A)	0–2		17,140
26 December 1929	Bristol City (H)	1–1	Wake	25,244
28 December 1929	Charlton Athletic (H)	1–0	Miles	5,793
4 January 1930	Hull City (A)	2–2	Davies, Munro	11,695
18 January 1930	Stoke (H)	1–2	Robinson	13,888
1 February 1930	Bradford City (H)	0–1		8,287
8 February 1930	Swansea Town (A)	0–1		22,121
15 February 1930	Blackpool (H)	4–2	Williams, Blackburn, Davies, Harris	12,730
22 February 1930	Barnsley (A)	2–2	Williams (2)	7,345
1 March 1930	Bradford Park Avenue (H)	2–0	Williams, Jones	11,442
8 March 1930	West Bromwich Albion (A)	2–0	Robbins, Harris	15,310
15 March 1930	Tottenham Hotspur (H)	1–0	Jones	15,404
22 March 1930	Southampton (A)	1–1	Williams	13,725
29 March 1930	Millwall (H)	3–1	Williams (2), Jones	12,219
5 April 1930	Oldham Athletic (A)	1–4	Robbins	18,596
12 April 1930	Nottingham Forest (H)	1–1	Davies	9,328
14 April 1930	Wolverhampton Wanderers (A)	0–4		5,210
18 April 1930	Reading (H)	2–1	Williams, Davies	12,656
19 April 1930	Chelsea (A)	0–1		23,100
21 April 1930	Reading (A)	0–2		18,112
26 April 1930	Bury (H)	5–1	Williams (3), Bird, Davies	7,136

== Cup matches ==
=== FA Cup ===
Cardiff entered the FA Cup in the third round where they were drawn against First Division side Liverpool. More than 50,000 spectators attended the game at Anfield, the largest crowd Cardiff played in front of during the campaign. The side were able to upset their higher ranked opponents as Len Davies scored twice to give Cardiff a 2–1 victory. In the fourth round, they drew further First Division opposition in Sunderland but were unable to repeat their upset, losing 2–1 with Davies again scoring his side's goal.

==== Match results ====
Key

- In result column, Cardiff City's score shown first
- H = Home match
- A = Away match
- N = Neutral venue
- pen. = Penalty kick
- o.g. = Own goal

Results

Date	Round	Opponents	Result	Goalscorers	Attendance
11 January 1930	Three	Liverpool (A)	2–1	Davies (2)	50,141
25 January 1930	Four	Sunderland (A)	1–2	Davies	49,424

=== Welsh Cup ===
In the Welsh Cup, Cardiff entered in the fifth round against Llanelly and went on to win 4–1 with goals from Miles, Jones and a brace by Davies. The following round resulted in the third South Wales derby of the season as Cardiff met Swansea at Ninian Park. Cardiff started the match poorly and only two saves from Tom Farquharson prevented them falling behind early on. However they responded strongly and, by half-time, led 3–0 from goals by Thirlaway, Jones and Davies. Jimmy Nelson added a fourth goal direct from a free-kick in the last minute of the game as Cardiff won 4–0.

A 2–0 win over Wrexham in the semi-final secured Cardiff's fourth consecutive Welsh Cup final. They met Rhyl in the final and the two sides played out a goalless draw on 3 May. Unusually, the Football Association of Wales chose not to hold a replay until October, two months into the following season. In that match, Cardiff won the trophy with a 4–2 victory, with Davies scoring a hat-trick.

==== Match results ====
Key

- In result column, Cardiff City's score shown first
- H = Home match
- A = Away match
- N = Neutral venue
- pen. = Penalty kick
- o.g. = Own goal

Results

Date	Round	Opponents	Result	Goalscorers	Attendance
17 March 1930	Five	Llanelly (A)	4–1	L. Davies (2), Miles, Jones	5,000
2 April 1930	Six	Swansea Town (H)	4–0	Thirlaway, Jones, L. Davies, Nelson	8,000
23 April 1930	Semi-final	Wrexham (A)	2–0	Miles, Jones	4,000
3 May 1930	Final	Rhyl (A)	0–0		5,000

== Player details ==
Stewart used a total of 29 players during the course of the season. Defender William Roberts made more appearances than any other player, featuring in 46 matches. He missed only two games during the campaign, both in the league. Five other players appeared in 40 or more games during the season: Blackburn, Davies, Farquharson, Keenor and Harry Wake. Lievesley, signed at the start of the campaign, appeared in the first three games but never featured for the first team again. Bird and Paddy Moore both played in only one match, the latter making his only senior appearance for the club.

Davies was the club's top goalscorer in all competitions with 15 goals. He scored 9 in the league, 3 in the FA Cup and 3 in the Welsh Cup. Despite only joining the club midway through the season, Williams was their top league goalscorer. He found the net 11 times in the final 16 games of the season. No other player reached double figures during the campaign; Miles was the next highest goalscorer with 8. In total, 17 players scored at least one goal during the campaign.

=== Player statistics ===
Player	Position	Second Division		FA Cup		Welsh Cup		Total	
Player	Position	Apps	Goals	Apps	Goals	Apps	Goals	Apps	Goals
Don Bird	FW	1	1	0	0	0	0	1	1
George Blackburn	HB	35	1	2	0	4	0	41	1
Len Davies	FW	37	9	2	3	4	3	43	15
Tom Farquharson	GK	39	0	2	0	4	0	45	0
Billy Hardy	HB	8	0	0	0	0	0	8	0
Francis Harris	FW	23	5	0	0	2	0	25	5
Thomas Helsby	DF	4	0	0	0	2	0	6	0
Joe Hillier	GK	3	0	0	0	0	0	3	0
John Jennings	DF	26	0	1	0	0	0	27	0
Emlyn John	DF	6	0	0	0	2	0	8	0
Leslie Jones	FW	15	3	0	0	4	3	19	6
Fred Keenor	DF	36	0	2	0	3	0	41	0
Wilfred Lievesley	FW	3	0	0	0	0	0	3	0
Frank Matson	FW	13	2	0	0	0	0	13	2
Jimmy McGrath	HB	5	0	2	0	1	0	8	0
Jack McJennett	DF	1	0	1	0	0	0	2	0
George McLachlan	FW	8	2	0	0	0	0	8	2
Albert Miles	FW	11	6	0	0	4	2	15	8
Paddy Moore	FW	1	0	0	0	0	0	1	0
Jimmy Munro	FW	3	1	2	0	0	0	5	1
Jimmy Nelson	DF	18	0	0	0	4	1	22	1
Walter Robbins	FW	21	5	0	0	2	0	23	5
William Roberts	DF	40	1	2	0	4	0	46	1
Matt Robinson	FW	15	2	2	0	0	0	17	2
Billy Thirlaway	FW	19	6	2	0	1	1	22	7
Albert Valentine	FW	3	0	0	0	0	0	3	0
Harry Wake	HB	38	1	2	0	3	0	43	1
Fred Warren	HB	14	5	0	0	0	0	14	5
Ralph Williams	FW	16	11	0	0	0	0	16	11

== Aftermath ==
Two days after their final league match of the season, Cardiff and Swansea met for the fourth time during the campaign to play a friendly intended as a benefit game for several former Swansea players. Swansea won the match 6–2; Ronnie Williams scored five of his side's goals while Jones scored both of Cardiff's. The 10,000 strong crowd, coupled with the high attendance figures during the league meetings between the two sides, prompted plans for an annual competition to be set up. However, the plans ultimately failed to come to fruition.

Nelson and Thirlaway departed Cardiff at the end of the season, but few signings were made in their place. The following season, the club finished bottom of the Second Division and were relegated to the Third Division South.
