= 1928–29 Cardiff City F.C. season =

Welsh football club season

Cardiff City
1928–29 season
- Chairman: Walter Parker
- Manager: Fred Stewart
- Division One: 22nd
- FA Cup: Third round
- Welsh Cup: Finalists
- Top goalscorer: League: Hughie Ferguson (14); All: Hughie Ferguson (15)
- Highest home attendance: 20,174 (v Burnley, 1 September 1928)
- Lowest home attendance: 5,738 (v Blackburn Rovers, 4 May 1929)
- Average home league attendance: 14,880
Home colours

The 1928–29 season was the 28th season of competitive football played by Cardiff City F.C. and the team's eighth consecutive year in the First Division of the Football League. Having finished in sixth place the previous year, the team had a significantly worse season after being plagued by injuries to several first team players. Despite conceding the fewest goals in the league, they were relegated from the First Division after finishing bottom.

In the FA Cup Cardiff suffered similar struggles and were knocked out in the third round after losing 6–1 to Aston Villa. As of August 2020, the loss remains the club's worst defeat in the competition. In the Welsh Cup, they reached the final for the third consecutive season but were defeated 3–0 by Connah's Quay & Shotton.

Hughie Ferguson was the club's top goalscorer for the third consecutive season, netting 15 times in all competitions. He achieved this despite missing nearly half of the campaign due to injury, playing in only 23 games. John Jennings made the most appearances of any player and was ever present during the season, playing in every senior team fixture.

== Background ==
Cardiff City were competing in the First Division of the Football League for the eighth consecutive season. They finished in sixth position the previous season, despite being the third lowest scoring side in the First Division and being in the top ten for goals conceded during the campaign. An economic downturn in the South Wales region that had begun two years previously continued to impact the club as attendance figures dropped significantly and required the sale of several first team players during the campaign, including two members of the 1927 FA Cup Final winning team, Sam Irving and Ernie Curtis.

Still limited by a lack of funds, manager Fred Stewart had signed several players from non-league sides during the final months of the previous season, such as Matt Robinson, Tom Helsby, William Roberts and Francis Harris, who formed part of the first team for the 1928–29 season. In an attempt to improve the club's goalscoring record, Stan Davies was signed from fellow First Division side Birmingham. Two others, Leslie Jones and Emlyn John also arrived from nearby Welsh sides Aberdare Athletic and Mid Rhondda respectively. Cardiff had undertaken a tour of Denmark at the end of the previous season and had shown interest in signing Creutz Jensen, who had impressed the club's delegation in one match. The board secured his signing on a free transfer but he was denied a work permit by the Ministry of Labour and the move, which would have seen him become the first foreign player in the club's history, subsequently collapsed.

At boardroom level, Walter Parker was reappointed as chairman having taken a year out in which his position had been held by Watkins J. Williams. The club had invested a significant portion of its profits from winning the 1927 FA Cup in constructing a new roof for the 18,000 capacity Grange End Stand at Ninian Park. The new stand was due to be opened for the club's first home game of the season on 1 September 1928.

== First Division ==
=== August–December ===
Cardiff began the season with an away match against Newcastle United on 25 August 1928. Hughie Ferguson, the club's top goalscorer for the previous two campaigns, opened his account from the penalty spot as the match ended in a 1–1 draw. The club's first home match of the season was against Burnley on 1 September and was preceded by an opening ceremony for the newly constructed roof above the Grange End Stand which was led by the Lord Mayor of Cardiff, Arthur John Howell. Ferguson continued his strong start to the season by scoring five times, with Len Davies adding a brace, during a 7–0 victory. As of August 2020, the result remains the team's largest win in the top tier while Ferguson's tally of five is the most scored by a Cardiff player in a league match, tied with Walter Robbins and Jim Henderson. Their first defeat of the season followed a week later as they lost 2–0 to Derby County.

Ferguson scored a brace on 10 September during a 3–2 win over West Ham United, with Billy Thirlaway also scoring his first of the season. Stan Davies scored his first goal for the club following his transfer in the next match, but was unable to stop the side losing 3–1 to Sheffield United. Ferguson continued his scoring streak with a goal in a 1–1 draw in the reverse fixture with West Ham on 17 September and another during a 4–0 win over Bury five days later, taking his tally to ten goals in the opening seven games of the campaign to help his side to fifth place. However, Cardiff's positive start quickly ended as the first team encountered an injury crisis. Already without Tom Watson since the start of the season, Cardiff lost both Ferguson and Jimmy Nelson to injury in their next two games, defeats to Aston Villa and Leicester City. Nelson's injury ultimately ended his season, as he appeared only two more times that year, while Ferguson was plagued by injury, missing more than half of the remaining matches.

Cardiff gained their second away point of the season in a 1–1 draw with Manchester United on 13 October with George McLachlan scoring his first goal of the season. With Ferguson absent, Cardiff struggled in front of goal, losing back-to-back fixtures 1–0 against Sunderland and Sheffield Wednesday and dropping into the bottom six in the table despite possessing one of the best defensive records in the division. Stewart experimented with William Shaw, Francis Harris and Stan Davies in Ferguson's place but all were quickly replaced. Ferguson returned in a 1–1 draw with Arsenal, with Tom Sloan scoring his first league goal for the club. However, Sloan also succumbed to injury after the game and, like Nelson, would appear in only two further league matches for the rest of the season. Ferguson appeared in two further games, a 1–0 defeat to reigning league champions Everton and a goalless draw with Huddersfield Town, before again dropping out of the first team due to injury.

Cardiff ended November with a 1–1 draw with Manchester City. Potter Smith scored only the side's second goal in their previous six matches. On 1 December, Cardiff were beaten 4–1 by Birmingham but, in their following match, they secured their first victory in nearly three months by beating fellow strugglers Portsmouth. Albert Miles scored the only goal of the game to give Cardiff their first win in 11 matches to move them out of the relegation zone. Teenager Walter Robbins, who made his professional debut against Portsmouth, scored his first senior goal to earn his side a 1–1 draw with Bolton Wanderers on 15 December but two further defeats on 22 and 25 December against Blackburn Rovers and Leeds United left Cardiff in the relegation zone again. Thirlaway and Harry Wake provided some respite for the side to end the calendar year as the pair scored both goals in a 2–1 victory in the reverse fixture against Leeds and a 2–0 win over Newcastle on 29 December.

=== January–May ===
Cardiff were defeated by Bolton and Burnley in the first week of 1929, but were boosted by Ferguson's first goals since September in a 3–0 win over Derby on 19 January. He had returned from injury for the second time shortly after the Christmas period and scored a brace in the win, with McLachlan adding the other. However, the club's lack of proficiency in front of goal continued to be a problem as they recorded a goalless draw with Sheffield United on 26 January, failing to score in three of their four matches in the month. Ferguson added another goal on 2 February, but his side fell to a 4–1 defeat against fellow strugglers Bury.

Cardiff recorded consecutive 2–0 defeats against Aston Villa and Leicester in mid-February before securing their first point of the month with a 2–2 draw with Manchester United. Ferguson scored his 14th league goal of the campaign during the match, but it proved to be his final appearance of the season as he finally succumbed to the injuries that had plagued him during the campaign. The match was also the final game at the club for the other goalscorer, Stan Davies. He scored his second of the campaign, but departed soon after to take up a position as player-manager at Rotherham United. Stewart made two signings during this period to try to improve the club's fortunes, adding former England international Frank Moss from Aston Villa and Jimmy Munro from St. Johnstone, the leading goalscorer in the Scottish First Division at the time.

Despite beginning March with a 1–0 loss against Sunderland, Cardiff's hopes were raised when they defeated league leaders Sheffield Wednesday 3–1 at Ninian Park on 8 March. Thirlaway opened the scoring with his fifth league goal of the season before Len Davies and Fred Warren secured victory. However, the result was followed by three consecutive defeats to Arsenal, Liverpool and Everton, with only one goal scored in the process. A draw with Huddersfield on 30 March and a second defeat to Liverpool the following day left Cardiff bottom of the First Division table, two points from safety and having played two games more than the side in 20th place. New signing Munro scored his first goal for the club against Manchester City on 6 April, but the side fell to a 3–1 defeat at Ninian Park. A goalless draw with Birmingham left the club's fate in the hands of the teams above them, with 20th place Burnley needing only a point from their remaining five fixtures to confirm Cardiff's relegation.

Cardiff were officially relegated on 20 April as they failed to beat relegation rivals Portsmouth, drawing 1–1 at Ninian Park with a goal from Munro. Their final match of the season was another 1–1 draw at Ninian Park, this time against Blackburn Rovers with only 5,738 spectators attending. Unusually, Cardiff finished bottom of the First Division table despite conceding fewer goals than any other team in the league. However, their defensive record was outweighed by their poor offence as they possessed easily the league's lowest scoring side, scoring 13 fewer goals than the next-lowest scoring team. In total, they scored only 43 goals in 42 league games, failing to score in 17 matches during the campaign.

=== Partial league table ===
Pos	Team	Pld	W	D	L	GF	GA	GAv	Pts	Relegation
18	Everton	42	17	4	21	63	75	0.840	38	
19	Burnley	42	15	8	19	81	103	0.786	38	
20	Portsmouth	42	15	6	21	56	80	0.700	36	
21	Bury (R)	42	12	7	23	62	99	0.626	31	Relegation to the Second Division
22	Cardiff City (R)	42	8	13	21	43	59	0.729	29	Relegation to the Second Division

Rules for classification: 1) Points; 2) Goal average; 3) Goals scored
(R) Relegated

=== Match results ===
Key

- In result column, Cardiff City's score shown first
- H = Home match
- A = Away match
- pen. = Penalty kick
- o.g. = Own goal

Results

Date	Opponents	Result	Goalscorers	Attendance
25 August 1928	Newcastle United (A)	1–1	Ferguson (pen)	36,964
1 September 1928	Burnley (H)	7–0	Ferguson (5), L. Davies (2)	20,174
8 September 1928	Derby County (A)	0–2		20,462
10 September 1928	West Ham United (H)	3–2	Ferguson (2), Thirlaway	17,189
15 September 1928	Sheffield United (A)	1–3	S. Davies	24,207
17 September 1928	West Ham United (A)	1–1	Ferguson	13,750
22 September 1928	Bury (H)	4–0	L. Davies (2), Ferguson, Thirlaway	18,739
29 September 1928	Aston Villa (A)	0–1		30,190
6 October 1928	Leicester City (H)	1–2	Harris	19,477
13 October 1928	Manchester United (A)	1–1	McLachlan	26,010
20 October 1928	Sunderland (H)	0–1		15,361
27 October 1928	Sheffield Wednesday (A)	0–1		20,116
3 November 1928	Arsenal (H)	1–1	Sloan	18,757
10 November 1928	Everton (A)	0–1		25,994
17 November 1928	Huddersfield Town (H)	0–0		13,845
24 November 1928	Manchester City (A)	1–1	Smith	18,778
1 December 1928	Birmingham (H)	1–4	Thirlaway	13,691
8 December 1928	Portsmouth (A)	1–0	Miles	19,649
15 December 1928	Bolton Wanderers (H)	1–1	Robbins	11,286
22 December 1928	Blackburn Rovers (A)	0–2		11,040
25 December 1928	Leeds United (A)	0–3		28,188
26 December 1928	Leeds United (H)	2–1	Thirlaway, Wake	20,439
29 December 1928	Newcastle United (H)	2–0	Thirlaway, Wake	12,254
1 January 1929	Bolton Wanderers (A)	0–1		33,651
5 January 1929	Burnley (A)	0–3		10,966
19 January 1929	Derby County (H)	3–0	Ferguson (2), McLachlan	14,647
26 January 1929	Sheffield United (H)	0–0		17,334
2 February 1929	Bury (A)	1–4	Ferguson	9,954
9 February 1929	Aston Villa (H)	0–2		15,978
21 February 1929	Leicester City (A)	0–2		12,938
23 February 1929	Manchester United (H)	2–2	Ferguson, S. Davies	13,070
2 March 1929	Sunderland (A)	0–1		21,546
9 March 1929	Sheffield Wednesday (H)	3–1	Thirlaway, L. Davies, Warren	18,636
16 March 1929	Arsenal (A)	1–2	L. Davies	28,393
23 March 1929	Everton (H)	0–2		14,681
29 March 1929	Liverpool (A)	0–2		30,927
30 March 1929	Huddersfield Town (A)	1–1	L. Davies	13,332
1 April 1929	Liverpool (H)	1–2	Wake	16,849
6 April 1929	Manchester City (H)	1–3	Munro	11,392
13 April 1929	Birmingham (A)	0–0		12,997
20 April 1929	Portsmouth (H)	1–1	Munro	10,834
4 May 1929	Blackburn Rovers (H)	1–1	Harris	5,738

== Cup matches ==
=== FA Cup ===
Cardiff entered the FA Cup in the third round and were drawn against fellow First Division side Aston Villa. In the match, Cardiff suffered a heavy 6–1 defeat with Billy Hardy scoring their goal. As of August 2020, the result remains Cardiff's biggest defeat in the competition.

==== Match results ====
Key

- In result column, Cardiff City's score shown first
- H = Home match
- A = Away match
- N = Neutral venue
- pen. = Penalty kick
- o.g. = Own goal

Results

Date	Round	Opponents	Result	Goalscorers	Attendance
12 January 1929	Three	Aston Villa (A)	1–6	Hardy	51,242

=== Welsh Cup ===
Holders of the competition for the second consecutive year, Cardiff began their Welsh Cup campaign by overcoming Lovell's Athletic in the fifth round. Ferguson, Harris and Len Davies each scored to secure a 3–1 victory. In the sixth round, Munro scored the only goal of the game to defeat Newport County. In a repeat of the previous year, Cardiff defeated Rhyl in the semi-final to reach their third consecutive final.

In the final, they met Connah's Quay & Shotton and were considered the overwhelming favourites in the media for the match. However, the opposition side caused a major upset by winning 3–0, a defeat which Christian Saunders describes in his 2013 book From the Ashes – The Real Story of Cardiff City Football Club as "one of the biggest shocks the ... tournament ever produced".

==== Match results ====
Key

- In result column, Cardiff City's score shown first
- H = Home match
- A = Away match
- N = Neutral venue
- pen. = Penalty kick
- o.g. = Own goal

Results

Date	Round	Opponents	Result	Goalscorers	Attendance
27 February 1929	Five	Lovell's Athletic (H)	3–1	Ferguson, Harris, L. Davies	5,000
25 March 1929	Six	Newport County (A)	1–0	Munro	4,000
25 April 1929	Semi-final	Rhyl (A)	2–1	Blackburn, L. Davies	7,000
1 May 1929	Final	Connah's Quay & Shotton (N)	0–3		10,000

== Player details ==
During the course of the season, Stewart used a significantly higher number of players due to injury and form, with 30 making at least one appearance during the campaign. John Jennings made more appearances than any other player as he was ever present, playing in all 42 league matches and 5 cup fixtures. Prior to this season, Jennings had normally been considered a reserve player, but the long-term injuries to Nelson and Watson led to him becoming a regular. Keenor and Thirlaway were the only other players to make more than 40 appearances, while four others, Joe Hillier, Jimmy McGrath, Robinson and Watson made a single appearance during the campaign.

For the third consecutive season, Ferguson was the club's top goalscorer. He scored 15 goals in all competitions, 14 in the league and 1 in the Welsh Cup, despite missing nearly half of the club's matches during the campaign due to injury. Len Davies was the only other player to reach double figures during the season, scoring 10 times. The club's poor goalscoring record was reflected in the fact that, including Ferguson and Len Davies, only four players scored more than twice during the season.

=== Player statistics ===
Player	Position	First Division		FA Cup		Welsh Cup		Total	
Player	Position	Apps	Goals	Apps	Goals	Apps	Goals	Apps	Goals
George Blackburn	HB	24	0	0	0	3	1	27	1
Len Davies	FW	27	8	0	0	4	2	31	10
Stan Davies	FW	14	2	0	0	1	0	15	2
Tom Farquharson	GK	35	0	0	0	4	0	39	0
Hughie Ferguson	FW	20	14	0	0	3	1	23	15
Tommy Hampson	GK	6	0	1	0	0	0	7	0
Billy Hardy	HB	22	0	1	1	1	0	24	1
Francis Harris	FW	13	2	0	0	1	1	14	3
Thomas Helsby	DF	13	0	1	0	1	0	15	0
Joe Hillier	GK	1	0	0	0	0	0	1	0
John Jennings	HB	42	0	1	0	4	0	47	0
Emlyn John	DF	2	0	0	0	0	0	2	0
Fred Keenor	DF	36	0	1	0	4	0	41	0
Frank Matson	FW	6	0	0	0	2	0	8	0
Jimmy McGrath	HB	1	0	0	0	0	0	1	0
George McLachlan	FW	33	2	1	0	3	0	37	2
Albert Miles	FW	2	1	1	0	0	0	3	1
Frank Moss	HB	9	0	0	0	0	0	9	0
Jimmy Munro	FW	11	2	0	0	1	1	12	3
Jimmy Nelson	DF	11	0	0	0	0	0	11	0
Walter Robbins	FW	7	1	1	0	0	0	8	1
William Roberts	DF	21	0	0	0	4	0	25	0
Matt Robinson	FW	1	0	0	0	0	0	1	0
William Shaw	FW	2	0	0	0	0	0	2	0
Tom Sloan	HB	15	1	0	0	0	0	15	1
Potter Smith	FW	14	1	0	0	0	0	14	1
Billy Thirlaway	FW	37	5	1	0	4	0	42	5
Harry Wake	HB	17	3	1	0	3	0	21	3
Fred Warren	HB	19	1	1	0	1	0	21	1
Tom Watson	DF	1	0	0	0	0	0	1	0

FW = Forward, HB = Halfback, GK = Goalkeeper, DF = Defender

== Aftermath ==
Relegation dropped Cardiff into the Second Division for the first time since their inaugural season in the Football League. The club's decreasing finances and the income drop of falling out of the First Division led to a number of departures before the following season. Top scorer Ferguson returned to Scotland with Dundee. He suffered a loss of form and further injuries on his return and endured considerable barracking from the club's supporters. Less than 8 months after departing Cardiff, he committed suicide in Dundee's home stadium after a training session at the age of 34. Jennings, Hillier and Warren all left the club in January 1930 in a triple transfer to Middlesbrough while McLachlan also departed to join Manchester United.

In a club programme at the end of the season, Keenor bemoaned Cardiff's injury problems and noted that the season represented "a testing time of true support, both morally and financially." The club struggled on their return to the Second Division and were relegated again two years later to the Third Division South.
