= 1930–31 Cardiff City F.C. season =

Welsh football club season

Cardiff City
1930–31 season
- Chairman: Walter Riden
- Manager: Fred Stewart
- Division Two: 22nd
- FA Cup: Third round
- Welsh Cup: Semi-final
- Top goalscorer: League: Walter Robbins (11); All: Walter Robbins (12)
- Highest home attendance: 24,232 (v Swansea Town, 27 December 1930)
- Lowest home attendance: 3,841 (v Bury, 2 May1931)
- Average home league attendance: 8,267
Home colours

The 1930–31 season was the 30th season of competitive football played by Cardiff City F.C. It was the team's second season in the Second Division of the Football League since being relegated from the First Division during the 1928–29 season. They finished bottom of the Second Division after winning only 8 of their 42 league matches and scoring the fewest goals in the league and were relegated to the Third Division South.

In the FA Cup, Cardiff were beaten by Third Division South side Brentford in a replay. A replay of the final of the 1929–30 Welsh Cup was held in October 1930 with Cardiff defeating Rhyl 4–2 following a hat-trick by Len Davies. In the 1930–31 Welsh Cup, Cardiff reached the semi-final before being eliminated by Shrewsbury Town. George Emmerson featured in more matches than any other player during the season, appearing 46 times in the campaign. Walter Robbins was the club's highest scoring player, netting 12 times in all competitions.

== Background ==
Cardiff City played in the Football League Second Division in the 1930–31 season, having been relegated from the First Division during the 1928–29 season. It was the team's tenth season in the Football League since their inaugural campaign in 1920. The previous season, Cardiff had finished in eighth place in the Second Division, while a drop in attendance figures following relegation had led the club's board to allow the sale of several players to bolster their depleted finances. One highlight of the season had the first hosting of a South Wales derby since 1920, with Cardiff and Swansea Town meeting three times in during the campaign. The matches had attracted the biggest crowds of the season for both sides and the success led to plans being proposed for an annual competition between the two, but these ultimately failed to come to fruition.

Before the new season, Jimmy Nelson was sold to Newcastle United for £7,000 after nine years with Cardiff. Billy Thirlaway was also sold to Tunbridge Wells. The club's board also approached captain Fred Keenor about reducing his wages, which were still at the same level as they had been during their First Division seasons. Keenor had been earning £8 a week, but the new deal reduced this to £6 a week during the season and £4 a week during the summer. The board hoped the reduction would force Keenor to move elsewhere, avoiding any criticism from fans over selling him. Keenor however was keen to remain in Cardiff and accepted the new terms. Billy Hardy, who had been with the club since 1912, was appointed to a player-coach role.

As funds were limited, Fred Stewart made few additions to the playing squad. The most high-profile signings were George Emmerson from Middlesbrough and local amateur Eddie Jenkins.

== Second Division ==
=== August–December ===
Cardiff's opening game of the season was a South Wales derby against Swansea Town on 30 August 1930. Ralph Williams, Cardiff's top goalscorer the previous season, scored his first goal of the new campaign after 15 minutes before Swansea answered with three goals to take control of the game. Williams added a second goal late on but Swansea held on to win 3–2. The defeat proved to be the start of a five-game losing streak that began the campaign; in their following four matches, Cardiff conceded thirteen goals and scored only four in reply. They claimed their first point of the season in their sixth match on 17 September, securing a 1–1 draw with Everton with Williams scoring his side's goal. A draw with Bradford City followed three days later before Cardiff secured their first win of the season by beating Plymouth Argyle 4–1 on 22 September. Both Walter Robbins and Len Davies scored their first goals of the campaign, the former with a brace.

Davies would appear in two further matches, a defeat against Charlton Athletic on 27 September and a victory over Barnsley a week later before appendicitis ruled him out for more than four months. The latter fixture also ended Emlyn John's season when he suffered a broken ankle in a collision with an opposition player; the injury left Cardiff with ten players out injured during the early part of the campaign. Cardiff gained only one further point in October, during a 1–1 draw against Nottingham Forest, but began November positively by winning consecutive matches against Southampton and Reading. The latter victory saw Robbins score his second brace of the season while recent arrival Albert Valentine scored his first goals for the club as Cardiff ran out 5–0 winners. The side scored only once in their next three matches, defeats against Stoke City, Bradford and Wolverhampton Wanderers. On 6 December, Robbins scored the side's first league hat-trick of the season in a 4–4 draw with Millwall. Although they suffered a heavy 7–0 defeat to Preston North End a week later, Cardiff again scored four on 20 December, defeating Burnley with Robbins adding another brace.

Williams made his first appearance since October on 26 December but his goal proved to be a consolation as Cardiff lost 5–1 in the return fixture against Plymouth. Cardiff's last fixture of the calendar year was the second South Wales derby of the season. Leslie Jones scored the only goal of the game as Cardiff defeated their local rivals for the first time in the Football League.

=== January–May ===
Due to a clash with FA Cup fixtures, Cardiff played only three matches in January losing two and winning one. In the first defeat, a 3–2 loss against West Bromwich Albion, new signing Jimmy McCambridge scored a brace on his debut having arrived the day before from Everton, but was unable to stop his side suffering defeat. Their only victory came in a 2–1 defeat of Port Vale at Ninian Park on 17 January as Robbins scored a brace. Their last match in January, a 2–0 defeat to Charlton, proved to be the start of a low-scoring run as the team scored only 8 times in their final 17 league matches. McCambridge added his third goal of the campaign in a 2–1 loss to Bradford City on 4 February before the team failed to score in three consecutive matches, losing to Barnsley and Bristol City before drawing with Oldham Athletic.

Davies added his second of the season after returning from his appendicitis issues in a 3–1 defeat to Nottingham Forest on 28 February, while March opened with further defeats to Southampton and Reading. Cardiff broke an eight-match winless run on 21 March by beating Stoke 3–2 on 21 March with McCambridge scoring a hat-trick. He added a brace just over a week later in a 2–2 draw with Tottenham Hotspur but this proved to be the side's last goals until the final game of the season as they failed to score in five consecutive matches, drawing three and losing two. Their final game of the campaign ended in a 3–1 defeat to Bury as Cardiff ended the season having won only 1 of their final 17 fixtures. They finished bottom of the Second Division having scored the fewest goals in the league and were subsequently relegated to the Third Division South.

=== Partial league table ===
Pos	Team	Pld	W	D	L	GF	GA	GAv	Pts	Relegation
18	Plymouth Argyle	42	14	8	20	76	84	0.905	36	
19	Barnsley	42	13	9	20	59	79	0.747	35	
20	Swansea Town	42	12	10	20	51	74	0.689	34	
21	Reading (R)	42	12	6	24	72	96	0.750	30	Relegation to the Third Division South
22	Cardiff City (R)	42	8	9	25	47	87	0.540	25	Relegation to the Third Division South

Rules for classification: 1) Points; 2) Goal average; 3) Goals scored
(R) Relegated

=== Match results ===
Key

- In result column, Cardiff City's score shown first
- H = Home match
- A = Away match
- pen. = Penalty kick
- o.g. = Own goal

Results

Date	Opponents	Result	Goalscorers	Attendance
30 August 1930	Swansea Town (A)	2–3	Williams (2)	20,363
3 September 1930	Bury (A)	0–3		9,488
6 September 1930	West Bromwich Albion (H)	3–6	Jones, Bird, Helsby	10,987
8 September 1930	Everton (H)	1–2	Bird	11,463
13 September 1930	Port Vale (A)	0–2		9,693
17 September 1930	Everton (A)	1–1	Williams	17,464
20 September 1930	Bradford City (H)	1–1	Bird	5,839
22 September 1930	Plymouth Argyle (H)	4–1	Robbins (2), Williams, Davies	6,615
27 September 1930	Charlton Athletic (A)	1–4	Williams	12,279
4 October 1930	Barnsley (H)	2–0	Helsby, Jones	9,884
11 October 1930	Bristol City (A)	0–1		19,447
18 October 1930	Oldham Athletic (A)	2–4	Harris, Emmerson	11,663
25 October 1930	Nottingham Forest (H)	1–1	Jones	8,955
1 November 1930	Southampton (A)	1–0	Keenor	12,182
8 November 1930	Reading (H)	5–0	Robbins (2), Jones, Valentine (2)	10,902
15 November 1930	Stoke City (A)	0–1		8,666
22 November 1930	Bradford (H)	0–3		5,475
29 November 1930	Wolverhampton Wanderers (A)	1–4	Valentine	6,995
6 December 1930	Millwall (H)	4–4	Emmerson, Robbins (3)	6,400
13 December 1930	Preston North End (A)	0–7		13,457
20 December 1930	Burnley (H)	4–0	Robbins (2), Jones, Emmerson	7,485
26 December 1930	Plymouth Argyle (A)	1–5	Williams	31,106
27 December 1930	Swansea Town (H)	1–0	Jones	24,232
3 January 1931	West Bromwich Albion (A)	2–3	McCambridge (2)	13,792
17 January 1931	Port Vale (H)	2–1	Robbins (2)	8,028
31 January 1931	Charlton Athletic (H)	0–2		4,470
4 February 1931	Bradford City (A)	1–2	McCambridge	4,799
7 February 1931	Barnsley (A)	0–4		5,399
14 February 1931	Bristol City (H)	0–1		11,780
21 February 1931	Oldham Athletic (H)	0–0		8,911
28 February 1931	Nottingham Forest (A)	1–3	Davies	3,565
7 March 1931	Southampton (H)	0–1		5,555
14 March 1931	Reading (A)	0–3		9,555
21 March 1931	Stoke City (H)	3–2	McCambridge	5,372
28 March 1931	Bradford (A)	0–3		6,557
3 April 1931	Tottenham Hotspur (A)	2–2	McCambridge (2)	41,547
4 April 1931	Wolverhampton Wanderers (H)	0–3		6,659
6 April 1931	Tottenham Hotspur (H)	0–0		6,666
11 April 1931	Millwall (A)	0–0		14,328
18 April 1931	Preston North End (H)	0–0		4,082
25 April 1931	Burnley (A)	0–1		4,125
2 May 1931	Bury (H)	1–3	Jones	3,841

== Cup matches ==
=== FA Cup ===
Cardiff entered the FA Cup in the third round and were drawn against Third Division South side Brentford. The first match took place on 10 January at the opposition's Griffin Park and ended in a 2–2 draw with Jones and Valentine scoring for Cardiff. As a result, the two sides met again four days later in a replay at Ninian Park. Robbins scored for Cardiff but his side fell to a 2–1 defeat and were eliminated from the competition.

==== Match results ====
Key

- In result column, Cardiff City's score shown first
- H = Home match
- A = Away match
- N = Neutral venue
- pen. = Penalty kick
- o.g. = Own goal

Results

Date	Round	Opponents	Result	Goalscorers	Attendance
10 January 1930	Three	Brentford (A)	2–2	Jones, Valentine	16,500
14 January 1930	Three (replay)	Brentford (H)	1–2	Robbins	25,000

=== Welsh Cup ===
The Welsh Cup final the previous season had ended in a goalless draw between Cardiff and Rhyl. Unusually, the Football Association of Wales (FAW) did not host a replay of the final until October 1930, three months into the following season. On 8 October, Cardiff met Rhyl in a replay and won the match 4–2 following a hat-trick from Davies and one goal by Jones.

Cardiff entered the 1930–31 Welsh Cup in the third round where they were drawn against Barry Town on 4 March 1931. Cardiff proved too strong for their opponents despite fielding several reserve players, winning the match 7–3 with braces from Matt Robinson, Davies and Bill Merry and one from George Emmerson. For the 1930–31 season, the (FAW) had allowed English club's located near the Wales-England border to compete in the competition for the first time. Cardiff were drawn against English side Chester in the sixth round, winning 1–0 following a goal by McCambridge. However, in the semi-final Cardiff were eliminated by English opposition after losing 1–0 to Shrewsbury Town.

==== Match results ====
===== 1929–30 =====
Key

- In result column, Cardiff City's score shown first
- H = Home match
- A = Away match
- N = Neutral venue
- pen. = Penalty kick
- o.g. = Own goal

Results

Date	Round	Opponents	Result	Goalscorers	Attendance
8 October 1930	Final (replay)	Rhyl (A)	4–2	Davies (3), Jones	7,000

===== 1930–31 =====
Key

- In result column, Cardiff City's score shown first
- H = Home match
- A = Away match
- N = Neutral venue
- pen. = Penalty kick
- o.g. = Own goal

Results

Date	Round	Opponents	Result	Goalscorers	Attendance
4 March 1931	Five	Barry Town (H)	7–3	Robinson (2), Davies (2), Merry (2), Emmerson	3,000
25 March 1931	Six	Chester (A)	1–0	McCambridge	12,000
13 April 1931	Semi-final	Shrewsbury Town (A)	0–1		4,000

== Player details ==
Stewart used 32 players throughout the season in an attempt to right the club's poor form. Emmerson made more appearances than any other player during the campaign, appearing in 46 matches. Such was the frequency of personnel changes that only one other player, goalkeeper Tom Farquharson, made more than 40 appearances and only five others, George Blackburn, Tom Helsby, Jones, Keenor and John Smith made 30 or more. Three players, Ralph Blakemore, Alfred Mayo and Tom Wilson, made a single appearance during the season and would never play for the first team again. Robbins was the team's highest scorer during the campaign, netting 12 times in all competitions. He was the only player to achieve double figures during the season; his nearest rivals were Jones and McCambridge who both scored 9. In total, 13 players scored at least one goal during the season.

=== Player statistics ===
Player	Position	Second Division		FA Cup		Welsh Cup		Total	
Player	Position	Apps	Goals	Apps	Goals	Apps	Goals	Apps	Goals
Don Bird	FW	12	3	0	0	0	0	12	3
George Blackburn	HB	27	0	0	0	3	0	30	0
Ralph Blakemore	DF	1	0	0	0	0	0	1	0
Len Davies	FW	10	2	0	0	2	5	12	7
George Emmerson	FW	40	3	2	0	4	1	46	4
Len Evans	GK	3	0	0	0	0	0	3	0
Tom Farquharson	GK	39	0	2	0	4	0	45	0
Jack Galbraith	WH	12	0	0	0	3	0	15	0
Billy Hardy	HB	14	0	0	0	4	0	18	0
Francis Harris	FW	19	1	0	0	3	0	22	1
Tom Helsby	DF	29	2	2	0	1	0	32	2
Eddie Jenkins	WH	8	0	0	0	1	0	9	0
Emlyn John	DF	6	0	0	0	0	0	6	0
Leslie Jones	FW	32	7	2	1	3	1	37	9
Albert Keating	FW	6	0	0	0	0	0	6	0
Fred Keenor	DF	27	1	2	0	1	0	30	1
Alfred Mayo	FW	1	0	0	0	0	0	1	0
Jimmy McCambridge	FW	16	8	0	0	2	1	18	9
Jimmy McGrath	HB	14	0	2	0	2	0	18	0
Jack McJennett	DF	3	0	0	0	1	0	4	0
Bill Merry	FW	8	0	0	0	3	2	11	2
Idris Miles	FW	3	0	0	0	0	0	3	0
Walter Robbins	FW	25	11	2	1	1	0	28	12
William Roberts	DF	17	0	0	0	1	0	18	0
Matt Robinson	FW	2	0	0	0	1	2	3	2
John Smith	DF	33	0	1	0	3	0	37	0
Albert Valentine	FW	13	3	0	0	2	1	15	4
Harry Wake	HB	10	0	0	0	1	0	11	0
Tom Ware	DF	12	0	2	0	0	0	14	0
Bobby Weale	FW	5	0	0	0	1	0	6	0
Ralph Williams	FW	14	6	2	0	0	0	16	6
Tom Wilson	WH	1	0	0	0	0	0	1	0

== Aftermath ==
A second relegation in as many seasons prompted the club to release several long-serving players including club captain Keenor, record goalscorer Davies and Harry Wake. Other first team players who were released included Blackburn, Bird, Robinson, Valentine, Bobby Weale and Williams. Albert Keating was also due to be released following a doctor's report on his knee, however he was eventually retained for the following season. The poor results of the first team severely impacted the club's finances; attendance figures at the club averaged below 10,000 for the season and totalled around £9,000 in revenue, a drop of more than £5,000 from the previous season. The income was the lowest the club had gained since the First World War and resulted in an overall loss of £723 for the campaign. Cardiff would not return to the second tier for more than 15 years, eventually gaining promotion in the 1947–48 season.
