= 1927–28 Cardiff City F.C. season =

Welsh football club season

Cardiff City
1927–28 season
- Chairman: Watkins J. Williams
- Manager: Fred Stewart
- Division One: 6th
- FA Cup: Fifth round
- Welsh Cup: Winners
- FA Charity Shield: Winners
- Top goalscorer: League: Hughie Ferguson (18); All: Hughie Ferguson (25)
- Highest home attendance: 30,590 (v Newcastle United, 24 September 1927)
- Lowest home attendance: 6,606 (v Derby County, 19 November 1927)
- Average home league attendance: 15,607
Home colours

The 1927–28 season was the 27th season of competitive football played by Cardiff City F.C. and the team's seventh consecutive season in the First Division of the Football League. The team were reigning holders of the FA Cup starting the campaign, having won the previous year's final. As a result, there were few significant changes in the playing squad from the previous season, with the club choosing to invest funds in their home ground Ninian Park. Despite being one of the lowest scoring sides in the league, Cardiff finished sixth in the First Division and were considered title contenders until late into the campaign when they suffered a poor run of form.

In their defence of the FA Cup, Cardiff recorded victories over Southampton and Liverpool to reach the third round where they were eliminated by Nottingham Forest. In the Welsh Cup, Cardiff were able to retain their title by defeating Bangor 2–0 in the final, both goals being scored by Hughie Ferguson. They also competed in the 1927 FA Charity Shield against amateur side Corinthians as winners of the previous year's FA Cup. Ferguson was again on the scoresheet to help his side to a 2–1 victory with Len Davies scoring the winning goal.

George McLachlan appeared more than any other player during the season, featuring in 50 matches in all competitions. Ferguson was the club's top goalscorer for the second consecutive season, netting 25 times in all competitions. Poor attendance figures continued from the previous season due to the economic downturn in the South Wales region with a season low league crowd of 6,606 attending a league match against Derby County in November 1927.

== Background ==
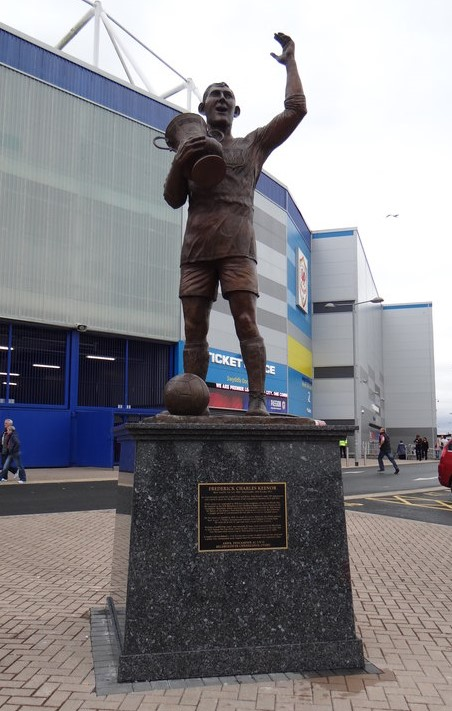
A statue of Fred Keenor holding the FA Cup outside the Cardiff City Stadium

Cardiff City were competing in the First Division of the Football League for the seventh consecutive season. The previous season, Cardiff had become the first team from outside England to win the FA Cup by defeating Arsenal 1–0 in the 1927 FA Cup Final at Wembley Stadium. However, in the league, they had endured a downturn in form and finished the campaign in 16th place.

Despite a drop in attendance figures during the 1926–27 season due to the economic situation in the South Wales area, part of the 1926 United Kingdom general strike, the Cardiff's finances were significantly boosted by the successful cup run. The gate receipts for the final had generated the club more than £23,000 in revenue, while unusual forms of income such as £40 from Columbia Records for the rights to sell recordings of the singing at the match further boosted the club. The board decided to invest the money in the club's home ground Ninian Park hiring local engineering firm Connies & Meaden to begin construction of a roof above the Grange End Stand. The club also undertook a tour of Wales after the final to display the FA Cup around the country.

The decision to invest in Ninian Park ultimately left manager Fred Stewart with little money to spend on his team. The club's programme however noted that the playing staff had never before "been so well placed for players as at present" and that the decision was made due to "the satisfaction of the directors with the men at their disposal." The signings that Stewart was able to add were inexpensive players from amateur leagues including Joe Hillier, who previously played for South Wales rivals Swansea Town, and John Ridgeway, an amateur from the Sheffield area. At boardroom level, Walter Parker decided to step down from his role as chairman and was replaced by Watkins J. Williams. Club captain Fred Keenor received offers from several English clubs having led his side to FA Cup victory, but chose to remain with Cardiff.

== Football League First Division ==
=== August–December ===
Cardiff began the season with a home fixture against Bolton Wanderers at Ninian Park which attracted a crowd of more than 24,000. Goals from George McLachlan and Len Davies secured a winning start to the campaign with a 2–1 victory. The win prompted an unbeaten start to the campaign for Cardiff who recorded four consecutive draws in their following games. Beginning with a 3–3 draw with Sheffield Wednesday, with Ernie Curtis, Billy Thirlaway and the previous season's top goalscorer Ferguson all scoring their first of the season, the run continued with a goalless draw with Blackburn Rovers and 1–1 draws with Middlesbrough and Blackburn again in the reverse fixture. Ferguson added a brace during a 3–1 victory over Birmingham City on 17 September and was among the scorers a week later during another 3–1 win over league leaders and reigning First Division champions Newcastle United, in a match which attracted a season high home crowd of 30,590 at Ninian Park. The defeat was the first Newcastle had suffered during the season and moved Cardiff into second place, with The Times picking Keenor out for praise in restricting the play of the opposition's leading forward Hughie Gallacher.

The side's unbeaten start to the season was brought to an end on 1 October as they suffered a heavy 8–2 defeat to Huddersfield. Despite the nature of the defeat, The Times attributed the severity of the defeat more to the "first-class" play of the opposition rather than the deficiency of Cardiff's play. The defeat dropped Cardiff five positions to seventh in the table at the start of October. Cardiff returned to form the following week, defeating struggling Tottenham Hotspur at Ninian Park, before drawing 2–2 with Manchester United on 15 October. In their next match, Cardiff conceded early as 21st place Portsmouth took the lead in the opening minute, before retaking control of the match through goals by Thirlaway, Ferguson and George McLachlan as they "somewhat easily" overcame the initial deficit according to The Times. With Curtis, Keenor and Len Davies absent on international duty, Cardiff fell to their second league defeat of the season to end October with a 4–1 loss against Leicester City. Cardiff's goal was scored by Potter Smith in his first appearance of the campaign, and he kept his place for the following fixture and scored again in a 1–1 draw with Liverpool on 5 November.

Despite his goalscoring efforts, Smith was replaced by the returning Curtis for a 2–0 defeat to West Ham United before Curtis himself was replaced by Willie Davies. He made his first appearance for Cardiff since 20 November 1926 in a 4–4 draw with Derby County having overcome a bout of pleurisy that had kept him sidelined and even confined to a sanatorium. He scored his side's third goal to give them a 3–0 lead in front of a home league fixture low crowd of 6,606, but Derby rallied and the match ended tied. Crowd numbers had initially remained high at the start of the season as the team's FA Cup success piqued interest, but numbers dropped as the campaign progressed with the economic downturn in the South Wales region affecting the club's supporters. The Football Express noted that "enthusiasts who, in previous seasons were regular visitors, but who now, on the score of the economy ... content themselves with a visit to selected games." Another high-scoring game followed, as Cardiff ended November with a 4–3 win over Sheffield United.

On 3 December, Cardiff met Aston Villa at Ninian Park. Ferguson gave his side the lead after three minutes and, although Villa equalised soon after, he added a second midway through the first half to give Cardiff a 2–1 victory to move into third place. They moved up to second by defeating Sunderland 2–0 a week later despite spending a period effectively reduced to 10-men due to an injury to Keenor. However, this proved to be the pinnacle of their league season as a three-game losing streak through mid-December began with a 1–0 defeat to mid-table Bury at Ninian Park, their first home defeat of the season. The match also proved to be the final game for Willie Davies who was sold to Notts County in order to raise funds as low attendance figures continued to impact the club's finances. The three-game losing streak concluded with a 2–1 losses to Burnley on 24 December and league leaders Everton two days later. The latter match was played in driving snow as Everton dominated the tie with Dixie Dean scoring both of the opposition goals. Harry Wake scored for Cardiff in only his second appearance of the season and he followed this up by scoring against Everton again in the reverse fixture the following day to help his side to a 2–0 victory. Cardiff finished the calendar year with their fourth loss in five matches, a 2–1 defeat against Bolton.

=== January–May ===
On 7 January, Cardiff met bottom placed side Sheffield Wednesday at Ninian Park, with a crowd of under 10,000 for the third time during the year. However, they were unable to live up to their higher placing and were held to a 1–1 draw. Due to FA Cup commitments, Cardiff played only one further match in January, against Middlesbrough. Thirlaway and Ferguson scored one goal each to secure a victory and progress Cardiff to fourth. Keenor and Len Davies were again absent on international duty for Cardiff's 2–0 loss to Newcastle on 4 February, but returned to help their side 4–0 win over Huddersfield a week later, with Len Davies on the scoresheet to deny their opposition the chance to go top of the table. The match was Sam Irving 's last for the club as he was also allowed to leave to join Chelsea to sure up the club's finances.

Ferguson scored his 15th league goal of the campaign to help his side to a 2–1 win over Birmingham on 22 February and was on target again three days later in a 2–0 win over Manchester United, both played at Ninian Park. However, the club's lacklustre form in away matches continued as they lost 3–0 to 21st place Portsmouth on 3 March. The travelled to Tottenham two days later and, despite being under pressure for long spells in the game, held out until conceding the only goal of the match shortly before the final whistle. Curtis became the third first team departure to raise funds after the game, joining Birmingham. Stewart made several signings from non-league sides to compensate for the sales, with Matt Robinson, Tom Helsby, William Roberts and Francis Harris all arriving by the end of the season, although none featured for the senior team during the campaign.

Cardiff defeated Leicester 3–0 on 10 March with Ferguson scoring a brace and also secured their first win away from home for two months by winning 2–1 over Liverpool at Anfield, raising Cardiff to third in the table four points behind leaders Huddersfield. However, their chances of challenging for the league title quickly evaporated with two heavy defeats; Their worst home loss of the season, 5–1 against West Ham, was a followed a week later by a 7–1 defeat to Derby County. With a congested schedule in April, Stewart named several reserves in the squad for an away match against Arsenal and the weakened side succumbed to a 3–0 defeat. Within the next four days, Cardiff played two more times and record consecutive 2–2 draws with Sheffield United and in the reverse fixture against Arsenal.

Cardiff lost 3–1 to Aston Villa on 14 April, McLachlan scoring his side's goal for his tenth of the season in the league, before beating Sunderland 3–1 a week later. The victory was the first the club had recorded in seven matches. Cardiff ended the season with a 3–0 defeat to Bury before winning their final match 3–2 over Burnley on 5 May. Cardiff finished in sixth position, nine points behind league winners Everton, despite being the third lowest scoring side in the First Division and being in the top ten for goals conceded during the campaign. Only four teams possessed a lower goal average ratio than Cardiff, three of whom finished in the bottom four. The club's strong home form was cited by journalists as a reason for the success, as they lost only twice at Ninian Park, the joint lowest in the division with league winners Everton and third placed Leicester.

=== Partial league table ===
Pos	Team	Pld	W	D	L	GF	GA	GAv	Pts
4	Derby County	42	17	10	15	96	83	1.157	44
5	Bury	42	20	4	18	80	80	1.000	44
6	Cardiff City	42	17	10	15	70	80	0.875	44
7	Bolton Wanderers	42	16	11	15	81	66	1.227	43
8	Aston Villa	42	17	9	16	78	73	1.068	43

Rules for classification: 1) Points; 2) Goal average; 3) Goals scored

=== Match results ===
Key

- In result column, Cardiff City's score shown first
- H = Home match
- A = Away match
- pen. = Penalty kick
- o.g. = Own goal

Results

Date	Opponents	Result	Goalscorers	Attendance
27 August 1927	Bolton Wanderers (H)	2–1	McLachlan, L. Davies	24,107
3 September 1927	Sheffield Wednesday (A)	3–3	Ferguson, Curtis, Thirlaway	19,218
5 September 1927	Blackburn Rovers (A)	0–0		14,343
10 September 1927	Middlesbrough (H)	1–1	McLachlan	23,033
12 September 1927	Blackburn Rovers (H)	1–1	L. Davies	15,955
17 September 1927	Birmingham (A)	3–1	Thirlaway, Ferguson (2)	23,723
24 September 1927	Newcastle United (H)	3–1	Curtis, L. Davies, Ferguson	30,590
1 October 1927	Huddersfield Town (A)	2–8	Ferguson (2)	12,975
8 October 1927	Tottenham Hotspur (H)	2–1	L. Davies, Ferguson	21,811
15 October 1927	Manchester United (A)	2–2	Thirlaway, Curtis	31,090
22 October 1927	Portsmouth (H)	3–1	Thirlaway, Ferguson, McLachlan	9,060
29 October 1927	Leicester City (A)	1–4	Smith	25,634
5 November 1927	Liverpool (H)	1–1	Smith	12,735
12 November 1927	West Ham United (A)	0–2		18,189
19 November 1927	Derby County (H)	4–4	L. Davies (2), W. Davies, Matson	6,606
26 November 1927	Sheffield United (A)	4–3	McLachlan (2), L. Davies, Ferguson	22,999
3 December 1927	Aston Villa (H)	2–1	Ferguson (2)	14,264
10 December 1927	Sunderland (A)	2–0	Thirlaway, L. Davies	16,450
17 December 1927	Bury (H)	0–1		11,961
24 December 1927	Burnley (A)	1–2	Thirlaway	13,158
26 December 1927	Everton (A)	1–2	Wake	56,305
27 December 1927	Everton (H)	2–0	L. Davies, Wake	25,387
31 December 1927	Bolton Wanderers (A)	1–2	Miles	15,745
7 January 1928	Sheffield Wednesday (H)	1–1	Ferguson	9,208
21 January 1928	Middlesbrough (A)	2–1	Thirlaway, Ferguson	21,728
4 February 1928	Newcastle United (A)	0–2		26,439
11 February 1928	Huddersfield Town (H)	4–0	L. Davies, Wadsworth (o.g.), Thirlaway (2)	21,073
22 February 1928	Birmingham (H)	2–1	Ferguson, McLachlan	10,758
25 February 1928	Manchester United (H)	2–0	L. Davies, Ferguson	15,579
3 March 1928	Portsmouth (A)	0–3		25,157
5 March 1928	Tottenham Hotspur (A)	0–1		6,250
10 March 1928	Leicester City (H)	3–0	Ferguson (2), McLachlan	13,178
17 March 1928	Liverpool (A)	2–1	L. Davies, Thirlaway	34,532
24 March 1928	West Ham United (H)	1–5	Ferguson	14,529
31 March 1928	Derby County (A)	1–7	Thirlaway	15,565
6 April 1928	Arsenal (A)	0–3		36,828
7 April 1928	Sheffield United (H)	2–2	McLachlan (2)	11,283
9 April 1928	Arsenal (H)	2–2	Smith, Wake	17,695
14 April 1928	Aston Villa (A)	1–3	McLachlan	22,428
21 April 1928	Sunderland (H)	3–1	Warren, L. Davies, McLachlan	10,268
28 April 1928	Bury (A)	0–3		13,375
5 May 1928	Burnley (H)	3–2	L. Davies (2), Warren	8,663

== Cup matches ==
=== FA Cup ===
Entering the competition as reigning holders, Cardiff began the defence of their title against Southampton on 14 January 1928. The Times noted that Southampton had a "reputation as a cup-fighting team" but Cardiff were considered heavy favourites for the tie. Their opponents lived up to their reputation as the game proved difficult for Cardiff before they secured a 2–1 win with goals from Ferguson and Len Davies. In the fourth round, Cardiff were drawn at home against fellow First Division side Liverpool. The match was played on 28 January in poor conditions; there were doubts ahead of kick-off as to whether the match would go ahead. Liverpool took the lead in the first half with a penalty given for handball, but McLachlan equalised for Cardiff two minutes later. In the second half, Cardiff took the lead in unusual circumstances when the Liverpool defence turned away from Jimmy Nelson's free-kick, which allowed the ball to roll tamely into the net past the unsighted goalkeeper. Liverpool came close to equalising late on but Cardiff progressed to the fifth round with a 2–1 win.

Victory over Liverpool resulted in an away tie against Nottingham Forest on 18 February in the fifth round. Ferguson gave Cardiff an early lead before Forest equalised from the penalty spot after a foul by Nelson. With the tie poised at 1–1, Forest scored a controversial winning goal as Cardiff protested that the ball had gone out of play for a goal kick immediately beforehand. The goal was given and Forest held on to win as Ferguson missed a late opportunity to equalise. The FA Cup trophy remained in Cardiff's possession until it was handed back to The Football Association on 5 March.

==== Match results ====
Key

- In result column, Cardiff City's score shown first
- H = Home match
- A = Away match
- N = Neutral venue
- pen. = Penalty kick
- o.g. = Own goal

Results

Date	Round	Opponents	Result	Goalscorers	Attendance
14 January 1928	Three	Southampton (H)	2–1	L. Davies, Ferguson	23,000
28 January 1928	Four	Liverpool (H)	2–1	McLachlan, Nelson	20,000
18 February 1928	Five	Nottingham Forest (A)	1–2	Ferguson	30,500

=== Welsh Cup ===
Cardiff were also the reigning holders of the Welsh Cup and began their defence of the trophy on 15 March 1928 against Oswestry Town. Despite resting some first team players, Cardiff recorded a comfortable 7–1 victory over their non-league opponents, with Len Davies scoring the club's only hat-trick of the campaign and Fred Castle and Smith each scoring a brace. In round six, Cardiff defeated local rivals Swansea Town 1–0 with Smith the goalscorer.

Rhyl were drawn as Cardiff's opponents for the semi-final and the two sides recorded a 2–2 draw on 18 April. The draw resulted in a replay being played a week later, with Cardiff overcoming their opponents with a 2–0 victory. In the final, Cardiff met Bangor at Farrar Road Stadium. Ferguson scored his second brace of the competition to ensure Cardiff retained the Welsh Cup with a 2–0 win.

==== Match results ====
Key

- In result column, Cardiff City's score shown first
- H = Home match
- A = Away match
- N = Neutral venue
- pen. = Penalty kick
- o.g. = Own goal

Results

Date	Round	Opponents	Result	Goalscorers	Attendance
15 March 1928	Five	Oswestry Town (A)	7–1	L. Davies (3), Castle (2), Smith (2)	4,000
2 April 1928	Six	Swansea Town (H)	1–0	Smith	10,000
18 April 1928	Semi-final	Rhyl (A)	2–2	Ferguson (2)	3,000
25 April 1928	Semi-final (replay)	Rhyl (A)	2–0	Wake, L. Davies	5,000
18 April 1928	Final	Bangor (A)	2–0	Ferguson (2)	11,000

=== FA Charity Shield ===
As winners of the FA Cup the previous season, Cardiff took part in the FA Charity Shield against amateur side Corinthians on 12 October 1927. The match was held at Stamford Bridge, the home ground of Chelsea. After a goalless first half, Corinthians took the lead through Gilbert Ashton and held the advantage until the 77th minute when Ferguson headed a cross from Thirlaway into the opposition net. With the momentum behind them, Cardiff continued to attack and they took the lead with three minutes of normal time remaining when Len Davies converted from a corner kick. As of August 2020, Cardiff remain the only Welsh side to have both won and competed in the competition.

==== Match results ====
Key

- In result column, Cardiff City's score shown first
- H = Home match
- A = Away match
- N = Neutral venue
- pen. = Penalty kick
- o.g. = Own goal

Results

Date	Opponents	Result	Goalscorers	Attendance
12 October 1927	Corinthians (N)	2–1	Ferguson, L. Davies	10,500

== Friendly ==
As winners of the FA Cup, Cardiff were invited to take part in a challenge match against the reigning Scottish Cup holders Celtic at Hampden Park. The Cardiff squad were described as "weary" by writer James Leighton heading into the game, having lost heavily to Huddersfield two days prior. Despite starting the stronger of the two sides, Celtic ultimately ran out 4–1 winners, with Curtis scoring Cardiff's goal.

=== Match results ===
Key

- In result column, Cardiff City's score shown first
- H = Home match
- A = Away match
- pen. = Penalty kick
- o.g. = Own goal

Results

Date	Opponents	Result	Goalscorers	Attendance
3 October 1927	Celtic (A)	1–4	Curtis	6,000

== Player details ==
Stewart used 24 players in all competitions during the campaign. McLachlan made more appearances than any other player, featuring in 50 matches in total. He was ever present in the league, playing all 42 matches, and missed only one senior game during the season, a 7–1 win over Oswestry in the Welsh Cup. Billy Hardy, Nelson and Thirlaway all fell one short of McLachlan, appearing in 49 matches. Four other players, Len Davies, Tom Farquharson, Keenor and Ferguson, appeared in more than 40 matches during the campaign. Jim Baillie and Jerry Murphy both made only one appearance during the season.

For the second consecutive season, Ferguson was the club's top goalscorer. He scored 25 times in all competitions, with 18 in the league, 2 in the FA Cup, 4 in the Welsh Cup and 1 in the Charity Shield. Len Davies also passed 20 goals in the campaign, scoring 21 in total, and was the only player to score a hat-trick during the season in a 7–1 win over Oswestry. McLachlan and Thirlaway were the only other players to reach double figures, scoring 12 and 11 respectively. Eight other players scored at least once during the season, as well as one opposition own goal.

=== Player statistics ===
Player	Position	First Division		FA Cup		Welsh Cup		FA Charity Shield		Total	
Player	Position	Apps	Goals	Apps	Goals	Apps	Goals	Apps	Goals	Apps	Goals
Jim Baillie	HB	1	0	0	0	0	0	0	0	1	0
George Blackburn	HB	11	0	1	0	1	0	1	0	14	0
Fred Castle	FW	1	0	0	0	1	2	0	0	2	2
Ernie Curtis	FW	20	3	0	0	0	0	1	0	21	3
Len Davies	FW	37	15	3	1	5	4	1	1	46	21
Willie Davies	FW	5	1	0	0	1	0	0	0	6	1
Tom Farquharson	GK	37	0	3	0	5	0	1	0	46	0
Hughie Ferguson	FW	32	18	3	2	4	4	1	1	40	25
Billy Hardy	HB	41	0	3	0	4	0	1	0	49	0
Joe Hillier	GK	5	0	0	0	0	0	0	0	5	0
Sam Irving	FW	20	0	2	0	0	0	1	0	23	0
John Jennings	HB	19	0	1	0	5	0	0	0	25	0
Fred Keenor	DF	36	0	3	0	5	0	1	0	45	0
Frank Matson	FW	4	1	0	0	0	0	0	0	4	1
George McLachlan	FW	42	11	3	1	4	0	1	0	50	12
Albert Miles	FW	3	1	0	0	0	0	0	0	3	1
Jerry Murphy	FW	1	0	0	0	0	0	0	0	1	0
Jimmy Nelson	DF	41	0	3	1	4	0	1	0	49	1
Tom Sloan	HB	12	0	1	0	3	0	0	0	16	0
Potter Smith	FW	12	3	0	0	4	3	0	0	16	6
Billy Thirlaway	FW	40	11	3	0	5	0	1	0	49	11
Harry Wake	HB	17	3	3	0	3	1	0	0	23	1
Fred Warren	HB	4	2	0	0	0	0	0	0	4	2
Tom Watson	DF	21	0	1	0	1	0	0	0	23	0

FW = Forward, HB = Halfback, GK = Goalkeeper, DF = Defender

== Aftermath ==
Although the sixth-place finish during the campaign was the Cardiff's highest finish in the First Division since the 1923–24 season, the 1927–28 campaign is generally regarded as the start of the club's downfall that would see them relegated the following season and culminate with relegation to the Third Division South within three years. In his 1999 book C'mon City! A Hundred Years of the Bluebirds, chronicling the history of the club, Grahame Lloyd wrote that although the season "represented a reasonable return. In truth, it masked a dangerous lurch towards mediocrity." The failure to replace first team players with sufficient quality and an ageing core of the squad are both cited by historians as factors in the club's eventual downturn.

At the end of the season Cardiff organised a tour of Denmark for the side, playing friendlies against Aarhus, Aalborg and an Odense XI. They won all three matches, conceding only a single goal in the process. During their final match in Odense an opposition player, Creutz Jensen, impressed the Cardiff delegation so much that they immediately signed him on a free transfer. However, Jensen was denied a work permit by the Ministry of Labour and the move, which would have seen him become the first foreign player in the club's history, subsequently collapsed.
