= Barrie Hillier =

English footballer

Personal information
- Full name: Barry Guy Hillier
- Date of birth: 8 April 1936
- Place of birth: Redcar, England
- Date of death: 10 December 2016 (aged 80)
- Place of death: Hampshire, England
- Position: Defender

Senior career*
Years	Team	Apps	(Gls)
1953–1959	Southampton	9	(0)
- → Chester (loan)
1959–1960	Poole Town		
1960–1963	Dorchester Town		
- Andover
- * Club domestic league appearances and goals

Barry Guy Hillier (8 April 1936 – 10 December 2016) was an English footballer who played as a left-back.

== Career ==
In 1953, Hillier signed for Southampton, initially playing in the reserves. During Hillier's time in the reserves at the club, he was called up for National Service. Being stationed in Rhyl, Hillier played amateur football for Chester. On 14 September 1957, following his return to Southampton, Hillier made his debut for the club in a 5–0 win against Queens Park Rangers. In 1959, Hillier was released by Southampton, subsequently joining Southern League club Poole Town, managed by ex-Southampton full-back Mike Keeping.

Following a spell at Poole, Hillier played for Dorchester Town and Andover.

== Personal life ==
Hiller's father, Joe, was a Welsh goalkeeper who played for Cardiff City and Middlesbrough.
