= Jim Baillie =

Scottish footballer

Personal information
- Full name: James Baillie
- Date of birth: 8 June 1902
- Place of birth: Hamilton, Scotland
- Position: Right half

Youth career
- Wishaw

Senior career*
Years	Team	Apps	(Gls)
- Derry Celtic
1926–1930	Cardiff City	5	(0)
1930–1931	Fulham		
1931–1932	Dundee United	5	(0)
- * Club domestic league appearances and goals

James Baillie (8 June 1902 – date of death unknown) was a Scottish professional footballer.

== Career ==
Born in Hamilton, Baillie played for local youth side Wishaw before joining Derry Celtic. In 1926, he joined Football League First Division side Cardiff City. However, with several established players such as Fred Keenor and Harry Wake in the side, Baillie struggled to break into the first team. He made his professional debut on 25 September 1926 in a 2–0 defeat to Manchester United but made only three further appearances during the 1926–27 season. The following year, he made just one appearance during a 5–1 defeat to West Ham United, his last appearance for the first team.

He joined Fulham in 1930 before returning to Scotland a year later and signing for Dundee United. He made his debut for the club in a 2–2 draw with Falkirk on 7 November 1931, making four further appearances for the club before being released in 1932.
