= Donald Farquharson (athlete) =

Canadian athlete (1925–2000)

Donald Farquharson (3 April 1925 – 21 July 2000) was an accomplished sportsman. He was the son of Tom Farquharson the former Irish footballer who played as a goalkeeper for Cardiff City. He emigrated from Cardiff to Canada after the Second World War and in the 1970s became one of the early proponents of Masters athletics.

Farquharson died 21 July 2000 and various elements of the Ontario Masters Athletics meetings were named in his honour.
