= Ralph Williams (footballer) =

Welsh footballer

Personal information
- Full name: Ralph Shipley Williams
- Date of birth: 2 October 1905
- Place of birth: Aberaman, Wales
- Date of death: 1 March 1985 (aged 79)
- Place of death: Aberaman, Wales
- Position: Centre forward

Senior career*
Years	Team	Apps	(Gls)
- Aberaman Athletic
- Aberdare Athletic
1924–1925	Brentford	7	(1)
- Aberaman Athletic
- Poole Town
1927	Chesterfield	31	(15)
- Manchester Central
- Colwyn Bay United
1929–1931	Cardiff City	30	(17)
1931–1932	Crewe Alexandra	13	(16)
1932	Rochdale	8	(1)
1932–1933	Southport	12	(3)
- Merthyr Town
- Lovell's Athletic
- Aberdare Town
- Bangor City
- Rhyl
- Aberdare Town
- * Club domestic league appearances and goals

Ralph Shipley Williams (2 October 1905 – 1 March 1985) was a Welsh professional footballer who played as a centre forward in the Football League for a number of clubs, most notably Chesterfield and Cardiff City.

== Career statistics ==
Appearances and goals by club, season and competition
Club	Season	League			FA Cup		Other		Total	
Club	Season	Division	Apps	Goals	Apps	Goals	Apps	Goals	Apps	Goals
Brentford	1924–25	Third Division South	7	1	0	0	―		7	1
Chesterfield	1927–28	Third Division North	31	15	1	0	―		32	15
Cardiff City	1929–30	Second Division	16	11	―		―		16	11
Cardiff City	1930–31	Second Division	14	6	2	0	0	0	16	6
Cardiff City	Total		30	17	2	0	0	0	32	17
Rochdale	1932–33	Third Division North	8	1	―		0	0	8	1
Southport	1932–33	Third Division North	12	3	2	0	1 (Note: Appearance in Lancashire Senior Cup)	0	15	3
Career total			88	37	5	0	1	0	94	37
