= Jimmy McGrath =

English footballer

Personal information
- Full name: James McGrath
- Date of birth: 4 March 1907
- Place of birth: Washington, Tyne and Wear, England
- Date of death: 17 October 1950 (aged 43)
- Place of death: Ryhope, England
- Height: 5 ft 9 in (1.75 m)
- Positions: Left-half; right winger

Youth career
- Washington Colliery

Senior career*
Years	Team	Apps	(Gls)
1928–1932	Cardiff City	33	(0)
1932–1934	Port Vale	66	(11)
1934	Notts County	11	(3)
1934–1938	Bradford Park Avenue	83	(2)
Total		193	(16)
- * Club domestic league appearances and goals

James McGrath (4 March 1907 – 17 October 1950) was an English footballer. A speedy and crafty player, he played at left-half and on the right wing. He began his career in 1928 at Cardiff City before switching to Port Vale in May 1932. He was transferred to Notts County in June 1934 and later moved on to Bradford Park Avenue.

== Career ==
McGrath played for Washington Colliery before joining Cardiff City in 1928. The "Bluebirds" suffered relegation out of the First Division following a last-place finish in 1928–29. They posted an eighth-place finish in the Second Division in 1929–30 before suffering another relegation in 1930–31 with another last-place finish. Cardiff finished in ninth place in the Third Division South in 1931–32. In his four seasons at Ninian Park, McGrath featured in 33 league games. He returned to the Second Division when he signed with Port Vale in May 1932. His debut came on 9 May at the humiliating 7–0 Potteries derby defeat to Stoke City in the North Staffordshire Infirmary Cup final. He scored his first goal for the club on 3 December 1932, in a 2–1 defeat to Oldham Athletic at Boundary Park. He scored a total of eight goals in 29 appearances in the 1932–33 season, getting on the scoresheet against Stoke City at the Old Recreation Ground and against Manchester United at Old Trafford. He scored three goals in 39 games in the 1933–34 campaign. He was transferred to league rivals Notts County in June 1934. He later moved on to Bradford Park Avenue, eventually joining the training staff there.

== Later life ==
McGrath took up employment at Ryhope Colliery after the Second World War. He died suddenly at the site on 17 October 1950.

== Career statistics ==
Appearances and goals by club, season and competition
Club	Season	League			FA Cup		Total	
Club	Season	Division	Apps	Goals	Apps	Goals	Apps	Goals
Cardiff City	1928–29	First Division	1	0	0	0	1	0
Cardiff City	1929–30	Second Division	5	0	2	0	7	0
Cardiff City	1930–31	Second Division	14	0	2	0	16	0
Cardiff City	1931–32	Third Division South	13	0	0	0	13	0
Cardiff City	Total		33	0	4	0	37	0
Port Vale	1932–33	Second Division	28	8	1	0	29	8
Port Vale	1933–34	Second Division	38	3	1	0	39	3
Port Vale	Total		66	11	2	0	68	11
Notts County	1934–35	Second Division	11	3	0	0	11	3
Bradford Park Avenue	1934–35	Second Division	25	2	1	0	26	2
Bradford Park Avenue	1935–36	Second Division	35	0	6	0	41	0
Bradford Park Avenue	1936–37	Second Division	19	0	0	0	19	0
Bradford Park Avenue	1937–38	Second Division	4	0	0	0	4	0
Bradford Park Avenue	Total		83	2	7	0	90	2
Career total			193	16	13	0	206	16
