= Don Bird =

English footballer

Personal information
- Full name: Donald William Carlton Bird
- Date of birth: 5 January 1908
- Place of birth: Newton Abbot, Devon, England
- Date of death: 1987 (aged 78–79)
- Height: 5 ft 8 1/2 in (1.74 m)
- Position: Outside left

Senior career*
Years	Team	Apps	(Gls)
1929–1931	Cardiff City	13	(4)
1931–1932	Bury	0	(0)
1932–1934	Torquay United	74	(15)
1934–1935	Derby County	5	(2)
1935–1936	Sheffield United	13	(3)
1936–1937	Southend United	10	(1)
- * Club domestic league appearances and goals

Donald William Carlton Bird (5 January 1908 – 1987) was an English professional footballer who played at outside left. Born in Newton Abbot, he made over 100 appearances in the Football League.

== Career ==
Although born in Devon, Bird came to prominence playing in Wales for local side Llandrindod Wells, from where he joined Cardiff City in 1929, scoring on his home debut in a 5–1 win over Bury on the final day of the 1929–30 season. Unable to oust Walter Robbins from the side, he later moved to Bury, but failed to make their league side and joined Torquay United in 1932 as a replacement for Harry Waller.

He later had spells with Derby County and Sheffield United before finishing his league career with Southend United.

== After football ==
After his playing career was ended by the outbreak of the Second World War, Bird served as a sergeant in an Auxiliary Unit in his local area.
