= Tom Wilson (footballer, born 1902) =

English footballer (1902–1992)

Personal information
- Full name: Thomas Henry Wilson
- Date of birth: 9 December 1902
- Place of birth: Lambeth, London, England
- Date of death: 1992 (aged 89–90)
- Place of death: Enfield, London, England
- Position: Half-back

Youth career
- Walthamstow Avenue

Senior career*
Years	Team	Apps	(Gls)
1924–1926	Charlton Athletic	15	(4)
1926–1930	Wigan Borough	108	(4)
1930–1931	Cardiff City	1	(0)
1931–1932	Charlton Athletic	18	(0)
1932–1936	Southend United	12	(0)
- * Club domestic league appearances and goals

Thomas Henry Wilson (9 December 1902 – September 1992) was an English footballer who appeared in The Football League for Charlton Athletic, Wigan Borough, Cardiff City and Southend United.
