= Joe Hillier =

English footballer

Personal information
- Full name: Ernest John Guy Hillier
- Date of birth: 10 April 1907
- Place of birth: Eastleigh, Hampshire, England
- Date of death: 1979 (aged 71–72)
- Height: 6 ft 0 in (1.83 m)
- Position: Goalkeeper

Senior career*
Years	Team	Apps	(Gls)
- Bridgend Town
1926–1927	Swansea Town	0	(0)
1927–1930	Cardiff City	9	(0)
1930–1936	Middlesbrough	63	(0)
1936–?	Newport County		
- * Club domestic league appearances and goals

Ernest John Guy Hillier (10 April 1907 – 1979) was a Welsh professional footballer who played as a goalkeeper. During his career, he made over 70 appearances in the Football League during spells with Cardiff City, Middlesbrough and Newport County.

== Career ==
Born in Eastleigh, Hampshire, Hillier was working as a butcher while playing for local amateur side Bridgend Town when he was offered a trial with Football League side Swansea Town. He was retained by the club as an amateur for the 1926–27 season but never played for the first team. The following year, he signed for Swansea's local rivals Cardiff City. After impressing for the club's reserve side, he made his professional debut in a 2–0 victory over Everton in December 1927.

He made four further appearances during the season and another four the following season as he acted as understudy to first choice goalkeeper Tom Farquharson. In January 1930, he was allowed to join Middlesbrough in a triple transfer with teammates John Jennings and Fred Warren. As part of the deal, Cardiff agreed to a clause that would see the club receive a further £250 if both Hillier and Jennings played in twenty league matches for Middlesbrough. When both players reached the tally in May 1933, Cardiff issued a request for the money to be paid but received a cheque for just £50. When Cardiff queried the payment, Middlesbrough produced the agreement paper which included only a bonus of £50, an error that was later revealed to have been made by former Cardiff manager Fred Stewart who had mistakenly written the wrong figure. Cardiff appealed to the Football League, but their claim was dismissed.

Hillier went on to make 63 league appearances for Middlesbrough before finishing his professional career with Newport County.

== Later life ==
After retiring from football, Hillier retired to the town of Gosport where he became a publican. His son Barrie was also a professional footballer, playing nine league matches for Southampton during the 1957–58 season.
