= Stan Davies (footballer) =

Welsh footballer and manager

Personal information
- Full name: Stanley Charles Davies
- Date of birth: 24 April 1898
- Place of birth: Chirk, Wales
- Date of death: 17 January 1972 (aged 73)
- Place of death: Birmingham, England
- Height: 1.79 m (5 ft 10 1/2 in)
- Positions: Inside forward; centre forward

Senior career*
Years	Team	Apps	(Gls)
1919	Rochdale		
1919–1921	Preston North End	24	(11)
1921	Everton	20	(9)
1921–1927	West Bromwich Albion	147	(77)
1927–1928	Birmingham	14	(2)
1928–1929	Cardiff City	14	(2)
1929–1930	Rotherham United	1	(0)
1930	Barnsley	1	(0)

International career
1920–1930	Wales	18	(5)

Managerial career
- 1929–1930: Rotherham United
- * Club domestic league appearances and goals

Stanley Charles Davies MM (24 April 1898 – 17 January 1972) was a Welsh professional footballer who played as a forward.

== Early life ==
Davies was born in Chirk, working as a coal miner for a year as a teenager before becoming a footballer. He fought in World War I, serving with the Royal Welch Fusiliers on the Western Front and attained the rank of sergeant. Davies was wounded during the Battle of Cambrai and later transferred to the Army Signalling School, being awarded the Military Medal and the Croix de Guerre for his service.

== Career ==
Having played for his hometown side Chirk prior to World War I, Davies turned professional with Rochdale in January 1919 but just three months later joined Preston North End for £800. After two years with Preston, Davies moved to Everton on 29 January 1921 for a fee of £4000, a club record for Preston at the time. He made his debut on 5 February 1921. His final match was on 5 November that year, and he then moved to West Bromwich Albion.

Later in his career he played for Birmingham, Cardiff City, Rotherham United (as player-manager) and Barnsley. He died in Birmingham in 1972.
