= Jack Jennings (English footballer) =

English footballer

Personal information
- Date of birth: 27 August 1902
- Place of birth: Platt Bridge, Wigan, England
- Date of death: 14 April 1997 (aged 94)
- Place of death: Northampton, England
- Height: 5 ft 9 in (1.75 m)
- Position: Right half

Senior career*
Years	Team	Apps	(Gls)
1923–1925	Wigan Borough		
1925–1930	Cardiff City	94	(0)
1930–1936	Middlesbrough		
1936–1937	Preston North End		
1937–1945	Bradford City	28	(0)
Total		126	(0)
- * Club domestic league appearances and goals

John Jennings (27 August 1902 – 14 April 1997) was an English professional footballer who played as a right half.

== Career ==
Born in Platt Bridge, Jennings had worked as a railway fireman before beginning his footballing career with Wigan Borough. He joined First Division side Cardiff City in 1925, making his debut in a 3–2 defeat to Birmingham City on 10 October 1925. However, due to competition from several established players including Billy Hardy and Harry Wake, he made just one further appearance during the 1925–26 season in a 0–0 draw with Arsenal on 31 February 1926. The following season, Jennings did not make an appearance until the final three months of the season, being handed a chance at full back following an injury to Tom Watson, but impressed enough to eventually displace Watson from the side. He became a permanent fixture in the first team at Ninian Park, featuring in every league match that the club played for nearly two years between February 1928 and January 1930, before he was sold to Middlesbrough as part of a triple transfer that included Joe Hillier and Fred Warren.

Jennings spent several years as club captain at Middlesbrough, eventually relinquishing the role to Tom Griffiths following his arrival from Bolton Wanderers in 1933, and was selected in an FA XI for a tour of Canada in 1931. He signed for Bradford City in February 1937 from Preston North End, leaving the club in 1945 to become a trainer at Northampton Town. During his time with Bradford City he made 28 appearances in the Football League, and 3 appearances in the FA Cup.

He later worked as a coach for the England national amateur football team and the Great Britain Olympic football team, working as a trainer for Norman Creek, Charles Hughes and Walter Winterbottom between 1952 and 1971. He also worked as a trainer for player-manager Jimmy Armfield on an FA XI tour of Tahiti, New Zealand, Singapore, Hong Kong and Thailand in 1969.

== Sources ==
- Frost, Terry (1988). Bradford City A Complete Record 1903–1988. Breedon Books Sport. ISBN 0-907969-38-0.
- Hayes, Dean (2006). The Who's Who of Cardiff City. Breedon Books. ISBN 1-85983-462-0.
- Shepherd, Richard (2002). The Definitive: Cardiff City F.C. SoccerData Publications. ISBN 1-899468-17-X.
