= 1927 FA Charity Shield =

- Event: FA Charity Shield
Cardiff City	Corinthians
(Wales)	(England)
2	1
- Date: 12 October 1927
- Venue: Stamford Bridge, London

The 1927 Football Association Charity Shield was the 14th FA Charity Shield, an annual English association football match. The match, held at Stamford Bridge on 12 October 1927, was contested by Cardiff City, who beat Arsenal in the final of the 1926–27 FA Cup, and amateur side Corinthian. This was the first FA Charity Shield appearance for both sides, although Corinthian had previous won the Sheriff of London Charity Shield on three occasions.

After a goalless first half, Corinthian went ahead early in the second half with a goal from Gilbert Ashton. There were many attacks from both sides, but it took until the 77th minute before Cardiff equalised with a header by Hughie Ferguson after a series of passing plays. With only a few minutes remaining on the clock, Cardiff won a corner kick and from the cross, and Len Davies tapped the ball into the net to put them ahead. The game finished with the score two goals to one in Cardiff City's favour. Several charities benefited from the proceeds of the match, including the King Edward VII's Hospital for Officers and the National Institute for the Blind.

== Background ==
The FA Charity Shield was founded in 1908 as a successor to the Sheriff of London Charity Shield. It was a contest between the respective champions of the Football League and Southern League, and then by 1913 teams of amateur and professional players. At a Football Association Council meeting on 22 April 1927, it was decided that the following season's Charity Shield match should be played between the winner of the 1926–27 FA Cup and the amateur team Corinthians. This would mark the first occasion Corinthians would play in the competition, they had previously won the Sheriff of London Charity Shield on three occasions.

Cardiff City qualified for the 1927 FA Charity Shield as winners of the 1926–27 FA Cup. They defeated Arsenal by one goal to nil, with the only goal of the game coming from Hughie Ferguson. It was the club's first FA Cup victory, and the only time that the trophy had been won by a club outside of England. A few months after Cardiff's victory, the match between them and Corinthians for the FA Charity Shield was set to take place at Stamford Bridge on 12 October. Corinthian announced their team a few days prior to the game, though goalkeeper Benjamin Howard Baker was subsequently replaced by A.M. Russell, who normally played for Cambridge University A.F.C. Due to an injury to Tom Watson, Billy Hardy was switched to the other wing in defence for Cardiff City.

== Match ==
=== Summary ===
The Corinthians gained a corner kick early on, and Cardiff cleared. This was followed up by a further attack by the amateurs, but R.G. Jenkins' shot went straight to Tom Farquharson in the Cardiff goal. Cardiff attacked twice in quick succession; both chances were squandered. A.H. Chadder, Frank Hartley and Jenkins moved up-field for Corinthian with some passing movement and played the ball through for Claude Ashton, but he shot wide of the post. Three corners followed for Cardiff, which were each stopped by Russell in goal for Corinthian stopped each chance. A few minutes later Len Davies headed the ball down to the feet of Ferguson, but the Cardiff player fired the ball wide of the goal despite being only a few feet away from the goal line. Just before half time, Cardiff won a direct free kick; Fred Keenor hammered the ball into a wall of Corinthian players.

The second half began with a speedy Cardiff attack. Corinthian countered, resulting in shots from both Claude and Gilbert Ashton within 15 seconds of each other. Another Cardiff attack resulted in Ferguson missing the goal from a few feet out once again. After four minutes in the second half, Corinthians attacked once more. Fred Ewer played it down the left wing to Kenneth Hegan, who passed it into the centre towards Gilbert Ashton, who fired it past Farquharson. Shortly after the restart, Billy Thirlaway appeared to be about to score a certain goal for Cardiff, but was charged down by Russell. Further chances came in rapid succession; for Cardiff, Ferguson struck the crossbar with one shot; then for Corinthian, Claude Ashton passed forward to Jenkins, who struck it wide of an open goal mouth. Hegan sent the ball over the bar, and then a further shot by Claude Ashton was charged down.

In the 77th minute, Keenor, Ferguson and Davies passed the ball among themselves before playing it wide to Thirlaway. Ferguson ran to the centre and the ball was crossed towards him. Ferguson leapt and headed the ball into the net to equalise for Cardiff. It looked like Cardiff were about to go ahead, however, a last minute tackle by Alfred Bower prevented Ernie Curtis from scoring, giving the Welsh team another corner. The ball was fired towards the goal mouth, and was shot into the goal from close range by Davies putting Cardiff ahead. The final two attacks of the game were both by Cardiff, with Russell saving a header by Ferguson and then Curtis firing the ball over the crossbar.

=== Details ===
12 October 1927

Cardiff City (Wales)	2–1	(England) Corinthians
Ferguson 77'; Davies 87'		G. Ashton 49'

Stamford Bridge, London

Cardiff City	Corinthians

GK	(Republic of Ireland) Tom Farquharson
DF	(Scotland) James Nelson
DF	(England) Billy Hardy
MF	(Wales) Fred Keenor (c)
MF	(England) George Blackburn
MF	(Northern Ireland) Sam Irving
FW	(Wales) Ernie Curtis
FW	(Scotland) George McLachlan
FW	(Scotland) Hughie Ferguson
FR	(Wales) Len Davies
FL	(England) Billy Thirlaway
Manager:
(England) Fred Stewart

GK	(England) A.M. Russell
DF	(England) Arthur Knight
DF	(England) Alfred Bower
MF	(England) Tommy Whewell
MF	(England) A.H. Chadder
MF	(England) Fred Ewer
FW	(England) R.G. Jenkins
FW	(England) Gilbert Ashton
FW	(England) Claude Ashton
FR	(England) Frank Hartley
FL	(England) Kenneth Hegan

== Post-match ==
The match raised money for several charities. King Edward VII's Hospital for Officers received £210; National Institute for the Blind, £52 10s; Newspaper Press Fund, £52 10s; National Institute of Journalist's Orphans, £52 10s; London Lock Hospital, £52 10s; Prince of Wales General Hospital, £52 10s; Sheffield Royal Infirmary, £52 10s; Railway Benevolent Institution, £25; and the Surgical Aid Society received £25. A further sum of £210 was given to several Welsh based charities.

Corinthian never played in another FA Charity Shield, although they would later be runner-up in a resurrected Sheriff of London's Charity Shield, first to Arsenal in 1931 and in 1932, and then to Tottenham Hotspur in 1934. The club ceased to exist in 1939, when they merged with fellow amateur team Casuals to form the Corinthian-Casuals, which still plays today. The format of the FA Charity Shield changed several further times over the following decades, and in 1974 it was moved to August to become the opening match of each year's Football League season, and played between the winner of the FA Cup and the most senior league, now the Premier League.

Cardiff City is yet to return to the FA Charity Shield, which was renamed the FA Community Shield in 2002. However, between 2001 and 2006, the match was held at Cardiff's Millennium Stadium while the new Wembley Stadium was under construction. The closest Cardiff City has come so far to returning to the match was in 2008 when they reached the FA Cup Final once more, but lost by a goal to nil against Portsmouth.

== See also ==
- 1927–28 Football League
- 1927–28 FA Cup
