= William Shaw (footballer) =

English footballer

Personal information
- Date of birth: 3 October 1897
- Place of birth: Swinton, England
- Height: 5 ft 10 1/2 in (1.79 m)
- Position: Forward

Senior career*
Years	Team	Apps	(Gls)
–1921	Frickley Colliery		
1921–1923	Bradford City	15	(4)
1923–1924	Chesterfield	2	(?)
1924–1925	Scunthorpe United		
1925–1926	Southend United	39	(21)
1926–1928	Gainsborough Trinity		
1928–1928	Cardiff City		
1928–19??	Gainsborough Trinity		
- * Club domestic league appearances and goals

William Shaw (born 3 October 1897) was an English professional footballer who played as a forward. He scored 21 goals in 39 appearances in the Football League playing for Southend United in the 1925–1926 season.

== Playing career ==
Shaw was born in Swinton, and began his football career with Frickley Colliery, before turning professional with Bradford City in 1921. He spent two seasons with Bradford before moving to Chesterfield in 1923 where he only made two first team appearances. Before the 1924–25 season he moved again, joining Scunthorpe United for one season. In 1925 he moved to Southend United, netting 18 league goals and 21 in total for the season but moved again at the end of the season to Gainsborough Trinity where he scored 70 league goals in one season, setting a Midland League record. In 1928 he moved yet again, to Cardiff City, but returned to Gainsborough in the same season.
