= Idris Miles =

Welsh footballer

Personal information
- Full name: Idris Miles
- Date of birth: 2 August 1908
- Place of birth: Neath, Wales
- Date of death: 1983 (aged 74–75)
- Place of death: Dudley, England
- Height: 5 ft 7 in (1.70 m)
- Position: Outside forward

Senior career*
Years	Team	Apps	(Gls)
1930–1931	Cardiff City	3	(0)
1931–1932	Yeovil and Petters United		(4)
1932–1934	Leicester City	7	(1)
1934–1937	Clapton Orient	73	(6)
1937	Exeter City	7	(0)
1937–?	Worcester City		
- * Club domestic league appearances and goals

Idris Miles (2 August 1908 — 1983) was a Welsh professional footballer who played as an outside forward.

== Career ==
After being spotted playing local amateur football, Miles joined Football League side Cardiff City in October 1930. He made his professional debut for the club in the same month, playing in a 1–1 draw with Nottingham Forest but appeared in only two further matches before being released the following year. He joined non-league side Yeovil and Petters where he scored seven goals during his spell with the side.

In 1932, he returned to the Football League with Leicester City, scoring on his debut in a 2–2 draw with Everton on 22 October 1932. He made seven appearances for the club during his first season but two successive broken collarbones meant he never played for the side again before being released in 1934. He subsequently joined Clapton Orient where he enjoyed the most consistent portion of his career, making over 70 appearances in all competitions during a three-year spell. He later played for Exeter City and Worcester City.
