= Potter Smith =

English footballer (1901–1978)

Personal information
- Full name: Thomas Potter Smith
- Date of birth: July 1901
- Place of birth: Newcastle upon Tyne, England
- Date of death: 1 September 1978 (aged 77)
- Place of death: Brighton, England
- Height: 5 ft 9 in (1.75 m)
- Positions: Inside left; left half

Senior career*
Years	Team	Apps	(Gls)
19??–1922	St Peter's Albion		
1922–1923	Merthyr Town	18	(6)
1923–1924	Hull City	8	(2)
1924–1925	Hartlepools United	30	(7)
1925–1926	Merthyr Town	14	(4)
1926–1929	Cardiff City	42	(7)
1929–1937	Brighton & Hove Albion	281	(40)
1937–1938	Crystal Palace	0	(0)
1938–19??	Gloucester City		
- * Club domestic league appearances and goals

Thomas Potter Smith (July 1901 – 1 September 1978) was an English professional footballer who made nearly 400 appearances in the Football League playing as an inside left or left half for Merthyr Town (two spells), Hull City, Hartlepools United, Cardiff City and Brighton & Hove Albion, where he spent the majority of his career.

== Life and career ==
Smith was born in Newcastle upon Tyne. He played local football for St Peter's Albion before beginning a tour of the Football League. After single seasons with Merthyr Town, Hull City, Hartlepools United and Merthyr Town again, before joining Cardiff City in 1929, where he spent three seasons disrupted by injury. In 1929, he signed for Brighton & Hove Albion, where he established himself as a first-team regular, averaging 40 league matches a season over an eight-year spell. After a season with Crystal Palace without a league appearance, he moved into non-league football with Gloucester City, where he acted as player-coach. Smith died in Brighton in 1978 at the age of 77.
