= Albert Valentine =

English footballer

Personal information
- Full name: Albert Finch Valentine
- Date of birth: 3 June 1907
- Place of birth: Higher Ince, England
- Date of death: 12 March 1990 (aged 82)
- Place of death: Billinge, Wigan, England
- Height: 5 ft 7 1/2 in (1.71 m)
- Position: Forward

Senior career*
Years	Team	Apps	(Gls)
1928?–1929?	Southport	21	(17)
1929?–1930	Cardiff City	16	(3)
1931?	Wigan Borough	12	(2)
1932?	Chester	2	(1)
1932?	Crewe Alexandra	5	(2)
1933–1934	Macclesfield Town	42	(70)
1934–1937	Halifax Town	114	(89)
1937	Stockport County	0	(0)
1938	Accrington Stanley	7	(1)
1938	Doncaster Rovers	4	(3)
- * Club domestic league appearances and goals

Albert Finch Valentine (3 June 1907 – 12 March 1990) was a footballer who played as a forward in England and Wales during the 1920s and 1930s.

== Early career ==
He was with Wigan Borough F.C. in 1931, and played for them on 24 October, their last game before resigning from The Football League.

After Wigan he played for Chester and Crewe Alexandra, before joining Macclesfield Town for the 1933/1934 season. In his single season with Macclesfield he scored 82 league and cup goals, and he still holds the Macclesfield record for most goals in a season

== Halifax Town ==
He joined Halifax Town for a fee of £500 from Macclesfield Town, and scored on his league debut for Halifax on 25 August 1934 in the 2–1 victory over Mansfield Town at The Shay. The highpoint of his first season was on 9 March 1936 when bagged 5 goals in the 6–2 home victory over New Brighton. Over the next two seasons he scored 4 goals in a game on 2 occasions, against Oldham Athletic and Rotherham United, and a hat-trick against Hartlepool United. During that first season, success on the field helped the club to make a rare profit totaling £1100. The much needed funds paid off a chunk of their £3500 debts.

Valentine was a prolific striker who still holds the club record for scoring the most league goals in a single season at Halifax Town.

In view of his achievements it was a surprise when Valentine was released from the club in 1937. He played his last game for Halifax on 1 May 1937 in their 4–1 defeat of Crewe Alexandra and in true fashion he signed off with 2 goals.
