= George McLachlan =

Scottish footballer (1901–1964)

Personal information
- Full name: George Hardie McLachlan
- Date of birth: 21 September 1901
- Place of birth: Glasgow, Scotland
- Date of death: September 1964 (aged 62–63)
- Place of death: Branford, Connecticut, United States
- Positions: Outside left; wing half

Youth career
- Crosshill Amateurs
- Parkhead
- Rutherglen Glencairn
- 1921–1922: Queen's Park
- 1922: Celtic

Senior career*
Years	Team	Apps	(Gls)
1922–1925	Clyde	62	(16)
1923–1924	→ King's Park (loan)	42	(3)
1925–1929	Cardiff City	140	(22)
1929–1933	Manchester United	110	(4)
1933–1934	Chester	29	(7)
1934–1935	Le Havre		

Managerial career
- 1934–1935: Le Havre
- 1935–1937: Queen of the South
- * Club domestic league appearances and goals

George Hardie McLachlan (21 September 1901 – September 1964) was a Scottish professional footballer and manager. He played for a number of amateur sides as a youth but began his professional career with Clyde in the Scottish Football League. He signed for Football League First Division side Cardiff City in 1925 for a fee of £2,000. He made more than 150 appearances for the side over four seasons in all competitions and was part of the team that won the 1927 FA Cup Final.

In 1929, he was sold to Manchester United where he was later appointed club captain. He later played for Chester in 1933 before being appointed manager of French side Le Havre in 1934, where he also briefly played. He returned to Scotland in 1935, becoming manager of Queen of the South. He spent two seasons in charge of the side and also led the team on a 1936 overseas tour of France. He left the club in March 1937 and took up employment as a draughtsman before emigrating to the United States.

== Club career ==
Born in Glasgow, McLachlan began his football career at Crosshill Amateurs before spending time with junior sides Parkhead and Rutherglen Glencairn. He later played for the junior teams of Scottish Football League sides Queens Park and Celtic. With the latter, he stayed for only two weeks before joining Clyde. During his amateur career, McLachlan also worked in a number of different jobs, including as a draughtsman and a sailor. McLachlan spent three years with the then Shawfield Stadium football club, interrupted by a short loan spell at King's Park Strollers.

=== Cardiff City ===
Many English Football League clubs were interested in signing McLachlan but, in November 1926, he joined for Football League First Division side Cardiff City for £2,000 (approximately £125,000 in 1925). He was persuaded to join City as his father was captain of a ship that regularly called at Cardiff docks. He was the third Scottish player to join the club in short succession, signing soon after Joe Cassidy and Hughie Ferguson. The trio cost a combined fee of £10,000, with Ferguson accounting for half. McLachlan made his debut for Cardiff alongside Ferguson as the attacking trio combined in a 5–2 victory over Leicester City. His first goal for the club came on 16 January 1926, when he scored Cardiff's goal in a 1–1 draw with Everton. He added a brace three weeks later during a 4–1 win over Blackburn Rovers, while the Daily Herald reported that "he delighted City's supporters with his fine form". However his season was ended when he suffered a broken leg in the return fixture against Leicester in March.

McLachlan returned from the injury on the opening day of the 1926–27 season, during which his side suffered a 4–3 defeat against Burnley. He was a regular in the first team for Cardiff, scoring 5 times in 38 league appearances. He also played in 5 of the club's 6 matches en route to reaching the 1927 FA Cup Final, scoring in the club's 2–0 victory over Darlington in the fourth round. Ahead of the final, the Daily Herald noted that McLachlan and Ernie Curtis had formed one of the "best wings in the First Division". Cardiff went on to win the final on 23 April 1927, defeating Arsenal 1–0 with a goal from Ferguson to become the only team from outside England to have won the competition in its history. McLachlan also helped the side complete a cup double by winning the Welsh Cup final two weeks later. He played in all five of the club's matches, scoring in the sixth and seventh rounds against Ebbw Vale and Barry Town United. In the final, Cardiff defeated Rhyl 2–0.

During the 1927–28 season, McLachlan was ever present in the league for Cardiff, appearing in all 42 matches and scoring 11 times. This included playing the final matches of the season as a centre forward in place of the injured Ferguson. McLachlan missed only one senior fixture for the club during the campaign, playing in 50 of the club's 51 matches in all competitions, and helped the side to victory in the 1927 FA Charity Shield by defeating amateur side Corinthian. Cardiff also retained the Welsh Cup by beating Bangor in the final.

The 1928–29 season saw a dramatic drop in results for Cardiff as they were relegated from the First Division after finishing bottom of the league. McLachlan had remained a regular starter during the first half of the campaign, but appeared sporadically in the second half. He was used in several positions, including as a half back. In the Second Division the following year, McLachlan was displaced by Fred Warren at the start of the campaign before being restored to the first team in late October 1929. He played in eight consecutive matches, scoring twice. His final match for the club was a 1–0 victory over Chelsea on 14 December. At the time of his departure, he had played 139 league games, scoring 22 goals during his time with Cardiff. While with the club, in 1928 he played for the Anglo-Scots against the Home-Scots in an international trial match at Firhill.

=== Later career ===
Cardiff received an offer from First Division side Manchester United for McLachlan in December 1929 for a fee of around £4,000 (approximately £260,000 in 2020). With the club short of funds, the offer was accepted. United's local rivals Manchester City had also submitted a competing bid for McLachlan after manager Peter Hodge had attended his last match for Cardiff. He made his debut for United in a 3–1 win over Leeds United on 21 December before scoring his first goal for the side a week later in a 5–0 victory over Newcastle United. He scored only one further goal during the campaign, but was described as having been "a great success" by The People. During his first year with United, an injury crisis at the club led McLachlan to switch from his usual outside left position to halfback. His performances resulted in him retaining the position on a regular basis and, at the start of the following season, he was appointed captain of the side.

His captaincy of the side started poorly as the team struggled in the First Division and were described by the Sheffield Independent as "the weakest team in the division" in September 1930. The Independent's assessment proved telling as United went on to finish bottom of the First Division, nine points behind their nearest rivals. McLachlan was ever-present during the season, appearing in all 42 league and 4 FA Cup matches, scoring twice. Upon the team's return to the Second Division, McLachlan gradually fell out of favour, appearing in 45 matches over the following two seasons. McLachlan scored four goals in 116 games for the Red Devils in his four years with the club.

In June 1933, McLachlan was appointed as a player-coach at Football League newcomers Chester, who were embarking on only their third Football League season. He left the club after a single year.

== Managerial career ==
McLachlan had a spell as player-manager with French second tier side Le Havre in 1934–35. He proved relatively successful with the side and led the league during the early stages of the season. Although initially intending only to coach at the club, McLachlan did play for the side during the campaign as a centre-half. He was offered a further contract, but his ambition was to manage a Scottish First Division side.

In 1935, McLachlan was the successful applicant out of almost one hundred who applied for the job as manager of top division Dumfries side, Queen of the South. His appointment was announced on 29 June. He was one of two applicants on the final shortlist, beating out Queen's Park trainer Bert Manderson who decided to remain with his side. In his first season, McLachlan led the club to a 15th-placed finish. At the end of the campaign, the club undertook an 11-game 1936 overseas tour and the Algiers invitational tournament. Queens returned with the trophy after beating Spanish side Racing Santander in the final.

The following season saw further struggles as the club finished in 18th position. On 22 March 1937, with five games remaining of the 1936–37 season, it was announced that McLachlan would be leaving the club on 30 March. The week was intended to allow the outgoing manager to offer advice on team building for the next season. Willie Ferguson was named as McLachlan's successor.

== Later life ==
McLachlan moved to Glasgow following his departure from Queen of the South and briefly reported on matches for The Sunday Post. He took up employment as a draughtsman for Babcock & Wilcox until 1947 when he took up a role with Farrel Corporation in Derby, Connecticut. McLachlan later became a French teacher in the Connecticut school system having picked up the language during his time with Le Havre. In 1964, he underwent exploratory surgery due to a persistent stomach complaint. The surgery discovered inoperable cancer and McLachlan died in September the same year at his home in Branford, Connecticut.

== Honours ==
Cardiff City

- FA Cup: 1926–27
- FA Charity Shield: 1927
