= Jimmy Munro (footballer, born 1905) =

Scottish footballer

Personal information
- Full name: James Auchterlonie Munro
- Date of birth: 20 May 1905
- Place of birth: Maryhill, Scotland
- Date of death: 1978 (aged 72–73)
- Position: Forward

Senior career*
Years	Team	Apps	(Gls)
1925–1929	St Johnstone	84	(55)
1928	→ Raith Rovers (loan)	3	(1)
1929	Cardiff City	14	(3)
1929–1930	Millwall	5	(2)
1930–1931	St Johnstone	6	(5)
- * Club domestic league appearances and goals

James Auchterlonie Munro (20 May 1905 – 1978) was a Scottish professional footballer who played as a forward.

== Career ==
Born in Glasgow, Munro developed a reputation as a prolific goalscorer while playing for St Johnstone, scoring 29 goals in 36 Scottish Division One games in 1926–27 which remains a club record and was only his second season as a senior. During his time with the Perth club, he was selected in a Scottish Football Association XI that travelled to Canada in 1927. In February 1929, Munro signed for Cardiff City as a replacement for Hughie Ferguson but was unable to replicate his form in the Football League. He was allowed to join Millwall soon after but struggled to break into the first team before returning to St Johnstone.
