= Jack McJennett =

Welsh footballer

Personal information
- Full name: John James McJennett
- Date of birth: 1906
- Place of birth: Cardiff, Wales
- Position: Full back

Senior career*
Years	Team	Apps	(Gls)
1929–1932	Cardiff City	5	(0)
1932–1933	Exeter City	0	(0)
- * Club domestic league appearances and goals

John James McJennett (1906 – after 1933) was a Welsh professional footballer who played as a full back. He made five appearances in the Football League for Cardiff City.
