= George Blackburn (footballer, born 1899) =

English footballer and manager

Personal information
- Full name: George Fredrick Blackburn
- Date of birth: 3 August 1899
- Place of birth: Halifax, England
- Date of death: 7 March 1957 (aged 57)
- Place of death: Cheltenham, England
- Height: 1.79 m (5 ft 10 in)
- Position: Left-half

Senior career*
Years	Team	Apps	(Gls)
1920–1926	Aston Villa	133	(1)
1926–1931	Cardiff City	115	(1)
1931–1932	Mansfield Town	14	(0)
1932–1934	Cheltenham Town		

International career
1924	England	1	(0)
- * Club domestic league appearances and goals

George Fredrick Blackburn (3 August 1899 – 7 March 1957) was a footballer in the early years of professional football in England. A left-half, he made over 250 appearances in the Football League during his career and won one cap for England in May 1924.

== Early life ==
Blackburn was born in Willesden and lived in Sandringham Road as a child, attending Pound Lane School. He was one of six children. His father was a brass finisher.

== Club career ==
Blackburn started his career at Hampstead Town, now known as Hendon. He signed for Aston Villa as an amateur in December 1920 and went on to play over 100 games, including their 2–0 defeat to Newcastle United in the 1924 FA Cup Final. He left Villa in June 1926 in a swap deal which saw Joe Nicholson join Villa and Blackburn join Cardiff City. He made his debut for Cardiff in a 4–3 defeat to Burnley and went on to establish himself in the side, although he was not included in the squad when the side won the FA Cup in 1927. His only goal for the club came in February 1930 when he scored against Blackpool during a 4–2 win. He left the club in 1931, along with Harry Wake, to join Mansfield Town. He later went to play and coach Cheltenham Town from 1932 to 1934.

== International career ==
Blackburn received his first call up to the England national side in April 1924 for a match against Scotland in the 1923–24 British Home Championship but did not feature for the side. One month later, on 17 May 1924, Blackburn made his one and only appearance for England in a 3–1 victory over France at Stade Pershing.

After his retirement, Blackburn became a trainer at Birmingham City during the Second World War and was handed control of the first team training duties by secretary-manager Bill Camkin toward the end of his spell in charge.

== Honours ==
Aston Villa

- FA Cup runner-up: 1923–24

Cardiff City

- FA Charity Shield: 1927
- Welsh Cup: 1927, 1930; runner-up 1929
