= Emlyn John =

Welsh footballer

Personal information
- Full name: Emlyn James John
- Date of birth: 4 March 1907
- Place of birth: Tonypandy, Wales
- Date of death: 1962 (aged 54–55)
- Place of death: Neath, Wales
- Position: Defender

Senior career*
Years	Team	Apps	(Gls)
- Mid Rhondda
1928–1932	Cardiff City	15	(0)
1932–1934	Newport County		
1934–1935	Barry Town United	14	(1)
- * Club domestic league appearances and goals

Emlyn James John (4 March 1907 – 1962) was a Welsh professional footballer who played as a defender. He began his career with Mid Rhondda before playing in the Football League with Cardiff City and Newport County. He later played for Barry Town.
