= Walter Robbins =

Welsh footballer

Personal information
- Full name: Walter William Robbins
- Date of birth: 24 November 1910
- Place of birth: Cardiff, Wales
- Date of death: 1979 (aged 68–69)
- Height: 5 ft 10 in (1.78 m)
- Position: Forward

Senior career*
Years	Team	Apps	(Gls)
1928–1931	Cardiff City	86	(38)
1931–1939	West Bromwich Albion	84	(28)

International career
1930–1935	Wales	11	(4)

Managerial career
- 1969: Swansea City (caretaker)
- * Club domestic league appearances and goals

Walter William Robbins (24 November 1910 –1979) was a Welsh professional footballer who played as a forward. He represented Wales from 1930 to 1935.

Following the end of World War II, Robbins worked as a trainer with Cardiff City, Newport County and Swansea City, where he briefly served as caretaker manager. After his coaching career, he moved to Manchester United as a scout.

== Club career ==
Having previously worked for a local brewery, Robbins was serving a motor engineering apprenticeship when he rose to attention after scoring 70 goals during a single season for Ely United in the Cardiff and District League at the age of 16. He signed for Cardiff City, making his debut during the 1928–29 season against Portsmouth, before scoring his first goal for the club in his next game, a 1–1 draw with Bolton Wanderers. Relegation to Division Two saw the departures of George McLachlan and Fred Warren during the following season, handing Robbins a regular first team place. On 6 February 1932, Robbins scored five goals during a 9–2 win over Thames, which remains the club's record league win. Several months later, Robbins was sold to West Bromwich Albion where he spent eight years, before the outbreak of World War II.

== International career ==
In 1929, Robbins was selected for the Football Association of Wales tour of Canada but these matches were not classed as international cap matches. His Cardiff City teammates Len Davies, Fred Keenor and Fred Warren were also selected for the tour. He made his full debut for Wales on 25 October 1930 in a 1–1 draw with Scotland.

=== International goals ===
Results list Wales' goal tally first.

Goal	Date	Venue	Opponent	Result	Competition
1.	18 November 1931	Anfield, Liverpool, England	England	1–3	1932 British Home Championship
2.	7 December 1932	Racecourse Ground, Wrexham, Wales	Ireland	4–1	1933 British Home Championship
3.	7 December 1932	Racecourse Ground, Wrexham, Wales	Ireland	4–1	1933 British Home Championship
4.	4 October 1933	Ninian Park, Cardiff, Wales	Scotland	3–2	1934 British Home Championship
