= Albert Miles (footballer) =

Welsh footballer

Personal information
- Full name: Albert Edwin Miles
- Date of birth: 1903
- Place of birth: Treorchy, Wales
- Position: Forward

Senior career*
Years	Team	Apps	(Gls)
- Bridgend Town
- Mid Rhondda
1925–1926	Luton Town		
1926–1927	Derby County		
1927–1930	Cardiff City	16	(8)
1930	Crystal Palace	0	(0)
- * Club domestic league appearances and goals

Albert Edwin Miles (1903 — after 1930) was a Welsh professional footballer who played as a forward. He made sixteen appearances in the Football League for Cardiff City.
