= Leslie Jones (footballer) =

Welsh footballer

Personal information
- Full name: Leslie Jenkin Jones
- Date of birth: 1 July 1911
- Place of birth: Aberdare, Wales
- Date of death: January 1981 (aged 69)
- Height: 5 ft 7 1/2 in (1.71 m)
- Position: Forward

Senior career*
Years	Team	Apps	(Gls)
????–1929	Aberdare Athletic		
1929–1934	Cardiff City	142	(31)
1934–1937	Coventry City	139	(69)
1937–1946	Arsenal	46	(3)
1946	Swansea Town	2	(0)
1946–1948	Barry Town		
1948–1949	Brighton & Hove Albion	3	(0)

International career
1933–1938	Wales	11	(1)

Managerial career
- 1946–1948: Barry Town (player-manager)
- 1950–1951: Scunthorpe United
- * Club domestic league appearances and goals

Leslie Jenkin Jones (1 July 1911 – January 1981) was a Welsh professional footballer.

== Career ==
Born in Aberdare, in his youth, Jones began his career at his local side Aberdare Athletic, while also working at his father's butchers shop, before signing for Cardiff City in 1929. He made his debut in a 1–0 defeat during a South Wales derby against Swansea Town. Despite Cardiff struggling and falling down the league during his time there he scored 31 goals in 142 league games. He earned the first of his eleven caps for Wales in the 1932–33 season. He eventually moved to Coventry City in January 1934 and went on to score 27 goals in his first full season for the club. His impressive scoring record at Highfield Road – seventy goals in 138 games – meant Jones attracted interest from various clubs and Coventry managed to resist a £7,000 offer from Tottenham Hotspur but couldn't resist an even higher offer from Arsenal in 1937, with Bobby Davidson going the other way.

Jones made his Arsenal debut against Grimsby Town on 6 November 1937, scoring in a 2–1 defeat, and he helped the club to a league title in the 1937–38 season; Jones played as a withdrawn inside forward for Arsenal and consequently scored fewer goals – just three in 31 appearances that season. He won a Charity Shield medal the following season but his career at Arsenal was limited due to the outbreak of World War II.

During the war he served in the Royal Air Force but still found time to play 71 wartime games and five wartime internationals for Wales. By the time the war ended, he was 35 and his final game for Arsenal was against West Ham United in the FA Cup on 9 January 1946. In total he played 50 times for the club, scoring three goals. In June 1940, he was one of five Arsenal players who guested for Southampton in a victory over Fulham at Craven Cottage.

He was released by Arsenal on a free transfer in 1946 and joined Swansea Town as a player-coach. His stay at the Vetch Field was short and he left to take over as player-manager at non-league side Barry Town before returning to the Football League with his final club, Brighton & Hove Albion, before retiring.

In June 1950, he was appointed manager of Scunthorpe United, becoming the club's first Football League manager and guided them to a twelfth-place finish in their first season in the League. Towards the end of the season his relationship with the board deteriorated and he resigned at the end of the season.

== Honours ==
Arsenal

- First Division: 1937–38
- FA Charity Shield: 1938

Coventry City

- Hall of Fame
