= William Roberts (footballer, born 1907) =

English footballer

Personal information
- Date of birth: 1907
- Place of birth: Birmingham, England
- Position: Defender

Senior career*
| Years | Team | Apps | (Gls) |
| ?–1928 | Flint Town United | | |
| 1928–1933 | Cardiff City | 130 | (1) |
- * Club domestic league appearances and goals

William J. Roberts (born 1907, date of death unknown) was an English professional footballer. He was born in Birmingham.

While playing amateur football for Flint Town United, Roberts impressed enough for the club to sign him on a full contract in 1928. During his four years at Ninian Park the club fell into a serious decline that saw them fall from division one to division three in the space of four years. Roberts was a virtual ever present during the freefall and scored his only goal for the Bluebirds in December 1929 during a 5–2 win over Southampton. He parted company with the club at the end of the 1932–33 season and did play professional football again.
