= Matt Robinson (footballer, born 1907) =

English footballer (1907–1987)

Matthew Robinson (21 April 1907 – August 1987) was an English footballer. His regular position was as a forward. He was born in Felling, County Durham. He played for Cardiff City, Chester, and Manchester United.
