= Thomas Helsby =

English footballer

Personal information
- Date of birth: 4 April 1904
- Place of birth: Runcorn, England
- Date of death: 29 August 1961 (aged 57)
- Position: Right half

Senior career*
Years	Team	Apps	(Gls)
–	Rhyl Athletic		
1925–1926	Wigan Borough	29	(0)
- Ellesmere Port Town
- Northwich Victoria
- Runcorn
1928–1931	Cardiff City	46	(2)
1931–1933	Bradford City	34	(0)
1933–1934	Swindon Town	34	(0)
- Hull City
–	Newport County		
- * Club domestic league appearances and goals

Thomas Helsby (4 April 1904 – 29 August 1961) was an English professional footballer who played as a right half.

== Career ==
Born in Runcorn, Helsby played football for Rhyl Athletic, Wigan Borough, Ellesmere Port Town, Northwich Victoria, Runcorn, Cardiff City, Bradford City, Swindon Town, Hull City and Newport County.

Helsby joined First Division side Cardiff City in April 1928 but initially struggled to break into the first team. When the club were relegated to the Second Division, he enjoyed a prolonged spell in the side before leaving in 1931. He signed for Bradford City in March of that year, leaving the club in June 1933 to sign for Swindon Town. During his time with Bradford City he made 34 appearances in the Football League, as well as one FA Cup appearance.

== Sources ==
- Frost, Terry (1988). Bradford City A Complete Record 1903-1988. Breedon Books Sport. ISBN 0-907969-38-0.
- Hayes, Dean (2006). The Who's Who of Cardiff City. Derby: Breedon Books. ISBN 978-1-85983-462-6.
