= Francis Harris (footballer) =

English footballer

Frank Harris
Personal information
- Full name: Francis Harris
- Date of birth: 5 April 1908
- Place of birth: Catshill, England
- Date of death: 1958 (aged 49–50)
- Position: Wing half

Senior career*
Years	Team	Apps	(Gls)
- Cradley Heath
19??–1928	Bromsgrove Rovers		
1928–1933	Cardiff City	130	(10)
1933–1935	Charlton Athletic	82	(8)
–	Brierley Hill Alliance		
- * Club domestic league appearances and goals

Francis Harris (5 April 1908 – 1958) was an English professional footballer. He was born in Catshill.

Harris began his football career at non-league sides Cradley Heath and Bromsgrove Rovers while working as a mechanic. In 1928, he signed for Cardiff City, scoring on his home debut in a 2–1 win over Leicester City. It took him several years to fully establish himself in the side as numerous minor injuries forced him in and out of the first team before missing just two games during the 1931–32 season. In 1933, he was sold to Charlton Athletic, who were also suffering from a slump in recent years but Harris was part of the team that helped the club win two consecutive promotions to return to the top flight. After leaving Charlton he played at Brierley Hill Alliance.
