= Billy Thirlaway =

English footballer (1896–1983)

Personal information
- Date of birth: 1 October 1896
- Place of birth: Washington, England
- Date of death: 1983 (aged 87)
- Place of death: Sunderland, England
- Height: 5 ft 5 1/2 in (1.66 m)
- Position: Outside left

Senior career*
Years	Team	Apps	(Gls)
19??–1921	Usworth Colliery		
1921–1924	West Ham United	36	(2)
1924	Southend United	8	(0)
1924–1925	Luton Town	13	(0)
1925–1926	South Shields	29	(4)
1926–1927	Birmingham	22	(1)
1927–1929	Cardiff City	108	(22)
1929–19??	Tunbridge Wells Rangers		
–	Usworth Colliery		
- * Club domestic league appearances and goals

William Thirlaway (1 October 1896 – 1983) was an English professional footballer who played as an outside left. He scored 29 goals from 216 appearances in the Football League.

Thirlaway was born in Washington, which was then in County Durham. He began his career at non-league side Usworth Colliery before moving into league football when he signed for West Ham United in 1921. He spent three years at the club before moving to Southend United in 1924. His stay at the club was short and he went on to play for another three clubs in the next two years, namely Luton Town, South Shields and Birmingham.

In March 1927 he joined Cardiff City, making his debut in a 2–2 draw with Sunderland. Thirlaway had joined the club during the season that they would go on to win the FA Cup, but he was unable to play any part in the triumph as he had made an appearance in the competition for Birmingham before joining Cardiff. He was able to play in the Charity Shield win, when Cardiff beat Corinthians 2–1. He left the club at the end of the 1928–29 season and returned to non-league football with Tunbridge Wells Rangers.

== Honours ==
Cardiff City

- FA Charity Shield winner: 1927
- Welsh Cup winner: 1928
- Welsh Cup finalist: 1929
