= Tom Farquharson =

Irish footballer (1899–1970)

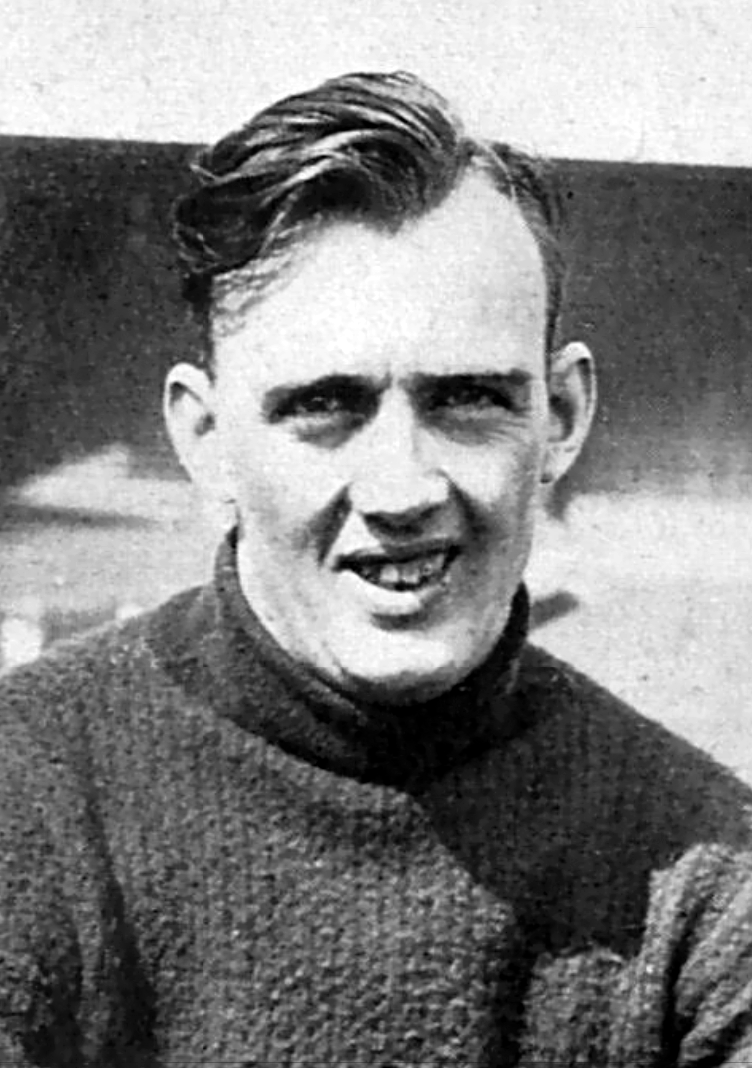

Personal information
- Full name: Thomas Gerard Farquharson
- Date of birth: 4 December 1900
- Place of birth: Dublin, Ireland
- Date of death: 24 December 1970 (aged 70)
- Place of death: Canada
- Height: 1.86 m (6 ft 1 in)
- Position: Goalkeeper

Youth career
- 1916–1919: Annually
- 1919–1920: CYMS

Senior career*
Years	Team	Apps	(Gls)
1921	Oakdale		
1921–1922	Abertillery Town		
1922–1935	Cardiff City	445	(0)

International career
1923–1925	Ireland	7	(0)
1929–1931	Irish Free State	4	(0)
1931	Welsh League XI	1	(0)
- * Club domestic league appearances and goals

Thomas Gerard Farquharson (4 December 1900 – 24 December 1970) was an Irish professional footballer who played as a goalkeeper. Born in Dublin, he played youth football for local sides. In his teens, he became a member of the Irish Republican Army and was arrested by the British Army for removing wanted posters and held in Mountjoy Prison. He was released on the basis that he would leave Ireland, which he did, choosing to settle in South Wales.

Farquharson played football for Oakdale and Abertillery Town before being spotted by Football League side Cardiff City in 1922 for whom he made his professional debut that May. He helped the side finish as runners-up in the First Division during the 1923–24 season and reach the 1925 FA Cup final. In 1927, he was a member of the Cardiff City team that became the only non-English side to win the FA Cup. He remained with the club until 1935, winning the Welsh Cup on four occasions and the FA Charity Shield once. Farquharson played in 445 Football League matches for Cardiff, which remained a club record until 1985.

A dual internationalist, he also played for both Ireland teams – the Irish Free State national football team and the Ireland national football team (IFA). After making his debut for the IFA side in 1923, he went on to win seven caps. In 1931, he caused controversy by rejecting a call up to instead play for the Irish Free State side with whom he won a further four caps.

== Early life ==
Farquharson was born on 4 December 1900 at 3 Lismore Cottages, Botanic Avenue, Dublin. He was the third child born to a Presbyterian father, Thomas Farquharson, a sanitary contractor, and a Catholic mother, Margaret Cassin, a dressmaker. Both of his parents hailed from Dublin and earned enough income to afford a live-in servant. Raised as a Catholic, he was brought up in the football heartland of Drumcondra at the family home in Golden Acre. The family later moved to Jones Road and his father became a reputable master builder and contractor in the area. Tom was educated at a school run by the Congregation of Christian Brothers.

== Club career ==
=== Early career ===
As a youth, Farquharson played Gaelic football before taking up association football with Annually in 1916. He helped the side reach the final of the Leinster Minor Cup, held at Shelbourne Park, where they defeated Olympic B 4–2. Annually folded in 1919 after being unable to secure suitable playing grounds. Farquharson instead began playing for a Catholic Young Men's Society (CYMS). However, he eventually left Dublin because of his Republican sympathies during the Irish War of Independence. He was described as a "non-violent member" of the Irish Republican Army (IRA), a role that included running messages for the group and transporting people to safehouses.

A 19-year-old student at the time, he was arrested along with his friend Seán Lemass, later to become Taoiseach, for pulling down British Army wanted posters in St Stephen's Green. This proved embarrassing to Farquharson's father, who conducted business with the British. Farquharson and Lemass were held at Mountjoy Prison but Farquharson was released on bail by a British Army Major who was a friend of his father on the basis that he would leave Ireland.

He was sent to work in Blackwood, Caerphilly, in South Wales, gaining employment as either a carpenter or a painter and decorator. On arriving in Wales, he took up rugby union, playing as a full back for his local side Blackwood. He later went to watch local Welsh Football League side Oakdale who found themselves short of a goalkeeper for a match. Farquharson offered his services where his experience playing Gaelic football proved invaluable. He then moved onto Southern Football League side Abertillery Town for the 1921–22 season. His performances for the side saw him chosen to represent a Welsh Southern Football League XI.

=== Cardiff City ===
Farquharson soon attracted the interest of Football League First Division side Cardiff City. His performances for Abertillery led to him being invited to a trial with Cardiff by club founder Walter Bartley Wilson in February 1922 before signing permanently. He made his debut for the club on the last day of the 1921–22 season, playing in a 3–1 victory over Manchester United on 6 May 1922. The following season, Ben Davies remained first choice at the start of the campaign before Farquharson featured in five consecutive matches between October and November 1922. The pair continued to compete throughout the season with Farquharson featuring in 21 league matches (one more than Davies) and playing in the club's 3–2 victory over Aberdare Athletic in the 1923 Welsh Cup final. His performances resulted in Davies' being sold at the end of the season to Leicester City with long-serving Herbert Kneeshaw remaining as cover.

Farquharson in goal is a football education. He satisfies the real test of the expert – everything he does seems ridiculously easy.

— Hugh Brett of the Irish Independent in an article prior to the 1925 FA Cup final

Having established himself as first choice, Farquharson featured 51 times during the 1923–24 season, missed only three matches during the campaign, featuring in all six of the club's FA Cup and Welsh Cup ties. Cardiff finished second in the First Division, losing out on winning the league title to Huddersfield Town on goal average. In the following campaign, Farquharson helped the side reach their first FA Cup final where they suffered a 1–0 defeat to Sheffield United. With the retirement of Kneeshaw, Farquharson saw off competition from Joe Hills and Tommy Hampson to continue his spell as first choice goalkeeper.

During the 1926–27 season, the club embarked on another FA Cup campaign to reach their second final in three seasons. He played in all six of Cardiff's fixtures leading up to the final. In his career, Farquharson had developed a reputation as a penalty specialist, even being dubbed "the penalty king". His method of saving spot kicks by rushing forward as the penalty was being taken proved so effective that in the quarterfinal of the FA Cup, his save to deny Chelsea forward Andrew Wilson's penalty prompted the sport's governing bodies to change the rules of the game. Goalkeepers were subsequently banned from rushing from their goal line when facing penalty kicks. Wilson later described the incident, remarking "I thought I was seeing things when I looked at Tom Farquharson in the Cardiff goal. As I placed the ball, he was standing with his back against the net [...] I shot and he dashed forward and made a wonder save." Farquharson explained the reasoning behind his technique, stating "By advancing forward I can leap to either side far more quickly than from a standing position."

In the final of the competition, Cardiff defeated Arsenal 1–0 at Wembley Stadium, becoming the only non-English side to have won the FA Cup. Farquharson kept five clean sheets from Cardiff's seven matches in the competition, conceding only three goals, becoming the first Irish goalkeeper to win the cup and keep a clean sheet in the final of the competition. At the end of the game, Farquharson acquired the match ball which he later donated to his church, which subsequently auctioned it for funds. The side returned to Cardiff following their victory where they were received by an estimated crowd of 150,000 people lining the streets to witness their return.

Farquharson remained as the club's first choice goalkeeper for several years after their cup success. However, economic troubles saw a steady decline for Cardiff and, in 1929, they were relegated from the First Division two years after winning the FA Cup. Their troubles continued as they were relegated to the Third Division South for the first time in their history soon after. In 1932, he nearly left the financially stricken club to join Hull City after a transfer offer was accepted. Cardiff planned to replace him with backup goalkeeper Len Evans, only for Evans to leave himself before the deal was completed. A board meeting was hastily arranged during which Farquharson agreed to remain with Cardiff, where he played for a further three years before retiring in 1935. In his book, The Who's Who of Cardiff City, Dean Hayes describes Farquharson as "without doubt [...] the greatest goalkeeper in the history of the club." He played in 445 matches in the Football League, a club record which stood until 1985 when it was surpassed by Phil Dwyer. His total remains the highest by any goalkeeper in the club's history.

== International career ==
When Farquharson began his international career in 1923 there were, in effect, two Ireland teams, chosen by two rival associations. Both associations, the Northern Ireland – based Irish Football Association (IFA) and the Irish Free State – based Football Association of the Irish Free State (FAIFS) claimed jurisdiction over the whole of Ireland and selected players from the whole island. As a result, several notable Irish players from this era, including Farquharson, played for both teams.

Between 1923 and 1927 Farquharson played seven times for the IFA XI. He made his debut for the IFA XI on 3 March 1923 in a 1–0 defeat to Scotland. On 10 October 1923, Farquharson was a member the IFA XI that beat England 2–1 at Windsor Park. He made his last appearance for the IFA XI on 28 February 1925 in a 3–0 defeat to Scotland. His appearances for the side were limited due to the presence of Elisha Scott.

=== Irish Free State side ===
Between 1929 and 1931 Farquharson also played four times for the FAIFS XI. He had made his debut for an FAIFS XI shortly after winning the 1927 FA Cup with Cardiff, playing in a charity match against a Leinster Football Association XI. The match was regarded as unofficial, which meant the players were not awarded caps. He made his competitive debut for the side on 20 April 1929 in a 4–0 win against Belgium at Dalymount Park. On 11 May 1930 he won his second cap for the FAI XI when he played against Belgium again, helping his side to a 3–1 away win.

In April 1931, this situation saw Farquharson briefly embroiled in controversy when he was called up by the IFA to play against Wales but opted instead to play for the FAI XI against Spain. His comments made in a newspaper interview after his decision proved controversial when he claimed that "I will go so far as to say that the Irish Football Association usurped the name of Ireland by calling the side they have selected "Ireland"". His decision and comments saw him honoured with an award at a special presentation by the FAIFS. Soon after, he also appeared for a Welsh League XI against their counterparts from the Irish Free State at Dalymount Park, suffering a 3–1 defeat.

The highlight of his appearances for the FAI XI came on 26 April 1931 when he helped them hold Spain to 1–1 draw in the Montjuic Stadium in Barcelona. Farquharson was team captain and after conceding a penalty, he redeemed himself by saving the resulting spot kick. He made his final appearance for the FAI XI on 13 December 1931 in a 5–0 defeat to Spain at Dalymount Park.

== Personal life ==
After moving to Wales, Farquharson joined the order of the Benedictines. His wife Pearl hailed from Skerries in Dublin and the pair had five children together, three girls and two boys. Farquharson was believed to have carried a handgun in his kitbag during his playing career "for protection" following his involvement with the IRA in his youth. Several former teammates of his verified the fact and several claimed to have seen the weapon; Ernie Curtis stated in an interview "Tom told me about being on the move from house to house – and that he always carried a gun. He opened up his kit bag and there it was!" Eddie Jenkins also recalled an incident when Farquharson was annoyed by teammate George Russell, who he believed was showing off, and produced the weapon before he tongue-in-cheek "threatened to shoot him if he didn't behave".

Farquharson and his family lived on Allensbank Road in Heath, Cardiff, before later moving to Cyncoed in the northern part of the city. Following his retirement from football, Farquharson returned to his work as a painter and decorator. He later opened a tobacconist's in Cardiff City Centre. In July 1948, Farquharson was convicted of illegal distribution of Irish sweepstakes tickets and was fined £250. He ran his shop until he and his wife decided to emigrate to Canada; all five of his children had emigrated there in previous years. His daughter Pam later described her father as "a very passive, quiet and private man."

Farquharson's son Donald Farquharson was also an accomplished sportsman. He was an early pioneer of masters athletics and founded the Canadian Masters Athletics Association. His great-grandson Steve Farquharson was drafted to the Ontario Hockey League in the 3rd round (58th overall) to the Toronto St. Michael's Majors where he played two seasons before playing one season with the Barrie Colts. He later became a scout for the Colts.

Tom Farquharson died of a heart attack on 24 December 1970 at the age of 70.

== Career statistics ==
Club	Season	League			FA Cup		Other (Note: Includes other competitive competitions, including the FA Charity Shield, Welsh Cup and Football League Third Division South Cup.)		Total	
Club	Season	Division	Apps	Goals	Apps	Goals	Apps	Goals	Apps	Goals
Cardiff City	1921–22	First Division	1	0	0	0	0	0	1	0
Cardiff City	1922–23	First Division	21	0	1	0	2	0	24	0
Cardiff City	1923–24	First Division	39	0	6	0	6	0	51	0
Cardiff City	1924–25	First Division	37	0	8	0	1	0	46	0
Cardiff City	1925–26	First Division	33	0	0	0	1	0	34	0
Cardiff City	1926–27	First Division	40	0	7	0	4	0	51	0
Cardiff City	1927–28	First Division	37	0	3	0	5	0	45	0
Cardiff City	1928–29	First Division	35	0	0	0	4	0	39	0
Cardiff City	1929–30	Second Division	39	0	2	0	4	0	45	0
Cardiff City	1930–31	Second Division	39	0	2	0	4	0	45	0
Cardiff City	1931–32	Third Division South	38	0	3	0	2	0	43	0
Cardiff City	1932–33	Third Division South	38	0	2	0	3	0	43	0
Cardiff City	1933–34	Third Division South	34	0	0	0	3	0	37	0
Cardiff City	1934–35	Third Division South	14	0	0	0	0	0	14	0
Total			445	0	34	0	39	0	518	0

== Honours ==
Cardiff City

- FA Cup: 1926–27; runner-up: 1924–25
- FA Charity Shield: 1927
- Welsh Cup: 1923, 1927, 1928, 1930; runner-up: 1929
