= Fred Warren (footballer, born 1907) =

Welsh footballer (1907–1986)

Freddie Warren
Personal information
- Full name: Frederick Windsor Warren
- Date of birth: 23 December 1907
- Place of birth: Cardiff, Wales
- Date of death: 1986
- Position: Forward

Senior career*
Years	Team	Apps	(Gls)
1927–1930	Cardiff City	37	(8)
1930–1936	Middlesbrough	160	(49)
1936–1939	Heart of Midlothian	110	(31)

International career
1929–1938	Wales	6	(3)
- * Club domestic league appearances and goals

Frederick Windsor Warren (23 December 1907 – 1986) was a Welsh professional footballer and international player on teams for Wales.

== Club career ==
Warren began his career at his home town club Cardiff City, spending time as understudy to George McLachlan before becoming a more regular first team player. In January 1930, he was sold to Division One side Middlesbrough for a fee of £8,000, in a transfer that also involved Joe Hillier and Jack Jennings. After six years with Middlesbrough, Warren joined Heart of Midlothian, where he later became the club's first Welsh international. He remained at Tynecastle until the outbreak of World War II, returning to South Wales to work for Barry Town.

== International career ==
Warren made his debut for Wales on 2 February 1929, scoring in a 2–1 win over Ireland in the 1929 British Home Championship. Four months later, during the summer of 1929 Warren was selected for the Football Association of Wales tour of Canada but these matches were not classed as international cap matches. His Cardiff City teammates Len Davies, Fred Keenor and Walter Robbins were also selected for the tour. During his career, he earned 6 caps for Wales over a period of nine years, scoring three times with all three being scored in matches against Ireland at the Racecourse Ground.

=== International goals ===
Results list Wales' goal tally first.

Goal	Date	Venue	Opponent	Result	Competition
1.	2 February 1929	Racecourse Ground, Wrexham, Wales	Ireland	2–1	1929 British Home Championship
2.	22 April 1931	Racecourse Ground, Wrexham, Wales	Ireland	3–2	1931 British Home Championship
3.	17 March 1937	Racecourse Ground, Wrexham, Wales	Ireland	4–1	1937 British Home Championship
