= Harry Wake =

English footballer

Personal information
- Full name: Henry Williamson Wake
- Date of birth: 21 January 1901
- Place of birth: Seaton Delaval, England
- Date of death: 1981 (aged 79–80)
- Height: 5 ft 8 in (1.73 m)
- Positions: Right half; inside right

Senior career*
Years	Team	Apps	(Gls)
?–1919	Bigges Colliery		
1919–1923	Newcastle United	3	(0)
1923–1931	Cardiff City	149	(9)
1931–1932	Mansfield Town	20	(0)
1932	Gateshead	0	(0)
1932–?	Wigan Athletic		
- * Club domestic league appearances and goals

Henry Williamson Wake (born 21 January 1901 — 1981) was an English professional footballer. He is most famous for playing for Cardiff City in the 1925 FA Cup Final and being part of the team that won the 1927 FA Cup, although he missed the final through injury.

== Career ==
Born in Seaton Delaval, Wake began his career playing local football for Bigges Colliery before turning professional to join Newcastle United in 1919. He moved on to Cardiff City in 1923, making his debut in February 1924 in a 1–1 draw with Tottenham Hotspur. In 1925 he was a major part of the team that reached the final of the 1925 FA Cup, playing in all of the club's seven games leading up to the final.

The final took place on 25 April with Cardiff losing 1–0 to Sheffield United. It was a mistake from Wake that cost his team the match. United defender Harry Pantling hit a long pass down the pitch towards an area of the field Wake was covering but he hesitated and failed to cut out the pass, leaving the ball to fly past him to Fred Tunstall who scored the only goal of the game. Following the match Wake was chastised in the Welsh media with headlines such as "Wake Not Awake" on newspapers across the country and it took several years for him to live down his mistake.

He went on to reach a second final for Cardiff two years later in 1927 when they went on to win the match 1–0 against Arsenal. Wake scored one of Cardiff's goals in a 3–0 semi-final win over Reading however he went on to miss the final as he suffered damage to his kidneys in a 3–2 win against Sheffield Wednesday in a league match. Despite one London newspaper reporting his death, he went on to play for Cardiff until 1931 when he joined Mansfield Town, playing in the Stags first ever league match. He also played in the first ever match played by Wigan Athletic in 1932 following the club's founding after the collapse of the previous club, Wigan Borough.

== Honours ==
Cardiff City

- FA Cup runner-up: 1924–25
