= List of Sheffield United F.C. players (25–99 appearances) =

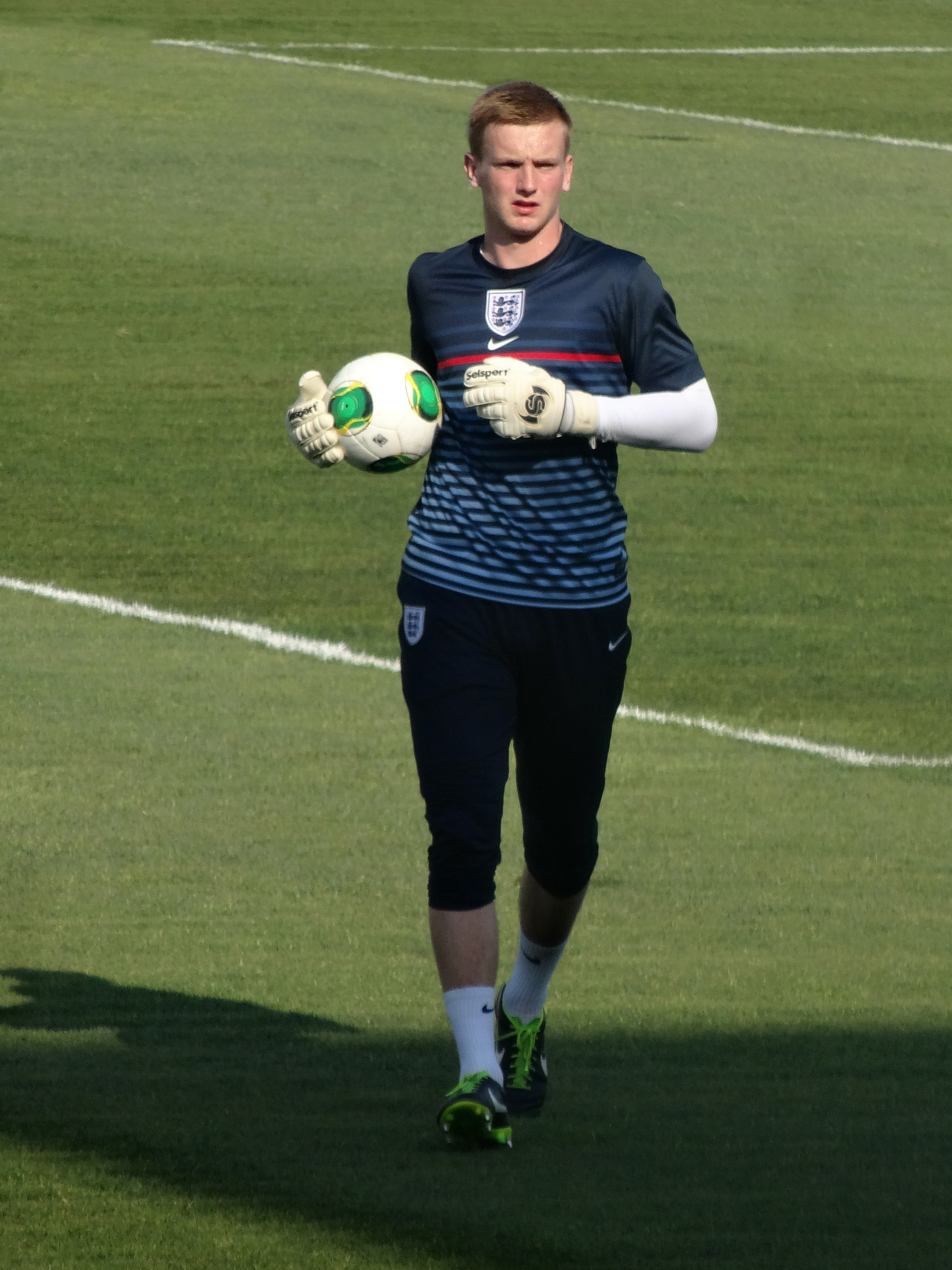
George Long, who is a current player of Millwall FC.

Sheffield United Football Club is an English professional football club who play at Bramall Lane in Sheffield. They were formed in 1889 and played their first competitive match in October of that year, when they entered the first qualifying round of the FA Cup. Since then more than 1,000 players have made a competitive first-team appearance for the club, of whom a large number have made between 25 and 99 appearances (including substitute appearances); those players are listed here.

== Overview of the list ==
Since the club's formation in 1889 over 300 players have made between 25 and 99 appearances for the club. Throughout the club's history no player has played 99 competitive gamed for the Blades without going on to make a 100th appearance. The closest to achieving this feat are the six players that played 98 times prior to leaving the club; they being Peter Beagrie, Alonzo Drake, Colin Grainger, Tom Heffernan, Bobby Howitt, and Mark Todd. Midfielder Stefan Scougall was the most recent player to reach the 25 appearance mark for Sheffield United in October 2014, and of the current United squad, eight players (Jose Baxter, Ben Davies, Bob Harris, Mark Howard, George Long, Stephen McGinn, Jamie Murphy, and Stefan Scougall) feature on this list but therefore have the opportunity to add more appearances to their total.

A number of players on this list had more than one spell with United, but only Jon Harley signed for the Blades on three separate occasions (twice on loan and once on a permanent contract), becoming one of only two players to achieve this feat in the club's history. There are also a number of players on this list whose entire time with United was spent on loan; Mark Bunn, Conor Coady, Greg Halford, and Nyron Nosworthy. The most prolific scorer to appear on this list is striker Bert Menlove who scored 43 times in his 81 appearances between 1922 and 1926.

== Explanation of list ==
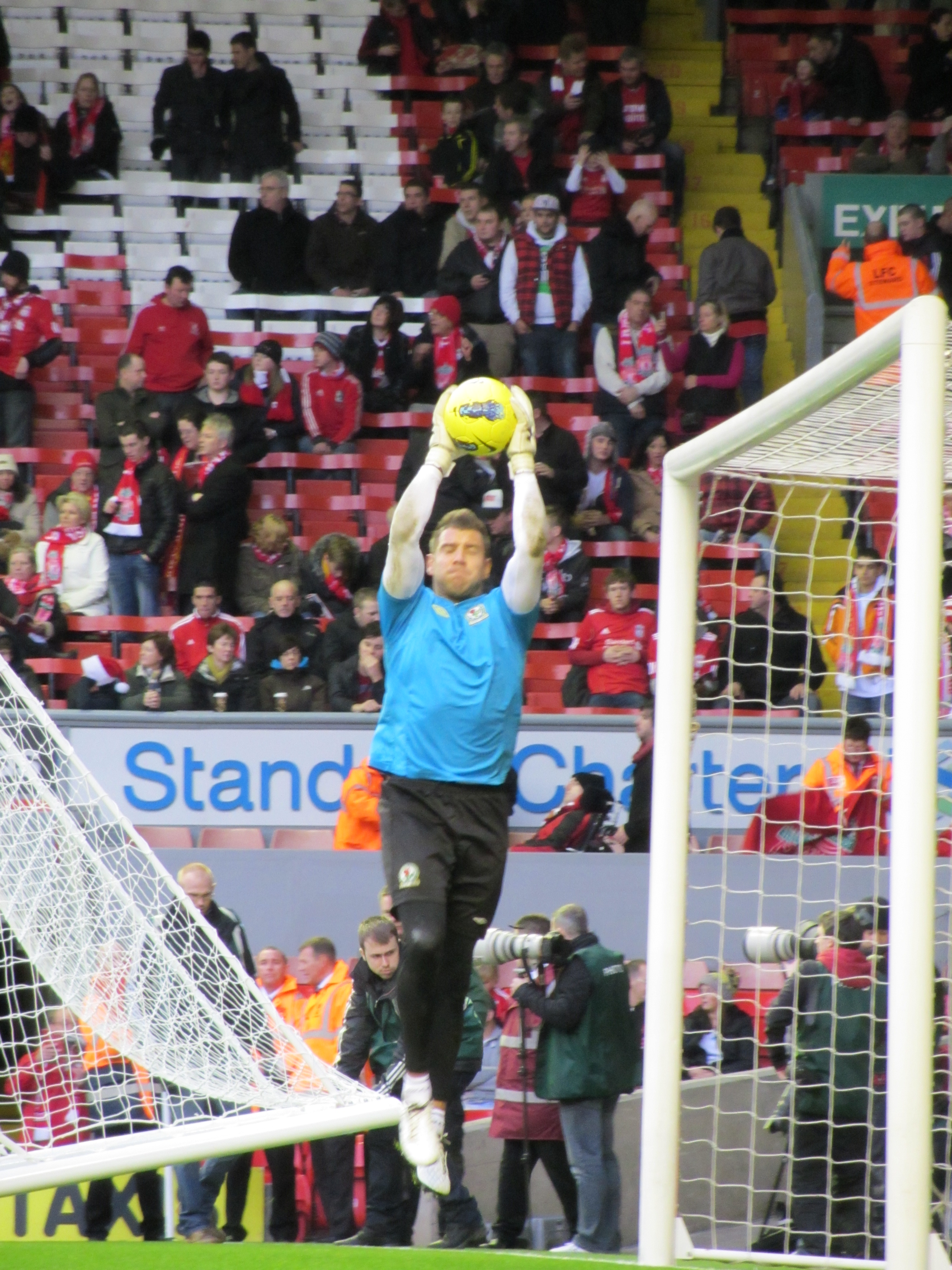
Goalkeeper Mark Bunn, all of whose 35 appearances for United came while on loan during the 2009–10 season.

Players are listed in alphabetical order of their surname. Appearances, substitute appearances and goals are included but wartime matches and friendlies are excluded. Further information on competitions/seasons which are regarded as eligible for appearance stats are provided below (dependent on the years at which the player was at the club), and if any data is not available for any of these competitions an appropriate note should be added to the table.

=== Appearances ===
Games included in the stats include appearances in:

- Midland Football League, Northern League, Football League/Premier League
- Test matches and play-off matches
- International, national and local cup fixtures including; FA Cup, Football League Cup, Football League Trophy, Football League Group Cup, Texaco Cup, Anglo-Scottish Cup, Anglo-Italian Cup, Watney Cup

NB: Friendly matches, exhibition games, and pre-season tournaments are excluded from the figures. Games played during both World Wars are considered friendlies and therefore are also not counted.

=== Table headers ===
- Nationality – If a player played international football, the country/countries he played for are shown. Otherwise, the player's nationality is given as their country of birth.
- Sheffield United career – The year of the player's first appearance for Sheffield United to the year of his last appearance. Where a player had more than one spell at the club these are listed chronologically.
- Starts – The number of games started.
- Sub – The number of games played as a substitute.
- Total – The total number of games played, both as a starter and as a substitute.

=== Key ===
- Playing positions: GK = Goalkeeper; DF = Defender; MF = Midfielder; FW = Forward
- † Players with this colour and symbol in the "Name" column are currently signed to Sheffield United.

== List of players ==
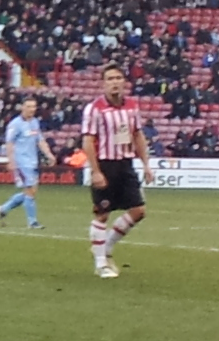
Forward Jose Baxter, a former member of the Sheffield United squad.

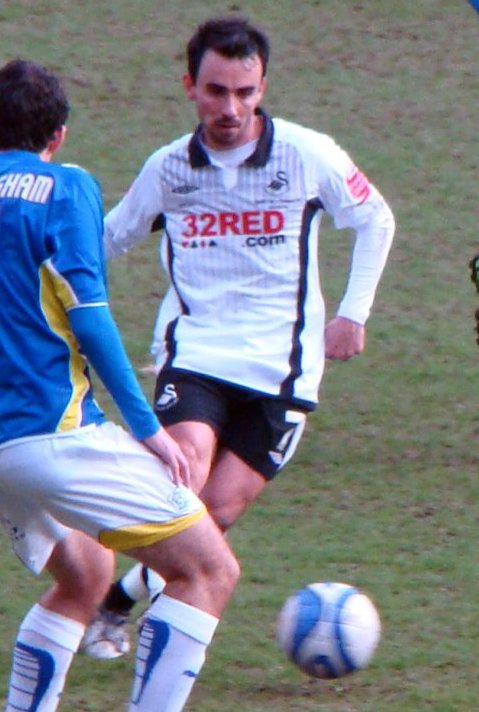
Leon Britton, who spent half a season with Sheffield United in 2010–11.

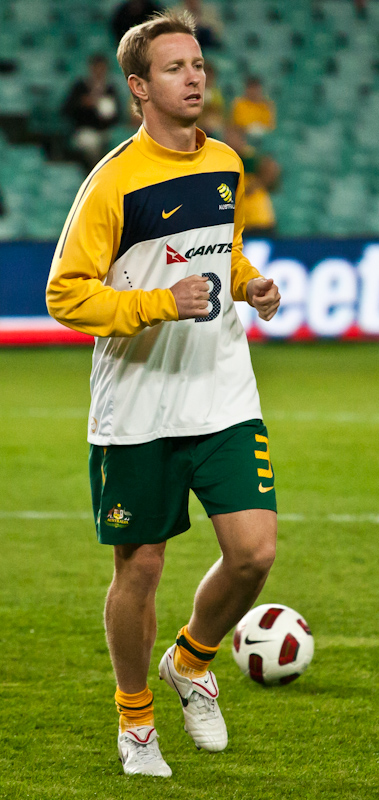
Australian winger David Carney who made 27 appearances for Sheffield United.

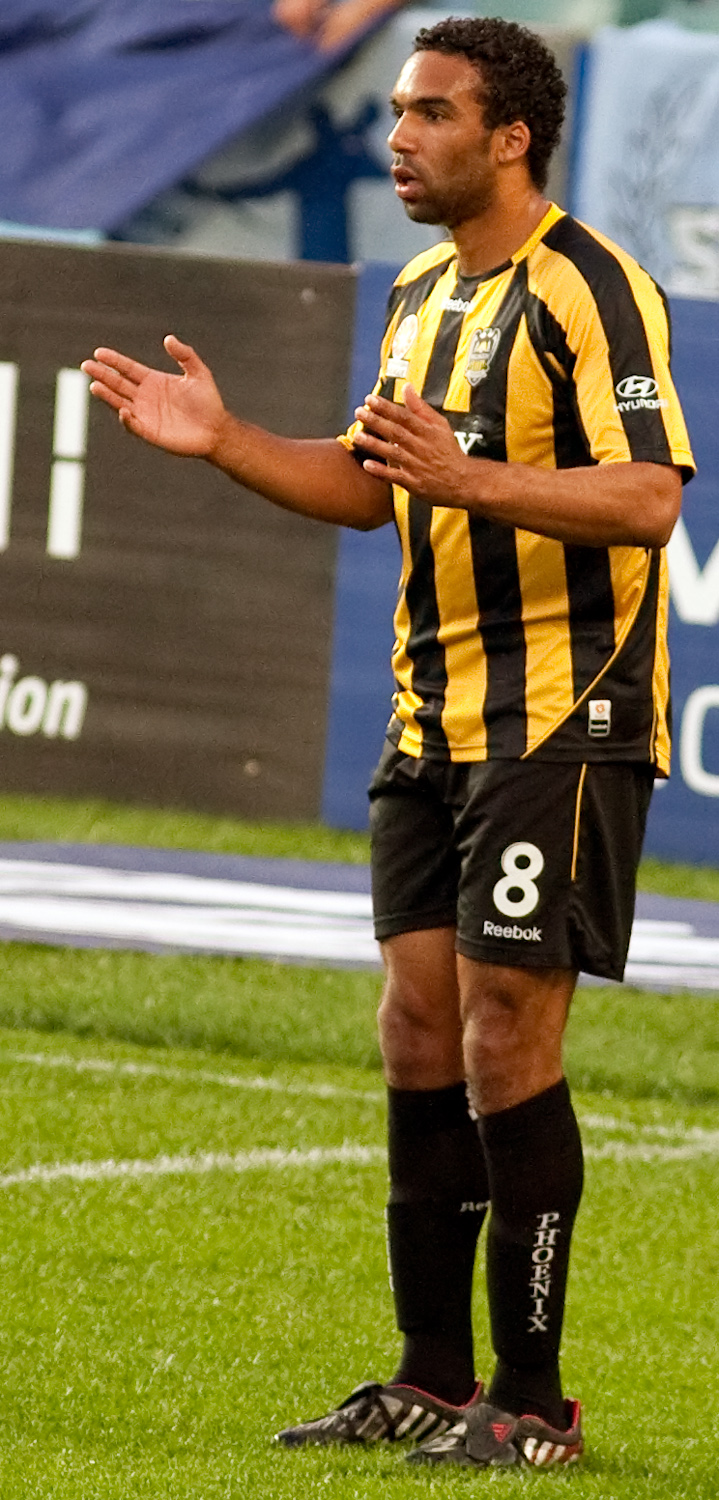
Paul Ifill scored nine goals in 45 appearances for United.

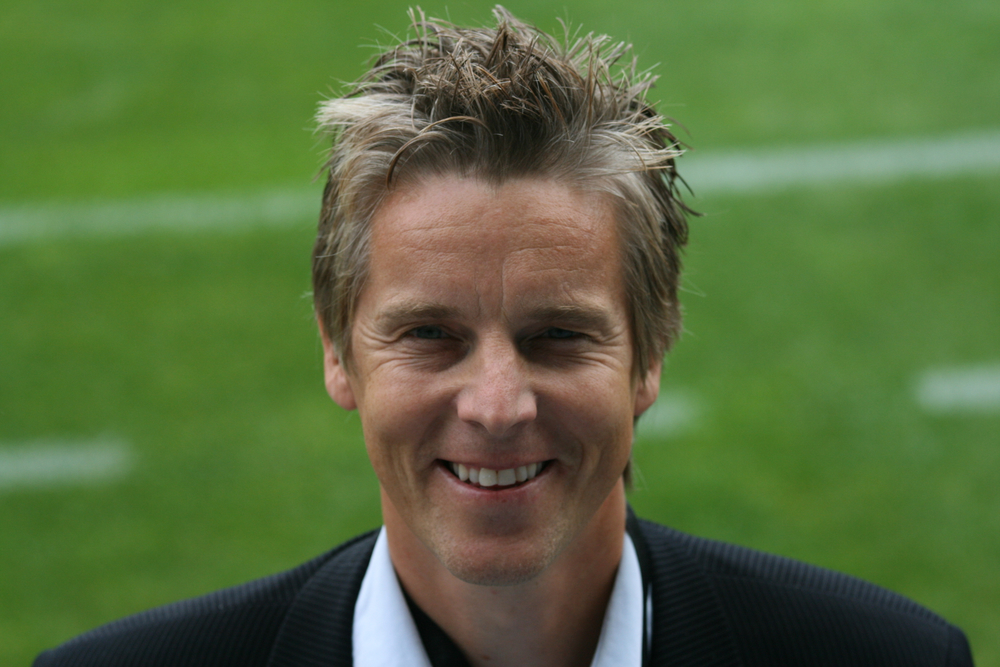
Striker Jan Åge Fjørtoft who scored 23 goals in just 42 games for the Blades.

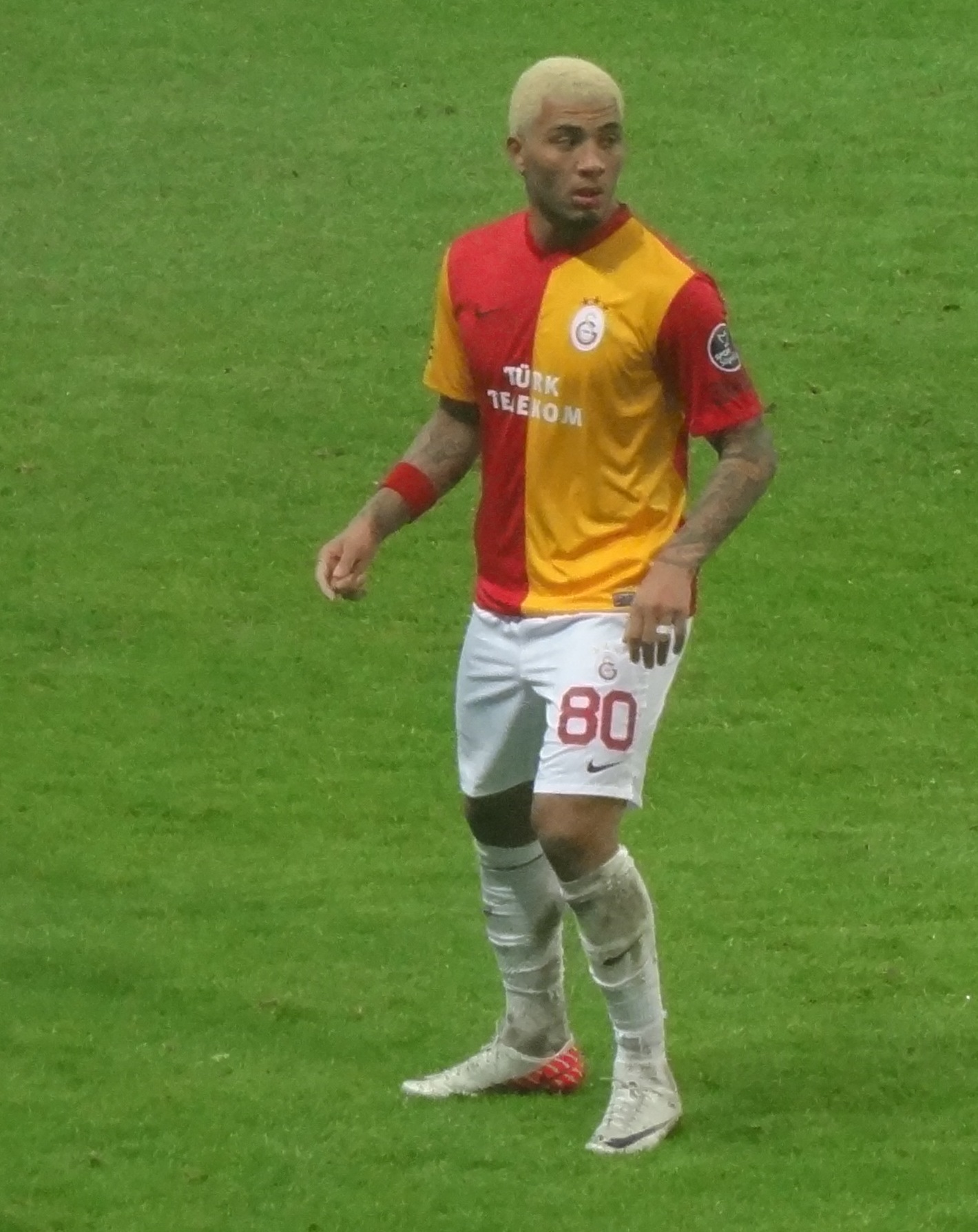
Turkish international Colin Kazim-Richards played 29 times for United before moving to Fenerbahçe.

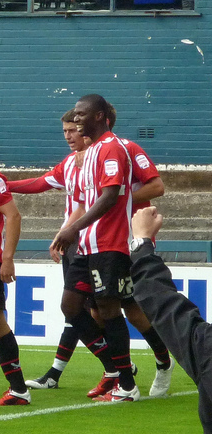
Haitian defender Lecsinel Jean-François spent two injury plagued seasons at Bramall Lane, playing only 32 times.

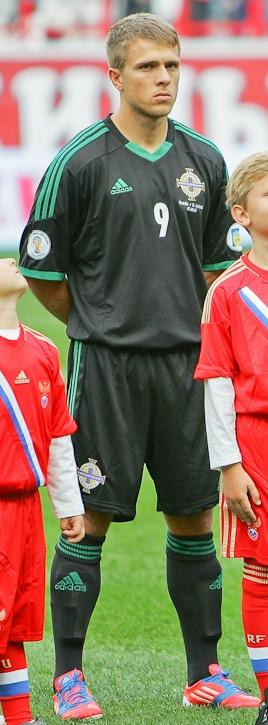
Jamie Ward scored 11 goals in his 71 appearances for Sheffield United.

List of Sheffield United F.C. players with between 25 and 99 appearances
Name	Nationality	Position	Sheffield United career	Starts	Subs	Total	Goals	Ref
Name	Nationality	Position	Sheffield United career	Appearances			Goals	Ref
Wayne Allison	England	FW	2002–2004	40	51	91	10	
Peter Anderson	England	MF	1978–1979	31	2	33	12	
Bill Anderson	England	DF	1933–1935	27	0	27	0	
Archie Annan	Scotland	DF	1904–1905	28	0	28	0	
Carl Asaba	England	FW	2001–2003	63	17	70	24	
Teddy Ashton	England	MF	1936–1938	39	0	39	5	
Bob Atkins	England	DF	1981–1985	48	6	54	3	
Billy Barnes	England	FW	1899–1902	25	0	25	8	
Andy Barnsley	England	DF	1986–1988	89	6	95	0	
Billy Batty	England	FW	1907–1910	40	0	40	0	
Jose Baxter†	England	FW	2013–	43	11	53	12	
Peter Beagrie	England	FW	1986–1988	95	3	98	11	
James Beattie	England	FW	2007–2009; 2011–2012	62	22	84	34	
Billy Beer	England	MF	1897–1901	91	0	91	21	
Graham Benstead	England	GK	1989–1990	70	0	70	0	
Marcus Bent	England	FW	1999–2000; 2011 (loan)	60	7	67	24	
Nick Blackman	England	FW	2012–2013	32	1	33	14	
Ernest Blackwell	England	GK	1914–1925	61	0	61	0	
John Blair	Scotland	FW	1927–1929	34	0	34	7	
Nathan Blake	Wales	FW	1994–1995	60	15	75	35	
Edgar Bluff	England	FW	1905–1907	68	0	68	16	
Bob Bolam	England	MF	1920–1921	34	0	34	2	
Daniel Bogdanović	Malta	FW	2010–2011	13	23	36	5	
Jim Bone	England	FW	1973–1974	33	1	34	11	
Eddie Boot	England	MF	1935–1937; 1941 (guest)	47	0	47	0	
Vas Borbokis	Greece	DF	1997–1999	74	0	74	9	
Arthur Bottom	England	FW	1948–1954	31	0	31	9	
Jeff Bourne	England	FW	1979–1980	30	1	31	11	
Willie Boyd	Scotland	FW	1933–1935	49	0	49	32	
David Bradford	England	FW	1974–1976	69	9	78	3	
Gary Brazil	England	FW	1980–1985	50	30	80	11	
Leon Britton	England	MF	2010–2011	24	2	26	0	
Billy Bromage	England	FW	1906–1908	32	0	32	5	
Duggie Brown	England	FW	1979–1980	22	9	31	5	
Fred Brown	England	FW	1915–1923	44	0	44	8	
Len Browning	England	FW	1951–1953	74	0	74	29	
Mark Bunn	England	GK	2009–2010 (loan)	34	1	35	0	
Barry Butlin	England	FW	1979–1980	66	4	70	13	
Richard Cadette	England	FW	1987–1988	31	2	33	7	
William Calder	Scotland	FW	1889–1891	27	0	27	7	
Cliff Calvert	England	DF	1975–1979	91	6	97	8	
Henri Camara	Senegal	FW	2009–2010	11	14	25	4	
Steve Cammack	England	FW	1972–1975	26	17	43	5	
Bobby Campbell	Northern Ireland	FW	1977–1978	41	2	43	14	
Willie Carlin	England	MF	1967–1968	42	0	42	3	
David Carney	Australia	MF	2007–2009	23	4	27	3	
Joe Carr	England	DF	1937–1939	32	0	32	0	
Pat Carrigan	Scotland	DF	1930–1933	59	0	59	0	
Paul Casey	Germany	DF	1980–1982	27	2	29	7	
Harry Cawthorne	England	DF	1927–1929	28	0	28	0	
Bert Chandler	England	DF	1926–1929	79	0	79	0	
Phil Cliff	England	MF	1967–1970	22	6	28	9	
Conor Coady	England	MF	2013–2014 (loan)	42	8	50	6	
Glenn Cockerill	England	MF	1984–1985	69	0	69	11	
Alf Common	England	FW	1901–1904	79	0	79	24	
Alan Cork	England	FW	1992–1994	32	32	64	9	
David Cotterill	Wales	MF	2008–2009	45	19	64	6	
Tom Cowan	Scotland	DF	1991–1993	53	0	53	0	
Edward Cross	England	DF	1890–1891	26	0	26	0	
Jack Cross	England	FW	1954–1955	46	0	46	18	
John Cunningham	Scotland	FW	1897–1898	26	0	26	7	
Keith Curle	England	DF	2000–2002	57	4	61	1	
Terry Curran	England	FW	1982–1983	42	2	44	3	
Ben Davies†	England	MF	2014 (loan); 2014–	20	12	32	7	
David Davies	Wales	FW	1913–1915	30	0	30	9	
Fred Davies	England	FW	1891–1895	28	0	28	7	
Bobby Davison	England	FW	1992 (loan); 1993–1994	19	8	27	6	
Len De Goey	Netherlands	MF	1979–1980	39	0	39	5	
Traianos Dellas	Greece	MF	1997–1999	16	15	31	3	
Mark Dempsey	England	MF	1986–1988	70	4	74	11	
Shaun Derry	England	MF	1998–2000	73	10	83	1	
Laurent D'Jaffo	Benin	FW	2000–2002	46	28	74	12	
Ben Doane	England	DF	1999–2003	20	6	26	1	
Samuel Dobson	England	MF	1891–1893	37	0	37	19	
John Docherty	Scotland	MF	1961–1965	47	0	47	13	
Jimmy Donnelly	England	MF	1902–1907	93	0	93	23	
Alonzo Drake	England	FW	1903–1907	98	0	98	20	
John Drummond	Scotland	FW	1891–1904	88	0	88	24	
Jeff Eckhardt	England	DF	1984–1987	82	1	83	2	
Arthur Eggleston	England	MF	1937–1944	63	0	63	9	
Ugo Ehiogu	England	DF	2008–2009	17	10	27	1	
Jack English	England	DF	1913–1916	69	0	69	0	
Johannes Ertl	Austria	MF	2010–2012	30	9	39	0	
Mel Eves	England	FW	1984–1986	26	2	28	10	
Willie Falconer	Scotland	MF	1993–1994	23	2	25	3	
George Featherstone	England	MF	1908–1909	29	0	29	11	
Tom Fenoughty	England	FW	1964–1969	53	5	58	6	
Tony Field	England	FW	1974–1976	75	5	80	15	
Oakey Field	England	MF	1898–1901	61	0	61	19	
Steve Finnieston	England	FW	1978–1979	27	0	27	6	
Denis Finnigan	England	DF	1960–1967	30	0	30	0	
Jan Åge Fjørtoft	Norway	FW	1997–1998	36	6	42	23	
Billy Fleming	England	MF	1893–1894	26	0	26	6	
Jostein Flo	Norway	FW	1993–1995	79	11	90	22	
John Flood	Scotland	MF	1978–1981	20	6	26	3	
Steve Foley	England	MF	1985–1987	68	11	79	18	
David Ford	England	FW	1971–1973	27	6	33	5	
Jonathan Forte	Barbados	FW	2002–2006; 2013 (loan)	12	39	51	2	
Jack Fountain	England	DF	1951–1956	36	0	36	0	
David Frain	England	MF	1986–1988	40	11	51	6	
John Francis	England	FW	1988–1990	20	33	53	8	
Hugh Gallagher	Scotland	FW	1893–1894	48	0	48	8	
Terry Garbett	England	MF	1974–1975	31	9	40	0	
John Gibson	United States	DF	1929–1933	80	0	80	0	
Stephen Goulding	England	DF	1971–1977	48	0	48	0	
Colin Grainger	England	FW	1953–1957	98	0	98	27	
Andy Gray	Scotland	FW	2004–2005	63	2	65	28	
Albert Groves	England	DF	1903–1906	65	0	65	0	
Chris Guthrie	England	FW	1975–1977	77	2	79	23	
Greg Halford	England	MF	2008–2009 (loan)	41	10	51	9	
Cliff Halliwell	England	DF	1921–1926	27	0	27	0	
Ian Hamilton	England	FW	1976–1978	68	5	73	15	
Ian Hamilton	England	MF	1998–2000	48	10	58	4	
Willie Hamilton	Scotland	FW	1956–1960	92	0	92	21	
Harry Hampson	England	FW	1938–1942	45	0	45	13	
Jon Harley	England	DF	2002–2003 (loan); 2003 (loan); 2004–2005	71	1	72	3	
James Harper	England	MF	2009–2010 (loan); 2010	23	3	26	4	
Bernard Harris	England	DF	1924–1927	46	0	46	0	
Bob Harris†	Scotland	DF	2014 (loan); 2014–	20	8	28	0	
Charlie Hartfield	England	MF	1991–1995	52	13	64	1	
Fred Hawley	England	DF	1913–1918	65	0	66	1	
Mick Heaton	England	DF	1965–1970	39	3	42	0	
Tom Heffernan	Republic of Ireland	DF	1983–1985	98	0	98	5	
Darius Henderson	England	FW	2008–2011	68	12	80	21	
Mick Henderson	England	DF	1982–1984	87	2	89	0	
Lee Hendrie	England	MF	2007–2009	12	15	27	4	
Bob Hill	Scotland	FW	1892–1895	68	0	68	21	
Matt Hill	England	DF	2012 (loan); 2012–2014	83	12	95	0	
Mick Hill	Wales	FW	1967–1969	42	2	44	12	
Walter Hill	England	DF	1892–1896	25	0	25	0	
Trevor Hockey	Wales	MF	1971–1972	84	0	84	4	
Doug Hodgson	Australia	DF	1994–1997	30	8	38	1	
John Hope	England	GK	1971–1974	71	0	71	0	
Brian Howard	England	MF	2008–2009 (loan); 2009	32	7	39	3	
Harry Howard	England	DF	1895–1901	58	0	58	2	
Mark Howard†	England	GK	2012–	50	0	50	0	
Bobby Howitt	Scotland	FW	1955–1958	98	0	98	33	
Walter Hoyland	England	FW	1921–1927	27	0	27	4	
Rob Hulse	England	FW	2006–2008	38	15	53	8	
Jonathan Hunt	England	MF	1998 (loan); 1999–2000	25	9	34	2	
George Hutchinson	England	FW	1948–1953	84	0	84	11	
Don Hutchison	Scotland	MF	1996–1998	80	11	91	6	
Paul Ifill	Barbados	MF	2005–2006	34	11	45	9	
Fred Jessop	England	DF	1937–1939	31	0	31	1	
Roy John	Wales	GK	1934–1935	31	0	31	0	
Lecsinel Jean-François	Haiti	DF	2011–2013	27	5	32	0	
Charlie Johnson	England	DF	1905–1910	74	0	74	0	
Glyn Jones	England	FW	1956–1957	31	0	31	4	
Jack Jones	Wales	FW	1894–1897	37	0	37	6	
Phil Jones	England	MF	1978–1981	33	3	36	1	
Vinnie Jones	Wales	MF	1990–1991	41	0	41	2	
Steve Kabba	England	FW	2002–2006	54	34	88	23	
Chris Kamara	England	MF	1992–1993 (loan); 1993–1994	22	3	25	0	
Colin Kazim-Richards	Turkey	FW	2006–2007	17	12	29	1	
Andy Keeley	England	DF	1977–1981	34	0	34	1	
David Kelley	Republic of Ireland	FW	2000–2001	26	14	40	8	
Jack Kendall	England	GK	1930–1934	91	0	91	0	
Mick Killourhy	England	FW	1932–1936	31	0	31	6	
Jeff King	Scotland	FW	1982–1983	41	2	43	5	
Dave Kitson	England	FW	2012–2013	33	4	37	12	
Martin Kuhl	England	MF	1987–1988	42	0	42	4	
Mike Lake	England	MF	1989–1993	27	19	46	5	
Dick Leafe	England	FW	1911–1913; 1915 (guest)	28	0	28	15	
Andy Leaning	England	GK	1987–1988	25	0	25	0	
Jack Lester	England	FW	2003–2004	31	19	50	16	
Ray Lewington	England	MF	1985–1986	43	0	43	0	
Kevin Lewis	England	FW	1957–1960	80	0	80	29	
Charlie Leyfield	England	FW	1937–1938	40	0	40	13	
Andy Liddell	Scotland	MF	2004–2005	32	7	39	6	
Harry Lilley	England	DF	1890–1894	65	0	65	0	
Will Lilley	England	GK	1891–1894	30	0	30	3	
Adrian Littlejohn	England	FW	1991–1995; 2001	55	30	85	15	
George Long†	England	GK	2011–	78	1	79	0	
Dennis Longhorn	England	MF	1976–1978	41	3	44	2	
Matthew Lowton	England	DF	2010–2012	76	13	89	10	
Steve Ludlam	England	MF	1975–1977	33	2	35	1	
Stan Machent	England	MF	1939–1947	29	0	29	3	
Ian MacKenzie	England	DF	1969–1974	52	4	56	3	
Marcelo	Portugal	FW	1997–1999	61	22	83	33	
Nicky Marker	England	MF	1997–1999	78	1	79	5	
Brian Marwood	England	MF	1990–1992	17	10	27	3	
Wally Masterman	England	MF	1914–1919	42	0	42	14	
Tom McAlister	Scotland	GK	1972–1975	80	0	80	0	
David McAllister	Republic of Ireland	MF	2011–2013	18	12	30	4	
Stuart McCall	Scotland	MF	2002–2004	86	4	90	2	
James McCourt	Scotland	DF	1921–1924	66	0	66	4	
Kevin McDonald	Scotland	MF	2011–2013	89	2	91	5	
Stephen McGinn†	Scotland	MF	2013–	31	10	41	0	
James McGuire	Scotland	DF	1906–1912	63	0	63	1	
Ray McHale	England	MF	1982–1984	90	2	92	3	
Kenny McKay	Scotland	MF	1897–1898	28	0	28	5	
Andy McLaren	Scotland	FW	1949–1950	34	0	34	4	
Tony McMahon	England	DF	2012–2014	68	0	68	3	
Ken McNaught	Scotland	DF	1985–1986	41	0	41	6	
Archie McPherson	Scotland	DF	1934–1937	68	0	68	1	
Clive Mendonca	England	FW	1986–1988; 1991	13	15	28	5	
Bert Menlove	England	FW	1922–1926	81	0	81	43	
Arthur Mercer	England	FW	1926–1927	38	0	38	14	
Shaun Miller	England	FW	2012–2014	17	18	35	9	
Joe Mitchell	England	GK	1909–1913; 1918 (guest)	38	0	38	0	
Tony Moore	England	DF	1979–1982	33	0	33	0	
Hugh Morris	Wales	FW	1893–1895	41	0	41	9	
Lee Morris	England	FW	1997–1999	16	18	34	8	
Mark Morris	England	DF	1989–1991	66	3	69	4	
Jamie Murphy†	Scotland	FW	2013–	61	14	75	10	
Christian Nadé	France	FW	2006–2007	9	19	28	4	
Kyle Naughton	England	DF	2008–2009	47	5	52	3	
Gary Naysmith	Scotland	DF	2007–2010	86	2	88	0	
Steve Neville	England	FW	1980–1982	54	11	65	7	
Joe Nibloe	England	MF	1959–1960	29	0	29	7	
Terry Nicholl	England	MF	1973–1975	16	11	27	1	
Shane Nicholson	England	DF	2001–2002	22	4	26	3	
Albert Nightingale	England	FW	1941–1948	80	0	80	21	
Nyron Nosworthy	Jamaica	DF	2010 (loan); 2010–2011 (loan)	50	1	51	0	
Billy Parker	England	DF	1900–1909	82	0	82	3	
Bert Parkin	England	DF	1942–1951	42	0	42	0	
Mark Patterson	England	MF	1995–1997	84	2	86	4	
Billy Peake	England	MF	1910–1912	27	0	27	6	
Jack Peart	England	FW	1908–1910	28	0	28	7	
John Pemberton	England	DF	1990–1993	76	1	77	0	
Martin Peters	England	MF	1980–1981	27	1	28	4	
Tom Phillipson	England	FW	1928–1930	61	0	61	27	
Tony Philliskirk	England	FW	1983–1988	74	21	95	22	
Jim Plant	England	MF	1920–1925	70	0	70	5	
Mark Rankine	England	MF	2003 (loan); 2003–2004	15	10	25	0	
Colin Rawson	England	MF	1953–1955	76	0	76	1	
Jimmy Revill	England	FW	1910–1916	68	0	68	4	
Bruno Ribeiro	Portugal	MF	1999–2000	16	14	30	1	
Derek Richardson	England	GK	1979–1981	55	0	55	0	
George Richardson	England	MF	1936–1938	37	0	37	9	
Paul Richardson	England	MF	1981–1983	44	1	45	3	
Walter Rickett	England	FW	1939–1947	77	0	77	19	
Alan Roberts	England	FW	1988–1989	46	6	52	2	
W. Robertson	Scotland	FW	1889–1891	38	0	38	12	
Wilf Rostron	England	MF	1989–1990	35	6	41	3	
John Ryan	England	MF	1980–1982	71	0	71	2	
Alex Sabella	Argentina	FW	1978–1980	88	0	88	10	
Bill Sampy	England	DF	1922–1926	37	0	37	10	
Georges Santos	Cape Verde	MF	2000–2002	40	28	68	6	
Dean Saunders	Wales	FW	1997–1998	54	1	55	12	
Andy Scott	England	FW	1993–1997	49	38	87	12	
Stefan Scougall†	Scotland	MF	2014–	21	4	25	3	
Stewart Scullion	England	FW	1971–1973	67	4	71	7	
Alf Settle	England	DF	1936–1943	77	0	77	2	
Billy Sharp	England	FW	2004–2005; 2007–2010	48	18	66	13	
Paul Shaw	England	FW	2004–2005	22	17	38	8	
Luton Shelton	Jamaica	FW	2007–2008	10	15	25	4	
Dennis Shiels	Northern Ireland	FW	1958–1964	35	0	35	10	
Neil Shipperley	England	FW	2005–2006	34	5	39	11	
Chris Short	Germany	DF	1996–1998	51	6	57	0	
Craig Short	England	DF	2005–2005	22	3	25	1	
Jock Smith	Scotland	FW	1951–1952	44	0	44	11	
Fred Smith	England	FW	1948–1952	63	0	63	23	
Joe Smith	England	DF	1910–1912	50	0	50	0	
Martin Smith	England	FW	1999–2000	30	3	33	15	
Paul Smith	England	MF	1981–1986	33	7	40	1	
Nigel Spackman	England	MF	1996–1997	23	4	27	0	
Gary Speed	Wales	MF	2008–2010	40	0	40	6	
John Spencer	England	FW	1954–1957	30	0	30	12	
Alec Stacey	England	DF	1933–1937	71	0	71	3	
Simon Stainrod	England	FW	1976–1979	68	12	80	15	
David Staniforth	England	FW	1968–1974	30	4	34	5	
Phil Starbuck	England	FW	1994–1996	27	13	40	2	
Jon Stead	England	FW	2007–2009	32	15	47	11	
Ned Stringer	England	DF	1889–1892	27	0	27	0	
Graham Stuart	England	MF	1997–1999	66	3	69	11	
Patrick Suffo	Cameroon	FW	2000–2002	16	22	38	6	
Charles Sutcliffe	England	GK	1924–1927	53	0	53	0	
Andy Taylor	England	DF	2009–2012	38	7	45	0	
Lyle Taylor	England	FW	2013–2014	10	15	25	2	
Paul Thirlwell	England	MF	2004–2005	28	8	36	1	
Des Thompson	England	GK	1955–1962; 1963	30	0	30	0	
George Thompson	England	MF	1907–1908	42	0	42	5	
Phil Thompson	England	DF	1984–1986	44	1	45	0	
Carl Tiler	England	DF	1997	31	0	31	2	
Mark Todd	Northern Ireland	MF	1987–1991	87	11	98	6	
Paul Tomlinson	England	GK	1982–1986	46	0	46	0	
Willie Toner	Scotland	DF	1951–1954	61	0	61	3	
Bert Trueman	England	DF	1911–1913	57	0	57	0	
John Tudor	England	FW	1968–1971	78	7	85	37	
David Tuttle	England	DF	1993–1996	68	0	68	1	
Gus Uhlenbeek	Suriname	DF	2000–2002	55	4	59	0	
Robert Ullathorne	England	DF	2000–2001; 2001–2002	43	1	44	0	
David Unsworth	England	DF	2005–2006	39	1	40	4	
Carl Veart	Australia	FW	1994–1996	55	21	76	18	
Michel Vonk	Netherlands	DF	1995–1997	43	0	43	4	
Ronnie Waldock	England	FW	1954–1957	60	0	60	10	
Andy Walker	Scotland	FW	1996–1997	23	22	45	22	
Kyle Walker	England	DF	2008–2009; 2009–2010 (loan)	34	1	35	0	
Sandy Wallace	England	FW	1891–1893	32	0	32	11	
Joe Walton	England	MF	1909–1911	62	0	62	6	
Ashley Ward	England	FW	2003–2005	29	8	37	5	
Jamie Ward	Northern Ireland	FW	2009–2011	48	23	71	11	
Simon Webster	England	MF	1988–1990	43	13	56	3	
Wally Webster	England	DF	1925–1930	36	0	36	0	
Gary West	England	DF	1980–1985	89	0	89	0	
Darryl Westlake	England	DF	2012–2014	21	6	27	0	
Norman Wharton	England	GK	1928–1930	77	0	77	0	
David White	England	MF	1995–1997	65	12	77	14	
Fred White	England	GK	1939–1949	55	0	55	0	
Cliff Whitelum	England	FW	1947–1949	43	0	43	14	
Trenton Wiggan	England	FW	1979–1982	33	5	38	5	
Steve Wigley	England	MF	1985–1987	24	8	32	1	
Marcus Williams	England	DF	2011 (loan); 2012–2014	37	13	50	0	
Lee Williamson	England	MF	2009–2012	71	18	89	20	
Jack Wilkinson	England	FW	1956–1957	30	0	30	17	
William Wilkinson	England	FW	1902–1908	63	0	63	7	
Peter Withe	England	FW	1985–1988	85	5	90	20	
Paul Wood	England	FW	1990–1991	21	9	30	3	
Peter Wragg	England	FW	1953–1956	65	0	65	21	
Alan Wright	England	DF	2003–2006	42	8	50	1	
Mark Yeates	Republic of Ireland	MF	2010–2013	30	26	56	7	
Alan Young	Scotland	FW	1982–1983	29	3	32	13	
Dick Young	England	DF	1936–1949	83	0	83	0	

== See also ==
- List of Sheffield United F.C. players
