= Philip Jones =

Philip, Phillip, Phil or Phill Jones may refer to:

== Sports ==
- Phil Jones (American football) (1946–2020), American football coach
- Phil Jones (footballer, born 1961), English footballer who played for Sheffield United in the Football League
- Phil Jones (footballer, born 1969), English footballer who played mainly for Wigan Athletic, see List of Bury F.C. players (1–24 appearances)
- Phil Jones (footballer, born 1992), English footballer
- Phil Jones (journalist) (active since 1990s), English sports journalist and television reporter
- Phil Jones (basketball) (born 1985), Virgin Islands basketball player
- Phill Jones (born 1974), New Zealand basketball player
- Phil Jones (umpire) (born 1960), New Zealand cricket umpire
- Phil Jones (rugby) (born 1977), English rugby league and rugby union footballer
- Phillip Jones (bowls) (born 1955), Norfolk Island lawn bowler
- Phillip Alonzo Jones, American football and basketball player and coach

== Politicians ==
- Philip Jones (American politician), member of the New Hampshire House of Representatives
- Philip Jones (MP) (died 1603), Welsh politician, Member of Parliament for Monmouth Boroughs
- Philip Jones of Fonmon (1618–1674), Welsh colonel in the Parliamentary Army
- Phil H. Jones (1874–?), American politician
- Philip Asterley Jones (1914–1978), British solicitor and politician
- Phillip Jones (politician) (born 1989), mayor of Newport News, Virginia

== Others ==
- Sir Philip Sydney Jones (1836–1918), Australian medical practitioner
- Philip Stuart Jones (1927–2004), radio and television producer
- Philip Jones (musician) (1928–2000), British trumpeter and brass chamber music ensemble leader
- Phil Jones (musician) (born 1948), American drummer, percussionist and record producer
- Sir Philip Jones (civil servant) (1931–2000), Welsh businessman and civil servant
- Philip Jones (priest) (born 1951), Archdeacon of Lewes & Hastings
- Phil Jones (climatologist) (born 1952), British climatologist
- Philip Jones (Royal Navy officer) (born 1960), British admiral and First Sea Lord
- Philip Jones (British Army officer) (born 1961), British general and constables of Windsor Castle
- Philip Jones (historian) (1921–2006), British medieval historian
- Philip Jones, Australian anthropologist, historian, author, curator of the South Australian Museum

== See also ==
- Philip Madoc (born Phillip Jones, 1934–2012), Welsh actor
