= Machent =

Machent is a surname. Notable people with the surname include:

- Arthur Machent (1910–1996), English footballer
- Stan Machent (1921–2012), English footballer
