= Settle (surname) =

Settle is a surname, and may refer to:

- Alf Settle (1912–1988), British professional footballer
- Alison Settle (1891–1980), British fashion journalist and editor
- Amber Settle, American computer scientist and education academic
- Benjamin Hale Settle (born 1947), American judge
- Eddie Settle, North Carolinan senator
- Elkanah Settle (1648–1724), English poet and playwright
- Evan E. Settle (1848–1899), American politician from Kentucky
- Henry Settle (1847–1923), British Army officer
- Jimmy Settle (1875–1954), English footballer
- John Settle (born 1965), American football player and coach
- Josiah T. Settle (1850–1915), American lawyer
- Keala Settle (born 1975), American actress and singer
- Martha Settle Putney (1916–2008), American educator and historian
- Mary Lee Settle (1918–2005), American writer
- Matthew Settle (b. 1969), American actor
- Michaela Settle (born 1964), Australian politician
- Mike Settle (born 1941), American musician and journalist
- Thomas Settle (North Carolina, 15th–16th Congress) (1789–1857), American politician, U.S. Representative from North Carolina from 1817–1821
- Thomas Settle (judge) (1831–1888), American judge and politician in North Carolina
- Thomas Settle (North Carolina, 53rd–54th Congress) (1865–1919), American politician, U.S. Representative from North Carolina from 1893–1897
- Thomas G. W. Settle (1895–1980), United States Navy officer
- Tim Settle (born 1997), American football defensive tackle
- Will Settle, English football manager

== See also ==
- Settles (disambiguation)
