= De Goey (surname) =

De Goey is a surname. It most commonly refers to Jordan De Goey (born 1996), an Australian rules footballer for the Collingwood Football Club.

Other notable people with the surname include:

- Ed de Goey (born 1966), Dutch footballer
- Len de Goey (born 1952), Dutch footballer
- Marijke de Goey (born 1947), Dutch visual artist

== See also ==
- De Goeij, surname
