= Central Combination =

English football league

The Central Combination was a short-lived football league in central England. The league was established in 1933 to create a stepping stone for clubs looking to progress from county leagues to the Midland League and initially had 17 members. However, after losing around a third of its members in 1935, the league was reduced to nine clubs. Although it gained an extra member for the 1936–37 season, the league folded in the summer of 1937.

== List of champions ==
- 1933–34: Nottingham Forest Reserves
- 1934–35: Heanor Town
- 1935–36: Ollerton Colliery
- 1936–37: Ollerton Colliery

== Member clubs ==
- Bolsover Colliery (1933–1935; 1936–1937)
- Burton Town Reserves (1935–1936)
- Chesterfield 'A' (1933–1937)
- Danesmoor Welfare (1936–1937)
- Grantham (1933–1934)
- Gresley Rovers (1933–1935)
- Heanor Town (1933–1937)
- Ilkeston (1933–1937)
- Kettering Town (1933–1935)
- Loughborough Corinthians (1933–1934)
- Mansfield Town Reserves (1933–1936)
- Matlock Town (1933–1935)
- Newark Town (1933–1936)
- North Derbyshire Ramblers (1936–1937)
- Nottingham Forest Reserves (1933–1935)
- Ollerton Colliery (1934–1937)
- RAF Cranwell (1933–1935)
- Ripley Town & Athletic (1933–1937)
- Staveley Welfare (1936–1937)
- Sutton Junction (1933–1934)
- Sutton Town (1933–1937)
- Worksop Town (1933–1935)
