= Fred Colling =

English footballer

Personal information
- Full name: Fred Colling (Note: Joyce's 2004 Football League Player Records lists the player as Frederick Collinge rather than Colling, but that spelling does not occur in contemporary newspaper sources. The only person of a similar name whose birth was registered in the Auckland district, which included his birth place of Crook, in the relevant timeframe was Fred (not Frederick) Colling, and the English National Football Archive gives that as the player's full name.)
- Date of birth: 23 November 1897
- Place of birth: Crook, County Durham, England
- Date of death: 15 April 1973 (aged 75)
- Place of death: Crook, County Durham
- Height: 5 ft 7 1/2 in (1.71 m)
- Position: Forward

Senior career*
Years	Team	Apps	(Gls)
19??–1921	Darlington Railway Athletic		
1921–1922	Darlington (Note: Infobox appearances and goals only include those in the Football League. Colling scored four goals in the 1920–21 North-Eastern League, but no source for his appearances in that league has yet been supplied.)	2	(1)
1922–1923	Durham City	14	(4)
- Shildon
- Chopwell Institute
- * Club domestic league appearances and goals

Fred Colling (23 November 1897 – 15 April 1973) was an English footballer who made 16 appearances in the Football League playing as a forward for Darlington and Durham City. He also played non-league football for Darlington Railway Athletic, Shildon and Chopwell Institute.

== Football career ==
Colling was born in Crook, County Durham, one of several children of Henry Colling, a coal miner, and his wife Sarah Jane. He played Northern League football for Darlington Railway Athletic, before joining North-Eastern League club Darlington in the second half of the 1920–21 season. After Darlington's election to the newly formed Northern Section of the Football League's third tier, Colling began the 1921–22 season in the club's reserve team, which took the place of the senior team in the North-Eastern League. He made his Football League debut in the fourth match of the campaign, on 17 September away to Chesterfield, replacing Bill Hooper at inside right. Darlington won 3–0; "the third goal, which came in the last minute, was scored by Collings [sic], who sent in a long, fast shot which deceived Mitchell". Hooper resumed for the next match, and Colling played only once more for Darlington in the League.

He signed for another Northern Section club, Durham City, in June 1922. He impressed in pre-season practice, and played regularly at inside right at the beginning of the campaign. He scored his first goal for Durham in their first win of the season, on 23 September against Accrington Stanley, and scored twice more in the next few matches, but played little in the latter part of the season and finished his Durham career with four goals from fourteen league appearances.

After leaving Durham City, Colling appeared for clubs including Shildon and Chopwell Institute. His application for a permit to resume amateur status was successful. While a permit player, he was caught up in the 1928 illegal payments crisis, in which several hundred amateur players registered to clubs under the auspices of the Durham County Football Association were suspended and deemed professionals for receiving "tea money" – payments, often very small, over and above reimbursement of the minimal legitimate expenses allowed. In evidence to the inquiry, Colling admitted that Darlington Railway had paid him up to £1 10s per match, and that as an amateur with Darlington he had received a minimum of 15s per match plus travelling expenses.

Colling was living in Crook at the time of his death in 1973 at the age of 75.
