= York City F.C. league record by opponent =

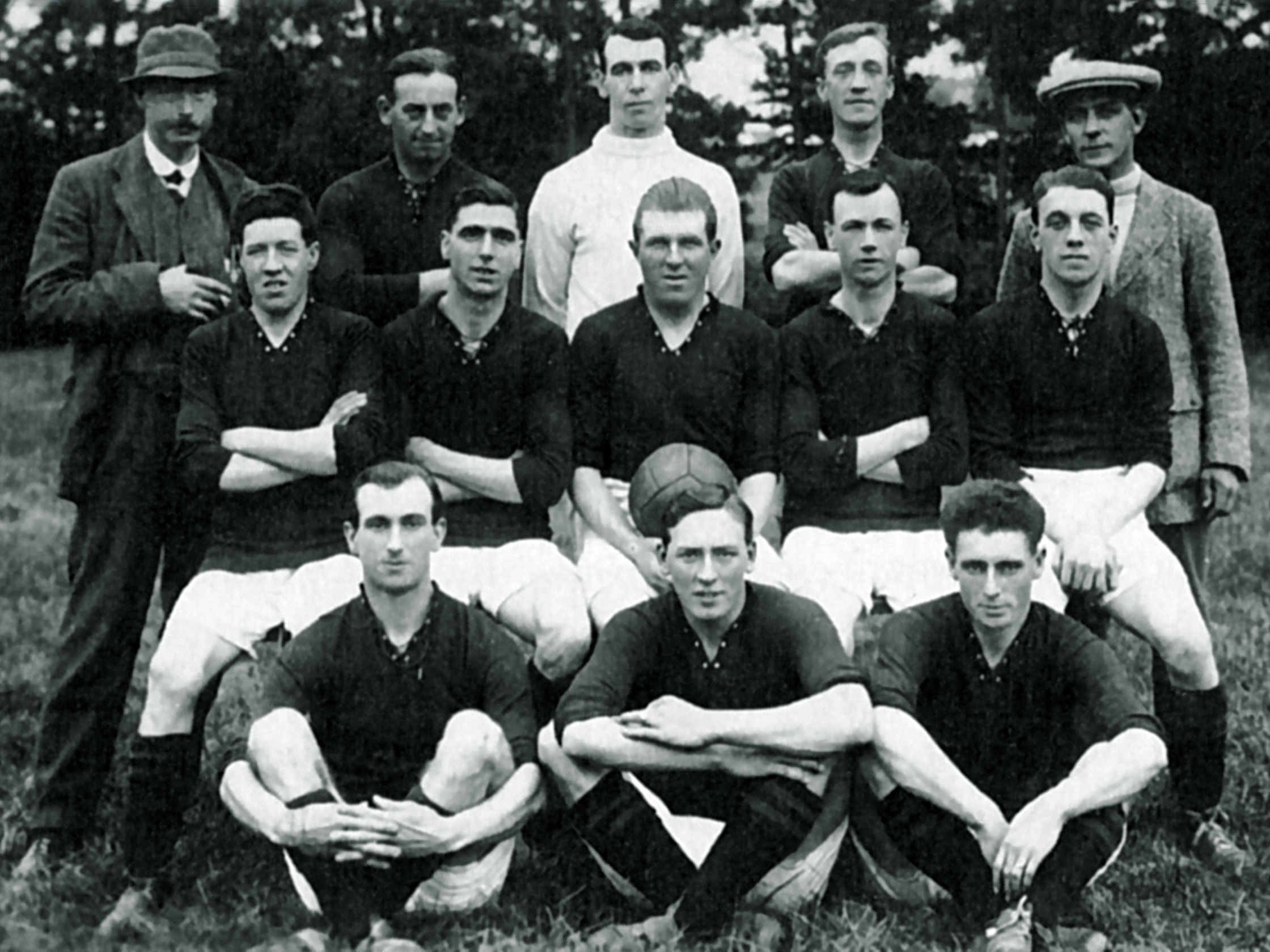
The York City team before the club's first home match, against Lincoln City reserves on 9 September 1922

York City Football Club is a professional association football club based in York, North Yorkshire, England. Founded in 1922, the club was elected to play in the Midland League, and competed in this league for seven seasons before being elected to play in the Football League in 1929 as members of the Third Division North. York were promoted to the Second Division for the 1974–75 season, which saw the team achieve their highest league placing after finishing in 15th place. York became the first team to reach 100 points in a Football League season after winning the 1983–84 Fourth Division championship with 101 points, the club's only league title. York were relegated to the Football Conference in 2004 after they finished at the bottom of the Third Division, ending 75 years of League membership. York returned to the Football League after eight years with victory in the 2012 Conference Premier play-off final, but were relegated to the National League four years later.

York City's first team have competed in a number of nationally contested leagues, and their record against each club faced in those competitions is summarised below. York's first league match was contested with Notts County reserves in the opening match of the 1922–23 Midland League season, with their first Football League match coming against Wigan Borough. They met their 200th and most recent different league opponent, Truro City, for the first time in the 2025–26 National League season. The team that York have played most in league competition is Rochdale. York have recorded more victories against Rochdale than any other club, with 48 wins from 111 matches. Halifax Town and Wrexham drew 34 of their 100 and 106 respective league encounters with York, more than any other club. The team have lost more league matches to Stockport County than to any other club, having been beaten by them 42 times in 90 encounters.

All statistics are correct up to and including the match played against Walsall on 21 November 2026.

== Key ==
- The table includes results of matches played by York City's first team in the Midland League, the Football League and the Football Conference/National League. Matches from the abandoned 1939–40 Football League season are excluded, as are play-offs and matches in the various wartime competitions.
- The name used for each opponent is the name they had when York City most recently played a league match against them. Results against each opponent include results against that club under any former name. For example, results against Scunthorpe United include matches played against Scunthorpe & Lindsey United.
- Win percentage is rounded to one decimal place.
- The columns headed "First" and "Last" contain the first and most recent seasons in which York City played league matches against each opponent.
- P = matches played; W = matches won; D = matches drawn; L = matches lost; Win % = percentage of total matches won
- † Clubs with this background and symbol in the "Opponent" column are York City's divisional rivals in the current season, the 2025–26 National League.
- ‡ Clubs with this background and symbol in the "Opponent" column are defunct. Reserve teams that York played in the Midland League are classed as defunct because they no longer compete in the English football league system.

== All-time league record ==
York City F.C. league record by opponent
Opponent	Home				Away				Total				Win %	First	Last	Notes
Opponent	P	W	D	L	P	W	D	L	P	W	D	L	Win %	First	Last	Notes
Accrington Stanley ‡	24	13	6	5	24	3	3	18	48	16	9	23	33.3	1929–30	1960–61	
Accrington Stanley †	7	1	3	3	6	1	3	2	13	2	6	5	15.4	2004–05	2026–27	
AFC Bournemouth	21	11	4	6	21	4	6	11	42	15	10	17	35.7	1959–60	2002–03	(Note: AFC Bournemouth statistics include matches played against the club under its former name of Bournemouth & Boscombe Athletic.)
AFC Fylde	4	2	0	2	3	3	0	0	7	5	0	2	71.4	2020–21	2024–25	(Note: Because of the COVID-19 pandemic, the 2020–21 National League North season was declared null and void in February 2021. York had played only 13 matches, which included one against this opponent.)
AFC Telford United	5	3	0	2	5	1	3	1	10	4	3	3	40.0	2011–12	2021–22	
AFC Wimbledon	6	2	0	4	6	2	0	4	12	4	0	8	33.3	2009–10	2015–16	
Aldershot ‡	22	11	6	5	22	7	7	8	44	18	13	13	40.9	1958–59	1990–91	
Aldershot Town	10	6	2	2	10	3	3	4	20	9	5	6	45.0	2004–05	2025–26	
Alfreton Town ‡	2	2	0	0	2	0	0	2	4	2	0	2	50.0	1925–26	1926–27	
Alfreton Town	5	2	1	2	5	4	0	1	10	6	1	3	60.0	2011–12	2021–22	
Altrincham	11	5	2	4	12	4	4	4	23	9	6	8	39.1	2005–06	2025–26	(Note: Because of the COVID-19 pandemic, the 2019–20 National League season was suspended in mid-March 2020. Six weeks later, the clubs voted to end the regular season programme with immediate effect; York's last eight matches, which included one against this opponent, remained unplayed.)
Ashton United	1	1	0	0	1	1	0	0	2	2	0	0	100.0	2018–19	2018–19	
Aston Villa	2	0	1	1	2	0	0	2	4	0	1	3	0.0	1971–72	1974–75	
Barnet †	11	6	2	3	12	4	0	8	23	10	2	11	43.5	1991–92	2026–27	
Barnsley	11	1	4	6	11	1	2	8	22	2	6	14	9.1	1932–33	1978–79	
Barnsley reserves ‡	3	2	1	0	3	1	0	2	6	3	1	2	50.0	1922–23	1928–29	
Barrow	35	19	7	9	35	11	12	12	70	30	19	21	42.9	1929–30	2016–17	
Bath City	2	1	1	0	2	1	1	0	4	2	2	0	50.0	2010–11	2011–12	
Birmingham City	1	1	0	0	1	0	0	1	2	1	0	1	50.0	1994–95	1994–95	
Blackburn Rovers	4	3	0	1	4	0	0	4	8	3	0	5	37.5	1971–72	1975–76	
Blackpool	17	8	4	5	17	5	3	9	34	13	7	14	38.2	1974–75	2000–01	
Blyth Spartans	3	2	0	1	5	4	0	1	8	6	0	2	75.0	2017–18	2021–22	
Bolton Wanderers	7	2	1	4	7	2	2	3	14	4	3	7	28.6	1971–72	1986–87	
Boreham Wood	4	0	4	0	4	0	3	1	8	0	7	1	0.0	2016–17	2025–26	
Boston Town ‡	7	1	3	3	7	1	2	4	14	2	5	7	14.3	1922–23	1928–29	
Boston United	8	3	3	2	8	1	0	7	16	4	3	9	25.0	2002–03	2024–25	
Brackley Town	6	4	1	1	4	1	1	2	10	5	2	3	50.0	2017–18	2025–26	
Bradford City	32	11	9	12	32	8	10	14	64	19	19	26	29.7	1937–38	2012–13	
Bradford (Park Avenue) ‡	16	11	1	4	16	5	3	8	32	16	4	12	50.0	1950–51	1969–70	
Bradford (Park Avenue)	4	2	0	2	5	4	0	1	9	6	0	3	66.7	2017–18	2021–22	
Braintree Town	4	4	0	0	4	2	1	1	8	6	1	1	75.0	2011–12	2025–26	
Brentford	19	8	6	5	19	4	5	10	38	12	11	15	31.6	1959–60	1997–98	
Brighton & Hove Albion	12	5	1	6	12	3	2	7	24	8	3	13	33.3	1963–64	2000–01	
Bristol City	11	2	3	6	11	0	4	7	22	2	7	13	9.1	1974–75	1997–98	
Bristol Rovers †	23	10	6	7	22	6	6	10	45	16	12	17	35.6	1965–66	2026–27	
Bromley	3	1	1	1	3	2	0	1	6	3	1	2	50.0	2016–17	2023–24	
Burnley	10	4	4	2	10	2	4	4	20	6	8	6	30.0	1984–85	1998–99	
Burton Albion	8	2	3	3	8	2	2	4	16	4	5	7	25.0	2004–05	2014–15	
Bury	16	6	6	4	16	2	2	12	32	8	8	16	25.0	1957–58	2014–15	
Cambridge United	18	9	6	3	18	6	4	8	36	15	10	11	41.7	1970–71	2015–16	
Canvey Island	2	1	1	0	2	0	1	1	4	1	2	1	25.0	2004–05	2005–06	
Cardiff City	8	3	3	2	8	1	2	5	16	4	5	7	25.0	1974–75	2000–01	
Carlisle United	44	21	17	6	44	9	16	19	88	30	33	25	34.1	1929–30	2025–26	
Castleford Town ‡	5	4	1	0	5	1	1	3	10	5	2	3	50.0	1922–23	1925–26	
Charlton Athletic	3	0	1	2	3	1	0	2	6	1	1	4	16.7	1972–73	1975–76	
Chelsea	1	0	1	0	1	0	1	0	2	0	2	0	0.0	1975–76	1975–76	
Cheltenham Town †	7	1	2	4	8	2	4	2	15	3	6	6	20.0	1999–2000	2026–27	
Chester	5	3	2	0	4	3	1	0	9	6	3	0	66.7	2016–17	2021–22	(Note: Chester City statistics include matches played against the club under its former name of Chester. The Chester F.C. founded in 2010 is a different club.)
Chester City ‡	38	20	12	6	38	7	10	21	76	27	22	27	35.5	1931–32	1999–2000	
Chesterfield †	42	16	14	12	43	6	11	26	85	22	25	38	25.9	1929–30	2026–27	
Chesterfield reserves ‡	3	3	0	0	3	0	2	1	6	3	2	1	50.0	1922–23	1928–29	
Chorley	4	1	2	1	3	0	1	2	7	1	3	3	14.3	2017–18	2021–22	
Colchester United †	12	9	1	2	12	2	3	7	24	11	4	9	45.8	1959–60	1998–99	
Coventry City	2	0	2	0	2	0	0	2	4	0	2	2	0.0	1958–59	1959–60	
Crawley Town †	8	3	5	0	8	2	1	5	16	5	6	5	31.3	2004–05	2015–16	
Crewe Alexandra †	44	25	9	10	45	13	12	20	89	38	21	30	42.7	1929–30	2026–27	
Crystal Palace	3	1	1	1	3	0	1	2	6	1	2	3	16.7	1958–59	1976–77	
Curzon Ashton	4	1	3	0	4	0	1	3	8	1	4	3	12.5	2017–18	2021–22	
Dagenham & Redbridge	11	3	5	3	11	5	0	6	22	8	5	9	36.4	2004–05	2024–25	
Darlington	55	33	15	7	55	14	13	28	110	47	28	35	42.7	1929–30	2021–22	
Denaby United ‡	8	6	2	0	8	1	3	4	16	7	5	4	43.8	1922–23	1928–29	
Derby County	4	1	2	1	4	0	0	4	8	1	2	5	12.5	1955–56	1985–86	
Doncaster Rovers	35	11	11	13	35	10	7	18	70	21	18	31	30.0	1922–23	2003–04	
Doncaster Rovers reserves ‡	2	1	0	1	2	1	1	0	4	2	1	1	50.0	1923–24	1928–29	
Dorking Wanderers	2	1	0	1	2	0	1	1	4	1	1	2	25.0	2022–23	2023–24	
Dover Athletic	1	0	0	1	1	0	1	0	2	0	1	1	0.0	2016–17	2016–17	
Droylsden	1	1	0	0	1	1	0	0	2	2	0	0	100.0	2007–08	2007–08	
Eastbourne Borough	3	2	0	1	3	0	0	3	6	2	0	4	33.3	2008–09	2010–11	
Eastleigh	5	2	1	2	5	2	1	2	10	4	2	4	40.0	2016–17	2025–26	
Ebbsfleet United	9	5	2	2	9	4	2	3	18	9	4	5	50.0	2004–05	2024–25	(Note: Ebbsfleet United statistics include matches played against the club under its former name of Gravesend & Northfleet.)
Exeter City †	27	13	5	9	26	7	5	14	53	20	10	23	37.7	1958–59	2026–27	
Farnborough Town ‡	1	1	0	0	1	0	1	0	2	1	1	0	50.0	2004–05	2004–05	
Farsley Celtic ‡	1	1	0	0	1	1	0	0	2	2	0	0	100.0	2007–08	2007–08	
Farsley Celtic ‡	2	1	1	0	2	1	1	0	4	2	2	0	50.0	2019–20	2021–22	
FC Halifax Town	4	1	2	1	4	1	2	1	8	2	4	2	25.0	2022–23	2025–26	
F.C. United of Manchester	2	1	0	1	2	0	1	1	4	1	1	2	25.0	2017–18	2018–19	
Fleetwood Town †	4	1	0	3	4	1	2	1	8	2	2	4	25.0	2010–11	2013–14	
Forest Green Rovers	11	6	3	2	11	3	4	4	22	9	7	6	40.9	2004–05	2025–26	
Frickley Colliery	6	3	3	0	6	3	0	3	12	6	3	3	50.0	1924–25	1928–29	
Fulham	7	3	1	3	7	2	2	3	14	5	3	6	35.7	1974–75	1998–99	
Gainsborough Trinity	8	4	1	3	8	1	2	5	16	5	3	8	31.3	1922–23	2017–18	
Gateshead ‡	23	12	8	3	23	4	10	9	46	16	18	12	34.8	1929–30	1958–59	(Note: Gateshead A.F.C. statistics include matches played against the club under its former name of South Shields.)
Gateshead	10	5	2	3	9	3	2	4	19	8	4	7	42.1	2009–10	2025–26	
Gillingham †	20	8	7	5	19	4	8	7	39	12	15	12	30.8	1958–59	2026–27	
Gloucester City	1	0	1	0	2	1	0	1	3	1	1	1	33.3	2019–20	2021–22	
Grantham	4	1	1	2	4	0	3	1	8	1	4	3	12.5	1925–26	1928–29	
Grays Athletic	5	1	2	2	5	2	2	1	10	3	4	3	30.0	2005–06	2009–10	
Grimsby Town †	21	4	10	7	22	3	5	14	43	7	15	21	16.3	1951–52	2026–27	
Grimsby Town reserves ‡	4	1	3	0	4	1	0	3	8	2	3	3	25.0	1922–23	1928–29	
Guiseley	5	3	1	1	4	1	2	1	9	4	3	2	44.4	2016–17	2021–22	
Halifax Town ‡	50	26	17	7	50	15	17	18	100	41	34	25	41.0	1929–30	2007–08	
Harrogate Town	1	0	0	1	1	0	0	1	2	0	0	2	0.0	2017–18	2017–18	
Hartlepool United	53	29	14	10	53	14	10	29	106	43	24	39	40.6	1929–30	2025–26	(Note: Hartlepool United statistics include matches played against the club under its former names of Hartlepools United and Hartlepool.)
Hayes & Yeading United	3	3	0	0	3	2	1	0	6	5	1	0	83.3	2009–10	2011–12	
Heanor Town	2	1	1	0	2	0	1	1	4	1	2	1	25.0	1926–27	1927–28	
Hereford	3	0	0	3	3	0	3	0	6	0	3	3	0.0	2018–19	2021–22	
Hereford United ‡	14	8	1	5	14	2	4	8	28	10	5	13	35.7	1973–74	2005–06	
Histon	4	2	1	1	4	1	2	1	8	3	3	2	37.5	2007–08	2010–11	
Huddersfield Town	7	2	1	4	7	3	1	3	14	5	2	7	35.7	1973–74	2003–04	
Hull City	25	9	7	9	25	6	8	11	50	15	15	20	30.0	1930–31	2003–04	
Hull City reserves ‡	3	1	1	1	3	0	3	0	6	1	4	1	16.7	1922–23	1928–29	
Ilkeston United ‡	3	3	0	0	3	0	1	2	6	3	1	2	50.0	1925–26	1927–28	
Kettering Town	7	4	1	2	6	2	2	2	13	6	3	4	46.2	2008–09	2021–22	
Kidderminster Harriers	16	4	6	6	17	4	5	8	33	8	11	14	24.2	2000–01	2023–24	
King's Lynn Town	1	1	0	0	1	0	0	1	2	1	0	1	50.0	2019–20	2019–20	
Leamington	4	2	2	0	4	1	1	2	8	3	3	2	37.5	2017–18	2021–22	
Leigh RMI	1	0	1	0	1	1	0	0	2	1	1	0	50.0	2004–05	2004–05	
Lewes	1	1	0	0	1	0	1	0	2	1	1	0	50.0	2008–09	2008–09	
Leyton Orient	12	6	3	3	12	4	3	5	24	10	6	8	41.7	1974–75	2015–16	(Note: Leyton Orient statistics include matches played against the club under its former name of Orient.)
Lincoln City	39	20	11	8	39	9	10	20	78	29	21	28	37.2	1929–30	2016–17	
Lincoln City reserves ‡	7	5	2	0	7	1	2	4	14	6	4	4	42.9	1922–23	1928–29	
Long Eaton ‡	2	1	1	0	2	0	2	0	4	1	3	0	25.0	1925–26	1926–27	
Loughborough Corinthians ‡	4	1	3	0	4	1	0	3	8	2	3	3	25.0	1925–26	1928–29	
Luton Town	12	3	5	4	12	1	3	8	24	4	8	12	16.7	1966–67	2015–16	
Macclesfield Town ‡	7	3	0	4	7	3	3	1	14	6	3	5	42.9	1998–99	2016–17	
Maidenhead United	3	1	1	1	3	2	1	0	6	3	2	1	50.0	2022–23	2024–25	
Maidstone United ‡	3	0	2	1	3	0	0	3	6	0	2	4	0.0	1989–90	1991–92	
Maidstone United	2	1	1	0	2	0	1	1	4	1	2	1	25.0	2016–17	2022–23	
Manchester City	1	1	0	0	1	0	0	1	2	1	0	1	50.0	1998–99	1998–99	
Manchester United	1	0	0	1	1	0	0	1	2	0	0	2	0.0	1974–75	1974–75	
Mansfield Town	47	25	10	12	47	12	8	27	94	37	18	39	39.4	1922–23	2015–16	
Mexborough Athletic ‡	8	2	3	3	8	4	1	3	16	6	4	6	37.5	1922–23	1928–29	(Note: Mexborough Athletic statistics include matches played against the club under its former name of Mexborough.)
Middlesbrough	1	1	0	0	1	0	0	1	2	1	0	1	50.0	1986–87	1986–87	
Millwall	10	6	2	2	10	2	2	6	20	8	4	8	40.0	1958–59	1998–99	
Morecambe	8	5	1	2	8	2	4	2	16	7	5	4	43.8	2004–05	2025–26	
Nelson	2	2	0	0	2	1	0	1	4	3	0	1	75.0	1929–30	1930–31	
New Brighton ‡	15	14	0	1	15	4	2	9	30	18	2	10	60.0	1929–30	1950–51	
Newark ‡	4	3	0	1	4	2	0	2	8	5	0	3	62.5	1925–26	1928–29	
Newport County ‡	15	12	1	2	15	3	6	6	30	15	7	8	50.0	1959–60	1986–87	
Newport County †	5	2	1	2	6	1	1	4	11	3	2	6	27.3	2010–11	2026–27	
North Ferriby United ‡	2	1	0	1	2	2	0	0	4	3	0	1	75.0	2016–17	2017–18	
Northampton Town †	25	9	8	8	24	4	7	13	49	13	15	21	26.5	1958–59	2026–27	
Northwich Victoria	4	1	2	1	4	2	1	1	8	3	3	2	37.5	2004–05	2008–09	
Norwich City	2	1	0	1	2	1	0	1	4	2	0	2	50.0	1959–60	1974–75	
Nottingham Forest	2	1	1	0	2	0	0	2	4	1	1	2	25.0	1974–75	1975–76	
Nottingham Forest reserves ‡	4	1	2	1	4	1	1	2	8	2	3	3	25.0	1922–23	1928–29	
Notts County	18	5	6	7	18	2	5	11	36	7	11	18	19.4	1964–65	2022–23	
Notts County reserves ‡	4	2	1	1	4	0	2	2	8	2	3	3	25.0	1922–23	1928–29	
Nuneaton Borough ‡	2	2	0	0	2	0	1	1	4	2	1	1	50.0	2017–18	2018–19	(Note: Nuneaton Borough statistics include matches played against the club under its former name of Nuneaton Town.)
Oldham Athletic †	32	15	13	4	32	5	7	20	64	20	20	24	31.3	1935–36	2024–25	
Oxford City	1	1	0	0	1	1	0	0	2	2	0	0	100.0	2023–24	2023–24	
Oxford United	20	7	5	8	20	4	6	10	40	11	11	18	27.5	1962–63	2015–16	
Peterborough United	18	10	4	4	18	3	5	10	36	13	9	14	36.1	1960–61	1999–2000	
Plymouth Argyle	17	5	8	4	17	3	6	8	34	8	14	12	23.5	1971–72	2015–16	
Portsmouth	8	6	1	1	8	2	2	4	16	8	3	5	50.0	1974–75	2015–16	
Port Vale †	25	14	4	7	24	3	8	13	49	17	12	20	34.7	1929–30	2026–27	
Preston North End	6	2	1	3	6	1	0	5	12	3	1	8	25.0	1976–77	1998–99	
Queens Park Rangers	2	1	1	0	2	0	1	1	4	1	2	1	25.0	1959–60	1965–66	
Reading	10	2	4	4	10	1	2	7	20	3	6	11	15.0	1959–60	1998–99	
Rochdale †	55	25	13	17	56	23	9	24	111	48	22	41	43.2	1929–30	2026–27	
Rotherham County reserves ‡	2	0	0	2	2	1	0	1	4	1	0	3	25.0	1922–23	1923–24	
Rotherham Town ‡	4	3	1	0	4	1	2	1	8	4	3	1	50.0	1922–23	1924–25	
Rotherham United †	30	15	8	7	31	6	7	18	61	21	15	25	34.4	1929–30	2026–27	
Rotherham United reserves ‡	2	0	0	2	2	1	0	1	4	1	0	3	25.0	1928–29	1928–29	
Rushden & Diamonds ‡	7	3	2	2	7	3	1	3	14	6	3	5	42.9	2001–02	2010–11	
Salford City †	1	1	0	0	1	0	0	1	2	1	0	1	50.0	2017–18	2017–18	
Salisbury City ‡	3	0	1	2	3	0	1	2	6	0	2	4	0.0	2007–08	2009–10	
Scarborough ‡	9	6	1	2	9	1	3	5	18	7	4	7	38.9	1927–28	2005–06	
Scunthorpe United	38	17	8	13	38	9	10	19	76	26	18	32	34.2	1922–23	2025–26	(Note: Scunthorpe United statistics include matches played against the club under its former name of Scunthorpe & Lindsey United.)
Sheffield United	1	0	0	1	1	0	0	1	2	0	0	2	0.0	1981–82	1981–82	
Sheffield Wednesday	2	1	0	1	2	0	0	2	4	1	0	3	25.0	1974–75	1976–77	
Shirebrook ‡	4	4	0	0	4	2	0	2	8	6	0	2	75.0	1925–26	1928–29	
Shrewsbury Town †	17	8	4	5	17	2	3	12	34	10	7	17	29.4	1950–51	2014–15	
Solihull Moors	5	2	1	2	5	3	1	1	10	5	2	3	50.0	2016–17	2025–26	
Southampton	3	1	2	0	3	0	0	3	6	1	2	3	16.7	1959–60	1975–76	
Southend United	26	13	6	7	26	5	9	12	52	18	15	19	34.6	1959–60	2025–26	
Southport	41	22	9	10	42	14	14	14	83	36	23	24	43.4	1929–30	2021–22	
Spennymoor Town	4	1	2	1	4	3	0	1	8	4	2	2	50.0	2017–18	2021–22	
St Albans City	1	0	1	0	1	0	0	1	2	0	1	1	0.0	2006–07	2006–07	
Stafford Rangers	2	1	1	0	2	1	1	0	4	2	2	0	50.0	2006–07	2007–08	
Staveley Welfare ‡	2	2	0	0	2	0	1	1	4	2	1	1	50.0	1927–28	1928–29	
Stevenage	8	2	1	5	8	2	4	2	16	4	5	7	25.0	2004–05	2015–16	(Note: Stevenage statistics include matches played against the club under its former name of Stevenage Borough.)
Stockport County	45	23	11	11	45	8	6	31	90	31	17	42	34.4	1929–30	2018–19	
Stoke City	1	0	1	0	1	0	0	1	2	0	1	1	0.0	1998–99	1998–99	
Sunderland	3	1	0	2	3	0	0	3	6	1	0	5	16.7	1974–75	1987–88	
Sutton Town ‡	4	3	1	0	4	1	0	3	8	4	1	3	50.0	1923–24	1926–27	
Sutton United	3	0	2	1	3	1	2	0	6	1	4	1	16.7	2016–17	2025–26	
Swansea City	16	10	3	3	16	6	4	6	32	16	7	9	50.0	1965–66	2003–04	(Note: Swansea City statistics include matches played against the club under its former name of Swansea Town.)
Swindon Town †	8	5	1	2	7	0	1	6	15	5	2	8	33.3	1959–60	2026–27	
Tamworth	9	4	2	3	9	4	3	2	18	8	5	5	44.4	2004–05	2025–26	
Torquay United	27	9	13	5	27	8	7	12	54	17	20	17	31.5	1958–59	2022–23	
Tranmere Rovers †	39	22	6	11	39	7	11	21	78	29	17	32	37.2	1929–30	2016–17	
Truro City	1	1	0	0	1	1	0	0	2	2	0	0	100.0	2025–26	2025–26	
Walsall †	24	10	7	7	23	3	6	14	47	13	13	21	27.7	1931–32	2026–27	
Watford	7	1	4	2	7	2	3	2	14	3	7	4	21.4	1958–59	1997–98	
Wath Athletic ‡	8	6	2	0	8	1	2	5	16	7	4	5	43.8	1922–23	1928–29	
Wealdstone	4	2	0	2	4	2	0	2	8	4	0	4	50.0	2022–23	2025–26	
The Wednesday reserves ‡	1	0	0	1	1	0	1	0	2	0	1	1	0.0	1922–23	1922–23	
West Bromwich Albion	2	0	0	2	2	0	1	1	4	0	1	3	0.0	1974–75	1975–76	
Weymouth	3	3	0	0	3	3	0	0	6	6	0	0	100.0	2006–07	2008–09	
Wigan Athletic	10	4	3	3	10	2	3	5	20	6	6	8	30.0	1978–79	1998–99	
Wigan Borough ‡	2	1	0	1	2	1	0	1	4	2	0	2	50.0	1929–30	1930–31	
Wimbledon ‡	4	0	1	3	4	0	0	4	8	0	1	7	0.0	1977–78	1982–83	(Note: Wimbledon relocated to Milton Keynes in 2003, and were rebranded as Milton Keynes Dons F.C. a year later. That club renounced all claims to Wimbledon's history in 2007, since when it has regarded itself as a new club founded in 2004.)
Woking	10	7	0	3	10	5	3	2	20	12	3	5	60.0	2004–05	2025–26	
Wolverhampton Wanderers	1	1	0	0	1	0	0	1	2	1	0	1	50.0	1985–86	1985–86	
Wombwell ‡	8	6	2	0	8	2	3	3	16	8	5	3	50.0	1922–23	1928–29	
Workington	17	7	7	3	17	1	6	10	34	8	13	13	23.5	1951–52	1970–71	
Worksop Town ‡	7	5	0	2	7	0	1	6	14	5	1	8	35.7	1922–23	1928–29	
Wrexham	53	28	17	8	53	8	17	28	106	36	34	36	34.0	1929–30	2022–23	
Wycombe Wanderers	9	5	3	1	9	1	2	6	18	6	5	7	33.3	1994–95	2015–16	
Yeovil Town	5	4	0	1	5	3	0	2	10	7	0	3	70.0	2003–04	2025–26	
