= Settle =

Settle or SETTLE may refer to:

== Places ==
- Settle, Kentucky, United States, an unincorporated community
- Settle, North Yorkshire, a town in England
  - Settle Rural District, a historical administrative district

== Music ==
- Settle (band), an indie rock band from Pennsylvania
- Settle (album), the 2013 debut album by Disclosure
  - Settle: The Remixes, the 2013 remix companion album by Disclosure
- "Settle" (Vera Blue song), a 2016 song by Australian singer songwriter Vera Blue

== People ==
- Settle (surname)

== Other uses ==
- Settle (furniture), a wooden bench
- SETTLE, a constraint algorithm used in computational chemistry

== See also ==
- Settling, a chemical process
- Settler, a person who migrates to a new area and resides there
- Settles (disambiguation)
- Settlement (disambiguation)
