= Menlove =

Menlove may refer to:

== People ==
- Bert Menlove (1892–1970), English association football player
- John Menlove Edwards (1910–1958), leading British rock climber and poet
- Coleen K. Menlove (born 1943), general president of the LDS Church from 1999 to 2005
- Ronda Rudd Menlove, American politician from Utah
- Vaughan v Menlove (1837) 132 ER 490 (CP), leading English tort law case that first introduced the concept of the reasonable person in law

== Music ==
- Menlove Ave., a 1986 album by English rock musician John Lennon
- 251 Menlove Avenue in Liverpool, England, named Mendips, the childhood home of John Lennon of pop group The Beatles
