= Settles =

Settles may refer to:

- Gene Settles (born 1953), American football defensive linebacker
- Ron Settles (1959-1981), American football running back
- Tawambi Settles (born 1976), American football player
- Tony Settles (born 1964), American former football linebacker
- Settles Hotel, a disused historic 15-story hotel in Big Spring, Texas

== See also ==
- Settle (disambiguation)
