= Jim Plant =

English footballer

Personal information
- Full name: James Edward Plant
- Date of birth: 1898
- Place of birth: Whitwell, Derbyshire, England
- Height: 5 ft 9 in (1.75 m)
- Position: Midfielder

Youth career
- Whitwell
- Cresswell Colliery

Senior career*
Years	Team	Apps	(Gls)
- Whitwell Discharged Soldiers
1920–1925	Sheffield United	55	(1)
1926–1927	Macclesfield Town	32	(3)
1927	Worksop Town		
1927–1929	Ripley Town		
1929–1931	Whitwell Old Boys		
1931	Whitwell Colliery		
- * Club domestic league appearances and goals

James Edward Plant (1898 – after 1930) was an English footballer who played as a right half or left half. Born in Whitwell, Derbyshire and a former soldier, he played in the Football League for Sheffield United.

== Career ==
Plant played as an amateur for a number of local sides while working as a miner before seeing active service with the Sherwood Foresters. Having been wounded while in the army, Plant was playing for Whitwell Discharged Soldiers when he was spotted by Sheffield United in January 1920 and offered a professional contract. Making his debut the following month in a 0–0 draw with Derby County, Plant remained at United for four and a half seasons, but never cemented himself in the first team. His best spell was a run of games playing at wing half during the 1922–23 season, but Plant was injured at the start of the following season and lost his place. Plant was eventually released in the summer of 1925 on medical grounds.

After a spell away from football Plant signed for Macclesfield Town in the summer of 1926, where he spent one season before joining Worksop Town in 1927. Plant's stay at Worksop was only a brief one and he drifted back into the amateur game, playing for Ripley Town, Whitwell Old Boys and finally Whitwell Colliery.
