= De Goeij =

De Goeij is a surname. Notable people with the surname include:

- Benno de Goeij (born 1975), Dutch record producer
- Fernanda de Goeij (born 2000), Brazilian swimmer
- Marco de Goeij (born 1967), Dutch composer

== See also ==
- De Goey (surname)
