= Matlock Town F.C. =

Association football club in Derbyshire, England

Coordinates: 53°08′13″N 1°33′06″W

Matlock Town
- Full name: Matlock Town Football Club
- Nickname: The Gladiators
- Founded: 1878
- Ground: Causeway Lane, Matlock
- Capacity: 2,400
- Chairman: David Hilton
- Manager: Nathan Haslam
- League: Northern Premier League Division One East
- 2025–26: Northern Premier League Division One East, 2nd of 22
- Website: matlocktownfc.co.uk
Home colours	Away colours

Matlock Town Football Club is a football club based in Matlock, Derbyshire, England. Nicknamed 'the Gladiators', they are currently members of the Northern Premier League Division One East and play at Causeway Lane.

== History ==
The club was established in 1878 as Matlock Football Club. They began entering the FA Cup in 1885, but did not win a match in the competition until 1890. In that year the club were founder members of the Derbyshire Senior League and went on to win the title in the league's inaugural season. After winning the league again the following season, they joined the Midland Amateur Alliance in 1892. However, the league was disbanded at the end of the 1892–93 season and Matlock returned to the Derbyshire Senior League. They subsequently joined the Midland League in 1894; after finishing bottom of the league in their first season, the club lost all 28 league matches in 1895–96 and left the league, again returning to the Derbyshire Senior League. They finished bottom of the league in 1897–98.

After the First World War the club was renamed Matlock Town. They joined the Central Alliance in 1924, but the league folded at the end of the 1924–25 season and the club rejoined the Derbyshire Senior League, in which they were runners-up in 1926–27. In 1933 they joined the new Central Combination, but left after two season. After the Second World War the club played in the Chesterfield & District League for the 1946–47 season, before the Central Alliance was re-established in 1947, with Matlock becoming members again. When the league gained a second division in 1950, they became members of Division One. Despite finishing bottom of the division in 1951–52, the club were not relegated.

In 1955–56 Matlock finished bottom of Division One again. The league was then reorganised, with the club placed in Division One North. They won the division in 1959–60, also reaching the first round of the FA Cup, losing 1–0 to Crook Town in a replay. After retaining the league title the following season, the club moved up to the reformed Midland League, which they won at the first attempt. They were Midland League champions again in 1968–69, subsequently joining the Northern Premier League. They reached the first round of the FA Cup again in 1974–75, losing 4–1 at home to Blackburn. In the FA Trophy the club reached the final at Wembley Stadium, in which they defeated Scarborough 4–0 to win the trophy; three Matlock players in the final were brothers, the only occasion on which three brothers have played for the same team in a Wembley final. The following season saw them automatically qualify for the first round, but they lost 4–1 at Wigan Athletic.

Matlock were drawn against Wigan in the first round of the FA Cup again in 1976–77, this time winning 2–0. They went on to beat eventual Third Division champions Mansfield Town in an incredible 5–2 away from home, marking the first time the club had defeated Football League opposition. In the third round they lost 5–1 at Carlisle United. The club won the Northern Premier League's Challenge Cup and the Peter Swales Shield in 1977–78. In 1979 they entered the Anglo-Italian Cup, finishing second in the English section. The 1983–84 season saw them finish as runners-up in the Northern Premier League. When the league gained a second division in 1987 the club became members of the Premier Division. Another FA Cup first round appearance in 1989–90 ended in a 4–1 defeat at Scunthorpe United. After finishing bottom of the division in 1995–96, they were relegated to Division One.

In 2003–04 Matlock were Division One runners-up, earning promotion to the Premier Division. They won the league's Challenge Cup the following season. A fifth-place finish in the Premier Division in 2007–08 led to the club qualifying for the promotion playoffs, in which they lost 4–2 to Witton Albion in the semi-finals. They finished fourth in 2021–22, going on to lose 2–1 to Scarborough Athletic in the play-off semi-finals. The following season ended with a fifth-placed finish and a 4–1 play-off semi-final defeat by Warrington Town. In 2024–25 the club finished fourth-from-bottom of the Premier Division and were relegated to Division One East.

The 2025–26 season saw Matlock finished as runners-up in Division One East, going on to lose 2–1 to Bradford (Park Avenue) in the play-off semi-finals.

== Ground ==
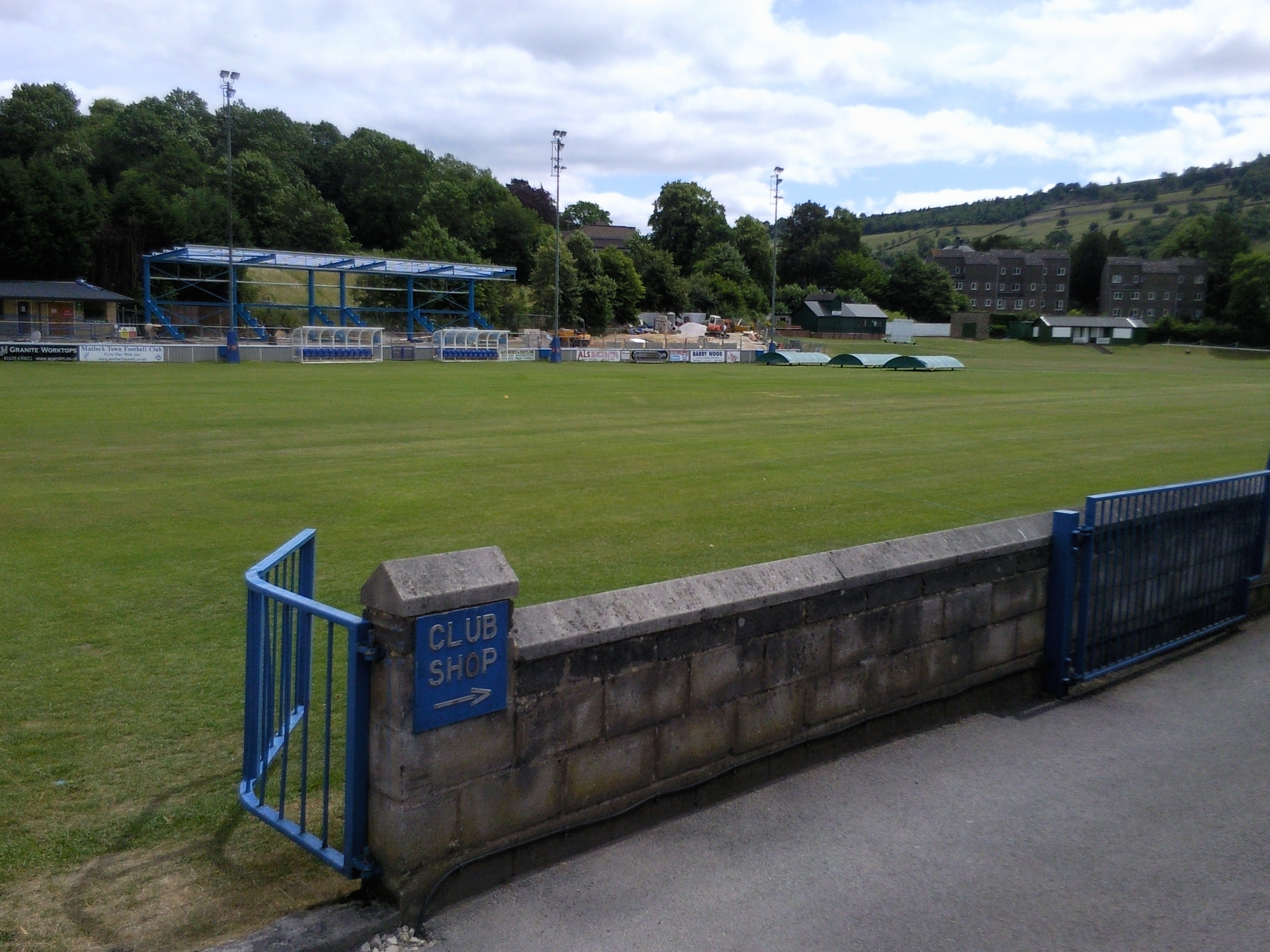
The club's home ground, photographed during the summer while development work was ongoing, 2010

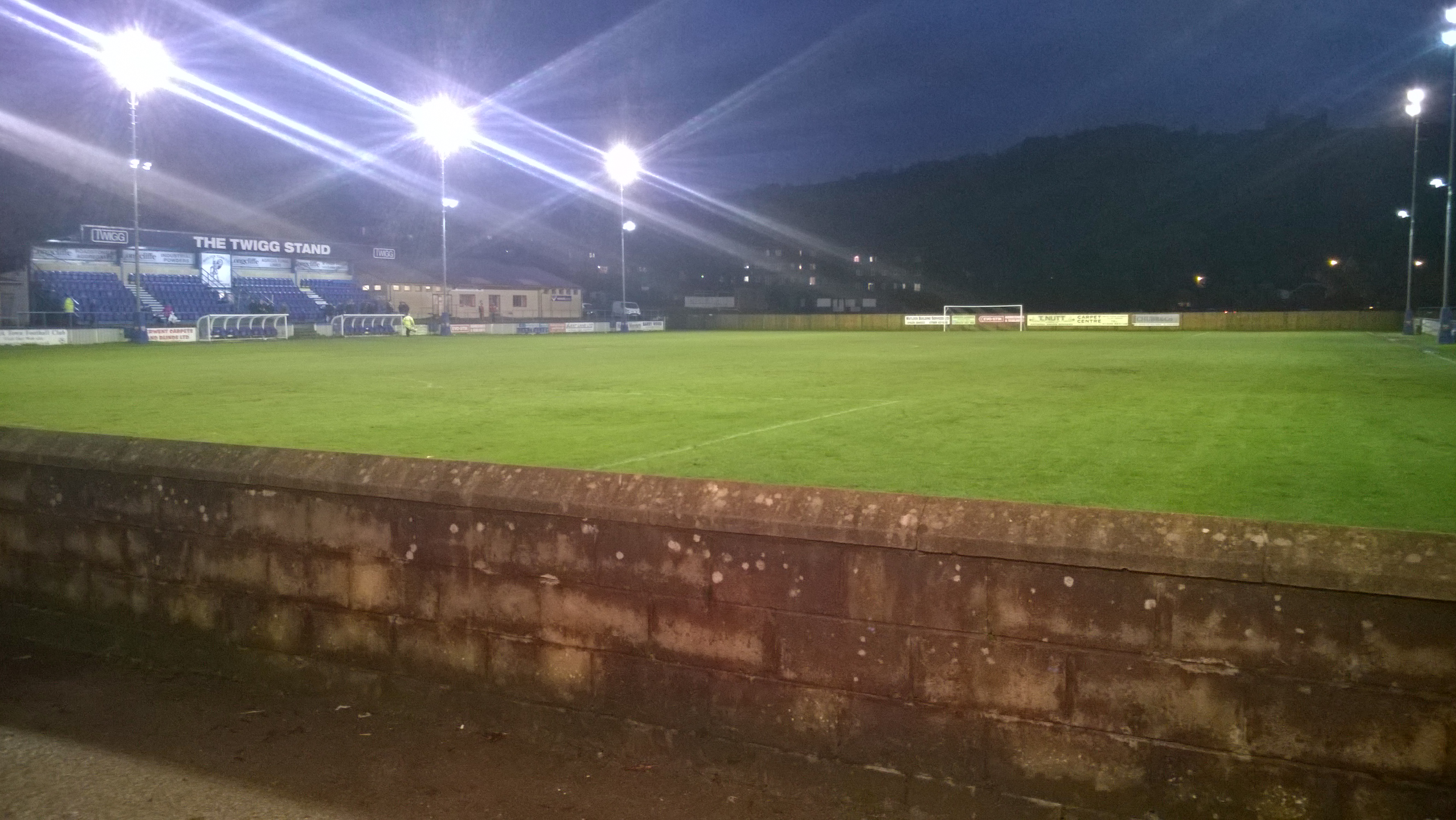
Main stand and bar/function area at far end. Riber Castle can be seen in the top right, 2014

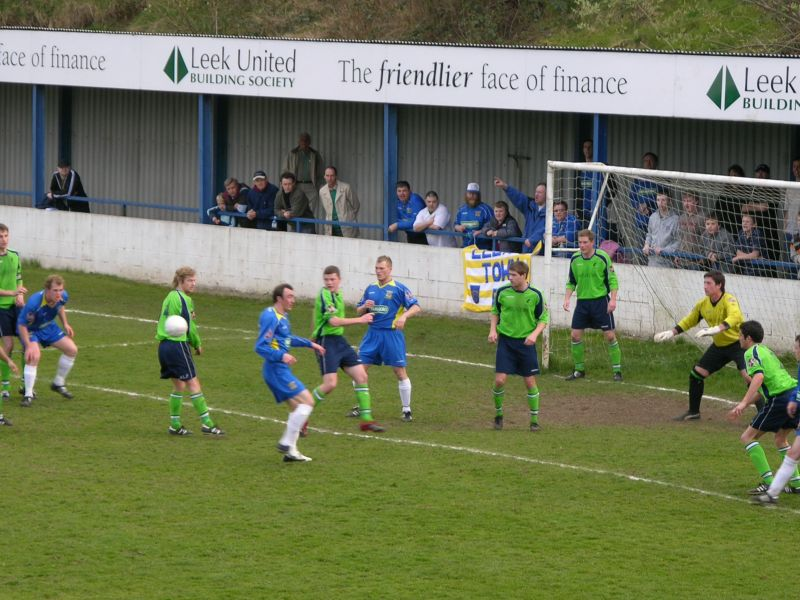
Matlock (green shirts) in action against Leek Town in 2007

The club originally played at Hall Leys, before moving to Causeway Lane, which is shared with the local cricket club, with temporary railing installed on one side of the pitch at the end of the cricket season. A wooden stand was built on one side of the pitch in 1920 and was later named the Cyril Harrison Stand. Another wooden stand was built on the other side of the pitch in 1959, with seats installed in the late 1960s.

Floodlights were erected in 1970 and a new terrace installed next to one of the stands prior to the FA Cup first round match against Blackburn in 1974, which attracted a then-record attendance of 5,123. More seats were installed in 1975 and that year saw a new record attendance of 5,123 set for an FA Trophy semi-final match against Burton Albion. A covered terrace was built at the Town End of the ground in the 1980s.

== Current squad ==
As of 5 November 2026

Note: Flags indicate national team as defined under FIFA eligibility rules; some limited exceptions apply. Players may hold more than one non-FIFA nationality.

Pos.	Nation	Player
GK	ENG	Marcus Dewhurst
GK	ENG	Dylan Parkin
DF	NED	Levi Andoh
DF	NIR	Pierce Bird
DF	ENG	Jo Cummings
DF	ENG	Billy Gough
DF	ENG	Jeremie Milambo
DF	ENG	Reuben Outram
DF	GHA	Bismark Owusu Osei
DF	WAL	Theo Robinson
DF	ENG	Tom Senior
DF	ENG	Louis Wajs
DF	ENG	Aiden Walker
MF	NED	Jed Abbey

Pos.	Nation	Player
MF	COM	Fouad Bachirou
MF	ENG	Brandon Bradbury
MF	ENG	Marshall Burke
MF	ENG	George Dooley
MF	ENG	Declan Eratt-Thompson
MF	ENG	Sam Giles
MF	ENG	Sonny Hilton
MF	ENG	Ethan Kachosa
MF	ENG	Arran Pettifer
MF	ENG	Ben Sault
MF	ENG	James Westwood
FW	ENG	Tommy Elliott
FW	NIR	Conor Washington

=== Out on loan ===
Note: Flags indicate national team as defined under FIFA eligibility rules; some limited exceptions apply. Players may hold more than one non-FIFA nationality.

Pos.	Nation	Player
FW	SKN	Keke Jeffers (at Grimsby Borough)
FW	COD	Manasse Mampala (at Ilkeston Town)
FW	ENG	Ryan McLean (at Worcester City)

== Honours ==
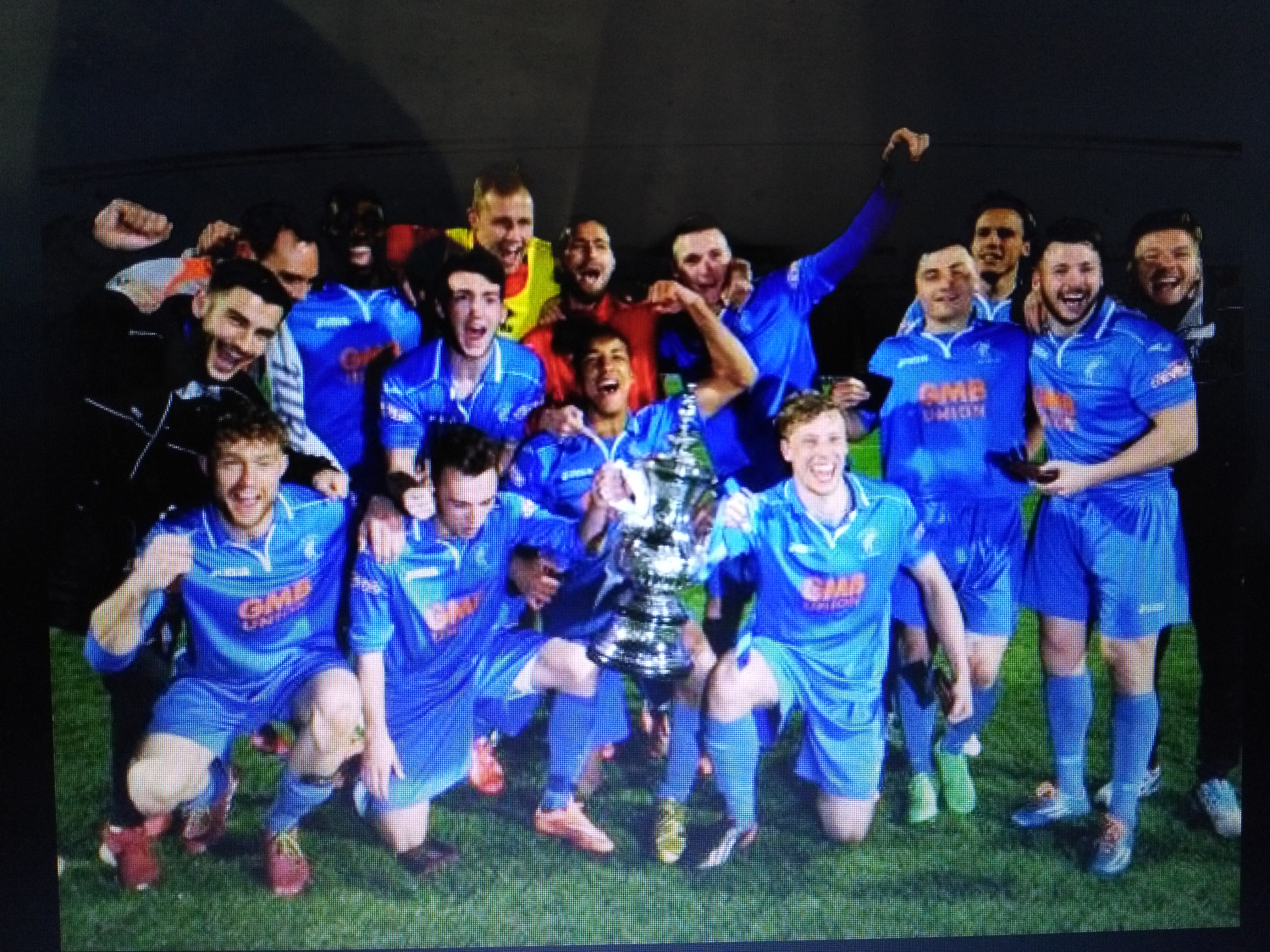
Matlock Town after winning the Derbyshire Senior Cup in 2015, beating Gresley 7–0.

- FA Trophy
  - Winners 1974–75
- Northern Premier League
  - Challenge Cup winners 1977–78, 2004–05
  - Shield winners 1978–79
- Midland League
  - Champions 1961–62, 1968–69
- Central Alliance
  - North Division champions 1959–60, 1960–61
- Derbyshire Senior League
  - Champions 1890–91, 1891–92
- Derbyshire Senior Cup
  - Winners 1974–75, 1976–77, 1977–78, 1983–84, 1984–85, 1991–92, 2003–04, 2009–10, 2014–15, 2016–17
- Evans Halshaw Floodlit Cup
  - Winners 1988–89, 1990–91

== Records ==
- Best FA Cup performance: Third round, 1976–77
- Best FA Trophy performance: Winners, 1974–75
- Biggest win: 10–0 vs Lancaster City, 1974
- Heaviest defeat: 8–0 vs Chorley, 1971
- Record attendance: 5,123 vs Burton Albion, FA Trophy semi-final, 1975
- Most appearances: Mick Fenoughty
- Most goals: Peter Scott
- Record transfer fee paid: £2,000 for Kenny Clark, 1996
- Record transfer fee received: £10,000 for Ian Helliwell from York City, 1987

== See also ==
- Matlock Town F.C. players
- Matlock Town F.C. managers
