= Phil Jones (footballer, born 1961) =

English footballer

Personal information
- Full name: Philip Howard Jones
- Date of birth: 12 September 1961 (age 65)
- Place of birth: Mansfield, England
- Height: 6 ft 1/2 in (1.84 m)
- Positions: Midfielder; defender

Youth career
- 1977–1978: Sheffield United

Senior career*
| Years | Team | Apps | (Gls) |
| 1978–1982 | Sheffield United | 28 | (1) |
| 1982–? | Boston United | | |
- Matlock Town
| 1989–1990 | Gainsborough Trinity | | |
- * Club domestic league appearances and goals

Philip Howard Jones (born 12 September 1961) is an English former footballer who played either in midfield or defence.

Born in Mansfield, Jones was a product of Sheffield United's youth system and was playing in the reserves as a fifteen-year-old in 1977. Signing as an apprentice in July 1978, Jones turned professional a year later and finally made his debut for United in February 1979 in a league fixture against Wrexham. Jones struggled to make the transition to the first team, his only real run in the side came during 1980–81 season as United were relegated to Division Four. After failing to make a first team appearance during the subsequent season, Jones was released from his contract in May 1982, joining Boston United. After leaving Boston, Jones joined Matlock Town for a spell before finishing his career with Gainsborough Trinity in 1990.
