= Phillip Alonzo Jones =

American football and basketball player and coach

Philip Alonzo Jones
Biographical details
- Born: August 25, 1895; Bangor, Maine, U.S.
- Died: January 16, 1968 (aged 72); Pompano Beach, Florida, U.S.

Playing career

Football
- 1915: Maine

Coaching career (HC unless noted)

Football
- 1919: Abraham Lincoln School
- 1920: McAllister School for Boys
- 1921: Mansfield
- 1922–1928: Rockland HS (ME)
- 1929–1949: Maine (Asst.)

Basketball
- 1921–1922: Mansfield

Head coaching record
- Overall: 6–1 (college football); 7–3 (college basketball)

Phillip Alonzo Jones (August 25, 1895 – January 16, 1968) was an American football and basketball player and coach. He served as the head football coach at Mansfield University of Pennsylvania in 1921. Jones was also the head basketball coach at Mansfield during the 1921–22 season.

== Early life ==
Jones was born in Bangor, Maine on August 25, 1895. He attended Bangor High School and the Dean Academy in Franklin, Massachusetts. He played two seasons of football at Dean and was team captain his senior year. He played football at the University of Maine and was an all-state fullback in 1915. He transferred to the University of North Carolina at Chapel Hill, then spent two years overseas as a member of the 103rd Infantry Regiment during World War I. After the war, he continued his education in England.

== Coaching ==
From 1917 to 1919, Jones was the athletic director of the 103rd Infantry Regiment. He then worked as a coach and physical instructor at the Abraham Lincoln School. He held the same position at the McAllister School in Concord, Massachusetts during the 1920–21 school year. In 1921, he became a coach and physical director at Mansfield Normal School. He left after one year to take the same position at Rockland High School in Rockland, Maine. which was closer to a boy's camp he owned and operated. In 1929, Jones became the freshman football coach at Maine. He remained a part of the school's coaching staff through the 1949 season.

== Personal life ==
Outside of football, Jones owned and operated the Hatchet Mountain Camp for Boys in Hope, Maine. He died on January 16, 1968 in Pompano Beach, Florida.
