= Gene Settles =

American football player (born 1953)

Spencer "Gene" Settles was a defensive linebacker for the UCLA Bruins during the 1971 - 1974 seasons. In 1974, he was the recipient of the UCLA Bruins' Henry R. Sanders trophy for Most Valuable Player (MVP).

== Biography ==
Spencer Gene Settles was born in Houston, Texas on 25 February 1953 to Paul Silas and Martha Ann Tate Settles.

Upon graduation in 1970 from B.C. Elmore High School in Houston, Texas, Gene was recruited by Notre Dame, Stanford University, University of Texas, Texas A&M, University of Oklahoma, Nebraska, the University of California at Los Angeles (UCLA), and others. He began his freshman year as a starting defensive linebacker with the UCLA Bruins in 1971 under the direction of coach Franklin Cullen Pepper Rodgers.

According to the UCLA 1972 "The Spirit Of College Football" publication, as a pre-law major sophomore, he was "rated a fine prospect and figures to back up Tom Daniels at RLB. He's tough and has a good speed, but obviously needs varsity game experience. Lettered in football under coach Wendell Mosley at B.C. Elmore High School in Houston, Texas. He won All-District honors at linebacker and also saw action at fullback." He is listed on the 1971 UCLA Alphabetical Roster as being jersey #59, 6'2", 226 pounds, and 19 years old.

In 1973, Gene was a junior majoring in Political Science. The "1973 UCLA Football News Media Guide" states this about Gene Settles: "Started in 5 games a linebacker last year and is tabbed to be starter at LLB this fall. He tied with James Bright as the team's most prolific tackler last year with 79. Had an excellent Spring practice and showed good leadership qualities. A solid all-around player, he continues to show steady improvement. Was a starting linebacker on 1971 Frosh team."

In 1974 UCLA hired-on a new coach with top credentials by the name of Dick Vermeil. According to the "1974 UCLA Football News Media Guide", Spencer "Gene" Settles was a senior majoring in economics. "He was a defensive inside linebacker (ILB), starting five games at left linebacker last year. He filled in when Rick Baska was injured in third game of the season (Michigan State) and did a fine job, bringing down 48 opposition ball carriers. Had a good Spring practice but was hampered by a sprained ankle for most of the practice period. He emerged as number two ILB behind Fulton Kuykendall but should challenge for starting position. He is a solid and valuable performer. Timed in 5.0 seconds for 40 yards without pads. Started 5 games at linebacker slot as sophomore and made 79 tackles after starting at LB for 1971 Frosh."
