= Arthur Machent =

English footballer

Personal information
- Full name: Arthur Machent
- Date of birth: 22 June 1910
- Place of birth: Chesterfield, England
- Date of death: 31 December 1996 (aged 86)
- Place of death: Chesterfield, England
- Positions: Right back; right half

Senior career*
Years	Team	Apps	(Gls)
–1929	Chesterfield Church Bible Class		
1929–1931	Chesterfield	3	(0)
1931–1938	Buxton		
1938–1939	Macclesfield	41	(0)
- * Club domestic league appearances and goals

Arthur Machent (22 June 1910 – 31 December 1996) was an English professional footballer who played as a right half and right back in the Football League for Chesterfield and in non-League football for Buxton and Macclesfield.

== Career ==
Born in Chesterfield, Derbyshire, Machent started his career with Chesterfield Church Bible Class before signing for Football League Third Division North side Chesterfield. He made three appearances for the club between 1929 and 1931, before transferring to Cheshire County League side Buxton. He spent seven years with the club before moving to Cheshire County League rivals Macclesfield. He was a virtual ever-present during the 1938–39 season, switching to right back on several occasions when Ron Hackney was unavailable. He made 47 appearances for the Silkmen in all competitions leaving the club in 1939.

== Personal life ==
His younger brother, Stan Machent, played as an inside forward for Sheffield United and Chesterfield in the 1940s. He died on 31 December 1996 in Chesterfield at the age of 86.
