= Ripley Town F.C. =

Association football club in England

Ripley Town
- Full name: Ripley Town Football Club
- Ground: Nottingham Road Playing Fields, Ripley
- Chairman: Dan Bradley
- Manager: Danny Cooper
- League: Central Midlands Alliance Premier Division South
- 2025–26: Central Midlands Alliance Division One West, 1st of 12 (promoted)

Ripley Town Football Club is a football club in Ripley, Derbyshire, England. They are currently members of the Central Midlands Alliance Premier Division South and play at the Nottingham Road Playing Fields.

== History ==
The club were founder members of the Derbyshire Senior League in 1890. They left the league in 1893, but returned a year later, before leaving again at the end of the 1896–97 season. They subsequently played in the Mid-Derbyshire League, which became the Derbyshire Alliance in 1907 and merged with the Notts & District League in 1908 to form the Notts & Derbyshire League, with Belper as founder members.

At the end of the 1908–09 season the club merged with Ripley Athletic to form Ripley Town & Athletic. They were champions in 1910–11, the final season of the league. In 1912 the club joined the Central Alliance, but left after a single season to rejoin the Derbyshire Senior League. By the mid-1920s the club had reverted to the name Ripley Town. In 1933 they were founder members of the Central Combination, going on to finish as runners-up in 1935–36 and 1936–37.

By the mid-1960s the club were known as Ripley Miners Welfare. They joined Division One of the East Midlands Regional League. after finishing as runners-up in Division One in 1969–70, the club were promoted to the Premier Division. They were Premier Division champions in 1972–73, before being renamed Ripley Town in 1975. In 1977 the club joined Division One of the Midland League. However, after finishing bottom of the table in 1978–79, they resigned from the league. The club subsequently joined the Midlands Regional Alliance, winning Division One in 1986–87.

A new Ripley Town was formed in 1999 when Butterley Brick and Ripley Town Colts merged. They joined the Premier Division of the Central Midlands League, playing in the division until a fourth-place finish in 2001–02 saw them promoted to the Supreme Division. Despite finishing in the top half of the Premier Division table in 2002–03, the club folded after losing their Brickworks ground.

Another Ripley Town subsequently emerged, again playing in the Midlands Regional Alliance. They were Division One runners-up in 2006–07, earning promotion to the Premier Division. However, despite finishing in mid-table in the Premier Division in 2008–09, the club were relegated back to Division One. They remained in Division One until withdrawing during the 2016–17 season.

In 2019 they joined Division One South of the Central Midlands League, in which they played for three seasons. After dropping into the Alfreton and District Sunday League, they returned to Division One West of the renamed Central Midlands Alliance League in 2025. The club won the division in their first season back in the league and were promoted to the Premier Division South.

== Ground ==
The club played at several grounds in its early history, including Nuttals Park, Radford fields and Nottingham Road. They currently play at the Nottingham Road Playing Fields, which is shared with Butterley United Cricket Club.

== Honours ==
  - Central Midlands Alliance
  - Division One West champions 2025–26
- Notts & Derbyshire League
  - Champions 1911–12
- East Midlands Regional League
  - Premier Division champions 1972–73
- Midland Regional Alliance
  - Division One champions 1986–87

== See also ==
- Ripley Town F.C. players
