= George Featherstone (English footballer) =

English footballer

Personal information
- Full name: George Featherstone
- Date of birth: 22 June 1884
- Place of birth: Middlesbrough, England
- Date of death: 1960 (aged 75–76)
- Position: Forward

Senior career*
Years	Team	Apps	(Gls)
- Darlington St Hilda's
- Darlington
190?–1908	Stockton		
1908–1909	Sheffield United	29	(11)
1909–1910	Brighton & Hove Albion	21	(8)
1910–1911	Hartlepools United	23	(11)
- * Club domestic league appearances and goals

George Featherstone (22 June 1884 – 1960) was an English footballer who played as a forward in the Football League for Sheffield United, in the Southern League for Brighton & Hove Albion, in the Northern League for Darlington and Stockton, and in the North-Eastern League for Hartlepools United. With Stockton he played on the losing side in the 1907 FA Amateur Cup Final.

== Life and career ==
George Featherstone was born on 22 June 1884 in Middlesbrough. He played football for Darlington St Hilda's, where he acquired a reputation as a scorer of spectacular goals, and for Northern League club Darlington. By 1905, he was on the books of Stockton. He helped them win the 1906–07 Northern League title as well as reach the 1907 FA Amateur Cup Final, in which they lost 2–1 to Clapton at Stamford Bridge after what was described as "a hard fought and spirited display". Stockton's goal came from the rebound after Featherstone headed against the crossbar.

Featherstone signed for Sheffield United on 25 February 1908; as part of the deal, it was agreed that he could leave on a free transfer at the end of the season if he wished. He made his debut in the following Saturday's First Division fixture, taking the place of Arthur Brown in the forward line, and scored the equaliser in a 2–2 draw at home to Woolwich Arsenal. He did not take up his option to leave, and by the end of the 1908–09 season had taken his totals to 11 goals from 29 league matches.

He then joined Brighton & Hove Albion on a free transfer. Despite a season disrupted by injury and a serious illness, he was a regular in the team when available, and scored 8 goals from 21 appearances as the team won the 1909–10 Southern League title. He left Albion in May 1910 – the club retained his registration each season until the war – to return to the north-east of England, where he spent a season with Hartlepools United of the North-Eastern League.

Featherstone died in 1960.
