= Staveley Welfare F.C. =

English football club

Staveley Welfare
- Full name: Staveley Welfare Football Club

Staveley Welfare F.C. was an English football club.

== History ==
The club were members of the Midland League in the late 1920s but resigned after three years of finishing in league's lower reaches.

They also competed in the FA Cup from 1936–37 to 1950–51, reaching the 2nd Qualifying Round on two occasions.
