= Len de Goey =

Dutch association football player

Personal information
- Full name: Leendert de Goey
- Date of birth: 29 February 1952 (age 74)
- Place of birth: Leiden, Netherlands
- Height: 5 ft 11 in (1.80 m)
- Position: Midfielder

Youth career
- ASC

Senior career*
Years	Team	Apps	(Gls)
1975–1976	Telstar	33	(2)
1976–1979	Sparta	97	(6)
1979–1980	Sheffield United	33	(5)
1980–1982	Go Ahead Eagles	48	(1)
Total		211	(14)
- * Club domestic league appearances and goals

Leendert "Len" de Goey (born 29 February 1952) is a Dutch retired footballer who played as a midfielder.

== Career ==
Born in Leiden, The Netherlands, De Goey began his playing career with hometown club ASC. He then joined Eredivisie outfit Telstar where he spent one season before moving to Sparta Rotterdam in 1976. After three years with Rotterdam he was signed by English side Sheffield United for £125,000 in August 1979 as they tried to build a side capable of achieving promotion from Division Three. De Goey made his United debut in a League Cup game against Doncaster Rovers a few days after signing, and although showing initial promise, both his and the team's form deteriorated as the season progressed. Deemed surplus to requirements, De Goey returned to the Netherlands in the summer of 1980, with Go Ahead Eagles paying a minimal fee for him, where he played for a further two seasons before retiring. Alongside friend and fellow former Sparta player Bert Jansen, de Goeij finished playing for amateur side UVS in Leiden.

After retiring he worked as a teacher at the Fioretti College and as a golf teacher in the Lisse area. He also was head coach of his childhood club ASC in the late 1990s.
