= Alf Settle =

English association football player

Personal information
- Full name: Alfred Settle
- Date of birth: 17 September 1912
- Place of birth: Barugh Green, Yorkshire, England
- Date of death: January 1988 (aged 75)
- Height: 5 ft 7 1/2 in (1.71 m)
- Position: Left-half

Senior career*
Years	Team	Apps	(Gls)
–1936	Barugh Green Rovers		
1936–1939	Sheffield United	73	(2)
1946–1947	Lincoln City	12	(0)
- * Club domestic league appearances and goals

Alfred Settle (17 September 1912 – January 1988) was a professional footballer who played for Sheffield United and Lincoln City as a left-half between 1936 and 1946.

Born in Barugh Green, Yorkshire, he started his career at his local club, Barugh Green Rovers. In 1936, Sheffield United paid Barugh Green Rovers a transfer fee £10 for Settle. He was transferred to Lincoln City in 1946, where an ankle injury ended his professional football career in 1947.
