= Joe Mitchell (footballer) =

English footballer

Personal information
- Full name: Joseph Thomas Mitchell
- Date of birth: 1 January 1886
- Place of birth: Darnall, England
- Date of death: 1964 (aged 77–78)
- Position: Goalkeeper

Senior career*
Years	Team	Apps	(Gls)
1906–1907	Darnall Congregationals		
1907–1909	Thorpe Hesley		
1909–1913	Sheffield United	36	(0)
1913–1919	Luton Town		
1919–1920	South Shields	1	(0)
1920–1921	Coventry City	29	(0)
1921–1922	Chesterfield	12	(0)
1922–1923	Barnsley	0	(0)
1923	Denaby United		
1924	Eckington Works		
Total		78	(0)
- * Club domestic league appearances and goals

Joseph Thomas Mitchell (1 January 1886 – 1964) was an English footballer who played in the Football League for Chesterfield, Coventry City, Sheffield United and South Shields.
