= Bert Menlove =

English footballer (1892–1970)

Personal information
- Full name: Bertie Menlove
- Date of birth: 8 December 1892
- Place of birth: St Albans, England
- Date of death: 3 July 1970 (aged 77)
- Place of death: Bridge, Kent, England
- Position: Centre forward

Senior career*
Years	Team	Apps	(Gls)
?–1919	Barnet & Alston		
1920	Aston Villa	0	(0)
1920–1922	Crystal Palace	65	(18)
1922–1926	Sheffield United	74	(41)
1926–1928	Boston Town		
1928	Aldershot Town		
1928–1929	Worksop Town		
1929	Bangor Athletic		
1929–1930	Clapton Orient		
1930	Coleraine		
1931–1934	Ashford Town		

Managerial career
- 1932–1934: Ashford Town (player-manager)
- * Club domestic league appearances and goals

Bertie Menlove (8 December 1892 – 3 July 1970) was an English footballer who played as a forward in the Football League for Crystal Palace and Sheffield United.

Born in St Albans, Menlove transferred in 1920 from Barnet & Alston to Aston Villa. He didn't make any league appearances for Villa and moved on to Crystal Palace, then of the Southern League. He scored his only hat–trick for Palace in a Southern League march versus Gillingham in March 1920. The following season Palace joined the newly constituted Third Division and with Menlove scoring five goals that season they topped the league and secured promotion to the Second division. Notable that season was an FA Cup win over then First Division Manchester City, a game in which Menlove scored. The following season Palace achieved a 6-0 FA cup win at first division Everton (this remains Everton's largest home cup defeat) with Menlove netting a couple. His tally of seven goals in the 1921–22 season for now second division Palace encouraged First Division Sheffield United to sign him in the spring of 1922.

During his spell (1922–1926) at Sheffield United in 81 appearances Menlove scored 43 goals (41 in the league) including two hat–tricks: against Tottenham in March 1924 and Birmingham in October 1925. Despite his goal scoring record Menlove did not play in Sheffield United's 1925 FA Cup Final winning team.

After leaving Sheffield United in 1926 Menlove joined Midland League Boston Town for a two season stay. In his first season there Boston Town were league runners-up.

Over the next few seasons he signed for a succession of clubs: at the start of the 1928-1929 season he joined Southern League Eastern Division Aldershot Town; by December 1928 he had moved to Midland League Worksop Town; a few weeks later, in early 1929, Menlove was at Bangor in North Wales with Bangor Athletic playing in the Wales National League (North). Menlove married whilst in the city; for the 1929–1930 season Menlove returned to London and signed-on with Football League Division 3 South Clapton Orient but featured mostly in their Southern League based reserve side; in December 1930 he crossed the Irish Sea to play with Irish League Coleraine

Then there came a period of stability for three seasons playing with Kent League Ashford Town from 1931 to 1932 to 1933–1934. In that first season the club were league runners-up and they scored an Ashford Town season record 115 league goals. He was appointed as Ashford's player-manager in April 1932

Menlove died in July 1970.
