= Stan Machent =

English footballer

Personal information
- Full name: Stanley Charles Machent
- Date of birth: 23 March 1921
- Place of birth: Chesterfield, England
- Date of death: 17 December 2012 (aged 91)
- Place of death: Brimington, England
- Position: Inside forward

Senior career*
Years	Team	Apps	(Gls)
–1938	Chesterfield Ramblers		
1938–1947	Sheffield United	22	(2)
1939	→ Buxton (loan)		
1947–1949	Chesterfield	21	(7)
1949–1951	Buxton		
1951	Hereford United		
1951–1954	Buxton		
Total		43	(9)
- * Club domestic league appearances and goals

Stanley Charles Machent (23 March 1921 – 17 December 2012) was an English professional footballer who played as an inside forward in the Football League for Sheffield United and Chesterfield and in non-League football for Buxton and Hereford United.

== Career ==
Born in Chesterfield, Derbyshire, Machent left school at the age of fourteen, and was an apprentice builder before he started his career with local side Chesterfield Ramblers. His form for the club alerted Chesterfield and Sheffield United, with Chesterfield offering him professional terms in 1938. However, Sheffield United later offered him a better offer and he signed for the Blades. In October 1939 he was loaned to Buxton, making his debut against Ashton National in a 4–3 win. His early career at the club was cut short due to World War II and he played as a guest player for Chesterfield during the war. He remained with United for nine years, making 22 appearances and scoring twice. In November 1947 he joined Football League Second Division side Chesterfield for £6,000 plus Dick Culshaw. Injury restricted him to just 17 games in his first season for the club, as he twice suffered a broken arm. In the fourth game of the 1948–49 season he suffered a knee injury which kept him out for the rest of the campaign. He was transfer-listed in 1949 and later dropped into non-league football re-joining Cheshire League side Buxton. Whilst at Buxton he was part of the side that reached the third round of the FA Cup in 1951–52, beating Aldershot in the process. In his second season for Buxton he scored an impressive 26 goals in 19 league games. In July 1951 he signed for ambitious Southern League club Hereford United. He struggled to compete for a place in the first team, only making two appearances and he mainly featured for the reserves. He spent three months with the Bulls but left in October 1951 due to travel commitments. He later returned to Buxton where he spent another three seasons. From 1954 he served as player-coach to Chesterfield's 'A' side that competed in the Yorkshire League, before the team disbanded at the end of the 1954–55 campaign.

== Personal life ==
His older brother, Arthur Machent, also played for Chesterfield in the 1930s. During World War II he served in the Royal Air Force as a radio and radar operator with RAF Coastal Command, later becoming a warrant officer with No. 120 Squadron RAF, serving in Canada, Northern Ireland and The Bahamas. After retiring from football he ran a shop in Chesterfield with his wife Vera, and later worked for the National Coal Board, and also as a maintenance joiner for the Derbyshire Health Authority. He died on 17 December 2012 in Brimington, Derbyshire at the age of 91.
