= England national football team results (1900–1929) =

- Win Draw Loss

This is a list of the England national football team results from 1900 to 1929.

== 1900s ==
=== 1900 ===
17 March Home Championship	Ireland	0–2	England	Dublin, Ireland
		Report	Johnson; Sagar	Stadium: Lansdowne Road

26 March Home Championship	Wales	1–1	England	Cardiff, Wales
	Meredith	Report	Wilson	Stadium: Cardiff Arms Park

7 April Home Championship	Scotland	4–1	England	Glasgow, Scotland
	McColl; Bell	Report	Bloomer	Stadium: Celtic Park

=== 1901 ===
9 March Home Championship	England	3–0	Ireland	Southampton, England
	Crawshaw; Foster	Report		Stadium: The Dell; Attendance: 8,000

18 March Home Championship	England	6–0	Wales	Newcastle upon Tyne, England
	Bloomer; Needham; Foster	Report		Stadium: St James' Park

30 March Home Championship	England	2–2	Scotland	London, England
	Blackburn; Bloomer	Report	Campbell; Hamilton	Stadium: Crystal Palace

=== 1902 ===
3 March Home Championship	Wales	0–0	England	Wrexham, Wales
		Report		Stadium: Racecourse Ground

22 March Home Championship	Ireland	0–1	England	Belfast, Ireland
		Report	Settle	Stadium: Balmoral Showgrounds

3 May Home Championship	England	2–2	Scotland	Birmingham, England
	Settle; Wilkes	Report	Templeton; Orr	Stadium: Villa Park

=== 1903 ===
14 February Home Championship	England	4–0	Ireland	Wolverhampton, England
	Woodward; Sharp; Davis	Report		Stadium: Molineux

2 March Home Championship	England	2–1	Wales	Portsmouth, England
	Bache; Woodward	Report	Watkins	Stadium: Fratton Park

4 April Home Championship	England	1–2	Scotland	Sheffield, England
	Woodward	Report	Speedie; Walker	Stadium: Bramall Lane

=== 1904 ===
29 February Home Championship	Wales	2–2	England	Wrexham, Wales
	Watkins; Davies	Report	Davis; Bache	Stadium: Racecourse Ground

12 March Home Championship	Ireland	1–3	England	Belfast, Ireland
	Kirwan	Report	Bache; Common	Stadium: Solitude

9 April Home Championship	Scotland	0–1	England	Glasgow, Scotland
		Report	Bloomer	Stadium: Celtic Park

=== 1905 ===
25 February Home Championship	England	1–1	Ireland	Middlesbrough, England
	Bloomer	Report	Williamson (-)	Stadium: Ayresome Park

27 March Home Championship	England	3–1	Wales	Liverpool, England
	Woodward; Harris	Report	G. Morris	Stadium: Anfield

1 April Home Championship	England	1–0	Scotland	London, England
	Bache	Report		Stadium: Crystal Palace

=== 1906 ===
17 February Home Championship	Ireland	0–5	England	Belfast, Ireland
		Report	Bond; Brown; Harris; Day	Stadium: Solitude

19 March Home Championship	Wales	0–1	England	Cardiff, Wales
		Report	Day	Stadium: Cardiff Arms Park

7 April Home Championship	Scotland	2–1	England	Glasgow, Scotland
	Howie	Report	Shepherd	Stadium: Hampden Park

=== 1907 ===
16 February Home Championship	England	1–0	Ireland	Liverpool, England
	Hardman	Report		Stadium: Goodison Park

18 March Home Championship	England	1–1	Wales	London, England
	Stewart	Report	Jones	Stadium: Craven Cottage

6 April Home Championship	England	1–1	Scotland	Newcastle upon Tyne, England
	Bloomer	Report	Crompton (-)	Stadium: St James' Park

=== 1908 ===
15 February Home Championship	Ireland	1–3	England	Belfast, Ireland
	Hannon	Report	Hilsdon; Woodward	Stadium: Solitude

16 March Home Championship	Wales	1–7	England	Wrexham, Wales
	W. Davies	Report	Woodward; Windridge; Wedlock; Hilsdon	Stadium: Racecourse Ground

4 April Home Championship	Scotland	1–1	England	Glasgow, Scotland
	Wilson	Report	Windridge	Stadium: Hampden Park

6 June International Friendly	Austria	1–6	England	Vienna, Austria
	Schmieger	Report	Windridge; Woodward; Hilsdon; Bridgett	Stadium: Cricketer Platz

8 June International Friendly	Austria	1–11	England	Vienna, Austria
	Hirschl	Report	Woodward; Windridge; Rutherford; Bradshaw; Warren; Bridgett	Stadium: Hohe Warte

10 June International Friendly	Hungary	0–7	England	Budapest, Hungary
		Report	Rutherford; Hilsdon; Windridge; Woodward	Stadium: Millenáris Sporttelep

13 June International Friendly	Bohemia	0–4	England	Prague, Bohemia
		Report 1 Report 2	Hilsdon 24', 50' (pen.); Windridge 55'; Rutherford 83'	Stadium: Slavia Letná Stadion; Attendance: 4,000; Referee: John Lewis (England)

=== 1909 ===
13 February Home Championship	England	4–0	Ireland	Bradford, England
	Hilsdon (-); Woodward	Report		Stadium: Park Avenue

15 March Home Championship	England	2–0	Wales	Nottingham, England
	Holley; Freeman	Report		Stadium: City Ground

3 April Home Championship	England	2–0	Scotland	London, England
	Wall	Report		Stadium: Crystal Palace

29 May International Friendly	Hungary	2–4	England	Budapest, Hungary
	Késmárky; Grósz	Report	Bridgett; Woodward; Fleming	Stadium: Millenáris Sporttelep

31 May International Friendly	Hungary	2–8	England	Budapest, Hungary
	Scholsser; Mészáros	Report	Fleming; Woodward; Holley	Stadium: Millenáris Sporttelep

1 June International Friendly	Austria	1–8	England	Vienna, Austria
	Neubauer	Report	Woodward; Halse; Holley; Warren	Stadium: Hohe Warte

== 1910s ==
=== 1910 ===
12 February Home Championship	Ireland	1–1	England	Belfast, Ireland
	Thompson	Report	Fleming	Stadium: Solitude

14 March Home Championship	Wales	0–1	England	Cardiff, Wales
		Report	Ducat	Stadium: Cardiff Arms Park

2 April Home Championship	Scotland	2–0	England	Glasgow, Scotland
	McMenemy; Quinn	Report		Stadium: Hampden Park

=== 1911 ===
11 February Home Championship	England	2–1	Ireland	Derby, England
	Shepherd; Evans	Report	McAuley	Stadium: Baseball Ground

13 March Home Championship	England	3–0	Wales	London, England
	Woodward; Webb	Report		Stadium: The Den

1 April Home Championship	England	1–1	Scotland	Liverpool, England
	Stewart	Report	Higgins	Stadium: Goodison Park

=== 1912 ===
10 February Home Championship	Ireland	1–6	England	Dublin, Ireland
	Hamill	Report	Fleming; Holley; Freeman; Simpson	Stadium: Dalymount Park

11 March Home Championship	Wales	0–2	England	Wrexham, Wales
		Report	Holley; Freeman	Stadium: Racecourse Ground

23 March Home Championship	Scotland	1–1	England	Glasgow, Scotland
	Wilson	Report	Holley	Stadium: Hampden Park

=== 1913 ===
15 February Home Championship	Ireland	2–1	England	Belfast, Ireland
	Gillespie	Report	Buchan	Stadium: Windsor Park

17 March Home Championship	England	4–3	Wales	Bristol, England
	Fleming; Latheron; McCall; Hampton	Report	Davis; Peake; Meredith	Stadium: Ashton Gate

5 April Home Championship	England	1–0	Scotland	London, England
	Hampton	Report		Stadium: Stamford Bridge

=== 1914 ===
14 February Home Championship	England	0–3	Ireland	Middlesbrough, England
		Report	Lacey; Gillespie	Stadium: Ayresome Park

16 March Home Championship	Wales	0–2	England	Cardiff, Wales
		Report	Smith; Wedlock	Stadium: Ninian Park

14 April Home Championship	Scotland	3–1	England	Glasgow, Scotland
	Thomson; Reid; McMenemy	Report	Fleming	Stadium: Hampden Park

=== 1919 ===
25 October Home Championship	Ireland	1–1	England	Belfast, Ireland
	Ferris	Report	Cock	Stadium: Windsor Park

== 1920s ==
=== 1920 ===
15 March Home Championship	England	1–2	Wales	London, England
	Buchan	Report	Davies; Richards	Stadium: Highbury

10 April Home Championship	England	5–4	Scotland	Sheffield, England
	Cock; Quantrill; Kelly; Morris	Report	Miller; Wilson; Donaldson	Stadium: Hillsborough

23 October Home Championship	England	2–0	Ireland	Sunderland, England
	Kelly; Walker	Report		Stadium: Roker Park

=== 1921 ===
14 March Home Championship	Wales	0–0	England	Cardiff, Wales
		Report		Stadium: Ninian Park

9 April Home Championship	Scotland	3–0	England	Glasgow, Scotland
	Wilson; Cunningham; Morton	Report		Stadium: Hampden Park

21 May International Friendly	Belgium	0–2	England	Brussels, Belgium
		Report	Buchan; Chambers	Stadium: Oscar Bossaert Stadium

22 October Home Championship	Ireland	1–1	England	Belfast, Northern Ireland
	Gillespie	Report	Kirton	Stadium: Windsor Park

=== 1922 ===
13 March Home Championship	England	1–0	Wales	Liverpool, England
	Kelly	Report		Stadium: Anfield

8 April Home Championship	England	0–1	Scotland	Birmingham, England
		Report	Wilson	Stadium: Villa Park

21 October Home Championship	England	2–0	Ireland	West Bromwich, England
	Chambers	Report		Stadium: The Hawthorns

=== 1923 ===
5 March Home Championship	Wales	2–2	England	Cardiff, Wales
	Keenor; Jones	Report	Chambers; Watson	Stadium: Ninian Park

19 March International Friendly	England	6–1	Belgium	London, England
	Hegan; Mercer; Chambers; Seed; Bullock	Report	Vlamynck	Stadium: Highbury

14 April Home Championship	Scotland	2–2	England	Glasgow, Scotland
	Cunningham; Wilson	Report	Kelly; Watson	Stadium: Hampden Park

10 May International Friendly	France	1–4	England	Paris, France
	Dewaquez	Report	Hegan; Buchan; Creek	Stadium: Stade Pershing

21 May International Friendly	Sweden	2–4	England	Stockholm, Sweden
	Dahl	Report	Walker; Thornewell; Moore	Stadium: Råsunda

20 October Home Championship	Ireland	2–1	England	Belfast, Northern Ireland
	Gillespie; Croft	Report	Bradford	Stadium: Windsor Park

1 November International Friendly	Belgium	2–2	England	Antwerp, Belgium
	Larnoe; Schelstraete (-)	Report	Brown; Roberts	Stadium: Bosuilstadion

=== 1924 ===
3 March Home Championship	England	1–2	Wales	Blackburn, England
	Roberts	Report	W. Davies; Vizard	Stadium: Ewood Park

12 April Home Championship	England	1–1	Scotland	London, England
	Walker	Report	Taylor (-)	Stadium: Wembley Stadium

17 May International Friendly	France	1–3	England	Paris, France
	Dewaquez	Report	Gibbins; Storer	Stadium: Stade Pershing

22 October Home Championship	England	3–1	Ireland	Liverpool, England
	Kelly; Bedford; Walker	Report	Gillespie	Stadium: Goodison Park

8 December International Friendly	England	4–0	Belgium	West Bromwich, England
	Bradford 17' 61'; Walker 60' 66'	Report		Stadium: The Hawthorns

=== 1925 ===
28 February Home Championship	Wales	1–2	England	Swansea, Wales
	Keenor	Report	Roberts	Stadium: Vetch Field

4 April Home Championship	Scotland	2–0	England	Glasgow, Scotland
	Gallacher	Report		Stadium: Hampden Park

21 May International Friendly	France	2–3	England	Paris, France
	Boyer; Dewaquez	Report	Gibbins; Bonnardel (-); Dorrell	Stadium: Colombes

24 October Home Championship	Ireland	0–0	England	Belfast, Northern Ireland
		Report		Stadium: Windsor Park

=== 1926 ===
1 March Home Championship	England	1–3	Wales	London, England
	Walker 47'	Report	Fowler 42' 60'; W. Davies 57'	Stadium: Selhurst Park

17 April Home Championship	England	0–1	Scotland	Manchester, England
		Report	Jackson	Stadium: Old Trafford

24 May International Friendly	Belgium	3–5	England	Antwerp, Belgium
	Thys; Braine	Report	Osborne; Johnson; Carter	Stadium: Olympic Stadium

20 October Home Championship	England	3–3	Ireland	Liverpool, England
	Brown; Spence; Bullock	Report	Gillespie; Irvine; Davey	Stadium: Anfield

=== 1927 ===
12 February Home Championship	Wales	3–3	England	Wrexham, Wales
	L. Davies; W. Lewis	Report	Dean; Walker	Stadium: Racecourse Ground

2 April Home Championship	Scotland	1–2	England	Glasgow, Scotland
	Morton	Report	Dean	Stadium: Hampden Park

11 May International Friendly	Belgium	1–9	England	Brussels, Belgium
	Vanhalme	Report	Brown; Hulme; Rigby; Dean; Page	Stadium: Oscar Bossaert Stadium

21 May International Friendly	Luxembourg	2–5	England	Esch-sur-Alzette, Luxembourg
	Hubert 12'; Lefevre 13'	Report	Dean 18' 63' 72'; Kelly 35'; Bishop 86'	Stadium: Stade de la Frontière; Attendance: 3,789; Referee: Paul Putz (Belgium)

26 May International Friendly	France	0–6	England	Paris, France
		Report	Brown; Dean; Rollet (-); Rigby	Stadium: Colombes

22 October Home Championship	Ireland	2–0	England	Belfast, Northern Ireland
	Jones (-); Mahood	Report		Stadium: Windsor Park

28 November Home Championship	England	1–2	Wales	Burnley, England
	Keenor (-)	Report	W. Lewis; Hill (-)	Stadium: Turf Moor

=== 1928 ===
31 March Home Championship	England	1–5	Scotland	London, England
	Kelly	Report	Jackson; James	Stadium: Wembley Stadium

17 May International Friendly	France	1–5	England	Paris, France
	Langiller	Report	Stephenson; Jack; Dean	Stadium: Colombes

19 May International Friendly	Belgium	1–3	England	Antwerp, Belgium
	Moeschal	Report	Dean; Matthews	Stadium: Olympic Stadium

22 October Home Championship	England	2–1	Ireland	Liverpool, England
	Hulme; Dean	Report	Babrick	Stadium: Goodison Park

17 November Home Championship	Wales	2–3	England	Swansea, Wales
	Fowler; Keenor	Report	Hulme; Hine	Stadium: Vetch Field

=== 1929 ===
13 April Home Championship	Scotland	1–0	England	Glasgow, Scotland
	Cheyne	Report		Stadium: Hampden Park

9 May International Friendly	France	1–4	England	Paris, France
	Dewaquez	Report	Kail; Camsell	Stadium: Colombes

11 May International Friendly	Belgium	1–5	England	Brussels, Belgium
	Moeschal	Report	Camsell (-); Carter	Stadium: Parc Duden

15 May International Friendly	Spain	4–3	England	Madrid, Spain
	Rubio; Lazcano; Goiburu	Report	Carter; Bradford	Stadium: Estadio Metropolitano

19 October Home Championship	Ireland	0–3	England	Belfast, Northern Ireland
		Report	Hine; Camsell	Stadium: Windsor Park

20 November Home Championship	England	6–0	Wales	London, England
	Johnson; Camsell; Adcock	Report		Stadium: Stamford Bridge
