= Scotland national football team results (1920–1939) =

Scotland national football team results
- 1872–1914 (matches 1–113)
- 1920–39 (matches 114–188)
- 1940–59 (matches 189–274)
- 1960–79 (matches 275–432)
- 1980–99 (matches 433–611)
- 2000–19 (matches 612–783)
- 2020–present (matches 784–849)

- Unofficial matches

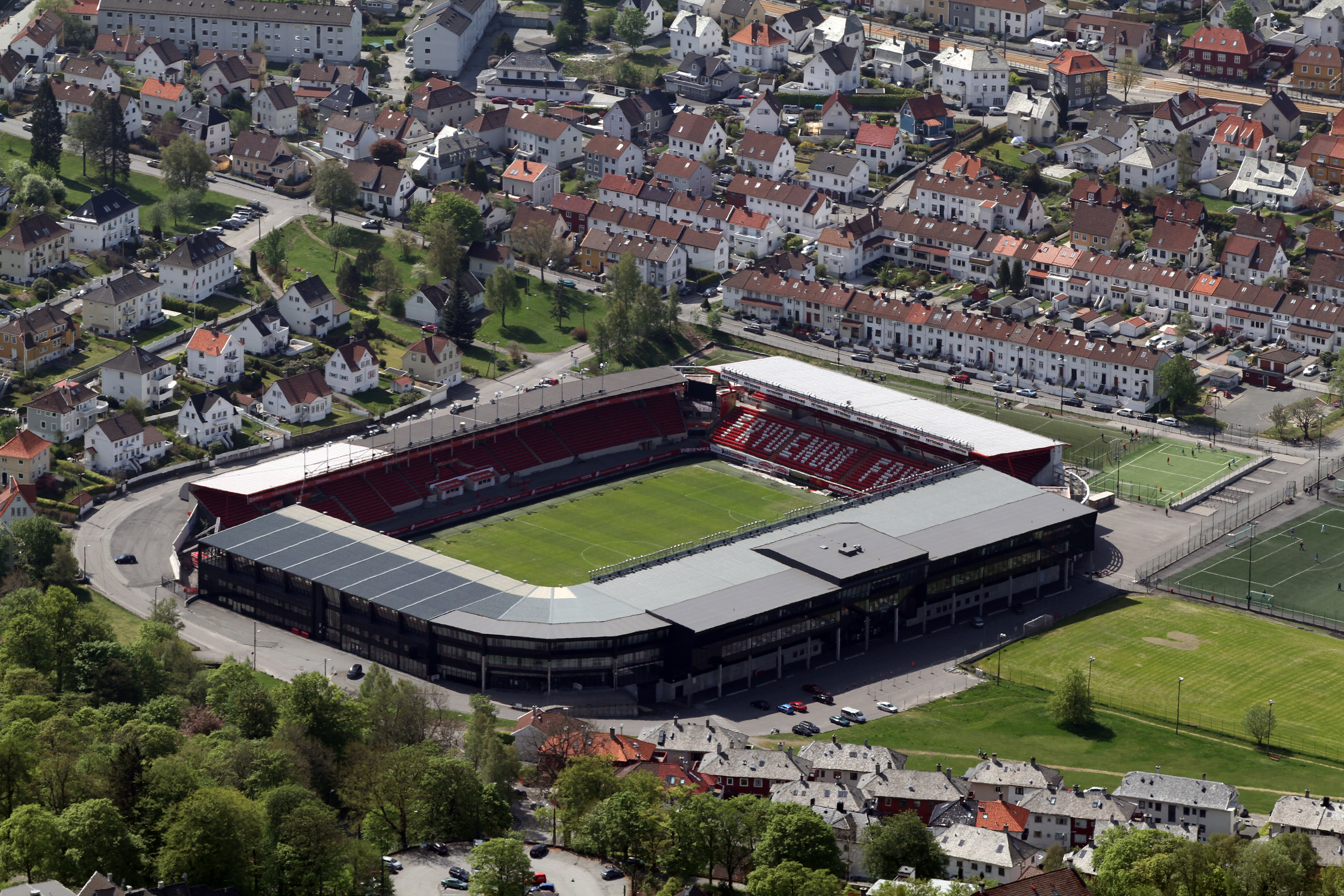
Scotland played their first match outside the British Isles on 26 May 1929, when they played Norway at the Brann Stadion (pictured) in Bergen.

The Scotland national football team represents Scotland in international association football and is controlled by the Scottish Football Association. It is the joint-oldest national football team in the world, alongside England, Scotland's opponents in what is now recognised as the world's first international football match, which took place at Hamilton Crescent in Glasgow in November 1872.

Between the resumption of international football after the First World War in 1920 and the start of the Second World War in 1939, Scotland played 75 international matches, resulting in 46 victories, 12 draws and 17 defeats. Each year Scotland played in the British Home Championship, a round-robin tournament also involving England, Wales and Ireland. Of the 20 tournaments played during this period, Scotland won 7 outright and 4 jointly. One of Scotland's most famous victories came in 1928, when the Wembley Wizards defeated their rivals England 5–1. The team drew large crowds, with the home matches against England in 1931, 1933 and 1937 all setting world record attendances. The match in April 1937 recorded an official attendance of 149,415, which still stands as the record attendance for a European international match.

Scotland started to play matches against opposition from beyond the British Isles between the wars, playing ad-hoc friendly matches against Austria, Czechoslovakia, France, Germany, Hungary, Italy, the Netherlands, Norway and Switzerland. The first FIFA World Cup was played in 1930, but none of the Home Nations, including Scotland, participated in the tournament before the Second World War. This was because their associations had been excluded from FIFA due to a disagreement regarding the status of amateur players. The four associations, including Scotland, returned to the FIFA fold after the Second World War.

== Key ==
Key to matches

- Att. = Match attendance
- (H) = Home ground
- (A) = Away ground

Key to record by opponent

- P = Games played
- W = Games won
- D = Games drawn
- L = Games lost
- GF = Goals for
- GA = Goals against

== Results ==
Scotland's score is shown first in each case.

Match number	Date	Venue	Opponent	Result	Competition	Scotland scorers	Att.	Ref.
114	26 February 1920	Ninian Park, Cardiff (A)	Wales	1–1	British Home Championship	Tommy Cairns	16,000	
115	13 March 1920	Celtic Park, Glasgow (H)	Ireland	3–0	British Home Championship	Andrew Wilson, Alan Morton, Andy Cunningham	39,757	
116	10 April 1920	Hillsborough Stadium, Sheffield (A)	England	4–5	British Home Championship	Tom Miller (2), Alex Donaldson, Andrew Wilson	35,000	
117	12 February 1921	Pittodrie Park, Aberdeen (H)	Wales	2–1	British Home Championship	Andrew Wilson (2)	20,824	
118	26 February 1921	Windsor Park, Belfast (A)	Ireland	2–0	British Home Championship	Andrew Wilson, Joe Cassidy	40,000	
119	9 April 1921	Hampden Park, Glasgow (H)	England	3–0	British Home Championship	Andrew Wilson, Alan Morton, Andy Cunningham	100,000	
120	4 February 1922	Racecourse Ground, Wrexham (A)	Wales	1–2	British Home Championship	Sandy Archibald	10,000	
121	4 March 1922	Celtic Park, Glasgow (H)	Ireland	2–1	British Home Championship	Andrew Wilson (2)	40,000	
122	8 April 1922	Villa Park, Birmingham (A)	England	1–0	British Home Championship	Andrew Wilson	33,646	
123	3 March 1923	Windsor Park, Belfast (A)	Ireland	1–0	British Home Championship	Andrew Wilson	30,000	
124	17 March 1923	Love Street, Paisley (H)	Wales	2–0	British Home Championship	Andrew Wilson (2)	25,000	
125	14 April 1923	Hampden Park, Glasgow (H)	England	2–2	British Home Championship	Andy Cunningham, Andrew Wilson	71,000	
126	16 February 1924	Ninian Park, Cardiff (A)	Wales	0–2	British Home Championship		26,000	
127	1 March 1924	Windsor Park, Belfast (A)	Ireland	2–0	British Home Championship	Andy Cunningham, David Morris	30,000	
128	12 April 1924	Wembley Stadium, London (A)	England	1–1	British Home Championship	Own goal	37,250	
129	14 February 1925	Tynecastle Park, Edinburgh (H)	Wales	3–1	British Home Championship	David Meiklejohn, Hughie Gallacher (2)	25,000	
130	28 February 1925	Windsor Park, Belfast (A)	Ireland	3–0	British Home Championship	David Meiklejohn, Hughie Gallacher, Jimmy Dunn	41,000	
131	4 April 1925	Hampden Park, Glasgow (H)	England	2–0	British Home Championship	Hughie Gallacher (2)	92,000	
132	31 October 1925	Ninian Park, Cardiff (A)	Wales	3–0	British Home Championship	Johnny Duncan, Adam McLean, William Clunas	25,000	
133	27 February 1926	Ibrox Park, Glasgow (H)	Ireland	4–0	British Home Championship	Hughie Gallacher (3), Andy Cunningham	30,000	
134	17 April 1926	Old Trafford, Manchester (A)	England	1–0	British Home Championship	Alex Jackson	49,000	
135	30 October 1926	Ibrox Park, Glasgow (H)	Wales	3–0	British Home Championship	Hughie Gallacher, Alex Jackson (2)	40,500	
136	26 February 1927	Windsor Park, Belfast (A)	Ireland	2–0	British Home Championship	Alan Morton (2)	40,000	
137	2 April 1927	Hampden Park, Glasgow (H)	England	1–2	British Home Championship	Alan Morton	111,214	
138	29 October 1927	Racecourse Ground, Wrexham (A)	Wales	2–2	British Home Championship	Hughie Gallacher, Jock Hutton	16,000	
139	25 February 1928	Firhill Park, Glasgow (H)	Ireland	0–1	British Home Championship		55,000	
140	31 March 1928	Wembley Stadium, London (A)	England	5–1	British Home Championship	Alex Jackson (2), Alex James (3)	80,868	
141	27 October 1928	Ibrox Park, Glasgow (H)	Wales	4–2	British Home Championship	Hughie Gallacher (3), Jimmy Dunn	55,000	
142	23 February 1929	Windsor Park, Belfast (A)	Ireland	7–3	British Home Championship	Hughie Gallacher (4), Alex Jackson (2), Alex James	35,000	
143	13 April 1929	Hampden Park, Glasgow (H)	England	1–0	British Home Championship	Alec Cheyne	110,512	
144	26 May 1929	Brann Stadion, Bergen (A)	Norway	7–3	Friendly	Bobby Rankin, Tully Craig, Alec Cheyne (3), Jimmy Nisbet (2)	4,000	
145	1 June 1929	Grunewaldstadion, Berlin (A)	Germany	1–1	Friendly	Willie Imrie	40,000	
146	4 June 1929	Olympisch Stadion, Amsterdam (A)	Netherlands	2–0	Friendly	Jimmy Fleming, Bobby Rankin	24,000	
147	26 October 1929	Ninian Park, Cardiff (A)	Wales	4–2	British Home Championship	Hughie Gallacher (2), Alex James, Jimmy Gibson	25,000	
148	22 February 1930	Celtic Park, Glasgow (H)	Ireland	3–1	British Home Championship	Hughie Gallacher (2), George Stevenson	30,000	
149	5 April 1930	Wembley Stadium, London (A)	England	2–5	British Home Championship	Jimmy Fleming (2)	87,375	
150	18 May 1930	Stade Olympique Yves-du-Manoir, Colombes (A)	France	2–0	Friendly	Hughie Gallacher (2)	25,000	
151	25 October 1930	Ibrox Park, Glasgow (H)	Wales	1–1	British Home Championship	Barney Battles, Jr.	15,000	
152	21 February 1931	Windsor Park, Belfast (A)	Ireland	0–0	British Home Championship		27,000	
153	28 March 1931	Hampden Park, Glasgow (H)	England	2–0	British Home Championship	George Stevenson, Jimmy McGrory	129,810	
154	16 May 1931	Hohe Warte Stadium, Vienna (A)	Austria	0–5	Friendly		40,000	
155	20 May 1931	Stadio Nazionale PNF, Rome (A)	Italy	0–3	Friendly		25,000	
156	24 May 1931	Stade de Charmilles, Geneva (A)	Switzerland	3–2	Friendly	Jimmy Easson, Billy Boyd, Andy Love	20,000	
157	19 September 1931	Ibrox Park, Glasgow (H)	Ireland	3–1	British Home Championship	George Stevenson, Jimmy McGrory, Bob McPhail	40,000	
158	31 October 1931	Racecourse Ground, Wrexham (A)	Wales	3–2	British Home Championship	George Stevenson, Bertie Thomson, Jimmy McGrory	10,860	
159	9 April 1932	Wembley Stadium, London (A)	England	0–3	British Home Championship		92,180	
160	8 May 1932	Stade Olympique Yves-du-Manoir, Colombes (A)	France	3–1	Friendly	Neil Dewar (3)	8,000	
161	17 September 1932	Windsor Park, Belfast (A)	Ireland	4–0	British Home Championship	James King, Bob McPhail (2), Jimmy McGrory	40,000	
162	26 October 1932	Tynecastle Park, Edinburgh (H)	Wales	2–5	British Home Championship	Neil Dewar, Dally Duncan	31,000	
163	1 April 1933	Hampden Park, Glasgow (H)	England	2–1	British Home Championship	Jimmy McGrory (2)	134,170	
164	16 September 1933	Celtic Park, Glasgow (H)	Ireland	1–2	British Home Championship	Bob McPhail	27,135	
165	4 October 1933	Ninian Park, Cardiff (A)	Wales	2–3	British Home Championship	Willie MacFadyen, Dally Duncan	40,000	
166	29 November 1933	Hampden Park, Glasgow (H)	Austria	2–2	Friendly	David Meiklejohn, Willie MacFadyen	62,000	
167	14 April 1934	Wembley Stadium, London (A)	England	0–3	British Home Championship		92,363	
168	20 October 1934	Windsor Park, Belfast (A)	Ireland	1–2	British Home Championship	Patrick Gallacher	39,752	
169	21 November 1934	Pittodrie Park, Aberdeen (H)	Wales	3–2	British Home Championship	Dally Duncan, Charlie Napier (2)	26,334	
170	6 April 1935	Hampden Park, Glasgow (H)	England	2–0	British Home Championship	Dally Duncan (2)	129,693	
171	5 October 1935	Ninian Park, Cardiff (A)	Wales	1–1	British Home Championship	Dally Duncan	35,004	
172	13 November 1935	Tynecastle Park, Edinburgh (H)	Ireland	2–1	British Home Championship	Tommy Walker, Dally Duncan	30,000	
173	4 April 1936	Wembley Stadium, London (A)	England	1–1	British Home Championship	Tommy Walker	93,267	
174	14 October 1936	Ibrox Park, Glasgow (H)	Germany	2–0	Friendly	Jimmy Delaney (2)	50,000	
175	31 October 1936	Windsor Park, Belfast (A)	Ireland	3–1	British Home Championship	Charlie Napier, Alex Munro, David McCulloch	45,000	
176	2 December 1936	Dens Park, Dundee (H)	Wales	1–2	British Home Championship	Tommy Walker	23,858	
177	17 April 1937	Hampden Park, Glasgow (H)	England	3–1	British Home Championship	Frank O'Donnell, Bob McPhail (2)	149,415	
178	9 May 1937	Praterstadion, Vienna (A)	Austria	1–1	Friendly	Frank O'Donnell	63,000	
179	15 May 1937	Stadion Sparta-Letna, Prague (A)	Czechoslovakia	3–1	Friendly	Jimmy Simpson, Bob McPhail, Torrance Gillick	35,000	
180	30 October 1937	Ninian Park, Cardiff (A)	Wales	1–2	British Home Championship	Alex Massie	41,800	
181	10 November 1937	Pittodrie Park, Aberdeen (H)	Ireland	1–1	British Home Championship	Jimmy Smith	21,878	
182	8 December 1937	Ibrox Park, Glasgow (H)	Czechoslovakia	5–0	Friendly	Andy Black, David McCulloch (2), Peter Buchanan, David Kinnear	41,000	
183	9 April 1938	Wembley Stadium, London (A)	England	1–0	British Home Championship	Tommy Walker	93,267	
184	21 May 1938	Olympisch Stadion, Amsterdam (A)	Netherlands	3–1	Friendly	Andy Black, Frank Murphy, Tommy Walker	50,000	
185	8 October 1938	Windsor Park, Belfast (A)	Ireland	2–0	British Home Championship	Jimmy Delaney, Tommy Walker	40,000	
186	9 November 1938	Tynecastle Park, Edinburgh (H)	Wales	3–2	British Home Championship	Torrance Gillick, Tommy Walker (2)	34,800	
187	7 December 1938	Ibrox Park, Glasgow (H)	Hungary	3–1	Friendly	Tommy Walker, Andy Black, Torrance Gillick	23,000	
188	15 April 1939	Hampden Park, Glasgow (H)	England	1–2	British Home Championship	Jimmy Dougal	149,269	

== Record by opponent ==
Team	Pld	W	D	L	GF	GA	GD	WPCT
Austria	3	0	2	1	3	8	−5	0.00
Czechoslovakia	2	2	0	0	8	1	+7	100.00
England	20	11	3	6	35	27	+8	55.00
France	2	2	0	0	5	1	+4	100.00
Germany	2	1	1	0	3	1	+2	50.00
Hungary	1	1	0	0	3	1	+2	100.00
Ireland	20	15	2	3	46	14	+32	75.00
Italy	1	0	0	1	0	3	−3	0.00
Netherlands	2	2	0	0	5	1	+4	100.00
Norway	1	1	0	0	7	3	+4	100.00
Switzerland	1	1	0	0	3	2	+1	100.00
Wales	20	10	4	6	42	33	+9	50.00
Total	75	46	12	17	160	95	+65	61.33

Source: Results

== British Home Championship record ==
Record by season
Year	Placing
1919–20	2nd (joint)
1920–21	1st
1921–22	1st
1922–23	1st
1923–24	2nd
1924–25	1st
1925–26	1st
1926–27	1st (joint)
1927–28	3rd
1928–29	1st
1929–30	2nd
1930–31	1st (joint)
1931–32	2nd
1932–33	2nd
1933–34	4th
1934–35	1st (joint)
1935–36	1st
1936–37	2nd
1937–38	2nd (joint)
1938–39	1st (joint)

Overall record
Place	Times	Times joint
1st	7	4
2nd	5	2
3rd	1	0
4th	1	—
