= Bert Gray =

Welsh footballer

Personal information
- Full name: Albert Gray
- Date of birth: 23 September 1900
- Place of birth: Tredegar, Wales
- Date of death: 16 December 1969 (aged 69)
- Place of death: Blackpool, England
- Position: Goalkeeper

Youth career
- Rhyd Welfare
- Rhyd Athletic

Senior career*
Years	Team	Apps	(Gls)
1921–1923	Ebbw Vale		
1923–1927	Oldham Athletic	97	(0)
1927–1930	Manchester City	68	(0)
1929–1930	→ Manchester Central (loan)		
1930–1931	Coventry City		
1931–1936	Tranmere Rovers	192	(0)
1936–1938	Chester	73	(0)
1938	Waterford		
1938–1939	Congleton Town	39	(0)

International career
1924–1938	Wales	24	(0)
- * Club domestic league appearances and goals

Albert Gray (23 September 1900 – 16 December 1969) was a Welsh professional footballer who played as goalkeeper for various clubs in the 1920s and 30s, including Oldham Athletic, Manchester City, Tranmere Rovers and Chester. For his country, he made 24 appearances between 1924 and 1938, helping Wales win the British Home Championship three times.

== Football career ==
=== Club career ===
Gray was born in Tredegar, Monmouthshire and first came to the attention of scouts from the Football League when he stood in for the injured goalkeeper for a local colliery side. He spent two years with Ebbw Vale during which time the club won the Southern League Welsh Section in 1921–22, going one better the following year to win the Southern League championship.

Standing at 6 ft 3ins, Gray was one of the tallest players at the time and used his height to great effect; he was described as "a very capable goalkeeper, (who) was cool and safe and inspired confidence in his defenders".

In May 1923, he moved to the Football League Second Division with Oldham Athletic where he remained for four seasons, making over 100 first-team appearances before joining fellow Second Division club, Manchester City for a fee of £2,250 in January 1927, where he displaced long-term custodians Jim Goodchild and James Mitchell. He soon became a regular for his new club, helping them to win the Second Division title in 1927–28.

By the end of the first season in the First Division, Gray was out of favour at Maine Road and in August 1929 he was loaned for a season to the short-lived Manchester Central club. There then followed a year with Coventry City where he never played a first-team game, before joining Tranmere Rovers. Gray spent five seasons at the Prenton Park club, during which they twice reached the final of the Welsh Cup, losing to Bristol City in 1934, but winning the trophy the following year with a 1–0 victory over Chester.

In 1936, he applied for the manager's job at Tranmere but was turned down and moved to fellow Third Division North club, Chester. After a brief spell in Ireland at Waterford in 1938, Gray wound up his career in the Cheshire League with Congleton Town.

== International career ==
Gray made his international debut for Wales in the 1924 British Home Championship match against Scotland on 16 February 1924. The game at Ninian Park, Cardiff ended in a 2–0 victory for Wales, with goals from Willie Davies and Len Davies. Gray retained his place for the next two matches with victories over England and Ireland, thus enabling Wales to take the British Home Championship trophy for the second time in five years. Gray only missed four Wales international matches between February 1924 and October 1929 during which time Wales again claimed the Championship trophy under captain Fred Keenor.

On 28 November 1927, Gray featured in an eventful match against England at Burnley's Turf Moor ground, involving two own goals and a missed penalty. Wales opened the scoring with a goal from Wilf Lewis followed by an own goal by England's captain, Jack Hill, playing at his home stadium. In the second half, Roy Goodall had the chance to bring England back into the game but missed his penalty. When England finally scored, this was also an own goal as Fred Keenor deflected Louis Page's corner past Gray in the Wales goal. (Some sources claim that it was Gray himself who turned the ball into the net.)

In the summer of 1929, the Football Association of Wales sent a party of players to tour Canada, with Gray and Len Evans sharing the goalkeeping duties. In an article welcoming the touring party, The Montreal Gazette described Gray as "well equipped for the position as he stands 6 feet 3 inches and should have little difficulty reaching high shots." Gray was "in the glory of his manhood at 29 years of age. His goalkeeping has been described as "majestic" and there is no exaggeration in this word". During the tour, Wales played 15 matches in five weeks, winning them all with 61 goals scored and only ten conceded.

During the two years between November 1929 and October 1931, Wales called upon several keepers, including Cardiff City's Len Evans and Wrexham's Dick Finnigan, who was called up for the match against Ireland in February 1930 because Manchester City refused to release Gray. (The Irish won this match 7–0, with six goals from Joe Bambrick.)

Gray returned to the side for three matches in October/November 1931, in the 1932 British Home Championship. Gray was appointed captain in Keenor's absence for the match against Scotland on 31 October; despite "(keeping) goal in fine style", Gray conceded three goals with the Welsh only managing two in reply from Ernie Curtis.

For five seasons, between October 1932 and March 1936, Roy John played in goal for Wales, before Gray received a recall for the match against England on 17 October 1936. The 2-1 victory for Wales meant Bert Gray became the first Welshman to be on the winning side against England four times. Gray retained his place for five matches and helped Wales take the British Home Championship once again. His final international appearance came against Ireland on 16 March 1938 when Gray was in his 38th year. He remained Wales's most capped goalkeeper for twenty years until Jack Kelsey won his 25th cap against Brazil in the 1958 World Cup quarter finals.

=== International appearances ===
Gray made 24 appearances for Wales in official international matches, as follows:

Date	Venue	Opponent	Result	Goals	Competition
16 February 1924	Ninian Park, Cardiff	Scotland	2–0	0	1924 British Home Championship
3 March 1924	Ewood Park, Blackburn	England	2–1	0	1924 British Home Championship
15 March 1924	Windsor Park, Belfast	Ireland	1–0	0	1924 British Home Championship
14 February 1925	Tynecastle Park, Edinburgh	Scotland	1–3	0	1925 British Home Championship
28 February 1925	Vetch Field, Swansea	England	1–2	0	1925 British Home Championship
18 April 1925	Racecourse Ground, Wrexham	Ireland	0–0	0	1925 British Home Championship
31 October 1925	Ninian Park, Cardiff	Scotland	0–3	0	1926 British Home Championship
1 March 1926	Selhurst Park, London	England	3–1	0	1926 British Home Championship
30 October 1926	Ibrox Park, Glasgow	Scotland	0–3	0	1927 British Home Championship
29 October 1927	Racecourse Ground, Wrexham	Scotland	2–2	0	1928 British Home Championship
28 November 1927	Turf Moor, Burnley	England	2–1	0	1928 British Home Championship
27 October 1928	Ibrox Park, Glasgow	Scotland	2–4	0	1929 British Home Championship
17 November 1928	Vetch Field, Swansea	England	2–3	0	1929 British Home Championship
2 February 1929	Racecourse Ground, Wrexham	Ireland	2–2	0	1929 British Home Championship
26 October 1929	Ninian Park, Cardiff	Scotland	2–4	0	1930 British Home Championship
31 October 1931	Racecourse Ground, Wrexham	Scotland	2–3	0 (Captain)	1932 British Home Championship
18 November 1931	Anfield, Liverpool	England	1–3	0	1932 British Home Championship
5 December 1931	Windsor Park, Belfast	Ireland	0–4	0	1932 British Home Championship
17 October 1936	Ninian Park, Cardiff	England	2–1	0	1937 British Home Championship
2 December 1936	Dens Park, Dundee	Scotland	2–1	0	1937 British Home Championship
17 March 1937	Racecourse Ground, Wrexham	Ireland	4–1	0	1937 British Home Championship
30 October 1937	Ninian Park, Cardiff	Scotland	2–1	0	1938 British Home Championship
17 November 1937	Ayresome Park, Middlesbrough	England	1–2	0	1938 British Home Championship
16 March 1938	Windsor Park, Belfast	Ireland	0–1	0	1938 British Home Championship

Win	Draw	Loss

== Later career ==
Gray was a keen golfer and won the Merseyside Footballers' title in 1933, 1934 and 1936.

During the Second World War, he was a sergeant-instructor with South-Eastern Command. In October 1942, he was goalkeeper for a South-Eastern Command team composed of professional footballers, including England internationals Bert Sproston, Cliff Britton and Albert Geldard, who played a 0–0 draw at Erith. After the war, Gray became a bookmaker at Cleveleys, near Blackpool. He died in Blackpool on 16 December 1969.

In April 2009, Gray's archives and collection of memorabilia were put up for auction; his caps, medals and photographs raised in excess of £4,000. Several of the items were acquired by the Welsh National Football Collection, including his League medal from 1923, a Wales Football Team Badge, two medals from the Canadian tour of 1929, one of Gray's international caps and Gray's shirt from his final international appearance.

== Honours ==
Ebbw Vale

- Southern League Welsh Section winners: 1921–22, 1922–23
- Southern League champions: 1922–23

Manchester City

- Football League Second Division champions: 1927–28

Tranmere Rovers

- Welsh Cup winners: 1935
- Welsh Cup finalists: 1934

Wales

- British Home Championship winners: 1923–24, 1927–28, 1936–37
