= Moses Russell =

Welsh footballer (1888–1946)

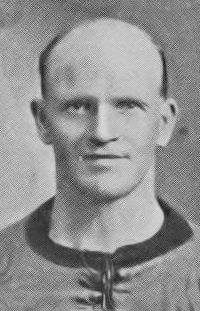

Personal information
- Full name: Moses Richard Russell
- Date of birth: 20 May 1888
- Place of birth: Tredegar, Wales
- Date of death: 18 December 1946 (aged 58)
- Place of death: Chepstow, Wales
- Position: Full back

Senior career*
Years	Team	Apps	(Gls)
1911	Ton Pentre		
1911–1912	Merthyr Town		
1912–1913	Southport		
1913–1914	Merthyr Town		
1914–1930	Plymouth Argyle	375	(5)
1930–1931	Thames	13	(0)
1931	Llanelli		

International career
1912–1928	Wales	23	(1)
- * Club domestic league appearances and goals

Moses Richard Russell (20 May 1888 – 18 December 1946) was a Welsh international footballer, who played most of his career with Plymouth Argyle. A full back, he attained 23 caps for the Wales national football team.

== Early career ==
Russell was born in Tredegar, in Monmouthshire and after leaving school he began work as a coal-miner. In his leisure time he played both association football and rugby as well as being a boxer and competent swimmer, once rescuing a drowning child from a river. His first professional club was Ton Pentre, whom he joined in 1911 before transferring to Merthyr Town later that year. Whilst with Merthyr Town, Russell helped them win the South Wales & Monmouthshire FA Cup.

He made his debut for Wales playing at left half against Scotland on 2 March 1912. Although he was not selected for the next international, against England, he was called up to play Ireland on 13 April, this time in his preferred position at left back. Both matches ended in defeats, with Wales taking the "wooden spoon" in the 1912 British Home Championship.

In the summer of 1912, Russell left South Wales to join Southport but with the club having financial problems, he returned to Merthyr on a free transfer in February 1913, rather than take a cut in his wages. Whilst with Merthyr, he gained his third "cap", against England on 16 March 1914.

As a result of a bout of rheumatic fever, Russell lost most of his hair; his bald head made him appear some years older than his true age. As a result, several clubs rejected him as a "veteran". It is quite possible that the rheumatic fever caused Russell to visit the spa town of Builth Wells to aid his recovery as he subsequently wrote the following to the proprietor of the Park Wells Spa dated 24 May 1927. " ...I must write to let you know the wonderful benefit I have received through taking the Builth Wells saline and sulphur waters. I was crippled with peritonitis (sic) of the knee and thought I would have to give up my career as a professional footballer, but since taking your wonderful waters I have not only played in every match last season, but am still fit and have had no recurrence of the trouble. yours faithfully, Moses Russell, 34 Bickham Park, Peverall, Plymouth." The above is quoted from A Pictorial History of Builth Wells.

=== Plymouth Argyle ===
In the summer of 1914, Russell signed for Plymouth Argyle for a club record fee of £400. He made his debut for Argyle on 2 September 1914 in a 2–0 victory over Brighton & Hove Albion. Despite the outbreak of the First World War, the Southern League season continued, although international football was suspended. During his first season at Home Park, Russell soon became the established choice at left back, making 25 league appearances. Following the completion of the 1914–15 season, normal league football was suspended until 1919.

During the war, Russell served as a private in the mechanised transport section of the Army Service Corps, receiving the British War Medal and Victory Medal.

On the cessation of hostilities, league football resumed at the start of the 1919–20 season, with Argyle spending one further season in the Southern League before transferring to the newly formed Football League Third Division in 1920.

Described as a player with "unquenchable enthusiasm and gritty determination", Russell was "an inspiration throughout the 1920s at (both) club and country level". A "big, strong defender, he was quick, had good positional sense and was of inestimable value to Plymouth Argyle". In 1922, Russell joined the Players' Union, along with Howard Matthews, Charlie Buchan and George Utley.

Russell became club captain and led his side to the runners-up position in the Football League Division Three South for six successive seasons between 1921–22 and 1926–27. With only the champions being promoted to the Second Division, Argyle continued to miss out on promotion until 1930, by when Russell was coming to the end of his career. As a result of the failure to reach the top place in the table, Russell was dubbed "the unluckiest captain in soccer".

In the summer of 1924, a Plymouth Argyle team visited South America to play some exhibition football in Uruguay and the Argentine. Russell captained the side and played in all nine matches. Russell's style of play caught the attention of the Argentine press; at the end of the tour "The Standard of Buenos Aires" commented:

The visit of Plymouth Argyle will be best remembered by the outstanding personality and genius of Moses Russell. His effective style, precise judgment, accurate and timely clearances, powerful kicking and no less useful work with his head.....one of the most wonderful backs and one of the brainiest players ever seen on the football field.

In the tour match against Boca Juniors on 9 July 1924, the home supporters invaded the pitch after their team had scored the opening goal and carried all eleven home players shoulder high around the stadium. After a half-hour delay, the referee restarted the match, but a further invasion was sparked when the referee awarded a penalty against the home side. When the match was again restarted, the Argyle players had agreed that Patsy Corcoran would take the spot-kick and miss. The ultra-competitive Russell was not prepared to accept this and pushed Corcoran aside and took the penalty himself. This prompted a further pitch invasion by the Boca fans and this time the match was abandoned.

Following the signature of former England international Fred Titmuss from Southampton in 1926, Russell switched from left back to right back. By the 1929–30 season, Russell (now aged 41) had lost his regular place in the Argyle side to Harry Bland and made only seven appearances in the side that won the Division Three South title. In the summer of 1930 he was transferred to Thames A.F.C. who had just been elected to the Third Division South, at the expense of Russell's former club, Merthyr Town.

== International career ==
Having made the first three of his international appearances before the First World War whilst with Merthyr Town, Russell became a permanent fixture in the Wales team during the early 1920s, missing only one international match between 1920 and 1925.

In the 1920 British Home Championship, Wales drew with Scotland and Ireland, but a 2–1 victory over England at Highbury on 15 March 1920 gave them only their second British Home Championship title.

Scotland took the championship in each of the next three years, but in 1924, Wales claimed the "Triple Crown". After victories over Scotland and England, Wales met Ireland at Windsor Park, Belfast on 15 March with the Irish needing a victory to claim a share of the title. In a hard-fought match, Russell converted the penalty which gave Wales the victory by a 1–0 margin.

Russell continued to turn out for Wales over the next few years, helping them to claim a fourth championship in 1927–28 before making his final appearance, aged 40, on 17 November 1928 in a 2–3 defeat by England. His 20 international appearances during his Plymouth Argyle career, made him Argyle's most-capped player, a record he held until Tony Capaldi made his 21st appearance for Northern Ireland (against Wales) on 6 February 2007.

Although Russell made no further full international appearances, he accompanied a Welsh party that toured Canada in 1929. In a match at Hamilton, Ontario, play was getting a "little rough" when Russell fouled one of the Hamilton players, George Chambers. This precipitated a pitch invasion by the Hamilton supporters who surrounded Russell, who ended up leaving the pitch on a stretcher. Some reports claim that during the altercation, one of the spectators threatened Russell with a pistol.

== Later career ==
After one season at Thames, in which he made 13 appearances, Russell returned to Wales to spend a brief period at Llanelli before retiring.

During the Second World War, Russell joined the Territorial Army; after the war, he worked at the Royal Propellant Factory at Chepstow, where he died in December 1946.

== International appearances ==
Russell made 23 appearances for Wales in international matches, as follows:

Date	Venue	Opponent	Result	Goals	Competition
2 March 1912	Tynecastle Park, Edinburgh	Scotland	0–1	0	British Home Championship
13 April 1912	Ninian Park, Cardiff	Ireland	2–3	0	British Home Championship
16 March 1914	Ninian Park, Cardiff	England	0–2	0	British Home Championship
14 February 1920	The Oval, Belfast	Ireland	2–2	0	British Home Championship
26 February 1920	Ninian Park, Cardiff	Scotland	2–2	0	British Home Championship
15 March 1920	Highbury, London	England	2–1	0	British Home Championship (Winners)
12 February 1921	Pittodrie, Aberdeen	Scotland	1–2	0	British Home Championship
14 March 1921	Ninian Park, Cardiff	England	0–0	0	British Home Championship
9 April 1921	Vetch Field, Swansea	Ireland	2–1	0	British Home Championship
13 March 1922	Anfield, Liverpool	England	0–1	0	British Home Championship
1 April 1922	Windsor Park, Belfast	Ireland	1–1	0	British Home Championship
5 March 1923	Ninian Park, Cardiff	England	2–2	0	British Home Championship
17 March 1923	Love Street, Paisley	Scotland	0–2	0	British Home Championship
14 April 1923	Racecourse Ground, Wrexham	Ireland	3–1	0	British Home Championship
16 February 1924	Ninian Park, Cardiff	Scotland	2–0	0	British Home Championship
3 March 1924	Ewood Park, Blackburn	England	2–1	0	British Home Championship
15 March 1924	Windsor Park, Belfast	Ireland	1–0	1 (Pen)	British Home Championship (Winners)
14 February 1925	Tynecastle, Edinburgh	Scotland	1–3	0	British Home Championship
28 February 1925	Vetch Field, Swansea	England	1–2	0	British Home Championship
18 April 1925	Racecourse Ground, Wrexham	Ireland	0–0	0	British Home Championship
1 March 1926	Selhurst Park, London	England	3–1	0	British Home Championship
29 October 1927	Racecourse Ground, Wrexham	Scotland	2–2	0	British Home Championship (Winners)
17 November 1928	Vetch Field, Swansea	England	2–3	0	British Home Championship

== Honours ==
Merthyr Town

- South Wales & Monmouthshire FA Cup: 1912

Wales

- British Home Championship: 1920, 1924, 1928

Individual

- Merthyr Town Hall of Fame
