= Jack Hill (footballer, born 1897) =

English footballer and manager

Personal information
- Full name: John Henry Hill
- Date of birth: 2 March 1897
- Place of birth: Hetton-le-Hole, England
- Date of death: April 1972 (aged 75)
- Place of death: Helensburgh, Scotland
- Height: 6 ft 3 in (1.91 m)
- Position: Centre half

Youth career
- Hetton Juniors

Senior career*
Years	Team	Apps	(Gls)
1919–1920	Durham City		
1920–1923	Plymouth Argyle	101	(10)
1923–1928	Burnley	184	(13)
1928–1931	Newcastle United	74	(2)
1931	Bradford City	8	(1)
1931–1934	Hull City	94	(2)
Total		461	(28)

International career
- Southern League XI
	Football League XI	3	(0)
1925–1929	England	11	(0)

Managerial career
- 1934–1936: Hull City
- * Club domestic league appearances and goals

John Henry Hill (2 March 1897 – April 1972) was an English footballer who played for various teams including Burnley and Newcastle United between 1920 and 1934. He made 11 appearances for England, eight as captain. He subsequently played for, and then managed, Hull City.

== Playing career ==
=== Early career ===
Hill was born at Hetton-le-Hole, County Durham and, after playing junior football in and around Durham whilst working as a coal-miner and seeing action at Gallipoli and Salonika with the East Yorkshire Regiment during the First World War, he joined Durham City in 1919.

=== Plymouth Argyle ===
After a brief period, he moved in September 1920 to Devon to join Plymouth Argyle, who had recently been admitted to the Football League Third Division. He remained for three seasons at Home Park, in the last two of which Argyle finished as runners-up in the (now) Third Division South missing out on the single promotion place available firstly to Southampton on goal difference and then to Bristol City.

=== Burnley ===
In May 1923, he was sold to First Division Burnley for a fee of £5,450. After representing the Football League on three occasions, he received his first England call up for a British Home Championship match in Wales on 28 February 1925. In this match he played at right-half, with Charlie Spencer in the centre. England ran out 2–1 victors, with goals from Frank Roberts.

His next England call-up came against Scotland in April 1926, when he took over the No. 5 shirt, which he was to retain for the remainder of his England career. The following year, he took over the captain's armband for the match at Hampden Park, Glasgow, which England won 2–1, both goals coming from Dixie Dean.

In May 1927, England went on a three-match tour of Europe. In the first match, against Belgium, England ran up 9 goals including a hat trick from Dixie Dean and a pair each from George Brown and Arthur Rigby. Hill sat out the next match (against Luxembourg) but returned for the match at the Colombes Stadium in Paris. England again won convincingly, defeating France by six goals (including two each from Dean and Brown).

Hill retained his place for the opening match of the 1928 British Home Championship against Ireland at Windsor Park, Belfast on 22 October 1927. Despite going into the game with high expectations, England had a torrid time. After twenty minutes goalkeeper Ted Hufton broke his arm when diving at the feet of Jackie Mahood. Hufton played on but was unable to prevent an own goal after 36 minutes, when Herbert Jones deflected Bobby Irvine's shot past him. Hufton was eventually taken off after 40 minutes and rushed to hospital, to be replaced in goal by Bury's John Ball on his solitary England appearance. The position soon worsened as Hill had to retire at half time due to a "nasty" leg injury. England played the rest of the match with 9 men, and went down 2–0.

Hill recovered in time for the next England match, against Wales five weeks later to be played at Burnley's Turf Moor ground. The situation for England did not improve, however. Dan Tremelling replaced Hufton in goal for his solitary England appearance, whilst defenders Alf Baker (Arsenal) and Reg Osborne (Leicester City) were given their first (and only) chances at international level. England were soon behind to a goal from Wilf Lewis, and after 40 minutes Hill deflected a cross into his own net. In the second half, Roy Goodall had the chance to bring England back into the game but missed his penalty. When England finally scored, this was an own goal as Fred Keenor deflected Louis Page's corner past Bert Gray in the Welsh goal. (Some sources claim that it was Gray himself who turned the ball into the net.)

Hill was not selected for the final match in the 1928 British Home Championship against Scotland the following March, when England were soundly defeated 5–1, with goals from Alex Jackson (3) and Alex James (2). (For an analysis of this match see Wembley Wizards.) Thus England finished the championship at the foot of the table, with three defeats – this was the first time since the commencement of the British Home Championship that England had failed to take a single point.

=== Newcastle United ===
In October 1928, Hill moved to Newcastle United, who were looking for a replacement for Charlie Spencer. Hill had been recommended to the Newcastle board by Scottish forward Hughie Gallacher, who had come up against Hill several times at both club and international level. As local rivals Sunderland were also keen to sign Hill, Newcastle needed to pay a record transfer fee of £8,100 to secure his services.

Described as being "tall and lanky" (he was 6'3"), Hill soon became Newcastle's captain and "with his willingness to move forward from defence and his quality of distribution", he was also a great favourite with the fans. Unfortunately, after only a couple of seasons at St James' Park, Jack fell into dispute with Newcastle's directors, which led to his premature departure, leaving for Bradford City in June 1931 for a fee of £7,500.

In May 1929, Hill had been recalled to the England team as captain for a tour of Europe when they defeated France 4–1 (two goals each from George Camsell and Edgar Kail) and Belgium 5–1, when Camsell scored another four goals, including a hat-trick in six minutes. For the final match of the tour, England played Spain for the first time ever and in a closely fought match, the Spaniards prevailed by five goals to four. During his England career, Hill had played 11 matches, eight as captain, with a record of six victories, one draw and four defeats.

=== Hull City ===
Hill only stayed at Bradford City until November 1931, before moving to Hull City in a swap deal with Stan Alexander going the other way. In his third season, he helped Hull win the Third Division North title. This was the only title won by Hill during his fifteen-year playing career.

== Managerial and later career ==
After three seasons with Hull as a player, in March 1934 Hill took over the managerial reins from Haydn Green. In his first season in charge, Hull finished comfortably mid-table in the Second Division. Things did not turn out so well in the following season, and in January 1936, Hill was dismissed, to be replaced by David Menzies who was unable to prevent Hull being relegated with only 20 points. As manager, Hill only won 24 out of 77 games, a win rate of 31.16%.

After the Second World War, Hill returned to Hull City where he acted as club scout from 1948 to 1955. He later had a spell at Scarborough, where he was in charge of their pools scheme.

He retired in August 1963 and moved to Scotland where he died in Helensburgh in April 1972.

== Honours ==
Hull City

- Football League Third Division North: 1932–33
