= Jack Jenkins (Welsh footballer) =

Welsh footballer

Personal information
- Full name: John Jenkins
- Date of birth: 20 March 1892
- Place of birth: Gwersyllt, Wales
- Date of death: 16 April 1946 (aged 54)
- Place of death: Brighton, England
- Height: 5 ft 9 in (1.75 m)
- Position: Full back

Senior career*
Years	Team	Apps	(Gls)
1907–1908	Mold Town		
1908–19??	Mardy		
- Wrexham
19??–1914	Gwersyllt		
1914–1919	Pontypridd		
1919–1920	Mardy		
1920–1922	Pontypridd		
1922–1929	Brighton & Hove Albion	216	(4)

International career
1924–1926	Wales	8	(0)
- * Club domestic league appearances and goals

John Jenkins (20 March 1892 – 16 April 1946) was a Welsh international footballer who made 216 Football League appearances playing as a full back for Brighton & Hove Albion.

== Life and career ==
Jenkins was born in Gwersyllt, Denbighshire, and began his football career with Mold Town. Over the next 15 years he played for numerous clubs in Wales, including Mardy and Pontypridd of the Southern League, and made wartime appearances for Portsmouth and Cardiff City, before joining Brighton & Hove Albion of the Football League Third Division South in 1922 at the age of 30. He was a regular in the team for several years, and in his last season, 1927–28, he still played 22 matches. After his retirement as a player, he ran a pub in Brighton, and died in the town in 1946 aged 54.

Jenkins was capped eight times for Wales. He had taken part in a trial match in 1912, but did not win his first cap until 16 February 1924 in a 2–0 defeat of Scotland. Jenkins appeared in all three matches as Wales won the 1923–24 British Home Championship. His eighth and last appearance was also against Scotland, on 30 October 1926, and set a Brighton club record for international caps that lasted until Mark Lawrenson made his ninth appearance for the Republic of Ireland more than 50 years later.

== See also ==
- List of Wales international footballers (alphabetical)
