= Billy Williams (footballer, born 1896) =

Welsh footballer

Personal information
- Date of birth: 1896
- Place of birth: Wales

Senior career*
Years	Team	Apps	(Gls)
1921–1926	Northampton Town	187	(3)

International career
1925	Wales	1	(1)
- * Club domestic league appearances and goals

Billy Williams (born 1896) was a Welsh international footballer. He was part of the Wales national football team, playing 1 match and scoring 1 goal on 14 February 1925 against Scotland during the 1924–25 British Home Championship. In doing so, he became the first, and so far only, Northampton Town player to score an international goal.

== See also ==
- List of Wales international footballers (alphabetical)
