= Harry Bland =

English footballer (1898–1960)

Personal information
- Full name: William Henry Bland
- Date of birth: 12 January 1898
- Place of birth: Leeds, England
- Date of death: 27 July 1960 (aged 62)
- Place of death: Bristol, England
- Position: Defender

Senior career*
Years	Team	Apps	(Gls)
- Royal Navy
1927–1934	Plymouth Argyle	122	(2)
1934–1935	Cardiff City	8	(0)
- * Club domestic league appearances and goals

William Henry Bland (12 January 1898 – 27 July 1960) was an English professional footballer who made 130 appearances in the Football League playing for Plymouth Argyle and Cardiff City. He played as a defender.

Bland was born in Leeds. He served in the Royal Navy and signed for Plymouth Argyle after being posted to the city. He made his debut in the Football League a month short of his 30th birthday and replaced the ageing Moses Russell at right back. He made 128 appearances for the club in all competitions, the last of which came in March 1934. The following season played a few games for Cardiff City, however the side suffered several heavy defeats in a disappointing season, and Bland was one of numerous players released in a bid to improve the club's fortunes. Bland died in Bristol on 27 July 1960, at the age of 62.
