= Len Evans (footballer) =

Welsh footballer (1903–1977)

Personal information
- Full name: Sidney John Vivian Leonard Evans
- Date of birth: 20 May 1903
- Place of birth: Llandaff, Wales
- Date of death: 26 December 1977 (aged 74)
- Place of death: Bournemouth, England
- Position: Goalkeeper

Senior career*
Years	Team	Apps	(Gls)
1922–1926	Cardiff Corinthians		
1926–1927	Aberdare Athletic	24	(0)
1927	Merthyr Town	5	(0)
1927	Cardiff Corinthians		
1928	Lovells Athletic		
1928–1930	Barry		
1930–1933	Cardiff City	8	(0)
1933–1934	Birmingham	2	(0)

International career
1924–1932	Wales Amateur XI	?	(0)
1927–1933	Wales	4	(0)
- * Club domestic league appearances and goals

Sidney John Vivian Leonard Evans (20 May 1903 – 26 December 1977) was a Welsh professional footballer who played in the Football League for Aberdare Athletic, Merthyr Town, Cardiff City and Birmingham, and won four caps for the Wales national football team. He played as a goalkeeper. Before he turned professional he was capped a number of times for the Welsh Amateur XI.

== Personal life ==
Evans was born in Llandaff, now part of Cardiff. As a youngster he sang in a choir and considered becoming a clergyman, but chose instead to join the police, and served in the Barry area before taking up football full-time. He participated in a wide variety of sports apart from football, and later worked as a physical training instructor and athletics coach. He was married to Mary, and died in Bournemouth, Dorset, in 1977 at the age of 74.

== Club career ==
Evans joined the amateur club Cardiff Corinthians in 1922, and within a couple of years had earned his first selection for the Wales Amateur XI. He moved on to Football League club Aberdare Athletic, still as an amateur, in October 1926. He played 24 games in the 1926–27 season, which was Aberdare's last in the Football League, as they finished bottom of the Third Division South and failed to be re-elected. Despite his club's lack of success, Evans himself performed sufficiently well to earn his first cap for the full Wales national team. Evans moved on briefly to Merthyr Town, also of the Third Division South, and had short spells with former club Cardiff Corinthians and with Western League side Lovells Athletic, before settling at Barry of the Southern League in 1928.

Described as "something of a risk-taker, but ... a classy and reliable 'keeper", his only weakness an erratic clearing kick, Evans passed two seasons at Barry. In April 1930 he returned to the Football League with Cardiff City, then playing in the Second Division. He understudied Ireland international Tom Farquharson at Cardiff, and in three years at the club played only eight league games, though this lack of first-team football did not prevent his selection for his country. In September 1933 he joined Birmingham of the First Division, again as deputy to an international goalkeeper, in this case England's Harry Hibbs. After playing only twice for Birmingham's first team in the 1933–34 season, Evans was appointed assistant trainer at the club. He then spent time abroad, returning to England in 1937 to take up the position of trainer at Blackburn Rovers, which he held until the outbreak of the Second World War.

== International career ==
Evans was first selected for the Wales Amateur XI in October 1924; they beat the touring South African team 1–0, though "they had a very anxious time during the first half, when they were mainly indebted to L. Evans, their goalkeeper, for preventing any score." He continued to receive complimentary notices when representing his country. Against England in 1925, "if it had not been for some sound play by Evans, the goalkeeper, the score might have been considerably higher"; in a 4–0 defeat two years later, "the real hero of the Welsh side was L. Evans, the goalkeeper"; and in 1929, again with English opposition, "Evans gave a magnificent performance in goal, stopping shot after shot from the English forwards with amazing confidence". He made his last appearances for the Amateur XI in 1932, in a 5–0 victory against Scotland's amateurs, when, in the opinion of The Times' correspondent, "there was no cooler player on the field than L. Evans, the Welsh goalkeeper."

While an Aberdare Athletic player, and still an amateur, Evans was selected for the full Wales side; he made his debut on 9 April 1927 in a 2–2 draw at home to Ireland. He won his second cap as a Cardiff City player, chosen to play Scotland on a day when the pool of players available for selection was restricted by the Football League's rule forbidding its clubs from releasing players other than to England on days when League matches were being played; this weakened team earned a 1–1 draw. He also appeared in Wales' next game, a 4–0 defeat at home to England, and his fourth and last full cap was won as a Birmingham player and a professional, in a 1–0 win against Ireland in Belfast in November 1933.

In the summer of 1929, Evans was part of a Football Association of Wales team which toured Canada, playing 15 matches over a five-week period where he shared the goalkeeping duties with Bert Gray.
