= Willie Summers =

Scottish footballer

Personal information
- Full name: William Summers
- Date of birth: 14 July 1893
- Place of birth: Burnbank, Scotland
- Position: Centre half

Senior career*
| Years | Team | Apps | (Gls) |
- Burnbank Athletic
| 1918–1921 | Airdrieonians | 54 | (0) |
| 1920–1921 | → St Bernard's (loan) | | |
| 1921–1927 | St Mirren | 185 | (4) |
| 1927–1932 | Bradford City | 121 | (1) |
- Newport County

International career
| 1926 | Scotland | 1 | (0) |
- * Club domestic league appearances and goals

William Summers (born 14 July 1893) was a Scottish professional footballer who played as a centre half.

== Career ==
Born in Burnbank, Summers played for Burnbank Athletic, Airdrieonians, St Bernard's, St Mirren, Bradford City, Rochdale and Newport County. For Bradford City, he made 121 appearances in the Football League; he also made 11 FA Cup appearances.

Summers also earned one international cap for Scotland in 1926.

== Sources ==
- Frost, Terry (1988). Bradford City A Complete Record 1903-1988. Breedon Books Sport. ISBN 0-907969-38-0.
