= 1919–20 British Home Championship =

Tournament details
- Host country: England, Ireland, Scotland and Wales
- Dates: 25 October 1919 –10 April 1920
- Teams: 4

Final positions
- Champions: Wales (2nd title)
- Runners-up: Scotland

Tournament statistics
- Matches played: 6
- Goals scored: 23 (3.83 per match)
- Top scorer(s): (Wales) Stan Davies (Scotland) Tom Miller (England) Bob Kelly (3 goals)

The 1919–20 British Home Championship was an international football tournament played during the 1919–20 season between the British Home Nations. Wales eventually took the title as the first of three victories they claimed during the 1920s, their last undisputed triumphs. The competition marked an important watershed in British football as part of the first full season played following the First World War, which had killed, wounded or retired many prominent players of the 1914 competition.

In the first British game after the war in October 1919, England and Ireland drew at Windsor Park, Wales and Scotland doing likewise at their first game in February 1920, shortly after Wales and Ireland had drawn in Belfast. Scotland and Wales then exerted the dominance they would display in the ensuing decade, Scotland beating Ireland 3–0 as Wales defeated England 2–1 away. In the final game, Wales relied on England to beat Scotland in order for them to win the championship, a result which came only at the end of an exhausting encounter which finished 5–4.

== Table ==
Team	Pld	W	D	L	GF	GA	GD	Pts
Wales (C)	3	1	2	0	5	4	+1	4
Scotland	3	1	1	1	8	6	+2	3
England	3	1	1	1	7	7	0	3
Ireland	3	0	2	1	3	6	−3	2

Rules for classification: 1) points. The points system worked as follows: 2 points for a win and 1 point for a draw.
(C) Champions

== Results ==
25 October 1919

Ireland	1–1	England
Ferris 70'		Cock 1'

Windsor Park, Belfast
Attendance: 30,000
Referee: Thomas R. Dougray (Scotland)

14 February 1920

Ireland	2–2	Wales
McCandless 8'; Emerson 59'		S. Davies 51', 89'

The Oval, Belfast
Attendance: 30,000
Referee: Isaac Baker (England)

26 February 1920

Wales	1–1	Scotland
Evans 5'		Cairns 78'

Ninian Park, Cardiff
Attendance: 16,000
Referee: James Mason (England)

13 March 1920

Scotland	3–0	Ireland
Wilson 8'; Morton 42'; Cunningham 55'

Celtic Park, Glasgow
Attendance: 39,757
Referee: James Mason (England)

15 March 1920

England	1–2	Wales
Buchan 7'		S. Davies 14' (pen.); Richards 35'

Highbury, London
Attendance: 21,800
Referee: Alex Jackson (Scotland)

10 April 1920

England	5–4	Scotland
Cock 9'; Quantrill 15'; Kelly 57', 73'; Morris 67'		Miller 13', 40'; Wilson 21'; Donaldson 31'

Hillsborough, Sheffield
Attendance: 35,000
Referee: Thomas Dougray (Scotland)

== Winning squad ==
- Wales

Name	Apps/Goals by opponent			Total	
Name	(Scotland) SCO	(Ireland) IRE	(England) ENG	Apps	Goals
Stan Davies	1	1/2	1/1	3	3
Joe Jones	1	1	1	3	0
Tommy Matthias	1	1	1	3	0
Billy Meredith	1	1	1	3	0
Harry Millership	1	1	1	3	0
Moses Russell	1	1	1	3	0
Dick Richards	1		1/1	2	1
Jack Evans	1/1	1		2	1
Lot Jones		1	1	2	0
Fred Keenor		1	1	2	0
Teddy Peers	1		1	2	0
Ivor Jones	1	1		2	0
Ted Vizard			1	1	0
Billy Jennings	1			1	0
William Bailiff		1		1	0
