= Fred Keenor =

Welsh footballer and manager (1894–1972)

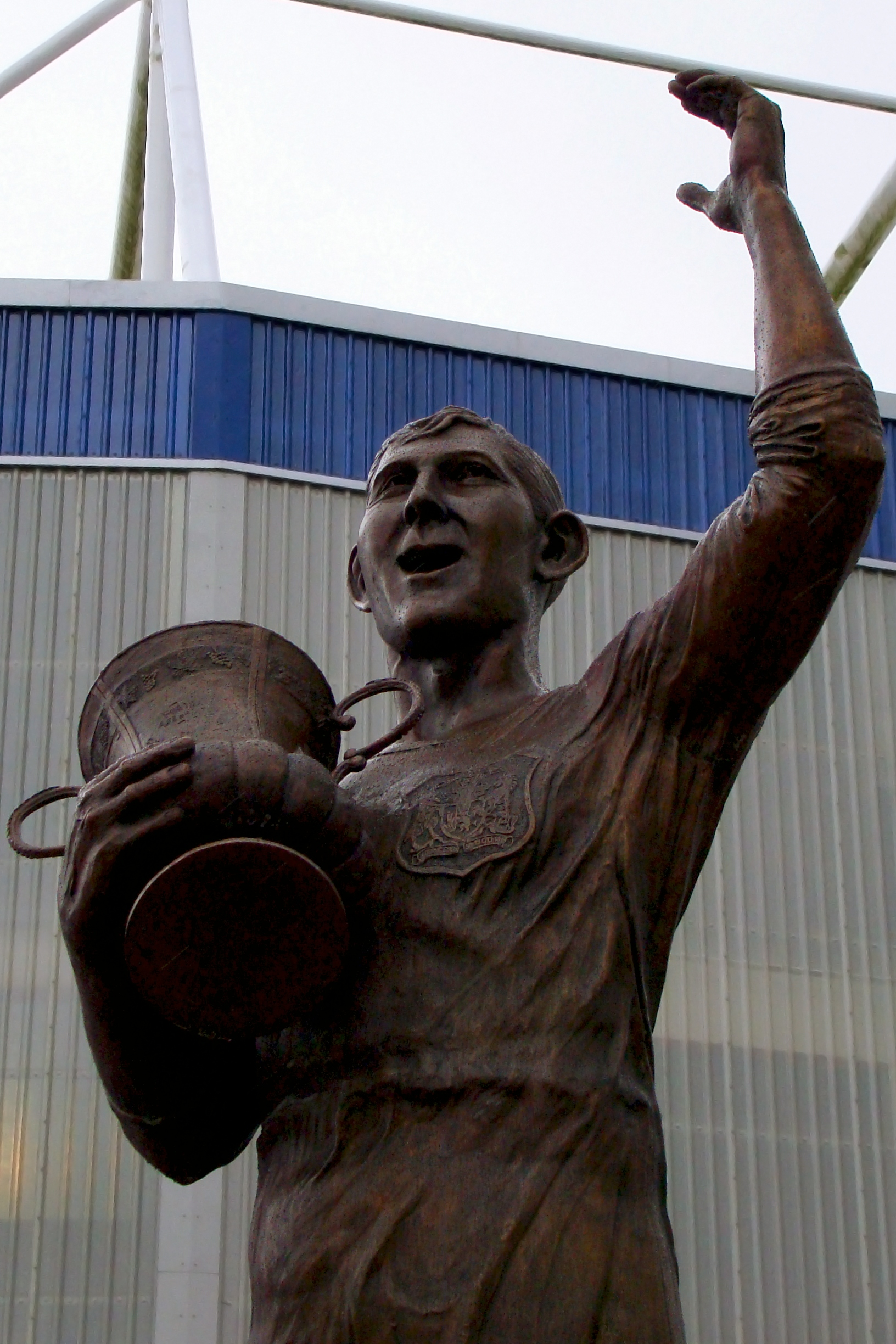
- Statue of Keenor outside the Cardiff City Stadium

Personal information
- Full name: Frederick Charles Keenor
- Date of birth: 31 July 1894
- Place of birth: Cardiff, Wales
- Date of death: 19 October 1972 (aged 78)
- Place of death: Cardiff, Wales
- Height: 5 ft 6 in (1.68 m)
- Position: Defender

Senior career*
Years	Team	Apps	(Gls)
1912–1931	Cardiff City	432	(17)
1915–1919	→ Brentford (war guest)	46	(5)
1931–1934	Crewe Alexandra	116	(5)
1934–1935	Oswestry Town		
1935–1937	Tunbridge Wells Rangers		
Total		594	(27)

International career
1920–1932	Wales	32	(2)

Managerial career
- 1934–1935: Oswestry Town
- 1935–1937: Tunbridge Wells Rangers
- * Club domestic league appearances and goals

Frederick Charles Keenor (31 July 1894 – 19 October 1972) was a Welsh professional footballer. He began his career at his hometown side Cardiff City after impressing the club's coaching staff in a trial match in 1912 organised by his former schoolteacher. A hard tackling defender, he appeared sporadically for the team in the Southern Football League before his spell at the club was interrupted by the outbreak of the First World War. Keenor served in the 17th (Service) Battalion, Middlesex Regiment, led by Major Frank Buckley, which became known as the Football Battalion. He fought in the Battle of the Somme, suffering a severe shrapnel wound to his thigh in 1916. He returned to Britain and after a lengthy rehabilitation he ended the war as a physical training instructor, reaching the rank of sergeant. He also appeared as a guest player for Brentford during the war.

Overcoming doubts about the possibility of playing again, Keenor returned to the game with Cardiff as they embarked on the most successful period in their history. They won promotion to the First Division one season after joining the Football League in 1920. Keenor helped the club to the 1925 FA Cup Final, in which Cardiff suffered a 1–0 defeat to Sheffield United. In 1926, he replaced the departing Jimmy Blair as club captain, leading the team to success in the 1927 FA Cup Final later in the season, in which they defeated Arsenal 1–0. Their triumph remains the only time the competition has been won by a team based outside England.

Keenor was released by Cardiff at the end of the 1930–31 season, which saw the club relegated to the Third Division South. During his time at Cardiff, he made more than 500 appearances for the club, winning four Welsh Cup titles, the FA Cup and the FA Charity Shield in a 19-year association with the side. He is regarded as one of the club's all-time greats. A statue of Keenor, lifting the FA Cup, was erected outside Cardiff's new ground, the Cardiff City Stadium, in November 2012 following a public fundraising campaign.

Keenor finished his career with spells at Crewe Alexandra, Oswestry Town and Tunbridge Wells Rangers. During his career, he also attained 32 caps for the Wales national football team. He helped the side win the British Home Championship three times, in 1920, 1924 and 1928, and captained the side on numerous occasions, scoring two goals. Following his death in 1972, the Football Association of Wales secretary Trevor Morris commented, "Fred Keenor will go down as one of the greatest players and greatest characters ever produced by Wales".

== Early life ==
Frederick Charles Keenor was born in Cardiff, Wales, on 31 July 1894. He was one of eleven children born to Robert and Mary Keenor. The family lived in a terraced house in Theodora Street in Roath, a working class suburb of Cardiff. His father was a stonemason in the city, working long hours to be able to afford employing Elizabeth Maler, a live-in nanny, to help his wife care for their children. Although they were not regarded as being in poverty, the family lived in cramped conditions; Keenor shared a bedroom with three of his brothers in a house that did not have an inside toilet. Their home did have electricity, which had been introduced in Cardiff fewer than ten years earlier.

Keenor developed a keen interest in football as a child, using tennis balls to play the game in his local streets. Due to the cost of footballs, he and his friends would also use rags tied together to form a ball. He attended Stacey Road Primary School in Adamsdown where he captained the school's football team for several years. He led the side to an undefeated season to win the local schools division in 1908. He was later selected to represent the city of Cardiff's schoolboy team and developed a reputation as a promising footballer. One of his former teachers, Walter Riden, went on to join the board at Cardiff City while Keenor was a player.

== Early football career ==
=== Cardiff City ===
Keenor's former teacher Riden invited him to attend a trial at Cardiff City in 1912 after spotting him playing local amateur football for Cardiff-based side Roath Wednesday. Keenor later said that he "did not think twice about it". He was impressive enough during a trial match to be offered an amateur contract with the club at the age of 17. He joined Cardiff City as the club was looking to establish itself as a professional football team having joined the newly formed Second Division of the Southern Football League two years earlier. The club's amateur side competed in the Western Football League and Keenor appeared several times in games. A loss to Camerton during a Western League fixture left a lasting impression on him after an over-confident Cardiff side suffered an upset, losing 3–1 in a match they were widely expected to win. Keenor often spoke of using the defeat as motivation in later stages of his career, remarking, "In subsequent seasons I always thought of that game when we were supposed to be on a 'good thing'. It has a moral which I pass on to every young footballer".

His whole-hearted performances for the amateur side persuaded the club to offer Keenor his first professional contract. Although he was given a wage of 10 shillings per week, he continued to work locally as a labourer. He described his two streams of income as making him "feel like a millionaire". The Cardiff squad was undergoing a significant overhaul under the management team of secretary-manager Fred Stewart and trainer George Latham; all but four of the senior team players they had inherited from previous manager Davy McDougall were released. The pair were impressed by Keenor's performances and handed him first-team opportunities at the end of the 1912–13 season. Keenor featured in two friendly matches, a 9–0 victory over Bridgend YMCA, in which he scored, and a 1–1 draw with Mid Rhondda. The presence of Billy Hardy, Patrick Cassidy and Kidder Harvey, who became known as the "holy three" by fans, restricted his first-team opportunities as the trio ensured the club won promotion to the First Division of the Southern Football League after conceding just 15 goals during the campaign. Keenor was forced to wait until 6 December 1913 to make his competitive debut for the club, playing in a 1–1 draw with Exeter City in the First Division. He endured a difficult start and was described in a local newspaper report as "the weak link in a very strong side". He made just two further appearances for the side during the remainder of the 1913–14 season. He featured in a 2–1 victory over Plymouth Argyle and a 0–0 draw with Millwall.

=== 1914–15 season ===
One can safely predict a brilliant future for him, providing of course, he is well looked after. On Saturday, he was a menace both to the Brighton attack and defence. One minute he would be tackling a Brighton forward, the next he would be leading Cardiff forwards. He is a sound tackler, places perfectly, is a hard worker and can be of great assistance to his forwards both in feeding them and taking part in combined movements.

— A match report on Keenor from Athletic News following a victory over Brighton & Hove Albion in 1914.

The following season, Keenor became much more involved in the first team at Ninian Park, Cardiff's home ground. After missing the opening game of the season, a defeat to Watford, he featured in five consecutive matches to replace an injured Cassidy. His performance during a victory over Brighton & Hove Albion earned glowing reviews in the Athletic News. Cassidy's return from injury saw Keenor drop out of the side. He did not appear for the first team from October 1914 until a match on 2 January 1915. Following this, he featured in 15 of his side's next 18 matches.

During the season, Cardiff came under pressure from local newspapers, most notably the Western Mail, for the club's perceived lack of contributions to the war effort. The Western Mail printed numerous scathing comments focused on association football clubs and even refused to report on Cardiff's matches for a time. The club later countered the paper's actions by accusing it of chasing "cheap popularity". Keenor, himself a patriot, was torn between the two, having finally established himself in the first team after three years at Ninian Park. He eventually enlisted in February 1915, along with teammate Jack Stephenson, trainer George Latham, who had previous military experience having served in the Second Boer War, and two of the club's directors. He joined the 17th Middlesex Battalion, which became known as the Football Battalion due to the many footballers who made up the core of the unit. Led by former England international Frank Buckley, the battalion had been founded by Member of Parliament (M.P.) William Joynson-Hicks, in December 1914 in the hope of attracting footballers and fans into enlisting in the armed forces.

Stationed in London with the regiment, an arrangement was made allowing players to return to their clubs for league matches to fulfill their contractual obligations. Keenor travelled by train every weekend to the venue of each Cardiff fixture to keep playing and was listed in the matchday programmes as "Private Keenor" for the remainder of the season. Cardiff finished the season in third place in the First Division. Keenor made 21 appearances in the league during the season, scoring two goals. The effects of the war effort crippled the club's finances. With travel restrictions placed on train services, and local men enlisting en masse, Cardiff's income from attendances dwindled. The situation became so dire that players were told to look for part-time jobs during the summer break in case the club was unable to pay their wages. When they threatened to strike, the club's committee approached Keenor over the possibility of forming a squad from his fellow soldiers of the Football Battalion. With the war escalating, the Football Association officially suspended all its competitions at the end of the 1914–15 season, negating any need for Keenor to raise a team.

== First World War ==
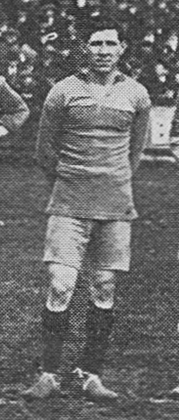
Keenor while a guest at Brentford in 1919

Keenor and his battalion were moved to the country residence of the its founder, William Joynson-Hicks, near Dorking, where they began basic training. Keenor was a notoriously poor shot with a rifle, even being described by the regimental sergeant major as "the worst shot he had ever seen". During their posting, the battalion organised a fixture against Cardiff City on 2 October 1915. Keenor was originally due to play for the army side against his club, but Cardiff manager Fred Stewart asked that he play for his club side. The match ended in a 1–0 victory for the battalion.

One month after the match, on 16 November, Keenor and his battalion began the journey to France to join the front lines. They billeted in the village of Les Ciseaux for one month before moving to the city of Béthune. Most of his posting during his battalion's first months in France involved training and guard duty. On 9 December 1915, they were posted to Annequin near the front line. They were soon moved into the main trenches, which were knee-deep in mud and infested with rats. His battalion remained on duty until 22 December when they were relieved, resting in the nearby village of Beuvry over Christmas. Cardiff City organised regular collections at their wartime fixtures during this period to send parcels to Keenor and Jack Stephenson containing letters from fans and home comforts. The Middlesex Battalion claimed the Divisional Football Cup with relative ease, defeating a team from the 34th Brigade 11–0 in the final on 11 April 1916; each player received a winners' medal made of bronze.

The war soon took its toll on the battalion as they began suffering casualties from the fighting, including Buckley who suffered severe shrapnel injuries. Having returned to the front, the regiment was involved in the Battle of the Somme, one of the bloodiest battles in history, in particularly the Battle of Delville Wood. Keenor later described the scene during what he called a "hellish battle", stating:

One must pay tribute to the good work of the Footballers' Battalion. Stationed at Delville wood, Jerry's artillery threw everything he has at us – and then some. It simply rained shells. The wonder was that any of us came out alive. It was attack and counter-attack day and night, but during the battle for possession of this wood there was not a sign of cowardice among our men. Some of them may have been called "windy" on the football fields of England, but out there in France they stood the real test of all.

During the battle, Keenor was badly wounded when a piece of artillery shrapnel struck his left leg above the knee on 28 July, leaving him unable to walk. An unknown soldier saw him attempting to crawl away from the incoming fire and managed to help him back to the nearby medical facilities where army doctors were able to tend to his injury. The wound was so severe that they considered amputating the leg but decided against it. He was removed from the Western Front and transported to an army hospital in Dublin where he spent six months undergoing rehabilitation on his injured leg. Following his return to service, Keenor was stationed in Chatham, Kent, as a physical training instructor for the 5th Reserve Brigade. He was later promoted to the rank of sergeant and was awarded the Victory Medal, the 1914–15 Star and the British War Medal for his service during the war. Between 1915 and 1919, Keenor appeared as a guest for Brentford in the London Combination. During the 1918–19 season, the side won the league title with Keenor making 19 guest appearances.

== Return to football ==
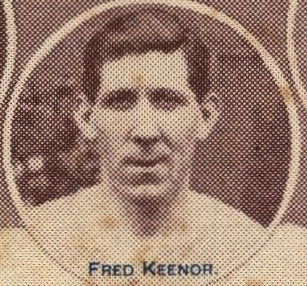
Keenor pictured in the Western Mail in 1923

After returning to Wales, Keenor hoped to resume his playing career immediately, but the Southern Football League had set no official date for its return. To support his family during the hiatus, he worked as a milkman and in a local gas works. When the Football Association resumed fixtures in 1919 following the end of hostilities, he rejoined Cardiff City, despite being told by army doctors that his shrapnel wound meant he would never play football again. He resumed playing in the Southern Football League for the club, playing his first competitive match in August 1919. Having mostly been a member of the reserve team before the outbreak of the war, Keenor returned to Cardiff as an experienced member of the squad having played for his battalion and Brentford during wartime. He featured in two of the club's three pre-season fixtures. Fred Stewart resumed his role of secretary-manager following the war. He was given a selection issue in the form of Keenor and the presence of his regular first choice Patrick Cassidy. However, Cassidy pushed for Keenor to be given the chance to play due to his "youth and promise". After this, Keenor featured regularly for the first team. Cardiff's squad had escaped the war relatively intact with most of the side returning to play. They went on to win the 1920 Welsh Cup, defeating Wrexham 2–1 in the final. They finished fourth in their final season in the Southern League, and were admitted into the Football League Second Division in 1920.

By the time Cardiff entered the Football League, Keenor had established himself in the first team. As a result, Cardiff allowed two of the "holy three", Cassidy and Harvey, to leave the club. Keenor appeared for the side in their first-ever Football League fixture, scoring in a 5–2 victory over Stockport County. In their first season, Cardiff finished second to Birmingham City, missing out on first place because of goal average after finishing level on points. They were subsequently promoted to the top tier of English football and reached the semi-final of the FA Cup, losing to fellow Second Division side Wolverhampton Wanderers in a replay. Keenor scored his side's only goal in a 2–1 defeat. He later revealed that he had been approached by an unknown person before the game who offered him a bribe to throw the match but had flatly refused to consider the idea.

After a difficult start in the First Division, losing the first six matches of the season, Cardiff secured their first victory in the top division by beating Middlesbrough 3–1 on 24 September 1921. Keenor had been switched to centre-half for the match, a move Fred Stewart had resisted for some time because of his concern over Kennor's lack of height. Away from his usual position at right-half his performance impressed so much that he would go on to play the position for the remainder of his career. The 1921–22 season was also Keenor's tenth year at Ninian Park, and he was subsequently awarded a testimonial match against Bristol City. In the following five years, Cardiff became an established side in the First Division, missing out on the league title in the 1923–24 season to Huddersfield Town on goal average after drawing the final game of the season when a win would have guaranteed them the title.

Soon after, in May 1924, the club embarked on its first-ever European tour, beginning with an ill-tempered match against Czechoslovak side Sparta Prague. The match was an intensely physical encounter with Cardiff accusing their opposition of dirty tactics. As the teams left the pitch at the end of the first-half, a furious Keenor, upset at the nature of some tackles he had received, yelled at the Prague players, "If I get anymore kicks on the shin I shall be chopping someone off at the knee". In the second-half, Cardiff players found themselves being physically assaulted by members of the crowd, who aimed kicks and punches at the players, when they approached the sidelines to take throw-ins and corner-kicks. Cardiff went on to lose the match 3–2. They later played matches against First Vienna in Austria and Borussia Dortmund and Hamburger SV in Germany. The following season, Cardiff reached the final of the 1924–25 FA Cup where they lost 1–0 to Sheffield United, who claimed their fifth FA Cup win following a goal from Fred Tunstall. After the final, Keenor stated: "Just because we lost in our very first Cup Final, I don't think there is any cause to get down in the mouth. I can say here and now that one day soon our followers can be sure that Cardiff City will bring that cup to Wales".

=== 1926–27 season ===
At the start of the 1926–27 season, the departure of club captain Jimmy Blair saw Keenor appointed the new permanent captain of the Bluebirds. He led the team to a second FA Cup final in 1927. He came close to not playing in the match as, having struggled to hold down a first team place due to injury, he handed in a transfer request in January 1927. His request was approved by board members Walter Riden and Syd Nicholls and negotiations over a proposed move to Severnside rivals Bristol Rovers were opened. The move later collapsed, with Rovers' offer being deemed unsatisfactory. Instead, Keenor returned to the starting eleven that defeated Arsenal 1–0 with a goal from Hughie Ferguson. He was praised for his leadership of the team's defence during the match and earned plaudits from opposing captain Charlie Buchan. By winning the trophy, Cardiff had become the first team outside England to win the FA Cup and Keenor, as captain, was handed the trophy by King George V.

Following the match, Keenor and the rest of the team travelled to the Palace Hotel in Bloomsbury, which hosted a celebratory dinner for the players and their wives. The next day, they returned to Cardiff, with around 150,000 people lining the streets of the city to see the team arrive. After a parade through the streets of the city, they were taken to City Hall where they were presented to the crowd by the Lord Mayor. Keenor was overawed by the adulation of the crowd, stating: "The cup was worth winning if only to get a reception like this". One newspaper published a caricature the following day, describing him as "the most important man in Wales" with an image depicting Keenor knocking former Prime Minister David Lloyd George off a pedestal. Keenor also captained the side to victory in the Welsh Cup, defeating Rhyl 2–0 in the final, and their 2–1 victory over amateur side Corinthians in the 1927 FA Charity Shield at the start of the following season.

=== Later years ===
The club entered a period of decline in the following years. Two seasons after their cup triumph and despite conceding the fewest goals in the division, Cardiff were relegated to the Second Division at the end of the 1928–29 season. An ageing Keenor became a target of frustrated fans as Cardiff suffered financial difficulties that saw the majority of the team's star names sold in a bid to raise funds. Replacements were signed from amateur sides, but the team struggled in the Second Division. Before the 1930–31 season Keenor was still on the wages he had received when the club was in the First Division. They gave him a twenty-five per cent pay cut during the season and a fifty per cent cut during the off-season. Club director Walter Bartley Wilson, who had intended to leave Keenor with no choice but to leave the club due to the severe drop in wages, instigated the cuts. Keenor told him, "Bart, I'm going to surprise you too. I'm going to take it". Despite this, he was eventually dropped from the team as they struggled for form and the club signed Jack Galbraith from Clapton Orient as a replacement. The side's form showed little improvement. Keenor played his final match for the club on 6 April 1931 against Tottenham Hotspur, along with the club's all-time record goalscorer Len Davies. They finished the season in 22nd position and were relegated to the Third Division South. Keenor was released at the end of the season, ending a 19-year spell with the side.

Following his release, he considered retiring from the game but eventually signed for Third Division North side Crewe Alexandra. Despite being 37 years old, Keenor played a pivotal part in the club's sixth-placed finish during the 1931–32 season. This was the joint highest finish that the club had ever achieved in the Football League, and only the second time they had finished in the top ten in the previous nine seasons. Despite a strong season, he was disappointed that the club was unable to achieve promotion as he described the squad as having the "nucleus of a very good side". They recorded several strong results, including defeating eventual Division Three North champions Lincoln City 8–0. Crewe later lost the return fixture against Lincoln 5–0. They conceded all five goals during an hour-long spell when Keenor had left the pitch after being knocked unconscious earlier in the match when attempting to block a shot. Although his advancing years had lessened his abilities, Keenor became a huge draw for Crewe, and if he was unable to play due to injury, the club would withhold the information before the match in fear of affecting attendance figures. He spent three years at Gresty Road, winning one final cap for Wales. At the age of 41, Keenor left the professional game, moving into non-League football. He was player-manager for Oswestry Town and then Tunbridge Wells Rangers, eventually retiring from the game in February 1937.

== International career ==
Keenor was selected to represent the Welsh schoolboy side in 1907 and appeared in the first-ever meeting between the English and Welsh schoolboy sides, playing in the match as an outside-right. He also featured in two Victory Internationals at the end of the First World War. Keenor was handed his debut for the senior team on 15 March 1920. He was named in the squad for their 2–1 victory over England in the 1919–20 British Home Championship, following the withdrawal of Billy Jennings through injury. On 16 February 1924, Keenor was handed the Wales captaincy for the first time in his career for a match against Scotland. The Scots were captained by his Cardiff teammate Jimmy Blair, making the match the first time in the history of international football that opposition teams had been captained by players from the same club side.

Keenor's senior international career coincided with a period of success for the Welsh national side and he won a total of 32 caps. They won the British Home Championship in 1920, 1924 and 1928, overcoming an increasing reluctance on the part of English clubs to release players for games they saw as being of no importance. In a match against Scotland in 1929, with Wales unable to call up a replacement, Keenor had to play with strapping to protect his injured neck and was advised by a doctor to avoid heading the ball during the game. Despite saying he was "in agony throughout", Keenor played the full 90 minutes of a 4–2 defeat.

=== Keenor and the unknowns ===
Keenor was worth two men. Bandaged and limping at the last, he was the hero of the match. The pluckiest display in the history of international football.

— Extract from the Daily Record describing Keenor's performance during the "Unknowns" match against Scotland.

In October 1930, for a fixture in Glasgow against Scotland, a heavily depleted Welsh side who were unable to call up many of their star players as Football League clubs refused to release them for international duty became known as 'Keenor and the 10 unknowns'. FAW secretary Ted Robbins' side, playing on a Saturday when the English leagues had a full programme, had no choice but to play 10 players from either the lower divisions, Welsh League sides, or from the non-leagues. The Welsh featured just seven players from Football League sides, with only Keenor and Cardiff teammates Len Evans and Walter Robbins playing in the top two divisions. The rest of the side contained three players from Welsh league sides Cardiff Corinthians, Llanelli and Colwyn Bay and one player from non-league side Oswestry Town. The side featured nine debutants in the line-up, with Keenor and Cardiff teammate Len Evans being the only two with previous experience at international level. Wales had been forced into a similar situation eight months earlier, in February 1930, when Keenor had played in a severely weakened side that lost 7–0 to Ireland. Joe Bambrick scored six of Ireland's seven goals in the game. Keenor described the match as the worst game he had ever played.

Before the match, Keenor had asked Robbins if he could have the players to himself for four hours before the game. Taking the team to relax and discuss tactics for the match, in his pre-match team talk he exhorted his teammates, "There's eleven of them and eleven of us, and there's only one ball, and it's ours". Despite their inexperience, the Welsh side held Scotland to a 1–1 draw having taken the lead after six minutes through a Tommy Bamford goal. The display led the Welsh public to call for the same side to remain for the following match against England. There was no repeat of the result; the Welsh side lost 4–0 at the Racecourse Ground. Keenor won his final cap for Wales on 26 October 1932 in a 5–2 victory over Scotland.

=== International goals ===
Results list Wales' goal tally first.

Goal	Date	Venue	Opponent	Result	Competition
1.	5 March 1923	Ninian Park, Cardiff, Wales	England	2–2	1923 British Home Championship
2.	28 February 1925	Vetch Field, Swansea, Wales	England	1–2	1925 British Home Championship

== Style of play ==
Described as possessing a "terrible" shot and unable to reliably run with the ball, Keenor's strength lay in his commitment and uncompromising tackling. Fred Stewart, who coached Keenor for more than 15 years at Cardiff City said, "I honestly do not believe the word 'beaten' is in his vocabulary." Former teammate, Ernie Curtis said of him: "He was one of the hardest tacklers in the game, some said he was dirty but he was just hard. Nobody took liberties with old Fred ... [He] could run all night, he couldn't run with the ball mind you, but he could run all day". Charlie Buchan, captain of the opposing Arsenal side in the 1927 FA Cup final, described Keenor as having "a store of energy (that) seemed inexhaustible in defending his goal". His hard-tackling style made him a target for opposition fans; he was once assaulted following a match for Crewe Alexandra during the later years of his career after a physical performance against an opposition side angered some of their fans.

Keenor was renowned for his fitness levels, despite being a heavy drinker and smoker. During training sessions at the club, he would often ignore the ball control drills used by other players and complete laps of the training pitch in heavy army boots. He was also famed for his leadership qualities. He was renowned at Cardiff City for being a vocal player on the pitch well before his appointment as captain in the mid-1920s, often barracking considerably more experienced players. In his biography of Keenor, James Leighton stated "he ran tirelessly for the cause and would frequently put his body on the line ... His endeavours could only inspire his teammates to reach a higher standard of play". Martin Johnes of Swansea University described Keenor as "the quintessential 'British' player: physical, committed and determined, making up in strength for what he lacked in skill. And he expected the same from those around him."

== Personal life ==
After returning from his war service, Keenor met Muriel Mary Griffiths, a church organist from Swansea who had worked in a munitions factory during the First World War. They were married soon after they met, on 11 November 1919. The pair had their first child, Frederick, in May 1920. The couple went on to have seven children; their last child, Graham, was born in 1931. After establishing himself in the first team at Cardiff, he moved to Whitchurch, in a house that he had designed and helped build, and became a keen gardener, growing his own vegetables in the garden. He also purchased an Irish Terrier and entered the dog in local competitions.

Keenor's diabetes along with his hard-living lifestyle – perhaps a consequence of his tough upbringing – eventually took its toll. Following his retirement from playing professional football in the Football League, his ill health made it difficult for him to find work and earn a living. Supporters of Cardiff City held a collection during one league match to raise money for Keenor and his family. The Football Association of Wales also organised a fund for him as well as donating him some money. After a long spell in hospital for treatment of his diabetes, Keenor moved his family to Lamberhurst in 1935 to recuperate. There he and his wife ran a corner shop and raised chickens to be sold at Christmas time, alongside his player-manager role with Tunbridge Wells Rangers. He later worked at a petrol refinery in the nearby town of Hove, and volunteered for the Territorial Army, serving as a sapper in the Royal Engineers. He was discharged in June 1939 due to continuing problems with his diabetes treatment, just months before the start of the Second World War. Two of his sons, Frederick and Alfred were killed in action during the conflict. Keenor and his wife later visited the village of Fruges in northern France, where Alfred's plane had been shot down and Alfred's body was buried.

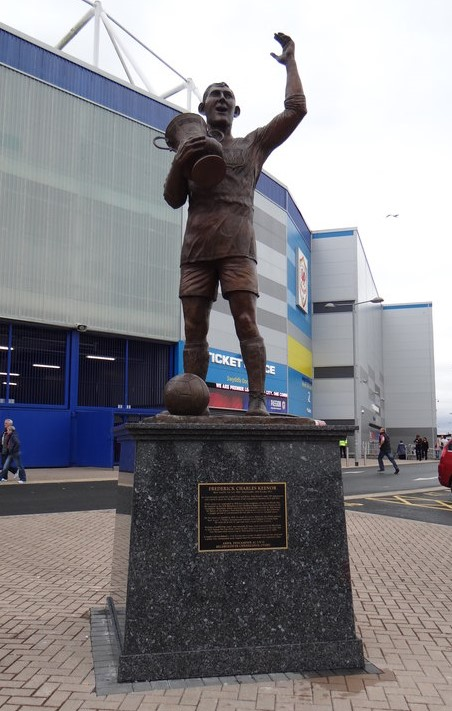
The statue of Keenor holding the FA Cup outside the Cardiff City Stadium

After the end of the Second World War, Keenor worked as a builder's labourer for several years, waking up in the early hours each morning to catch a lift in a newspaper delivery van before walking the remaining five miles to the site. He returned to Cardiff with his wife in 1958, being employed as a storeman in the building department of Cardiff Corporation. Muriel, his wife of nearly 50 years, died in 1967 when a gas leak outside their home went undetected and filled the house with poisonous gas, leaving Keenor hospitalised after being discovered by a neighbour. He made a full recovery but was deemed to need full-time care and moved into a residential nursing home in Gabalfa. He continued to attend Cardiff matches until his death on 19 October 1972. His ashes were buried in Thornhill crematorium in Cardiff. His son Graham, who had joined Cardiff City as a youth player but never appeared for the first team, served as club secretary following the resignation of Trevor Morris between 1959 and 1972. He left the post just days after his father's death.

== Legacy ==
Keenor is considered to be one of Cardiff City's all-time great players and was inducted into the Welsh Sports Hall of Fame. On 15 November 2007, a petition to the Cardiff Civic Authorities was begun, to bestow a tribute both upon Keenor and upon the 1927 FA Cup squad he captained. On 4 December 2009, the road approaching Cardiff City Stadium was named Ffordd Fred Keenor (Fred Keenor Road).

In 2010, a fundraising campaign was started by the Cardiff City Supporters' Trust to raise funds for a statue of Keenor to be placed outside the club's stadium. The statue cost £85,000, which was raised through public donations and donations from the Welsh government and the Football Association of Wales. It was designed by artist Roger Andrews, who had previously designed a statue of Tasker Watkins that was erected outside the Millennium Stadium in Cardiff. On 10 November 2012, the statue of Keenor holding the FA Cup was revealed outside gate 3 of the Cardiff City Stadium.

== Career statistics ==
Appearances and goals by club, season and competition
Club	Season	League			FA Cup		Other (Note: Includes other competitive competitions, including the FA Charity Shield, Welsh Cup and the Football League Third Division North Cup.)		Total	
Club	Season	Division	Apps	Goals	Apps	Goals	Apps	Goals	Apps	Goals
Cardiff City	1913–14	SL First Division	3	0	0	0	0	0	3	0
Cardiff City	1914–15	SL First Division	21	2	0	0	0	0	21	2
Cardiff City	1919–20	SL First Division	37	2	3	0	4	1	44	3
Cardiff City	1920–21	Second Division	38	4	7	1	0	0	45	5
Cardiff City	1921–22	First Division	27	1	1	0	3	2	31	3
Cardiff City	1922–23	First Division	38	3	4	0	4	2	46	5
Cardiff City	1923–24	First Division	39	1	6	0	4	0	49	1
Cardiff City	1924–25	First Division	36	0	8	0	0	0	44	0
Cardiff City	1925–26	First Division	25	2	0	0	0	0	25	2
Cardiff City	1926–27	First Division	33	1	5	0	4	0	42	1
Cardiff City	1927–28	First Division	36	0	3	0	6	0	45	0
Cardiff City	1928–29	First Division	36	0	1	0	4	0	41	0
Cardiff City	1929–30	Second Division	36	0	2	0	3	0	41	0
Cardiff City	1930–31	Second Division	27	1	2	0	1	0	30	1
Cardiff City	Total		432	17	42	1	33	5	507	23
Crewe Alexandra	1931–32	Third Division North	38	0	2	0	0	0	40	0
Crewe Alexandra	1932–33	Third Division North	39	3	2	0	0	0	41	3
Crewe Alexandra	1933–34	Third Division North	39	2	1	0	1	0	41	2
Crewe Alexandra	Total		116	5	5	0	1	0	122	5
Career total			548	22	47	1	34	5	629	27

== Honours ==
Cardiff City

- FA Cup: 1926–27; runner-up: 1924–25
- FA Charity Shield: 1927
- Welsh Cup: 1923, 1927, 1928, 1930; runner-up: 1929
- Football League Second Division runner-up: 1920–21

Brentford

- London Combination: 1918–19

Wales

- British Home Championship: 1919–20, 1923–24, 1927–28
