= Billy Gillespie =

Irish footballer (1891–1981)

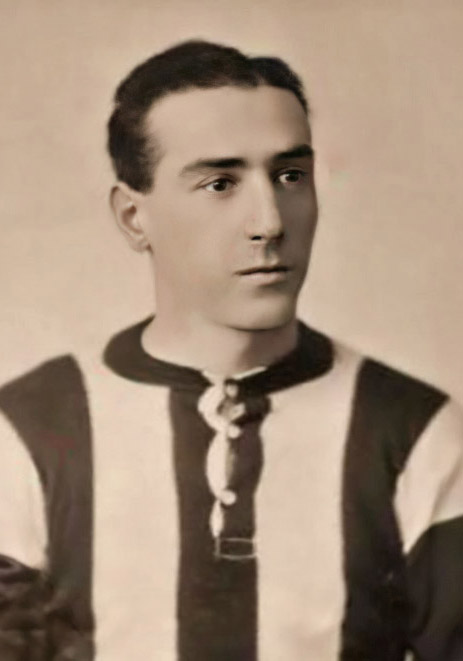
- Portrait photo of Gillespie c. 1915

Personal information
- Full name: William Ballintrae Gillespie
- Date of birth: 6 August 1891
- Place of birth: Kerrykeel, Ireland
- Date of death: 2 July 1981 (aged 89)
- Place of death: Bexley, England
- Height: 5 ft 9 in (1.75 m)
- Position: Forward

Senior career*
Years	Team	Apps	(Gls)
1907–1910	Institute		
1910–1912	Leeds City	24	(10)
1912–1933	Sheffield United	448	(127)
Total		472	(137)

International career
1913–1930	Ireland	25	(13)

Managerial career
- 1932–1940: Derry City
- * Club domestic league appearances and goals

William Ballintrae Gillespie (6 August 1891 – 2 July 1981) was an Irish football player who played as a striker for Sheffield United over a twenty-year period from 1913 to 1932, scoring over 137 League and Cup goals in 492 games for the Yorkshire side. Gillespie was born in Kerrykeel, County Donegal, Ireland and began his career with Irish side Institute in 1907. After a short spell with Linfield he moved to England to play for Leeds City in 1910 before moving to Sheffield United in 1912, where he would stay until he retired from playing. Gillespie also made 25 appearances for the Ireland national team. In 1932 he took over as manager of Derry City where he remained until 1940. After leaving Derry, Gillespie moved to the south of England where he lived until his death in 1981.

== Club career ==
=== Institute and Leeds City ===
Gillespie started his footballing career with local side Institute in 1907. In 1910, Gillespie had a short trial with Irish side Linfield and was due to sign for them when Leeds City manager Frank Scott-Walford persuaded him to turn professional and join the Yorkshire club instead. Having made his Football League debut, Gillespie was largely confined to the reserves but was unhappy at not making further progress.

=== Sheffield United ===
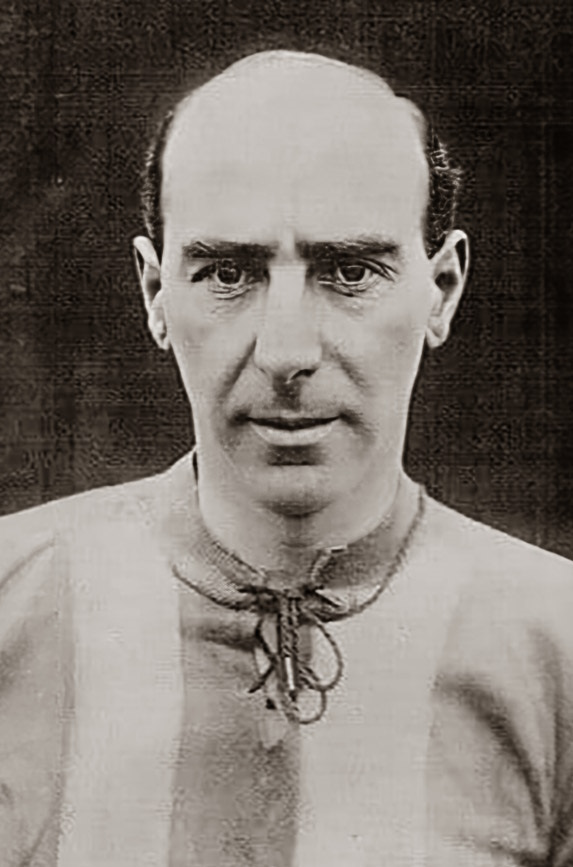
Gillespie around 1925

Sheffield United signed Gillespie from Leeds City in December 1912 for £500 for the maximum wage, which at the time was £4 per week. Gillespie made his debut on Boxing Day 1911, scoring in a 2–2 draw with Newcastle United and played regularly for the Blades from that point on. Gillespie was denied an FA Cup Winner's medal in 1915, when he missed United's victory with a broken leg, received in the first game of the season against Sunderland in September 1914. Following the end of World War I, Gillespie returned to United and resumed his place in the first-team, although now playing a more withdrawn role as an inside forward. Continuing to play regularly, Gillespie took over as club captain from George Utley in 1923 and in the following five seasons helped United reach two FA Cup semi-finals and finally won a winner's medal in 1925. Retaining his position for a further three years, Gillespie began coaching United's young players during the 1930–31 season, before retiring from playing at the end of that season.

== Managerial career ==
=== Derry City ===
Gillespie was offered the position of manager of Derry City in 1932, where he remained until 1940. Gillespie was held in such regard that the club agreed to change their strip to red and white stripes in recognition of his career at Sheffield United. Following World War II he continued with his connection to United, acting as a scout for his former team and compiling match and player reports until the 1970s.

== International career ==
His first cap came in 1913, his two goals giving Ireland their very first victory over England. He was a part of the Ireland side that won the 1914 British Home Championship outright after gaining wins over England and Wales and a draw against Scotland at Windsor Park. Gillespie scored seven goals against England, matching a record set by Scotland players Geordie Ker and John Smith. Gillespie played for the Ireland national team operated by the Irish Football Association (IFA), which now operates the Northern Ireland national football team. Gillespie held the IFA record for most international goals scored for 78 years, with 13 goals. His record was equalled by Colin Clarke in 1992 and broken by David Healy in 2004.

== Personal life ==
Gillespie was born in Kerrykeel, County Donegal, where his father was a constable with the RIC. Gillespie was married to Ida Grace Burrell (source Ancestry UK) married 1917 Sheffield and had two children, Billy and Peter. Gillespie served as a gunner during World War I, during which time he lost most of his hair. During World War II he returned to Sheffield where he worked at Hadfields munitions works. Gillespie moved to the south of England following his retirement and died in his sleep in Bexley, London, on 2 July 1981, aged 89. In September 2013, a commemorative plaque was erected at Rab's Park, Kerrykeel, the local community sport field, in recognition of Gillespie's achievements and his links to the town.

== Career statistics ==
=== Club ===
Season	Division	League Apps	League Goals	FA Cup Apps	FA Cup Goals	Other Apps	Other Goals	Total Apps	Total Goals
1911–12	One	17	11	1	0	0	0	18	11
1912–13	One	25	8	1	1	0	0	26	9
1913–14	One	30	12	8	2	0	0	38	14
1914–15	One	1	0	0	0	0	0	1	0
1915–16	Midland	0	0	0	0	30	10	30	10
1916–17	Midland	0	0	0	0	24	6	24	6
1917–18	Midland	0	0	0	0	1	3	1	3
1918–19	Midland	0	0	0	0	1	0	1	0
1919–20	One	29	4	2	0	0	0	31	4
1920–21	One	33	4	1	0	0	0	34	4
1921–22	One	31	14	0	0	2	0	33	14
1922–23	One	34	9	9	3	2	2	45	13
1923–24	One	38	14	1	0	2	2	41	16
1924–25	One	38	9	6	0	1	0	45	9
1925–26	One	39	12	2	1	1	0	43	13
1926–27	One	38	11	1	0	2	0	41	11
1927–28	One	34	5	8	1	0	0	42	6
1928–29	One	30	6	1	1	2	0	33	7
1929–30	One	14	5	0	0	1	0	15	5
1930–31	One	16	3	3	0	1	2	20	5
1931–32	One	1	0	0	0	0	0	1	0
	Total	448	127	44	9	71	25	563	161

=== International ===
Scores and results list Ireland/Northern Ireland's goal tally first.

#	Date	Venue	Opponent	Result	Competition
1	15 February 1913	Belfast, Ireland	England	2–1	1913 British Home Championship
2	15 February 1913	Belfast, Ireland	England	2–1	1913 British Home Championship
3	19 January 1914	Wrexham, Wales	Wales	2–1	1914 British Home Championship
4	19 January 1914	Wrexham, Wales	Wales	2–1	1914 British Home Championship
5	14 February 1914	Middlesbrough, England	England	3–0	1914 British Home Championship
6	22 October 1921	Belfast, Northern Ireland	England	1–1	1922 British Home Championship
7	4 March 1922	Glasgow, Scotland	Scotland	1–2	1922 British Home Championship
8	1 April 1922	Belfast, Northern Ireland	Wales	1–1	1922 British Home Championship
9	14 April 1923	Wrexham, Wales	Wales	3–0	1923 British Home Championship
10	20 October 1923	Belfast, Northern Ireland	England	2–1	1924 British Home Championship
11	22 October 1924	Liverpool, England	England	1–3	1925 British Home Championship
12	13 February 1926	Belfast, Northern Ireland	Wales	3–0	1926 British Home Championship
13	20 October 1926	Liverpool, England	England	3–3	1927 British Home Championship

== Honours ==
=== As a player ===
Sheffield United

- FA Cup: 1924–25

=== As a manager ===
Derry City

- City Cup: 1934–35, 1936–37
