= 1922–23 British Home Championship =

Tournament details
- Host country: England, Ireland, Scotland and Wales
- Dates: 21 October 1922 – 14 April 1923
- Teams: 4

Final positions
- Champions: Scotland (19th title)
- Runners-up: England

Tournament statistics
- Matches played: 6
- Goals scored: 16 (2.67 per match)
- Top scorer: (Scotland) Andy Wilson (4 goals)

The 1922–23 British Home Championship was a football tournament played between the British Home Nations during the 1922–23 season. It was won by Scotland, the strongest of the Home Nations during the decade, who almost whitewashed the other three nations but ultimately were held to a 2–2 draw by England in the final, deciding match.

England and Scotland dominated the tournament, both winning their opening matches. England began six months earlier than their opponents, defeating Ireland at home in October 1922. Scotland matched this result in their opening game in March 1923 and continued with a second victory over Wales, against whom England only managed a draw in Cardiff. In the final matches, Scotland drew with England, doing just enough to take the title by a single point. Ireland, playing for pride comprehensively beat Wales in the last match of the competition to come third.

== Table ==
Team	Pld	W	D	L	GF	GA	GD	Pts
Scotland (C)	3	2	1	0	5	2	+3	5
England	3	1	2	0	6	4	+2	4
Ireland	3	1	0	2	3	3	0	2
Wales	3	0	1	2	2	7	−5	1

Rules for classification: 1) points. The points system worked as follows: 2 points for a win and 1 point for a draw.
(C) Champions

== Results ==
21 October 1922

England	2–0	Ireland
Chambers 66', 85'

The Hawthorns, West Bromwich

3 March 1923

Ireland	0–1	Scotland
		Wilson 70'

Windsor Park, Belfast
Attendance: 30,000
Referee: Arthur Ward (England)

5 March 1923

Wales	2–2	England
Keenor 17'; Jones 86'		Chambers 36'; Watson 48'

Ninian Park, Cardiff

17 March 1923

Scotland	2–0	Wales
Wilson 6', 55'

Love Street, Paisley
Attendance: 25,000
Referee: Isaac Baker (England)

14 April 1923

Scotland	2–2	England
Cunningham 28'; Wilson 55'		Kelly 22'; Watson 42'

Hampden Park, Glasgow
Attendance: 71,000
Referee: Arthur Ward (England)

14 April 1923

Wales	0–3	Ireland
		Irvine; Gillespie

Racecourse Ground, Wrexham

== Winning squad ==
- Scotland

Name	Apps/Goals by opponent			Total	
Name	(Wales) WAL	(Ireland) IRE	(England) ENG	Apps	Goals
Andy Wilson	1/2	1/1	1/1	3	4
Jimmy Blair	1	1	1	3	0
Bill Harper	1	1	1	3	0
Jock Hutton	1	1	1	3	0
Alan Morton	1	1	1	3	0
David Steele	1	1	1	3	0
Andy Cunningham	1		1/1	2	1
Tommy Cairns	1		1	2	0
Willie Cringan	1		1	2	0
Denis Lawson			1	1	0
Tommy Muirhead			1	1	0
Jock McNab	1			1	0
Harry Ritchie	1			1	0
Sandy Archibald		1		1	0
Joe Cassidy		1		1	0
Neil McBain		1		1	0
David Morris		1		1	0
Jock White		1		1	0
