= 1923–24 British Home Championship =

Tournament details
- Host country: England, Ireland, Scotland and Wales
- Dates: 20 October 1923 – 12 April 1924
- Teams: 4

Final positions
- Champions: Wales (3rd title)
- Runners-up: Scotland

Tournament statistics
- Matches played: 6
- Goals scored: 13 (2.17 per match)
- Top scorer: (Wales) Willie Davies (2 goals)

The 1923–24 British Home Championship was an international football tournament played during the 1923–24 season between the British Home Nations. It was won by the excellent Welsh team of the early 1920s who achieved a whitewash of the other three home nations over the tournament, scoring five goals for just one in return.

Wales and Ireland began the competition the strongest, both beating their opponents. Ireland won 2–1 over England in Belfast, whilst Wales took Scotland 2–0 at Ninian Park. Scotland recovered in their second game with a strong display against Ireland at home whilst England slumped 2–0 against Wales in Blackburn. With Ireland needing a win at home to end level on points with the Welsh, a furious game in Belfast was eventually decided by a Moses Russell penalty in favour of the Welsh, who claimed the title. Playing for pride, England and Scotland struggled to a 1–1 draw in the final match which handed second place to the Scots.

== Table ==
Team	Pld	W	D	L	GF	GA	GD	Pts
Wales (C)	3	3	0	0	5	1	+4	6
Scotland	3	1	1	1	3	3	0	3
Ireland	3	1	0	2	2	4	−2	2
England	3	0	1	2	3	5	−2	1

Source: RSSSF
Rules for classification: 1) points. The points system worked as follows: 2 points for a win and 1 point for a draw.
(C) Champions

== Results ==
20 October 1923

Ireland	2–1	England
Gillespie; Croft		Bradford

Windsor Park, Belfast

16 February 1924

Wales	2–0	Scotland
W. Davies 61'; L. Davies 72'

Ninian Park, Cardiff
Attendance: 26,000
Referee: Herbert William Andrews ( (England) )

1 March 1924

Scotland	2–0	Ireland
Cunningham 85'; Morris 89'

Celtic Park, Glasgow
Attendance: 30,000
Referee: George Noel Watson ( (England) )

3 March 1924

England	1–2	Wales
Roberts		W. Davies; Vizard

Ewood Park, Blackburn

15 March 1924

Ireland	0–1	Wales
		Russell (pen.)

Windsor Park, Belfast

12 April 1924

England	1–1	Scotland
Walker 60'		Taylor 40' (o.g.)

Wembley Stadium, London
Attendance: 37,250
Referee: Thomas R. Dougray ( (Scotland) )

== Winning squad ==
- Wales

Name	Apps/Goals by opponent			Total	
Name	(Scotland) SCO	(Ireland) IRE	(England) ENG	Apps	Goals
Willie Davies	1/1	1	1/1	3	2
Len Davies	1/1	1	1	3	1
Moses Russell	1	1/1	1	3	1
Ted Vizard	1	1	1/1	3	1
Herbie Evans	1	1	1	3	0
Bert Gray	1	1	1	3	0
Jack Jenkins	1	1	1	3	0
Fred Keenor	1	1	1	3	0
Billy Jennings	1	1	1	3	0
Dick Richards	1	1	1	3	0
Jack Nicholls		1	1	2	0
Ivor Jones	1			1	0
