= Jackie Mahood (footballer) =

Irish association footballer

Personal information
- Full name: John Mahood
- Date of birth: 12 March 1898
- Place of birth: Banbridge, Ireland
- Date of death: 25 February 1984 (aged 85)
- Position: Forward

Senior career*
| Years | Team | Apps | (Gls) |
| 1922–1923 | Glentoran | 22 | (1) |
| 1923–1924 | Bangor | | |
| 1924–1933 | Belfast Celtic | | |
| 1933–1935 | Ballymena United | | |

International career
| 1924–1925 | Ireland Amateurs | 2 | (0) |
| 1925–1929 | Irish League XI | 8 | (6) |
| 1926–1933 | Ireland | 9 | (2) |
- * Club domestic league appearances and goals

John Mahood (12 March 1898 – 25 February 1984) was an Irish footballer who played for a number of Irish clubs. He featured nine times for the Ireland national football team between 1926 and 1933, scoring two goals.

== Career statistics ==
=== International ===
Appearances and goals by national team and year
| National team | Year | Apps | Goals |
|---|---|---|---|
| Ireland | 1926 | 1 | 0 |
| Ireland | 1927 | 1 | 1 |
| Ireland | 1928 | 3 | 0 |
| Ireland | 1929 | 2 | 1 |
| Ireland | 1930 | 1 | 0 |
| Ireland | 1933 | 1 | 0 |
| Total | | 9 | 2 |

=== International goals ===
Scores and results list Ireland's goal tally first.

| No | Date | Venue | Opponent | Score | Result | Competition |
|---|---|---|---|---|---|---|
| 1. | 22 October 1927 | Windsor Park, Belfast, Ireland | England | 2–0 | 2–0 | 1927–28 British Home Championship |
| 2. | 2 February 1929 | Racecourse Ground, Wrexham, Wales | Wales | 1–0 | 2–2 | 1928–29 British Home Championship |
