= William Clunas =

Scottish footballer (1899–1967)

Billy Clunas
Personal information
- Full name: William McLean Clunas
- Date of birth: 29 April 1899
- Place of birth: Johnstone, Scotland
- Date of death: 1 September 1967 (aged 68)
- Place of death: Johnstone, Scotland
- Position: Right half

Senior career*
Years	Team	Apps	(Gls)
1917–1918	Kilbarchan Athletic		
1918–1921	Johnstone		
1921–1923	St Mirren	89	(9)
1923–1931	Sunderland	256	(42)
1931–1933	Morton	63	(10)
1933–1934	Inverness Thistle		
Total		408	(61)

International career
1924–1925	Scotland	2	(1)
- * Club domestic league appearances and goals

William McLean Clunas (29 April 1899 – 1 September 1967) was a Scottish footballer who played for St Mirren, Sunderland, Morton and the Scotland national team, primarily in the right half position.

== Club career ==
Clunas was born in Johnstone, Scotland. He made his debut for Sunderland on 1 December 1923 against Huddersfield Town in a 2–1 win at Roker Park. Former Sunderland captain Raich Carter hailed Clunas as the best penalty kick taker he had ever seen; Clunas only missed two in his whole career, scoring 26. Overall, during his time at Roker Park, he made 256 league appearances and scored 42 goals, and also played 16 times in the FA Cup, scoring twice.

== International career ==
Clunas won two caps for Scotland, the first against England on 12 April 1924 in a 1–1 draw at Wembley, and the second against Wales on 31 October 1925, a 3–0 win in which he scored the last goal.
