= Willie Davies (footballer) =

Welsh footballer

Personal information
- Full name: William Davies
- Date of birth: 10 March 1900
- Place of birth: Troedyrhiw, Wales
- Date of death: 1953 (aged 52–53)
- Height: 5 ft 7 in (1.70 m)
- Position: Outside right

Senior career*
Years	Team	Apps	(Gls)
1921–1924	Swansea Town	43	(4)
1924–1928	Cardiff City	87	(17)
1928–1930	Notts County	71	(9)
1930–1933	Tottenham Hotspur	109	(19)
1933–1936	Swansea Town	86	(18)

International career
1924–1930	Wales	17	(6)
- * Club domestic league appearances and goals

William Davies (10 March 1900 – 1953) was a Welsh professional footballer who made over 300 appearances in the Football League during spells with Swansea Town, Cardiff City, Notts County and Tottenham Hotspur. He also made 17 appearances for Wales, scoring six times.

== Early life ==
Davies was born in Troedyrhiw to Thomas and Mary Davies, growing up in Harriet Town.

== Career ==
Davies began his career playing for local amateur sides, joining Rhymney where he once scored 61 goals in a single season. He was signed by Swansea Town in 1921, playing in every forward position for the club before settling at outside-right. He made his Wales debut while playing for Swansea but, in 1924 with the club going through financial trouble, he moved to Cardiff City for a fee of £25. In his first season at the club, he was part of the side that reached the FA Cup Final, including scoring a goal direct from a corner-kick in the quarter-final victory over Leicester City.

He contracted a serious chest illness soon after and missed more than a year for the club, including missing the teams FA Cup victory in 1927. He briefly returned to the side at the start of the 1927–28 season but was sold to Notts County soon after, where he spent two years before moving on to Tottenham Hotspur. He later returned to Wales to finish his league career at Swansea.

== International career ==
During his career, Davies won a total of 17 caps for Wales, making a goalscoring debut in a 2–0 victory over Scotland on 16 February 1924 in the 1924 British Home Championship. Davies played in the remaining two matches of the championship, scoring his second international goal in a 2–1 victory over England, as Wales won the tournament for the third time. He later also helped Wales win the British Home Championship for a second time in four years in 1928. His last goal for Wales came on 27 October 1928, when he scored twice in a 4–2 defeat to Scotland, before winning his last cap on 1 February 1930 when he played in a 7–0 defeat to Ireland.

== Career statistics ==
=== International ===
Appearances and goals by national team and year
National team	Year	Apps	Goals
Wales	1924	3	2
Wales	1925	4	0
Wales	1926	3	1
Wales	1928	3	3
Wales	1929	3	0
Wales	1930	1	0
Total		17	6

Wales score listed first, score column indicates score after each Davies goal

List of international goals scored by Willie Davies
No.	Date	Venue	Cap	Opponent	Score	Result	Competition	Ref.
1	16 February 1924	Ninian Park, Cardiff, Wales	1	Scotland	1–0	2–0	1923–24 British Home Championship	
2	3 March 1924	Ewood Park, Blackburn, England	2	England	1–1	2–1	1923–24 British Home Championship	
3	1 March 1926	Selhurst Park, London, England	9	England	2–1	3–1	1925–26 British Home Championship	
4	4 February 1926	Windsor Park, Belfast, Northern Ireland	11	Northern Ireland	1–0	2–1	1927–28 British Home Championship	
5	27 October 1928	Ibrox Stadium, Glasgow, Scotland	12	Scotland	1–0	2–4	1928–29 British Home Championship	
6	27 October 1928	Ibrox Stadium, Glasgow, Scotland	12	Scotland	2–4	2–4	1928–29 British Home Championship	

== Honours ==
Cardiff City

- FA Cup runner-up: 1924–25

Wales

- British Home Championship: 1924, 1928
