= 1925–26 British Home Championship =

Tournament details
- Host country: England, Ireland, Scotland and Wales
- Dates: 24 October 1925 – 17 April 1926
- Teams: 4

Final positions
- Champions: Scotland (21st title)
- Runners-up: Ireland

Tournament statistics
- Matches played: 6
- Goals scored: 15 (2.5 per match)
- Top scorer: (Scotland) Hughie Gallacher (3 goals)

The 1925–26 British Home Championship was an international football tournament played during the 1925–26 season between the British Home Nations. The competition was won at a canter by Scotland, who whitewashed all three opponents, scoring eight goals in three games without reply.

Scotland began to competition as they finished it, with a 3–0 defeat of Wales in Cardiff as England and Ireland played a tame scoreless draw as the tournament opener. Ireland improved from their poor first match performance against Wales in their second game, running out 3–0 winners to move into second place, but were hammered 4–0 by Scotland in their final game, ending any hopes of a winner's place; Hughie Gallacher scored three of Scotland's goals. England returned for the final two matches of the competition, but suffered disaster and crashed to last place as Wales won 3–1 in London and Scotland, already assured the title whatever the result, beat them by a single goal.

== Table ==
Team	Pld	W	D	L	GF	GA	GD	Pts
Scotland (C)	3	3	0	0	8	0	+8	6
Ireland	3	1	1	1	3	4	−1	3
Wales	3	1	0	2	3	7	−4	2
England	3	0	1	2	1	4	−3	1

Rules for classification: 1) points. The points system worked as follows: 2 points for a win and 1 point for a draw.
(C) Champions

== Results ==
24 October 1925

Ireland	0–0	England

Windsor Park, Belfast

31 October 1925

Wales	0–3	Scotland
		Duncan 70'; McLean 80'; Clunas 82'

Ninian Park, Cardiff
Attendance: 25,000
Referee: Ernest Pinckston (England)

13 February 1926

Ireland	3–0	Wales
Curran; Gillespie

Windsor Park, Belfast

27 February 1926

Scotland	4–0	Ireland
Gallacher 15', 60', 65'; Cunningham 42'

Ibrox Park, Glasgow
Attendance: 30,000
Referee: George Noel Watson (England)

1 March 1926

England	1–3	Wales
Walker		Fowler; W. Davies

Selhurst Park, London

17 April 1926

England	0–1	Scotland
		Jackson 36'

Old Trafford, Manchester
Attendance: 49,000
Referee: Thomas R. Dougray (Scotland)

== Winning squad ==
- Scotland

Name	Apps/Goals by opponent			Total	
Name	(Wales) WAL	(Ireland) IRE	(England) ENG	Apps	Goals
Hughie Gallacher	1	1/3	1	3	3
Alex Jackson	1	1	1/1	3	1
Jock Hutton	1	1	1	3	0
Willie McStay	1	1	1	3	0
Andy Cunningham		1/1	1	2	1
Adam McLean	1/1	1		2	1
Bill Harper		1	1	2	0
Jimmy McMullan	1		1	2	0
William Clunas	1/1			1	1
Johnny Duncan	1/1			1	1
Jimmy Gibson			1	1	0
Willie Summers			1	1	0
Alec Thomson			1	1	0
Alex Troup			1	1	0
Bob Bennie		1		1	0
Alex James	1			1	0
Jock McDougall		1		1	0
Tommy McInally		1		1	0
Willie Robb	1			1	0
Tom Townsley	1			1	0
Peter Wilson		1		1	0
