= Fred Morris (footballer, born 1893) =

English footballer

Personal information
- Full name: Frederick Morris
- Date of birth: 27 August 1893
- Place of birth: Tipton, England
- Date of death: 4 July 1962 (aged 68)
- Place of death: Tipton, England
- Height: 5 ft 8 in (1.73 m)
- Position: Inside left

Senior career*
Years	Team	Apps	(Gls)
	West Bromwich Albion	287	(118)
- Coventry City

International career
1920	England	2	(1)
- * Club domestic league appearances and goals

Frederick Morris (27 August 1893 – 4 July 1962) was an English professional footballer who played as an inside-left forward.

Morris was born in Tipton, Staffordshire. He was top scorer with 37 goals in Division One in West Bromwich Albion's League Championship-winning season of 1919–20.

He died in Tipton, aged 68.
