= 1924–25 British Home Championship =

Tournament details
- Host country: England, Ireland, Scotland and Wales
- Dates: 22 October 1924 – 18 April 1925
- Teams: 4

Final positions
- Champions: Scotland (20th title)
- Runners-up: England

Tournament statistics
- Matches played: 6
- Goals scored: 16 (2.67 per match)
- Top scorer: (Scotland) Hughie Gallacher (5 goals)

The 1924–25 British Home Championship was a football tournament played between the British Home Nations during the 1924–25 season. It was one of six tournaments in seven years won by the strong Scottish team of the early 1920s, and was achieved with a whitewash of all three rivals, including England in the deciding game in Glasgow.

Both England and Scotland began well with 3–1 victories, England over Ireland and Scotland over Wales in Swansea. England went ahead by defeating Wales away in their second game but were brought back level by Scotland who beat Ireland 3–0 at Windsor Park. In the deciding match, the Scots outplayed their Southern rivals at home, winning 2–0 to take the title. Wales and Ireland were unable to decide for third place, sharing it in a scoreless draw at Wrexham.

== Table ==
Team	Pld	W	D	L	GF	GA	GD	Pts
Scotland (C)	3	3	0	0	8	1	+7	6
England	3	2	0	1	5	4	+1	4
Wales	3	0	1	2	2	5	−3	1
Ireland	3	0	1	2	1	6	−5	1

Rules for classification: 1) points. The points system worked as follows: 2 points for a win and 1 point for a draw.
(C) Champions

== Results ==
22 October 1924

England	3–1	Ireland
Kelly 15'; Bedford 60'; Walker 70'		Gillespie

Goodison Park, Liverpool

14 February 1925

Scotland	3–1	Wales
Meiklejohn 9'; Gallacher 20', 63'		Williams 45'

Tynecastle Park, Edinburgh
Attendance: 25,000
Referee: Arthur Ward ( (England) )

28 February 1925

Wales	1–2	England
Keenor 36'		Roberts 11', 15'

Vetch Field, Swansea

28 February 1925

Ireland	0–3	Scotland
		Meiklejohn 4'; Gallacher 25'; Dunn 36'

Windsor Park, Belfast
Attendance: 41,000
Referee: George Noel Watson ( (England) )

4 April 1925

Scotland	2–0	England
Gallacher 36', 85'

Hampden Park, Glasgow
Attendance: 92,000
Referee: Arthur Ward ( (England) )

18 April 1925

Wales	0–0	Ireland

Racecourse Ground, Wrexham

== Winning squad ==
- Scotland

Name	Apps/Goals by opponent			Total	
Name	(Wales) WAL	(Ireland) IRE	(England) ENG	Apps	Goals
Hughie Gallacher	1/2	1/1	1/2	3	5
Davie Meiklejohn	1/1	1/1	1	3	2
Tommy Cairns	1	1	1	3	0
Bill Harper	1	1	1	3	0
Alex Jackson	1	1	1	3	0
Willie McStay	1	1	1	3	0
David Morris	1	1	1	3	0
Alan Morton	1	1	1	3	0
Jimmy Dunn	1	1/1		2	1
Bob Bennie	1	1		2	0
Jimmy Nelson	1	1		2	0
Philip McCloy			1	1	0
Jimmy McMullan			1	1	0
Willie Russell			1	1	0
