= 1928–29 British Home Championship =

Tournament details
- Host country: England, Ireland, Scotland and Wales
- Dates: 22 October 1928 – 13 April 1929
- Teams: 4

Final positions
- Champions: Scotland (23rd title)
- Runners-up: England

Tournament statistics
- Matches played: 6
- Goals scored: 29 (4.83 per match)
- Top scorer: (Scotland) Hughie Gallacher (7 goals)

The 1928–29 British Home Championship was a football tournament played between the British Home Nations during the 1928–29 season. The competition was won by Scotland, who won all three matches with strong attacking football epitomised by Hughie Gallacher, who scored seven of his team's 12 goals in hat tricks over Wales and Ireland.

Both England and Scotland began strongly, England defeating the Irish at home, whilst the Scots did likewise against the Welsh in a commanding performance. England then became tournament front–runners by beating Wales away 3–2. Wales and Ireland drew 2–2 in the last game for the Welsh, a result which put both sides out of contention for tournament champion. Scotland's next match was in Ireland and the ensuing ten goal thriller made them favourites for the trophy as they put seven goals past the Irish, conceding three in return. In the final game, both England and Scotland performed strongly, but buoyed by their recent rout of the Irish in Belfast, Scotland secured the tournament with a late goal from Alec Cheyne.

== Table ==
Team	Pld	W	D	L	GF	GA	GD	Pts
Scotland (C)	3	3	0	0	12	5	+7	6
England	3	2	0	1	5	4	+1	4
Wales	3	0	1	2	6	9	−3	1
Ireland	3	0	1	2	6	11	−5	1

Rules for classification: 1) points. The points system worked as follows: 2 points for a win and 1 point for a draw.
(C) Champions

== Results ==
22 October 1928

England	2–1	Ireland
Hulme; Dean		Bambrick

Goodison Park, Liverpool

24 October 1928

Scotland	4–2	Wales
Gallacher 25', 42', 48'; Dunn 56'		W. Davies 5', 75'

Ibrox Park, Glasgow
Attendance: 55,000
Referee: Arthur H. Kingscott (England)

17 November 1928

Wales	2–3	England
Keenor; Fowler		Hulme; Hine

Vetch Field, Swansea

2 February 1929

Wales	2–2	Ireland
Mays; Warren		Mahood; McCluggage

Racecourse Ground, Wrexham

23 February 1929

Ireland	3–7	Scotland
Bambrick 16', 58'; Rowley 42'		Gallacher 3', 5', 14', 51'; Jackson 33', 82'; James 76'

Windsor Park, Belfast
Attendance: 35,000
Referee: Albert Edward Fogg (England)

13 April 1929

Scotland	1–0	England
Cheyne 89'

Hampden Park, Glasgow
Attendance: 110,512
Referee: Arthur Joseph (England)
