= Joe Bambrick =

Northern Irish footballer (1905–1983)

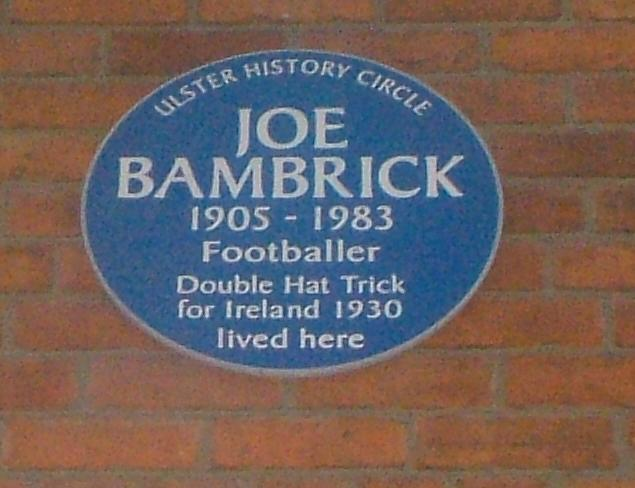
- Blue plaque noting Bambrick's home in Roden Street, Belfast

Personal information
- Full name: Joseph Gardiner Absolom Bambrick
- Date of birth: 3 November 1905
- Place of birth: Belfast, Ireland
- Date of death: 13 October 1983 (aged 77)
- Place of death: Belfast, Northern Ireland
- Position: Centre forward

Senior career*
Years	Team	Apps	(Gls)
1926–1927	Glentoran	22	(28)
1927–1935	Linfield	183	(286)
1935–1938	Chelsea	59	(34)
1938–1939	Walsall	35	(15)
Total		299	(364)

International career
1928–1938	Ireland (IFA)	11	(12)
1927–1932	Irish League XI	12	(9)
- * Club domestic league appearances and goals

Joseph Gardiner Absolom Bambrick (3 November 1905 – 13 October 1983) was a Northern Irish footballer who played as a forward for Chelsea, Walsall, Glentoran, and Linfield.

A former gas worker of medium build, he was a prolific goalscorer in the Irish League and the Football League, adept at getting into good scoring positions and athletic enough to make the final touch count. "Head, heel, or toe, slip it to Joe" became a famous catch-phrase when referring to him. His scoring of six goals for Ireland v Wales at Celtic Park on 1 February 1930 in a 7–0 win, still remains the record score for a British Isles player in an international fixture.

== Club career ==
=== Irish League ===
Bambrick began his professional career with Glentoran, spending a season there before moving to Belfast rivals Linfield. His scoring record with Linfield was phenomenal: he scored a total of 286 league goals in just 183 games, 50 of these coming in the 1930–31 season, which was the highest in the world that year. In total that season he managed 96 goals in all competitions, and his overall goal tally for Linfield was 509 goals managed in just 8 years, finishing as Irish League top scorer on four occasions.

=== Chelsea ===
On 24 December 1935, Bambrick signed for English side Chelsea for a fee of £3,000, making his debut the following day (Christmas Day) against Aston Villa. He then scored his first goal the day after (Boxing Day) also against Aston Villa at Villa Park. Bambrick scored Chelsea's goal in their highest-attended competitive match at their ground Stamford Bridge. A crowd of 82,905 watched the 1–1 draw with local rivals Arsenal on 12 October 1935. In total, he scored 38 goals in 66 appearances for Chelsea, including four hat-tricks (on two of these occasions he managed four goals).

=== Walsall ===
Bambrick gradually fell out of favour, losing the number 9 shirt to George Mills, transferring to Walsall in July 1938 where he spent a season before the outbreak of World War II led to his retirement. He returned to Linfield as a coach, but Walsall retained his registration and refused to release him to play for Linfield in war-time competitions. He eventually played for Linfield in the 1943 County Antrim Shield when he scored his final goal.

== International career ==
Bambrick scored 12 goals in 11 games for Ireland, including six in one game against Wales. His goal tally ensures that he still ranks as the joint-fourth highest goalscorer for the Northern Ireland national side.

=== International goals ===
Scores and results list Northern Ireland's goal tally first.

#	Date	Venue	Opponent	Result	Competition
1	22 October 1928	Liverpool, England	England	1–2	1929 British Home Championship
2	23 February 1929	Belfast, Northern Ireland	Scotland	3–7	1929 British Home Championship
3	23 February 1929	Belfast, Northern Ireland	Scotland	3–7	1929 British Home Championship
4	1 February 1930	Belfast, Northern Ireland	Wales	7–0	1930 British Home Championship
5	1 February 1930	Belfast, Northern Ireland	Wales	7–0	1930 British Home Championship
6	1 February 1930	Belfast, Northern Ireland	Wales	7–0	1930 British Home Championship
7	1 February 1930	Belfast, Northern Ireland	Wales	7–0	1930 British Home Championship
8	1 February 1930	Belfast, Northern Ireland	Wales	7–0	1930 British Home Championship
9	1 February 1930	Belfast, Northern Ireland	Wales	7–0	1930 British Home Championship
10	5 December 1931	Belfast, Northern Ireland	Wales	4–0	1932 British Home Championship
11	27 March 1935	Wrexham, Wales	Wales	1–3	1935 British Home Championship
12	16 March 1938	Belfast, Northern Ireland	Wales	1–0	1938 British Home Championship

== See also ==
- List of men's footballers with 500 or more goals
