= Bobby Irvine (footballer, born 1900) =

Irish footballer

Personal information
- Full name: Robert William Irvine
- Date of birth: April 29, 1900
- Place of birth: Lisburn, Ireland
- Date of death: 1979
- Place of death: Leicester, England
- Positions: Centre forward; inside forward

Senior career*
Years	Team	Apps	(Gls)
1921–1928	Everton	199	(54)
1928–1929	Portsmouth		
1929–1930	Connah's Quay		
1930–1933	Derry City		
1931	Chester	13	(9)
1933–1935	Watford F.C.		

International career
1922–1932	Ireland	15	(3)
- * Club domestic league appearances and goals

Robert William Irvine (29 April 1900 – 1979) was an Irish footballer. He played as a centre or inside forward.

== Career ==
With Connah's Quay suffering severe financial difficulties, Irvine returned to Northern Ireland, signing for Derry City. He marked his Brandywell debut with a goal in a 1-0 Gold Cup quarter-final win over Larne on 3 September 1930. With Derry, Irvine took his caps total to 15, and in October 1932 also played twice for the Irish League, in 5-2 and 4–1 defeats by the English and Scottish Leagues respectively. During this period Irvine also briefly turned out for Chester, scoring nine times in 13 games in the Cheshire County League shortly before they were elected to The Football League in 1931.
