= Alex Jackson (footballer, born 1905) =

Scottish footballer (1905–1946)

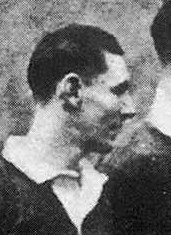
- Jackson prior to the Wembley Wizards match, 1928

Personal information
- Full name: Alexander Skinner Jackson
- Date of birth: 12 May 1905
- Place of birth: Renton, Scotland
- Date of death: 15 November 1946 (aged 41)
- Place of death: Cairo, Egypt
- Position: Outside right

Senior career*
Years	Team	Apps	(Gls)
1922–1924	Dumbarton	29	(2)
1923–1924	Bethlehem Steel	28	(14)
1924–1925	Aberdeen	34	(8)
1925–1930	Huddersfield Town	179	(70)
1930–1932	Chelsea	65	(26)
1932–1933	Ashton National	18	(11)
1933	Margate		
1933–1934	OGC Nice		
1934–1936	Le Touquet		

International career
1925–1930	Scotland	17	(8)
- * Club domestic league appearances and goals

Alexander Skinner Jackson (12 May 1905 – 15 November 1946) was a Scottish footballer who played for clubs including Dumbarton, Bethlehem Steel, Aberdeen, Huddersfield Town, Chelsea and Nice; he won the English Football League title with Huddersfield in 1925–26. Jackson received 17 international caps for Scotland over a five-year period, and was a member of the 1928 team that became known as the 'Wembley Wizards' after defeating England 5–1 in London, scoring three of those goals.

== Football career ==
=== Club ===
Jackson was born and raised in Renton. A highly talented outside right, known as the Gay Cavalier, he was particularly adept at dribbling and free kicks. He initially played for Renton Victoria but was transferred to Dumbarton in 1922 for the pre-inflation price of a football. In 1923, he left Scotland to play in the American Soccer League with Bethlehem Steel alongside his elder brother Wattie, before both returned to Scotland to play for Aberdeen.

After an impressive debut season for the Dons he joined Huddersfield Town, then the reigning League Champions, for a record £5000. Jackson helped Huddersfield retain their league title in 1925–26 and the runners-up spot in the following two years. He also led them to two FA Cup Finals: he scored in the 1928 final against Blackburn Rovers, but Huddersfield lost 3–1. In 1930 he was again on the losing side, this time against Arsenal.

Jackson signed for David Calderhead's big-spending Chelsea in September 1930 for £8,500, joining international teammates Hughie Gallacher, Tommy Law and Alec Cheyne. His time at Chelsea was hampered by injuries, though he linked up well with the prolific Gallacher and scored 31 goals from 78 games for the club. Jackson's first-class career ended prematurely during the 1932–33 season. Having already fallen foul of the Chelsea hierarchy for activities relating to the public house he operated, he and several other star players at the club were approached by the French side Nîmes with a lucrative contract offer, which Jackson threatened to accept unless Chelsea broke their maximum wage structure and increased his salary. The club refused to budge and Jackson was forced to finish his career playing for a series of non-league clubs such as Ashton National (from Ashton-under-Lyne) and Margate. He later joined the French side Nice.

=== International ===
It was Jackson's career with the Scotland national team that he is now perhaps best remembered. He won his first cap at the age of 19 and scored the winning goal against England to clinch the 1925–26 British Home Championship. He was one of the Wembley Wizards, the Scotland side that beat England 5–1 at Wembley in March 1928; Jackson scored a hat-trick during the match. He stated that his most "glorious" match for Scotland was eleven months later, when he scored twice in a 7–3 victory over Ireland in Belfast. His international career was later hindered by a ban on Anglos (Scots who played for English clubs) as a result of a dispute between the SFA and FA, and he finished with 17 caps and eight goals, finishing on the losing side only once.

== Personal life ==
Jackson was the landlord of a public house in London's Covent Garden while playing with Chelsea, and also had a weekly newspaper column. After retiring from international football he owned greyhounds at Wandsworth Stadium. He was enthusiastic about the stadium after it was built in 1933 and his first greyhound was called Jovial Honey. He also urged the management to consider the possibility of using the stadium as a football field inside the greyhound track.

He was killed in a traffic collision whilst serving with the army, as a major in the Pioneer Corps in Egypt in 1946 aged 40. He is buried at the Fayid War Cemetery.

== Career statistics ==
=== International ===
Scores and results list Scotland's goal tally first.

#	Date	Venue	Opponent	Score	Result	Competition
1	17 April 1926	Old Trafford, Manchester	England	1–0	1–0	BHC
2	30 October 1926	Ibrox Park, Glasgow	Wales	2–0	3–0	BHC
3	30 October 1926	Ibrox Park, Glasgow	Wales	3–0	3–0	BHC
4	31 March 1928	Wembley Stadium, London	England	1–0	5–1	BHC
5	31 March 1928	Wembley Stadium, London	England	3–0	5–1	BHC
6	31 March 1928	Wembley Stadium, London	England	5–0	5–1	BHC
7	23 February 1929	Windsor Park, Belfast	Ireland	4–1	7–3	BHC
8	23 February 1929	Windsor Park, Belfast	Ireland	7–3	7–3	BHC

== Honours ==
Huddersfield Town

- FA Cup runner-up: 1927–28, 1929–30

== See also ==
- List of Scotland national football team hat-tricks
