= Wilf Lewis =

Welsh footballer

Personal information
- Full name: Wilfred Leslie Lewis
- Date of birth: 1 July 1903
- Place of birth: Swansea, Wales
- Date of death: 1976 (aged 72–73)
- Position: Striker

Senior career*
Years	Team	Apps	(Gls)
1925–1928	Swansea Town	65	(43)
1928–1930	Huddersfield Town	15	(7)
1930–1931	Derby County	8	(3)
1932–1933	Yeovil and Petters United		

International career
1927–1929	Wales	6	(3)
- * Club domestic league appearances and goals

Wilfred Leslie "Wilf" Lewis (1 July 1903 – 1976) was a former footballer, who played for Swansea Town, Huddersfield Town, Derby County and Yeovil and Petters United. He also played international football for Wales on six occasions.
