= 1927–28 British Home Championship =

Tournament details
- Host country: England, Ireland, Scotland and Wales
- Dates: 22 October 1927 – 31 March 1928
- Teams: 4

Final positions
- Champions: Wales (4th title)
- Runners-up: Ireland

Tournament statistics
- Matches played: 6
- Goals scored: 19 (3.17 per match)
- Top scorer: (Scotland) Alex Jackson (3 goals)

The 1927–28 British Home Championship was an international football tournament played during the 1927–28 season between the British Home Nations. The competition was won by Wales who did not lose a game and only dropped a single point during the tournament. This championship is most notable for what became known as the "Wembley Wizards" when a scratch Scottish team crushed a highly regarded England side 5–1 at the English national stadium of Wembley. Neither England nor Scotland placed in the top two, something that would not happen again for 56 years, until the final British Home Championship in 1984.

England had endured a dreadful run of form in the years following the First World War, only managing to even share the trophy once in the previous eight years. This trend reached its nadir in 1928, as they began the campaign with a 2–0 defeat to Ireland in Belfast. Wales and Scotland both began well, with a competitive 2–2 draw in Wrexham, Wales following this by defeating England 2–1 in Burnley to take the lead in the competition, a position they made unassailable by beating Ireland by the same scoreline in their final match. Ireland nevertheless still claimed second place by beating the Scots by a single goal in their own final match. In the last game, between England and Scotland at Wembley, Scotland decimated England with powerful attacking football from a team only recently brought together following the defeat to Ireland. This defeat gave England their lowest ELO Rating (1681) in their history.

== Table ==
Team	Pld	W	D	L	GF	GA	GD	Pts
Wales (C)	3	2	1	0	6	4	+2	5
Ireland	3	2	0	1	4	2	+2	4
Scotland	3	1	1	1	7	4	+3	3
England	3	0	0	3	2	9	−7	0

Rules for classification: 1) points. The points system worked as follows: 2 points for a win and 1 point for a draw.
(C) Champions

== Results ==
22 October 1927

Ireland	2–0	England
Mahood unknown (o.g.)

Windsor Park, Belfast

29 October 1927

Wales	2–2	Scotland
Curtis 44'; Gibson 76' (o.g.)		Gallacher 14'; Hutton 16' (pen.)

Racecourse Ground, Wrexham
Attendance: 16,000
Referee: Arthur H. Kingscott (England)

28 November 1927

England	1–2	Wales
unknown (o.g.)		Lewis unknown (o.g.)

Turf Moor, Burnley

4 February 1928

Ireland	1–2	Wales
Chambers		Lewis; W. Davies

Windsor Park, Belfast

25 February 1928

Scotland	0–1	Ireland
		Curran 13'

Firhill Stadium, Glasgow
Attendance: 54,728
Referee: Arthur Ward (England)

31 March 1928
12:30

England	1–5	Scotland
Kelly 89'		Jackson 3', 65', 86'; James 44', 67'

Wembley Stadium, London
Attendance: 80,868
Referee: William Bell (Scotland)
