= List of Heart of Midlothian F.C. players =

Below is a list of notable footballers who have played for Heart of Midlothian ("Hearts"). It generally includes only players who made more than 100 league appearances for Hearts, played in international matches while with the club, or set a club record. Some players who made a significant contribution in under 100 appearances are also included, for instance those who were a key part of the club's early history (e.g. Tom Purdie or Nick Ross). In some cases appearance records are incomplete, or the player's career may have predated the founding of the Scottish football league system in 1890–91.

== Notable players ==
Players who represented their country while at the club.
Club record holder.

Bold type indicates that the player currently plays for the club.

Key to positions

- GK — Goalkeeper
- FB — Full-back
- CB — Centre-back
- HB — Half-back
- MF — Midfielder
- W — Winger
- IF — Inside forward
- FW — Forward

Name	Nationality	Position (Note: For a full description of positions, see Association football positions.)	Hearts career	League games	League goals	Notes	References
Laurence Abrams	England	MF	1910–1914	107	8		
Stéphane Adam	France	FW	1997–2002	109	30		
James Adams	Scotland	FB	1885–1897	75	17		
Henry Allan	Scotland	FB	1897–1903	98	0		
Thomas Allan	Scotland	GK	1906–1908; 1911–1914	158	0		
Alan Anderson	Scotland	CB	1964–1976	352	21		
Andrew Anderson	Scotland	FB	1931–1944	313	4		
Davie Baird	Scotland	W	1888–1903	145	54		
Eamonn Bannon	Scotland	MF	1976–1979; 1988–1993	185	28		
Barney Battles, Jr.	Scotland	FW	1928–1936	148	136	Hearts' record goalscorer in a single season, with 44.	
Willie Bauld	Scotland	FW	1948–1962	292	183	Hearts' record competitive goalscorer.	
Isaac Begbie	Scotland	HB	1888–1900	146	4		
Mark Bell	Scotland	W	1900–1904	35	7		
Bob Bennie	Scotland	MF	1928–1933	137	5		
Christophe Berra	Scotland	CB	2003–2009; 2017–2019	204	7		
Neil Berry	Scotland	CB/MF	1984–1996	256	9		
Mirsad Bešlija	Bosnia and Herzegovina	W	2006–2008	8	0	Club record transfer fee paid (£850,000 to Genk).	
Bob Birrell	Scotland	DF	1918–1922	113	0		
Andy Black	Scotland	FW	1935–1946	136	105		
Kenny Black	Scotland	MF	1984–1989	178	15		
Willie Black	Scotland	GK	1916–1921	108	0		
Bobby Blackwood	Scotland	HB	1952–1962	136	37		
Dave Bowman	Scotland	MF	1981–1984	116	8		
Archie Boyd	Scotland	GK	1914–1916	74	0		
Thomas Breckenridge	Scotland	FW	1886–1888	0	0		
Jim Brown	Scotland	FB	1969–1979	278	21		
Jimmy Brown	Scotland	GK	1942–1952	167	0		
Albert Buick	Scotland	W	1896–1903	75	1		
Drew Busby	Scotland	MF/FW	1973–1979	178	55		
Colin Cameron	Scotland	MF	1996–2001	155	47		
Thomas Chambers	Scotland	IF	1893–1896	42	18		
Sandy Clark	Scotland	FW	1984–1988	136	35		
David Clunie	Scotland	FB	1966–1977	224	5		
Tom Collins	Scotland	FB	1903–1910	158	1		
John Colquhoun	Scotland	W	1985–1991; 1993–1996	345	66		
Alfie Conn, Sr.	Scotland	IF	1944–1958	223	115		
Charlie Cox	Scotland	HB	1944–1951	115	5		
Scott Crabbe	Scotland	FW	1987–1992	116	31		
Ian Crawford	Scotland	W	1954–1961	127	58		
Paddy Crossan	Scotland	FB	1912–1925	283	11		
Jim Cruickshank	Scotland	GK	1960–1977	394	0		
John Cumming	Scotland	HB	1950–1966	337	33		
Colin Dand	Scotland	HB	1921–1927	129	11		
Percy Dawson	England	FW	1911–1914	80	63	Left the club for a world record transfer fee.	
Arnaud Djoum	Belgium	MF	2015–2019	109	15		
Bobby Dougan	Scotland	CB	1947–1954	125	0		
Andrew Driver	England	W	2006–2013	143	18		
Jimmy Dykes	Scotland	CB	1935–1946	55	4		
Calum Elliot	Scotland	FW	2005–2011	110	14		
Jock Fairbairn	Scotland	GK	1890–1898	120	0		
Danny Ferguson	Scotland	FB	1960–1967	127	13		
Derek Ferguson	Scotland	MF	1990–1993	103	4		
George Fleming	Scotland	MF	1966–1971	132	21		
Thomas Flögel	Austria	FB/MF	1997–2002	110	8		
Donald Ford	Scotland	FW	1964–1976	253	93		
Wayne Foster	England	FW	1986–1994	160	12		
Cammy Fraser	Scotland	MF	1974–1980	152	18		
Steve Fulton	Scotland	MF	1995–2002	203	15		
Willie Gibson	Scotland	FW	1973–1981	245	85		
Freddie Glidden	Scotland	CB	1951–1958	165	2		
Alan Gordon	Scotland	FW	1961–1969	127	55		
**Craig Gordon**	Scotland	GK	2001–2007; 2020–	138	0	Club record transfer fee received (£9 million from Sunderland).	
Harry Graham	Scotland	FW	1913–1920	146	46		
Johnny Hamilton	Scotland	W	1955–1967	293	75		
Jack Harkness	Scotland	GK	1928–1936	292	0		
Paul Hartley	Scotland	MF	2003–2007	118	31		
Sandy Herd	Scotland	FB/HB	1927–1937	264	7		
Billy Higgins	Scotland	HB	1957–1967	193	11		
John Hill	Scotland	HB	1888–1892	37	3		
George Hogg	Scotland	HB	1892–1903	187	7		
David Holt	Scotland	FB	1960–1969	231	0		
Sandy Jardine	Scotland	FB/CB	1982–1987	184	3		
Jim Jefferies	Scotland	FB/CB	1972–1981	227	5		
Tom Jenkinson	Scotland	W	1884–1897	2	0	First player capped while with Hearts, in 1887.	
Roald Jensen	Norway	W	1965–1971	74	19		
John Johnstone	Scotland	CB	1921–1933	12	8		
Robert Johnstone	Scotland		1929–1935	172	31		
Eggert Jónsson	Iceland	FB	2007–2012	134	8		
Alex Kane	Scotland	GK	1919–1922	106	0		
Roy Kay	Scotland	FB	1970–1977	142	1		
Peter Kerr	Scotland	MF	1926–1930	105	4		
George Key	Scotland	HB	1899–1904	81	7		
Walter Kidd	Scotland	FB	1977–1994	366	6		
Alexander King	Scotland	IF	1895–1896	16	11		
Robert King	Scotland		1923–1932	186	1		
Laryea Kingston	Ghana	MF	2007–2010	61	9		
Andy Kirk	Northern Ireland	FW	1999–2004	109	30		
Bobby Kirk	Scotland	FB	1955–1962	213	8		
Patrick Kisnorbo	Australia	FB	2003–2005	48	1		
Davie Laing	Scotland	HB	1946–1954	191	11		
Craig Levein	Scotland	CB	1983–1995	329	15		
Gary Locke	Scotland	FB/MF	1993–2001	141	5		
Alex MacDonald	Scotland	MF	1980–1986	122	10		
Jamie MacDonald	Scotland	GK	2008–2014	116	0		
Roddie MacDonald	Scotland	CB	1981–1987	173	22		
Dave Mackay	Scotland	HB	1953–1959	135	27		
Gary Mackay	Scotland	MF	1980–1997	516	45	Hearts' record appearance holder.	
Gordon Marshall	England	GK	1956–1963	193	0		
Alex Massie	Scotland	HB	1930–1935	181	19		
Alan Maybury	Republic of Ireland	FB	2001–2005	112	4		
Neil McCann	Scotland	W	1996–1998; 2006–2008	98	18		
Duncan McClure	Scotland	FB	1933–1948	179	1		
David McCulloch	Scotland	FW	1934–1935	53	55		
Willie McFarlane	Scotland	W	1942–1951	38	4		
Ryan McGowan	Australia	FB	2010–2013	56	2		
Kevin McKenna	Canada	CB	2001–2005	122	21		
Tam McKenzie	Scotland	FB	1942–1957	254	3		
Tosh McKinlay	Scotland	FB	1988–1994	206	6		
Alan McLaren	Scotland	CB	1988–1994	182	6		
Frank McLaren	Scotland	MF	1905–1912	161	17		
Lachie McMillan	Scotland	W	1924–1931; 1933	163	50		
Dave McPherson	Scotland	CB	1987–1992; 1994–1999	295	23		
John McPherson	Scotland	CB	1888–1892	18	6		
Gary McSwegan	Scotland	FW	1998–2002	82	25		
Alex Menzies	Scotland	FW	1902–1906	40	23		
Bob Mercer	Scotland	CB	1909–1920	242	23		
Saulius Mikoliūnas	Lithuania	W	2005–2009	102	11		
John Millar	Scotland	MF	1991–1996	133	21		
Archie Miller	Scotland	HB	1931–1947	122	11		
George Miller	Scotland	FW	1915–1922; 1925–1931	223	44		
Jimmy Milne	Scotland	CB	1951–1961	143	3		
Alex Munro	Scotland	FW	1932–1937	106	20		
Jimmy Murray	Scotland	IF	1952–1961	115	63		
Tommy Murray	Scotland	MF/FW	1971–1975	104	17		
Willie Murray	Scotland	W	1923–1934	337	80		
John Murphy	Scotland	W	1919–1925	142	40		
Gary Naysmith	Scotland	FB	1996–2000	97	3		
Robbie Neilson	Scotland	FB	2000–2009	200	1		
Peter Nellies	Scotland	FB	1908–1921	339	11		
Antti Niemi	Finland	GK	1999–2002	89	0		
Derek O'Connor	Scotland	FW	1979–1984	127	47		
Tom O'Neil	Scotland	DF	1926–1933	101	0		
Ruben Palazuelos	Spain	MF	2007–2011	114	3		
Donald Park	Scotland	W	1972–1985	174	33		
Bobby Parker	Scotland	FB	1947–1957	247	19		
Callum Paterson	Scotland	DF/FW	2012–2017	137	33		
Willie Polland	Scotland	FB	1961–1967	147	2		
Willie Porteous	Scotland	FW		70	31		
Bobby Prentice	Scotland	W	1973–1979	145	12		
Steven Pressley	Scotland	CB	1998–2006	270	14		
Bob Preston	Scotland	DF	1919–1922	127	9		
Tom Purdie	Scotland	FB	1875–1881	0	0	A founding player and first captain of the club.	
Jock Ramage	Scotland	DF	1919–1926	146	7		
Willie Reid	Ireland	DF	1930–1937	134	2		
Harry Rennie	Scotland	GK	1898–1900	36	0		
Paul Ritchie	Scotland	CB	1995–2000	133	4		
John Robertson	Scotland	FW	1982–1988; 1988–1998	512	214	Hearts' record league goalscorer.	
Tommy Robertson	Scotland	W	1896–1898; 1902	28	18		
George Robson	Scotland	FW	1935–1939	115	7		
Nick Ross	Scotland	FB/FW	1881–1884	0	0		
Gilles Rousset	France	GK	1995–2000	132	0		
Davie Russell	Scotland	FW	1890–1896	82	37		
George Scott	Scotland	IL	1889–1897	222	95		
Scott Severin	Scotland	MF	1998–2004	150	13		
Jack Sharp	Scotland	FW	1915–1922	154	17		
Graham Shaw	Scotland	MF/FW	1976–1980	102	15		
Chris Shevlane	Scotland	FB	1962–1967	104	1		
George Sinclair	Scotland	W	1908–1921	326	46		
Rudi Skácel	Czech Republic	MF	2005–2006; 2010–2012	93	40	Scored goals in two Scottish Cup final victories (2006 and 2012).	
Tommy Sloan	Scotland	W	1946–1952	110	24		
Gordon Smith	Scotland	W	1959–1961	42	13	The only player to win the Scottish league with three different clubs (Hibs, Hearts and Dundee).	
Henry Smith	Scotland	GK	1981–1996	476	0		
Jimmy Smith	Scotland	W	1924–1931	164	48		
Ian Sneddon	Scotland	FB	1967–1975	129	1		
**John Souttar**	Scotland	DF/FW	2016–	99	1		
Michael Stewart	Scotland	MF	2004–2010	103	12		
Ryan Stevenson	Scotland	MF	2010–2012; 2013–2014	116	21		
Willie Taylor	Scotland	W	1889–1900	119	62		
Charlie Thomson	Scotland	CB	1898–1912	180	38		
Eddie Thomson	Scotland	CB	1967–1973	162	4		
George Thomson	Scotland	FB	1956–1961	117	14		
Gary Tierney	Scotland	FB	2003–2006	2	0		
Jim Townsend	Scotland	MF	1967–1972	107	11		
Tommy Traynor	Scotland	W	1962–1970	171	30		
Johnny Urquhart	Scotland	W	1946–1956	156	48		
Bobby Walker	Scotland	IF	1896–1914	328	124		
Jimmy Walker	Scotland	W	1944–1947	7	1		
John Walker	Scotland	FW	1893–1898	82	31		
Nicky Walker	Scotland	GK	1990–1994	50	0		
Tommy Walker	Scotland	IF	1932–1949	236	107		
**Jamie Walker**	Scotland	W	2012–2018; 2019–	169	40		
Lee Wallace	Scotland	FB	2005–2011	139	3		
Willie Wallace	Scotland	FW	1961–1966	173	91		
Jimmy Wardhaugh	Scotland	IF	1946–1960	303	206		
Fred Warren	Wales	FW	1936–1939	110			
Willie Waugh	Scotland	GK	1928–1942	113	0		
Andy Webster	Scotland	CB	2001–2013	222	11		
David Weir	Scotland	CB	1996–1999	92	8		
Jock White	Scotland	FW	1921–1934	283	155		
Willie White	Scotland	GK	1922–1928	160	0		
Brian Whittaker	Scotland	FB	1984–1990	162	1		
George Wilson	Scotland	W	1904–1906	75	29		
Jock Wilson	England	FB	1915–1925	226	0		
Willie Wilson	Scotland	FW	1912–1924	247	67		
Alex Wright	Scotland	HB	1922–1927	128	3		
Alex Young	Scotland	FW	1955–1960	155	71		
Marius Zaliukas	Lithuania	CB	2006–2013	192	11		

== Sources ==
- "HEARTS : 1946/47 – 2013/14". Neil Brown.
- "Londonhearts.com Hearts Heroes".
- Hoggan, Andrew (1995). Hearts in Art. Mainstream. ISBN 1-85158-736-5.
- Price, Norrie (1997). Gritty, Gallant, Glorius: A History and Complete Record of the Hearts, 1946-1997. Price. ISBN 0-9521426-3-5.
- Vasili, Phil (2000). Colouring Over The White Line. Mainstream. ISBN 1-84018-296-2.
