= Northern Ireland national football team results (1900–1929) =

- Win Draw Loss

The Northern Ireland national football team represents Northern Ireland in international association football. From 1882 to 1921 all of Ireland was represented by a single side, the Ireland national football team, organised by the Irish Football Association (IFA).

In 1920 Ireland was partitioned into Northern Ireland and Southern Ireland. In 1922, The south of Ireland gained independence as the Irish Free State, later to become Republic of Ireland. Amid these political upheavals, a rival football association, the Football Association of Ireland (the F.A.I.), emerged in Dublin in 1921 and organised a separate league and later a national team. In 1923, during a period when the home nations had dis-affiliated from the governing body, the FAI was recognised by FIFA as the governing body of the Irish Free State on the condition that it changed its name to the Football Association of the Irish Free State. At the same time, the IFA continued to organise its national team on an all-Ireland basis, regularly calling up Free State players. During this era at least one Northerner, Harry Chatton, also played for the Irish Free State and from 1936, the FAI began to organise their own all–Ireland team. Both teams now competed as Ireland and during this era at least 39 dual internationals were selected to represent both teams. Between 1928 and 1946 the IFA were not affiliated to FIFA and the two Ireland teams co-existed, never competing in the same competition.

In April 1951, FIFA decreed that the IFA team could not select "citizens of Eire". An exception was for British Home Championship games, as a 1923 IFAB agreement at Liverpool prevented FIFA intervention in relations between the four Home Nations. However, the exception would only apply "if the F.A. of Ireland do not object", and was never availed of.

At FIFA's 1953 congress, its Rule 3 was amended so that an international team must use "that title ... recognised politically and geographically of the countries or territories". The FAI initially claimed Rule 3 gave them the right to the name Ireland (see names of the Irish state), but FIFA subsequently ruled neither team could be referred to as Ireland, decreeing that the FAI team be officially designated as the Republic of Ireland, while the IFA team was to become Northern Ireland. The IFA objected and in 1954 was permitted to continue using the name Ireland in Home Internationals, based on the 1923 agreement. This practice was discontinued in the late 1970s. (Note: The last match played as Ireland was 1978 versus Scotland, however, apart from this match, all British Championship matches had been played as "Northern Ireland" since the 1973–74 tournament. In the 1972–73 tournament, the first two matches were played as "Ireland" and the third as "Northern Ireland". In the 1971–72 tournament, the first was played as "Ireland" and the second and third as "Northern Ireland". 1970–71 was the last tournament in which all matches were played under the name "Ireland".)

This is a list of the Ireland national football team results from 1900 to 1929.

== 1900s ==
=== 1900 ===
24 February 1900 1899–1900 British Home Championship	Wales	2–0	Ireland	Llandudno, Wales
Match 53	Parry 73'; Meredith 87' (pen.)	Report		Stadium: The Oval; Attendance: 6,000; Referee: Charles E. Sutcliffe (England)

3 March 1900 1899–1900 British Home Championship	Ireland	0–3	Scotland	Belfast, Ireland
Match 54		Report	Campbell 8', 83'; Smith 23'	Stadium: Solitude; Attendance: 6,000; Referee: Charles E. Sutcliffe (England)

17 March 1900 1899–1900 British Home Championship	Ireland	0–2	England	Dublin, Ireland
Match 55		Report	Cochrane 12' (o.g.); Sagar 16'	Stadium: Lansdowne Road; Attendance: 8,000; Referee: John Marshall (Scotland)

=== 1901 ===
23 February 1901 1900–01 British Home Championship	Scotland	11–0	Ireland	Glasgow, Scotland
Match 56	McMahon 6', 15', 40', 50'; Russell 25'; Campbell 30', 65'; Hamilton 55', 60', 70', 80'	Report		Stadium: Celtic Park; Attendance: 15,000; Referee: Richard Thomas Gough (Wales)

9 March 1901 1900–01 British Home Championship	England	3–0	Ireland	Southampton, England
Match 57	Crawshaw 9'; Hedley 83'; Foster 84'	Report		Stadium: The Dell; Attendance: 8,000; Referee: Thomas Robertson (Scotland)

23 March 1901 1900–01 British Home Championship	Ireland	0–1	Wales	Belfast, Ireland
Match 58		Report	Jones 55'	Stadium: Solitude; Attendance: 7,000; Referee: Charles E. Sutcliffe (England)

=== 1902 ===
22 February 1902 1901–02 British Home Championship	Wales	0–3	Ireland	Cardiff, Wales
Match 59		Report	Gara 40', 60', 75'	Stadium: Ninian Park; Attendance: 10,000; Referee: Arthur Kingscott (England)

1 March 1902 1901–02 British Home Championship	Ireland	1–5	Scotland	Belfast, Ireland
Match 60	Milne 88'	Report	Hamilton 43', 70', 74'; Walker 49'; Buick 76'	Stadium: Grosvenor Park; Attendance: 15,000; Referee: Frederick Bye (England)

22 March 1902 1901–02 British Home Championship	Ireland	0–1	England	Belfast, Ireland
Match 61		Report	Settle 86'	Stadium: Balmoral Showgrounds; Attendance: 12,000; Referee: Thomas Robertson (Scotland)

9 August 1902 Ibrox Disaster Fundraising Game	Ireland	0–3	Scotland	Belfast, Ireland
Match 62		Report	Speedie 30'; Campbell 40'; McDermott 60'	Stadium: Balmoral Showgrounds; Attendance: 3,000; Referee: James Torrans (Ireland)

=== 1903 ===
14 February 1903 1902–03 British Home Championship	England	4–0	Ireland	Wolverhampton, England
Match 63	Woodward 19', 52'; Sharp 63'; Davis 87'	Report		Stadium: Molineux Stadium; Attendance: 24,240; Referee: William Nunnerley (Wales)

21 March 1903 1902–03 British Home Championship	Scotland	0–2	Ireland	Glasgow, Scotland
Match 64		Report	Connor 9'; Kirwan 83'	Stadium: Celtic Park; Attendance: 17,000; Referee: Frederick Thomas Kirkham (England)

28 March 1903 1902–03 British Home Championship	Ireland	2–0	Wales	Belfast, Ireland
Match 65	Goodall 76'; Sheridan 88'	Report		Stadium: Solitude; Attendance: 14,000; Referee: Thomas Robertson (Scotland)

=== 1904 ===
12 March 1904 1903–04 British Home Championship	Ireland	1–3	England	Belfast, Ireland
Match 66	Kirwan 49'	Report	Bache 12'; Common 16', 65'	Stadium: Solitude; Attendance: 18,000; Referee: Thomas Robertson (Scotland)

21 March 1904 1903–04 British Home Championship	Wales	0–1	Ireland	Bangor, Wales
Match 67		Report	McCracken 77' (pen.)	Stadium: Penrhyn Park; Attendance: 10,000; Referee: Frederick Thomas Kirkham (England)

26 March 1904 1903–04 British Home Championship	Ireland	1–1	Scotland	Dublin, Ireland
Match 68	Sheridan 70'	Report	Hamilton 22'	Stadium: Dalymount Park; Attendance: 8,000; Referee: Frederick Thomas Kirkham (England)

=== 1905 ===
25 February 1905 1904–05 British Home Championship	England	1–1	Ireland	Middlesbrough, England
Match 69	Bloomer 50'	Report	Williamson 48' (o.g.)	Stadium: Ayresome Park; Attendance: 25,500; Referee: Thomas Robertson (Scotland)

18 March 1905 1904–05 British Home Championship	Scotland	4–0	Ireland	Glasgow, Scotland
Match 70	Thomson 14' (pen.), 61' (pen.); Walker 35'; Quinn 50'	Report		Stadium: Celtic Park; Attendance: 35,000; Referee: Frederick Thomas Kirkham (England)

8 April 1905 1904–05 British Home Championship	Ireland	2–2	Wales	Belfast, Ireland
Match 71	Murphy 25'; O'Hagan 45'	Report	Watkins 18'; Atherton 38'	Stadium: Solitude; Attendance: 15,000; Referee: Frederick Thomas Kirkham (England)

=== 1906 ===
17 February 1906 1905–06 British Home Championship	Ireland	0–5	England	Belfast, Ireland
Match 72		Report	Bond 26', 89'; Brown 32'; Harris 56'; Day 70'	Stadium: Solitude; Attendance: 16,000; Referee: Thomas Robertson (Scotland)

17 March 1906 1905–06 British Home Championship	Ireland	0–1	Scotland	Dublin, Ireland
Match 73		Report	Fitchie 52'	Stadium: Dalymount Park; Attendance: 8,000; Referee: Frederick Bye (England)

2 April 1906 1905–06 British Home Championship	Wales	4–4	Ireland	Wrexham, Wales
Match 74	Green 13', 20', 28'; Morgan-Owen 55'	Report	Sloan 10', 25', 74'; Maxwell 72'	Stadium: Racecourse Ground; Attendance: 5,000; Referee: Frederick Thomas Kirkham (England)

=== 1907 ===
16 February 1907 1906–07 British Home Championship	England	1–0	Ireland	Liverpool, England
Match 75	Hardman 53'	Report		Stadium: Goodison Park; Attendance: 22,235; Referee: Thomas Robertson (Scotland)

23 February 1907 1906–07 British Home Championship	Ireland	2–3	Wales	Belfast, Ireland
Match 76	O'Hagan 10'; Sloan 80'	Report	Morris 12'; Meredith 78'; Jones 83'	Stadium: Solitude; Attendance: 12,000; Referee: Frederick Thomas Kirkham (England)

16 March 1907 1906–07 British Home Championship	Scotland	3–0	Ireland	Glasgow, Scotland
Match 77	O'Rourke 40'; Walker 48'; Thomson 82' (pen.)	Report		Stadium: Celtic Park; Attendance: 26,000; Referee: John Lewis (England)

=== 1908 ===
15 February 1908 1907–08 British Home Championship	Ireland	1–3	England	Belfast, Ireland
Match 78	Hannon 13'	Report	Hilsdon 7', 83'; Woodward 80'	Stadium: Solitude; Attendance: 22,600; Referee: Thomas Robertson (Scotland)

14 March 1908 1907–08 British Home Championship	Ireland	0–5	Scotland	Dublin, Ireland
Match 79		Report	Quinn 3', 55', 70', 75'; Galt 23'	Stadium: Dalymount Park; Attendance: 10,000; Referee: James T. Ibbotson (England)

11 April 1908 1907–08 British Home Championship	Wales	0–1	Ireland	Aberdare, Wales
Match 80		Report	Sloan 28'	Stadium: Athletic Ground; Attendance: 6,000; Referee: James T. Ibbotson (England)

=== 1909 ===
13 February 1909 1908–09 British Home Championship	England	4–0	Ireland	Bradford, England
Match 81	George Hilsdon 50', 87' (pen.); Vivian Woodward 60', 80'	Report		Stadium: Park Avenue; Attendance: 28,000; Referee: James B. Stark (Scotland)

15 March 1909 1908–09 British Home Championship	Scotland	5–0	Ireland	Glasgow, Scotland
Match 82	McMenemy 15', 77'; MacFarlane 20'; Thomson 48'; Paul 84'	Report		Stadium: Ibrox Park; Attendance: 24,000; Referee: James Mason (England)

20 March 1909 1908–09 British Home Championship	Ireland	2–3	Wales	Belfast, Ireland
Match 83	Lacey 30'; Hunter 75'	Report	Jones 42'; Wynn 62'; Meredith 67'	Stadium: Grosvenor Park; Attendance: 8,000; Referee: James B. Stark (Scotland)

== 1910s ==
=== 1910 ===
12 February 1910 1909–10 British Home Championship	Ireland	1–1	England	Belfast, Ireland
Match 84	Thompson 43'	Report	Fleming 51'	Stadium: Solitude; Attendance: 8,000; Referee: Alexander A. Jackson (Scotland)

19 March 1910 1909–10 British Home Championship	Ireland	1–0	Scotland	Belfast, Ireland
Match 85	Thompson 54'	Report		Stadium: Windsor Park; Attendance: 17,000; Referee: Jack Howcroft (England)

11 April 1910 1909–10 British Home Championship	Wales	4–1	Ireland	Wrexham, Wales
Match 86	Evans 24', 30'; Morris 45', 72'	Report	Darling 47' (pen.)	Stadium: Racecourse Ground; Attendance: 8,000; Referee: James Mason (England)

=== 1911 ===
28 January 1911 1910–11 British Home Championship	Ireland	1–2	Wales	Belfast, Ireland
Match 87	Halligan 61'	Report	Davies 50'; Morris 84'	Stadium: Windsor Park; Attendance: 15,000; Referee: Thomas J. Rowbotham (England)

11 February 1911 1910–11 British Home Championship	England	2–1	Ireland	Derby, England
Match 88	Shepherd 20'; Evans 87'	Report	McAuley 88'	Stadium: Baseball Ground; Attendance: 20,000; Referee: David Phillips (Scotland)

18 March 1911 1910–11 British Home Championship	Scotland	2–0	Ireland	Glasgow, Scotland
Match 89	Reid 23'; McMenemy 53'	Report		Stadium: Celtic Park; Attendance: 32,000; Referee: Herbert S. Bamlett (England)

=== 1912 ===
10 February 1912 1911–12 British Home Championship	Ireland	1–6	England	Dublin, Ireland
Match 90	Hamill 35'	Report	Fleming 12', 40', 64'; Holley 17'; Freeman 50'; Simpson 85'	Stadium: Dalymount Park; Attendance: 15,000; Referee: Alexander A. Jackson (Scotland)

16 March 1912 1911–12 British Home Championship	Ireland	1–4	Scotland	Belfast, Ireland
Match 91	McKnight 42' (pen.)	Report	Aitkenhead 8', 23'; Reid 60'; Walker 70'	Stadium: Windsor Park; Attendance: 12,000; Referee: Herbert S. Bamlett (England)

13 April 1912 1911–12 British Home Championship	Wales	2–3	Ireland	Cardiff, Wales
Match 92	W. Davies 30'; D. Davies 53'	Report	McCandless 61', 85'; Brennan 65'	Stadium: Ninian Park; Attendance: 10,000; Referee: Herbert S. Bamlett (England)

=== 1913 ===
18 January 1913 1912–13 British Home Championship	Ireland	0–1	Wales	Belfast, Ireland
Match 93		Report	Roberts 15'	Stadium: Grosvenor Park; Attendance: 8,000; Referee: John Hargreaves Pearson (England)

15 February 1913 1912–13 British Home Championship	Ireland	2–1	England	Belfast, Ireland
Match 94	Gillespie 43', 75'	Report	Buchan 10'	Stadium: Windsor Park; Attendance: 20,000; Referee: Alexander A. Jackson (Scotland)

15 March 1913 1912–13 British Home Championship	Ireland	1–2	Scotland	Dublin, Ireland
Match 95	McKnight 42'	Report	Reid 16'; Bennett 32'	Stadium: Dalymount Park; Attendance: 12,000; Referee: Arthur Adams (England)

=== 1914 ===
19 January 1914 1913–14 British Home Championship	Wales	1–2	Ireland	Wrexham, Wales
Match 96	Jones 80' (pen.)	Report	Gillespie 25', 65'	Stadium: Racecourse Ground; Attendance: 5,000; Referee: Isaac Baker (England)

14 February 1914 1913–14 British Home Championship	England	0–3	Ireland	Middlesbrough, England
Match 97		Report	Lacey 6', 80'; Gillespie 36'	Stadium: Ayresome Park; Attendance: 25,000; Referee: Alexander A. Jackson (Scotland)

14 March 1914 1913–14 British Home Championship	Ireland	1–1	Scotland	Belfast, Ireland
Match 98	Young 89'	Report	Donnachie 70'	Stadium: Windsor Park; Attendance: 31,000; Referee: Herbert S. Bamlett (England)

=== 1919 ===
25 October 1919 1919–20 British Home Championship	Ireland	1–1	England	Belfast, Ireland
Match 99	Ferris 70'	Report	Cock 1'	Stadium: Windsor Park; Attendance: 30,000; Referee: Thomas R. Dougray (Scotland)

== 1920s ==
=== 1920 ===
14 February 1920 1919–20 British Home Championship	Ireland	2–2	Wales	Belfast, Ireland
Match 100	McCandless 8'; Emerson 57'	Report	Stan Davies 51', 89'	Stadium: The Oval; Attendance: 30,000; Referee: Isaac Baker (England)

13 March 1920 1919–20 British Home Championship	Scotland	3–0	Ireland	Glasgow, Scotland
Match 101	Wilson 8'; Morton 42'; Cunningham 55'	Report		Stadium: Celtic Park; Attendance: 39,757; Referee: James Mason (England)

23 October 1920 1920–21 British Home Championship	England	2–0	Ireland	Sunderland, England
Match 102	Kelly 12'; Walker 47'	Report		Stadium: Roker Park; Attendance: 22,000; Referee: Alexander A. Jackson (Scotland)

=== 1921 ===
26 February 1921 1920–21 British Home Championship	Ireland	0–2	Scotland	Belfast, Ireland
Match 103		Report	Wilson 10' (pen.); Cassidy 87'	Stadium: Windsor Park; Attendance: 35,000; Referee: Arthur Ward (England)

9 April 1921 1920–21 British Home Championship	Wales	2–1	Ireland	Swansea, Wales
Match 104	Hole 35'; Davies	Report	Chambers 60'	Stadium: Vetch Field; Attendance: 12,000; Referee: John Thomas Howcroft (England)

22 October 1921 1921–22 British Home Championship	Ireland	1–1	England	Belfast, Northern Ireland
Match 105	Gillespie 30'	Report	Kirton 35'	Stadium: Windsor Park; Attendance: 30,000; Referee: Alexander A. Jackson (Scotland)

=== 1922 ===
4 March 1922 1921–22 British Home Championship	Scotland	2–1	Ireland	Glasgow, Scotland
Match 106	Wilson 61', 83'	Report	Gillespie 43'	Stadium: Celtic Park; Attendance: 40,000; Referee: Arthur Ward (England)

1 April 1922 1921–22 British Home Championship	Ireland	1–1	Wales	Belfast, Northern Ireland
Match 107	Gillespie 7'	Report	Davies 87'	Stadium: Windsor Park; Attendance: 20,000; Referee: Arthur Ward (England)

25 May 1922 International Friendly	Norway	2–1	Ireland	Bergen, Norway
Match 108	Johnsen	Report	McKenzie	Stadium: Brann Stadion; Attendance: 8,000; Referee: G. H. Thrower (England)

21 October 1922 1922–23 British Home Championship	England	2–0	Ireland	West Bromwich, England
Match 109	Harry Chambers 66', 85'	Report		Stadium: The Hawthorns; Attendance: 20,000; Referee: Alexander A. Jackson (Scotland)

=== 1923 ===
3 March 1923 1922–23 British Home Championship	Ireland	0–1	Scotland	Belfast, Northern Ireland
Match 110		Report	Wilson 70'	Stadium: Windsor Park; Attendance: 30,000; Referee: Arthur Ward (England)

14 April 1923 1922–23 British Home Championship	Wales	0–3	Ireland	Wrexham, Wales
Match 111		Report	Irvine 15', 44'; Gillespie 16'	Stadium: Racecourse Ground; Attendance: 12,222; Referee: George D. Nunnerley (England)

20 October 1923 1923–24 British Home Championship	Ireland	2–1	England	Belfast, Northern Ireland
Match 112	Gillespie 16'; Croft 70'	Report	Bradford 7'	Stadium: Windsor Park; Attendance: 25,000; Referee: Alexander A. Jackson (Scotland)

=== 1924 ===
1 March 1924 1923–24 British Home Championship	Scotland	2–0	Ireland	Glasgow, Scotland
Match 113	Cunningham 85'; Morris 89'	Report		Stadium: Celtic Park; Attendance: 30,000; Referee: George Noel Watson (England)

15 March 1924 1923–24 British Home Championship	Ireland	0–1	Wales	Belfast, Northern Ireland
Match 114		Report	Russell 67' (pen.)	Stadium: Windsor Park; Attendance: 33,000; Referee: Arthur Kingscott (England)

24 September 1924 International Friendly	Ireland	1–2	South Africa	Belfast, Northern Ireland
Match 115	Rushe 10'	Report	Murray 44'; Green 75'	Stadium: Solitude; Attendance: 6,000; Referee: William Cowan (Northern Ireland)

22 October 1924 1924–25 British Home Championship	England	3–1	Ireland	Liverpool, England
Match 116	Kelly 15'; Bedford 60'; Walker 70'	Report	Gillespie 77'	Stadium: Goodison Park; Attendance: 30,000; Referee: Peter Craigmyle (Scotland)

=== 1925 ===
28 February 1925 1924–25 British Home Championship	Ireland	0–3	Scotland	Belfast, Northern Ireland
Match 117		Report	Meiklejohn 4'; Gallacher 25'; Dunn 36'	Stadium: Windsor Park; Attendance: 41,000; Referee: George Noel Watson (England)

18 April 1925 1924–25 British Home Championship	Wales	0–0	Ireland	Wrexham, Wales
Match 118		Report		Stadium: Racecourse Ground; Attendance: 10,000; Referee: Ernest Pinkston (England)

24 October 1925 1925–26 British Home Championship	Ireland	0–0	England	Belfast, Northern Ireland
Match 119		Report		Stadium: Windsor Park; Attendance: 30,000; Referee: William Nunnerley (Wales)

=== 1926 ===
13 February 1926 1925–26 British Home Championship	Ireland	3–0	Wales	Belfast, Northern Ireland
Match 120	Gillespie 10'; Curran 23', 80'	Report		Stadium: Windsor Park; Attendance: 25,000; Referee: Peter Craigmyle (Scotland)

27 February 1926 1925–26 British Home Championship	Scotland	4–0	Ireland	Glasgow, Scotland
Match 121	Gallacher 15', 60', 65'; Cunningham 42'	Report		Stadium: Ibrox Park; Attendance: 30,000; Referee: George Noel Watson (England)

20 October 1926 1926–27 British Home Championship	England	3–3	Ireland	Liverpool, England
Match 122	Brown 8'; Spence 47'; Bullock 80'	Report	Gillespie 5'; Irvine 44'; Davey 51'	Stadium: Anfield; Attendance: 25,000; Referee: Evan Charles Sambrooke (Wales)

=== 1927 ===
26 February 1927 1926–27 British Home Championship	Ireland	0–2	Scotland	Belfast, Northern Ireland
Match 123		Report	Morton 45', 89'	Stadium: Windsor Park; Attendance: 40,000; Referee: George Noel Watson (England)

9 April 1927 1926–27 British Home Championship	Wales	2–2	Ireland	Cardiff, Wales
Match 124	Williams 20', 31'	Report	Johnston 75', 88'	Stadium: Ninian Park; Attendance: 10,000; Referee: Ernest Pinkston (England)

22 October 1927 1927–28 British Home Championship	Ireland	2–0	England	Belfast, Northern Ireland
Match 125	Jones 36' (o.g.); Mahood 72'	Report		Stadium: Windsor Park; Attendance: 30,000; Referee: Thomas R. Dougray (Scotland)

=== 1928 ===
4 February 1928 1927–28 British Home Championship	Ireland	1–2	Wales	Belfast, Northern Ireland
Match 126	Chambers 31'	Report	Davies 6'; Lewis 55'	Stadium: Windsor Park; Attendance: 27,563; Referee: H. Hopkinson (England)

21 February 1928 International Friendly	France	4–0	Ireland	Paris, France
Match 127	Ouvray; Nicholas	Report		Stadium: Stade Buffalo; Attendance: 27,000; Referee: Paul Ruoff (Switzerland)

25 February 1928 1927–28 British Home Championship	Scotland	0–1	Ireland	Glasgow, Scotland
Match 128		Report	Curran 10'	Stadium: Firhill Stadium; Attendance: 54,723; Referee: Arthur Ward (England)

22 October 1928 1928–29 British Home Championship	England	2–1	Ireland	Liverpool, England
Match 129	Hulme 26'; Dean 77'	Report	Bambrick 32'	Stadium: Goodison Park; Attendance: 25,000; Referee: Evan Charles Sambrooke (Wales)

=== 1929 ===
2 February 1929 1928–29 British Home Championship	Wales	2–2	Ireland	Wrexham, Wales
Match 130	Mays 46'; Warren	Report	Mahood 10'; McCluggage 70' (pen.)	Stadium: Racecourse Ground; Attendance: 12,000; Referee: James Victor Pennington (England)

23 February 1929 1928–29 British Home Championship	Ireland	3–7	Scotland	Belfast, Northern Ireland
Match 131	Bambrick 16', 58'; Rowley 42'	Report	Gallacher 3', 5', 14', 51'; Jackson 33', 82'; James 76'	Stadium: Windsor Park; Attendance: 35,000; Referee: Albert Edward Fogg (England)

19 October 1929 1929–30 British Home Championship	Ireland	0–3	England	Belfast, Northern Ireland
Match 132		Report	Hine 37' (pen.); Camsell 42', 80'	Stadium: Windsor Park; Attendance: 45,000; Referee: Thomas Small
