= 1901–02 in Scottish football =

Football in Scotland
- Season: 1901–02

1901–02 in Scottish football

Division One champions
- Rangers

Division Two champions
- Port Glasgow Athletic

Scottish Cup winners
- Hibernian

Junior Cup winners
- Rutherglen Glencairn

Scotland national team
- 1902 BHC

The 1901–02 season the 29th season of competitive football in Scotland and the 12th season of the Scottish Football League.

== League competitions ==
=== Scottish League Division One ===
Pos	Team	Pld	W	D	L	GF	GA	GD	Pts	Qualification or relegation
1	Rangers (C)	18	13	2	3	43	29	+14	28	Champions
2	Celtic	18	11	4	3	38	28	+10	26	
3	Heart of Midlothian	18	10	2	6	32	21	+11	22	
4	Third Lanark	18	7	5	6	30	26	+4	19	
5	St Mirren	18	8	3	7	29	28	+1	19	
6	Hibernian	18	6	4	8	36	24	+12	16	
7	Kilmarnock	18	5	6	7	21	25	−4	16	
8	Queen's Park	18	5	4	9	21	32	−11	14	
9	Dundee	18	4	5	9	16	31	−15	13	
10	Morton	18	1	5	12	18	40	−22	7	

Source: nozdrul.plus.com
(C) Champions

=== Scottish League Division Two ===
Pos	Team	Pld	W	D	L	GF	GA	GD	Pts	Promotion or relegation
1	Port Glasgow Athletic (C, P)	22	14	4	4	75	31	+44	32	Promoted to the 1902–03 Scottish Division One
2	Partick Thistle (P)	22	13	4	5	50	29	+21	30	Promoted to the 1902–03 Scottish Division One
3	Motherwell	22	12	2	8	50	44	+6	26	
4	Airdrieonians	22	10	5	7	41	32	+9	25	
4	Hamilton Academical	22	11	3	8	45	40	+5	25	
6	St Bernard's	22	10	2	10	30	31	−1	22	
7	Ayr	22	8	5	9	27	33	−6	21	
7	Leith Athletic	22	9	3	10	34	38	−4	21	
9	East Stirlingshire	22	8	3	11	38	46	−8	19	
10	Arthurlie	22	6	5	11	32	42	−10	17	
11	Abercorn	22	4	5	13	27	59	−32	13	
11	Clyde	22	5	3	14	21	45	−24	13	

Source: statto.com
Rules for classification: Teams finish equal if level on points. Points system: 2 points for a win, 1 point for a draw, 0 points for a loss
(C) Champions; (P) Promoted

== Other honours ==
=== Cup honours ===
==== National ====
Competition	Winner	Score	Runner-up
Scottish Cup	Hibernian	2 – 1	Celtic
Scottish Qualifying Cup	Stenhousemuir	2 – 1	Motherwell
Scottish Junior Cup	Rutherglen Glencairn	1 – 0	Maryhill

==== County ====
Competition	Winner	Score	Runner-up
Aberdeenshire Cup	Aberdeen	1 – 0	Victoria United
Ayrshire Cup	Ayr Parkhouse	1 – 0	Galston
Border Cup	Vale of Leithen	1 – 0	Selkirk
Dumbartonshire Cup	Vale of Leven	3 – 1 (Note: Play off needed.)	Camelon
East of Scotland Shield	Hearts	2 – 1	Hibernian
Fife Cup	Cowdenbeath	2 – 1	Hearts of Beith
Forfarshire Cup	Dundee Wanderers	3 – 2	Arbroath
Glasgow Cup	Rangers	2 – 2	Celtic
Lanarkshire Cup	Hamilton	3 – 0	Albion Rovers
Linlithgowshire Cup	Bo'ness	3 – 1 (Note: Replay needed.)	Broxburn
North of Scotland Cup	Inverness Caledonian	3 – 1	Inverness Citadel
Perthshire Cup	St Johnstone	4 – 1	Vale of Atholl
Renfrewshire Cup	Morton	4 – 1 (Note: Aggregate over two legs.)	St Mirren
Southern Counties Cup	Dumfries	3 – 0	Maxwelltown Volunteers
Stirlingshire Cup	Stenhousemuir	1 – 0	Camelon

=== Non-league honours ===
Highland League

Top Three
Pos	Team	Pld	W	D	L	GF	GA	GD	Pts
1	Inverness Caledonian	6	4	1	1	16	6	+10	9
2	Inverness Thistle	6	2	1	3	10	13	−3	5
3	Clachnacuddin	6	1	3	2	9	8	+1	5

Source: SFHA

Other Senior Leagues

Division	Winner
Banffshire & District League	Keith Strathisla
Central Combination	Stenhousemuir
Northern League	Raith Rovers
Perthshire League	Stanley
Scottish Combination	Albion Rovers

== Glasgow Exhibition ==
Held to coincide with the Glasgow International Exhibition (1901), this early season competition was won by Rangers, beating Celtic in the final.

Competition	Winner	Score	Runner-up
Exhibition Cup	Rangers	3 – 1	Celtic
Junior Exhibition Cup	Rutherglen Glencairn	2 – 1	Maryhill

== British League Cup ==
Held at the end of the season to raise funds for survivors and widows of the 1902 Ibrox disaster, Rangers offered the International Exhibition Cup trophy for the winners of the competition – Celtic were the victors, overcoming Rangers in the final.

== Scotland national team ==
Date	Venue	Opponents	Score (Note: Scotland's score is shown first.)	Competition	Scotland scorer(s)
1 March 1902	Grosvenor Park, Belfast (A)	Ireland	5–1	BHC	Robert Hamilton (3), Bobby Walker, Albert Buick
15 March 1902	Cappielow Park, Greenock (H)	Wales	5–1	BHC	John Robertson, Albert Buick, Bobby Walker, Alex Smith, John Campbell
3 May 1902	Villa Park, Birmingham (A)	England	2–2	BHC	Bobby Templeton, Ronald Orr

Scotland were winners of the 1902 British Home Championship, but endured the deaths of 25 supporters at the Ibrox disaster on 5 April 1902.

Key:

- (H) = Home match
- (A) = Away match
- BHC = British Home Championship

Team	Pld	W	D	L	GF	GA	GD	Pts
Scotland (C)	3	2	1	0	12	4	+8	5
England	3	1	2	0	3	2	+1	4
Ireland	3	1	0	2	4	6	−2	2
Wales	3	0	1	2	1	8	−7	1

Rules for classification: 1) points. The points system worked as follows: 2 points for a win and 1 point for a draw.
(C) Champions

== Other national teams ==
=== Scottish League XI ===
Date	Venue	Opponents	Score (Note: Scottish League XI's score is shown first.)	Scotland scorer(s)
15 February 1902	Dens Park, Dundee (H)	(Northern Ireland) Irish League XI	3–0	William Maxwell (2), John McPherson
8 March 1902	St James' Park, Newcastle (A)	(England) Football League XI	3–6	John Campbell (3)
