= 1901–02 World Championship (football) =

- Event: Football World Championship
Tottenham Hotspur	Heart of Midlothian
(England)	(Scotland)

First match
Tottenham Hotspur	Heart of Midlothian
0	0
- Date: 2 September 1901
- Venue: White Hart Lane, London

Second match
Heart of Midlothian	Tottenham Hotspur
3	1
- Date: 2 January 1902
- Venue: Tynecastle Park, Edinburgh

The 1901–02 World Championship was an exhibition football match that took place at High Road Ground (the erstwhile name of White Hart Lane) on 2 September 1901 and Tynecastle Park on 2 January 1902 between the winners of the English Football Association Challenge Cup, Tottenham Hotspur, and the Scottish Cup, Heart of Midlothian.

The game was not the first "World Championship" game between English and Scottish sides; indeed, it was the second time Hearts had played this game.

The contest was won by Heart of Midlothian, winning their home leg 3–1 after a goalless draw in London.

The fact that the first leg was played by all 11 of Tottenham's cup-winning team, and nine of Hearts', indicates that it was taken seriously by both clubs.

== Participant teams ==
Team	Qualification
(England) Tottenham Hotspur	1900–01 FA Cup winners
(Scotland) Heart of Midlothian	1900–01 Scottish Cup winners

== Match details ==
=== First leg ===
2 September 1901

Tottenham Hotspur (England)	0–0	(Scotland) Heart of Midlothian
	Overview Report

White Hart Lane, London

George Clawley
Harry Erentz
Sandy Tait
Tom Morris
Ted Hughes
Jack L. Jones
Tom Smith
John Cameron
Sandy Brown
David Copeland
Jack Kirwan

GK	George McWattie
RB	Harry Allan
LB	Davie Baird
RH	George Key
CH	Albert Buick
LH	George Hogg
OR	Bill Porteous
IR	Bobby Walker
CF	Tom Lorn
IL	Bob Houston
OL	Mark Bell

=== Second leg ===
2 January 1902

Heart of Midlothian (Scotland)	3–1	(England) Tottenham Hotspur
	Overview Report

Tynecastle Park, Edinburgh

GK	George McWattie
RB	John Hogg
LB	Davie Baird
RH	Andrew McLean
CH	Albert Buick
LH	George Hogg
OR	Tom Lorn
IR	Bobby Walker
CF	Charlie Thomson
IL	Bob Houston
OL	Mark Bell

Fred Griffiths
Harry Erentz
Sandy Tait
Tom Morris
James McNaught
Jack L Jones
Tom Smith
Patrick Gilhooley
Sandy Brown
David Copeland
Jack Kirwan
