= 1902–03 Scottish Cup =

Tournament details
- Country: Scotland

Final positions
- Champions: Rangers
- Runners-up: Heart of Midlothian

The 1902–03 Scottish Cup was the 30th season of Scotland's most prestigious football knockout competition. The cup was won by Rangers when they beat Heart of Midlothian 2–0 in the final at Celtic Park after two replays to claim the trophy for a fourth time.

== Calendar ==
Round	First match date	Fixtures	Clubs
First round	24 January 1903	16	32 → 16
Second round	31 January 1903	8	16 → 8
Quarter-finals	21 February 1903	4	8 → 4
Semi-finals	28 February 1903	2	4 → 2
Final	11 April 1903	1	2 → 1

== First round ==
Home team	Score	Away team
Abercorn	2 – 2	Douglas Wanderers
Arbroath	1 – 3	Kilmarnock
Ayr	2 – 0	Camelon
Celtic	0 – 0	St Mirren
Clyde	1 – 2	Heart of Midlothian
Dundee	Walkover	Barholm Rovers
Hamilton Academical	5 – 0	Airdrieonians
Hibernian	7 – 0	Greenock Morton
Leith Athletic	4 – 1	Broxburn
Nithsdale Wanderers	1 – 0	Orion
Queen's Park	1 – 2	Motherwell
Rangers	7 – 0	Auchterarder Thistle
St Bernard's	1 – 2	Port Glasgow Athletic
Stenhousemuir	2 – 1	Inverness Caledonian
St Johnstone	1 – 10	Third Lanark
Vale of Leven	0 – 4	Partick Thistle

=== First round replay ===
Home team	Score	Away team
Douglas Wanderers	3 – 1	Abercorn
St Mirren	1 – 1	Celtic

=== First round second replay ===
Home team	Score	Away team
Celtic*	1 – 0	St Mirren

- Game Abandoned

=== First round third replay ===
Home team	Score	Away team
Celtic	4 – 0	St Mirren

== Second round ==
Home team	Score	Away team
Ayr	2 –4	Heart of Midlothian
Celtic	2 – 0	Port Glasgow Athletic
Dundee	7 – 0	Nithsdale Wanderers
Hamilton Academical	2 – 2	Third Lanark
Hibernian	4 – 1	Leith Athletic
Motherwell	0 – 2	Partick Thistle
Rangers	4 – 0	Kilmarnock
Stenhousemuir	0 – 1	Douglas Wanderers *

- Game Abandoned

=== Second round replay ===
Home team	Score	Away team
Stenhousemuir	6 – 1	Douglas Wanderers
Third Lanark	2 – 0	Hamilton Academical *

- Game Abandoned

=== Second round second replay ===
Home team	Score	Away team
Third Lanark	3 – 1	Hamilton Academical

== Quarter-final ==
Home team	Score	Away team
Celtic	0 – 3	Rangers
Dundee	0 – 0	Hibernian
Heart of Midlothian	2 – 1	Third Lanark
Stenhousemuir	3 – 0	Partick Thistle

=== Quarter-final replay ===
Home team	Score	Away team
Hibernian	0 – 0	Dundee

=== Quarter-final second replay ===
Home team	Score	Away team
Dundee	1 – 0	Hibernian

== Semi-finals ==
Home team	Score	Away team
Dundee	0 – 0	Heart of Midlothian
Stenhousemuir	1 – 4	Rangers

=== Semi-final replay ===
Home team	Score	Away team
Heart of Midlothian	1 – 0	Dundee

== Final ==
11 April 1903

Rangers	1–1	Heart of Midlothian
Stark		Bobby Walker

Celtic Park
Attendance: 30,000
Referee: T. Robertson

=== Final replay ===
18 April 1903

Rangers	0–0	Heart of Midlothian

Celtic Park
Attendance: 26,000
Referee: T. Robertson

=== Final second replay ===
25 April 1903

Rangers	2–0	Heart of Midlothian
Mackie; Hamilton

Celtic Park
Attendance: 35,000
Referee: T. Robertson

=== Teams ===
Hearts:
GK	George Philip
RB	Charlie Thomson
LB	Andrew Orr
RH	George Key
CH	Albert Buick
LH	George Hogg
OR	Robert Dalrymple
IR	Bobby Walker
CF	Bill Porteous
IL	John 'Sailor' Hunter
OL	Davie Baird
Replay:	Unchanged
2nd Replay:	John Anderson replaced Buick

Rangers:
GK	Matthew Dickie
RB	Alex Fraser
LB	Jock Drummond
RH	Neilly Gibson
CH	James Stark
LH	John Robertson
OR	Angus McDonald
IR	Finlay Speedie
CF	Robert Hamilton
IL	Johnny Walker
OL	Alex Smith
Replay:	Unchanged
2nd Replay:	George Henderson replaced Gibson; Alec Mackie replaced Walker; Drummond withdrew due to injury before half time

== See also ==
- 1902–03 in Scottish football
