= 1901 Scottish Cup final =

1901 Scottish Cup Final
- Event: 1900–01 Scottish Cup
Heart of Midlothian	Celtic
4	3
- Date: 6 April 1901
- Venue: Ibrox Stadium, Govan
- Attendance: 15,000

The 1901 Scottish Cup Final was played on 6 April 1901 at Ibrox Stadium in Glasgow and was the final of the 29th season of the Scottish Cup. Heart of Midlothian and Celtic contested the match. Hearts won the match 4–3, thanks to goals from Bobby Walker, Charles Thomson and a double from Mark Bell.

Hearts went on to play in and win the 1901–02 World Championship, beating Tottenham Hotspur.

== Final ==
6 April 1901
Scottish Cup Final

Heart of Midlothian	4–3	Celtic
Walker; Bell; Thomson		McOustra; Quinn; McMahon

Ibrox Stadium, Govan
Attendance: 15,000

=== Teams ===
Celtic:
GK	Dan McArthur
RB	Bob Davidson
LB	Barney Battles
RH	Davie Russell
CH	Willie Loney
LH	Willie Orr
OR	Willie McOustra
IR	John Divers
CF	Johnny Campbell
IL	Sandy McMahon
OL	Jimmy Quinn

Hearts:
GK	George Philip
RB	Davie Baird
LB	Albert Buick
RH	George Hogg
CH	Harry Allan
LH	George Key
OR	Bobby Walker
IR	Charlie Thomson
CF	Bob Houston
IL	Bill Porteous
OL	Mark Bell

== See also ==
Played between same clubs:

- 1907 Scottish Cup Final
- 1956 Scottish Cup Final
- 2019 Scottish Cup Final
- 2020 Scottish Cup Final
