= 1901–02 British Home Championship =

Tournament details
- Host country: England, Ireland, Scotland and Wales
- Dates: 22 February – 3 May 1902
- Teams: 4

Final positions
- Champions: Scotland (11th title)
- Runners-up: England

Tournament statistics
- Matches played: 6
- Goals scored: 22 (3.67 per match)
- Top scorer(s): (Ireland) Andy Gara (Scotland) Robert Hamilton (3 goals)

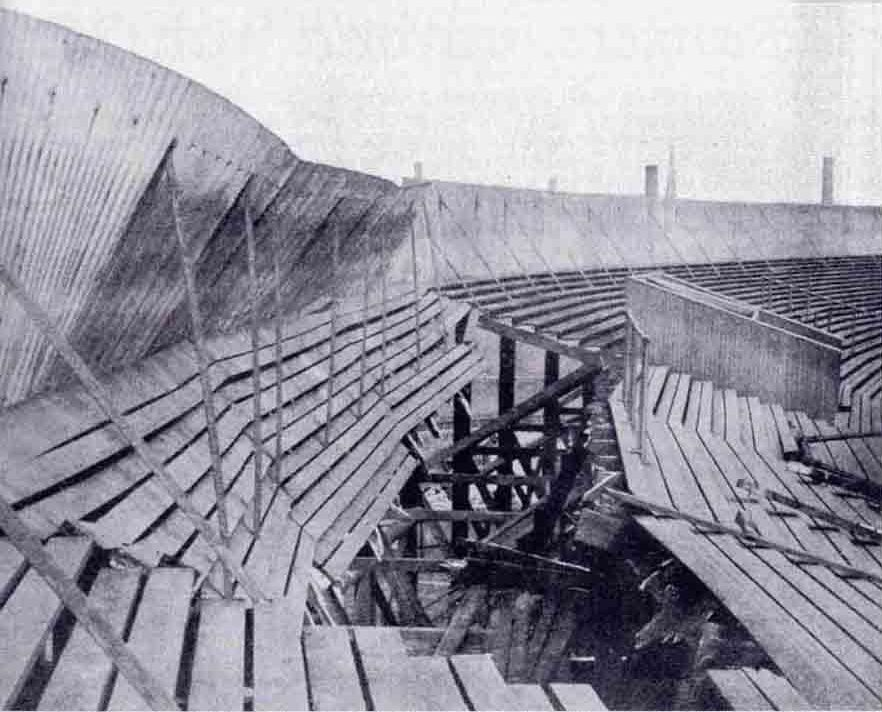
The collapsed Western Tribune Stand

The 1901–02 British Home Championship was an international football tournament between the British Home Nations which was meant to herald the arrival of the full professional game of football as both England and Scotland fielded fully professional teams for the first time. The championship was however dominated and overshadowed by a disaster during the final deciding match between England and Scotland at Ibrox Park, which claimed 25 lives. Six minutes into the game, a section of the wooden West Tribune Stand suddenly collapsed due to heavy rainfall the night before. Over 500 people were injured as the stadium was packed to its 68,000 capacity for the match. Although play was stopped in the immediate aftermath of the disaster as players, police and stewards rushed to aid the injured, it was later continued. The continued match finished 1–1 despite the players' reluctance and repeated pauses to allow police and injured spectators to cross the pitch. After the match the Scottish and English Football Associations decided to void the result, and the match was replayed at Villa Park. All proceeds from the replay were contributed to the Disaster Fund set up to aid victims of the accident.

Ireland kicked off the tournament in fine style, beating Wales 3–0 in Cardiff with a good performance. Their luck did not hold out in their second game however, thumped 5–1 by an impressive Scottish side in Greenock. Scotland continued their run of good form against Wales, with another 5–1 victory, setting them up as tournament favourites going into the final games. England had played poorly in their opening matches, drawing 0–0 with Wales and scrambling a 1–0 victory over the Irish. The final match up was marred by tragedy and the game was eventually relocated to England due to the turmoil in the Scottish football community as a result of the disaster. The match was fiercely fought and ended with a 2–2 draw, sharing the points but giving the championship to the Scots.

== Table ==
Team	Pld	W	D	L	GF	GA	GD	Pts
Scotland (C)	3	2	1	0	12	4	+8	5
England	3	1	2	0	3	2	+1	4
Ireland	3	1	0	2	4	6	−2	2
Wales	3	0	1	2	1	8	−7	1

Rules for classification: 1) points. The points system worked as follows: 2 points for a win and 1 point for a draw.
(C) Champions

== Results ==
22 February 1902

Wales	0–3	Ireland
		Gara 40', 60', 75'

Cardiff Arms Park, Cardiff
Attendance: 10,000
Referee: Arthur Kingscot (England)

1 March 1902

Ireland	1–5	Scotland
Milne 88'		RC Hamilton 43', 70', 74'; Walker 49'; Albert Buick 76'

Grosvenor Park, Belfast
Attendance: 15,000
Referee: Frederick Bye (England)

3 March 1902

Wales	0–0	England

Racecourse Ground, Wrexham
Attendance: 10,000
Referee: Tom Robertson (Scotland)

15 March 1902

Scotland	5–1	Wales
Robertson 38'; Buick 47'; Smith 50'; Walker 55'; Campbell 88'		Morgan-Owen

Cappielow Park, Greenock
Attendance: 5,284
Referee: Joseph McBride (Ireland)

22 March 1902

Ireland	0–1	England
		Settle 86'

Balmoral Showgrounds, Belfast
Attendance: 12,000
Referee: Tom Robertson (Scotland)

5 April 1902

Scotland	Result Void 1–1	England
Brown		Settle

Ibrox Park, Govan

Replay
3 May 1902

England	2–2	Scotland
Settle 65'; Wilkes 67'		Templeton 3'; Orr 28'

Villa Park, Birmingham
Attendance: 15,000
Referee: James Torrans (Ireland)

The match between Scotland and England was cancelled after being suspended at 51' (1-1) due to the 1902 Ibrox disaster. Days later the match was repeated (2-2).

== Winning squad ==
- Scotland

Name	Apps/Goals by opponent			Total	
Name	(Wales) WAL	(Ireland) IRE	(England) ENG (Note: Caps against England refer to the replayed game in Birmingham (the team was largely the same as in the 'Ibrox disaster' match, but Bob McColl and Ronald Orr were selected in place of Sandy Brown and George Livingstone).)	Apps	Goals
Alex Smith	1/3	1	3	3	3
Bobby Walker	1	1/1	1	3	1
Jock Drummond	1	1	1	3	0
Harry Rennie	1	1	1	3	0
Jackie Robertson	1	1	1	3	0
Bob Hamilton	1	1/3		2	3
Albert Buick	1/1	1/1		2	2
John Campbell	1	1		2	0
Nicol Smith		1	1	2	0
Bobby Templeton			1/1	1	1
Ronald Orr			1/1	1	1
Andy Aitken			1	1	0
Bob McColl			1	1	0
Alex Raisbeck			1	1	0
Henry Allan	1			1	0
Sandy McMahon	1			1	0
Hughie Wilson	1			1	0
George Key		1		1	0
William McCartney		1		1	0
