= 1902–03 British Home Championship =

Tournament details
- Host country: England, Ireland, Scotland and Wales
- Dates: 14 February – 4 April 1903
- Teams: 4

Final positions
- Champions: England; Scotland; Ireland (shared)

Tournament statistics
- Matches played: 6
- Goals scored: 15 (2.5 per match)
- Top scorer: (England) Vivian Woodward (4 goals)

The 1902–03 British Home Championship was an international football tournament between the British Home Nations.

Unusually, the trophy was shared by three of the Home Nations all of whom scored four points. At the time, goal difference was not used to differentiate teams. In addition to the usual favourites of England and Scotland, Ireland also took their first ever share of the championship, after scoring their first ever victory over the Scots with a 2–0 win in Glasgow and subsequently beating Wales. The tournament was played under the shadow of the previous year's finale, when a wooden stand at Ibrox Stadium had given way under the mass of supporters and 26 people had fallen to their deaths.

Ireland and England began the competition, with the English scoring four without reply to take an early lead. England extended their advantage in the second match with a 2–1 victory over Wales and seemed to be on course for the championship. Scotland began their challenge against Wales in a match they narrowly won before stumbling against Ireland in a match the Irish dominated in front of the Scottish home support. Just two years previously at the same stadium, Scotland had beaten Ireland 11–0 in what is still their record win. On the back of this result, Ireland beat Wales 2–0 ending a miserable tournament for the Welsh who had scored only one goal and failed to gain a single point. In the final match between England and Scotland, Scotland needed a win to draw level with Ireland and England whilst England needed only a draw to take the championship outright. In a tough match in Sheffield both sides played well, but Scotland eventually won 2–1 taking their share of the title.

== Table ==
Team	Pld	W	D	L	GF	GA	GD	Pts
England (C)	3	2	0	1	7	3	+4	4
Ireland (C)	3	2	0	1	4	4	0	4
Scotland (C)	3	2	0	1	3	3	0	4
Wales	3	0	0	3	1	5	−4	0

Source: RSSSF
Rules for classification: 1) points. The points system worked as follows: 2 points for a win and 1 point for a draw.
(C) Co-champions

== Results ==
14 February 1903

England	4–0	Ireland
Woodward 19', 52'; Davis 87'; Sharp 63'

Molineux Stadium, Wolverhampton
Attendance: 24,240
Referee: William Nunnerley (Wales)

2 March 1903

England	2–1	Wales
Bache 12'; Woodward 78'		Watkins 54'

Fratton Park, Portsmouth
Attendance: 5,000
Referee: Tom Robertson (Scotland)

9 March 1903

Wales	0–1	Scotland
		Speedie 25'

Cardiff Arms Park, Cardiff
Attendance: 11,000
Referee: Frederick Thomas Kirkham (England)

21 March 1903

Scotland	0–2	Ireland
		Connor 9'; Kirwan 83'

Celtic Park, Glasgow
Attendance: 17,000
Referee: Frederick Thomas Kirkham (England)

28 March 1903

Ireland	2–0	Wales
Goodall 76'; Sheridan 88'

Solitude, Belfast
Attendance: 14,000
Referee: Fred Kirkham (England)

4 April 1903

England	1–2	Scotland
Woodward 10'		Speedie 57'; Walker 59'

Bramall Lane, Sheffield
Attendance: 32,000
Referee: William Nunnerley (Wales)

== Winning squads ==
- England

Name	Apps/Goals by opponent			Total	
Name	(Wales) WAL	(Ireland) IRE	(Scotland) SCO	Apps	Goals
Vivian Woodward	1/1	1/2	1/1	3	4
Harry Davis	1	1/1	1	3	1
Harry Johnson	1	1	1	3	0
George Molyneux	1	1	1	3	0
Tom Baddeley		1	1	2	0
Bob Crompton	1		1	2	0
Albert Houlker	1		1	2	0
Joseph Bache	1/1			1	1
Jack Sharp		1/1		1	1
Tom Booth			1	1	0
Percy Humphreys			1	1	0
Arthur Capes			1	1	0
Jack Cox			1	1	0
Rex Corbett	1			1	0
Frank Forman	1			1	0
William Garraty	1			1	0
J. W. Sutcliffe	1			1	0
Harry Hadley		1		1	0
Tom Holford		1		1	0
Arthur Lockett		1		1	0
Jimmy Settle		1		1	0
Howard Spencer		1		1	0

- Ireland

Name	Apps/Goals by opponent			Total	
Name	(Wales) WAL	(Scotland) SCO	(England) ENG	Apps	Goals
Jack Kirwan	1	1/1	1	3	1
James Sheridan	1/1	1	1	3	1
Johnny Darling	1	1	1	3	0
Billy Scott	1	1	1	3	0
Archie Goodall	1/1		1	2	1
Joe Connor	1	1/1		2	1
Jimmy Maxwell	1		1	2	0
Bob Milne		1	1	2	0
Peter Boyle	1	1		2	0
Alec McCartney	1	1		2	0
Hughie Maginnis	1	1		2	0
Johnnie Mercer	1	1		2	0
James Campbell			1	1	0
Billy McCracken			1	1	0
George McMillan			1	1	0
Harold Sloan			1	1	0
Tom Shanks		1		1	0

- Scotland

Name	Apps/Goals by opponent			Total	
Name	(Wales) WAL	(Ireland) IRE	(England) ENG	Apps	Goals
Finlay Speedie	1/1	1	1/1	3	2
Bobby Walker	1	1	1/1	3	1
Alex Smith	1	1	1	3	0
Andy Aitken	1		1	2	0
Andy McCombie	1		1	2	0
Alex Raisbeck	1		1	2	0
Harry Rennie	1	1		2	0
Jackie Robertson	1		1	2	0
Bobby Templeton	1		1	2	0
Jimmy Watson	1		1	2	0
Ned Doig			1	1	0
Bob Hamilton			1	1	0
John Cross		1		1	0
Jock Drummond		1		1	0
Archie Gray		1		1	0
David Lindsay		1		1	0
Willie Orr		1		1	0
Willie Porteous		1		1	0
Peter Robertson		1		1	0
John Campbell	1			1	0
