= Glasgow International Exhibition Cup =

Association football tournament

The Glasgow Exhibition Cup was a football competition held as part of the Glasgow International Trade Fair of 1901.

Eight Scottish First Division sides (acknowledged as the leading clubs in the country) were invited to the tournament, and matches were played at a specially built site at Gilmorehill, located adjacent to the University of Glasgow and near to the Kelvingrove Art Gallery where the main part of the exhibition was being held. Played across August and early September 1901, Rangers won the competition, defeating Celtic in the final – a cup and gold medals were awarded to the winning team.

The following year the 1902 Ibrox disaster occurred, and Rangers organised a tournament with its proceeds going to benefit the victims, offering up the Exhibition Cup as a prize for the winners. Celtic won that tournament, the British League Cup (beating Rangers in the final), and kept the trophy permanently, despite its inscription stating "Awarded to Rangers F.C."

== Matches ==
=== Quarter-finals ===
Team 1	Aggregate	Team 2
Third Lanark	3–1	Morton
Rangers	8–1	St Mirren
Celtic	1–0	Hibernian
Heart of Midlothian	2–1	Queen's Park

=== Semi-finals ===
Team 1	Aggregate	Team 2
Rangers	4–1	Third Lanark
Celtic	2–1	Heart of Midlothian

=== Final ===
9 September 1901

Rangers	3–1	Celtic
Hamilton 15', 80'; Neil	Report	Campbell 9'

Exhibition Stadium, University of Glasgow, Glasgow
Attendance: 15,000
Referee: T. Robertson

==== Teams ====
Rangers:
GK	Matthew Dickie
RB	Nicol Smith
LB	Jock Drummond
RH	James Stark
CH	Bobby Neil
LH	Neilly Gibson
OR	Davy McDougall
IR	Jack Wilkie
CF	Robert Hamilton
IL	Finlay Speedie
OL	Alex Smith

Celtic:
GK	Rab Macfarlane
RB	Bob Davidson
LB	Barney Battles
RH	Jimmy Moir
CH	Henry Marshall
LH	Tommy Hynds
OR	Johnny Hodge
IR	George Livingstone
CF	Johnny Campbell
IL	Jimmy Drummond
OL	Jimmy Quinn

== See also ==
- 1888 Glasgow Exhibition Cup, similar tournament in 1888 at the same venue
- Edinburgh Exhibition Cup, similar tournament in 1908
- Empire Exhibition Trophy, similar tournament in 1938 (also featuring English clubs)
- Saint Mungo Cup, similar tournament in 1951
- Coronation Cup (football), similar tournament in 1953 (also featuring English clubs)
