= 1902–03 in Scottish football =

Football in Scotland
- Season: 1902–03

1902–03 in Scottish football

Division One champions
- Hibernian

Division Two champions
- Airdrieonians

Scottish Cup winners
- Rangers

Junior Cup winners
- Parkhead

Scotland national team
- 1903 BHC

The 1902–03 season was the 30th season of competitive football in Scotland and the 13th season of the Scottish Football League.

== League competitions ==
=== Scottish League Division One ===
Pos	Team	Pld	W	D	L	GF	GA	GD	Pts	Qualification or relegation
1	Hibernian (C)	22	16	5	1	48	18	+30	37	Champions
2	Dundee	22	13	5	4	31	12	+19	31	
3	Rangers	22	12	5	5	56	24	+32	29	
4	Heart of Midlothian	22	11	6	5	46	27	+19	28	
5	Celtic	22	8	10	4	36	30	+6	26	
6	St Mirren	22	7	8	7	39	40	−1	22	
7	Third Lanark	22	8	5	9	34	27	+7	21	
8	Partick Thistle	22	6	7	9	34	50	−16	19	
9	Kilmarnock	22	6	4	12	24	43	−19	16	
10	Queen's Park	22	5	5	12	33	48	−15	15	
11	Port Glasgow Athletic	22	3	5	14	26	49	−23	11	
12	Morton	22	2	5	15	22	55	−33	9	

Source: nozdrul.plus.com
(C) Champions

Champions: Hibernian

=== Scottish League Division Two ===
Pos	Team	Pld	W	D	L	GF	GA	GD	Pts	Promotion or relegation
1	Airdrieonians (C, P)	22	15	5	2	43	19	+24	35	Promoted to the 1903–04 Scottish Division One
2	Motherwell (P)	22	12	4	6	44	35	+9	28	Promoted to the 1903–04 Scottish Division One
3	Ayr	22	12	3	7	34	34	0	27	
3	Leith Athletic	22	11	5	6	43	42	+1	27	
5	St Bernard's	22	12	2	8	45	32	+13	26	
6	Falkirk	22	8	7	7	39	37	+2	23	
6	Hamilton Academical	22	11	1	10	45	35	+10	23	
8	East Stirlingshire	22	9	3	10	46	41	+5	21	
9	Arthurlie	22	6	8	8	34	46	−12	20	
10	Abercorn	22	5	2	15	35	58	−23	12	
11	Clyde	22	2	7	13	22	40	−18	11	
11	Raith Rovers	22	3	5	14	34	55	−21	11	

Source: statto.com
Rules for classification: Teams finish equal if level on points. Points system: 2 points for a win, 1 point for a draw, 0 points for a loss
(C) Champions; (P) Promoted

== Other honours ==
=== Cup honours ===
==== National ====
Competition	Winner	Score	Runner-up
Scottish Cup	Rangers	2 – 0 (Note: Second replay needed)	Hearts
Scottish Qualifying Cup	Motherwell	2 – 1	Stenhousemuir
Scottish Junior Cup	Parkhead	3 – 0	Larkhall Thistle

==== County ====
Competition (Note: The Dumbartonshire Cup was not held this season.)	Winner	Score	Runner-up
Aberdeenshire Cup	Victoria United	4 – 1 (Note: Replay needed.)	Aberdeen
Ayrshire Cup	Galston	2 – 0	Annbank
Border Cup	Vale of Leithen	5 – 2	Selkirk
East of Scotland Shield	Hibernian	2 – 1	Leith Ath
Fife Cup	Hearts of Beith	3 – 2	Lochgelly United
Forfarshire Cup	Dundee	2 – 1	Montrose
Glasgow Cup	Third Lanark	3 – 0	Celtic
Lanarkshire Cup	Airdrie	2 – 1	Hamilton
Linlithgowshire Cup	Broxburn	1 – 0	Bo'ness
North of Scotland Cup	Clachnacuddin	4 – 1	Inverness Citadel
Perthshire Cup	St Johnstone	3 – 2	Vale of Teith
Renfrewshire Cup	Morton	4 – 0 (Note: Play off needed.)	Abercorn
Southern Counties Cup	Dumfries	3 – 1	Douglas Wanderers
Stirlingshire Cup	East Stirling	3 – 0	Stenhousemuir

=== Non-league honours ===
Highland League

Top Three
Pos	Team	Pld	W	D	L	GF	GA	GD	Pts
1	Clachnacuddin	10	7	2	1	30	9	+21	16
2	Inverness Thistle	10	7	1	2	20	18	+2	15
3	Inverness Citadel	10	5	0	5	25	18	+7	10

Source: SFHA

Other Senior Leagues

Division	Winner
Banffshire & District League	Buckie Thistle
Border Senior League	Selkirk
Central Combination	Alloa Athletic
Northern League	Dundee 'A'
Perthshire League	Stanley
Scottish Combination	Albion Rovers

== Scotland national team ==
In the 1903 British Home Championship, Scotland shared the trophy with England and Ireland.

Date	Venue	Opponents	Score (Note: Scotland's score is shown first.)	Competition	Scotland scorer(s)
9 March 1903	Ninian Park, Cardiff (A)	Wales	1–0	BHC	Finlay Speedie
21 March 1903	Celtic Park, Glasgow (H)	Ireland	0–2	BHC	
4 April 1903	Bramall Lane, Sheffield (A)	England	2–1	BHC	Finlay Speedie, Robert Walker

Key:

- (A) = Away match
- (H) = Home match
- BHC = British Home Championship

Team	Pld	W	D	L	GF	GA	GD	Pts
England (C)	3	2	0	1	7	3	+4	4
Ireland (C)	3	2	0	1	4	4	0	4
Scotland (C)	3	2	0	1	3	3	0	4
Wales	3	0	0	3	1	5	−4	0

Source: RSSSF
Rules for classification: 1) points. The points system worked as follows: 2 points for a win and 1 point for a draw.
(C) Co-champions

== Other national teams ==
=== Scottish League XI ===
Date	Venue	Opponents	Score (Note: Scottish League XI's score is shown first.)	Scotland scorer(s)
28 February 1903	Grosvenor Park, Belfast (A)	(Northern Ireland) Irish League XI	0–1	
14 March 1903	Celtic Park, Glasgow (H)	(England) Football League XI	0–3	

== See also ==
- 1902–03 Rangers F.C. season
