= George Philip (goalkeeper) =

Scottish footballer

Personal information
- Full name: George Philip
- Date of birth: 29 July 1878
- Place of birth: Edinburgh, Scotland
- Position: Goalkeeper

Youth career
- Banefield

Senior career*
Years	Team	Apps	(Gls)
1898–1906	Heart of Midlothian	74	(0)
1901–1902	→ Cowdenbeath (loan)		
1906–1908	Portsmouth	1+	(0)
1908–1911	Dundee	6	(0)
Total		100+	(0)
- * Club domestic league appearances and goals

George Philip (born 29 July 1878) was a Scottish footballer who played as a goalkeeper for Heart of Midlothian, Portsmouth and Dundee.

Raised in the west end of Edinburgh, he was contracted to Hearts for eight years, though only played regularly in three seasons, being the most frequently used of several 'goalies' tried out during 1900–01, before being loaned out to non-league Cowdenbeath when George McWattie joined the club and acting as back-up to McWattie until 1904. He became the starting 'keeper for two years, only to lose the place after the arrival of Tom Allan. However despite this lack of consistent selection, he managed to claim two winner's medals in the Scottish Cup, in 1901 and 1906.

After his Hearts spell, it was reported in May 1906 that Philip had signed for Plymouth Argyle. In 1911 it was noted retrospectively that he had in fact been with Portsmouth making him one of several men brought to the South Coast via former Hearts player Albert Buick (and Plymouth therefore merely a confusion between the club names). He is recorded as playing at least once for Pompey in the Southern League against Swindon Town (Fred Cook played in the return fixture) but probably featured more often, as a squad summary listed him as the club's only goalkeeper for the start of the 1906–07 season.

In 1908 he returned to Scotland and joined Dundee – at Dens Park it is known that he was a reserve behind Bob Crumley, playing in only six Scottish Football League fixtures in three seasons (an outfield player of the same name also joined the club in that period).
