= McCluggage =

McCluggage is a surname. Notable people with the surname include:

- Andy McCluggage (1900–1954), Irish footballer
- Denise McCluggage (1927–2015), American racing driver
- Hugh McCluggage (born 1998), Australian rules footballer
- Kerry McCluggage (born 1954), American television executive
