= James Moir =

James Moir may refer to:

- Jim Moir (broadcasting executive), BBC executive
- James Moir (soccer) (1900–1961), Canadian soccer player
- James Moir (merchant) (1817–1899), Scottish-American merchant
- James MacArthur Moir, Scottish miller and laird
- Jimmy Moir (footballer) (1879–?), Scottish footballer
- Jim Moir, comedian also known by the stage name Vic Reeves
- Jimmy Moir (weightlifter), Scottish weightlifter
- James Moir, boxer known as Gunner Moir
