= Albert Mays =

Albert Mays may refer to:

- Al Mays (1865–1905), baseball player
- Albert Mays (footballer) (1929–1973), Welsh professional footballer and amateur cricketer
