= William Key =

William Key may refer to:

- William Key (footballer), Scottish footballer
- William S. Key, United States Army general
- William Ryan Key, American singer, songwriter, and musician
