= George McWattie =

Scottish footballer

Personal information
- Full name: George Chappell McWattie
- Date of birth: 22 April 1875
- Place of birth: Arbroath, Scotland
- Date of death: 1952 (aged 76–77)
- Place of death: Edinburgh, Scotland
- Position: Goalkeeper

Senior career*
Years	Team	Apps	(Gls)
–1898	Arbroath		
1898–1900	Hibernian	20	(0)
1900–1901	Queen's Park	18	(0)
1901–1905	Heart of Midlothian	60	(0)
Total		90	(0)

International career
1901	Scotland	2	(0)
1901–1902	Scottish League XI	2	(0)
- * Club domestic league appearances and goals

George Chappell McWattie (22 April 1875 – 1952) was a Scottish footballer who played as a goalkeeper for Arbroath, Hibernian, Queen's Park, Heart of Midlothian and Scotland. He played in the 1901–02 World Championship in which Hearts defeated Tottenham Hotspur over two legs, and in the 1903 Scottish Cup Final which Hearts lost to Rangers after two replays.
