= James Stark (footballer) =

Scottish footballer

Personal information
- Place of birth: Ruchazie, Scotland
- Position: Centre half

Youth career
- Mansewood
- Pollokshaws Eastwood

Senior career*
| Years | Team | Apps | (Gls) |
| – | Glasgow Perthshire | | |
| 1900–1907 | Rangers | 125 | (11) |
| 1907–1908 | Chelsea | 30 | (2) |
| 1908–1910 | Rangers | 41 | (1) |
| 1910–1915 | Morton | 150 | (5) |

International career
| 1907–1909 | Scottish League XI | 2 | (0) |
| 1909 | Scotland | 2 | (0) |
- * Club domestic league appearances and goals

James Stark (1880– ? ) was a Scottish footballer who played for Rangers, Chelsea, Morton and Scotland. He played at centre half.

== Career ==
Stark joined Rangers from Junior side Glasgow Perthshire in May 1900. He had seven successful years at Ibrox, winning the Scottish Football League twice (1900–01 and 1901–02) plus a Scottish Cup (1902–03) and two Glasgow Cups (1900–01, 1901–02), and was captain when they won the Glasgow International Exhibition Cup in 1901.

He moved to Chelsea in 1907, returning to Rangers a year later, but with no further major honours won in his two-season second spell there. He finished his career as a first-team regular at Morton, winning his last honour, the War Fund Shield, in one of his final appearances in 1915.

Stark also won two Scotland caps in 1909 and was captain of the side for both matches. He was selected twice by the Scottish League XI.

== See also ==
- List of Scotland national football team captains
