= Sandy Brown (footballer, born 1877) =

Scottish footballer

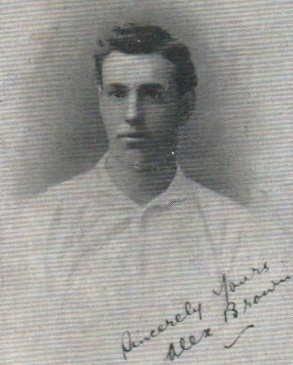

Personal information
- Full name: Alexander White Brown
- Date of birth: 21 December 1877
- Place of birth: Muirkirk, Scotland
- Date of death: 6 March 1944 (aged 66)
- Place of death: New Zealand
- Position: Forward

Youth career
- 1894–1895: Glenbuck Athletic
- 1895–1896: Kilsyth Wanderers

Senior career*
Years	Team	Apps	(Gls)
1896	St Bernard's	15	(8)
1896–1899	Preston North End		
1899–1900	Portsmouth		
1900–1902	Tottenham Hotspur	46	(28)
1902–1903	Portsmouth		
1903–1905	Middlesbrough	44	(15)
1905–1908	Luton Town	69	(33)
- Kettering Town
- Nithsdale Wanderers
- Ayr United

International career
1904	Scotland	1	(0)
- * Club domestic league appearances and goals

Alexander White Brown (21 December 1877 – 6 March 1944) was a Scottish footballer.

== Career ==
Brown was a prolific scorer in Scottish youth football, and earned his nickname as the "Glenbuck Goalgetter" as a 16-year-old playing for Glenbuck Athletic. Turning professional with St Bernard's two years later, he was soon induced across the border to English football with Preston North End. After three years, his career continued with Portsmouth, then Tottenham Hotspur.

During the 1900–01 season, Brown scored 15 goals during Tottenham's FA Cup run, including a goal in every round, which resulted in the club becoming the only non-League team to win the Cup. Brown scored both of Tottenham's goals in the first Final against Sheffield United, a 2–2 draw; in the replayed match he scored another as Spurs beat United 3–1 to win the Cup. In total, during his brief spell at Tottenham, Brown scored 64 goals in just 84 domestic games. He also played in the 1901–02 World Championship fixtures against Hearts, lining up alongside Sandy Tait who came from the same Ayrshire mining village, Glenbuck.

A spell back at Portsmouth and a time at Middlesbrough followed before Brown settled at Luton Town in 1905. After 33 goals in 69 league games, Brown left for Kettering Town before returning to Scotland with first Nithsdale Wanderers, then Ayr United.

Brown won one cap for Scotland, in a 1–0 defeat by England during the 1903–04 British Home Championship. He had been selected in 1902 against the same opposition and scored a goal, but that match in Glasgow was declared unofficial after a stand collapsed, killing dozens and injuring hundreds.

His younger brother Tommy was also a footballer and a forward, who also played for Glenbuck Athletic and Portsmouth, as well as Leicester Fosse, Chesterfield and Dundee.

== Career statistics ==
=== International ===
Appearances and goals by national team and year
National team	Year	Apps	Goals
Scotland	1904	1	0
Total		1	0

== Honours ==
Tottenham Hotspur

- FA Cup: 1900–01
