= William Key (footballer) =

Scottish footballer

Personal information
- Place of birth: Glasgow, Scotland
- Position: Right half

Senior career*
Years	Team	Apps	(Gls)
- Vale of Clyde
1906–1907	Queen's Park	31	(2)
1907–1910	St Mirren	79	(1)

International career
1907	Scotland	1	(0)
- * Club domestic league appearances and goals

William Key was a Scottish footballer who played as a right half.

== Career ==
Born in Glasgow, Key played club football for Vale of Clyde, Queen's Park and St Mirren, and made one appearance for Scotland in 1907.

== Personal life ==
His brother George was also a Scotland international.
