= Jimmy Drummond =

Scottish footballer

Personal information
- Full name: James Drummond
- Date of birth: 24 August 1881
- Place of birth: Bellshill, Scotland
- Position: Inside forward

Senior career*
Years	Team	Apps	(Gls)
1900–1901	Bellshill Athletic		
1901–1902	Celtic	4	(1)
1902–1904	Manchester City	28	(4)
1903	Partick Thistle		
Total		32	(5)
- * Club domestic league appearances and goals

James Drummond (24 August 1881 – unknown) was a Scottish footballer who played for Bellshill Athletic, Celtic, Manchester City and Partick Thistle.
