= Andrew Gara =

Irish association football player

Personal information
- Date of birth: 15 August 1878
- Place of birth: Roscommon, Ireland
- Position: Forward

Youth career
- Temple Bar Juniors

Senior career*
Years	Team	Apps	(Gls)
1895	Ashton-in-Makerfield		
- Park Lane
1897	Wigan County		
1898–1902	Preston North End	66	(27)
1902	Nottingham Forest	6	(1)
1902–03	Bristol City	18	(6)
1903	Earlestown		
1904	Ashton Town		
1906	Southport Central	15	(4)
1907	Ashton Town		
1907	Eccles Borough		
1908	Ashton Town		

International career
1902	Ireland	3	(3)
- * Club domestic league appearances and goals

Andrew Gara (born 15 August 1878 - died 1941 Ince District (Wigan) ) was an Irish footballer who played as a forward.

== Club career ==
Gara joined Wigan County on the foundation of the club in 1897, scoring against Nelson in the FA Cup in October of the same year.

After impressing in a friendly match against Preston North End Gara joined Preston for a reported fee of £100, where he averaged close to a goal every other game, top scoring in the 1900–01 season with 11 goals, despite Preston's relegation that season. Gara would then have a short spell with Nottingham Forest, making 6 appearances and scoring once on his home debut against Aston Villa.

He would then join Second division Bristol City, where he scored 6 goals in 18 games, before returning to the Lancashire Combination league with Earlestown, who would be promoted at the end of his season with the club. He would remain in the Lancashire Combination for the remainder of his playing career, with three spells at Ashton Town as well as time with Southport Central and Eccles Borough, before retiring in 1908.

== International career ==
Gara was selected for Ireland during the 1901-02 British Home Championship, scoring three goals on his debut against Wales. One of Gara's international shirts is in the collection of the National Football Museum
