= Alex Kane (footballer) =

Scottish footballer

Personal information
- Full name: Alexander Kane
- Date of birth: 17 October 1897
- Place of birth: Aberdeen, Scotland
- Position: Goalkeeper

Senior career*
Years	Team	Apps	(Gls)
1917–1918	King's Own Scottish Borderers		
1918–1919	Broxburn United		
1919–1922	Heart of Midlothian	106	(0)
1922–1923	Reading	42	(0)
1923–1926	Portsmouth	96	(0)
1926–1927	West Ham United	2	(0)
1927–1928	Congasgo (Toronto)		
1928	Bredins Bread (Toronto)		
Total		246	(0)
- * Club domestic league appearances and goals

Alexander Kane (17 October 1897 – unknown) was a Scottish footballer who played in the Football League for Portsmouth, Reading and West Ham United and in the Scottish Football League for Heart of Midlothian.
