= Robert Davidson (footballer, born 1876) =

Scottish footballer

Personal information
- Full name: Robert Davidson
- Date of birth: 1876
- Place of birth: Whitburn, West Lothian, Scotland
- Date of death: 1935 (aged 58–59)
- Position: Full back

Senior career*
Years	Team	Apps	(Gls)
1895–1896	West Benhar Violet		
1896–1897	Albion Rovers		
1897–1898	Dykehead		
1898–1902	Celtic	43	(0)
1899–1900	→ Belfast Celtic (loan)		
1900	→ Heart of Midlothian (loan)	0	(0)
1900	→ Airdrieonians (loan)	0	(0)
1902–1904	Manchester City	32	(0)
1904–1910	Airdrieonians	124	(0)
1910	Bathgate		
1911	Balimba Rangers (Queensland)		
Total		199	(0)
- * Club domestic league appearances and goals

Robert Davidson (1876–1935) was a Scottish footballer who played in the Football League for Manchester City. He earlier played for Celtic, featuring on the losing side in the 1901 Scottish Cup Final and winning the 1902 British League Cup. After his spell in England, he made well over a century of appearances for Airdrieonians and came into consideration for an international appearance, taking part in the Home Scots v Anglo-Scots trial in 1905 (his side won 2–0, but ultimately Andy McCombie and Jimmy Watson were selected as the full-back pairing).
