= Willie McFarlane =

Scottish footballer (1923–1998)

William McFarlane (1 October 1923 – October 1998) was a Scottish footballer, who played for Bathgate Thistle, Hearts, Stirling Albion, Kilmarnock and Inverness Caledonian. McFarlane represented Scotland once, in a 6–0 victory against Luxembourg in May 1947. McFarlane was born in Fallin, Stirling on 1 October 1923, and died in Stirling in October 1998, at the age of 75.
