= Mark Bell (footballer) =

Scottish footballer (1881-1961)

Personal information
- Full name: Mark Dickson Bell
- Date of birth: 8 February 1881
- Place of birth: Edinburgh, Scotland
- Date of death: 22 October 1961 (aged 80)
- Place of death: Edinburgh, Scotland
- Height: 5 ft 8 in (1.73 m)
- Position: Outside forward

Senior career*
Years	Team	Apps	(Gls)
- Rosebery Juniors
1898–1900	St Bernard's	27	(3)
1900–1902	Heart of Midlothian	18	(4)
1902–1903	Southampton	9	(6)
1903–1904	Heart of Midlothian	17	(3)
1904–1907	Fulham	58	(6)
1907–1910	Clapton Orient	88	(4)
1910–1912	Leyton		
1912–1913	Gillingham		

International career
1901	Scotland	1	(0)
- * Club domestic league appearances and goals

Mark Dickson Bell (8 February 1881 – 22 October 1961) was a Scottish footballer who played for Heart of Midlothian in the early years of the 20th century, helping them to win the Scottish Cup in 1901, before moving to England where he won Southern League championships with Southampton and Fulham. An outside forward capable of playing on the left or right wing, he won one international cap for Scotland in 1901.

== Football career ==
=== Heart of Midlothian ===
Bell was born in Edinburgh and began in junior football with Rosebery. After a spell with St Bernard's, he joined Heart of Midlothian in October 1900 alongside teammate Bob Houston. In his first season with Hearts, he was joint top scorer (with Bill Porteous) with eight goals and was a member of the team that won the Scottish Cup, defeating Division One runners-up Celtic 4–3; he scored twice in the final, including the late winner. A month before that success Bell had earned what proved to be his solitary cap for Scotland, in a 1–1 draw with Wales on 2 March 1901.

At Hearts, he was regarded as a nippy forward, equally at home on either wing. In 1901–02 he helped Hearts to third place in the Scottish League table, as well as the 1901–02 World Championship.

=== Southampton ===
In 1902, he moved to the south coast of England, where Southampton were attempting to reclaim the Southern League title, and recruited six new players, including fellow Scots, Tom Robertson from Liverpool and Jack Fraser from St Mirren.

Bell made his debut on 18 October 1902, standing in for Joe Turner, in a 1–1 draw at Kettering Town. Injury prevented him from making regular appearances, although he made six consecutive league (and three in the FA Cup) in January and February replacing the injured Dick Evans. Bell contributed six league goals, plus one in the cup, including a pair in an 11–0 victory over Watford on 13 December 1902. This remains the "Saints" joint highest victory margin in League football.

In his nine Southern League appearances, he scored six goals, helping Southampton claim the Southern League title for the fifth time in seven years.

=== Later career ===
In April 1903 he returned to Hearts, helping them to take the runners-up position in the Scottish League for the 1903–04 season.

He then returned to the Southern League with Fulham where he helped them take the championship title for the first time in 1905–06 (when Southampton were runners-up) and again the following season.

He left Fulham in 1907 and spent the rest of his career with various London clubs, including Clapton Orient and Leyton, before finishing his career with Gillingham, where he played as a halfback.

After the First World War he emigrated to Australia in 1919.

== Honours ==
Heart of Midlothian

- Scottish Cup winners: 1901

Southampton

- Southern League championship: 1902–03

Fulham

- Southern League championship: 1905–06, 1906–07
