= Bob Houston =

Scottish footballer (1877–1954)

Personal information
- Full name: Robert Houston
- Date of birth: 9 January 1877
- Place of birth: Leven, Scotland
- Date of death: 29 November 1954 (aged 77)
- Place of death: Edmonton, England
- Height: 5 ft 11 in (1.80 m)
- Position: Forward

Senior career*
Years	Team	Apps	(Gls)
–	Leven Thistle		
1897–1900	St Bernard's	24	(9)
1900–1902	Heart of Midlothian	23	(8)
1902–1903	Tottenham Hotspur	9	(3)
–	East Fife		
- * Club domestic league appearances and goals

Robert Houston (9 January 1877 – 29 November 1954) was a Scottish footballer who played as a forward for St Bernard's, Heart of Midlothian and Tottenham Hotspur.

In two seasons with Hearts (joining the club alongside St Bernard's teammate Mark Bell) he claimed winner's medals in the Scottish Cup in 1901, followed by the 1901–02 World Championship. The opposition they defeated in the cross-border challenge was the FA Cup holders Tottenham, who signed Houston a few months later; in London, he lost the battle for a regular place in the side with future English international Vivian Woodward He was a regular feature of the squad that won the London League that season. Houston returned to Scotland a year later, aged 30. After that point, no appearances were recorded for him in major competitions. He had married the daughter of Tottenham's groundsman, and later returned to act as an assistant in the role. He remained in that position till WW2.

== Honours ==
Hearts

- Scottish Cup: 1901
- World Championship: 1901–02

Tottenham Hotspur

- London League 1902–03

== Bibliography ==
- Soar, Phil (1995). Tottenham Hotspur The Official Illustrated History 1882–1995. Hamlyn. ISBN 0-600-58706-1.
- Goodwin, Bob (1992). The Spurs Alphabet. ACL & Polar Publishing (UK) Ltd. ISBN 0-9514862-8-4.
