= George Key =

Scottish footballer

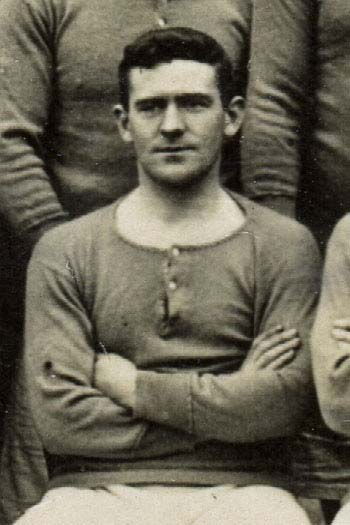

Personal information
- Full name: George Brown Key
- Date of birth: 11 February 1882
- Place of birth: Dennistoun, Glasgow, Scotland
- Date of death: November 1958
- Position: Right half

Senior career*
Years	Team	Apps	(Gls)
–1899	Parkhead		
1899–1904	Heart of Midlothian	81	(7)
1905–1909	Chelsea	54	(2)

International career
1902	Scotland	1	(0)
- * Club domestic league appearances and goals

George Brown Key (11 February 1882 – November 1958) was a Scottish international footballer who played in both the Scottish and English football leagues.

== Career ==
Key was born in the Dennistoun district of Glasgow, and played at Junior level for Parkhead before stepping up to Heart of Midlothian in 1899. With Hearts, Key won the Scottish Cup in 1901 and the following season, was capped for Scotland against Ireland, also appearing in the away leg of the 'World Championship' against Tottenham Hotspur. He was a Scottish Cup runner-up in 1903.

After a disagreement with Hearts over financial matters, Key was signed by Chelsea in 1905 for their first season in English football. The West London club's manager Jacky Robertson had been an international teammate of Key's three years earlier. Key was only a regular in his first year at Chelsea, and left in 1909.

His brother William was also a Scotland international.
