= Albert Mays (footballer) =

Welsh footballer

Personal information
- Full name: Albert Edward Mays
- Date of birth: 18 April 1929
- Place of birth: Ynyshir, Wales
- Date of death: 5 July 1973 (aged 44)
- Place of death: Derby, England
- Position: Wing half

Youth career
- 1946–1949: Derby County

Senior career*
Years	Team	Apps	(Gls)
1949–1960	Derby County	272	(21)
1960–1961	Chesterfield	37	(5)
- Burton Albion
Total		309	(26)
- * Club domestic league appearances and goals

Albert Edward Mays (18 April 1929 – 5 July 1973) was a Welsh professional footballer who played as a wing half. Mays was also an amateur cricketer.

== Football career ==
Born in Ynyshir, Mays played for Derby County, Chesterfield and Burton Albion.

== Cricket career ==
Mays played for the 2nd team of the Derbyshire County Cricket Club.
