= Andy McCluggage =

Irish footballer

Personal information
- Full name: Andrew McCluggage
- Date of birth: 1 September 1900
- Place of birth: Larne, Ireland
- Date of death: 14 October 1954 (aged 54)
- Place of death: Burnley, England
- Height: 5 ft 9 in (1.75 m)
- Position: Full back

Senior career*
Years	Team	Apps	(Gls)
	Cliftonville	?	(?)
1922–1925	Bradford Park Avenue	85	(2)
1925–1931	Burnley	204	(22)
1931–1932	Preston North End	3	(0)
	Dundalk	?	(?)
	Morecambe	?	(?)
	Larne	?	(?)

International career
1922–1931	Ireland	13	(1)
- * Club domestic league appearances and goals

Andrew McCluggage (1 September 1900 – 1954) was an Irish professional footballer who played as a full back. As well as playing for several clubs in England and Ireland, he played thirteen games for the Ireland national team, scoring once in a match against Wales on 1 February 1930.
