= Jimmy Moir (footballer) =

Scottish footballer

Personal information
- Full name: James Galbraith Moir
- Date of birth: 11 November 1879
- Place of birth: Bonhill, Scotland
- Position: Right half

Senior career*
Years	Team	Apps	(Gls)
1896–1897	Bonhill Athletic		
1897–1898	Vale of Leven		
1898–1903	Celtic	34	(0)
1899–1900	→ Vale of Leven (loan)		
1900–1901	→ Blackburn Rovers (loan)	32	(0)
1903–1906	Blackburn Rovers	45	(0)
1906	Clyde		
Total		111	(0)
- * Club domestic league appearances and goals

James Galbraith Moir (11 November 1879– unknown) was a Scottish footballer who played in the English Football League for Blackburn Rovers and in the Scottish Football League for Celtic (where his sole honour was the Glasgow Merchants Charity Cup in 1903).

He should not be confused with James Moir, another Scot who played in the same position of right half in the same period for clubs including Woolwich Arsenal.
