= Henry Allan (footballer) =

Scottish footballer (1872–1965)

Personal information
- Full name: Henry Hogg Allan
- Date of birth: 8 October 1872
- Place of birth: Kingseat, Scotland
- Date of death: 1965 (aged 92–93)
- Place of death: Vancouver, Canada
- Position: Full back

Senior career*
Years	Team	Apps	(Gls)
1893–1895	Dunfermline Athletic		
1895–1896	Cowdenbeath		
1896–1905	Heart of Midlothian	98	(0)
1903–1904	→ East Fife (loan)		

International career
1899–1900	Scottish League XI	2	(0)
1902	Scotland	1	(0)
- * Club domestic league appearances and goals

Henry Hogg Allan (8 October 1872 – 1965) was a Scottish footballer who played for Heart of Midlothian, East Fife and the Scotland national team.

Allan joined Hearts from local Fife football in April 1897 and helped the club to their third Scottish Cup success in 1901. He earned a solitary cap for Scotland in March 1902, playing in a 4–1 win over Wales. He represented the Scottish League XI on two occasions. In 1903 he became one of the founding players of East Fife. He later emigrated to Canada.
