= Thomas Allan (Scottish footballer) =

Scottish footballer

Personal information
- Full name: Thomas Allan
- Place of birth: Glasgow, Scotland
- Position: Goalkeeper

Youth career
- Wellwood Star

Senior career*
Years	Team	Apps	(Gls)
–1906	Rutherglen Glencairn		
1906–1908	Heart of Midlothian	59	(0)
1908–1910	Sunderland	25	(0)
1910–1914	Heart of Midlothian	99	(0)
1914–1916	Motherwell	39	(0)
Total		222	(0)

International career
1911	Scottish Football League XI	1	(0)
- * Club domestic league appearances and goals

Thomas Allan (born in Glasgow, Scotland) was a footballer who played in The Football League for Sunderland. He also played for Scottish Football League clubs Heart of Midlothian (two spells) and Motherwell.
