= Bobby Templeton (footballer, born 1880) =

Scottish footballer and manager

Personal information
- Full name: Robert Bryson Templeton
- Date of birth: 29 March 1880
- Place of birth: Coylton, Ayrshire, Scotland
- Date of death: 2 November 1919 (aged 39)
- Place of death: Kilmarnock, Scotland
- Position: Outside right

Senior career*
Years	Team	Apps	(Gls)
–	Kilmarnock Rugby XI		
1898–1903	Aston Villa	64	(10)
1903–1904	Newcastle United	51	(4)
1904–1906	Woolwich Arsenal	33	(1)
1906–1907	Celtic	29	(5)
1907–1913	Kilmarnock	163	(11)
1913–1915	Fulham		
1915	Kilmarnock		

International career
1902–1913	Scotland	11	(1)
1909–1910	Scottish Football League XI	3	(1)
- * Club domestic league appearances and goals

Robert Bryson Templeton (29 March 1880 – 2 November 1919) was a Scottish football player and manager. He played as an outside right for Aston Villa, Newcastle United, Woolwich Arsenal, Celtic, Kilmarnock and Fulham.

He represented Scotland eleven times between 1902 and 1913. His first international would have been on 5 April 1902, but the match was declared void after 26 spectators died during the first Ibrox disaster.
