= Charles Thomson (footballer, born 1878) =

Scottish footballer

Charlie Thomson
Personal information
- Full name: Charles Bellany Thomson
- Date of birth: 12 June 1878
- Place of birth: Prestonpans, Scotland
- Date of death: 6 February 1936 (aged 57)
- Place of death: Edinburgh, Scotland
- Positions: Centre forward; centre half

Youth career
- Prestonpans

Senior career*
Years	Team	Apps	(Gls)
1898–1908	Heart of Midlothian	179	(38)
1908–1919	Sunderland	236	(4)
Total		415	(42)

International career
1904–1908	Scottish League XI	5	(2)
1904–1914	Scotland	21	(4)
- * Club domestic league appearances and goals

Charles Bellany Thomson (12 June 1878 – 6 February 1936) was a Scottish footballer who played for Heart of Midlothian, Sunderland and the Scotland national team.

== Playing career ==
=== Heart of Midlothian ===
Thomson started his career with local side Prestonpans, from where he moved to Hearts in 1898. Initially considered a centre-forward at Tynecastle, Thomson also occasionally played centre-half, and he took on that role permanently when Albert Buick left the Edinburgh club for Portsmouth in 1903. He played in the former role in the 1901 Scottish Cup final, when he scored the third goal in Hearts' 4–3 defeat of Celtic. Two years later he was deployed in defense but could not prevent Hearts losing the 1903 Scottish Cup final to Rangers, in a second replay.

As well as the centre-half berth, Thomson inherited the club captaincy upon Buick's departure south. Within a year he was also a Scotland international, making his debut in a 1–1 draw with Ireland at Dalymount Park in Dublin. A tenacious and inspiring figure, Thomson was a "natural skipper" and during his ten-year international career 13 of his 21 caps were earned as captain. He was also renowned for his stamina, athletic physique and fitness and his penalty-taking technique. Most of his goals (including three of the four he scored for Scotland) came from the penalty spot and it was said that he missed only one penalty-kick in his career; however, modern research has shown that he missed at least six penalties for Hearts.

Thomson captained Hearts to a 1–0 victory over Third Lanark in the 1906 Scottish Cup Final, but injury prevented him from leading the side in the 1907 final that was lost to Celtic. There was some behind the scenes unrest at Tynecastle during the close-season however which resulted in him relinquishing the captaincy. His total of appearances in the league and Scottish Cup was 218, with 48 goals scored.

=== Sunderland ===
Thomson moved to Sunderland in 1908 in a joint transfer with goalkeeper Thomas Allan for £700. At the time a transfer fee limit of £350 existed in the Football League and it has been speculated that the joint fee was a means to circumvent these restrictions, with more than 50% of the fee being liable for Thomson's signature. These suggestions are supported by two facts: firstly, Thomson was at that point Scotland captain while Allan was not recognised internationally; secondly Allan returned to Hearts two seasons later for a fee much less than £350.

Thomson's time with Sunderland was no less successful than his time with Hearts. Quickly appointed club captain, he led the team through a remarkably consistent period: during his time with the club they finished no lower than eighth in the First Division. He made over 264 major appearances for Sunderland (seven goals) and helped them to the 1912–13 League title. The Black Cats narrowly missed out on a double that season when beaten 1–0 by Aston Villa in the 1913 FA Cup Final, with Thomson and the Villa centre-forward Harry Hampton both later suspended for a month for their conduct in what was a bruising occasion.

During World War I, The Haddingtonshire Advertiser reported that Thomson was "again following his trade as a baker, being presently attached to the Italian Army in that capacity."

Thomson retired from playing in 1919, at the age of 41, and became a publican back in his native Scotland.

== Honours ==
Heart of Midlothian

- Scottish Cup: 1901, 1906

Sunderland

- Football League First Division: 1912–13
- FA Cup: runner-up 1913

== See also ==
- List of Scotland national football team captains
