= Bobby Walker (footballer, born 1879) =

Scottish footballer (1879–1930)

Personal information
- Full name: Robert Walker
- Date of birth: 10 January 1879
- Place of birth: Edinburgh, Scotland
- Date of death: 28 August 1930 (aged 51)
- Place of death: Edinburgh, Scotland
- Position: Forward

Senior career*
Years	Team	Apps	(Gls)
- Dalry Primrose
1896–1919	Heart of Midlothian	327	(124)

International career
1900–1913	Scotland	29	(8)
1899–1911	Scottish Football League XI	14	(4)
- * Club domestic league appearances and goals

Robert Walker (10 January 1879 – 28 August 1930) was a Scottish professional footballer who played as a forward for Heart of Midlothian and the Scotland national team.

== Club career ==
Walker joined Hearts from Dalry Primrose in 1896, making his debut in a "trial" match vs Sunderland. He played in a few games that clinched Hearts' second League Championship in 1897. Walker was the first Hearts player to score over 100 league goals, and he scored their 1000th SFL goal. Other notable achievements are his 33 goals against Hibernian, which is the record tally in the Edinburgh Derby if local competitions are included. He scored two hat-tricks against Hearts' main rivals, the first at the age of 19 years and 9 months in a 5–1 victory at Easter Road on 28 October 1898. He repeated the feat on 18 September 1905, again at Easter Road, in a 3–0 win.

The 1901 Scottish Cup was remembered as "Walker's Final", Hearts beating Celtic 4–3. With the score poised at 3–3 The Scotsman reported: "the Edinburgh team soon showed that they were not going to relinquish the grasp of the cup which their play entitled them to, and Walker once more proved himself the grandest forward on the field. Taking the ball some thirty yards right through the opposition, he shot straight and true. M'Arthur saved, but sent the "leather" to Bell, who tipped it over to Houston. By the last named it was again sent towards the Celtic custodian who muddled his attempt to avert, and again the Hearts were one to the good." After this match Charlie Thomson dubbed him "The Best Player in Europe" and his style of football, involving brilliant footwork and sublime passing was known as "Walkerism". He also played in Hearts Scottish Cup win of 1906.

During Hearts' first overseas tour to Norway in May 1912, King Haakon of Norway attended one of the games specifically to see Walker play.

Walker became a Hearts director in 1920. He died at the age of 51 in August 1930. Huge crowds lined the funeral route and thousands stood round his graveside. His obituary in The Scotsman stated "The Hearts never had a more brilliant forward than Walker. He was amazingly clever in manipulating the ball, and it was on skill alone that he relied, for he was never favoured with physique. With the ball at his feet he could turn on his course elusively, and in such little space, that he could often put a whole defence out of position with his deft movement."

The Football Encyclopaedia from 1934, edited by Frank Johnston, referred to him simply as "Bobby Walker, the greatest natural footballer who ever played."

== International career ==
Walker was the most capped Scottish footballer for Heart of Midlothian with 29 caps until the record was broken in 2006 by Steven Pressley. He held the Scotland national team caps record at various points from 1905 to 1931.

If caps are "weighted" to measure the number of games that were possible to play in a season, he is third in the all time Scottish caps list. His Scotland career of 13 years, one month and three days places him at no. 11 in the all-time list. He shares the record of 11 Scottish caps versus England, along with Alan Morton of Queen's Park and Rangers. The record would have been 12 as he played in the Ibrox disaster match of 5 April 1902 which has subsequently been declared unofficial. In addition he won 14 Scottish Football League XI caps, which places him 7th in the all-time list.

== Personal life ==
His brother Alex Walker also played for Hearts.

He was the uncle of St Mirren and Scotland defender George Walker, whose sisters also married footballers.

Bobby Walker is buried in North Merchiston Cemetery in Edinburgh.

== Career statistics ==
=== Club ===
Appearances and goals by club, season and competition
Club	Season	League			Scottish Cup		Total	
Club	Season	Division	Apps	Goals	Apps	Goals	Apps	Goals
Heart of Midlothian	1896–97	Scottish Football League	3	2	0	0	3	2
Heart of Midlothian	1897–98	Scottish Football League	10	7	0	0	10	7
Heart of Midlothian	1898–99	Scottish Football League	18	12	1	0	19	12
Heart of Midlothian	1899–1900	Scottish Football League	16	7	6	1	22	8
Heart of Midlothian	1900–01	Scottish Football League	15	3	5	3	20	6
Heart of Midlothian	1901–02	Scottish Football League	18	4	4	1	22	5
Heart of Midlothian	1902–03	Scottish Football League	21	9	8	2	29	11
Heart of Midlothian	1903–04	Scottish Football League	25	12	1	1	26	13
Heart of Midlothian	1904–05	Scottish Football League	20	14	2	0	22	14
Heart of Midlothian	1905–06	Scottish Football League	27	17	5	4	32	21
Heart of Midlothian	1906–07	Scottish Football League	26	5	8	3	34	8
Heart of Midlothian	1907–08	Scottish Football League	22	7	3	3	25	10
Heart of Midlothian	1908–09	Scottish Football League	28	4	2	1	30	5
Heart of Midlothian	1909–10	Scottish Football League	21	4	5	1	26	5
Heart of Midlothian	1910–11	Scottish Football League	24	8	2	0	26	8
Heart of Midlothian	1911–12	Scottish Football League	22	3	6	0	28	3
Heart of Midlothian	1912–13	Scottish Football League	11	6	4	1	15	7
Heart of Midlothian	Career total		327	124	62	21	389	145

=== International ===
Scores and results list Scotland's goal tally first, score column indicates score after each Walker goal.

List of international goals scored by Bobby Walker
No.	Date	Venue	Opponent	Score	Result	Competition
1	1 March 1902	Grosvenor Park, Belfast, Ireland	Ireland	2–0	5–1	1901–02 British Home Championship
2	15 March 1902	Cappielow, Greenock, Scotland	Wales	4–0	5–1	1901–02 British Home Championship
3	4 April 1903	Bramall Lane, Sheffield, England	England	2–1	2–1	1902–03 British Home Championship
4	12 March 1904	Dens Park, Dundee, Scotland	Wales	1–0	1–1	1903–04 British Home Championship
5	18 March 1905	Celtic Park, Glasgow, Scotland	Ireland	2–0	4–0	1904–05 British Home Championship
6	16 March 1907	Celtic Park, Glasgow, Scotland	Ireland	2–0	3–0	1906–07 British Home Championship
7	1 March 1909	Racecourse Ground, Wrexham, Wales	Wales	1–3	2–3	1908–09 British Home Championship
8	16 March 1912	Windsor Park, Belfast, Ireland	Ireland	4–1	4–1	1911–12 British Home Championship

== See also ==
- List of one-club men in association football
