= Willie Porteous =

Scottish footballer

Personal information
- Full name: William Porteous
- Date of birth: 13 November 1878
- Place of birth: Wamphray, Scotland
- Date of death: 9 April 1962 (aged 83)
- Place of death: Bangour, Scotland
- Position: Forward

Senior career*
Years	Team	Apps	(Gls)
- Vale of Grange
1899	Bo'ness		
1899–1904	Heart of Midlothian	69	(31)
1904–1905	Portsmouth		
1905–1907	Falkirk	13	(4)

International career
1903	Scotland	1	(0)
- * Club domestic league appearances and goals

William Porteous (13 November 1878 - 9 April 1962) was a Scottish footballer who played as a forward.

Born in Dumfriesshire but raised in Linlithgow, he played club football for Heart of Midlothian, Portsmouth and Falkirk and was a Scottish Cup winner with Hearts in 1901 in which he scored, as well as a losing finalist in 1903 where he missed a good scoring opportunity.

Porteous made one appearance for Scotland in 1903.
