= Finlay Speedie =

Scottish footballer

Personal information
- Full name: Finlay Ballantyne Speedie
- Date of birth: 18 August 1880
- Place of birth: Dumbarton, Scotland
- Date of death: 5 February 1953 (aged 72)
- Place of death: Dumbarton, Scotland
- Position: Inside forward

Youth career
- Artizan

Senior career*
Years	Team	Apps	(Gls)
- Clydebank Juniors
- Strathclyde
1900–1906	Rangers	98	(38)
1906–1908	Newcastle United	52	(13)
1908–1909	Oldham Athletic	15	(6)
1909	Bradford Park Avenue	5	(1)
1909–1915	Dumbarton	100	(27)
1918–1920	Dumbarton	3	(0)

International career
1903	Scotland	3	(2)
1905	Scottish League XI	1	(0)

Managerial career
- Dumbarton (trainer)
- * Club domestic league appearances and goals

Finlay Ballantyne Speedie (18 August 1880 – 5 February 1953) was a Scottish footballer who played for Rangers, Newcastle United and Scotland in the 1900s. He was a versatile forward who was most at home at inside left.

== Career ==
Speedie began his career with junior clubs Clydebank and Strathclyde (playing for both in different competitions) then joined Rangers in 1900. Playing under William Wilton he won two League championships, a Scottish Cup, two Glasgow Cups, a Charity Cup and the 1901 Glasgow Exhibition Cup.

He left Rangers in 1906 after a match against Celtic was played for his benefit and joined Newcastle United, where he won the English First Division in 1906–07 in his first season. He stayed on Tyneside for another season before joining Oldham for a season and then moved to Bradford Park Avenue for a few months before eventually re-joining old club Dumbarton; he won the old Scottish Division Two title in 1911.

Speedie won three Scotland caps, scoring two goals — all in 1903.

During the First World War he served with the Argyll and Sutherland Highlanders and was awarded the Military Medal. He maintained his links with Dumbarton and coached the team in the 1930s. His brother Willie had also played for the club (as well as for Third Lanark), and his nephew Bob (son of Willie, and nephew and cousin respectively of footballers Bob Ferrier of Sheffield Wednesday and Bob Ferrier Jr. of Motherwell) was a Sons player in the late 1930s.

Speedie died on 5 February 1953, aged 72.

== Honours ==
Newcastle United

- Football League champions: 1906–07
- Sheriff of London Charity Shield: 1907
- FA Cup: Runner-up 1908
