= John Tait Robertson =

Scottish footballer and manager

John Robertson
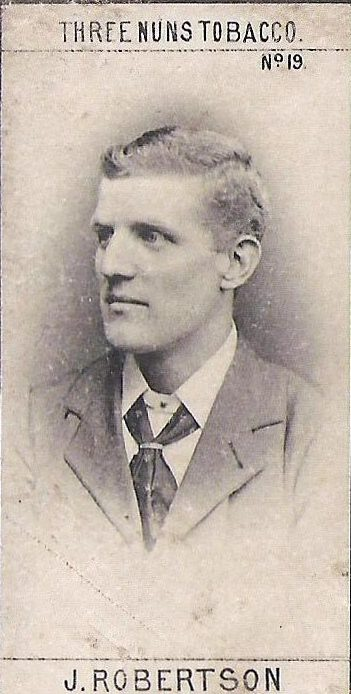

Personal information
- Full name: John Tait Robertson
- Date of birth: 25 February 1877
- Place of birth: Dumbarton, Scotland
- Date of death: 24 January 1935 (aged 57)
- Place of death: Milton, Scotland
- Height: 5 ft 8 in (1.73 m)
- Position: Half-back

Youth career
- Poinfield
- Sinclair Swifts

Senior career*
| Years | Team | Apps | (Gls) |
| 1894–1895 | Morton | 33 | (0) |
| 1895–1898 | Everton | 26 | (1) |
| 1898–1899 | Southampton | 19 | (0) |
| 1899–1905 | Rangers | 101 | (16) |
| 1905–1906 | Chelsea | 36 | (7) |
| 1907–1909 | Glossop | 45 | (10) |

International career
| 1898–1905 | Scotland | 16 | (3) |
| 1900–1905 | Scottish Football League XI | 6 | (1) |

Managerial career
- 1905–1906: Chelsea
- 1907–1909: Glossop
- 1911–1913: MTK Budapest
- * Club domestic league appearances and goals

John Tait Robertson (25 February 1877 – 24 January 1935) was a Scottish football player and manager who played mainly as a left half. He won 16 caps for his country, scoring three goals.

Having started his career at Morton, Robertson moved to Everton of the English Football League in 1895, and then Southampton in 1898, with whom he won the Southern Football League in his only season. He then returned to his homeland with Rangers, where he won three consecutive league titles in his first three seasons. Robertson was the first player signed to Chelsea in 1905, and served as their player-manager in their first-ever season, in addition to scoring their first competitive goal. He finished his career in the same role at Glossop North End.

== Career ==
=== Early career ===
Robertson began his career at Morton, and moved to Everton in 1895. He spent his first two seasons at Everton in the combination team, and made his first team debut in September 1897, against Wolves. Robertson then spent a single season at Southampton in 1898–99, winning the Southern League.

=== Rangers ===
Following his success in Southampton, he returned to Scotland and won three consecutive Scottish Football League championships at Rangers in his first three seasons, plus a Scottish Cup in the fourth; his last of 178 appearances for the club in all competitions was a play-off for the 1904–05 Scottish Division One title, when he scored but Rangers still lost to Celtic.

=== Chelsea ===
On 23 March 1905, Robertson was the first player to be signed by the newly formed Chelsea Football Club for the role of manager, but continued to play as well (he was 28 years old at the time). It was Robertson who scored Chelsea's first competitive goal, in a 1–0 win at Blackpool on 9 September 1905. In his first season, he led the club to a third-place finish in the Second Division, narrowly missing out on promotion after a dramatic late season collapse in which the side failed to win any of its last five league matches. A virtual ever-present that season, Robertson played 35 matches and scored 7 goals. In Robertson's second season at the club, he signed future club legend George Hilsdon on a free transfer, who scored five goals in the opening match of the season, defeating Glossop North End in a 9–2 win.

Robertson then surprisingly resigned from the club (third in the table at the time) on 27 November 1906. Chelsea were promoted to the top flight at the end of that season under caretaker secretary-manager William Lewis. Soon afterwards Robertson became player-manager of Glossop, where he remained until summer 1909, when he became reserve-team manager at Manchester United.

=== MTK Budapest ===
With the sponsorship of Alfréd Brüll and a London fabric company, Robertson arrived in Hungary to coach MTK Budapest in 1911, where he remained for two years before returning to Britain in 1913. During his two years stint, he won the Hungarian Cup in the 1911–12 season, as well as finishing runners-up twice in the league, both times behind Ferencvárosi TC.

Robertson was considered to be one of the coaches responsible for the development of football in Hungary between the 1910s and 20s, by introducing physical preparations and technical innovations to the Hungarian game.

== International career ==
Robertson made his debut for Scotland on 2 April 1898 while at Everton, in a 3–1 home defeat to England in the Home Nations Championship. His second cap came on 8 April of the following year, while at Southampton. All of his 14 remaining caps came during his spell at Rangers.

He captained the Scots in his fourth match, as they beat England 4–1 at home on 7 April 1900. His first goal came in his sixth match, on 2 March 1901, in a 1–1 draw with Wales, again as captain. Robertson was Scotland's captain in five matches, and scored two more goals, both against Wales. The last was in his last international on 6 March 1905, in a 3–1 away defeat in Wrexham.

== Death ==
He died at the Royal Cancer Hospital, Milton in January 1935.

== Honours ==
=== Player ===
Southampton

- Southern League championship: 1898–99

Rangers

- Scottish First Division: 1899–1900, 1900–01, 1901–02
- Scottish Cup: 1903
  - Runner-up: 1904, 1905

=== Manager ===
MTK Budapest

- Magyar Kupa: 1911–12

== See also ==
- List of Scotland national football team captains
