= George Hogg (footballer) =

Scottish footballer

Personal information
- Date of birth: 2 December 1869
- Place of birth: West Calder, Scotland
- Place of death: South Africa
- Position: Half-back

Senior career*
| Years | Team | Apps | (Gls) |
- West Calder
- Mossend Swifts
| 1892–1903 | Hearts | 131 | (7) |

International career
| 1896 | Scotland | 2 | (0) |
| 1896 | Scottish League XI | 1 | (0) |
- * Club domestic league appearances and goals

George Hogg (born 2 December 1869) was a Scottish footballer who spent most of his career with Heart of Midlothian.

Hogg began his career with home-town juvenile side West Calder before moving to nearby junior side Mossend Swifts. He moved to League side Hearts in 1892 and became a professional the following year, when professionalism was legalised in Scotland. During his time with the Gorgie side, he won two League titles, in 1894-95 and 1896-97, and two Scottish Cup winners medals, in 1895-96 and 1900-01.

Although primarily a defensive player, earning the sobriquet "Tynecastle Warhorse" as a testament to his power and stamina, he was also capable of playing a more refined game when required. He played twice for the Scotland national team, both times in 1896. He made his debut in a 2–1 win against England and also played in a 3–3 draw with Ireland. He made one appearance for the Scottish League representative side.

Hogg retired after suffering a serious knee injury during the 1903-04 season. He later emigrated to South Africa where he spent the rest of his life.
