= 1902 Ibrox disaster =

Stadium structural failure in Glasgow, Scotland

Ibrox Disaster, 1902
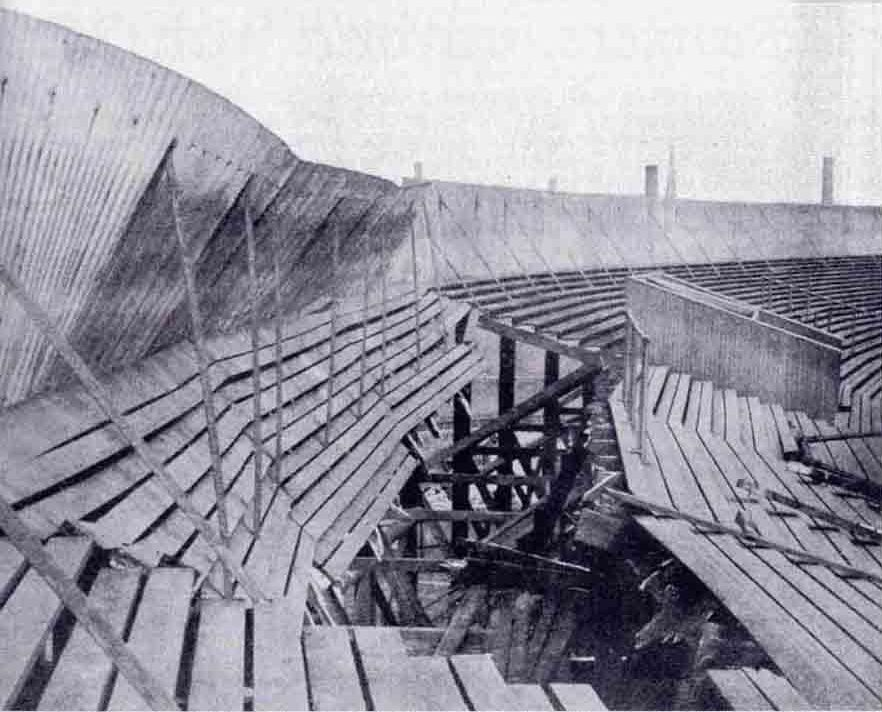
- The collapsed Western Tribune Stand
- Date: 5 April 1902
- Time: Between 15:30 and 16:00
- Location: Ibrox Park, Govan, Scotland; 55.8534°N 4.3103°W
- Deaths: 25
- Injuries: 500+

The 1902 Ibrox disaster was the collapse of a stand at Ibrox Park (now Ibrox Stadium) in Govan (now part of Glasgow), Scotland. The collapse caused the deaths of 25 supporters, and injuries to 500 more during an international association football match between Scotland and England on 5 April 1902 as part of the 1901–02 British Home Championship.

Ibrox Park had completed construction less than three years before the incident and was hosting its first international fixture, with the crowd estimated to be over 68,000. The match was the first time that the ground had been used at more than half capacity since its opening. Scotland entered the game needing only to avoid defeat to win the British Home Championship title. During the first half of the match, a section of the newly built West Tribune Stand collapsed, dropping between 200 and 300 people to the concrete floor below. Two spectators were declared dead at the scene, and a further twenty-three died of injuries sustained in the incident soon after, the last victim dying three weeks later.

Despite the collapse, the match was eventually resumed after a break as officials feared emptying crowds could interfere with rescue attempts and lead to further panic. The teams resumed the match, which ended in a 1–1 draw, although both the Scottish Football Association and the Football Association later agreed that the result should be voided. A replay was hastily organised and played a month later at Villa Park in Birmingham with all proceeds from the match being donated to a relief fund for victims of the disaster. The disaster led to an overhaul in stadium design, with wooden terraced stands being largely replaced by earth or concrete embankments.

== Background ==
Founded in 1872, Rangers had played at various local grounds in the Glasgow area and had eventually settled at Kinning Park. However, the ground's capacity, originally 2,000 but later expanded to 7,000, was struggling to meet demand for the club's fixtures, and the venue's landlords eventually looked to move Rangers on to develop the site. To combat this, the club built the first Ibrox Park to the south of the burgh of Govan in 1887, and the new ground remained in use for twelve years. The construction of Celtic Park by their Old Firm rivals Celtic in 1892 led Rangers to seek an improved venue to compete for the chance to host Scottish Cup finals or Scotland international matches, which could generate considerable income for the hosts, particularly fixtures against England. Such was the fervour surrounding these international fixtures, The Times noted that the "attendance is limited only by the size of the ground". The original Ibrox Park had hosted an England–Scotland match in 1892, but the subsequent four fixtures between 1894 and 1900 had been awarded to Celtic Park. Rangers' directors sanctioned the £20,000 construction of a new Ibrox Park in an attempt to improve the facilities.

The new stadium was built partially overlapping the previous site and was officially opened on 30 December 1899 when Rangers defeated Heart of Midlothian 3–1. Soon after opening, the ground reached a capacity of 75,000. The construction was soon recognised by the Scottish Football Association (SFA) when the new stadium was selected to host the 1902 England–Scotland match by a single vote. The match was the 31st meeting between the two sides and was the first to be contested by fully professional teams.

=== West Tribune Stand ===
The West Tribune Stand was designed by Scottish architect Archibald Leitch, a boyhood Rangers fan who offered his services free of charge, and had a capacity of 35,913. However, Leitch had expressed concerns over the maximum capacity and visited the site prior to the match to inspect the stand, but a surveyor passed the ground fit for purpose. There had previously been reports of significant swaying in the structure. The stand had been built using a steel framework which featured vertical beams set in concrete at the foundations. Horizontal beams were then interlocked with wooden decking used to form a step-like construction for spectators to stand on. There were 96 steps in total, each measuring four inches in height and around fourteen inches wide. It was estimated that at full capacity, each spectator had on average a personal space measuring sixteen inches long and fourteen inches wide.

== Events ==
=== Pre-match ===
The 1901–02 British Home Championship began in February 1902 with Ireland defeating Wales. Scotland played their first match of the competition on 1 March, defeating Ireland 5–1 in Belfast, while reigning holders England were held to a goalless draw in their first fixture two days later against Wales. Scotland and England both won their second matches; the Scots defeated Wales 5–1 while England beat Ireland 1–0 a week later. With only one match to be played Scotland led the group by a single point, needing only to avoid defeat against England at Ibrox to win their second title in three seasons.

=== Match and stand collapse ===
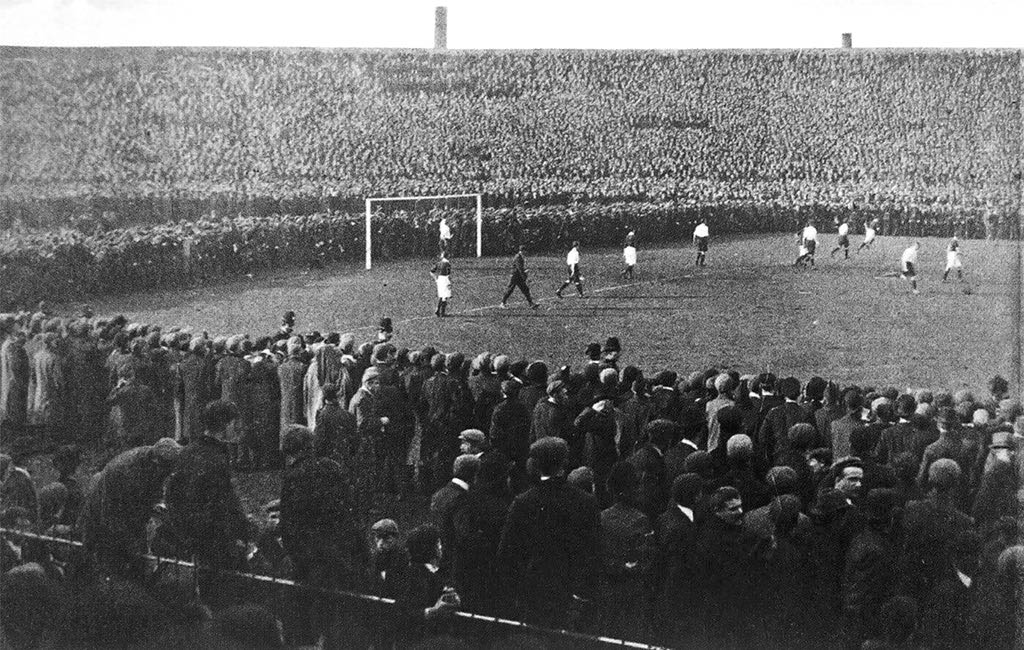
A moment of the match

On 5 April 1902, the final match of the season's British Home Championship between Scotland and England kicked off at 3:30pm. There was no official count of the attendance, but estimated figures for the match state there was a crowd of more than 68,000 in attendance, half of whom were standing in the West Tribune Stand. There were around 50 stewards on duty for the match, most of whom were experienced in their role and had been provided by the SFA. Although they had no way of determining when the stand was full, they had been given signs declaring the stand full that were displayed at an appropriate time. The stand had never previously held as many supporters, never being more than half full in previous uses. Early in the match, supporters briefly surged toward the front of the terracing, and the on-duty police were forced to intervene in order to regulate the crowd and disperse them from one area.

Newspaper reports and later studies place the incident occurring around 30 minutes into the first half of the match, when the back of the newly built West Tribune Stand collapsed, sending hundreds of supporters up to 40 feet (12 metres) to the ground below. Several factors have been reasoned for the collapse, including heavy rainfall the previous night and the large crowd stamping and swaying as the match progressed. One theory in a report following the event centred around Scottish player Bobby Templeton. Regarded as an exciting attacking player, Templeton was making his debut for the Scotland national team and had gained possession of the ball moments prior to the collapse. The investigation stated that the crowd's desperation to see Templeton dribble with the ball caused them to surge forward, which may have contributed to the collapse. It was also noted that the bottom ten rows of the stand had been left vacant as people had filled the racing track surrounding the pitch. This blocked the view from these rows and resulted in the spectators on the lower rows to continually press upwards to avoid being pushed into the empty rows below them and lose their vantage points.

An investigation of the scene afterwards found that seventeen joints had given way, causing a hole approximately 20 yards (18 metres) long to open up in the stand. Several witnesses in the crowd reported hearing loud cracking noises prior to the collapse, and one witness, who worked as a joiner, claimed to have seen the wooden boards split prior to the collapse.

=== Response ===
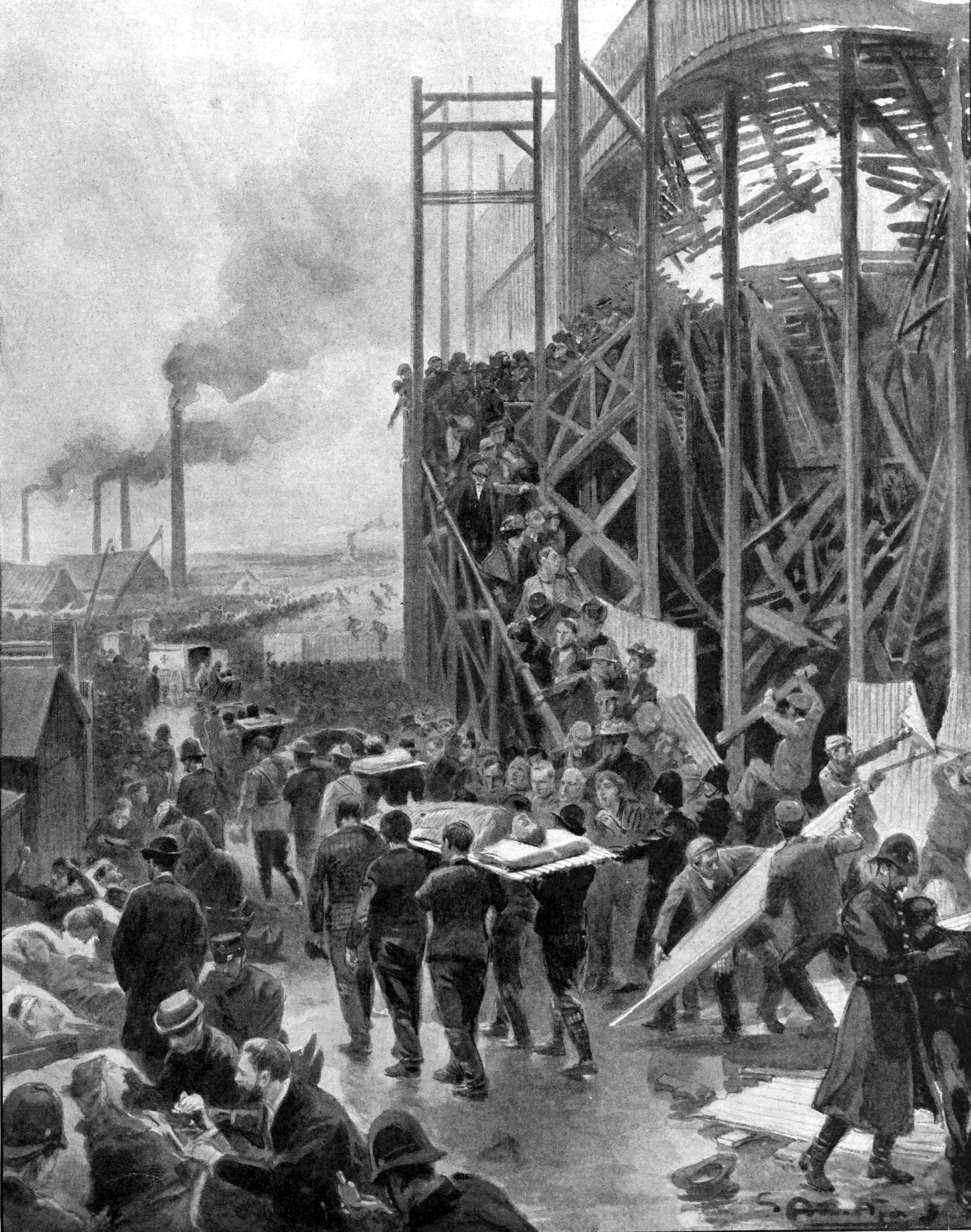
Illustration of the disaster by Italian artist Gennaro d'Amato in The Illustrated London News no. 3286

Immediately following the collapse, the crowd around the hole fled onto the playing field in an attempt to escape the stand. Scottish player Alex Raisbeck later stated that the players were unaware of the incident and initially believed that the surging crowd was a pitch invasion as supporters scrambled over the railings surrounding the field. He would later describe the scene, stating "When we saw the ambulance men at work we knew that something serious had happened. We were told to retire to the dressing-rooms. I shall never forget the scenes inside. Dead bodies and groaning men were lying on the seats where only a short time ago the Scottish players had stripped. Even some of the players’ clothing was requisitioned for bandages."

Officials estimated that between 200 and 300 spectators fell through the hole to the ground below. The majority of fatal injuries that occurred were directly caused by people impacting with either the ground or the steel girders as they fell. The mass of people eventually became heaped on the ground, with historians from the Western Infirmary in Glasgow, where the deceased were taken, commenting "Those who first reached the ground alive must then have been at hazard from suffocation" due to the volume of people. The first people to reach the incident had to rip down a galvanised iron fence around the base of the stand to gain access to the injured and The Herald wrote that rescuers first on the scene were met by "a scene of indescribable horror and confusion ... a mass of mangled and bleeding humanity, the victims piled one above the other." Some spectators had become entangled in the steel beams during their fall and were suspended in the air until they could be rescued. Local hospitals were overwhelmed with casualties, with around 190 people estimated to have been admitted following the incident, and the cells of the nearby Govan police station were used as emergency treatment rooms, with the injured being taken by requisitioned brakes or taxis carrying up to 30 people at a time. Newspaper reporters visiting the scene in the following days remarked on the lack of debris at the site as vast amounts of the shattered metal and wood had been used to form makeshift stretchers to carry injured spectators.

Despite the chaos, match officials feared that abandoning the match would lead to further injury if supporters began exiting the stadium en masse and could hinder the rescue attempts. Representatives of the SFA and the Football Association hastily discussed how to proceed and instead chose to resume the match after a twenty-minute delay. Although some players and officials disagreed with the decision, the match resumed, with Raisbeck, who supported the continuation, commenting "none of the players were sorry when the final whistle went as they were all heartily sick." Spectators and officials surrounded the field during the remainder of the match as the injured were attended to, so much so that they often interfered with the run of play as they spilled onto the pitch. The Scotsman noted how, on one occasion, mounted police officers had to be asked to move in order for a free kick to be taken. Scottish goalkeeper Ned Doig was reported to have wept consistently throughout the second half of the match. A significant number of spectators were unaware of the severity of the incident and, despite the gates being thrown open upon the incident in fear of a crush developing, few chose to leave the ground. The fixture ended in a 1–1 draw.

=== Casualties ===
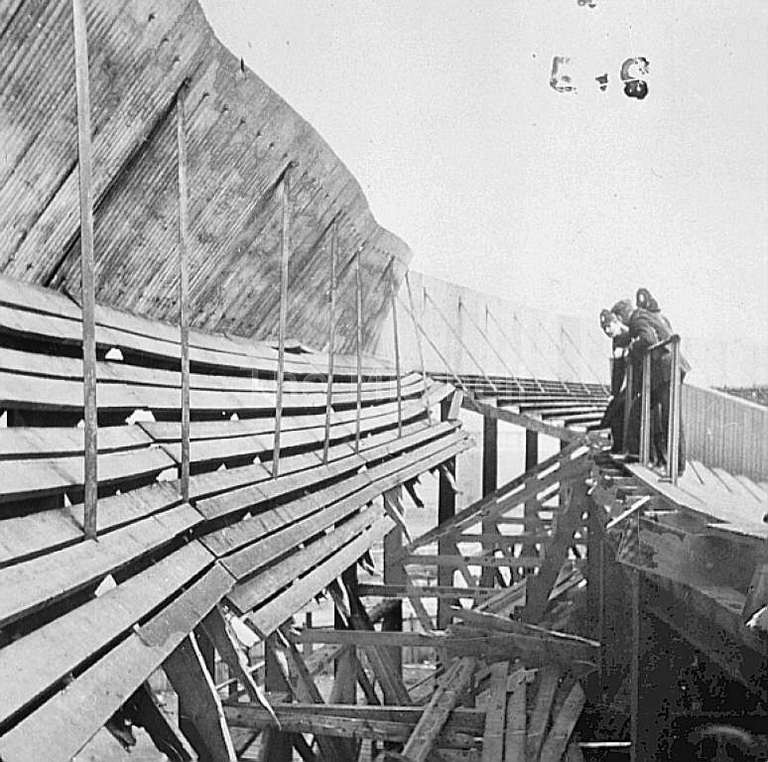
A photo of authorities inspecting the disaster area

In total, 25 people died and over 500 were reported as injured, (Note: Some reports list 26 deaths, however the indictment for the only attempt at prosecution ever brought over the disaster, against Alexander McDougall, names 25 victims.) ranging between "dangerously" and "slightly". The most common cause of death was listed as a fracture at the base of the skull, with fourteen of the victims being recorded under this category. Two of the fourteen, Alexander Murray and Bruce Crawford, were listed as "instantaneous" and were the only two victims to be pronounced dead at Ibrox Park itself. By the end of the day, a total of eight people had been confirmed dead. Eight victims were listed with causes of death pertaining to crush injuries sustained by the large mass of bodies, such as severe internal chest injuries and broken ribs. The remaining three deaths were attributed to either shock or cardiac arrest. The final victim, Peter Patterson, died five weeks after the disaster on 15 May.

Two weeks after the disaster, The Scotsman issued a list of injuries that read "dangerously injured 24, seriously injured 168, injured 153, slightly injured 171" totalling 517 injuries in total. Other reports put the injured as high as 588. A large number of injuries were described as cuts and gashes to the heads of spectators, believed to have been caused by the jagged edging of the wooden decking left by the collapse. William Dewar from Kirkcaldy was also seriously injured in the disaster and the Dundee Evening Telegraph reported that he never recovered from his injuries before dying suddenly in July 1904. Another spectator, Donald Smith, died in July 1905 which was also attributed to injuries sustained in the disaster.

== Aftermath ==
The disaster was considered the first major incident of its kind, with the Athletic News writing "the one solacing reflection is that this is the only case of fatality of this kind in connection with (the) sport". It remained the deadliest stadium disaster in Britain until the Burnden Park disaster in Bolton in March 1946. No charges were brought against Rangers or the SFA over the incident. A criminal investigation into the disaster did bring charges against timber merchant Alexander McDougall, who was charged with culpable homicide in June of the same year. McDougall had supplied the wood used in the construction of the stand and was accused of attempting to cut corners by using yellow pine instead of the higher-quality red pine. Noted civil engineers Sir Benjamin Baker and Sir William Arrol appeared as witnesses in McDougall's defence. Both testified that they believed the selection of yellow pine had played no part in the disaster and instead blamed the accident on the construction of the stand. The design was deemed too light for the work for which it was built, having been based on out-of-date textbooks. Baker concluded that the stand's design made it safe for a load of 25 lb per square foot (122 kg/m^{2}) but estimated that on the day of the match it had experienced loads of up to 75 lb per square foot (366 kg/m^{2}). McDougall was later unanimously acquitted of the charge.

Leitch himself was distraught over the incident and begged Rangers for a chance to fix the mistakes made, stating "I need hardly say what unutterable anguish the accident caused me." He was re-employed by the club to oversee the redevelopment of Ibrox and went on to design numerous football stadiums in Britain. Following the accident, the use of wooden frameworks on steel frames for football grounds was largely discredited, and replaced throughout the United Kingdom by terracing supported by earthworks or reinforced concrete.

Rangers had won four consecutive Scottish league championships prior to the disaster, but following the accident the club sold several of their best players to raise funds for a major redevelopment of Ibrox. Rangers did not win another league championship until 1911.

=== Benefit fund and matches ===
On 19 April 1902, a meeting of the FA Council declared that the match would be officially listed as "unfinished". During the meeting, it was also agreed for a relief fund to be created for victims and their families, with the FA donating £500 themselves, and a replay match organised, with all proceeds being donated to the fund. The SFA later agreed on all counts. The replay was held four weeks later at Villa Park in Birmingham on 3 May 1902 and ended in a 2–2 draw, with the majority of the players remaining unchanged from the original match, Scotland making three changes. The result secured the British Home Championship title for Scotland.

Several events were arranged to raise funds: Rangers' Old Firm rivals Celtic quickly organised a match against English side Blackburn Rovers on 16 April, the British League Cup – a one-off tournament between the leading clubs – was played in May, a multi-date domestic benefit tournament took place at the start of the following season and an additional 'benefit international' against Ireland was played on 9 August in Belfast (Scotland won 3–0).

An Ibrox Park disaster fund was established in aid of the victims and ran for nearly two years before being disbanded. During its operation, the fund paid out nearly £18,000 to injured spectators and more than £5,000 to the families of the deceased. The remaining funds, totaling around £5,500, were used to pay administrative costs before being donated to the infirmaries which had treated the injured spectators.

=== Ibrox redevelopment and later incidents ===
Ibrox underwent substantial redevelopments following the disaster. By the end of 1902, the West Tribune Stand had been significantly lowered in height to match the other stands. The number of beams in the stand was trebled which was designed to make it impossible for a spectator to fall through, even if the boards should give way. Matches also resumed the same year but with limited capacity in all stands.

During 1963, concerns were raised about the safety of the stairway adjacent to passageway 13 (colloquially known as Stairway 13), the exit closest to Copland Road subway station. On 16 September 1961 two people were killed in a crush on the stairway, and there were two other incidents, in 1967 and 1969, where several people were injured. Rangers had by then spent a total of £150,000 on improvements. Despite this, another larger disaster occurred at Ibrox in 1971, when 66 people were killed in a crush as supporters tried to leave the stadium at an Old Firm match.

== See also ==
- 1971 Ibrox disaster
- England national football team results (unofficial matches)
- England–Scotland football rivalry
- List of disasters of the United Kingdom and preceding states
- List of structural failures and collapses
- Scotland national football team results (unofficial matches)
