= Albert Buick =

Scottish footballer

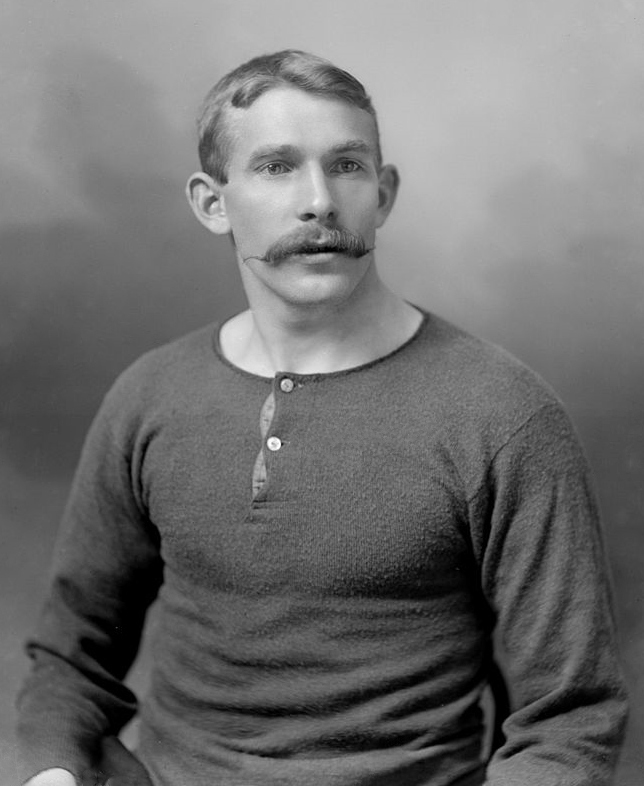

Personal information
- Full name: Albert Thoroughgood Buick
- Date of birth: 17 January 1875
- Place of birth: Arbroath, Scotland
- Date of death: 25 March 1948 (aged 73)
- Place of death: Arbroath, Scotland
- Height: 5 ft 7 in (1.70 m)
- Position: Centre-half

Senior career*
Years	Team	Apps	(Gls)
1893–1896	Arbroath		
1896–1903	Hearts	100	(7)
1903–1911	Portsmouth		

International career
1899–1903	Scottish League XI	2	(0)
1902	Scotland	2	(2)
- * Club domestic league appearances and goals

Albert Thoroughgood Buick (17 January 1875 – 25 March 1948) was a Scottish footballer, who played for Arbroath, Heart of Midlothian and Portsmouth.

Born in Arbroath, Buick started his career with home-town Arbroath F.C., where he stayed until 1896. In July of that year he joined Hearts, answering an advertisement from the then reigning Scottish Cup holders. He appeared infrequently as Hearts won the 1896-97 League title but became a more regular player the following season. He played in Hearts 1900-01 Scottish Cup win, where the Edinburgh side defeated Celtic 4-3 in the final and was club captain by the time the side reached the 1902-03 final, where they lost to Rangers.

Buick's appearance led many commentators to consider him an unlikely defender. He measured only 5 foot 7 inches tall, had a slight stoop and his long, gangly arms earned him the nickname "spider". However, his all-action style and stamina earned him many admirers and two caps for the Scotland national team in March 1902. These came against Ireland and Wales and Buick scored in both games as Scotland won 5-1 on each occasion. The stature of his contemporary and rival for the centre-half position, Alex Raisbeck, was said to have ensured he didn't win more honours.

Buick moved south to Southern Football League side Portsmouth in 1903 and was eventually joined by six former Hearts teammates. He spent eight season with Pompey, most notably helping the team to an upset victory over Manchester United in a 1906-07 FA Cup replay.

== See also ==
- List of Scotland national football team captains
