= Wales national football team results (1920–1939) =

The Wales national football team represents Wales in international association football and is governed by the Football Association of Wales (FAW). Between 1920 and 1939 the side played 62 matches, the majority against the other national teams of the Home Nations in the British Home Championship. The side played their first official match after the end of World War I in February 1920 on the resumption of the Home Championship, drawing 2–2 with Ireland. A draw with Scotland and a win over England, their first since 1882, in the 1919–20 tournament secured the second Home Championship in Wales' history. They won a third title in the 1923–24 British Home Championship after defeating all three opponents in the same competition for the first time.

Wales won the Home Championship again in the 1927–28 tournament but, as Football League sides became increasingly reluctant to release Welsh players for international competition, results dropped as the decade drew to a close. This culminated in the 1929–30 British Home Championship where Wales lost all three matches, conceding 17 goals whilst scoring just 2. When the Football League added further restrictions on releasing players ahead of the following tournament to avoid fixture clashes, Wales were forced to call-up a mixture of non-league and lower division players which led to the side being dubbed by media outlets as "Keenor and the ten unknowns", in reference to team captain Fred Keenor and the relative obscurity of his teammates. The side secured a draw with Scotland but suffered a 4–0 defeat to England before being replaced by the returning first team players.

When Wales relented on hosting fixtures alongside those of the Football League, they were able to call upon their first team more frequently. This coincided with one of the most successful periods in the team's history as they won four Home Championships between 1933 and 1939, led by the goals of Dai Astley, Pat Glover and Bryn Jones. The 1938–39 British Home Championship was the final hosting of the tournament before World War II. During this period, Wales also played their first match against an opponent other than the Home Nations when they drew with France in May 1933 in Paris. The two sides also met for a second time in May 1939 in Wales' final match before the start of the war.

Of the 62 matches Wales played during this period, they recorded 21 victories: 8 against Ireland, 7 against England and 6 against Scotland. In the remaining 40 matches, Wales drew 15 and lost 25.

== Results ==
Wales' score is shown first in each case. The colours listed below are also used to signify results combined with the scoreline.

Key
Colour (with score)	Meaning
	Defeat
	Draw
	Win

Wales national football team results 1920–1939 (Note: Table information sourced from the references listed in the statistics section below.)
Match no.	Date	Venue	H/A	Opponents	Score	Competition	Wales scorers	Att. (Note: Due to the unavailability of exact figures, some attendance numbers are given as recorded estimates.)
109	14 February 1920	The Oval, Belfast	A	Ireland	2–2	1919–20 British Home Championship	Stan Davies (2)	30,000
110	26 February 1920	Ninian Park, Cardiff	H	Scotland	1–1	1919–20 British Home Championship	Jack Evans	16,000
111	15 March 1920	Highbury, London	A	England	2–1	1919–20 British Home Championship	Stan Davies, Dick Richards	21,180
112	12 February 1921	Pittodrie, Aberdeen	A	Scotland	1–2	1920–21 British Home Championship	Dai Collier	20,824
113	14 March 1921	Ninian Park, Cardiff	H	England	0–0	1920–21 British Home Championship		12,000
114	9 April 1921	Vetch Field, Swansea	H	Ireland	2–1	1920–21 British Home Championship	Billy Hole, Stan Davies	12,000
115	4 February 1922	Racecourse Ground, Wrexham	H	Scotland	2–1	1921–22 British Home Championship	Len Davies, Stan Davies	7,000
116	13 March 1922	Anfield, Liverpool	A	England	0–1	1921–22 British Home Championship		35,000
117	1 April 1922	Windsor Park, Belfast	A	Ireland	1–1	1921–22 British Home Championship	Len Davies	20,000
118	5 March 1923	Ninian Park, Cardiff	H	England	2–2	1922–23 British Home Championship	Fred Keenor, Ivor Jones	12,000
119	17 March 1923	Love Street, Paisley	A	Scotland	0–2	1922–23 British Home Championship		25,000
120	14 April 1923	Racecourse Ground, Wrexham	H	Ireland	0–3	1922–23 British Home Championship		12,222
121	16 February 1924	Ninian Park, Cardiff	H	Scotland	2–0	1923–24 British Home Championship	Willie Davies, Len Davies	26,000
122	3 March 1924	Ewood Park, Blackburn	A	England	2–1	1923–24 British Home Championship	Willie Davies, Ted Vizard	30,000
123	15 March 1924	Windsor Park, Belfast	A	Ireland	1–0	1923–24 British Home Championship	Moses Russell	40,000
124	14 February 1925	Tynecastle Stadium, Edinburgh	A	Scotland	1–3	1924–25 British Home Championship	Billy Williams	23,000
125	28 February 1925	Vetch Field, Swansea	H	England	1–2	1924–25 British Home Championship	Fred Keenor	8,000
126	18 April 1925	Racecourse Ground, Wrexham	H	Ireland	0–0	1924–25 British Home Championship		10,000
127	31 October 1925	Ninian Park, Cardiff	H	Scotland	0–3	1925–26 British Home Championship		25,000
128	13 February 1926	Windsor Park, Belfast	A	Ireland	0–3	1925–26 British Home Championship		25,000
129	1 March 1926	Selhurst Park, London	A	England	1–3	1925–26 British Home Championship	Billy Walker	23,000
130	30 October 1926	Ibrox Park, Glasgow	A	Scotland	0–3	1926–27 British Home Championship		25,000
131	12 February 1927	Racecourse Ground, Wrexham	H	England	3–3	1926–27 British Home Championship	Len Davies (2), Wilf Lewis	16,000
132	9 April 1927	Ninian Park, Cardiff	H	Ireland	2–2	1926–27 British Home Championship	Rees Williams (2)	10,000
133	29 October 1927	Racecourse Ground, Wrexham	H	Scotland	2–2	1927–28 British Home Championship	Ernie Curtis, Jimmy Gibson	16,000
134	28 November 1927	Turf Moor, Burnley	A	England	2–1	1927–28 British Home Championship	Wilf Lewis, Jack Hill (og)	25,000
135	4 February 1928	Windsor Park, Belfast	A	Ireland	2–1	1927–28 British Home Championship	Wilf Lewis, Willie Davies	27,563
136	27 October 1928	Ibrox Park, Glasgow	A	Scotland	2–4	1928–29 British Home Championship	Willie Davies (2)	50,421
137	17 November 1928	Vetch Field, Swansea	H	England	2–3	1928–29 British Home Championship	Fred Keenor, Jack Fowler	22,000
138	2 February 1929	Racecourse Ground, Wrexham	H	Ireland	2–2	1928–29 British Home Championship	Albert Mays, Fred Warren	12,000
139	26 October 1929	Ninian Park, Cardiff	H	Scotland	2–4	1929–30 British Home Championship	Taffy O'Callaghan, Len Davies	20,000
140	17 November 1929	Wembley Stadium, London	A	England	0–6	1929–30 British Home Championship		25,500
141	1 February 1930	Windsor Park, Belfast	A	Ireland	0–7	1929–30 British Home Championship		25,000
142	25 October 1930	Ibrox Park, Glasgow	A	Scotland	1–1	1930–31 British Home Championship	Tommy Bamford	15,000
143	22 November 1930	Racecourse Ground, Wrexham	H	England	0–4	1930–31 British Home Championship		14,000
144	22 April 1931	Racecourse Ground, Wrexham	H	Ireland	3–2	1930–31 British Home Championship	Charlie Phillips, Tommy Griffiths, Fred Warren	11,000
145	31 October 1931	Racecourse Ground, Wrexham	H	Scotland	2–3	1931–32 British Home Championship	Ernie Curtis (2)	10,860
146	18 November 1931	Anfield, Liverpool	A	England	1–3	1931–32 British Home Championship	Walter Robbins	15,000
147	5 December 1931	Windsor Park, Belfast	A	Ireland	0–4	1931–32 British Home Championship		10,000
148	26 October 1932	Tynecastle Stadium, Edinburgh	A	Scotland	5–2	1932–33 British Home Championship	Eugene O'Callaghan (2), Dai Astley, Tommy Griffiths, Jock Thomson	31,000
149	6 November 1932	Racecourse Ground, Wrexham	H	England	0–0	1932–33 British Home Championship		25,167
150	7 December 1932	Racecourse Ground, Wrexham	H	Ireland	4–1	1932–33 British Home Championship	Walter Robbins (2), Dai Astley (2)	8,500
151	23 May 1933	Stade Olympique de Colombes, Paris	A	France	1–1	Friendly	Walter Robbins	25,000
152	4 October 1933	Ninian Park, Cardiff	H	Scotland	3–2	1933–34 British Home Championship	Willie Evans, Walter Robbins, Dai Astley	40,000
153	4 November 1933	Windsor Park, Belfast	A	Ireland	1–1	1933–34 British Home Championship	Pat Glover	20,000
154	15 November 1933	St James' Park, Newcastle	A	England	2–1	1933–34 British Home Championship	Tommy Mills, Dai Astley	15,000
155	29 September 1934	Ninian Park, Cardiff	H	England	0–4	1934–35 British Home Championship		36,692
156	21 November 1934	Pittodrie Stadium, Aberdeen	A	Scotland	2–3	1934–35 British Home Championship	Charlie Phillips, Dai Astley	26,334
157	25 March 1935	Racecourse Ground, Wrexham	H	Ireland	3–1	1934–35 British Home Championship	Wilson Jones, Charlie Phillips, Idris Hopkins	16,000
158	5 October 1935	Ninian Park, Cardiff	H	Scotland	1–1	1935–36 British Home Championship	Wilson Jones, Charlie Phillips	37,568
159	5 February 1935	Molineux Stadium, Wolverhampton	A	England	2–1	1935–36 British Home Championship	Dai Astley, Bryn Jones	27,519
160	11 March 1936	Celtic Park, Belfast	A	Ireland	2–3	1935–36 British Home Championship	Dai Astley, Charlie Phillips	27,519
161	17 October 1936	Ninian Park, Cardiff	H	England	2–1	1936–37 British Home Championship	Pat Glover, Seymour Morris	44,729
162	2 December 1936	Dens Park, Dundee	A	Scotland	2–1	1936–37 British Home Championship	Pat Glover (2)	23,858
163	17 March 1937	Racecourse Ground, Wrexham	H	Ireland	4–1	1936–37 British Home Championship	Pat Glover (2), Bryn Jones, Fred Warren	19,000
164	30 October 1937	Ninian Park, Cardiff	H	Scotland	2–1	1937–38 British Home Championship	Bryn Jones, Seymour Morris	41,800
165	17 November 1937	Ayresome Park, Middlesbrough	A	England	1–2	1937–38 British Home Championship	Eddie Perry	30,608
166	16 March 1938	Windsor Park, Belfast	A	Ireland	0–1	1937–38 British Home Championship		15,000
167	22 October 1938	Ninian Park, Cardiff	H	England	4–2	1938–39 British Home Championship	Dai Astley (2), Bryn Jones, Idris Hopkins	55,000
168	9 November 1938	Tynecastle Park, Edinburgh	A	Scotland	2–3	1938–39 British Home Championship	Dai Astley, Leslie Jones	34,800
169	15 March 1939	Racecourse Ground, Wrexham	H	Ireland	3–1	1938–39 British Home Championship	Horace Cumner, Pat Glover, Les Boulter	22,997
170	20 May 1939	Stade Olympique Yves-du-Manoir, Paris	A	France	1–2	Friendly	Dai Astley	23,000

== Head to head records ==
Head to head records
Opponent	P	W	D	L	GF	GA	W%	D%	L%
England	20	7	4	9	27	44	35	20	45
France	2	0	1	1	2	3	0	50	50
Ireland	20	8	6	6	35	42	40	30	30
Scotland	20	6	4	10	34	43	30	20	50
Totals	62	21	15	26	98	132	35.48	24.19	40.32
