= England national football team home stadium =

British football stadium

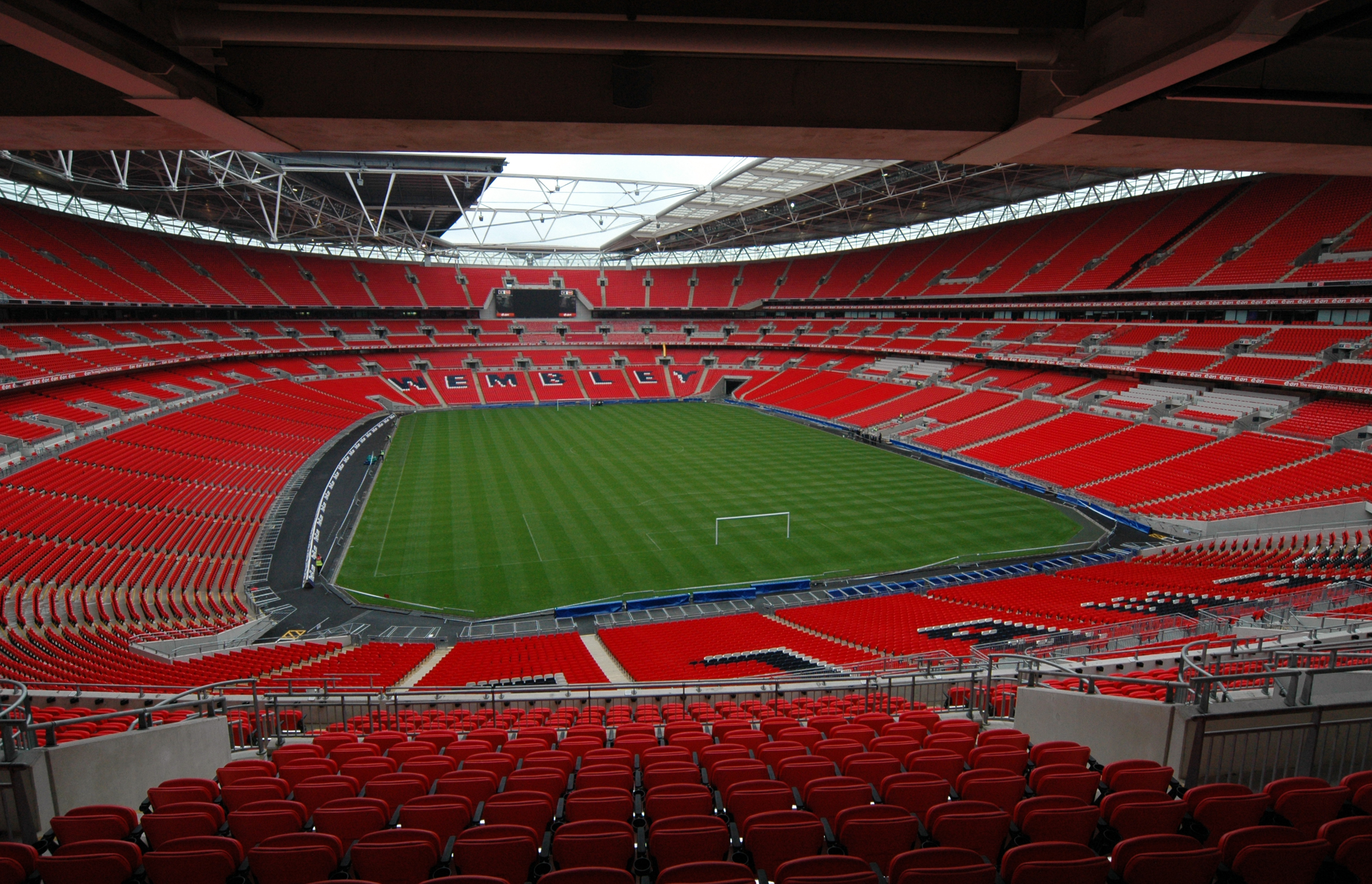
Wembley Stadium is the current home of the England national football team.

Wembley Stadium in London is the current exclusive home stadium for the England national football team. This has been the case since it was opened in 2007, following on from the old Wembley Stadium it replaced. England have however also played many of their home games away from Wembley throughout their history, both in friendly matches and for competitive tournaments.

== History ==
=== Pre-1923: Before Wembley ===
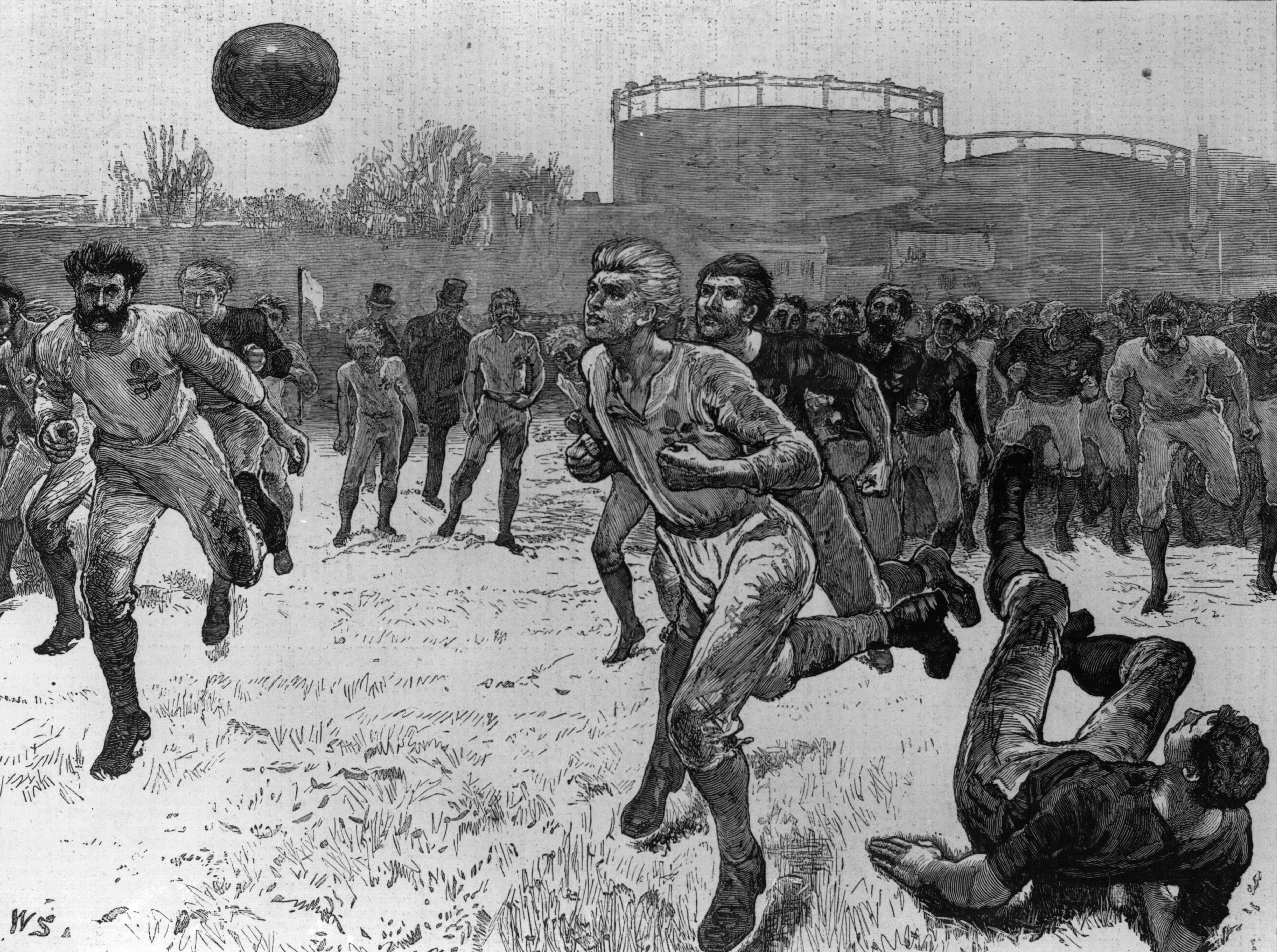
An illustration of an 1872 England vs Scotland representative match. The background shows the distinctive gas holder of The Oval.

The England team played their first official home match on 8 March 1873 (their second official international). During this period, England used various grounds around the country, including many cricket grounds, as their home venue. Surrey County Cricket Club's ground The Oval in south London was the first and most used venue of this time, following on from its use for the England v Scotland representative matches played between 1870 and 1872.

=== 1924–1999: Old Wembley ===
The old Wembley Stadium – the Empire Stadium

England played its first game at Wembley's Empire Stadium the following year in 1924, although Wembley was then only used for games against Scotland until May 1951, when England played Argentina. Wembley was then used increasingly for the next half-century, meaning just 10 home games were played outside of the Empire Stadium in the period after 1951 until 1999.

=== 2001–2007: On tour ===
The next series of non-Wembley home games, 34 in all, took place between 2001 and 2007, in the period between the closing of the Empire Stadium and the opening of the new Wembley Stadium, due to it being built on the same site. When the Empire Stadium closed in October 2000, the national team went "on tour". The stadium was not demolished until 2003, and the new stadium was not completed until 2007, well behind schedule. Manchester United's home stadium Old Trafford was the most used ground during the tour period.

The tour programme saw the England team return to several cities, for the first time in over 50 years. While the tour was considered a success, the cost of the stadium meant The Football Association had no plans to stage home games away from Wembley after 2007.

=== 2007–present: New Wembley ===
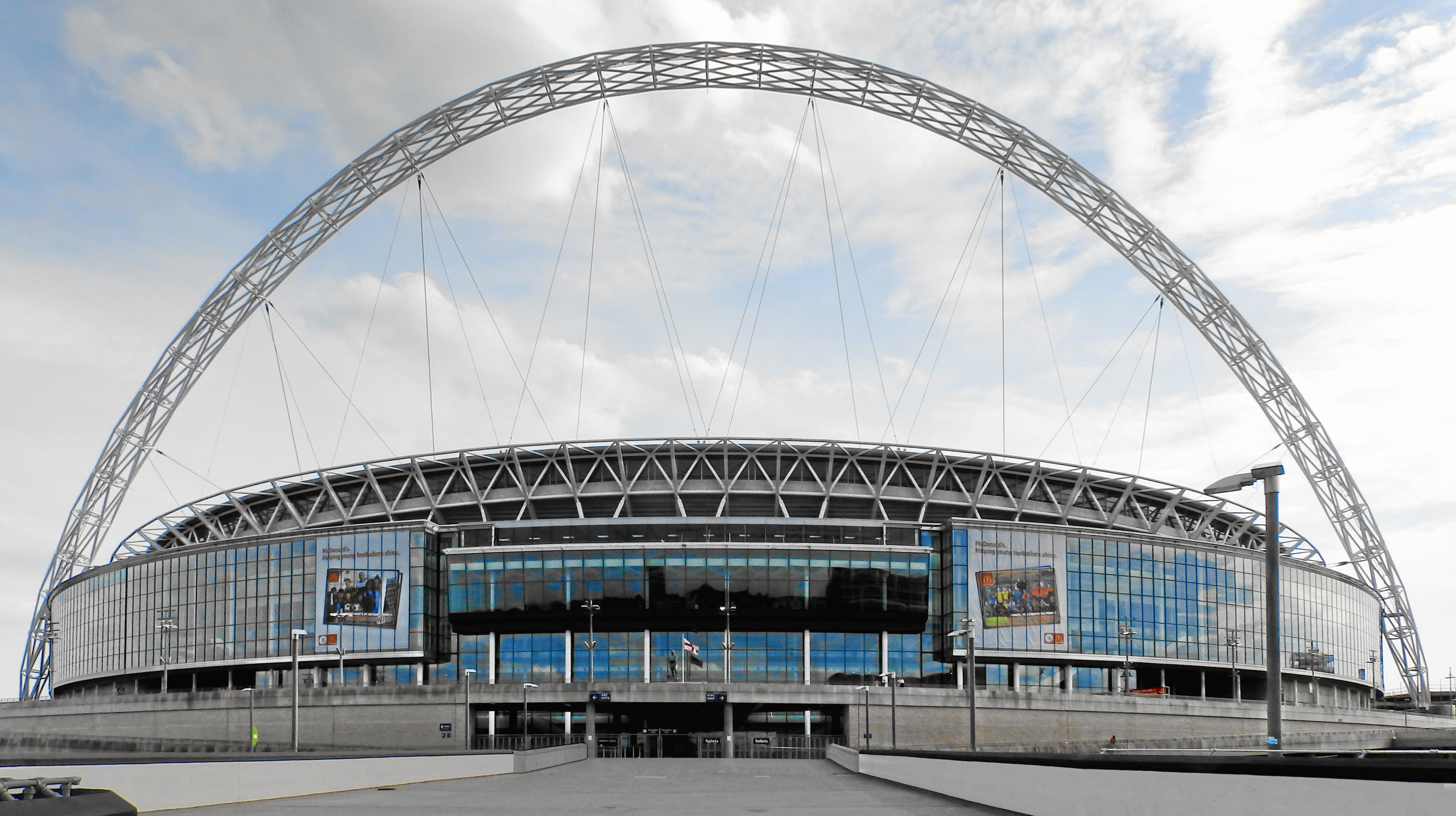
The new Wembley Stadium

The first England game at the new Wembley Stadium was on 1 June 2007, against Brazil.

In the build-up to Euro 2016, England played two games away from Wembley for the first time since Wembley's opening. They played against Turkey at Etihad Stadium, Manchester and against Australia at Stadium of Light, Sunderland.

== Non-Wembley home matches ==
#	Date	Score	Opposition	Stadium	Status	Note(s)
2	8 March 1873	4–2	Scotland	The Oval, Kennington, London	International match	Pre Wembley Stadium era
4	6 March 1875	2–2	Scotland	The Oval, Kennington, London	International match	Pre Wembley Stadium era
6	3 March 1877	1–3	Scotland	The Oval, Kennington, London	International match	Pre Wembley Stadium era
8	18 January 1879	2–1	Wales	The Oval, Kennington, London	International match	Pre Wembley Stadium era
9	5 April 1879	5–4	Scotland	The Oval, Kennington, London	International match	Pre Wembley Stadium era
12	26 February 1881	0–1	Wales	Alexandra Meadows, Blackburn	International match	Pre Wembley Stadium era
13	12 March 1881	1–6	Scotland	The Oval, Kennington, London	International match	Pre Wembley Stadium era
17	3 February 1883	5–0	Wales	The Oval, Kennington, London	International match	Pre Wembley Stadium era
18	24 February 1883	7–0	Ireland	Liverpool Cricket Ground, Liverpool	International match	Pre Wembley Stadium era
19	10 March 1883	2–3	Scotland	Bramall Lane, Sheffield	International match	Pre Wembley Stadium era
23	28 February 1885	4–0	Ireland	Whalley Range, Manchester	1884–85 British Home Championship	Pre Wembley Stadium era
24	14 March 1885	1–1	Wales	Leamington Road, Blackburn	1884–85 British Home Championship	Pre Wembley Stadium era
25	21 March 1885	1–1	Scotland	The Oval, Kennington, London	1884–85 British Home Championship	Pre Wembley Stadium era
29	5 February 1887	7–0	Ireland	Bramall Lane, Sheffield	1886–87 British Home Championship	Pre Wembley Stadium era
30	26 February 1887	4–0	Wales	The Oval, Kennington, London	1886–87 British Home Championship	Pre Wembley Stadium era
31	19 March 1887	2–3	Scotland	Leamington Road, Blackburn	1886–87 British Home Championship	Pre Wembley Stadium era
35	23 February 1889	4–1	Wales	Victoria Ground, Stoke-on-Trent	1888–89 British Home Championship	Pre Wembley Stadium era
36	2 March 1889	6–1	Ireland	Anfield, Liverpool	1888–89 British Home Championship	Pre Wembley Stadium era
37	13 April 1889	2–3	Scotland	The Oval, Kennington, London	1888–89 British Home Championship	Pre Wembley Stadium era
41	7 March 1891	6–1	Ireland	Molineux, Wolverhampton	1890–91 British Home Championship	Pre Wembley Stadium era
42	7 March 1891	4–1	Wales	Newcastle Road, Sunderland	1890–91 British Home Championship	Pre Wembley Stadium era
43	4 April 1891	2–1	Scotland	Ewood Park, Blackburn	1890–91 British Home Championship	Pre Wembley Stadium era
47	25 February 1893	6–1	Ireland	Wellington Road, Birmingham	1892–93 British Home Championship	Pre Wembley Stadium era
48	13 March 1893	6–0	Wales	Victoria Ground, Stoke-on-Trent	1892–93 British Home Championship	Pre Wembley Stadium era
49	1 April 1893	3–0	Scotland	Athletic Ground, Richmond, London	1892–93 British Home Championship	Pre Wembley Stadium era
53	9 March 1895	9–0	Ireland	Cricket Ground, Derby	1894–95 British Home Championship	Pre Wembley Stadium era
54	18 March 1895	1–1	Wales	Queen's Club, West Kensington, London	1894–95 British Home Championship	Pre Wembley Stadium era
55	6 April 1895	3–0	Scotland	Goodison Park, Liverpool	1894–95 British Home Championship	Pre Wembley Stadium era
59	20 February 1897	6–0	Ireland	Trent Bridge, Nottingham	1896–97 British Home Championship	Pre Wembley Stadium era
60	29 March 1897	4–0	Wales	Bramall Lane, Sheffield	1896–97 British Home Championship	Pre Wembley Stadium era
61	3 April 1897	1–2	Scotland	Crystal Palace Stadium, Crystal Palace, London	1896–97 British Home Championship	Pre Wembley Stadium era
65	18 February 1899	13–2	Ireland	Roker Park, Sunderland	1898–99 British Home Championship	Pre Wembley Stadium era
66	20 March 1899	4–0	Wales	Ashton Gate, Bristol	1898–99 British Home Championship	Pre Wembley Stadium era
67	8 April 1899	2–1	Scotland	Villa Park, Birmingham	1898–99 British Home Championship	Pre Wembley Stadium era
71	9 March 1901	3–0	Ireland	The Dell, Southampton	1900–01 British Home Championship	Pre Wembley Stadium era
72	18 March 1901	6–0	Wales	St James' Park, Newcastle upon Tyne	1900–01 British Home Championship	Pre Wembley Stadium era
73	30 March 1901	2–2	Scotland	Crystal Palace Stadium, Crystal Palace, London	1900–01 British Home Championship	Pre Wembley Stadium era
76	3 May 1902	2–2	Scotland	Villa Park, Birmingham	1901–02 British Home Championship	Pre Wembley Stadium era
77	14 February 1903	4–0	Ireland	Molineux, Wolverhampton	1902–03 British Home Championship	Pre Wembley Stadium era
78	2 March 1903	2–1	Wales	Fratton Park, Portsmouth	1902–03 British Home Championship	Pre Wembley Stadium era
79	4 April 1903	1–2	Scotland	Bramall Lane, Sheffield	1902–03 British Home Championship	Pre Wembley Stadium era
83	25 February 1905	1–1	Ireland	Ayresome Park, Middlesbrough	1904–05 British Home Championship	Pre Wembley Stadium era
84	27 March 1905	3–1	Wales	Anfield, Liverpool	1904–05 British Home Championship	Pre Wembley Stadium era
85	1 April 1905	1–0	Scotland	Crystal Palace Stadium, Crystal Palace, London	1904–05 British Home Championship	Pre Wembley Stadium era
89	16 February 1907	1–0	Ireland	Goodison Park, Liverpool	1906–07 British Home Championship	Pre Wembley Stadium era
90	18 March 1907	1–1	Ireland	Craven Cottage, Fulham, London	1906–07 British Home Championship	Pre Wembley Stadium era
91	6 April 1907	1–1	Scotland	St James' Park, Newcastle upon Tyne	1906–07 British Home Championship	Pre Wembley Stadium era
99	13 February 1909	4–0	Ireland	Park Avenue, Bradford	1908–09 British Home Championship	Pre Wembley Stadium era
100	15 March 1909	2–0	Wales	City Ground, Nottingham	1908–09 British Home Championship	Pre Wembley Stadium era
101	3 April 1909	2–0	Scotland	Crystal Palace Stadium, Crystal Palace, London	1908–09 British Home Championship	Pre Wembley Stadium era
108	11 February 1911	2–1	Ireland	Baseball Ground, Derby	1910–11 British Home Championship	Pre Wembley Stadium era
109	13 March 1911	3–0	Wales	The Den, New Cross, London	1910–11 British Home Championship	Pre Wembley Stadium era
110	1 April 1911	1–1	Scotland	Goodison Park, Liverpool	1910–11 British Home Championship	Pre Wembley Stadium era
115	17 March 1913	4–3	Wales	Ashton Gate, Bristol	1912–13 British Home Championship	Pre Wembley Stadium era
116	5 April 1913	1–0	Scotland	Stamford Bridge, Fulham, London	1912–13 British Home Championship	Pre Wembley Stadium era
117	14 February 1914	0–3	Ireland	Ayresome Park, Middlesbrough	1913–14 British Home Championship	Pre Wembley Stadium era
121	15 March 1920	1–2	Wales	Arsenal Stadium, Highbury, London	1919–20 British Home Championship	Pre Wembley Stadium era
122	10 April 1920	5–4	Scotland	Hillsborough, Sheffield	1919–20 British Home Championship	Pre Wembley Stadium era
123	23 October 1920	2–0	Ireland	Roker Park, Sunderland	1920–21 British Home Championship	Pre Wembley Stadium era
128	13 March 1922	1–0	Wales	Anfield, Liverpool	1921–22 British Home Championship	Pre Wembley Stadium era
129	8 April 1922	0–1	Scotland	Villa Park, Birmingham	1921–22 British Home Championship	Pre Wembley Stadium era
130	21 October 1922	2–0	Ireland	The Hawthorns, West Bromwich	1922–23 British Home Championship	Pre Wembley Stadium era
132	19 March 1923	6–1	Belgium	Arsenal Stadium, Highbury, London	International match	Pre Wembley Stadium era
139	3 March 1924	1–2	Wales	Ewood Park, Blackburn	1923–24 British Home Championship	Pre Wembley Stadium era
142	22 October 1924	3–1	Ireland	Goodison Park, Liverpool	1924–25 British Home Championship	Wembley Stadium (1923) era
143	8 December 1924	4–0	Belgium	The Hawthorns, West Bromwich	International match	Wembley Stadium (1923) era
148	1 March 1926	1–3	Wales	Selhurst Park, Selhurst, London	1925–26 British Home Championship	Wembley Stadium (1923) era
149	17 April 1926	0–1	Scotland	Old Trafford, Manchester	1925–26 British Home Championship	Wembley Stadium (1923) era
151	20 October 1926	3–3	Ireland	Anfield, Liverpool	1926–27 British Home Championship	Wembley Stadium (1923) era
158	28 November 1927	1–2	Wales	Turf Moor, Burnley	1927–28 British Home Championship	Wembley Stadium (1923) era
162	22 October 1928	2–1	Ireland	Goodison Park, Liverpool	1928–29 British Home Championship	Wembley Stadium (1923) era
169	22 November 1929	6–0	Wales	Stamford Bridge, Fulham, London	1929–30 British Home Championship	Wembley Stadium (1923) era
173	20 October 1930	5–1	Ireland	Bramall Lane, Sheffield	1930–31 British Home Championship	Wembley Stadium (1923) era
179	18 November 1931	3–1	Wales	Anfield, Liverpool	1931–32 British Home Championship	Wembley Stadium (1923) era
180	9 December 1931	7–1	Spain	Arsenal Stadium, Highbury, London	International match	Wembley Stadium (1923) era
182	17 October 1932	1–0	Ireland	Bloomfield Road, Blackpool	1932–33 British Home Championship	Wembley Stadium (1923) era
184	7 December 1932	4–3	Austria	Stamford Bridge, Fulham, London	International match	Wembley Stadium (1923) era
189	15 November 1933	1–2	Wales	St James' Park, Newcastle upon Tyne	1933–34 British Home Championship	Wembley Stadium (1923) era
190	6 December 1933	4–1	France	White Hart Lane, Tottenham, London	International match	Wembley Stadium (1923) era
195	14 November 1934	3–2	Italy	Arsenal Stadium, Highbury, London	International match	Wembley Stadium (1923) era
196	6 February 1935	2–1	Ireland	Goodison Park, Liverpool	1934–35 British Home Championship	Wembley Stadium (1923) era
200	4 December 1935	3–0	Germany	White Hart Lane, Tottenham, London	International match	Wembley Stadium (1923) era
201	5 February 1936	1–2	Wales	Molineux, Wolverhampton	1935–36 British Home Championship	Wembley Stadium (1923) era
206	18 November 1936	3–1	Ireland	Victoria Ground, Stoke-on-Trent	1936–37 British Home Championship	Wembley Stadium (1923) era
207	2 December 1936	6–2	Hungary	Arsenal Stadium, Highbury, London	International match	Wembley Stadium (1923) era
213	17 November 1937	2–1	Wales	Ayresome Park, Middlesbrough	1937–38 British Home Championship	Wembley Stadium (1923) era
214	1 December 1937	5–4	Czechoslovakia	White Hart Lane, Tottenham, London	International match	Wembley Stadium (1923) era
220	26 October 1938	3–0	The Rest of Europe	Arsenal Stadium, Highbury, London	International match	Wembley Stadium (1923) era
221	9 November 1938	4–0	Norway	St James' Park, Newcastle upon Tyne	International match	Wembley Stadium (1923) era
222	6 October 1938	7–0	Ireland	Old Trafford, Manchester	1938–39 British Home Championship	Wembley Stadium (1923) era
229	12 November 1946	3–0	Wales	Maine Road, Manchester	1946–47 British Home Championship	Wembley Stadium (1923) era
230	27 November 1946	8–2	Netherlands	Leeds Road, Huddersfield	International match	Wembley Stadium (1923) era
232	3 May 1947	3–0	France	Arsenal Stadium, Highbury, London	International match	Wembley Stadium (1923) era
237	5 November 1947	2–2	Ireland	Goodison Park, Liverpool	1947–48 British Home Championship	Wembley Stadium (1923) era
238	19 November 1947	4–2	Sweden	Arsenal Stadium, Highbury, London	International match	Wembley Stadium (1923) era
243	10 November 1948	1–0	Wales	Villa Park, Birmingham	1948–49 British Home Championship	Wembley Stadium (1923) era
244	2 December 1948	6–0	Switzerland	Arsenal Stadium, Highbury, London	International match	Wembley Stadium (1923) era
249	21 September 1949	0–2	Republic of Ireland	Goodison Park, Liverpool	International match	Wembley Stadium (1923) era
251	16 November 1949	9–2	Ireland	Maine Road, Manchester	1949–50 British Home Championship	Wembley Stadium (1923) era
252	30 November 1949	2–0	Italy	White Hart Lane, Tottenham, London	International match	Wembley Stadium (1923) era
260	15 November 1950	4–2	Wales	Roker Park, Sunderland	1950–51 British Home Championship	Wembley Stadium (1923) era
261	22 November 1950	2–2	Yugoslavia	Arsenal Stadium, Highbury, London	International match	Wembley Stadium (1923) era
264	19 May 1951	5–2	Portugal	Goodison Park, Liverpool	International match	Wembley Stadium (1923) era
265	3 October 1951	2–2	France	Arsenal Stadium, Highbury, London	International match	Wembley Stadium (1923) era
267	14 November 1951	2–0	Ireland	Villa Park, Birmingham	1951–52 British Home Championship	Wembley Stadium (1923) era
283	11 November 1953	3–1	Ireland	Goodison Park, Liverpool	1953–54 British Home Championship	Wembley Stadium (1923) era
310	5 December 1956	5–2	Denmark	Molineux, Wolverhampton	1958 FIFA World Cup qualification	Wembley Stadium (1923) era
328	26 November 1958	2–2	Wales	Villa Park, Birmingham	1958–59 British Home Championship	Wembley Stadium (1923) era
351	28 September 1961	4–1	Luxembourg	Arsenal Stadium, Highbury, London	1962 FIFA World Cup qualification	Wembley Stadium (1923) era
363	3 October 1962	1–1	France	Hillsborough, Sheffield	1964 European Nations' Cup qualifying	Wembley Stadium (1923) era
396	5 January 1966	1–1	Poland	Goodison Park, Liverpool	International match	Wembley Stadium (1923) era
712	8 June 1995	3–3	Sweden	Elland Road, Leeds	Umbro Cup	Wembley Stadium (1923) era
733	24 May 1997	2–1	South Africa	Old Trafford, Manchester	International match	Wembley Stadium (1923) era
762	10 October 1999	2–1	Belgium	Stadium of Light, Sunderland	International match	Wembley Stadium (1923) era
776	28 February 2001	3–0	Spain	Villa Park, Birmingham	International match	"On tour" era
777	24 March 2001	2–1	Finland	Anfield, Liverpool	2002 FIFA World Cup qualification	"On tour" era
779	25 May 2001	4–0	Mexico	Pride Park, Derby	International match	"On tour" era
781	15 August 2001	0–2	Netherlands	White Hart Lane, Tottenham, London	International match	"On tour" era
783	5 September 2001	2–0	Albania	St James' Park, Newcastle upon Tyne	2002 FIFA World Cup qualification	"On tour" era
784	6 October 2001	2–2	Greece	Old Trafford, Manchester	2002 FIFA World Cup qualification	"On tour" era
785	10 November 2001	1–1	Sweden	Old Trafford, Manchester	International match	"On tour" era
787	27 March 2002	1–2	Italy	Elland Road, Leeds	International match	"On tour" era
788	17 April 2002	4–0	Paraguay	Anfield, Liverpool	International match	"On tour" era
796	7 September 2002	1–1	Portugal	Villa Park, Birmingham	International match	"On tour" era
798	16 October 2002	2–2	Macedonia	St Mary's, Southampton	UEFA Euro 2004 qualifying	"On tour" era
799	12 February 2003	1–3	Australia	Boleyn Ground, Upton Park, London	International match	"On tour" era
801	2 April 2003	2–0	Turkey	Stadium of Light, Sunderland	UEFA Euro 2004 qualifying	"On tour" era
803	3 June 2003	2–1	Serbia and Montenegro	Walkers Stadium, Leicester	International match	"On tour" era
804	11 June 2003	2–1	Slovakia	Riverside Stadium, Middlesbrough	UEFA Euro 2004 qualifying	"On tour" era
805	20 August 2003	3–1	Croatia	Portman Road, Ipswich	International match	"On tour" era
807	10 September 2003	2–0	Liechtenstein	Old Trafford, Manchester	UEFA Euro 2004 qualifying	"On tour" era
809	16 November 2003	2–3	Denmark	Old Trafford, Manchester	International match	"On tour" era
812	1 June 2004	1–1	Japan	City of Manchester Stadium, Manchester	2004 FA Summer Tournament	"On tour" era
813	5 June 2004	6–1	Iceland	City of Manchester Stadium, Manchester	2004 FA Summer Tournament	"On tour" era
818	18 August 2004	3–0	Ukraine	St James' Park, Newcastle upon Tyne	International match	"On tour" era
821	9 October 2004	2–0	Wales	Old Trafford, Manchester	2006 FIFA World Cup qualification	"On tour" era
824	9 February 2005	0–0	Netherlands	Villa Park, Birmingham	International match	"On tour" era
825	26 March 2005	4–0	Northern Ireland	Old Trafford, Manchester	2006 FIFA World Cup qualification	"On tour" era
826	30 March 2005	2–0	Azerbaijan	St James' Park, Newcastle upon Tyne	2006 FIFA World Cup qualification	"On tour" era
832	8 October 2005	1–0	Austria	Old Trafford, Manchester	2006 FIFA World Cup qualification	"On tour" era
833	12 October 2005	2–1	Poland	Old Trafford, Manchester	2006 FIFA World Cup qualification	"On tour" era
835	1 March 2006	2–1	Uruguay	Anfield, Liverpool	International match	"On tour" era
836	30 May 2006	3–1	Hungary	Old Trafford, Manchester	International match	"On tour" era
837	3 June 2006	6–0	Jamaica	Old Trafford, Manchester	International match	"On tour" era
843	16 August 2006	4–0	Greece	Old Trafford, Manchester	International match	"On tour" era
844	2 September 2006	5–0	Andorra	Old Trafford, Manchester	UEFA Euro 2008 qualifying	"On tour" era
846	7 October 2006	0–0	Macedonia	Old Trafford, Manchester	UEFA Euro 2008 qualifying	"On tour" era
849	7 February 2007	0–1	Spain	Old Trafford, Manchester	International match	"On tour" era
953	22 May 2016	2–1	Turkey	City of Manchester Stadium, Manchester	International match	Wembley Stadium (2007) era
954	27 May 2016	2–1	Australia	Stadium of Light, Sunderland	International match	Wembley Stadium (2007) era
977	7 June 2018	2–0	Costa Rica	Elland Road, Leeds	International match	Wembley Stadium (2007) era
986	11 September 2018	1–0	Switzerland	King Power Stadium, Leicester	International match	Wembley Stadium (2007) era
998	10 September 2019	5–3	Kosovo	St Mary's, Southampton	UEFA Euro 2020 qualifying	Wembley Stadium (2007) era
1,013	2 June 2021	1–0	Austria	Riverside Stadium, Middlesbrough	International match	Wembley Stadium (2007) era
1,014	6 June 2021	1–0	Romania	Riverside Stadium, Middlesbrough	International match	Wembley Stadium (2007) era
1,033	11 June 2022	0–0	Italy	Molineux, Wolverhampton	2022–23 UEFA Nations League A	Wembley Stadium (2007) era
1,034	14 June 2022	0–4	Hungary	Molineux, Wolverhampton	2022–23 UEFA Nations League A	Wembley Stadium (2007) era
1,045	20 June 2023	7–0	North Macedonia	Old Trafford, Manchester	UEFA Euro 2024 qualifying	Wembley Stadium (2007) era
1,046	03 June 2024	3–0	Bosnia and Herzegovina	St James' Park, Newcastle upon Tyne	International Match	Wembley Stadium (2007) era
1,047	11 June 2025	1-3	Senegal	The City Ground, Nottingham	International Match	Wembley Stadium (2007) era
1,048	06 September 2025	2-0	Andorra	Villa Park, Birmingham	2026 FIFA World Cup qualification	Wembley Stadium (2007) era

Not included is the Northern Ireland game in 1973 at Goodison Park as Northern Ireland were the intended home team; the match was moved from Belfast to Liverpool due to ongoing civil unrest.
