= 1932–33 in Scottish football =

Football in Scotland
- Season: 1932–33

1932–33 in Scottish football

Division One champions
- Rangers

Division Two champions
- Hibernian

Scottish Cup winners
- Celtic

Junior Cup winners
- Yoker Athletic

Scotland national team
- 1933 BHC

The 1932–33 season was the 60th season of competitive football in Scotland and the 43rd season of the Scottish Football League.

== Scottish League Division One ==
Pos	Team	Pld	W	D	L	GF	GA	GD	Pts
1	Rangers	38	26	10	2	113	43	+70	62
2	Motherwell	38	27	5	6	114	53	+61	59
3	Heart of Midlothian	38	21	8	9	84	51	+33	50
4	Celtic	38	20	8	10	75	44	+31	48
5	St Johnstone	38	17	10	11	70	55	+15	44
6	Aberdeen	38	18	6	14	85	58	+27	42
7	St Mirren	38	18	6	14	73	60	+13	42
8	Hamilton Academical	38	18	6	14	90	78	+12	42
9	Queen's Park	38	17	7	14	78	79	−1	41
10	Partick Thistle	38	17	6	15	75	55	+20	40
11	Falkirk	38	15	6	17	70	70	0	36
12	Clyde	38	15	5	18	69	75	−6	35
13	Third Lanark	38	14	7	17	70	80	−10	35
14	Kilmarnock	38	13	9	16	72	86	−14	35
15	Dundee	38	12	9	17	60	77	−17	33
16	Ayr United	38	13	4	21	62	95	−33	30
17	Cowdenbeath	38	10	5	23	65	111	−46	25
18	Airdrieonians	38	10	3	25	55	102	−47	23
19	Morton	38	6	9	23	49	97	−48	21
20	East Stirlingshire	38	7	3	28	55	115	−60	17

Source: RSSSF

Champions: Rangers
Relegated: Greenock Morton, East Stirlingshire

== Scottish League Division Two ==
Pos	Team	Pld	W	D	L	GF	GA	GD	Pts	Promotion or relegation
1	Hibernian	37	28	4	5	99	33	+66	60	Promotion to the 1933–34 First Division
2	Queen of the South	35	21	9	5	103	59	+44	51	Promotion to the 1933–34 First Division
3	Dunfermline Athletic	35	21	7	7	98	45	+53	49	
4	Stenhousemir	36	20	6	10	74	62	+12	46	
5	Albion Rovers	35	20	2	13	85	59	+26	42	
6	Raith Rovers	36	18	4	14	90	69	+21	40	
7	Alloa Athletic	37	16	6	15	70	60	+10	38	
8	Dumbarton	36	16	6	14	77	69	+8	38	
9	East Fife	35	16	4	15	93	72	+21	36	
10	St Bernard's	35	14	6	15	73	67	+6	34	
11	King's Park	34	13	8	13	85	80	+5	34	
12	Arbroath	34	14	5	15	65	62	+3	33	
13	Dundee United	35	14	4	17	68	72	−4	32	
14	Forfar Athletic	35	13	4	18	71	89	−18	30	
15	Brechin City	36	12	4	20	71	101	−30	28	
16	Leith Athletic	36	10	6	20	46	85	−39	26	
17	Montrose	35	9	5	21	66	90	−24	23	
18	Edinburgh City	36	5	4	27	44	138	−94	14	
19	Armadale	0	0	0	0	0	0	0	0	Expelled (Note: Armadale & Bo'ness were expelled for failing to meet match guarantees; their records were expunged.)
20	Bo'ness	0	0	0	0	0	0	0	0	Expelled

Notes:

NOTE: Armadale & Bo'ness were expelled for failing to meet match guarantees; their records were expunged.

Promoted: Hibernian, Queen of the South

== Scottish Cup ==
Celtic were winners of the Scottish Cup with a 1–0 final win over Motherwell.

== Other honours ==
=== National ===
Competition	Winner	Score	Runner-up
Scottish Qualifying Cup – North	Inverness Thistle	4–3	Penicuik Athletic
Scottish Qualifying Cup – South	Beith	4–2	Falkirk Amateurs

=== County ===
Competition	Winner	Score	Runner-up
Aberdeenshire Cup	Aberdeen	5–2 *	Buckie Thistle
Ayrshire Cup	Ayr United	3–1	Kilmarnock
Dumbartonshire Cup	Dumbarton	2–0	Vale Ocaba
East of Scotland Shield	Hearts	4–0	Hibernian
Fife Cup	East Fife	2–1	Raith Rovers
Forfarshire Cup	Montrose	1–0	Dundee
Glasgow Cup	Rangers	1–0	Partick Thistle
Lanarkshire Cup	Motherwell	7–5 *	Airdrie
Perthshire Cup	Vale of Atholl	5–0	Moulin City
Renfrewshire Cup	St Mirren	3–1 *	Morton
Southern Counties Cup	Stranraer		
Stirlingshire Cup	Stenhousemuir	4–2	Falkirk

^{*} – aggregate over two legs

=== Highland League ===
Top Three
Pos	Team	Pld	W	D	L	GF	GA	GD	Pts
1	Fraserburgh	26	21	1	4	72	33	+39	43
2	Elgin City	26	15	4	7	76	59	+17	34
3	Buckie Thistle	26	12	6	8	78	58	+20	30

== Junior Cup ==
Yoker Athletic were winners of the Junior Cup after a 4–2 win over Tranent in the final replay.

== Scotland national team ==
Date	Venue	Opponents	Score	Competition	Scotland scorer(s)
17 September 1932	Windsor Park, Belfast (A)	Ireland	4–0	BHC	Bob McPhail (2), James King, Jimmy McGrory
26 October 1932	Tynecastle Park, Edinburgh (H)	Wales	2–5	BHC	Dally Duncan, Neil Dewar
1 April 1933	Hampden Park, Glasgow (H)	England	2–1	BHC	Jimmy McGrory (2)

Key:

- (H) = Home match
- (A) = Away match
- BHC = British Home Championship
