= 1936–37 in Scottish football =

Football in Scotland
- Season: 1936–37

1936–37 in Scottish football

Division One champions
- Rangers

Division Two champions
- Ayr United

Scottish Cup winners
- Celtic

Junior Cup winners
- Arthurlie

Scotland national team
- 1937 BHC

The 1936–37 season was the 64th season of competitive football in Scotland and the 47th season of the Scottish Football League.

== Scottish League Division One ==
| Pos | Team | Pld | W | D | L | GF | GA | GD | Pts |
|---|---|---|---|---|---|---|---|---|---|
| 1 | Rangers | 38 | 26 | 9 | 3 | 88 | 32 | +56 | 61 |
| 2 | Aberdeen | 38 | 23 | 8 | 7 | 89 | 44 | +45 | 54 |
| 3 | Celtic | 38 | 22 | 8 | 8 | 89 | 58 | +31 | 52 |
| 4 | Motherwell | 38 | 22 | 7 | 9 | 96 | 54 | +42 | 51 |
| 5 | Heart of Midlothian | 38 | 24 | 3 | 11 | 99 | 60 | +39 | 51 |
| 6 | Third Lanark | 38 | 20 | 6 | 12 | 79 | 61 | +18 | 46 |
| 7 | Falkirk | 38 | 19 | 6 | 13 | 98 | 66 | +32 | 44 |
| 8 | Hamilton Academical | 38 | 18 | 5 | 15 | 91 | 96 | −5 | 41 |
| 9 | Dundee | 38 | 12 | 15 | 11 | 58 | 69 | −11 | 39 |
| 10 | Clyde | 38 | 16 | 6 | 16 | 59 | 70 | −11 | 38 |
| 11 | Kilmarnock | 38 | 14 | 9 | 15 | 60 | 70 | −10 | 37 |
| 12 | St Johnstone | 38 | 14 | 8 | 16 | 74 | 68 | +6 | 36 |
| 13 | Partick Thistle | 38 | 11 | 12 | 15 | 73 | 68 | +5 | 34 |
| 14 | Arbroath | 38 | 13 | 5 | 20 | 57 | 84 | −27 | 31 |
| 15 | Queen's Park | 38 | 9 | 12 | 17 | 51 | 77 | −26 | 30 |
| 16 | St Mirren | 38 | 11 | 7 | 20 | 68 | 81 | −13 | 29 |
| 17 | Hibernian | 38 | 6 | 13 | 19 | 54 | 83 | −29 | 25 |
| 18 | Queen of the South | 38 | 8 | 8 | 22 | 49 | 95 | −46 | 24 |
| 19 | Dunfermline Athletic | 38 | 5 | 11 | 22 | 65 | 98 | −33 | 21 |
| 20 | Albion Rovers | 38 | 5 | 6 | 27 | 53 | 116 | −63 | 16 |

Source: RSSSF

Champions: Rangers
Relegated: Dunfermline Athletic, Albion Rovers

== Scottish League Division Two ==
| Pos | Team | Pld | W | D | L | GF | GA | GD | Pts | Promotion or relegation |
|---|---|---|---|---|---|---|---|---|---|---|
| 1 | Ayr United | 34 | 25 | 4 | 5 | 122 | 49 | +73 | 54 | Promotion to the 1937–38 First Division |
| 2 | Morton | 34 | 23 | 5 | 6 | 110 | 42 | +68 | 51 | Promotion to the 1937–38 First Division |
| 3 | St Bernard's | 34 | 22 | 4 | 8 | 100 | 51 | +49 | 48 | |
| 4 | Airdrieonians | 34 | 18 | 8 | 8 | 85 | 60 | +25 | 44 | |
| 5 | East Fife | 34 | 15 | 8 | 11 | 76 | 51 | +25 | 38 | |
| 6 | Cowdenbeath | 34 | 14 | 10 | 10 | 75 | 59 | +16 | 38 | |
| 7 | East Stirlingshire | 34 | 18 | 2 | 14 | 81 | 78 | +3 | 38 | |
| 8 | Raith Rovers | 34 | 16 | 4 | 14 | 72 | 66 | +6 | 36 | |
| 9 | Alloa Athletic | 34 | 13 | 7 | 14 | 64 | 65 | −1 | 33 | |
| 10 | Stenhousemuir | 34 | 14 | 4 | 16 | 82 | 86 | −4 | 32 | |
| 11 | Leith Athletic | 34 | 13 | 5 | 16 | 62 | 65 | −3 | 31 | |
| 12 | Forfar Athletic | 34 | 11 | 8 | 15 | 73 | 89 | −16 | 30 | |
| 13 | Montrose | 34 | 11 | 6 | 17 | 65 | 98 | −33 | 28 | |
| 14 | Dundee United | 34 | 9 | 9 | 16 | 72 | 97 | −25 | 27 | |
| 15 | Dumbarton | 34 | 11 | 5 | 18 | 57 | 83 | −26 | 27 | |
| 16 | Brechin City | 34 | 8 | 9 | 17 | 64 | 98 | −34 | 25 | |
| 17 | King's Park | 34 | 11 | 3 | 20 | 61 | 106 | −45 | 25 | |
| 18 | Edinburgh City | 34 | 2 | 3 | 29 | 42 | 120 | −78 | 7 | |

Source: "1936-1937 Division 2 - SPFL Archive". SPFL.

Promoted: Ayr United, Greenock Morton

== Scottish Cup ==
Celtic were winners of the Scottish Cup after a 2–1 final win over Aberdeen.

== Other Honours ==
=== National ===
| Competition | Winner | Score | Runner-up |
|---|---|---|---|
| Scottish Qualifying Cup – North | Vale Ocaba | 4–2 | Keith |
| Scottish Qualifying Cup – South | Duns | 2–1 | Galston |

=== County ===
| Competition | Winner | Score | Runner-up |
|---|---|---|---|
| Aberdeenshire Cup | Buckie Thistle | 7–2 * | Aberdeen University |
| Dumbartonshire Cup | Dumbarton | 2–0 | Vale Ocaba |
| East of Scotland Shield | Hearts | 6–2 | Hibernian |
| Fife Cup | East Fife | 1–0 | Dunfermline Athletic |
| Forfarshire Cup | Arbroath | 3–1 # | Brechin City |
| Glasgow Cup | Rangers | 6–1 # | Partick Thistle |
| Lanarkshire Cup | Motherwell | 6–1 * | Airdrie |
| Perthshire Cup | Breadalbane | 4–1 * | Blairgowrie |
| Renfrewshire Cup | Morton | 1–0 | St Mirren |
| Southern Counties Cup | Stranraer | 2–1 | St Cuthbert Wanderers |
| Stirlingshire Cup | Stenhousemuir | 6–4 * | Alloa Athletic |

- * – aggregate over two legs
- # – replay

=== Highland League ===
Top Three
| Pos | Team | Pld | W | D | L | GF | GA | GD | Pts |
|---|---|---|---|---|---|---|---|---|---|
| 1 | Buckie Thistle | 22 | 16 | 3 | 3 | 65 | 30 | +35 | 35 |
| 2 | Peterhead | 22 | 12 | 4 | 6 | 69 | 44 | +25 | 28 |
| 3 | Elgin City | 22 | 11 | 5 | 6 | 78 | 47 | +31 | 27 |

== Junior Cup ==
Arthurlie were winners of the Junior Cup after a 5–1 win over Kirkintilloch Rob Roy in the final.

== Scotland national team ==
| Date | Venue | Opponents | Score | Competition | Scotland scorer(s) |
|---|---|---|---|---|---|
| 14 October 1936 | Ibrox Park, Glasgow (H) | Germany | 2–0 | Friendly | Jimmy Delaney (2) |
| 31 October 1936 | Windsor Park, Belfast (A) | Ireland | 3–1 | BHC | Charles Napier, Alex Munro, David McCulloch |
| 2 December 1936 | Dens Park, Dundee (H) | Wales | 1–2 | BHC | Tommy Walker |
| 17 April 1937 | Hampden Park, Glasgow (H) | England | 3–1 | BHC | Bob McPhail (2), Frank O'Donnell |
| 9 May 1937 | Prater Stadium, Vienna (A) | Austria | 1–1 | Friendly | Frank O'Donnell |
| 22 May 1937 | Stadion Sparta-Letna, Prague (A) | Czechoslovakia | 3–1 | Friendly | James Simpson, Bob McPhail, Torry Gillick |

Key:

- (H) = Home match
- (A) = Away match
- BHC = British Home Championship
