= 1934–35 in Scottish football =

Football in Scotland
- Season: 1934–35

1934–35 in Scottish football

Division One champions
- Rangers

Division Two champions
- Third Lanark

Scottish Cup winners
- Rangers

Junior Cup winners
- Tranent

Scotland national team
- 1935 BHC

The 1934–35 season was the 62nd season of competitive football in Scotland and the 45th season of the Scottish Football League.

== Scottish League Division One ==
Pos	Team	Pld	W	D	L	GF	GA	GD	Pts
1	Rangers	38	25	5	8	96	46	+50	55
2	Celtic	38	24	4	10	92	45	+47	52
3	Hearts	38	20	10	8	87	51	+36	50
4	Hamilton Academical	38	19	10	9	87	67	+20	48
5	St Johnstone	38	18	10	10	66	46	+20	46
6	Aberdeen	38	17	10	11	68	54	+14	44
7	Motherwell	38	15	10	13	83	64	+19	40
8	Dundee	38	16	8	14	63	63	0	40
9	Kilmarnock	38	16	6	16	76	68	+8	38
10	Clyde	38	14	10	14	71	69	+2	38
11	Hibernian	38	14	8	16	59	70	−11	36
12	Queen's Park	38	13	10	15	61	80	−19	36
13	Partick Thistle	38	15	5	18	61	68	−7	35
14	Airdrieonians	38	13	7	18	64	72	−8	33
15	Dunfermline Athletic	38	13	5	20	56	96	−40	31
16	Albion Rovers	38	10	9	19	62	77	−15	29
17	Queen of the South	38	11	7	20	52	72	−20	29
18	Ayr United	38	12	5	21	61	112	−51	29
19	St Mirren	38	11	5	22	49	70	−21	27
20	Falkirk	38	9	6	23	58	82	−24	24

Source: RSSSF

Champions: Rangers
Relegated: St Mirren, Falkirk

== Scottish League Division Two ==
Pos	Team	Pld	W	D	L	GF	GA	GD	Pts	Promotion or relegation
1	Third Lanark	34	23	6	5	94	43	+51	52	Promotion to the 1935–36 First Division
2	Arbroath	34	23	4	7	78	42	+36	50	Promotion to the 1935–36 First Division
3	St Bernard's	34	20	7	7	103	47	+56	47	
4	Dundee United	34	18	6	10	105	65	+40	42	
5	Stenhousemuir	34	17	5	12	86	80	+6	39	
6	Morton	34	17	4	13	88	64	+24	38	
7	King's Park	34	18	2	14	86	71	+15	38	
8	Leith Athletic	34	16	5	13	69	71	−2	37	
9	East Fife	34	16	3	15	79	73	+6	35	
10	Alloa Athletic	34	12	10	12	67	60	+7	34	
11	Forfar Athletic	34	13	8	13	77	73	+4	34	
12	Cowdenbeath	34	13	6	15	84	75	+9	32	
13	Raith Rovers	34	13	3	18	68	73	−5	29	
14	East Stirlingshire	34	11	7	16	57	76	−19	29	
15	Brechin City	34	10	6	18	51	98	−47	26	
16	Dumbarton	34	9	4	21	60	105	−45	22	
17	Montrose	34	7	6	21	58	105	−47	20	
18	Edinburgh City	34	3	2	29	44	133	−89	8	

Source: "1934-1935 Division 2 - SPFL Archive". SPFL (in Malay).

Promoted: Third Lanark, Arbroath

== Scottish Cup ==
Division One champions Rangers were winners of the Scottish Cup final after a 2–1 final win over Hamilton Academical.

== Other Honours ==
=== National ===
Competition	Winner	Score	Runner-up
Scottish Qualifying Cup – North	Clachnacuddin	2 – 0	Rosyth Dockyard Rec
Scottish Qualifying Cup – South	Beith	2 – 1	Bo'ness

=== County ===
Competition	Winner	Score	Runner-up
Aberdeenshire Cup	Peterhead	2 – 1 *	Huntly
Ayrshire Cup	Kilmarnock	11 – 3 *	Ayr United
Dumbartonshire Cup	Vale Ocaba	4 – 1 #	Dumbarton
East of Scotland Shield	Hibernian	4 – 2	Hearts
Fife Cup	Cowdenbeath	2 – 1	Dunfermline Athletic
Forfarshire Cup	Dundee	1 – 0 #	Arbroath
Glasgow Cup	Partick Thistle	1 – 0	Rangers
Lanarkshire Cup	Airdrie	5 – 3 *	Albion Rovers
Perthshire Cup	Blairgowrie	3 – 1	Vale of Atholl
Renfrewshire Cup	Morton	4 – 0	St Mirren
Southern Counties Cup	Queen of the South		
Stirlingshire Cup	Falkirk	9 – 3 *	King's Park

- * - aggregate over two legs
- # - replay

=== Highland League ===
Top Three
Pos	Team	Pld	W	D	L	GF	GA	GD	Pts
1	Elgin City	24	16	4	4	72	33	+39	36
2	Huntly	24	15	4	5	71	48	+23	34
3	Inverness Thistle	24	14	4	6	84	57	+27	32

== Junior Cup ==
Tranent were winners of the Junior Cup after a 6–1 win over Petershill in the final.

== Scotland national team ==
Date	Venue	Opponents	Score	Competition	Scotland scorer(s)
20 October 1934	Windsor Park, Belfast (A)	Ireland	1–2	BHC	Patrick Gallacher
21 November 1934	Ninian Park, Cardiff (A)	Wales	3–2	BHC	Charles Napier (2), Dally Duncan
6 April 1935	Hampden Park, Glasgow (H)	England	2–0	BHC	Dally Duncan (2)

Key:

- (H) = Home match
- (A) = Away match
- BHC = British Home Championship
