= 1935–36 in Scottish football =

Football in Scotland
- Season: 1935–36

1935–36 in Scottish football

Division One champions
- Celtic

Division Two champions
- Falkirk

Scottish Cup winners
- Rangers

Junior Cup winners
- Benburb

Scotland national team
- 1936 BHC

The 1935–36 season was the 63rd season of competitive football in Scotland and the 46th season of the Scottish Football League.

== Scottish League Division One ==
Pos	Team	Pld	W	D	L	GF	GA	GD	Pts
1	Celtic	38	32	2	4	115	33	+82	66
2	Rangers	38	27	7	4	110	43	+67	61
3	Aberdeen	38	26	9	3	96	50	+46	61
4	Motherwell	38	18	12	8	77	58	+19	48
5	Heart of Midlothian	38	20	7	11	88	55	+33	47
6	Hamilton Academical	38	15	7	16	77	74	+3	37
7	St Johnstone	38	15	7	16	70	81	−11	37
8	Kilmarnock	38	14	7	17	69	64	+5	35
9	Third Lanark	38	15	5	18	63	65	−2	35
10	Partick Thistle	38	12	10	16	64	72	−8	34
11	Arbroath	38	11	11	16	46	69	−23	33
12	Dundee	38	11	10	17	67	80	−13	32
13	Queen's Park	38	11	10	17	58	75	−17	32
14	Dunfermline Athletic	38	12	8	18	67	92	−25	32
15	Queen of the South	38	11	9	18	54	72	−18	31
16	Albion Rovers	38	13	4	21	69	92	−23	30
17	Hibernian	38	11	7	20	56	82	−26	29
18	Clyde	38	10	8	20	63	84	−21	28
19	Airdrieonians	38	9	9	20	68	91	−23	27
20	Ayr United	38	11	3	24	53	98	−45	25

Source: RSSSF

Champions: Celtic
Relegated: Airdrie, Ayr United

== Scottish League Division Two ==
Pos	Team	Pld	W	D	L	GF	GA	GD	Pts	Promotion or relegation
1	Falkirk	34	28	3	3	132	34	+98	59	Promotion to the 1936–37 First Division
2	St Mirren	34	25	2	7	114	41	+73	52	Promotion to the 1936–37 First Division
3	Morton	34	21	6	7	117	60	+57	48	
4	Alloa Athletic	34	19	6	9	65	51	+14	44	
5	St Bernard's	34	18	4	12	106	78	+28	40	
6	East Fife	34	16	6	12	86	79	+7	38	
7	Dundee United	34	16	5	13	108	81	+27	37	
8	East Stirlingshire	34	13	8	13	70	75	−5	34	
9	Leith Athletic	34	15	3	16	67	77	−10	33	
10	Cowdenbeath	34	13	5	16	76	77	−1	31	
11	Stenhousemuir	34	13	3	18	59	78	−19	29	
12	Montrose	34	13	3	18	58	82	−24	29	
13	Forfar Athletic	34	10	7	17	60	81	−21	27	
14	King's Park	34	11	5	18	55	109	−54	27	
15	Edinburgh City	34	8	9	17	57	83	−26	25	
16	Brechin City	34	8	6	20	57	96	−39	22	
17	Raith Rovers	34	9	3	22	60	96	−36	21	
18	Dumbarton	34	5	6	23	52	121	−69	16	

Source: "1935-1936 Division 2 - SPFL Archive". SPFL.

Promoted: Falkirk, St Mirren

== Scottish Cup ==
Rangers were winners of the Scottish Cup for the third time in a row after a 1–0 final win over Third Lanark.

== Other honours ==
=== National ===
Competition	Winner	Score	Runner-up
Scottish Qualifying Cup – North	Elgin City	4–2	Blairgowrie
Scottish Qualifying Cup – South	Galston	4–0	Bo'ness

=== County ===
Competition	Winner	Score	Runner-up
Aberdeenshire Cup	Keith	3–1 *	Peterhead
Ayrshire Cup	Ayr United	3–2 #	Kilmarnock
Dumbartonshire Cup	Dumbarton	1–0	Vale Ocaba
East of Scotland Shield	Hearts	3–1 #	St Bernard's
Fife Cup	Raith Rovers	3–0	East Fife
Forfarshire Cup	Arbroath	1–0	Montrose
Glasgow Cup	Rangers	2–0	Celtic
Lanarkshire Cup	Airdrie	5–1 *	Hamilton
Perthshire Cup	Blairgowrie	2–1 *	Fair City Athletic
Renfrewshire Cup	St Mirren	3–0	Morton
Southern Counties Cup	Queen of the South	4–2	Creetown
Stirlingshire Cup	East Stirlingshire	2–1 *	Alloa Athletic

- * – aggregate over two legs
- # – replay

=== Highland League ===
Top Three
Pos	Team	Pld	W	D	L	GF	GA	GD	Pts
1	Inverness Thistle	22	18	1	3	79	32	+47	37
2	Peterhead	22	14	1	7	68	50	+18	29
3	Forres Mechanics	22	13	2	7	62	47	+15	28

== Junior Cup ==
Benburb were winners of the Junior Cup after a 1–0 win over Yoker Athletic in the final replay.

== Scotland national team ==
Date	Venue	Opponents	Score	Competition	Scotland scorer(s)
5 October 1935	Ninian Park, Cardiff (A)	Wales	1–1	BHC	Dally Duncan
13 November 1935	Tynecastle Park, Edinburgh (H)	Ireland	2–1	BHC	Thomas Walker, Dally Duncan
4 April 1936	Wembley Stadium, London (A)	England	1–1	BHC	Thomas Walker (pen.)

Scotland was winner of the 1935–36 British Home Championship.

Key:

- (H) = Home match
- (A) = Away match
- BHC = British Home Championship
