= 1933–34 in Scottish football =

Football in Scotland
- Season: 1933–34

1933–34 in Scottish football

Division One champions
- Rangers

Division Two champions
- Albion Rovers

Scottish Cup winners
- Rangers

Junior Cup winners
- Benburb

Scotland national team
- 1934 BHC

The 1933–34 season was the 61st season of competitive football in Scotland and the 44th season of the Scottish Football League.

== Scottish League Division One ==
Pos	Team	Pld	W	D	L	GF	GA	GD	Pts	Qualification or relegation
1	Rangers	38	30	6	2	118	41	+77	66	Champions
2	Motherwell	38	29	4	5	97	45	+52	62	
3	Celtic	38	18	11	9	78	53	+25	47	
4	Queen of the South	38	21	3	14	75	48	+27	45	
5	Aberdeen	38	18	8	12	90	57	+33	44	
6	Heart of Midlothian	38	17	10	11	86	59	+27	44	
7	Kilmarnock	38	17	9	12	73	64	+9	43	
8	Ayr United	38	16	10	12	87	92	−5	42	
9	St Johnstone	38	17	6	15	74	53	+21	40	
10	Falkirk	38	16	6	16	73	68	+5	38	
11	Hamilton Academical	38	15	8	15	65	79	−14	38	
12	Dundee	38	15	6	17	68	64	+4	36	
13	Partick Thistle	38	14	5	19	73	78	−5	33	
14	Clyde	38	10	11	17	56	70	−14	31	
15	Queen's Park	38	13	5	20	65	85	−20	31	
16	Hibernian	38	12	3	23	51	69	−18	27	
17	St Mirren	38	9	9	20	46	75	−29	27	
18	Airdrieonians	38	10	6	22	59	103	−44	26	
19	Third Lanark	38	8	9	21	62	103	−41	25	Relegated to Second Division
20	Cowdenbeath	38	5	5	28	58	118	−60	15	Relegated to Second Division

Source: RSSSF

Champions: Rangers
Relegated: Third Lanark, Cowdenbeath

== Scottish League Division Two ==
Pos	Team	Pld	W	D	L	GF	GA	GD	Pts	Promotion or relegation
1	Albion Rovers	34	20	5	9	74	47	+27	45	Promotion to the 1934–35 First Division
2	Dunfermline Athletic	34	20	4	10	90	52	+38	44	Promotion to the 1934–35 First Division
3	Arbroath	34	20	4	10	83	53	+30	44	
4	Stenhousemir	34	18	4	12	70	73	−3	40	
5	Morton	34	17	5	12	67	64	+3	39	
6	Dumbarton	34	17	3	14	67	68	−1	37	
7	King's Park	34	14	8	12	78	70	+8	36	
8	Raith Rovers	34	15	5	14	71	55	+16	35	
9	East Stirlingshire	34	14	7	13	65	74	−9	35	
10	St Bernard's	34	15	4	15	75	56	+19	34	
11	Forfar Athletic	34	13	7	14	77	71	+6	33	
12	Leith Athletic	34	12	8	14	63	60	+3	32	
13	East Fife	34	12	8	14	71	76	−5	32	
14	Brechin City	34	13	5	16	60	70	−10	31	
15	Alloa Athletic	34	11	9	14	55	68	−13	31	
16	Montrose	34	11	4	19	53	81	−28	26	
17	Dundee United	34	10	4	20	81	88	−7	24	
18	Edinburgh City	34	4	6	24	37	111	−74	14	

Source: "1933-1934 Division 2 - SPFL Archive". SPFL (in Malay).

Promoted: Albion Rovers, Dunfermline Athletic

== Scottish Cup ==
Division One champions Rangers were winners of the Scottish Cup final after a 5–0 final win over St Mirren.

== Other honours ==
=== National ===
Competition	Winner	Score	Runner-up
Scottish Qualifying Cup – North	Rosyth Dockyard Rec	4–1	Ross County
Scottish Qualifying Cup – South	Penicuik Athletic	3–2	Galston

=== County ===
Competition	Winner	Score	Runner-up
Aberdeenshire Cup	Aberdeen	7–4 *	Keith
Dumbartonshire Cup	Vale Ocaba	3–1	Dumbarton
East of Scotland Shield	Hearts	4–0	Hibernian
Fife Cup	Dunfermline Athletic	2–1	Cowdenbeath
Forfarshire Cup	Arbroath	4–1	Brechin City
Glasgow Cup	Rangers	2–0	Clyde
Lanarkshire Cup	Hamilton	7–3 *	Albion Rovers
Perthshire Cup	Blairgowrie	5–4	Vale of Atholl
Renfrewshire Cup	St Mirren	11–3 *	Morton
Southern Counties Cup	Dalbeattie Star		
Stirlingshire Cup	Alloa Athletic	5–4 *	East Stirlingshire

^{*} – aggregate over two legs

=== Highland League ===
Top Three
Pos	Team	Pld	W	D	L	GF	GA	GD	Pts
1	Buckie Thistle	26	22	3	1	95	36	+59	47
2	Forres Mechanics	26	15	3	8	78	57	+21	33
3	Keith	26	15	3	8	73	57	+16	33

== Junior Cup ==
Benburb were winners of the Junior Cup after a 3–1 win over Bridgeton Waverley in the final.

== Scotland national team ==
Date	Venue	Opponents	Score	Competition	Scotland scorer(s)
16 September 1933	Hampden Park, Glasgow (H)	Ireland	1–2	BHC	Bob McPhail
4 October 1933	Ninian Park, Cardiff (A)	Wales	2–3	BHC	Willie MacFadyen, Dally Duncan
29 November 1933	Hampden Park, Glasgow (H)	Austria	2–2	Friendly	David Meiklejohn, Willie MacFadyen
14 April 1934	Wembley Stadium, London (A)	England	0–3	BHC	

Key:

- (H) = Home match
- (A) = Away match
- BHC = British Home Championship
