= 1930–31 in Scottish football =

Football in Scotland
- Season: 1930–31

1930–31 in Scottish football

Division One champions
- Rangers

Division Two champions
- Third Lanark

Scottish Cup winners
- Celtic

Junior Cup winners
- Denny Hibs

Scotland national team
- 1931 BHC

The 1930–31 season was the 58th season of competitive football in Scotland and the 41st season of the Scottish Football League.

== Scottish League Division One ==
Pos	Team	Pld	W	D	L	GF	GA	GD	Pts
1	Rangers	38	27	6	5	96	29	+67	60
2	Celtic	38	24	10	4	101	34	+67	58
3	Motherwell	38	24	8	6	102	42	+60	56
4	Partick Thistle	38	24	5	9	76	43	+33	53
5	Heart of Midlothian	38	19	6	13	90	63	+27	44
6	Aberdeen	38	17	7	14	79	63	+16	41
7	Cowdenbeath	38	17	7	14	58	65	−7	41
8	Dundee	38	17	5	16	65	63	+2	39
9	Airdrieonians	38	17	5	16	59	66	−7	39
10	Hamilton Academical	38	16	5	17	59	57	+2	37
11	Kilmarnock	38	15	5	18	59	60	−1	35
12	Clyde	38	15	4	19	60	87	−27	34
13	Queen's Park	38	13	7	18	71	72	−1	33
14	Falkirk	38	14	4	20	77	87	−10	32
15	St Mirren	38	11	8	19	49	72	−23	30
16	Morton	38	11	7	20	58	83	−25	29
17	Leith Athletic	38	8	11	19	51	85	−34	27
18	Ayr United	38	8	11	19	53	92	−39	27
19	Hibernian	38	9	7	22	49	81	−32	25
20	East Fife	38	8	4	26	45	113	−68	20

Source: "1930-1931 Division 1 - SPFL Archive". SPFL.

Champions: Rangers
Relegated: Hibernian, East Fife

== Scottish League Division Two ==
Pos	Team	Pld	W	D	L	GF	GA	GD	Pts	Promotion or relegation
1	Third Lanark	38	27	7	4	107	42	+65	61	Promotion to the 1931–32 First Division
2	Dundee United	38	21	8	9	93	54	+39	50	Promotion to the 1931–32 First Division
3	Dunfermline Athletic	38	20	7	11	83	50	+33	47	
4	Raith Rovers	38	20	6	12	93	72	+21	46	
5	St Johnstone	38	19	6	13	76	61	+15	44	
6	Queen of the South	38	18	6	14	83	66	+17	42	
7	East Stirlingshire	38	17	7	14	85	74	+11	41	
8	Montrose	38	19	3	16	75	90	−15	41	
9	Albion Rovers	38	14	11	13	83	84	−1	39	
10	Dumbarton	38	15	8	15	73	72	+1	38	
11	St Bernard's	38	14	9	15	85	66	+19	37	
12	Forfar Athletic	38	15	6	17	80	84	−4	36	
13	Alloa Athletic	38	15	5	18	65	87	−22	35	
14	King's Park	38	14	6	18	78	70	+8	34	
15	Arbroath	38	15	4	19	83	94	−11	34	
16	Brechin City	38	13	7	18	52	84	−32	33	
17	Stenhousemuir	38	12	6	20	75	101	−26	30	
18	Armadale	38	13	2	23	74	99	−25	28	
19	Clydebank	38	10	2	26	61	108	−47	22	Left the League
20	Bo'ness	38	9	4	25	54	100	−46	22	

Promoted: Third Lanark, Dundee United

== Scottish Cup ==
Celtic were winners of the Scottish Cup after a 4–2 replay win over Motherwell.

== Other honours ==
=== National ===
Competition	Winner	Score	Runner-up
Scottish Qualifying Cup	Bathgate	1–0	Dalbeattie Star

=== County ===
Competition	Winner	Score	Runner-up
Aberdeenshire Cup	Aberdeen	7–1 *	Peterhead
Ayrshire Cup	Kilmarnock	5–1	Beith
Dumbartonshire Cup	Dumbarton	5–0	Clydebank
East of Scotland Shield	Hearts	5–4	Hibernian
Fife Cup	East Fife	2–2	Raith Rovers
Forfarshire Cup	Forfar Athletic	2–1	Dundee
Glasgow Cup	Celtic	2–1	Rangers
Lanarkshire Cup	Airdrie	6–2 *	Albion Rovers
Perthshire Cup	St Johnstone	4–2	Vale of Atholl
Renfrewshire Cup	Morton	5–4 *	St Mirren
Southern Counties Cup	Dalbeattie Star	1–0	Stranraer
Stirlingshire Cup	Falkirk	2–0	Stenhousemuir

^{*} – aggregate over two legs

=== Highland League ===
Top Three
Pos	Team	Pld	W	D	L	GF	GA	GD	Pts
1	Inverness Caledonian	22	12	8	2	62	36	+26	32
2	Buckie Thistle	22	15	1	6	55	33	+22	31
3	Forres Mechanics	22	10	6	6	55	53	+2	26

== Junior Cup ==
Denny Hibs were winners of the Junior Cup after a 1–0 win over Burnbank Athletic in the final.

== Scotland national team ==
Date	Venue	Opponents	Score	Competition	Scotland scorer(s)
25 October 1930	Ibrox Park, Glasgow (H)	Wales	1–1	BHC	Barney Battles, Jr.
21 February 1931	Windsor Park, Belfast (A)	Ireland	0–0	BHC	
28 March 1931	Hampden Park, Glasgow (H)	England	2–0	BHC	George Stevenson, Jimmy McGrory
16 May 1931	Hohe Warte Stadium Vienna (A)	Austria	0–5	Friendly	
20 May 1931	Stadio Nazionale PNF Rome (A)	Italy	0–3	Friendly	
24 May 1931	Stade des Charmilles Geneva (A)	Switzerland	3–2	Friendly	Jimmy Easson, William Boyd, Andrew Love

Scotland were joint winners with England of the 1930–31 British Home Championship.

Key:

- (H) = Home match
- (A) = Away match
- BHC = British Home Championship
