= 1935–36 British Home Championship =

- The Jubilee Trophy, awarded in 1936 for the first time; it commemorated the Silver Jubilee of George V.

Tournament details
- Host country: England, Ireland, Scotland and Wales
- Dates: 5 October 1935 – 4 April 1936
- Teams: 4

Final positions
- Champions: Scotland (26th title)
- Runners-up: England

Tournament statistics
- Matches played: 6
- Goals scored: 19 (3.17 per match)
- Top scorer(s): (Wales) Dai Astley (England) Fred Tilson (Scotland) Tommy Walker (Scotland) Dally Duncan (2 each)

The 1935–36 British Home Championship was a football tournament played between the British Home Nations during the 1935–36 season. It was won by Scotland after a close contest between Scotland, Wales and England. England began the tournament the stronger team, with a 3–1 win over Ireland in Belfast while Scotland struggled to a 1–1 draw with Wales. Scotland recovered to beat Ireland in their second match whilst England dropped position after defeat by Wales. Wales and Ireland played a tough, high-scoring game which might have given Wales the title, but was ultimately won by the Irish, whilst Scotland came to London knowing that only a win would be enough to give them the trophy. In a furious attacking game the result; 1–1, was enough to give Scotland an undisputed tournament success. This was the first edition of the tournament in which a trophy was awarded to the winners.

== Table ==
Team	Pld	W	D	L	GF	GA	GD	Pts
Scotland (C)	3	1	2	0	4	3	+1	4
England	3	1	1	1	5	4	+1	3
Wales	3	1	1	1	5	5	0	3
Ireland	3	1	0	2	5	7	−2	2

Rules for classification: 1) points. The points system worked as follows: 2 points for a win and 1 point for a draw.
(C) Champions

== Results ==
5 October 1935

Wales	1–1	Scotland
Phillips 40'		Duncan 34'

Ninian Park, Cardiff
Attendance: 35,004
Referee: Isaac Caswell (England)

19 October 1935

Ireland	1–3	England
Brown 18'		Tilson 66', 69'; Brook 85'

Windsor Park, Belfast

13 November 1935

Scotland	2–1	Ireland
Walker 60'; Duncan 89'		Kelly 49'

Tynecastle Park, Edinburgh
Attendance: 30,000
Referee: Harry Nattrass (England)

5 February 1936

England	1–2	Wales
Bowden 38'		Astley 47'; Jones 67'

Molineux, Wolverhampton

11 March 1936

Ireland	3–2	Wales
Gibb 34'; Stevenson 61'; Kernaghan 80'		Astley 30'; Phillips 43'

Celtic Park, Belfast

4 April 1936

England	1–1	Scotland
Camsell 30'		Walker 77' (pen.)

Wembley Stadium, London
Attendance: 93,267
Referee: William R. Hamilton (Ireland)
