= 1932–33 British Home Championship =

Tournament details
- Host country: England, Ireland, Scotland and Wales
- Dates: 17 September 1932 – 1 April 1933
- Teams: 4

Final positions
- Champions: Wales (5th title)
- Runners-up: Scotland

Tournament statistics
- Matches played: 6
- Goals scored: 20 (3.33 per match)
- Top scorer(s): (Wales) Dai Astley (Scotland) Jimmy McGrory (3 each)

The 1932–33 British Home Championship was a football tournament played between the British Home Nations during the 1932–33 season. It was won by the strong Welsh side which claimed several tournaments during the 1930s, the last undisputed victories Wales would achieve.

The tournament began with victories by both Scotland and England over Ireland, who endured a miserable competition, losing all their games and conceding nine goals. Scotland in particular began well with a 4–0 victory in Belfast. Scotland were however in for a shock in their second game in Edinburgh as they were demolished by a commanding Welsh display, losing 5–2. England by contrast managed to hold the Welsh to a scoreless draw in Wrexham and England and Wales emerged as favourites going into the final matches. Wales maintained their strong run of form, by crushing Ireland 4–1 in their final game, requiring England to beat Scotland in Glasgow to draw for the trophy. This effort proved too much for England, who went down 2–1 to the Scots, who took second place.

== Table ==
Team	Pld	W	D	L	GF	GA	GD	Pts
Wales (C)	3	2	1	0	9	3	+6	5
Scotland	3	2	0	1	8	6	+2	4
England	3	1	1	1	2	2	0	3
Ireland	3	0	0	3	1	9	−8	0

Rules for classification: 1) points. The points system worked as follows: 2 points for a win and 1 point for a draw.
(C) Champions

== Results ==
17 September 1932

Ireland	0–4	Scotland
		King 3'; McPhail 27', 68'; McGrory 76'

Windsor Park, Belfast
Attendance: 40,000
Referee: William Percy Harper (England)

17 October 1932

England	1–0	Ireland
Barclay

Bloomfield Road, Blackpool
Attendance: 23,000
Referee: H Watson (Scotland)

26 October 1932

Scotland	2–5	Wales
Dewar 63'; Duncan 66'		Thomson 10' (o.g.); Griffiths 20'; O'Callaghan 25', 46'; Astley 43'

Tynecastle Park, Edinburgh
Attendance: 31,000
Referee: William Percy Harper (England)

16 November 1932

Wales	0–0	England

Racecourse Ground, Wrexham
Attendance: 25,167
Referee: S Thompson (Ireland)

7 December 1932

Wales	4–1	Ireland
Robbins; Astley		English

Racecourse Ground, Wrexham
Attendance: 8,500
Referee: G Hewitt (England)

1 April 1933

Scotland	2–1	England
McGrory 5', 80'		Hunt 30'

Hampden Park, Glasgow
Attendance: 136,259
Referee: Samuel Thompson (Ireland)
