= 1933–34 British Home Championship =

Tournament details
- Host country: England, Ireland, Scotland and Wales
- Dates: 16 September 1933 – 14 April 1934
- Teams: 4

Final positions
- Champions: Wales (6th title)
- Runners-up: England

Tournament statistics
- Matches played: 6
- Goals scored: 19 (3.17 per match)
- Top scorer(s): (Wales) Dai Astley (Ireland) Boy Martin (2 each)

The 1933–34 British Home Championship was an annual international football tournament played between the British Home Nations during the 1933–34 football season. It was won by Wales, whose run of form during the 1930s was their last sustained period of international success in the team's history. In taking the title they beat both favourites England and the poor Scots, holding Ireland to a score draw. England came second with commanding victories over Scotland and Ireland but suffering defeat to the Welsh on home turf in Newcastle. Ireland also managed victory over the Scots but were well beaten by England and could only draw with Wales to take third place.

== Table ==
| Team | Pld | W | D | L | GF | GA | GD | Pts |
|---|---|---|---|---|---|---|---|---|
| Wales (C) | 3 | 2 | 1 | 0 | 6 | 4 | +2 | 5 |
| England | 3 | 2 | 0 | 1 | 7 | 2 | +5 | 4 |
| Ireland | 3 | 1 | 1 | 1 | 3 | 5 | −2 | 3 |
| Scotland | 3 | 0 | 0 | 3 | 3 | 8 | −5 | 0 |

Rules for classification: 1) points. The points system worked as follows: 2 points for a win and 1 point for a draw.
(C) Champions

== Results ==
16 September 1933

| Scotland | 1–2 | Ireland |
|---|---|---|
| McPhail 84' | | Martin 8', 13' |

Celtic Park, Glasgow
Attendance: 27,135
Referee: Edward Wood (England)

4 October 1933

| Wales | 3–2 | Scotland |
|---|---|---|
| Evans 25'; Robbins 35'; Astley 57' | | McFadyen 75'; Duncan 80' |

Ninian Park, Cardiff
Attendance: 40,000
Referee: Edward Wood (England)

14 October 1933

| Ireland | 0–3 | England |
|---|---|---|
| | | Brook 30'; Grosvenor 51'; Bowers 60' |

Windsor Park, Belfast
Attendance: 40,000
Referee: H Watson (Scotland)

4 November 1933

| Ireland | 1–1 | Wales |
|---|---|---|
| Jones 59' | | Glover 4' |

Windsor Park, Belfast
Attendance: 20,000
Referee: M C Hutton (Scotland)

15 November 1933

| England | 1–2 | Wales |
|---|---|---|
| Brook 59' | | Mills 21'; Astley 82' |

St James' Park, Newcastle
Attendance: 15,000
Referee: S Thompson (Ireland)

14 April 1934

| England | 3–0 | Scotland |
|---|---|---|
| Bastin 43'; Brook 80'; Bowers 88' |

Wembley Stadium, London
Attendance: 92,363
Referee: Samuel Thompson (Ireland)
