= 1936–37 British Home Championship =

Tournament details
- Host country: England, Ireland, Scotland and Wales
- Dates: 17 October 1936 – 17 April 1937
- Teams: 4

Final positions
- Champions: Wales (7th title)
- Runners-up: Scotland

Tournament statistics
- Matches played: 6
- Goals scored: 23 (3.83 per match)
- Top scorer: (Wales) Pat Glover (4)

The 1936–37 British Home Championship was a football tournament played between the British Home Nations during the 1936–37 seasons. The trophy was won by Wales with Scotland coming second. This was the last Home Championship that Wales would win exclusively. Every subsequent victory would be shared with one of the other Home Nations. Wales began the competition by beating England and followed it with a similar 2–1 victory against Scotland. With the two favourites beaten Wales only required a draw with Ireland to complete a rare tournament success. They ultimately took the title in style, winning 4–1 at home. Scotland recovered from their loss to Wales in their final game with a commanding 3–1 victory over England in Glasgow to come second, whilst England's only points came from their own 3–1 defeat of the disappointing Irish.

The Scotland–England tie recorded a massive attendance of 149,547, despite the fact that Wales had already won the Championship. Attendance was boosted by the fact that the game was not on the radio due to a disagreement between the Scottish FA and the BBC. The crowd was the fifth-largest for any competitive international football match, being beaten by four games at the Maracanã.

== Table ==
| Team | Pld | W | D | L | GF | GA | GD | Pts |
|---|---|---|---|---|---|---|---|---|
| Wales (C) | 3 | 3 | 0 | 0 | 8 | 3 | +5 | 6 |
| Scotland | 3 | 2 | 0 | 1 | 7 | 4 | +3 | 4 |
| England | 3 | 1 | 0 | 2 | 5 | 6 | −1 | 2 |
| Ireland | 3 | 0 | 0 | 3 | 3 | 10 | −7 | 0 |

Rules for classification: 1) points. The points system worked as follows: 2 points for a win and 1 point for a draw.
(C) Champions

== Results ==
17 October 1936

| Wales | 2–1 | England |
|---|---|---|
| S. Morris 64'; Glover 66' | | Bastin 44' |

Ninian Park, Cardiff

31 October 1936

| Ireland | 1–3 | Scotland |
|---|---|---|
| Kernaghan 26' | | Napier 28'; Munro 46'; McCulloch 62' |

Windsor Park, Belfast
Attendance: 45,000
Referee: Thomas J. Thompson (England)

18 November 1936

| England | 3–1 | Ireland |
|---|---|---|
| Carter 30'; Bastin 67'; Worrall 75' | | Davis 43' |

Victoria Ground, Stoke

2 December 1936

| Scotland | 1–2 | Wales |
|---|---|---|
| Walker 57' | | Glover 23', 80' |

Dens Park, Dundee
Attendance: 23,858
Referee: Dr. Arthur W. Barton (England)

17 March 1937

| Wales | 4–1 | Ireland |
|---|---|---|
| Jones 25'; Glover 33', 51'; Warren 65' | | Stevenson 62' |

Racecourse Ground, Wrexham

17 April 1937

| Scotland | 3–1 | England |
|---|---|---|
| O'Donnell 47'; McPhail 80', 89' | | Steele 40' |

Hampden Park, Glasgow
Attendance: 149,547
Referee: William McLean (Ireland)
