= 1934–35 British Home Championship =

Football tournament

Tournament details
- Host country: England, Ireland, Scotland and Wales
- Dates: 29 September 1934 – 6 April 1935
- Teams: 4

Final positions
- Champions: England; Scotland (shared)

Tournament statistics
- Matches played: 6
- Goals scored: 21 (3.5 per match)
- Top scorer: (Scotland) Dally Duncan (3)

The 1934–35 British Home Championship was a football tournament played between the British Home Nations during the 1934–35 season. Scotland and England shared the trophy after a dramatic final match in which the Scots beat England to claim a share of the cup after having seemingly come adrift following their early defeat to Ireland.

It was England and Ireland who began strongest, England thumping the trophy-holders Wales 4–0 in Cardiff whilst the Irish defeated the Scots in Belfast 2–1. Scotland recovered in the second game, beating Wales 3–2 at home to reenter the race for the tournament as England beat Ireland in a close game in Liverpool to become favourites. In the final matches, Ireland failed to take the necessary points from Wales to push for a joint top spot, falling 3–1 in Wrexham; Peco Bauwens became the first foreigner to referee a match in the tournament. The Scots and the English played in Glasgow, knowing that a draw for the English would be enough to secure them an undisputed victory. This was not to be as by dint of great effort, the Scottish team overcame their Southern rivals 2–0. As goal difference was not at this stage used to separate teams in the British Home Championship, the honours were shared by England and Scotland, whilst Ireland and Wales shared third place.

== Table ==
Team	Pld	W	D	L	GF	GA	GD	Pts
England (C)	3	2	0	1	6	3	+3	4
Scotland (C)	3	2	0	1	6	4	+2	4
Ireland	3	1	0	2	4	6	−2	2
Wales	3	1	0	2	5	8	−3	2

Rules for classification: 1) points. The points system worked as follows: 2 points for a win and 1 point for a draw.
(C) Co-champions

== Results ==
29 September 1934

Wales	0–4	England
		Tilson 10', 85'; Brook 30'; Matthews 64'

Ninian Park, Cardiff
Attendance: 36,692
Referee: S. Thompson (Ireland)

20 October 1934

Ireland	2–1	Scotland
Martin 80'; Coulter 90'		Gallacher 40'

Windsor Park, Belfast
Attendance: 39,752
Referee: Henry Norman Mee (England)

21 November 1934

Scotland	3–2	Wales
Duncan 23'; Napier 46', 85'		Phillips 72'; Astley 88'

Pittodrie Stadium, Aberdeen
Attendance: 26,334
Referee: Samuel Thompson (Ireland)

6 February 1935

England	2–1	Ireland
Bastin 21', 70'		Stevenson 50'

Goodison Park, Liverpool
Attendance: 32,000
Referee: W. E. Webb (Scotland)

27 March 1935

Wales	3–1	Ireland
Jones 7'; Phillips 23'; Hopkins 85'		Bambrick 22'

Racecourse Ground, Wrexham
Attendance: 16,000
Referee: Peco Bauwens (Nazi Germany)

6 April 1935

Scotland	2–0	England
Duncan 44', 51'

Hampden Park, Glasgow
Attendance: 129,693
Referee: Thomas Thompson (Ireland)
