= 1930–31 British Home Championship =

Tournament details
- Host country: England, Ireland, Scotland and Wales
- Dates: 20 October 1930 – 22 April 1931
- Teams: 4

Final positions
- Champions: England; Scotland (shared)

Tournament statistics
- Matches played: 6
- Goals scored: 19 (3.17 per match)
- Top scorer: (England) Jimmy Hampson (3)

The 1930–31 British Home Championship was a football tournament played between the British Home Nations during the 1930–31 season. The trophy was shared between England and Scotland as at the time a win was only worth two points and a draw one. Thus, despite England's dominance of the opening matches, their defeat to Scotland in the final game gave the Scots a share in the victory even though it was the only game they won.

England began the tournament in commanding fashion, with heavy defeats of Ireland and Wales in their opening matches. Scotland by contrast struggled, only managing draws with both opponents and coming close to being upset in both matches. Going into the final match, England were already assured of a winners position, and only needed to draw with Scotland to take the position unopposed. However this proved beyond them as the Scots ran out 2–0 winners in Glasgow. In the competition's final match, Wales and Ireland fought a furious battle for third place, with the Welsh just edging the victory 3–2.

== Table ==
Team	Pld	W	D	L	GF	GA	GD	Pts
England (C)	3	2	0	1	9	3	+6	4
Scotland (C)	3	1	2	0	3	1	+2	4
Wales	3	1	1	1	4	7	−3	3
Ireland	3	0	1	2	3	8	−5	1

Rules for classification: 1) points. The points system worked as follows: 2 points for a win and 1 point for a draw.
(C) Co-champions

== Results ==
20 October 1930

England	5–1	Ireland
Burgess; Hampson; Crooks; Houghton		Dunne

Bramall Lane, Sheffield

25 October 1930

Scotland	1–1	Wales
Battles Jr. 43'		Bamford 6'

Ibrox Park, Glasgow
Attendance: 23,106
Referee: Charles E. Lines (England)

22 November 1930

Wales	0–4	England
		Hampson; Hodgson; Bradford

Racecourse Ground, Wrexham

21 February 1931

Ireland	0–0	Scotland

Windsor Park, Belfast
Attendance: 27,000
Referee: Herbert Edward Hull (England)

28 March 1931

Scotland	2–0	England
Stevenson 61'; McGrory 64'

Hampden Park, Glasgow
Attendance: 131,273
Referee: Alfred James Atwood (Wales)

22 April 1931

Wales	3–2	Ireland
Phillips; Griffiths; Warren		Dunne; Rowley

Racecourse Ground, Wrexham
