= Tynecastle Park =

Football stadium in Edinburgh, Scotland

- Tynie
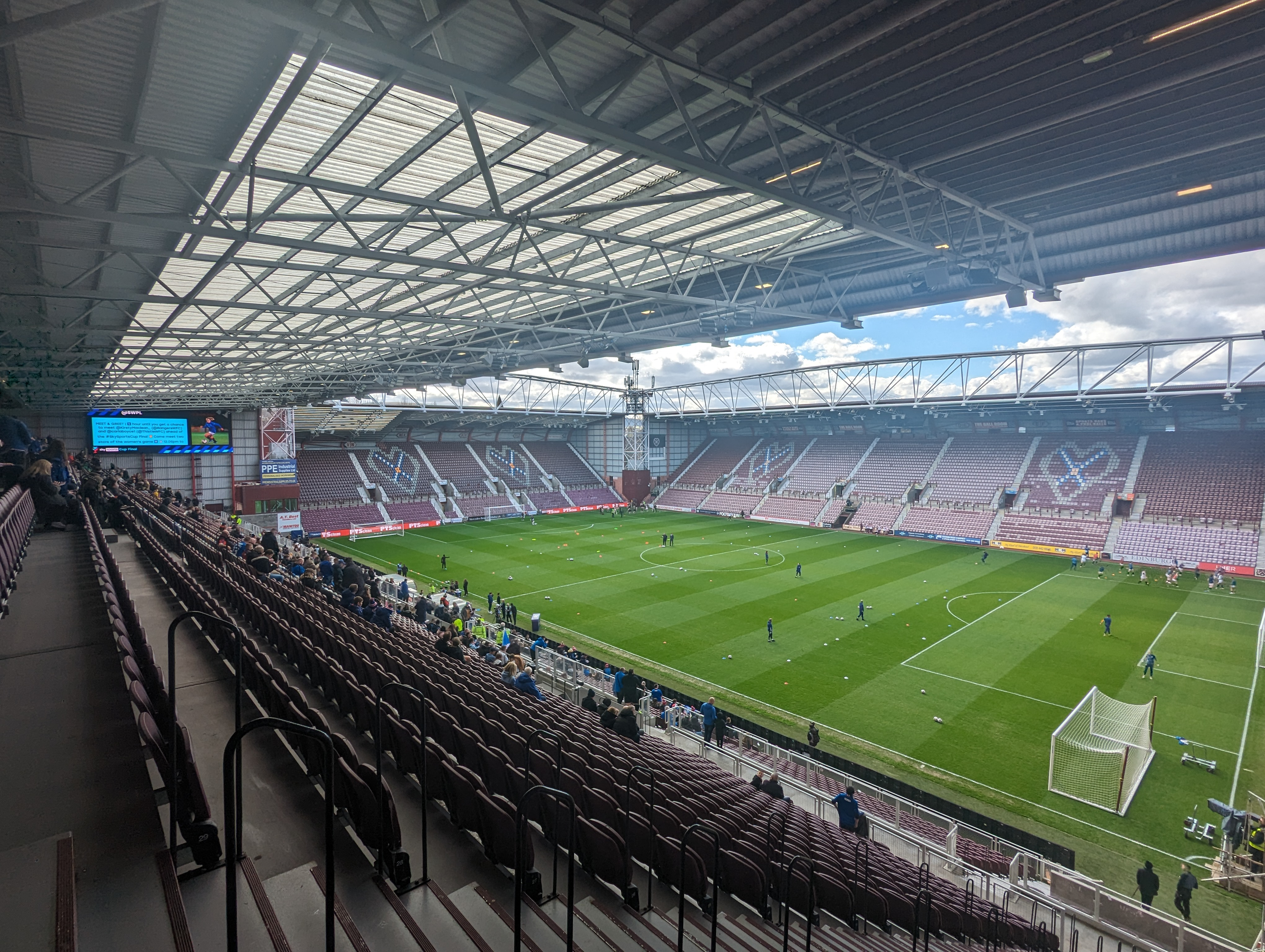
- Interior of Tynecastle in 2024; UEFA

- Location in Edinburgh
- Former names: Tynecastle Stadium (c. 1996–2017)
- Location: Gorgie, Edinburgh, Scotland
- Coordinates: 55°56′21″N 3°13′56″W
- Owner: Heart of Midlothian F.C.
- Capacity: 19,852
- Surface: Hybrid

Construction
- Opened: 10 April 1886
- Renovated: 1994–1997, 2017
- Architect: Jim Clydesdale

Tenant
- Heart of Midlothian F.C.: 1886–present

Tynecastle Park, also known as Tynecastle Stadium or colloquially as Tynie, is a football stadium in the Gorgie area of Edinburgh, which is the home ground of Scottish Professional Football League club Heart of Midlothian (Hearts). A UEFA category four stadium, it has also hosted Scotland international matches, and been used as a neutral venue for Scottish Cup and Scottish League Cup semi-finals.

Tynecastle has a seating capacity of 19,852, which makes it the sixth-largest football stadium in Scotland. Hearts have played at the present site of Tynecastle since 1886.

== History ==
=== Heart of Midlothian ===
After Hearts was formed in 1874, the club played at sites in the Meadows, Powburn and Powderhall. Hearts first moved to the Gorgie area, in the west of Edinburgh, in 1881. This pitch, known as "Tynecastle Park" or "Old Tynecastle", stood on the site of the present-day Wardlaw Street and Wardlaw Terrace. As this site was then regarded as being 'out of town', Hearts would sometimes stage two matches for the price of one, or set an admission price much lower than Edinburgh derby rivals Hibs. In 1886, with the city continuing to expand, tenements replaced the old ground and Hearts moved across Gorgie Road to the present site (also known as "Tynecastle Park", or "New Tynecastle"), which was leased from Edinburgh Corporation. Hearts played a friendly against Bolton Wanderers to inaugurate their new home on 10 April 1886. Tynecastle staged its first Scottish Football League match on 23 August 1890, when Hearts lost 5–0 to Celtic.

Hearts won the Scottish Cup in 1891, which provided the club with sufficient finances for a new clubhouse. Tynecastle hosted its first international fixture in 1892, a 6–1 victory for Scotland against Wales. Only 1,200 fans attended the match because a snowstorm had led many fans to assume that it would be postponed. 1892 also saw a roof constructed on the original "South" stand. In 1895 Tynecastle hosted a "World Championship" match between the winner of the English Football League First Division, Sunderland, and the Scottish league champions, Hearts. The trophy was won by Sunderland, who beat Hearts by a 5–3 score. Tynecastle hosted another "World Championship" game in 1902, when Hearts beat Tottenham Hotspur 3–1.

=== Redevelopment ===
Tynecastle underwent substantial changes in the early twentieth century. A small stand and pavilion were built in 1903. The banks of terracing were greatly increased in 1906, giving a total capacity of 61,784. In 1911, a covered enclosure was erected on the western "distillery" side. The two old stands and pavilion were replaced in 1914 by a pitch-length grandstand (the present Main Stand), designed by the stadium architect Archibald Leitch. To partly fund the cost of the new stand, Hearts sold Percy Dawson to Blackburn Rovers for a British record transfer fee of £2,500. A number of items were omitted from the first estimate of the stand, which meant that its cost doubled to £12,000.

Hearts purchased the ground in 1926. Over the next four years, the terraces were expanded using ash from the nearby Haymarket railway yards. In 1927, Hearts gave the BBC permission to begin radio commentaries from the ground. New turnstiles were built on Wheatfield Street and subways created to allow access to the terraces. Tynecastle's record attendance was achieved in 1932, when 53,396 attended a Scottish Cup tie against Rangers. Tynecastle was now tightly squeezed on three sides, however, by narrow streets, Tynecastle High School and bonded warehouses of the North British Distillery. Hearts considered moving to Murrayfield Stadium, which had opened in 1925. There was also a proposal to move to a new ground in Sighthill. The start of the Second World War halted these schemes, however.

The terraces were concreted in 1951 and Tynecastle became Scotland's first all-concrete stadium in 1954. Following the modernisation of the stadium, the club architects said that the capacity stood at 54,359, but for safety reasons only 49,000 tickets were printed and sold for big matches. Floodlights were installed at Tynecastle in 1957. A roof was constructed along part of the "distillery" side and in the north-west corner of the ground in 1959. This work was paid for by the sale of Dave Mackay for £32,000 to Tottenham Hotspur.

No further changes were made to Tynecastle until stricter ground safety regulations came into effect in the 1970s. Hearts also lacked the finances to redevelop Tynecastle, as the club were relegated from the Premier Division twice in five seasons in the late 1970s and early 1980s. Hearts began to perform better under the ownership of Wallace Mercer, who took control in 1981. The capacity was cut to 29,000 with the installation of benches on the "distillery" covered terrace and in the Main Stand paddock in 1982 and 1985 respectively. Also around this time, lounges and facilities were installed in the Main Stand.

=== Safety upgrades ===
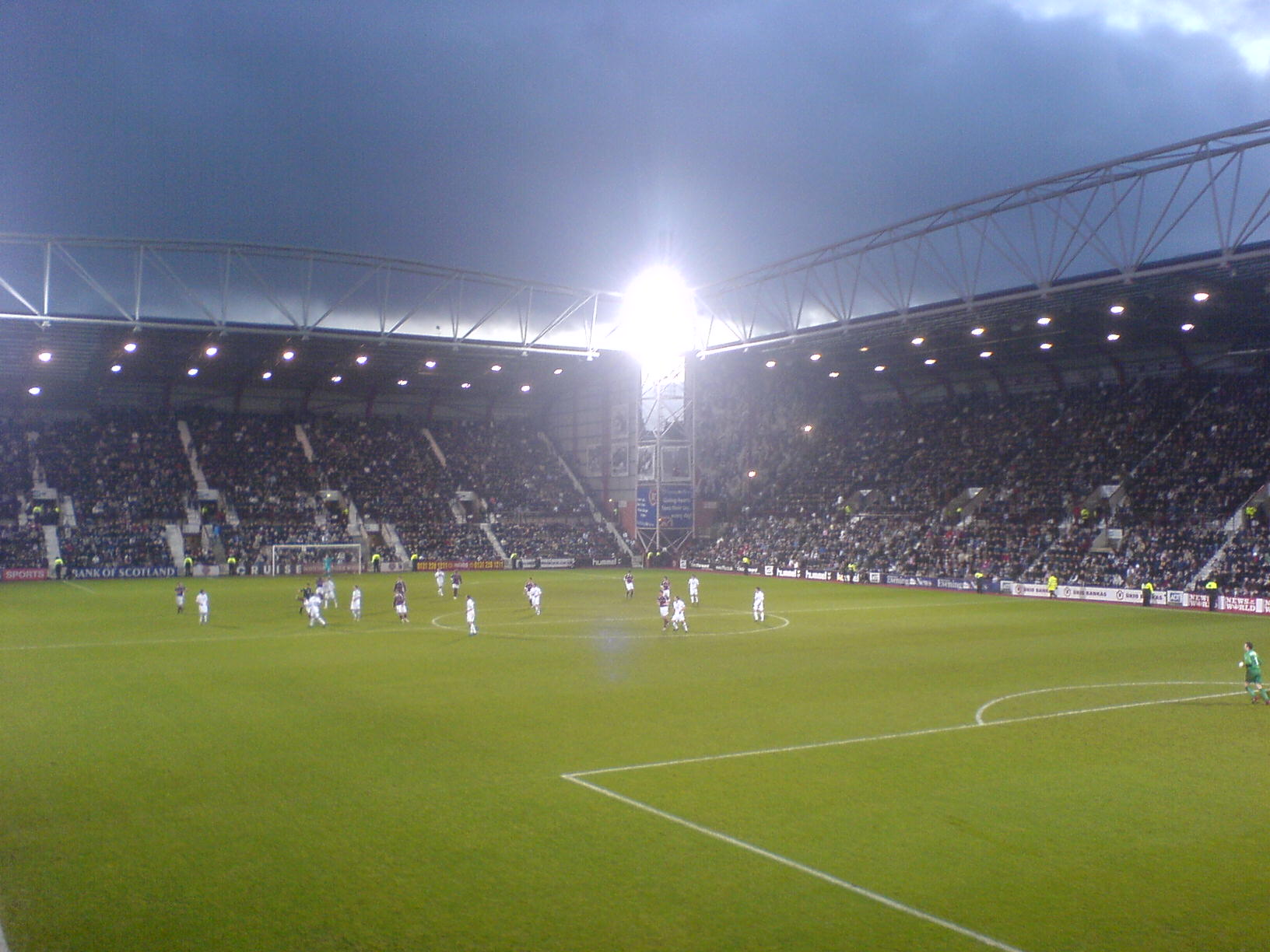
The Gorgie and Wheatfield stands at dusk

The Taylor Report required all major sports grounds to become all-seated by August 1994. Hearts initially entered discussions with Hibernian and the local authorities, but none of the sites suggested were suitable for all parties. In March 1991, Hearts submitted their own proposal for a 30,000 all-seat stadium at Millerhill, in the south-east of Edinburgh. The development would have also incorporated offices, a hotel, supermarket, restaurants and a business park. The site was in the Edinburgh green belt, however, and the proposal was rejected later in 1991. Hermiston was then suggested as a possible site for a new Hearts stadium, but this fell through in December 1992 as it was also within the green belt area.

The collapse of the Hermiston proposal forced Hearts to redevelop Tynecastle instead. In 1994, the entire western and northern sides of the ground were demolished, allowing for the construction of the Wheatfield Stand that year and the Roseburn Stand the following year. Temporary 'bucket' seating was installed on the (southern) Gorgie Road end terracing. That terracing was itself razed in 1997 and replaced by the Gorgie Stand. During this period of redevelopment, the ground was officially renamed as Tynecastle Stadium.

=== Sale and Hearts ownership ===
In 2004, then club CEO Chris Robinson announced plans to sell Tynecastle, which he claimed was "not fit for purpose". Hearts would have rented Murrayfield from the SRU instead. The prime motivation for this move was to eradicate the club's debt of nearly £20 million. The plan was almost universally unpopular with supporters, and a campaign, entitled "Save Our Hearts", was set up to try to block the move. In spite of this, Robinson and those supporting his actions controlled a slender majority of the issued shares and it appeared that a sale would be completed, particularly after a deal was preliminarily agreed to sell the site for just over £20 million to Cala Homes, a property development company.

The sale was cancelled, however, when Vladimir Romanov purchased the club in January 2005, invoking a clause in the initial agreement that allowed for its annulment upon the payment of a fixed sum of £75,000. Later in 2005, the pitch dimensions were altered to meet UEFA standards, necessitating the removal of the lowest rows of seating in the Gorgie and Roseburn Stands. As a result, the overall capacity was reduced from 18,000 to 17,420. On 20 August 2007 the club announced they were "at an advanced stage" in plans for demolishing the aged Main Stand and replacing it with a 10,000 seat stand, including a hotel and leisure facilities. A planning application was lodged with Edinburgh City Council in February 2008. This development would have increased capacity to 23,000, but the proposal did not proceed due to the state of the club's finances.

=== Redevelopment plans ===
The plans for redevelopment of the main stand were rekindled in December 2015, when Hearts owner Ann Budge said work on the new stand would commence as soon as possible. Hearts submitted plans in March 2016 to Edinburgh Council, proposing a new 7,000-seat stand. The plans also include a nursery, alongside space for a club shop, ticket office and admin office. Construction began during the latter part of the 2016–17 season. In April, Hearts announced their intention to restore the original name of Tynecastle Park when the new stand is opened. The project was initially expected to be completed by September 2017, but construction delays meant that four home fixtures had to be moved to Murrayfield. Tynecastle re-opened on 19 November, for a league game against Partick Thistle.

== Structure and facilities ==
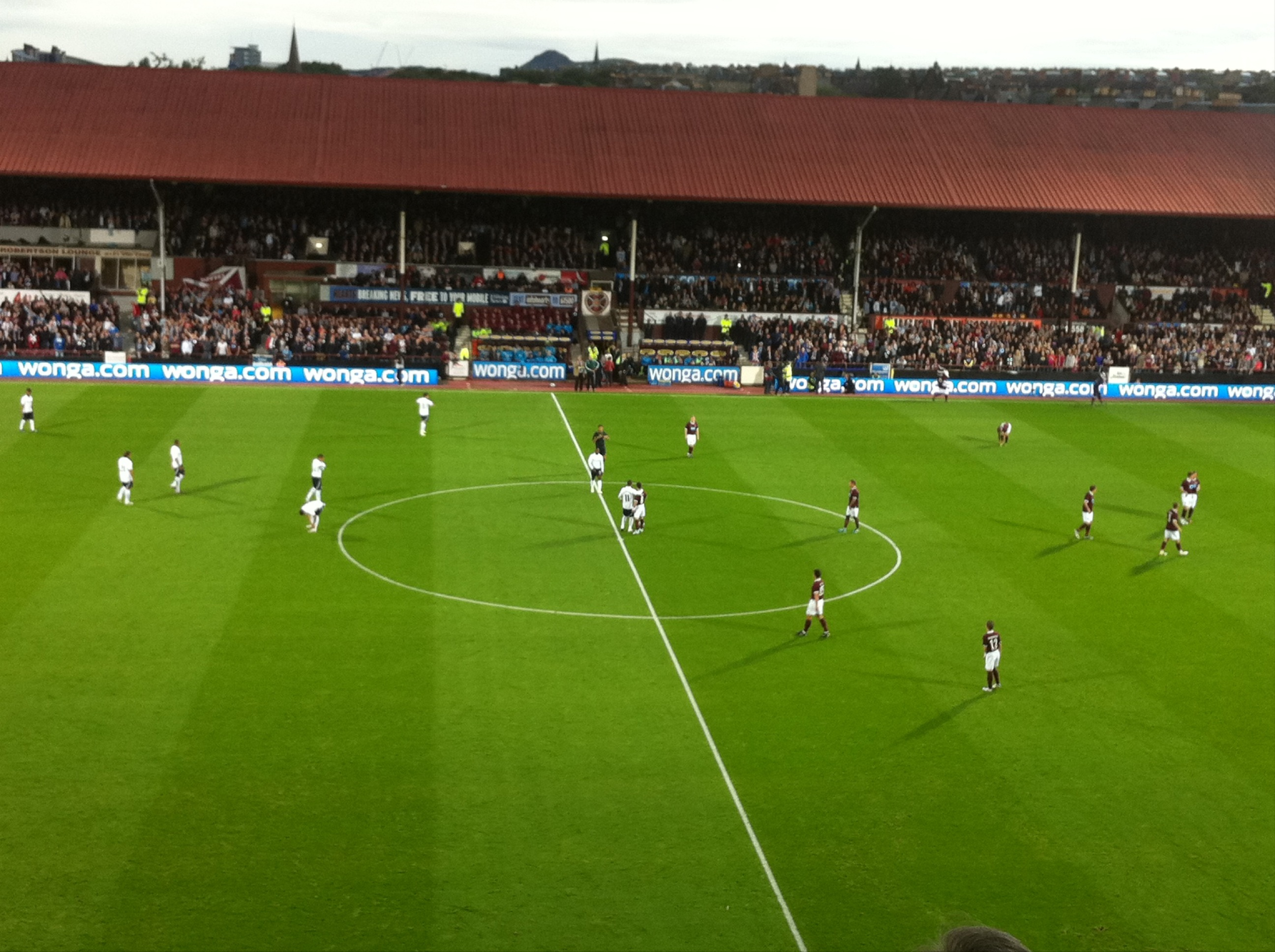
The Archibald Leitch designed Main Stand, demolished in 2017

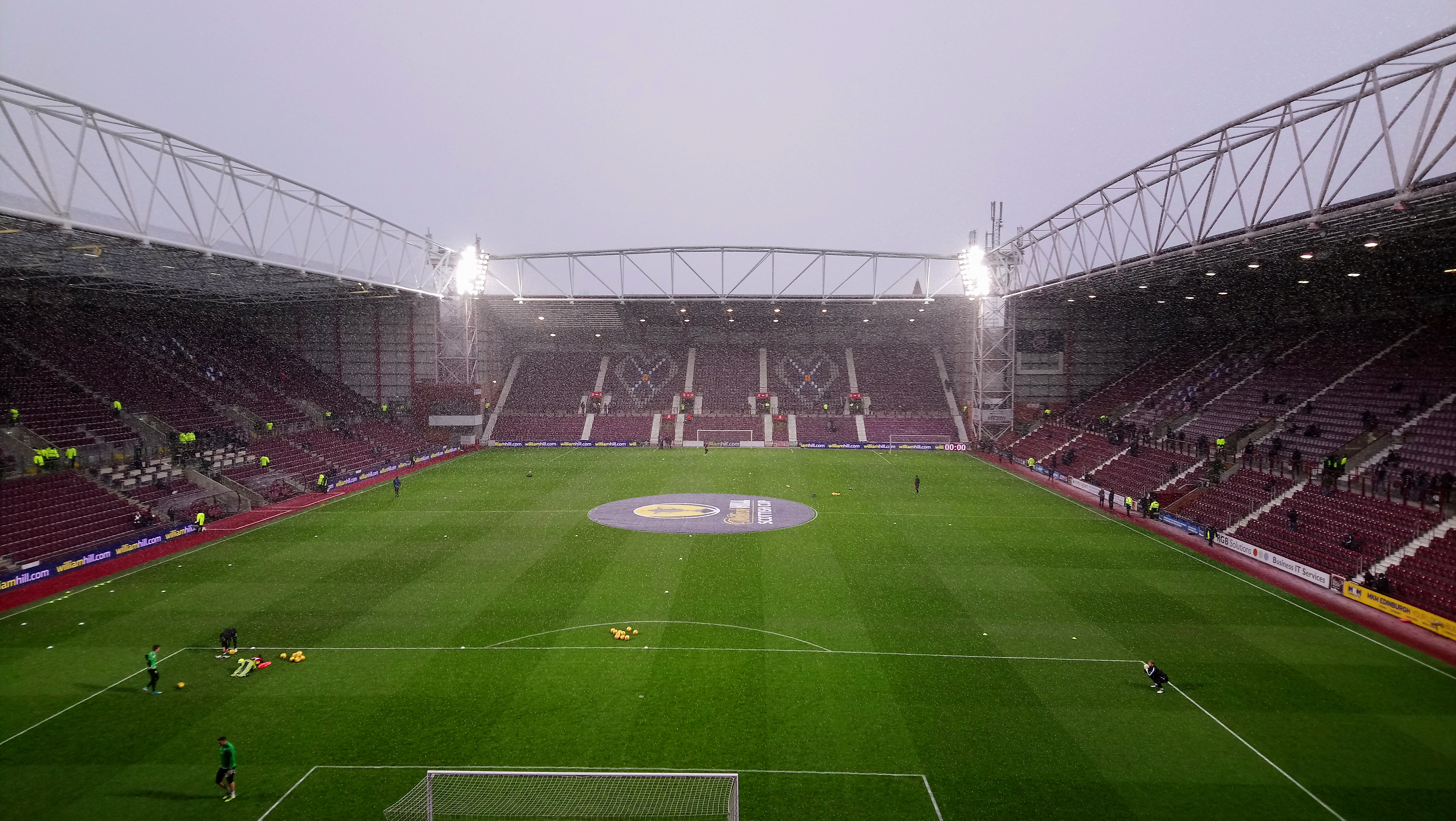
View of Tynecastle Park, looking towards the Gorgie Stand (January 2018)

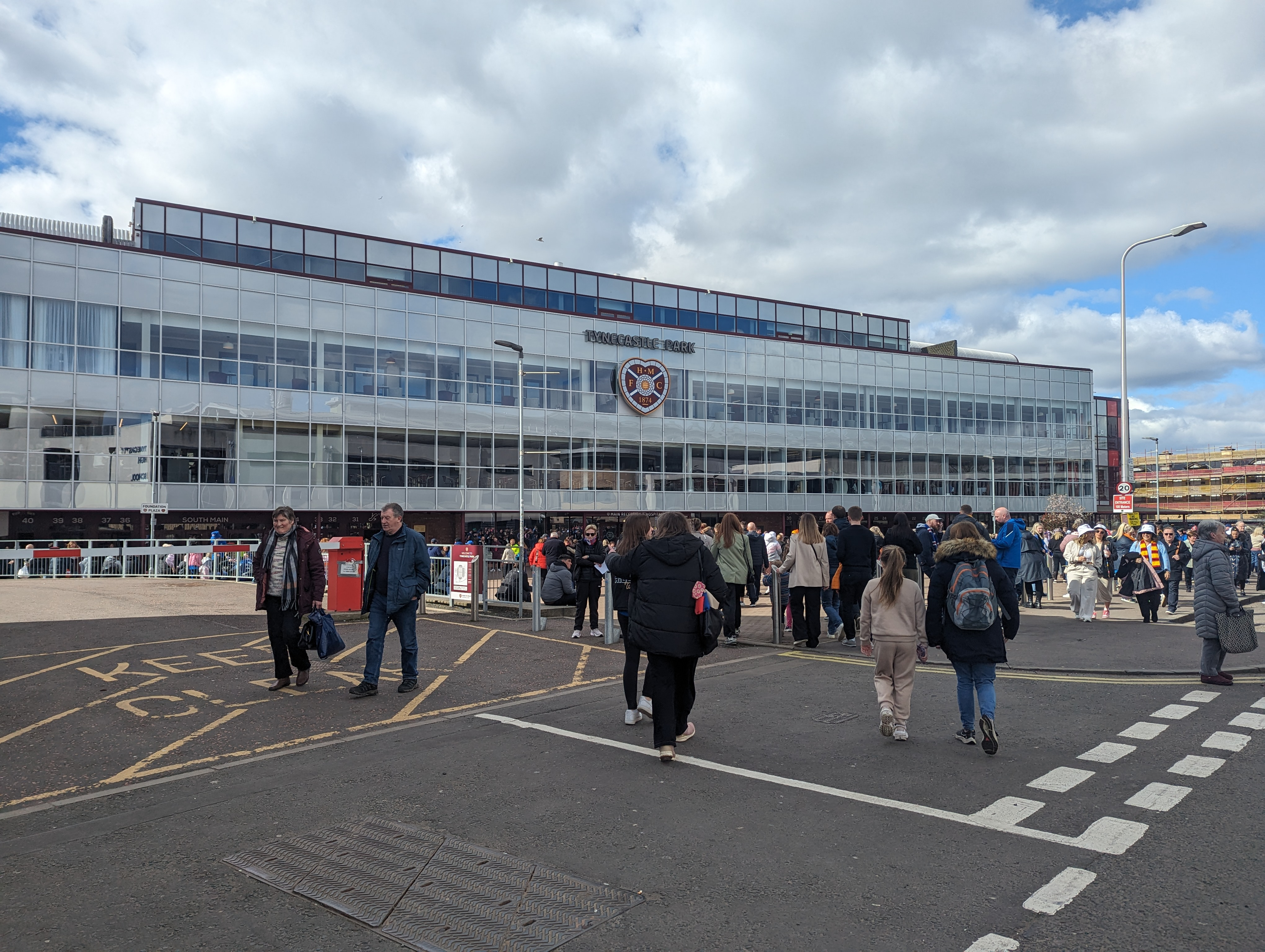
Stadium exterior in 2024

Tynecastle is an all-seated stadium, split into four sections known as the Gorgie Stand, Main Stand, Wheatfield Stand and Roseburn Stand. The Main Stand was rebuilt in 2017, replacing an older facility designed by noted football stadium architect Archibald Leitch. The three other stands were constructed between 1994 and 1997, with all having a distinctive goalpost roof structure made out of steel tubes. Unusually, the framework sits at the front of each stand, which means that the support towers sit within 10 yards of the corner flag, forming an arch over the stand. The stadium floodlights sit on top of the support towers, angled down towards the pitch, like the lighting rigs used at concerts. The Wheatfield Stand, which seats just under 6,000 people, slopes at just under 34 degrees, the maximum angle permitted. The Roseburn Stand (School End) was completed in August 1995 and cost £1.4 million to build. The Roseburn Stand seated 3,676 when it was opened, but 280 seats were removed from both it and the Gorgie Stand when the pitch was lengthened in 2005 to meet UEFA requirements. The Gorgie Stand, which was completed in September 1997, contains the Gorgie Suite.

== Other uses ==
=== Other football matches ===
Tynecastle has been a home venue for the Scotland national football team on nine occasions. It regularly played host to the British Home Championship match with Wales, which was considered to have the least box-office potential and was often played outside Glasgow. After the Second World War, however, the Scottish Football Association favoured playing all home matches at Hampden Park, unless exceptional circumstances prevented Scotland playing there. More recently, Tynecastle has become the home of the Scotland women's national football team.

Tynecastle has been used as a neutral venue for domestic cup semi-finals on numerous occasions, most frequently when these games involve teams from the east or north-east of Scotland (such as Aberdeen, Dundee United or Hibernian). At one stage during the 1920s, Tynecastle hosted a Scottish Cup semi-final in four consecutive years. In total 19 Scottish Cup semi-finals (not including replays) and 11 League Cup semi-finals have been staged at the ground.

However, since the advent of regular live television coverage caused semi-finals to be played at different times, it has been SFA policy to stage both Scottish Cup semi-finals at Hampden, where possible. League Cup semi-finals are still staged at smaller venues depending upon the participants. The last Scottish Cup semi-final hosted at Tynecastle was Aberdeen's defeat of Hibernian in 1992–93. The most recent League Cup semi-final was in 2015–16, when Hibernian won 2–1 against St Johnstone.

Tynecastle was a venue when Scotland hosted the 1989 FIFA U-16 World Championship. Initial group-stage matches were sparsely attended, however, on 20 June 1989, 28,555 spectators watched Scotland defeat a Portugal side containing Rui Costa and Luís Figo 1–0 in the semi-final. Scotland went on to lose the final to Saudi Arabia.

==== Full internationals ====
| 26 March 1892 | Scotland | 6 – 1 | Wales | 1892 British Home Championship |
| | Thomson 1'; Hamilton 8', 65'; McPherson 15', 44'; Baird 55' | | B Lewis | Attendance: 1,200; Referee: J. Reid (Ireland) |

| 3 March 1906 | Scotland | 0 – 2 | Wales | 1906 British Home Championship |
| | | | W Jones 50'; JL Jones 65' | Attendance: 25,000; Referee: J. Lewis (England) |

| 2 March 1912 | Scotland | 1 – 0 | Wales | 1912 British Home Championship |
| | Quinn 88' | | | Attendance: 31,000; Referee: J. Mason (England) |

| 14 February 1925 | Scotland | 3 – 1 | Wales | 1925 British Home Championship |
| | Meiklejohn 9'; Gallacher 20', 61' | | Williams | Attendance: 25,000; Referee: A. Ward (England) |

| 26 October 1932 | Scotland | 2 – 5 | Wales | 1932 British Home Championship |
| | Dewar 63'; Duncan 66' | | Thomson (o.g.); Griffiths; O'Callaghan; Astley | Attendance: 31,000; Referee: P. Harper (England) |

| 13 November 1935 | Scotland | 2 – 1 | Ireland | 1935 British Home Championship |
| | Walker 60'; Duncan 89' | | Kelly | Attendance: 30,000; Referee: H. Nattrass (England) |

| 9 November 1938 | Scotland | 3 – 2 | Wales | 1938 British Home Championship |
| | Gillick 30'; Walker 83', 84' | | Astley; Jones | Attendance: 34,800; Referee: T.J. Thompson (England) |

| 10 October 1998 | Scotland | 3 – 2 | Estonia | UEFA Euro 2000 qualification |
| | Dodds 70', 85'; Hohlov-Simson 79' (o.g.) | Report | Hohlov-Simson 34'; Smirnov 76' | Attendance: 16,930; Referee: Bento Marques (Portugal) |

| 27 May 2003 | Scotland | 1 – 1 | New Zealand | International Friendly |
| | Crawford 11' | Report | Nelsen 47' | Attendance: 10,016; Referee: Ingvarsson (Sweden) |

=== Rugby league ===
The Gorgie ground has also hosted rugby league matches on four occasions. The first, in 1911, was an Ashes match between Great Britain and Australia, during the 1911–12 Kangaroo tour, and ended in an 11–11 draw. The next came eight decades later with the newly created Super League again attempting to promote the sport in Scotland, moved two league fixtures to Tynecastle. The 1998 meeting between London Broncos and Bradford Bulls drawing over 7,000 fans, and the 1999 fixture between Gateshead Thunder and Wigan Warriors before a smaller crowd. The final and most recent came during the Rugby League World Cup between Scotland and Samoa, which the Samoans won 20–12.

=== Music ===
On 2 August 2019, Tynecastle Park hosted the opening event of the 2019 Edinburgh International Festival. The Los Angeles Philharmonic led by Gustavo Dudamel played a selection of Hollywood film scores, including Jurassic Park, Star Wars, E.T. and Jaws. Over 15,000 free tickets were issued and the concert was live-streamed on Facebook, and broadcast on Classic FM.

=== Theatre ===
The stage play Sweet F.A., which dramatized the real-life women's association football club formed during World War I by North British Rubber Co. workers in its Fountainbridge factory, was performed at the 2021 Edinburgh Festival Fringe festival on a stage built on the stadium's main stand, with the pitch as its backdrop.

== See also ==
- List of stadiums in the United Kingdom by capacity
- Lists of stadiums
