= Bob McPhail =

Scottish footballer (1905–2000)

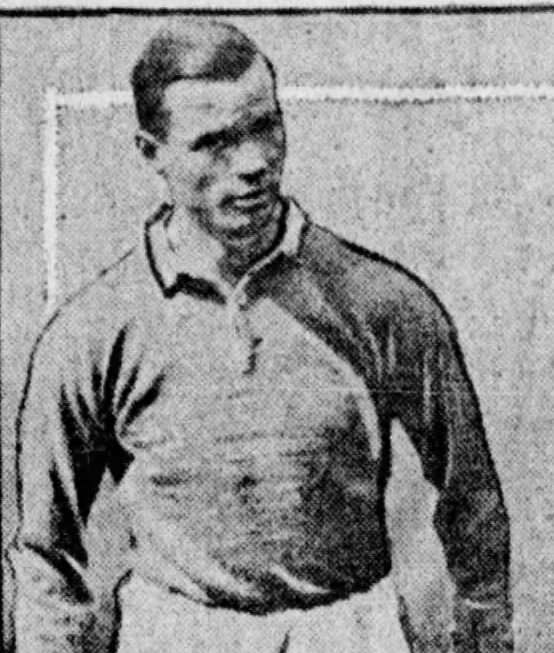
- McPhail in Rangers kit, c. 1928

Personal information
- Full name: Robert Lowe McPhail
- Date of birth: 25 October 1905
- Place of birth: Barrhead, Scotland
- Date of death: 24 August 2000 (aged 94)
- Place of death: Netherlee, Scotland
- Position: Inside left

Senior career*
| Years | Team | Apps | (Gls) |
- Pollok
| 1923–1927 | Airdrieonians | 114 | (75) |
| 1927–1940 | Rangers | 354 | (230) |

International career
| 1926–1936 | Scottish League XI | 6 | (5) |
| 1927–1937 | Scotland | 17 | (7) |
- * Club domestic league appearances and goals

Robert Lowe McPhail (25 October 1905 – 24 August 2000) was a Scottish footballer who played as an inside-left for Airdrieonians, Rangers and the Scotland national team.

== Career ==
=== Airdrieonians ===
Born on 25 October 1905, in Barrhead, McPhail started his career at Glasgow Junior side Pollok. He signed for Airdrieonians in 1923, forming a potent partnership with Hughie Gallacher at Broomfield Park. They won the Scottish Cup in 1924 when McPhail was aged 18, beating Hibernian 2–0. McPhail said, "The terror-like attitude of Gallacher caused havoc with the Hibs defenders. He and Russell were easily our best forwards" (Willie Russell scored both goals). He later attested that the Airdrie team of that time were as good as any he played in subsequently.

=== Rangers ===
McPhail was signed by Rangers in 1927 for a then substantial fee of £5,000 and went on to become one of the most prolific strikers ever to play for the club, scoring 261 goals in 408 appearances. He made his first appearance on 13 August 1927 in a 3–2 win over Aberdeen at Pittodrie. He netted his first goals on 3 September 1927, a double in a 5–1 win over St Johnstone at Ibrox. Rangers won both the Scottish Football League title and the Scottish Cup in McPhail's first season with the club and he scored a total of 23 goals in 42 appearances, including a goal in the 4–0 win over Celtic in the 1928 Scottish Cup Final.

McPhail continued to be an important member of the Rangers team in what was a highly successful period for the club. During his 12 years at Ibrox, McPhail won nine League championships and six Scottish Cups – a joint record number of Scottish Cup wins (along with Gers teammate Dougie Gray, and Jimmy McMenemy and Billy McNeill of Celtic). He scored a total of 230 League goals in 354 league appearances for the club, a record which stood for over 50 years before being broken by Ally McCoist in 1997.

=== International ===
McPhail also had a successful Scotland career, winning 17 caps and scoring seven goals, most notably a double in a 3–1 win over England at Hampden on 17 April 1937 in front of a Hampden record crowd of 149,415. He also represented the Scottish League XI six times (five goals) over the course of a decade while playing for both Airdrieonians and Rangers.

== Later life and death ==
During World War II, McPhail was persuaded by his older brother Malcolm (also formerly a footballer, who played mainly for Kilmarnock) to come out of retirement to play for St Mirren in unofficial wartime competitions, playing alongside future Rangers player Jimmy Caskie. He also worked at Weir Group and operated the Rangers reserve team during the conflict, after which he ran an electrical business.

McPhail died on 24 August 2000, aged 94. He was the last surviving member of the Rangers team of the late 1920s / early 1930s.

== International goals ==
Scores and results list Scotland's goal tally first.

| # | Date | Venue | Opponent | Score | Result | Competition |
|---|---|---|---|---|---|---|
| 1 | 19 September 1931 | Ibrox Park, Glasgow | Ireland | 3–1 | 3–1 | BHC |
| 2 | 12 September 1932 | Windsor Park, Belfast | Ireland | 2–0 | 4–0 | BHC |
| 3 | 12 September 1932 | Windsor Park, Belfast | Ireland | 3–0 | 4–0 | BHC |
| 4 | 16 September 1933 | Celtic Park, Glasgow | Ireland | 1–2 | 1–2 | BHC |
| 5 | 17 April 1937 | Hampden Park, Glasgow | England | 2–1 | 3–1 | BHC |
| 6 | 17 April 1937 | Hampden Park, Glasgow | England | 3–1 | 3–1 | BHC |
| 7 | 22 May 1937 | Stadion Sparta-Letna, Prague | Czechoslovakia | 2–1 | 3–1 | Friendly |

== See also ==
- List of footballers in Scotland by number of league goals (200+)
