= Pat Glover =

Welsh footballer (1910–1971)

Personal information
- Full name: Ernest Matthew Glover
- Date of birth: 9 September 1910
- Place of birth: Swansea, Wales
- Date of death: 9 September 1971 (aged 61)
- Place of death: Tamerton Foliot, England
- Height: 1.83 m (6 ft 0 in)
- Position: Centre forward

Senior career*
| Years | Team | Apps | (Gls) |
| 1928–1929 | Swansea Town | 0 | (0) |
| 1929–1939 | Grimsby Town | 227 | (180) |
| 1939–1940 | Plymouth Argyle | 3 | (1) |

International career
| 1931–1939 | Wales | 7 | (7) |
- * Club domestic league appearances and goals

Ernest Matthew "Pat" Glover (9 September 1910 – 9 September 1971) was a Welsh international footballer who played as a centre forward. He played in the Football League for Grimsby Town and Plymouth Argyle, and was capped seven times by the Wales national team.

== Life and career ==
Born in Swansea, Glover began playing football for The Forward Movement, a church group set up to support poor and working-class people. He joined Football League club Swansea Town in 1928, but failed to make a league appearance before moving to Grimsby Town the following year. Over the next decade, Glover scored 180 league goals in 227 games for Grimsby, and won seven international caps for Wales, scoring seven goals. He was the leading goalscorer in the Second Division for the 1933–34 season with 42, and also received a Second Division winners medal at the end of the campaign as Grimsby were promoted to the First Division. Glover remains Grimsby's all-time highest scorer.

Glover was transferred to Second Division club Plymouth Argyle in 1939, along with teammate Cyril Lewis, and made three appearances at the start of the 1939–40 season before it was abandoned due to the Second World War. He continued to play for the club in the South West Regional League until January 1940, scoring five goals in six matches, and played for Wales in a wartime international before joining the Police War Reserve. Glover became a publican in Tamerton Foliot in 1945, and continued to live there until his death on 9 September 1971, which was his 61st birthday.
