= Charlie Phillips (footballer) =

Welsh footballer

Personal information
- Full name: Cuthbert Phillips
- Date of birth: 23 June 1910
- Place of birth: Victoria, Ebbw Vale, Wales
- Date of death: 15 October 1969 (aged 59)
- Place of death: Lichfield, England
- Height: 5 ft 8 in (1.73 m)
- Position: Forward

Senior career*
Years	Team	Apps	(Gls)
192?–1929	Ebbw Vale		
1929–1936	Wolverhampton Wanderers	191	(59)
1936–1938	Aston Villa	22	(5)
1938–1939	Birmingham	24	(9)
1939	Chelmsford City	4	(2)
1939	Bath City		

International career
1931–1937	Wales	13	(5)
- * Club domestic league appearances and goals

Cuthbert Phillips (23 June 1910 – 15 October 1969), known as Charlie Phillips, was a professional footballer who won 13 full caps for Wales. At club level, he scored 73 goals in 237 appearances in the Football League playing for Wolverhampton Wanderers, Aston Villa and Birmingham.

Phillips was born in Victoria, Newport, which was then in Monmouthshire. He began his football career with Ebbw Vale before turning professional with Wolverhampton Wanderers of the Football League Second Division in 1929. He made his debut for the club on 15 March 1930 in a 1–1 home draw with Oldham Athletic, and went on to play 202 games in all competitions, scoring 65 goals. He contributed to the club's Second Division title in the 1931–32 season, and scored in the 4–2 victory over Everton in the last match of the following season, a game Wolves had to win to remain in the First Division.

In January 1936, Phillips moved on to Aston Villa for a fee of £9,000, where he experienced relegation followed by another Second Division title, and in 1938 he crossed the city to join Birmingham, where he was again relegated from the First Division. In the 1939 close season he dropped into non-league football with Chelmsford City. Phillips played in Chelmsford's opening four games of the season, scoring twice, before moving onto Bath City in October 1939. Phillips subsequently retired from football during the Second World War.

Phillips was capped twice at schoolboy level and went on to win 13 full international caps for Wales. He made his debut on 22 April 1931 against Ireland at the Racecourse Ground, Wrexham, in the British Home Championship, scoring the opening goal in a 3–2 win after only 3 minutes.

He played as a forward, either at centre-forward or on the right. He was skilful with the ball but had a short temper which sometimes caused him disciplinary problems. After retirement from the game Phillips kept a pub, first in the Bushbury district of Wolverhampton and later in Lichfield, Staffordshire. He died in Lichfield in 1969 at the age of 59.

== Honours ==
with Wolverhampton Wanderers

- Football League Second Division champions: 1931–32

with Aston Villa

- Football League Second Division champions: 1937–38
