= Charlie Napier =

Scottish footballer

Personal information
- Full name: Charles Edward Napier
- Date of birth: 8 October 1910
- Place of birth: Bainsford, Scotland
- Date of death: 5 September 1973 (aged 62)
- Place of death: Laurieston, Falkirk, Scotland
- Position: Inside left

Youth career
- Cowie Thistle

Senior career*
Years	Team	Apps	(Gls)
–	Alva Albion Rangers		
1928–1935	Celtic	176	(82)
1928–1929	→ Maryhill Hibernians (loan)		
1935–1937	Derby County	80	(24)
1937–1939	Sheffield Wednesday	48	(9)
1939–1946	→ Falkirk (wartime)		
1946–1948	Stenhousemuir		

International career
1932–1937	Scotland	5	(3)
1932–1934	Scottish League XI	2	(2)
1939	→ Scotland (wartime)	1	(0)
- * Club domestic league appearances and goals

Charles Edward Napier (8 October 1910 – 5 September 1973) was a Scottish footballer who played for Celtic (winning the Scottish Cup in 1931 and 1933), Derby County, Sheffield Wednesday, Falkirk (unofficial wartime competitions only) and Stenhousemuir, and for the Scotland national team and the Scottish League XI.
