= Dally Duncan =

Scottish footballer and manager

Personal information
- Full name: Douglas Duncan
- Date of birth: 14 October 1909
- Place of birth: Aberdeen, Scotland
- Date of death: 2 January 1990 (aged 80)
- Place of death: Brighton, England
- Position: Left winger

Youth career
- Aberdeen Richmond

Senior career*
Years	Team	Apps	(Gls)
1928–1932	Hull City	111	(47)
1932–1946	Derby County	261	(63)
- → Reading (wartime)
- → Notts County (wartime)
- → Nottingham Forest (wartime)
1946–1948	Luton Town	32	(4)
Total		404	(114)

International career
1932–1937	Scotland	14	(7)

Managerial career
- 1947–1958: Luton Town
- 1958–1960: Blackburn Rovers
- * Club domestic league appearances and goals

Douglas "Dally" Duncan (14 October 1909 – 2 January 1990) was a Scottish football player and manager.

A left-winger, Duncan joined Hull City from Aberdeen Richmond in 1928 and spent his entire professional career in English football. He joined Derby County for £2,000 in 1932 and remained contracted to the club until 1946. During this period he earned 14 caps in the Scotland national team, scoring 7 goals between 1932 and 1937. He also received an FA Cup winners medal with Derby in 1946.

After "guesting" for Reading, Notts County and Nottingham Forest during World War II, Duncan moved to Luton Town as a player-coach in October 1946. He was appointed manager in June 1947 and retained the position until October 1958. He then managed Blackburn Rovers for two seasons, helping them to the FA Cup final in 1960. The Blackburn performance included a man of the match performance by Ally MacLeod.

Duncan ran a guest house in Brighton after his football retirement. He died in 1990, aged 80.

== International goals ==
Scores and results list Scotland's goal tally first.

#	Date	Venue	Opponent	Score	Result	Competition
1	26 October 1932	Tynecastle Park, Edinburgh	Wales	2–5	2–5	BHC
2	4 October 1933	Ninian Park, Cardiff	Wales	2–3	2–3	BHC
3	21 November 1934	Pittodrie Park, Aberdeen	Wales	1–0	3–2	BHC
4	6 April 1935	Hampden Park, Glasgow	England	1–0	2–0	BHC
5	6 April 1935	Hampden Park, Glasgow	England	2–0	2–0	BHC
6	5 October 1935	Ninian Park, Cardiff	Wales	1–0	1–1	BHC
7	13 November 1935	Tynecastle Park, Edinburgh	Ireland	2–1	2–1	BHC

== Honours ==
Derby County

- FA Cup: 1945–46
