= Thomas Griffiths (footballer, born 1906) =

Welsh footballer

Tom Griffiths
Personal information
- Full name: Thomas Percival Griffiths
- Date of birth: 21 February 1906
- Place of birth: Moss Valley, Wrexham, Wales
- Date of death: 25 December 1981 (aged 75)
- Place of death: Moss Valley, Wrexham, Wales
- Height: 5 ft 10 in (1.78 m)
- Position: Centre-half

Youth career
- Frith Valley
- Wrexham Boys Club

Senior career*
Years	Team	Apps	(Gls)
1922–1926	Wrexham	35	(2)
1926–1931	Everton	76	(9)
1931–1933	Bolton Wanderers	48	(6)
1933–1935	Middlesbrough	88	(1)
1935–1937	Aston Villa	65	(1)
1938–1939	Wrexham	10	(0)
Total		322	(19)

International career
1927–1937	Wales	21	(3)
- * Club domestic league appearances and goals

Thomas Percival Griffiths (21 February 1906 – 25 December 1981) was a Welsh international footballer of the 1930s.

Tom Griffiths was born in Moss Valley, Wrexham. A center-half, Griffiths was a tall, rangy player who joined home-town club Wrexham in 1922, transferring to Everton in 1926. Despite his efforts, the Merseysiders were relegated at the end of that season. After 78 games for the Toffees, Griffiths was sold to Bolton Wanderers, where he faced a relegation battle again, and he played 48 League games for Wanderers.

Capped by Wales on 21 occasions, Griffiths scored three goals in the course of his international career.
