= Dai Astley =

Welsh footballer (1909–1989)

Personal information
- Full name: David John Astley
- Date of birth: 11 October 1909
- Place of birth: Dowlais, Wales
- Date of death: 7 November 1989 (aged 80)
- Place of death: Birchington-on-Sea, England
- Height: 5 ft 11 in (1.80 m)
- Position: Forward

Senior career*
Years	Team	Apps	(Gls)
1927–1928	Merthyr Town	5	(3)
1928–1931	Charlton Athletic	96	(27)
1931–1936	Aston Villa	165	(92)
1936–1938	Derby County	93	(45)
1938–1940	Blackpool	20	(6)
1946–1947	Metz	10	(2)

International career
1931–1938	Wales	13	(12)

Managerial career
- 1948: Internazionale
- 1949–1950: Genoa
- 1950–1954: Djurgården
- 1955–1957: Sandvikens IF
- * Club domestic league appearances and goals

David John Astley (11 October 1909 – 7 November 1989) was a Welsh international footballer who played as an inside forward in The Football League in the 1920s and 1930s.

== Club career ==
Dowlais-born Astley played for Merthyr Town, Charlton, Aston Villa, Derby County, Blackpool and Metz. He scored 92 goals for Aston Villa in 165 matches.

Astley made his league debut on 19 November 1927 against Bournemouth & Boscombe Athletic. When Albert Lindon was appointed player-manager at Charlton Athletic in January 1928, he signed Astley for £100. Astley made his debut for Blackpool, then under the managership of Joe Smith, two-thirds of the way through the 1938–39 campaign, in a 1–1 draw with Sunderland at Bloomfield Road on 25 January 1939. He went on to make a further sixteen League appearances before the season's end, scoring six goals. In 1939–40, he appeared in the three League games that occurred prior to the competition being abandoned as a result of the outbreak of World War II.

After the war, he joined Metz, where he spent a year.

== International career ==
He was capped 13 times for the Wales national football team, scoring on 12 occasions. He scored two goals in Wales' final match of the 1933 British Home Championship, a 4–1 victory over Ireland which gave Wales the title.

== Management ==
Astley managed Djurgården and Sandvikens IF in Sweden from 1950 to 1954 and from 1955 to 1957, as well as Inter Milan during 1948 and Genoa in 1949.
