= History of the Wales national football team (1876–1976) =

Football team history

The Wales national football team is the third-oldest side in international association football. The team played their first match in March 1876, four years after Scotland and England had contested the first-ever international match. Wales played annual fixtures against Scotland, England, and later Ireland, and these were eventually organised into the British Home Championship, an annual competition between the Home Nations. Wales did not win their first championship until the 1906–07 tournament and this remained the nation's only triumph before the First World War. Wales improved considerably in the post-war period, and claimed three titles during the 1920s, although the team was often hindered by the reluctance of Football League clubs to release their players for international duty. The situation was so grave that, in the early 1930s, Wales were forced to select a team of lower league and amateur players which became known as "Keenor and the 10 unknowns", a reference to captain Fred Keenor and the relative obscurity of his teammates.

By the late 1930s, Wales were again able to call upon their strongest side, and enjoyed their most successful period in the British Home Championship, winning four titles in the six years before the Second World War. When competitive football resumed after the war, Wales began facing opponents from farther afield and played matches against other European nations for the first time. The side also began competing in qualification groups for the FIFA World Cup, but failed to qualify for the 1950 and 1954 tournaments. Under manager Jimmy Murphy, Wales qualified for their first World Cup in the 1958 tournament and progressed from their group before being defeated by Brazil in the quarter-final.

The side suffered a decline in the 1960s as the 1958 World Cup generation gradually retired. Dave Bowen replaced Murphy and managed the team for a decade on a part-time basis but enjoyed little success, failing to qualify for a World Cup or the early editions of the European Nations' Cup (later known as the European Championships). He did help the team to share the British Home Championship during the 1969–70 season, the last time Wales won the tournament before the competition was discontinued. In total, Wales won the championship twelve times, sharing five titles.

Bowen left in 1974, having turned down the chance to manage full-time. He was replaced by Englishman Mike Smith who led the team to the quarter-finals of the 1976 European Championships in their centenary year, when they were defeated by Yugoslavia. (Note: For the 1976 tournament, quarter-finals were played as a two-legged, home and away tie with the finals hosting only the semi-finals and beyond.)

== Formation and early matches ==
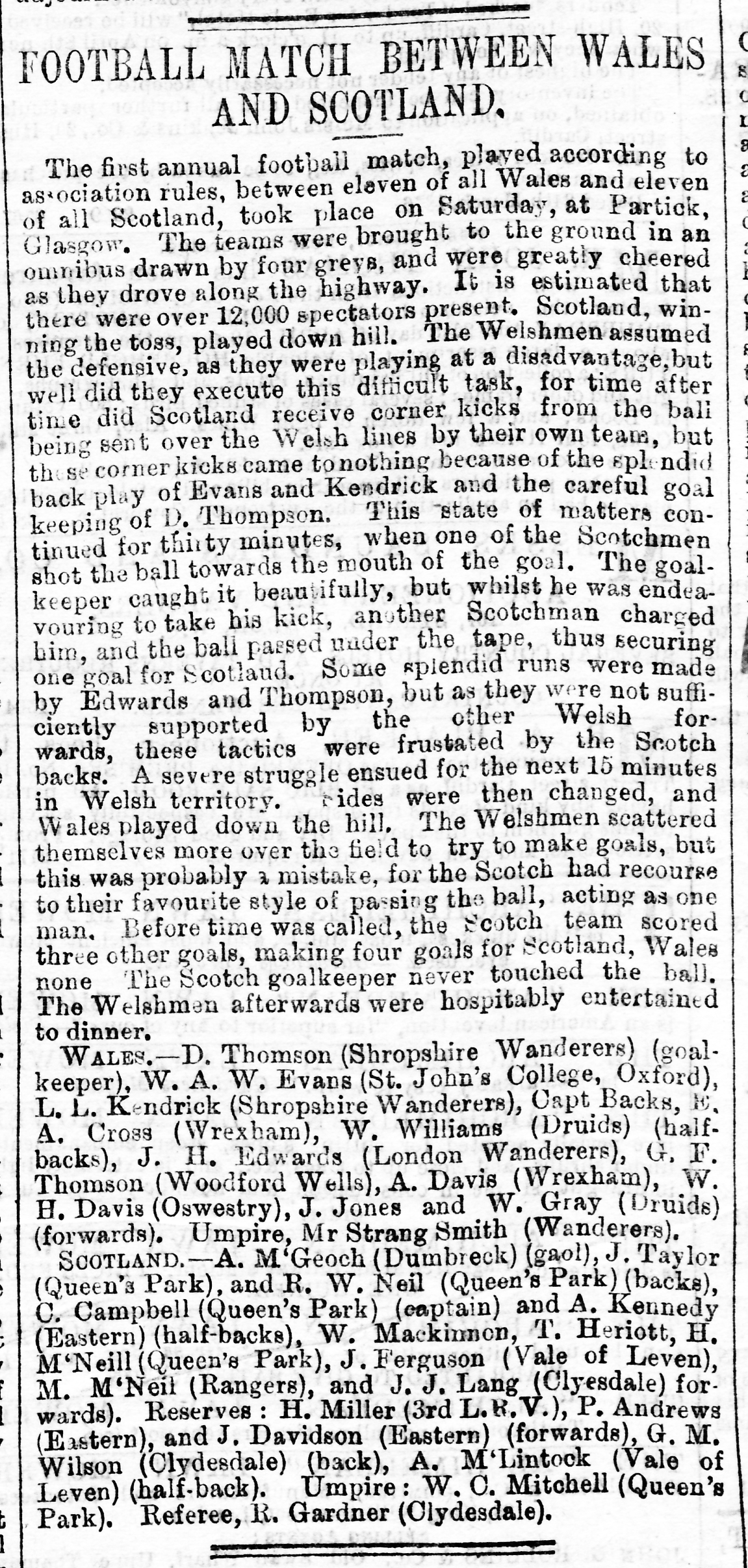
A newspaper report of Wales' first competitive match against Scotland in 1876

The first official international association football match was held in November 1872 between Scotland and England. Four years later, G. A. Clay-Thomas, a Welshman living in London, placed adverts in sports magazines The Field and Bell's Life proposing that a Welsh side be raised for a match against either Scotland or Ireland in rugby union. Llewelyn Kenrick, a solicitor who had helped to found Druids F.C. in North Wales, responded but instead pushed ahead with plans for a football match and accepted an invitation to play the Scottish national side. He helped establish the Football Association of Wales (FAW) in February 1876 to finalise arrangements for the forthcoming match, being appointed its first secretary. To qualify for selection, players were required to be Welsh or to have resided in the country for at least three years. Kenrick was criticised by some in South Wales for failing to notify players in the region of the forthcoming match, instead publishing notices in London-based journals. Unperturbed, he continued with his plans and trial matches were held to find suitable players for the match.

The first Wales international football match was held on 25 March 1876 at Hamilton Crescent in Partick with the side wearing a kit consisting of white shirts, featuring the Prince of Wales' feathers, and black shorts. The Welsh side were outclassed by their more experienced opponents, suffering a 4–0 defeat. A second fixture between the two sides was arranged for the following year, and the Racecourse Ground in Wrexham became the venue for Wales' first home international. The Welsh side fell to a 2–0 defeat in the match. Wales returned to Scotland in 1878 but a fixture clash with the final of the Welsh Cup between Druids and Wrexham led many players to refuse to travel. Such was the desperation to find willing players that the secretary of the Scottish Football Association travelled to Wales and visited the homes of players in an attempt to raise a side. A squad was eventually assembled but, having travelled overnight to Glasgow and containing many players who were not of sufficient standard, the side were defeated 9–0. As of June 2020, the result remains Wales' worst defeat in international football.

In 1879, Wales and England met for the first time in international football at a snow-covered Kennington Oval in South London. The poor weather conditions resulted in the match being shortened to 60 minutes and the relatively unknown status of the Welsh side led to a low turnout of spectators; newspaper reports estimate the crowd was in the low hundreds with some even writing there were fewer than 100 in attendance. In the match, William Davies scored Wales' first international goal but his side were defeated 2–1 following goals from Herbert Whitfeld and Thomas Sorby. The standard of the Welsh side was slowly improving and the side nearly held the visiting English side in March 1880. Having trailed 3–0, the Welsh side scored twice in the final ten minutes through William Roberts and John Roberts but were unable to equalise. William Roberts also scored Wales' goal against Scotland two weeks later in a 5–1 defeat. Wales travelled to Alexandra Meadows in Blackburn the following year to play England; John Vaughan scored the only goal of the game as Wales won their first international football match.

Ireland were the final Home Nation to establish an international football team, playing their first fixture in February 1882 against England. Having suffered a 13–0 defeat in their first match, the Irish side travelled to the Racecourse Ground to meet Wales for the first time. The more experienced Welsh side also proved too strong for the Irish, John Price becoming the first Welshman to score a hat-trick in international football during a 7–1 victory. Buoyed by their win, the Welsh side met England a month later and recorded a second victory over their neighbours. England had taken a 2–1 lead but were reduced to ten men when Charles Bambridge suffered a shoulder injury. Wales pulled the score back to 3–3 before scoring twice in the final three minutes to claim a 5–3 victory.

== Start of the British International Championship ==
With all the Home Nations competing regularly, the decision was taken to introduce a competitive tournament between the sides, and the British International Championship (later to become better known as the British Home Championship) was created in 1884. The inaugural tournament was won by Scotland who won all three of their ties. Having defeated Ireland 6–0 in their opening match, Wales went on to finish third after suffering successive defeats to England and Scotland. The early stages of the competition continued on the same lines; England and Scotland competed for the title, while Wales would finish third by defeating Ireland. In the first three years of competition, Wales' only points other than in matches against Ireland was a 1–1 draw with England in the 1884–85 tournament. In the 1886–87 edition, Wales finished bottom of the competition for the first time after losing all three of their matches, including a 4–1 defeat to Ireland in the nation's first victory in international football. Wales had struggled to raise a team for the match and included Wrexham defender Bob Roberts playing as the goalkeeper. FAW secretary Alexander Hunter also stepped in when Humphrey Jones withdrew late. Hunter had never played football at such a level and his performance was described as "glaringly deficient".

In a reversal of the previous year's events, the Freeman's Journal wrote that a weakened Ireland team travelled to Wales for the 1887–88 British Home Championship. The publication reported that "some young gentlemen from Belfast" had claimed to represent Ireland and went on to lose the match 11–0, although there were only four debutants in the team on the day. The scoreline remains a record victory for Wales. Jack Doughty scored four goals, and the game was so one-sided that three Welsh players left the field before the match ended to ensure they were on time for their train home. After 5–1 defeats to both England and Scotland, Wales again finished third.

Wales avoided defeat in a fixture against Scotland for the first time with a goalless draw in the 1888–89 British Home Championship. The feat was achieved despite local amateur Alf Pugh starting in goal for Wales after the original selection, James Trainer, failed to arrive at the match. Pugh played the first 30 minutes before Wrexham's Sam Gillam arrived and took his place, thus becoming the first substitute ever used in international football. The following year, Wales played a home fixture outside the nation for the first time when a meeting with Ireland was held in Shrewsbury in an attempt to draw a large crowd. Wales won the match 5–2. By the early 1890s, with the domestic game thriving in England, Wales were struggling to get players released for international fixtures, particularly for away matches against Ireland which required a three-day absence from a player's club due to ferry travel. As a result, Wales finished bottom of the British Home Championship five times during the decade, including three consecutive seasons between 1891 and 1893. Wales did record their highest placed finish to date in 1895 by coming second to England after drawing all three of their fixtures, inspired by the likes of James Trainer, Billy Lewis and a debuting Billy Meredith.

Wales continued their good form at the start of the 1895–96 British Home Championship by defeating Ireland 6–0 with both Meredith and Lewis scoring braces. The team's optimism was short-lived, as they suffered a heavy 9–1 defeat to England in their following match, with Steve Bloomer scoring goals. Wales would finish the 19th century by losing nine of their final ten matches, only avoiding defeat in a 2–2 draw with Scotland in March 1897. The difficulties in calling up players from English teams became so pronounced the FAW put forward a motion that national teams be granted the right to overrule clubs on player selection, although this was rejected. An approach to the English governing body, The Football Association, was also ignored.

== New century ==
The 1899–1900 British Home Championship revived hope for Wales as they finished as runners-up to Scotland, led largely by the goals of Meredith and Tom Parry. Although results were still disappointing, the standard of the Welsh side was thought to be improving rapidly as margins of defeat became smaller and several defeats to the English and Scottish sides between 1902 and 1905 were deemed unlucky by match reporters based on the run of play. The side also avoided defeat in an away fixture against the Scots in March 1904 after holding their opponents to a 1–1 draw. The following year, Wales defeated Scotland for the first time in the team's history when goals from Meredith, Grenville Morris and Walter Watkins secured a 3–1 victory, although Wales were unable to capitalise on the victory as they finished second to England in the 1905–06 British Home Championship after failing to win either of their remaining fixtures. Having missed the previous two years while serving a ban for his part in the 1905 English football bribery scandal, Meredith returned to play for Wales in the 1906–07 British Home Championship. In their first match, Wales defeated Ireland 3–2 in Belfast with Meredith scoring his side's second goal before Lot Jones scored the winning goal. Grenville Morris scored the only goal of the match to give Wales their third consecutive victory over Scotland. In Wales' final match, Lot Jones gave his side the lead at Craven Cottage before England equalised in the second half. England went on to draw their final game of the tournament against Scotland, handing Wales their first British Home Championship success. All 21 players used in the tournament were awarded a commemoration medal by the FAW for the achievement.

The team's fortunes suffered a complete reversal in the 1907–08 Championship. After losing their opening match against Scotland, the side suffered a 7–1 home defeat to England in a match where three goalkeepers were used. The starting goalkeeper, Leigh Richmond Roose, was forced off with injury in the opening 15 minutes, leading to defender Charlie Morris taking over in his absence. At half-time, England agreed that Dai Davies, who was in the crowd for the game, could enter the game to replace Roose. A final defeat against Ireland resulted in Wales finishing bottom of the championship table one year after winning the tournament outright. Ted Robbins was appointed FAW secretary in 1909, while one of Wales' most prominent players of the era, goalkeeper Roose, entered a steady decline. Although considered "one of the greatest players of his generation", Roose had developed a reputation for eccentricity that began to prove costly at times. In March 1910, Wales suffered a 1–0 defeat to Scotland when Roose allowed a speculative shot into the net having had his back turned towards play, talking to a spectator. In November of the same year, Roose suffered a broken arm while playing for his club side but declared himself fit for the British Home Championship internationals in March 1911. A poor performance in a 2–2 draw with Scotland ultimately ended his international career as he was never selected for Wales again.

Wales came within one match of winning a second title in 1912 and 1913, losing deciding matches against England on both occasions. In the final championship before the First World War, Wales finished bottom of the table with one point after recording one draw and two defeats. Robbins complained that English clubs had been "antagonistic" when asked to release players for international duty. In December 1914, the Home Nations took the decision to suspend the British Home Championship following the outbreak of the war. Eight players who had represented Wales in international football were killed during the conflict, including Roose.

Wales' first fixtures at the end of the war were two friendly matches against England, organised to raise funds for the FAW. The matches were not considered full internationals, being titled victory matches instead. Wales won the first meeting, led by the 40-year-old Meredith, but were defeated in the return match a fortnight later. The British Home Championship returned for the 1919–20 season with Wales' first official post-war match ending in a 2–2 draw with pre-war champions Ireland in Belfast. A draw against Scotland was followed by a 2–1 victory over England, the first time Wales had defeated their neighbours in a competitive fixture since 1882. Goals from Stan Davies and Dick Richards secured victory for Wales, who had been reduced to ten men in the second half when Harry Millership went off injured, but the performance of the now 45-year-old Meredith drew headlines. Winning his final cap, 25 years after his debut, Meredith wept openly at the end of the match. He ended his international career as both Wales' most-capped player and record goalscorer having scored 11 times in 48 appearances. To secure the championship, the team still needed England to defeat Scotland. The Scots led 4–2 at half-time, but lost the match 5–4, handing the title to Wales.

== 1920s success and decline ==
Wales were unable to defend their title in the 1920–21 season. Although losing 2–1 to Scotland in the opening game, a goalless draw with England and a 2–1 victory over Ireland did secure the side the runners-up spot. With club sides in Wales attracting record crowds, the national team often found itself losing out to the domestic game in terms of spectators. The victory over Ireland came on the same day Cardiff City hosted South Shields in the Football League Second Division; only 11,000 attended the national side's match in Swansea while more than 30,000 attended Cardiff's fixture. Disappointing results between 1922 and 1923 prompted a revamp of the team for the 1923–24 British Home Championship. One of the debutants in the team was Swansea Town's Willie Davies who scored in a 2–0 victory over Scotland in the opening game. Davies added a further goal again in Wales' second match, a 2–1 victory over England with Ted Vizard scoring the winning goal. A final win over Ireland, via a Moses Russell penalty, secured the title for Wales having beaten all three sides in the same tournament for the first time. The success was partly attributed to the team's star players being released to play, but the change was short-lived. Six players withdrew from the squad for the opening match of the 1924–25 tournament, a 3–1 defeat to Scotland. Wales' success did prompt England to agree to a Saturday fixture in Wales for the first time; Fred Keenor scored for Wales but the side fell to a 2–1 defeat. Only a goalless draw with Ireland stopped Wales finishing last, a year after winning the tournament.

Squad withdrawals continued to be a problem for the Welsh side. When Wales were left short for the visit of Scotland in the 1925–26 Championship, Ted Robbins called up debutant Jack Lewis after following him to a train station in Newport where he was due to travel to Birmingham to play for Cardiff City. Defeats to Scotland and Ireland followed and Robbins was again forced to make a late addition for the final match against England: John Pullen had been travelling to London with Moses Russell and was persuaded to join up to win his first cap, alongside Charlie Jones. Wales went on to win the match 3–1. Wales recorded a third championship win of the decade during the 1927–28 tournament, despite starting the competition poorly: they conceded two goals in the first half against Scotland before Ernie Curtis and an own goal by Jimmy Gibson salvaged a point. Wales defeated England 2–1 before travelling to Belfast to play Ireland in the final match. The game was tied at 1–1 until Wilf Lewis secured the win for Wales by charging both the ball and opposition goalkeeper into the net. When Ireland defeated Scotland two weeks later, Wales were officially confirmed as winners.

In 1929, the FAW received an invitation to tour Canada and selected a 20-man squad for the trip. Wales played 15 matches against regional teams in a little over a month on the tour, winning them all. Len Davies proved prolific during the tour, scoring seven of his side's goals in an 8–0 victory over Lower Mainland. Wales returned to one of the worst British Home Championship campaigns in their history. After suffering a 4–2 defeat to Scotland in the opening match, Wales endured a 6–0 defeat to England in their second fixture. The tournament ended with a severely depleted Wales side succumbing to a 7–0 defeat to Ireland in which Joe Bambrick scored six of his side's goals, the most any player has scored in a single match against Wales. The national side's poor results at the end of the 1920s were partly blamed on the deterioration of Welsh club sides. By the end of the decade, Cardiff City had been relegated to the Second Division, Aberdare Athletic had dropped out of the Football League and both Newport County and Merthyr Town had survived re-elections to avoid the same fate.

== Pre-war recovery ==
In 1930, the Football League introduced a new ruling which prohibited its members from releasing players for international fixtures. The ruling was designed to force international matches to be scheduled on days that would not clash with Football League fixtures. Wales' first match under the ruling was the opening game of the 1930–31 British Home Championship against Scotland, who were largely unaffected as they drew the majority of their players from Scottish leagues. Wales were forced to call up a mixture of lower division and amateur players to field a side. Nine of Wales' eleven players made their international debut in the game; only captain Fred Keenor and goalkeeper Len Evans had previous international experience. As a result, the team was dubbed "Keenor and the 10 unknowns". Ahead of the match, Keenor asked Ted Robbins if he could have the players to himself for four hours before the game. Taking the team to relax and discuss tactics for the match, in his pre-match team talk he exhorted his teammates, "There's eleven of them and eleven of us, and there's only one ball, and it's ours." Despite their inexperience, the Welsh side held Scotland to a 1–1 draw having taken the lead after six minutes from a goal by Tommy Bamford. The display led to a Scottish newspaper describing the Welsh performance as "the pluckiest display in the history of international football". The Welsh public also responded by calling for the same side to remain for the following match against England, although Elvet Collins was replaced due to injury. There was no repeat of the result; the Welsh side lost 4–0 at the Racecourse Ground.

A compromise between the Football League and the other Home Nations was reached in 1931, the sides being required to provide 21 days notice for a player's release, although the club were only obliged to release English players. The FAW would also be responsible for the wages and insurance of the players during the time away, a stipulation that placed increasing strain on the organisation's already stretched finances. In practice, the more inclusive ruling provided little improvement as the FAW's release requests for players were continually rejected; during the 1931–32 British Home Championship, Wales finished bottom after losing all their matches having used 26 players in only three games. This included Eddie Parris, who became the first black player to represent Wales. The FAW subsequently gave in to the Football League and agreed to hold matches in midweek to avoid a fixture clash. The decision proved astute as Wales defeated Scotland 5–2 in the opening game of the 1932–33 tournament. Fred Keenor won his 32nd and final international cap in the game, earning praise for his performance. A goalless draw with England and a 4–1 victory over Ireland secured Wales' fifth Home Championship title.

Wales travelled to Paris, France, in May 1933 to play their first international fixture against an opponent other than the Home Nations. Tommy Griffiths scored Wales' goal in a 1–1 draw with France at the Stade Olympique Yves-du-Manoir. Buoyed by their championship victory, the Welsh team began their title defense in the 1933–34 British Home Championship by securing a 3–2 victory over Scotland in front of 40,000 fans at Ninian Park. A draw with Ireland in Belfast meant Wales required a victory over England to guarantee consecutive titles. The match was played at St James' Park in Newcastle with Wales taking an early lead through Tommy Mills. The tension of the match was so intense Mills nearly failed to return for the second half having been sick during half-time. Eric Brook equalised for England in the second half but, with less than ten minutes remaining, Dai Astley scored a header to give Wales victory and win the Home Championship in consecutive years for the only time in the nation's history.

Wales failed to retain their title in the 1934–35 competition, finishing last, but narrowly missed out on another title in the 1935–36 British Home Championship. Needing a win against Ireland to secure the championship, Wales lost 3–2. The side recovered the following season and defeated England in a home fixture for the first time since 1882 with goals from Pat Glover and Seymour Morris. Glover again proved the match winner in Wales' second fixture, scoring both goals as the side defeated Scotland 2–1. Wales won their third title in five years by defeating Ireland 4–1 in their last fixture, Glover scoring two more to finish as top goalscorer with five goals in the competition. Wales also went on to share the 1938–39 British Home Championship title with both England and Scotland after all three sides attained four points in the final tournament before the outbreak of the Second World War.

== Wartime and new overseas competition ==
The British Home Championship was postponed during wartime; Wales' final fixture before the start of the war was a 2–1 defeat against France. The side's first wartime fixture was a 1–1 draw with England in a charity match to raise money for the Red Cross. The following year, in 1940, Wales were hosted at Wembley Stadium for the first time having previously been considered unlikely to draw a crowd large enough to fill the ground. Wales won the match 1–0 through a goal by Bryn Jones. For the majority of the war, Wales played only fixtures against England, the two sides meeting fifteen times between 1939 and 1945. Wales' final wartime matches were against Scotland and Northern Ireland. As the war drew to a close, Wales were dealt a blow by the death of Ted Robbins in January 1946. Robbins had served as secretary of the FAW since 1909 and was credited as a major factor in the team's success in previous decades.

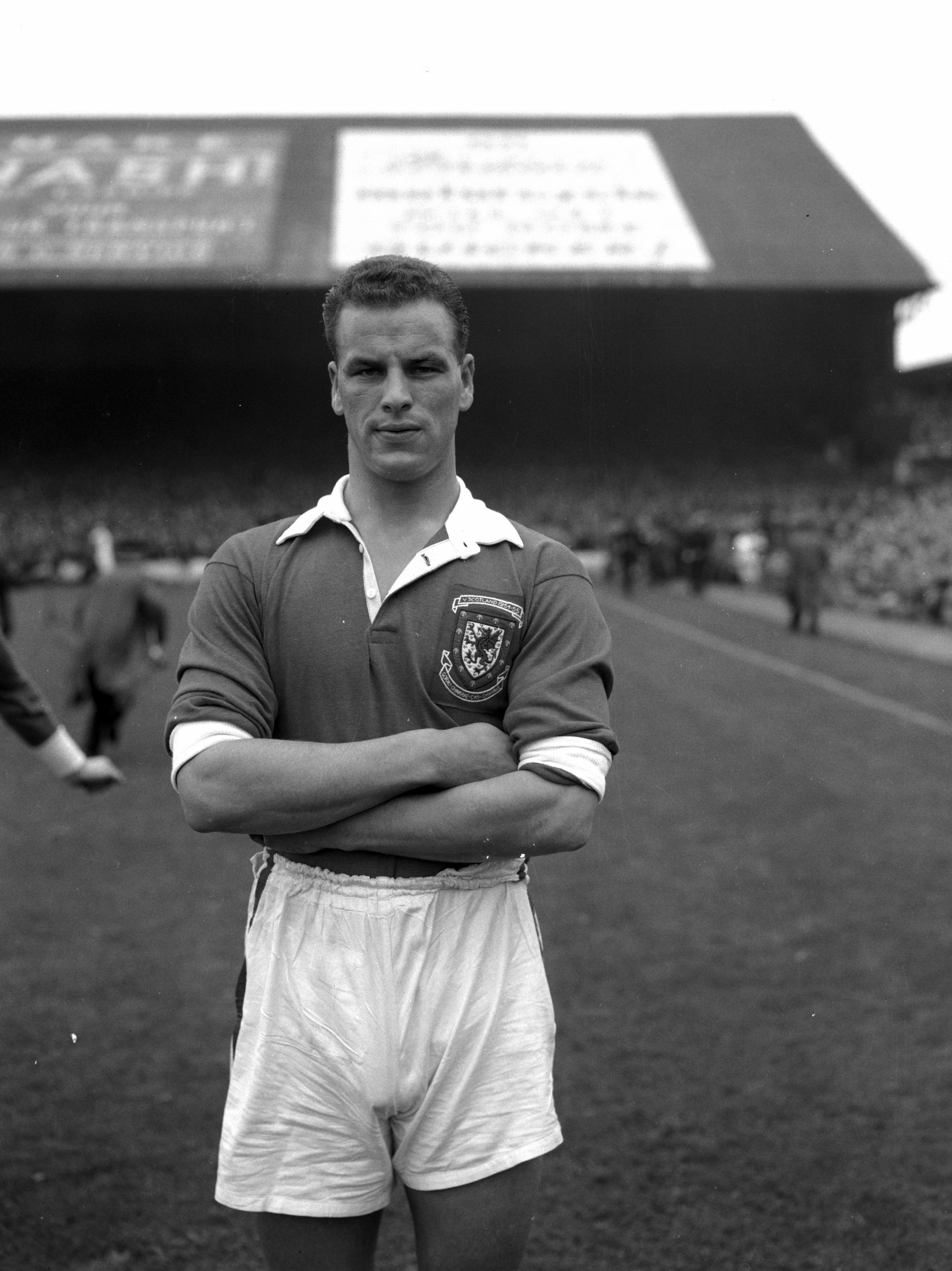
John Charles (pictured in 1954) was one of Wales' most prominent players during the 1950s.

The British Home Championship returned for the 1946–47 campaign and Wales' first competitive post-war fixture was against Scotland in October 1946. The wartime gap had increased public appetite for the sport and the break resulted in an entirely new generation of players being involved in the squad. One of the debutants, Trevor Ford, was on the scoresheet for Wales as the secured a 3–1 victory. Defeats to England and Northern Ireland resulted in a third-place finish. The following year, Wales began their campaign with a 3–0 defeat against England but defeated Scotland at Hampden Park for the first time. A win over Northern Ireland left Wales leading the group with only one match to be played. In the final match, England defeated Scotland to claim the championship by a single point. In 1949, the Wales national side embarked on their first overseas tour with matches against Belgium, Portugal and Switzerland. As all three opponents wore red shirts, the fixtures necessitated the first away kit in Wales' history. A yellow shirt with green collar and trim was adopted for the tour, featuring the Welsh Dragon on the pocket. The tour proved disastrous for the squad, as Wales lost all three fixtures and the squad was involved in a road accident when the team coach crashed during a tour of the Swiss Alps.

Wales and the other Home Nations entered the FIFA World Cup for the first time in the 1950 tournament and the 1949–50 British Home Championship was used to determine qualification for the tournament. The added incentive resulted in a crowd of more than 60,000 attending Wales' opening fixture against England at Ninian Park, but they witnessed their side suffer a 4–1 defeat. A further defeat to Scotland ended Wales' hopes of qualification and only a goalless draw with Northern Ireland stopped the side finishing bottom of the group on goal difference. Before the Ireland match, Belgium had travelled to Cardiff to become the first overseas side to visit Wales for an international match. Trevor Ford scored a hat-trick in a 5–1 victory for Wales. Portugal and Switzerland also travelled to Wales in 1951, as Wales responded to their earlier defeats by winning both matches. During the following year's championship, Trevor Ford became Wales' joint-leading goalscorer when he scored a brace during a 4–2 defeat to England. Having entered the match on ten goals, his double resulted in him overtaking tying Astley's tally of twelve.

The side celebrated their 75th anniversary by winning their first post-war British Home Championship, sharing the 1951–52 title with England. The two sides drew their first fixture and won their remaining matches to finish on five points each. Wales' final match of the competition was a 3–0 victory over Northern Ireland at Vetch Field, the first international match held at the ground in 25 years. The Welsh squad contained several young players born or brought up in the Swansea area, including Ford, Ivor Allchurch and Roy Paul, and the game was regarded as a homecoming match. Allchurch scored in the match to finish tied as the competition's top goalscorer. Wales struggled in the years immediately afterwards, finishing bottom of the Championship in consecutive seasons, including the 1953–54 tournament which saw the team fail to qualify for the 1954 FIFA World Cup. The period also included a disastrous European tour in 1953 during which Wales suffered a 6–1 defeat to France and a 5–2 defeat to Yugoslavia.

=== Austria and The Battle of Wrexham ===
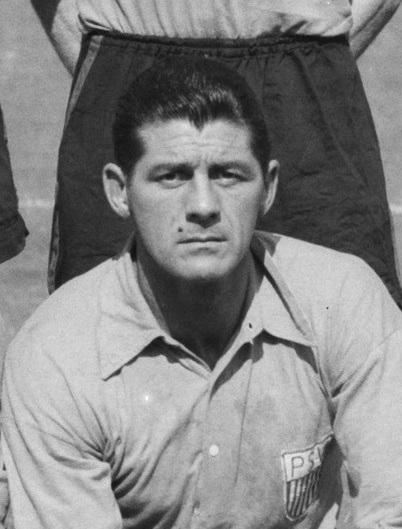
Trevor Ford, once Wales' record goalscorer and whose physical style of play was a reason for Austrian animosity

In 1954, encouraged by the work of Walter Winterbottom as England manager, the FAW appointed the first manager of the Welsh national side in former captain Walley Barnes. His first match in charge of the side was against Austria in Vienna which attracted 60,000 spectators. Despite winning 2–0, the Austrians were infuriated by the physical style of the Welsh players, particularly forwards Ford and Derek Tapscott. This playing style was unfamiliar outside Britain, and the Austrian captain, Ernst Ocwirk, described the match as "the dirtiest game he'd ever seen". Yugoslavia travelled to Wales in September 1954 in a reverse of the two sides' fixture in 1953 and became the first foreign opposition to win in Wales, with a final score of 3–1, despite having trailed 1–0 at half-time. Wales' burgeoning involvement in continental football resulted in the FAW being accepted as members of the recently founded Union of European Football Associations (UEFA) in 1954.

The 1955–56 British Home Championship brought some improvement for Wales as the side recorded their first victory over England in 17 years. The period also saw the emergence of John Charles as a regular for the national side. Charles and his brother Mel often played alongside another set of brothers, Ivor and Len Allchurch, becoming the first sets of brothers to play for Wales. John Charles quickly gained a reputation as the side's leading player, featuring as either a centre-half or centre-forward, and his performance in the victory over England led Western Mail reporter Dewi Lewis to describe him as "the perfect footballer if ever there was one". All four sides shared the British Home Championship title after finishing on three points, the only occurrence of a four-way tie in the competition's 100-year history. Wales narrowly missed out on winning the title having drawn 1–1 with Northern Ireland in their final game in which Roy Paul missed a penalty with Wales already leading 1–0. Ireland later equalised and the game ended as a draw.

At the end of 1955, Austria travelled to Wales a year after their 2–0 victory. The Austrian team were eager to match the physicality of the Welsh side shown in the first meeting and the match descended into violent chaos. The French referee, Louis Fauquemberghe, who was unable to speak either German or English, had little control as both sides continually resorted to fouling each other resulting in injuries to eight players. The most serious were to Austria's Theodor Wagner, who suffered a fractured tibia, and Wales' Mel Charles, who left the field with ten minutes remaining after being heavily fouled. Roy Paul later described the scene in the Welsh dressing room after the match in his autobiography, writing "Our goalkeeper, Jack Kelsey, had scars on both legs. Derek Tapscott ... had a six-inch gash on his knee. ... John Charles leaned over his brother Melvyn with tears in his eyes. Melvyn lay silent, still dazed by a tackle which had sent him crashing to the ground." The national media were highly critical after the match; the Western Mail described the match as "a disgrace", while The Times correspondent wrote "there were times when the pitch resembled a battlefield, with players down here and there."

== 1958 FIFA World Cup ==
=== Qualification and build-up ===
Disappointing results against European teams prompted a change of approach by the FAW who appointed Manchester United coach Jimmy Murphy as manager in 1956. His start was inauspicious, with draws against Northern Ireland and Scotland before a 3–1 defeat to England in a match where Wales finished with nine players due to injuries. The British Home Championship was dropped as a qualifying format for the 1958 FIFA World Cup and replaced by randomly drawn qualifying groups. Wales were placed alongside Czechoslovakia and East Germany and started positively by defeating Czechoslovakia 1–0 in their first fixture, via a goal by Roy Vernon. Wales travelled to East Germany for their second game with a squad of only 12 players. John Charles was highly critical of the FAW's reluctance to travel with more than a bare minimum of players, later writing "There were more selectors than players. It was crazy. You've got to put the players first but with Wales it was the selectors first and the players second." Wales eventually suffered a 2–1 defeat to the largely amateur East Germans in the nation's first competitive fixture.

The squad continued to Czechoslovakia but had lost three players to illness and injury. The FAW were still reluctant to call-up replacements and only an outcry from the press prompted Ray Daniel and Des Palmer to join up with the side. Nevertheless, Wales lost the match 2–0 which made qualification unobtainable. In the final group match, Palmer scored a hat-trick to defeat East Germany 4–1. A second opportunity at qualification emerged in December 1957 as the volatile political situation in Israel led to Turkey, Indonesia and Sudan withdrawing from matches against the nation for varying reasons. FIFA rules decreed that no team could qualify for a World Cup without playing a match, and so a play-off against a European qualifying group runner-up was arranged. Belgium was drawn first but also refused to play Israel leading to a second draw in which Wales were selected. The FAW accepted the offer and Wales travelled to Tel Aviv for the first leg, winning 2–0 after goals from Ivor Allchurch and Dave Bowen. The result was the first time Wales had won an international fixture outside Britain. Allchurch scored again in the second leg and a further goal from Cliff Jones secured Wales' first qualification to a major international tournament.

In the group stage of the tournament, Wales were drawn alongside Mexico, Hungary and hosts Sweden. The side's preparations for the tournament were hampered by confusion over the availability of John Charles; having failed to qualify, the Italian Football Federation had instead organised a club tournament featuring Charles' side Juventus who were reluctant to release the player. Wales manager Jimmy Murphy prepared his team to play without Charles, but the player eventually secured his release and arrived in Sweden only three days before the start of the competition. The side was further weakened by the omission of Trevor Ford, the nation's record goalscorer. He had been banned from playing in Britain in 1956 after he revealed an illegal payments scandal in club football in his autobiography. Despite continuing to play abroad, he was overlooked for selection. Derek Tapscott had also fallen out with the FAW while Des Palmer missed out due to injury, leading to Colin Webster being selected in their stead. Wales played a single warm-up match before the tournament, defeating local amateur side Saltsjöbaden 19–0.

=== Tournament ===
Wales' opening game of the tournament was against Hungary. Although the Hungarian Golden Team had previously been considered one of the best teams in the world, the Hungarian Revolution of 1956 had weakened the side as many of its players had fled the country. Nevertheless, Hungary quickly took the lead in the opening five minutes through József Bozsik. The Hungarian defensive efforts were largely focused on containing John Charles who received attention described as "rugged tactics" by The Times. Journalist Ian Wooldridge wrote that the Hungarian tactics were often "just inside or wildly outside the international laws of soccer". Charles scored an equaliser for Wales after 27 minutes, heading in from a corner to secure a 1–1 draw. In their second match, Wales played a Mexico side that had suffered a 3–0 defeat to Sweden in their opening game. The Welsh side entered the game as favourites but struggled to gain the advantage over their opponents. Ivor Allchurch gave Wales the lead in the first half but Mexico responded strongly and scored a late equaliser in the 89th minute with Wales having been reduced to 10 men after Colin Baker had been injured.

In their final group match, Wales met Sweden who had already qualified for the quarter-finals and had rested several players as a result. The Swedes were still the stronger of the two teams but were unable to breach the Welsh defense and the match ended goalless. Wales finished the group stage with three points, tied for second with Hungary necessitating a play-off match between the two sides to determine which would advance. Wales faced Hungary needing a victory; Hungary's superior goal difference meant a draw would see them advance. Wales were dealt a blow when Lajos Tichy gave Hungary the lead after 30 minutes while John Charles was again the focus of the Hungarian defence, leaving the field on more than one occasion to receive treatment. Charles though, proved pivotal as he set up Ivor Allchurch for Wales' equalising goal. Terry Medwin scored a second for Wales and, despite finishing the match with 10 men following an injury to Ron Hewitt, the side held on to advance to the quarter-finals.

Wales met Brazil, the winners of group 4, in the quarter-finals. Much of the build-up for Wales focused on John Charles' attempts to recover from injuries sustained against Hungary. Described by one reporter as having received "the most tremendous battering I have ever seen administered to a soccer player", Charles was unable to take his place in the side and was replaced by Colin Webster. Charles' absence proved costly as several chances were spurned with Brian Glanville of The Times remarking "Wales could have won because all sorts of very tempting centres were coming across the goal and John wasn't there to head them in." Brazil went on to win the match by a single goal, scored by Pelé.

== Post World Cup decline ==
=== World Cup generation fades ===
The success of the Welsh team in the World Cup resulted in huge demand for tickets for the side's opening match of the 1958–59 British Home Championship against Scotland, but the capacity home crowd at Ninian Park were left disappointed as Wales suffered a 3–0 defeat. Draws against England and Northern Ireland in the final two games left Wales bottom of the Championship, less than a year after their World Cup exploits. Wales began the 1960s by meeting the Republic of Ireland for the first time. The FAW had been against the Irish split and had resisted any attempts for the two sides to play for several years (England had played the Republic for the first time some 14 years earlier). Goals from Cliff Jones and Phil Woosnam won the match for Wales.

A shared British Home Championship title in 1959–60 British Home Championship and a positive finish to the following year's campaign had raised hopes of Wales qualifying for the 1962 FIFA World Cup in Chile. Wales were drawn in a group with Spain and Austria, although Austria withdrew due to financial problems before the matches began. Wales met Spain for the first match with a depleted side, missing several players including John Charles and Cliff Jones. Spain won the fixture 2–1 before the two sides drew 1–1 in the second game in Madrid, Ivor Allchurch scoring Wales' goal. The result eliminated Wales from qualifying for the World Cup. The post-World Cup interest in the team remained positive despite the elimination and led to a crowd of 62,634 attending a match against England at Ninian Park, a new record crowd for Wales and a record attendance for the ground. The side were invited to tour South America in 1962, the first matches played by the team outside Europe. The side played two matches against reigning World Cup holders Brazil, losing both 3–1. The tour concluded with a 2–1 defeat to Mexico and the retirement of long-serving goalkeeper Jack Kelsey from international football.

Wales entered the European Nations' Cup for the first time in the 1964 tournament (the Home Nations had not entered the inaugural edition in 1960). In the preliminary qualifying round, Wales were drawn against Hungary and suffered a 3–1 defeat in the first leg in Budapest. A 1–1 draw in the return leg resulted in the side's elimination at the first hurdle. In April 1964, manager Jimmy Murphy was forced to miss Wales' match against Northern Ireland after his wife was taken ill. Swansea Town manager Trevor Morris was placed in charge as Wales suffered a 3–2 defeat. Murphy never took charge of another match for Wales, resigning later in the year due to commitments at Manchester United. The FAW drew up a shortlist of Welsh candidates, which included former players Jack Kelsey, Ron Burgess and Tommy Jones. The role was eventually given to another former player, Dave Bowen, who had captained the team at the 1958 World Cup. Bowen took the job alongside his role as manager of Northampton Town. His first match in charge ended in victory when two late goals from Ken Leek secured a 3–2 win over Scotland in the 1964–65 British Home Championship.

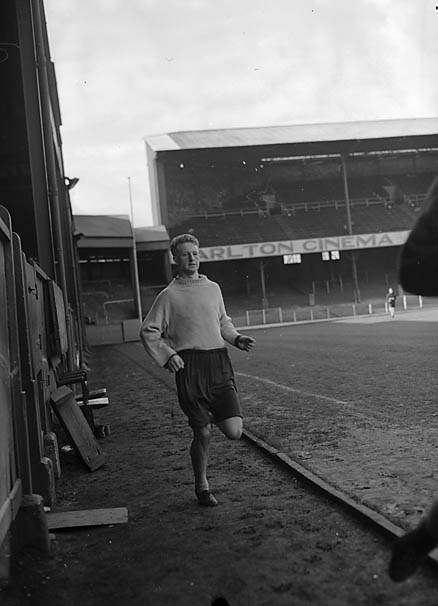
Ivor Allchurch retired in 1966 as both Wales' record appearance holder and joint record goalscorer.

Wales' qualifying group for the 1966 FIFA World Cup included the Soviet Union, the 1964 European Nations' Cup finalists, Greece and Denmark. The campaign began poorly for Wales as they lost 1–0 to Denmark in Copenhagen before losing a controversial game against Greece in Athens. Welsh players Ken Leek and Wyn Davies were continually fouled which led to brawls between players breaking out on several occasions. The home crowd also made attempts to break onto the pitch to confront the Welsh players which led to clashes with local police. Wales would avenge the defeat five months later with a 4–1 victory over Greece at Ninian Park in the return fixture. Wales travelled to Moscow in May 1965, suffering a 2–1 defeat in John Charles' final international appearance.

Dave Bowen was unavailable to manage Wales in their opening match of the 1965–66 British Home Championship due to club commitments. Ron Burgess took charge for the match, which ended in a goalless draw. Bowen returned for the return fixture against the Soviet Union in October 1965. His side recorded a surprise 2–1 victory over their previously unbeaten opponents, the only match the Soviet Union failed to win during qualifying, via goals by Roy Vernon and Ivor Allchurch. The result was not enough to secure qualification as, despite beating Denmark 4–2 in their final game, Wales finished as runners-up in the group behind the Soviets. Having failed to qualify for the World Cup, Wales instead embarked on another tour of South America in May 1966, playing two matches against Brazil and one against Chile. Ivor Allchurch made his final appearance for Wales in the 2–0 defeat to Chile in the final match of the tour. He retired as Wales' record appearance holder with 68 caps, and tied with Trevor Ford as the nation's record goalscorer with 23.

=== Late 1960s struggles ===
Like the early World Cups, the qualifying phase for the 1968 European Championships used the British Home Championship as a qualification group for the tour, the results of the 1966–67 and 1967–68 tournaments being combined to determine which one of the Home Nations would progress. Wales began the stage with a 1–1 draw against Scotland in October 1966 but ultimately finished third in the 1966–67 season after losing heavily to England and recording a goalless draw with Northern Ireland. For the 1967–68 championship, Wales adopted an all-red kit for the first time in the team's history. The team fared little better, losing to England and Scotland before recording their only victory of the Euro 1968 qualifying campaign by beating Northern Ireland 2–0.

Wales recorded a creditable 1–1 draw with West Germany in April 1969 ahead of the qualifying campaign for the 1970 FIFA World Cup, but the side was hampered by withdrawals and refusals to release players for matches. Wales' first match was against reigning European champions Italy and Dave Bowen was forced to name several reserve players in the line-up, although the team only lost to a single goal by Gigi Riva. The side travelled to West Germany to play a return friendly against the side; Bowen was able to select only 13 players for the trip. Wales recorded a second 1–1 draw; Barrie Jones had given Wales the lead before Gerd Müller equalised late in the match. The qualifying campaign for the 1970 World Cup ended with two defeats to East Germany and another to Italy as Wales failed to gain a single point. Wales also finished bottom of the last British Home Championship of the decade with a single point.

Wales' struggles during the late-1960s were blamed on several factors. The refusal of clubs to release players for international duty or not to allow a player to travel until the day before the match often disrupted the team. In his book Red Dragons: The Story of Welsh Football, Phil Stead writes that Dave Bowen often could "not pick a side until the day of the game because he was never sure who would be available." The final match of the 1970 World Cup qualification group against Italy was nearly forfeited as Wales struggled to name a squad. One player, Wrexham's teenage defender Gareth Davis, was contacted in the early hours of the morning and travelled overnight to make the team's flight to Rome. The organisation of the team by the FAW was also criticised. Gary Sprake later remarked that "the international set-up with Wales at this time was amateurish at best." Sprake later admitted to feigning injury under the guidance of his club manager Don Revie to avoid selection with the national side. John Toshack, who made his debut in 1969, made similar comments: "The whole set-up was a bit of a shambles ... some of the players with more fashionable clubs were not too concerned about turning up for the less glamorous games." An incident in 1969 drew considerable criticism of the FAW when the organisation failed to book enough seats for the ten travelling Welsh players and its members. When none of the officials offered to give up their seat, the crew declared that the last person to board the craft, winger Gil Reece, would have to disembark. A furious Reece was left at the airport and had to travel alone to Düsseldorf before crossing the border into East Germany.

== Departure of Bowen and arrival of Smith ==
Wales began the 1970s in a more positive fashion, sharing the 1969–70 British Home Championship with England and Scotland. Wales had drawn with both before defeating Northern Ireland. The success was the final time Wales were victorious in the competition. The title was the twelfth time it had won the competition and the fifth time it had shared the title. The team's victory raised hopes of qualifying for the 1972 European Championships. Wales were drawn in a group alongside Czechoslovakia, Romania and Finland. The campaign began with a goalless draw against Romania before a 3–1 defeat to Czechoslovakia, having led 1–0 with 12 minutes remaining. Wales recovered with home and away victories over Finland but lost their remaining games to finish third, failing to qualify. In Wales' home victory over Finland, Trevor Hockey became the first player to represent the nation under a new parentage rule allowing players to represent countries other than their own birth nations. His father had been born in Abertillery, thus qualifying him for Wales under the new ruling.

Wales' fortunes dipped alarmingly in the immediate years afterwards; the side finished bottom of the British Home Championship in four out of five seasons between 1971 and 1975, winning only one match. The team did perform slightly better during qualifying for the 1974 FIFA World Cup in which they were drawn against England and Poland. Wales lost to England in their opening game, failing to score for a sixth consecutive match, but surprised many by holding England to a draw in the return fixture at Wembley Stadium having taken an early lead through John Toshack. Wales met Poland in March 1973 and recorded a 2–0 victory through goals by Trevor Hockey and Leighton James. Shortly before half-time in the return match in Chorzów, Hockey became the first Welsh player to be sent off. The match deteriorated further in the second half as both sides committed fouls and several scuffles broke out between the sides. Terry Yorath commented that he felt his "physical well being was at risk" during the game, while The Times headline referred to the match as "a night of delinquency". In 1974, the FAW decided the Wales manager's job required a full-time occupant and offered Dave Bowen the position on a permanent basis. Bowen rejected the role, unwilling to leave his position with Northampton. The job was instead given to the FAW's head of coaching, Englishman Mike Smith.

=== 1976 European Championships ===
Smith's first test was the qualifying stage for the 1976 European Championships as Wales were drawn alongside Hungary, Austria and Luxembourg. In the opening match against Austria, Wales took the lead through Arfon Griffiths, but eventually lost 2–1. Griffiths scored again in Wales' next two matches, a 2–0 win over Hungary and a 5–0 win over Luxembourg. The side continued their good form by becoming the first British side to beat Hungary in the nation since 1909, winning 2–1 via goals by John Toshack and John Mahoney and inflicting Hungary's first competitive home defeat since 1959. A second victory over Luxembourg was Gary Sprake's final international appearance. Despite having been considered Wales' first choice goalkeeper for nearly a decade, he finished his career with 37 caps, later remarking "it was expected of you as a Leeds player that you put the club first." In the final match, Wales met Austria in Wrexham needing only a draw to guarantee progress from their group. Arfon Griffiths scored the only goal of the match as Wales secured a 1–0 victory. In March 1976, the national side celebrated their centenary year with a friendly against England at the Racecourse Ground, which ended in a 2–1 defeat.

For the 1976 European Championships, the qualifying group winners advanced to the quarter-finals. Normally this round was played at the tournament finals, but the 1976 competition quarter-finals were played as two-legged home and away ties with the winners advancing to the semi-finals to be held in Yugoslavia. (Note: Yugoslavia's hosting of the finals was dependent on the side progressing to the semi-finals.) Wales were drawn against the host nation for the quarter-final tie with the first leg being played in Zagreb. The Yugoslavians took the lead after only 45 seconds through Momčilo Vukotić before adding a second early in the second half to win 2–0. The second leg was billed as one of the biggest matches in Wales' history, and the FAW (which had grown increasingly short of funds) considered an offer to move the game to Wembley Stadium to maximise profit. The FAW board was split after a vote, leaving the decision in the hands of president Terry Squire who ultimately chose Ninian Park as the venue.

East German referee Rudi Glöckner was appointed for the match, and was infuriated when the flag of his home nation was not raised before the game. He controversially awarded Yugoslavia a penalty in the first half and disallowed a goal for Wales in the second, as the increasingly irate crowd made several attempts to enter the pitch. Missiles were aimed at Glöckner for the remainder of the match, which ended in a 1–1 draw and eliminated Wales from the competition. Violence flared again at the final whistle; Glöckner required a police escort from the pitch, Yugoslavia midfielder Jurica Jerković had a physical altercation with a Welsh fan who had run onto the pitch, and another Welsh fan was arrested after a corner flag, which had been thrown in anger at the referee, struck a policeman in the neck. As a result of the scenes during the match, Wales were initially handed a two-year ban from international football, although this was reduced on appeal to a fine of 20,000 Swiss francs and a requirement that home qualifying matches for UEFA Euro 1980 be held at least 200 kilometres (120 mi) from Cardiff.

== See also ==
- List of Cardiff City F.C. internationals
- List of Swansea City A.F.C. internationals
