= History of the Wales national football team (1977–present) =

History of national association football team

The Wales national football team is the third-oldest side in international association football.

== Mike Smith era ==
The Wales national side had reached the quarter-finals of the 1976 European Championships but suffered a controversial defeat to Yugoslavia and failed to reach the finals. (Note: For the 1976 tournament, quarter-finals were played as a two-legged, home and away tie with the finals hosting only the semi-finals and beyond.) The team's competitiveness had raised optimism amongst supporters ahead of qualifying for the 1978 FIFA World Cup, but this was eroded quickly as they suffered a 1–0 defeat against Scotland in their first qualifying game. However, a surprise 3–0 victory over Czechoslovakia, reigning European champions and unbeaten in their previous 22 fixtures, kept their hopes alive. Qualifying would not be completed until the end of 1977 as the 1976–77 British Home Championship was played in between. The competition began with a goalless draw with Scotland before a game against England became synonymous with Welsh nationalism. The Football Association of Wales (FAW) had started playing the Welsh anthem, "Hen Wlad Fy Nhadau", ahead of games and requested that the anthem be played before the game alongside the English anthem, "God Save the Queen. The Football Association (FA) refused the request, a decision which infuriated many of the Welsh players. At the match, the two teams stood in line for God Save the Queen but, as the English team took position ready to start the match, the Welsh side remained in line. FA officials attempted to hurry the players away but the Welsh side stood and sang their anthem on their own as the home crowd jeered. Spurred on, Wales went on to secure their only victory at Wembley Stadium as Leighton James converted a penalty he had won after being fouled by Peter Shilton to win 1–0. A 1–1 draw with Northern Ireland secured a second place finish in the Championship.

In September 1977, Wales played back-to-back fixtures against Kuwait, who became the first Arab side to play in Great Britain during the first match at the Racecourse Ground. The two teams played out a goalless draw and repeated the result two weeks later in Kuwait City. Qualification for the 1978 World Cup resumed in October, but Wales were forced to seek an alternative venue when both Ninian Park and the Racecourse Ground had their safety certificates revoked, resulting in capacity at the venues being greatly reduced. The match was eventually held at Anfield in Liverpool, becoming the first Welsh home fixture to be played outside the country since 1890. Despite attempts to ensure Welsh fans received priority for the home fixture, Scottish fans were able to obtain the majority of the tickets. There were numerous incidents of Wales fans being mugged by opposing fans outside the ground for their tickets, including FAW president Terry Squire who lost his to a pickpocket. Other Welsh fans at the game left at halftime, fearing for their own safety. There was further controversy on the pitch as Scotland were awarded a penalty for handball, despite the arm that had connected with the ball belonging to Scottish forward Joe Jordan. Scotland converted the penalty and added a second as Wales pushed for an equaliser to win the game. A 1–0 defeat to Czechoslovakia in their final qualifying game left Wales bottom of the group.

Wales manager Mike Smith was rewarded with a new three-year contract at the end of 1977, nearly doubling his annual salary in the process. He led the side to another second place finish in the 1977–78 British Home Championship, before enjoying a positive start to qualifying for the 1980 European Championships. They began their campaign by defeating Malta 7–0 at the Racecourse Ground with Ian Edwards scoring four of his side's goals. This was followed by a 1–0 victory over Turkey before they finished the first round of fixtures by losing 2–0 to West Germany. A third consecutive second place finish in the 1978–79 British Home Championship followed, which included a John Toshack hat-trick in a 3–0 win over Scotland, before Malta were defeated again in June 1979. However, the side's good form came to an end as they suffered defeats to West Germany and Turkey to finish third in their group and failed to qualify for the 1980 World Cup. Byron Stevenson later received a four-and-a-half year ban from international football after breaking the jaw of an opposition player in the latter game. The match was also Smith's final game in charge of the national side as he accepted an offer to manage Hull City.

== Mike England takes over Wales ==
=== Arrival and 1982 World Cup ===
The FAW compiled a six-man shortlist to find Smith's replacement and eventually appointed former captain Mike England in his first managerial role. He took charge of his first match in May 1980 against England and met his players for the first time only three days before the match. England had beaten reigning World Cup holders Argentina four days prior but Wales recorded an upset by winning 4–1 at the Racecourse with goals from Mickey Thomas, James, Ian Walsh and an own goal. The victory was their first home win over England for 25 years and remains their biggest win over their opponents, while the nature of the defeat led to violent clashes between the two sets of supporters. However, Wales were unable to capitalise on their victory, losing both of their remaining fixtures to finish third in the 1979–80 British Home Championship. England's first qualifying campaign in his new role was for the 1982 FIFA World Cup and consecutive 4–0 victories over Iceland and Turkey in their opening games led him to declare that Wales were "heading for the finals in 1982". His confidence was further raised when they defeated both Czechoslovakia and Turkey 1–0 to win their opening four games.

Wales' good form continued in the 1980–81 British Home Championship, defeating Scotland and holding England to a goalless draw at Wembley. The results meant that a win over Northern Ireland in their final game would give Wales their first Home Championship title since 1937. However, an increase in violence during The Troubles led ten of Wales' squad to refuse to travel for the match, despite assurances from Sinn Féin over safety. With England also refusing to travel, the competition was halted with no winner declared for the only time in the competition's history. Wales resumed qualifying for the 1982 World Cup by holding the Soviet Union to a goalless draw at the Racecourse with more than 29,000 spectators attending. Wales travelled to Czechoslovakia in September 1981 knowing a win would almost guarantee qualification, but an own goal by goalkeeper Dai Davies, the first goal he had conceded in more than 450 minutes of qualifying, and a second Czech goal in the second half gave Wales their first defeat of the campaign. In their next game, Wales were favourites to beat Iceland and took the lead in the first half. However, an electrical fire at Vetch Field delayed the match for more than 40 minutes with the players finishing the final minute of the first half before immediately returning to the dressing room for half time. Iceland took advantage of the disruption, equalising in the first minute of the second half and, despite Alan Curtis again giving Wales the lead, Iceland severely dented Wales' qualification hopes by securing a 2–2 draw. An irate England criticised his side's supporters, accusing rival fans of Cardiff City and Swansea City of being more focused on barracking each other than supporting their side.

Wales' entered their final game needing a point against the Soviet Union to qualify but their preparations were disrupted as the Russian authorities demanded that the Welsh side first travel to Riga and then Tbilisi before changing the team's hotel on arrival with England accusing the opposition of "trying to make things uncomfortable for us". His side fell to a 3–0 defeat in the game. The result, coupled with that of the Czechs, meant that Wales failed to qualify having finished tied on points with the Czechs but ultimately losing out on goal difference.

=== 1984 European Championships ===
A draw with Spain and defeats to Scotland and England in the 1981–82 British Home Championship left Wales winless in their previous eight fixtures, before they broke the run by beating Northern Ireland 3–0, a match which attracted Wales' lowest post-war crowd for an international with only 2,315 fans attending at the Racecourse. Crowds remained low as Wales began their qualifying campaign for the 1984 European Championships with a 1–0 win over Norway in front of less than 4,500 at Vetch Field. In their second fixture, Wales recovered from 4–2 down to draw 4–4 with Yugoslavia before losing to England in the 1983–84 British Home Championship. The match against England attracted only 24,000 fans at Wembley, adding increasing pressure on the future of the competition. A single goal from Jeremy Charles secured a victory over Bulgaria in their third qualifying match as Wales led the group early on. Before they continued their qualifying campaign, Wales secured a lucrative friendly against Brazil at Ninian Park in June 1983, paying £50,000 for the side to travel. Despite their opponents lofty reputation the match ended in a 1–1 draw, with Wales having initially led through Brian Flynn's goal, and generated more than £200,000 for the FAW.

A goalless draw with Norway in September, along with their opponents subsequent defeat to Yugoslavia, left Wales needing only two points from their final two matches to qualify. The first of the two fixtures started on bad terms as Wales arrived in Bulgaria to find their training ground of poor standard. England referred to the facilities as a "gypsy site" and Bulgarian officials later admitted that the poor facilities were chosen in retaliation for Wales' refusal to allow the Bulgarian team to train at the Racecourse Ground ahead of their previous meeting. Wales went on to lose the match 1–0 while England complained of the Bulgarians physical tactics, especially against Ian Rush who commented that he had "received the most savage treatment I had ever had to take", including being spat on by opposition substitutes. Nevertheless, Wales went into their final game against Yugoslavia at Ninian Park knowing a win would guarantee qualification. In an attempt to boost their chances, the FAW made a request to their English counterparts to postpone club games featuring Welsh players but this was rejected. Robbie James gave Wales the lead in the second half but Yugoslavia equalised before holding out to secure a draw. Wales could still qualify for the tournament if Bulgaria and Yugoslavia drew their final game or Bulgaria won by a single goal. The match nearly went in Wales' favour, with the match tied at 2–2 until the 92nd minute when Ljubomir Radanović scored a late winning goal for Yugoslavia, winning the group for his side and ending Wales' hopes of qualifying.

Wales were dealt a further blow by the decision to end the British Home Championship in its 100th year as the competition was one of the FAW's biggest revenue streams. The final competition began with a 2–1 defeat to Scotland but Wales went on to record a victory over England, with Mark Hughes scoring the only goal on his debut, and drew with eventual winners Northern Ireland.

=== 1986 World Cup ===
Wales began their qualifying campaign for the 1986 FIFA World Cup with a 1–0 defeat to Iceland in Reykjavik. England was furious with his understrength side for losing, while the Western Mail described the defeat as "one of the most disastrous defeats in the history of Welsh football." They lost to Spain in their second match but won their first game of the campaign in the reverse fixture against Iceland at the end of 1984. While their hopes of qualifying as group winners were largely over, the team focused on securing a second place finish which would qualify them for a play-off against teams from other continental federations to qualify. These hopes were boosted by a 1–0 victory over Scotland in Glasgow with Rush scoring the only goal of the game, while FAW secretary Alun Evans also claimed that the match essentially saved the organisation from bankruptcy by ensuring large crowds for their remaining group matches. This was followed by a 3–0 victory over Spain with Rush scoring a brace and Hughes a bicycle kick described in The Independent as "a goal of jaw-dropping audacity and athleticism".

In an attempt to maximise profits, the FAW scheduled the deciding final fixture at the Cardiff Arms Park. However, having initially agreed to the suggestion, the Welsh Rugby Union after refused amid fears over football hooliganism following the Heysel Stadium disaster. Three of the four teams in the group could still qualify ahead of the game, with Wales needing to win to guarantee at least a second place finish. More than 39,000 fans attended the game, moved to Ninian Park, and Wales took the lead in the opening 15 minutes through Hughes. In the second half, Scotland were awarded a controversial penalty when a shot struck the arm of Wales' David Phillips. Goalkeeper Neville Southall got a hand to the penalty but was unable to stop the shot as Scotland equalised. Scotland held on to secure the point needed to finish second and reach the qualifying play-offs. However, the match was overshadowed by the death of Scottish manager Jock Stein who suffered a heart attack in the dugout in the aftermath of his side's penalty. Spain's victory over Iceland, combined with the draw to Scotland, meant Wales had failed to qualify for the previous three major international tournament in their final match.

In attempt to raise funds, Wales played five friendlies in four months between February and May 1985. The first saw Wales become the first British side to play in Saudi Arabia, as Wales beat the home nation 2–1. The match earned the FAW £20,000 with Evans surprised to receive payment in the form of a briefcase of cash at the match. A month later, Wales defeated the Republic of Ireland 1–0 with Joey Jones coming out of international retirement to win a record 69th cap, surpassing Ivor Allchurch's record. A match against Uruguay backfired when a low crowd attended a goalless draw, with the gate receipts failing to cover the £30,000 paid to Uruguay to play the match. The final two matches were played against Canada.

=== 1988 European Championships and departure ===
Wales played their first competitive fixture for a year when they drew 1–1 with Finland to begin their qualifying campaign for the 1988 European Championships. A further draw with the Soviet Union and a win over Finland in the reverse fixture kept Wales' hopes of qualifying alive. The team also earned a late draw against Czechoslovakia, Rush equalising late in a game that Wales had struggled to make an impact in. Wales' campaign continued with consecutive fixtures against Denmark, winning the first match 1–0 at the Ninian Park. The second match ended with the same scoreline, but this time in favour of the Danes. England was furious with the winning goal, commenting "we were not beaten by Denmark, we were beaten by the referee. The player was four yards offside". The result left Wales needing to beat Czechoslovakia to qualify. The FAW were incensed ahead of the game when the FA postponed matches featuring English players but refused to do the same for Welsh players. As a result, Wales initially travelled to Prague with only ten fit players. Wales adopted an attacking approach to the match and had an early attempt cleared off the line but the Czechs went on to win 2–0.

The defeat to Czechoslovakia ultimately cost England his position and he left Wales after eight years. The FAW immediately identified Nottingham Forest manager Brian Clough as their first choice replacement, and he was favourable to taking the position but relented when Forest refused to allow him to work simultaneously with both Wales and Forest. David Williams was appointed as caretaker-manager with the FAW still hoping that Clough would take the position. Williams' only match in charge ended in a 3–1 defeat to Yugoslavia. Terry Yorath was appointed on a short-term contract covering Wales' next three games, with the FAW still waiting for Clough. Rush was critical of this approach, describing it as "so unsettling". Yorath's tenure began with a 4–1 defeat to Sweden although he was hampered by so many defensive injuries that his chosen defence consisted of four midfielders. He won his second match, 3–2 against Malta, and led his side to a 1–0 win over Italy in Milan three days later.

== Rankings rise under Yorath ==
The victory over Italy led the FAW to appoint Yorath on a full-time basis, alongside his position at Swansea with the FAW paying a third of his club wages as compensation. His first match as the permanent manager was a defeat to the Netherlands in September 1988 in Wales' opening qualifier for the 1990 FIFA World Cup and a 2–2 draw with Finland a month later essentially ended their hopes of qualification early on. Their following qualifier against West Germany was moved to the National Stadium and attracted a positive response from the manager, players and fans as a goalless draw raised more than £250,000 in revenue for the FAW. However, their poor qualifying campaign continued as they lost all three of their remaining fixtures and finished bottom of their qualifying group. The improvement in finances did however provide the FAW with opportunity to improve the grassroots level of the game, with the under-21 team resurrected and the appointment of Jim Shoulder to oversee the youth development of the game in Wales.

The qualifying campaign for the 1992 European Championships saw Wales drawn alongside Luxembourg, Belgium and the now unified Germany and started positively as they defeated Belgium in October 1990 in their opening match. Wales were given a scare against Luxembourg when Clayton Blackmore was sent off in the opening 15 minutes but they were able to secure a narrow victory through Rush's second goal of the campaign. A 1–1 draw with Belgium left Wales in direct competition with Germany to be group winners ahead of consecutive games against the pair. In preparation, Wales organised friendlies against Iceland and Poland. Yorath's assistant Peter Shreeves was placed in charge for the first match to allow Yorath to watch Germany in preparation for their meetings. Iceland were beaten 1–0 while the match against Poland ended in a goalless draw. Germany were unbeaten in 16 matches prior to the first meeting between the two sides at the National Stadium. The ground was sold out for the game, which turned in favour of Wales when Germany were reduced to ten men as Thomas Berthold was dismissed after an altercation with Kevin Ratcliffe. Wales capitalised as Rush scored his third goal in qualifying and, despite pressure from the Germans late in the game, Wales held out to win. The win led the FAW to appoint Yorath on a full-time basis, as he gave up his club commitments for the role.

Ahead of their second game against Germany, Wales met Brazil at the National Stadium for a friendly in which Southall won his 53rd cap to become Wales' most capped goalkeeper. Wales caused a further surprise by beating the Brazilians following a goal from Dean Saunders. However, Wales' optimism for the second tie was misplaced as they fell to a 4–1 defeat in Nuremberg, giving Germany the advantage in the group. A 1—0 win over Luxembourg in their final game moved Wales to the top of the group, with Peter Nicholas surpassing Jones cap record by winning his 73rd cap. To qualify, Germany needed to win both of their final matches against Belgium and Luxembourg, a feat they duly achieved as Wales finished second by a point and subsequently failed to qualify for the final tournament.

The team's narrow failure to qualify, along with a win over the Republic of Ireland and a draw with Austria in friendlies, led Wales to be considered contenders to qualify for the 1994 FIFA World Cup. Yorath dispensed with the sweeper formation for the opening match against Romania but the decision proved disastrous as they suffered a 5–1 defeat. Yorath was absent for a friendly defeat to the Netherlands and the team's two matches in the Kirin Cup tournament held in Japan following the sudden death of his son, with Shreeves again taking charge. With Yorath returning Wales defeated the Faroe Islands 6–0 in their next qualifying match, including a hat-trick from Rush which tied him with Trevor Ford and Allchurch as Wales' leading goalscorer of all-time. After defeating Cyprus, Wales faced back-to-back matches against Belgium. The first game ended in a defeat before Wales won the second, Rush becoming the leading goalscorer with his 24th international goal while Ryan Giggs scored his first.

Yorath led his team to four further qualifying matches without defeat, beating both Cyprus and the Faroe Islands and drawing both ties against the Representation of Czechs and Slovaks. (Note: The Dissolution of Czechoslovakia occurred during the qualifying campaign for the 1994 World Cup. As a result, the two sides continued the campaign under the title of the Representation of Czechs and Slovaks.) Wales faced a deciding game against Romania in their final match, with four teams in the group still able to qualify depending on the results, with a win almost guaranteeing qualification. (Note: If the Representation of Czechs and Slovaks defeated Belgium by one goal, Wales would need to win by two clear goals. Wales would qualify if they won under any other circumstance.) Wales entered the game as the last Home Nation able to qualify, while the match received an intense build-up in the media. Romania took the lead early on when Gheorghe Hagi's shot slipped past Southall but Saunders equalised after an hour. The momentum of the game shifted towards Wales, with Giggs later commenting "Their (Romania) morale collapsed, and I could see from their body language that they didn't want to know." Two minutes later, Gary Speed was fouled in the area and Wales were awarded a penalty. Paul Bodin took the spot kick, but his effort struck the crossbar. Barry Horne remarked that "if the penalty had gone in, we would have run out 2–1 or 3–1 winners because they had folded." Instead, with Wales pushing forward for the winning goal, Romania added a second goal and won the match 2–1, ending Wales' hopes of qualifying. The match was further marred by the death of a supporter when a marine flare was fired inside the National Stadium, striking the fan in the neck. The Welsh side were left devastated by the defeat, Yorath sat in a stairwell at the National Stadium and wept, Giggs was pulled over for speeding on the way home from the game which he attributed to his mindset from the defeat while Speed described the result as "the most painful match of my career". Bodin, the penalty taker, never played for Wales again. Despite failing to qualify, Wales achieved the highest FIFA World ranking in their history at the time, reaching 27th place.

== Upheaval under Toshack, Smith and Gould ==
With his contract due to expire, Yorath made a request for a payrise for his new deal. The request was not well received by the FAW and Yorath lowered his request when told of budgetary constraints but was told he would have to reapply for his job. Yorath was ultimately informed that he would not be offered a new deal and the FAW eventually appointed John Toshack as the new manager, alongside his club role with Spanish side Real Sociedad. His appointment proved relatively unpopular among both players and fans, and in his first match Wales suffered a 3–1 defeat to Norway at Ninian Park. The defeat was largely attributed to the new playing style brought in by Toshack and, 48 days into his tenure, he stepped down from the role after a single match. At the time, Yorath was bringing a case of unfair dismissal against the FAW, but offered to drop the action if he was rehired. The FAW refused to consider him for the role and instead reappointed former manager Mike Smith; he had been Toshack's assistant during his brief spell. In his autobiography, Yorath later claimed that the FAW chose to replace him because they resented his popularity with the Welsh fans. Smith began his second spell with two friendlies, a defeat to Sweden and a victory over Estonia. Southall equalled Nicholas' caps record in the first match before surpassing it in the second.

With many new nations gaining independence following the breakups of the Soviet Union and Yugoslavia, Wales faced three opponents for the first time in qualifying for the 1996 European Championships, Georgia, Albania and Moldova, along with Bulgaria and Germany. Wales secured a 2–0 victory over Albania in their opening match, but suffered back-to-back defeats against the other two new sides, including a heavy 5–0 loss to Georgia. Two defeats to Bulgaria led to Smith coming under increasing pressure and, despite earning a point away to Germany in April 1995, his contract was terminated after a 1–0 loss to Georgia. His replacement was Bobby Gould, who secured a victory over Moldova in his first match before ending the campaign with a defeat to Germany and a draw with Georgia.

Gould's first full qualifying campaign as manager started inauspiciously as warm-up matches proved troublesome. A defeat to Italy in January 1996 saw both Rush and Phillips retire from international duty, while a further defeat to Switzerland was preceded by a falling out between Gould and Hughes. Further embarrassment was added when Wales suffered a 2–1 defeat against Fourth Division side Leyton Orient in May 1996 despite fielding a full strength side. Qualifying however began more positively as Wales defeated San Marino 5–0 and 6–0 in their opening fixtures, with Hughes returning to score four goals across the games. However, back-to-back fixtures against group favourites the Netherlands proved much more difficult; after losing 3–1 in Cardiff, Wales suffered their heaviest defeat in a competitive fixture in the return match, losing 7–1. Gould finally resigned following a 4–0 defeat to Italy in 1999.

== The Welsh Revolution ==
Mark Hughes, a former Welsh international footballer, embarked on a managerial journey that would leave an indelible mark on Welsh football. Serving as the manager of the Wales national team from 1999 to 2004, Hughes played a pivotal role in transforming the fortunes of Welsh football and instilling a renewed sense of belief and ambition within the squad. Through his strategic acumen, astute player selection, and emphasis on teamwork, Hughes led Wales to significant milestones and set the stage for future successes.

During his tenure, Hughes demonstrated a keen eye for identifying talent and nurturing young players. He successfully integrated emerging talents, such as Ryan Giggs, Craig Bellamy, and Simon Davies, into the national team, providing them with valuable international experience and enabling their growth as key contributors. This emphasis on youth development and player progression laid the foundation for a sustainable future for Welsh football. His ability to foster unity and camaraderie within the squad, creating a positive team environment that allowed players to express themselves on the field. His man-management skills and ability to create a cohesive unit helped Wales to maximize their potential and achieve notable results against formidable opponents.

Under Hughes' guidance, Wales experienced a resurgence in international football, culminating in their qualification for the 2000 UEFA European Championship and their near-miss for the 2004 UEFA European Championship. These achievements marked a significant turnaround for Welsh football, which had struggled to make a mark on the international stage for several decades. Hughes' tactical nous and ability to galvanize the team played a crucial role in securing these qualifications. Hughes implemented a well-organized and disciplined defensive structure, which enabled Wales to compete against stronger opponents. His focus on defensive solidity and disciplined team shape allowed Wales to neutralize opposition attacks while capitalizing on counter-attacking opportunities. This strategic shift revitalized Welsh football and contributed to their successful qualification campaigns.

Beyond his immediate impact, Hughes' tenure as Wales manager has left a long-lasting legacy. By instilling a winning mentality and raising expectations, he rekindled the nation's passion for football. The newfound optimism and belief in the team's capabilities translated into increased support from fans and greater investment in grassroots football across Wales. The success and style of play implemented by Hughes served as an inspiration for future generations of Welsh footballers. The progress made under his management laid the groundwork for subsequent managers, including Chris Coleman and Ryan Giggs, who built upon the foundation Hughes had established. Wales' qualification for the UEFA European Championship in 2016 and their journey to the semi-finals demonstrated the lasting impact of Hughes' tenure and the subsequent growth of Welsh football.

Hughes quit the Welsh national side in September 2004 to take charge of Blackburn in the FA Premier League, the last club he had played for.

== John Toshack's disastrous return ==
John Toshack's return as Wales manager in 2004 came at a time when the national team was undergoing a transitional phase. The squad was experiencing a decline in talent and struggled to replicate previous successes. Toshack inherited a team lacking in quality and depth, making his task of rejuvenating the side an uphill battle. Toshack faced challenges in terms of player availability due to injuries and retirements, further hampering his ability to build a cohesive and competitive team. The lack of a strong talent pool and the absence of key players contributed to the underwhelming performances during his second tenure.

During his second run as Wales manager, John Toshack failed to achieve the desired results on the pitch. The team's performances were characterized by inconsistency, disjointed play, and a lack of cohesion. Despite occasional bright moments, the overall performance of the national team under Toshack's leadership fell well below expectations. Toshack's tactical choices, including experimental formations and frequent changes in personnel, which often disrupted the team's rhythm and hindered their ability to develop a consistent playing style. The team struggled to produce positive results and failed to make a significant impact in qualifying campaigns.

Toshack's second tenure was marred by strained relationships with some players and public criticism of their commitment and performances. These issues further contributed to the decline and lack of progress under his leadership. Increased tensions between Toshack and certain players, including Craig Bellamy, became public knowledge, leading to a fractured team environment. The dissatisfaction among players and the public scrutiny affected team morale and further hindered Wales' progress under Toshack's management.

One of the most significant markers of John Toshack's second run as Wales manager was the team's failure to qualify for major international tournaments. Despite the aspirations and hopes of Welsh football fans, Toshack's tenure yielded no notable achievements in terms of qualifying for major competitions. The lack of progress and failure to qualify for tournaments like the UEFA European Championship or the FIFA World Cup left fans disappointed. The team's inability to compete at the highest level compounded the frustration surrounding Toshack's second stint as manager.

== Speed's reform and revitalisation ==
With just four months managerial experience, Speed was confirmed as the new Welsh national team manager on 14 December 2010 succeeding John Toshack who had stepped down in September 2010. Sheffield United released Speed from his contract after compensation was paid by the FAW. Former Welsh national team manager Mark Hughes supported the move to appoint Speed, saying, "He's got a strong personality, he's good with people, (the players) will relate better to Gary than they perhaps did to the previous manager."

Speed's first game as Wales manager was 8 February 2011 in the inaugural Nations Cup, which the Republic of Ireland won 3–0. Speed's first competitive match was the Euro 2012 qualifier at home to England 26 March 2011 and Speed appointed twenty-year-old Aaron Ramsey captain, making Ramsey the youngest ever Wales captain. Wales lost to England 2–0, and in August 2011 Wales attained their lowest ever FIFA ranking of 117th. This was followed by a 2–1 home win against Montenegro, a 1–0 away loss to England, a 2–0 home win against Switzerland and a 1–0 away win against Bulgaria. Consequently, in October 2011, Wales were ranked 45th in the world by FIFA. Speed's last game as manager of Wales was on 12 November 2011, a 4–1 home win in a friendly match against Norway. On 21 December 2011, the day of the final FIFA rankings of the year, Wales were awarded the title of 'Best Movers' of the year having gained more ranking points than any other nation in 2011.

=== Death ===
His tenure as manager ended in tragic circumstances two weeks later when he was found dead at his home on 27 November, having apparently committed suicide. News of Speed's death was first announced by the Football Association of Wales, who extended their sympathies and condolences to Speed's family. Throughout the day similar messages were released from many people within football, as well as national figures in Wales and the rest of the United Kingdom. Close friends and former teammates such as Robbie Savage, Ryan Giggs, Simon Grayson, Alan Shearer, Craig Bellamy and John Hartson all expressed their deep sorrow at his death. Many British politicians expressed sadness at Speed's death and sent condolences to his family, including Prime Minister David Cameron and Leader of the Opposition Ed Miliband. Among the international figures to pay tribute to Speed was UEFA President Michel Platini. FIFA President Sepp Blatter described Speed as "a model professional and a fantastic ambassador for the game". Both the FIFA and Welsh flags at FIFA's headquarters were at half mast as a mark of respect.

=== Impact on Welsh football ===
Speed's work to improve the professional standard of the Football Association of Wales, including improvements to training facilities, team culture, and its national visibility, was credited as a major contributor to the success that Wales would enjoy in the decade after his death, beginning with their qualification for Euro 2016 and culminating in their appearance at the 2022 FIFA World Cup in Qatar, bringing to an end a 64-year drought at the World Cup. His memory became part of "the sense of collective purpose" of the organization. On the eve of the Qatar World Cup, Speed's former teammate Neville Southall wrote that the biggest difference between the Welsh squad that had qualified and those that came before started "with a single word: belief," and that "for the initial source of the belief, though, you have to go back to my old mate Gary Speed. Gary had a burning ambition to take Wales into a tournament and, in his time as manager, he made players believe in themselves." Wales captain Gareth Bale paid tribute to Speed on the occasion, saying "Gary Speed's vision was to grow the FAW, not just the football, but the infrastructure: building a training base, having a high-performance centre and recovery centre, just like a top club," adding "I'm sure he's looking down on us with a big smile and happy that Welsh football is in a great place."

== Coleman's 'golden' era ==
On 19 January 2012, Coleman was appointed team manager of the Wales national team, as successor to his friend Gary Speed, who had died the previous November. After letting his assistant Osian Roberts take charge in Speed's memorial match against Costa Rica in February, his first game in charge was a 2–0 defeat against Mexico at the MetLife Stadium in New Jersey on 27 May.

Wales' first match in 2014 FIFA World Cup qualification was on 7 September at home to Belgium, with centre back James Collins sent off for a late lunge on Guillaume Gillet in the 25th minute of an eventual 0–2 loss. Four days later in Novi Sad, the team lost 6–1 to Serbia; Coleman said in October 2015 that he considered leaving his post after the defeat. After becoming the first Welsh manager to lose his first five games, Coleman got his first win on 12 October 2012, a 2–1 victory against Scotland. On 26 March 2013, in a qualifier against Croatia at the Liberty Stadium, Wales led 1–0 for the majority of the game through a Gareth Bale penalty, but two late goals from the opponents ended any hopes of qualification. In October 2015, Coleman led Wales to their best ever position on the FIFA World Rankings, 8th.

=== Euro 2016 ===
After reaching the Euro 2016 semi-final, the Wales National Football Team return to Wales for an open-top bus parade through Cardiff city centre. Wales qualified for Euro 2016 in France, their first European Championship tournament, and were drawn into Group B with Slovakia, Russia and England. On their Euro debut, on 11 June against Slovakia at the Nouveau Stade de Bordeaux, Gareth Bale scored direct from a free-kick to give Wales a 1–0 lead, and Hal Robson-Kanu scored the winner in a 2–1 victory that put them top of the group. In their second match, against England in Lens, Wales led 1–0 at half-time through another Bale free-kick, but lost 2–1. Against Russia at the Stadium Municipal in Toulouse, Aaron Ramsey, Neil Taylor and Bale scored in a 3–0 win that made them win the group.

In their round of 16 match at the Parc des Princes in Paris, Wales played Northern Ireland and won 1–0 after Bale's cross was put in as an own goal by Gareth McAuley. In the quarter-final against Belgium, Wales went behind to a long-range effort from Radja Nainggolan, but captain Ashley Williams headed an equaliser before Hal Robson-Kanu and Sam Vokes confirmed a 3–1 victory for Wales. This victory advanced Wales to their first major tournament semi-final and also made them the first British nation to advance to the semi-finals of a major tournament since England did so at Euro 1996 as hosts.

The first half of the semi-final against Portugal in Lyon went goalless, but goals from Cristiano Ronaldo and Nani early in the second half saw Portugal claim a 2–0 win. Wales were welcomed back home on 8 July with an open-top bus parade around Cardiff, starting at Cardiff Castle and going past the Millennium Stadium before finishing at the Cardiff City Stadium.

=== Post–Euro 2016 ===
On 23 May 2016, it was announced at a Football Association of Wales press conference that Coleman had signed a two-year contract extension to take in the 2018 World Cup qualifying campaign.

In September 2016, Wales opened their 2018 World Cup qualification campaign with a comfortable 4–0 home win against Moldova. However, they followed this with a run of five consecutive draws away to Austria, at home to Georgia, both home and away against Serbia and away to the Republic of Ireland. That run came to an end with a 1–0 home victory over Austria on 2 September 2017, followed by a 2–0 away victory against Moldova on 5 September and a 1–0 away win over Georgia on 6 October. Wales finished third in their group due to a 1–0 loss to the Republic of Ireland on 9 October and failed to qualify for the 2018 FIFA World Cup play-offs. Chris Coleman resigned as Wales team manager on 17 November 2017 and was appointed team manager at Sunderland.

== Rocky times under Giggs ==
Giggs was appointed manager of the Wales national team on 15 January 2018 on a four-year contract, succeeding Chris Coleman, who had left the role to take up the manager's position at Sunderland the previous November. His first match in charge was in a 6–0 win over China during the 2018 China Cup, where Gareth Bale broke the all-time scoring record previously held by Ian Rush. Later that year, Wales participated in the UEFA Nations League, finishing behind Denmark with six points. In 2019, Wales had a slow start to their qualifying group, only accruing three points from three matches. However, they went unbeaten for the rest of the year, culminating in a 2–0 win over Hungary and securing qualification for UEFA Euro 2020. The resulting tournament was delayed due to the COVID-19 pandemic, and the next time that Giggs would manage the national team was behind closed doors during the UEFA Nations League campaign. His final match in charge was a 1–0 win over Bulgaria.

In November 2020, Giggs was arrested on suspicion of assaulting two women, which led to his temporary stepping aside from his role as Wales manager. BBC News reported on the arrest and subsequent court proceedings. Rob Page took charge as interim manager during Giggs' absence. Page guided Wales through the UEFA Nations League and the European Championship qualifying campaign.

== The new era under Rob Page ==
Page became the caretaker-manager of the Wales senior team on 3 November 2020, following Giggs's arrest. Page oversaw a 0–0 draw with the United States in a friendly, as well as UEFA Nations League wins over the Republic of Ireland and Finland that secured Wales promotion out of League B as winners of Group 4. With Giggs on extended leave, Page continued to deputise in his place for the three international games in March 2021.

=== Euro 2020 ===
After Giggs was charged with assault in April 2021, it was confirmed that Page would manage Wales at the delayed UEFA Euro 2020 finals. Wales qualified out of Group A in second-place with a 1–1 draw with Switzerland, 2–0 win over Turkey and 1–0 defeat to Italy. Rob Page guided Wales to a commendable performance in the Euro 2020 tournament. Despite the challenges of a tough group. They went on to be eliminated at the Round of 16 stage following a 4–0 defeat to Denmark. Nevertheless, their achievements in the tournament were highly praised.

=== 2022 FIFA World Cup ===
For 2022 World Cup qualification, Wales were drawn in Group E with Belgium, Czech Republic, Belarus and Estonia with Page again acting as interim manager. Wales finished second in Group E and progressed to the qualification play-off stage. On 5 June 2022, Page led Wales to a 1–0 win over Ukraine in the European qualification play-off final, to qualify for the 2022 FIFA World Cup, the country's first World Cup appearance since 1958. Fifteen days later, Giggs resigned ahead of his trial, making Page the permanent manager until the end of the World Cup. In September 2022, Page signed a four-year contract with the Football Association of Wales. Wales were eliminated from the World Cup in the group stage, having won just one point; they came from behind to earn a 1–1 draw against the United States, before losing 2–0 to Iran and 3–0 to England. Page said that his team had failed to show their "true colours" in Qatar.

=== Euro 2024 qualifying ===
On 9 January 2023, Wales captain Gareth Bale retired from club and international football. At the time of his retirement he was the record goal scorer and record cap holder for the Welsh team. Aaron Ramsey was subsequently appointed Wales captain. Gareth Bale's retirement spurred a series of international retirements from experienced players, on 7 February 2023, Joe Allen became the first to retire from international football since Bale announced his own. On 9 March 2023, Chris Gunter followed Allen in confirming he had retired from international football, having earned 109 caps. It was announced 12 days later that Gunter would take up a coaching role within Page's backroom staff. On 12 March 2023, Jonny 'Joniesta' Williams announced his retirement from his international duties, ending the streak of experienced players retiring and ending his 9-year stint in the red and white shirt.

Wales were drawn into Group D along with Armenia, Croatia, Latvia, and Turkey, for qualifying for the UEFA Euro 2024. Wales kicked off their qualifying campaign against Croatia, on 25 March 2023, resulting in a 1–1 draw through a well-worked Nathan Broadhead goal, where he came on off the bench and scored with his first touch in the 90th+1 minute. Wales second match was against Latvia on 28 March 2023, they took home all three points, thanks to Welsh talisman Kieffer Moore, who netted a superb finish during the first half.

Wales played against Armenia on 16 June 2023, they lost the match by 4–2 to Armenia. The Wales's goalscorers was Daniel James and Harry Wilson. The Welsh striker Kieffer Moore received a red card during the match. Wales travelled to play against Turkey on 18 June 2023. They lost the match by 2–0, but during the match, midfielder Joe Morrell received a red card.

Wales travelled to Riga to play against Latvia on 11 September 2023. They won the match by 2—0, the goalscorers was Aaron Ramsey and David Brooks.

Wales played against Croatia on 15 October 2023. They won the match by 2–1, the goalscorer was Harry Wilson who scored two goals on his 50th appearance for playing for Wales.

Wales travelled to play Armenia on 18 November 2023, the final score was 1—1 draw, the goalscorers was Armenia's players Lucas Zelarayán and own goal by Nair Tiknizyan. Wales played a home match against Turkey on the 21 November 2023, the final score was 1—1, Wales's goalscorer was Neco Williams, and Turkey's goalscorer was Yusuf Yazici. Wales finished in third place of Group D, they are due to play in the play-offs for qualifying place in the final tournament of the UEFA Euro 2024.

Wales are placed into Path A, alongside Poland, Estonia, and Finland, in the UEFA Euro 2024 qualifying play-offs, the matches are due to take place in March 2024.

Wales played in the semi-final match against Finland at the Cardiff City Stadium in Cardiff, Wales, on the 21 March 2024. Wales won the semi-final match by 4—1, the Wales's goalscorers was David Brooks, Neco Williams, Brennan Johnson, and Daniel James. The Finland's goalscorer was Teemu Pukki.

Wales are due to play Poland in the Path A play-offs final match on 26 March 2024 at Cardiff City Stadium, Cardiff. The team who win Path A final will enter Group D of the final tournament of the UEFA Euro 2024. Wales lost the play-off final to Poland on penalties and did not qualify for final place in UEFA Euro 2024.

In June 2024, it was announced that Rob Page was sacked as Wales' manager.

== Craig Bellamy's as Head Coach Era ==
Craig Bellamy was announced as the head coach of the Welsh national team on 9 July 2024.

== See also ==
- List of Cardiff City F.C. internationals
- List of Swansea City A.F.C. internationals

== Bibliography ==
- Davies, Gareth M; Garland, Ian (1991). Who's Who of Welsh International Soccer Players. Bridge Books. ISBN 978-1-872424-11-8.
- Stead, Phil (2013). Red Dragons – The Story of Welsh Football. Ceredigion: Y Llofa. ISBN 978-1-84771-468-8.
