= History of the Wales national football team =

The history of the Wales national football team spans the period from 1876, when the side played its first international fixture, to the present time. For detail on individual periods of the team's history, see one of the following articles:

- History of the Wales national football team (1876–1976)
- History of the Wales national football team (1977–present)
