= List of Swansea City A.F.C. internationals =

This list comprises Swansea City A.F.C. players who have attained a full international cap whilst playing for Swansea. Players who gained their first international cap after leaving Swansea are not included.

== Players ==
As of 14 July 2015

Legend	Meaning
♦	Player currently playing for Swansea City
‡	Player who represented their country at the FIFA World Cup whilst playing for Swansea City

Key to positions

- GK — Goalkeeper
- DF — Defender
- MF — Midfielder
- FW — Forward

Player	Nation	Position (Note: For a full description of positions see Association football positions.)	Caps	Goals	International years	Swansea years	Ref.
Radanfah Abu Bakr	Trinidad and Tobago	DF	20	1	2009–	2009–2010	
Reuben Agboola	Nigeria	DF	9	0	1991–1993	1991–1993	
Ivor Allchurch	Wales ‡	FW	68	23	1950–1966	1947–1958; 1965–1968	
Len Allchurch	Wales ‡	MF	11	1	1955–1963	1950–1961; 1969–1971	
Joe Allen	Wales	MF	21	0	2009–	2007–2012	
Modou Barrow ♦	Gambia	FW	2	0	2015–	2014–	
Hughie Blair	Ireland	FW	4	0	1928–1933	1932–1937	
Wilfried Bony	Ivory Coast ‡	FW	42	13	2010–	2013–2015	
Jason Bowen	Wales	FW	2	0	1994–1996	1990–1995	
Walter Boyd	Jamaica	FW	66	19	1991–2001	1999–2001	
Ronnie Briggs	Northern Ireland	GK	2	0	1962–1965	1964–1965	
Jeremy Charles	Wales	FW	19	1	1980–1986	1976–1983	
Mel Charles	Wales ‡	MF	31	6	1955–1962	1952–1959	
John Cornforth	Wales	MF	2	0	1995	1991–1996	
David Cotterill	Wales	MF	22	2	2005–	2009–2012	
Alan Curtis	Wales	FW	35	6	1976–1987	1972–1979; 1980–1983; 1989–1990	
Alan Davies	Wales	MF	13	0	1983–1990	1987–1989; 1990–1992	
Ben Davies	Wales	DF	13	0	2012–	2012–2014	
Dai Davies	Wales	GK	52	0	1975–1982	1969–1970; 1974; 1981–1983	
Willie Davies	Wales	MF	17	6	1924–1930	1921–1924; 1933–1936	
Jonathan de Guzmán	Netherlands ‡	MF	14	0	2013–	2012–2014	
Richard Duffy	Wales	DF	13	0	2005–2008	2001–2004; 2007	
Noel Dwyer	Republic of Ireland	GK	14	0	1959–1964	1960–1965	
Christian Edwards	Wales	DF	1	0	1996	1994–1998; 2005	
Brian Evans	Wales	MF	7	0	1971–1973	1963–1973	
Roy Evans	Wales	DF	1	0	1964	1962–1968	
Łukasz Fabiański ♦	Poland	GK	23	0	2006–	2014–	
Jim Feeney	Ireland	DF	2	0	1946–1949	1946–1950	
Warren Feeney	Northern Ireland	FW	46	5	2002–2011	2007	
Federico Fernández ♦	Argentina	DF	32	3	2011–	2014–	
Trevor Ford	Wales	FW	38	23	1946–1957	1946–1947	
Jack Fowler	Wales	FW	6	3	1925–1928	1924–1930	
Roger Freestone	Wales	GK	1	0	2000	1989; 1991–2004	
David Giles	Wales	MF	12	2	1980–1983	1980–1982	
Harry Griffiths	Wales	MF	1	0	1953	1949–1964	
Harry Hanford	Wales	DF	7	0	1933–1939	1927–1935	
Barrie Hole	Wales	MF	30	0	1963–1970	1970–1972	
Billy Hole	Wales	MF	9	1	1921–1928	1920–1929	
Billy Humphries	Northern Ireland	MF	14	1	1962–1965	1964–1968	
Leighton James	Wales	FW	54	10	1971–1983	1980–1983	
Robbie James	Wales	MF	47	7	1978–1988	1973–1983; 1988–1990	
Steve Jenkins	Wales	DF	16	0	1995–2001	1990–1995	
Roy John	Wales	DF	14	0	1931–1938	1927–1928; 1937–1939	
Mike Johnson	Wales	MF	1	0	1964	1959–1966	
Barrie Jones	Wales	MF	15	2	1962–1969	1959–1964	
Cliff Jones	Wales ‡	FW	59	16	1954–1969	1952–1958	
Ernie Jones	Wales	MF	4	0	1946–1948	1943–1947	
Ivor Jones	Wales	FW	10	1	1920–1926	1920–1922	
Owain Tudur Jones	Wales	MF	7	0	2008–	2005–2009	
Rory Keane	Ireland; Republic of Ireland	DF	5	0	1948–1949	1947–1955	
John King	Wales	GK	1	0	1954	1950–1964	
Alan Knill	Wales	DF	1	0	1988	1987–1989	
Shefki Kuqi	Finland	FW	62	8	1999–2010	2010–2011	
Dennis Lawrence	Trinidad and Tobago	DF	89	5	2000–2009	2006–2009	
Sid Lawrence	Wales	DF	8	0	1931–1935	1931–1936	
Dudley Lewis	Wales	DF	1	0	1983	1980–1989	
Wilf Lewis	Wales	FW	6	3	1927–1929	1925–1928	
Billy Lucas	Wales	MF	7	0	1948–1950	1948–1953	
Yves Ma-Kalambay	DR Congo	GK	2	0	2010–	2010–2011	
Shaun MacDonald	Wales	MF	2	0	2010–	2005–2011	
John Mahoney	Wales	MF	51	1	1967–1983	1979–1983	
Chris Marustik	Wales	MF	6	0	1982	1978–1985	
Jim McLaughlin	Northern Ireland	FW	12	6	1961–1966	1963–1967; 1972–1974	
Terry Medwin	Wales	FW	30	6	1953–1963	1949–1956	
Andy Melville	Wales	DF	65	3	1989–2004	1986–1990	
Michu	Spain	FW	1	0	2013–	2012–2015	
Jefferson Montero ♦	Ecuador	MF	49	9	2010–	2014–	
Ernie Morley	Wales	DF	4	1	1925–1929	1924–1925	
Dai Nicholas	Wales	FW	3	0	1921–1924	1924–1929	
Mel Nurse	Wales	DF	12	0	1960–1961	1955–1962; 1968–1971	
Jackie O'Driscoll	Ireland; Republic of Ireland	MF	6	0	1948–1949	1947–1952	
Des Palmer	Wales	FW	3	3	1957	1952–1959	
Jack Parry	Wales	GK	1	0	1951	1946–1951	
Colin Pascoe	Wales	MF	10	0	1988–1989	1983–1988; 1992–1996	
Roy Paul	Wales	DF	33	1	1949–1956	1939–1950	
Leighton Phillips	Wales	DF	58	0	1971–1981	1978–1981	
Tamás Priskin	Hungary	FW	48	15	2005–	2011	
Jazz Richards	Wales	MF	5	0	2012–	2009–2015	
Sam Ricketts	Wales	DF	52	0	2005–	2004–2006	
Giovanni Savarese	Venezuela	FW	30	10	1989–2001	2000–2001	
Jason Scotland	Trinidad and Tobago	FW	41	8	2000–2011	2007–2009	
Frank Scrine	Wales	FW	2	0	1949–1950	1947–1954	
Itay Shechter	Israel	FW	23	4	2009–	2012–2013	
Gylfi Sigurðsson ♦	Iceland	MF	30	9	2010–	2012; 2014–	
Nigel Stevenson	Wales	DF	4	0	1982	1975–1987	
Ki Sung-yueng ♦	South Korea ‡	MF	73	4	2008–	2012–	
Neil Taylor ♦	Wales	DF	22	0	2010–	2010–	
David Thomas	Wales	DF	2	0	1957	1949–1958	
Dwight Tiendalli	Netherlands	DF	2	0	2013–	2012–2015	
Nathan Tjoe-A-On ♦	Indonesia	DF	5	0	2024–	2023–	
John Toshack	Wales	FW	40	13	1969–1980	1978–1984	
Michel Vorm	Netherlands ‡	GK	15	0	2008–	2011–2014	
Ian Walsh	Wales	FW	18	7	1979–1982	1982–1984	
Jack Warner	Wales	DF	2	0	1936–1939	1936–1939	
Ashley Williams ♦	Wales	DF	51	1	2008–	2008–	
Ben Williams	Wales	DF	10	0	1927–1935	1927–1930	
Graham Williams	Wales	MF	5	1	1961	1959–1963	
Herbie Williams	Wales	FW	3	0	1964–1971	1957–1975	
Tom Williams	Cyprus	DF	1	0	2006	2006–2007	
