= List of Cardiff City F.C. internationals =

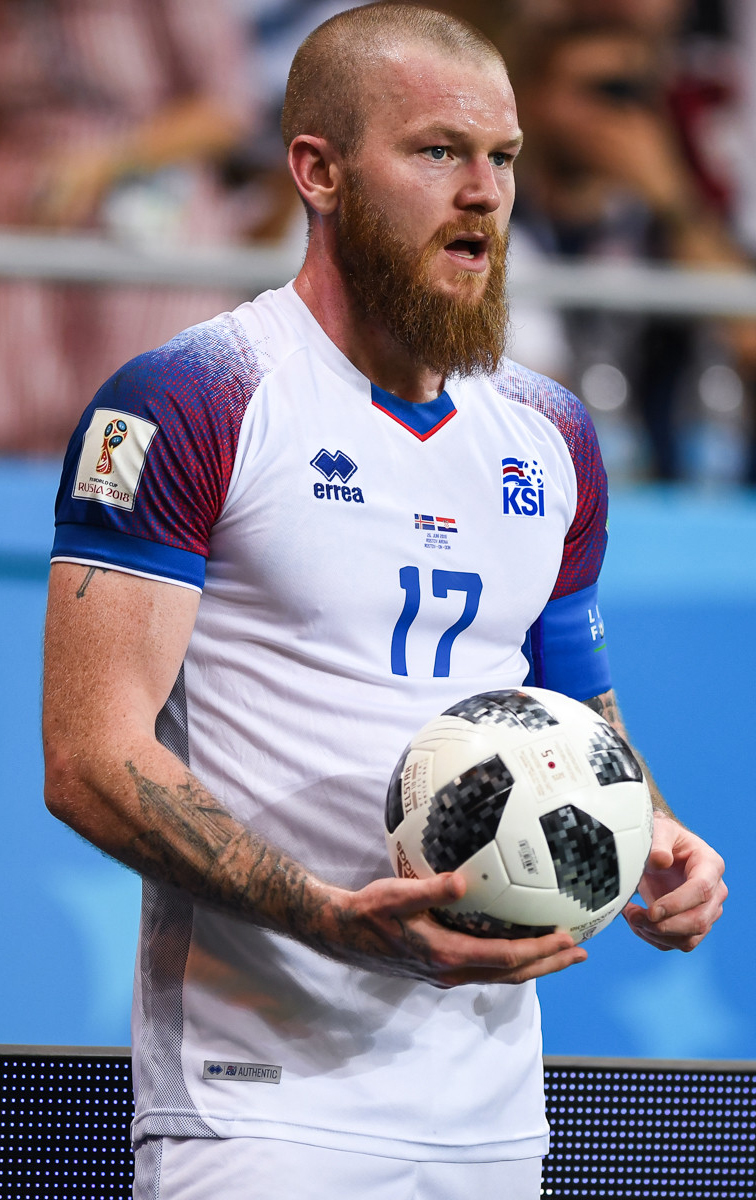
Icelandic midfielder Aron Gunnarsson is Cardiff's most-capped international player.

Cardiff City Football Club is a Welsh professional association football team based in Cardiff. The club was founded in 1899 and initially played in local amateur leagues before joining the English football league system. After spending a decade in the Southern Football League, Cardiff joined the Football League in 1920. In April 1912, Jack Evans became the first Cardiff player to be capped in an international match when he played for Wales against Ireland. George Latham was the only other Cardiff player to play in an international match before the First World War. Fred Keenor was the first player to win a cap after the war, in March 1920, while Jimmy Blair became the first Cardiff player to represent a country other than Wales when he played for Scotland against Ireland later the same year. Bert Smith became the first Irish international at the club the following year. Keenor attained 31 caps during his time with Cardiff, becoming the club's highest capped player prior to the Second World War. Goalkeeper Tom Farquharson remains the only Cardiff player to have appeared for two international sides, having represented both Ireland and the Irish Free State in the 1920s.

Alf Sherwood became the club's highest capped international player following the end of the Second World War. Having made his debut for Wales in 1946, he surpassed Keenor's total and amassed 39 caps while a Cardiff player. Wales qualified for its first major international tournament at the 1958 FIFA World Cup. Five Cardiff players were selected in the nation's 23-man squad for the competition: Colin Baker, Ron Hewitt, Ken Jones, Derrick Sullivan and Graham Vearncombe. Sullivan became the first Cardiff player to feature in a World Cup during Wales' opening fixture against Hungary. Baker and Hewitt also played in the competition, while goalkeepers Jones and Vearncombe remained unused reserves. In 2003, Australian defender Tony Vidmar became the first Cardiff player to represent a country from outside the British Isles. The final nation of the British Isles to have a representative from Cardiff was England, when Jay Bothroyd won a single cap in 2010. Icelandic midfielder Aron Gunnarsson overtook Sherwood to become the club's most capped international player in 2016. He went on to win 62 caps before leaving the club in 2019.

A total of 145 players have won at least one cap in senior international football while playing for Cardiff, representing 33 nations. Chris Gunter is the youngest Cardiff player to win an international cap, having represented Wales in 2007 at the age of 16. Kenwyne Jones has scored more international goals than any other Cardiff player. He scored ten times for Trinidad and Tobago between 2014 and 2016.

== Key ==
- Players are arranged by alphabetical order of surname.
- Appearances as a substitute are included. This feature of the game was introduced in the Football League at the start of the 1965–66 season.
- Statistics are correct as of 17 November 2026.

Positions key (Note: For more information, see Formation)
Pre-1960s		1960s–	
GK	Goalkeeper		
FB	Full back	DF	Defender
HB	Half back	MF	Midfielder
FW	Forward		

Nationality
Unless otherwise noted, the nationality of a player is determined by the country/countries which he has played for.
Position
Playing positions are listed according to the tactical formations that were employed at the time. Thus, the change in the names of defence and midfield positions reflects the tactical evolution that occurred from the 1960s onwards.
Cardiff years
Club career is defined as the first and last calendar years in which the player appeared for the club in any senior competition.
International years and caps
International years indicates the year of the player's first and last caps while a Cardiff player. Caps included are for the number won by the player during his time with Cardiff and may not be the full total of the player's career.

Key
Symbol	Meaning
‡	Player still at the club

== Players ==
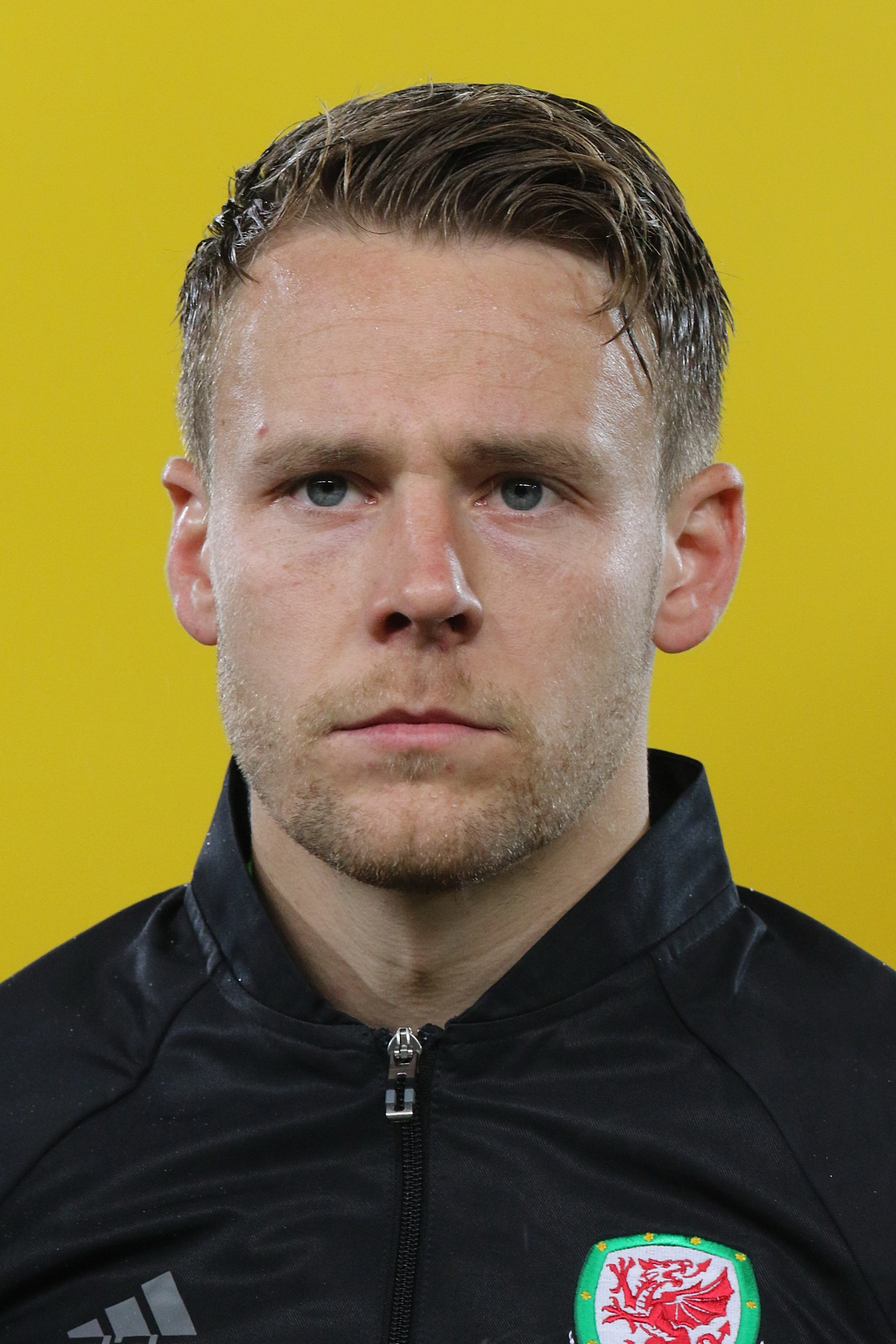
Chris Gunter is the youngest Cardiff player to have won an international cap.

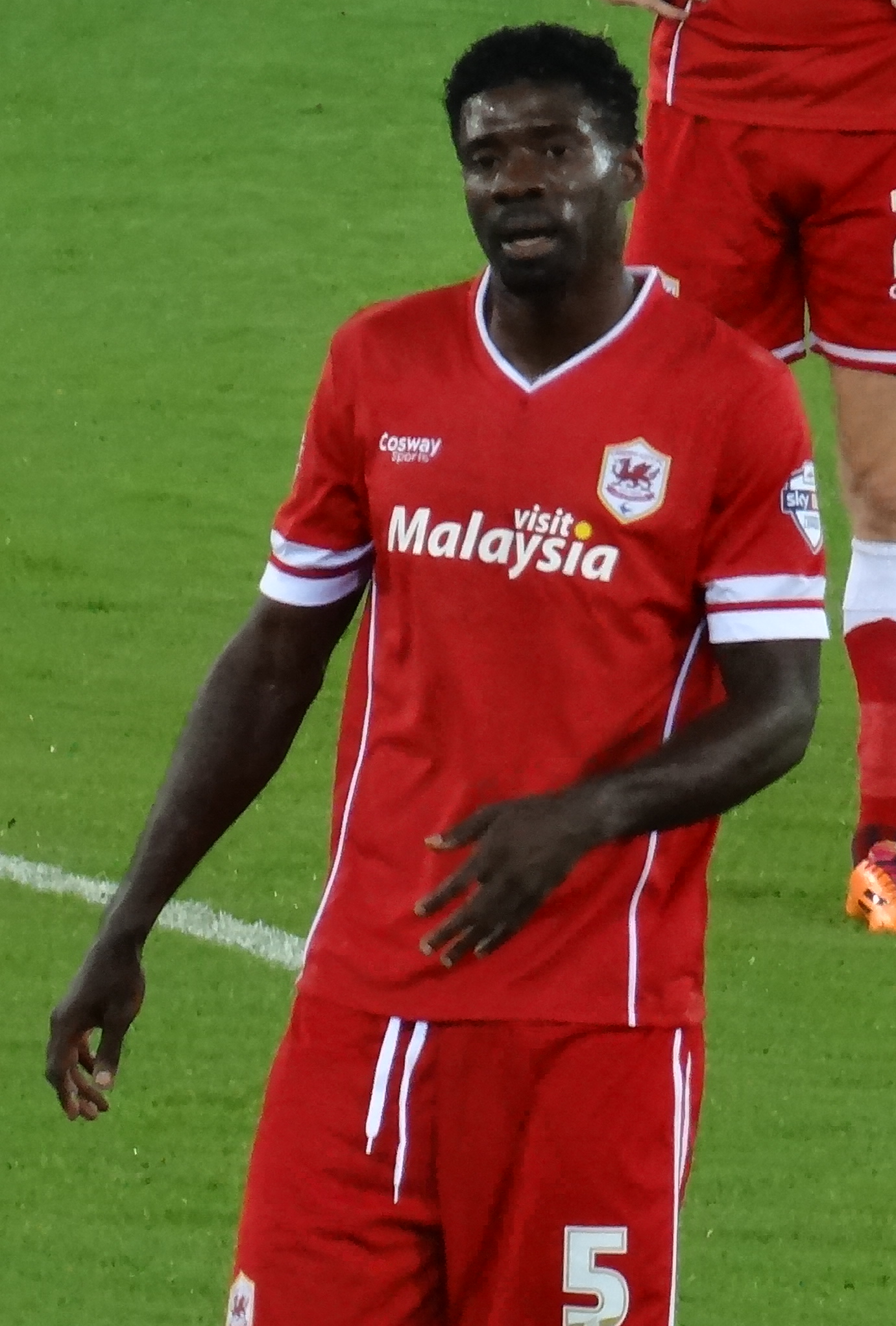
Bruno Ecuele Manga won more than 30 caps for Gabon while a Cardiff player.

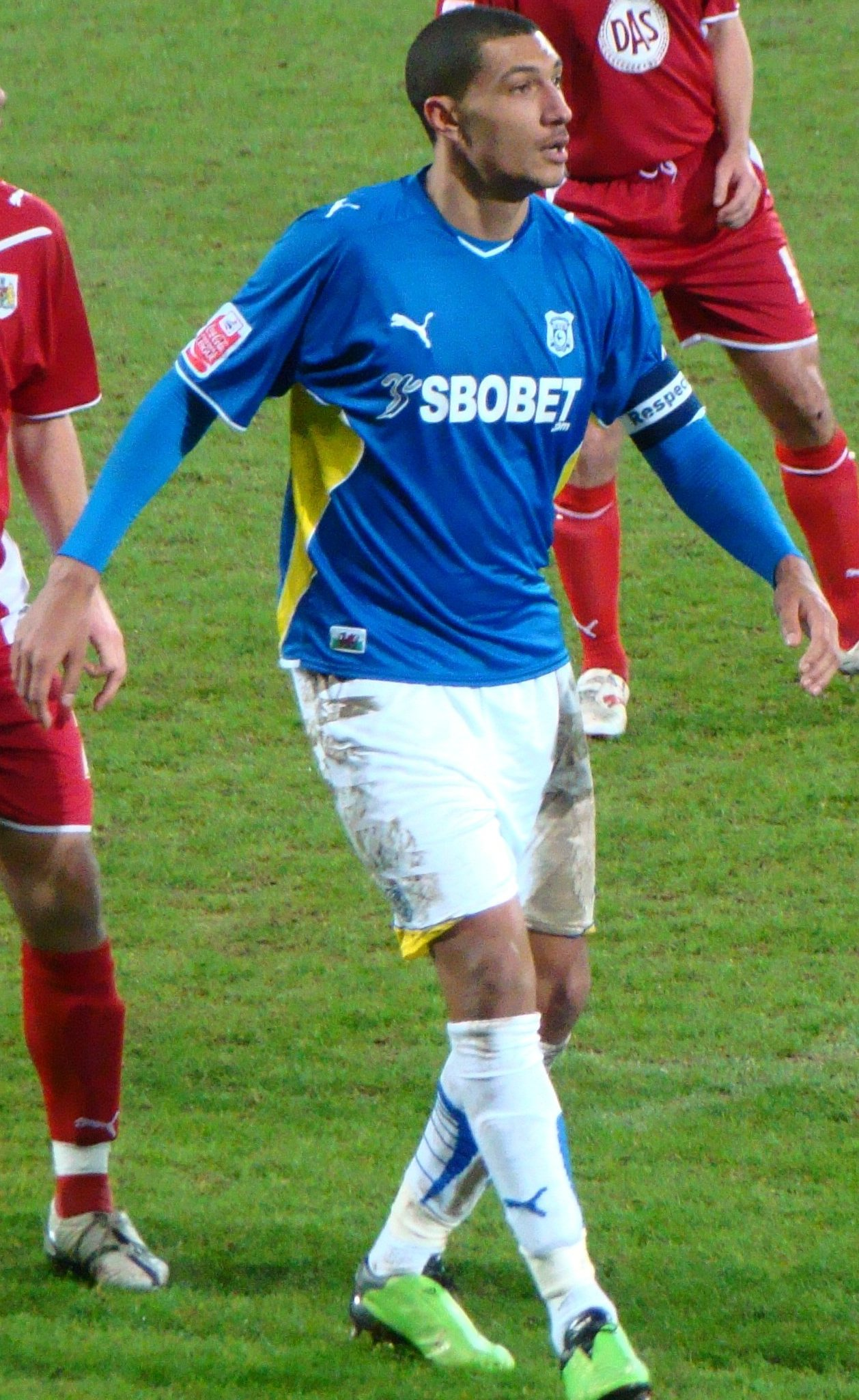
Jay Bothroyd is the only player to have represented England while a Cardiff player.

As of 14 November 2026

List of Cardiff City F.C. players making full international appearances (Note: Statistics are sourced from items listed in the bibliography section to the date of publication. Statistics from 2010 onwards are sourced from Soccerway.)
Name	Nation	Position	Cardiff years	Intl. years	Caps	Goals	Ref
Ebou Adams	Gambia	MF	2023–2024	2023–2024	5	0	
Mark Aizlewood	Wales	DF	1993–1995	1994	1	0	
Neil Alexander	Scotland	GK	2001–2007	2006	3	0	
Ivor Allchurch	Wales	FW	1962–1965	1962–1965	12	6	
Harry Arter	Republic of Ireland	MF	2018–2019	2018–2019	3	0	
Leandro Bacuna	Curaçao	MF	2019–2022	2019–2022	13	2	
Joel Bagan ‡	Republic of Ireland	DF	2020–	2026–	2	0	
Colin Baker	Wales	WH	1953–1966	1958–1961	7	0	
Billy Baker	Wales	WH	1937–1955	1947	1	0	
Harry Beadles	Wales	FW	1924–1925	1925	2	0	
Craig Bellamy	Wales	FW	2010–2011 & 2012–2014	2010–2013	12	0	
Jimmy Blair	Scotland	DF	1920–1926	1920–1924	8	0	
Darcy Blake	Wales	DF	2005–2012	2010–2012	10	1	
Jay Bothroyd	England	FW	2008–2011	2010	1	0	
Ciaron Brown	Northern Ireland	DF	2018–2022	2019–2022	2	0	
Tony Capaldi	Northern Ireland	DF	2007–2010	2004–2007	1	0	
John Charles	Wales	FW	1963–1966	1950–1965	3	0	
Mel Charles	Wales	FW	1963–1966	1950–1965	4	4	
James Collins	Wales	DF	2000–2005	2004–2015	6	0	
James Collins	Republic of Ireland	FW	2021–2022	2021	4	0	
Jamilu Collins	Nigeria	DF	2022–2025	2023–24	4	0	
Joel Colwill ‡	Wales	MF	2024–	2025–	4	0	
Rubin Colwill ‡	Wales	MF	2021–	2021–	12	1	
Miguel Comminges	Guadeloupe	DF	2008–2011	2008–2011	8	0	
Craig Conway	Scotland	MF	2011–2014	2011–2013	3	0	
Don Cowie	Scotland	MF	2011–2014	2011–2012	7	0	
Alan Curtis	Wales	FW	1986–1989	1986–1987	1	0	
Ernie Curtis	Wales	FW	1926–1927 & 1933–1935	1927–1933	1	1	
Mats Møller Dæhli	Norway	MF	2013–2015	2013–2014	9	1	
Len Davies	Wales	FW	1919–1931	1922–1929	23	6	
Isaak Davies ‡	Wales	FW	2025–	2025–	2	0	
Willie Davies	Wales	FW	1924–1928	1924–1928	8	4	
Steve Derrett	Wales	DF	1967–1972	1969–1971	4	0	
Phil Dwyer	Wales	DF	1972–1985	1978–1979	10	2	
Robert Earnshaw	Wales	FW	1998–2004 & 2011–2013	2002–2012	18	7	
Bruno Ecuele Manga	Gabon	DF	2014–2019	2014–2019	35	2	
George Edwards	Wales	FW	1948–1955	1946–1949	6	1	
Peter Enckelman	Finland	GK	2008–2010	2008–2010	5	0	
Neil Etheridge	Philippines	GK	2017–2020	2017–2020	9	0	
Herbie Evans	Wales	MF	1920–1926	1922–1924	6	0	
Jack Evans	Wales	FW	1912–1926	1912–1923	8	1	
Len Evans	Wales	GK	1930–1933	1927–1933	2	0	
Tom Farquharson	Ireland (Note: Farquharson also won four caps for the Irish Free State national team, the precursor to the Republic of Ireland national football team.)	GK	1922–1935	1923–1925	7	0	
Warren Feeney	Northern Ireland	FW	2007–2010	2007–2010	14	3	
Trevor Ford	Wales	FW	1953–1956	1953–1956	10	1	
Danny Gabbidon	Wales	DF	2000–2005 & 2014–2015	2002–2014	19	0	
Rudy Gestede	Benin	FW	2011–2014	2013–2014	4	2	
Frédéric Gounongbe	Benin	FW	2016–2018	2016	1	1	
Marko Grujić	Serbia	MF	2018	2018	4	0	
Aron Gunnarsson	Iceland	MF	2011–2019	2011–2019	62	0	
Chris Gunter	Wales	DF	2006–2008	2007–2008	3	0	
Gábor Gyepes	Hungary	DF	2008–2012	2008–2009	3	0	
Alan Harrington	Wales	MF	1951–1966	1956–1961	11	0	
Mark Harris	Wales	FW	2017–2023	2021–2023	10	0	
Simon Haworth	Wales	FW	1995–1997	1997	1	0	
Ron Healey	Ireland	GK	1974–1982	1977–1980	3	0	
Ron Hewitt	Wales	FW	1957–1959	1958	5	1	
Junior Hoilett	Canada	MF	2016–2021	2016–2021	23	11	
Barrie Hole	Wales	MF	1959–1966	1963–1966	18	0	
Ethan Horvath ‡	United States	GK	2024–2025	2024	1	0	
Ron Howells	Wales	GK	1950–1957	1953	2	0	
Emyr Huws	Wales	MF	2016–2017	2016–2017	3	0	
Junichi Inamoto	Japan	MF	2004–2005	2004–2005	7	0	
Sam Irving	Ireland	FW	1926–1928	1926–1928	6	0	
Declan John	Wales	DF	2012–2017	2013–2014	2	0	
Eddie Johnson	United States	FW	2008–2009	2008–2009	1	0	
Barrie Jones	Wales	MF	1967–1970	1967–1969	7	1	
Kenwyne Jones	Trinidad and Tobago	FW	2014–2016	2014–2016	20	10	
Leslie Jones	Wales	FW	1929–1934	1933–1934	1	0	
Graham Kavanagh	Republic of Ireland	MF	2001–2005	2001–2005	7	0	
Fred Keenor	Wales	DF	1912–1931	1920–1931	31	2	
Dekel Keinan	Israel	DF	2011–2012	2011–2012	3	0	
Andy Keogh	Republic of Ireland	FW	2010–2011	2010–2011	3	0	
Kim Bo-kyung	South Korea	MF	2012–2015	2012–2015	18	1	
Filip Kiss	Slovakia	MF	2011–2016	2014–2016	8	0	
Jason Koumas	Wales	MF	2005–2006 & 2010–2011	2005–2006	3	0	
Ronan Kpakio ‡	Wales	DF	2025–	2025–	3	0	
George Latham	Wales	DF	1912–1913 & 1921	1912–1913	1	0	
Dylan Lawlor ‡	Wales	DF	2024–	2025–	6	0	
Alan Lee	Republic of Ireland	FW	2003–2006	2003–2006	6	0	
Joe Ledley	Wales	MF	2004–2010	2005–2010	32	2	
Andy Legg	Wales	DF	1998–2003	1998–2001	2	0	
Jack Lewis	Wales	WH	1924–1925	1925	1	0	
Josh Magennis	Northern Ireland	FW	2009–2010	2010	2	0	
Martyn Margetson	Wales	GK	2004–2007	2004	1	0	
David Marshall	Scotland	GK	2009–2016	2009–2016	22	0	
Adam Matthews	Wales	DF	2009–2011	2011	2	0	
Jimmy McCambridge	Ireland	FW	1930–1933	1930–1931	4	0	
Ross McCormack	Scotland	FW	2008–2010	2008–2010	4	1	
Kevin McNaughton	Scotland	DF	2006–2015	2006–2008	1	0	
Gary Medel	Chile	MF	2013–2014	2013–2014	14	1	
Kenny Miller	Scotland	FW	2011–2012	2011–2012	5	2	
Graham Moore	Wales	MF	1957–1961	1959–1961	5	1	
Kieffer Moore	Wales	FW	2020–2022	2020–2022	19	6	
Jack Moylan ‡	Republic of Ireland	MF	2026–	2026–	6	2	
Philip Mulryne	Northern Ireland	MF	2005–2007	2007	1	0	
Jimmy Nelson	Scotland	DF	1921–1930	1925–1930	4	0	
Jack Nicholls	Wales	MF	1924–1925	1924–1925	4	0	
Callum O'Dowda	Republic of Ireland	MF	2022–2025	2022–2025	9	1	
Paul Parry	Wales	MF	2004–2009	2004–2008	12	1	
Callum Paterson	Scotland	MF	2017–2020	2017–2020	7	0	
Jason Perry	Wales	DF	1987–1997	1994	1	0	
Leighton Phillips	Wales	DF	1967–1974	1971–1974	12	0	
Anthony Pilkington	Republic of Ireland	FW	2014–2019	2013–2016	3	1	
Keith Pontin	Wales	DF	1976–1983	1980	2	0	
Gavin Rae	Scotland	MF	2007–2011	2007–2009	2	0	
Aaron Ramsey	Wales	MF	2023–2025	2023–2025	4	1	
Kevin Ratcliffe	Wales	DF	1992–1993	1992–1993	1	0	
Gil Reece	Wales	MF	1973–1976	1973–1975	13	1	
Billy Rees	Wales	FW	1944–1949	1949	3	0	
George Reid	Ireland	FW	1922–1923	1923	1	0	
Jazz Richards	Wales	DF	2016–2020	2016–2018	6	0	
Stan Richards	Wales	FW	1946–1948	1946	1	0	
Andy Rinomhota	Zimbabwe	MF	2022–2025	2023–2024	11	0	
Walter Robbins	Wales	FW	1928–1931	1930–1931	5	1	
Alex Robertson ‡	Australia	MF	2024–	2026–	1	0	
Callum Robinson ‡	Republic of Ireland	FW	2022–	2022–	8	2	
Peter Rodrigues	Wales	DF	1961–1965	1965–1965	7	0	
Mahlon Romeo	Antigua and Barbuda	FB	2022–2024	2023–2023	2	0	
Rúnar Alex Rúnarsson	Iceland	GK	2023	2023	3	0	
Romaine Sawyers	Saint Kitts and Nevis	MF	2022–2024	2022–2023	11	1	
Peter Sayer	Wales	MF	1974–1978 & 1981	1977	7	0	
Alf Sherwood	Wales	DF	1942–1956	1946–1956	39	0	
Derek Showers	Wales	FW	1970–1977	1975	2	0	
Manolis Siopis	Greece	MF	2023-2025	2023-2024	10	0	
Tom Sloan	Ireland	DF	1924–1929	1925–1929	8	0	
Bert Smith	Ireland	DF	1919–1923	1921–1923	4	0	
Fred Stansfield	Wales	DF	1943–1949	1948	1	0	
Ron Stitfall	Wales	DF	1947–1963	1952–1957	2	0	
Derrick Sullivan	Wales	DF	1947–1961	1953–1961	17	0	
Derek Tapscott	Wales	FW	1958–1965	1958–1959	2	2	
Rod Thomas	Wales	DF	1977–1981	1977	1	0	
John Toshack	Wales	FW	1965–1970	1969–1970	8	2	
Nigel Vaughan	Wales	MF	1983–1987	1983–1984	7	0	
Will Vaulks	Wales	MF	2019–2022	2019–2022	2	0	
Graham Vearncombe	Wales	GK	1952–1964	1957–1960	2	0	
Tony Vidmar	Australia	DF	2003–2005	2003–2005	15	1	
Tony Villars	Wales	MF	1971–1976	1974	2	0	
Haris Vučkić	Slovenia	MF	2012	2012	1	0	
Dai Ward	Wales	FW	1961–1962	1961	1	0	
Fred Warren	Wales	FW	1927–1930	1929	1	1	
Tom Watson	Ireland	DF	1925–1929	1926	1	0	
Rhys Weston	Wales	DF	2000–2006	2000–2005	6	0	
Gavin Whyte	Northern Ireland	MF	2019–2021	2019–2021	16	3	
Glyn Williams	Wales	DF	1946–1952	1951	1	0	
Harry Wilson	Wales	MF	2020–2021	2020–2021	12	2	
