= Ernie Morley =

Welsh footballer

Personal information
- Date of birth: 11 September 1901
- Place of birth: Wales
- Position: Defender

Senior career*
Years	Team	Apps	(Gls)
1924–1925	Swansea Town		

International career
1925–1929	Wales	4	(0)
- * Club domestic league appearances and goals

Ernie Morley (11 September 1901 – ) was a Welsh international football defender. He was part of the Wales national football team between 1925 and 1929, playing 4 matches. He played his first match on 28 February 1925 against England and his last match on 2 February 1929 against Ireland. At club level, he played for Swansea Town between 1924 and 1925.

== See also ==
- List of Wales international footballers (alphabetical)
