= Michael Johnson (footballer, born 1941) =

Welsh footballer

Mike Johnson
Personal information
- Full name: Michael George Johnson
- Date of birth: 13 October 1941
- Place of birth: Swansea, Wales
- Date of death: 1991 (aged 49–50)
- Position: Defender

Senior career*
Years	Team	Apps	(Gls)
1959–1966	Swansea Town	165	(0)

International career
	Wales U23	2	(0)
1964	Wales	1	(0)
- * Club domestic league appearances and goals

Michael George "Mike" Johnson (13 October 1941 – 1991) was a Welsh international central defender who played for Swansea Town in the 1960s.

Johnson spent several years as understudy to Mel Nurse before replacing the Welsh international following his move to Middlesbrough. He made one appearance for Wales during his career, in a 3–2 defeat to Northern Ireland in April 1964.
