= Jack Lewis (footballer, born 1902) =

Welsh footballer

Personal information
- Full name: James John Lewis
- Date of birth: 16 January 1902
- Place of birth: Newport, Wales
- Height: 5 ft 7 in (1.70 m)
- Position: Left-half

Senior career*
Years	Team	Apps	(Gls)
- Somerton Park Juniors
1922–1923	Newport County	26	(0)
1924–1925	Cardiff City	1	(0)
1925–1933	Tranmere Rovers	266	(9)

International career
1925	Wales	1	(0)
- * Club domestic league appearances and goals

James John Lewis (born 16 January 1902, date of death unknown) was a Welsh footballer who played in the English Football League for Cardiff City, Newport County and Tranmere Rovers. He was born in Newport.

== Career ==
Lewis started his career at his home town club Newport County, joined Cardiff City in 1924. Having made just one appearance for the club, during a 4–1 defeat against Bury, Lewis was called into the Wales squad for the British Home Championship match against Scotland on 31 October 1925, which ended in a 3–0 defeat. Lewis never played for Wales or Cardiff City again, moving to Tranmere Rovers where he went on to make over 250 appearances.
