= Mike Smith (football manager) =

English football manager (1937–2021)

Personal information
- Full name: Michael John Smith
- Date of birth: 1937
- Place of birth: Hendon, England
- Date of death: 21 July 2021 (aged 83)

Senior career*
Years	Team	Apps	(Gls)
- Corinthian Casuals

Managerial career
- 1974–1979: Wales
- 1979–1982: Hull City
- 1985–1988: Egypt
- 1994–1995: Wales
Medal record
Men's football
Representing Egypt (as manager)
Africa Cup of Nations
Winner	1986
- * Club domestic league appearances and goals

Michael John Smith (1937 – 21 July 2021) was an English football manager, who managed the Wales and Egypt national teams and Hull City. Before becoming a manager, he had a playing career as an amateur, playing for the Corinthian Casuals.

== Early career ==
Smith was born in Hendon, the son of a professional footballer. As a youth, he represented Middlesex at Under-15 and Under-18 levels and was a member of the FA Youth team which played a tournament in Strasbourg in 1953.

He trained at Loughborough College of Education before becoming a teacher. He decided to remain in teaching rather than becoming a professional footballer but played as an amateur for the Corinthian Casuals.

== Coaching and managerial career ==
Smith spent nine years coaching in Sussex before becoming team manager and coach to the Conference of English Grammar Schools. He was then appointed the Football Association of Wales Director of Coaching with responsibility for managing the Welsh amateur and youth international teams.

In 1974, Smith succeeded Dave Bowen to become the first English-born manager and first full-time manager of the Wales national football team. He guided Wales through their qualifying group before losing a play-off against Yugoslavia to reach the Finals proper of the 1976 European Football Championship. He was replaced by Mike England in 1979.

In December 1979, he was appointed manager of Hull City but was sacked, along with coach Cyril Lea, in March 1982.

Following a spell in sports promotion in Nottingham, Smith became the manager of Egypt in 1985. He led the team to victory in the 1986 African Cup of Nations; the only British manager to have won the competition as a coach.

He left the Egyptian side in 1988, following which he was appointed Football development consultant to Anglesey County Council, overseeing their school of excellence in Holyhead. He also took charge of the Wales Youth team in 1989–90 before returning to the Wales national team role for 18 months from April 1994 to September 1995.

== Later life and death ==
His death was announced on 22 July 2021. He was 83.

== Honours ==
Egypt

- African Cup of Nations: 1986
