= 2015 Gold Coast Titans season =

- NRL Rank: 14th
- 2015 record: Wins: 9; draws: 0; losses: 15
- Points scored: For: 439; against: 636

Team information
- CEO: Graham Annesley
- Coach: Neil Henry
- Captain: Nate Myles
- Stadium: Cbus Super Stadium - 27,400
- Avg. attendance: 11,251
- High attendance: 15,583 (vs. South Sydney Rabbitohs, Rd 12)

Top scorers
- Tries: James Roberts (16)
- Goals: Aidan Sezer (51)
- Points: Aidan Sezer (115)
← 2014	List of seasons	2016 →

The 2015 Gold Coast Titans season was the 9th in the club's history. Coached by Neil Henry and captained by Nate Myles, they competed in the NRL's 2015 Telstra Premiership. Gold Coast finished the regular season in 14th (out of 16) and failed to qualify for the finals for the fifth consecutive year.

== Season summary ==
On 12 December 2014, Greg Bird was axed as co-captain and fined $15,000 by the club after he was issued with a criminal infringement notice for urinating in public. Paul Carter had his contract terminated by the club after his second drink-driving offence in a year.

In late February 2015, five players were stood down by the Titans after being charged and issued with notices to appear in court in relation to drug offences by Queensland's Crime and Corruption Commission. The players were Greg Bird (two counts of supplying a dangerous drug), Jamie Dowling (seven counts of possession and two counts of supplying a dangerous drug), Kalifa Faifai Loa (one count of supplying a dangerous drug), Beau Falloon (four counts of supplying a dangerous drug) and Dave Taylor (One count of possession and one count of supplying a dangerous drug). Ex-Titans Ashley Harrison (two counts of supplying a dangerous drug), Steve Michaels (10 counts of supplying a dangerous drug) and Joe Vickery (seven counts of supplying a dangerous drug) were also charged and issued with notices to appear in court.

The charges against Bird, Falloon, Harrison and Fai Fai Loa were later dismissed due to insufficient evidence however Dowling, Taylor and Vickery were committed to stand trial against the charges.

On 23 February 2015, the football club was placed in voluntary administration and their licence terminated by the NRL after the Board conceded the club could no longer meet its financial obligations, including staff and player salaries. The NRL assumed full ownership of the Gold Coast Titans however Chairwoman Rebecca Frizelle, Directors Darryl Kelly and Paul Donovan remain on the board, with CEO Graham Annesley also remaining in his role.

In November 2015, the club announced the addition of four new independent Board members; Tony Hickey (Founder and Managing Partner, Hickey Lawyers); Trish Hogan (CEO, Pindara Private Hospital); Professor Ned Pankhurst (Senior Deputy Vice Chancellor, Griffith University); and Lynne Anderson (CEO, Australian Paralympic Committee).

On 6 March 2015, it was announced Daly Cherry-Evans had signed a four-year, $4 million deal to play with the Titans starting in 2016. Cherry-Evans later reneged on the deal to remain with the Manly-Warringah Sea Eagles on a $10 million contract extension.

=== Milestones ===
- Round 1: Lachlan Burr, Josh Hoffman, Kierran Moseley, Agnatius Paasi, Eddy Pettybourne and Matt Robinson made their debuts for the club
- Round 2: Ryan Simpkins made his debut for the club
- Round 3: Ryan James played his 50th career game
- Round 4: Kane Elgey made his first grade debut
- Round 4: Agnatius Paasi scored his first career try
- Round 4: William Zillman played his 150th career game and Beau Falloon played his 50th game for the club
- Round 6: William Zillman scored his 50th career try
- Round 7: Greg Bird played his 100th game for the club
- Round 8: Kane Elgey and Kierran Moseley scored their first career tries
- Round 15: Nene Macdonald and Chad Redman made their debuts for the club
- Round 15: Lachlan Burr scored his 1st career try
- Round 16: Nate Myles played his 200th career game and Dave Taylor played his 50th game for the club
- Round 18: Nathaniel Peteru made his first grade debut and scored his 1st career try
- Round 22: David Hala made his debut for the club
- Round 23: Leva Li made his first grade debut for the club
- Round 23: Matt White played his 150th career game and Kalifa Faifai Loa his 50th career game
- Round 24: James Roberts played his 50th career game

== Squad List ==
Gold Coast Titans
First team squad			Coaching staff
Caleb Binge – PR; Greg Bird – SR; Lachlan Burr – SR, LK; Davin Crampton – CE, WG, LK; Anthony Don – FB, WG; Luke Douglas – PR; Jamie Dowling – FB, WG; Kane Elgey – FE, HB; Kalifa Faifai Loa – WG, CE, FB; Beau Falloon – HK; Jamal Fogarty – FE, HB, FB; Kevin Gordon – FB, WG, CE; David Hala – PR	Christian Hazard – FE, HB; Josh Hoffman – FB, FE; Shaun Hudson – CE, FB, WG; Jai Ingram; Ryan James – PR, SR; Leva Li – WG; Nene Macdonald – WG, CE, FB; David Mead – WG, FB, CE; Daniel Mortimer – HB, FE, HK; Kierran Moseley – HK; Nate Myles (c) – SR, PR; Agnatius Paasi – PR; Nathaniel Peteru – PR	Eddy Pettybourne – PR, SR; Chad Redman – HK; Ben Ridge – SR; James Roberts – CE, WG; Aidan Sezer – FE; Ryan Simpkins – LK, SR; Matt Robinson – SR; Matt Srama – HK; Dave Taylor – SR; Brad Tighe – CE; Matt White – PR; William Zillman – FB, CE	Head coach: Neil Henry; Assistant coach: Terry Matterson; Legend: (c) Captain(s); (vc) Vice-captain(s); Updated: 29 March 2015; Source(s): Titans Squad

== Squad Movement ==
=== Gains ===
Player	Signed from	Until end of	Notes
Lachlan Burr	Canterbury-Bankstown Bulldogs	2016	
Davin Crampton	Northern Pride	2015	
David Hala	Brisbane Broncos	2016	
Josh Hoffman	Brisbane Broncos	2017	
Nene Macdonald	Sydney Roosters (Mid Season)	2016	
Kierran Moseley	Penrith Panthers	2016	
Nathaniel Peteru	New Zealand Warriors (Mid Season)	2016	
Eddy Pettybourne	Wigan Warriors	2015	
Chad Redman	Newcastle Knights (Mid Season)	2015	
Matt Robinson	Penrith Panthers	2016	
Ryan Simpkins	Penrith Panthers	2016	

=== Losses ===
Player	Signed To	Until end of	Notes
Luke Bailey	Retirement	-	
Maurice Blair	Hull Kingston Rovers	2016	
Ashley Harrison	Retirement	-	
Beau Henry	St. George Illawarra Dragons	2015	
Mark Ioane	St. George Illawarra Dragons (Mid Season)	2015	
Sam Irwin	Featherstone Rovers	2016	
Albert Kelly	Hull Kingston Rovers	2016	
Tom Kingston	Released	-	
Steve Michaels	Hull F.C.	2015	
Mark Minichiello	Hull F.C.	2016	
Cody Nelson	Parramatta Eels	2016	
Brad Takairangi	Parramatta Eels	2015	

=== Re-Signings ===
Player	Club	Until end of	Notes
Jed Cartwright	Gold Coast Titans	2017	
Kane Elgey	Gold Coast Titans	2017	
Brian Kelly	Gold Coast Titans	2017	
Karl Lawton	Gold Coast Titans	2017	
Agnatius Paasi	Gold Coast Titans	2017	
Eddy Pettybourne	Gold Coast Titans	2017	
Oshae Tuiasau	Gold Coast Titans	2017	

=== Contract lengths ===
Player	2015	2016	2017	2018	2019	Source
Caleb Binge	Gold Coast Titans	Released				
Jamie Dowling	Gold Coast Titans	Released				
Davin Crampton	Gold Coast Titans	Released				
Kalifa Faifai Loa	Gold Coast Titans	St George Illawarra Dragons				
Beau Falloon	Gold Coast Titans	Leeds Rhinos				
Jamal Fogarty	Gold Coast Titans	Released				
Kevin Gordon	Gold Coast Titans	Retirement				
Christian Hazard	Gold Coast Titans	Released				
Shaun Hudson	Gold Coast Titans	North Queensland Cowboys				
Jai Ingram	Gold Coast Titans	Released				
Nate Myles	Gold Coast Titans	Manly-Warringah Sea Eagles				
Chad Redman	Gold Coast Titans	Released				
Ben Ridge	Gold Coast Titans	Retirement				
James Roberts	Gold Coast Titans	Brisbane Broncos				
Aidan Sezer	Gold Coast Titans	Canberra Raiders				
Dave Taylor	Gold Coast Titans	Catalans Dragons				
Brad Tighe	Gold Coast Titans	Retirement				
Matt White	Gold Coast Titans	Melbourne Storm				
Lachlan Burr	Gold Coast Titans					
Anthony Don	Gold Coast Titans					
David Hala	Gold Coast Titans					
Nene Macdonald	Gold Coast Titans					
David Mead	Gold Coast Titans					
Daniel Mortimer	Gold Coast Titans					
Kierran Moseley	Gold Coast Titans					
Nathaniel Peteru	Gold Coast Titans					
Matt Robinson	Gold Coast Titans					
Ryan Simpkins	Gold Coast Titans					
Greg Bird	Gold Coast Titans					
Jed Cartwright	Gold Coast Titans					
Luke Douglas	Gold Coast Titans					
Kane Elgey	Gold Coast Titans					
Josh Hoffman	Gold Coast Titans					
Ryan James	Gold Coast Titans					
Brian Kelly	Gold Coast Titans					
Karl Lawton	Gold Coast Titans					
Agnatius Paasi	Gold Coast Titans					
Eddy Pettybourne	Gold Coast Titans					
Oshae Tuiasau	Gold Coast Titans					
William Zillman	Gold Coast Titans					

== Ladder ==
2015 NRL season
Pos	Team	Pld	W	D	L	B	PF	PA	PD	Pts
1	Sydney Roosters	24	18	0	6	2	591	300	+291	40
2	Brisbane Broncos	24	17	0	7	2	574	379	+195	38
3	North Queensland Cowboys (P)	24	17	0	7	2	587	454	+133	38
4	Melbourne Storm	24	14	0	10	2	467	348	+119	32
5	Canterbury-Bankstown Bulldogs	24	14	0	10	2	522	480	+42	32
6	Cronulla-Sutherland Sharks	24	14	0	10	2	469	476	−7	32
7	South Sydney Rabbitohs	24	13	0	11	2	465	467	−2	30
8	St. George Illawarra Dragons	24	12	0	12	2	435	408	+27	28
9	Manly-Warringah Sea Eagles	24	11	0	13	2	458	492	−34	26
10	Canberra Raiders	24	10	0	14	2	577	569	+8	24
11	Penrith Panthers	24	9	0	15	2	399	477	−78	22
12	Parramatta Eels	24	9	0	15	2	448	573	−125	22
13	New Zealand Warriors	24	9	0	15	2	445	588	−143	22
14	Gold Coast Titans	24	9	0	15	2	439	636	−197	22
15	Wests Tigers	24	8	0	16	2	487	562	−75	20
16	Newcastle Knights	24	8	0	16	2	458	612	−154	20

== Fixtures ==
=== Pre-season ===
Date	Round	Opponent	Venue	Score	Tries	Goals	Attendance
Saturday, 7 February	Trial 1	New Zealand Warriors	Clive Berghoffer Stadium	22 – 12	Li, Tighe, Hudson, Hazard	Elgey (2), Fogarty (1)	6,827
Saturday, 21 February	Trial 2	North Queensland Cowboys	Barlow Park	10 – 30	Srama, Gordon	Sezer (1)	–
Legend: Win Loss Draw

==== NRL Auckland Nines ====
The NRL Auckland Nines is a pre-season rugby league nines competition featuring all 16 NRL clubs. The 2015 competition was played over two days on the 31 January and 1 February at Eden Park. The Titans featured in the Hunua Ranges pool and played the Raiders, Warriors and Tigers. The Titans won only one match and failed to qualify for the quarter finals.

Hunua Ranges Pool
Team	Pld	W	D	L	PF	PA	PD	Pts
Wests Tigers	3	2	0	1	50	32	18	4
New Zealand Warriors	3	2	0	1	58	41	17	4
Gold Coast Titans	3	1	0	2	48	56	-8	2
Canberra Raiders	3	1	0	2	46	73	-27	2

Date	Time (Local)	Round	Opponent	Venue	Score	Tries	Goals
Saturday, 31 January	2:45pm	Round 1	New Zealand Warriors	Eden Park	10 – 17	Hoffman, Sezer	Daniel Mortimer (1)
Saturday, 31 January	6:15pm	Round 2	Wests Tigers	Eden Park	0 – 26		
Sunday, 1 February	1:15m	Round 3	Canberra Raiders	Eden Park	38 – 13	Hoffman (2), Roberts (2), Hazard, Faifai Loa, Elgey	Mortimer (2), Faifai Loa (2)
Legend: Win Loss Draw

=== Regular season ===
Date	Round	Opponent	Venue	Score	Tries	Goals	Attendance
Saturday, 7 March	Round 1	Wests Tigers	Cbus Super Stadium	18 – 19	Roberts (2), James	Sezer (3/4)	14,319
Saturday, 14 March	Round 2	Penrith Panthers	Carrington Park	0 – 40			6,240
Sunday, 22 March	Round 3	Newcastle Knights	Cbus Super Stadium	18 – 20	Sezer (2), Don	Sezer (3/3)	6,962
Saturday, 28 March	Round 4	Cronulla-Sutherland Sharks	Remondis Stadium	24 – 22	Roberts (2), Taylor, Paasi	Sezer (4/4)	9,566
Friday, 3 April	Round 5	Brisbane Broncos	Cbus Super Stadium	16 – 26	Don, Mead, James	Sezer (2/3)	15,432
Saturday, 11 April	Round 6	Parramatta Eels	Pirtek Stadium	38 – 16	Roberts (3), Taylor, Zillman, Mead, Don	Sezer (5/7)	11,136
Saturday, 18 April	Round 7	Penrith Panthers	Cbus Super Stadium	32 – 6	Zillman (2), Hoffman (2), Roberts	Sezer (5/6), Bird (1/1)	9,244
Saturday, 25 April	Round 8	New Zealand Warriors	Mt. Smart Stadium	32 – 28	Elgey (2), Don, Moseley, Roberts, James	Sezer (4/6)	15,102
Saturday, 9 May	Round 9	Canberra Raiders	GIO Stadium	16 – 56	Don (3)	Sezer (2/3)	8,116
Saturday, 16 May	Round 10	Cronulla-Sutherland Sharks	Cbus Super Stadium	22 – 23	James, Mead, Don	Sezer (5/6)	10,466
	Round 11	Bye					
Saturday, 30 May	Round 12	South Sydney Rabbitohs	Cbus Super Stadium	16 – 22	Don (2), Roberts	Sezer (2/3)	15,583
Friday, 5 June	Round 13	Wests Tigers	Leichhardt Oval	27 – 20	Sezer, Elgey, Roberts, Don	Sezer (4/5) & (FG), Mortimer (1/1)	7,103
Sunday, 14 June	Round 14	Canterbury-Bankstown Bulldogs	Cbus Super Stadium	28 – 14	James Roberts, Gordon, Tighe, Hoffman	Sezer (4/5)	10,645
Saturday, 20 June	Round 15	New Zealand Warriors	Cbus Super Stadium	14 – 36	Hoffman, Burr, Roberts	Sezer (1/2)	14,132
Sunday, 28 June	Round 16	Sydney Roosters	Central Coast Stadium	10 – 20	Don, Macdonald	Roberts (1/1)	12,569
	Round 17	Bye					
Monday, 13 July	Round 18	Manly-Warringah Sea Eagles	Cbus Super Stadium	6 – 38	Peteru	Gordon (1/1)	9,632
Saturday, 18 July	Round 19	Newcastle Knights	Hunter Stadium	2 – 30		Mortimer (1)	10,546
Friday, 24 July	Round 20	Brisbane Broncos	Suncorp Stadium	0 – 34			27,665
Monday, 3 August	Round 21	Parramatta Eels	Cbus Super Stadium	24 – 14	Macdonald (2), Elgey, Roberts	Sezer (4/4)	7,496
Sunday, 9 August	Round 22	Melbourne Storm	AAMI Park	14 – 36	Elgey, Hoffman	Sezer (3/3)	10,521
Sunday, 16 August	Round 23	Canterbury-Bankstown Bulldogs	Central Coast Stadium	14 – 36	Faifai Loa (2), Roberts	Bird (1/2)	11,021
Sunday, 23 August	Round 24	Canberra Raiders	Cbus Super Stadium	28 – 12	Faifai Loa (2), Elgey, James, Macdonald	Elgey (4/5)	8,762
Sunday, 30 August	Round 25	St. George Illawarra Dragons	Cbus Super Stadium	28 – 26	Taylor (2), Mead (2), Paasi	Elgey (4/5)	12,335
Saturday, 5 September	Round 26	North Queensland Cowboys	1300SMILES Stadium	12 – 42	Faifai Loa, Hoffman	Elgey (2/2)	16,977
Legend: Win Loss Draw Bye

== Statistics ==
Name	App	T	G	FG	Pts
Greg Bird	12	0	2	0	4
Lachlan Burr	20	1	0	0	4
Anthony Don	16	12	0	0	48
Luke Douglas	24	0	0	0	0
Kane Elgey	16	6	10	0	44
Kalifa Faifai Loa	7	5	0	0	20
Beau Falloon	12	0	0	0	0
Kevin Gordon	6	1	1	0	6
David Hala	2	0	0	0	0
Josh Hoffman	24	6	0	0	24
Mark Ioane	6	0	0	0	0
Ryan James	21	5	0	0	20
Leva Li	1	0	0	0	0
Nene Macdonald	11	4	0	0	16
David Mead	22	5	0	0	20
Daniel Mortimer	17	0	2	0	4
Kierran Moseley	16	1	0	0	4
Nate Myles	16	0	0	0	0
Agnatius Paasi	18	2	0	0	8
Nathaniel Peteru	5	1	0	0	4
Eddy Pettybourne	21	0	0	0	0
Chad Redman	5	0	0	0	0
Ben Ridge	4	0	0	0	0
James Roberts	24	16	1	0	66
Matt Robinson	6	0	0	0	0
Aidan Sezer	18	3	51	1	115
Ryan Simpkins	6	0	0	0	0
Matt Srama	3	0	0	0	0
Dave Taylor	19	4	0	0	16
Brad Tighe	5	1	0	0	4
Matt White	15	0	0	0	0
William Zillman	10	3	0	0	12
Totals		76	67	1	439

== Representatives ==
The following players have played a representative match in 2015.

	All Stars match	City Vs Country	ANZAC Test	Pacific Test	State Of Origin 1	State Of Origin 2	State of Origin 3	Kiwis Tour
Josh Hoffman	Indigenous All Stars	-	-	-	-	-	-	-
Ryan James	Indigenous All Stars	Country	-	-	-	-	-	-
Kierran Moseley	Indigenous All Stars	-	-	-	-	-	-	-
Dave Taylor	NRL All Stars	-	-	-	-	-	-	-
Brad Tighe	Indigenous All Stars	-	-	-	-	-	-	-
David Mead	-	Country	-	-	-	-	-	-
James Roberts	-	City	-	-	-	-	-	-
Greg Bird	-	-	Australia	-	-	-	-	-
Nate Myles	-	-	Australia	-	Queensland	Queensland	Queensland	-

== Honours ==
=== League ===
- Dally M Centre of the Year: James Roberts

=== Club ===
- Paul Broughton Medal: Luke Douglas
- Community Award: Ben Ridge
- 'The Preston': Anthony Don
- Rookie of the year: Kane Elgey
- Members Choice: Luke Bailey
- U/20s Player of the year: Shaun Hudson
