= James Roberts =

James, Jamie, Jim, or Jimmy Roberts may refer to:

== Entertainment and journalism ==
- James Roberts (printer) (1564–1606), English printer of Elizabethan literature
- James Roberts (painter) (1753-ca.1809), English portrait painter
- James C. Roberts (born 1946), founder of Radio America
- Jimmy Roberts (born 1957), sports broadcaster for NBC
- Jimmy Roberts (composer), composer of the musical I Love You, You're Perfect, Now Change
- Jimmy Roberts (musician), saxophonist and member of rock groups Young and Truck,
- Jimmy Roberts (singer) (1924–1999), American singer, featured on the Lawrence Welk Show
- Jim Roberts, singer/songwriter/lyricist in 1960s and 1970s, member of Seatrain

== Sports ==
=== Football and rugby ===
- James Roberts (footballer, born 1878) (1878–?), Bradford City A.F.C. and Wales international footballer
- James Roberts (footballer, born 1891) (1891–?), Wrexham A.F.C. and Wales international footballer
- James Roberts (footballer, born 1996), Oxford United F.C. footballer
- Jamie Roberts (born 1986), rugby union player
- James Roberts (football and futsal) (born 1948), Australian footballer and national futsal coach
- James Roberts (rugby league) (born 1993), Australian rugby league footballer
- Jimmy Roberts (Australian footballer) (1883–1961), Australian rules footballer for Geelong
- Jim Roberts (Australian footballer) (1931–2013), Australian rules footballer for Geelong
- James Soto Roberts (born 1992), Liberian footballer
- Jim Roberts (rugby union) (1932–2020), English rugby union player

=== Other sports ===
- Jim Roberts (baseball) (1895–1984), former MLB player
- James Roberts (cricketer) (1864–1911), English cricketer
- James Roberts (Liberian athlete) (born 1936), Liberian sprinter
- Jim Roberts (ice hockey, born 1940) (1940–2015), NHL player for Montreal and St. Louis
- Jim Roberts (ice hockey, born 1956), retired NHL player for Minnesota
- James Roberts (British athlete) (born 1986), wheelchair basketball player
- James Roberts (swimmer) (born 1991), Australian swimmer

== Government and politics ==
- James C. Roberts (politician) (1822–1872), American politician and businessman from Pennsylvania
- James A. Roberts (1847–1922), American lawyer and politician
- James Roberts (trade unionist) (1878–1967), New Zealand trade unionist and member of Legislative Council
- James L. Roberts Jr. (born 1945), justice of the Supreme Court of Mississippi

== Other people ==
- James Roberts (slave narrative) (1753–?), American slave
- James Reynolds Roberts (1826–1859), English recipient of the Victoria Cross
- Sir James Roberts, 1st Baronet (1848–1935), Yorkshire industrialist and businessman
- J. O. M. Roberts (1916–1997), British mountaineer and explorer
- Jim Roberts (architect) (1922–2019), British architect
- James E. Roberts (1930–2006), American engineer
- Jimmie T. Roberts (1939–2015), founder of The Brethren church group
- J. J. M. Roberts (Jimmy Jack McBee Roberts, born 1939), American theologian
- James Roberts (Medal of Honor) (1837–?), United States Navy seaman and Medal of Honor recipient
