= 1906–07 British Home Championship =

Tournament details
- Host country: England, Ireland, Scotland and Wales
- Dates: 16 February – 6 April 1907
- Teams: 4

Final positions
- Champions: Wales (1st title)
- Runners-up: England

Tournament statistics
- Matches played: 6
- Goals scored: 14 (2.33 per match)
- Top scorer: (Wales) Lot Jones (2 goals)

The 1906–07 British Home Championship was an international football tournament between the British Home Nations. For the first time ever it was won undisputed by the Welsh team, who secured two victories and a draw to take them to the top of the table. They were followed by England and Scotland, who both played well but could not overhaul the Welsh points advantage. All three teams beat Ireland, who finished without a point.

As usual, England and Ireland began the tournament, England winning a close game by a single goal from Harold Hardman. In Belfast during the second match, despite a close contest and five goals, Wales managed to beat the Irish 3–2 and join England at the top of the table. Wales then beat Scotland in a surprise result, winning 1–0 in Wrexham by a goal from veteran Grenville Morris to become tournament favourites. Scotland recovered in their second game with a three-goal rout of Ireland, finishing a miserable tournament for the Irish. Wales and England then played, the Welsh needing a win to take the competition undisputed whilst a draw would leave them waiting for the result of the England versus Scotland game. In the event the match finished 1–1 and England played Scotland in Newcastle needing a win to draw level with Wales. In the event, Scotland proved too good and the game finished with a 2–2 draw, handing the championship to Wales for the first time.

== Table ==
Team	Pld	W	D	L	GF	GA	GD	Pts
Wales (C)	3	2	1	0	5	3	+2	5
England	3	1	2	0	3	2	+1	4
Scotland	3	1	1	1	4	2	+2	3
Ireland	3	0	0	3	2	7	−5	0

Rules for classification: 1) points. The points system worked as follows: 2 points for a win and 1 point for a draw.
(C) Champions

== Results ==
16 February 1907

England	1–0	Ireland
Hardman 53'

Goodison Park, Liverpool
Attendance: 22,235
Referee: Tom Robertson (Scotland)

23 February 1907

Ireland	2–3	Wales
O'Hagan 10'; Sloan 80'	Report	D. Morris 12'; Meredith 78'; W. Jones 83'

Solitude, Belfast
Attendance: 12,000
Referee: Fred Kirkham (England)

4 March 1907

Wales	1–0	Scotland
G. Morris 50'	Report

Racecourse Ground, Wrexham
Attendance: 7,715
Referee: James Mason (England)

16 March 1907

Scotland	3–0	Ireland
O'Rourke 40'; Walker 48'; Thomson 82' (pen.)	Scottish FA

Celtic Park, Glasgow
Attendance: 26,000
Referee: John Lewis (England)

18 March 1907

England	1–1	Wales
Stewart 62'		W. Jones 25'

Craven Cottage, London
Attendance: 22,000
Referee: Robert Murray (Scotland)

6 April 1907

England	1–1	Scotland
Bloomer 42'		Crompton 2' (o.g.)

St James' Park, Newcastle
Attendance: 35,829
Referee: Thomas Robertson (Scotland)

== Winning squad ==
- Wales

Name	Apps/Goals by opponent			Total	
Name	(Scotland) SCO	(Ireland) IRE	(England) ENG	Apps	Goals
Lot Jones	1	1/1	1/1	3	2
Billy Meredith	1	1/1	1	3	1
Lloyd Davies	1	1	1	3	0
George Latham	1	1	1	3	0
Leigh Roose	1	1	1	3	0
Grenville Morris	1/1		1	2	1
Gordon Jones	1	1		2	0
Dicky Morris		1/1		1	1
Robert Evans			1	1	0
Arthur Green			1	1	0
Ted Hughes			1	1	0
Sam Meredith			1	1	0
Morgan Morgan-Owen			1	1	0
Llewelyn Davies		1		1	0
Arthur Hughes		1		1	0
James Roberts		1		1	0
George Williams		1		1	0
Horace Blew	1			1	0
Hugh Morgan-Owen	1			1	0
Charlie Morris	1			1	0
Haydn Price	1			1	0
