= 1905–06 British Home Championship =

Tournament details
- Host country: England, Ireland, Scotland and Wales
- Dates: 17 February – 7 April 1906
- Teams: 4

Final positions
- Champions: England; Scotland (shared)

Tournament statistics
- Matches played: 6
- Goals scored: 20 (3.33 per match)
- Top scorer(s): (Wales) William Green (Ireland) Harold Sloan (3 goals)

The 1905–06 British Home Championship was the 22nd edition of the annual international football tournament played between the British Home Nations. The trophy was shared between the two sides which regularly dominated the competition, England and Scotland who each gained four points.

England and Ireland began the tournament in February 1906, with England scoring five goals without reply and rising up the rankings. Wales joined them after their match with Scotland which they won in Edinburgh by 2–0. Scotland recovered to beat Ireland by a single goal, and England then moved ahead by beating Wales with an identical scoreline in Cardiff. Playing for lower rankings, Wales and Ireland fought out a 4–4 draw in Wrexham before the deciding game between England and Scotland at Hampden Park; England needed only a draw to take the title outright, but Scotland played well and in a flowing match won 2–1 to share the honours.

Parts of the Wales vs Ireland match at Wrexham were filmed by the Blackburn company of Mitchell and Kenyon, and this is now the oldest surviving footage of an international football match.

== Table ==
Team	Pld	W	D	L	GF	GA	GD	Pts
England (C)	3	2	0	1	7	2	+5	4
Scotland (C)	3	2	0	1	3	3	0	4
Wales	3	1	1	1	6	5	+1	3
Ireland	3	0	1	2	4	10	−6	1

Rules for classification: 1) points. The points system worked as follows: 2 points for a win and 1 point for a draw.
(C) Co-champions

== Results ==
17 February 1906

Ireland	0–5	England
		Bond 26', 89'; Brown 32'; Harris 56'; Day 70'

Solitude, Belfast
Attendance: 14,063
Referee: Tom Robertson (Scotland)

3 March 1906

Scotland	0–2	Wales
		Jones 50'; L. Jones 65'

Tynecastle Park, Edinburgh
Attendance: 25,000
Referee: John Lewis (England)

17 March 1906

Ireland	0–1	Scotland
		Fitchie 52'

Dalymount Park, Dublin
Attendance: 8,000
Referee: Frederick Bye (England)

19 March 1906

Wales	0–1	England
		Day 86'

Cardiff Arms Park, Cardiff
Attendance: 15,000
Referee: Robert Murray (Scotland)

2 April 1906

Wales	4–4	Ireland
Green 13', 20', 28'; Morgan-Owen 55'		Sloan 10', 25', 74'; Maxwell 72'

Racecourse Ground, Wrexham
Attendance: 5,000
Referee: Fred Kirkham (England)

7 April 1906

Scotland	2–1	England
Howie 40', 55'		Shepherd 81'

Hampden Park, Glasgow
Attendance: 102,741
Referee: William Nunnerley (Wales)

== Winning squads ==
- England

Name	Apps/Goals by opponent			Total	
Name	(Wales) WAL	(Ireland) IRE	(Scotland) SCO	Apps	Goals
Dickie Bond	1	1/2	1	3	2
Sammy Day	1/1	1/1	1	3	2
Stan Harris	1	1/1	1	3	1
James Ashcroft	1	1	1	3	0
Bob Crompton	1	1	1	3	0
Colin Veitch	1	1	1	3	0
Ben Warren	1	1	1	3	0
Kelly Houlker	1	1		2	0
Herbert Smith	1	1		2	0
Albert Shepherd			1/1	1	1
Arthur Brown		1/1		1	1
Herbert Burgess			1	1	0
James Conlin			1	1	0
Harry Makepeace			1	1	0
Alf Common	1			1	0
Gordon Wright	1			1	0
Albert Gosnell		1		1	0

- Scotland

Name	Apps/Goals by opponent			Total	
Name	(Wales) WAL	(Ireland) IRE	(England) ENG	Apps	Goals
Donald McLeod	1	1	1	3	0
Thomas Fitchie	1	1/1		2	1
John May	1	1		2	0
Jimmy Quinn	1	1		2	0
Alex Smith		1	1	2	0
George Stewart	1		1	2	0
Charlie Thomson	1	1		2	0
James Howie			1/2	1	2
Andy Aitken			1	1	0
Billy Dunlop			1	1	0
George Livingstone			1	1	0
Peter McBride			1	1	0
Peter McWilliam			1	1	0
Alex Menzies			1	1	0
Alex Raisbeck			1	1	0
Sandy MacFarlane	1			1	0
Alec McNair	1			1	0
Jimmy Raeside	1			1	0
Andrew Richmond	1			1	0
George Wilson	1			1	0
Gladstone Hamilton		1		1	0
David Hill		1		1	0
Harry Rennie		1		1	0
Bobby Walker		1		1	0
James Young		1		1	0
