= Lachlan Burr =

Australian professional rugby league footballer

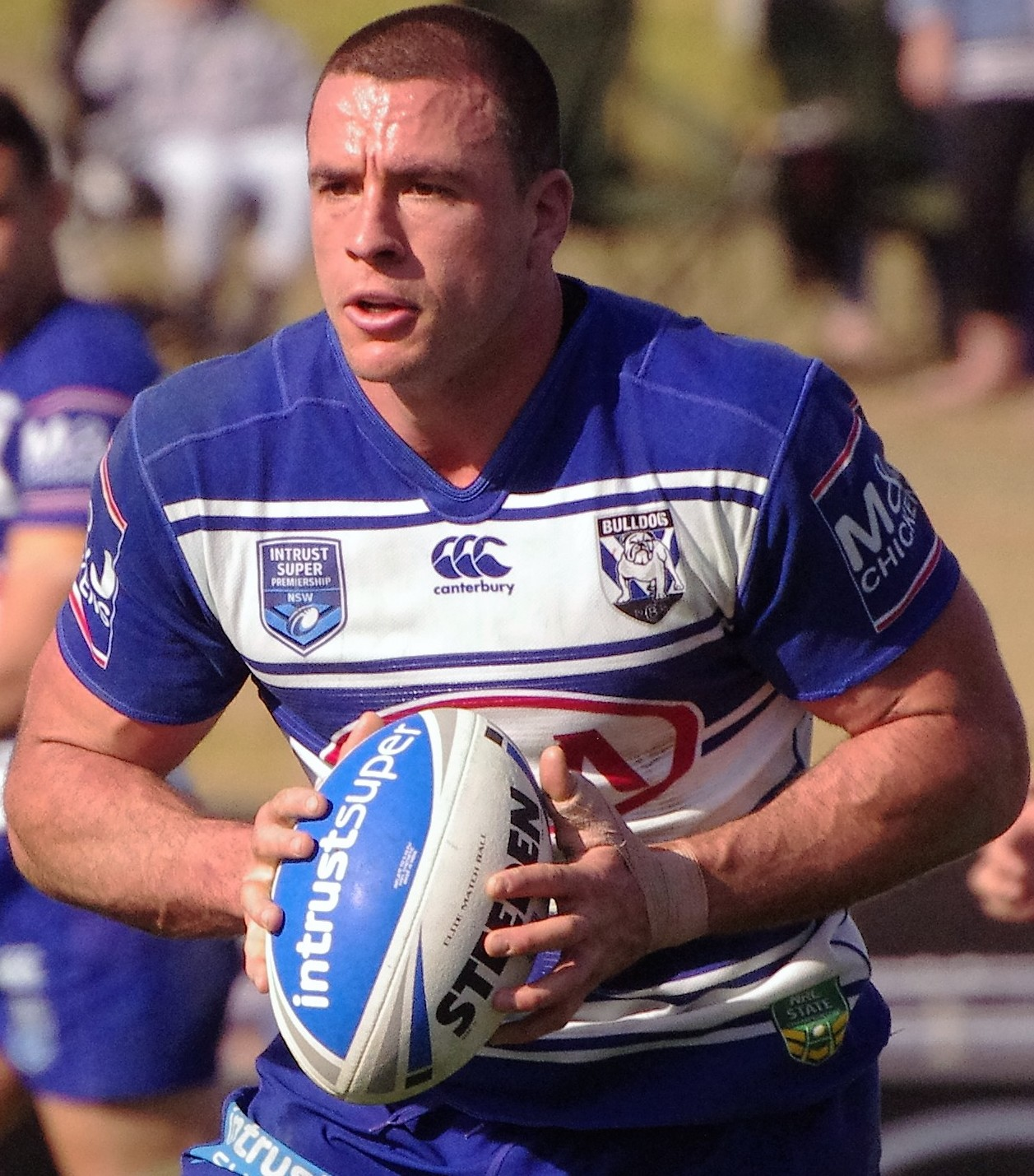

Personal information
- Born: 27 September 1992 (age 33) Sydney, New South Wales, Australia
- Height: 188 cm (6 ft 2 in)
- Weight: 103 kg (16 st 3 lb)

Playing information
- Position: Lock, Prop
Club
Years	Team	Pld	T	G	FG	P
2013	Canterbury Bulldogs	1	0	0	0	0
2015–16	Gold Coast Titans	23	1	0	0	4
2017	Leigh Centurions	28	3	0	0	12
2017(loan)	→ Sheffield Eagles	3	1	0	0	4
2019–20	New Zealand Warriors	37	1	0	0	4
2021	North Qld Cowboys	15	1	0	0	4
	Total	107	7	0	0	28
- Source: As of 24 February 2022

Lachlan Burr (born 27 September 1992) is an Australian former professional rugby league footballer who last played as a lock and prop for the North Queensland Cowboys in the NRL.

He previously played for the Canterbury-Bankstown Bulldogs, Gold Coast Titans and the New Zealand Warriors in the National Rugby League. In England, he played for the Leigh Centurions in the Super League, and on loan from Leigh at the Sheffield Eagles in the RFL Championship.

== Background ==
Burr was born in Sydney, New South Wales, and played his junior rugby league for the Revesby Heights Rhinos before being signed by the Canterbury-Bankstown Bulldogs. He attended Picnic Point High School, where he represented the Australian Schoolboys in 2010.

== Playing career ==
=== Canterbury-Bankstown Bulldogs ===
In 2008, while playing for the Canterbury-Bankstown Harold Matthews Cup team, Burr represented the New South Wales under-16 team. In 2009, he made his debut for the Bulldogs' under-20 side at 16 years old and represented the New South Wales under-18 team. In 2010, he represented New South Wales under-18 again, scoring a try in their 22–18 win over Queensland. Burr played for the Bulldogs' under-20 side until 2012, playing 73 games for the team.

In 2013, Burr moved up to the Canterbury-Bankstown New South Wales Cup team, winning the club's NSW Cup Player of the Year award. In Round 25 of the 2013 NRL season, Burr made his debut for Canterbury-Bankstown in a 34–14 win over the Penrith Panthers.

In 2014, Burr did not appear in first grade for the Canterbury club. On 21 September 2014, Burr was named on the bench in the 2014 New South Wales Cup Team of the Year.

=== Gold Coast Titans ===
On 4 September 2014, Burr signed a two-year contract with the Gold Coast Titans starting in 2015. In Round 1 of the 2015 NRL season, Burr made his debut for the Gold Coast, coming off the bench in a 18–19 loss to the Wests Tigers. In Round 15 of the 2015 NRL season, he scored his first NRL try in a 14–36 loss to the New Zealand Warriors. In his first season at the club, Burr played 20 games, starting eight games at lock.

In 2016, Burr played just three games for the Gold Coast, spending the majority of the season playing for the Burleigh Bears, the Titans' feeder club, in the Queensland Cup. On 25 September 2016, Burr started at lock in Burleigh's 26–16 Grand Final win over the Redcliffe Dolphins at Suncorp Stadium.

=== Leigh Centurions ===
On 27 October 2016, Burr signed with the Bradford Bulls. In January 2017, following Bradford's liquidation, he signed a one-year deal with the Leigh Centurions.

At the start of the 2017 season, Burr played three games on loan for the Sheffield Eagles, Leigh's dual registration club, in the RFL Championship. In his lone season with Leigh, Burr played 28 games, scoring three tries.

=== Canterbury-Bankstown Bulldogs (second stint) ===
In 2018, Burr returned to Australia, re-signing with the Canterbury-Bankstown club and played for their New South Wales Cup team. On 7 September 2018, he was named the Canterbury-Bankstown NSW Cup Player of the Year. On 23 September 2018, he came off the bench in Canterbury's NSW Cup Grand Final win over Newtown. The following week, he played for Canterbury in their NRL State Championship win over Redcliffe at ANZ Stadium.

=== New Zealand Warriors ===
On 19 November 2018, Burr signed with the New Zealand Warriors on a two-year contract. In Round 1 of the 2019 NRL season, he made his debut for the Warriors, starting at lock in a 40–6 win over Canterbury. He played 23 games in his first season with the club, starting 13 at lock.

In Round 5 of the 2020 NRL season, Burr played his 50th NRL game in a 37–26 win over the North Queensland Cowboys at Central Coast Stadium. He played 14 games for the Warriors in 2020, starting 10 at prop.

=== North Queensland Cowboys ===
On 21 October 2020, Burr signed with the North Queensland Cowboys on a two-year deal, joining his former Warriors head coach Todd Payten at the club.

On 24 February 2022, Burr retired from rugby league due to a chronic hip injury.

== Achievements and accolades ==
=== Individual ===
- Canterbury-Bankstown Bulldogs NSW Cup Player of the Year: 2013, 2018
- New South Wales Cup Team of the Year: 2014

== Statistics ==
=== NRL / Super league ===
Statistics are correct to the end of the 2021 season

Season	Team	Matches	T	G	GK %	F/G	Pts
2013	Canterbury-Bankstown	1	0	0	—	0	0
2015	Gold Coast Titans	20	1	0	—	0	4
2016	Gold Coast Titans	3	0	0	—	0	0
2017	Leigh Leopards	28	3				12
2017	Sheffield	3	1				4
2019	Warriors	23	1	0	—	0	4
2020	Warriors	14	0	0	—	0	0
2021	North Queensland Cowboys	15	1				4
Career totals		107	7	0	—	0	28
