= 2020 NRL season =

113th season of professional rugby league in Australia

2020 National Rugby League
- Duration: 12 – 23 March 2020 (Suspended 24 March – 27 May 2020); 28 May – 25 October 2020
- Teams: 16
- Premiers: Melbourne Storm (4th title)
- Minor premiers: Penrith Panthers (3rd title)
- Matches played: 169
- Points scored: 7,092
- Average attendance: 5,245 (Note: Not all attendances were tallied up for the 2020 season, as such the figure is the total from known and provided crowd numbers.)
- Total attendance: 671,412 (Note: Not all attendances were tallied up for the 2020 season, as such the figure is the total from known and provided crowd numbers.)
- Top points scorer: Adam Reynolds (221)
- Wooden spoon: Brisbane Broncos (1st spoon)
- Dally M Medal: Jack Wighton
- Top try-scorer: Alex Johnston (23)

The 2020 NRL season was the 113th season of professional rugby league in Australia and the 23rd season run by the National Rugby League.

== Teams ==
The lineup of teams remained unchanged for the 14th consecutive year.

Colours	Club	Season	Home ground(s)	Head coach	Captain(s)
	Brisbane Broncos	33rd season	Suncorp Stadium	~~Anthony Seibold~~ → Peter Gentle (interim)	Alex Glenn
	Canberra Raiders	39th season	GIO Stadium Canberra, Campbelltown Stadium^{1}	Ricky Stuart	Jarrod Croker & Josh Hodgson
	Canterbury-Bankstown Bulldogs	86th season	ANZ Stadium & Bankwest Stadium	~~Dean Pay~~ → Steve Georgallis (interim)	Josh Jackson
	Cronulla-Sutherland Sharks	54th season	Netstrata Jubilee Stadium, Bankwest Stadium^{1}	John Morris	Wade Graham
	Gold Coast Titans	14th season	Cbus Super Stadium, Suncorp Stadium^{1}	Justin Holbrook	Kevin Proctor
	Manly Warringah Sea Eagles	71st season	Lottoland, Central Coast Stadium^{1}	Des Hasler	Daly Cherry-Evans
	Melbourne Storm	23rd season	AAMI Park, Sunshine Coast Stadium^{2}	Craig Bellamy	Cameron Smith
	Newcastle Knights	33rd season	McDonald Jones Stadium, Central Coast Stadium^{1}	Adam O'Brien	Mitchell Pearce
	New Zealand Warriors	26th season	Central Coast Stadium^{3}	~~Stephen Kearney~~ → Todd Payten (interim)	Roger Tuivasa-Sheck
	North Queensland Cowboys	26th season	Queensland Country Bank Stadium	~~Paul Green~~ → Josh Hannay (interim)	Michael Morgan
	Parramatta Eels	74th season	Bankwest Stadium	Brad Arthur	Clint Gutherson
	Penrith Panthers	54th season	Panthers Stadium, Campbelltown Stadium^{1}	Ivan Cleary	James Tamou
	South Sydney Rabbitohs	111th season	ANZ Stadium & Bankwest Stadium	Wayne Bennett	Adam Reynolds
	St. George Illawarra Dragons	22nd season	Netstrata Jubilee Stadium, WIN Stadium, Campbelltown Stadium^{1}	~~Paul McGregor~~ → Dean Young (interim)	Cameron McInnes
	Sydney Roosters	113th season	Sydney Cricket Ground, Bankwest Stadium^{1}	Trent Robinson	Jake Friend & Boyd Cordner
	Wests Tigers	21st season	Leichhardt Oval, Campbelltown Stadium, Bankwest Stadium	Michael Maguire	Moses Mbye & Benji Marshall

Notes
^{1} Used as a home ground between Rounds 3–7 due to the impacts of the COVID-19 pandemic.
^{2} Used as a home ground between Rounds 10–19 due to the spike in COVID-19 cases in Victoria.
^{3} Used as a home ground for the 2020 season due to travel restrictions between Australia and New Zealand.

== Pre-season ==
The pre-season featured a returning Nines competition held at HBF Park in Perth on 14 & 15 February, replacing the competition previously held in Auckland. The All Stars match was played on 22 February at Cbus Super Stadium, returning to the contest's original venue. The 2020 World Club Challenge saw the NRL premiers Sydney Roosters defeat the Super League champions St. Helens, making them the first club to win consecutive World Club Challenges.

== Regular season ==
The NRL had announced that the Grand Final would be hosted at the Sydney Cricket Ground while the main venue for the decider, ANZ Stadium, underwent an $810m redevelopment. This would have been the first Grand Final to be played at the SCG since 1987. The redevelopment was however scrapped due to the COVID-19 pandemic, meaning that the Grand Final would be again played at ANZ Stadium.

State of Origin was played in Adelaide for the first time, with Game 1 of the 2020 series played at Adelaide Oval.

=== Impact of the COVID-19 pandemic ===
The 2020 season was disrupted by the COVID-19 pandemic, which was formally declared a pandemic by the World Health Organization on 11 March 2020, one day prior to the scheduled start of the premiership season. Restrictions imposed by the different state governments related to social distancing, lockdowns of non-essential services which lasted for three months across the country, and border controls for interstate and international travel, all had significant effects on the completion of the 2020 season.

==== Fixture ====
Prior to the recommencement of the season, the NRL announced the fixture would be shortened from 24 matches per team to 20 (including the two rounds already played prior to the season suspension), which each team playing each other once, and an additional five teams for a second time. The season had commenced on 12 March as originally scheduled; but as restrictions, followed for periods of formal quarantine, were introduced on interstate travel, the season was suspended after round two.

The round two match between the Sydney Roosters and Manly-Warringah Sea Eagles, which was originally meant to be played at Central Coast Stadium, was shifted to Leichhardt Oval.

The new draw was released on 21 May, with just six venues used between Rounds 3 to 7. The Warriors moved to Gosford to play at Central Coast Stadium, the Titans played home games at Suncorp Stadium with the Broncos, and the NSW teams and Canberra were divided between Bankwest Stadium, Campbelltown Stadium, and Central Coast Stadium in a way that no stadium hosts more than one match in a day. The Cowboys and Storm continued to host games at their normal home grounds, Queensland Country Bank Stadium and AAMI Park respectively. From round eight, all teams bar the Storm and Warriors were permitted to return to their home grounds; in the Storm's case, a second wave of COVID-19 cases in Victoria forced the team to evacuate the state and set up camp on the Sunshine Coast, the home of their netball sister side the Sunshine Coast Lightning, for an indefinite period.

==== Opening round ====
The first round of play continued almost unimpeded, although crowd numbers were impacted by fears surrounding the virus.

International restrictions on travel made in New Zealand, whereby all arrivals would be required to self-isolate for two weeks, resulted in the New Zealand Warriors temporarily setting up base in Kingscliff, New South Wales, having already come to Australia to play their Round 1 match. Their Round 2 game against Canberra was played at Cbus Super Stadium on the Gold Coast, instead of at the Warriors' home ground in Auckland.

==== Crowds ====
Government restrictions on gatherings meant that, starting in Round 2, crowds were locked out of senior NRL matches for the first time in the code's history. State governments gradually allowed crowds, often small and restricted in size, into games, starting immediately from Round 5 in New South Wales, and from Round 6 in Queensland.

==== Season suspension ====
During Round 2, speculation that the season would be suspended, if not cancelled, grew. Circumstances surrounding the virus were evolving at a rapid rate, and the future beyond Round 2 was unknown. Many ideas to ensure the season could continue, including moving all players and matches to a single location in Central Queensland where they could continue to play in self-isolation.

On 23 March, the NRL suspended the season indefinitely for the first time in the competition's history, in response to tightening government restrictions to slow the spread of COVID-19. In the following weeks, matches that were scheduled to be played at regional venues were cancelled, as was the Magic Round.

==== Season resumption ====
On 9 April, the NRL announced its intentions to restart the competition on 28 May, with most details still to be determined. The decision was one of three recommendations to come out of Project Apollo, which was created by the NRL's innovations committee to analyse potential solutions to restart the season. The other recommendations included ensuring that a full State of Origin series be played, and keeping with a one-match grand final. However, the NRL required Federal and State governments, as well as broadcasters Fox and Nine, on board with the plan. The structure of the restarted season would also largely depend on what government restrictions were in place by the end of May.

By 22 April, the NRL had obtained government approval to restart the season on 28 May. On 28 April 2020, the NRL announced that the competition would be a 20-round competition, which would allow each team to play each other once with 5 extra fixtures. Points earned in the first two rounds were still counted. State of Origin was played in November after the season's conclusion, while the Grand Final was played on 25 October at ANZ Stadium.

During late April and early May, general government restrictions began to ease in Australia due to successful efforts to slow the spread of COVID-19. The Queensland State Government allowed the three Queensland-based sides to train and play at home; this meant they did not have to base themselves in New South Wales. The Melbourne Storm were forced to move to Albury in NSW to begin their training, with Victoria's government waiting longer to begin easing restrictions, but were able to return to AAMI Park the following week. On 2 May, the New Zealand Warriors were permitted by both Federal governments to enter Australia the following day. They entered two weeks of self-isolation in the regional city of Tamworth, where they were permitted to train to avoid any unfair disadvantage. International travel restrictions meant the side had to remain in Australia for an indefinite period of time, however talks of a Trans-Tasman 'bubble', in which travel between Australia and New Zealand would be exclusively permitted, left the possibility open for the Warriors to return to New Zealand and play home matches there later in the season; however, this did not eventuate.

Despite the border between New South Wales and Queensland remaining closed to the public for most of the season, all NRL teams were exempt from the travel ban for the purpose of playing matches, with the New South Wales-based teams plus the Canberra Raiders and New Zealand Warriors travelling to and from Queensland on game day instead of staying overnight, and the three Queensland-based clubs plus the Melbourne Storm making the same trip in reverse (that is, travelling to and from Sydney or Canberra on game day).

In late June, the Melbourne Storm were forced to relocate away from Victoria after a sharp increase in coronavirus cases in the state. Their round seven match against the New Zealand Warriors was played at Netstrata Jubilee Stadium in Sydney; the match was notable as following the game Cameron Smith, Craig Bellamy and Ryan Hoffman all went into the Warriors' rooms to thank and acknowledge the sacrifices they made by moving to Australia during the COVID pandemic. Following that, the Storm relocated to the Sunshine Coast, Queensland, where they played their remaining home games out of Suncorp Stadium and Sunshine Coast Stadium, as well as finals at the former venue. By the time the Storm won the Premiership, they had been away from their home in Victoria for four months.

==== Club medical restrictions ====
During the pandemic, the NRL brought in strict new biosecurity measures to protect those in the game, including a code-wide request that players be vaccinated against the common flu, as "any player that has any respiratory illness... potentially will take the whole team out." The NSW Government did not enforce the compulsory vaccination agreement, whereas the Queensland Government stood by the vaccination measures previously agreed to by the NRL that 100% of players would be flu-vaccinated prior to the competition restarting. Only players who had been vaccinated, or had genuine medical grounds exempting them, were permitted to play or train in Queensland.

==== Rule changes ====
It was announced that the remainder of the games would be played with just one referee. The referees threatened to strike as a result of this. However, an agreement was reached on 22 May for the one-ref system to be used.

=== Results ===
Team	1	2	3	4	5	6	7	8	9	10	11	12	13	14	15	16	17	18	19	20	F1	F2	F3	GF
Brisbane Broncos	NQL; 7	**SOU**; **4**	**PAR**; **28**	**SYD**; **59**	MAN; 2	NEW; 21	**GCT**; **18**	**NZL**; **10**	**CBY**; **18**	WTI; 48	**MEL**; **38**	**CRO**; **10**	SOU; 18	CAN; 28	**SGI**; **4**	SYD; 46	**PEN**; **13**	GCT; 12	PAR; 14	**NQL**; **16**				
Canberra Raiders	**GCT**; **18**	**NZL**; **14**	MEL; 16	NEW; 16	WTI; 8	MAN; 8	PAR; 1*	**SGI**; **6**	**MEL**; **6**	SYD; 4	**SOU**; **6**	NQL; 2	PEN; 16	**BRI**; **28**	GCT; 20	**CBY**; **14**	**SYD**; **12**	SGI; 29	**NZL**; **12**	CRO; 10	**CRO**; **12**	SYD; 4	MEL; 20	
Canterbury-Bankstown Bulldogs	PAR; 6	**NQL**; **8**	MAN; 26	**SGI**; **20**	**SYD**; **36**	**CRO**; **2**	WTI; 28	**SOU**; **16**	BRI; 18	SGI; 6	NEW; 6	**PAR**; **2**	MEL; 31	WTI; 1	**NZL**; **6**	CAN; 14	**GCT**; **4**	**MAN**; **12**	**SOU**; **10**	**PEN**; **42**				
Cronulla-Sutherland Sharks	SOU; 4	**MEL**; **2**	WTI; 12	NQL; 10	SGI; 14	CBY; 2	MAN; 18	GCT; 30	**PEN**; **32**	**NZL**; **36**	SGI; 4	BRI; 10	**PAR**; **2**	**GCT**; **12**	PEN; 26	**NQL**; **16**	NEW; 28	**NZL**; **8**	SYD; 16	**CAN**; **10**	CAN; 12			
Gold Coast Titans	CAN; 18	**PAR**; **40**	NQL; 30	**WTI**; **5**	SOU; 20	**SGI**; **12**	BRI; 18	**CRO**; **30**	**NZL**; **4**	**MEL**; **36**	**PEN**; **8**	SYD; 6	**NQL**; **20**	CRO; 12	**CAN**; **20**	SGI; 4	CBY; 4	**BRI**; **12**	MAN; 18	**NEW**; **30**				
Manly Warringah Sea Eagles	**MEL**; **14**	SYD; 1	**CBY**; **26**	PAR; 3	**BRI**; **2**	**CAN**; **8**	**CRO**; **18**	**NEW**; **2**	SGI; 30	**PAR**; **4**	NQL; 12	**PEN**; **30**	**NZL**; **4**	NEW; 2	SOU; 40	MEL; 24	**WTI**; **2**	CBY; 12	**GCT**; **18**	**NZL**; **12**				
Melbourne Storm	MAN; 14	CRO; 2	**CAN**; **16**	**SOU**; **14**	NEW; 14	PEN; 7	**NZL**; **44**	**SYD**; **2***	CAN; 6	GCT; 36	BRI; 38	**NEW**; **10**	**CBY**; **31**	SYD; 18	PAR; 14	**MAN**; **24**	SOU; 6	NQL; 16	**WTI**; **28**	SGI; 8	**PAR**; **12**	X	**CAN**; **20**	PEN; 6
Newcastle Knights	**NZL**; **20**	WTI; 18	PEN; 0*	**CAN**; **16**	**MEL**; **14**	**BRI**; **21**	NQL; 12	MAN; 2	**PAR**; **6**	SOU; 2	**CBY**; **6**	MEL; 10	**WTI**; **40**	**MAN**; **2**	**NQL**; **12**	**NZL**; **30**	**CRO**; **28**	SYD; 30	**SGI**; **24**	GCT; 30	SOU; 26			
New Zealand Warriors	NEW; 20	CAN; 14	SGI; 18	PEN; 26	NQL; 11	SOU; 28	MEL; 44	BRI; 10	GCT; 4	CRO; 36	SYD; 8	WTI; 6	MAN; 4	PEN; 6	CBY; 6	NEW; 30	PAR; 6	CRO; 8	CAN; 12	MAN; 12				
North Queensland Cowboys	**BRI**; **7**	CBY; 8	**GCT**; **30**	**CRO**; **10**	**NZL**; **11**	WTI; 16	**NEW**; **12**	PAR; 38	**SYD**; **26**	PEN; 12	**MAN**; **12**	**CAN**; **2**	GCT; 20	**SOU**; **1**	NEW; 12	CRO; 16	**SGI**; **1***	**MEL**; **16**	**PEN**; **20**	BRI; 16				
Parramatta Eels	**CBY**; **6**	GCT; 40	BRI; 28	**MAN**; **3**	**PEN**; **6**	**SYD**; **14**	**CAN**; **1***	**NQL**; **38**	NEW; 6	MAN; 4	**WTI**; **10**	CBY; 2	CRO; 2	**SGI**; **2**	**MEL**; **14**	**SOU**; **38**	**NZL**; **6**	PEN; 18	**BRI**; **14**	**WTI**; **4**	MEL; 12	**SOU**; **14**		
Penrith Panthers	**SYD**; **6**	SGI; 4	**NEW**; **0***	**NZL**; **26**	PAR; 6	**MEL**; **7**	**SOU**; **8**	WTI; 7	CRO; 32	**NQL**; **12**	GCT; 8	MAN; 30	**CAN**; **16**	**NZL**; **6**	**CRO**; **26**	**WTI**; **24**	BRI; 13	**PAR**; **18**	NQL; 20	CBY; 42	**SYD**; **1**	X	SOU; 4	**MEL**; **6**
South Sydney Rabbitohs	**CRO**; **4**	BRI; 4	**SYD**; **16**	MEL; 14	**GCT**; **20**	**NZL**; **28**	PEN; 8	CBY; 16	WTI; 8	**NEW**; **2**	CAN; 6	SGI; 8	**BRI**; **18**	NQL; 1	**MAN**; **40**	PAR; 38	**MEL**; **6**	WTI; 2	CBY; 10	**SYD**; **52**	**NEW**; **26**	PAR; 14	**PEN**; **4**	
St. George Illawarra Dragons	**WTI**; **10**	**PEN**; **4**	**NZL**; **18**	CBY; 20	**CRO**; **14**	GCT; 12	SYD; 14	CAN; 6	**MAN**; **30**	**CBY**; **6**	**CRO**; **4**	**SOU**; **8**	**SYD**; **8**	PAR; 2	BRI; 4	**GCT**; **4**	NQL; 1*	**CAN**; **29**	NEW; 24	**MEL**; **8**				
Sydney Roosters	PEN; 6	**MAN**; **1**	SOU; 16	BRI; 59	CBY; 36	PAR; 14	**SGI**; **14**	MEL; 2*	NQL; 26	**CAN**; **4**	**NZL**; **8**	**GCT**; **6**	SGI; 8	**MEL**; **18**	WTI; 22	**BRI**; **46**	CAN; 12	**NEW**; **30**	**CRO**; **16**	SOU; 52	PEN; 1	**CAN**; **4**		
Wests Tigers	SGI; 10	**NEW**; **18**	**CRO**; **12**	GCT; 5	**CAN**; **8**	**NQL**; **16**	**CBY**; **28**	**PEN**; **7**	**SOU**; **8**	**BRI**; **48**	PAR; 10	**NZL**; **6**	NEW; 40	**CBY**; **1**	**SYD**; **22**	PEN; 24	MAN; 2	**SOU**; **2**	MEL; 28	PAR; 4				
Team	1	2	3	4	5	6	7	8	9	10	11	12	13	14	15	16	17	18	19	20	F1	F2	F3	GF

Bold – Home game
X – Bye
* – Golden point game
Opponent for round listed above margin

== Ladder ==
Pos	Team	Pld	W	D	L	B	PF	PA	PD	Pts	
1	Penrith Panthers (M)	20	18	1	1	0	537	238	+299	37	Advance to finals series
2	Melbourne Storm (P)	20	16	0	4	0	534	276	+258	32	Advance to finals series
3	Parramatta Eels	20	15	0	5	0	392	288	+104	30	Advance to finals series
4	Sydney Roosters	20	14	0	6	0	552	322	+230	28	Advance to finals series
5	Canberra Raiders	20	14	0	6	0	445	317	+128	28	Advance to finals series
6	South Sydney Rabbitohs	20	12	0	8	0	521	352	+169	24	Advance to finals series
7	Newcastle Knights	20	11	1	8	0	421	374	+47	23	Advance to finals series
8	Cronulla-Sutherland Sharks	20	10	0	10	0	480	480	0	20	Advance to finals series
9	Gold Coast Titans	20	9	0	11	0	346	463	−117	18	
10	New Zealand Warriors	20	8	0	12	0	343	458	−115	16	
11	Wests Tigers	20	7	0	13	0	440	505	−65	14	
12	St. George Illawarra Dragons	20	7	0	13	0	378	452	−74	14	
13	Manly Warringah Sea Eagles	20	7	0	13	0	375	509	−134	14	
14	North Queensland Cowboys	20	5	0	15	0	368	520	−152	10	
15	Canterbury-Bankstown Bulldogs	20	3	0	17	0	282	504	−222	6	
16	Brisbane Broncos (W)	20	3	0	17	0	268	624	−356	6	

Updated to match(es) played on 27 September 2020. Source: 2020 NRL Ladder
(M) Minor premiers; (P) Premiers; (W) Wooden spoon

=== Ladder progression ===
- Numbers highlighted in green indicate that the team finished the round inside the top 8.
- Numbers highlighted in blue indicates the team finished first on the ladder in that round.
- Numbers highlighted in red indicates the team finished last place on the ladder in that round.
- Underlined numbers indicate that the team had a bye during that round.

	Team	1	2	3	4	5	6	7	8	9	10	11	12	13	14	15	16	17	18	19	20
1	Penrith Panthers	2	4	5	7	7	9	11	13	15	17	19	21	23	25	27	29	31	33	35	37
2	Melbourne Storm (P)	2	4	4	6	8	8	10	12	14	16	18	20	22	24	24	26	28	30	32	32
3	Parramatta Eels	2	4	6	8	10	10	12	14	16	16	18	20	22	22	24	24	26	26	28	30
4	Sydney Roosters	0	0	2	4	6	8	10	10	12	12	14	16	18	18	20	22	24	26	28	28
5	Canberra Raiders	2	4	6	6	8	8	8	10	10	12	14	16	16	18	20	22	22	24	26	28
6	South Sydney Rabbitohs	2	2	2	2	4	6	6	8	10	10	10	12	14	16	18	20	20	22	22	24
7	Newcastle Knights	2	4	5	7	7	9	9	11	11	13	13	13	15	17	19	19	21	21	23	23
8	Cronulla-Sutherland Sharks	0	0	0	2	2	4	6	8	8	10	12	14	14	16	16	18	18	20	20	20
9	Gold Coast Titans	0	0	0	2	2	2	4	4	6	6	6	6	8	8	8	10	12	14	16	18
10	New Zealand Warriors	0	0	2	2	4	4	4	6	6	6	6	8	10	10	12	14	14	14	14	16
11	Wests Tigers	2	2	4	4	4	6	8	8	8	10	10	10	10	12	12	12	14	14	14	14
12	St. George Illawarra Dragons	0	0	0	0	2	4	4	4	6	8	8	8	8	10	12	12	12	12	12	14
13	Manly Warringah Sea Eagles	0	2	4	4	6	8	8	8	8	10	12	12	12	12	12	12	12	14	14	14
14	North Queensland Cowboys	0	2	4	4	4	4	6	6	6	6	6	6	6	6	6	6	8	8	8	10
15	Canterbury-Bankstown Bulldogs	0	0	0	2	2	2	2	2	2	2	4	4	4	4	4	4	4	4	6	6
16	Brisbane Broncos	2	4	4	4	4	4	4	4	6	6	6	6	6	6	6	6	6	6	6	6

== Finals series ==
Home	Score	Away	Match Information
Home	Score	Away	Date and Time (Local)	Venue	Referees	Crowd
QUALIFYING & ELIMINATION FINALS
Penrith Panthers	29 – 28	Sydney Roosters	2 October 2020, 7:50 pm	Panthers Stadium	Gerard Sutton	7,209
Canberra Raiders	32 – 20	Cronulla-Sutherland Sharks	3 October 2020, 5:40 pm	GIO Stadium Canberra	Grant Atkins	9,602
Melbourne Storm	36 – 24	Parramatta Eels	3 October 2020, 7:50 pm	Suncorp Stadium	Ashley Klein	16,238
South Sydney Rabbitohs	46 – 20	Newcastle Knights	4 October 2020, 4:05 pm	ANZ Stadium	Ben Cummins	17,212
SEMI FINALS
Sydney Roosters	18 – 22	Canberra Raiders	9 October 2020, 7:55 pm	Sydney Cricket Ground	Ashley Klein	18,110
Parramatta Eels	24 – 38	South Sydney Rabbitohs	10 October 2020, 7:50 pm	Bankwest Stadium	Gerard Sutton	14,510
PRELIMINARY FINALS
Melbourne Storm	30 – 10	Canberra Raiders	16 October 2020, 7:50 pm	Suncorp Stadium	Ashley Klein	37,112
Penrith Panthers	20 – 16	South Sydney Rabbitohs	17 October 2020, 7:50 pm	ANZ Stadium	Gerard Sutton	30,116

=== Chart ===
Qualifying and elimination finals
2 Oct, Panthers Stadium
1	Penrith	29
4	Sydney	28
3 Oct, GIO Stadium Canberra
5	Canberra	32
8	Cronulla-Sutherland	20
4 Oct, ANZ Stadium
6	South Sydney	46
7	Newcastle	20
3 Oct, Suncorp Stadium
2	Melbourne	36
3	Parramatta	24

Semi-finals
9 Oct, Sydney Cricket Ground
Sydney	18
Canberra	22
10 Oct, Bankwest Stadium
Parramatta	24
South Sydney	38

Preliminary finals
17 Oct, ANZ Stadium
Penrith	20
South Sydney	16
16 Oct, Suncorp Stadium
Melbourne	30
Canberra	10

Grand final
25 Oct, ANZ Stadium
Penrith	20
Melbourne	26

== Grand Final ==
2020 NRL Grand Final

Sunday, 25 October
19:40 AEDT (UTC+11)

Penrith Panthers	20 – 26	Melbourne Storm
Tries: 4 To'o 52'; Crichton 68'; Mansour 71'; Cleary 79'; Goals: 2 Cleary 53', 69' (2/3)	1st: 0–22; 2nd: 20–4; Report	Tries: 4 Olam (penalty) 3'; Vunivalu 30'; C. Smith 39'; Papenhuzen 45'; Goals: 5 C. Smith 4', pen 22', pen 26', 31', 40' (5/6); Sin bin: Hughes (yellow card) 70' to 80'; B. Smith (yellow card) 79' to 80'

ANZ Stadium, Sydney
Attendance: 37,303
Referee: Gerard Sutton
Touch judges: Chris Butler, Todd Smith
Clive Churchill Medal: Ryan Papenhuyzen (Melbourne)

== Player statistics and records ==
The following statistics are as of the conclusion of Round 20.

Top 5 point scorers

Points	Player	Tries	Goals	Field Goals
191	Adam Reynolds	6	83	1
184	Kyle Flanagan	4	84	0
178	Zac Lomax	13	63	0
171	Nathan Cleary	4	76	3
148	Cameron Smith	2	70	0

Top 5 try scorers

Tries	Player
20	Alex Johnston
19	Kyle Feldt
17	David Nofoaluma
15	Stephen Crichton
15	Josh Addo-Carr
15	Maika Sivo
15	Sione Katoa

Top 5 goal scorers

Goals	Player
84	Kyle Flanagan
83	Adam Reynolds
76	Nathan Cleary
70	Cameron Smith
63	Jarrod Croker
63	Zac Lomax

Top 5 tacklers

Tackles	Player
978	Cameron McInnes
955	Damien Cook
888	Reed Mahoney
876	Patrick Carrigan
852	Jake Trbojevic

== 2020 Transfers ==
=== Players ===
Player	2019 Club	2020 Club
Shaun Fensom	Brisbane Broncos	Retirement
Matt Gillett	Brisbane Broncos	Retirement
Andrew McCullough	Brisbane Broncos	Newcastle Knights
Kodi Nikorima	Brisbane Broncos	New Zealand Warriors
James Roberts	Brisbane Broncos	South Sydney Rabbitohs
James Segeyaro	Brisbane Broncos	Suspension
Jaydn Su'A	Brisbane Broncos	South Sydney Rabbitohs
Luke Bateman	Canberra Raiders	Hiatus
Ata Hingano	Canberra Raiders	Mackay Cutters (Intrust Super Cup)
Joseph Leilua	Canberra Raiders	Wests Tigers
Aidan Sezer	Canberra Raiders	Super League: Huddersfield Giants
Fa'amanu Brown	Canterbury-Bankstown Bulldogs	N/A
Danny Fualalo	Canterbury-Bankstown Bulldogs	Retirement
Corey Harawira-Naera	Canterbury-Bankstown Bulldogs	Canberra Raiders
Michael Lichaa	Canterbury-Bankstown Bulldogs	Retirement
Rhyse Martin	Canterbury-Bankstown Bulldogs	Super League: Leeds Rhinos
Jayden Brailey	Cronulla-Sutherland Sharks	Newcastle Knights
Jayson Bukuya	Cronulla-Sutherland Sharks	Retirement
Kurt Capewell	Cronulla-Sutherland Sharks	Penrith Panthers
Sosaia Feki	Cronulla-Sutherland Sharks	Super League: Castleford Tigers
Paul Gallen	Cronulla-Sutherland Sharks	Retirement
Josh Morris	Cronulla-Sutherland Sharks	Sydney Roosters
Matt Prior	Cronulla-Sutherland Sharks	Super League: Leeds Rhinos
Michael Gordon	Gold Coast Titans	Retirement
Ryley Jacks	Gold Coast Titans	Melbourne Storm
Max King	Gold Coast Titans	Melbourne Storm
Leilani Latu	Gold Coast Titans	Super League: Warrington Wolves
Brenko Lee	Gold Coast Titans	Melbourne Storm
Will Matthews	Gold Coast Titans	Retirement
Jack Stockwell	Gold Coast Titans	Burleigh Bears (Intrust Super Cup)
Kallum Watkins	Gold Coast Titans	Super League: Salford Red Devils
Kane Elgey	Manly Warringah Sea Eagles	Retirement
Trent Hodkinson	Manly Warringah Sea Eagles	Retirement
Apisai Koroisau	Manly Warringah Sea Eagles	Penrith Panthers
Lloyd Perrett	Manly Warringah Sea Eagles	Wynnum Manly Seagulls (Intrust Super Cup)
Kelepi Tanginoa	Manly Warringah Sea Eagles	Super League: Wakefield Trinity
Will Chambers	Melbourne Storm	Suntory Sungoliath (Japanese rugby union)
Brodie Croft	Melbourne Storm	Brisbane Broncos
Curtis Scott	Melbourne Storm	Canberra Raiders
Joe Stimson	Melbourne Storm	Canterbury-Bankstown Bulldogs
Jamie Buhrer	Newcastle Knights	Retirement
James Gavet	Newcastle Knights	Super League: Huddersfield Giants
Shaun Kenny-Dowall	Newcastle Knights	Super League: Hull Kingston Rovers
Danny Levi	Newcastle Knights	Manly Warringah Sea Eagles
Jesse Ramien	Newcastle Knights	Cronulla-Sutherland Sharks
Blake Ayshford	New Zealand Warriors	Retirement
Solomone Kata	New Zealand Warriors	ACT Brumbies (Super Rugby)
Sam Lisone	New Zealand Warriors	Gold Coast Titans
Issac Luke	New Zealand Warriors	St. George Illawarra Dragons
Ligi Sao	New Zealand Warriors	Super League: Hull F.C.
Kurt Baptiste	North Queensland Cowboys	Eastern Suburbs Tigers (Intrust Super Cup)
Scott Bolton	North Queensland Cowboys	Retirement
Javid Bowen	North Queensland Cowboys	Northern Pride (Intrust Super Cup)
Jordan Kahu	North Queensland Cowboys	Brisbane Broncos
Nene Macdonald	North Queensland Cowboys	Cronulla-Sutherland Sharks
Te Maire Martin	North Queensland Cowboys	N/A
Matt Scott	North Queensland Cowboys	Retirement
Josh Hoffman	Parramatta Eels	Townsville Blackhawks (Intrust Super Cup)
Tim Mannah	Parramatta Eels	Retirement
Manu Ma'u	Parramatta Eels	Super League: Hull F.C.
Tepai Moeroa	Parramatta Eels	New South Wales Waratahs (Super Rugby)
Waqa Blake	Penrith Panthers	Parramatta Eels
Reagan Campbell-Gillard	Penrith Panthers	Parramatta Eels
Wayde Egan	Penrith Panthers	New Zealand Warriors
Tyrell Fuimaono	Penrith Panthers	St. George Illawarra Dragons
Tim Grant	Penrith Panthers	Retirement
Sione Katoa	Penrith Panthers	Canterbury-Bankstown Bulldogs
James Maloney	Penrith Panthers	Super League: Catalans Dragons
Dallin Watene-Zelezniak	Penrith Panthers	Canterbury-Bankstown Bulldogs
Frank Winterstein	Penrith Panthers	Toulouse Olympique
George Burgess	South Sydney Rabbitohs	Super League: Wigan Warriors
Sam Burgess	South Sydney Rabbitohs	Retirement
Adam Doueihi	South Sydney Rabbitohs	Wests Tigers
Greg Inglis	South Sydney Rabbitohs	N/A
John Sutton	South Sydney Rabbitohs	Retirement
Kyle Turner	South Sydney Rabbitohs	Retirement
Mitchell Allgood	St. George Illawarra Dragons	London Broncos (Championship)
James Graham	St. George Illawarra Dragons	Super League: St. Helens
Patrick Kaufusi	St. George Illawarra Dragons	Townsville Blackhawks (Intrust Super Cup)
Tim Lafai	St. George Illawarra Dragons	Canterbury-Bankstown Bulldogs
Jeremy Latimore	St. George Illawarra Dragons	Retirement
Luciano Leilua	St. George Illawarra Dragons	Wests Tigers
Lachlan Maranta	St. George Illawarra Dragons	Wynnum Manly Seagulls (Intrust Super Cup)
Gareth Widdop	St. George Illawarra Dragons	Super League: Warrington Wolves
Cooper Cronk	Sydney Roosters	Retirement
Latrell Mitchell	Sydney Roosters	South Sydney Rabbitohs
Zane Tetevano	Sydney Roosters	Penrith Panthers
Robbie Farah	Wests Tigers	Retirement
Mahe Fonua	Wests Tigers	Super League: Hull F.C.
Esan Marsters	Wests Tigers	North Queensland Cowboys
Ryan Matterson	Wests Tigers	Parramatta Eels
Ben Matulino	Wests Tigers	Retirement
Corey Thompson	Wests Tigers	Gold Coast Titans
Brayden Wiliame	Super League: Catalans Dragons	St. George Illawarra Dragons
Matt Frawley	Super League: Huddersfield Giants	Canberra Raiders
Trent Merrin	Super League: Leeds Rhinos	St. George Illawarra Dragons
Bryson Goodwin	Super League: Warrington Wolves	Cronulla-Sutherland Sharks
George Williams	Super League: Wigan Warriors	Canberra Raiders
Ben Te'o	Sunwolves (Super Rugby)	Brisbane Broncos
Valentine Holmes	New York Jets (NFL)	North Queensland Cowboys
Young Tonumaipea	Hiatus	Gold Coast Titans
Zane Musgrove	N/A	Wests Tigers

=== Loan moves ===
Player	Home club	→ Loan club	Dates	Pld	Ref
Harry Grant	Melbourne Storm	Wests Tigers	21 March – 26 October (Round 3 – end of season)	15	
Paul Momirovski	Wests Tigers	Melbourne Storm	21 March – 26 October (Round 3 – end of season)	6	
Poasa Faamausili	Sydney Roosters	New Zealand Warriors	31 May – 27 June (Rounds 4 – 8)	4	
Jack Hetherington	Penrith Panthers	New Zealand Warriors	28 June – 7 August (Rounds 8 – 13)	6	
George Jennings	Parramatta Eels	New Zealand Warriors	24 July – 13 August (Rounds 12 – 18)	6	
Daniel Alvaro	Parramatta Eels	New Zealand Warriors	24 July – 13 August (Rounds 12 – 18)	6	
Albert Hopoate	Manly Warringah Sea Eagles	New Zealand Warriors	14 August – 24 August	0 (Note: Hopoate's month-long loan spell ended prematurely after he was recalled by Manly before making his Warriors debut.)	

=== Coaches ===
Coach	2019 Club	2020 Club
Justin Holbrook	Super League: St. Helens	Gold Coast Titans
