= Albert Jones (footballer, born 1883) =

Welsh footballer (1883–1963)

Personal information
- Date of birth: 6 February 1883
- Place of birth: Talgarth, Wales
- Date of death: 1963
- Place of death: Belper, England
- Position: Full-back

Youth career
- –1902: Builth Wells

Senior career*
Years	Team	Apps	(Gls)
1902–1903	Swindon Town	22	(0)
1903–1905	Nottingham Forest		
1905–1907	Notts County		

International career
1905–1906	Wales	2	(0)
- * Club domestic league appearances and goals

Albert Jones (6 February 1883 – 1963) was a Welsh footballer who played as a full-back. He was part of the Wales national team between 1905 and 1906, playing two matches. He played his first match on 22 March 1905 against England and his last match on 19 March 1906 against England. At club level, he played for Notts County and Nottingham Forest.

He was the brother of fellow Wales international Gordon Jones.

== See also ==
- List of Wales international footballers (alphabetical)
