= Beau Falloon =

Australian rugby league footballer

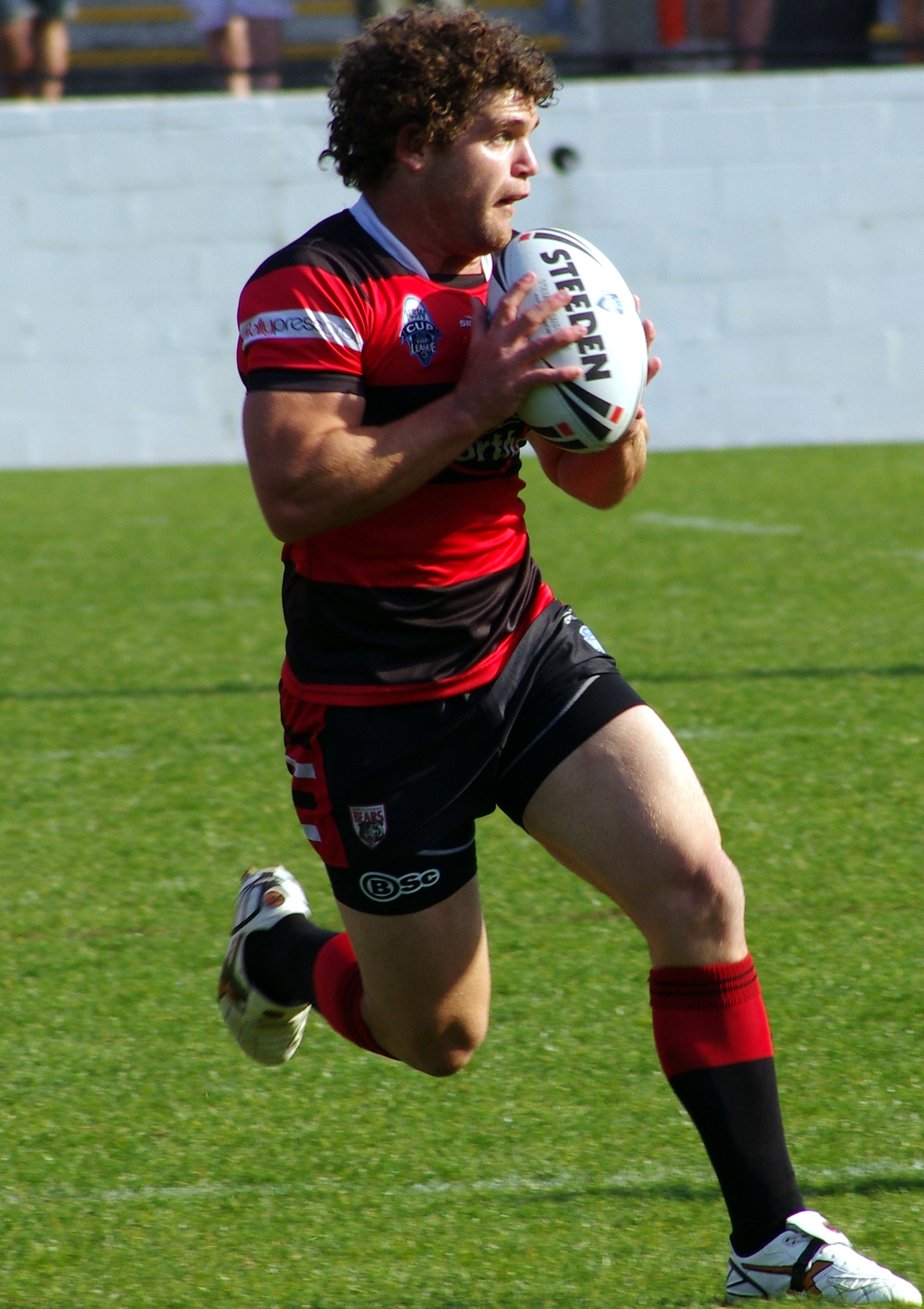

Personal information
- Born: 21 May 1987 (age 38); Sydney, New South Wales, Australia

Playing information
- Height: 178 cm (5 ft 10 in)
- Weight: 86 kg (13 st 8 lb)
- Position: Hooker
Club
Years	Team	Pld	T	G	FG	P
2008–10	South Sydney	25	3	0	0	12
2012–15	Gold Coast Titans	60	6	0	0	24
2016	Leeds Rhinos	10	0	0	0	0
	Total	95	9	0	0	36
Representative
Years	Team	Pld	T	G	FG	P
2014	NSW City	1	0	0	0	0

Beau Falloon (born 21 May 1987) is a former professional rugby league footballer who last played for Leeds in the Super League. He played as a hooker and previously played for the South Sydney Rabbitohs and Gold Coast Titans in the National Rugby League.

== Background ==
Falloon was born in Sydney, New South Wales, Australia.

== Playing career ==
Falloon played with the South Sydney Rabbitohs for 3 seasons making 25 appearances. Falloon spent most of his playing time during this period with Souths feeder side the North Sydney Bears. At Norths, Falloon made a total of 53 appearances and scored 15 tries.

He joined the Gold Coast Titans in 2012. On 15 February 2015, Fallon was suspended as revelations unfold pertaining to the Karmichael Hunt/Smith/Seers cocaine trafficking investigation – Court date 5 March 2015. Although the charges against Falloon were thrown out of court, The Gold Coast side announced that they would not be re-signing Falloon for the following season.

On 23 October 2015, Falloon signed a one-year contract with Super League champions, Leeds Rhinos, starting in 2016.
