= James Soto Roberts =

Liberian footballer (born 1992)

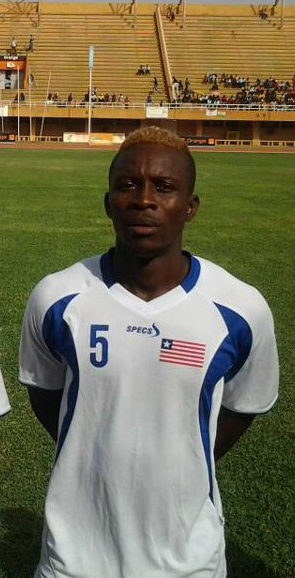

Personal information
- Date of birth: 10 January 1992 (age 34)
- Place of birth: Buchanan, Liberia
- Height: 5 ft 9 in (1.75 m)
- Position: Forward

Youth career
- 2007–2010: Black Star F.C.

Senior career*
Years	Team	Apps	(Gls)
2008–2010	Black Star F.C.	45	(35)
2010–2014	LPRC Oilers	60	(45)
2015–2016	The Lions	12	(6)

International career
	Liberia	7	(2)
2011–2015	Liberia	11	(1)
- * Club domestic league appearances and goals

James Soto Roberts (born 10 January 1992), commonly known as Soto, is a Liberian former professional footballer who played as a forward in his home country as well for The Lions in the Seychelles League. He made 11 appearances for the Liberia national team, scoring once.

== Club career ==
Born in Buchanan, Grand Bassa County, Soto started his playing career at Black Star where he won the Liberian Premier League and the Liberian Cup the 2008–09 season, he was also the league top scorer and MVP that same year, before later moving to LPRC Oilers.

In July 2014, Soto moved from LPRC Oilers to The Lions in the Seychelles League on a one year loan. He scored 6 goals in 12 appearances for The Lions during the 2014–15 season.

== International career ==
Soto represented the Liberia under-23 national team in the 2011 WAFU Nations Cup and was also called up to the Liberia national team in the 2011–12 African Cup of Nations qualification.

== Honours ==
Liberia Black Star FC

- Liberian Premier League: 2007–08
- Liberian Cup: 2008

Individual

- Liberian Premier League top scorer: 2007–08, 2013–14
- Liberian Premier League MVP: 2008
