= Arthur Green (Welsh footballer) =

Welsh footballer

Personal information
- Full name: Arthur William Green
- Date of birth: 5 December 1881
- Place of birth: Aberystwyth, Wales
- Date of death: 24 September 1966 (aged 85)
- Position: Centre forward

Senior career*
Years	Team	Apps	(Gls)
1897–1898	Aberystwyth		
1899–1900	Swindon Town	4	(2)
1900–1901	Aston Villa	0	(0)
1898–1899	Ebbw Vale		
1901–1902	Walsall		
1902–1907	Notts County	134	(56)
1907–1909	Nottingham Forest	38	(19)
1909–1910	Stockport County	7	(1)
1910–1912	Brierley Hill Alliance		
1912	Stourbridge		
1912–1913	Kidderminster Harriers		
1913	Dudley		
1913	Walsall		
1914	Dudley		
1914	Worcester City		

International career
1901–1908	Wales	8	(3)
- * Club domestic league appearances and goals

Arthur William Green (5 December 1881 – 24 September 1966) was a Welsh professional footballer who made over 130 appearances as a centre forward in the Football League for Notts County. He also played League football for Nottingham Forest and Stockport County and was capped by Wales at international level.

== International career ==
Green won eight caps and scored three goals for the Wales national team between 1901 and 1908. He was part of the 1906–07 British Home Championship-winning squad.

== Personal life ==
Green served in the British Armed Forces during the First World War.

== Career statistics ==
Appearances and goals by club, season and competition
Club	Season	League			FA Cup		Total	
Club	Season	Division	Apps	Goals	Apps	Goals	Apps	Goals
Swindon Town	1899–1900	Southern League First Division	4	2	―		4	2
Nottingham Forest	1906–07	Second Division	13	6	0	0	13	6
Nottingham Forest	1907–08	First Division	19	8	0	0	19	8
Nottingham Forest	1908–09	First Division	6	3	0	0	6	3
Nottingham Forest	Total		38	17	0	0	38	17
Stockport County	1909–10	Second Division	7	1	0	0	7	1
Career total			49	20	0	0	20	20

== Honours ==
Nottingham Forest

- Football League Second Division: 1906–07

Wales

- British Home Championship: 1906–07
