= David Hala =

Tonga international rugby league footballer

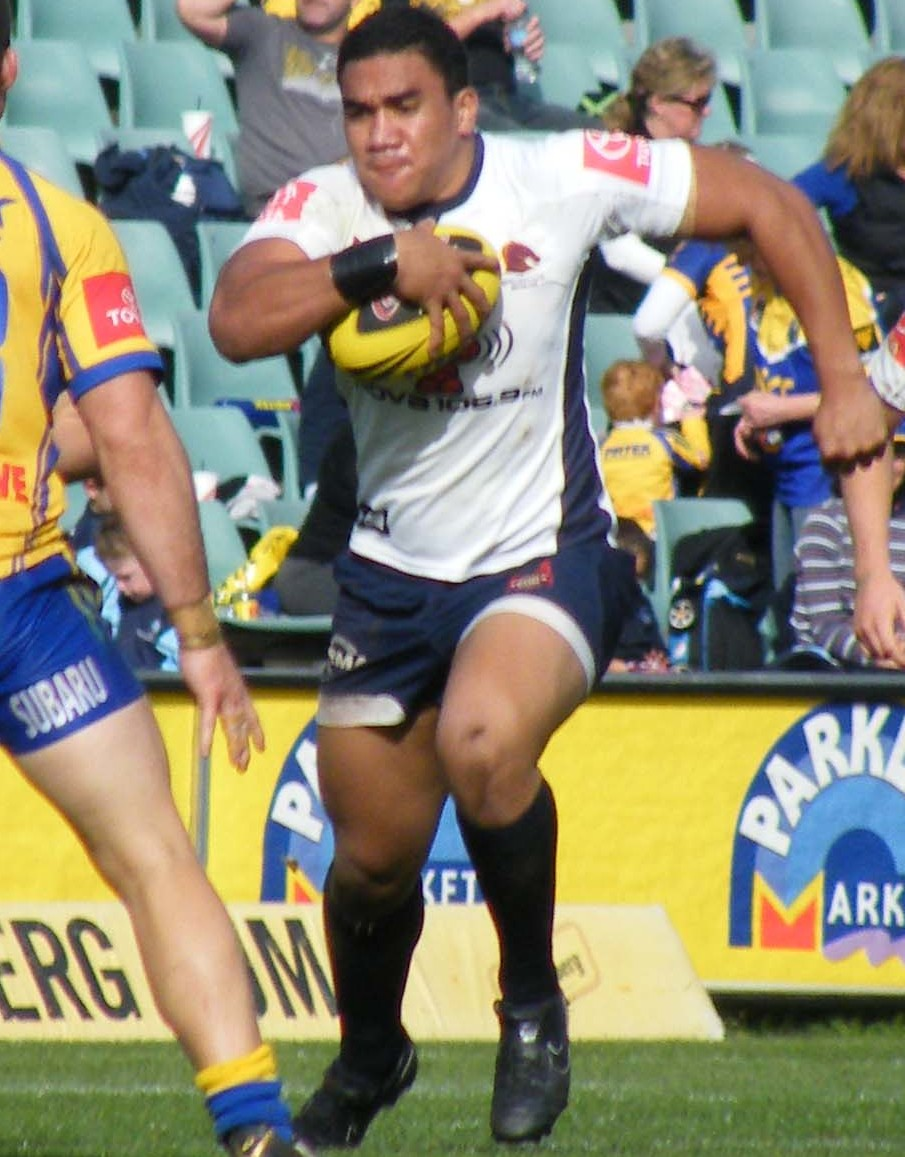

Personal information
- Born: 25 October 1989 (age 37) Redcliffe, Queensland, Australia
- Height: 187 cm (6 ft 2 in)
- Weight: 120 kg (18 st 13 lb)

Playing information
- Position: Prop
Club
| Years | Team | Pld | T | G | FG | P |
|---|---|---|---|---|---|---|
| 2009–14 | Brisbane Broncos | 37 | 3 | 0 | 0 | 12 |
| 2015–16 | Gold Coast Titans | 2 | 0 | 0 | 0 | 0 |
| | Total | 39 | 3 | 0 | 0 | 12 |
Representative
| Years | Team | Pld | T | G | FG | P |
| 2013–14 | Tonga | 2 | 0 | 0 | 0 | 0 |
- Source: As of 10 August 2015

David Hala (born 25 October 1989) is a Tonga international rugby league footballer who last played for the Redcliffe Dolphins in the Queensland Cup. He previously played for the Brisbane Broncos and the Gold Coast Titans in the NRL. He made his NRL debut in round 21 of the 2009 NRL season.

He was recorded as the Broncos strongest ever player bench pressing a new record of 187 kg, the previous being Brad Thorn's 175 kg.

== Background ==
Hala was born in Redcliffe, Queensland, Australia. He is of Tongan descent.

== Playing career ==
Hala played his junior rugby league for the Redcliffe Dolphins, before he was signed by the Sydney Roosters for an $80,000 contract.

=== 2008 ===
In 2008, Hala played for the Sydney Roosters under-20s team.

=== 2009 ===
In 2009, Hala played for the Brisbane Broncos under-20s team. Whilst playing for the under-20s team he then was selected to make his debut against the Canberra Raiders in a 0–56 loss to Canberra in round 21. He played one game in 2009 in the NRL from the bench.

=== 2010 ===
In 2010, Hala played for the Redcliffe Dolphins before he suffered a season-ending injury he did not play first grade the whole of the 2010 season.

=== 2011 ===
In 2011, Hala started the year playing for the Redcliffe Dolphins then, in round 9, he got selected to play first grade for the Brisbane Broncos in the round nine clash against the Melbourne Storm and in round 15, he scored his first NRL career try, against the St George Illawarra Dragons. He played 15 games all off the bench in 2011 for a try and also played in the 3 finals games for the Brisbane Broncos.

=== 2012 ===
In 2012, Hala started the year injured and, in round 12, he played against the Melbourne Storm from the interchange bench and suffered a season-ending knee injury. He played one game in 2012, that game was from the interchange bench.

=== 2013 ===
In 2013, Hala played every game for the Broncos from round 5, against the Gold Coast Titans, until round 18, against the Cronulla-Sutherland Sharks, where he injured his shoulder and was forced to have season ending surgery. He played 13 games in 2013 12 from the bench and started once against the Cronulla-Sutherland Sharks.

Hala was selected for Tonga as 18th man in the 2013 Polynesian Cup against Samoa. But due to a late injury to Nafe Seluini, he was added to the bench.

=== 2014 ===
In 2014, Hala played for both Broncos and Redcliffe throughout the season. He played in rounds 3, 9–11, 15–16 and 18 for the Broncos that year. He scored two tries for the Broncos against the Cronulla-Sutherland Sharks when he left the field Brisbane were leading 22–0 and then went on to lose 22–24. On 29 October 2014, he was released from his contract with the Broncos. On 3 November 2014, he signed with the Gold Coast Titans on a two-year contract starting in 2015.

=== 2015 ===
In round 22, Hala made his Gold Coast debut in the Titans' 36–14 loss to the Melbourne Storm. Hala made one further appearance for the Gold Coast as the club finished 14th on the table.

=== 2016 ===
He left the Gold Coast in July 2016, re-joining the Redcliffe Dolphins.

== Post playing ==
As of 2017, Hala was training as a Shot put athlete after retiring from the NRL.
