= Jim Roberts (Australian footballer) =

Australian rules footballer

Personal information
- Full name: James Vivian Roberts
- Born: 19 November 1931
- Died: 12 August 2013 (aged 81); Geelong, Victoria
- Original team: Orford
- Height: 180 cm (5 ft 11 in)
- Weight: 72 kg (159 lb)

Playing career^{1}
Years	Club	Games (Goals)
1953–56	Geelong	21 (3)
- ^{1} Playing statistics correct to the end of 1956.

James Vivian Roberts (19 November 1931 – 12 August 2013) was an Australian rules footballer who played with Geelong in the Victorian Football League (VFL).
