= Dicky Bond =

English footballer (1883-1955)

Personal information
- Full name: Richard Bond
- Date of birth: 14 December 1883
- Place of birth: Preston, England
- Date of death: 25 April 1955 (aged 71)
- Place of death: Preston, England
- Height: 5 ft 6 1/2 in (1.69 m)
- Position: Outside right

Youth career
- –1901: Royal Field Artillery

Senior career*
Years	Team	Apps	(Gls)
1902–1909	Preston North End	148	(34)
1909–1922	Bradford City	301	(60)
1922–1923	Blackburn Rovers	24	(2)
1923–1924	Lancaster Town		
- Garstang Town

International career
1905–1910	England	8	(2)
	Football League XI	1	
- * Club domestic league appearances and goals

Richard Bond (14 December 1883 – 25 April 1955) was an English footballer who played outside right. He was capped eight times by England and spent the vast majority of his playing career at Bradford City where he played more than 300 games.

== Club playing career ==
=== Preston North End ===
Born in Garstang, England, Bond started his career with the Royal Artillery before he signed professional forms with Preston North End in August 1902. He was part of Preston's Division Two championship winning team in 1903–04. Two years later, he was a regular, as the club were The Football League runners-up.

=== Bradford City ===
Bond joined Bradford City in May 1909 for a £950 fee, a record fee for Preston at the time. Bond represented City during the most successful spell in its history. But he missed out on the club's 1911 FA Cup triumph because he was suspended after using improper language at Woolwich Arsenal. He had scored two goals in three appearances earlier in the cup run.

In total he played 301 league games, scoring 60 goals, all in the top flight. He also represented the club in 32 FA Cup games scoring 12 times. He was selected in City's team of the millennium in 1999 by former Telegraph & Argus sports reporter David Markham. He served with the Bradford Pals during the First World War before returning to City in 1919. He was appointed club captain in 1920. But the side were relegated in 1921–22 prompting his transfer to Blackburn Rovers.

=== Blackburn Rovers ===
Bond played for Blackburn for one season before his final move to Lancaster Town in August 1923 for one last season. He retired in 1924 but returned to play for Garstang Town two years later. His total league career brought him 96 goals in 473 league appearances. He became a publican before he died in Preston aged 71.

== International career ==
Bond made his first international appearance for England while at Preston on 25 February 1905 against Ireland. He won a total of eight caps, scoring twice, both against Ireland in 1906.

== Honours ==
Preston North End

- Football League Second Division: 1903–04

== Personal life ==
Bond's football career was interrupted by the First World War. He was serving as a sergeant in the Prince of Wales's Own (West Yorkshire Regiment) when he was taken prisoner-of-war in July 1916. He was repatriated on 18 November 1918 and more than two years after it had finished, he laid a commemorative wreath at the Cenotaph in London before Bradford City's game with Arsenal on 1 January 1921. After his retirement from football, Bond ran a fish and chip shop in Garstang and later became a publican.
