= Matt Srama =

Philippines international rugby league footballer (born 1991)

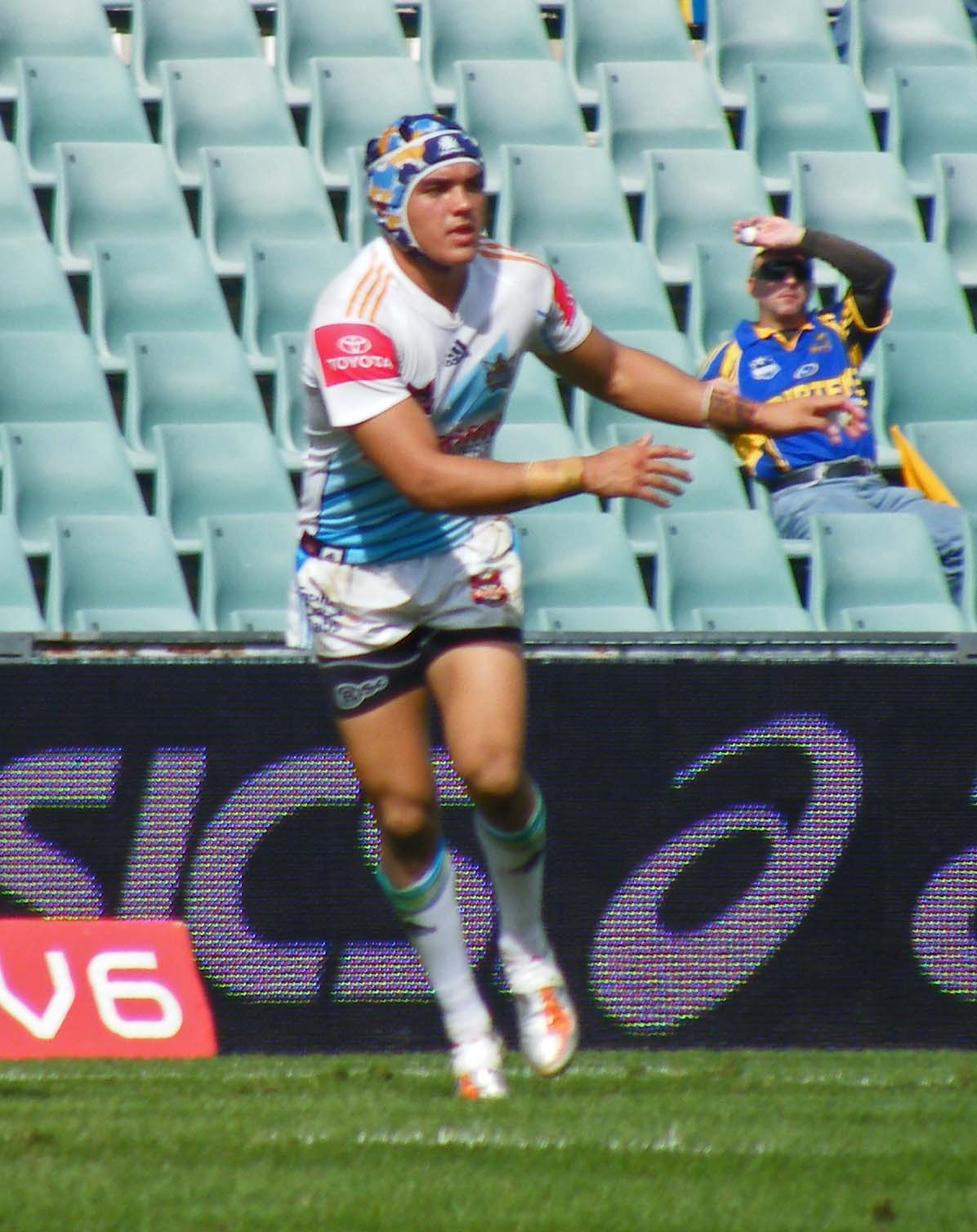
- Srama playing for the Titans in 2011.

Personal information
- Full name: Matthew Srama
- Born: 12 January 1991 (age 35) Brisbane, Queensland, Australia

Playing information
- Height: 178 cm (5 ft 10 in)
- Weight: 83 kg (13 st 1 lb)
- Position: Hooker
Club
| Years | Team | Pld | T | G | FG | P |
|---|---|---|---|---|---|---|
| 2011–16 | Gold Coast Titans | 65 | 7 | 0 | 0 | 28 |
Representative
| Years | Team | Pld | T | G | FG | P |
| 2012 | Philippines | 1 | 1 | 7 | 0 | 18 |

Matthew "Matt" Srama (born 12 January 1991) is an Australian former professional rugby league footballer who played for the Gold Coast Titans in the National Rugby League. A Philippines international representative, he played at hooker. Srama was educated at Forest Lake State High School.

== Background ==
Born in Brisbane, Queensland, Srama is of Filipino and Polish descent and played his junior football for the Centenary Panthers before being signed by the Gold Coast Titans. In 2010 and 2011, Srama played for the Titans' NYC team.

== Playing career ==
=== 2011 ===
On 12 May 2011, Srama re-signed with the Gold Coast on a three-year contract. In Round 12 of the 2011 NRL season, Srama made his NRL debut for the Gold Coast Titans against the Canterbury-Bankstown Bulldogs at hooker in the Titans 28–6 loss at Suncorp Stadium. In round 14 against the St George Illawarra Dragons, Srama scored his first NRL career try in the Titans 28–14 win at Jubilee Oval. Srama finished his debut year in the NRL with him playing in 14 matches and scoring a try for the Titans in the season filling in for the injured regular hooker Nathan Friend. Although the season saw Srama establish himself in first grade, the club struggled on the field and finished last on the table, claiming the wooden spoon.

=== 2012 ===
Due to Titans regular hooker Nathan Friend departure to the New Zealand Warriors, Srama took the void of playing at the position playing in 23 matches and scoring 4 tries for the Gold Coast Titans in the 2012 NRL season. On 21 October 2012, Srama played at five-eighth for the Philippines against Thailand, Srama scored a try and kicked 7 goals in their 86–0 win that saw the team crowned the inaugural Rugby League Asian Cup champions.

=== 2013 ===
Srama finished the 2013 NRL season with him playing in 19 matches and scoring 2 tries for the Gold Coast Titans as the club finished ninth and narrowly missed out on the finals.

=== 2014 ===
In June 2014, Srama re-signed with the Gold Coast on a two-year contract. Srama returned to the Titans first grade squad in Round 9 against the South Sydney Rabbitohs playing off the interchange bench in the Titans 40–18 loss at Cbus Super Stadium. Srama finished off the 2014 NRL season with him playing in 6 matches due to a hip injury that cut his year short for the Gold Coast Titans. In November 2014, Srama was told he was free to leave the Titans by head coach Neil Henry, as he would be overlooked for other players in the NRL side. On 20 November 2014, Srama signed a 1-year contract with the Sydney Roosters, before backflipping on the deal shortly afterwards due to money issues.

=== 2015 ===
Srama finished off the 2015 season having played in three matches for the Gold Coast, his season hampered by ankle and shoulder injuries as well as being played in the Queensland Cup for the Tweed Heads Seagulls.

=== 2016 ===
In February, Srama played for the Titans in the 2016 NRL Auckland Nines. On 13 January 2017, Srama announced on Facebook that he would retire from the NRL due to injury. He played 65 NRL games in six seasons for the Titans, for 7 tries.
