= Gordon Jones (footballer, born 1886) =

Welsh footballer (1886–1977)

Personal information
- Full name: Gordon Peace Jones
- Date of birth: 1886
- Place of birth: Talgarth, Wales
- Date of death: 1977
- Place of death: Llandrindod Wells, Wales
- Height: 5 ft 5 in (1.65 m)
- Position: Outside left

Youth career
- Builth Wells

Senior career*
Years	Team	Apps	(Gls)
1906–1907	Wrexham	31	(9)
1907–1908	Shrewsbury Town		

International career
1907	Wales	2	(0)
- * Club domestic league appearances and goals

Gordon Peace Jones (1886 – 1977) was a Welsh footballer who played as an outside left. He was part of the Wales national team, making two appearances. He made his debut on 23 February 1907 against Ireland and his last match on 4 March 1907 against Scotland.

He was the brother of fellow Wales international Albert Jones.

== See also ==
- List of Wales international footballers (alphabetical)
