= Leva Li =

Australian rugby league footballer

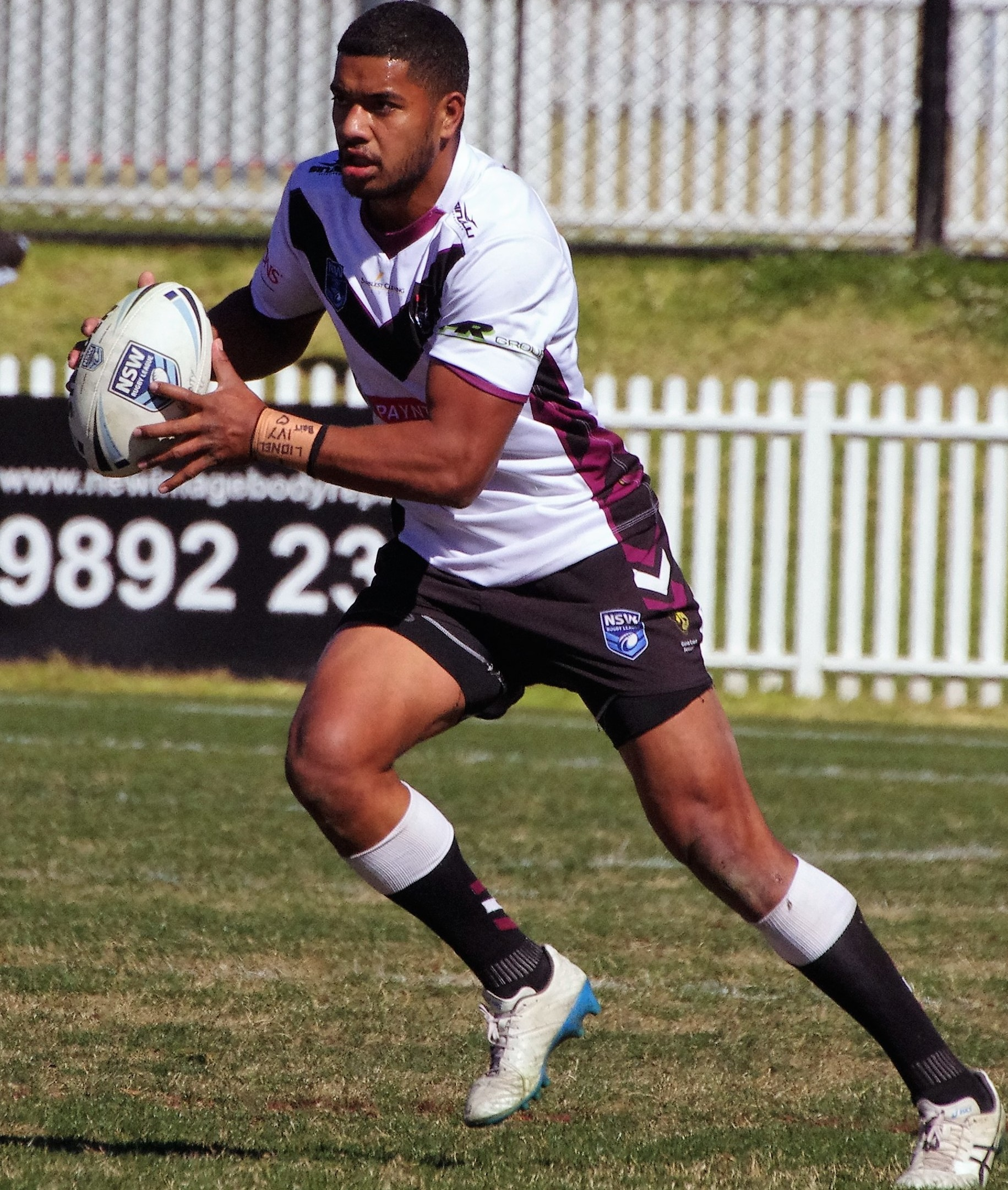

Personal information
- Born: 26 November 1994 (age 30); Sydney, New South Wales, Australia
- Height: 190 cm (6 ft 3 in)
- Weight: 101 kg (15 st 13 lb)

Playing information
- Position: Centre, Wing
Club
Years	Team	Pld	T	G	FG	P
2015	Gold Coast Titans	1	0	0	0	0
- Source: As of 16 August 2015

Leva Li (born 26 November 1994) is an Australian professional rugby league footballer who played for the Gold Coast Titans in the National Rugby League. He plays at centre and wing.

== Playing career ==
=== Early career ===
In 2013, Li played for the Wests Tigers' NYC team. In 2014, he joined the Parramatta Eels and played for their NYC team and Ron Massey Cup team, Guildford Owls.

=== 2015 ===
In 2015, Li trialed in the pre-season with Queensland Cup team Tweed Heads Seagulls, before the Gold Coast Titans signed him on a 1-year contract. In Round 23, he made his NRL debut for the Titans against the Canterbury-Bankstown Bulldogs.

=== 2016 ===
Li spent the entire 2016 season contracted to the Titans, playing for their Intrust Super Cup feeder team, the Tweed Heads Seagulls. Li was not re-signed at the end of the season

=== 2017 ===
Prior to the start of the 2017 season, Li signed with St. Mary's in the Ron Massey Cup
