= Ben Ridge =

Australian rugby league footballer

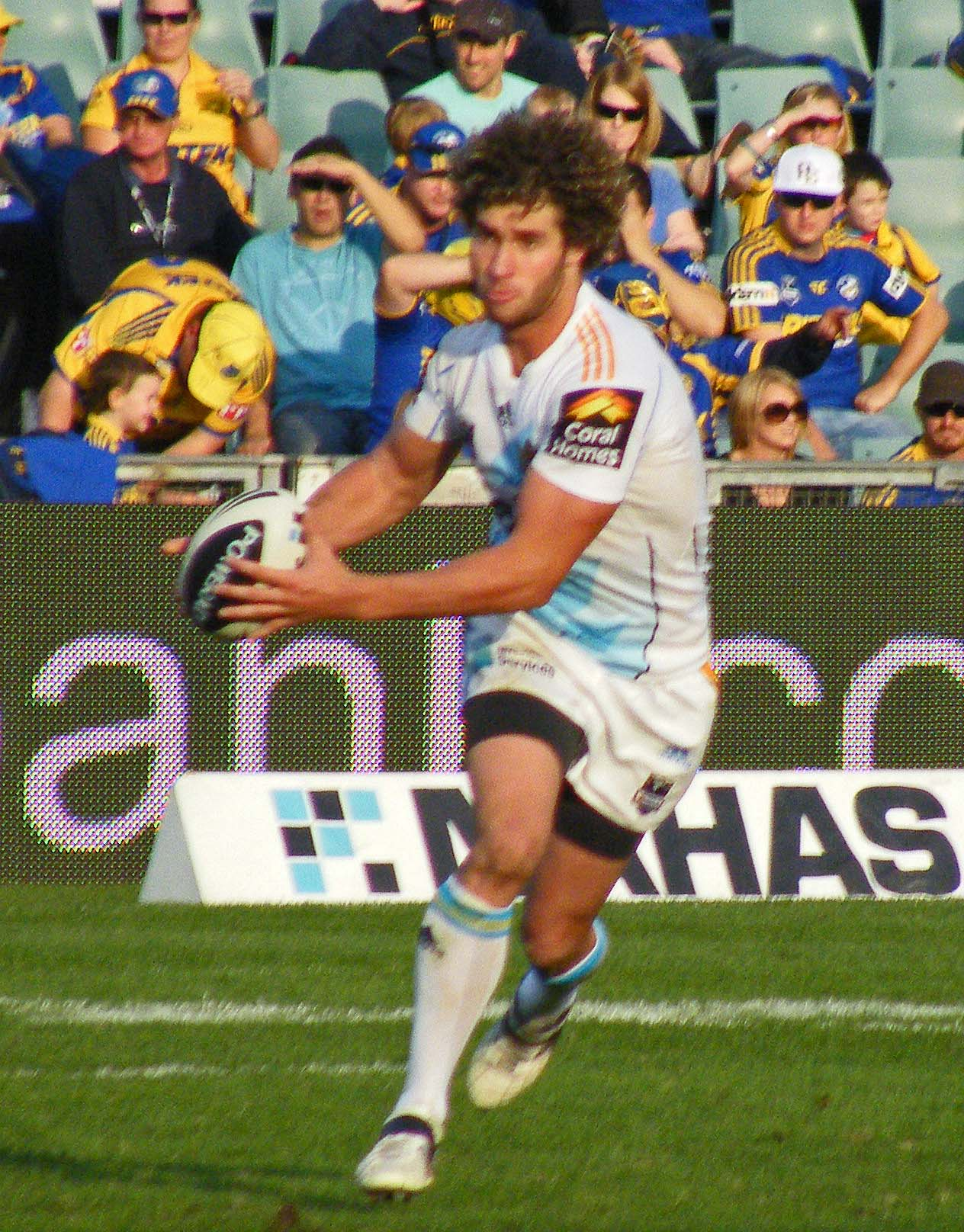
- Ridge playing for the Titans in 2011.

Personal information
- Born: 13 December 1989 (age 35); Toowoomba, Queensland, Australia

Playing information
- Height: 186 cm (6 ft 1 in)
- Weight: 102 kg (16 st 1 lb)
- Position: Second-row, Lock
Club
Years	Team	Pld	T	G	FG	P
2010–15	Gold Coast Titans	58	1	0	0	4
- Source: Rugby League Project

Ben Ridge (born 13 December 1989) is an Australian former professional rugby league footballer. He played at second-row and lock and played for the Gold Coast Titans in the National Rugby League.

== Background ==
Born in Toowoomba, Queensland, Ridge moved to Roma, Queensland at a young age and played his junior rugby league for the Mitchell Magpies. He was then signed by the Gold Coast Titans.

== Playing career ==
=== Early career ===
In late 2007, Ridge played for the Australian Schoolboys. In 2008 and 2009, he played for the Gold Coast Titans' NYC team, before moving on to the Titans' Queensland Cup team, Tweed Heads Seagulls in 2010.

=== 2010 ===
In Round 20 of the 2010 NRL season, Ridge made his NRL debut for the Titans against the St. George Illawarra Dragons. He made 4 appearances in total for the season, all victories for the Titans.

=== 2012 ===
On 11 July, Ridge extended his contract with the Titans from the end of 2013 to the end of 2015.

=== 2015 ===
On 19 August, Ridge announced his retirement from rugby league effective immediately, after a long stint of injuries that kept him out of the game.
