= Matt Robinson (rugby league) =

New Zealand rugby league footballer

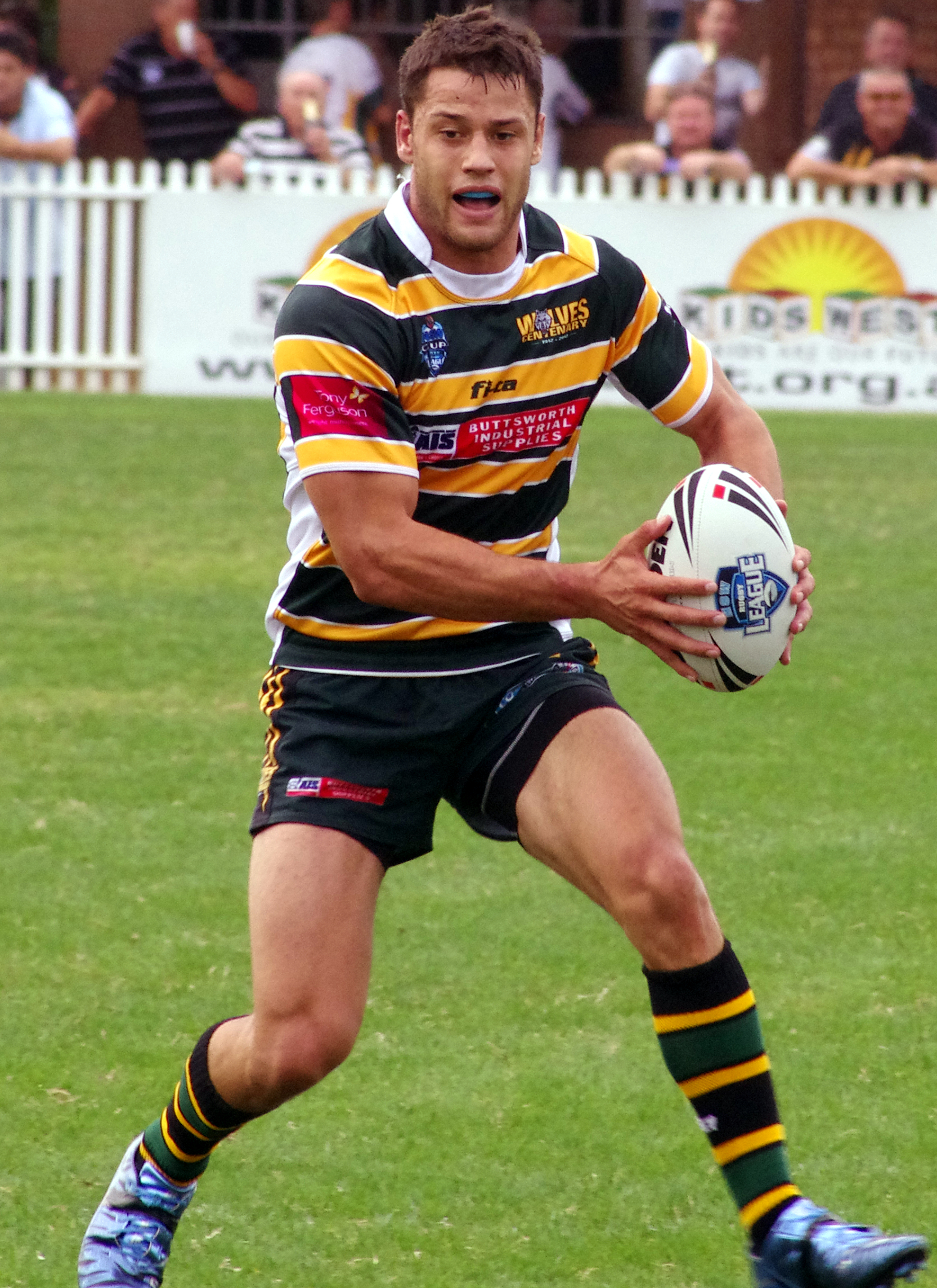

Personal information
- Born: 9 March 1990 (age 36) Wellington, New Zealand
- Height: 190 cm (6 ft 3 in)
- Weight: 103 kg (16 st 3 lb)

Playing information
- Position: Second-row, Lock
Club
Years	Team	Pld	T	G	FG	P
2012–14	Penrith Panthers	32	4	0	0	16
2015–16	Gold Coast Titans	6	0	0	0	0
2016–17	Limoux Grizzlies	18	9	0	0	36
	Total	56	13	0	0	52
- Source: As of 10 December 2017

Matt Robinson (born 9 March 1990) is a New Zealand rugby league footballer who plays for the Burleigh Bears in the Intrust Super Cup.

== Playing career ==
A Porirua Vikings junior, of maori heritage, Robinson joined the New Zealand Warriors in 2009 and played 40 games for the Junior Warriors in the Toyota Cup between 2009 and 2010, scoring three tries. He played for the Auckland Vulcans in 2011 before leaving to join the Penrith Panthers.

Robinson made his National Rugby League debut for the Panthers in round 7 of the 2012 season, against the Wests Tigers. Robinson then spent two seasons with the Gold Coast Titans, where he played in six matches. In August 2016, the Limoux Grizzlies announced the signing of Robinson.
