= Pindara Private Hospital =

- Ramsay Health Care

Geography
- Location: Allchurch Avenue, Benowa, Gold Coast, Queensland, Australia
- Coordinates: 28.006658°S 153.393652°E

Organisation
- Type: Community hospital

Services
- Emergency department: Yes
- Beds: 348

Helipads
- Helipad: No

History
- Founded: 1971

Links
- Website: www.pindaraprivate.com.au
- Lists: Hospitals in Australia

Pindara Private Hospital (or simply known as Pindara), is an acute medical, surgical and maternity hospital servicing the northern end of the Gold Coast. Pindara is the largest private hospital in the city, with 348 licensed beds, 17 operating theatres and a 24-hour emergency/ cardiac centre.

== Facility services ==
- 24-hour Emergency and Cardiac Centre
- Cardiac and Coronary care
- Obstetrics, Gynecology and IVF
- Pediatrics
- Ear Nose and Throat (ENT), Orthopedic, Breast, Obesity, Colorectal, Plastic and vascular surgery
- Neurosurgery and Neuro intervention
- Respiratory medicine supported by a lung function laboratory
- Gastroenterology supported by a dedicated Endoscopy unit
- Urology
- Gynecology
- General Medicine
- Day Oncology
- Renal Dialysis unit
- Chronic Pain unit
- Rehabilitation unit
- Day Procedure

== History ==
=== Early history ===
Built by Allen and Gwen Ramsay, Pindara Private Hospital opened to the public in 1971 offering 50 beds and three operating theatres. In 1987 the first private emergency department in Australia was established. During the 1990s the hospital underwent numerous expansions and renovations. A 47-bed wing, catering for maternity and surgical needs was established in 1995 and in 1998 the Pindara Day Procedure Centre was opened.

=== 2000s–present ===
2004 saw a cardiac lap opened and a sixth operating theatre. The upgrade/ refurbishment of the East Wing in 2007 added an extra 80 beds to the hospital. In 2009 stage one of a major redevelopment commenced adding; a 50-bed ward, four additional operating theatres, a suit of specialists' rooms and a new multi-storey car park. In 2014 stage two of the redevelopment was opened, officially being named the Dr David Lindsay Wing. The new five-storey wing features; five new wards – two new 29 surgical wards, a 24-bed neurosciences unit and a 29-bed oncology unit bring the total number of beds to 348. Two new operating theatres and kitchen facilities were also included in the new wing. In 2015 the rehabilitation unit, renal unit and chronic pain unit also opened.
