= Arthur Hughes (Welsh footballer) =

Welsh footballer

Personal information
- Date of birth: July 1884
- Place of birth: Wales
- Date of death: 1970 (aged 85–86)

Senior career*
Years	Team	Apps	(Gls)
- Chirk

International career
1907	Wales	1	(0)
- * Club domestic league appearances and goals

Arthur Hughes (July 1884 – 1970) was a Welsh international footballer. He was part of the Wales national football team, playing one match on 23 February 1907 against Ireland. At club level, he played for Chirk.

== See also ==
- List of Wales international footballers (alphabetical)
