= Harold Sloan =

Irish footballer (1882–1917)

Personal information
- Born: 25 August 1882; Ireland
- Died: 21 January 1917 (aged 34)
- Occupation: Football player
- Height: 5 ft 9 1/2 in (1.77 m)

Sport
- Country: Ireland (1882–1950)
- Sport: Association football
- Position: Forward
- League: Irish Football League; Leinster Senior League
- Club: Bohemian FC

Harold Alexander De Barbizon Sloan (25 August 1882 – 21 January 1917) was an Irish soccer player at the beginning of the 20th century.

Sloan represented Bohemians during his career in the Irish League. A forward, he was one of the main stars in the early Bohemian history. He scored the very first goal ever at Dalymount Park in a 4–2 win over Shelbourne on 7 September 1901.

He won eight full international caps for Ireland and once scored a hat-trick for them against Wales in a 4–4 draw in April 1906.

Sloan served as a second lieutenant in the Royal Garrison Artillery in the British Army and was killed in action during World War I on 21 January 1917. He is buried at the Guards Cemetery at Combles.

== Honours ==
Bohemians

- Leinster League: 1899–1900, 1900–01, 1901–02
