= Jamie Dowling =

Australian rugby league footballer

Personal information
- Born: 29 October 1990 (age 34); Kogarah, New South Wales, Australia
- Height: 185 cm (6 ft 1 in)
- Weight: 93 kg (14 st 9 lb)

Playing information
- Position: Centre, Fullback
Club
Years	Team	Pld	T	G	FG	P
2012–13	Gold Coast Titans	10	1	0	0	4
- Source: Rugby League Project, As of 30 October 2023

Jamie Dowling (born 29 October 1990) is an Australian professional rugby league footballer for the Burleigh Bears of the Intrust Super Cup. He is the grandson of former St. George Dragons and Queensland hooker, John Dowling.

== Early career ==
Born in Sydney but raised on the Gold Coast, Dowling began playing rugby league for Brighton Seagulls in Sydney before moving to the Burleigh Bears under 10's. Dowling continued playing for the Bears through his teenage years where he was a part of the Parramatta Eels development squad from 2005 to 2007.

== Gold Coast ==
A graduate of Marymount College, Dowling played for the Gold Coast Titans SG Ball side in 2008, before joining their National Youth Competition team for 2009. During his two years in the Toyota Cup, Dowling played 39 games, scored 6 tries and helped the Titans to the finals in 2010.

In 2011, Dowling re-joined his junior club, Burleigh, and cemented a spot in their Queensland Cup side at fullback. He was one of the Bears most consistent players in 2011, and was rewarded with a spot in the Titans full-time training squad for 2012.

Dowling made his first grade debut at fullback, in the Titans round 14 loss to the Cronulla-Sutherland Sharks.

== Burleigh ==
Between 2015 and 2018, Dowling played for Queensland Cup side Burleigh making 69 appearances. On 29 September 2016, Dowling was sentenced to 200 hours of community service and fined $500 after pleading guilty to possessing and supplying cocaine. The charges dated back to 2014.
