= James Roberts (footballer, born 1878) =

Welsh footballer

Personal information
- Date of birth: 1878
- Place of birth: Wales

Senior career*
Years	Team	Apps	(Gls)
1905–1908	Bradford City	24	(0)

International career
1906–1907	Wales	2	(0)
- * Club domestic league appearances and goals

James Roberts (born 1878) was a Welsh footballer who played at both professional and international levels.

== Career ==
Roberts played for Bradford City between 1905 and 1908, making 24 appearances in the English Football League; he was also Bradford's first international player.

Roberts earned international caps for Wales, earning two caps in 1906 and 1907.
