= Kane Elgey =

Australian rugby league footballer

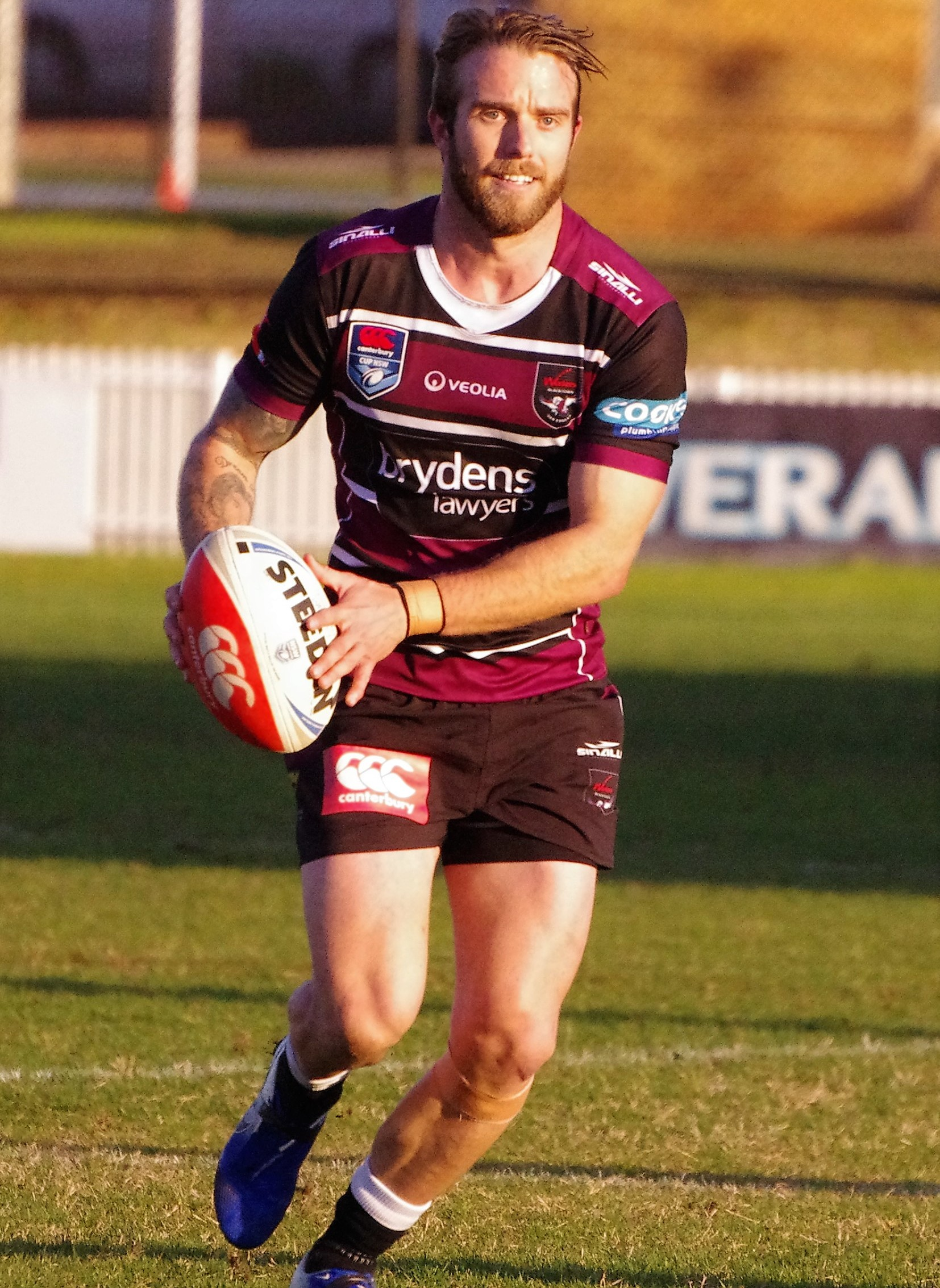

Personal information
- Born: 14 January 1994 (age 32) Gold Coast, Queensland, Australia
- Height: 180 cm (5 ft 11 in)
- Weight: 88 kg (13 st 12 lb)

Playing information
- Position: Halfback, Five-eighth
Club
| Years | Team | Pld | T | G | FG | P |
|---|---|---|---|---|---|---|
| 2015–18 | Gold Coast Titans | 46 | 15 | 19 | 0 | 98 |
| 2019 | Manly Sea Eagles | 12 | 1 | 0 | 0 | 4 |
| | Total | 58 | 16 | 19 | 0 | 102 |
Representative
| Years | Team | Pld | T | G | FG | P |
| 2015 | Prime Minister's XIII | 1 | 0 | 0 | 0 | 0 |
- Source: As of 10 August 2019

Kane Elgey (born 14 January 1994), also known by the nickname of "LG", is an Australian former professional rugby league footballer who last played as a halfback for the Gold Coast Titans and the Manly-Warringah Sea Eagles in the NRL. Elgey played for the Prime Minister's XIII in 2015.

== Background ==
Elgey was born on the Gold Coast, Queensland, Australia.

He played his junior rugby league for the Tugun Seahawks, before being signed by the Gold Coast Titans.

== Playing career ==
=== Early career ===
In October 2011, Elgey played for the Australian Schoolboys. From 2012 to 2014, he played for the Gold Coast Titans' NYC team, captaining the side in 2014. Elgey was named on the interchange bench in the 2014 NYC Team of the Year, but then awarded the NYC Player of the Year, despite his team coming 15th (second last). On 12 September 2014, he re-signed with the Titans on a 1-year contract.

=== Playing career ===
In 2015, Elgey started the year in the Titans' Queensland Cup team, the Tweed Heads Seagulls. In Round 4, he made his NRL debut for the Titans against the Cronulla-Sutherland Sharks, playing at halfback in the Titans' 24–22 win at Remondis Stadium. He then re-signed with the Titans on a 2-year contract. In Round 8 against the New Zealand Warriors, he scored his first and second NRL career tries in the Titans' 32–28 win at Mt Smart Stadium. He finished his debut year in the NRL having played in 16 matches, scoring 6 tries and kicking 10 goals for the Titans, and was named their Rookie of the Year. On 26 September, he played for the Prime Minister's XIII against Papua New Guinea, playing at halfback in his team's 40–12 win in Port Moresby.

On 5 January 2016, Elgey suffered a season-ending anterior cruciate ligament (ACL) knee injury at the Titans' first training session of the season. on 14 March, he extended his contract with the Titans to the end of 2018.

In August 2018, Elgey signed a two-year deal to join the Manly-Warringah Sea Eagles for the 2019 NRL season.

On 24 September 2019, Elgey announced his retirement from rugby league via his Instagram page. In his post Elgey wrote "I just know deep down I don't love it like I used to and when you lose that it's very hard to keep doing it at a high level".

== Post playing ==
In 2021, Elgey returned to the Titans as part of pathway systems for junior players.

== Statistics ==
| Year | Team | Games | Tries | Goals | Pts |
|---|---|---|---|---|---|
| 2015 | Gold Coast Titans | 16 | 6 | 10 | 44 |
| 2017 | Gold Coast Titans | 19 | 7 | 8 | 44 |
| 2018 | Gold Coast Titans | 11 | 2 | 1 | 10 |
| 2019 | Manly Warringah Sea Eagles | 12 | 1 | | 4 |
| | Totals | 58 | 16 | 19 | 102 |
