= James Roberts (rugby league) =

Australian professional rugby league footballer

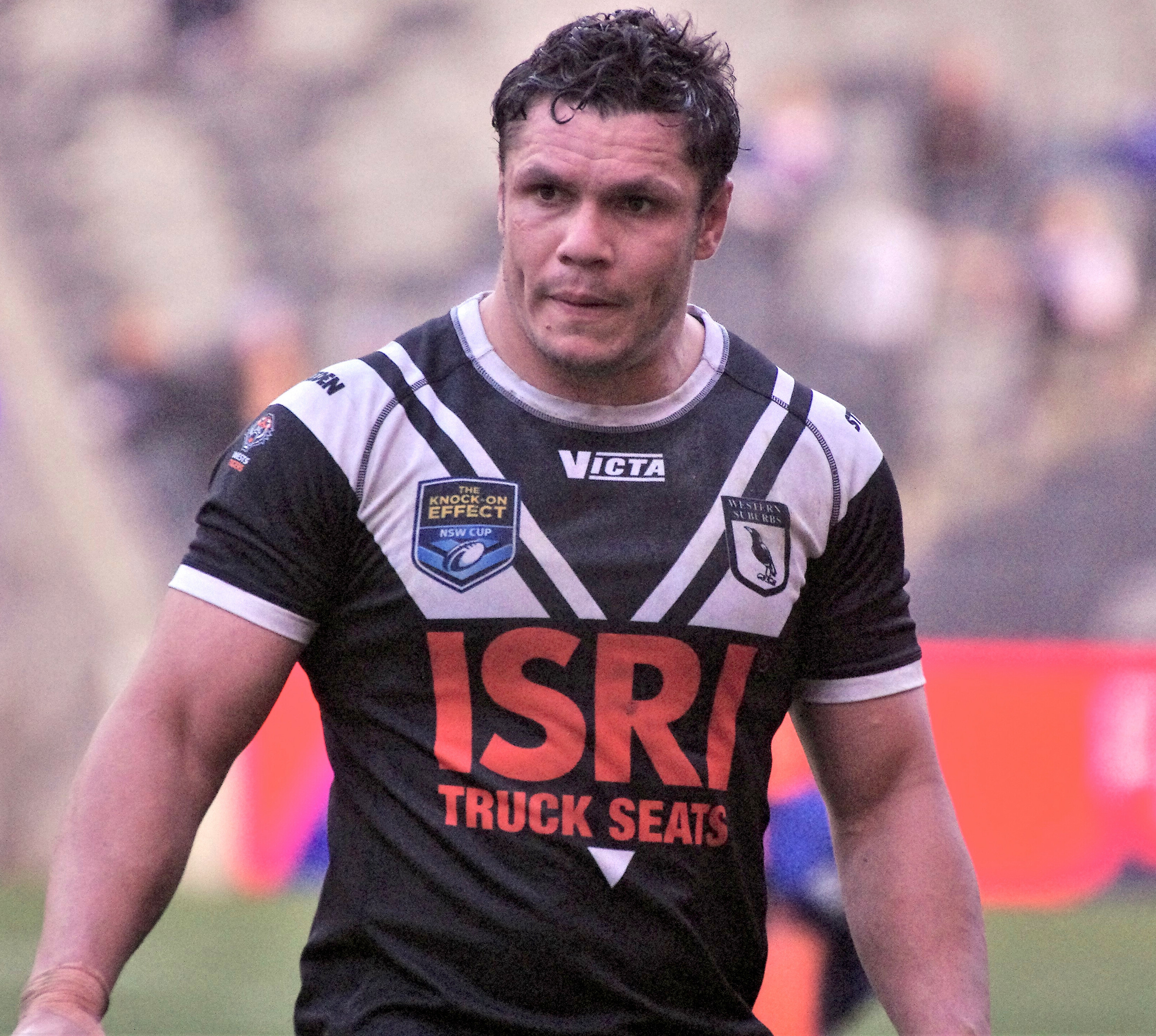

Personal information
- Full name: James Nathanial Roberts
- Born: 3 March 1993 (age 33) Kempsey, New South Wales, Australia

Playing information
- Height: 183 cm (6 ft 0 in)
- Weight: 90 kg (14 st 2 lb)
- Position: Centre, Wing
Club
Years	Team	Pld	T	G	FG	P
2011	South Sydney	10	5	0	0	20
2013	Penrith Panthers	6	6	0	0	24
2014–15	Gold Coast Titans	36	21	1	0	86
2016–19	Brisbane Broncos	81	41	0	0	164
2019–20	South Sydney	18	2	0	0	8
2021–22	Wests Tigers	17	3	0	0	12
	Total	168	78	1	0	314
Representative
Years	Team	Pld	T	G	FG	P
2015	City Origin	1	0	0	0	0
2016–19	Indigenous All Stars	3	1	0	0	4
2018	New South Wales	3	0	0	0	0
- Relatives: Amos Roberts (uncle); Tyrone Roberts (cousin); Tyronne Roberts-Davis (cousin); Albert Kelly (cousin); Brian Kelly (cousin); Anthony Mundine (cousin); Greg Inglis (cousin)

James Roberts (born 3 March 1993) is an Australian former professional rugby league footballer who last played as a centre for the Wests Tigers in the National Rugby League (NRL).

Roberts had previously played for the South Sydney Rabbitohs in two separate spells, as well as the Penrith Panthers, Gold Coast Titans and the Brisbane Broncos in the NRL. He has also played at representative level for the Indigenous All Stars, City Origin and in the 2018 State of Origin series for New South Wales.

== Background ==
Roberts was born in Kempsey, New South Wales, Australia and is of Indigenous Australian descent - from Bundjalung people. He is nicknamed "Jimmy the Jet".

Roberts is the nephew of former player Amos Roberts, the cousin of Gold Coast Titans players Tyrone Roberts, Tyrone Roberts-Davis and Brisbane Broncos player Albert Kelly, Anthony Mundine and former South Sydney Rabbitohs player/captain Greg Inglis.

== Early career ==
Roberts played junior rugby league for the Ballina Seagulls before signing with the South Sydney Rabbitohs.

He played in the Holden Cup from 2010 to 2013 with both South Sydney Rabbitohs and the Penrith Panthers, scoring 35 tries and kicking 17 goals in 32 games for 174 points in his U20s career.

On 3 October 2010, Roberts played on the wing in the 2010 NYC Grand Final for the South Sydney Rabbitohs against the New Zealand Warriors and scored a try in the 42-28 loss.

== Playing career ==
=== 2011 ===
In Round 7 of the 2011 NRL season, Roberts made his NRL debut for the South Sydney Rabbitohs against the Canterbury-Bankstown Bulldogs at fullback in the 36-24 loss at ANZ Stadium. In Round 8, his first NRL career try was in the Rabbitohs 31-12 win against the Cronulla-Sutherland Sharks at ANZ Stadium. Roberts finished the season with 10 matches and 5 tries, and was named on the wing in the 2011 NYC Team of the Year.

=== 2012 ===
Roberts did not make any NRL appearances during the 2012 season. However, he did play four games for Souths' feeder club side North Sydney Bears in the NSW Cup. On 25 July, Roberts was immediately released by the Rabbitohs after breaches of his playing contract. On 10 August, he signed a two-year contract with the Penrith Panthers commencing in 2013.

=== 2013 ===
In Round 11 of the 2013 NRL season, Roberts made his club debut for Penrith Panthers off the interchange bench in their 19-10 win against St. George Illawarra Dragons at Jubilee Oval. In Round 16 against the Dragons, he scored his first club try for Penrith in their 25-10 win at Penrith Stadium. In Round 17 against the Gold Coast Titans, Roberts scored a hat-trick of tries in a man of the match display in a 40-18 win at TIO Stadium in Darwin. On 6 October, Roberts also participated in the 2013 Holden Cup Grand Final against the New Zealand Warriors, contributing two tries to the 42-30 win. He subsequently won the Jack Gibson Medal, awarded to the Man of the Match. Roberts played six matches and scored six tries for Penrith in the 2013 NRL season.

=== 2014 ===
On 14 March, Roberts was released from the Panthers for off-field misbehaviour and later was "thrown a lifeline" when he was signed by the Gold Coast Titans for the 2014 NRL season on 31 March 2014. In Round 14, he made his club debut for the Titans against the Melbourne Storm at centre and scored a try in the 24-20 loss at Cbus Super Stadium. Roberts finished off his first season at the Titans with 5 tries 12 matches. On 30 October, he was investigated by the NRL after he was arrested for public nuisance in Surfers Paradise.

=== 2015 ===
Roberts was named in the Titans 2015 NRL Auckland Nines squad.

On 3 May, he played for New South Wales City against New South Wales Country at centre in the 34-22 loss.

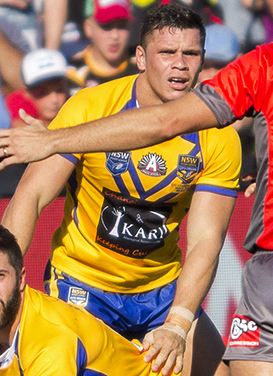
Roberts in 2015 City vs Country Origin match

At the 2015 Dally M Awards, Roberts was named the Centre of the Year. On 5 June, it was announced that Roberts had re-signed with the Titans on a three-year contract, however it was later discovered that his manager had forged his signature onto the contract, making it null and void. This subsequently lead to Roberts requesting a release from the club. Roberts finished off the season as the Titans leading try-scorer with 16 tries in 24 matches. On 23 December, he signed a 2-year contract with the Brisbane Broncos starting from 2016.

=== 2016 ===
Roberts was named in the emerging New South Wales Blues squad. On 13 February, he played for the Indigenous All Stars against the World All Stars, playing at centre in the 12-8 loss at Suncorp Stadium. In Round 1 of the season, Roberts (who was celebrating his 23rd birthday) made his club debut for the Brisbane Broncos against the Parramatta Eels, playing at centre in the 17-4 win at Parramatta Stadium. In Round 4 against the North Queensland Cowboys in the Grand Final rematch, Roberts scored his first club try for the Brisbane Broncos in the 21-20 golden point extra time win at Suncorp Stadium.

On 17 August, Roberts was again in trouble over another drunken incident after he allegedly abused a female bartender at the Normanby Hotel. When he was asked to leave by security, he was reportedly acting aggressive towards them and they were forced to put him in a "sleep hold" to restrain him until he was unconscious. An ambulance was called but Roberts regained consciousness and allegedly went to another pub to continue drinking for the rest of the night. Roberts received a $20,000 fine from the NRL but escaped suspension, instead being ordered to undergo a wellbeing plan which included community service on his days off for his public nuisance charge. In the Week 1 Elimination Finals match against the Gold Coast Titans, Roberts was placed on report for kicking Ryan Simpkins when he got up from a tackle. Roberts was later found guilty of the contrary conduct charge and was suspended for the do-or-die Week 2 Semi Finals match against the North Queensland Cowboys which the Broncos lost 26-20 in golden point extra time, ending their season. Roberts finished the year with 9 tries in 25 matches. On 30 September, it was reported that Roberts was visiting Thailand with a close family friend and had checked himself into a rehabilitation facility in order to help him overcome multifaceted personal issues, including a battle with alcohol. His manager and uncle stated 'I'm grateful for the support the Broncos have given James, and that everyone at the club cares about him as a person'.

=== 2017 ===
In January 2017, Roberts allegedly pulled a woman's hair at a Gold Coast Night club and was issued with a drunk diversion notice by police. However, the case was later dismissed. In February, Roberts was selected in the Broncos 2017 NRL Auckland Nines squad. In Round 7, Roberts scored a hat trick of tries for Brisbane in their 24 - 22 win against his former club, the Titans, at Suncorp Stadium. On 27 July 2017, Roberts extended his contract with the Broncos to the end of the 2021 season. In Round 26 against the North Queensland Cowboys, Roberts played his 100th NRL career match, scoring a try in the 20-10 victory at 1300SMILES Stadium. Roberts finished the 2017 NRL season as the Broncos highest tryscorer with 18 tries in 26 matches.

=== 2018 ===
During the off-season, Roberts reportedly spent time in a Thailand rehabilitation facility to deal with alcohol and substance abuse. Apparently, he was at the same facility in 2016. After showing good form in the early rounds, Roberts was selected in the New South Wales team for the 2018 State of Origin series. On 6 June 2018, Roberts made his State of Origin debut in Game 1, in which NSW defeated Queensland 22-12 at Melbourne Cricket Ground. Roberts played in all three matches at centre in the Blues 2-1 shield winning series. Roberts finished the 2018 NRL season having played 22 matches and scoring 9 tries for the Broncos.

=== 2019 ===
On 15 February 2019, Roberts represented the Indigenous All Stars as a centre in their 34 - 14 win against the New Zealand Maori All Stars team at AAMI Park.

On 29 May 2019, the Brisbane Broncos announced that Roberts had been granted an immediate release on compassionate grounds. Roberts then signed a contract with the South Sydney Rabbitohs until the end of the 2021 season. This brought him back under the coaching instruction of Wayne Bennett. Bennett had been head coach of the Broncos throughout Roberts’ three full seasons at that club prior to switching to South Sydney in 2019.

On 7 June 2019, Roberts played for South Sydney against the Newcastle Knights in round 13 at ANZ Stadium. South Sydney lost 20-12, however Roberts scored a try in the 8th minute.

In round 23, Souths defeated Brisbane Broncos by 22 - 20. In the 13th minute, Roberts was put on report and sinbinned for elbowing the head of former teammate Corey Oates. He was suspended for two games, then returned to play in the qualifying final against arch rival the Sydney Roosters.

On 27 September 2019, Roberts missed out on playing in Souths' elimination final loss against Canberra Raiders due to a dislocated thumb suffered the weekend previous when Souths defeated Manly-Warringah Sea Eagles.

=== 2020 ===
In round 10 of the 2020 NRL season, Roberts suffered a right pectoral injury in South Sydney's defeat against Newcastle. He was later ruled out for twelve weeks with the injury. On 19 November, Roberts signed a two-year deal with the Wests Tigers.

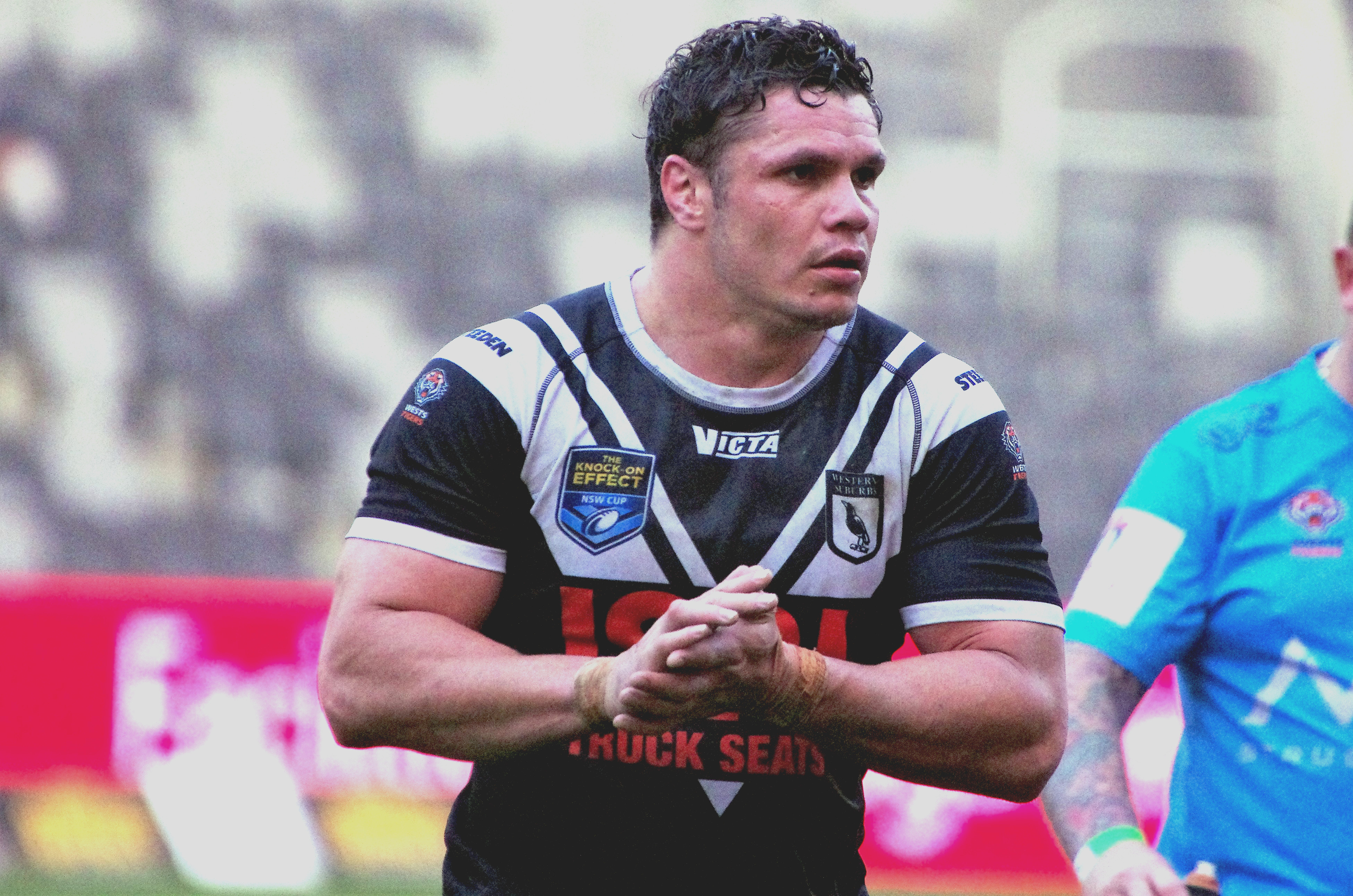
Roberts playing for the Western Suburbs Magpies in 2022

=== 2021 ===
In round 1 of the 2021 NRL season, he made his debut for Wests Tigers in a 30-12 loss against Canberra.

In round 12, Roberts scored two tries in a 34-18 victory over St. George Illawarra.

On 28 July, Roberts was fined $7500 and banned for one match after failing to comply with a Queensland Public Health directive. Roberts breached the biosecurity restrictions in place for players in South-East Queensland by going onto the balcony of his hotel room on the Gold Coast. Roberts played a total of 11 games for the Wests Tigers in the 2021 NRL season as the club finished 13th and missed the finals.

=== 2022 ===
In March, a Newcastle fan reportedly spotted Roberts and a Wests Tigers team-mate playing poker machines in a Newcastle hotel at 10pm on the eve of an unsuccessful Tigers match against Newcastle. The drama was described as "blown out of proportion". No NRL or club disciplinary action was taken as no integrity rules were breached.

== Personal life ==
On 11 October 2023, Roberts was captured on video punching the door of a police van after being led away from a Sydney courthouse. Roberts attended Downing Centre Local Court where he was due to face a mention for an apprehended domestic violence order. It was alleged that Roberts had an outburst in court before he was led out of the building by police. Roberts then punched the door of the police van and screamed "see what you do to me?".

On 7 November 2024, Roberts was allegedly charged with prohibited drug possession and possession of unlawfully obtained goods, it was said that the offences had actually occurred in June 2024 but samples had to be sent away for testing.
