= Wales national football team records and statistics =

This page details Wales national football team records; the most capped players, the players with the most goals, Wales's match record by opponent and decade.

== Player records ==
Players in bold are still active with Wales.

=== Most capped players ===
As of 17 November 2026

Rank	Player	Clubs^{[nb1]}	Wales career	Caps	Goals
1	Gareth Bale	Southampton, Tottenham Hotspur, Real Madrid, Los Angeles FC	2006–2022	111	41
2	Chris Gunter	Cardiff City, Tottenham Hotspur, Nottingham Forest, Reading, Charlton Athletic	2007–2022	109	0
=	Wayne Hennessey	Wolverhampton Wanderers, Crystal Palace, Burnley, Nottingham Forest	2007–2023	109	0
4	**Ben Davies**	Swansea City, Tottenham Hotspur	2012–	106	3
5	Neville Southall	Everton, Port Vale	1982–1998	92	0
6	Ashley Williams	Stockport County, Swansea City, Everton	2008–2019	86	2
=	Aaron Ramsey	Arsenal, Juventus, Rangers, Nice, Cardiff City	2008–2024	86	21
8	Gary Speed	Leeds United, Everton, Newcastle United, Bolton Wanderers	1990–2004	85	7
9	Craig Bellamy	Norwich City, Coventry City, Newcastle United, Blackburn Rovers, Liverpool, West Ham United, Manchester City, Cardiff City	1998–2013	78	19
10	Joe Ledley	Cardiff City, Celtic, Crystal Palace, Derby County	2006–2018	77	4
=	Joe Allen	Swansea City, Liverpool, Stoke City	2009–2025	77	2
12	Dean Saunders	Oxford United, Derby County, Liverpool, Aston Villa, Galatasaray, Nottingham Forest, Sheffield United, Benfica, Bradford City	1986–2001	75	22
13	Peter Nicholas	Crystal Palace, Arsenal, Luton Town, Aberdeen, Chelsea	1979–1991	73	2
=	Ian Rush	Liverpool, Juventus	1980–1996	73	28
15	Mark Hughes	Manchester United, Barcelona, Bayern Munich, Chelsea, Southampton	1984–1999	72	16
=	Joey Jones	Liverpool, Wrexham, Chelsea, Huddersfield Town	1975–1986	72	1

=== Top goalscorers ===
As of 17 November 2026

Rank	Player	Wales career	Caps	Goals	Average
1	Gareth Bale (list)	2006–2022	111	41	0.37
2	Ian Rush (list)	1980–1996	73	28	0.38
3	Trevor Ford	1947–1957	38	23	0.61
=	Ivor Allchurch	1951–1966	68	23	0.34
5	Dean Saunders	1986–2001	75	22	0.29
6	Aaron Ramsey	2008–2024	86	21	0.24
7	Craig Bellamy	1998–2013	78	19	0.24
8	**Harry Wilson**	2013–	71	17	0.24
9	Robert Earnshaw	2002–2012	58	16	0.28
=	Cliff Jones	1954–1969	59	16	0.27
=	Mark Hughes	1984–1999	72	16	0.22
12	John Charles	1950–1965	38	15	0.39
=	**Kieffer Moore**	2019–	57	15	0.26

=== Age records ===
- Youngest player to make debut: Harry Wilson – 16 years and 207 days
- Oldest player to play a game: Billy Meredith – 45 years and 229 days
- Youngest player to play at World Cup finals: Rubin Colwill – 20 years and 216 days
- Oldest player to play at World Cup finals: Wayne Hennessey – 35 years and 305 days

=== Other ===
- Longest serving player: Billy Meredith – 25 years (1895–1920)

== Games and results ==
Firsts

- First International: 26 March 1876 vs Scotland
- First home international: 5 March 1877 vs Scotland
- First win: 26 February 1881 vs England
- First overseas opponent: France, 25 May 1933
- First win over an overseas opponent: 23 November 1949 vs Belgium

Biggest

- Biggest Win: 11–0 vs Ireland, 3 March 1888
- Biggest Loss: 0–9 vs Scotland, 23 March 1878

Longest

- Longest winning streak: 6, 2 June 1980 – 16 May 1981
- Longest losing streak: 5, 25 March 1876 – 27 March 1880

== Goals ==
- First Welsh goal: William Davies, 18 January 1879 vs England
- Youngest player to score: Gareth Bale – 17 years and 83 days, 7 October 2006 v Slovakia
- Most goals scored in one game by a player: 4
  - John Price, 12 Feb 1882 vs Ireland
  - Jack Doughty, 3 Mar 1888 vs Ireland
  - Mel Charles, 11 Apr 1962 vs Northern Ireland
  - Ian Edwards, 25 October 1978 vs Malta

=== Hat-tricks ===
- First hat-trick: John Price, 12 February 1882 vs Ireland

== International tournaments ==
=== FIFA World Cup ===
Qualification

- First match: 15 October 1949 vs England
- First goal: Mal Griffiths vs England, 15 October 1949

Finals

- First finals: Sweden 1958
- Total number of times qualified for the finals: 2 (1958, 2022)
- First game: 8 June 1958 vs Hungary
- First goal: John Charles vs Hungary, 8 June 1958
- Most successful finals: 1958 – Quarter-finals
- World Cup top goalscorer: 2
  - Ivor Allchurch (1958)

=== UEFA European Championship ===
Finals

- First finals: France 2016
- Total number of times qualified for the finals: 2 (2016, 2020)
- First game: 11 June 2016 vs Slovakia
- First goal: Gareth Bale vs Slovakia, 11 June 2016
- Most successful finals: 2016 – Semi-finals
- European Championship top goalscorer: 3
  - Gareth Bale (2016)

== Rankings ==
- Highest FIFA Rank: 8 (October 2015)
- Lowest FIFA Rank: 117 (August 2011)
- Highest Elo Rank: 3 (1876–1885)
- Lowest Elo Rank: 75 (September 2000)

== Team records ==
=== Head to head ===
Opponent	Pld	W	D	L	GF	GA	W%
Albania	4	1	2	1	3	2	25
Andorra	2	2	0	0	4	1	100
Argentina	2	0	1	1	1	2	0
Armenia	4	0	3	1	5	7	0
Australia	1	0	0	1	1	2	0
Austria	11	4	2	5	11	13	36
Azerbaijan	8	7	1	0	15	2	88
Belarus	7	6	0	1	16	8	86
Belgium	19	5	5	9	29	32	26
Bosnia and Herzegovina	5	0	3	2	3	7	0
Brazil	10	1	1	8	5	20	10
Bulgaria	10	5	1	4	6	8	50
Canada	4	2	0	2	4	3	50
Chile	1	0	0	1	0	2	0
China	1	1	0	0	6	0	100
Costa Rica	2	1	0	1	1	1	50
Croatia	8	1	3	4	7	12	13
Cyprus	7	5	0	2	10	6	71
Czech Republic	6	1	4	1	5	5	17
Czechoslovakia	12	3	3	6	10	15	25
Denmark	13	4	0	9	9	19	31
East Germany	4	1	0	3	7	8	25
England	105	14	21	70	91	256	13
Estonia	4	3	1	0	4	1	75
Faroe Islands	2	2	0	0	9	0	100
Finland	16	7	5	4	25	14	44
France	6	1	1	4	4	14	17
Georgia	5	1	1	3	3	9	20
Germany	10	2	3	5	6	13	20
Ghana	1	0	1	0	1	1	0
Gibraltar	2	1	1	0	4	0	50
Greece	2	1	0	1	4	3	50
Hungary	12	6	2	4	17	15	50
Iceland	9	6	2	1	19	8	67
Iran	2	1	0	1	1	2	50
Ireland	62	29	12	21	139	102	47
Israel	6	3	3	0	10	3	50
Italy	10	2	0	8	5	24	20
Jamaica	1	0	1	0	0	0	0
Japan	1	1	0	0	1	0	100
Kazakhstan	2	2	0	0	4	1	100
Kuwait	2	0	2	0	0	0	0
Latvia	3	3	0	0	5	0	100
Liechtenstein	5	5	0	0	12	0	100
Luxembourg	6	6	0	0	17	2	100
Malta	4	4	0	0	15	2	100
Mexico	5	1	2	2	3	5	20
Moldova	4	3	0	1	9	3	75
Montenegro	5	3	0	2	6	5	60
Netherlands	10	0	0	10	8	29	0
New Zealand	1	0	1	0	2	2	0
North Macedonia	4	2	1	1	10	4	50
Northern Ireland	37	17	13	7	53	32	46
Norway	13	4	4	5	18	18	31
Panama	1	0	1	0	1	1	0
Paraguay	1	0	1	0	0	0	0
Poland	11	1	3	7	6	13	9
Portugal	6	1	0	5	6	13	17
Qatar	1	1	0	0	1	0	100
Republic of Ireland	19	8	5	6	19	18	42
Rest of the United Kingdom	2	1	0	1	3	3	50
Romania	6	1	1	4	8	11	17
Russia	5	1	1	3	5	6	20
San Marino	4	4	0	0	16	1	100
Saudi Arabia	1	1	0	0	2	1	100
Scotland	107	23	23	61	124	243	21
Serbia	6	0	2	4	5	15	0
Slovakia	6	3	1	2	10	13	50
Slovenia	1	0	1	0	0	0	0
South Korea	1	0	1	0	0	0	0
Soviet Union	5	1	2	2	3	6	20
Spain	6	1	2	3	7	11	17
Sweden	7	0	1	6	3	16	0
Switzerland	8	2	1	5	7	17	25
Trinidad and Tobago	2	2	0	0	3	1	100
Tunisia	1	0	0	1	0	4	0
Turkey	11	4	4	3	13	10	36
Ukraine	4	1	2	1	3	3	25
Uruguay	2	0	1	1	0	1	0
United States	3	0	2	1	1	3	0
Yugoslavia	7	0	3	4	10	18	0
West Germany	7	0	3	4	4	13	0
Totals	737	235	167	335	923	1,184	32

P – Played; W – Won; D – Drawn; L – Lost
Statistics include official FIFA recognised matches only
Up to date as of 17 November 2026

=== By decade ===
Decade	Pld	W	D	L	GF	GA	GD	W%
1870s	5	0	0	5	1	20	−19	0
1880s	28	8	3	17	60	82	−22	29
1890s	30	3	5	22	43	112	−69	10
1900s	30	8	8	14	37	60	−23	27
1910s	15	3	3	9	15	23	−8	20
1920s	32	9	10	13	42	61	−19	28
1930s	30	13	5	12	54	60	−6	43
1940s	15	5	0	10	20	31	−11	33
1950s	49	14	14	21	66	91	−25	29
1960s	54	12	9	33	74	108	−34	22
1970s	65	20	18	27	60	77	−17	31
1980s	68	24	19	25	80	72	+8	35
1990s	67	24	10	33	79	109	−30	36
2000s	89	32	23	34	101	97	+4	36
2010s	85	34	16	35	95	96	−1	40
2020s	77	27	25	25	95	92	+3	35
Overall	737	235	167	335	923	1,184	−261	32

P – Played, W – Won, D – Drawn, L – Lost, GF – Goals For, GA – Goals Against, GD – Goal Difference
Statistics include official FIFA recognised matches only
Up to date as of 17 November 2026

== Notes ==
1. ^{nb1} Only clubs played for while receiving caps are listed.

== See also ==
- British Home Championship
