= Wales national football team results =

For lists of Wales national football team results see:

- Wales national football team results 1876–99
- Wales national football team results 1900–14
- Wales national football team results 1920–39
- Wales national football team results 1946–59
- Wales national football team results 1960–79
- Wales national football team results 1980–99
- Wales national football team results 2000–19
- Wales national football team results 2020–39
- Wales national football team results (unofficial matches)
