= List of international goals scored by Gareth Bale =

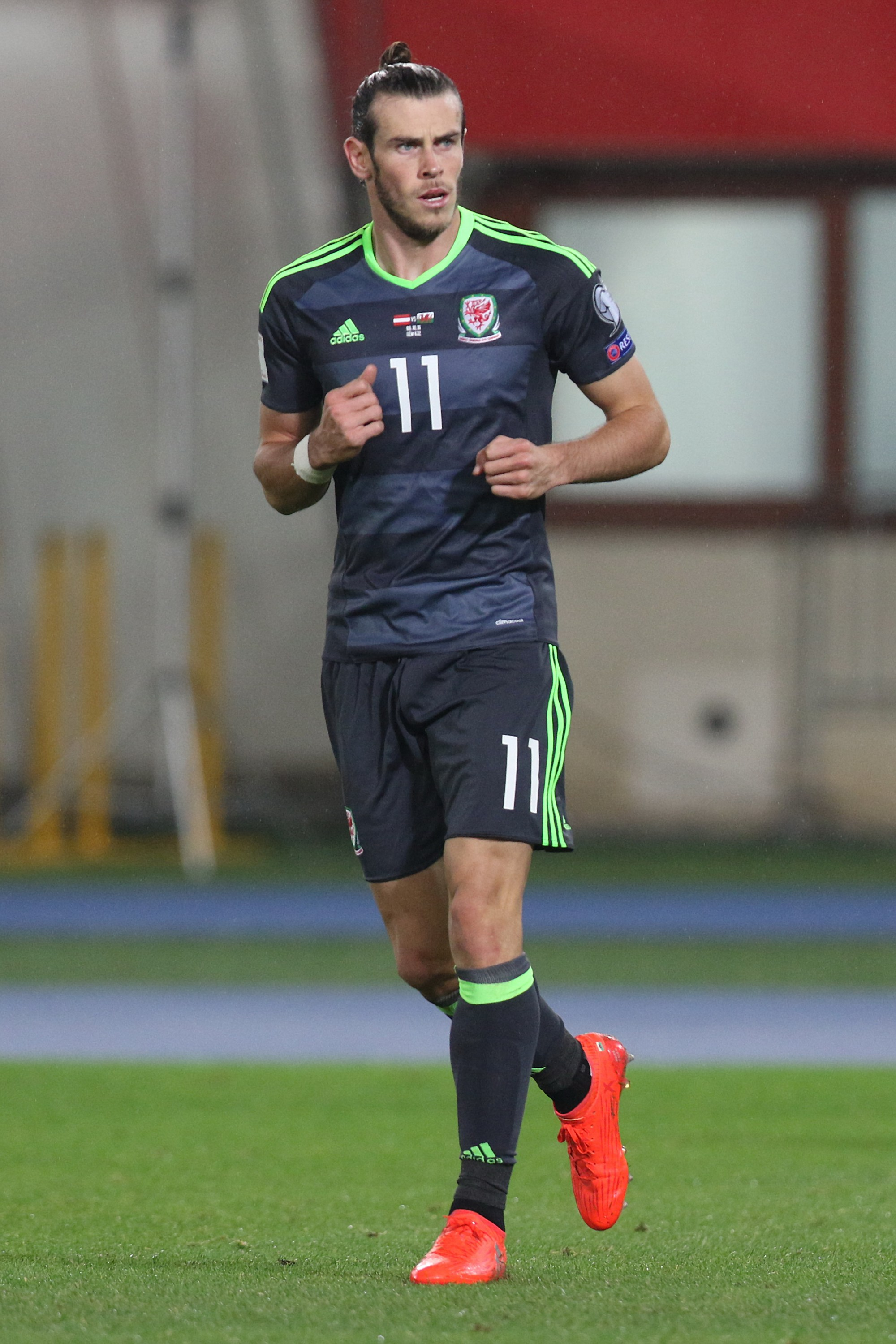
Bale playing for Wales in 2016

Gareth Bale is a Welsh former professional footballer who represented the Wales national team as a forward from 2006 to 2022. He made his debut appearance for Wales on 27 May 2006, during a friendly against Trinidad and Tobago; at 16 years and 315 days old, Bale was the youngest ever player to represent the side at the time. In October 2006, during his third appearance for Wales, he scored directly from a free kick in a 5–1 UEFA Euro 2008 qualifying defeat against Slovakia to become the nation's youngest ever goalscorer. With 41 goals in 111 appearances, is the country's all-time top goalscorer.

On 13 October 2015, Bale scored his nineteenth international goal in a 2–0 victory over Andorra during Wales' final qualifying match for UEFA Euro 2016, helping secure the nation's first appearance at a major international tournament since the 1958 FIFA World Cup. Bale was Wales' top scorer in their successful qualifying campaign, finishing with a tally of seven goals. During the final tournament in France, Bale scored in all three group matches at the tournament, against Slovakia, Russia, and England, as Wales topped their group and would go on to reach the semi-finals. Bale's opener from a free kick in his side's first group game against Slovakia was the first goal at a major international tournament by a Welsh player since Terry Medwin scored against Hungary in 1958. Bale became the Welsh national team's all-time top goalscorer on 22 March 2018, after scoring a hat-trick in a friendly against China at the China Cup. Bale entered the match on 26 goals, two short of fellow countryman Ian Rush's record tally, having not scored an international goal in eighteen months since November 2016. He scored twice in the first half of the game to equal Rush's record, before surpassing it with his third goal in the second half. He also became the first Welsh player to score a hat-trick at international level since Robert Earnshaw in 2004. He scored his second hat-trick in a fixture in September 2021, during a 3–2 victory over Belarus.

Bale played for Wales in the qualifying campaigns of every FIFA World Cup and European Championship from UEFA Euro 2008 to the 2022 World Cup, as well as in the finals of Euro 2016, where the side reached the last four before being knocked out by eventual champions Portugal. He also featured in the finals of Euro 2020, where Wales reached the round of 16, but Bale failed to score a goal. At the 2022 World Cup, he scored Wales' only goal of the tournament against the United States. Bale scored more times in qualifying matches than in any other format with 28 goals (14 in Euro qualifiers and 14 in World Cup qualifiers). His other goals included six in friendly matches (including three in the China Cup), three in the European Championship finals, three in the UEFA Nations League and one in the World Cup finals. He scored more times against China, Belarus, Andorra and Austria than any other opponent, with three goals each against the sides.

== Goals ==
Wales' score listed first, score column indicates score after each Bale goal.

International goals by date, venue, cap, opponent, score, result and competition
No.	Date	Venue	Cap	Opponent	Score	Result	Competition	Ref.
1	7 October 2006	Millennium Stadium, Cardiff, Wales	3	Slovakia	1–2	1–5	UEFA Euro 2008 qualification	
2	28 March 2007	Millennium Stadium, Cardiff, Wales	6	San Marino	2–0	3–0	UEFA Euro 2008 qualification	
3	12 October 2010	St. Jakob-Park, Basel, Switzerland	27	Switzerland	1–1	1–4	UEFA Euro 2012 qualification	
4	7 October 2011	Liberty Stadium, Swansea, Wales	31	Switzerland	2–0	2–0	UEFA Euro 2012 qualification	
5	11 October 2011	Vasil Levski National Stadium, Sofia, Bulgaria	32	Bulgaria	1–0	1–0	UEFA Euro 2012 qualification	
6	12 November 2011	Cardiff City Stadium, Cardiff, Wales	33	Norway	1–0	4–1	Friendly	
7	11 September 2012	Karađorđe Stadium, Novi Sad, Serbia	36	Serbia	1–2	1–6	2014 FIFA World Cup qualification	
8	12 October 2012	Cardiff City Stadium, Cardiff, Wales	37	Scotland	1–1	2–1	2014 FIFA World Cup qualification	
9	12 October 2012	Cardiff City Stadium, Cardiff, Wales	37	Scotland	2–1	2–1	2014 FIFA World Cup qualification	
10	6 February 2013	Liberty Stadium, Swansea, Wales	39	Austria	1–0	2–1	Friendly	
11	26 March 2013	Liberty Stadium, Swansea, Wales	41	Croatia	1–0	1–2	2014 FIFA World Cup qualification	
12	5 March 2014	Cardiff City Stadium, Cardiff, Wales	44	Iceland	3–1	3–1	Friendly	
13	9 September 2014	Estadi Nacional, Andorra la Vella, Andorra	45	Andorra	1–1	2–1	UEFA Euro 2016 qualification	
14	9 September 2014	Estadi Nacional, Andorra la Vella, Andorra	45	Andorra	2–1	2–1	UEFA Euro 2016 qualification	
15	28 March 2015	Sammy Ofer Stadium, Haifa, Israel	49	Israel	2–0	3–0	UEFA Euro 2016 qualification	
16	28 March 2015	Sammy Ofer Stadium, Haifa, Israel	49	Israel	3–0	3–0	UEFA Euro 2016 qualification	
17	12 June 2015	Cardiff City Stadium, Cardiff, Wales	50	Belgium	1–0	1–0	UEFA Euro 2016 qualification	
18	3 September 2015	GSP Stadium, Nicosia, Cyprus	51	Cyprus	1–0	1–0	UEFA Euro 2016 qualification	
19	13 October 2015	Cardiff City Stadium, Cardiff, Wales	54	Andorra	2–0	2–0	UEFA Euro 2016 qualification	
20	11 June 2016	Nouveau Stade de Bordeaux, Bordeaux, France	56	Slovakia	1–0	2–1	UEFA Euro 2016	
21	16 June 2016	Stade Bollaert-Delelis, Lens, France	57	England	1–0	1–2	UEFA Euro 2016	
22	20 June 2016	Stadium Municipal, Toulouse, France	58	Russia	3–0	3–0	UEFA Euro 2016	
23	5 September 2016	Cardiff City Stadium, Cardiff, Wales	62	Moldova	3–0	4–0	2018 FIFA World Cup qualification	
24	5 September 2016	Cardiff City Stadium, Cardiff, Wales	62	Moldova	4–0	4–0	2018 FIFA World Cup qualification	
25	9 October 2016	Cardiff City Stadium, Cardiff, Wales	64	Georgia	1–0	1–1	2018 FIFA World Cup qualification	
26	12 November 2016	Cardiff City Stadium, Cardiff, Wales	65	Serbia	1–0	1–1	2018 FIFA World Cup qualification	
27	22 March 2018	Guangxi Sports Center, Nanning, China	69	China	1–0	6–0	2018 China Cup	
28	22 March 2018	Guangxi Sports Center, Nanning, China	69	China	2–0	6–0	2018 China Cup	
29	22 March 2018	Guangxi Sports Center, Nanning, China	69	China	6–0	6–0	2018 China Cup	
30	6 September 2018	Cardiff City Stadium, Cardiff, Wales	71	Republic of Ireland	2–0	4–1	2018–19 UEFA Nations League B	
31	16 November 2018	Cardiff City Stadium, Cardiff, Wales	73	Denmark	1–2	1–2	2018–19 UEFA Nations League B	
32	6 September 2019	Cardiff City Stadium, Cardiff, Wales	78	Azerbaijan	2–1	2–1	UEFA Euro 2020 qualification	
33	13 October 2019	Cardiff City Stadium, Cardiff, Wales	81	Croatia	1–1	1–1	UEFA Euro 2020 qualification	
34	5 September 2021	Central Stadium, Kazan, Russia	98	Belarus	1–0	3–2	2022 FIFA World Cup qualification	
35	5 September 2021	Central Stadium, Kazan, Russia	98	Belarus	2–2	3–2	2022 FIFA World Cup qualification	
36	5 September 2021	Central Stadium, Kazan, Russia	98	Belarus	3–2	3–2	2022 FIFA World Cup qualification	
37	24 March 2022	Cardiff City Stadium, Cardiff, Wales	101	Austria	1–0	2–1	2022 FIFA World Cup qualification	
38	24 March 2022	Cardiff City Stadium, Cardiff, Wales	101	Austria	2–0	2–1	2022 FIFA World Cup qualification	
39 (Note: UEFA marked this as an own goal by Andriy Yarmolenko, but FIFA technical experts awarded the goal to Bale.)	5 June 2022	Cardiff City Stadium, Cardiff, Wales	103	Ukraine	1–0	1–0	2022 FIFA World Cup qualification	
40	14 June 2022	De Kuip, Rotterdam, Netherlands	106	Netherlands	2–2	2–3	2022–23 UEFA Nations League A	
41	21 November 2022	Ahmad bin Ali Stadium, Al Rayyan, Qatar	109	United States	1–1	1–1	2022 FIFA World Cup	

== Hat-tricks ==
No.	Opponent	Goals	Score	Venue	Competition	Date
1	China	3 – (1–0', 2–0', 6–0')	6–0	Guangxi Sports Center, Nanning, China	2018 China Cup	22 March 2018
2	Belarus	3 – (1–0', 2–2', 3–2')	3–2	Central Stadium, Kazan, Russia	2022 FIFA World Cup qualification	5 September 2021

== Statistics ==
Appearances and goals by year
Year	Apps	Goals
2006	4	1
2007	7	1
2008	5	0
2009	7	0
2010	4	1
2011	6	3
2012	5	3
2013	5	2
2014	5	3
2015	6	5
2016	11	7
2017	3	0
2018	6	5
2019	9	2
2020	4	0
2021	13	3
2022	11	5
Total	111	41

Goals by competition
Competition	Goals
FIFA World Cup	1
UEFA European Championship finals	3
UEFA European Championship qualifiers	14
FIFA World Cup qualifiers	14
UEFA Nations League	3
China Cup	3
Friendlies	3
Total	41

== See also ==
- List of international goals scored by Ian Rush
- List of top international men's association football goal scorers by country
