= Wales national football team results (1900–1914) =

The Wales national football team represents Wales in international association football and is governed by the Football Association of Wales (FAW). Between 1900 and 1914 the side played 45 matches, all against the other national teams of the Home Nations in the British Home Championship. Having struggled in the competition prior to 1900, the Welsh side started the 20th century with considerably more success. They recorded two second-place finishes and winning their first Championship in the 1906–07 tournament in which they won their opening two matches before drawing with England in their final fixture, while Wales' Lot Jones was the competition's top goalscorer.

This was followed, however by an immediate downturn as they finished bottom of the competition a year after their victory. A second-place finish in the 1908–09 championship was the highest-placed result Wales subsequently achieved during the time period. In March 1912, Wales played their 100th official international fixture, losing 1–0 against Scotland at Tynecastle Park. The decision was taken to halt the competition in December 1914 after the outbreak of World War I and Wales did not play another competitive fixture until February 1920. (Note: Wales played two fixtures against England in 1919 but these are considered unofficial matches.)

Of the 45 matches the team played between 1900 and 1914, they won 11, defeating Ireland 7 times and Scotland 4 times, including their first victory over the latter at the 30th attempt. In the remaining 34 fixtures, Wales drew 11 and lost 23. They failed to beat England in 15 attempts. The team's inconsistent performances were partly attributed to the reluctance of Football League sides to release Welsh players for international duty, with FAW secretary Ted Robbins being highly critical of both the league and its teams during the period.

== Results ==
Wales' score is shown first in each case. The colours listed below are also used to signify results combined with the scoreline.

Key
| Colour (with score) | Meaning |
|---|---|
| | Defeat |
| | Draw |
| | Win |

Wales national football team results 1900–1914 (Note: Table information sourced from the references listed in the statistics section below.)
| Match no. | Date | Venue | H/A | Opponents | Score | Competition | Wales scorers | Att. (Note: Due to the unavailability of exact figures, attendance numbers are given as recorded estimates.) |
|---|---|---|---|---|---|---|---|---|
| 64 | 3 February 1900 | Pittodrie, Aberdeen | A | Scotland | 2–5 | 1899–1900 British Home Championship | Tom Parry (2) | 12,500 |
| 65 | 24 February 1900 | The Oval, Llandudno | H | Ireland | 2–0 | 1899–1900 British Home Championship | Tom Parry, Billy Meredith | 6,000 |
| 66 | 26 March 1900 | Cardiff Arms Park, Cardiff | H | England | 1–1 | 1899–1900 British Home Championship | Billy Meredith | 20,000 |
| 67 | 2 March 1901 | Racecourse Ground, Wrexham | H | Scotland | 1–1 | 1900–01 British Home Championship | Tom Parry | 5,000 |
| 68 | 18 March 1901 | St James' Park, Newcastle | A | England | 0–6 | 1900–01 British Home Championship | | 11,000 |
| 69 | 23 March 1901 | Solitude, Belfast | A | Ireland | 1–0 | 1900–01 British Home Championship | Owen Jones | 7,000 |
| 70 | 22 February 1902 | Cardiff Arms Park, Cardiff | H | Ireland | 0–3 | 1901–02 British Home Championship | | 10,000 |
| 71 | 3 March 1902 | Racecourse Ground, Wrexham | H | England | 0–0 | 1901–02 British Home Championship | | 10,000 |
| 72 | 15 March 1902 | Cappielow, Glasgow | A | Scotland | 1–5 | 1901–02 British Home Championship | Hugh Morgan-Owen | 10,000 |
| 73 | 2 March 1903 | Fratton Park, Portsmouth | A | England | 1–2 | 1902–03 British Home Championship | Mart Watkins | 5,000 |
| 74 | 9 March 1903 | Cardiff Arms Park, Cardiff | H | Scotland | 0–1 | 1902–03 British Home Championship | | 11,000 |
| 75 | 28 March 1903 | Soltiude, Belfast | A | Ireland | 0–2 | 1902–03 British Home Championship | | 14,000 |
| 76 | 29 February 1904 | Racecourse Ground, Wrexham | H | England | 2–2 | 1903–04 British Home Championship | Mart Watkins, Lloyd Davies | 9,000 |
| 77 | 12 March 1904 | Dens Park, Dundee | A | Scotland | 1–1 | 1903–04 British Home Championship | Bobby Atherton | 9,000 |
| 78 | 21 March 1904 | Penrhyn Park, Bangor | H | Ireland | 0–2 | 1903–04 British Home Championship | | 6,000 |
| 79 | 6 March 1905 | Racecourse Ground, Wrexham | H | Scotland | 3–1 | 1904–05 British Home Championship | Mart Watkins, Grenville Morris, Billy Meredith | 6,000 |
| 80 | 27 March 1905 | Anfield, Liverpool | A | England | 1–3 | 1904–05 British Home Championship | Grenville Morris | 20,000 |
| 81 | 8 April 1905 | Solitude, Belfast | A | Ireland | 2–2 | 1904–05 British Home Championship | Mart Watkins, Bobby Atherton | 15,000 |
| 82 | 3 March 1906 | Tynecastle Park, Edinburgh | A | Scotland | 2–0 | 1905–06 British Home Championship | Lot Jones, John Love Jones | 25,000 |
| 83 | 19 March 1906 | Cardiff Arms Park, Cardiff | H | England | 0–1 | 1905–06 British Home Championship | | 25,000 |
| 84 | 2 April 1906 | Racecourse Ground, Wrexham | H | Ireland | 4–4 | 1905–06 British Home Championship | Arthur Green, Hugh Morgan-Owen | 5,000 |
| 85 | 23 February 1907 | Solitude, Belfast | A | Ireland | 3–2 | 1906–07 British Home Championship | Dickie Morris, Billy Meredith, Lot Jones | 12,000 |
| 86 | 4 March 1907 | Racecourse Ground, Wrexham | H | Scotland | 1–0 | 1906–07 British Home Championship | Grenville Morris | 7,715 |
| 87 | 18 March 1907 | Craven Cottage, London | A | England | 1–1 | 1906–07 British Home Championship | Lot Jones | 22,000 |
| 88 | 7 March 1908 | Dens Park, Dundee | A | Scotland | 1–2 | 1907–08 British Home Championship | Lot Jones | 18,000 |
| 89 | 16 March 1908 | Racecourse Ground, Wrexham | H | England | 1–7 | 1907–08 British Home Championship | William Davies | 7,000 |
| 90 | 11 April 1908 | Athletic Ground, Aberdare | H | Ireland | 0–1 | 1907–08 British Home Championship | | 6,000 |
| 91 | 1 March 1909 | Racecourse Ground, Wrexham | H | Scotland | 3–2 | 1908–09 British Home Championship | William Davies, Lot Jones | 6,000 |
| 92 | 15 March 1909 | City Ground, Nottingham | A | England | 0–2 | 1908–09 British Home Championship | | 11,500 |
| 93 | 15 March 1909 | Solitude, Belfast | A | Ireland | 3–2 | 1908–09 British Home Championship | Lot Jones, George Wynn, Billy Meredith | 10,000 |
| 94 | 5 March 1910 | Rugby Park, Kilmarnock | A | Scotland | 0–1 | 1909–10 British Home Championship | | 22,000 |
| 95 | 14 March 1910 | Cardiff Arms Park, Cardiff | H | England | 0–1 | 1909–10 British Home Championship | | 22,000 |
| 96 | 11 April 1910 | Racecourse Ground, Wrexham | H | Ireland | 4–1 | 1909–10 British Home Championship | Grenville Morris (2), Robert Evans (2) | 8,000 |
| 97 | 28 January 1911 | Windsor Park, Belfast | A | Ireland | 2–1 | 1910–11 British Home Championship | William Davies, Grenville Morris | 15,000 |
| 98 | 6 March 1911 | Ninian Park, Cardiff | H | Scotland | 2–2 | 1910–11 British Home Championship | Grenville Morris (2) | 14,500 |
| 99 | 13 March 1911 | The Den, London | A | England | 0–3 | 1910–11 British Home Championship | | 22,000 |
| 100 | 2 March 1912 | Tynecastle Stadium, Edinburgh | A | Scotland | 0–1 | 1911–12 British Home Championship | | 22,000 |
| 101 | 11 March 1912 | Racecourse Ground, Wrexham | H | England | 0–2 | 1911–12 British Home Championship | | 10,000 |
| 102 | 13 April 1912 | Ninian Park, Cardiff | H | Ireland | 2–3 | 1911–12 British Home Championship | William Davies, David Davies | 10,000 |
| 103 | 18 January 1913 | Grosvenor Park, Belfast | A | Ireland | 1–0 | 1912–13 British Home Championship | James Roberts | 8,000 |
| 104 | 3 March 1913 | Racecourse Ground, Wrexham | H | Scotland | 0–0 | 1912–13 British Home Championship | | 8,000 |
| 105 | 17 March 1913 | Ashton Gate Stadium, Bristol | A | England | 3–4 | 1912–13 British Home Championship | Walter Davies, Ernest Peake, Billy Meredith | 8,000 |
| 106 | 19 January 1914 | Racecourse Ground, Wrexham | H | Ireland | 1–2 | 1913–14 British Home Championship | Evan Jones | 5,000 |
| 107 | 28 February 1914 | Celtic Park, Glasgow | A | Scotland | 0–0 | 1913–14 British Home Championship | | 10,000 |
| 108 | 16 March 1914 | Ninian Park, Cardiff | H | England | 0–2 | 1913–14 British Home Championship | | 17,586 |

== Head to head records ==
Head to head records
| Opponent | P | W | D | L | GF | GA | W% | D% | L% |
|---|---|---|---|---|---|---|---|---|---|
| England | 15 | 0 | 4 | 11 | 12 | 35 | 0 | 26.67 | 73.33 |
| Ireland | 15 | 7 | 2 | 6 | 25 | 24 | 46.67 | 13.33 | 40 |
| Scotland | 15 | 4 | 5 | 6 | 17 | 22 | 26.67 | 33.33 | 40 |
| Totals | 45 | 11 | 11 | 23 | 54 | 81 | 24.44 | 24.44 | 51.11 |
