= William Davies (footballer, born 1882) =

Welsh footballer

Personal information
- Full name: William Davies
- Date of birth: 13 April 1882
- Place of birth: Wrexham, Wales
- Date of death: 21 January 1966 (aged 83)
- Place of death: Preston, England
- Position: Centre forward

Youth career
- Wrexham National School
- 1900: Wrexham St. Giles
- Wrexham Victoria

Senior career*
| Years | Team | Apps | (Gls) |
| 1902–1905 | Wrexham | | |
| 1905–1913 | Blackburn Rovers | 132 | (66) |

International career
| 1903–1912 | Wales | 11 | (5) |
- * Club domestic league appearances and goals

William Davies (13 April 1882 – 21 January 1966) was a Welsh footballer who played as a centre forward for Wrexham and Blackburn Rovers in the era prior to World War I as well as making eleven appearances for Wales.

== Early life ==
Davies was born in Wrexham and was trained as a tinsmith, thus earning the nickname "Tinker", which he was to retain for the rest of his life. He played football as an amateur with various clubs in the Wrexham area; whilst he was with Wrexham Victoria of the Chester and District League, he gained a reputation as a prolific goal-scorer.

== Football career ==
=== Wrexham ===
He was signed by Wrexham, then playing in The Combination, in 1902. Davies was described as a "short, dogged player, full of dash and determination", who had a reputation for charging the goalkeeper; in one Welsh Cup match, he bundled the goalkeeper into the net five times.

In his first season with Wrexham, he helped the club reach the final of the Welsh Cup, where they defeated Aberaman 8–0, with Davies being one of four players who scored twice. Two years later, Wrexham again won the cup, with Davies once more being on the score-sheet in a 3–0 victory over Aberdare Athletic.

Shortly before the 1903 Welsh Cup final, Davies was called up to represent Wales against Ireland at Solitude Ground, Belfast in the last Wales match in the 1903 British Home Championship – the match ended in a 2–0 victory for the Irish. His second match for Wales came two years later, in a 2–2 draw with the Irish.

=== Blackburn Rovers ===
In the summer of 1905, he was signed by Blackburn Rovers of the Football League First Division for a fee of £150. Davies had been keen to join Liverpool who were anxious to acquire his services, but his former Wrexham teammate, Bob Evans, who had joined Blackburn two years previously, persuaded him to join Rovers.

He made his debut for Blackburn in a reserves match in typical fashion, scoring a hat-trick; a local report said "Tinker got three goals and in two of them put the goalkeeper in as well".

In the 1906 edition of "Association Football and the Men Who Made It", Davies was described as "a snapper up of trifles (who) snatched at goals with greedy delight".

In November 1908, he scored four goals in two consecutive matches; the first occasion came at Goodison Park on 21 November when Everton were 4–1 up with twenty minutes left to play, when Davies' "whirlwind" scoring brought the scores level by full-time. He was Blackburn's top scorer in three of the eight seasons he spent at Ewood Park: 1907–08 (9 goals), 1908–09 (21 goals) and 1910–11 (16 goals).

Davies was recalled to the Welsh team for the 1908 British Home Championship; in the match against England on 16 March. Davies scored his first international goal, a consolation goal scored in the 90th minute of a 7–1 defeat. In this match, the Wales goalkeeper, Leigh Roose, left the field after being injured in the 15th minute following a shoulder-charge by Vivian Woodward; Charlie Morris took over in goal until half-time, when Dai Davies came on as a substitute 'keeper.

The following season, Davies scored twice in a 3–2 victory over Scotland; this was his first win for Wales.

Davies was seriously injured midway through the 1909–10 season causing him to miss the latter half of the season including the international matches, but he returned the following season and continued to be a regular member of the Blackburn team. During the 1911–12 season, he was now reaching the end of his career but still made eleven appearances, scoring twice, to help Blackburn win the Football League title for the first time.

== Retirement and later life ==
Davies was married to the daughter of a director of Blackburn FC. In 1910, with the proceeds of a benefit match, he went into partnership with his Blackburn teammate Bob Crompton as motor engineers. Davies retired from football in April 1913 to concentrate on his business.

During the First World War, he was stationed in Malta with the Mechanical Transport Corps.

== International appearances ==
Davies made a total of 11 appearances for Wales in international matches, scoring five goals, as follows:

| Date | Venue | Opponent | Result | Goals | Competition |
|---|---|---|---|---|---|
| 28 March 1903 | Solitude Ground, Belfast | Ireland | 0–2 | 0 | British Home Championship |
| 8 April 1905 | Solitude Ground, Belfast | Ireland | 2–2 | 0 | British Home Championship |
| 7 March 1908 | Dens Park, Dundee | Scotland | 1–2 | 0 | British Home Championship |
| 16 March 1908 | Racecourse Ground, Wrexham | England | 1–7 | 1 | British Home Championship |
| 1 March 1909 | Racecourse Ground, Wrexham | Scotland | 3–2 | 2 | British Home Championship |
| 15 March 1909 | City Ground, Nottingham | England | 0–2 | 0 | British Home Championship |
| 20 March 1909 | Solitude Ground, Belfast | Ireland | 3–2 | 0 | British Home Championship |
| 28 January 1911 | Windsor Park, Belfast | Ireland | 2–1 | 1 | British Home Championship |
| 6 March 1911 | Ninian Park, Cardiff | Scotland | 2–2 | 0 | British Home Championship |
| 13 March 1911 | The Den, London | England | 0–3 | 0 | British Home Championship |
| 13 April 1912 | Ninian Park, Cardiff | Ireland | 2–3 | 1 | British Home Championship |

== Honours ==
Wrexham

- Welsh Cup winners: 1903, 1905

Blackburn Rovers

- Football League champions: 1911–12
