= List of international goals scored by Ian Rush =

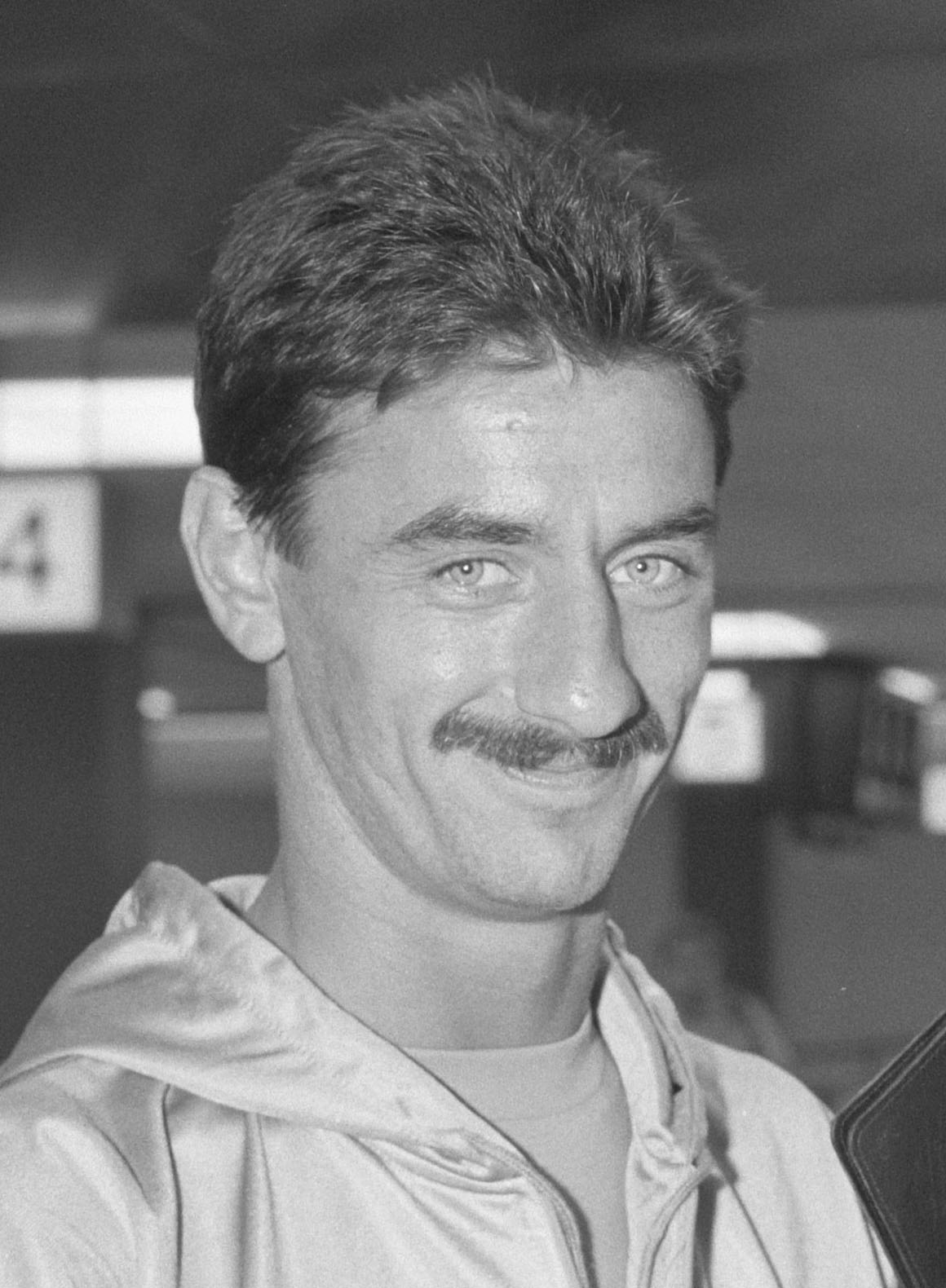
Ian Rush prior to a 1990 World Cup qualifier against the Netherlands in Amsterdam

Ian Rush is a Welsh former professional footballer who represented the Wales national football team from 1980 to 1996, scoring 28 international goals in 73 appearances. He made his debut on 21 May 1980, in a 1–0 defeat against Scotland in the British Home Championship. Rush scored his first international goal two years later in a 3–0 home game victory against Northern Ireland.

In his 55th match, a 6–0 win over the Faroe Islands on 9 September 1992, Rush scored his 23rd international goal and the only hat-trick of his career. This drew him level with the top scorers of Wales: Trevor Ford and Ivor Allchurch. Ford had scored 23 goals in 38 matches between 1947 and 1957, and Allchurch had scored the same number in 68 matches between 1951 and 1966. Rush became the Wales national team's all-time top goalscorer on 31 March 1993, when he broke the record with a goal against Belgium.

Rush scored four more goals in his Wales career to extend the record to 28 goals. He held it until 2018, when Gareth Bale scored his 29th international goal against China. Rush's tally included a goal that saw Wales beat then-world champions Germany in 1991 by a score of 1–0. He retired from international football in 1996, making his final appearance for Wales in a 3–0 defeat to Italy on 24 January. During his international career, Wales failed to progress further than the qualifying stage of any major tournament.

== Goals ==
Scores and results list Wales' goal tally first.

Rush's goals against international opponents
| No. | Date | Venue | Cap | Opponent | Score | Result | Competition | Ref. |
|---|---|---|---|---|---|---|---|---|
| 1 | 27 May 1982 | Racecourse Ground, Wrexham | 8 | Northern Ireland | 3–0 | 3–0 | 1982 British Home Championship | |
| 2 | 2 June 1982 | Stadium Municipal, Toulouse | 9 | France | 1–0 | 1–0 | Friendly | |
| 3 | 22 September 1982 | Vetch Field, Swansea | 10 | Norway | 1–0 | 1–0 | Euro 1984 qualifier | |
| 4 | 15 December 1982 | Stadion Pod Goricom, Titograd | 11 | Yugoslavia | 2–3 | 4–4 | Euro 1984 qualifier | |
| 5 | 23 February 1983 | Wembley Stadium, London | 12 | England | 1–0 | 1–2 | 1983 British Home Championship | |
| 6 | 12 October 1983 | Racecourse Ground, Wrexham | 15 | Romania | 1–0 | 5–0 | Friendly | |
| 7 | 12 October 1983 | Racecourse Ground, Wrexham | 15 | Romania | 3–0 | 5–0 | Friendly | |
| 8 | 26 February 1985 | Racecourse Ground, Wrexham | 22 | Norway | 1–1 | 1–1 | Friendly | |
| 9 | 27 March 1985 | Hampden Park, Glasgow | 23 | Scotland | 1–0 | 1–0 | 1986 World Cup qualifier | |
| 10 | 30 April 1985 | Racecourse Ground, Wrexham | 24 | Spain | 1–0 | 3–0 | 1986 World Cup qualifier | |
| 11 | 30 April 1985 | Racecourse Ground, Wrexham | 24 | Spain | 3–0 | 3–0 | 1986 World Cup qualifier | |
| 12 | 26 March 1986 | Lansdowne Road, Dublin | 27 | Republic of Ireland | 1–0 | 1–0 | Friendly | |
| 13 | 1 April 1987 | Racecourse Ground, Wrexham | 31 | Finland | 1–0 | 4–0 | Euro 1988 qualifier | |
| 14 | 29 April 1987 | Racecourse Ground, Wrexham | 32 | Czechoslovakia | 1–1 | 1–1 | Euro 1988 qualifier | |
| 15 | 1 June 1988 | Ta' Qali National Stadium, Valletta | 37 | Malta | 3–2 | 3–2 | Friendly | |
| 16 | 4 June 1988 | Stadio Mario Rigamonti, Brescia | 38 | Italy | 1–0 | 1–0 | Friendly | |
| 17 | 17 October 1990 | Cardiff Arms Park, Cardiff | 46 | Belgium | 1–1 | 3–1 | Euro 1992 qualifier | |
| 18 | 14 November 1990 | Stade Josy Barthel, Luxembourg | 47 | Luxembourg | 1–0 | 1–0 | Euro 1992 qualifier | |
| 19 | 5 June 1991 | Cardiff Arms Park, Cardiff | 51 | Germany | 1–0 | 1–0 | Euro 1992 qualifier | |
| 20 | 20 May 1992 | Stadionul Național, Bucharest | 54 | Romania | 1–5 | 1–5 | 1994 World Cup qualifier | |
| 21 | 9 September 1992 | Cardiff Arms Park, Cardiff | 55 | Faroe Islands | 1–0 | 6–0 | 1994 World Cup qualifier | |
| 22 | 9 September 1992 | Cardiff Arms Park, Cardiff | 55 | Faroe Islands | 4–0 | 6–0 | 1994 World Cup qualifier | |
| 23 | 9 September 1992 | Cardiff Arms Park, Cardiff | 55 | Faroe Islands | 6–0 | 6–0 | 1994 World Cup qualifier | |
| 24 | 31 March 1993 | Cardiff Arms Park, Cardiff | 58 | Belgium | 2–0 | 2–0 | 1994 World Cup qualifier | |
| 25 | 6 June 1993 | Svangaskarð, Toftir | 60 | Faroe Islands | 3–0 | 3–0 | 1994 World Cup qualifier | |
| 26 | 8 September 1993 | Cardiff Arms Park, Cardiff | 61 | RCS | 2–1 | 2–2 | 1994 World Cup qualifier | |
| 27 | 13 October 1993 | Cardiff Arms Park, Cardiff | 62 | Cyprus | 2–0 | 2–0 | 1994 World Cup qualifier | |
| 28 | 23 May 1994 | Kadrioru Stadium, Tallinn | 66 | Estonia | 1–0 | 2–1 | Friendly | |

== Statistics ==
Caps and goals by year
| Year | Caps | Goals |
|---|---|---|
| 1980 | 2 | 0 |
| 1981 | 3 | 0 |
| 1982 | 6 | 4 |
| 1983 | 6 | 3 |
| 1984 | 4 | 0 |
| 1985 | 4 | 4 |
| 1986 | 4 | 1 |
| 1987 | 5 | 2 |
| 1988 | 6 | 2 |
| 1989 | 3 | 0 |
| 1990 | 4 | 2 |
| 1991 | 6 | 1 |
| 1992 | 4 | 4 |
| 1993 | 6 | 4 |
| 1994 | 6 | 1 |
| 1995 | 3 | 0 |
| 1996 | 1 | 0 |
| Total | 73 | 28 |

Caps and goals by competition
| Competition | Caps | Goals |
|---|---|---|
| Friendlies | 20 | 8 |
| British Home Championships | 10 | 2 |
| World Cup qualifiers | 20 | 11 |
| UEFA European Championship qualifiers | 23 | 7 |
| Total | 73 | 28 |

== See also ==
- List of international goals scored by Gareth Bale
- Wales national football team records and statistics

== Work cited ==
- Rush, Ian (2008). Rush: The Autobiography. Ebury Press. ISBN 978-0-09-192805-6.
