= 1904–05 British Home Championship =

Tournament details
- Host country: England, Ireland, Scotland and Wales
- Dates: 25 February – 8 April 1905
- Teams: 4

Final positions
- Champions: England (13th title)
- Runners-up: Wales

Tournament statistics
- Matches played: 6
- Goals scored: 19 (3.17 per match)
- Top scorer(s): (Wales) Grenville Morris (Scotland) Charlie Thomson (Wales) Mart Watkins (England) Vivian Woodward (2 goals)

The 1904–05 British Home Championship was an international football tournament between the British Home Nations. It took place in the second half of the 1904–05 football season and saw England win the championship for the third time in a row with two victories and a draw. Wales, despite losing to England, came in second as part of a strong run which would result in victory at the 1907 British Home Championship. Scotland and Ireland came joint third with two points a piece.

England and Ireland kicked off the competition in February 1905 with a hard fought 1–1 draw in Middlesbrough. In early March, Wales and Scotland began their tournaments with Wales easily beating the Scots in Wrexham and taking the top of the table. Scotland responded to the defeat with a 4–0 rout of the Irish in their second game, and England then moved to the head of the table with a 3–1 victory over the Welsh at home. England then beat Scotland in London to make them winners unless Wales could win against Ireland in Belfast. In the culminating match the Welsh played hard and scored twice, but it was not enough to secure victory and the championship went to England.

== Table ==
Team	Pld	W	D	L	GF	GA	GD	Pts
England (C)	3	2	1	0	5	2	+3	5
Wales	3	1	1	1	6	6	0	3
Scotland	3	1	0	2	5	4	+1	2
Ireland	3	0	2	1	3	7	−4	2

Rules for classification: 1) points. The points system worked as follows: 2 points for a win and 1 point for a draw.
(C) Champions

== Results ==
25 February 1905

England	1–1	Ireland
Bloomer 50'		Williamson 49' (o.g.)

Ayresome Park, Middlesbrough
Attendance: 21,700
Referee: Tom Robertson (Scotland)

6 March 1905

Wales	3–1	Scotland
Watkins 30'; Morris 47'; Meredith 50'		Robertson 86'

Racecourse Ground, Wrexham
Attendance: 6,000
Referee: Frederick Thomas Kirkham (England)

18 March 1905

Scotland	4–0	Ireland
Thomson 14' (pen.), 61' (pen.); Walker 35'; Quinn 50'

Celtic Park, Glasgow
Attendance: 35,000
Referee: Frederick Thomas Kirkham (England)

27 March 1905

England	3–1	Wales
Woodward 55', 88'; Harris 80'		Morris 75'

Anfield, Liverpool
Attendance: 26,100
Referee: Tom Robertson (Scotland)

1 April 1905

England	1–0	Scotland
Bache 80'

The Crystal Palace, London
Attendance: 32,000
Referee: William Nunnerley (Wales)

8 April 1905

Ireland	2–2	Wales
Murphy 25'; O'Hagan 45'		Watkins 10'; Atherton 38'

Solitude, Belfast
Attendance: 15,000
Referee: Fred Kirkham (England)

== Winning squad ==
- England

Name	Apps/Goals by opponent			Total	
Name	(Wales) WAL	(Ireland) IRE	(Scotland) SCO	Apps	Goals
Vivian Woodward	1/2	1	1	3	2
Steve Bloomer	1	1/1	1	3	1
Alex Leake	1	1	1	3	0
Charlie Roberts	1	1	1	3	0
Stanley Harris	1/1	1		2	1
Dicky Bond	1	1		2	0
Henry Linacre	1		1	2	0
Herbert Smith	1		1	2	0
Howard Spencer	1		1	2	0
Sam Wolstenholme	1	1		2	0
Joseph Bache			1/1	1	1
Arthur Bridgett			1	1	0
Herod Ruddlesdin			1	1	0
Jack Sharp			1	1	0
Billy Balmer		1		1	0
Frank Booth		1		1	0
Jack Carr		1		1	0
Tim Williamson		1		1	0
Harold Hardman	1			1	0
