= Grenville Morris =

Welsh footballer

Personal information
- Full name: Arthur Grenville Morris
- Date of birth: 13 April 1877
- Place of birth: Builth Wells, Wales
- Date of death: 27 November 1959 (aged 82)
- Place of death: West Bridgford, Nottinghamshire, England
- Position: Inside forward

Senior career*
Years	Team	Apps	(Gls)
- Builth Wells
1894–1897	Aberystwyth Town		
1897–1898	Swindon Town	31	(23)
1898–1913	Nottingham Forest	421	(199)

International career
1896–1912	Wales	21	(9)
- * Club domestic league appearances and goals

Arthur Grenville Morris (13 April 1877 – 27 November 1959) was a Welsh footballer who played in the Football League for Nottingham Forest. He is the club's all-time highest scorer with 217 goals. He also played for Aberystwyth Town and Swindon Town, and represented Wales internationally, earning 21 caps between 1896 and 1912.

== Club career ==
Usually just known as Grenville Morris, he was born in Builth Wells, Wales. He was educated at Ellesmere College, Shropshire from May 1892 to December 1893.

Morris began playing football for his local team, Builth Wells F.C. He was still recorded as playing for this team (described as "Builth Football Club" in the press) in the Brecon County Times, of 29 December 1893, scoring a goal in a 4–1 win over Brecon. By January 1894, he was playing for Aberystwyth Town. Morris scored 111 goals for the team in 75 appearances. He moved from Aberystwyth Town to Swindon Town making his debut on 6 February 1897. At this time Swindon played in both the Southern Football League, and the Western Football League. Grenville scored on his debut for Swindon in a game away against North Fleet in the Southern League. He then scored a goal in the game at home to New Brompton in the same league a week later. He went on to play 50 games for the Robins in all competitions, scoring 44 goals. This total consisted of 31 appearances in the Southern League, scoring 23 goals. Sixteen appearances in the Western League, scoring 20 goals. And three appearances in the FA Cup, with 1 goal. He was one of the greatest players of his generation and was known as The Prince of the Inside-Lefts.

Morris moved on to Nottingham Forest in 1898 for a sum of £200. He still holds Forest's all-time goal scoring record with 217 in all competitions.

== International ==
On 29 February 1896, at the age of 18 years and 321 days old he won his first full international Welsh cap against Ireland, scoring a goal in a 6–1 victory. It took place at the Race Course Ground in Wrexham. Morris went on to play 21 times for his country, the last 16 of which were whilst he was with Forest. His last Welsh cap came on 11 March 1912 against England. He scored a total of nine goals in international football.

== Career statistics ==
=== Club ===
Club	Season	League			FA Cup		Total	
Club	Season	Division	Apps	Goals	Apps	Goals	Apps	Goals
Swindon Town	1896–97	Southern Football League	4	2	0	0	4	2
Swindon Town	1897–98	Southern Football League	18	12	3	1	21	13
Swindon Town	1898–99	Southern Football League	9	9	0	0	9	9
Swindon Town	Total		31	23	3	1	34	24
Nottingham Forest	1898–99	First Division	17	7	3	0	19	7
Nottingham Forest	1899–00	First Division	29	8	6	3	35	11
Nottingham Forest	1900–01	First Division	31	14	3	1	34	15
Nottingham Forest	1901–02	First Division	27	7	3	2	30	9
Nottingham Forest	1902–03	First Division	33	24	4	2	37	26
Nottingham Forest	1903–04	First Division	24	12	3	2	27	14
Nottingham Forest	1904–05	First Division	26	12	2	1	43	13
Nottingham Forest	1905–06	First Division	32	19	4	3	36	22
Nottingham Forest	1906–07	Second Division	36	21	2	1	38	22
Nottingham Forest	1907–08	First Division	23	7	1	0	25	7
Nottingham Forest	1908–09	First Division	34	12	3	0	37	12
Nottingham Forest	1909–10	First Division	30	19	1	1	31	20
Nottingham Forest	1910–11	First Division	26	11	1	1	44	12
Nottingham Forest	1911–12	Second Division	19	10	1	0	20	10
Nottingham Forest	1912–13	Second Division	34	16	1	1	35	17
Nottingham Forest	Total		421	199	38	18	459	217
Career total			452	222	41	19	493	241

=== International ===
Wales
Year	Apps	Goals
1896	3	1
1897	1	0
1898	1	0
1899	2	0
1903	2	0
1905	2	2
1907	2	1
1908	1	0
1910	3	2
1911	3	3
1912	1	0
Total	21	9

== Honours ==
Nottingham Forest

- Football League Second Division: 1906–07
