= Wales national football team results (1946–1959) =

The Wales national football team represents Wales in international association football and is governed by the Football Association of Wales (FAW).

== Matches played ==
Between 1946 and 1959 the side played 64 matches. Although the majority of these came against the other national teams of the Home Nations in the British Home Championship, Wales also began playing teams from further afield on a regular basis for the first time. Their first competitive fixture following the end of the conflict was a 3–1 victory over Scotland in October 1946.

In 1949, Wales undertook their first European tour in which they played matches against Portugal, Belgium and Switzerland. Although Wales lost all three games, they won the reverse fixtures when all three nations travelled to Wales within the next two years. During the 1951–52 British Home Championship, Wales recorded their highest finish in the British Home Championship during the period by sharing the title with England.

The side also entered the FIFA World Cup for the first time in the 1950 tournament, but failed to qualify for either this or the following competition in which the Home Championship was used to determine the Home Nations qualifiers. The 1958 FIFA World Cup used a randomly drawn qualifying group and, although Wales finished second behind Czechoslovakia, they qualified winning a play-off match against Israel. In the tournament itself, Wales drew all three of their group matches and finished tied on points with Hungary. The two sides took part in a play-off match to determine who would advance to the quarter-final, which Wales won 2–1. Wales were defeated 1–0 by Brazil in the quarter-final. The 1958 tournament remains the only time Wales have qualified for a World Cup as of 2020.

Of the 64 matches Wales played during this period, they won 18. They recorded the most wins over Northern Ireland and their precursors Ireland, (Note: The team referred to as Ireland which competed in the Home Championship represented the Belfast-based Irish Football Association (IFA). Following the partition of Ireland, both that body and the Dublin-based Football Association of Ireland (FAI) contended that their respective national teams represented the entirety of Ireland. FIFA ruled in 1953 that neither team could be referred to simply as "Ireland".) winning 5 of the 13 fixtures between the two. They also defeated Scotland three times, Israel and Portugal twice and had single victories over six other teams. They drew 14 ties and lost the remaining 32. Wales suffered the most defeats against England, losing 10 of the 14 fixtures between the two sides.

== Results ==
Wales' score is shown first in each case. The colours listed below are also used to signify results combined with the scoreline.

Key
Colour (with score)	Meaning
	Defeat
	Draw
	Win

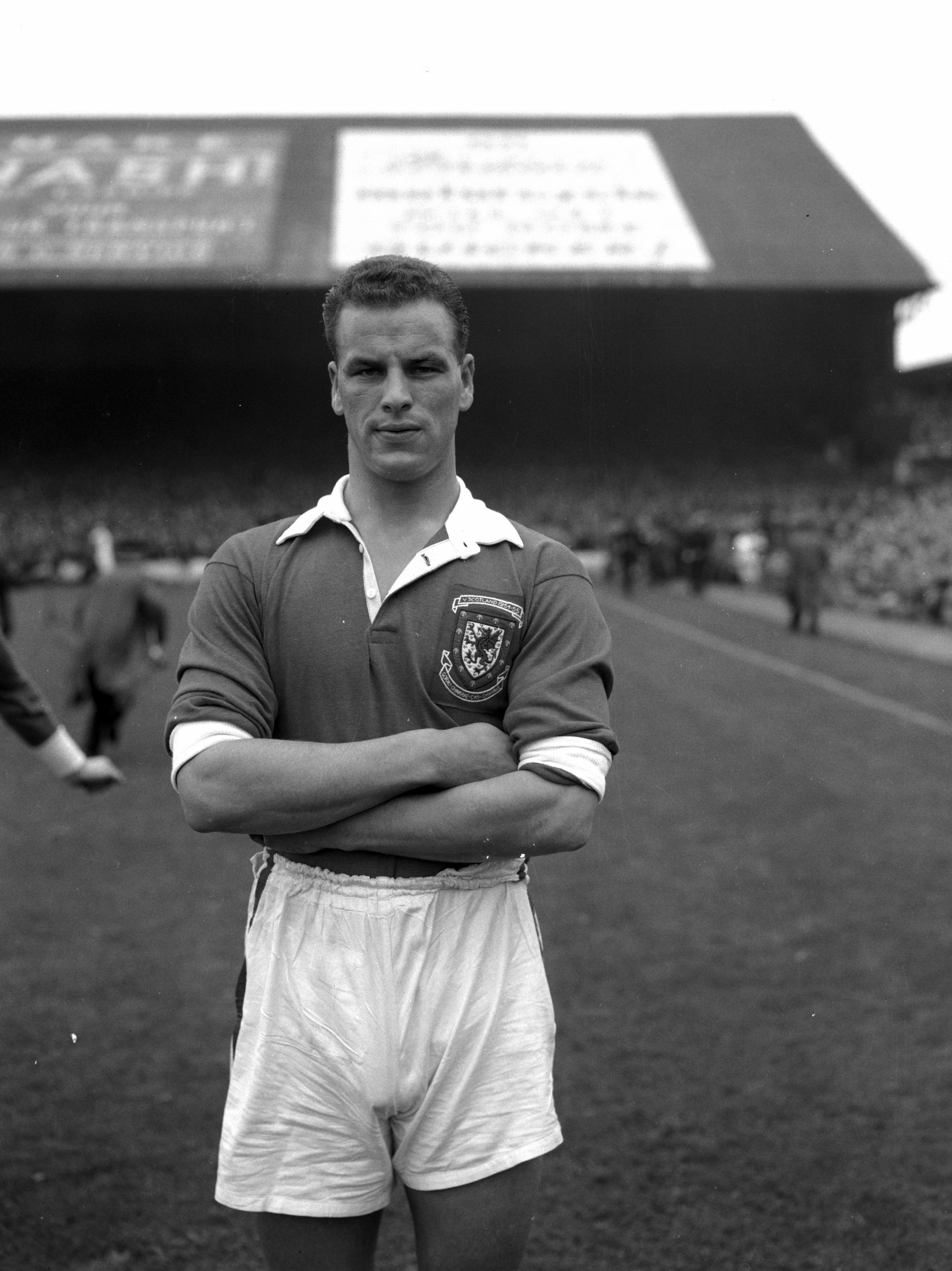
John Charles in 1954 prior to a Wales vs Scotland game at Ninian Park

Wales national football team results 1946–1959 (Note: Table information sourced from the references listed in the statistics section below.)
Match no.	Date	Venue	H/A/N	Opponents	Score	Competition	Wales scorers	Att. (Note: Due to the unavailability of exact figures, some attendance numbers are given as recorded estimates.)
171	19 October 1946	Racecourse Ground, Wrexham	H	Scotland	3–1	1946–47 British Home Championship	Bryn Jones, Trevor Ford, Jimmy Stephen (og)	29,568
172	13 November 1946	Maine Road, Manchester	A	England	0–3	1946–47 British Home Championship		59,250
173	9 March 1947	Windsor Park, Belfast	A	Ireland	1–2	1946–47 British Home Championship	Trevor Ford	43,000
174	18 October 1947	Ninian Park, Cardiff	H	England	0–3	1947–48 British Home Championship		55,000
175	12 November 1947	Hampden Park, Glasgow	A	Scotland	2–1	1947–48 British Home Championship	Trevor Ford, George Lowrie	88,000
176	10 March 1948	Racecourse Ground, Wrexham	H	Ireland	2–0	1947–48 British Home Championship	George Lowrie, George Edwards	32,310
177	23 October 1948	Ninian Park, Cardiff	H	Scotland	1–3	1948–49 British Home Championship	Bryn Jones	59,911
178	10 November 1948	Villa Park, Birmingham	A	England	0–1	1948–49 British Home Championship		68,750
179	10 March 1949	Windsor Park, Belfast	A	Ireland	2–0	1948–49 British Home Championship	George Edwards, Trevor Ford	22,800
180	15 May 1949	Estádio Nacional, Lisbon	A	Portugal	2–3	Friendly	Trevor Ford (2)	51,000
181	23 May 1949	Stade Maurice Dufrasne, Liège	A	Belgium	1–3	Friendly	Trevor Ford	19,079
182	26 May 1949	Wankdorf Stadium, Bern	A	Switzerland	0–4	Friendly		18,000
183	15 October 1949	Ninian Park, Cardiff	H	England	1–4	1949–50 British Home Championship (Note: The 1949–50 British Home Championship was also used to determine which of the Home Nations would qualify for the 1950 FIFA World Cup.)	Mal Griffiths	61,000
184	9 November 1949	Hampden Park, Glasgow	A	Scotland	0–2	1949–50 British Home Championship		73,782
185	23 November 1949	Ninian Park, Cardiff	H	Belgium	5–1	Friendly	Trevor Ford (3), Roy Paul, Roy Clarke	27,988
186	8 March 1950	Racecourse Ground, Wrexham	H	Ireland	0–0	1949–50 British Home Championship		30,000
187	21 October 1950	Ninian Park, Cardiff	H	Scotland	1–3	1950–51 British Home Championship	Aubrey Powell	60,000
188	15 November 1950	Roker Park, Sunderland	A	England	2–4	1950–51 British Home Championship	Trevor Ford (2)	50,250
189	7 March 1951	Windsor Park, Belfast	A	Ireland	2–1	1950–51 British Home Championship	Roy Clarke (2)	12,000
190	12 May 1951	Ninian Park, Cardiff	H	Portugal	2–1	Friendly	Trevor Ford, Mal Griffiths	51,000
191	16 May 1951	Racecourse Ground, Wrexham	H	Switzerland	3–2	Friendly	Trevor Ford (2), Ron Burgess	18,500
192	20 October 1951	Ninian Park, Cardiff	H	England	1–1	1951–52 British Home Championship	Billy Foulkes	51,500
193	14 November 1951	Hampden Park, Glasgow	A	Scotland	1–0	1951–52 British Home Championship	Ivor Allchurch	50,250
194	19 March 1952	Vetch Field, Swansea	H	Ireland	3–0	1951–52 British Home Championship	Walley Barnes, Ivor Allchurch, Roy Clarke	30,000
195	18 October 1952	Ninian Park, Cardiff	H	Scotland	1–2	1952–53 British Home Championship	Trevor Ford	60,261
196	12 November 1952	Wembley Stadium, London	A	England	2–5	1952–53 British Home Championship	Trevor Ford (2)	93,500
197	15 April 1953	Windsor Park, Belfast	A	Ireland	3–2	1952–53 British Home Championship	John Charles (2), Trevor Ford	33,000
198	14 May 1953	Parc des Princes, Paris	A	France	1–6	Friendly	Ivor Allchurch	33,020
199	21 May 1953	JNA Stadium, Belgrade	A	Yugoslavia	2–5	Friendly	Trevor Ford (2)	50,000
200	10 October 1953	Ninian Park, Cardiff	H	England	1–4	1953–54 British Home Championship (Note: The 1953–54 British Home Championship was also used to determine which of the Home Nations would qualify for the 1954 FIFA World Cup.)	Ivor Allchurch	61,000
201	4 November 1953	Hampden Park, Glasgow	A	Scotland	3–3	1953–54 British Home Championship	John Charles (2), Ivor Allchurch	71,378
202	31 March 1954	Racecourse Ground, Wrexham	H	Northern Ireland	1–2	1953–54 British Home Championship	John Charles	32,817
203	9 May 1954	Praterstadion, Vienna	A	Austria	0–2	Friendly		58,000
204	22 September 1954	Ninian Park, Cardiff	H	Yugoslavia	1–3	Friendly	Ivor Allchurch	20,000
205	16 October 1954	Ninian Park, Cardiff	H	Scotland	0–1	1954–55 British Home Championship		53,000
206	10 November 1954	Wembley Stadium, London	A	England	2–3	1954–55 British Home Championship	John Charles (2)	89,789
207	20 April 1955	Windsor Park, Belfast	A	Northern Ireland	3–2	1954–55 British Home Championship	John Charles (3)	28,000
208	22 October 1955	Ninian Park, Cardiff	H	England	2–1	1955–56 British Home Championship	Derek Tapscott, Cliff Jones	60,000
209	9 November 1955	Hampden Park, Glasgow	A	Scotland	0–2	1955–56 British Home Championship		53,887
210	23 November 1955	Racecourse Ground, Wrexham	H	Austria	1–2	Friendly	Derek Tapscott	39,000
211	11 April 1956	Ninian Park, Cardiff	H	Northern Ireland	1–1	1955–56 British Home Championship	Roy Clarke	37,510
212	20 October 1956	Ninian Park, Cardiff	H	Scotland	2–2	1956–57 British Home Championship	Trevor Ford, Terry Medwin	60,000
213	14 November 1956	Wembley Stadium, London	A	England	1–3	1956–57 British Home Championship	John Charles	93,796
214	10 April 1957	Windsor Park, Belfast	A	Northern Ireland	0–0	1956–57 British Home Championship		30,000
215	1 May 1957	Ninian Park, Cardiff	H	Czechoslovakia	1–0	1958 FIFA World Cup Qualification	Roy Vernon	33,320
216	19 May 1957	Zentralstadion, Leipzig	A	East Germany	1–2	1958 FIFA World Cup Qualification	Mel Charles	100,000
217	26 May 1957	Stadion Letná, Prague	A	Czechoslovakia	0–2	1958 FIFA World Cup Qualification		45,000
218	25 September 1957	Ninian Park, Cardiff	H	East Germany	4–1	1958 FIFA World Cup Qualification	Des Palmer (3), Cliff Jones	16,098
219	19 October 1957	Ninian Park, Cardiff	H	England	0–4	1957–58 British Home Championship		58,000
220	13 November 1957	Hampden Park, Glasgow	A	Scotland	1–1	1957–58 British Home Championship	Terry Medwin	42,918
221	15 January 1958	Ramat Gan Stadium, Ramat Gan	A	Israel	2–0	1958 FIFA World Cup Play-Off	Len Allchurch, Dave Bowen	55,000
222	5 February 1958	Ninian Park, Cardiff	H	Israel	2–0	1958 FIFA World Cup Play-Off	Ivor Allchurch, Cliff Jones	38,000
223	16 April 1958	Ninian Park, Cardiff	H	Northern Ireland	1–1	1957–58 British Home Championship	Ron Hewitt	25,667
224	8 June 1958	Jernvallen, Sandviken	N	Hungary	1–1	1958 FIFA World Cup	John Charles	20,000
225	11 June 1958	Råsunda Stadium, Solna	N	Mexico	1–1	1958 FIFA World Cup	Ivor Allchurch	25,000
226	15 June 1958	Råsunda Stadium, Solna	A	Sweden	0–0	1958 FIFA World Cup		35,000
227	17 June 1958	Råsunda Stadium, Solna	N	Hungary	2–1	1958 FIFA World Cup	Ivor Allchurch, Terry Medwin	20,000
228	19 June 1958	Råsunda Stadium, Solna	N	Brazil	0–1	1958 FIFA World Cup		25,000
229	18 October 1958	Ninian Park, Cardiff	H	Scotland	0–3	1958–59 British Home Championship		59,162
230	26 November 1958	Villa Park, Birmingham	A	England	2–2	1958–59 British Home Championship	Derek Tapscott, Ivor Allchurch	40,500
231	22 April 1959	Windsor Park, Belfast	A	Northern Ireland	1–4	1958–59 British Home Championship	Derek Tapscott	45,000
232	17 October 1959	Ninian Park, Cardiff	H	England	1–1	1959–60 British Home Championship	Graham Moore	60,000
233	4 November 1959	Hampden Park, Glasgow	A	Scotland	1–1	1959–60 British Home Championship	John Charles	55,813

== Head to head records ==
Head to head records
Opponent	P	W	D	L	GF	GA	W%	D%	L%
Austria	2	0	0	2	1	4	0	0	100
Belgium	2	1	0	1	6	4	50	0	50
Brazil	1	0	0	1	0	1	0	0	100
Czechoslovakia	2	1	0	1	1	2	50	0	50
East Germany	2	1	0	1	5	3	50	0	50
England	14	1	3	10	13	39	7	21	71
France	1	0	0	1	1	6	0	0	100
Hungary	2	1	1	0	3	1	50	50	0
Ireland	4	1	1	2	3	4	25	25	50
Israel	2	2	0	0	4	0	100	0	0
Mexico	1	0	1	0	1	1	0	100	0
Northern Ireland	9	4	3	2	15	13	44	33	22
Portugal	3	2	0	1	4	4	67	0	33
Scotland	14	3	4	7	16	25	21	29	50
Sweden	1	0	1	0	0	0	0	100	0
Switzerland	2	1	0	1	3	6	50	0	50
Yugoslavia	2	0	0	2	2	8	0	0	100
Totals	64	18	14	32	78	121	28.13	21.88	50
