= Wales national football team results (2020–present) =

- Win Draw Loss

This is a list of the Wales national football team results from 2020 to present.

== Fixtures and results ==
=== 2020 ===
3 September 2020 Nations League B	Finland	0–1	Wales	Helsinki, Finland
21:45 UTC+3		UEFA Report	Moore 80'	Stadium: Helsinki Olympic Stadium; Attendance: 0 (Note: Due to the COVID-19 pandemic in Europe, all matches scheduled for September 2020 were played behind closed doors.); Referee: Daniel Siebert (Germany)

6 September 2020 Nations League B	Wales	1–0	Bulgaria	Cardiff, Wales
14:00 UTC+1	N. Williams 90+4'	UEFA Report		Stadium: Cardiff City Stadium; Attendance: 0 Referee: Fábio Veríssimo (Portugal)

8 October 2020 Friendly	England	3–0	Wales	London, England
19:45 UTC+1	Calvert-Lewin 26'; Coady 53'; Ings 63'	BBC Report		Stadium: Wembley Stadium; Attendance: 0 Referee: Bobby Madden (Scotland)

11 October 2020 Nations League B	Republic of Ireland	0–0	Wales	Dublin, Ireland
14:00 UTC+1		UEFA Report		Stadium: Aviva Stadium; Attendance: 0 (Note: Due to the COVID-19 pandemic in Europe, the match was played behind closed doors.); Referee: Anastasios Sidiropoulos (Greece)

14 October 2020 Nations League B	Bulgaria	0–1	Wales	Sofia, Bulgaria
21:45 UTC+3		UEFA Report	J. Williams 85'	Stadium: Vasil Levski National Stadium; Attendance: 478; Referee: Aliyar Aghayev (Azerbaijan)

12 November 2020 Friendly	Wales	0–0	United States	Swansea, Wales
19:45 UTC+0		BBC Report		Stadium: Liberty Stadium; Attendance: 0 Referee: Nick Walsh (Scotland)
Note: Match originally scheduled for 30 March 2020, but postponed due to a spike in COVID-19 cases.

15 November 2020 Nations League B	Wales	1–0	Republic of Ireland	Cardiff, Wales
17:00 UTC+0	Brooks 67'	UEFA Report		Stadium: Cardiff City Stadium; Attendance: 0 Referee: Petr Ardeleánu (Czech Republic)

18 November 2020 Nations League B	Wales	3–1	Finland	Cardiff, Wales
19:45 UTC+0	Wilson 29'; James 46'; Moore 84'	UEFA Report	Pukki 63'	Stadium: Cardiff City Stadium; Attendance: 0 Referee: Jesús Gil Manzano (Spain)

=== 2021 ===
24 March 2021 2022 World Cup qual.	Belgium	3–1	Wales	Leuven, Belgium
20:45 UTC+1	De Bruyne 22'; Hazard 28'; Lukaku 73' (pen.)	BBC Report	Wilson 11'	Stadium: Den Dreef; Attendance: 0 Referee: Cüneyt Çakır (Turkey)

27 March 2021 Friendly	Wales	1–0	Mexico	Cardiff, Wales
20:00 UTC+0	Moore 11'	BBC Report		Stadium: Cardiff City Stadium; Attendance: 0 Referee: Ian McNabb (Northern Ireland)

30 March 2021 2022 World Cup qual.	Wales	1–0	Czech Republic	Cardiff, Wales
19:45 UTC+1	James 82'	BBC Report		Stadium: Cardiff City Stadium; Attendance: 0 Referee: Ovidiu Haţegan (Romania)

2 June 2021 Friendly	France	3–0	Wales	Nice, France
21:00 UTC+2	Mbappé 34'; Griezmann 47'; Dembélé 79'	BBC Report		Stadium: Allianz Riviera; Attendance: 0 Referee: Luís Godinho (Portugal)

5 June 2021 Friendly	Wales	0–0	Albania	Cardiff, Wales
17:00 UTC+1		BBC Report		Stadium: Cardiff City Stadium; Attendance: 6,500; Referee: Neil Doyle (Ireland)

12 June 2021 Euro 2020 Group A	Wales	1–1	Switzerland	Baku, Azerbaijan
17:00 UTC+4	Moore 74'	UEFA Report	Embolo 49'	Stadium: Olympic Stadium; Attendance: 8,782; Referee: Clément Turpin (France)

16 June 2021 Euro 2020 Group A	Turkey	0–2	Wales	Baku, Azerbaijan
20:00 UTC+4		UEFA Report	Ramsey 42'; C. Roberts 90+5'	Stadium: Olympic Stadium; Attendance: 19,762; Referee: Artur Soares Dias (Portugal)

20 June 2021 Euro 2020 Group A	Italy	1–0	Wales	Rome, Italy
18:00 UTC+2	Pessina 39'	UEFA Report		Stadium: Stadio Olimpico; Attendance: 11,541; Referee: Ovidiu Hațegan (Romania)

26 June 2021 Euro 2020 R16	Wales	0–4	Denmark	Amsterdam, Netherlands
18:00 UTC+2		UEFA Report	Dolberg 27', 48'; Mæhle 88'; Braithwaite 90+4'	Stadium: Johan Cruyff Arena; Attendance: 14,645; Referee: Daniel Siebert (Germany)

1 September 2021 Friendly	Finland	0–0	Wales	Helsinki, Finland
19:00 UTC+3		BBC Report		Stadium: Helsinki Olympic Stadium; Attendance: 4,357; Referee: Kristo Tohver (Estonia)

5 September 2021 2022 World Cup qual.	Belarus	2–3	Wales	Kazan, Russia
16:00 UTC+3	V. Lisakovich 29' (pen.); Sedko 31'	BBC Report	Bale 6' (pen.), 69' (pen.), 90+3'	Stadium: Central Stadium; Attendance: 0 Referee: Giorgi Kruashvili (Georgia)

8 September 2021 2022 World Cup qual.	Wales	0–0	Estonia	Cardiff, Wales
19:45 UTC+1		BBC Report		Stadium: Cardiff City Stadium; Attendance: 21,624; Referee: Ruddy Buquet (France)

8 October 2021 2022 World Cup qual.	Czech Republic	2–2	Wales	Prague, Czech Republic
20:45 UTC+2	Pešek 38'; Ward 49' (o.g.)	BBC Report	Ramsey 36'; James 69'	Stadium: Sinobo Stadium; Attendance: 16,856; Referee: Deniz Aytekin (Germany)

11 October 2021 2022 World Cup qual.	Estonia	0–1	Wales	Tallinn, Estonia
20:45 UTC+2		BBC Report	Moore 12'	Stadium: A. Le Coq Arena; Attendance: 5,118; Referee: Sandro Schärer (Switzerland)

13 November 2021 2022 World Cup qual.	Wales	5–1	Belarus	Cardiff, Wales
19:45 UTC+0	Ramsey 3', 50' (pen.); N. Williams 20'; B. Davies 77'; C. Roberts 89'	BBC Report	Kontsevoy 87'	Stadium: Cardiff City Stadium; Attendance: 27,152; Referee: Maurizio Mariani (Italy)

16 November 2021 2022 World Cup qual.	Wales	1–1	Belgium	Cardiff, Wales
19:45 UTC+0	Moore 32'	BBC Report	De Bruyne 12'	Stadium: Cardiff City Stadium; Attendance: 32,343; Referee: Artur Soares Dias (Portugal)

=== 2022 ===
24 March 2022 2022 World Cup qual. PO SF	Wales	2–1	Austria	Cardiff, Wales
19:45 UTC+0	Bale 25', 51'	BBC report	Sabitzer 65'	Stadium: Cardiff City Stadium; Attendance: 32,053; Referee: Szymon Marciniak (Poland)

29 March 2022 Friendly	Wales	1–1	Czech Republic	Cardiff, Wales
19:45 UTC+1	Colwill 34'	BBC report	Souček 32'	Stadium: Cardiff City Stadium; Attendance: 12,912; Referee: Paul Tierney (England)

1 June 2022 Nations League A	Poland	2–1	Wales	Wrocław, Poland
18:00 UTC+2	Kamiński 72'; Świderski 85'	UEFA report BBC report	J. Williams 52'	Stadium: Stadion Wrocław; Attendance: 35,214; Referee: Rade Obrenovič (Slovenia)

5 June 2022 2022 World Cup qual PO Final	Wales	1–0	Ukraine	Cardiff, Wales
17:00 UTC+1	Andriy Yarmolenko 34' (o.g.)	BBC report		Stadium: Cardiff City Stadium; Attendance: 32,660; Referee: Antonio Mateu Lahoz (Spain)

8 June 2022 Nations League A	Wales	1–2	Netherlands	Cardiff, Wales
19:45 UTC+1	Norrington-Davies 90+2'	UEFA report BBC report	Koopmeiners 50'; Weghorst 90+4'	Stadium: Cardiff City Stadium; Attendance: 23,395; Referee: Glenn Nyberg (Sweden)

11 June 2022 Nations League A	Wales	1–1	Belgium	Cardiff, Wales
19:45 UTC+1	Johnson 86'	BBC report UEFA report	Tielemans 51'	Stadium: Cardiff City Stadium; Attendance: 27,188; Referee: Benoît Bastien (France)

14 June 2022 Nations League A	Netherlands	3–2	Wales	Rotterdam, Netherlands
20:45 UTC+2	Lang 17'; Gakpo 23'; Depay 90+3'	BBC report UEFA report	Johnson 26'; Bale 90+2' (pen.)	Stadium: Stadion Feijenoord; Attendance: 37,247; Referee: Horațiu Feșnic (Romania)

22 September 2022 Nations League A	Belgium	2–1	Wales	Brussels, Belgium
20:45 UTC+2	De Bruyne 10'; Batshuayi 37'	BBC report UEFA report	Moore 50'	Stadium: King Baudouin Stadium; Attendance: 28,463; Referee: Ali Palabıyık (Turkey)

25 September 2022 Nations League A	Wales	0–1	Poland	Cardiff, Wales
19:45 UTC+1		BBC report UEFA report	Świderski 57'	Stadium: Cardiff City Stadium; Attendance: 31,520; Referee: Andris Treimanis (Latvia)

21 November 2022 2022 World Cup Group B	United States	1–1	Wales	Al Rayyan, Qatar
22:00 UTC+3	Weah 36'	FIFA report BBC report	Bale 82' (pen.)	Stadium: Ahmad bin Ali Stadium; Attendance: 43,418; Referee: Abdulrahman Al-Jassim (Qatar)

25 November 2022 2022 World Cup Group B	Wales	0–2	Iran	Al Rayyan, Qatar
13:00 UTC+3		FIFA report BBC report	Cheshmi 90+8'; Rezaeian 90+11'	Stadium: Ahmad bin Ali Stadium; Attendance: 40,875; Referee: Mario Escobar (Guatemala)

29 November 2022 2022 World Cup Group B	Wales	0–3	England	Al Rayyan, Qatar
22:00 UTC+3		FIFA report BBC report	Rashford 50', 68'; Foden 51'	Stadium: Ahmad bin Ali Stadium; Attendance: 44,297; Referee: Slavko Vinčić (Slovenia)

=== 2023 ===
25 March 2023 Euro 2024 qual.	Croatia	1–1	Wales	Split, Croatia
20:45 UTC+2	Kramarić 28'	UEFA Report; BBC report	Broadhead 90+3'	Stadium: Stadion Poljud; Attendance: 33,474; Referee: João Pinheiro (Portugal)

28 March 2023 Euro 2024 qual.	Wales	1–0	Latvia	Cardiff, Wales
19:45 UTC+1	Moore 41'	UEFA Report; BBC report		Stadium: Cardiff City Stadium; Attendance: 32,806; Referee: Giorgi Kruashvili (Georgia)

16 June 2023 Euro 2024 qual.	Wales	2–4	Armenia	Cardiff, Wales
19:45 UTC+1	James 10'; Wilson 72'	BBC report UEFA Report	Zelarayán 19', 75'; Ranos 30', 66'	Stadium: Cardiff City Stadium; Attendance: 32,774; Referee: Georgi Kabakov (Bulgaria)

19 June 2023 Euro 2024 qual.	Turkey	2–0	Wales	Samsun, Turkey
21:45 UTC+3	Nayir 72'; Güler 80'	BBC report UEFA Report		Stadium: 19 Mayıs Stadium; Attendance: 28,766; Referee: Fabio Maresca (Italy)

7 September 2023 Friendly	Wales	0–0	South Korea	Cardiff, Wales
19:45 UTC+1		BBC report Soccerway; Sky report		Stadium: Cardiff City Stadium; Attendance: 13,668; Referee: Willie Collum (Scotland)

11 September 2023 Euro 2024 qual.	Latvia	0–2	Wales	Riga, Latvia
20:45 UTC+2		BBC Report; Sky Report; UEFA Report	Ramsey 29' (pen.); Brooks 90+6'	Stadium: Skonto Stadium; Attendance: 6,464; Referee: Michal Ocenáš (Slovakia)

11 October 2023 Friendly	Wales	4–0	Gibraltar	Wrexham, Wales
19:45 UTC+1	Davies 22'; Moore 26', 45'; Broadhead 35'	BBC report Sky report Soccerway report		Stadium: Racecourse Ground; Attendance: 10,008; Referee: Philip Farrugia (Malta)

15 October 2023 Euro 2024 qual.	Wales	2–1	Croatia	Cardiff, Wales
19:45 UTC+1	Wilson 47', 60'	BBC report Sky report UEFA Report	Pašalić 75'	Stadium: Cardiff City Stadium; Attendance: 31,240; Referee: Davide Massa (Italy)

18 November 2023 Euro 2024 qual.	Armenia	1–1	Wales	Yerevan, Armenia
18:00 UTC+4	Zelarayán 5'	BBC report Sky report UEFA Report	Tiknizyan 45+2' (o.g.)	Stadium: Vazgen Sargsyan Republican Stadium; Attendance: 14,271; Referee: Benoît Bastien (France)

21 November 2023 Euro 2024 qual.	Wales	1–1	Turkey	Cardiff, Wales
19:45	Williams 7'	BBC report Sky report UEFA Report	Yazıcı 70' (pen.)	Stadium: Cardiff City Stadium; Attendance: 32,291; Referee: Matej Jug (Slovenia)

=== 2024 ===
21 March 2024 Euro 2024 qual. PO SF	Wales	4–1	Finland	Cardiff, Wales
19:45 UTC+0	Brooks 3'; Williams 38'; Johnson 47'; D. James 86'	BBC report Sky report Soccerway; UEFA report	Pukki 45'	Stadium: Cardiff City Stadium; Attendance: 32,162; Referee: István Kovács (Romania)

26 March 2024 Euro 2024 qual. PO Final	Wales	0–0 (a.e.t.) (4–5 p)	Poland	Cardiff, Wales
19:45 UTC+0	Mepham (yellow card) 98' (yellow-red card) 120+1'	BBC report Sky report UEFA report		Stadium: Cardiff City Stadium; Attendance: 31,876; Referee: Daniele Orsato (Italy)
	Penalties
	Davies (penalty scored); Moore (penalty scored); Wilson (penalty scored); Williams (penalty scored); James (penalty missed)		(penalty scored) Lewandowski; (penalty scored) Szymański; (penalty scored) Frankowski; (penalty scored) Zalewski; (penalty scored) Piątek

6 June 2024 Friendly	Gibraltar	0–0	Wales	Almancil, Portugal
18:00 UTC+2		BBC report Soccerway report Sky report		Stadium: Estádio Algarve; Attendance: 5,004; Referee: Jamie Robinson (Northern Ireland)

9 June 2024 Friendly	Slovakia	4–0	Wales	Trnava, Slovakia
20:45 UTC+2	Kucka 45'; Boženík 56'; Ampadu 60' (o.g.); Bénes 90'	BBC report Soccerway report Sky report		Stadium: Štadión Antona Malatinského; Attendance: 6,348; Referee: Daniel Stefański (Poland)

6 September 2024 Nations League B	Wales	0–0	Turkey	Cardiff, Wales
19:45 UTC+1		BBC report Sky report	Yılmaz (yellow card) 31' (yellow-red card) 62'	Stadium: Cardiff City Stadium; Attendance: 28,265; Referee: Rohit Saggi (Norway)

9 September 2024 Nations League B	Montenegro	1–2	Wales	Nikšić, Montenegro
20:45 UTC+2	Camaj 73'	BBC report Sky report Soccerway report	Moore 1'; Wilson 3'	Stadium: Gradski Stadium; Attendance: 3,569; Referee: Georgi Kabakov (Bulgaria)

11 October 2024 Nations League B	Iceland	2–2	Wales	Reykjavík, Iceland
19:45 UTC+0	Tómasson 69'; Ward 72' (o.g.)	BBC report Sky report UEFA report	Johnson 11'; Wilson 29'	Stadium: Laugardalsvöllur; Attendance: 6,141; Referee: Antoni Bandić (Bosnia & Herzegovina)

14 October 2024 Nations League B	Wales	1–0	Montenegro	Cardiff, Wales
19:45 UTC+1	Wilson 36' (pen.)	BBC report Sky report UEFA report		Stadium: Cardiff City Stadium; Attendance: 27,326; Referee: Filip Glova (Slovakia)

16 November 2024 Nations League B	Turkey	0–0	Wales	Kayseri, Turkey
20:00 UTC+3	Aktürkoğlu (penalty missed) 89'	BBC report Sky report UEFA report		Stadium: Kadir Has Stadium; Attendance: 28,812; Referee: Juan Martínez Munuera (Spain)

19 November 2024 Nations League B	Wales	4–1	Iceland	Cardiff, Wales
19:45 UTC+0	Cullen 32', 45+1'; Johnson 65'; Wilson 79'	BBC report Sky report UEFA report	Guðjohnsen 7'	Stadium: Cardiff City Stadium; Attendance: 28,240; Referee: António Nobre (Portugal)

=== 2025 ===
22 March 2025 2026 World Cup qual.	Wales	3–1	Kazakhstan	Cardiff, Wales
19:45 UTC+0	James 9'; Davies 47'; Matondo 90'	BBC report Sky report UEFA report	Tagybergen 32' (pen.)	Stadium: Cardiff City Stadium; Attendance: 32,473; Referee: Donatas Rumšas (Lithuania)

25 March 2025 2026 World Cup qual.	North Macedonia	1–1	Wales	Skopje, North Macedonia
19:45 UTC+1	Miovski 90+1'	BBC report Sky report UEFA report	Brooks 90+6'	Stadium: Toše Proeski Arena; Attendance: 23,114; Referee: Jérôme Brisard (France)

6 June 2025 2026 World Cup qual.	Wales	3–0	Liechtenstein	Cardiff, Wales
19:45 UTC+1	Rodon 40'; Wilson 65'; Moore 68'	BBC report Sky report UEFA report		Stadium: Cardiff City Stadium; Attendance: 30,646; Referee: Anastasios Papapetrou (Greece)

9 June 2025 2026 World Cup qual.	Belgium	4–3	Wales	Brussels, Belgium
20:45 UTC+2	Lukaku 15' (pen.); Tielemans 19'; Doku 28'; De Bruyne 88'	BBC report Sky report UEFA report	Wilson 45+7' (pen.); Thomas 52'; Johnson 70'	Stadium: King Baudouin Stadium; Attendance: 33,653; Referee: Irfan Peljto (Bosnia and Herzegovina)

4 September 2025 2026 World Cup qual.	Kazakhstan	0–1	Wales	Astana, Kazakhstan
19:00 UTC+5		BBC report Sky report UEFA report	Moore 24'	Stadium: Astana Arena; Attendance: 28,219; Referee: Alejandro Hernández Hernández (Spain)

9 September 2025 Friendly	Wales	0–1	Canada	Swansea, Wales
19:45 UTC+1		BBC Report; Sky report	Cornelius 41'	Stadium: Swansea.com Stadium; Attendance: 15,024; Referee: Robert Jones (England)

9 October 2025 Friendly	England	3–0	Wales	London, England
19:45 UTC+1	Rogers 3'; Watkins 11'; Saka 20'	BBC report Sky report UEFA report		Stadium: Wembley Stadium; Attendance: 78,126; Referee: Urs Schnyder (Switzerland)

13 October 2025 2026 World Cup qual.	Wales	2–4	Belgium	Cardiff, Wales
19:45 UTC+1	Rodon 8'; Broadhead 89'	BBC report Sky report UEFA report	De Bruyne 18' (pen.), 76' (pen.); Meunier 24'; Trossard 90'	Stadium: Cardiff City Stadium; Attendance: 32,803; Referee: Daniel Siebert (Germany)

15 November 2025 2026 World Cup qual.	Liechtenstein	0–1	Wales	Vaduz, Liechtenstein
18:00 UTC+1		BBC report Sky report UEFA report	J. James 61'	Stadium: Rheinpark Stadion; Attendance: 5,563; Referee: Juxhin Xhaja (Albania)

18 November 2025 2026 World Cup qual.	Wales	7–1	North Macedonia	Cardiff, Wales
19:45 UTC+0	Wilson 18', 75', 81' (pen.); Brooks 21'; Johnson 37'; D.James 57'; Broadhead 88'	BBC report Sky report UEFA report	Miovski 23'	Stadium: Cardiff City Stadium; Attendance: 32,154; Referee: Danny Makkelie (Netherlands)

=== 2026 ===
26 March 2026 2026 World Cup qual. PO	Wales	1–1 (a.e.t.) (2–4 p)	Bosnia and Herzegovina	Cardiff, Wales
19:45 UTC+0	D James 51'	BBC report UEFA report Sky report	Džeko 86'	Stadium: Cardiff City Stadium; Attendance: 32,487; Referee: István Kovács (Romania)
	Penalties
	Wilson (penalty scored); Harris (penalty scored); Johnson (penalty missed); Williams (penalty missed)		(penalty missed) Demirović; (penalty scored) Tabakovic; (penalty scored) Bašić; (penalty scored) Hadziahmetovic; (penalty scored) Alajbegović

31 March 2026 Friendly	Wales	1–1	Northern Ireland	Cardiff, Wales
19:45 UTC+1	Thomas 46'	BBC report Sky report UEFA report	Donley 22'	Stadium: Cardiff City Stadium; Attendance: 33,280; Referee: Robert Hennessy (Ireland)

2 June 2026 Friendly	Wales	1–1	Ghana	Cardiff, Wales
19:45 UTC+1	Koumas 90+4'	BBC report Sky report UEFA report	Yirenkyi 66'	Stadium: Cardiff City Stadium; Attendance: 11,806; Referee: Oscar Johnson (Sweden)

6 June 2026 Friendly	Romania	2–1	Wales	Bucharest, Romania
18:45 UTC+3	Coman 52'; Rus 80'	BBC report Sky report	Brooks 63'	Stadium: Steaua Stadium; Attendance: 23,276; Referee: Rohit Saggi (Norway)

24 September 2026 Nations League A	Portugal	1–0	Wales	Lisbon, Portugal
19:45 UTC+1	Félix 22'	BBC report Sky report UEFA report		Stadium: Estádio José Alvalade; Attendance: 47,725; Referee: Donatas Rumšas (Lithuania)

27 September 2026 Nations League A	Denmark	2–0	Wales	Copenhagen, Denmark
18:00 UTC+2	Davies 53' (o.g.); Isaksen 66'	BBC report Sky report UEFA report		Stadium: Parken Stadium; Attendance: 34,558; Referee: Willy Delajod (France)

1 October 2026 Nations League A	Wales	2–1	Norway	Cardiff, Wales
19:45 UTC+1	James 38'; Williams 48'	UEFA report BBC report Sky report	Bobb 11'	Stadium: Cardiff City Stadium; Attendance: 32,076; Referee: Alejandro Hernández Hernández (Spain)

4 October 2026 Nations League A	Wales	0–1	Denmark	Cardiff, Wales
19:45 UTC+1		BBC report Sky report UEFA report	Højlund 75' (pen.)	Stadium: Cardiff City Stadium; Attendance: 25,108; Referee: Irfan Peljto (Bosnia and Herzegovina)

14 November 2026 Nations League A	Norway	3–1	Wales	Oslo, Norway
18:00 UTC+1	Nusa 59'; Schjelderup 68'; Haaland 88' (pen.)	BBC report Sky report UEFA report	Brooks 79'	Stadium: Ullevaal Stadion; Attendance: 25,317; Referee: Oleksii Derevinskyi (Ukraine)

17 November 2026 Nations League A	Wales	2–3	Portugal	Cardiff, Wales
19:45 UTC+0	Brooks 13'; Thomas 40'	BBC report Sky report UEFA report	Fernandes 11'; Neto 43', (yellow card) 72' (yellow-red card) 74'; Forbs 70'	Stadium: Cardiff City Stadium; Attendance: 32,682; Referee: Sven Jablonski (Germany)
