= Wales national football team results (2000–2019) =

This article lists the results for the Wales national football team from 2000 through to 2019.

== 2000s ==
=== 2000 ===
23 February 2000 Friendly	Qatar	0–1	Wales	Al-Arabi Stadium, Doha
15:00 GMT		BBC report	10' John Robinson	Attendance: 2,000; Referee: Abdul Hamed (Bahrain)

29 March 2000 Friendly	Wales	1–2	Finland	Millennium Stadium, Cardiff
19:00 BST	Ryan Giggs 61'	BBC Report	20' Jari Litmanen; 42' (o.g.) Nathan Blake	Attendance: 65,614; Referee: Michael Ross (Northern Ireland)

23 May 2000 Friendly	Wales	0–3	Brazil	Millennium Stadium, Cardiff
19:30 BST		BBC Report	62' Élber; 70' Cafu; 72' Rivaldo	Attendance: 71,495; Referee: Vitor Manuel de Melo Pereira (Portugal)

2 June 2000 Friendly	Portugal	3–0	Wales	Estádio Municipal de Chaves, Chaves
21:00 BST	Luís Figo 21'; Ricardo Sá Pinto 44'; Capucho 66'	BBC Report		Attendance: 11,000; Referee: Frank De Bleeckere (Belgium)

2 September 2000 2002 World Cup qual.	Belarus	2–1	Wales	Dinamo Stadium, Minsk
17:00	Alyaksandr Khatskevich 39'; Valentin Belkevich 56'	BBC Report	90+3' Gary Speed	Attendance: 32,000; Referee: Alfredo Trentalange (Italy)

7 October 2000 2002 World Cup qual.	Wales	1–1	Norway	Millennium Stadium, Cardiff
15:00 BST	Nathan Blake 60'	BBC Report	80' Thorstein Helstad	Attendance: 53,360; Referee: Hartmut Strampe (Germany)

11 October 2000 2002 World Cup qual.	Poland	0–0	Wales	Stadion Wojska Polskiego, Warsaw
20:00		BBC Report		Attendance: 11,000; Referee: Lucilio Cardoso Cortez Batista (Portugal)

=== 2001 ===
24 March 2001 2002 World Cup qual.	Armenia	2–2	Wales	Hanrapetakan Stadium, Yerevan
19:00	Artak Minasyan 33'; Andrei Movsesyan 67'	BBC Report	40', 48' John Hartson	Attendance: 12,000; Referee: Georgios Kasnaferis (Greece)

28 March 2001 2002 World Cup qual.	Wales	1–1	Ukraine	Millennium Stadium, Cardiff
19:30 BST	John Hartson 12'	BBC Report	51' Andriy Shevchenko	Attendance: 49,847; Referee: Eric Romain (Belgium)

2 June 2001 2002 World Cup qual.	Wales	1–2	Poland	Millennium Stadium, Cardiff
15:00 BST	Nathan Blake 14'	BBC Report	32' Emmanuel Olisadebe; 72' Paweł Kryszałowicz	Attendance: 48,500; Referee: Erol Ersoy (Turkey)

6 June 2001 2002 World Cup qual.	Ukraine	1–1	Wales	Olimpiysky National Sports Complex, Kyiv
19:00	Hennadiy Zubov 44'	BBC Report	72' Mark Pembridge	Attendance: 37,000; Referee: Joaquim Paulo Gomes F.Paraty (Portugal)

1 September 2001 2002 World Cup qual.	Wales	0–0	Armenia	Millennium Stadium, Cardiff
15:00 BST		BBC Report		Attendance: 20,000; Referee: Joseph Attard (Malta)

5 September 2001 2002 World Cup qual.	Norway	3–2	Wales	Ullevaal Stadium, Oslo
19:00	Ronny Johnsen 17'; John Carew 65'; Frode Johnsen 89'	BBC Report	10' Robbie Savage; 28' Craig Bellamy	Attendance: 18,211; Referee: Frits Stuchlik (Austria)

6 October 2001 2002 World Cup qual.	Wales	1–0	Belarus	Millennium Stadium, Cardiff
14:30 BST	John Hartson 47'	BBC Report		Attendance: 10,201; Referee: Pasquale Rodomonti (Italy)

=== 2002 ===
13 February 2002 Friendly	Wales	1–1	Argentina	Millennium Stadium, Cardiff
19:30 GMT	Craig Bellamy 34'	BBC Report	62' Julio Ricardo Cruz	Attendance: 61,738; Referee: Paul McKeon (Republic of Ireland)

27 March 2002 Friendly	Wales	0–0	Czech Republic	Millennium Stadium, Cardiff
19:15 BST		BBC Report		Attendance: 21,209; Referee: Claus Bo Larsen (Denmark)

14 May 2002 Friendly	Wales	1–0	Germany	Millennium Stadium, Cardiff
19:45 BST	Robert Earnshaw 46'	BBC Report		Attendance: 36,059; Referee: Roy Helge Olsen (Norway)

21 August 2002 Friendly	Croatia	1–1	Wales	Stadion Varteks, Varaždin
19:45	Petrić 80'	BBC Report	10' S. Davies	Attendance: 6,500; Referee: Michael L Frohlich (Germany)

7 September 2002 Euro 2004 qual.	Finland	0–2	Wales	Helsinki Olympic Stadium, Helsinki
17:00		BBC Report	30' John Hartson; 72' Simon Davies	Attendance: 35,833; Referee: Konrad Plautz (Austria)

16 October 2002 Euro 2004 qual.	Wales	2–1	Italy	Millennium Stadium, Cardiff
19:30 BST	Simon Davies 11'; Craig Bellamy 70'	BBC Report	31' Alessandro del Piero	Attendance: 70,000; Referee: Gilles Veissiere (France)

20 November 2002 Euro 2004 qual.	Azerbaijan	0–2	Wales	Tofiq Bahramov Stadium, Baku
19:00		BBC Report	10' Gary Speed; 68' John Hartson	Attendance: 12,000; Referee: Luc Huyghe (Belgium)

=== 2003 ===
12 February 2003 Friendly	Wales	2–2	Bosnia and Herzegovina	Millennium Stadium, Cardiff
19:45 GMT	Robert Earnshaw 8'; John Hartson 64'	BBC Report	5' Elvir Baljic; 54' Sergej Barbarez	Attendance: 22,000; Referee: David Malcolm (Northern Ireland)

29 March 2003 Euro 2004 qual.	Wales	4–0	Azerbaijan	Millennium Stadium, Cardiff
15:30 BST	Craig Bellamy 1'; Gary Speed 40'; John Hartson 43'; Ryan Giggs 52'	BBC Report		Attendance: 73,500; Referee: Philippe Leuba (Switzerland)

26 May 2003 Friendly	United States	2–0	Wales	Spartan Stadium, San Jose
19:00	Landon Donovan 41' (pen.); Eddie Lewis 60'	BBC Report		Attendance: 12,282; Referee: Benito Archundia Tellez (Mexico)

20 August 2003 Euro 2004 qual.	Serbia and Montenegro	1–0	Wales	Stadion Crvena Zvezda, Belgrade
20:15	Dragan Mladenović 73'	BBC Report		Attendance: 22,000; Referee: Anders Frisk (Sweden)

6 September 2003 Euro 2004 qual.	Italy	4–0	Wales	Giuseppe Meazza Stadium, Milan
20:15	Filippo Inzaghi 59', 63', 70'; Alessandro del Piero 76' (pen.)	BBC Report		Attendance: 80,000; Referee: Markus Merk (Germany)

10 September 2003 Euro 2004 qual.	Wales	1–1	Finland	Millennium Stadium, Cardiff
19:45 BST	Simon Davies 3'	BBC Report	79' Mikael Forssell	Attendance: 73,411; Referee: Arturo Duadén Ibánez (Spain)

11 October 2003 Euro 2004 qual.	Wales	2–3	Serbia and Montenegro	Millennium Stadium, Cardiff
15:30 BST	John Hartson 26' (pen.); Robert Earnshaw 90+3'	BBC Report	6' Zvonimir Vukić; 82' Savo Milošević; 88' Danijel Ljuboja	Attendance: 72,514; Referee: Fritz Stuchlik (Austria)

15 November 2003 Euro 2004 play-off	Russia	0–0	Wales	Lokomotiv Stadium, Moscow
19:00		BBC Report		Attendance: 30,000; Referee: Lucílio Batista (Portugal)

19 November 2003 Euro 2004 play-off	Wales	0–1	Russia	Millennium Stadium, Cardiff
19:30 GMT		BBC Report	21' Vadim Evseev	Attendance: 73,026; Referee: Manuel Mejuto González (Spain)

=== 2004 ===
18 February 2004 Friendly	Wales	4–0	Scotland	Millennium Stadium, Cardiff
19:45 GMT	Robert Earnshaw 1', 31', 58'; Gareth Taylor 80'	BBC Report		Attendance: 47,124; Referee: Michael Ross (Northern Ireland)

31 March 2004 Friendly	Hungary	1–2	Wales	Ferenc Puskas Stadium, Budapest
20:00	Krisztian Kenesei 18' (pen.)	BBC Report	20' Jason Koumas; 81' Robert Earnshaw	Attendance: 15,000; Referee: Florian Meyer (Germany)

27 May 2004 Friendly	Norway	0–0	Wales	Ullevaal Stadium, Oslo
19:00		BBC Report		Attendance: 14,137; Referee: Martin Hansson (Sweden)

30 May 2004 Friendly	Wales	1–0	Canada	Racecourse Ground, Wrexham
14:30 BST	Paul Parry 21'	BBC Report		Attendance: 10,805; Referee: Paul McKeon (Rep. of Ireland)

18 August 2004 Friendly	Latvia	0–2	Wales	Skonto Stadium, Riga
20:00		BBC Report	80' John Hartson; 89' Craig Bellamy	Attendance: 10,000; Referee: Ivan Ivanov (Bulgaria)

4 September 2004 2006 World Cup qual.	Azerbaijan	1–1	Wales	Tofiq Bahramov Stadium, Baku
21:00	Rashad Farhad Sadygov 55'	BBC Report	47' Gary Speed	Attendance: 8,000; Referee: Edo Trivković (Croatia)

8 September 2004 2006 World Cup qual.	Wales	2–2	Northern Ireland	Millennium Stadium, Cardiff
20:00 BST	John Hartson 32'; Robert Earnshaw 74'	BBC Report	10' Jeff Whitley; 21' David Healy	Attendance: 63,500; Referee: Domenico Messina (Italy)

9 October 2004 2006 World Cup qual.	England	2–0	Wales	Old Trafford, Manchester
15:00 BST	Lampard 4'; Beckham 76'	BBC Report		Attendance: 65,224; Referee: Terje Hauge (Norway)

13 October 2004 2006 World Cup qual.	Wales	2–3	Poland	Millennium Stadium, Cardiff
20:00 BST	Earnshaw 56'; Hartson 90'	BBC Report	72' Frankowski; 81' Żurawski; 85' Krzynówek	Attendance: 56,685; Referee: Alain Sars (France)

=== 2005 ===
9 February 2005 Friendly	Wales	2–0	Hungary	Millennium Stadium, Cardiff
20:00 GMT	Bellamy 68', 80'	BBC Report		Attendance: 16,672; Referee: Charlie Richmond (Scotland)

26 February 2005 2006 World Cup qual.	Wales	0–2	Austria	Millennium Stadium, Cardiff
15:00 GMT		BBC Report	81' Vastić; 85' Stranzl	Attendance: 47,760; Referee: Paul Allaerts (Belgium)

30 March 2005 2006 World Cup qual.	Austria	1–0	Wales	Ernst-Happel-Stadion, Vienna
20:30	Aufhauser 87'	BBC Report		Attendance: 29,500; Referee: Manuel Mejuto González (Spain)

17 August 2005 Friendly	Wales	0–0	Slovenia	Liberty Stadium, Swansea
19:30 BST		BBC Report		Attendance: 11,087; Referee: Declan Hanney (Rep. of Ireland)

3 September 2005 2006 World Cup qual.	Wales	0–1	England	Millennium Stadium, Cardiff
15:00 BST		BBC Report	54' J. Cole	Attendance: 70,715; Referee: Valentin Ivanov (Russia)

7 September 2005 2006 World Cup qual.	Poland	1–0	Wales	Polish Army Stadium, Warsaw
20:30	Żurawski 52'	BBC Report		Attendance: 13,500; Referee: Claus Bo Larsen (Denmark)

8 October 2005 2006 World Cup qual.	Northern Ireland	2–3	Wales	Windsor Park, Belfast
14:00 BST	Gillespie 47'; Davis 50'	BBC Report	27' S. Davies; 37' Robinson; 81' Giggs	Attendance: 13,451; Referee: Ruud Bossen (Netherlands)

12 October 2005 2006 World Cup qual.	Wales	2–0	Azerbaijan	Millennium Stadium, Cardiff
20:00 BST	Giggs 3', 51'	BBC Report		Attendance: 32,628; Referee: Martin Hansson (Sweden)

16 November 2005 Friendly	Cyprus	1–0	Wales	Tsirion Stadium, Limassol
21:00	Georgallides 42'	BBC Report		Attendance: 1,000; Referee: Heim Jacov (Israel)

=== 2006 ===
1 March 2006 Friendly	Wales	0–0	Paraguay	Millennium Stadium, Cardiff
20:00 GMT		BBC Report		Attendance: 12,324; Referee: Dougie McDonald (Scotland)

27 May 2006 Friendly	Trinidad and Tobago	1–2	Wales	Stadion Graz-Liebenau, Graz
18:15	John 32'	BBC Report	Earnshaw 38', 87'	Attendance: 8,100; Referee: Stefan Messner (Austria)

15 August 2006 Friendly	Wales	0–0	Bulgaria	Liberty Stadium, Swansea
19:45 BST		BBC Report		Attendance: 8,200; Referee: Joseph Attard (Malta)

2 September 2006 Euro 2008 qual.	Czech Republic	2–1	Wales	Na Stínadlech, Teplice
20:15	Lafata 76', 89'	BBC Report	Jiránek 85' (o.g.)	Attendance: 16,204; Referee: Jonas Eriksson (Sweden)

5 September 2006 Friendly	Brazil	2–0	Wales	White Hart Lane, London
20:15 BST	Marcelo 61'; Vágner Love 74'	BBC Report		Attendance: 22,008; Referee: Mike Riley (England)

7 October 2006 Euro 2008 qual.	Wales	1–5	Slovakia	Millennium Stadium, Cardiff
15:00 BST	Bale 37'	BBC Report	Švento 14'; Mintál 32', 38'; Karhan 51'; Vittek 59'	Attendance: 28,493; Referee: Dick van Egmond (Netherlands)

11 October 2006 Euro 2008 qual.	Wales	3–1	Cyprus	Millennium Stadium, Cardiff
20:00 BST	Koumas 33'; Earnshaw 39'; Bellamy 72'	BBC Report	Okkas 83'	Attendance: 20,456; Referee: Jacek Granat (Poland)

14 November 2006 Friendly	Wales	4–0	Liechtenstein	Racecourse Ground, Wrexham
19:45 GMT	Koumas 8', 14'; Bellamy 77'; Llewellyn 90'	BBC Report		Attendance: 8,752; Referee: Luc Wilmes (Luxembourg)

=== 2007 ===
6 February 2007 Friendly	Northern Ireland	0–0	Wales	Windsor Park, Belfast
19:45		BBC Report		Attendance: 8,752; Referee: Charlie Richmond (Scotland)

24 March 2007 Euro 2008 qual.	Republic of Ireland	1–0	Wales	Croke Park, Dublin
15:00 GMT	Ireland 39'	BBC Report		Attendance: 72,539; Referee: Terje Hauge (Norway)

28 March 2007 Euro 2008 qual.	Wales	3–0	San Marino	Millennium Stadium, Cardiff
20:00 BST	Giggs 3'; Bale 20'; Koumas 63' (pen.)	BBC Report		Attendance: 18,752; Referee: Ararat Tshagharyan (Armenia)

26 May 2007 Friendly	Wales	2–2	New Zealand	Racecourse Ground, Wrexham
15:00 BST	Bellamy 18', 38'	BBC Report	Smeltz 2', 24'	Attendance: 7,819; Referee: Tommy Skjerven (Norway)

2 June 2007 Euro 2008 qual.	Wales	0–0	Czech Republic	Millennium Stadium, Cardiff
15:00 BST		BBC Report		Attendance: 30,714; Referee: Paul Allaerts (Belgium)

22 August 2007 Friendly	Bulgaria	0–1	Wales	Lazur Stadium, Burgas
20:00		BBC Report	Eastwood 45'	Attendance: 13,000; Referee: Michalis Germanakos (Greece)

8 September 2007 Euro 2008 qual.	Wales	0–2	Germany	Millennium Stadium, Cardiff
19:30 BST		BBC Report	Klose 5', 60'	Attendance: 25,000; Referee: Manuel Mejuto González (Spain)

12 September 2007 Euro 2008 qual.	Slovakia	2–5	Wales	Štadión Antona Malatinského, Trnava
18:30	Mintál 12', 57'	BBC Report	Eastwood 22'; Bellamy 34', 41'; Ďurica 78' (o.g.); S. Davies 90'	Attendance: 5,486; Referee: Laurent Duhamel (France)

13 October 2007 Euro 2008 qual.	Cyprus	3–1	Wales	Neo GSP Stadium, Nicosia
19:15	Okkas 59', 68'; Charalambides 79'	BBC Report	Collins 21'	Attendance: 8,500; Referee: Carlo Bertolini (Switzerland)

17 October 2007 Euro 2008 qual.	San Marino	1–2	Wales	Stadio Olimpico, Serravalle
20:15	Selva 73'	BBC Report	Earnshaw 13'; Ledley 36'	Attendance: 1,182; Referee: Anthony Zammit (Malta)

17 November 2007 Euro 2008 qual.	Wales	2–2	Republic of Ireland	Millennium Stadium, Cardiff
15:00 GMT	Koumas 23', 89' (pen.)	BBC Report	Keane 31'; Doyle 60'	Attendance: 24,619; Referee: Oleh Oriekhov (Ukraine)

21 November 2007 Euro 2008 qual.	Germany	0–0	Wales	Commerzbank-Arena, Frankfurt
15:00		BBC Report		Attendance: 49,252; Referee: Cristian Balaj (Romania)

=== 2008 ===
6 February 2008 Friendly	Wales	3–0	Norway	Racecourse Ground, Wrexham
19:45 GMT	Fletcher 15'; Koumas 62', 89'	BBC Report		Attendance: 7,553; Referee: Dave McKeon (Rep. of Ireland)

26 March 2008 Friendly	Luxembourg	0–2	Wales	Stade Josy Barthel, Luxembourg City
20:15		BBC Report	Eastwood 37', 46'	Attendance: 1,800; Referee: Björn Kuipers (Netherlands)

28 May 2008 Friendly	Iceland	0–1	Wales	Laugardalsvollur, Reykjavík
19:45		BBC Report	Evans 44'	Attendance: 5,322; Referee: Adrian McCourt (Northern Ireland)

1 June 2008 Friendly	Netherlands	2–0	Wales	Feijenoord Stadium, Rotterdam
19:45	Robben 34'; Sneijder 54'	BBC Report		Attendance: 49,000; Referee: Felix Brych (Germany)

20 August 2008 Friendly	Wales	1–2	Georgia	Liberty Stadium, Swansea
20:05 BST	Koumas 16'	BBC Report	Kenia 66'; Gotsiridze 90'	Attendance: 6,435; Referee: Matej Jug (Slovenia)

6 September 2008 2010 World Cup qual.	Wales	1–0	Azerbaijan	Millennium Stadium, Cardiff
15:00 BST	Vokes 83'	BBC Report		Attendance: 17,106; Referee: Aleksandar Stavrev (Macedonia)

10 September 2008 2010 World Cup qual.	Russia	2–1	Wales	Lokomotiv Stadium, Moscow
16:00	Pavlyuchenko 22' (pen.); Pogrebnyak 81'	BBC Report	Ledley 67'	Attendance: 28,000; Referee: Damir Skomina (Slovenia)

11 October 2008 2010 World Cup qual.	Wales	2–0	Liechtenstein	Millennium Stadium, Cardiff
17:30 BST	Edwards 42'; Frick 80' (o.g.)	BBC Report		Attendance: 13,356; Referee: Thomas Vejlgaard (Denmark)

15 October 2008 2010 World Cup qual.	Germany	1–0	Wales	Borussia-Park, Mönchengladbach
19:45	Trochowski 72'	BBC Report		Attendance: 44,500; Referee: Laurent Duhamel (France)

19 November 2008 Friendly	Denmark	0–1	Wales	Brøndby Stadium, Brøndby
19:15		BBC Report	Bellamy 77'	Attendance: 10,271; Referee: Michael Weiner (Germany)

=== 2009 ===
11 February 2009 Friendly	Poland	1–0	Wales	Estádio Municipal, Vila Real de Santo António
17:15	Guerreiro 80'	BBC Report		Attendance: 487; Referee: Bruno Paixão (Portugal)

28 March 2009 2010 World Cup qual.	Wales	0–2	Finland	Millennium Stadium, Cardiff
15:00 BST		BBC Report	Johansson 42'; Kuqi 90+1'	Attendance: 22,604; Referee: Eduardo Iturralde González (Spain)

1 April 2009 2010 World Cup qual.	Wales	0–2	Germany	Millennium Stadium, Cardiff
19:45 BST		BBC Report	Ballack 11'; A. Williams 48' (o.g.)	Attendance: 26,064; Referee: Terje Hauge (Norway)

29 May 2009 Friendly	Wales	1–0	Estonia	Parc y Scarlets, Llanelli
19:30 BST	Earnshaw 26' (pen.)	BBC Report		Attendance: 4,071; Referee: Magnus Thorisson (Iceland)

6 June 2009 2010 World Cup qual.	Azerbaijan	0–1	Wales	Tofiq Bahramov Stadium, Baku
16:00		BBC Report	Edwards 42'	Attendance: 26,728; Referee: Markus Strombergsson (Sweden)

12 August 2009 Friendly	Montenegro	2–1	Wales	Podgorica City Stadium, Podgorica
19:30	Jovetić 31' (pen.); Dalović 45'	BBC Report	Vokes 47'	Attendance: 5,000; Referee: Milorad Mažić (Serbia)

9 September 2009 2010 World Cup qual.	Wales	1–3	Russia	Millennium Stadium, Cardiff
19:45 BST	Collins 53'	BBC Report	Semshov 36'; Ignashevich 71'; Pavlyuchenko 90+1'	Attendance: 14,505; Referee: Jorge Sousa (Portugal)

10 October 2009 2010 World Cup qual.	Finland	2–1	Wales	Helsinki Olympic Stadium, Helsinki
15:00	Porokara 5'; Moisander 77'	BBC Report	Bellamy 17'	Attendance: 14,000; Referee: Milorad Mažić (Serbia)

14 October 2009 2010 World Cup qual.	Liechtenstein	0–2	Wales	Rheinpark Stadion, Vaduz
19:00		BBC Report	16' Vaughan; 80' Ramsey	Attendance: 1,858; Referee: Sten Kaldma (Estonia)

14 November 2009 Friendly	Wales	3–0	Scotland	Cardiff City Stadium, Cardiff
15:00 GMT	Edwards 17'; Church 32'; Ramsey 35'	BBC Report		Attendance: 13,844; Referee: Cyril Zimmermann (Switzerland)

== 2010s ==
=== 2010 ===
3 March 2010 Friendly	Wales	0–1	Sweden	Liberty Stadium, Swansea
19:45 GMT		BBC Report	Elmander 44'	Attendance: 8,258; Referee: Alan Black (Northern Ireland)

23 May 2010 Friendly	Croatia	2–0	Wales	Stadion Gradski vrt, Osijek
18:00	Rakitić 44'; Gabrić 82'	BBC Report		Attendance: 12,000; Referee: Slavko Vinčić (Slovenia)

11 August 2010 Friendly	Wales	5–1	Luxembourg	Parc y Scarlets, Llanelli
19:45 BST	Cotterill 35'; Ledley 48' (pen.); King 55'; Williams 78'; Bellamy 82'	BBC Report	Kitenge 44'	Attendance: 4,504; Referee: Mattias Gestranius (Finland)

3 September 2010 Euro 2012 qual.	Montenegro	1–0	Wales	Podgorica City Stadium, Podgorica
19:30	Vučinić 30'	BBC Report		Attendance: 7,442; Referee: Anastassios Kakos (Greece)

8 October 2010 Euro 2012 qual.	Wales	0–1	Bulgaria	Cardiff City Stadium, Cardiff
19:30 BST		BBC Report	Popov 48'	Attendance: 14,061; Referee: Jonas Eriksson (Sweden)

12 October 2010 Euro 2012 qual.	Switzerland	4–1	Wales	St. Jakob-Park, Basel
20:30 CEST	Stocker 9', 89'; Streller 22'; Inler 82' (pen.)		Bale 13'	Attendance: 26,000; Referee: Alain Hamer (Luxembourg)

=== 2011 ===
8 February 2011 2011 Nations Cup	Republic of Ireland	3–0	Wales	Aviva Stadium, Dublin
19:45 GMT (UTC)	Gibson 60'; Duff 67'; Fahey 83'	BBC Report		Attendance: 19,783; Referee: Mark Courtney (Northern Ireland)

26 March 2011 Euro 2012 qual.	Wales	0–2	England	Millennium Stadium, Cardiff
15:00 GMT (UTC)		BBC Report	Lampard 7' (pen.); Bent 14'	Attendance: 68,959; Referee: Olegário Benquerença (Portugal)

25 May 2011 2011 Nations Cup	Wales	1–3	Scotland	Aviva Stadium, Dublin
19:45 BST (UTC+01)	Earnshaw 36'	BBC Report	Morrison 55'; Miller 63'; Berra 70'	Attendance: 6,036; Referee: Raymond Crangle (Northern Ireland)

27 May 2011 2011 Nations Cup	Wales	2–0	Northern Ireland	Aviva Stadium, Dublin
19:45 BST (UTC+01)	Ramsey 36'; Earnshaw 69'	BBC Report		Attendance: 529; Referee: Alan Kelly (Republic of Ireland)

10 August 2011 Friendly	Wales	1–2	Australia	Cardiff City Stadium, Cardiff
19:45 BST (UTC+01)	Blake 38'	BBC Report	Cahill 44'; Kruse 60'	Attendance: 6,378; Referee: Kristo Tohver (Estonia)

2 September 2011 Euro 2012 qual.	Wales	2–1	Montenegro	Cardiff City Stadium, Cardiff
19:45 BST (UTC+01)	Morison 29'; Ramsey 50'	BBC Report	Jovetić 71'	Attendance: 8,194; Referee: Luca Banti (Italy)

6 September 2011 Euro 2012 qual.	England	1–0	Wales	Wembley Stadium, London
19:45 BST (UTC+01)	Young 35'	BBC Report		Attendance: 77,128; Referee: Robert Schörgenhofer (Austria)

7 October 2011 Euro 2012 qual.	Wales	2–0	Switzerland	Liberty Stadium, Swansea
19:45 BST (UTC+01)	Ramsey 60' (pen.); Bale 71'	BBC Report		Attendance: 12,317; Referee: Björn Kuipers (Netherlands)

11 October 2011 Euro 2012 qual.	Bulgaria	0–1	Wales	Vasil Levski National Stadium, Sofia
19:45		BBC Report	Bale 45'	Attendance: 1,672; Referee: Pawel Gil (Poland)

12 November 2011 Friendly	Wales	4–1	Norway	Cardiff City Stadium, Cardiff
15:00 GMT (UTC)	Bale 11'; Bellamy 16'; Vokes 88', 89'	BBC Report	Huseklepp 61'	Attendance: 12,637; Referee: Gerhard Grobelnik (Austria)

=== 2012 ===
29 February 2012 Friendly	Wales	0–1	Costa Rica	Cardiff City Stadium, Cardiff
19:45		Report	Campbell 7'	Attendance: 23,193; Referee: Howard Webb (England)

27 May 2012 Friendly	Mexico	2–0	Wales	MetLife Stadium, New York City
20:00	De Nigris 43', 89'	Report		Attendance: 35,518; Referee: Ricardo Salazar (USA)

15 August 2012 Friendly	Wales	0–2	Bosnia and Herzegovina	Parc y Scarlets, Llanelli
19:45		Report	Ibišević 21'; Stevanović 54'	Attendance: 6,253; Referee: Marco Borg (Malta)

7 September 2012 2014 World Cup qual.	Wales	0–2	Belgium	Cardiff City Stadium, Cardiff
19:45		Report	Kompany 42'; Vertonghen 82'	Attendance: 20,156; Referee: Stefan Johannesson (Sweden)

11 September 2012 2014 World Cup qual.	Serbia	6–1	Wales	Karađorđe Stadium, Novi Sad
19:30	Kolarov 16'; Tošić 24'; Đuričić 39'; Tadić 55'; Ivanović 89'; Sulejmani 80'	Report	Bale 31'	Attendance: 10,660; Referee: Duarte Gomes (Portugal)

12 October 2012 2014 World Cup qual.	Wales	2–1	Scotland	Cardiff City Stadium, Cardiff
19:45	Bale 81' (pen.), 89'	Report	Morrison 27'	Attendance: 23,249; Referee: Florian Meyer (Germany)

16 October 2012 2014 World Cup qual.	Croatia	2–0	Wales	Stadion Gradski vrt, Osijek
19:00	Mandžukić 27'; Eduardo 58'	Report		Referee: Alexandru Tudor (Romania)

=== 2013 ===
6 February 2013 Friendly	Wales	2–1	Austria	Liberty Stadium, Swansea
19:45 GMT (UTC)	Bale 21'; Vokes 52'	BBC Report	Janko 75'	Attendance: 8,202; Referee: Menashe Masiah (Israel)

22 March 2013 2014 World Cup qual.	Scotland	1–2	Wales	Hampden Park, Glasgow
20:00 GMT (UTC)	Hanley 45+2'	FIFA Report	Ramsey 72' (pen.); Robson-Kanu 74'	Attendance: 39,365; Referee: Antony Gautier (France)

26 March 2013 2014 World Cup qual.	Wales	1–2	Croatia	Liberty Stadium, Swansea
19:45 GMT (UTC)	Bale 21' (pen.)	FIFA Report	Lovren 77'; Eduardo 87'	Attendance: 12,534; Referee: Luca Banti (Italy)

14 August 2013 Friendly	Wales	0–0	Republic of Ireland	Cardiff City Stadium, Cardiff
19:45 BST (UTC+01)		BBC Report		Attendance: 20,000; Referee: Pavel Královec (Czech Republic)

6 September 2013 2014 World Cup qual.	Macedonia	2–1	Wales	Philip II Arena, Skopje
19:00 CEST (UTC+02)	Tričkovski 20', 80'	BBC Report	Ramsey 39' (pen.)	Attendance: 13000; Referee: Sascha Kever (Switzerland)

10 September 2013 2014 World Cup qual.	Wales	0–3	Serbia	Cardiff City Stadium, Cardiff
19:45 BST (UTC+01)		BBC Report	Đorđević 9'; Kolarov 38'; Marković 55'	Attendance: 10,923; Referee: Szymon Marciniak (Poland)

11 October 2013 2014 World Cup qual.	Wales	1–0	Macedonia	Cardiff City Stadium, Cardiff
19:45 BST (UTC+01)	Church 67'	BBC Report; FIFA Report		Attendance: 11,257; Referee: Suren Baliyan (Armenia)

15 October 2013 2014 World Cup qual.	Belgium	1–1	Wales	King Baudouin Stadium, Brussels
20:00 CEST (UTC+02)	De Bruyne 64'	BBC Report; FIFA Report	Bellamy (yellow card) 80'; Ramsey 88'	Attendance: 45,401; Referee: Sergei Karasev (Russia)

16 November 2013 Friendly	Wales	1–1	Finland	Cardiff City Stadium, Cardiff
18:00 GMT (UTC)	King 58', (yellow card) 77'	BBC Report	Riski 90+1'	Attendance: 11,809; Referee: Sébastien Delferière (Belgium)

=== 2014 ===
5 March 2014 Friendly	Wales	3–1	Iceland	Cardiff City Stadium, Cardiff
19:45 GMT (UTC)	Collins 12'; Vokes 63'; Bale 70'	BBC Report	Williams 26' (o.g.)	Attendance: 13,290; Referee: Elmar Saar, Estonia

4 June 2014 Friendly	Netherlands	2–0	Wales	Amsterdam Arena, Amsterdam, Netherlands
20:30 CEST (UTC+02)	Robben 32'; Lens 76'	BBC Report		Attendance: 51,000; Referee: Bülent Yildirim, Turkey

9 September 2014 Euro 2016 qual.	Andorra	1–2	Wales	Estadi Nacional, Andorra la Vella
19:45 CEST (UTC+02)	Lima 6' (pen.)	UEFA Report	Bale 22', 81'	Attendance: 3,300; Referee: Slavko Vinčić, Slovenia

10 October 2014 Euro 2016 qual.	Wales	0–0	Bosnia and Herzegovina	Cardiff City Stadium, Cardiff
19:45 BST (UTC+01)		BBC Report		Attendance: 30,741; Referee: Vladislav Bezborodov, Russia

13 October 2014 Euro 2016 qual.	Wales	2–1	Cyprus	Cardiff City Stadium, Cardiff
19:45 BST (UTC+01)	Cotterill 13'; Robson-Kanu 23'	BBC Report	Laban 36'	Attendance: 21,273; Referee: Manuel Gräfe, Germany

16 November 2014 Euro 2016 qual.	Belgium	0–0	Wales	King Baudouin Stadium, Brussels, Belgium
18:00 CET (UTC+01)		BBC Report		Attendance: 41,535; Referee: Pavel Královec, Czech Republic

=== 2015 ===
28 March 2015 Euro 2016 qual.	Israel	0–3	Wales	Sammy Ofer Stadium, Haifa, Israel
20:00 IDT (UTC+3)		BBC Report	Ramsey 45'; Bale 50', 77'	Attendance: 30,200; Referee: Milorad Mažić (Serbia)

12 June 2015 Euro 2016 qual.	Wales	1–0	Belgium	Cardiff City Stadium, Cardiff
19:45 BST (UTC+01)	Bale 25'	BBC Report		Attendance: 33,280; Referee: Felix Brych (Germany)

3 September 2015 Euro 2016 qual.	Cyprus	0–1	Wales	GSP Stadium, Nicosia, Cyprus
21:45 EEST (UTC+3)		BBC Report	Bale 82'	Attendance: 14,992; Referee: Szymon Marciniak (Poland)

6 September 2015 Euro 2016 qual.	Wales	0–0	Israel	Cardiff City Stadium, Cardiff
17:00 BST (UTC+01)		BBC Report		Attendance: 32,653; Referee: Ivan Bebek (Croatia)

10 October 2015 Euro 2016 qual.	Bosnia and Herzegovina	2–0	Wales	Bilino Polje, Zenica, Bosnia and Herzegovina
20:45 CEST (UTC+02)	Đurić 71'; Ibišević 90'	BBC Report		Attendance: 15,600; Referee: Alberto Undiano Mallenco (Spain)

13 October 2015 Euro 2016 qual.	Wales	2–0	Andorra	Cardiff City Stadium, Cardiff
19:45 BST (UTC+01)	Ramsey 50'; Bale 86'	BBC Report		Attendance: 33,000; Referee: Kevin Blom (Netherlands)

13 November 2015 Friendly	Wales	2–3	Netherlands	Cardiff City Stadium, Cardiff
19:45 GMT (UTC)	Ledley 45'; Huws 70'	BBC Report	Dost 32'; Robben 54', 81'	Attendance: 25,699; Referee: Benoît Bastien (France)

=== 2016 ===
24 March 2016 Friendly	Wales	1–1	Northern Ireland	Cardiff City Stadium, Cardiff
19:45 GMT	Church 89' (pen.)	BBC Report	Cathcart 60'	Attendance: 21,855; Referee: Steven McLean (Scotland)

28 March 2016 Friendly	Ukraine	1–0	Wales	Olympic Stadium, Kyiv, Ukraine
21:00 EEST (UTC+03)	Yarmolenko 28'	BBC Report		Attendance: 20,000; Referee: Serdar Gözübüyük (Netherlands)

5 June 2016 Friendly	Sweden	3–0	Wales	Friends Arena, Stockholm, Sweden
16:00 UTC+2	Forsberg 40'; Lustig 57'; Guidetti 87'	BBC Report; Swedish Report		Attendance: 37,942; Referee: Tobias Welz (Germany)

11 June 2016 Euro 2016 Group B	Wales	2–1	Slovakia	Nouveau Stade de Bordeaux, Bordeaux
18:00 CEST (UTC+02)	Bale 10'; Robson-Kanu 81'	UEFA Report; BBC Report	Duda 61'	Attendance: 37,831; Referee: Svein Oddvar Moen (Norway)

16 June 2016 Euro 2016 Group B	England	2–1	Wales	Stade Bollaert-Delelis, Lens
15:00 CEST (UTC+02)	Vardy 56'; Sturridge 90+2'	UEFA Report; BBC Report	Bale 42'	Attendance: 34,033; Referee: Felix Brych (Germany)

20 June 2016 Euro 2016 Group B	Russia	0–3	Wales	Stadium Municipal, Toulouse
21:00 CEST (UTC+02)		UEFA Report; BBC Report	Ramsey 11'; Taylor 20'; Bale 67'	Attendance: 28,840; Referee: Jonas Eriksson (Sweden)

25 June 2016 Euro 2016 round of 16	Wales	1–0	Northern Ireland	Parc de Princes, Paris
18:00 CEST (UTC+02)	McAuley 75' (o.g.)	UEFA Report; BBC Report		Attendance: 44,342; Referee: Martin Atkinson (England)

1 July 2016 Euro 2016 quarter-final	Wales	3–1	Belgium	Stade Pierre-Mauroy, Villeneuve-d'Ascq
21:00 CEST (UTC+02)	A. Williams 30'; Robson-Kanu 55'; Vokes 85'	UEFA Report; BBC Report	Nainggolan 13'	Attendance: 45,936; Referee: Damir Skomina (Slovenia)

6 July 2016 Euro 2016 semi-final	Portugal	2–0	Wales	Parc Olympique Lyonnais, Décines-Charpieu
21:00 CEST (UTC+02)	Ronaldo 50'; Nani 53'	UEFA Report; BBC Report		Attendance: 55,679; Referee: Jonas Eriksson (Sweden)

5 September 2016 2018 World Cup qual.	Wales	4–0	Moldova	Cardiff City Stadium, Cardiff
19:45 BST	Vokes 38'; Allen 44'; Bale 50', 90+5' (pen.)	BBC Report		Attendance: 31,731; Referee: Liran Liany (Israel)

6 October 2016 2018 World Cup qual.	Austria	2–2	Wales	Ernst-Happel-Stadion, Vienna, Austria
19:45 CEST (UTC+02)	Arnautović 28', 48'	BBC Report; FIFA Report	Allen 22'; Wimmer 45+1' (o.g.)	Attendance: 44,200; Referee: Cüneyt Çakir Turkey

9 October 2016 2018 World Cup qual.	Wales	1–1	Georgia	Cardiff City Stadium, Cardiff
17:00 BST	Bale 10'	BBC Report	Okriashvili 57'	Attendance: 32,652; Referee: Paolo Mazzoleni (Italy)

12 November 2016 2018 World Cup qual.	Wales	1–1	Serbia	Cardiff City Stadium, Cardiff
19:45 GMT	Bale 30'	BBC Report	Mitrović 85'	Attendance: 32,879; Referee: Alberto Undiano Mallenco (Spain)

=== 2017 ===
24 March 2017 2018 World Cup qual.	Republic of Ireland	0–0	Wales	Aviva Stadium, Dublin, Republic of Ireland
19:45 GMT		BBC Report		Attendance: 49,989; Referee: Nicola Rizzoli (Italy)

11 June 2017 2018 World Cup qual.	Serbia	1–1	Wales	Stadion Rajko Mitić, Belgrade, Serbia
20:45 CEST (UTC+02)	Mitrović 73'	BBC Report	Ramsey 35' (pen.)	Attendance: 46,673; Referee: Jorge Sousa (Portugal)

2 September 2017 2018 World Cup qual.	Wales	1–0	Austria	Cardiff City Stadium, Cardiff
19:45 BST	Woodburn 74'	BBC Report		Attendance: 32,633; Referee: Ovidiu Hațegan (Romania)

5 September 2017 2018 World Cup qual.	Moldova	0–2	Wales	Zimbru Stadium, Chișinău, Moldova
20:45 EEST (UTC+03)		BBC Report	Robson-Kanu 80'; Ramsey 90+3'	Attendance: 10,272; Referee: Paweł Raczkowski (Poland)

6 October 2017 2018 World Cup qual.	Georgia	0–1	Wales	Boris Paichadze Dinamo Arena, Tbilisi, Georgia
20:00 GET UTC+4		BBC Report	Lawrence 49'	Attendance: 22,290; Referee: Jesús Gil Manzano (Spain)

9 October 2017 2018 World Cup qual.	Wales	0–1	Republic of Ireland	Cardiff City Stadium, Cardiff
19:45 BST		BBC Report	McLean 57'	Attendance: 32,711; Referee: Damir Skomina (Slovenia)

10 November 2017 Friendly	France	2–0	Wales	Stade de France, Saint-Denis
21:00 CET (UTC+01)	Griezmann 18'; Giroud 71'	BBC Report		Attendance: 60,000; Referee: Jorge Sousa (Portugal)

14 November 2017 Friendly	Wales	1–1	Panama	Cardiff City Stadium, Cardiff
19:45 GMT	Lawrence 49'	BBC Report	Cooper 90+3'	Attendance: 13,737; Referee: Bart Vertenten (Belgium)

=== 2018 ===
22 March 2018 2018 China Cup semi-final	China	0–6	Wales	Guangxi Sports Centre Stadium, Nanning, China
19:35 CST (UTC+8)		BBC Report	Bale 2', 21', 62'; Vokes 38', 58'; Wilson 45'	Attendance: 36,533; Referee: Mohd Amirul Izwan Yaacob (Malaysia)

26 March 2018 2018 China Cup Final	Wales	0–1	Uruguay	Guangxi S.C. Stadium, Nanning, China
19:35 CST (UTC+8)		BBC Report	Cavani 49'	Attendance: 41,016; Referee: Salman Ahmad Flahi (Qatar)

29 May 2018 Friendly	Mexico	0–0	Wales	Rose Bowl, Pasadena, California, United States
18:00 PDT (UTC−7)		BBC Report		Attendance: 82,345; Referee: Armando Villarreal (United States)

6 September 2018 UEFA Nations League B	Wales	4–1	Republic of Ireland	Cardiff City Stadium, Cardiff
19:45 BST (UTC+1)	Lawrence 6'; Bale 18'; Ramsey 37'; Roberts 55'	BBC Report	Williams 66'	Attendance: 25,657; Referee: Clément Turpin (France)

9 September 2018 UEFA Nations League B	Denmark	2–0	Wales	Aarhus Idrætspark, Aarhus, Denmark
18:00 CEST (UTC+2)	Eriksen 32', 63' (pen.)	Report (UEFA); BBC Report		Attendance: 17,506; Referee: Deniz Aytekin (Germany)

11 October 2018 Friendly	Wales	1–4	Spain	Millennium Stadium, Cardiff
19:45 BST (UTC+1)	Vokes 89'	BBC Report; Sky Report	Alcácer 8', 29'; Ramos 19'; Bartra 74'	Attendance: 50,232; Referee: Anthony Taylor (England)

16 October 2018 UEFA Nations League B	Republic of Ireland	0–1	Wales	Aviva Stadium, Dublin, Republic of Ireland
19:45 BST (UTC+1)		Report (UEFA); BBC Report	Wilson 58'	Attendance: 38,321; Referee: Björn Kuipers (Netherlands)

16 November 2018 UEFA Nations League B	Wales	1–2	Denmark	Cardiff City Stadium, Cardiff
19:45 GMT (UTC±0)	Bale 89'	Report (UEFA); BBC Report	N. Jørgensen 42'; Braithwaite 88'	Attendance: 32,354; Referee: Ivan Kružliak (Slovakia)

20 November 2018 Friendly	Albania	1–0	Wales	Elbasan Arena, Elbasan, Albania
19:45 CET (UTC+1)	Balaj 58' (pen.)	BBC Report		Attendance: 3,000; Referee: Dejan Jakimovski (North Macedonia)

=== 2019 ===
20 March 2019 Friendly	Wales	1–0	Trinidad and Tobago	Racecourse Ground, Wrexham
19:45 GMT	Woodburn 90+2'	BBC Report		Attendance: 10,326; Referee: Tim Marshall (Northern Ireland)

24 March 2019 Euro 2020 qual.	Wales	1–0	Slovakia	Cardiff City Stadium, Cardiff
14:00 GMT	James 5'	BBC Report		Attendance: 31,617; Referee: Felix Zwayer (Germany)

8 June 2019 Euro 2020 qual.	Croatia	2–1	Wales	Stadion Gradski vrt, Osijek, Croatia
15:00 CEST (UTC+2)	J. Lawrence 17' (o.g.); Perišić 48'	BBC Report	Brooks 77'	Attendance: 17,061; Referee: István Kovács (Romania)

11 June 2019 Euro 2020 qual.	Hungary	1–0	Wales	Groupama Arena, Budapest, Hungary
20:45 CEST (UTC+2)	Pátkai 80'	BBC Report		Attendance: 18,350; Referee: Matej Jug (Slovenia)

6 September 2019 Euro 2020 qual.	Wales	2–1	Azerbaijan	Cardiff City Stadium, Cardiff
19:45 BST (UTC+1)	Pashayev 26' (o.g.); Bale 84'	BBC Report	Emreli 59'	Attendance: 28,385; Referee: Trustin Farrugia Cann (Malta)

9 September 2019 Friendly	Wales	1–0	Belarus	Cardiff City Stadium, Cardiff
19:45 BST (UTC+1)	James 17'	BBC Report		Attendance: 7,666; Referee: Willie Collum (Scotland)

10 October 2019 Euro 2020 qual.	Slovakia	1–1	Wales	Anton Malatinský Stadium, Trnava, Slovakia
20:45 CEST (UTC+2)	Kucka 53'	BBC Report	Moore 25'	Attendance: 18,071; Referee: Carlos del Cerro Grande (Spain)

13 October 2019 Euro 2020 qual.	Wales	1–1	Croatia	Cardiff City Stadium, Cardiff
19:45 BST (UTC+1)	Bale 45+3'	BBC Report	Vlašić 9'	Attendance: 31,745; Referee: Björn Kuipers (Netherlands)

16 November 2019 Euro 2020 qual.	Azerbaijan	0–2	Wales	Baku Olympic Stadium, Baku, Azerbaijan
21:00 AZT (UTC+4)		BBC Report	Moore 10'; Wilson 34'	Attendance: 8,622; Referee: Deniz Aytekin (Germany)

19 November 2019 Euro 2020 qual.	Wales	2–0	Hungary	Cardiff City Stadium, Cardiff
19:45 GMT	Ramsey 15', 47'	BBC Report		Attendance: 31,762; Referee: Ovidiu Hațegan (Romania)

== Head-to-head records ==
Opponent	Played	Won	Drawn	Lost	For	Against	Diff	Win %	Loss %
Andorra	2	2	0	0	4	1	3	100	0
Argentina	1	0	1	0	1	1	0	0	0
Armenia	2	0	2	0	2	2	0	0	0
Australia	1	0	0	1	1	2	−1	0	100
Austria	4	1	1	2	3	5	−2	25	50
Azerbaijan	8	7	1	0	15	2	+13	87.5	0
Basque Country	1	1	0	0	1	0	+1	100	0
Belgium	6	2	2	2	6	6	0	33.33	33.33
Bosnia and Herzegovina	4	0	2	2	2	6	−4	0	50
Belarus	1	0	0	1	1	0	+1	100	0
Brazil	2	0	0	2	0	5	−5	0	100
Bulgaria	4	2	1	1	2	1	+1	50	25
Canada	1	1	0	0	1	0	+1	100	0
China	1	1	0	0	6	0	+6	100	0
Costa Rica	1	0	0	1	0	1	−1	0	100
Croatia	4	0	1	3	3	7	−4	0	75
Cyprus	5	3	0	2	7	6	1	60	40
Czech Republic	3	0	2	1	1	2	−1	0	33.33
Denmark	3	1	0	2	3	6	−3	33.33	66.67
England	5	0	0	5	1	8	−7	0	100
Estonia	1	1	0	0	1	0	+1	100	0
Finland	6	1	2	3	6	8	−2	16.67	50
France	1	0	0	1	2	0	−2	0	100
Georgia	3	1	1	1	3	3	0	33.33	50
Germany	5	1	1	3	1	5	−4	20	60
Hungary	4	3	0	1	6	2	+4	75	25
Iceland	2	2	0	0	4	1	+3	100	0
Israel	2	1	1	0	3	0	+3	50	0
Italy	2	1	0	1	2	5	−3	50	50
Latvia	1	1	0	0	2	0	+2	100	0
Liechtenstein	3	3	0	0	8	0	+8	100	0
Luxembourg	2	2	0	0	7	1	+6	100	0
Macedonia	2	1	0	1	2	2	0	50	50
Mexico	2	0	1	1	0	2	−2	0	50
Moldova	2	2	0	0	6	0	+6	100	0
Montenegro	3	1	0	2	3	4	−1	33.33	66.67
Netherlands	3	0	0	3	2	7	−5	0	100
New Zealand	1	0	1	0	2	2	0	0	0
Northern Ireland	6	3	3	0	8	4	+4	50	0
Norway	5	2	2	1	10	5	+5	40	20
Panama	1	0	1	0	1	1	0	0	0
Paraguay	1	0	1	0	0	0	0	0	0
Poland	5	0	1	4	3	7	−4	0	80
Portugal	2	0	0	2	0	5	−5	0	100
Qatar	1	1	0	0	1	0	+1	100	0
Republic of Ireland	8	2	3	3	7	8	−1	25	37.5
Russia	5	1	1	3	5	6	−1	20	60
San Marino	2	2	0	0	3	1	+2	100	0
Scotland	4	3	0	1	10	4	+6	75	25
Serbia and Montenegro	2	0	0	2	2	4	−2	0	100
Serbia	4	0	2	2	3	11	−8	0	50
Slovakia	5	3	1	1	10	9	+1	60	20
Slovenia	1	0	1	0	0	0	0	0	0
Spain	1	0	0	1	1	4	−3	0	100
Sweden	3	1	0	2	2	4	−2	33.33	66.67
Trinidad and Tobago	2	2	0	0	3	1	+2	100	0
Ukraine	3	0	2	1	2	3	−1	0	33.33
United States	1	0	0	1	0	2	−2	0	100
Uruguay	1	0	0	1	0	1	−1	0	100
Total	165	63	39	63	184	175	+9	38.18	38.18

P – Played; W – Won; D – Drawn; L – Lost

== See also ==
- 2002 FIFA World Cup qualification
- 2006 FIFA World Cup qualification
- 2010 FIFA World Cup qualification
- 2014 FIFA World Cup qualification
- 2018 FIFA World Cup qualification
- UEFA Euro 2004 qualifying
- UEFA Euro 2008 qualifying
- UEFA Euro 2012 qualifying
- UEFA Euro 2016 qualifying
- Nations Cup (football)
