= 1921–22 Cardiff City F.C. season =

Welsh football club season

Cardiff City
1921–22 season
- Chairman: John Pritchard (until November 1921); Walter Emspall
- Manager: Fred Stewart
- Division One: 4th
- FA Cup: Fourth round
- Welsh Cup: Winners
- Top goalscorer: League: Jimmy Gill (20); All: Len Davies (30)
- Highest home attendance: 50,000 vs. Tottenham Hotspur (27 August 1921)
- Lowest home attendance: 15,000 vs. Sheffield United (26 April 1922)
- Average home league attendance: 27,500
Home colours

The 1921–22 season was the 21st season (Note: Cardiff City were founded in 1899 but missed the entrance date of the Cardiff & District League in their first year.) of competitive football played by Cardiff City F.C. and the team's first in the First Division of The Football League. Cardiff had won promotion the previous season by finishing as runners-up in the Second Division, becoming the first Welsh team to reach the top tier of English football.

Cardiff had a difficult start to the season, losing the first six matches of the campaign. They eventually saw results improve and finished in fourth place. The club entered the FA Cup in the first round and progressed to the fourth, before being defeated by Tottenham Hotspur after a replay. Cardiff went on to win the Welsh Cup for the third time in the club's history after defeating Ton Pentre 2–0 in the final, having scored seventeen goals and conceded only one during their cup run.

During the season, 31 players made at least one appearance for the club. Billy Grimshaw played in more games than any other player, featuring in 47 matches in all competitions. Len Davies finished the season as the side's highest goalscorer with 30 in all competitions, a new club record. His tally of seventeen in the First Division was three short of Jimmy Gill's total, but his fourteen in cup matches, including eight in four appearances in the Welsh Cup, saw him outscore his teammate. The highest attendance recorded at Ninian Park was 51,000 for the FA Cup fourth-round tie against Tottenham. The league fixture against Tottenham recorded an attendance of 50,000 although an extra 6,000–10,000 were estimated to have broken into the ground after turnstiles were closed. The average league attendance during the season was 27,500.

== Background and preseason ==
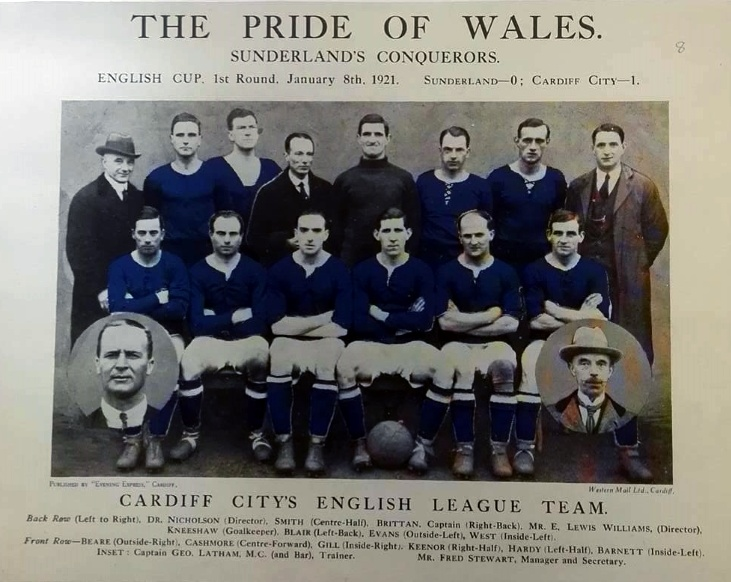
A postcard published by the Western Mail of the Cardiff team that reached the FA Cup semi-final the previous season

During the 1920–21 season, Cardiff City were elected into the Second Division of The Football League having spent the previous decade playing in the Southern Football League. In the side's first season in the Second Division, they finished as runners-up behind Birmingham on goal average, a tiebreak formula whereby a team's goals scored is divided by the number of goals conceded, after the two teams accumulated the same number of points. As a result, Cardiff won promotion to the First Division, becoming the first Welsh side to play in the top tier of English football. They also reached the semi-final of the FA Cup.

Manager Fred Stewart remained in charge of the first team for the tenth year. He made several additions to the squad, signing full-back Tommy Brown from New Brighton and forward Willie Page, the brother of Cardiff defender Jack Page, from Port Vale. Cardiff were investigated by The Football Association (FA) and the Football Association of Wales (FAW) over an illegal approach for Wolverhampton Wanderers defender Dickie Baugh Jr. The club was found guilty with Baugh having signed an agreement with an agent acting on behalf of Cardiff despite still being contracted to Wolves. Cardiff were fined £50 and Baugh £20. The agent involved was subsequently banned from all football grounds under the jurisdictions of either the FA or FAW. John Pritchard was elected chairman of the club ahead of the new season but left the role in November and was replaced by Walter Empsall.

Cardiff also made significant investments in the club's ground Ninian Park. A new pitch was laid using sea-washed turf which officials at the club labelled as "now being equal to the best in the country". The earthen embankments that enclosed the pitch were also built up to improve viewing for spectators. The latter work nearly resulted in disaster when the refuse being tipped by Cardiff Corporation caught alight and spread across the Grangetown side of the ground. The fire was doused, with the aid of hundreds of local supporters who had raced to the ground to offer help, and little damage was sustained. Having won promotion and reached the semi-final of the FA Cup, The Times expected Cardiff to adapt well to the higher tier.

== First Division ==
=== August–November ===
In Cardiff's first match in the First Division, they met FA Cup holders Tottenham Hotspur at Ninian Park. The game therefore became the first top-tier match in English football to be played in Wales and was described in The Times as "the most important event in their (Cardiff's) history". The fixture attracted a large crowd, and when 50,000 supporters had paid and been allowed into the ground officials attempted to close the gates. With thousands still queuing to gain entry, supporters broke through the gates and forced their way into the ground. Club officials estimated that between 6,000 and 10,000 people broke into the ground after the gates were initially closed. Cardiff started the season without influential defender Jimmy Blair who was recovering from a bout of pneumonia; Jack Page started the opening match in his place. Tottenham suffered a setback early in the game as Jimmy Seed picked up an injury, but proved too strong for Cardiff and scored the only goal of the game through Jimmy Banks from outside the penalty area. The excessive crowd numbers produced several unsavoury incidents which included fans taking over the scoreboard to use it a vantage point. This experience prompted the club to seek advice from local police on crowd control at future matches.

Defeat to Tottenham was the start of a difficult beginning in the First Division for the club. Defender Bert Smith became the first player to score for Cardiff in the division in the side's following match with a consolation goal during a 2–1 defeat to Aston Villa on 29 August. Cardiff met Tottenham in the reverse fixture five days later at their opposition's home ground but, having proven stubborn opposition for the more experienced side in the first meeting, they were soundly beaten after conceding three goals in the opening 30 minutes of the match. The game finished 4–1 to Tottenham with The Times describing victory for the London-based side as "a very easy matter". A 4–0 defeat in the reverse fixture against Aston Villa followed, prompting Stewart to make changes to his side ahead of back-to-back fixtures against Oldham Athletic. Blair returned to action having missed the first four matches and goalkeeper Herbert Kneeshaw was dropped in favour of Ben Davies. Billy Hardy, who had been ever present the previous season, was also left out due to injury along with forward George West. The changes yielded little reward as Cardiff lost both fixtures against Oldham, 1–0 at home, 2–1 away, starting the campaign with six consecutive defeats which left them bottom of the table.

Cardiff's next fixture was against unbeaten league leaders Middlesbrough in a match that was described in The Times as "the most noteworthy example of disparity of strength between contesting clubs". In a surprising turn of form given the club's league form, Cardiff recorded their first victory in the First Division after causing an upset to win 3–1 and secure two points. (Note: 2 points were awarded for a win at the time.) Jimmy Gill, who had been the club's top scorer the previous season, scored his first goals of the campaign with a brace and Harry Nash added a third. The victory prompted an upturn in fortune for the team as they lost only one of their five matches in October, a 2–1 defeat to Bolton Wanderers. Gill enjoyed a fine run of form during this time, scoring six goals in the five matches including braces during victories over West Bromwich Albion and Bolton in the reverse fixture. With the club struggling for goals, October also saw the arrival of Joe Clennell from Everton for £1,500 (approximately £75,000 in 2020). In an attempt to recoup some of the transfer fee, two forwards who had played an integral role in promotion in the 1920–21 season, Arthur Cashmore and Fred Pagnam, were sold having failed to score in a combined 17 appearances. The club also signed Jimmy Nelson from Irish side Crusaders for £500 (approximately £25,000 in 2020). On 31 October, club captain Fred Keenor was granted a benefit match against Bristol City.

=== November–May ===
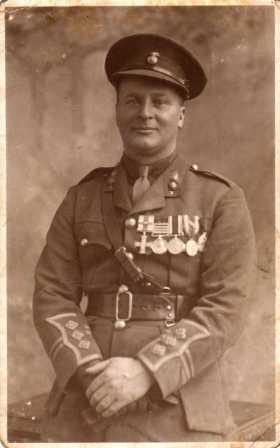
Trainer George Latham was forced into action in January 1922 due to injury, becoming the club's oldest ever player.

Back-to-back fixtures against Manchester City at the start of November yielded only a point for Cardiff, who lost 2–0 at home and drew 1–1 away. Two victories against Everton later in the month proved a turning point in the season for Cardiff. The departure of Pagnam allowed Len Davies to make his first appearances of the season, scoring all three of Cardiff's goals in 2–1 and 1–0 victories. The second fixture also saw Hardy and Smith return after injury layoffs. A much improved run of form ensued with Cardiff losing only one of their following thirteen league matches led by the goals of Davies, Gill and Clennell. Davies also scored the first hat-trick in The Football League by a Cardiff player during a 6–3 victory over Bradford City on 21 January 1922. As well as Bradford, the team's run included wins over Birmingham (twice), Arsenal, Preston North End, Blackburn Rovers and Chelsea. The Times described the team during this time as appearing "almost invincible" as their improved form lifted them to sixth in the table. The team's victory over Blackburn during this spell saw an unusual Football League debutant when club trainer George Latham was forced into action. Hours before the game was due to start, Gill and Evans both went down with sickness and only one player, Nash, had travelled in reserve. Latham, who had played professionally previously, stepped in and became the oldest player in the club's history at 41 years old.

On 25 February, Cardiff suffered their first defeat since early December, losing 1–0 to Chelsea at Stamford Bridge as the opposition defence proved impregnable. The team recovered to beat Sheffield United 2–0 in their following match with goals from Clennell and Ken MacDonald but suffered a further blow after losing 1–0 to struggling Bradford who were 21st in the table. Two matches against reigning First Division champions Burnley produced positive results as the teams drew 1–1 at Turf Moor before Cardiff won the reverse fixture 4–2 at Ninian Park. Len Davies scored a brace with Gill and Jack Evans scoring one each. Cardiff repeated the pattern in their following two matches against Newcastle United, drawing away before Len Davies scored the only goal in a home victory. Despite taking the lead early in the match, Cardiff suffered a 5–1 defeat to league leaders Liverpool on 15 April. Two days later, they lost heavily again in a 3–1 defeat to Blackburn. They met Liverpool in the reverse fixture on 22 April, their opponents already having secured the First Division title. Cardiff went on to win the match 2–0. They finished the season with consecutive draws against Sheffield United and Manchester United before beating the already-relegated Manchester United again in the final game. The side finished their inaugural season in the First Division in fourth place.

=== Match results ===
Key

- In result column, Cardiff City's score shown first
- H = Home match
- A = Away match
- pen. = Penalty kick
- o.g. = Own goal

Results

Date	Opponents	Result	Goalscorers	Attendance
27 August 1921	Tottenham Hotspur (H)	0–1		50,000
29 August 1921	Aston Villa (A)	1–2	Smith	30,000
3 September 1921	Tottenham Hotspur (A)	1–4	West	45,000
5 September 1921	Aston Villa (A)	0–4		40,000
10 September 1921	Oldham Athletic (H)	0–1		20,000
17 September 1921	Oldham Athletic (A)	1–2	Grimshaw	18,000
24 September 1921	Middlesbrough (H)	3–1	Gill (2), Nash	35,000
1 October 1921	Middlesbrough (A)	0–0		30,000
8 October 1921	Bolton Wanderers (H)	1–2	Gill	40,000
15 October 1921	Bolton Wanderers (A)	2–1	Gill (2)	25,486
22 October 1921	West Bromwich Albion (A)	2–2	Keenor, Gill	20,000
29 October 1921	West Bromwich Albion (H)	2–0	Gill (2)	35,000
5 November 1921	Manchester City (A)	0–2		38,000
12 November 1921	Manchester City (H)	1–1	Gill	25,000
19 November 1921	Everton (H)	2–1	L. Davies (2)	35,000
26 November 1921	Everton (A)	1–0	L. Davies	30,000
3 December 1921	Sunderland (H)	2–0	Gill, L. Davies	35,000
10 December 1921	Sunderland (A)	1–4	Gill	20,000
17 December 1921	Huddersfield Town (H)	0–0		25,000
24 December 1921	Huddersfield Town (A)	1–0	Grimshaw	20,000
26 December 1921	Arsenal (A)	0–0		35,000
27 December 1921	Arsenal (H)	4–3	Clennell, Grimshaw, Gill, L. Davies	41,000
31 December 1921	Birmingham (A)	1–0	L. Davies	30,000
2 January 1922	Blackburn Rovers (A)	3–1	L. Davies (2), Grimshaw	30,000
14 January 1922	Birmingham (H)	3–1	Clennell (2), Grimshaw	37,000
21 January 1922	Bradford City (H)	6–3	Gill (2), Clennell, L. Davies (3)	27,000
4 February 1922	Preston North End (H)	3–0	MacDonald, Grimshaw, Gill	27,000
8 February 1922	Chelsea (H)	2–0	Clennell, Gill	25,000
11 February 1922	Preston North End (A)	1–1	L. Davies	20,000
25 February 1922	Chelsea (A)	0–1		47,000
11 March 1922	Sheffield United (A)	2–0	MacDonald, Clennell	35,000
15 March 1922	Bradford City (A)	0–1		15,000
18 March 1922	Burnley (A)	1–1	Hardy	30,000
25 March 1922	Burnley (H)	4–2	J. Evans, Gill, L. Davies (2)	35,000
1 April 1922	Newcastle United (A)	0–0		25,000
8 April 1922	Newcastle United (H)	1–0	L. Davies	25,000
15 April 1922	Liverpool (A)	1–5	Clennell	45,000
17 April 1922	Blackburn Rovers (H)	1–3	Clennell	30,000
22 April 1922	Liverpool (H)	2–0	Gill, L. Davies	25,000
26 April 1922	Sheffield United (H)	1–0	Clennell	15,000
29 April 1922	Manchester United (A)	1–1	L. Davies	15,000
6 May 1922	Manchester United (H)	3–1	Gill, Clennell (2)	19,000

=== Partial league table ===
Pos	Club	P	W	D	L	F	A	GA	Pts
2	Tottenham Hotspur	42	21	9	12	65	39	1.667	51
3	Burnley	42	22	5	15	72	54	1.333	49
4	Cardiff City	42	19	10	13	61	53	1.151	48
5	Aston Villa	42	22	3	17	74	45	1.345	47
6	Bolton Wanderers	42	20	7	15	68	59	1.153	47

== Cup matches ==
=== FA Cup ===
Cardiff entered the competition in the first round, where they drawn against fellow First Division side Manchester United. Cardiff won the match 4–1, following a brace from Len Davies and one each from Nash and Clennell, and were praised by The Times for a "very brilliant performance". In the second round, the team were drawn away against Third Division side Southampton, whom they had defeated in the third round the previous year. The lower ranked side held Cardiff to a 1–1 draw at The Dell but goals from Gill and Clennell in the replay sent Cardiff through in a 2–0 victory.

The side met Second Division leaders Nottingham Forest in the third round. Len Davies scored his second brace in the competition to lead the side to a 4–1 victory in front of over 50,000 spectators at Ninian Park. Their win led to a fourth-round meeting with cup holders Tottenham Hotspur. The match was hotly anticipated, being described by The Times as "the greatest of the day". Over 50,000 fans again attended Ninian Park for the tie and despite Cardiff having the better of the first half, Tottenham took the lead through Jimmy Seed after the forward dribbled through the defence to strike the ball past Ben Davies with a powerful shot. Cardiff pressed for the remainder of the match with Billy Grimshaw, Gill and Clennell all going close to scoring. As the match entered the final minute, Len Davies was able to turn the ball into the net to salvage a replay for Cardiff.

The replay was held at Tottenham's ground White Hart Lane and, such was the demand for tickets, match officials agreed for spectators to be allowed to sit or kneel to the very edge of the pitch. Tottenham enjoyed the brighter start to the match but Cardiff took the lead when Jack Evans beat his man on the wing and crossed for Gill to score. In the second half, Tottenham continued to attack and were rewarded with an equaliser when Jimmy Dimmock headed in from a corner kick. Tottenham went on to score a second when Ben Davies failed to clear a cross and the ball fell to Charlie Wilson who scored the winning goal. Wilson's effort was controversial as Cardiff players complained that goalkeeper Davies had been deliberately impeded as he attempted to deal with the cross but the referee ignored their complaints and the goal stood. Tottenham advanced to the semifinal where they lost 2–1 to Preston North End.

=== Match results ===
Key

- In result column, Cardiff City's score shown first
- H = Home match
- A = Away match
- pen. = Penalty kick
- o.g. = Own goal

Results

Date	Round	Opponents	Result	Goalscorers	Attendance
7 January 1922	First	Manchester United (A)	4–1	L. Davies (2), Nash, Clennell	25,000
28 January 1922	Second	Southampton (A)	1–1	Gill	19,281
1 February 1922	Second (replay)	Southampton (H)	2–0	Gill, Clennell	40,000
7 January 1922	Third	Nottingham Forest (H)	4–1	L. Davies (2), Gill, Clennell	50,470
4 March 1922	Fourth	Tottenham Hotspur (H)	1–1	L. Davies	51,000
9 March 1922	Fourth (replay)	Tottenham Hotspur (A)	1–2	Gill	53,626

=== Welsh Cup ===
Cardiff entered the Welsh Cup in the third round, being drawn against Football League Third Division South side Newport County. Cardiff's side ultimately proved too strong for Newport as the match ended 7–0 with Len Davies scoring four, Grimshaw two and Keenor one. The side continued their free-scoring form in the following round where they defeated Merthyr Town, also of the Third Division South, with Len Davies scoring a hat-trick during a 5–0 win. In the semifinal, they were drawn against Welsh league side Pontypridd who had eliminated them from the competition the previous year. Keenor, Gill and Jack Evans each scored once to secure a 3–0 victory and send Cardiff through to the final. Ton Pentre were their opponents as Cardiff secured their third Welsh Cup title after winning 2–0 at Taff Vale Park. Gill and Len Davies each scored once; Davies' goal was his eighth in the competition.

=== Match results ===
Key

- In result column, Cardiff City's score shown first
- H = Home match
- A = Away match
- pen. = Penalty kick
- o.g. = Own goal

Results

Date	Round	Opponents	Result	Goalscorers	Attendance
18 January 1922	Third	Newport County (H)	7–1	Keenor, Grimshaw (2), L. Davies (4)	5,500
22 February 1922	Fourth	Merthyr Town (H)	5–0	L. Davies (3), Nash, Jackson (o.g.)	5,500
10 April 1922	Semi-final	Pontypridd (A)	3–0	Keenor, Gill, J. Evans	12,000
4 May 1922	Final	Ton Pentre (N)	2–0	Gill, L. Davies	12,000

== Players ==
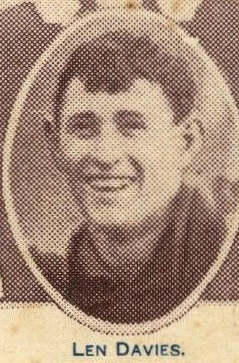
Len Davies was Cardiff's top goalscorer during the campaign, setting a new club record with 30 goals in all competitions.

Billy Grimshaw made the most appearances of any Cardiff player during the season, featuring in 47 matches in all competitions. He also made the most league appearances with 38. Jack Evans was the next highest with 44 appearances and a further five players made 40 or more appearances. Goalkeeper Tom Farquharson made a single appearance in the final match of the season. He would go on to set a club record with 445 appearances in The Football League that stood until 1985 when it was surpassed by Phil Dwyer. Farquharson was one of six players who featured in just one match for the club during the campaign. The others included Albert Barnett, who was recovering from a broken leg suffered the previous season, and George Latham, the club's trainer who played one match during an injury crisis. At the age of 41, Latham remains the oldest player ever to feature in a competitive fixture for Cardiff. Two of the players, Ernie Anderson and James Melville, never played another match for Cardiff before moving on.

Len Davies was the club's top goalscorer with 30 goals across all competitions. Although he scored three fewer than Jimmy Gill in league competition, his prolific scoring in cup competitions saw him outscore his teammate. His 30 goals was also a new club single-season record, surpassing Gill's tally of 20 the previous year and standing until the 1926–27 season when Hughie Ferguson scored 32 times. Gill's 21 league goals was also a new club record, surpassing his own tally from the previous year. The record stood for two seasons, until Len Davies scored 23 during the 1923–24 campaign. Davies and Gill were two of the three players to score ten or more goals for Cardiff during the season, the third being Joe Clennell. Eleven players scored at least one goal during the course of the season and one opposition player scored an own goal.

Player statistics
Player	Position	First Division		FA Cup		Welsh Cup		Total	
Player	Position	Apps	Goals	Apps	Goals	Apps	Goals	Apps	Goals
Ernie Anderson	HB	1	0	0	0	0	0	1	0
Albert Barnett	DF	1	0	0	0	0	0	1	0
Jimmy Blair	DF	32	0	6	0	3	0	41	0
Charlie Brittain	DF	27	0	1	0	4	0	32	0
Tommy Brown	DF	2	0	0	0	0	0	2	0
Arthur Cashmore	FW	4	0	0	0	0	0	4	0
Joe Clark	FW	1	0	2	0	0	0	3	0
Joe Clennell	FW	32	10	6	3	2	0	40	13
Ben Davies	GK	34	0	6	0	3	0	43	0
Len Davies	FW	25	17	6	5	4	8	35	30
Herbie Evans	HB	29	0	6	0	4	0	39	0
Jack Evans	FW	36	1	4	0	4	1	44	2
Sidney Evans	FW	4	0	0	0	1	0	5	0
Tom Farquharson	GK	1	0	0	0	0	0	1	0
Jimmy Gill	FW	34	20	5	4	3	2	42	26
Billy Grimshaw	FW	38	6	6	0	3	2	47	8
Billy Hardy	HB	32	1	6	0	2	0	40	1
Eddie Jenkins	HB	9	0	0	0	0	0	9	0
Fred Keenor	DF	27	1	1	0	3	2	31	3
Herbert Kneeshaw	GK	7	0	0	0	1	0	8	0
George Latham	HB	1	0	0	0	0	0	1	0
Ken MacDonald	FW	4	2	0	0	0	0	4	2
James Melville	DF	1	0	0	0	0	0	1	0
Harry Nash	FW	8	1	1	1	2	1	11	3
Jimmy Nelson	DF	2	0	0	0	0	0	2	0
Billy Newton	HB	1	0	0	0	0	0	1	0
Jack Nock	FW	2	0	0	0	0	0	2	0
Jack Page	DF	21	0	6	0	1	0	28	0
Fred Pagnam	FW	13	0	0	0	0	0	13	0
Bert Smith	DF	29	1	4	0	4	0	37	1
George West	FW	4	1	0	0	0	0	4	1

GK = Goalkeeper, DF = Defender, HB = Halfback, FW = Forward

== Aftermath ==
Brown and Willie Page, the two signings made at the start of the 1921–22 campaign, would both depart after a single season with only Brown having played for the first team. Such was Stewart's confidence in his side that the club made no major signings before the start of the following season and only a poor run of form toward the end of 1922 prompted the arrival of a few players. As a result of the team's performance, they were regarded as an established side for the 1922–23 season with The Times describing the side as possessing "undeniable all-round ability" in its preseason report.

The club recorded an annual income of £63,000 (approximately £3.2 million in 2020) for the campaign, £12,000 (approximately £600,000 in 2020) of which was profit. The difficulties in crowd control during the opening match against Tottenham had led the club to possessing what was described as "the heaviest police bill in the country". The construction of a concrete wall around the ground to counteract any further instances was approved in the hope of lowering the bill.
