= 1922–23 Cardiff City F.C. season =

Welsh football club season

Cardiff City
1922–23 season
- Chairman: Walter Emspall
- Manager: Fred Stewart
- Division One: 9th
- FA Cup: Third round
- Welsh Cup: Winners
- Top goalscorer: League: Len Davies (19); All: Len Davies (28)
- Highest home attendance: 50,000 (v Tottenham Hotspur, 2 September 1922)
- Lowest home attendance: 15,000 (v Oldham, 28 April 1923)
- Average home league attendance: 28,238
Home colours

Cardiff City F.C. played the 1922–23 season in the First Division. The campaign was the 22nd season of competitive football played by Cardiff City F.C. and its second consecutive season in the top tier of The Football League. Cardiff had won promotion to the top tier of English football in 1920–21 by finishing as runners-up in the Second Division, becoming the first Welsh team to reach the top tier of English football.

Entering the campaign, Cardiff were considered one of the strongest sides in the division, but, despite scoring more goals than any other side, indifferent away form ultimately resulted in a ninth-place finish. In the FA Cup, the side reached the third round after victories over Watford and Leicester City but were eliminated by Tottenham Hotspur for the second consecutive season. Cardiff were the reigning holders of the Welsh Cup having won the 1922 final. In the early rounds, the team showed their strength with 7–0 and 10–0 victories over amateur sides Rhymney and Oswestry. They went on to retain their title after defeating Aberdare Athletic in the final.

Jack Evans made 50 appearances in all competitions during the season, more than any other player. He missed only one senior team fixture, due to an international call-up. Five other players made over 40 appearances and 27 players made at least one senior appearance. Len Davies was the club's top goalscorer for the second consecutive season. He scored 28 goals in all competitions including 19 in the First Division. He also scored the winning goal in the final of the Welsh Cup.

== Background and preseason ==
Cardiff had entered The Football League in 1920, winning promotion from the Second Division in its first attempt. The team had endured a difficult start in the First Division the following year, losing the first six matches of the campaign, but the signing of Joe Clennell and the emergence of Len Davies vastly improved the team's attack and they eventually went on to finish fourth.

The team's performance meant that confidence was high heading into the new season. Manager Fred Stewart remained in charge of the side for the eighth consecutive season of competitive football and felt no need to make any significant signings prior to the new season. Club captain Charlie Brittain was quoted in the South Wales Echo, "We ought to do well, seeing that the present season opens as a sort of continuation of the glorious run we had last year [...] if we do no more than reproduce our old form it must needs be a great side that will stem our progress." The Times expressed a similar belief in the team's potential prior to the start of the campaign, stating that Cardiff possessed "undeniable all-round ability" and reported in the early stages of the season that the team were "at present considered to be as good a team as any in the First Division of the League".

Tommy Brown and Willie Page who had both been signed at the start of the previous season were the only notable departures from the first team squad.

== First Division ==
In a repeat of the team's first season in the First Division, Cardiff met Tottenham Hotspur at White Hart Lane in the first match of the campaign in a tie that was regarded as the biggest game of the opening day. The match was described as "disappointing to watch" by The Times match reporter as the warm weather proved draining to both sides. Cardiff fell behind in the first five minutes of the match as Jimmy Cantrell gave Tottenham the lead. Although Cardiff enjoyed the majority of the chances, it took until midway through the second half to equalise through Jimmy Gill. Len Davies missed a late chance to win the match when he failed to react to a mistake by the opposition goalkeeper who had misjudged a cross and the game ended in a draw. Two days later, Cardiff recorded its first win of the season by defeating Aston Villa 3–0 at Ninian Park after a brace from Clennell and one goal from Billy Grimshaw. In the reverse fixture against Tottenham on 2 September, Cardiff suffered a 3–2 defeat in front of 50,000 spectators. Len Davies, the previous season's top goalscorer in all competitions, scored his first goals of the campaign with a brace. Despite taking the lead, three second half goals gave Tottenham an unassailable lead and Cardiff's efforts were further hampered by an injury to Clennell. Cardiff recovered by beating Villa 3–1 in the two sides' second meeting on 8 September.

The team recorded a 4–1 home victory over Arsenal to move into fourth place after five matches. Arsenal took the lead in the first half through Tom Whittaker before Grimshaw equalised. In the second half, a brace from Len Davies and one from Harry Nash secured victory for Cardiff. Cardiff was considered a heavy favourite to repeat its win in the reverse fixture on 16 September. However, Arsenal dominated the fixture and won the match 2–1 as Cardiff suffered injuries to Jack Page, already deputising for the injured Jimmy Blair, and Gill. The defeat saw Cardiff fall to seventh in the table and was the start of a poor run of form that would damage the club's season. Back-to-back defeats against Everton followed at the end of September and this pattern was repeated in successive fixtures against Sunderland in October. A 3–1 away defeat against reigning league holders and league leaders Liverpool meant Cardiff had suffered six consecutive defeats and left the club in 21st position with only Stoke remaining below them. In the reverse fixture against Liverpool on 26 October, the team won their first fixture since early September to end their losing run, winning 3–0 following goals from Grimshaw, Ken MacDonald and Clennell. The victory lifted Cardiff out of the relegation zone at the expense of Preston North End. A goalless draw against Birmingham was followed by a 1–1 draw against the same opponents on 11 November, despite Cardiff playing with what The Times described as "a great pace, which would have beaten many teams".

Cardiff's brief return to form was ended by consecutive 1–0 defeats against Huddersfield Town at the end of November. The team defeated bottom side Stoke 2–1 on 2 December following goals from Gill and Clennell but defeat to Stoke in the reverse fixture a week later left the two sides tied at the bottom of the league on 13 points along with Arsenal and Oldham Athletic. The Times expressed surprise at the club's struggles in the first half of the season, reporting "Cardiff City can play extremely well at Cardiff on occasions [...] They have not however reproduced their form at the end of last season, playing rather in-and-ourlt football". The slump in form was blamed largely on the team's attacking players and their lack of scoring. This prompted manager Fred Stewart to make the first major signings of the season, with Fergie Aitken arriving on a free transfer. The side were credited with playing "dashing and improved football" as they recorded a 3–1 home victory over Manchester City in their following match. In the week following the fixture, defender Blair collapsed during a training session and was taken to a local hospital. It was believed that he was still suffering effects from a bout of pneumonia earlier in the season. A second signing arrived soon after with George Reid arriving from Walsall. He made a goalscoring debut for Cardiff in the reverse fixture against Manchester City with what proved a consolation goal as the side were soundly beaten 5–1. He scored again in the club's following fixture with Gill adding a brace in a 3–0 win over West Bromwich Albion before Cardiff finished the year with a defeat to West Brom and a goalless draw with Bolton Wanderers.

Reid scored his third goal in five appearances since his arrival with the only goal in a victory over Bolton on 6 January, moving Cardiff four points clear of the relegation places. However, after Reid failed to score in a 3–1 defeat to Blackburn Rovers and Len Davies scored in consecutive FA Cup matches with Reid cup-tied, Davies was restored to the first team. His return proved pivotal as the team's goalscoring rapidly improved, recording consecutive 5–0 home victories over Blackburn and Newcastle United with Davies and Gill scoring all but one of the goals in the ties. The pair scored again against fellow strugglers Nottingham Forest on 17 February to give Cardiff a 2–0 lead before Forest rallied in the final 30 minutes, coming from behind to win 3–2. After losing to Newcastle and drawing 1–1 with Chelsea, Cardiff recorded its biggest victory of the season by beating Chelsea 6–1 in the reverse fixture at Ninian Park. Len Davies scored a hat-trick for the side with Gill scoring a brace and Jack Evans scoring once. The result began a strong run of form for the team as they went on to defeat Middlesbrough in back-to-back fixtures, Preston and Burnley. The five straight victories saw Cardiff rise up the table and by the start of April the club had moved into the top ten.

Cardiff's winning streak ended with a 2–2 draw with Burnley at Ninian Park on 2 April with both goals being scored by Keenor. With Gill and Davies both absent, defenders Keenor and Page were used as makeshift strikers. Keenor remained in his new role for a 3–0 defeat against Preston before international call-ups depleted Cardiff's squad even further with six players being named in their international squads. As a result, Herbert Kneeshaw, Sidney Evans, Fred Mason, Vince Jones and Billy Taylor were all called upon to make their first appearance of the season and helped the side to a 1–0 victory over Sheffield United. Cardiff's first team returned a week later for the reverse fixture but could only manage a goalless draw. The team finished their campaign with a 3–1 victory over Nottingham Forest and a 2–0 victory over Oldham before losing their final match 3–1 in the reverse fixture against Oldham. They finished the season in ninth position and were the highest scoring team in the First Division with 73 goals.

=== Match results ===
Key

- In the result column, Cardiff City's score is shown first
- H = Home match
- A = Away match
- pen. = Penalty kick
- o.g. = Own goal

Results

Division One match results
Date	Opponents	Result	Goalscorers	Attendance
26 August 1922	Tottenham Hotspur (A)	1–1	Gill	40,000
28 August 1922	Aston Villa (H)	3–0	Clennell (2), Grimshaw	45,000
2 September 1922	Tottenham Hotspur (H)	2–3	L. Davies (2)	50,000
4 September 1922	Aston Villa (A)	4–1	Nash, Grimshaw	40,000
9 September 1922	Arsenal (H)	4–1	Grimshaw, Nash, L. Davies (2)	30,000
16 September 1922	Arsenal (A)	1–2	L. Davies	45,000
23 September 1922	Everton (H)	0–2		30,000
30 September 1922	Everton (A)	1–3	Smith	35,000
7 October 1922	Sunderland (H)	2–4	Clennell (2)	37,000
14 October 1922	Sunderland (A)	1–2	MacDonald	35,000
21 October 1922	Liverpool (A)	1–3	Clennell (pen)	35,000
28 October 1922	Liverpool (H)	3–0	Grimshaw, MacDonald, Clennell	35,000
4 November 1922	Birmingham (A)	0–0		30,000
11 November 1922	Birmingham (A)	1–1	Gill	25,000
18 November 1922	Huddersfield Town (A)	0–1		15,000
25 November 1922	Huddersfield Town (H)	0–1		27,000
2 December 1922	Stoke (H)	2–1	Gill, Clennell	27,000
9 December 1922	Stoke (A)	1–3	MacDonald	15,000
16 December 1922	Manchester City (H)	3–1	Gill, MacDonald (2)	20,000
23 December 1922	Manchester City (A)	1–5	Reid	16,000
26 December 1922	West Bromwich Albion (H)	3–0	Gill (2), Reid	35,000
27 December 1922	West Bromwich Albion (A)	0–4		14,898
30 December 1922	Bolton Wanderers (A)	0–0		15,829
6 January 1923	Bolton Wanderers (H)	1–1	Reid	25,000
20 January 1923	Blackburn Rovers (A)	1–3	Nash	20,000
27 January 1923	Blackburn Rovers (H)	5–0	Gill (3), L. Davies (2)	25,000
10 February 1923	Newcastle United (H)	5–0	Grimshaw, Gill (2), L. Davies (2)	27,000
17 February 1923	Nottingham Forest (A)	2–3	L. Davies, Gill	10,000
28 February 1923	Newcastle United (A)	1–3	L. Davies	10,000
3 March 1923	Chelsea (A)	1–1	Gill	20,000
10 March 1923	Chelsea (H)	6–1	L. Davies (3), Evans, Gill (2)	25,000
17 March 1923	Middlesbrough (H)	2–0	Gill, Reid	22,000
24 March 1923	Middlesbrough (A)	1–0	Gill	15,000
30 March 1923	Burnley (A)	5–1	Clennell (3), Keenor, L. Davies	22,000
31 March 1923	Preston North End (H)	1–0	L. Davies	20,000
2 April 1923	Burnley (H)	2–2	Keenor (2)	35,000
7 April 1923	Preston North End (A)	0–3		20,000
14 April 1923	Sheffield United (H)	1–0	Clennell	15,000
21 April 1923	Sheffield United (H)	0–0		20,000
25 April 1923	Nottingham Forest (H)	3–1	Clennell, L. Davies (2)	18,000
28 April 1923	Oldham Athletic (H)	2–0	Clennell (2) (1 pen)	15,000
5 May 1923	Oldham Athletic (A)	1–3	L. Davies	6,000

=== Partial league table ===
Pos	Team	Pld	W	D	L	GF	GA	GAv	Pts
7	West Bromwich Albion	42	17	11	14	58	49	1.184	45
8	Manchester City	42	17	11	14	50	49	1.020	45
9	Cardiff City	42	18	7	17	73	59	1.237	43
10	Sheffield United	42	16	10	16	68	64	1.063	42
11	Arsenal	42	16	10	16	61	62	0.984	42

Source: World Football
Rules for classification: 1) Points; 2) Goal average; 3) Goals scored

== Cup matches ==
=== FA Cup ===
Cardiff entered the FA Cup in the first round, being drawn against Third Division South side Watford at home. A crowd of 34,000 witnessed a 1–1 draw between the sides, with Jack Evans scoring for Cardiff via a penalty, resulting in the need for a replay. The teams met again on 17 January 1923 but neither side emerged victorious for a second time as the match ended in a 2–2 draw. A second replay was needed at a neutral ground, being held at the home stadium of Aston Villa, Villa Park on 22 January. Watford led the tie with ten minutes remaining before Cardiff scored two late goals through Herbie Evans and Len Davies to finally overcome the lower ranked opponents. In the second round, Cardiff overcame Leicester City 1–0 through Len Davies' goal.

Having been eliminated by Tottenham Hotspur in the third round the previous season, Cardiff were drawn against the side again in the 1922–23 season. 54,000 fans attended the tie at Ninian Park with heavy rain and wind making playing conditions difficult. Tottenham dominated the first half and led 3–0 by half-time. However, Cardiff scored early in the second half through Gill and Jack Evans later converted a penalty to make the score 3–2. Cardiff pressured Tottenham for the remainder of the game but were unable to score an equalising goal as Tottenham defeated Cardiff in the FA Cup for the second consecutive season.

=== Match results ===
Key

- In the result column, Cardiff City's score is shown first
- H = Home match
- A = Away match
- N = Neutral venue
- pen. = Penalty kick
- o.g. = Own goal

Results

FA Cup match results
Date	Round	Opponents	Result	Goalscorers	Attendance
13 January 1923	First	Watford (H)	1–1	J. Evans (pen)	34,000
17 January 1923	First (replay)	Watford (A)	2–2	L. Davies, Clennell	12,720
22 January 1923	First (replay)	Watford (N)	2–1	H. Evans, L. Davies	15,000
3 February 1923	Second	Leicester City (A)	1–0	L. Davies	35,680
24 February 1923	Third	Tottenham Hotspur (H)	2–3	Gill, J. Evans (pen)	54,000

=== Welsh Cup ===
Cardiff entered the Welsh Cup in the fourth round as reigning holders having defeated Ton Pentre in the 1922 final. The team were drawn against Rhymney and proved too strong for the amateur side, recording a 7–0 victory with five different goal scorers and a hat-trick for Gill. In the following round, Cardiff again proved far too strong for amateur opponents as Oswestry were soundly beaten 10–0. Len Davies, Gill and Reid all scored hat-tricks in the tie with Keenor the other goalscorer. Third Division South side and South Wales rivals Swansea Town were the opposition in the semi-final and proved a much sterner test. Len Davies and a brace from Clennell secured a narrow 3–2 victory for Cardiff.

In the final, Cardiff met another Third Division South side, Aberdare Athletic at Swansea's Vetch Field. The match was described as "hard-fought" in local press coverage, and Aberdare took an early lead in front of the 8,000 spectators. Cardiff equalised soon after when an Aberdare defender accidentally gave the ball away allowing Grimshaw to score easily. In the second half, Gill gave Cardiff the lead before Len Davies added a third. Aberdare converted a penalty to pull a goal back but the match finished 3–2. Cardiff captain Blair received the trophy from Football Association of Wales (FAW) vice-president Sydney Nicholls. The match generated £450 in gate receipts.

=== Match results ===
Key

- In the result column, Cardiff City's score is shown first
- H = Home match
- A = Away match
- N = Neutral venue
- pen. = Penalty kick
- o.g. = Own goal

Results

Welsh Cup match results
Date	Round	Opponents	Result	Goalscorers	Attendance
7 February 1923	Fourth	Rhymney (H)	7–0	Gill (3), L. Davies, Nock, Keenor, S. Evans	3,000
14 March 1923	Fifth	Oswestry (H)	10–0	L. Davies (3), Gill (3), Reid (3), Keenor	3,000
11 April 1923	Semi-final	Swansea Town (A)	3–2	Clennell (2), L. Davies	12,000
3 May 1923	Final	Aberdare Athletic (N)	3–2	Grimshaw, Gill, L. Davies	8,000

== Player details ==
Jack Evans made more appearances for Cardiff during the 1922–23 season than any other player, playing in 41 league matches and all nine FA Cup and Welsh Cup fixtures. He missed only one match in any senior team competition, a 1–0 win over Sheffield United in the First Division, due to an international call-up for Wales. Five other players made 40 or more appearances during the course of the season, including Billy Grimshaw who had made the most appearances the previous season. Six players made a single appearance during the season, four of whom played in the 1–0 victory over Sheffield United that was disrupted by international call-ups. The match was the only senior appearance that Fred Mason, Vince Jones and Billy Turnbull made for Cardiff during their careers. In total, 27 players made at least one senior appearance during the season.

For the second consecutive season, Len Davies finished the campaign as the club's top goalscorer. His tally of 19 in the league was the highest by any Cardiff player and he scored a further 8 goals in cup competitions, including the winning goal in the Welsh Cup final. Jimmy Gill was the second highest scoring player, scoring 20 or more goals for the third consecutive season since his arrival at the club. Joe Clennell was the only other Cardiff player to reach double figures, scoring 17 times.

=== Player statistics ===
Player	Position	First Division		FA Cup		Welsh Cup		Total	
Player	Position	Apps	Goals	Apps	Goals	Apps	Goals	Apps	Goals
Fergie Aitken	FW	2	0	0	0	0	0	2	0
Jimmy Blair	DF	32	0	5	0	3	0	40	0
Charlie Brittain	DF	13	0	1	0	0	0	14	0
Joe Clennell	FW	35	14	5	1	2	2	42	17
Ben Davies	GK	20	0	4	0	2	0	26	0
Len Davies	FW	27	19	4	3	4	6	35	28
Herbie Evans	HB	27	0	4	1	4	0	35	1
Jack Evans	FW	41	1	5	2	4	0	50	3
Sidney Evans	FW	1	0	0	0	2	1	3	1
Tom Farquharson	GK	21	0	1	0	2	0	24	0
Jimmy Gill	FW	31	17	5	1	3	7	39	25
Billy Grimshaw	FW	40	6	5	0	2	1	47	7
Billy Hardy	HB	34	0	2	0	2	0	38	0
Eddie Jenkins	HB	0	0	1	0	0	0	1	0
Vince Jones	FW	1	0	0	0	0	0	1	0
Fred Keenor	DF	38	3	4	0	4	2	46	5
Herbert Kneeshaw	GK	1	0	0	0	0	0	1	0
Fred Mason	DF	1	0	0	0	0	0	1	0
Ken MacDonald	FW	7	5	1	0	0	0	8	5
Harry Nash	FW	8	3	0	0	0	0	8	3
Jimmy Nelson	DF	17	0	3	0	4	0	24	0
Jack Nock	FW	1	0	0	0	1	1	2	1
Jack Page	DF	23	0	1	0	1	0	25	0
George Reid	FW	7	4	0	0	1	3	8	7
Bert Smith	DF	32	1	4	0	4	0	40	1
Billy Taylor	FW	1	0	0	0	0	0	1	0
Billy Turnbull	FW	1	0	0	0	0	0	1	0

FW = Forward, HB = Halfback, GK = Goalkeeper, DF = Defender

== Aftermath ==
Although the club eventually secured a midtable position, the high expectations at the start of the season prompted The Times to describe Cardiff's poor form as "the mystery of the season" during the campaign. Despite a disappointing season, the majority of the side remained for the following season as the club retained confidence in the players. This belief proved well founded as Cardiff went on to finish as runners-up in the First Division, missing out on the title on the final day of the season through goal average.

Club captain Charlie Brittain was the only major departure before the start of the following season as he retired from playing. Blair was appointed club captain in his place with Keenor his deputy. Grimshaw would also depart the club three months into the new season, being sold to Sunderland for £4,000.
