= List of Cardiff City F.C. records and statistics =

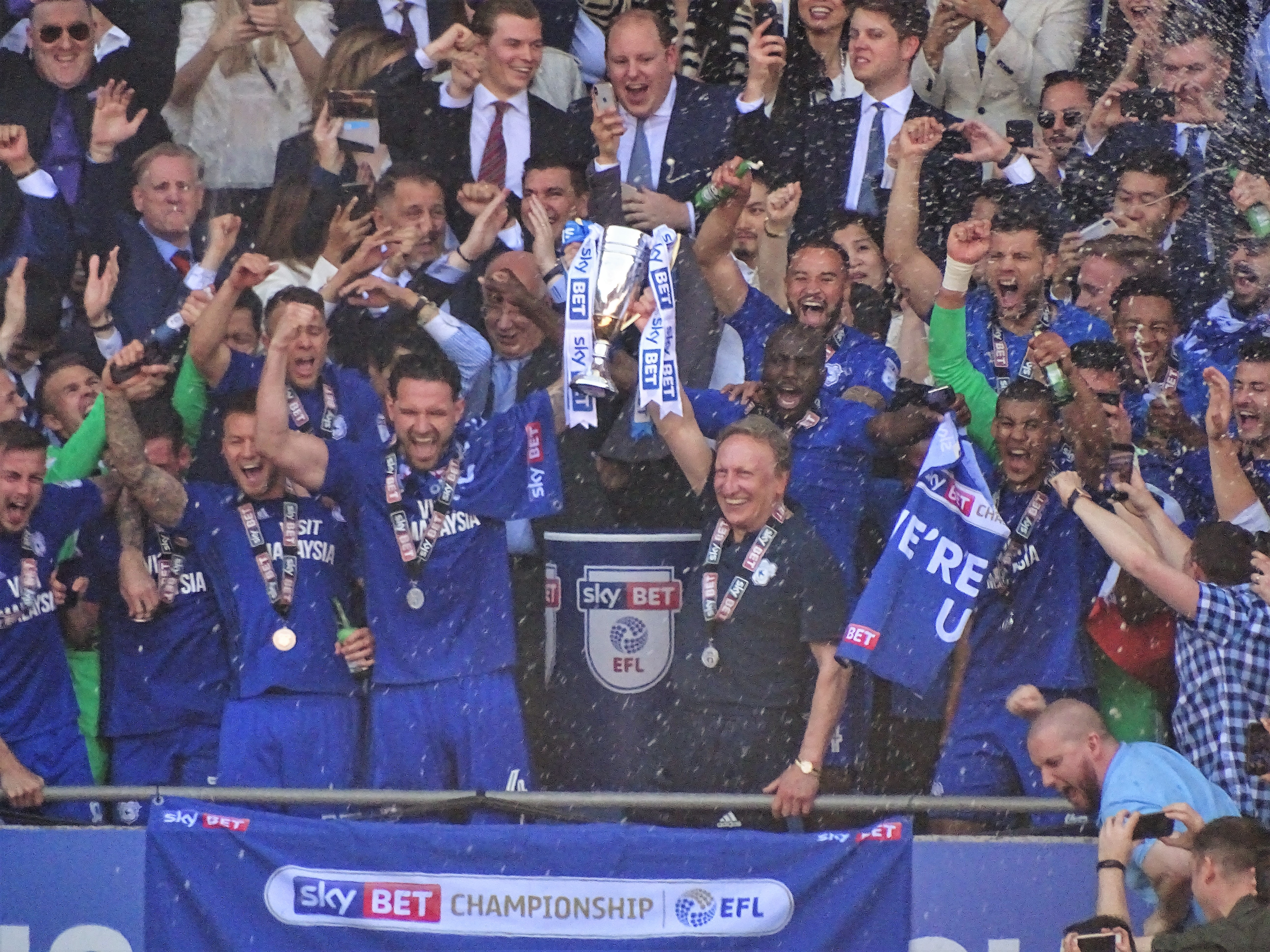
Cardiff City manager Neil Warnock (holding trophy right) and Sean Morrison (left) lift the 2017–18 EFL Championship runner-up trophy

Cardiff City Football Club is a Welsh professional association football club based in Cardiff, Wales. The club was founded in 1899 and initially played in local amateur leagues before joining the English football league system. After spending a decade in the Southern Football League, Cardiff joined the Football League in 1920. Since then, the club has played in all four professional divisions of the Football League, spending 17 seasons in the top tier since its formation. Cardiff has also reached the final of the FA Cup on three occasions, winning the trophy in the 1927 final, and the League Cup once. The team currently plays in the second tier of the English league system, the EFL Championship.

Billy Hardy is the club's record appearance holder having played in 590 first team matches between 1911 and 1931. Phil Dwyer made the most appearances for the club in the Football League with 471. The club's goalscoring record is held by Len Davies who scored 179 times between 1919 and 1931. Davies is one of only eight players to have scored 100 or more goals in the club's history.

The list encompasses the major honours won by Cardiff City, records set by the club, its managers and players, and details of its performance in European competition. The player records section itemises the club's leading goalscorers and those who have made most appearances in first-team competitions. It also records achievements by Cardiff City players on the international stage, and the club's highest transfer fees. Attendance records at Ninian Park and the Cardiff City Stadium, the club's home grounds since 1910 and 2009 respectively, are also included.

== Honours ==
Cardiff City was originally founded in 1899 as Riverside A.F.C., initially playing in local amateur competitions. The club won its first trophy under the guise by winning the Bevan Shield, an amateur cup competition, in 1905. The club changed its name to Cardiff City in 1908 and entered the Southern Football League in 1910. The club was the first side based in South Wales to win the Welsh Cup after defeating Pontypridd in the 1912 final. The side won its first league honour by winning the Southern Football League Second Division title the following year, in the 1912–13 season. Cardiff entered the Football League in 1920 and enjoyed the most successful period in its history. Cardiff finished as First Division runners-up in the 1923–24 season and reached two FA Cup finals, losing the first in 1925 before becoming the only non-English side to win the cup two years later in 1927, defeating Arsenal 1–0. The club reached a third FA Cup final 82 years later in 2008 but suffered a 1–0 defeat to Portsmouth. The club is the second most successful side in the history of the Welsh Cup having won the competition on 22 occasions, one fewer than Wrexham. The most recent honour won by the club was the Championship title during the 2012–13 season.

Cardiff City's list of competition victories includes:

=== League titles ===
==== Southern Football League ====
- Southern Football League Second Division

Champions: 1912–13

==== Football League ====
- First Division/Premier League (first tier)

Runners-up: 1923–24

- Second Division/First Division/Championship (second tier)

Champions: 2012–13
Runners-up: 1920–21, 1951–52, 1959–60, 2017–18

- Third Division (south)/Third Division/Second Division/League One (third tier)

Champions: 1946–47
Runners-up: 1975–76, 1982–83, 2025–26
Play-off Winners: 2003

- Fourth Division/Third Division/League Two (fourth tier)

Champions: 1992–93
Runners-up: 1987–88, 2000–01

=== Cups ===
- FA Cup

Winners: 1926–27
Finalists: 1924–25, 2007–08

- FA Charity Shield

Winners: 1927

- Football League Cup

Finalists: 2011–12

- Welsh Cup

Winners: 1911–12, 1919–20, 1921–22, 1922–23, 1926–27, 1927–28, 1929–30, 1955–56, 1958–59, 1963–64, 1964–65, 1966–67, 1967–68, 1968–69, 1969–70, 1970–71, 1972–73, 1973–74, 1975–76, 1987–88, 1991–92, 1992–93
Finalists: 1928–29, 1938–39, 1950–51, 1959–60, 1971–72, 1974–75, 1976–77, 1981–82, 1993–94, 1994–95

- FAW Premier Cup

Winners: 2001–02
Finalists: 1997–98 (Note: The competition was known as the FAW Invitation Cup during the 1997–98 season.)

=== Match records ===
==== Firsts ====
- First Southern Football League match: 4–1 vs. Ton Pentre, 26 September 1910
- First Football League match: 0–0 vs. Clapton Orient, 30 August 1920
- First Premier League match: 0-2 vs. West Ham United, 17 August 2013
- First FA Cup match: 3–1 vs. Bath City, 17 September 1910
- First League Cup match: 4–3 vs. Middlesbrough, 3 October 1960
- First Welsh Cup match (As Cardiff Riverside): 3–12 vs. Cwmparc 1907–08
- First match in Europe: 0–0 vs. Esbjerg fB, 9 September 1964 (UEFA Cup Winners' Cup)

==== Record results ====
- Record Football League victory: 9–2 vs. Thames, Third Division South, 6 February 1932
- Record FA Cup victory: 8–0 vs. Enfield, FA Cup first round, 28 November 1931
- Record Welsh Cup victory: 16–0 vs. Knighton Town, Welsh Cup fifth round, 28 January 1961
- Record European victory: 8-0 vs. Pezoporikos Larnaca, ECWC First round, 16 September 1970.
- Record defeat: 2–11 vs. Sheffield United, 1 January 1926

=== Season records ===
- Most wins in a season: 30 in 42 games, 1946–47
- Most defeats in a season: 27 in 42 games, 1933–34
- Most draws in a season: 23 in 46 games, 1997–98 (Note: Joint Football League record)
- Most goals scored in one season: 95, Third Division, 2000–01
- Most goals conceded in one season: 105, Third Division South, 1933–34

=== Attendance records ===
- Record ground attendance: 62,634, Wales vs. England, 17 October 1959 at Ninian Park
- Club record attendance: 57,893 vs. Arsenal, 22 April 1953 (Note: A match against Swansea Town on 27 August 1949 sold 60,855 tickets prior to the match but only 57,510 attended the match.)
- At Cardiff City Stadium: 33,082 vs. Liverpool, 21 April 2019

== Player appearance records ==
- Youngest player:
  - Paul Moreno – 16 years 115 days vs. Mansfield Town (EFL League One) – 2 May 2026
  - Axel Donczew - 15 years 234 days vs. Newport County (EFL Cup) - 7 October 2025
- Oldest player:
  - George Latham – 41 years 1 day vs. Blackburn Rovers – 2 January 1922

=== Most appearances ===
Competitive matches only, appearances as substitute in brackets and included in totals. (Note: Appearances sourced from Hayes (2006), Shepherd (2002) and Grandin (2010) to dates of publication. From 2010 onwards, appearances are sourced from Soccerbase.)

No.	Name	Years	League (Note: League appearances between 1910 and 1920 were made in the Southern Football League, appearances from 1920 onward were made in the Football League.)	FA Cup	League Cup	Other (Note: The "Other" column constitutes goals and appearances (including those as a substitute) in the FA Charity Shield, the European Cup Winners' Cup, Welsh Cup, FAW Premier Cup, Football League Trophy and the Division Three South Cup.)	Total
1	Billy Hardy	1911–1931	497 (0)	56 (0)	0 (0)	37 (0)	590 (0)
2	Phil Dwyer	1972–1985	471 (5)	23 (0)	28 (0)	53 (0)	575 (5)
3	Don Murray	1962–1974	406 (0)	23 (0)	21 (0)	82 (0)	532 (0)
4	Tom Farquharson	1921–1934	445 (0)	34 (0)	0 (0)	39 (0)	518 (0)
5	Fred Keenor	1912–1930	432 (0)	42 (0)	0 (0)	33 (0)	507 (0)
6	Peter King	1960–1974	356 (5)	20 (0)	22 (0)	79 (1)	477 (6)
7	Peter Whittingham	2007–2017	413 (42)	18 (1)	19 (5)	7 (0)	457 (48)
8	Ron Stitfall	1947–1964	398 (0)	20 (0)	3 (0)	31 (0)	452 (0)
9	Jack Evans	1910–1926	354 (0)	42 (0)	0 (0)	28 (0)	424 (0)
10	Joe Ralls	2011-2025	384 (0)	12 (0)	11 (0)	2 (0)	409(0)

=== Longest run of consecutive league appearances ===
Defender Don Murray holds the record for the longest unbroken spell of appearances for the club, playing in 146 consecutive matches between May 1968 and November 1971.

No.	Player	Appearances	Dates
1	Don Murray	146	May 1968 – November 1971
2	Damon Searle	126	October 1990 – September 1993
3	David Carver	117	October 1968 – September 1971
4	Arthur Lever	114	August 1946 – March 1949
5	Roger Gibbins	108	August 1982 – December 1984

== Player scoring records ==
- Most seasons as top goalscorer: Len Davies – 5, 1921–22, 1922–23, 1923–24, 1924–25, 1929–30
- Most goals in one season: Robert Earnshaw – 35 (31 league, 4 cup) 2002–03
- Most goals in one game: Derek Tapscott – 6 vs. Knighton Town, Welsh Cup, 28 January 1961
- Most goals in a league fixture: 5
  - Hughie Ferguson vs. Burnley, 1 September 1928
  - Walter Robbins vs. Thames, 6 February 1931
  - Jim Henderson vs. Northampton Town, 22 April 1933
- Fastest goal scored: Trevor Ford – 15 seconds vs. Charlton Athletic, 23 October 1954
- Fastest hattrick: Alan Warboys – 10 minutes vs. Carlisle United, 6 March 1971

=== All-time leading goalscorers ===
Number of appearances in brackets

Figures correct as of end of 2020–21 season (Note: Goals sourced from Hayes (2006), Shepherd (2002) and Grandin (2010) to dates of publication. From 2010 onwards, goals are sourced from Soccerbase.)

No.	Name	Years	League (Note: Goals scored between 1910 and 1920 were scored in the Southern Football League, goals scored from 1920 onward were scored in the Football League.)	FA Cup	League Cup	Other (Note: The "Other" column constitutes goals and appearances (including those as a substitute) in the FA Charity Shield, the European Cup Winners' Cup, Welsh Cup, FAW Premier Cup, Football League Trophy and the Division Three South Cup.)	Total	Average
1	Len Davies	1919–1931	128 (306)	19 (33)	0 (0)	31 (33)	179 (372)	0.48
2	Peter King	1960–1974	67 (356)	5 (20)	6 (22)	33 (79)	111 (477)	0.23
3	Robert Earnshaw	1997–2004 & 2011–2013	89 (193)	10 (14)	10(9)	0 (1)	109 (227)	0.48
4	Brian Clark	1967–1972 & 1975–1976	79 (204)	2 (13)	3 (9)	24 (42)	108 (268)	0.40
5	Carl Dale	1991–1998	71 (211)	6 (14)	5 (11)	21 (32)	103 (269)	0.38
6	Derek Tapscott	1958–1965	79 (194)	2 (9)	3 (5)	18 (25)	102 (234)	0.44
7	Jimmy Gill	1920–1925	82 (184)	12 (28)	0 (0)	7 (8)	101 (220)	0.46
8	John Toshack	1966–1970	74 (162)	1 (6)	1 (6)	24 (34)	100 (208)	0.48
9	Peter Whittingham	2007–2017	85 (413)	4 (18)	5 (19)	2 (7)	96 (457)	0.21
10	Hughie Ferguson	1925–1929	77 (117)	9 (13)	0 (0)	6 (9)	92 (139)	0.66

=== Progressive season scoring record ===
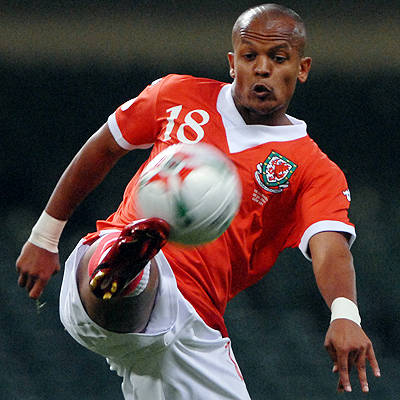
Robert Earnshaw holds the record for most goals scored in a single season

Richard Peake scored 19 goals in Cardiff's first season in the Southern Football League. This list charts the top scoring season record for the club on the occasions it has been beaten or equalled.

Season	League	All matches
1910–11	Richard Peake (17)	Richard Peake (19)
1920–21	Jimmy Gill (19)	Jimmy Gill (20)
1921–22	Jimmy Gill (21)	Len Davies (30)
1923–24	Len Davies (23)	
1926–27	Hughie Ferguson (26)	Hughie Ferguson (32)
1931–32	Jimmy McCambridge (26)	
1946–47	Stan Richards (30)	
2002–03	Robert Earnshaw (31)	Robert Earnshaw (35)

== International records ==
- Most capped player: Aron Gunnarsson (Iceland) – 62
- First international cap: Jack Evans for Wales vs. Ireland 1912
- Youngest player to gain international cap: Chris Gunter (Wales) 16 years 299 days vs. New Zealand – 26 May 2007

== Manager records ==
- First manager: Davy McDougall, August 1910
- Longest serving manager (time and games): Fred Stewart, May 1911 to May 1933 (22 years and 605 games)

== Transfers ==
- First player signed: Jack Evans, 1910 from Cwmparc.

=== Record transfer fees paid ===
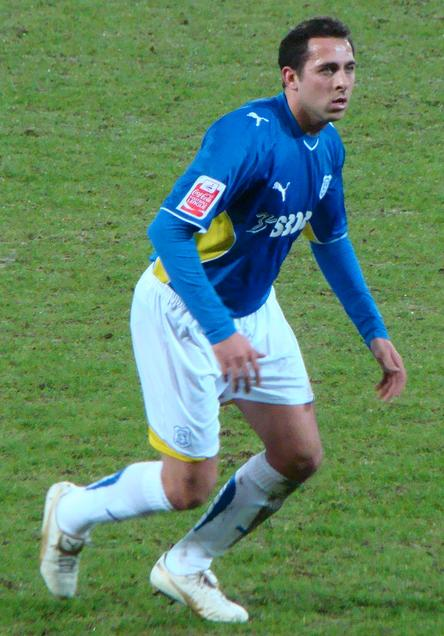
Michael Chopra, sold to Sunderland in July 2007 for £5 million, was the most expensive sale by the club at the time, and later became the most expensive signing on his return in July 2009.

No.	Name	Fee	Paid to	Date	Ref.
1	Emiliano Sala (Note: Sala was killed in a plane crash days after signing for the club and never played a match for Cardiff.)	£15m	Nantes	19 January 2019	
2=	Gary Medel	£11m	Sevilla	10 August 2013	
2=	Josh Murphy	£11m	Norwich City	12 June 2018	
4	Bobby Reid	£10m	Bristol City	28 June 2018	
5	Steven Caulker	£8m	Tottenham Hotspur	31 July 2013	

=== Record transfer fees received ===
No.	Name	Fee	Paid by	Date	Ref.
1	Gary Medel	£10m	Inter Milan	9 August 2014	
2	Steven Caulker	£8.5m	Queens Park Rangers	22 July 2014	
3	Jordon Mutch	£6m	Queens Park Rangers	5 August 2014	
4=	Michael Chopra	£5m	Sunderland	13 July 2007	
4=	Roger Johnson	£5m	Birmingham City	25 June 2009	
