= 1923–24 Cardiff City F.C. season =

Welsh football club season

Cardiff City
1923–24 season
- Chairman: Charles Cox
- Manager: Fred Stewart
- Division One: 2nd
- FA Cup: Fourth round
- Welsh Cup: Fourth round
- Top goalscorer: League: Len Davies (23); All: Len Davies (24)
- Highest home attendance: 50,000 (v Sheffield United, 26 December 1923)
- Lowest home attendance: 10,000 (v Burnley, 12 April 1924)
- Average home league attendance: 29,324
Home colours

The 1923–24 season was the 23rd season of competitive football played by Cardiff City F.C. and the team's third consecutive season in the First Division of the Football League. Cardiff had been promoted to the First Division in the 1920–21 season after finishing as runners-up in the Second Division.

Cardiff played a much improved campaign from the previous season and led the First Division for the majority of the season. A poor run of form in March resulted in the team dropping to fourth position but they recovered to again lead the division prior to the final game of the season. Needing a win to claim the First Division title, Cardiff could only achieve a draw against Birmingham allowing Huddersfield Town to move into first place and win the championship on goal average. The margin of victory, 0.024 of a goal, remains the narrowest title win in the history of the top tier in English football and was the first time the championship had ever been decided by the method. In cup competitions, the side were eliminated in the fourth round of both the FA Cup and Welsh Cup by Manchester City and Newport County respectively. In the Welsh Cup, Cardiff and Newport required four matches to decide a winner of the tie.

Jimmy Nelson made 53 appearances in all competitions, the most of any Cardiff player. He missed a single senior match during the season, a Welsh Cup tie against Newport County. Cardiff used 24 players during the campaign. Len Davies finished the campaign as the club's top goalscorer for the fourth consecutive season, netting 24 goals in all competitions.

== Background and preseason ==
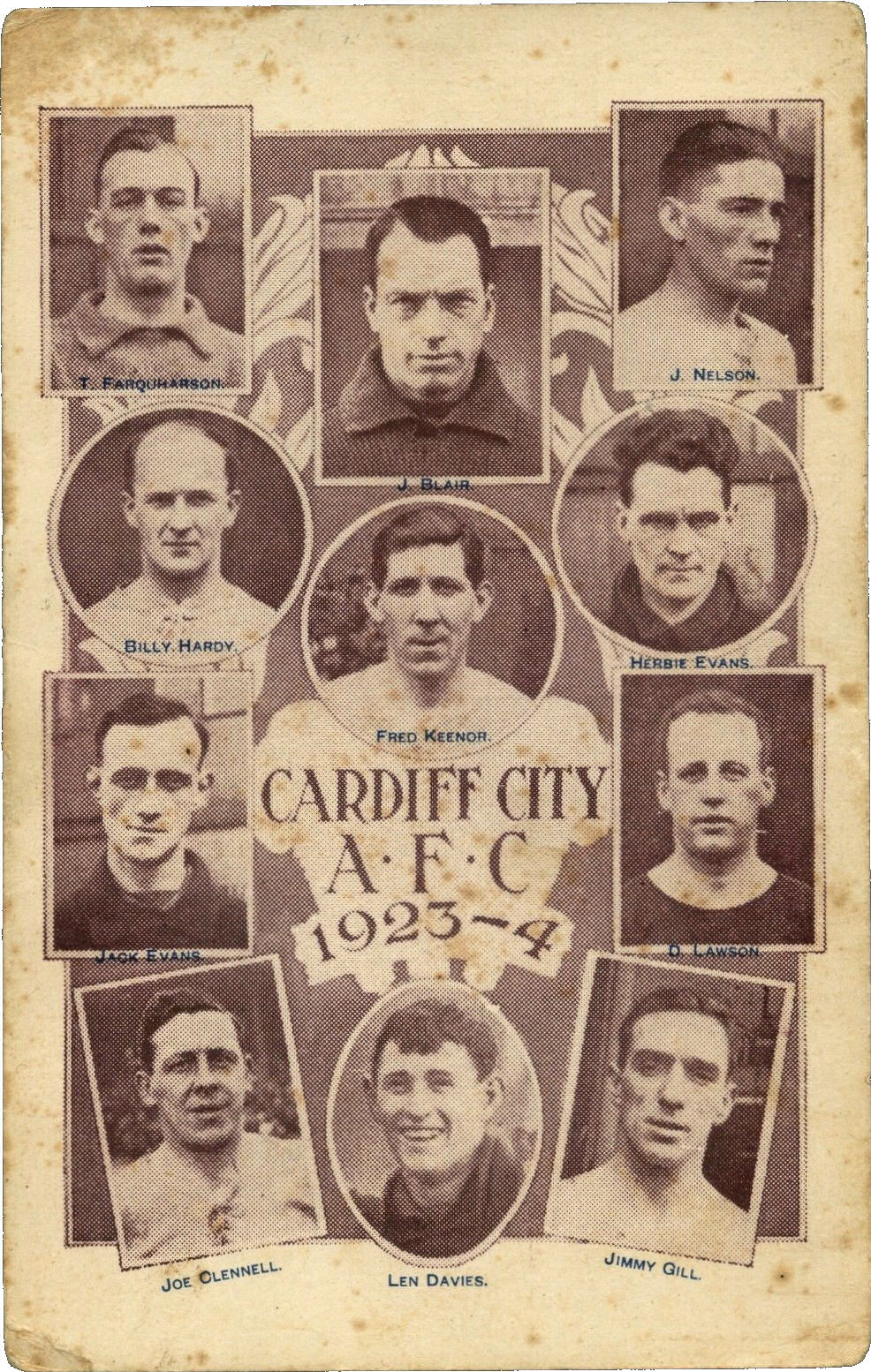
A postcard published by the Western Mail ahead of the season featuring members of the first team

Cardiff City had entered the Football League in 1920, winning promotion from the Second Division in its first attempt after finishing as runners-up. The team had adapted well to the top tier of English football finishing in fourth place during the 1921–22 season and expectations ahead of the 1922–23 season had been high with The Times describing the team as being considered "as good a team as any in the First Division of the League". However, despite being the highest scoring team in the First Division, Cardiff endured a disappointing campaign and eventually finished in ninth position.

Manager Fred Stewart remained in charge for his ninth season of competitive football. Confidence in the existing squad from Stewart and the club's board meant there was little transfer activity ahead of the new season. In a board meeting prior to the campaign a director of Cardiff was quoted as declaring the club were "envied by nearly all the other League clubs" in regards to the players contracted to the club. The decision to rely on the existing squad was described as "thoroughly justified" during the early stages of the campaign. The club's squad was regarded as largely youthful with only four players over the age of 30. Stewart continued his tradition of sourcing players from the North of England by signing forward Alfie Hagan and winghalf Harry Wake from Newcastle United's reserve side and goalkeeper William Robb from Wallsend Boys Club. The only significant departure saw club captain Charlie Brittain leave after deciding to retire from football having lost his place in the side to Jimmy Nelson. Jimmy Blair was appointed as the new club captain with Fred Keenor as vice-captain.

The club's board were forced to postpone plans for the redevelopment of Ninian Park prior to the season due to the rising costs of installing dressing rooms and offices in one stand. They instead chose to focus on improving the playing conditions of the pitch which had begun to deteriorate.

== First Division ==
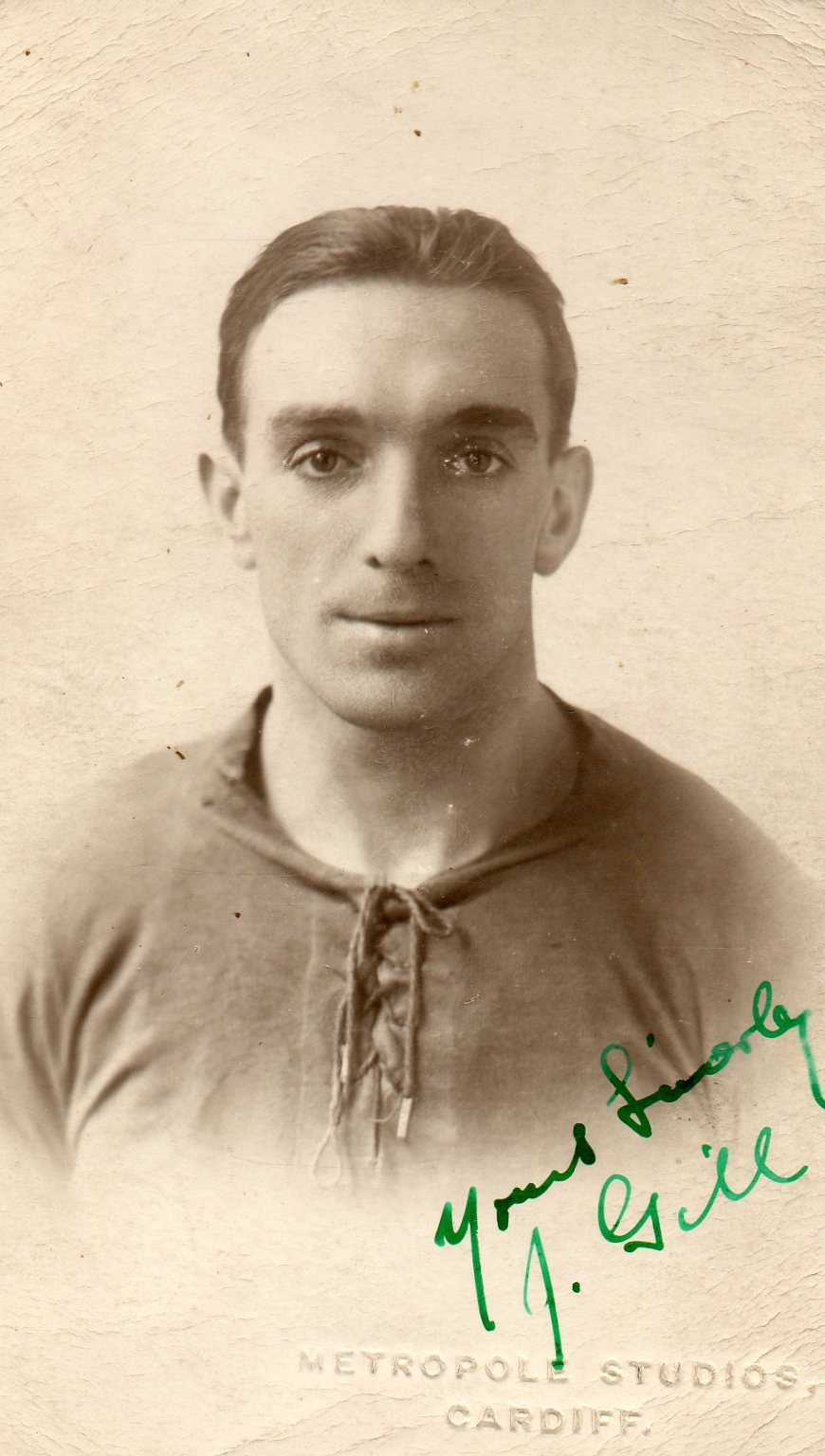
Jimmy Gill scored twice on the opening day of the season and finished the campaign with 19 goals.

Cardiff began their season with a home tie against FA Cup holders Bolton Wanderers. A brace from Jimmy Gill and one from Joe Clennell helped the side to an opening day victory with the match finishing 3–2 with Bolton's David Jack scoring twice. A 2–1 victory over Sunderland in the following match left Cardiff as one of only five unbeaten teams in the First Division after two matches. Cardiff met Bolton in the reverse fixture on 1 September in the team's first away match of the season. Bolton took a 2–0 lead before Len Davies scored his first goal of the season with ten minutes remaining. Cardiff were awarded a penalty soon after but Herbie Evans' effort was saved by Bolton goalkeeper Dick Pym. Cardiff eventually equalised when Billy Hardy converted from a corner to end the match with a 2–2 draw. A 3–0 victory over Sunderland placed Cardiff top of the table after four matches and the team's performance garnered praise from manager Fred Stewart who declared the match "the greatest game I have ever witnessed and I have never seen our lads play such wonderful football." The side went on to lose the top position on goal average following a goalless draw with West Ham United.

In the reverse fixture against West Ham, Cardiff returned to the top of the table with a 1–0 win. The side met Newcastle United, a side who had also enjoyed a strong start to the season, on 22 September. Newcastle took a first half lead but were reduced to ten men due to injury soon after. Despite the extra man advantage, Cardiff could only manage an equalising goal through Len Davies in the second half. Davies scored for the third consecutive match to give his team a 1–0 win over Newcastle at Ninian Park a week later. Notts County's defeat against local rivals Nottingham Forest left Cardiff as the only undefeated team remaining in the First Division after eight matches, with The Times describing the team as playing "bright, thrustful football that brings goals". The side continued their unbeaten run for three further matches, recording a win and a draw over Chelsea and a 1–1 draw with Preston North End before losing their first match of the season in a 3–1 defeat to Preston on 27 October. Preston, who were yet to win a match before the fixture, took an early three goal lead with all of the side's goals being scored in the space of 13 minutes. Cardiff scored a consolation goal in the second half through Len Davies, his sixth goal in seven matches. Cardiff were the last team in all three divisions of the Football League to lose a match.

Having surrendered first place to Huddersfield Town, Cardiff retook the position by defeating West Bromwich Albion with a brace from Gill and one from Herbie Evans. In the reverse fixture against West Brom a week later, Len Davies became the first Cardiff player to score four goals in a Football League match when he scored all of his side's goals in a 4–2 victory. Back-to-back fixtures against Manchester City yielded consecutive 1–1 draws. In the first tie, Cardiff were deemed lucky to have gained a point with The Times stating, "the balance of play was all against them". Billy Grimshaw had given Cardiff the lead with a "speculative" long shot with Manchester City equalising in the final 15 minutes. In the second tie, Scottish forward Denis Lawson made his debut having signed from St Mirren although he was described as not playing "a very distinguished game". The arrival of Lawson ultimately led to the departure of Grimshaw after the club received an offer of £4,000 from fellow First Division side Sunderland. Grimshaw had made over 45 appearances in the previous two seasons and had been ever present prior to Lawson's signing but the chance to recoup a significant transfer fee proved too tempting for the club's board.

Consecutive victories over Nottingham Forest in early December, 1–0 at Ninian Park and 4–1 away from home, enhanced Cardiff's lead in the table. However, the form of rivals Aston Villa, Huddersfield Town and Everton meant that Cardiff were unable to extend their lead by more than two points. An eagerly anticipated fixture against reigning First Division champions Liverpool followed and was regarded as a major test of the Cardiff team although they were expected to at least "hold their own". Cardiff eventually claimed a comfortable 2–0 victory following goals from Clennell and Gill. The Football Echo was glowing in its praise of the side, writing Liverpool had lost through no error of their own but simply "met a team that was better balanced, more capable in combination and more expert in ball control". Seven days later, the scoreline was repeated in the reverse fixture at Ninian Park with Len Davies scoring both goals. Cardiff and Sheffield United met in back-to-back fixtures on Christmas Day and Boxing Day. After drawing 1–1 in the first tie, Cardiff recorded a 3–1 victory in the second, leaving them with a four-point lead over Bolton. In the final match of the calendar year, the team suffered their first defeat for more than two months when they lost 2–1 to Aston Villa in front of a crowd of more than 50,000. After falling behind, Len Davies equalised for Cardiff before captain Blair scored an own goal to hand the opposition victory.

A goal from Clennell was enough to beat Middlesbrough on New Year's Day but the return fixture against Aston Villa again ended in defeat for Cardiff as they were beaten 2–0. On 19 January, Cardiff met Arsenal in a match that was severely affected by strong winds and rain. Against the run of play, Cardiff took the lead through Len Davies but Arsenal were able to equalise soon after. A late attack saw Clennell score the winning goal although later reports suggest that he had been in an offside position. In the reverse fixtures a week later, Cardiff dominated the match and a hat-trick for Gill and a single goal for Len Davies resulted in a 4–0 victory. Cardiff's participation in the FA Cup and Welsh Cup restricted the amount of league fixtures played in February, with the side playing only two matches during the month. After defeating Blackburn Rovers 2–0 at Ninian Park following goals from Gill and Hardy, the side drew 1–1 with Tottenham Hotspur on 16 February. The start of March saw a severe dip in the side's form as injuries to key players Len Davies and Herbie Evans weakened the squad. A defeat to title rivals Huddersfield Town on 1 March reduced Cardiff's lead to a single point. International call-ups further affected the squad in the following match as five first team players were absent for a 2–0 defeat to Notts County, goalkeeper Tom Farquharson along with Keenor, Herbie Evans and Len Davies with Clennell injured. The side's poor run of form continued as they suffered further defeats to Blackburn and Notts County to record four consecutive losses and dropped to fourth position in the table.

Results briefly improved at the end of March with two consecutive goalless draws against Everton that left Cardiff four points behind leaders Sunderland with two games in hand. The side recorded their first victory since mid-February on 7 April, defeating Tottenham 2–1. The win prompted a much improved run of form with Cardiff winning four of the following five matches, recording victories over Burnley (twice), Middlesbrough and Birmingham and a draw with title rivals Huddersfield to accumulate 12 of a possible 14 points in April. The match against Huddersfield was a nervy encounter with The Guardian stating, "the importance of the occasion overcame the forwards when they got within shooting range". The Western Mail described the match as "probably the most momentous league match every to be played at Ninian Park". The results returned Cardiff to first position with one game to play, leading Huddersfield by a single point, with their rivals retaining two games in hand which they were unable to win.

In the final match of the season, Cardiff faced Birmingham in the reverse fixture at St Andrew's while Huddersfield hosted Nottingham Forest. A win for Cardiff would guarantee the club its first title regardless of Huddersfield's result while a draw would leave Huddersfield needing to win by three goals to win the title on goal average. Cardiff's match remained goalless for 70 minutes when the side were awarded a penalty after a goal-bound header from Gill was blocked on the line by the hand of Birmingham defender Eli Ashurst. Regular penalty taker Jack Evans had suffered misses in previous months and Gill was reluctant to take responsibility. Top scorer Len Davies instead stepped up to take the penalty, the first senior attempt in his career, but he sent a tame effort at the opposition goalkeeper who saved comfortably. Despite the miss, Cardiff were still on course to win the league title as Huddersfield led Forest by a single goal. However, in the final 20 minutes, Huddersfield scored a further two goals to win the match 3–0 and overtake Cardiff to win the title on goal average by 0.024 of a goal. The result remains the narrowest margin of victory ever recorded in the top tier of English football. It was also the first time the championship had ever been decided by the method of goal average.

Fred Keenor later remarked on Davies' missed penalty, commenting "There is no doubt that the excitement and the knowledge that so much depended on the shot unnerved Len a little. Under ordinary circumstances it would have been a gift goal, but Len Davies muffed the kick and the ball rolled gently to the goalkeeper, who calmly gathered and made an easy clearance." In the dressing room at the end of the match, the Cardiff players signed a congratulatory telegram that was sent to Huddersfield.

=== Match results ===
Key

- In result column, Cardiff City's score shown first
- H = Home match
- A = Away match
- pen. = Penalty kick
- o.g. = Own goal

Results

Date	Opponents	Result	Goalscorers	Attendance
25 August 1923	Bolton Wanderers (H)	3–2	Gill (2), Clennell	30,000
27 August 1923	Sunderland (H)	2–1	Gill, J. Evans (pen)	25,000
1 September 1923	Bolton Wanderers (A)	2–2	L. Davies, Hardy	20,013
5 September 1923	Sunderland (A)	3–0	Gill, Clennell, L. Davies	30,000
8 September 1923	West Ham United (A)	0–0		30,000
15 September 1923	West Ham United (H)	1–0	L. Davies	35,000
22 September 1923	Newcastle United (A)	1–1	L. Davies	40,000
29 September 1923	Newcastle United (H)	1–0	L. Davies	46,000
6 October 1923	Chelsea (A)	2–1	Clennell, Gill	40,000
13 October 1923	Chelsea (H)	1–1	L. Davies	40,000
20 October 1923	Preston North End (H)	1–1	L. Davies	35,000
27 October 1923	Preston North End (A)	1–3	L. Davies	20,000
3 November 1923	West Bromwich Albion (H)	3–0	Gill (2), H. Evans	25,000
10 November 1923	West Bromwich Albion (A)	4–2	L. Davies (4)	20,000
17 November 1923	Manchester City (A)	1–1	Grimshaw	20,000
24 November 1923	Manchester City (H)	1–1	L. Davies	35,000
1 December 1923	Nottingham Forest (A)	1–0	J. Evans	10,000
8 December 1923	Nottingham Forest (H)	4–1	Gill (2), Clennell, L. Davies	22,000
15 December 1923	Liverpool (A)	2–0	Clennell, Gill	40,000
22 December 1923	Liverpool (H)	2–0	L. Davies (2)	25,000
25 December 1923	Sheffield United (A)	1–1	Hardy	45,000
26 December 1923	Sheffield United (H)	3–1	L. Davies (2), Keenor	50,000
29 December 1923	Aston Villa (A)	1–2	L. Davies	52,000
1 January 1924	Middlesbrough (A)	1–1	Clennell	30,000
5 January 1924	Aston Villa (H)	0–2		40,000
19 January 1924	Arsenal (A)	2–1	L. Davies, Clennell	30,000
26 January 1924	Arsenal (H)	4–0	Gill (3), L. Davies	35,000
9 February 1924	Blackburn Rovers (H)	2–0	Gill, Hardy	20,000
16 February 1924	Tottenham Hotspur (A)	1–1	Hagan	35,000
1 March 1924	Huddersfield Town (A)	0–2		25,000
15 March 1924	Notts County (H)	0–2		19,800
20 March 1924	Blackburn Rovers (A)	1–2	Clennell	12,000
22 March 1924	Notts County (A)	0–1		20,000
29 March 1924	Everton (H)	0–0		20,000
5 April 1924	Everton (A)	0–0		45,000
7 April 1924	Tottenham Hotspur (H)	2–1	Jones, Clennell	25,000
12 April 1924	Burnley (H)	2–0	J. Evans, L. Davies	10,000
14 April 1924	Huddersfield Town (H)	0–0		30,000
19 April 1924	Burnley (A)	2–1	Gill, L. Davies	15,000
21 April 1924	Middlesbrough (H)	1–0	Clennell	30,000
26 April 1924	Birmingham (H)	2–0	Jones, Clennell	18,000
3 May 1924	Birmingham (A)	0–0		50,000

=== Partial league table ===
Pos	Team	Pld	W	D	L	GF	GA	GAv	Pts
1	Huddersfield Town (C)	42	23	11	8	60	33	1.818	57
2	Cardiff City	42	22	13	7	61	34	1.794	57
3	Sunderland	42	22	9	11	71	54	1.315	53
4	Bolton Wanderers	42	18	14	10	68	34	2.000	50
5	Sheffield United	42	19	12	11	69	49	1.408	50

Rules for classification: 1) Points; 2) Goal average; 3) Goals scored
(C) Champions

== Cup matches ==
=== FA Cup ===
Cardiff began their FA Cup campaign in the first round against Gillingham at Ninian Park. With Cardiff leading the First Division and Gillingham struggling in the Third Division, having won 5 of 22 matches at the time, the match was expected to result in a comfortable victory for the home side. However, Gillingham caused a surprise by holding its higher ranked opponents to a goalless draw. In the replay at Priestfield Stadium, Cardiff led 2–0 at halftime through goals by Gill and Len Davies but were reduced to ten men after Blair went off injured. Despite being down to ten players, Cardiff maintained its advantage to the end of the game. Cardiff defeated fellow First Division side Arsenal 1–0 in the second round before dispatching Severnside rivals Bristol City in the third. Cardiff took the lead against Bristol through a brace from Gill before Clennell added a third to complete the scoring.

Manchester City were Cardiff's opponents in the fourth round with the tie at Maine Road attracting a crowd of 76,166, the biggest crowd a Cardiff side had ever played in front of at the time. Despite enjoying the better of the play, Cardiff were unable to score and the match ended 0–0. In the replay, Cardiff were again unable to score past the Manchester City defence as another goalless draw resulted in the match going to extra-time. Tommy Browell scored 12 minutes into the additional period for Manchester City and won the tie for his side.

=== Match results ===
Key

- In result column, Cardiff City's score shown first
- H = Home match
- A = Away match
- pen. = Penalty kick
- o.g. = Own goal

Results

Date	Round	Opponents	Result	Goalscorers	Attendance
12 January 1924	First	Gillingham (A)	0–0		20,000
15 January 1924	First (replay)	Gillingham (H)	2–0	Gill, L. Davies	18,472
2 February 1924	Second	Arsenal (A)	1–0	Gill	35,000
23 February 1924	Third	Bristol City (H)	3–0	Gill (2), Clennell	50,000
8 March 1924	Fourth	Manchester City (A)	0–0		76,166
15 March 1924	Fourth (replay)	Manchester City (H)	0–1		50,000

=== Welsh Cup ===
Entering the competition in the third round, Cardiff were drawn against Shrewsbury Town. After a goalless draw, Cardiff defeated Shrewsbury 3–0 in a replay at Ninian Park following a brace from Clennell and one from Hardy. The team met Newport County in the fourth round and after a 1–1 draw and two consecutive 0–0 draws, the tie required a fourth reply to decide a winner. Newport won the fourth tie 3–0.

=== Match results ===
Key

- In result column, Cardiff City's score shown first
- H = Home match
- A = Away match
- pen. = Penalty kick
- o.g. = Own goal

Results

Date	Round	Opponents	Result	Goalscorers	Attendance
14 February 1924	Third	Shrewsbury Town (A)	0–0		4,000
27 February 1924	Third (replay)	Shrewsbury Town (H)	3–0	Clennell (2), Hardy	3,500
17 March 1924	Fourth	Newport County (A)	1–1	Jones	5,500
24 March 1924	Fourth (replay)	Newport County (H)	0–0		5,000
31 March 1924	Fourth (replay)	Newport County (A)	0–0		4,000
10 April 1924	Fourth (replay)	Newport County (A)	0–3		2,000

== Player details ==
Defender Jimmy Nelson made more appearances for the club than any other player during the season. He was ever present in the league, featuring in all 42 matches, and made a further 11 appearances in cup competitions. He missed only one senior match throughout the season, a fourth round Welsh Cup fixture against Newport County on 17 March 1924. Two other players, goalkeeper Tom Farquharson and half back Billy Hardy, also made at least 50 appearances during the season with a further six players making at least 40 appearances. Two players made a single appearance, forward Jack Nock and defender Albert Barnett played his first senior match in two years having suffered a badly broken leg in 1921. During the course of the campaign, 24 players featured for the first team.

For the fourth consecutive season, Len Davies was the club's top goalscorer, with 24 goals in all competitions. Jimmy Gill was the second highest scorer with 19 goals while Joe Clennell was the only other player to score double figures. Ten players scored at least one goal for the club during the season.

=== Player statistics ===
Player	Position	First Division		FA Cup		Welsh Cup		Total	
Player	Position	Apps	Goals	Apps	Goals	Apps	Goals	Apps	Goals
Albert Barnett	DF	0	0	0	0	1	0	1	0
Jimmy Blair	DF	36	0	5	0	4	0	45	0
Joe Clennell	FW	39	11	6	1	3	2	48	14
Elvet Collins	FW	2	0	0	0	3	0	5	0
Len Davies	FW	38	23	6	1	3	0	47	24
Herbie Evans	HB	29	1	6	0	2	0	37	1
Jack Evans	FW	38	3	6	0	3	0	47	3
Tom Farquharson	GK	39	0	6	0	6	0	51	0
Jimmy Gill	FW	39	15	6	4	2	0	47	19
Billy Grimshaw	FW	15	1	0	0	0	0	15	1
Alfie Hagan	FW	5	1	0	0	5	0	10	1
Billy Hardy	HB	39	3	6	0	5	1	50	5
Eddie Jenkins	HB	3	0	0	0	2	0	5	0
Jimmy Jones	FW	12	2	0	0	4	1	16	3
Fred Keenor	DF	39	1	6	0	4	0	49	1
Herbert Kneeshaw	GK	3	0	0	0	0	0	3	0
Denis Lawson	FW	18	0	6	0	2	0	26	0
Jack Lewis	HB	0	0	0	0	4	0	4	0
Jimmy Nelson	HB	42	0	6	0	5	0	53	0
Jack Nock	FW	0	0	0	0	1	0	1	0
Jack Page	DF	6	0	1	0	3	0	10	0
Bert Smith	DF	4	0	0	0	0	0	4	0
Billy Taylor	HB	4	0	0	0	2	0	6	0
Harry Wake	DF	12	0	0	0	1	0	13	0

FW = Forward, HB = Halfback, GK = Goalkeeper, DF = Defender

== Aftermath ==
Despite losing the title after having led the league for the majority of the season, the Cardiff team were greeted by large crowds of supporters on their return to Cardiff Central railway station from Birmingham. Immediately after the season, Cardiff embarked on the first overseas tour in the club's history, playing in Czechoslovakia, Austria and Germany. The team, joined by new signing Harry Beadles, travelled for three days to reach their first destination in Prague where they were due to play AC Sparta Prague. The match turned sour as Prague players were accused of overly physical play with Keenor angrily declaring at half time "If I get any more kicks on the shin I shall be chopping someone off at the knees". Matters worsened in the second half as Cardiff players found themselves being physically assaulted by members of the crowd. Players who went to the side of the pitch to take throw-ins and corner-kicks found themselves receiving kicks and punches from spectators. Cardiff went on to lose the match 3–2 but won a second game by the same scoreline. The side continued their tour in Austria, where they recorded a 2–0 victory over First Vienna, before continuing on to Germany where they defeated Borussia Dortmund 2–0 and drew 2–2 with Hamburger SV.

Cardiff's second-placed finish remains the highest position ever recorded by the side in the Football League. The following season, the side would go on to become the first Welsh side to reach the final of the FA Cup where they suffered a 1–0 defeat to Sheffield United.
