= Sidney Evans (footballer) =

English footballer

Personal information
- Date of birth: 1893
- Place of birth: Darlaston, England
- Date of death: Unknown
- Height: 5 ft 8 in (1.73 m)
- Position: Outside right

Youth career
- Darlaston

Senior career*
Years	Team	Apps	(Gls)
1920–1923	Cardiff City	9	(1)
1923–1925	Manchester United	6	(2)
1925–1926	Pontypridd		
Total		15	(3)
- * Club domestic league appearances and goals

Sidney T. Evans (1893 – after 1925) was an English footballer who played as an outside right. He was born in Darlaston, near Walsall.

After being spotted playing amateur football, Evans was brought to Cardiff City by then manager Fred Stewart in the club's first season in The Football League, making his debut in a 1–0 defeat to Leeds United. In his second game, he scored what would later turn out to be his only goal for the club during a 3–0 victory over Nottingham Forest. Having helped the club to win promotion to the First Division in 1921, he struggled to make an impact on the side in his second year due to the performances of Billy Grimshaw and left the club in May 1923, signing for Second Division side Manchester United. There he played as back-up to Joe Spence, but he did not make his debut until April 1924, playing in the last six matches of the 1923–24 season, as the forward line was shuffled to cover the absent James Miller. His only two goals came in the 2–2 draw at home to Clapton Orient on 21 April 1924. Spence was ever-present in the 1924–25 season as Manchester United were promoted back to the First Division, and Evans took the opportunity to leave the club for Southern League side Pontypridd in August 1925.
