= Ernie Anderson (footballer) =

Scottish footballer

Personal information
- Full name: Frank Anderson
- Date of birth: 1896
- Place of birth: Scotland
- Position: Wing half

Senior career*
Years	Team	Apps	(Gls)
- Distillery
- Clydebank
1919–1920	Cardiff City	0	(0)
1920–1921	Stockport County	24	(3)
1921–1922	Cardiff City	1	(0)
1922–?	Aberdare Athletic		
- * Club domestic league appearances and goals

Frank Anderson (1896 – after 1921), known as Ernie Anderson, was a Scottish professional footballer. He made 25 appearances in the Football League during spells with Stockport County and Cardiff City.

== Career ==
He began his career with Irish club Distillery before returning to Scotland to play for Clydebank. His performances prompted Cardiff City manager Fred Stewart to sign him in 1919. He appeared in two friendly matches against Bristol City prior to the start of the 1919–20 season but was unable to break into the first-team again and subsequently left to join Stockport County.

He made his debut for Stockport on 18 December 1920 in a 0–0 draw with South Shields and went on to make 25 appearances in all competitions during the season as Stockport finished bottom of the Second Division. He rejoined Cardiff City at the start of the following season, making a single appearance in a 1–0 defeat to Oldham Athletic on 10 September 1921. He later finished his professional career with Aberdare Athletic.

== Career statistics ==
Club	Season	League			FA Cup		Other		Total	
Club	Season	Division	Apps	Goals	Apps	Goals	Apps	Goals	Apps	Goals
Cardiff City	1919–20	Southern Football League First Division	0	0	0	0	0	0	0	0
Stockport County	1920–21	Second Division	24	3	1	0	0	0	25	3
Cardiff City	1921–22	First Division	1	0	0	0	0	0	1	0
Total			25	3	0	0	0	0	26	3
