= Arthur Waters (footballer) =

English footballer (1879–1952)

Personal information
- Full name: Arthur Waters
- Date of birth: 1879
- Place of birth: Birmingham, England
- Date of death: 1952 (aged 72–73)
- Position: Full-back

Senior career*
Years	Team	Apps	(Gls)
1900–1901	Small Heath	0	(0)
1902–1904	Walsall		
1904	Swindon Town		
1904–1911	Stockport County	158	(8)
1911–1912	Cardiff City	16	(0)
Total		174	(8)
- * Club domestic league appearances and goals

Arthur Waters (1879–1952) was an English footballer who played in the Football League for Stockport County and Southern League for Cardiff City and Swindon Town.

== Career ==
Waters joined Stockport County in 1904 but was hospitalised during his first season with the club due to a severe bout of pneumonia.

In August 1911, Waters signed for Southern Football League Second Division side Cardiff City to rejoin his former Stockport manager Fred Stewart who had recently been appointed. Waters was named club captain upon his arrival, replacing Bob Lawrie, and made his debut in a 3–1 victory over Kettering Town on the opening day of the 1911–12 season.
