= Vince Jones (footballer) =

Welsh footballer

Personal information
- Full name: Vincent Wellfield Jones
- Date of birth: 4 March 1900
- Place of birth: Carmarthen, Wales
- Date of death: 1950 (aged 49–50)
- Position: Wing half

Senior career*
Years	Team	Apps	(Gls)
1922–1923	Cardiff City	1	(0)
1923–1924	Merthyr Town		
- Ebbw Vale
1927–1931	Millwall		
1931–1932	Luton Town		
1932–1933	Norwich City		
1933–1934	Newport County		
1934	Cardiff City	0	(0)
- * Club domestic league appearances and goals

Vincent Wellfield Jones (4 March 1900 – 1950) was a Welsh professional footballer who played as a wing half.

== Career ==
Jones began his career with Cardiff City, making his professional debut in a First Division match against Sheffield United in place of Len Davies. However, he was released as the end of the season and joined Merthyr Town. He later played for Ebbw Vale, Millwall, Luton Town, Norwich City and Newport County. He rejoined Cardiff City in 1934 but was unable to break into the first team and subsequently left professional football.
