= George Reid (footballer) =

Irish footballer (1896–?)

Personal information
- Full name: George Hull Reid
- Date of birth: 16 January 1896
- Place of birth: Belfast, Ireland
- Height: 5 ft 9 1/2 in (1.77 m)
- Position: Centre-forward

Senior career*
Years	Team	Apps	(Gls)
1920–1921	Blackpool	3	(2)
1921–1922	Walsall	47	(31)
1922–1923	Cardiff City	7	(4)
1923–1924	Fulham	2	(0)
1924	Stockport County	11	(3)
1924–1925	Rotherham County	12	(4)

International career
1923	Ireland	1	(0)
- * Club domestic league appearances and goals

George Hull Reid (16 January 1896 – unknown) was an Irish professional footballer, who played for Blackpool, Walsall, Cardiff City, Fulham, Stockport County, Rotherham County and represented Ireland.

== Career ==
After starting his career in his home country, Reid moved to The Football League in 1920, signing for Blackpool. After only a handful of appearances for the club he joined Walsall where his talent for scoring began to emerge, finishing as the sides top scorer in his first season with 22 goals in 34 league games. The following season, he had scored 9 goals in 13 matches when he moved to Cardiff City in December 1922, scoring on his debut in a 5–1 defeat to Manchester City. Four months after joining the Welsh side, Reid was handed his first and only cap for Ireland when he played in a 1–0 defeat to Scotland on 3 March 1923.

However, he was forced out of the Cardiff side by Len Davies and was unable to regain his place prompting a move to Fulham in 1923. Reid would go on to make just 25 league appearances in the Football League with short spells at Stockport County and Rotherham County before moving into non-league football with Mid Rhondda United, just two years after making his international debut.
