= Billy Hardy (footballer) =

English footballer and manager

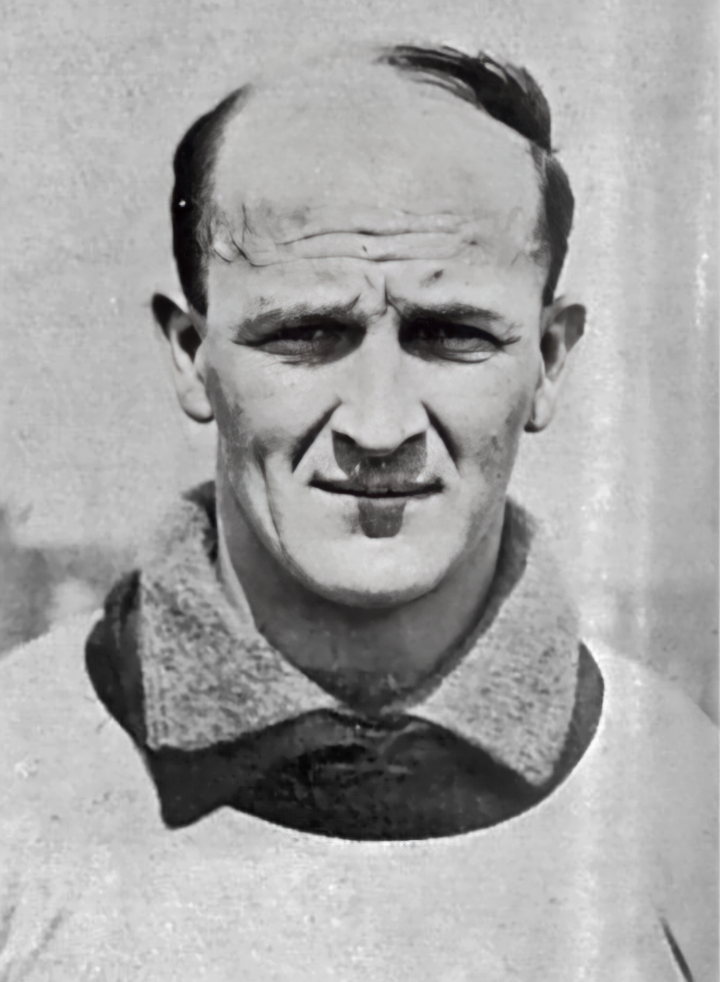
- Hardy in 1925

Personal information
- Full name: William Hardy
- Date of birth: 18 April 1891
- Place of birth: Bedlington, England
- Date of death: March 1981 (aged 89)
- Place of death: Iver, England
- Height: 5 ft 6 in (1.68 m)
- Position: Half back

Senior career*
Years	Team	Apps	(Gls)
- Bedlington United
1910	Heart of Midlothian	5	(0)
1910–1911	Stockport County	1	(0)
1911–1932	Cardiff City	497	(8)

Managerial career
- 1934–1936: Bradford Park Avenue
- * Club domestic league appearances and goals

William Hardy (18 April 1891 – March 1981) was an English professional footballer who played as a half back. He began his career with his hometown side Bedlington United before moving to Scotland where he made his professional debut with Heart of Midlothian in 1910 at the age of 18. He remained with the side for a year, making sporadic appearances, before joining Football League Second Division side Stockport County. However, he made only one appearance for the first team.

In 1911, he joined Cardiff City along with his Stockport manager Fred Stewart where he quickly became established in the first team. Prior to World War I, he helped the side win their first Welsh Cup in 1912 and the Second Division of the Southern Football League a year later. After the war, he was part of the Cardiff side that joined the Football League in 1920 and won promotion to the Football League First Division in their first season. He remained a mainstay in the first team for seven more years in the First Division, helping the side finish as runners-up in the 1923–24 season and reach two FA Cup finals, in 1925 and 1927. In the latter, Cardiff became the first team from outside England to win the competition.

Hardy was appointed player-coach in 1930 and remained with the side until 1932 by which time Cardiff had been relegated to the Third Division South. He was released by the club after 21 years. He remains Cardiff's record appearance holder having featured in 590 matches in all competitions between 1911 and 1932. He took up a coaching position with Second Division Bradford Park Avenue before becoming manager of the side in 1934. He reverted to his coaching position after two years in charge after finishing in the bottom half of the table in each of his two seasons.

== Career ==
=== Early years ===
Hardy began his playing career at his hometown club Bedlington United before moving to Scotland with Heart of Midlothian in 1910. He made his debut for the club on 2 April in a 2–2 draw with Third Lanark at the age of 18, and made a further three league appearances near the end of the 1910–11 season. The following season, he made his first appearance in a 3–2 defeat against Leith Athletic in the first round of the East of Scotland Shield in September 1910. However, he made only one further appearance for the club, in a 3–0 loss to St. Mirren two months later.

He joined Stockport County in early 1911 on a free transfer after being spotted by Fred Stewart playing for Hearts' reserve team. Stockport had recently sold two players to the Scottish side with the deal including Stockport having the choice of any two from the club's reserves in return. Stewart travelled to watch them play and selected Hardy along with one other. Hearts initially denied the request as they did not wish to sell Hardy, but relented when Stewart reiterated the terms of the deal. Although they eventually sanctioned the move, Hearts stipulated that Stockport would be required to pay £200 if Hardy signed on for the following season. He made one senior appearance for the side, in a 4–0 defeat to Leeds City in the Football League Second Division on 1 April, but Stockport were unable to meet the £200 asking price to keep Hardy on for the 1911–12 season.

=== Cardiff City ===
==== Pre-World War I ====
In 1911, Stewart left his role with Stockport and took up the managerial position at Southern Football League Second Division side Cardiff City. His first signing in his new role was to bring Hardy to the club from Hearts who had retained his registration. The two sides agreed a fee of £25. Due to Cardiff's financial position at the time, the fee was paid by Stewart himself, although he was later reimbursed when finances improved. Hardy made his debut for Cardiff on the opening day of the 1911–12 season in a 3–1 victory over Kettering. In his first season, Hardy made 32 appearances in all competitions as Cardiff finished third in the Second Division. He also helped the club to victory in the 1912 Welsh Cup final by defeating Pontypridd 3–0 in a replay to become the first team from the south of Wales to win the competition.

Cardiff achieved a higher finish in the 1912–13 season, winning the Second Division of the Southern League and gaining promotion to the First. Hardy missed only one league match during the campaign and scored his first senior goal for the club in a 1–1 draw with Pontypridd on 24 March 1913. The success was built around Hardy and Stewart's new signings, Patrick Cassidy and Kidder Harvey, who formed a partnership with Hardy that became known by fans as the "holy three". The side conceded only 15 goals en route to the Second Division title, and suffered a single defeat. The following year, Hardy recorded his first ever present season for the club; he played in all 38 matches as Cardiff finished 10th in the First Division and helped the side to their second Welsh Cup title in the penultimate season before the outbreak of World War I. During the war, Hardy served on the front lines and was wounded in action.

==== Southern League return and Football League ====
When competitive football resumed after the war, Hardy immediately returned to Cardiff and remained a prominent first team player. He missed only one match during the 1919–20 season, featuring in 38 matches in all competitions. Cardiff joined the Football League in 1920 and were placed in the Second Division. Hardy featured in the club's first match in the new league against his former side Stockport. In his tenth year since joining Cardiff, Hardy was awarded a benefit match for a league fixture on 21 April 1921 against Rotherham County, sharing the proceeds of the match with goalkeeper Herbert Kneeshaw. Hardy was ever present for the second time in his career having played in all 42 league matches as he helped the side finish as runners-up and win promotion to the First Division. He also scored his first goal in the Football League in a 1–0 victory over South Shields on 16 April 1921.

Hardy featured in Cardiff's first four matches in the top tier, but his start to the campaign was disrupted by a bout of influenza that restricted him to only two appearances between mid-September and the end of November. He eventually returned to the first team on 26 November, defeating Everton 1–0. From then on, Hardy missed only one further league match during the campaign and was victorious in his third Welsh Cup final as Cardiff defeated Wrexham 2–0. After his first season in the First Division, the Daily Herald wrote "It is impossible to persuade any soccer follower in South Wales that there is a better left-half in the country".

Two months into the following season, Hardy was approached to stand as a candidate for the Labour Party in an election for Cardiff City Council. Former Cardiff player Charlie Brittain had successfully ran in previous years and was already serving on the council. He again made more than 35 appearances during the campaign and, in the 1923–24 season, he missed only two matches as Cardiff finished second in the First Division. The latter season was also his most prolific goalscoring campaign for the club, netting four times over the year. Cardiff missed out on winning the league title after failing to beat Birmingham on the final day of the season.

In the 1924–25 campaign, Hardy played in all eight matches of the club's FA Cup run as they reached the final before losing 1–0 to Sheffield United. Two years later, the club reached their second FA Cup final, this time emerging victorious after defeating Arsenal 1–0 to become the only team from outside England to win the competition. In its match report of the final, the Westminster Gazette stated that Hardy's "tactical knowledge of handling a wing was never seen to greater advantage". He made a career high 52 appearances during the campaign, including all seven matches of the club's successful FA Cup run. He also helped the club to victory in the Welsh Cup, defeating Rhyl in the final, and the 1927 FA Charity Shield early the following season. Shortly afterwards, Hardy was also selected in a Football League XI for a match against their Irish counterparts.

=== Later years ===
After one further season, Hardy's advancing years saw his first team place come under threat. Cardiff were relegated from the First Division in the 1928–29 season, during which Hardy made 22 appearances in the league, his lowest tally in more than a decade. Upon the club's relegation, Hardy became mostly a reserve player and, in September 1930, was appointed as a player-coach. Cardiff suffered a second relegation the following year, to the Third Division South. Hardy played his final game for Cardiff on 28 March 1932 in a 1–0 win over Gillingham at the age of 41.

Despite his achievements, Hardy was never selected to play for the England national football team. This is commonly attributed to him playing for a Welsh team and selectors from the Football Association being reluctant to include players from outside England. In the later years of his career, the Sheffield Daily Independent wrote "had Hardy been with an English club dozens of international caps might have come his way. As a half back, he had few equals."

Hardy's long career with Cardiff established him as a revered figure among the club's support. Ahead of Cardiff's 1927 FA Cup victory, the Daily Herald remarked "there is no more popular player in South Wales than "Billy" Hardy". It was said that when he appeared on a newsreel shown in Cardiff cinemas, the audience cheered for 10 minutes. Hardy remains Cardiff City's record appearance holder with 590 appearances over all competitions between 1911 and 1932. With the club suffering financially from the drop in divisions, Hardy was released by Cardiff in 1932. Shortly before the outbreak of World War II, Hardy was awarded a second benefit match by Cardiff, this time in a specially arranged match against Fulham in May 1939.

=== Bradford Park Avenue ===
Hardy retired from playing upon his release and left Cardiff after 21 years to take up a coaching position with Second Division side Bradford Park Avenue. When the club directors chose not to extend the contract of manager Claude Ingram in 1934, Hardy was appointed in the role instead. He stepped down as manager at the end of the 1935–36 season having finished 15th and 16th in his two years in charge. He was replaced by David Steele with Hardy instead returning to his coaching role at the club while also undertaking scouting assignments.

== Style of play ==
Hardy gained a reputation as a tenacious half back, a 1922 article in John Bull described him as "a full-blooded 90 minutes player, one of the most relentless tacklers in the game". Although primarily a half back, Hardy often played in defence when required. Stewart, who managed Hardy for nearly two decades, regarded him as the best player he ever managed, remarking "he has never played a bad game in his life". Upon news of his release from Cardiff in 1932, the Blyth News wrote that Hardy was considered "one of the greatest, and also one of the most popular players to have taken part in English football."

Hardy became well known for his appearance as well as his playing style. John Bull noted that he possessed a "thickset body and short, sturdy legs" which may have affected his early career. He was also practically bald from a young age, which became a noted feature during his career.

== Personal life ==
Alongside his playing career, Hardy started his own business as a coal merchant in 1913, operating in Cathays, Cardiff. As a player for Cardiff City, his business was often promoted in the club's programmes.

Following his retirement, he emigrated with his wife Olive to Tasmania where he ran a grocery store. They returned to Cardiff in 1963 before moving to Iver, Buckinghamshire. He died in March 1981 at the age of 89.

== Career statistics ==
Appearances and goals by club, season and competition
Club	Season	League			FA Cup		Welsh Cup		Other (Note: Includes other competitive competitions, including the FA Charity Shield and the East of Scotland Shield.)		Total	
Club	Season	Division	Apps	Goals	Apps	Goals	Apps	Goals	Apps	Goals	Apps	Goals
Heart of Midlothian	1909–10	Division One	4	0	0	0	–		0	0	4	0
Heart of Midlothian	1910–11	Division One	1	0	0	0	–		1	0	2	0
Heart of Midlothian	Total		5	0	0	0	–		1	0	6	0
Stockport County	1910–11	Second Division	1	0	0	0	–				1	0
Cardiff City	1911–12	SL Second Division	22	0	4	0	6	0	–		32	0
Cardiff City	1912–13	SL Second Division	23	1	5	0	3	0	–		31	1
Cardiff City	1913–14	SL First Division	38	0	1	0	–				39	0
Cardiff City	1914–15	SL First Division	37	0	1	0	–				38	0
Cardiff City	1919–20	SL First Division	23	1	3	0	3	0	–		29	1
Cardiff City	1920–21	Second Division	42	1	7	0	0	0	–		49	1
Cardiff City	1921–22	First Division	32	1	6	0	2	0	–		40	1
Cardiff City	1922–23	First Division	34	0	2	0	1	0	–		37	0
Cardiff City	1923–24	First Division	39	3	6	0	5	1	–		50	4
Cardiff City	1924–25	First Division	36	0	8	0	0	0	–		44	0
Cardiff City	1925–26	First Division	37	1	2	0	0	0	–		39	1
Cardiff City	1926–27	First Division	40	0	7	0	5	0	–		52	0
Cardiff City	1927–28	First Division	41	0	3	0	4	0	1	0	49	0
Cardiff City	1928–29	First Division	22	0	1	1	1	0	–		24	1
Cardiff City	1929–30	Second Division	8	0	0	0	0	0	–		8	0
Cardiff City	1930–31	Second Division	14	0	0	0	4	0	–		18	0
Cardiff City	1931–32	Third Division South	9	0	0	0	2	0	–		11	0
Cardiff City	Total		497	8	56	1	36	1	1	0	590	10
Total			503	8	56	1	36	1	2	0	597	10

== Honours ==
Cardiff City

- FA Cup: 1926–27; runner-up: 1924–25
- FA Charity Shield: 1927
- Welsh Cup: 1922, 1927, 1928
- Football League Second Division runner-up: 1920–21
