= Fergie Aitken =

Scottish footballer

Personal information
- Full name: Fergus McKenna Aitken
- Date of birth: 5 June 1896
- Place of birth: Glasgow, Scotland
- Date of death: 13 July 1989 (aged 93)
- Place of death: Crosshouse, East Ayrshire, Scotland
- Height: 1.74 m (5 ft 8 1/2 in)
- Position: Outside right

Senior career*
| Years | Team | Apps | (Gls) |
| 1915–1916 | Petershill | | |
| 1916–1917 | Benburb | | |
| 1917–1919 | Third Lanark | 30 | (1) |
| 1919–1921 | Bury | 75 | (5) |
| 1921 | Blackburn Rovers | 8 | (1) |
| 1922 | Cardiff City | 2 | (0) |
| 1922 | Birmingham | 0 | (0) |
| 1923–1925 | Southport | 78 | (3) |
| 1926 | Bradford Park Avenue | 11 | (0) |
| Total | | 174 | (9) |
- * Club domestic league appearances and goals

Fergus McKenna Aitken (5 June 1896 – 13 July 1989) was a Scottish professional footballer who played in The Football League for Bury, Blackburn Rovers, Cardiff City, Southport and Bradford Park Avenue. During his career, he made over 150 appearances in the Football League.

== Career ==
Born in Glasgow, Aitken began his career with Petershill where he helped the club win the Scottish Junior Cup. He left in 1916, joining Benburb and winning further honours after the club won the Glasgow Junior Cup. Known for his pace, he also competed in the annual Powderhall Sprint race. After a spell with Third Lanark, Aitken moved to England to sign for Football League Second Division side Bury.

In his first season with Bury, he was ever present in the league, playing every match for the club. His performances, as the side came close to winning promotion to the First Division, led Blackburn Rovers to pay more than £2,000 to sign him from Bury in May 1921, the record amount the club had received for a player at the time. However, he struggled to break into the first team at Blackburn, making only two league appearances before being released at the end of the 1921–22 season.

Without a club for several months, Aitken eventually joined Cardiff City in December 1922. However, after making two league appearances without scoring he left the club. He later had a brief spell with Birmingham without making an appearance before joining Third Division North side Southport. He made his debut on 12 April 1924 in a 1–0 defeat to Halifax Town and made six further appearances before the end of the 1923–24 season. The following season, Aitken was ever-present in the first team, playing in all 42 league matches for the club, and formed a wing partnership with his namesake Jock Aitken. He departed Southport for Bradford Park Avenue in June 1926 but was forced to retire after eleven appearances after aggravating a thigh muscle injury when he attempted to return to action too quickly.

== Later life ==
He returned to Glasgow following his retirement, working on the city's trams where he was later promoted to inspector. In the 1950s, he briefly returned to football to work as a scout for Bolton Wanderers. He died in Crosshouse on 13 July 1989.
