= George Jackson (footballer, born 1893) =

English footballer

Personal information
- Date of birth: 17 June 1893
- Place of birth: Walton, Liverpool, England
- Date of death: 1985 (aged 91–92)
- Place of death: Liverpool, England
- Height: 5 ft 7 1/2 in (1.71 m)
- Position: Full back

Senior career*
Years	Team	Apps	(Gls)
–1923	Merthyr Town		
1923–1930	Tranmere Rovers	104	(0)
1930–	South Liverpool		
- * Club domestic league appearances and goals

George Jackson (17 June 1893 – 1985) was an English footballer who played as a full back for Merthyr Town, Tranmere Rovers and South Liverpool. He made 114 appearances for Tranmere.
