= Billy Taylor (footballer, born 1898) =

English footballer (1898–1965)

Personal information
- Full name: William Taylor
- Date of birth: 5 June 1898
- Place of birth: Langley Green, England
- Date of death: 1965 (aged 66–67)
- Position: Winger

Senior career*
Years	Team	Apps	(Gls)
1919–1920	Langley Green Zion		
1920–1921	West Bromwich Albion	0	(0)
1921–1922	Redditch		
1922–1923	Stourbridge		
1923–1925	Cardiff City	6	(0)
1925–1926	Aberdare Athletic	47	(10)
1926–1931	Hull City	152	(17)
1931–1932	Norwich City	13	(2)
1932–1933	Llanelly		
1933–1934	Aldershot	4	(0)
1934	Chance & Hunt		
Total		222	(29)
- * Club domestic league appearances and goals

William Taylor (5 June 1898 – 1965) was an English footballer who played in the Football League for Aberdare Athletic, Aldershot, Cardiff City, Hull City and Norwich City.
