= Ben Davies (footballer, born 1888) =

English footballer

Personal information
- Full name: Benjamin Edward Davies
- Date of birth: 9 June 1888
- Place of birth: Middlesbrough, England
- Date of death: 1970 (aged 81–82)
- Height: 6 ft 5 in (1.96 m)
- Position: Goalkeeper

Senior career*
Years	Team	Apps	(Gls)
1910–1920	Middlesbrough	31	(0)
1920–1923	Cardiff City	73	(0)
1923–1924	Leicester City	3	(0)
1924	Bradford Park Avenue	0	(0)
- * Club domestic league appearances and goals

Benjamin Edward Davies (9 June 1888 – 1970) was an English professional footballer who played as a goalkeeper. During his career, he made over 100 appearances in the Football League in spells with Middlesbrough, Cardiff City and Leicester City.

== Career ==
Davies began his career with his hometown side Middlesbrough, serving as understudy to England international Tim Williamson during his spell at the club, making 31 league appearances. In 1920, he joined Cardiff City for their first season in the Football League and, after beginning the season as second choice behind Herbert Kneeshaw, he eventually made his debut on 22 January 1921 in a 1–0 victory over Bristol City. He retained his place for the rest of the 1920–21 season, conceding 12 goals in his 19 league appearances as Cardiff won promotion to the First Division. Davies was later forced out of the side by the arrival of Tom Farquharson during the 1922–23 season and moved to Second Division side Leicester City. Davies made his debut for the Foxes on 8 December 1923 in a 2–1 victory over South Shields, becoming the second oldest debutant in the club's history at the time behind Chris Duffy, and made two further appearances in the same month. He later joined Bradford Park Avenue but did not make an appearance for the side.
