= Ken MacDonald (footballer) =

Welsh footballer

Kenneth MacDonald (24 April 1898 – unknown) was a Welsh footballer. His regular position was as a striker. He was born in Llanrwst. He played for Inverness Citadel, Clachnacuddin, Aberdeen, Caerau, Cardiff City, Manchester United, Bradford Park Avenue, Hull City, Halifax Town, Coleraine, Walker Celtic and Blyth Spartans.
