= Harry Nash =

English footballer

Personal information
- Full name: Harold Edward Nash
- Date of birth: 10 April 1892
- Place of birth: Fishponds, England
- Date of death: April 1970 (aged 77–78)
- Place of death: Fishponds, England
- Height: 5 ft 9 in (1.75 m)
- Position: Inside forward

Senior career*
| Years | Team | Apps | (Gls) |
- Brislington United
- Mardy
- Abertillery Town
- Treharris
- Pontypridd Town
| 1914–1920 | Aston Villa | 12 | (5) |
| 1920 | Coventry City | | |
| 1920–1923 | Cardiff City | 30 | (6) |
| 1923–1924 | Merthyr Town | | |
- Aberbargoed
- Ystrad Mynach
- * Club domestic league appearances and goals

Harold Edward Nash (10 April 1892 – 1970) was an English professional footballer who played as an inside forward.

== Career ==
Born in Fishponds, Nash played for several Welsh clubs in the Southern Football League before joining Aston Villa in 1914. He later played for Coventry City, Cardiff City and Merthyr Town before moving into non-league football.
