= Billy Grimshaw =

English footballer

Personal information
- Full name: William Grimshaw
- Date of birth: 30 April 1892
- Place of birth: Burnley, England
- Date of death: 1968 (aged 75–76)
- Height: 5 ft 9 in (1.75 m)
- Position: Outside right

Senior career*
| Years | Team | Apps | (Gls) |
| 1910–1912 | Burnley | 0 | (0) |
| 1912–1913 | Colne | ? | (?) |
| 1913–1915 | Bradford City | 7 | (1) |
| 1919–1923 | Cardiff City | 140 | (31) |
| 1923–1927? | Sunderland | 70 | (6) |

International career
- Football League
- * Club domestic league appearances and goals

William Grimshaw (30 April 1892 – 1968) was an English footballer who played as an outside right in The Football League in the 1910s and 1920s.

Grimshaw began his career with his hometown club Burnley but was unable to force his way into the side and was released. He had a spell playing non-league football at Colne before signing for Bradford City in 1913, remaining with the side up until the outbreak of the First World War. At the end of the war in 1919 he joined Cardiff City and played in their first ever season in the Football League during the 1920–21 season.

He scored one of Cardiff's goals on the day of their first ever Football League victory, a 3–0 win over Stockport County on 4 September 1920. Following the arrival of Jimmy Gill in 1920 he was moved to outside right and was a virtual ever present for the next three years before losing his place to Denis Lawson.

He was sold to Sunderland, making 70 appearances for the club before retiring and becoming a licensee in Bradford.
