= Jack Nock =

English footballer

Personal information
- Date of birth: 1899
- Place of birth: Stourbridge, England
- Height: 5 ft 9 1/2 in (1.77 m)
- Position: Forward

Senior career*
Years	Team	Apps	(Gls)
- Stourbridge
1915–1919	Millwall	0	(0)
1919	Leicester Fosse	0	(0)
1919–1920	Merthyr Town	26	(9)
1920–1922	Nuneaton Town		
1922	Tamworth Castle		
1922	Cradley Heath		
1922–1924	Cardiff City	3	(0)
1924–1926	Wrexham	65	(22)
1926	Burton United		
1926–1927	Worcester City		
1927–1928	Flint Town United		
1928–1929	Oswestry Town		
- * Club domestic league appearances and goals

Jack Nock (1899 – after 1929) was an English professional footballer who played as a forward. He played in the Football League for Cardiff City and Wrexham and had an extensive career in wartime and non-league football.

== Career ==
After playing for non-league club Stourbridge, Nock signed for Millwall in October 1915, during World War I. He remained with the club until 1919, making over 50 appearances in wartime competitions, before joining Leicester Fosse. As well as appearing in regional league matches for Fosse, he scored the last goal for the side before they became known as Leicester City during a 1–1 draw with a British Expeditionary Force XI. However, he was not offered a contract by the club when the Football League resumed after the hostilities. He joined Southern Football League side Merthyr Town, scoring 9 times in 26 appearances during the 1919–20 season.

He joined Nuneaton Town in 1920, where he was a regular in the first team for over a year. He had brief spells with Tamworth Castle and Cradley Heath in 1922 before returning to the Football League with Cardiff City. He made his debut for the club in a 1–1 draw with Sheffield United the following month but made just two further appearances in the following 18 months. In 1924, he joined Wrexham along with Cardiff teammate Jimmy Jones. He made his debut for the club in a 1–1 draw with Walsall before scoring his first goals with a brace during a 3–1 victory over Durham City in their following home match.

He left Wrexham in 1926, later playing for Burton United, Worcester City, Flint Town United and Oswestry Town.
