= Fred Stewart (football manager) =

English football manager (1873–1954)

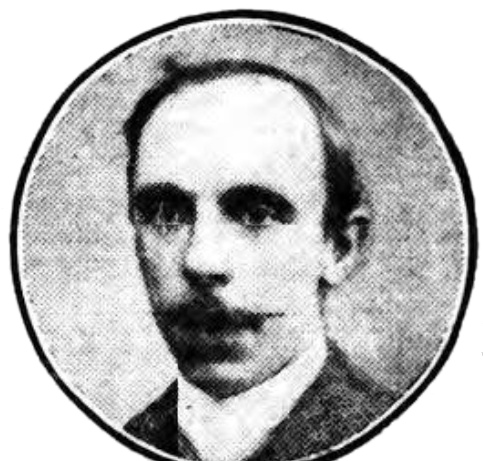
- Stewart in 1911

Personal information
- Date of birth: 1873
- Place of birth: Oldham, England
- Date of death: February 11, 1954 (aged 81)
- Place of death: Cardiff, Wales

Managerial career
- Years: Team
- 1896–1903: Stockport County
- 1904–1911: Stockport County
- 1911–1933: Cardiff City

Frederick Stewart (1873 – 11 February 1954) was an English football manager. He took up his first managerial role in 1896 with Lancashire League side Stockport County and led them to their first title in 1900. Their success saw them elected to the Second Division of the Football League. The club struggled initially and, after being forced to seek re-election on several occasions, Stewart was replaced by Sam Ormerod. However, Ormerod also struggled and Stewart was reinstated a year later.

Stewart remained with Stockport until 1911, achieving a highest place finish of 10th in his second spell. He was appointed manager of Southern Football League Second Division side Cardiff City in 1911 and led the side to their first Welsh Cup victory in his first season. The side won promotion to the First Division a year later and were eventually elected into the Second Division of the Football League in 1920. In their first season in the new league, Stewart led the club to promotion to the First Division.

Stewart was in charge of the side during the 1920s when the club enjoyed success by reaching two FA Cup finals, losing in 1925 before becoming the only team from outside England to win the competition in 1927. They also finished as runners-up to Huddersfield Town in the 1923–24 First Division season, missing out on the title after failing to win their final game of the season. The later years of the decade saw a steady decline as the club's finances dropped and by 1931 the club had been relegated to the Third Division South. Following a 19th place finish in 1933, Stewart resigned from the role after 22 years.

Despite managing for more than 30 years, Stewart's only two clubs were Stockport and Cardiff and he remains the longest serving manager of both sides as of December 2025.

== Early life ==
Stewart was born in Oldham in 1873, but moved to Stockport at age seven, where he was raised. His parents were of Scottish descent with the family having moved from Edinburgh to settle in Lancashire.

== Career ==
=== Stockport County ===
Stewart was appointed secretary-manager of Stockport County in June 1896, a position which had previously been held by his brother and which Stewart initially regarded as a "part-time job". His first match in charge of the club ended in defeat as they lost 1–0 to Stalybridge Rovers. He was in charge of the club when they gained admission to the Football League in 1900 having won the Lancashire League for the first time. However, the club struggled in the Football League Second Division, finishing in the bottom three in four consecutive seasons and were forced to apply for re-election on several occasions. Stewart left the role at the end of the 1903–04 season after which he was replaced by Sam Ormerod. However, the club suffered relegation from the Second Division in Ormerod's only season. More than 70 applications were received by the club to succeed him, but the committee chose to reappoint Stewart to the role.

In his first season following his return, Stockport finished 11th in the Midland Football League but were able to win re-election back into the Football League Second Division at the end of the campaign. Stewart led the side to their highest placed Football League finish during the 1905–06 season, ending the campaign in 10th place. He remained in charge of the club until 1911. His two spells in charge of the side make him the longest serving manager in the club's history by date, serving in the role for 15 years, and by the time of his departure he had been associated with the club for 18 years. However, his record of matches in charge was subsequently surpassed by Jim Gannon in his third spell in charge. At the time of his departure, the Athletic News summarised Stewart's time with Stockport, writing "Always at a disadvantage in regard to financial matters, Mr. Stewart has done wonders at Stockport" and adding that the club had benefited financially "largely from Mr. Stewart's ability in the discovery of young players." His final match in charge of the side was a 1–0 victory over Leicester Fosse on 29 April 1911, ending a five match unbeaten streak that left the club in 17th position at the end of the campaign.

=== Cardiff City ===
==== Southern League ====
Stewart took over as manager of Southern Football League Second Division side Cardiff City after responding to an advert placed in the Athletic News. He initially reneged on his decision when the club approached him but was eventually convinced to take over at Cardiff and tendered his resignation at Stockport during a committee meeting on 10 May 1911, although he remained in charge until the annual league meeting shortly after. Cardiff had become a fully professional club and joined the English football league system in 1910, finishing fourth in their first campaign under player-manager Davy McDougall. At the end of the season, the club's board decided that a full-time manager was needed to allow further progress, with Stewart the chosen candidate. Appointed on a three-year basis initially, he received £4 a week in wages (around £211 in 2021), equal to the maximum wage for a player at the time, with further bonuses based on success.

Stewart quickly began reshaping the squad and released all but four of the players he inherited from McDougall. His first signing was one of his former Stockport players, Billy Hardy, who would go on to be a lynchpin of the side during the club's success under Stewart. Due to the financial plight of the club at the time, Stewart paid Hardy's £25 transfer fee with his own money, although he was later reimbursed when the financial position improved. Among his early signings were Arthur Waters from his former club and brothers George and John Burton, while George Latham was appointed as a player-coach. Latham would remain in the role for 20 years and was instrumental in assisting Stewart during his period with the club. Stewart's first match in charge of his new side ended in a 3–1 victory over Kettering in the opening game of the 1911–12 season.

In his first season, the club kept pace with the league leaders but lost form during February and finished the campaign in third place, seven points behind promoted sides Merthyr Town and Portsmouth. However, Stewart led the club to its first Welsh Cup victory by defeating Pontypridd 3–0 in a replay of the final to become the first team from the south of Wales to win the competition. In his second year, he began to improve the club's fortunes as they were promoted into the First Division of the Southern Football League. Stewart made several signings before the start of the campaign, reshaping the club's defence with the signings of goalkeeper Herbert Kneeshaw and defenders Patrick Cassidy and Kidder Harvey. Stewart led the side to the Second Division title, having lost only one of their 24 games with his newly formed defence proving instrumental to their success, conceding only 15 goals during the campaign. Following their success, the Athletic News wrote that the club could "trace their success to May 1911, when they appointed Mr. Fred Stewart ... as secretary and team manager."

In the First Division Cardiff initially struggled, losing their opening five matches, but Stewart was able to improve results and spent a club record £1,000 to sign Charlie Brittain from Tottenham Hotspur. They finished the season in 10th place and results improved even more in the 1914–15 season as they achieved third place in the First Division. The progress under Stewart was put on hold soon after as the First World War broke out. Numerous first team players left the club to serve, but Stewart was instrumental in the founding of a wartime league and was able to organise a team to compete. When the Southern League resumed in 1919, Stewart was able to call upon the majority of his former players and led the club to a fourth-placed finish.

==== Football League ====
Cardiff were elected to the Second Division of the Football League in 1920 after a successful voting ballot with Stewart himself giving a speech on behalf of the club ahead of the vote. Stewart made several additions at the start of the campaign including Jimmy Blair, for a club record fee of £3,500, and Jimmy Gill from The Wednesday. The club's first match in the Football League was a 5–2 victory over Stewart's previous employers Stockport. Cardiff gained promotion to the First Division in their first season, finishing second on goal difference to Birmingham. In doing so, they became only the second side to win promotion to the First Division in their first season in the Football League, equalling the feat of Tottenham Hotspur in 1909. They also reached the semi-finals of the FA Cup before being eliminated by Wolverhampton Wanderers in a replay.

During the 1923–24 season, Stewart led the side to a second-placed finish in the First Division which remains the club's highest ever league position. They missed out on winning the title on the final day of the season; needing only to win against Birmingham, Cardiff drew 0–0 with top goalscorer Len Davies missing a penalty in the match. As a result, Huddersfield Town went on to win the title on goal average, leading Cardiff by 0.024 of a goal which remains the closest First Division title-winning margin in English football history. In 1924, Stewart summarised his approach to management and the bond he possessed with his players, commenting "We get players of decent ability, and each man does his best, with unity of feeling and purpose... We never make a change in the team without consulting with the players. Their opinion is worth having."

The following season, Stewart's success in the FA Cup continued as, having reached the quarter-finals in two of the previous three years, Cardiff reached their first final in 1925. However, they went on to lose 1–0 to Sheffield United. It would only take two years before the club returned to a final, this time in 1927. They faced Arsenal and the match was tied at 0–0 until Hughie Ferguson's shot was fumbled into the net by Dan Lewis in the 74th minute, giving Stewart the record of being the only manager ever to take the trophy out of England. They went on to complete a cup double by winning the Welsh Cup two weeks later against Rhyl and added the Charity Shield in October by defeating amateur side Corinthians.

Despite an increase in revenue from the final victory, the club's directors chose to spend the money on improving the facilities at their home ground Ninian Park. The decision left Stewart with little money to reinvest in the side and, despite a sixth-place finish in 1928–29, proved costly to the side as they were relegated in 1929 after finishing bottom of the First Division. Cardiff's slide continued and they were relegated again in 1931, this time into the Third Division South as injuries and financial problems resulted in a high turnover of players. Stewart led the club to ninth place in their first season in the bottom division. In the 1932–33 season, Cardiff finished 19th of 22 teams in the Third Division South and Stewart chose to step down from the role after 22 years. As of December 2020, he remains the longest serving manager in Cardiff's history.

== Managerial style ==
Stewart was noted for assuming ultimate responsibility of Cardiff City during his spell there. Upon news of his resignation from Cardiff in 1933, the Western Mail wrote "He has been Cardiff City, taking on responsibility, many of which he would have been justified in shouldering on to his directors and his subordinates." The paper also noted that, at the height of his career with Cardiff, he was regarded as "one of the most brilliant and shrewd managers in football." In his 1999 book chronicling the history of Cardiff City, journalist Grahame Lloyd wrote "He brought together men who knew their limitations to form sides who played to their strengths". Lloyd noted that although Stewart's teams could be "tough (and) uncompromising", they also played with "style on the ground".

Stewart was noted for his ability to find and develop young players. During his years with Stockport, several of his players went on to play at higher levels, the most prominent being Arthur Goddard who signed his first contract with Stewart. With Cardiff, the squad which Stewart considered the strongest of his time there, consisted of five players who had never played professionally before and had been signed from non-League sides or through youth teams: Tom Farquharson, Jimmy Nelson, Herbie Evans, Fred Keenor and Len Davies. Another, Hardy, had made his professional debut in England under Stewart with Stockport.

== Personal life ==
Stewart had one child, a son named William. Alongside his managerial career, Stewart also ran corn and seed and coal merchants businesses. After his resignation from Cardiff, Stewart took little interest in football but remained in Cardiff to concentrate on his businesses. He died on 11 February 1954, aged 81, in Cardiff.

== Managerial statistics ==
Team	Country	From	To	Record				
Team	Country	From	To	G	W	D	L	Win %
Stockport County	(England)	June 1896	May 1903	228	100	28	100	43.86
Stockport County	(England)	May 1904	May 1911	281	102	60	119	36.3
Cardiff City	(Wales)	May 1911	May 1933	605	244	136	225	40.33
Total				1113	446	224	444	40.07

== Honours ==
Stockport County

- Lancashire League winners: 1899–1900
- Lancashire Combination Winners: 1904–05

Cardiff City

- Division One runner-up: 1923–24
- Division Two runner-up: 1920–21
- FA Cup winner: 1926–27
- FA Cup runner-up: 1924–25
- FA Charity Shield winner: 1927–28
- Welsh Cup winner: 1921–22, 1922–23, 1926–27, 1927–28, 1929–30
- Welsh Cup runner-up: 1928–29
