= Len Davies =

Welsh footballer (1899–1945)

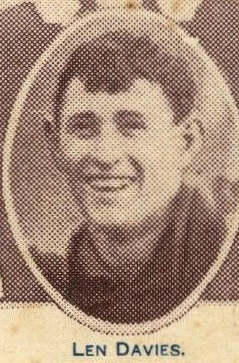

Personal information
- Full name: Leonard Stephen Davies
- Date of birth: 28 April 1899
- Place of birth: Splott, Cardiff, Wales
- Date of death: 1945 (aged 45–46)
- Place of death: Prescot, England
- Height: 5 ft 8 in (1.73 m)
- Position: Forward

Youth career
- Victoria Athletic

Senior career*
Years	Team	Apps	(Gls)
1919–1931	Cardiff City	306	(128)
1931–1932	Thames	27	(12)
1932–1935	Bangor City		
Total		333	(140)

International career
1922–1929	Wales	23	(6)

Managerial career
- 1932–1935: Bangor City
- * Club domestic league appearances and goals

Leonard Stephen Davies (28 April 1899 – 1945) was a Welsh professional footballer. Born in Cardiff, he trained as a marine engineer before becoming a footballer, making his senior debut for his hometown club Cardiff City in 1919 in the Southern Football League. Cardiff joined the Football League the following year but Davies remained a reserve until establishing himself in the first team in late 1922. He scored Cardiff's first hat-trick in the Football League in January 1922 and was the club's top scorer in all competitions during the campaign.

In the 1923–24 season, Cardiff went into their final game of the campaign needing a win to become the first Welsh side to win the Football League First Division title. During the match, Davies missed a penalty kick as his side were held to a goalless draw, missing out on the title via goal average. He also helped the club reach the 1925 FA Cup Final but missed the game due to injury. He played in a final two years later, in the 1927 FA Cup Final, helping the side become the only Welsh side to win the competition as they defeated Arsenal 1–0.

He remains the record goalscorer for Cardiff City in both league and all competitions having scored 179 goals for the club between 1919 and 1931. He later played a single season for Thames before finishing his career with Bangor City. He also represented Wales at international level 23 times during his career, scoring 6 goals

== Early life ==
Born in the Splott district of Cardiff, Davies attended Gladatone Road School. He trained as a marine engineer in his teens and spent time at sea. He also played cricket at youth level for Glamorgan County Cricket Club.

== Club career ==
=== Early years ===
Davies began his football career with local youth side Victoria Athletic and represented Wales at youth level in 1913 against England at Penydarren Park. He joined Cardiff City in 1919 and made his senior debut in the 1919–20 season, replacing George Beare for a 2–2 draw with Luton Town on 13 September 1919 in the Southern Football League. However, this proved to be his only first team appearance for more than a year. Cardiff joined the Second Division of the Football League in 1920, but Davies played only three times during the league season. His only other appearance during the 1920–21 season came in the Welsh Cup. With Cardiff meeting Bristol City in the Football League on the same day, they were forced to field a reserve side for their match against Pontypridd. Although Cardiff went on to lose the game, Davies scored the first senior goal of his career.

Davies remained a reserve at the start of the 1921–22 season, during which the club initially struggled in the top tier. With Fred Pagnam having failed to score in 13 appearances, Davies was brought into the side in November and scored a brace during a 2–1 victory over Everton. He scored in his next two appearances and remained a regular in the first team for the remainder of the campaign. In December 1921, Cardiff rejected a £3,000 (around £140,000 in 2021) offer for Davies from a rival First Division club. He scored Cardiff's first hat-trick in the Football League on 21 January 1922 during a 6–3 victory over Bradford City. He was also prolific in the Welsh Cup, scoring four times against Newport County in the third round and adding a hat-trick against Merthyr Town in the fourth. In the final, Davies scored Cardiff's second goal as they defeated Ton Pentre 2–0. He finished the season as Cardiff's second highest scorer in the First Division with 17, 3 short of Jimmy Gill, but his scoring exploits in the FA Cup and Welsh Cup saw him out score Gill in all competitions.

Gill and Davies remained a prolific partnership for the club in the 1922–23 season, with Davies scoring 19 league goals, two more than his teammate. Davies' tally included a hat-trick during a 6–1 victory over Chelsea in March 1923. He also scored six times in four matches as Cardiff retained their Welsh Cup title, including a hat-trick in a 10–0 win over Oswestry in the fourth round and the winning goal in the final during a 3–2 victory over Aberdare Athletic.

=== Near title miss and FA Cup finals ===
Davies began the 1923–24 season slowly, scoring once in his first five appearances although Cardiff scored ten times in the games. From 15 September to 27 October, he embarked on a scoring run, netting in six of the seven matches his side played, which included winning goals in two matches. On 10 November, he scored all of Cardiff's goals in a 4–2 victory over West Bromwich Albion. He went on to finish the campaign as the club's top goalscorer having scored 23 times in the league, a career high tally. However, his campaign was overshadowed by a missed penalty on the final day of the season. In their last game, Cardiff met Birmingham. If they won the game Cardiff would be guaranteed the First Division title. The match was goalless after 70 minutes, when a goal-bound shot from Gill was blocked by the hand of a Birmingham defender resulting in a penalty being given. The club's usual penalty taker Jack Evans had missed recent attempts, while Gill was reluctant to take it. Davies instead stepped in to take the first penalty of his senior career. His teammate Fred Keenor later described the attempt, noting "There is no doubt that the excitement and the knowledge that so much depended on the shot unnerved Len a little. Under ordinary circumstances it would have been a gift goal, but Len Davies muffed the kick and the ball rolled gently to the goalkeeper, who calmly gathered and made an easy clearance." The game eventually ended goalless while their nearest rivals Huddersfield Town won 3–0 and secured the title courtesy of goal average. The difference between the two sides, 0.024 of a goal remains the closest margin of victory ever recorded in the top tier of English football. Davies was said to be inconsolable following the miss.

He was again Cardiff's highest goalscorer the following year, netting 20 times despite suffering several injury problems that restricted him to 30 league appearances. However, his injury issues cost him a place in the squad for 1925 FA Cup final with Joe Nicholson starting in his place. His side went on to suffer defeat against Sheffield United. The signing of Hughie Ferguson in 1925 led to Davies being moved to an inside forward role and his scoring record fell as a result. He scored eight times during the 1925–26 season and seven the following year. In 1927, he was part of the Cardiff side that beat Arsenal to win the FA Cup Final, becoming the only side from outside England to have won the competition. The only goal of the game came as the opposition goalkeeper was unable to control a shot from Hughie Ferguson as Davies advanced on him. Two weeks after the final, Davies scored the opening goal in Cardiff's 2–0 win over Rhyl in the Welsh Cup final.

Davies remained with Cardiff until 1931, one year after finishing as the club's top scorer for the fifth time in the Football League. He missed the majority of his final season after undergoing surgery for appendicitis, before being released alongside Keenor. The pair both made their final appearance for the club in a goalless draw with Tottenham Hotspur on 6 April 1931. The club had suffered relegation to the Third Division South by the time of his departure. He remains the club's highest scorer with 179 goals in all competitions and also holds the club record for the most hat-tricks, scoring eight during his time in Cardiff.

=== Later career ===
He instead joined fellow Third Division South Side Thames. During only season with the club, they played his former side Cardiff which resulted in a clash of kit colours. Thames instead played in 11 of Davies' Welsh shirts which he had obtained on international duty. The match ended in a 9–2 defeat for his Thames side, a record league victory that still stands as of 2021 for his former club Cardiff. Thames finished bottom of the Third Division South in the 1931–32 season and the club was wound up at the end of the season. Davies instead joined Bangor City for the 1932–33 season, staying with the club until 1935 when he finished his playing career.

== International career ==
Davies made a goalscoring debut for Wales on 4 February 1922 in a 2–1 win over Scotland and was ever present for the side for a further three year, playing in every international fixture until 1925. In 1929, Davies was named in a Football Association of Wales XI that toured Canada. He was a prolific scorer during the tour, including scoring seven times in a single game during a match against a Lower Mainland XI. In total, Davies played 23 times for the Welsh national side, scoring six times and helping Wales to Home Championship titles in 1924 and 1928. His last game for Wales came on 20 November 1929 against England.

== Personal life ==
Davies met his future wife, Gwendoline Stroud, through his playing career as she was a fervent supporter of Cardiff. The pair married on 1 January 1923. After retiring from playing, Davies became a school sports coach at Mostyn House School, Parkgate, and later worked on an aircraft production line during World War II. He died of pneumonia in Prescot in 1945.

== Career statistics ==
Appearances and goals by club, season and competition
Club	Season	League			FA Cup		Welsh Cup		Other (Note: Includes other competitive competitions, including the FA Charity Shield and the East of Scotland Shield.)		Total	
Club	Season	Division	Apps	Goals	Apps	Goals	Apps	Goals	Apps	Goals	Apps	Goals
Cardiff City	1919–20	SL First Division	1	0	0	0	0	0	–		1	0
Cardiff City	1920–21	Second Division	3	0	0	0	1	1	–		4	1
Cardiff City	1921–22	First Division	25	17	6	5	4	8	–		35	30
Cardiff City	1922–23	First Division	27	19	4	3	4	6	–		35	28
Cardiff City	1923–24	First Division	38	23	6	1	3	0	–		47	24
Cardiff City	1924–25	First Division	30	20	4	2	0	0	–		34	22
Cardiff City	1925–26	First Division	37	8	1	1	0	0	–		38	9
Cardiff City	1926–27	First Division	34	7	7	3	5	5	–		46	15
Cardiff City	1927–28	First Division	37	15	3	1	5	4	1	1	46	21
Cardiff City	1928–29	First Division	27	8	0	0	4	2	–		31	10
Cardiff City	1929–30	Second Division	37	9	2	3	4	3	–		43	15
Cardiff City	1930–31	Second Division	10	2	0	0	2	2	–		12	4
Cardiff City	Total		306	128	33	19	32	31	1	1	372	179
Thames	1931–32	Third Division South	27	12	2	0	0	0	–		29	12
Total			333	140	35	19	32	31	1	1	401	189

=== International goals ===
Results list Wales' goal tally first.

Goal	Date	Venue	Opponent	Result	Competition
1.	4 February 1922	Racecourse Ground, Wrexham, Wales	Scotland	2–1	1921–22 British Home Championship
2.	1 April 1922	Windsor Park, Belfast, Northern Ireland	Ireland	1–1	1921–22 British Home Championship
3.	16 February 1924	Ninian Park, Cardiff, Wales	Scotland	2–0	1923–24 British Home Championship
4.	12 February 1927	Racecourse Ground, Wrexham, Wales	England	3–3	1926–27 British Home Championship
5.	12 February 1927	Racecourse Ground, Wrexham, Wales	England	3–3	1926–27 British Home Championship
6.	26 October 1929	Ninian Park, Cardiff, Wales	Scotland	2–4	1928–29 British Home Championship

== Honours ==
=== As a player ===
Cardiff City

- FA Cup: 1926–27
- FA Charity Shield: 1927
- Welsh Cup: 1922, 1923, 1927, 1928, 1930; runner-up: 1929
