= Pontypridd A.F.C. =

Former association football club in Wales

Pontypridd AFC
- Full name: Pontypridd Association Football Club
- Nickname: The Dragons
- Founded: 1911
- Dissolved: 1926
- Ground: Taff Vale Park
Home colours

Pontypridd Association Football Club was a Welsh professional association football team based in Pontypridd which existed between 1911 and 1926.

== History ==
The club was founded as a professional football club in 1911 to "promote first class association football in the Pontypridd District". The club were based at Taff Vale Park in the nearby community Trefforest. Pontypridd AFC played in the Southern League between 1911 and 1926.

The club also played in the Welsh League and were champions in the 1923–24 season. It was a finalist in the Welsh Cup in 1912, 1913 and 1921. The Dragons won the South Wales FA Senior Cup in 1925.

== Colours ==
The club wore black and white shirts with white knickers.

== Ground ==
The club played at the Taff Vale Park ground, in Treforest.
