= Jimmy Gill =

English footballer

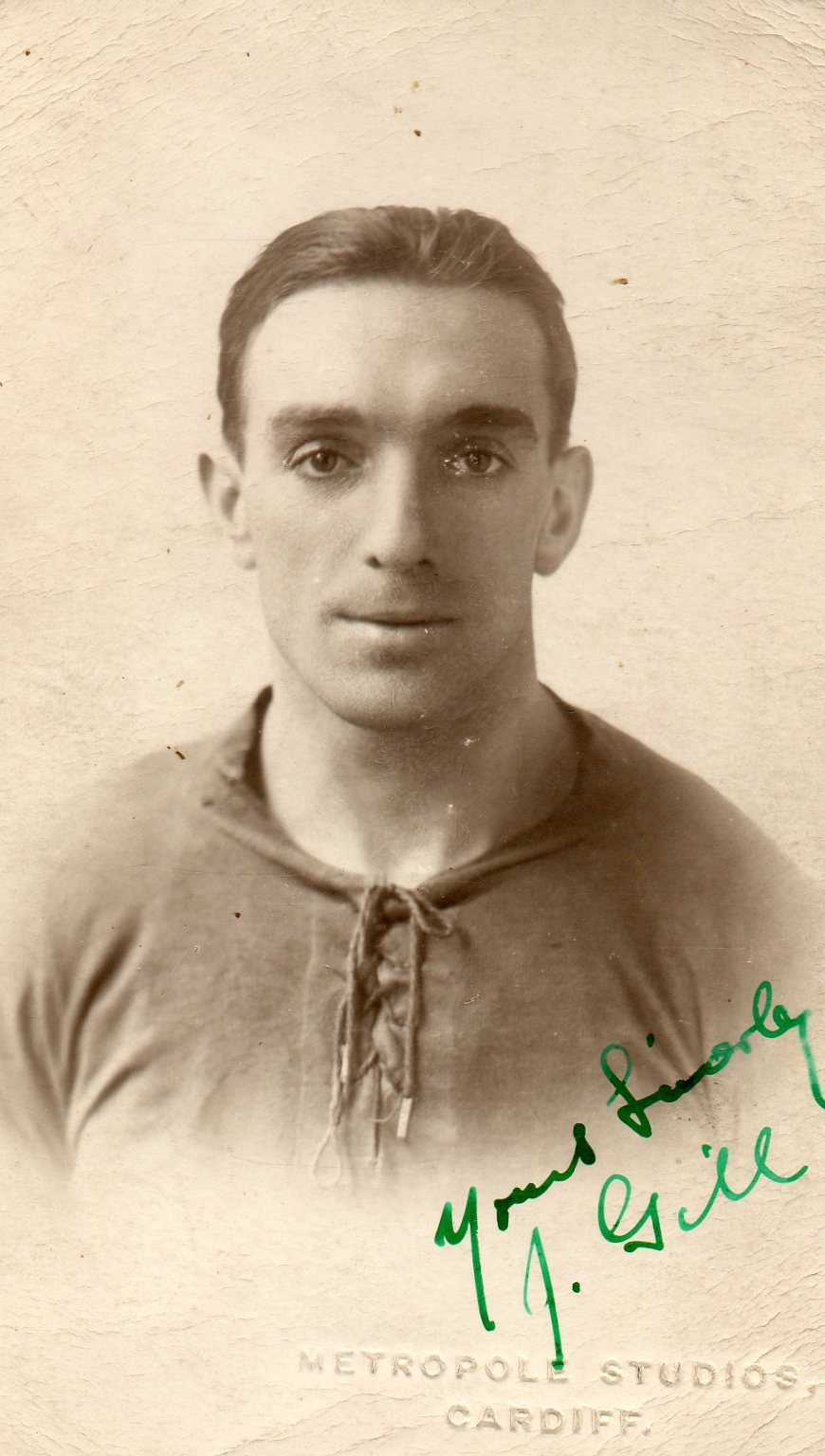

Personal information
- Full name: James Gill
- Date of birth: 9 November 1894
- Place of birth: Sheffield, England
- Date of death: 1964 (aged 69–70)
- Height: 5 ft 9 in (1.75 m)
- Position: Striker

Senior career*
| Years | Team | Apps | (Gls) |
| 1913–1920 | Sheffield Wednesday | 38 | (9) |
| 1920–1925 | Cardiff City | 184 | (82) |
| 1925 | Blackpool | 15 | (4) |
| 1925–1927 | Derby County | 63 | (35) |
| 1928–1929 | Crystal Palace | 10 | (3) |
- Scarborough
- * Club domestic league appearances and goals

James J. Gill (9 November 1894 – 1964) was an English professional footballer. He was born in Sheffield.

Gill began his career at hometown side Sheffield Wednesday in 1913. With the club suffering financial difficulties he was sold to Cardiff City in 1920 for £750 and was the club's top scorer in its first year in the Football League. He would go on to consistently challenge for the award along with strike partner Len Davies during his five years at the club. While at the club he also played in the 1925 FA Cup Final, which they went on to lose 1–0 to Sheffield United. The following season, he left to join Frank Buckley's Blackpool.

He made a scoring debut for Blackpool on 24 October 1925, in a 4–0 victory over Wolves at Bloomfield Road, netting the first goal. He made a further fourteen appearances during the 1925–26 league campaign, scoring three more goals. His final game for Blackpool occurred on 6 February 1926, in a 5–0 defeat at Port Vale.

Gill ended his career with spells at Derby County, Crystal Palace and Scarborough.

== Honours ==
Cardiff City

- FA Cup runner-up: 1924–25
