= 1919–20 Cardiff City F.C. season =

Welsh football club season

Cardiff City
1919–20 season
- Chairman: Dr Alex Brownlee
- Manager: Fred Stewart
- Southern League Division One: 4th
- FA Cup: 1st round
- Welsh Cup: Winners
- Top goalscorer: League: Billy Grimshaw (13); All: Arthur Cashmore (14)
- Highest home attendance: 25,000 (v Plymouth Argyle, 5 April 1920)
- Lowest home attendance: 6,000 (v Bristol Rovers, 1 September 1919)
- Average home league attendance: 14,613
Home colours

The 1919–20 season was Cardiff City F.C.'s 19th season of competitive football and the team's sixth and final one in the Southern Football League. They competed in the 22-team Southern Football League First Division, then the third tier of English football, finishing 4th. For the following season Cardiff were elected to the Football League Second Division following the creation of a new Third Division and the addition of two new places in the Second Division in the Football League.

== Season review ==
=== Southern Football League Division One ===
==== Partial league table ====
Pos	Team	Pld	W	D	L	GF	GA	GR	Pts	Qualification
2	Watford	42	26	6	10	69	42	1.643	58	Elected to the new Football League Third Division
3	Crystal Palace	42	22	12	8	69	43	1.605	56	Elected to the new Football League Third Division
4	Cardiff City	42	18	17	7	70	43	1.628	53	Elected to the Football League Second Division
5	Plymouth Argyle	42	20	10	12	57	29	1.966	50	Elected to the new Football League Third Division
6	Queens Park Rangers	42	18	10	14	62	50	1.240	46	Elected to the new Football League Third Division

Rules for classification: The system of using goal average to separate two teams tied on points was used up until the 1976-77 season. The points system: 2 points for a win, 1 point for a draw and 0 points for losing.

=== Results by round ===
Round	1	2	3	4	5	6	7	8	9	10	11	12	13	14	15	16	17	18	19	20	21	22	23	24	25	26	27	28	29	30	31	32	33	34	35	36	37	38	39	40	41	42
Ground	A	H	H	A	A	H	A	H	A	A	H	A	H	A	H	A	H	A	A	H	A	H	H	A	H	H	A	H	A	H	A	A	H	A	A	H	H	H	A	H	A	H
Result	L	D	W	D	D	W	L	W	D	D	D	W	W	W	L	D	W	D	D	W	W	W	W	D	W	W	D	W	D	W	L	D	D	L	D	L	W	L	D	W	D	W
Points	0	1	3	4	5	7	7	9	10	11	12	14	16	18	18	19	21	22	23	25	27	29	31	32	34	36	37	39	40	42	42	43	44	44	45	45	47	47	48	50	51	53
Position											10																		3													4

A = Away; H = Home; W = Win; D = Draw; L = Loss

== Players ==
First team squad.

Pos.	Nation	Player
GK	WAL	Charlie Hewitt
GK	ENG	Herbert Kneeshaw
DF	ENG	Albert Barnett
DF	ENG	Charlie Brittain
DF	ENG	Patrick Cassidy
DF	ENG	Henry Harvey
DF	WAL	Fred Keenor
DF	ENG	Edward Layton
DF	EIR	Bert Smith
MF	ENG	Billy Hardy

Pos.	Nation	Player
FW	ENG	George Beare
FW	ENG	Arthur Cashmore
FW	ENG	Joe Clark
FW	SCO	Billy Cox
FW	WAL	Len Davies
FW	ENG	Billy Devlin
FW	WAL	Jack Evans
FW	ENG	Billy Grimshaw
FW	ENG	Len Hopkins
FW	ENG	George West

== Fixtures and results ==
=== Southern League Division One ===
30 August 1919 1	Reading	2–0	Cardiff City	Reading
	Goal			Stadium: Elm Park; Attendance: 8,000

1 September 1919 2	Cardiff City	4–4	Bristol Rovers	Cardiff
	Billy Grimshaw; Billy Grimshaw; Charlie Jones; Jack Evans		Goal	Stadium: Ninian Park; Attendance: 6,000

6 September 1919 3	Cardiff City	3–0	Southampton	Cardiff
	Fred Keenor; George West; Jack Evans			Stadium: Ninian Park; Attendance: 11,000

9 September 1919 4	Bristol Rovers	0–0	Cardiff City	Bristol
				Stadium: Eastville; Attendance: 7,500

13 September 1919 5	Luton Town	2–2	Cardiff City	Luton
	Dai Williams; Jack Rutherford	Luton report	47', 78' Billy Grimshaw	Stadium: Kenilworth Road; Attendance: 10,000; Referee: RR Crump (London)

20 September 1919 6	Cardiff City	5–0	Gillingham	Cardiff
	Billy Grimshaw; Billy Grimshaw; Jack Evans; Jack Evans; Billy Devlin			Stadium: Ninian Park; Attendance: 12,500

27 September 1919 7	Swansea Town	2–1	Cardiff City	Swansea
	Fred Sheldon; Fred Sheldon		Jack Evans	Stadium: Vetch Field; Attendance: 15,500

4 October 1919 8	Cardiff City	1–0	Exeter City	Cardiff
	Billy Cox			Stadium: Ninian Park; Attendance: 12,500

11 October 1919 9	Watford	0–0	Cardiff City	Watford
				Stadium: Vicarage Road; Attendance: 8,000

18 October 1919 10	Queens Park Rangers	0–0	Cardiff City	London
				Stadium: Loftus Road; Attendance: 10,000

25 October 1919 11	Cardiff City	3–3	Swindon Town	Cardiff
	Joe Clark; Joe Clark; Billy Cox		Harold Fleming; Dave Rogers; Matty Lochhead	Stadium: Ninian Park; Attendance: 13,500

1 November 1919 12	Millwall	1–2	Cardiff City	London
	Goal		Billy Grimshaw; Billy Grimshaw	Stadium: The Den; Attendance: 12,000

8 November 1919 13	Cardiff City	2–0	Brighton & Hove Albion	Cardiff
	Henry Harvey; Billy Grimshaw			Stadium: Ninian Park; Attendance: 14,000

15 November 1919 14	Newport County	1–3	Cardiff City	Newport
	Richards		George West; Bert Smith; Len Hopkins	Stadium: Somerton Park; Attendance: 10,500

22 November 1919 15	Cardiff City	0–1	Portsmouth	Cardiff
			Goal	Stadium: Ninian Park; Attendance: 16,000

29 November 1919 16	Northampton Town	2–2	Cardiff City	Northampton
	Goal		Billy Grimshaw; George West	Stadium: County Ground; Attendance: 7,000

6 December 1919 17	Cardiff City	2–1	Crystal Palace	Cardiff
	Jack Evans; Arthur Cashmore		Goal	Stadium: Ninian Park; Attendance: 13,000

13 December 1919 18	Southend United	1–1	Cardiff City	Southend
	Goal		Arthur Cashmore	Stadium: Roots Hall; Attendance: 9,000

25 December 1919 19	Merthyr Town	1–1	Cardiff City	Merthyr Tydfil
	Goal		Arthur Cashmore	Stadium: Penydarren Park; Attendance: 10,000

26 December 1919 20	Cardiff City	3–2	Merthyr Town	Cardiff
	George Beare; Jack Evans; Chamberlain (o.g.)		Goal	Stadium: Ninian Park; Attendance: 18,000

27 December 1919 21	Brentford	1–2	Cardiff City	London
	Alfred Thompson		Jack Evans; Arthur Cashmore	Stadium: Griffin Park; Attendance: 10,000

1 January 1920 22	Cardiff City	1–0	Norwich City	Cardiff
	Billy Hardy			Stadium: Ninian Park; Attendance: 14,000

3 January 1920 23	Cardiff City	4–0	Reading	Cardiff
	Joe Clark; Joe Clark; Billy Cox; Billy Cox			Stadium: Ninian Park; Attendance: 15,000

17 January 1920 24	Southampton	2–2	Cardiff City	Southampton
	James Moore; Tom Parker		Arthur Cashmore; George Beare	Stadium: The Dell; Attendance: 10,000

24 January 1920 25	Cardiff City	2–1	Luton Town	Cardiff
	Arthur Cashmore; George West	Luton report	Ernie Simms	Stadium: Ninian Park; Attendance: 15,000; Referee: WR David (Reading)

7 February 1920 26	Cardiff City	1–0	Swansea Town	Cardiff
	George Beare			Stadium: Ninian Park; Attendance: 21,371

14 February 1920 27	Exeter City	1–1	Cardiff City	Exeter
	Goal		Joe Clark	Stadium: St James Park; Attendance: 8,000

28 February 1920 28	Cardiff City	4–0	Queens Park Rangers	Cardiff
	George Beare; George Beare; Arthur Cashmore; George West			Stadium: Ninian Park; Attendance: 17,000

6 March 1920 29	Swindon Town	2–2	Cardiff City	Swindon
	Bertie Davies; Dave Rogers		Arthur Cashmore; Arthur Cashmore	Stadium: County Ground; Attendance: 9,000

13 March 1920 30	Cardiff City	4–2	Millwall	Cardiff
	Billy Grimshaw; Billy Grimshaw; George West; Joe Clark		Goal	Stadium: Ninian Park; Attendance: 12,000

16 March 1920 31	Gillingham	3–0	Cardiff City	Gillingham
	Goal			Stadium: Priestfield Stadium; Attendance: 8,000

20 March 1920 32	Brighton & Hove Albion	1–1	Cardiff City	Brighton
	Goal		Arthur Cashmore	Stadium: Goldstone Ground; Attendance: 13,000

27 March 1920 33	Cardiff City	0–0	Newport County	Cardiff
				Stadium: Ninian Park; Attendance: 20,000

2 April 1920 34	Plymouth Argyle	1–0	Cardiff City	Plymouth
	David Jack			Stadium: Home Park; Attendance: 19,000

3 April 1920 35	Portsmouth	0–0	Cardiff City	Portsmouth
				Stadium: Fratton Park; Attendance: 24,606

5 April 1920 36	Cardiff City	0–2	Plymouth Argyle	Cardiff
			George Sheffield; George Sheffield	Stadium: Ninian Park; Attendance: 25,000

10 April 1920 37	Cardiff City	6–1	Northampton Town	Cardiff
	Len Hopkins; Len Hopkins; Billy Grimshaw; George West; Fred Keenor; Jack Evans		Goal	Stadium: Ninian Park; Attendance: 12,000

14 April 1920 38	Cardiff City	0–1	Watford	Cardiff
			Goal	Stadium: Ninian Park; Attendance: 11,000

17 April 1920 39	Crystal Palace	1–1	Cardiff City	London
	Goal		Arthur Cashmore	Stadium: Selhurst Park; Attendance: 16,000

24 April 1920 40	Cardiff City	1–0	Southend United	Cardiff
	George West			Stadium: Ninian Park; Attendance: 16,000

29 April 1920 41	Norwich City	1–1	Cardiff City	Norwich
	Goal		George West	Stadium: Carrow Road; Attendance: 5,000

1 May 1920 42	Cardiff City	2–0	Brentford	Cardiff
	Jack Evans; Arthur Cashmore			Stadium: Ninian Park; Attendance: 12,000

=== FA Cup ===
10 January 1920 Round 1	Cardiff City	2–0	Oldham Athletic	Cardiff
	George West; Jack Evans			Stadium: Ninian Park; Attendance: 21,921

31 January 1920 Round 2	Wolverhampton Wanderers	1–2	Cardiff City	Wolverhampton
	Goal		George Beare; Bert Smith	Stadium: Molineux; Attendance: 36,475

21 February 1920 Round 3	Bristol City	2–1	Cardiff City	Bristol
	Bert Neesam; Tommy Howarth		George Beare	Stadium: Ashton Gate; Attendance: 32,452

=== Welsh Cup ===
14 January 1920 Round 3	Cardiff City	5–0	Merthyr Town	Cardiff
	Henry Harvey; Billy Cox; Joe Clark; Joe Clark; Joe Clark			Stadium: Ninian Park; Attendance: 5,500

11 February 1920 Round 4	Cardiff City	5–0	Chester City	Cardiff
	Fred Keenor; Jack Evans; Bert Smith; Arthur Cashmore; Arthur Cashmore			Stadium: Ninian Park; Attendance: 4,000

24 March 1920 Semi Final	Cardiff City	2–1	Swansea Town	Cardiff
	George West; Jack Evans		Ben Beynon	Stadium: Ninian Park; Attendance: 7,000

21 April 1920 Final	Wrexham	1–2	Cardiff City	Wrexham
	Goal		George West; George West	Stadium: The Racecourse; Attendance: 10,000
