= 1920–21 Cardiff City F.C. season =

Welsh football club season

Cardiff City
1920–21 season
- Chairman: Dr Alex Brownlee; (until September 1920); Walter Riden
- Manager: Fred Stewart
- Second Division: 2nd
- FA Cup: Semi-final
- Welsh Cup: Third round
- Top goalscorer: League: Jimmy Gill (19); All: Jimmy Gill (20)
- Highest home attendance: 42,000 vs. Coventry City (27 December 1920); 42,000 vs. Bristol City (22 January 1921)
- Lowest home attendance: 20,000 vs. Leicester City (13 November 1920); 20,000 vs. Barnsley (9 March 1922)
- Average home league attendance: 28,000
Home colours

The 1920–21 season was the 20th year (Note: Cardiff City were founded in 1899 but missed the entrance date of the Cardiff & District League in their first year.) of competitive football played by Cardiff City F.C. and the team's first in the Football League. In a ballot by members of their new league, Cardiff were voted into the Second Division and won their first match 5–2 against Stockport County. Cardiff finished the season tied on points with first-placed Birmingham, with 58 of a possible 84 points. The winner was therefore decided via goal average, with Cardiff placing second by a margin of 0.235. The two sides were both promoted to the First Division.Cardiff also reached the semi-final of the FA Cup, becoming the first Welsh side to do so and keeping six consecutive clean sheets in the process. The team caused two upsets by defeating First Division sides Sunderland and Chelsea in the first and fourth rounds respectively. They were eliminated from the competition by fellow Second Division side Wolverhampton Wanderers, losing 3–1 in a replay at Old Trafford. In the Welsh Cup, Cardiff were the holders entering the competition but were eliminated in the third round by Pontypridd after a fixture clash with a league match against Bristol City forced them to field a reserve side.

During the season, Cardiff used 29 players in all competitions. Billy Hardy featured in more games than any other player, being ever present in both the league and FA Cup with 49 appearances. He missed only one senior match for the side, the club's Welsh Cup defeat. Forward Jimmy Gill, signed at the start of the season, was the club's top goalscorer. He scored 20 times in all competitions, finishing the campaign eight goals clear of the next highest-scoring player, Arthur Cashmore. The club attracted an average home attendance at Ninian Park of more than 28,000 for their first season in the Football League, an increase from previous years in the Southern League. Home matches against Coventry City and Bristol City both recorded season-high league attendances of 42,000, although an FA Cup tie against Chelsea attracted 50,000.

== Background and preseason ==
In 1910, Cardiff City entered the Southern Football League, giving up their amateur status and becoming a professional football club that year. In the 1919–20 season they finished fourth in the Southern League's First Division. The Football League, a rival competition to the Southern League at the time, was expanding, and absorbed the teams from the Southern League's First Division to form a new Football League Third Division. The Southern League had suffered several blows in the years prior with London-based sides Tottenham Hotspur, West Ham United and Fulham all moving into the Football League.

Cardiff's founder Bartley Wilson, along with the club's committee, prepared an application to become one of two sides that would enter the Football League Second Division in place of the two teams that finished at the bottom of the league the previous season. Votes were cast on the decision by members of the Football League; Leeds United, looking to replace Leeds City, a team that had dropped out of the Football League after eight matches the previous year, led the ballot with 31 votes. Cardiff were second with 23 votes, beating out their nearest rival, relegated side Grimsby Town by 3 votes. Lincoln City received only 7 votes while Rochdale and Chesterfield withdrew their applications before the voting. Cardiff's election meant that they were placed in a higher division than the three sides that had finished above them, Portsmouth, Watford and Crystal Palace. The decision proved controversial, particularly at Portsmouth, who had ended the season as champions. The Southern Football League also fined Cardiff £500 for providing insufficient notice of their departure from the competition.

Manager Fred Stewart, appointed in 1913, remained in charge. He maintained the core of his side from the previous season. The most prominent signing made before the start of the new campaign was forward Jimmy Gill, who was signed from The Wednesday for £750. Other new signings included Herbie Evans from local side Cardiff Corinthians, goalkeeper Ben Davies from Middlesbrough, Tom Sayles from Sheffield, Ernie Gault and Jack Page from Everton and Laurence Abrams from Chelsea.

Stewart also allowed defenders Patrick Cassidy and Kidder Harvey to leave the club, surprising many fans and local journalists given the two players' experience. The pair, alongside Billy Hardy, had formed part of the "holy three", as they were known by fans in the Southern League; however, the emergence of Fred Keenor hastened their departure.

The club announced a significant rise in ticket prices ahead of the new season, citing the increase in travelling and rail fares that would be required in the new division. At the annual general meeting on 16 August, plans for £20,000 worth of improvements to be made to the club's home ground, Ninian Park, to cope with spectator demand were authorised. Although the alterations would stretch into the season, the ground would have an initial capacity of 35,000 for the start of the campaign. Dr. Alex Brownlee, the club chairman who presided over the meeting, left his post one month later and was replaced by Walter Riden. Cardiff held their only preseason fixture on 18 August, with the first team squad being split into two sides to face each other at Ninian Park, where they played out a 2–2 draw.

== Football League Second Division ==
=== August–December ===
Cardiff was handed an away fixture in their first Football League match, facing Stewart's former club Stockport County. Considered underdogs against the more experienced side, Cardiff secured a 5–2 victory with two goals from new signing Gill and one each from Jack Evans, Billy Grimshaw and Keenor. The performance led The Times to describe the win as "one of the best performances of the day" in the Football League. The team's second match was the first Football League tie held at Ninian Park as 25,000 fans witnessed a goalless draw with Clapton Orient. The first home victory at the ground came in the team's following match, when they recorded a 3–0 win over Stockport in the reverse fixture, a week after their first meeting. At the time, the Football League used Charles Sutcliffe's fixture system that paired club's home and away matches against the same side on consecutive weekends or in close proximity wherever possible. The club's previous season's top goalscorer Arthur Cashmore opened the scoring, becoming the first player to score a Football League goal at Ninian Park, before Grimshaw added a brace. Cardiff suffered their first defeat in the Football League in the reverse fixture against Clapton Orient on 6 September, losing 2–0.

The side recovered to claim a win and a draw in consecutive fixtures against Birmingham in their following two matches, with Gill scoring in both games. Another set of successive fixtures followed against West Ham United with the two sides having identical records before the matches. In keeping with this form, both games ended in draws: the first match, at Ninian Park, ended 0–0, and the second resulted in a 1–1 draw with Gill maintaining his early season form by scoring his fifth goal of the campaign. Cardiff remained unbeaten throughout the rest of October, recording two 3–0 victories over Fulham, home and away, and a win and a draw against Notts County. After victory in the first fixture against Notts County, a match they were widely expected to struggle in, Cardiff led the division with 11 matches played. A subsequent draw and a loss against Leicester City allowed South Shields to overtake them.

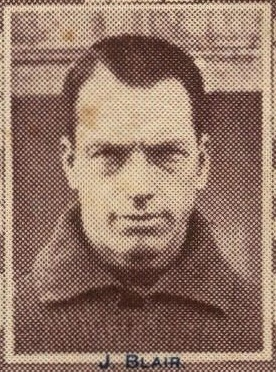
Jimmy Blair was signed from The Wednesday in November 1920 for a club record fee.

The return fixture against Leicester was won 2–0 following goals from Cashmore and Gill, in front of a joint season-low home crowd of 20,000. Soon after, Cardiff secured a 4–2 victory over Blackpool at Bloomfield Road. Prior to the victory, Cardiff broke their record transfer fee to sign Scottish international full back Jimmy Blair from The Wednesday for £3,500, also a record fee for a full back at the time. Blair made his debut for the club in the match, replacing Albert Barnett, and remained first choice throughout the rest of the season. After a 0–0 draw at home against Blackpool, Blair returned to face his former club Wednesday and helped his new side record consecutive 1–0 victories, with both matches being decided by goals from George West. Their form prompted The Times to report that the side were playing with "great determination" to win promotion to the First Division. The victories returned Cardiff to the top of the table and their position was further strengthened by a 2–1 win over Bury, despite rivals Birmingham recording their tenth win in a row. Cardiff defeated Coventry City 4–2 on Christmas Day in a match that recorded a joint season-high home attendance of 42,000 and left the side leading the division having lost only two matches in the first half of the campaign. However, a 1–0 defeat in the return fixture two days later allowed Bristol City to move into first place on goal average and Birmingham to move within one point of the pair at the end of the calendar year.

=== January–May ===
Cardiff endured a poor start to 1921, losing 1–0 to Bury on New Year's Day and then drawing 0–0 with promotion rivals Bristol City on 15 January. With that draw, Birmingham overtook the pair to go top. Cardiff faced Bristol City again in their next fixture with goalkeeper Herbert Kneeshaw missing his first match of the season after suffering a cheek injury; his replacement, Ben Davies, went on to feature in all of the club's remaining fixtures. The match with Bristol City attracted an attendance of around 42,000, the joint highest home crowd of the season at Ninian Park. Although Cardiff defeated their Severnside rivals 1–0 with Barnett scoring the only goal, a loss to Stoke on 5 February saw Cardiff drop to third place. A 2–0 win over Barnsley, with goals from Gill and debutant Harry Nash, and a goalless draw with Stoke were not enough to stop the side slipping to fourth place soon after. In the team's last fixture in February, Cardiff defeated Nottingham Forest 2–1, leaving them tied with Bristol City and Blackpool for second place on 38 points and 2 points behind leaders Birmingham. Concerned about his side's lack of goals, Stewart, who had already signed Nash in an attempt to remedy the problem, brought in forward Fred Pagnam in March from First Division side Arsenal for £3,000. Although Pagnam scored on his debut as Cardiff defeated Barnsley 3–2, they suffered consecutive defeats for the first time during the campaign, losing 2–0 against Rotherham County and 2–1 against Port Vale in their next two fixtures. The defeats resulted in Cardiff falling five points behind leaders Birmingham, although their prolonged FA Cup run had left them with three games in hand.

Two days after losing to Port Vale, Pagnam helped the side return to winning ways by scoring the only goal in a victory over Leeds United on 28 March, although the match was marred by Barnett suffering a broken leg that ended his season. In order to make up their games in hand, Cardiff played the return fixture against Leeds the following day. Pagnam again scored, this time alongside Keenor in a 2–1 win. These victories were the start of an improved run of form highlighted by Cardiff winning six of their following seven matches: having defeated Leeds, Cardiff drew 0–0 with Port Vale, and then won four consecutive matches, defeating Nottingham Forest 3–0 and recording 1–0 wins over South Shields (twice) and Rotherham. Their form brought them back into contention for the league title and, despite picking up only one point from two matches against Hull City at the end of April, Cardiff went into the final two league fixtures tied on points with league leaders Birmingham who led on goal average as determined by the number of goals scored being divided by the number of goals conceded. Bristol City were four points behind the pair, meaning each of them needed a point from their remaining two fixtures to guarantee promotion to the First Division. (Note: 2 points were awarded for a win at the time.) Cardiff's final two matches of the season were against Wolverhampton Wanderers, the side that had eliminated them from the semi-finals of the FA Cup two months earlier. In the first fixture, held at Ninian Park, 40,000 spectators witnessed Cardiff seal promotion with a 2–0 win, with Gill and Pagnam the scorers. Cardiff's promotion had already been guaranteed by a draw between The Wednesday and Bristol City earlier in the day and the club's directors let in much of the capacity crowd for free in celebration. Gill and Pagnam were on the scoresheet again, along with Nash, to record a 3–1 win in the reverse match on 7 May. Despite winning both fixtures, Cardiff ultimately finished second to Birmingham on goal average by 0.235. Their rivals' superior scoring record in home fixtures ultimately proved decisive with the champions scoring over 20 goals more than Cardiff in those matches. Keenor later described the confusion at the end of the final match as the team waited for news on which side had won the league, commenting "we waited anxiously in the dressing room for the result of the Birmingham match. It seemed hours before the result came through... this went on for 15 minutes, when a reporter walked in with the information that Birmingham were champions."

=== Match results ===
==== Key ====
- In result column, Cardiff City's score shown first
- H = Home match
- A = Away match
- pen. = Penalty kick
- o.g. = Own goal

==== Results ====
Date	Opponents	Result	Goalscorers	Attendance
28 August 1920	Stockport County (A)	5–2	J. Evans, Gill (2), Grimshaw, Keenor	13,000
30 August 1920	Clapton Orient (H)	0–0		25,000
4 September 1920	Stockport County (H)	3–0	Cashmore, Grimshaw (2)	22,000
6 September 1920	Clapton Orient (A)	0–2		12,000
11 September 1920	Birmingham (H)	2–1	Gill, Cashmore	30,000
18 September 1920	Birmingham (A)	1–1	Gill	45,000
25 September 1920	West Ham United (H)	0–0		30,000
2 October 1920	West Ham United (A)	1–1	Gill	26,000
9 October 1920	Fulham (A)	3–0	Beare, Gill, West	28,000
16 October 1920	Fulham (H)	3–0	Cashmore (2), Keenor	25,000
23 October 1920	Notts County (A)	2–1	Cashmore, Gill	22,000
30 October 1920	Notts County (H)	1–1	Gill	30,000
6 November 1920	Leicester City (A)	0–2		21,000
13 November 1920	Leicester City (H)	2–0	Cashmore, Gill	20,000
20 November 1920	Blackpool (A)	4–2	Gill, West, Cashmore, Baker (o.g.)	10,000
27 November 1920	Blackpool (H)	0–0		28,000
4 December 1920	The Wednesday (A)	1–0	West	12,000
11 December 1920	The Wednesday (H)	1–0	West	28,500
18 December 1920	Bury (H)	2–1	Gill, Cashmore	27,500
25 December 1920	Coventry City (A)	4–2	Gill (2), Cashmore, Beare	22,000
27 December 1920	Coventry City (H)	0–1		42,000
1 January 1921	Bury (A)	1–3	Cashmore	25,000
15 January 1921	Bristol City (A)	0–0		35,000
22 January 1921	Bristol City (H)	1–0	Barnett	42,000
5 February 1921	Stoke (H)	0–1		27,000
12 February 1921	Barnsley (A)	2–0	Gill, Nash	17,000
14 February 1921	Stoke (A)	0–0		15,000
26 February 1921	Nottingham Forest (A)	2–1	Gill, Keenor	22,000
9 March 1921	Barnsley (H)	3–2	Gill, Beare, Pagnam	20,000
12 March 1921	Rotherham County (A)	0–2		18,000
26 March 1921	Port Vale (H)	1–2	Grimshaw	30,000
28 March 1921	Leeds United (H)	1–0	Pagnam	25,000
29 March 1921	Leeds United (A)	2–1	Pagnam, Keenor	20,000
2 April 1921	Port Vale (A)	0–0		18,000
4 April 1921	Nottingham Forest (H)	3–0	Pagnam (2), S. Evans	27,000
9 April 1921	South Shields (H)	1–0	Gill	30,000
11 April 1921	Rotherham County (H)	1–0	Pagnam	30,000
16 April 1921	South Shields (A)	1–0	Hardy	17,000
23 April 1921	Hull City (H)	0–0		30,000
30 April 1921	Hull City (A)	0–2		10,000
2 May 1921	Wolverhampton Wanderers (H)	2–0	Gill, Pagnam	40,000
7 May 1921	Wolverhampton Wanderers (A)	3–1	Pagnam, Nash, Gill	10,000

=== Partial league table ===
Pos	Team	Pld	W	D	L	GF	GA	GAv	Pts	Promotion or relegation
1	Birmingham (C, P)	42	24	10	8	79	38	2.079	58	Promotion to the Frst Division
2	Cardiff City (P)	42	24	10	8	59	32	1.844	58	Promotion to the Frst Division
3	Bristol City	42	19	13	10	49	29	1.690	51	
4	Blackpool	42	20	10	12	54	42	1.286	50	
5	West Ham United	42	19	10	13	51	30	1.700	48	

(C) Champions; (P) Promoted

== Cup matches ==
=== FA Cup ===
Cardiff entered the FA Cup in the first round, being drawn against First Division side Sunderland. The match was played at Roker Park in front of a crowd of 41,923 on 8 January 1921. Cardiff caused an upset by winning 1–0 following a goal from George Beare. In a reversal of fortune in the following round, Cardiff were seen as favourites after being drawn against Third Division side Brighton & Hove Albion. They were unable to make their higher ranking count as they were held to a goalless draw at Brighton's Goldstone Ground. In the replay, a single goal from Cashmore was enough to see Cardiff through to the third round. A third consecutive away draw followed, as Cardiff defeated Third Division Southampton 1–0 at The Dell after a goal from Gill.

The club's victory over Southampton meant that, for the first time in their history, Cardiff had reached the fourth round of the FA Cup. The team were drawn against First Division side Chelsea, who would be playing their eighth match in the competition, having been taken to two replays by both Reading and Plymouth Argyle in the first and third rounds respectively. Chelsea's difficulty in overcoming opponents in the previous rounds meant that the match was seen as a closer contest than the divisional gap suggested. A crowd of 50,000 attended the match at Ninian Park. After Cardiff took an early lead through Cashmore's second goal in the competition, they proceeded to defend resolutely throughout the remainder of the match, holding their lead for the rest of the game. Their defensive line of Blair, Charlie Brittain and Keenor received significant praise in match reports.

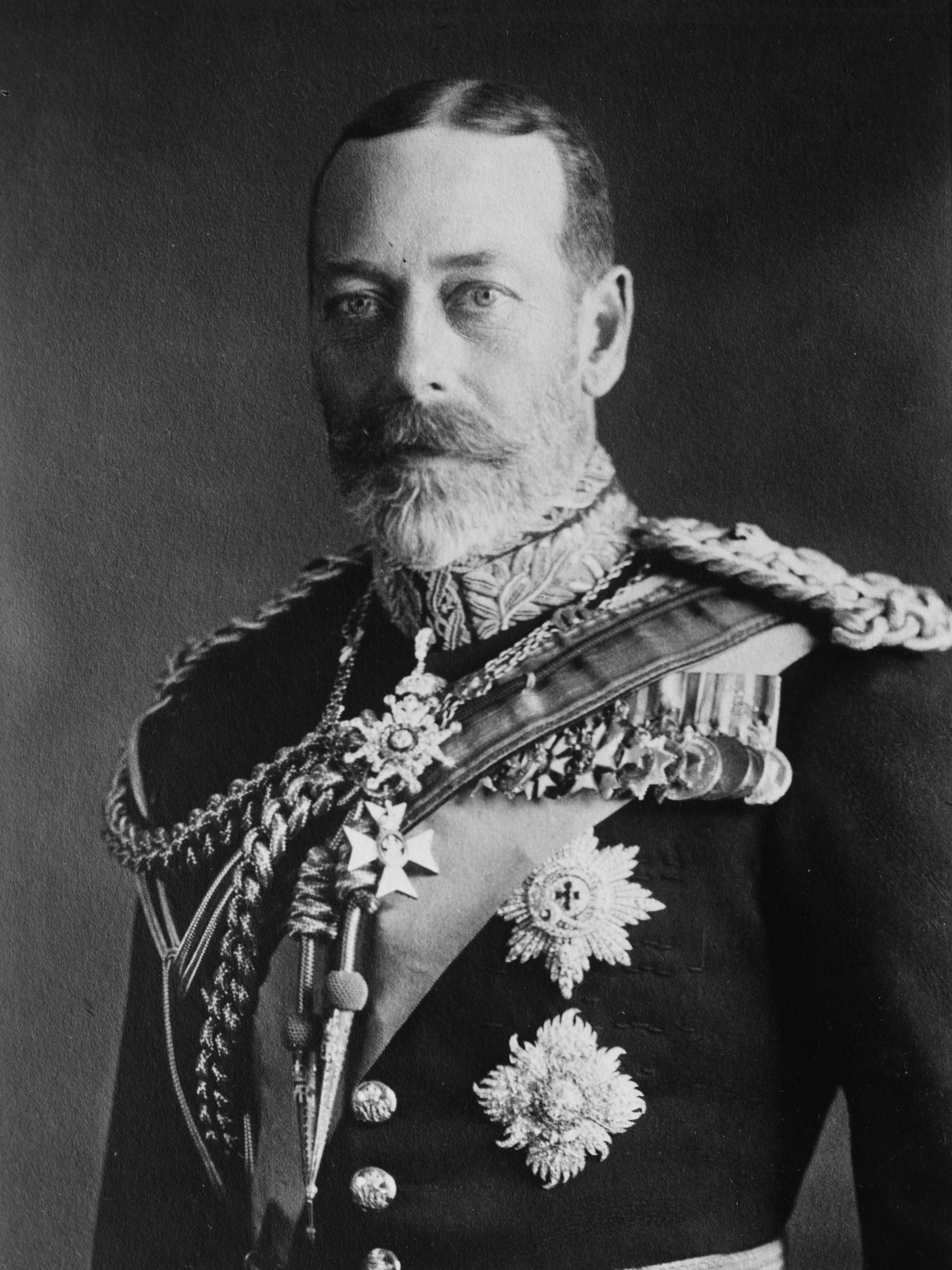
George V attended his first football match when Cardiff played Wolverhampton Wanderers in the semi-final of the FA Cup.

Cardiff's victory over Chelsea resulted in the side becoming the first Welsh team ever to reach the semi-final stage in the competition's history. The draw for the semi-final saw Cardiff paired with fellow Second Division side Wolverhampton Wanderers. As semi-final ties are traditionally held at a neutral venue, the match was played at Anfield, the home ground of Liverpool, on 19 March. The match was also the first football game ever attended by King George V and Queen Mary. Their only daughter, Princess Mary, was also present at the match. The game was described in The Times as a defensive affair: fewer than half-a-dozen shots were taken, and the game ended in a goalless draw, necessitating a replay. This was blamed on the pitch, which was greasy because of the heavy rain that fell throughout the day, and which cut up badly as the game wore on. Wolves were adjudged to have been the stronger of the two sides while Evans was adjudged to be Cardiff's most impressive attacking player. Cardiff's defence was praised after recording their sixth consecutive clean sheet in the competition. Around 42,000 fans attended the fixture resulting in £3,500 of receipts in one of the highest gates the club drew during the season.

The replay was held at Old Trafford, the home ground of Manchester United, four days later. Although Cardiff's defence had not conceded a goal in the competition to this point, they were breached after just 12 minutes. Wolves added a second goal before half-time; Cardiff pulled one goal back when they were awarded a penalty for handball that was converted by Keenor. This led to a brief upsurge in performance as the side looked for an equalising goal. Multiple long shots were defended by Wolves who added a third goal soon after and ended the winners as the match finished 3–1. Around 45,000 spectators attended the replay, yielding gate receipts of £4,270. Wolves went on to lose the final 2–1 against First Division side Tottenham Hotspur at Stamford Bridge.

==== Match results ====
===== Key =====
- In result column, Cardiff City's score shown first
- H = Home match
- A = Away match
- N = Neutral venue
- pen. = Penalty kick
- o.g. = Own goal

===== Results =====
Date	Round	Opponents	Result	Goalscorers	Attendance
8 January 1921	First	Sunderland (A)	1–0	Beare	41,923
29 January 1921	Second	Brighton & Hove Albion (A)	0–0		20,269
2 February 1921	Second (replay)	Brighton & Hove Albion (H)	1–0	Cashmore	31,000
19 February 1921	Third	Southampton (A)	1–0	Gill	21,363
5 March 1921	Fourth	Chelsea (H)	1–0	Cashmore	50,000
19 March 1921	Semi-final	Wolverhampton Wanderers (N)	0–0		42,000
23 March 1921	Semi-final (replay)	Wolverhampton Wanderers (N)	1–3	Keenor (pen.)	45,000

=== Welsh Cup ===
Cardiff entered the competition as reigning holders having won the trophy for the second time in their history in April 1920 after defeating Wrexham 2–0. The side's first match was in the third round. They were drawn against Pontypridd. However, the match was scheduled for 15 January 1921, the same day that Cardiff were due to play Bristol City in the Second Division. Both matches went ahead on the same date with the first team playing in the league and a team made up of reserve and fringe players travelling to Pontypridd. The weakened side suffered a 2–1 defeat with Cardiff's goal being scored by Len Davies.

==== Match results ====
===== Key =====
- In result column, Cardiff City's score shown first
- H = Home match
- A = Away match
- pen. = Penalty kick
- o.g. = Own goal

===== Results =====
Date	Round	Opponents	Result	Goalscorers	Attendance
15 January 1921	Third	Pontypridd (A)	1–2	L. Davies	2,000

== Players ==
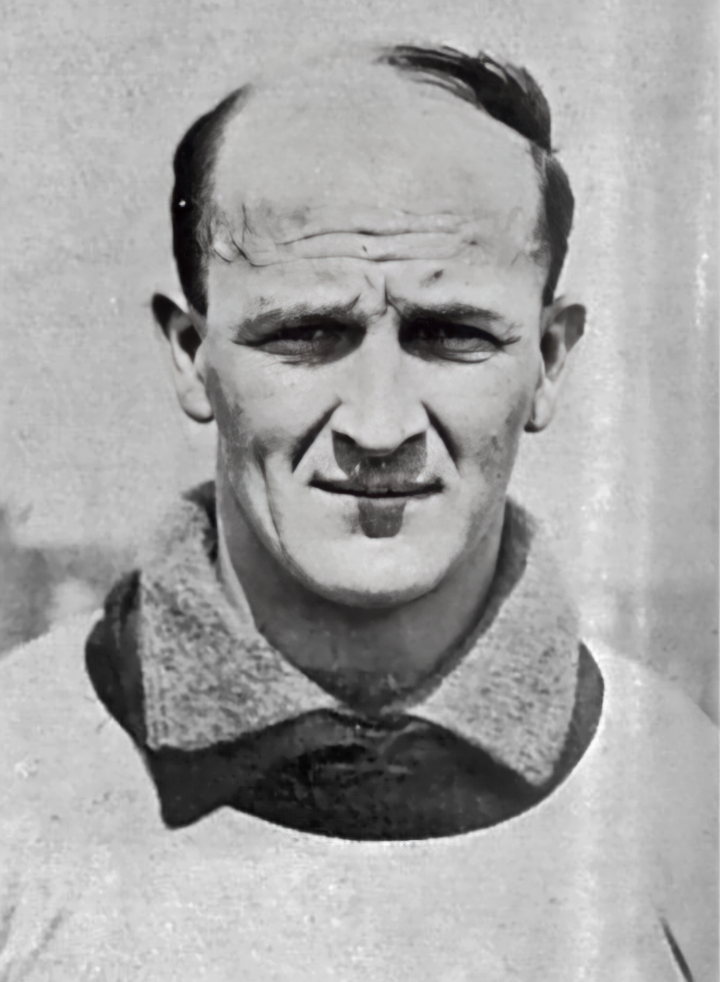
Billy Hardy made more appearances for the club during the season than any other player.

Manager Fred Stewart used a total of 29 players in all competitions during the season. Hardy made the most appearances of any player, featuring in all 42 league and 7 FA Cup matches; the only senior match he did not feature in was the club's fixture clash in the Welsh Cup. Bert Smith, Keenor, Gill and Brittain were the only other players to play 40 or more matches. The Welsh Cup fixture clash provided Len Hopkins, Tom Sayles and Tommy Wilmott with their only appearances of the season. Gill was the club's top scorer, scoring 19 times in the Second Division and 1 goal in the FA Cup. Cashmore, the previous season's top scorer, was the only other player to reach double figures, scoring 12 times in all competitions. Despite joining the club with only three months of the season remaining, Pagnam was the third highest scorer having scored 8 goals in 14 appearances. In total, 11 players scored at least one goal during the campaign. Len Davies' goal against Pontypridd in the Welsh Cup was the first goal of his senior career. He would go on to become Cardiff's all-time leading goalscorer with 128 goals in all competitions.

Player statistics
Player	Position	Second Division		FA Cup		Welsh Cup		Total	
Player	Position	Apps	Goals	Apps	Goals	Apps	Goals	Apps	Goals
Laurence Abrams	HB	1	0	0	0	1	0	2	0
Albert Barnett	DF	16	0	5	0	0	0	21	0
George Beare	FW	23	3	7	1	0	0	30	4
Jimmy Blair	DF	25	0	7	0	0	0	32	0
Charlie Brittain	DF	35	0	7	0	0	0	42	0
Arthur Cashmore	FW	26	10	7	2	0	0	33	12
Joe Clark	FW	13	0	1	0	1	0	15	0
Ben Davies	GK	19	0	6	0	1	0	26	0
Len Davies	FW	3	0	0	0	1	1	4	1
Herbie Evans	HB	5	0	0	0	0	0	5	0
Jack Evans	FW	29	1	6	0	0	0	35	1
Sidney Evans	FW	4	1	0	0	1	0	5	1
Ernie Gault	FW	2	0	0	0	0	0	2	0
Jimmy Gill	FW	37	19	6	1	0	0	43	20
Billy Grimshaw	FW	15	4	2	0	0	0	17	4
Billy Hardy	HB	42	1	7	0	0	0	49	1
Len Hopkins	HB	0	0	0	0	1	0	1	0
Charlie Jones	FW	1	0	0	0	1	0	2	0
Fred Keenor	DF	38	4	7	1	0	0	45	5
Herbert Kneeshaw	GK	23	0	1	0	0	0	24	0
Edward Layton	DF	2	0	0	0	0	0	2	0
Harry Nash	FW	14	2	0	0	0	0	14	2
Billy Newton	HB	5	0	0	0	1	0	6	0
Jack Page	DF	9	0	0	0	1	0	10	0
Fred Pagnam	FW	14	8	0	0	0	0	14	8
Tom Sayles	DF	0	0	0	0	1	0	1	0
Bert Smith	DF	40	0	7	0	0	0	47	0
George West	FW	21	4	1	0	0	0	22	4
Tommy Wilmott	DF	0	0	0	0	1	0	1	0

FW = Forward, HB = Halfback, GK = Goalkeeper, DF = Defender

== Aftermath ==
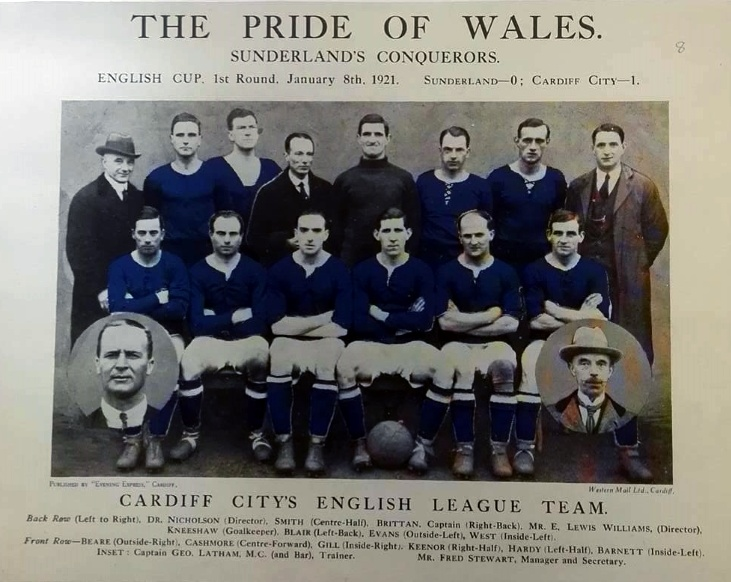
A postcard published by the Western Mail of the Cardiff team that reached the FA Cup semi-final

By winning promotion, Cardiff became the first Welsh side to reach the top tier of the Football League. They also became only the second side to win promotion to the First Division in their first season in the Football League, equalling the feat of Tottenham Hotspur in 1909. The majority of the squad remained to form the core of the first team in the following seasons. Some players were displaced by new signings and departed within the first half of the 1921–22 season, including Cashmore, Beare and West. Pagnam also departed the following season as he was unable to reproduce his good form in the higher tier, failing to score in 13 appearances.

A major increase in attendances following the move into the Football League and a long cup run significantly benefitted the club financially with the accounts being described as in "rude health" by the board. The club received praise for their performances through the campaign with the South Wales Echo writing "In all parts of the country Cardiff City is described as the team of the year and surely no other club has a better right to be so designated. Some of their performances have been really brilliant."
