= 1914–15 Cardiff City F.C. season =

Welsh football club season

Cardiff City
1914–15 season
- Chairman: JA McFarlane
- Manager: Fred Stewart
- Southern League Division One: 3rd
- FA Cup: 1st round
- Top goalscorer: League: George West (13); All: George West (13)
- Highest home attendance: 16,000 (v Swindon Town, 24 October 1914)
- Lowest home attendance: 1,900 (v Watford, 1 January 1915)
- Average home league attendance: 13,342
Home colours

The 1914–15 season was Cardiff City F.C.'s 18th season of competitive football and the team's fifth in the Southern Football League. They competed in the 20-team Southern Football League First Division, then the third tier of English football, finishing 3rd.

== Season review ==
=== Southern Football League Division One ===
==== Partial league table ====
| Pos | Team | Pld | W | D | L | GF | GA | GR | Pts | Qualification or relegation |
|---|---|---|---|---|---|---|---|---|---|---|
| 1 | Watford | 38 | 22 | 8 | 8 | 68 | 46 | 1.478 | 52 | |
| 2 | Reading | 38 | 21 | 7 | 10 | 68 | 43 | 1.581 | 49 | |
| 3 | Cardiff City | 38 | 22 | 4 | 12 | 72 | 38 | 1.895 | 48 | |
| 4 | West Ham United | 38 | 18 | 9 | 11 | 58 | 47 | 1.234 | 45 | Elected to the 1919–20 Football League Second Division after World War I |
| 5 | Northampton Town | 38 | 19 | 5 | 14 | 56 | 51 | 1.098 | 43 | |

Rules for classification: The system of using goal average to separate two teams tied on points was used up until the 1976–77 season. The points system: 2 points for a win, 1 point for a draw and 0 points for losing.

=== Results by round ===
| Round | 1 | 2 | 3 | 4 | 5 | 6 | 7 | 8 | 9 | 10 | 11 | 12 | 13 | 14 | 15 | 16 | 17 | 18 | 19 | 20 | 21 | 22 | 23 | 24 | 25 | 26 | 27 | 28 | 29 | 30 | 31 | 32 | 33 | 34 | 35 | 36 | 37 | 38 |
|---|---|---|---|---|---|---|---|---|---|---|---|---|---|---|---|---|---|---|---|---|---|---|---|---|---|---|---|---|---|---|---|---|---|---|---|---|---|---|
| Ground | A | H | A | H | A | A | H | A | H | A | H | A | H | A | H | A | H | A | H | H | A | H | A | H | H | A | H | A | H | A | H | A | A | H | H | A | H | A |
| Result | L | W | D | L | W | L | W | W | W | L | W | L | W | W | W | D | W | L | W | L | L | W | L | W | W | L | W | D | W | L | W | W | L | W | W | W | D | W |
| Points | 0 | 2 | 3 | 3 | 5 | 5 | 7 | 9 | 11 | 11 | 13 | 13 | 15 | 17 | 19 | 20 | 22 | 22 | 24 | 24 | 24 | 26 | 26 | 28 | 30 | 30 | 32 | 33 | 35 | 35 | 37 | 39 | 39 | 41 | 43 | 45 | 46 | 48 |
| Position | | | | | | | | | 8 | | | | | | | | | | 3 | | | | | | | | | 2 | | | | | | | | 2 | | 3 |

A = Away; H = Home; W = Win; D = Draw; L = Loss

== Players ==
First team squad.

| Pos. | Nation | Player |
|---|---|---|
| GK | ENG | John Stephenson |
| GK | ENG | Herbert Kneeshaw |
| DF | ENG | Albert Barnett |
| DF | ENG | Charlie Brittain |
| DF | ENG | Patrick Cassidy |
| DF | ENG | Henry Harvey |
| DF | WAL | Fred Keenor |
| DF | ENG | Edward Layton |
| MF | ENG | Billy Hardy |

| Pos. | Nation | Player |
|---|---|---|
| FW | ENG | George Beare |
| FW | ENG | Jack Burton |
| FW | ENG | Joe Clark |
| FW | ENG | Billy Devlin |
| FW | WAL | Jack Evans |
| FW | ENG | Arthur Goddard |
| FW | ENG | Billy Grimshaw |
| FW | ENG | Len Hopkins |
| FW | ENG | George West |

== Fixtures and results ==
=== Southern League Division One ===
| 2 September 1914 1 | Watford | 2–1 | Cardiff City | Watford |
| | Peter Ronald; Charlie White | | Patrick Cassidy | Stadium: Vicarage Road; Attendance: 8,000 |

| 5 September 1914 2 | Cardiff City | 1–0 | Norwich City | Cardiff |
| | Jack Evans | | | Stadium: Ninian Park; Attendance: 8,000 |

| 12 September 1914 3 | Gillingham | 1–1 | Cardiff City | Gillingham |
| | Goal | | Jack Burton | Stadium: Priestfield Stadium; Attendance: 6,000 |

| 19 September 1914 4 | Cardiff City | 0–1 | Brighton & Hove Albion | Cardiff |
| | | | Goal | Stadium: Ninian Park; Attendance: 10,000 |

| 26 September 1914 5 | Crystal Palace | 0–2 | Cardiff City | London |
| | | | Jack Evans; Len Hopkins | Stadium: Selhurst Park; Attendance: 9,000 |

| 3 October 1914 6 | Exeter City | 2–0 | Cardiff City | Exeter |
| | Goal | | | Stadium: St James Park; Attendance: 3,000 |

| 10 October 1914 7 | Cardiff City | 3–0 | Luton Town | Cardiff |
| | George West; Len Hopkins; Patrick Cassidy | | | Stadium: Ninian Park; Attendance: 8,000 |

| 17 October 1914 8 | Portsmouth | 0–1 | Cardiff City | Portsmouth |
| | | | George West | Stadium: Fratton Park; Attendance: 16,887 |

| 24 October 1914 9 | Cardiff City | 3–0 | Swindon Town | Cardiff |
| | George West; Jack Evans; Patrick Cassidy | | | Stadium: Ninian Park; Attendance: 16,000; Referee: CC Fallowfield |

| 31 October 1914 10 | Southend United | 2–1 | Cardiff City | Southend |
| | Goal | | George Beare | Stadium: Roots Hall; Attendance: 7,000 |

| 7 November 1914 11 | Cardiff City | 2–0 | Queens Park Rangers | Cardiff |
| | George Beare; Jack Evans | | | Stadium: Ninian Park; Attendance: 9,000 |

| 14 November 1914 12 | Millwall | 2–1 | Cardiff City | London |
| | Goal | | George Beare | Stadium: The Den; Attendance: 6,000 |

| 21 November 1914 13 | Cardiff City | 7–0 | Bristol Rovers | Cardiff |
| | Billy Devlin; Billy Devlin; Billy Devlin; Jack Evans; Arthur Goddard; George West; George Beare | | | Stadium: Ninian Park; Attendance: 10,000 |

| 28 November 1914 14 | Croydon Common | 0–1 | Cardiff City | Croydon |
| | | | Patrick Cassidy | Stadium: Croydon Common Athletic Ground; Attendance: 2,000 |

| 5 December 1914 15 | Cardiff City | 3–2 | Reading | Cardiff |
| | Billy Devlin; Billy Devlin; Sidney Crawford (o.g.) | | Goal | Stadium: Ninian Park; Attendance: 12,000 |

| 12 December 1914 16 | Southampton | 1–1 | Cardiff City | Southampton |
| | Goal | | George West | Stadium: The Dell; Attendance: 8,000 |

| 19 December 1914 17 | Cardiff City | 5–0 | Northampton Town | Cardiff |
| | Billy Devlin; Billy Devlin; Arthur Goddard; Arthur Goddard; George Beare | | | Stadium: Ninian Park; Attendance: 12,000 |

| 25 December 1914 18 | Plymouth Argyle | 2–0 | Cardiff City | Plymouth |
| | Bertie Bowler; Jimmy Kirkpatrick | | | Stadium: Home Park; Attendance: 8,000 |

| 26 December 1914 19 | Cardiff City | 2–0 | Plymouth Argyle | Cardiff |
| | Arthur Goddard; George Beare | | | Stadium: Ninian Park; Attendance: 9,000 |

| 1 January 1915 20 | Cardiff City | 2–3 | Watford | Cardiff |
| | Jack Evans; George Beare | | George Edmonds; Albert Green; Wally Tattersall | Stadium: Ninian Park; Attendance: 1,900 |

| 2 January 1915 21 | Norwich City | 2–1 | Cardiff City | Norwich |
| | Goal | | George Beare | Stadium: Carrow Road; Attendance: 4,000 |

| 16 January 1915 22 | Cardiff City | 3–1 | Gillingham | Cardiff |
| | George West; George West; Billy Devlin | | Goal | Stadium: Ninian Park; Attendance: 8,000 |

| 23 January 1915 23 | Brighton & Hove Albion | 2–1 | Cardiff City | Brighton |
| | Goal | | Jack Evans | Stadium: Goldstone Ground; Attendance: 6,000 |

| 30 January 1915 24 | Cardiff City | 5–0 | Crystal Palace | Cardiff |
| | George West; George West; Albert Barnett; George Beare; Jack Evans | | | Stadium: Ninian Park; Attendance: 10,000 |

| 6 February 1915 25 | Cardiff City | 1–0 | Exeter City | Cardiff |
| | Albert Barnett | | | Stadium: Ninian Park; Attendance: 5,000 |

| 13 February 1915 26 | Luton Town | 2–1 | Cardiff City | Luton |
| | Goal | | George West | Stadium: Kenilworth Road; Attendance: 9,000 |

| 20 February 1915 27 | Cardiff City | 3–2 | Portsmouth | Cardiff |
| | Albert Barnett; Fred Keenor; Jack Evans | | Goal | Stadium: Ninian Park; Attendance: 6,000 |

| 27 February 1915 28 | Swindon Town | 0–0 | Cardiff City | Swindon |
| | | | | Stadium: County Ground; Attendance: 5,000 |

| 6 March 1915 29 | Cardiff City | 3–0 | Southend United | Cardiff |
| | Arthur Goddard; Fred Keenor; Jack Evans | | | Stadium: Ninian Park; Attendance: 10,000 |

| 13 March 1915 30 | Queens Park Rangers | 3–0 | Cardiff City | London |
| | Goal | | | Stadium: Loftus Road; Attendance: 7,000 |

| 20 March 1915 31 | Cardiff City | 4–1 | Millwall | Cardiff |
| | Len Hopkins; Len Hopkins; Len Hopkins; Arthur Goddard | | Goal | Stadium: Ninian Park; Attendance: 11,000 |

| 27 March 1915 32 | Bristol Rovers | 0–1 | Cardiff City | London |
| | | | George Beare | Stadium: Eastville; Attendance: 11,000 |

| 2 April 1915 33 | West Ham United | 2–1 | Cardiff City | London |
| | Goal | | Arthur Goddard | Stadium: Upton Park; Attendance: 10,000 |

| 3 April 1915 34 | Cardiff City | 1–0 | Croydon Common | Cardiff |
| | George West | | | Stadium: Ninian Park; Attendance: 9,000 |

| 5 April 1915 35 | Cardiff City | 2–1 | West Ham United | Cardiff |
| | Albert Barnett; Arthur Goddard | | Goal | Stadium: Ninian Park; Attendance: 13,000 |

| 10 April 1915 36 | Reading | 1–2 | Cardiff City | Reading |
| | Goal | | Jack Evans; George West | Stadium: Elm Park; Attendance: 6,000 |

| 17 April 1915 37 | Cardiff City | 1–1 | Southampton | Cardiff |
| | Albert Barnett | | Goal | Stadium: Ninian Park; Attendance: 12,000 |

| 24 April 1915 38 | Northampton Town | 2–5 | Cardiff City | Northampton |
| | Goal | | Albert Barnett; Jack Evans; George West; George Beare; Patrick Cassidy | Stadium: County Ground; Attendance: 5,000 |

=== FA Cup ===
| 9 January 1915 Round 1 | Bristol City | 2–0 | Cardiff City | Bristol |
| | Edmund Burton 55', 83' | | | Stadium: Ashton Gate; Attendance: 14,319 |
