= Fred Sheldon =

Fred Sheldon may refer to:

- Fred Sheldon (English footballer) (1871–?), English footballer for Stoke
- Fred Sheldon (Welsh footballer), Welsh footballer for Aberdare Athletic
- Frederick H. Sheldon (born 1951), American ornithologist
