= Dai Williams =

Dai Williams may refer to:

- Dai Williams (rugby union) (1913–1975), South African international rugby union player
- Dai Williams (footballer), English association footballer active in the 1910s and 1920s
