= Sayle =

Sayle is a surname. Notable people with the surname include:

- Alexei Sayle (born 1952), English stand-up comedian, actor, author and former recording artist
- Amy Sayle (1884–1970), British politician and health visitor
- Charles Edward Sayle (1864–1924), English Uranian poet, literary scholar and librarian
- Desiree Sayle, Deputy Assistant to the President and Director of the USA Freedom Corps for the Bush Administration
- Jeff Sayle (motorcyclist) (born 1954), former Grand Prix motorcycle road racer from Australia
- Jeff Sayle (rugby union) (1942–2019), Australian rugby union international
- Murray Sayle OAM (1926–2010), Australian journalist, novelist and adventurer
- Robert Sayle, founder of a department store located in Cambridge
- William Sayle (1590–1671), prominent British landholder who was Governor of Bermuda in 1643 and again in 1658

== Fictional characters ==
- Darrius Sayle, major character in Snakehead

== See also ==
- James Sayle Moose (1903–1989), American diplomat and ambassador to several countries
- M. Sayle Taylor (1889–1942), operated a radio advice show on CBS, then NBC and finally on Mutual
- Saille
- Sayler
- Sayles
