= Sayles =

Sayles is an English surname. Notable people with the surname include:

- Alex Sayles (1903–1967), American ice hockey player and coach
- Bill Sayles (1917–1996), American baseball player
- Casey Sayles (born 1995), American gridiron football player
- Charlie Sayles (born 1948), American blues harmonica player
- Ed Sayles (born 1952), American musical theatre director
- Emanuel Sayles (1907–1986), American jazz banjoist
- Francis Sayles (1891–1944), American actor
- Frederick C. Sayles (1835–1903), American entrepreneur
- G. O. Sayles (1901–1994), English historian
- Irving Sayles (1872–1914), American vaudeville performer
- John Sayles (born 1950), American film director, screenwriter and novelist
- Johnny Sayles (1937–1993), American R&B and soul singer
- Marcus Sayles (born 1994), American gridiron football player
- Tom Sayles (1892–1940), English footballer
- Wayne G. Sayles (born 1943), American numismatist and author

== See also ==
- Sayle
