= George Burton (1910s footballer) =

English footballer

Personal information
- Place of birth: England
- Position: Forward

Senior career*
Years	Team	Apps	(Gls)
1909–1911	Middlesbrough	2	(0)
1911–1915	Cardiff City	44	(16)
- * Club domestic league appearances and goals

George Burton was an English professional footballer who played in the Football League for Middlesbrough and the Southern Football League for Cardiff City. His brother John was also a footballer and the pair played together at Cardiff City.

== Career ==
Burton signed for Southern Football League Second Division Cardiff City in 1911, joining his brother John at the club. He made his debut in a goalless draw with Portsmouth on 21 October before scoring his first goal for the club in a 4–2 victory over Cwm Albions a week later.

== Honours ==
Cardiff City

- Southern Football League Second Division winner: 1912–13
- Welsh Cup winner: 1912
