= Laurence Abrams =

English footballer

Personal information
- Full name: Laurence Robert Abrams
- Date of birth: 14 May 1889
- Place of birth: Banks, Lancashire, England
- Date of death: 20 March 1966 (aged 76)
- Place of death: Southport, England
- Height: 1.76 m (5 ft 9 1/2 in)
- Position: Left half

Senior career*
Years	Team	Apps	(Gls)
1905–1906	Southport Central	22	(6)
1906–1907	Colne Town		
1907–1910	Stockport County	67	(9)
1910–1914	Heart of Midlothian	107	(8)
1914–1920	Chelsea	44	(7)
1920	Cardiff City	1	(0)
1921–1923	Southport	46	(7)
- * Club domestic league appearances and goals

Laurence Robert Abrams (also spelt Lawrence and Abram) (14 May 1889 – 20 March 1966), often known as Lol Abrams, was an English professional footballer. During his career, he made over 250 appearances in the English Football League and Scottish Football League.

Born in Banks, Lancashire, near Southport, he began his career with Southport Central, becoming the club's youngest professional player after making his debut at sixteen. He moved to Colne Town in 1906 before joining Football League side Stockport County a year later.

In 1910, he moved to Scotland to sign for Hearts, helping the side win the East of Scotland Shield in his first season. His performances attracted attention from several clubs and, he eventually returned to England to join Chelsea where his career was interrupted by the First World War. He later made one appearance for Cardiff City before returning to Southport where he finished his professional career. He was described as playing in a "Scottish style" and was a strong tackler.

Although he never played an official match for England, he did represent the nation in one wartime international fixture.

== Club career ==
=== Early career ===
Born in Banks, Lancashire, Abrams attended Churchtown School, helping the school football team win the Unwin Challenge Shield, a schools tournament in Southport. He began his professional career with Southport Central as an outside forward. Breaking into the first team at the age of sixteen during the 1905–06 season, he made his senior debut on 11 November 1905 in a 7–0 defeat to Manchester United Reserves. He scored his first senior goal in his second appearance, during a 3–0 victory over Oldham Athletic.

Soon after, Oldham approached Southport over signing Abrams but were rebuffed as Southport claimed they had not been informed within the required time. In order to ward off interest, Southport offered Abrams a professional contract, making him the youngest ever professional player in the history of the club. Southport also attempted to claim £18 compensation from Oldham over the approach. Although the club's claim was unsuccessful, Oldham were later fined £5 by the Lancashire Combination. In his first season, he made 23 appearances in all competitions, scoring six times. He left the club in May 1906 to sign for rival Lancashire Combination side Colne Town.

In April 1907, Abrams joined Football League Second Division side Stockport County, making his debut in a 1–1 draw with Gainsborough on 7 September 1907. He remained with the club for three years, making over 70 appearances.

=== Hearts ===
On 30 December 1910, Abrams joined Scottish side Hearts for a fee of £650. He made his debut for the club the following day, during a 1–0 defeat to Third Lanark, and scored his first goal in his sixth appearance, during a 1–1 draw with Clyde in the Scottish Cup. On 11 April 1911, Abrams helped Hearts win the East of Scotland Shield after defeating Broxburn in the final. With the match held at 1–1 after 84 minutes, Abrams scored his second goal for the club to give his side a 2–1 lead. Two further late goals for Hearts saw the match finish 4–1. In September 1911, he won the Dunedin Cup with Hearts after defeating Ross County 1–0 in a second replay of the final, followed two 1–1 draws in the previous matches.

At Hearts, a reshuffle in the playing squad led Abrams to convert from an outside forward to a wing half. Described as "a player of the Scottish school", he formed an effective partnership on the left side with Bobby Walker. Abrams' performances for Hearts in his new position attracted considerable attention from English clubs, being scouted by Liverpool who sent John McKenna to see him play.

=== Football League ===
Keen to move to England, Abrams eventually transferred to Chelsea from Hearts in 1914 for £1000. Chelsea struggled to pay the transfer fee and Hearts later obtained a court order in August 1916 to enforce repayment of an outstanding sum of £750 but withdrew the action after Chelsea claimed the club would fold if the repayment was made. Hearts later dropped their claim against the club and the money was never paid.

He was a member of the Chelsea side that reached the FA Cup final in 1915 and he travelled to the final but did not play having suffered a twisted knee in the club's semi-final victory over Everton. During the First World War, he guested for three of his former clubs, Southport Central, Stockport County and Hearts, and also appeared for Liverpool for one match against Bolton Wanderers due to an injury crisis. He returned to Chelsea following the return of The Football League at the end of the hostilities, remaining at Stamford Bridge until 1920 having made a total of 49 appearances and scoring 7 goals in total. He joined newly elected Second Division side Cardiff City on a free transfer, reuniting with his former Stockport manager Fred Stewart. However, he made just one league appearance for the club on 30 August 1920 in a 0–0 draw with Clapton Orient, in the first league match played at Ninian Park.

He instead returned to his first club Southport, now members of the Football League Third Division, where he made over 50 appearances and was later appointed captain before finishing his professional career when his contract was cancelled in February 1923.

== International career ==
Although never capped at international level, Abrams did represent England in a Military International match held during the First World War, scoring one of his side's goals during a 4–3 victory over Scotland on 13 May 1916.

== Later life ==
Following his retirement from playing, he worked as a painter and decorator in Southport. Abrams and his wife were married in 1919 and had four children together before separating. She later sued him for desertion after he left when he discovered she had an affair.

== Career statistics ==
Appearances and goals by club, season and competition
Club	Season	League			Domestic Cup		Other		Total	
Club	Season	Division	Apps	Goals	Apps	Goals	Apps	Goals	Apps	Goals
Southport Central	1905–06	Lancashire Combination	22	6	1	0	0	0	23	6
Colne Town	1906–07	Lancashire Combination	?	?	?	?	?	?	?	?
Stockport County	1907–08	Second Division	23	3	0	0	0	0	23	3
Stockport County	1908–09	Second Division	28	6	2	0	0	0	30	6
Stockport County	1909–10	Second Division	16	0	2	0	0	0	18	0
Stockport County	Stockport County total		67	9	4	0	0	0	71	9
Hearts	1910–11	Scottish First Division	13	0	1	1	4 (Note: Appearances in East of Scotland Shield and Rosebery Charity Cup)	1	18	2
Hearts	1911–12	Scottish First Division	31	6	6	1	9 (Note: Appearances in Dunedin Cup, North-Eastern Cup and Wilson Cup)	5	46	12
Hearts	1912–13	Scottish First Division	25	1	1	0	11 (Note: Appearances in Dunedin Cup, North-Eastern Cup, Wilson Cup, East of Scotland Shield and Rosebery Charity Cup)	0	34	1
Hearts	1913–14	Scottish First Division	38	1	1	0	8 (Note: Appearances in Dunedin Cup, North-Eastern Cup, Wilson Cup and East of Scotland Shield)	1	47	2
Hearts	Hearts total		107	8	10	2	32	7	149	17
Chelsea	1913–14	First Division	31	5	5	0	0	0	36	5
Chelsea	1919–20	First Division	13	2	0	0	0	0	13	2
Chelsea	Chelsea total		44	7	5	0	0	0	49	7
Cardiff City	1920–21	Second Division	1	0	0	0	0	0	1	0
Southport	1921–22	Third Division North	36	7	4	0	0	0	40	7
Southport	1922–23	Third Division North	10	0	0	0	0	0	10	0
Southport	Southport total		46	7	4	0	0	0	50	7
Total			288	37	24	2	32	7	347	46

== Honours ==
Hearts

- East of Scotland Shield winner: 1911
- Dunedin Cup winner: 1911

Chelsea

- FA Cup Runner-up: 1915
