= Ernie Gault =

English footballer

Personal information
- Full name: William Ernest Gault
- Date of birth: 20 September 1889
- Place of birth: Wallsend, England
- Date of death: 1980 (aged 90–91)
- Height: 5 ft 9 in (1.75 m)
- Position: Forward

Senior career*
Years	Team	Apps	(Gls)
1909–1913	Everton		
1913–1917	Stockport County	94	(39)
1917–1920	Everton	21	(12)
1920	Cardiff City	2	(0)
1920–1922	Stockport County	41	(12)
- * Club domestic league appearances and goals

William Ernest Gault (20 September 1889 — 1980) was an English professional footballer who played as a forward.

== Career ==
Gault began his career with local amateur sides Wallsend Elm Villa and Jarrow Caledonians before joining Everton in 1909. He was sold to Stockport County in 1913 where he went on to make over 90 appearances before the outbreak of World War I. After appearing for his former side Everton as a guest player, he rejoined the club on a permanent basis in 1917. He was a prolific goalscorer during wartime league competitions, scoring over 75 goals in two seasons.

He remained with Everton for the 1919–20 season, following the return of the Football League before joining Cardiff City in 1920. He played in the club's first home Football League fixture, a 0–0 draw with Clapton Orient on 30 August 1920, but made only one further appearance for the club as he was unable to displace George West from the side. He returned to Stockport where he finished his professional career.
