= Jack Rutherford (footballer, born 1892) =

English footballer

John Rutherford (1892–1930) was an English professional footballer. He played for Brighton & Hove Albion, Bristol Rovers and Gillingham between 1920 and 1927.
