= Edmund Burton (footballer) =

English footballer

Personal information
- Full name: Edmund Burton
- Date of birth: 1893
- Place of birth: Dunston, England
- Date of death: 13 August 1916 (aged 23)
- Place of death: Somme, France
- Height: 5 ft 9 1/2 in (1.77 m)
- Position: Forward

Senior career*
Years	Team	Apps	(Gls)
–1913	Shildon Athletic		
1913–1915	Bristol City	18	(4)
- * Club domestic league appearances and goals

Edmund Burton (1893 – 13 August 1916) was an English professional footballer who played as a forward in the Football League for Bristol City.

== Personal life ==
Burton served as a private in the Durham Light Infantry during the First World War. He was killed in action during the Battle of the Somme on 13 August 1916 and was buried in Englebelmer Communal Cemetery.

== Career statistics ==
Appearances and goals by club, season and competition
Club	Season	League			FA Cup		Total	
Club	Season	Division	Apps	Goals	Apps	Goals	Apps	Goals
Bristol City	1914–15	Second Division	13	3	1	2	14	5
Career total			13	3	1	2	14	5
