= Billy Newton =

English footballer

Personal information
- Full name: William Newton
- Date of birth: 14 May 1893
- Place of birth: Cramlington, England
- Date of death: 29 April 1973 (aged 79)
- Height: 5 ft 9 in (1.75 m)
- Position: Wing half

Senior career*
Years	Team	Apps	(Gls)
1913–1914	Blyth Spartans		
1914–1919	Hartford Colliery		
1919–1920	Newcastle United	0	(0)
1920–1922	Cardiff City	6	(0)
1923–1926	Leicester City	87	(1)
1926–1927	Grimsby Town	14	(0)
1927–1931	Stockport County	151	(2)
1931–1932	Hull City	24	(0)
1932–1933	Stockport County	0	(0)

Managerial career
- 1952: Stockport County (caretaker)
- 1960: Stockport County (caretaker)
- * Club domestic league appearances and goals

William Newton (14 May 1893 – 29 April 1973) was an English professional footballer who played as a wing half.
