= Bertie Bowler =

English footballer (1891–??)

Personal information
- Full name: Albert Bowler
- Date of birth: 1891
- Place of birth: Southwell, England
- Positions: Inside left; centre forward

Senior career*
Years	Team	Apps	(Gls)
- Sherwood Foresters
1911–1923	Plymouth Argyle	171	(61)

International career
	Southern League XI	5	
- * Club domestic league appearances and goals

Albert Bowler (born 1891) was an English professional footballer who played as an inside forward.

== Career ==
Bowler was born in Nottingham. He began his career while serving as a private in the British Army, playing for Army Cup winners Sherwood Foresters. He obtained his discharge from the Army in 1911, allowing him to join Southern League club Plymouth Argyle. He made his first team debut in a 1–0 win at New Brompton on 23 December 1911 and scored his first goal against Millwall in a 2–0 win on 6 January 1912. The following season, Bowler scored 18 league goals in 36 appearances as the club became Southern League champions. He played in five matches for the Southern League representative side and was selected for England in an unofficial international against Scotland in Cairo during the First World War. He returned to Plymouth after the war, and was a member of the squad when the club was elected to the Football League in 1920. Bowler continued playing for another three years before retiring from the game in 1923.

== Personal life ==
Bowler enlisted in the British Army in January 1908, but was discharged by purchase three years later. During the First World War, he returned to the army, serving in the Sherwood Foresters as a private.

== Honours ==
Plymouth Argyle

- Southern Football League: 1912–13
