= Jimmy Kirkpatrick =

Scottish footballer

Personal information
- Full name: James Nodwell Kirkpatrick
- Date of birth: Not known
- Place of birth: Dumfries, Scotland
- Date of death: Not known
- Position: Outside right

Senior career*
Years	Team	Apps	(Gls)
–	Dumfries		
1911–1924	Plymouth Argyle	176	(8)
1924–19XX	Torquay United		
- * Club domestic league appearances and goals

James Nodwell Kirkpatrick was a Scottish professional footballer who played 40 games in the English Football League for Plymouth Argyle in the 1920s. An outside right, he also played for Dumfries and Torquay United.

== Career ==
Kirkpatrick was born in Dumfries, and played for hometown club, Dumfries F.C., one of the three clubs that merged in 1919 to form Queen of the South. He moved to England in 1911 to play for Plymouth Argyle, then a Southern League club. He made 187 appearances for the club in all competitions either side of the First World War. Kirkpatrick played in Argyle's first game in the Football League, as the Southern League Division One clubs were absorbed to form the Football League Third Division for the 1920–21 season. The last of his 40 appearances in that competition came in 1924, and he then joined Torquay United, still a Southern League club.
