= Ben Beynon =

Wales international rugby union & league footballer

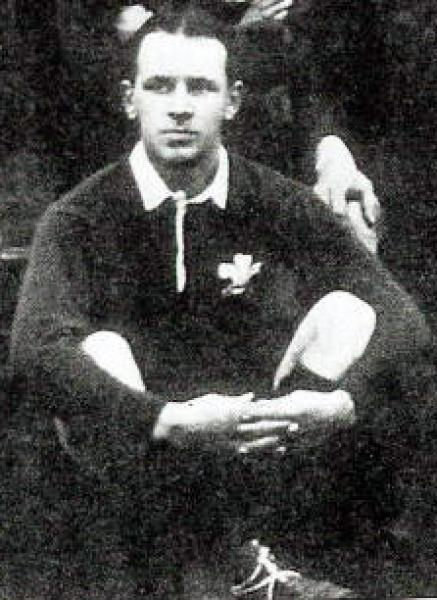

Personal information
- Full name: Benjamin Beynon
- Born: 14 March 1894; Swansea, Wales
- Died: 21 May 1969 (aged 75); Swansea, Wales

Playing information

Rugby union
- Position: Fly-half
Club
Years	Team	Pld	T	G	FG	P
	Manselton RFC
1913–19	Swansea RFC
	Total	0	0	0	0	0
Representative
Years	Team	Pld	T	G	FG	P
1920	Wales	2	0	0	0	0

Rugby league
- Position: Back
Club
Years	Team	Pld	T	G	FG	P
1922–26	Oldham	94	25	1	0	77
Association football career
Senior career*
Years	Team	Apps	(Gls)
1914–22	Swansea Town		
- *Club domestic league appearances and goals

Benjamin Beynon (14 March 1894 – 21 May 1969) was a Welsh international rugby union fly-half who played club rugby for Swansea, and would later play professional rugby league for Oldham RLFC. Beynon was also an association footballer for Swansea Town.

== Rugby career ==
Beynon played rugby union for his home team club, Swansea, playing his first game in 1913. He was first selected to represent Wales on 17 January 1920, when he faced England at St. Helens. Wales ran out comprehensive winners, mainly thanks to Newport's Jerry Shea scoring 16 points on his own. His second and last match was against Scotland three weeks later. It was unknown if Beynon would have won more caps, as he became a professional footballer for Swansea Town in the same year, which prevented him from playing rugby union. The Welsh Rugby Union even withheld his actual cap to commemorate his appearance as they believed he was professional before he represented Wales at union. Beynon was the first Swansea player to turn out for a rugby union, league (Oldham) and association football teams.

=== International rugby matches played ===
Wales

- England 1920
- Scotland 1920

== Association football career ==
Beynon played association football for Waunwen and then Swansea Town, playing his first game for the 'Swans' on 28 November 1914. Just two months later Beynon played the most notable game for Swansea when he was selected to face First Division side Blackburn Rovers in an FA Cup draw. Swansea won a shock 1–0 victory, Beynon scoring the goal, his only score in four FA Cup appearances. His final game for Swansea was on 17 April 1922, and during his career he managed to score a hat-trick, in a match at the Vetch Field in September 1920 against Norwich.

== Bibliography ==
- Jenkins, John M.; et al. (1991). Who's Who of Welsh International Rugby Players. Wrexham: Bridge Books. ISBN 1-872424-10-4.
- Smith, David; Williams, Gareth (1980). Fields of Praise: The Official History of The Welsh Rugby Union. Cardiff: University of Wales Press. ISBN 0-7083-0766-3.
