= Colne Town F.C. =

English association football club

Colne Town
- Full name: Colne Town Football Club
- Founded: 1920
- Dissolved: 1937
- League: West Lancashire League
- 1936–37: West Lancashire League 19th

Colne Town Football Club was an English association football club based in the town of Colne, Lancashire. It played in the Lancashire Combination between 1925 and 1927 and competed in the 1926–27 Extra Preliminary Round of the FA Cup.

== History ==
The club was founded in 1920, originally as Colne Carlton. In 1925 it changed its name to Colne Town.

The club originally played in the North-east Lancashire Combination, winning the competition shield in 1921–22 and 1924–25. It was forced into applying to join the Lancashire Combination for the 1925–26 season, after the North-east folded for lack of members, and was successful in its application; it finished 16th out of 20 teams in its inaugural season. The following campaign, Colne Town finished 19th in the league, the drop due mostly to releasing all its professionals halfway through the season for financial reasons. It left the Lancashire Combination for one season in the West Lancashire League and in 1928 joined the Craven and District League, winning the title in 1929–30.

In 1926, it entered the FA Cup, the major cup competition in England, for the only time. However, they were knocked out in the Extra Preliminary Round after losing 1–4 at home to Clitheroe.

By 1934 the club was in serious financial difficulties, losing £40 over the 1933–34 season and holding a debt of over £120, and only the support of comedian Dick Hoskin enabled the club to continue - even then it was forced to run one XI only, withdrawing its reserves from the Nelson Amateur League. In 1936, the club committee gambled on re-joining the West Lancashire League, in the hope of generating greater income, but the move turned out to be disastrous; the financial losses over the season ran to over £200, and as a result the club disbanded.

In June 2010, an unrelated amateur team with the same name was formed in Colne.

== Ground ==
For the two seasons in which it played in the Combination, the club's ground was known as Old Earth, which lay between Oak Street and what later became Park School.

== Club records ==
- Lancashire Combination
  - Highest placing: 16th – 1925–26
- FA Cup
  - Extra Preliminary Round 1926–27

== FA Cup result ==
Season	Date	Round	Opponents	H/A	Result
1926–27	4 September 1926	Extra Preliminary Round	Clitheroe	Home	1–4
