= Albert Green (footballer, born 1892) =

English footballer (1892–1956)

Personal information
- Full name: Albert Green
- Date of birth: 7 October 1892
- Place of birth: Rickmansworth, England
- Date of death: 23 April 1956 (aged 63)
- Place of death: Watford, England
- Position: Inside forward

Senior career*
Years	Team	Apps	(Gls)
1908–1912	Rickmansworth		
1912	Watford Orient		
1912–1919	Watford	48	(13)
1919–1920	Crystal Palace	9	(2)
1920–1921	Sheppey United		
1921–1922	Charlton Athletic	17	(3)
1922–1923	Millwall	0	(0)
1923–1924	Reading	10	(1)
- * Club domestic league appearances and goals

Albert Green (7 October 1892 – 23 April 1956) was an English professional footballer who played in the Football League for Charlton Athletic and Reading as an inside forward. He had a long association with Southern League club Watford and also played for Crystal Palace of the same division.

== Personal life ==
Green served as a private in the Hertfordshire Yeomanry during the First World War. He was discharged from the Army due to sickness or wounds received during the course of his service, for which he was awarded the Silver War Badge.

== Career statistics ==
Appearances and goals by club, season and competition
Club	Season	League			FA Cup		Other		Total	
Club	Season	Division	Apps	Goals	Apps	Goals	Apps	Goals	Apps	Goals
Watford	1912–13	Southern League Premier Division	7	1	0	0	1 (Note: Appearance in Southern Charity Cup)	0	8	1
Watford	1913–14	Southern League Premier Division	18	4	2	0	1	0	21	4
Watford	1914–15	Southern League Premier Division	23	8	0	0	0	0	23	8
Watford	Total		48	13	2	0	2	0	52	13
Charlton Athletic	1921–22	Third Division South	17	3	0	0	―		17	3
Career total			65	16	2	0	2	0	69	16

== Honours ==
Watford

- Southern League Premier Division: 1914–15
