= Sayler =

Sayler is a surname. Notable people with the surname include:

- Henry B. Sayler (1836–1900), American politician, cousin of Milton
- Jace Sayler (born 1979), American football player
- Milton Sayler (1831–1892), American politician

== See also ==
- Battle of Sayler's Creek, fought April 6, 1865, southwest of Petersburg, Virginia
- Sayler Park, Cincinnati, neighborhood in Cincinnati, Ohio
- Sayler's Creek Battlefield near Farmville, Virginia
