= Arthur Cashmore =

English footballer

Personal information
- Date of birth: 30 October 1891
- Place of birth: Aston, Birmingham, England
- Date of death: 7 April 1943 (aged 51)
- Place of death: Birmingham, England
- Height: 5 ft 9 in (1.75 m)
- Position: Forward

Senior career*
Years	Team	Apps	(Gls)
1913–1914	Manchester United	3	(0)
1914–?	Oldham Athletic		
1919–1921	Cardiff City	52	(24)
1921–?	Notts County		
- * Club domestic league appearances and goals

Arthur A. Cashmore (30 October 1891 – 7 April 1943) was an English professional footballer. His regular position was as a forward.

== Career ==
Born in Birmingham, Cashmore had previously played for local sides Sparkhill Avondale, Bromsgrove Rovers and Stourbridge when he joined Manchester United in June 1913. He made his debut for the club on 13 September 1913 in a 1–0 defeat to Bolton Wanderers but went on to make just two more appearances for the club before being sold to Oldham Athletic at the end of the 1913–14 season for £100. In his first season at Boundary Park he scored eight goals in 16 games as he helped Oldham to a second-place finish in Division One.

However, Cashmore was later hampered by injuries and left the club, playing for non-league side Darlaston. Following the resumption of league football at the end of the First World War, Cashmore joined Southern Football League side Cardiff City, finishing his first season as the club's top scorer with 14 goals. He remained with the club on their entry into The Football League the following year, forming a partnership with Jimmy Gill and playing in their first Football League match, a 5–2 win over Stockport County, as well as later becoming the first player to score a Football League goal at Ninian Park in the return fixture between the two teams on 4 September 1920. He left Cardiff in 1921 to join Notts County where he finished his league career.
