= William Devlin (footballer, born 1891) =

English footballer

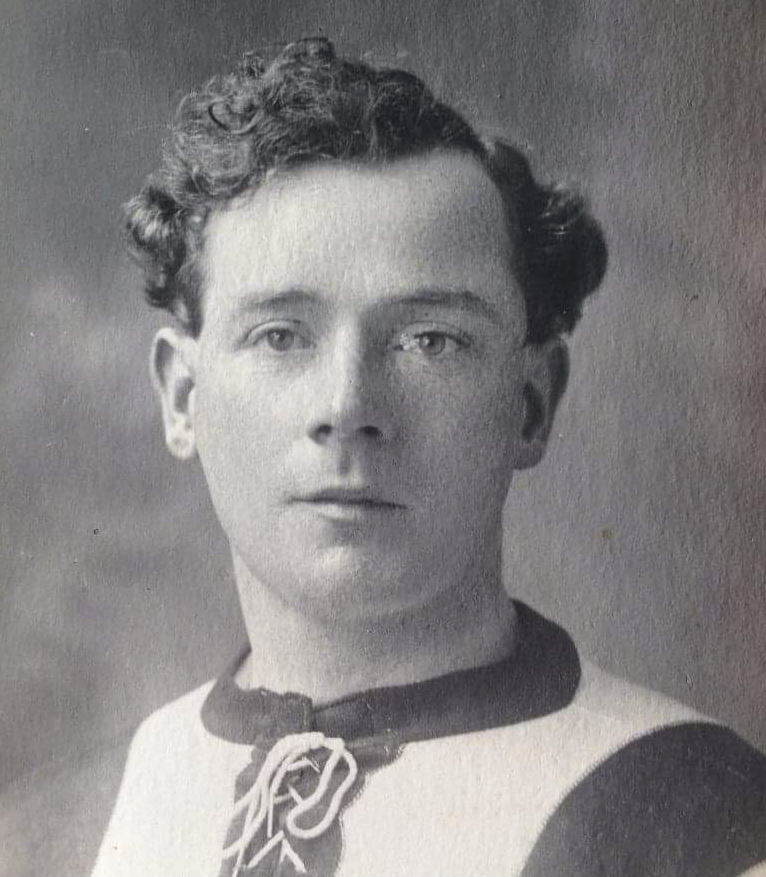
- Devlin in his Exeter City shirt

Personal information
- Date of birth: 23 January 1891
- Place of birth: Hebburn, England
- Position: Forward

Youth career
- Wallsend

Senior career*
Years	Team	Apps	(Gls)
1911–1912	Stockport County	20	(2)
1912–1919	Cardiff City	52	(24)
1919–1922	Newport County	56	(19)
1922–1923	Exeter City		
- * Club domestic league appearances and goals

William Devlin (born 23 January 1891) was an English professional footballer.

After beginning his professional career with Stockport County, Devlin joined Cardiff City in 1912, reuniting with his former Stockport manager Fred Stewart. He helped the club win the Southern Football League Second Division title in his first season and remained with the Bluebirds until 1919. returning to the club after the Football League resumed matches following the end of World War I. In November 1919, he joined Newport County and later spent one season with Exeter City.

== Honours ==
Cardiff City

- Southern Football League Second Division winner: 1912–13
