= Bert Smith (footballer, born 1896) =

Irish footballer

Personal information
- Full name: Ernest Edwin Smith
- Date of birth: 4 January 1896
- Place of birth: Donegal, Ireland
- Height: 5 ft 11 in (1.80 m)

Senior career*
Years	Team	Apps	(Gls)
1919–1923	Cardiff City	105	(2)
1923–1925	Middlesbrough	21	(0)
1925–1927	Watford	50	(1)

International career
1921–1923	Ireland	4	(0)
- * Club domestic league appearances and goals

Ernest Edwin "Bert" Smith (born 4 January 1896, date of death unknown) was a professional footballer who played for Cardiff and then Middlesbrough and Watford. He was born in Donegal. He was capped four times by Ireland, captaining the team against England in 1922. Smith was born of English parents and his father worked as a lighthouse keeper in Donegal.

Smith's football career began during World War I when he played for the Indian army. On his return to Britain he joined Cardiff City for the start of the 1919–1920 season as they played in the Southern Football League. He played more times than any other player in that season and remained with the club as they were elected into the Football League the following year. Cardiff were promoted into division one after just one season in division two along with Birmingham City. Smith scored the club's first ever goal in the first division when he found the net in a 2–1 defeat to Aston Villa, also scoring a goal for Cardiff in the FA Cup semi final in 1921 during a 2–1 defeat to eventual winners Wolverhampton Wanderers.

He was allowed to leave the club in 1923 to join Middlesbrough, but his opportunities at the side were limited so he moved on again in 1925, this time to join Watford. He made 50 league appearances for the club before finishing his career at non-league Emsworth F.C.. He was also capped 4 times for Ireland. After retiring from football he owned and ran a guest house in the Isle of Wight.
