= Fred Sheldon (Welsh footballer) =

Welsh footballer

Personal information
- Full name: Fredrick Sheldon
- Place of birth: Barry, Vale of Glamorgan, Wales
- Position: Midfielder

Senior career*
Years	Team	Apps	(Gls)
- Barry Town
1921–1926	Aberdare Athletic	178	(11)
- Swansea Town
–	Barry Town		
- * Club domestic league appearances and goals

Fredrick Sheldon (born in Barry, Vale of Glamorgan, Wales) was a footballer who played in The Football League for Aberdare Athletic. He initially played for Barry Town and was transferred to Swansea Town in 1919. In the South Wales derby between Swansea Town and Cardiff City in 1919, Sheldon famously scored both goals as Swansea recovered from a 1–0 deficit to win 2–1.
