= Tom Sayles =

English footballer (1892–1940)

Personal information
- Full name: Thomas Sayles
- Date of birth: 1892
- Place of birth: Wales, Yorkshire, England
- Date of death: 1940 (aged 47–48)
- Position: Full back

Senior career*
Years	Team	Apps	(Gls)
1913	Kiveton Park		
1919	Sheffield		
1920–1921	Cardiff City	0	(0)
1921–1923	Barnsley	20	(0)
1923–1927	Southend United	94	(2)
- * Club domestic league appearances and goals

Tom Sayles (1892–1940) was an English professional footballer who played over 100 Football League games for Barnsley and Southend United.
