= Dai Williams (footballer) =

English footballer

Personal information
- Place of birth: Liverpool, England
- Height: 5 ft 8 in (1.73 m)
- Position: Forward

Senior career*
Years	Team	Apps	(Gls)
- St Helens Recreation
19??–1912	Stafford Rangers		
1912	Glossop	6	(2)
1912–1914	Notts County	31	(5)
1914–1915	Belfast Celtic		
1919–1920	Luton Town	23	(5)
1920–1921	Brighton & Hove Albion	30	(5)
1921–19??	Maidstone United		
- * Club domestic league appearances and goals

David H. Williams, known as Dai or Dave Williams, was an English professional footballer who played as a forward in the Football League for Glossop, Notts County and Brighton & Hove Albion.

== Life and career ==
Williams was born in Liverpool. He played football for Lancashire Combination club St Helens Recreation and Stafford Rangers of the Birmingham & District League before joining Glossop ahead of the 1912–13 Football League season. He made seven Second Division appearances, scoring twice, in the first two months of the season and then moved up a division to join Notts County for a "substantial" fee which was later reported as £700. Williams' contribution was not enough to save Notts County from relegation from the First Division, but he was prepared to sign on for a further season when some of his teammates were still arguing for higher wages if they were to remain with a second-tier club. By the end of the 1913–14 season, he had scored 5 goals from 31 league appearances and Notts were back in the First Division.

In May 1914, Williams signed for Belfast Celtic of the Irish League. He scored prolifically for the team, including a league record five goals in a match against Cliftonville, and was selected for the Probables in an Irish League representative team trial played as a charity match in aid of the Prince of Wales' National Relief Fund. With gate receipts reduced because of the war, the League decided to impose a 25% wage cut on its players. Williams successfully appealed to the Irish Football Association on the grounds that "the reduction was excessive, and held that no third party could break a contract between club and player." While accepting the need for a reduction – the player was prepared to accept 12.5% – the Association felt it had "no option but to uphold the contract". Belfast Celtic won the 1914–15 Irish League title, and Williams was a member of the team that reached the final of the Irish Cup.

During the First World War, Williams worked in the munitions factories in Liverpool before joining the Royal Field Artillery. While serving as a corporal, he captained his unit's football team. When his other duties allowed, he played wartime football for Liverpool (the Liverpool Echo suggested that the local clubs' failure to sign him before the war had been a mistake), broke his arm while representing Preston North End in late 1915, and scored 4 goals from 16 appearances for Arsenal in the 1916–17 London Combination.

After his demobilisation, Williams joined Luton Town. Although Notts County had retained his Football League registration, the Southern League no longer recognised the retain and transfer system, so Luton were able to sign him without paying a fee. He was appointed captain, and the Luton Reporter described him as "one of the most earnest of players", but his 23 matches produced only 5 goals, and he was allowed to leave for another Southern League club, Brighton & Hove Albion, in March 1920 for a £200 fee. He played at wing half as well as in all forward positions for Brighton, making 10 appearances in what remained of the 1919–20 season, and a further 21 in the next, of which all but one were in the newly formed Football League Third Division. The signing of Andy Neil in late 1920 reduced Williams' first-team opportunities considerably, and he was given a free transfer at the end of the season. His last known club was Maidstone United of the Kent League.
