= John Burton (footballer, born 1885) =

English footballer

Personal information
- Full name: John Henry Burton
- Date of birth: 31 July 1885
- Place of birth: South Bank, England
- Date of death: 22 April 1938 (aged 52)
- Place of death: Walthamstow, England
- Position: Forward

Senior career*
Years	Team	Apps	(Gls)
- Grangetown
1906–1908	Blackburn Rovers	3	(0)
1908–1909	West Ham United	15	(3)
1909–1910	Birmingham	4	(3)
1910–1911	Nelson		
1911–1914	Cardiff City	68	(25)
1914–1915	Southend United		
- * Club domestic league appearances and goals

John Henry Burton (31 July 1885 – 22 April 1938 (Note: The date and place of death given in Matthews' Birmingham City: A Complete Record and elsewhere, of 13 May 1949 in Derby, cannot be that of the footballer John Henry Burton. The John H. Burton who died in Derby in 1949 was aged 73; the footballer would have been 63.)) was an English professional footballer who played in the Football League for Blackburn Rovers and Birmingham.

After a spell with Nelson, he joined Southern Football League side Cardiff City in 1911, captaining the side to the Second Division title in 1913. He was also the first Cardiff player to score in a South Wales derby. He later played for Southend United.

== Career ==
Burton was born in South Bank, which was then in the North Riding of Yorkshire. A forward, he signed for Blackburn Rovers, and made his debut in the Football League with the club. He joined West Ham United for the 1908–09 season, in which he scored 3 goals in 19 games in all competitions, of which 15 were in the Southern League. He then moved back to the Football League with Birmingham, but despite a return of three goals in the four Second Division games he played, he was unable to establish himself as a first-team player. In October 1910, Burton dropped back into non-league football with Nelson.

Burton joined Cardiff City in 1911, alongside his brother George, top scoring for the club as captain in the 1912–13 season as they finished in first place in the Second Division of the Southern Football League. He also became the first Cardiff player to score in a South Wales derby against local rivals Swansea Town when he equalised for his side during a 1–1 draw in the first meeting between the two sides in September 1912. In February 1913, he scored a bicycle kick in the second South Wales derby during a Welsh Cup semi-final that saw several of his opponents stop to shake hands with him in appreciation of the goal. He later played for Southend United. During the First World War he made guest appearances for West Ham United.

Burton died of septicaemia in Whipps Cross Hospital, Walthamstow in 1938 at the age of 52.

== Honours ==
Cardiff City

- Southern Football League Second Division winner: 1912–13
- Welsh Cup winner: 1912
