= George Beare (footballer) =

English footballer (1885-1970)

Personal information
- Full name: George Beare
- Date of birth: 2 October 1885
- Place of birth: Shirley, Southampton, England
- Date of death: 31 January 1970 (aged 84)
- Place of death: Cardiff, Wales
- Height: 5 ft 7 in (1.70 m)
- Position: Inside forward

Youth career
- Shirley Warren

Senior career*
Years	Team	Apps	(Gls)
1906–1908	Southampton	1	(0)
1908–1910	Blackpool	76	(18)
1910–1914	Everton	104	(18)
1914–1921	Cardiff City	98	(18)
1921–1922	Bristol City	14	(2)
1922–1923	Cardiff City	0	(0)
?-?	Oswestry Town	?	(?)
- * Club domestic league appearances and goals

George Beare (2 October 1885 – 31 January 1970) was an English professional footballer who played for Blackpool, Everton and Cardiff City in the early years of the twentieth century.

== Football career ==
Beare was born in Shirley Warren, Southampton, and played for his local team before being spotted by Southern League club Southampton in 1906. He spent most of his time at the Saints playing in the reserves, and was described as "a quick touch-line dribbler". He made his Southern League debut in the final game of the 1906–07 season, replacing George Harris in a 2–1 victory over Bristol Rovers. For the following season, Southampton signed Welsh international John Lewis and Beare spent another season in the reserves before moving to Blackpool in 1908.

He spent two full seasons at Blackpool, who were then in the Second Division, before moving on to First Division Everton in autumn 1910.

He made his debut for Everton replacing England international Bert Freeman in a 3–1 defeat at Bradford City on 12 November 1910. Despite joining Everton part way through the season, his eight goals (from 26 appearances) made him the club's joint-top-scorer in the league (with Bill Lacey and Alex Young) for the 1910–11 season, as Everton finished fourth in the table.

The following season, 1911–12, he was part of the Everton team that reached the runners-up position in the table, finishing three points behind champions Blackburn Rovers, despite a team total of only 46 goals (three from Beare), the fifth-worst total in the league. In 1912–13, it soon became clear that Everton were struggling to build on the runners up position from he previous season, and they finished eleventh in the league. The lack of goals remained a problem, and despite Tommy Browell and Frank Bradshaw both getting double figures, the team as whole could only manage 48 in total, with Beare contributing seven.

Whilst the 1912–13 season had been disappointing, 1913–14 was even worse for both Everton and Beare, as the club finished fifteenth in the table, winning only twelve games and avoiding relegation by just five points, with Beare failing to score. At the end of the season, Beare returned to the Southern League to join Cardiff City.

Cardiff ended the 1914–15 season third in the Southern League table, before league football was suspended during the First World War. On the cessation of hostilities, Cardiff spent one final season in the Southern League, finishing fourth, before being invited to join the Football League Second Division as the strongest team in Wales, with the remaining Southern League clubs forming the new Football League Third Division. In their inaugural season in the Football League, Cardiff finished runners-up in the Second Division table equal on points with champions Birmingham but with a far inferior goal average, but this was sufficient to gain promotion to the top flight. They also had a great run in the FA Cup reaching the semi-final stage, where they went out to Wolverhampton Wanderers after a replay. Beare played in all seven FA Cup matches, and scored the solitary goal in the first round victory over Sunderland.

Beare returned to Second Division football with Bristol City in November 1921, but after Bristol City were relegated at the end of the 1921–22 season, he returned to Cardiff City in September 1922. He made no further appearances for Cardiff before playing out his career with Oswestry Town in the Shropshire League.

Late in his career it was written about him: "If he did not enjoy playing football, he would probably have been one of our leading music hall comedians as he is an expert card manipulator, a trick cyclist of no little repute and an excellent billiards player."

== Honours ==
Everton

- Football League runners-up: 1911–12

Cardiff City

- Football League Second Division runners-up: 1920–21
