= Patrick Cassidy (footballer) =

English footballer

Personal information
- Date of birth: 1887
- Place of birth: Wallsend, England
- Position: Centre half

Senior career*
Years	Team	Apps	(Gls)
- North Shields Athletic
- Sheffield United
- South Shields
1911–1912	Bradford City	4	(0)
1912–1920	Cardiff City	89	(11)
- Willington St Aidan's
Total		93+	(11+)
- * Club domestic league appearances and goals

Patrick Cassidy (born 1887) was an English professional footballer who played as a centre half.

== Career ==
Born in Wallsend, Cassidy played for North Shields Athletic, Sheffield United, South Shields, Bradford City, Cardiff City, and Willington St Aidan's.

For Bradford City, he made 4 appearances in the Football League. In 1912, Cassidy joined Southern Football League Second Division side Cardiff City, making his debut in a 1–0 victory over Mid Rhondda on 12 September. He helped the side to win the title and promotion to the First Division in his debut season. His defensive partnership with Billy Hardy and Kidder Harvey led the trio to be given the nickname of the "holy three" by the club fans. The emergence of a young Fred Keenor following the end of World War I saw Cassidy come under pressure for his place in the side and, following Keenor's strong performances during pre-season matches prior to 1919–20 season, Cassidy himself pushed for Keenor to be included in the first-team in his place due to his "youth and promise".

== Honours ==
Cardiff City

- Southern Football League Second Division winner: 1912–13

== Sources ==
- Frost, Terry (1988). Bradford City A Complete Record 1903-1988. Breedon Books Sport. ISBN 0-907969-38-0.
