= Jack Evans (footballer, born 1889) =

Welsh footballer

Personal information
- Full name: John Hugh Evans
- Date of birth: 31 January 1889
- Place of birth: Bala, Wales
- Date of death: 24 September 1971 (aged 82)
- Place of death: Cardiff, Wales
- Height: 5 ft 11 in (1.80 m)
- Position: Outside left

Senior career*
Years	Team	Apps	(Gls)
- Bala Wanderers
- Welshpool
1908–1909	Wrexham		
1909–1910	Cwmparc		
1910–1926	Cardiff City	354	(58)
1926–1928	Bristol Rovers		

International career
1912–1923	Wales	8	(1)
- * Club domestic league appearances and goals

John Hugh Evans (31 January 1889 – 24 September 1971) was a Welsh professional footballer. He spent the majority of his career with Cardiff City, making over 350 appearances in all competitions and playing in the club's first seasons in the Football League. He also played for the Wales national football team, winning 8 caps.

== Career ==
Evans was born in Bala. As a youngster he worked as an apprentice printer while playing for local side Bala Wanderers, despite his three older brothers playing for Bala Press. He joined Wrexham in 1908 but sustained a serious shoulder injury and was told he may never play football again. He decided to move to South Wales to continue his work as an apprentice printer and began playing for Cwmparc and was spotted by Cardiff City, becoming the first player to be officially bought by the team when he signed for six shillings. Club secretary Bartley Wilson later remarked that the fee "was all we had and included his fare from Treorchy!"

He made his first appearance for the club on 1 September 1910 in a friendly match to mark the opening of Cardiff's new ground Ninian Park against Aston Villa. Evans scored Cardiff's first ever goal at the ground in a 2–1 defeat, rounding a defender before shooting low past the opposition goalkeeper. Evans even helped construct the ground, earning 35 shillings a week for playing plus bonuses for undertaking other jobs at the ground. Later the same month, Evans scored his first competitive goal for the side on his league debut, helping his side to a 4–1 victory over Ton Pentre on the opening day of the 1910–11 Southern Football League season. In his first season, Evans scored 11 times in the Southern League, the second highest tally in the squad, including a hat-trick during a 7–1 win over Chesham in January 1911.

In 1912 he became the first ever Cardiff City player to receive a call-up for the Wales squad when he was called up to replace Ted Vizard for a match against Ireland. Evans possessed a cannonball shot which was eventually nicknamed the "Bala bang" on account of the fearsome power he put into his shots. His shots were so ferocious that one goalkeeper once broke his wrist attempting to stop the ball and a Manchester City goalkeeper was knocked out cold by another shot. He was a regular for Cardiff during the decade, only leaving the club to serve in World War I before returning. A consistent scorer he went on to score 52 goals in 170 Southern league appearances before moving into a more orthodox position for Cardiff's entry into the football league in 1920.

Evans eventually left Ninian Park in 1926 to join up with former Cardiff teammate Joe Clennell at Bristol Rovers, where he spent two years before retiring. He died in Cardiff on 24 September 1971.

His shirt and runners-up medal from the 1925 FA Cup Final, as well as his first cap for Wales, are now displayed in the boardroom of Cardiff City after being bought at auction by one of the club's directors, Steve Borley.

== Honours ==
Cardiff City

- FA Cup runner-up: 1924–25
