= George West (footballer) =

English footballer

Personal information
- Date of birth: 21 October 1889
- Place of birth: Wardley, England
- Date of death: 1976 (aged 86–87)
- Height: 5 ft 8 1/2 in (1.74 m)
- Position: Forward

Senior career*
Years	Team	Apps	(Gls)
19??–1913	Wallsend		
1913–1921	Cardiff City	104	(36)
1921–1922	Stockport County	3	(0)
- * Club domestic league appearances and goals

George West (21 October 1889 – 1976) was an English professional footballer. During his career, he made over 100 appearances in the Southern League and the Football League during spells with Cardiff City and Stockport County.

== Career ==
Born in Wardley, West was playing for Wallsend when he was spotted by Cardiff City manager Fred Stewart who was in the process of building a side following the club's decision to become fully professional three years earlier. Signed as a replacement for John Burton, West adapted quickly to the Southern Football League, finishing as the club's top scorer for two consecutive seasons between 1913 and 1915. His spell with the club was interrupted due to the outbreak of World War I but he returned to Ninian Park following the return of league football in 1919, scoring both goals in a 2–1 victory over Wrexham during the 1920 Welsh Cup final, and remained with the club following their move into the Football League in 1920. After missing just two matches in the Second Division in the opening five months of the 1920–21 season, West eventually lost his place in the first-team to Harry Nash and made just one further appearance during the season as the club achieved promotion to the First Division. He remained with the club at the start of the following season, again competing with Nash, but the arrival of Joe Clennell from Everton in October 1921 saw him fall further out of favour and he soon left the club to join Stockport County where he finished his professional career, making three league appearances for the side.

== Honours ==
Cardiff City

- Welsh Cup winner: 1920
