= Albert Barnett =

English footballer

Personal information
- Date of birth: 7 January 1892
- Place of birth: Altrincham, England
- Date of death: October 1941 (aged 49)
- Place of death: Altrincham, England
- Height: 5 ft 9 in (1.75 m)
- Positions: Defender; forward

Senior career*
Years	Team	Apps	(Gls)
1910–1911	Altrincham		
1911	Heywood United		
1911–1913	Macclesfield Town	37	(22)
1913–1914	Glossop	19	(2)
1914–1924	Cardiff City	56	(7)
1924–1925	Aberdare Athletic		
1925–1926	Fordsons		
1926	Wigan Borough	3	(0)
- * Club domestic league appearances and goals

Albert Barnett (7 January 1892 – October 1941) was an English professional footballer. During his career, he played in the Football League for Glossop, Cardiff City, Aberdare Athletic and Wigan Borough.

== Early life ==
Born in Altrincham, Barnett was one of 12 children of John, a brickmaker and labourer, and Elizabeth Barnett. The Barnett family later played a charity match in aid of Ancoats Hospital against another family at Hyde Road with a team composed of John Barnett's eleven sons.

== Career ==
=== Early career ===
Barnett began his footballing career with his hometown club Altrincham, making his debut as a teenager in the 1910–11 season, becoming the fourth member of his family to play for the club following three of his brothers. A fifth brother would also later play for the club and Leo Barnett would later become the sixth member of the family to play for the club in the 1950s. He had an unsuccessful trial with Bolton Wanderers, before leaving the club to join Heywood United in January 1911. In December 1911, he joined Macclesfield Town, playing for the first-team in both the Lancashire Combination and the Manchester Football League as the club fielded sides in both competitions. The following year, the club reverted to a single league and Barnett finished as top scorer during the 1912–13 season, scoring 23 goals in all competitions. His form attracted attention from several clubs and he attended a second unsuccessful trial with Bolton before joining Football League Second Division side Glossop, making his Football League debut on 20 September 1913 in a 1–0 defeat to Fulham.

=== Cardiff City ===
After one season with Glossop, Barnett joined Southern Football League side Cardiff City for a fee of £50, making his debut for the Bluebirds on 23 January 1915 in a 2–1 defeat to Brighton & Hove Albion. He scored his first goal for the club in their following match, a 5–0 victory over Crystal Palace, and kept his place in the first-team for the remainder of the season, scoring six times. The out break of World War I saw all league football suspended for the duration of the hostilities, during which Barnett appeared as a wartime guest player for Stockport County, Manchester United and Rochdale. He was later wounded in action during his war service and two of his brothers, Frank and Fred, were killed in action. When league football resumed in 1919, Barnett returned to Cardiff and, having originally arrived at the club as an inside-forward, he switched to playing as a full back in the opening months of the 1919–20 season and made 23 league appearances for the side.

In 1920, Cardiff joined the Football League and, after missing the opening game of the season, he appeared in the Bluebirds' first ever home fixture in the Football League, a 0–0 draw with Clapton Orient on 30 August 1920. However, on 28 March 1921, Barnett suffered a badly broken leg during a 1–0 victory over Leeds United. After recovering from the injury, Barnett attempted to return to first-team action, making one appearance the following season, but struggled to return to form and, after two further years with the club, he was released in 1924 having played in just one match in his final two years, a 1–1 draw with Newport County in the fourth round of the Welsh Cup on 17 March 1924.

=== Later career ===
Barnett subsequently joined Third Division South side Aberdare Athletic where he spent one season before joining Fordsons as a player-coach. In his one season in Ireland, Barnett helped the club win the 1926 FAI Cup, defeating Shamrock Rovers in the final. He returned to England in 1926 and was offered a one-month trial with Wigan Borough, making his debut for the club in a 3–1 defeat against New Brighton on 18 September 1926. However, in his third appearance for the club, he suffered another broken leg during a tackle with an opposition player and was forced into retirement.

== Later life ==
Following his retirement from football, Barnett worked as a plumber. He died in October 1941 in Altrincham.

== Honours ==
Fordsons

- FAI Cup winner: 1926
