= 1982–83 Liverpool F.C. season =

English football club season

Liverpool F.C.
1982–83 season
- Chairman: John Smith
- Manager: Bob Paisley
- First Division: Champions
- FA Cup: Fifth round
- League Cup: Winners
- FA Charity Shield: Winners
- European Cup: Quarter-finals
- Top goalscorer: League: Ian Rush (24); All: Ian Rush (31)
Home colours	Away colours

The 1982–83 season was Liverpool Football Club's 91st season in existence and their 21st consecutive season in the First Division. After winning the title previous season, Liverpool F.C. regained and won their fourteenth league title. They also won the Football League Cup for the third successive season beating Manchester United 2-1 at Wembley Stadium.

However, Liverpool did not regain the European Cup, having been knocked out by Widzew Łódź in the quarter-finals and surprisingly being knocked out by Brighton & Hove Albion in the fifth round of the FA Cup. Liverpool lost 5 of their last 7 league games and drew the other two, yet they finished the season eleven points ahead of the second-placed Watford.

After nine years, Bob Paisley had decided to retire after winning six league championships, three European Cups, three League Cups, four FA Charity Shields, one European Super Cup and one UEFA Cup.

== Squad ==
=== Goalkeepers ===
- (England) Bob Wardle
- (Zimbabwe) Bruce Grobbelaar

=== Defenders ===
- (England) Phil Neal
- (Scotland) Alan Hansen
- (Scotland) John McGregor
- (England) Phil Thompson
- (England) Alan Kennedy
- (Republic of Ireland) Mark Lawrenson

=== Midfielders ===
- (Australia) Craig Johnston
- (England) Sammy Lee
- (England) Terry McDermott
- (Scotland) Graeme Souness
- (Republic of Ireland) Ronnie Whelan
- (Scotland) Steve Nicol

=== Attackers ===
- (Scotland) Kenny Dalglish
- (England) David Fairclough
- (England) Howard Gayle
- (England) David Hodgson
- (Wales) Ian Rush

== Squad statistics ==
=== Appearances and goals ===
No.	Pos	Nat	Player	Total		Division 1		FA Cup		Charity Shield		League Cup		European Cup	
No.	Pos	Nat	Player	Apps	Goals	Apps	Goals	Apps	Goals	Apps	Goals	Apps	Goals	Apps	Goals
	FW	(Scotland) SCO	Kenny Dalglish	58	20	42+0	18	3+0	1	1+0	0	7+0	0	5+0	1
	FW	(England) ENG	David Fairclough	11	4	3+5	3	0+0	0	0+0	0	0+2	1	0+1	0
	GK	(Zimbabwe) ZIM	Bruce Grobbelaar	60	0	42+0	0	3+0	0	1+0	0	8+0	0	6+0	0
	DF	(Scotland) SCO	Alan Hansen	52	0	34+0	0	3+0	0	1+0	0	8+0	0	6+0	0
	FW	(England) ENG	David Hodgson	37	9	20+3	4	3+0	1	0+1	0	4+1	2	3+2	2
	MF	(Australia) AUS	Craig Johnston	46	10	30+3	7	2+1	1	0+0	0	6+0	1	4+0	1
	DF	(England) ENG	Alan Kennedy	60	6	42+0	3	3+0	0	1+0	0	8+0	1	6+0	2
	DF	(England) ENG	Mark Lawrenson	55	7	40+0	5	3+0	0	1+0	0	8+0	2	3+0	0
	MF	(England) ENG	Sammy Lee	58	3	40+0	3	3+0	0	1+0	0	8+0	0	6+0	0
	MF	(England) ENG	Terry McDermott	3	0	0+2	0	0+0	0	0+0	0	0+0	0	1+0	0
	DF	(England) ENG	Phil Neal	60	11	42+0	8	3+0	0	1+0	0	8+0	1	6+0	2
	MF	(Scotland) SCO	Steve Nicol	4	0	2+2	0	0+0	0	0+0	0	0+0	0	0+0	0
	FW	(Wales) WAL	Ian Rush	51	31	34+0	24	3+0	2	1+0	1	8+0	2	5+0	2
	MF	(Scotland) SCO	Graeme Souness	59	11	41+0	9	3+0	0	1+0	0	8+0	2	6+0	0
	DF	(England) ENG	Phil Thompson	34	0	24+0	0	0+0	0	1+0	0	4+0	0	4+1	0
	MF	(Republic of Ireland) IRL	Ronnie Whelan	41	7	26+2	2	1+0	0	1+0	0	3+3	2	5+0	3

== League table ==
Pos	Team	Pld	W	D	L	GF	GA	GD	Pts	Qualification or relegation
1	Liverpool (C)	42	24	10	8	87	37	+50	82	Qualification for the European Cup first round
2	Watford	42	22	5	15	74	57	+17	71	Qualification for the UEFA Cup first round
3	Manchester United	42	19	13	10	56	38	+18	70	Qualification for the Cup Winners' Cup first round (Note: Manchester United qualified for the European Cup Winners' Cup first round as the 1982–83 FA Cup winners.)
4	Tottenham Hotspur	42	20	9	13	65	50	+15	69	Qualification for the UEFA Cup first round
5	Nottingham Forest	42	20	9	13	62	50	+12	69	Qualification for the UEFA Cup first round

Source: World Football
Rules for classification: 1) Points; 2) Goal difference; 3) Goals scored
(C) Champions

== Results ==
=== First Division ===
Date	Opponents	Venue	Result	Scorers	Attendance	Report 1	Report 2
28-Aug-82	West Bromwich Albion	H	2–0	Lee 57' Neal (pen 72)	35,652	Report	Report
31-Aug-82	Birmingham City	A	0–0		20,176	Report	Report
04-Sep-82	Arsenal	A	2–0	Hodgson 41' Neal 83'	36,429	Report	Report
07-Sep-82	Nottingham Forest	H	4–3	Hodgson 11', 20' Souness 81' Rush 89'	27,145	Report	Report
11-Sep-82	Luton Town	H	3–3	Souness 32' Rush 44' Johnston 75'	33,694	Report	Report
18-Sep-82	Swansea City	A	3–0	Rush 15', 23' Johnston 84'	20,322	Report	Report
25-Sep-82	Southampton	H	5–0	Whelan 6', 71' Souness 22' Lawrenson 41', 67'	32,996	Report	Report
02-Oct-82	Ipswich Town	A	0–1		24,342	Report	Report
09-Oct-82	West Ham United	A	1–3	Souness 77'	32,500	Report	Report
16-Oct-82	Manchester United	H	0–0		40,853	Report	Report
23-Oct-82	Stoke City	A	1–1	Lawrenson 27'	29,411	Report	Report
30-Oct-82	Brighton & Hove Albion	H	3–1	Lawrenson 19' Dalglish 37', 43'	27,929	Report	Report
06-Nov-82	Everton	A	5–0	Rush 11', 51', 71', 85' Lawrenson 55'	52,741	Report	Report
13-Nov-82	Coventry City	H	4–0	Dalglish 8' Rush 24', 73', 82'	27,870	Report	Report
20-Nov-82	Notts County	A	2–1	Johnston 52' Dalglish 55'	16,914	Report	Report
27-Nov-82	Tottenham Hotspur	H	3–0	Neal (pen 20) Dalglish 49', 78'	40,691	Report	Report
04-Dec-82	Norwich City	A	0–1		22,909	Report	Report
11-Dec-82	Watford	H	3–1	Rush 22' Neal (2 pens 34), 43'	36,690	Report	Report
18-Dec-82	Aston Villa	A	4–2	Hodgson 5' Dalglish 9' Kennedy 27' Rush 88'	34,568	Report	Report
27-Dec-82	Manchester City	H	5–2	Dalglish 18', 24', 86' Neal 22' Rush 64'	44,664	Report	Report
28-Dec-82	Sunderland	A	0–0		35,041	Report	Report
01-Jan-83	Notts County	H	5–1	Rush 15', 78', 87' Dalglish 30', 72'	33,643	Report	Report
03-Jan-83	Arsenal	H	3–1	Rush 23' Souness 53' Dalglish 70'	37,713	Report	Report
15-Jan-83	West Bromwich Albion	A	1–0	Rush 90'	24,560	Report	Report
22-Jan-83	Birmingham City	H	1–0	Neal 8'	30,986	Report	Report
05-Feb-83	Luton Town	A	3–1	Rush 32' Kennedy 43' Souness 79'	18,434	Report	Report
12-Feb-83	Ipswich Town	H	1–0	Dalglish 66'	34,976	Report	Report
26-Feb-83	Manchester United	A	1–1	Dalglish 39'	57,397	Report	Report
05-Mar-83	Stoke City	H	5–1	Dalglish 7', 47' Neal 35' Johnston 76' Souness 89'	30,020	Report	Report
12-Mar-83	West Ham United	H	3–0	Own goal 50' Lee 55' Rush 67'	28,511	Report	Report
19-Mar-83	Everton	H	0–0		44,737	Report	Report
22-Mar-83	Brighton & Hove Albion	A	2–2	Rush 76', 85'	25,030	Report	Report
02-Apr-83	Sunderland	H	1–0	Souness 72'	35,821	Report	Report
04-Apr-83	Manchester City	A	4–0	Souness 31' Fairclough 44', 86' Kennedy 83'	35,647	Report	Report
09-Apr-83	Swansea City	H	3–0	Rush 57' Lee 72' Fairclough 86'	30,010	Report	Report
12-Apr-83	Coventry City	A	0–0		14,821	Report	Report
16-Apr-83	Southampton	A	2–3	Dalglish 13' Johnston 16'	23,578	Report	Report
23-Apr-83	Norwich City	H	0–2		37,022	Report	Report
30-Apr-83	Tottenham Hotspur	A	0–2		44,907	Report	Report
02-May-83	Nottingham Forest	A	0–1		25,107	Report	Report
07-May-83	Aston Villa	H	1–1	Johnston 82'	39,939	Report	Report
14-May-83	Watford	A	1–2	Johnston 62'	27,173	Report	Report

=== FA Charity Shield ===
21 August 1982

Liverpool	1–0	Tottenham Hotspur
Rush 32'	Report

Wembley Stadium, London
Attendance: 82,500

Liverpool	Tottenham Hotspur

GK	1	(Zimbabwe) Bruce Grobbelaar
RB	2	(England) Phil Neal
CB	4	(Republic of Ireland) Mark Lawrenson
CB	6	(Scotland) Alan Hansen
LB	3	(England) Alan Kennedy
RM	8	(England) Sammy Lee
CM	10	(Republic of Ireland) Ronnie Whelan
CM	11	(Scotland) Graeme Souness (c)
LM	5	(England) Phil Thompson
CF	7	(Scotland) Kenny Dalglish	(substituted off) 69'
CF	9	(Wales) Ian Rush
Substitutes:
MF	12	(England) David Hodgson	(substituted on) 69'
Manager:
(England) Bob Paisley

GK	1	(England) Ray Clemence
DF	6	(England) Gary O'Reilly
DF	3	(England) Paul Miller
DF	4	(England) John Lacy
DF	2	(Republic of Ireland) Chris Hughton
MF	10	(England) Glenn Hoddle
MF	5	(England) Micky Hazard
MF	7	(England) Gary Mabbutt
MF	9	(Republic of Ireland) Tony Galvin
FW	8	(Scotland) Steve Archibald
FW	11	(England) Garth Crooks
Substitutes:
DF	12	(England) Steve Perryman
FW	14	(England) Mark Falco
Manager:
(England) Keith Burkinshaw

=== FA Cup ===
Date	Opponents	Venue	Result	Scorers	Attendance	Report 1	Report 2
08-Jan-83	Blackburn Rovers	A	2–1	Hodgson 29' Rush 45'	21,967	Report	Report
29-Jan-83	Stoke City	H	2–0	Dalglish 23' Rush 88'	36,666	Report	Report
20-Feb-83	Brighton & Hove Albion	H	1–2	Johnston 70'	44,868	Report	Report

=== League Cup ===
Date	Opponents	Venue	Result	Scorers	Attendance	Report 1	Report 2
05-Oct-82	Ipswich Town	A	2–1	Rush 18', 64'	19,328	Report	Report
26-Oct-82	Ipswich Town	H	2–0	Whelan 7' Lawrenson 43'	17,698	Report	Report
10-Nov-82	Rotherham United	H	1–0	Johnston 79'	20,412	Report	Report
30-Nov-82	Norwich City	H	2–0	Lawrenson 42' Fairclough 79'	13,235	Report	Report
18-Jan-83	West Ham United	H	2–1	Hodgson 68' Souness 87'	23,953	Report	Report
08-Feb-83	Burnley	H	3–0	Souness 41' Neal (pen 71) Hodgson 80'	33,520	Report	Report
15-Feb-83	Burnley	A	0–1		20,000	Report	Report

Final

26 March 1983
15:00

Liverpool	2–1	Manchester United
Kennedy 75'; Whelan 98'	Report	Whiteside 12'

Wembley Stadium, London
Attendance: 99,304
Referee: George Courtney (County Durham)

Liverpool	Manchester United

GK	1	(Zimbabwe) Bruce Grobbelaar
RB	2	(England) Phil Neal
LB	3	(England) Alan Kennedy
CB	4	(Republic of Ireland) Mark Lawrenson
LM	5	(Republic of Ireland) Ronnie Whelan
CB	6	(Scotland) Alan Hansen
CF	7	(Scotland) Kenny Dalglish
RM	8	(England) Sammy Lee
CF	9	(Wales) Ian Rush
CM	10	(Australia) Craig Johnston	(substituted off) 83'
CM	11	(Scotland) Graeme Souness (c)
Substitute:
FW	12	(England) David Fairclough	(substituted on) 83'
Manager:
(England) Bob Paisley

GK	1	(England) Gary Bailey
RB	2	(England) Mike Duxbury
LB	3	(Scotland) Arthur Albiston
CM	4	(England) Remi Moses
CB	5	(Republic of Ireland) Kevin Moran	(substituted off) 69'
CB	6	(Scotland) Gordon McQueen
CM	7	(England) Ray Wilkins
LM	8	(Netherlands) Arnold Mühren
CF	9	(Republic of Ireland) Frank Stapleton
CF	10	(Northern Ireland) Norman Whiteside (c)
RM	11	(England) Steve Coppell
Substitute:
FW	12	(Scotland) Lou Macari	(substituted on) 69'
Manager:
(England) Ron Atkinson

Match rules

- 90 minutes.
- 30 minutes of extra-time if necessary.
- Replay if scores still level.
- One named substitute.
- Maximum of one substitution.

=== European Cup ===
Date	Opponents	Venue	Result	Scorers	Attendance	Report 1	Report 2
14-Sep-82	Dundalk	A	4–1	Whelan 7', 26' Rush 31' Hodgson 75'	16,500	Report	Report
28-Sep-82	Dundalk	H	1–0	Whelan 81'	12,021	Report	Report
19-Oct-82	HJK Helsinki	A	0–1		5,722	Report	Report
02-Nov-82	HJK Helsinki	H	5–0	Dalglish 26' Johnston 30' Neal 44' Kennedy 61', 69'	16,434	Report	Report
02-Mar-83	Widzew Łódź	A	0–2		45,531	Report	Report
16-Mar-83	Widzew Łódź	H	3–2	Neal (pen 14) Rush 80' Hodgson 89'	44,494	Report	Report
