= 1981–82 Tottenham Hotspur F.C. season =

English football club season

Tottenham Hotspur
1981–82 season
- Chairman: Arthur Richardson
- Manager: (England) Keith Burkinshaw
- Stadium: White Hart Lane
- First Division: 4th
- FA Cup: Winners
- League Cup: Runners-up
- Cup Winners' Cup: Semi-finals
- Charity Shield: Title shared
- Top goalscorer: League: Garth Crooks (13); All: Garth Crooks (18)
Home colours	Away colours

During the 1981–82 English football season, Tottenham Hotspur competed in the Football League First Division.

== Season summary ==
Tottenham enjoyed a hugely successful season. They finished fourth in the First Division, their highest finish in ten years, won a second successive FA Cup (eventually managing to defeat Second Division Queens Park Rangers 1–0 in the replay after a 1–1 draw in the final), reached the final of the League Cup (losing to Liverpool 3–1 in extra time), were joint winners of the Charity Shield (drawing 2–2 with the previous season's champions Aston Villa) and reached the semi-final of the Cup Winners' Cup (losing 2–1 on aggregate to tournament winners Barcelona).

== Players ==
=== First-team squad ===
Squad at end of season

Note: Flags indicate national team as defined under FIFA eligibility rules; some limited exceptions apply. Players may hold more than one non-FIFA nationality.

Pos.	Nation	Player
GK	ENG	Milija Aleksic
GK	ENG	Ray Clemence
GK	ENG	Tony Parks
DF	ENG	Pat Corbett
DF	ENG	John Lacy
DF	ENG	Giorgio Mazzon
DF	ENG	Paul Miller
DF	ENG	Gary O'Reilly
DF	ENG	Graham Roberts
DF	WAL	Mark Bowen
DF	WAL	Paul Price (Note: Price was born in St Albans, England, but also qualified to represent Wales internationally and made his international debut for Wales in 1980.)
DF	SCO	Gordon Smith
DF	IRL	Chris Hughton (Note: Hughton was born in Newham, England, but also qualified to represent the Republic of Ireland internationally through his mother and made his international debut for the Republic of Ireland in 1979.)
MF	ENG	Garry Brooke

Pos.	Nation	Player
MF	ENG	Ian Crook
MF	ENG	Micky Hazard
MF	ENG	Glenn Hoddle
MF	ENG	Steve Perryman
MF	SCO	Ally Dick
MF	IRL	Tony Galvin
MF	ARG	Ossie Ardiles
MF	ARG	Ricardo Villa
FW	ENG	Garth Crooks
FW	ENG	Mark Falco
FW	ENG	Terry Gibson
FW	ENG	Chris Jones
FW	SCO	Steve Archibald

== Transfers ==
=== In ===
Date from	Position	Nationality	Name	From	Fee	Ref.
June 1981	DF	(England)	Paul Price	Luton Town	£250,000	
August 1981	GK	(England)	Ray Clemence	Liverpool	£300,000	

=== Out ===
Date	Position	Nationality	Name	To	Fee	Ref.
August 1981	DF	(England)	Don McAllister	Charlton Athletic	Free	(Note: It is noted that Tottenham had written a letter to McAllister to offer him a new contract, however he himself said he never received any letter and subsequently joined Charlton on a free.)

== Competitions ==
=== Charity Shield ===
22 August 1981 Final	Aston Villa	2–2	Tottenham Hotspur	London
15:00	Withe		Falco	Stadium: Wembley Stadium; Attendance: 92,500; Referee: Alf Grey

=== First Division ===
==== League table ====
Pos	Team	Pld	W	D	L	GF	GA	GD	Pts	Qualification or relegation
2	Ipswich Town	42	26	5	11	75	53	+22	83	Qualification for the UEFA Cup first round
3	Manchester United	42	22	12	8	59	29	+30	78	Qualification for the UEFA Cup first round
4	Tottenham Hotspur	42	20	11	11	67	48	+19	71	Qualification for the Cup Winners' Cup first round (Note: Tottenham Hotspur qualified for the European Cup Winners' Cup first round as the 1981–82 FA Cup winners.)
5	Arsenal	42	20	11	11	48	37	+11	71	Qualification for the UEFA Cup first round
6	Swansea City	42	21	6	15	58	51	+7	69	Qualification for the Cup Winners' Cup preliminary round (Note: Swansea City qualified for the European Cup Winners' Cup preliminary round as the 1982 Welsh Cup winners.)

Source: World Football
Rules for classification: 1) Points; 2) Goal difference; 3) Goals scored

==== Results ====
- 6 February: Tottenham Hotspur 6–1 Wolverhampton Wanderers
- 20 February: Tottenham Hotspur 2-0 Manchester City

=== FA Cup ===
2 January 1982 Third round	Tottenham Hotspur	1–0	Arsenal	London
				Stadium: White Hart Lane

23 January 1982 Fourth round	Tottenham Hotspur	1–0	Leeds United	London
				Stadium: White Hart Lane

13 February 1982 Fifth round	Tottenham Hotspur	1–0	Aston Villa	London
				Stadium: White Hart Lane

6 March 1982 Quarter-finals	Chelsea	2–3	Tottenham Hotspur	London
				Stadium: Stamford Bridge

3 April 1982 Semi-final	Tottenham Hotspur	2–0	Leicester City	Birmingham
15:00				Stadium: Villa Park

22 May 1982 Final	Tottenham Hotspur	1–1	Queens Park Rangers	London
15:00	Hoddle 110'		Fenwick 115'	Stadium: Wembley Stadium; Attendance: 100,000; Referee: Clive White (Harrow)

27 May 1982 Final (reply)	Tottenham Hotspur	1–0	Queens Park Rangers	London
19:30	Hoddle pen' (6)			Stadium: Wembley Stadium; Attendance: 90,000; Referee: Clive White (Harrow)

=== League Cup ===
7 October 1981 Second Round; First leg	Tottenham Hotspur	1–0	Manchester United	London
				Stadium: White Hart Lane

28 October 1981 Second round Second leg	Manchester United	0–1 (0–2 agg.)	Tottenham Hotspur	Manchester
				Stadium: Old Trafford

11 November 1981 Third round	Tottenham Hotspur	2–0	Wrexham	London
				Stadium: White Hart Lane

2 December 1981 Fourth round	Tottenham Hotspur	1–0	Fulham	London
				Stadium: White Hart Lane

18 January 1982 Fifth round	Tottenham Hotspur	1–0	Nottingham Forest	London
				Stadium: White Hart Lane

3 February 1982 Semi-finals; First leg	West Bromwich Albion	0–0	Tottenham Hotspur	West Bromwich
				Stadium: The Hawthorns

10 February 1982 Semi-finals; Second leg	Tottenham Hotspur	1–0 (1–0 agg.)	West Bromwich Albion	London
				Stadium: White Hart Lane

13 March 1982 Final	Liverpool	3–1	Tottenham Hotspur	London
15:00 GMT	Whelan 87' (111); Rush 119'		Archibald 11'	Stadium: Wembley Stadium; Referee: Peter Willis ( County Durham)

=== Cup Winners' Cup ===
16 September 1981 First round First leg	Ajax (Netherlands)	1–3	(England) Tottenham Hotspur	Netherlands
	Lerby 68'		Falco 19' (34); Villa 67'	Stadium: De Meer Stadion

30 September 1981 First round Second leg	Tottenham Hotspur (England)	3–0 (6–1 agg.)	(Netherlands) Ajax	London
	Galvin 69'; Falco 76'; Ardiles 81'			Stadium: White Hart Lane

21 October 1981 Second round First leg	Dundalk (Republic of Ireland)	1–1	(England) Tottenham Hotspur	Ireland
	Fairclough 82'		Crooks 63'	Stadium: Oriel Park

4 November 1981 Second round Second leg	Tottenham Hotspur (England)	1–0 (2–1 agg.)	(Republic of Ireland) Dundalk	London
	Crooks 63'			Stadium: White Hart Lane

3 March 1982 Third round First leg	Tottenham Hotspur (England)	2–0	(Germany) Eintracht Frankfurt	London
	Miller 59'; Hazard 80'			Stadium: White Hart Lane

3 March 1982 Third round Second leg	Eintracht Frankfurt (Germany)	2–1 (2–3 agg.)	(England) Tottenham Hotspur	Germany
	Borchers 2'; Cha Bum-kun 15'		Hoddle 80'	Stadium: Waldstadion

7 April 1982 Semi-finals; First leg	Tottenham Hotspur (England)	1 – 1	(Spain) Barcelona	London
	Roberts 85'		Olmo 60'	Stadium: White Hart Lane; Referee: Egbert Mulder (Netherlands)

21 April 1982 Semi-finals; Second leg	Barcelona (Spain)	1–0 (2–1 agg.)	(England) Tottenham Hotspur	Barcelona
	Simonsen 46'			Stadium: Camp Nou

== Statistics ==
=== Appearances and goals ===
Pos.	Name	Division One		FA Cup		EFL Cup		Charity Shield		Cup Winners Cup		Total	
Pos.	Name	Apps	Goals	Apps	Goals	Apps	Goals	Apps	Goals	Apps	Goals	Apps	Goals
GK	(England) Milija Aleksic	2	0	0	0	0	0	0	0	0	0	2	0
FW	(Scotland) Steve Archibald	26+1	7	4+1	1	5	2	1	0	7	0	43+2	10
MF	(Argentina) Ossie Ardiles	26	3	5	0	8	1	1	0	6	1	46	5
MF	(England) Garry Brooke	12+4	4	0+2	0	0	0	0	0	0	0+1	12+7	4
GK	(England) Ray Clemence	38	0	7	0	8	0	1	0	8	0	62	0
DF	(England) Pat Corbett	3+1	1	0	0	0	0	0	0	0	0	3+1	1
MF	(England) Ian Crook	3+1	0	0	0	0	0	0	0	0	0	3+1	0
FW	(England) Garth Crooks	27	13	7	3	7	0	0	0	5	2	46	18
MF	(Scotland) Ally Dick	1	0	0	0	0	0	0	0	0	0	1	0
FW	(England) Mark Falco	21	5	3	1	4	0	1	2	3+2	3	32+2	11
MF	(Republic of Ireland) Tony Galvin	32	3	7	0	8	0	1	0	8	1	56	4
FW	(England) Terry Gibson	1	0	0	0	0	0	0	0	0	0	1	0
MF	(England) Micky Hazard	26+2	5	4+1	1	5+1	3	0	0	6	1	41+4	10
MF	(England) Glenn Hoddle	34	10	7	3	8	1	1	0	8	1	58	15
DF	(Republic of Ireland) Chris Hughton	37	2	7	0	8	1	1	0	8	0	61	3
FW	(England) Chris Jones	3+4	0	0	0	0	0	0	0	0+1	0	3+5	0
DF	(England) John Lacy	7+5	0	0	0	0	0	0	0	0+1	0	7+6	0
DF	(England) Giorgio Mazzon	0	0	0	0	0+1	0	0	0	0	0	0+1	0
DF	(England) Paul Miller	35	0	6+1	0	8	0	1	0	7	1	57+1	1
DF	(England) Gary O'Reilly	4+1	0	0	0	0	0	0	0	0	0	4+1	0
GK	(England) Tony Parks	2	0	0	0	0	0	0	0	0	0	2	0
MF	(England) Steve Perryman	42	1	7	0	8	0	1	0	8	0	66	1
DF	(Wales) Paul Price	18+3	0	5	0	3	0	0	0	4	0	30+3	0
DF	(England) Graham Roberts	35+2	6	6	0	5	0	1	0	6+1	1	53+3	7
DF	(Scotland) Gordon Smith	1+1	0	0	0	0	0	0	0	0+1	0	1+2	0
MF	(Argentina) Ricardo Villa	26+1	8	2	0	3+1	0	1	0	4+1	1	36+3	9

Last updated: 15 May 1999

=== Goal scorers ===
Last updated: 26 July 2020.

Rnk	Pos	Player	Division One	FA Cup	EFL Cup	Charity Shield	Cup Winners Cup	Total
1	FW	(England) Garth Crooks	13	3	0	0	2	18
2	MF	(England) Glenn Hoddle	10	3	1	0	1	15
3	FW	(England) Mark Falco	5	1	0	2	3	11
4	FW	(Scotland) Steve Archibald	7	1	2	0	0	10
4	MF	(England) Micky Hazard	5	1	3	0	1	10
6	MF	(Argentina) Ricardo Villa	8	0	0	0	1	9
7	DF	(England) Graham Roberts	6	0	0	0	1	7
8	MF	(Argentina) Ossie Ardiles	3	0	1	0	1	5
9	MF	(England) Garry Brooke	4	0	0	0	0	4
9	MF	(Republic of Ireland) Tony Galvin	3	0	0	0	1	4
11	DF	(Republic of Ireland) Chris Hughton	2	0	1	0	0	3
12	DF	(England) Pat Corbett	1	0	0	0	0	1
12	DF	(England) Paul Miller	0	0	0	0	1	1
12	MF	(England) Steve Perryman	1	0	0	0	0	1
TOTALS			68	9	8	2	12	99

=== Clean sheets ===
Last updated: 26 July 2020.

Rnk	Player	Division One	FA Cup	EFL Cup	Charity Shield	Cup Winners Cup	Total
1	(England) Ray Clemence	13	5	7	0	3	28
TOTALS		13	5	7	0	3	28

== Works cited ==
- Goodwin, Bob (1992). The Spurs Alphabet. ACL & Polar Publishing (UK) Ltd. ISBN 0-9514862-8-4.
