= 1982 FA Charity Shield =

Liverpool	Tottenham Hotspur
1	0
- Date: 21 August 1982
- Venue: Wembley Stadium, London
- Referee: NJ Ashley (Nantwich)
- Attendance: 82,500

The 1982 FA Charity Shield was a football match between Liverpool and Tottenham Hotspur at Wembley on 21 August 1982. Liverpool, managed by Bob Paisley had won the 1981–82 Football League, and Tottenham, managed by Keith Burkinshaw had won the 1982 FA Cup Final for a consecutive season. In doing so the teams qualified for the season opener which was played the week before the new league season kicked off. Ian Rush scored the only goal in the thirty-second minute to win the trophy for a ninth time for Liverpool.

== Match details ==
21 August 1982

Liverpool	1–0	Tottenham Hotspur
Rush 32'	Report

Wembley Stadium, London
Attendance: 82,500

Liverpool	Tottenham Hotspur

GK	1	(Zimbabwe) Bruce Grobbelaar
RB	2	(England) Phil Neal
LB	3	(England) Alan Kennedy
CB	4	(England) Phil Thompson
CB	5	(Republic of Ireland) Mark Lawrenson
CB	6	(Scotland) Alan Hansen
CF	7	(Scotland) Kenny Dalglish	(substituted off) 69'
CM	8	(England) Sammy Lee
CF	9	(Wales) Ian Rush
CM	10	(Republic of Ireland) Ronnie Whelan
CM	11	(Scotland) Graeme Souness (c)
Substitutes:
MF	12	(England) Terry McDermott
GK	13	(England) Bob Wardle
MF	14	(England) David Hodgson	(substituted on) 69'
FW	15	(Australia) Craig Johnston
DF	16	(Scotland) Steve Nicol
Manager:
(England) Bob Paisley

GK	1	(England) Ray Clemence
DF	2	(Republic of Ireland) Chris Hughton
DF	3	(England) Paul Miller
DF	4	(England) Gary O'Reilly	(substituted off) 65'
MF	5	(England) Micky Hazard	(substituted off) 77'
DF	6	(England) John Lacy
MF	7	(England) Gary Mabbutt
FW	8	(Scotland) Steve Archibald
MF	9	(Republic of Ireland) Tony Galvin
MF	10	(England) Glenn Hoddle (c)
FW	11	(England) Garth Crooks
Substitutes:
DF	12	(England) Steve Perryman	(substituted on) 65'
GK	13	(England) Tony Parks
MF	14	(England) Ian Crook
FW	15	(England) Mark Falco	(substituted on) 77'
FW	16	(England) Garry Brooke
Manager:
(England) Keith Burkinshaw

== See also ==
- 1981–82 Football League
- 1981–82 FA Cup
