= 1984–85 Tottenham Hotspur F.C. season =

English football team season

Tottenham Hotspur
1984–85 season
- Chairman: Irving Scholar
- Manager: Peter Shreeves
- Stadium: White Hart Lane
- First Division: 3rd
- FA Cup: Fourth round
- Milk Cup: Fourth round
- UEFA Cup: Quarter-finals
- Top goalscorer: League: Mark Falco (22); All: Mark Falco (29)
- Highest home attendance: 48,108 v Everton (Division One, 3 April 1985)
- Lowest home attendance: 14,802 v Halifax Town (Milk Cup, 9 October 1984)
- Average home league attendance: 28,932
- Biggest win: 6–0 v Sporting Braga (H), UEFA Cup, 3 October 1984
- Biggest defeat: 1–5 v Watford (H), Division One, 11 May 1985

The 1984–85 season was the 103rd season in the history of Tottenham Hotspur Football Club and their 7th consecutively in the First Division.

== Summary ==
Peter Shreeves took charge as manager following the departure of Keith Burkinshaw and guided Spurs to a 3rd-place finish. They were title contenders for much of the season but ultimately failed to keep pace with a resurgent Everton side. A run of six defeats in eight home matches - one of them against Everton - cost Spurs dearly, although they went unbeaten in their last 15 matches away from White Hart Lane.

Spurs' defence of the UEFA Cup ended in the quarter-finals at the hands of Real Madrid. A 1–0 defeat in the first leg proved decisive and was their first ever home defeat in European competition. Domestically, Spurs lost a replay to Sunderland in the fourth round of the Milk Cup and were knocked out by Liverpool in the fourth round of the FA Cup.

== Squad ==
Substitute appearances indicated in brackets

Pos.	Nat.	Name	League		UEFA Cup		Milk Cup		FA Cup		Total	
Pos.	Nat.	Name	Apps	Goals	Apps	Goals	Apps	Goals	Apps	Goals	Apps	Goals
GK	ENG	Ray Clemence	42	0	8	0	5	0	3	0	58	0
GK	ENG	Tony Parks	0	0	0	0	0	0	0	0	0	0
DF	WAL	Mark Bowen	6	0	0	0	0	0	0	0	6	0
DF	ENG	Ian Culverhouse	0	0	0	0	0	0	0	0	0	0
DF	IRE	Chris Hughton	29(2)	1	6(1)	1	4	1	2(1)	0	41(4)	3
DF	ENG	Gary Mabbutt	15(10)	2	3(1)	0	2(2)	0	1(1)	0	21(14)	2
DF	ENG	Paul Miller	39	0	8	0	5	0	3	0	55	0
DF	ENG	Graham Roberts	40	7	7	1	4	1	3	0	54	9
DF	ENG	Gary Stevens	28	0	6	2	5	0	3	0	42	2
DF	ENG	Danny Thomas	14(2)	0	1(3)	0	1	0	0	0	16(5)	0
MF	ARG	Osvaldo Ardiles	10(1)	2	0	0	0	0	0	0	10(1)	2
MF	ENG	Garry Brooke	1(3)	1	0(3)	0	0	0	0	0	1(6)	1
MF	NIG	John Chiedozie	31(3)	5	7	0	5	0	3	0	46(3)	5
MF	ENG	Allan Cockram	0	0	0	0	0	0	0	0	0	0
MF	ENG	Richard Cooke	0	0	0(2)	0	0	0	0	0	0(2)	0
MF	ENG	Ian Crook	2(3)	1	0	0	0	0	0	0	2(3)	1
MF	SCO	Ally Dick	2	0	0(2)	0	0	0	0	0	2(2)	0
MF	IRE	Tony Galvin	38	4	7	1	3	0	3	1	51	6
MF	ENG	Micky Hazard	15(8)	4	7	1	3(1)	2	0	0	25(9)	7
MF	ENG	Glenn Hoddle	26(2)	8	4(2)	0	3	0	3	0	36(4)	8
MF	ENG	Steve Perryman	42	1	8	0	5	0	3	0	58	1
FW	ENG	Clive Allen	12(1)	7	4	2	3	1	0	0	19(1)	10
FW	ENG	Garth Crooks	22	10	4(2)	3	2	4	3	1	31(2)	18
FW	ENG	Mark Falco	42	22	8	4	5	2	3	1	58	29
FW	ENG	David Leworthy	6	3	0	0	0	0	0	0	6	3

== League table ==
Pos	Team	Pld	W	D	L	GF	GA	GD	Pts	Qualification or relegation
1	Everton (C)	42	28	6	8	88	43	+45	90	Qualified for the Football League Super Cup and disqualified from the European Cup
2	Liverpool	42	22	11	9	68	35	+33	77	Qualified for the Football League Super Cup and disqualified from the UEFA Cup
3	Tottenham Hotspur	42	23	8	11	78	51	+27	77	Qualified for the Football League Super Cup and disqualified from the UEFA Cup
4	Manchester United (Note: Manchester United would have qualified for the Cup Winners' Cup as FA Cup winners.)	42	22	10	10	77	47	+30	76	Qualified for the Football League Super Cup and disqualified from the European Cup Winners' Cup
5	Southampton	42	19	11	12	56	47	+9	68	Qualified for the Football League Super Cup and disqualified from the UEFA Cup

Source: World Football
Rules for classification: 1) Points; 2) Goal difference; 3) Goals scored
(C) Champions

== Results ==
=== First Division ===
25 August 1984 1	Everton	1–4	Tottenham Hotspur	Liverpool
	Heath 16' (pen.)		Falco 39'; Allen 41', 55'; Chiedozie 51'	Stadium: Goodison Park; Attendance: 35,630

27 August 1984 2	Tottenham Hotspur	2–2	Leicester City	London
	Roberts 36', 59' (pen.)		A. Smith 26'; Banks 78'	Stadium: White Hart Lane; Attendance: 30,046

1 September 1984 3	Tottenham Hotspur	3–1	Norwich City	London
	Galvin 26'; Chiedozie 53'; Falco 65'		Bertschin 83'	Stadium: White Hart Lane; Attendance: 24,947

4 September 1984 4	Sunderland	1–0	Tottenham Hotspur	Sunderland
	West 80' (pen.)			Stadium: Roker Park; Attendance: 18,895

8 September 1984 5	Sheffield Wednesday	2–1	Tottenham Hotspur	Sheffield
	Varadi 16'; Marwood 33'		Falco 24'	Stadium: Hillsborough; Attendance: 33,421

15 September 1984 6	Tottenham Hotspur	5–0	Queens Park Rangers	London
	Falco 21', 49'; Allen 57', 88'; Hazard 64'			Stadium: White Hart Lane; Attendance: 31,655

22 September 1984 7	Aston Villa	0–1	Tottenham Hotspur	Birmingham
			Chiedozie 73'	Stadium: Villa Park; Attendance: 22,409

29 September 1984 8	Tottenham Hotspur	4–2	Luton Town	London
	Hazard 21'; Perryman 36'; Falco 75'; Roberts 90' (pen.)		Moss 3'; Bunn 27'	Stadium: White Hart Lane; Attendance: 30,204

6 October 1984 9	Southampton	1–0	Tottenham Hotspur	Southampton
	Moran 30'			Stadium: The Dell; Attendance: 21,825

12 October 1984 10	Tottenham Hotspur	1–0	Liverpool	London
	Crooks 37'			Stadium: White Hart Lane; Attendance: 28,599

20 October 1984 11	Manchester United	1–0	Tottenham Hotspur	Stretford
	Hughes 68'			Stadium: Old Trafford; Attendance: 54,516

27 October 1984 12	Tottenham Hotspur	4–0	Stoke City	London
	Allen 5', 75'; Chiedozie 10'; Roberts 83' (pen.)			Stadium: White Hart Lane; Attendance: 23,470

3 November 1984 13	Tottenham Hotspur	2–3	West Bromwich Albion	London
	Hazard 17'; Chiedozie 80'		Statham 13' (pen.); Cross 53'; MacKenzie 75'	Stadium: White Hart Lane; Attendance: 24,494

10 November 1984 14	Nottingham Forest	1–2	Tottenham Hotspur	West Bridgford
	Davenport 56'		Hazard 53'; Galvin 73'	Stadium: City Ground; Attendance: 21,306

17 November 1984 15	Ipswich Town	0–3	Tottenham Hotspur	Ipswich
			Mabbutt 68'; Hoddle 76'; Allen 87'	Stadium: Portman Road; Attendance: 21,894

24 November 1984 16	Tottenham Hotspur	1–1	Chelsea	London
	Falco 46'		Dixon 5'	Stadium: White Hart Lane; Attendance: 31,197

1 December 1984 17	Coventry City	1–1	Tottenham Hotspur	Coventry
	Regis 90'		Falco 35'	Stadium: Highfield Road; Attendance: 14,518

8 December 1984 18	Tottenham Hotspur	3–1	Newcastle United	London
	Roberts 61' (pen.); Falco 64', 89'		Waddle 47'	Stadium: White Hart Lane; Attendance: 29,695

15 December 1984 19	Watford	1–2	Tottenham Hotspur	Watford
	Terry 63'		Falco 15'; Crooks 50'	Stadium: Vicarage Road; Attendance: 24,225

22 December 1984 20	Norwich City	1–2	Tottenham Hotspur	Norwich
	Deehan 71' (pen.)		Crooks 35'; Galvin 62'	Stadium: Carrow Road; Attendance: 17,682

26 December 1984 21	Tottenham Hotspur	2–2	West Ham United	London
	Mabbutt 17'; Crooks 34'		Cottee 42'; Goddard 49'	Stadium: White Hart Lane; Attendance: 37,198

29 December 1984 22	Tottenham Hotspur	2–0	Sunderland	London
	Hoddle 9'; Crooks 90'			Stadium: White Hart Lane; Attendance: 26,930

1 January 1985 23	Arsenal	1–2	Tottenham Hotspur	London
	Woodcock 42'		Crooks 59'; Falco 74'	Stadium: Highbury; Attendance: 48,714

12 January 1985 24	Queens Park Rangers	2–2	Tottenham Hotspur	London
	Bannister 18', 53'		Crooks 3'; Falco 63'	Stadium: Loftus Road; Attendance: 27,404

2 February 1985 25	Luton Town	2–2	Tottenham Hotspur	Luton
	B. Stein 48'; Nwajiobi 87'		Falco 84'; Roberts 89'	Stadium: Kenilworth Road; Attendance: 17,511

23 February 1985 26	West Bromwich Albion	0–1	Tottenham Hotspur	West Bromwich
			Falco 66'	Stadium: The Hawthorns; Attendance: 15,418

2 March 1985 27	Stoke City	0–1	Tottenham Hotspur	Stoke-on-Trent
			Crooks 46'	Stadium: Victoria Ground; Attendance: 12,553

12 March 1985 28	Tottenham Hotspur	1–2	Manchester United	London
	Falco 85'		Hughes 23'; Whiteside 83'	Stadium: White Hart Lane; Attendance: 42,918

16 March 1985 29	Liverpool	0–1	Tottenham Hotspur	Liverpool
			Crooks 71'	Stadium: Anfield; Attendance: 43,852

23 March 1985 30	Tottenham Hotspur	5–1	Southampton	London
	Ardiles 39'; Hoddle 64'; Falco 74'; Crooks 84'; Brooke 87'		Wallace 48'	Stadium: White Hart Lane; Attendance: 33,772

30 March 1985 31	Tottenham Hotspur	0–2	Aston Villa	London
			Rideout 21'; Walters 75'	Stadium: White Hart Lane; Attendance: 27,971

3 April 1985 32	Tottenham Hotspur	1–2	Everton	London
	Roberts 73'		Gray 9'; Steven 62'	Stadium: White Hart Lane; Attendance: 48,108

6 April 1985 33	West Ham United	1–1	Tottenham Hotspur	London
	Dickens 84'		Ardiles 43'	Stadium: Upton Park; Attendance: 24,435

13 April 1985 34	Leicester City	1–2	Tottenham Hotspur	Leicester
	Peake 80'		Hoddle 54'; Falco 90'	Stadium: Filbert Street; Attendance: 15,609

17 April 1985 35	Tottenham Hotspur	0–2	Arsenal	London
			Nicholas 21'; Talbot 89'	Stadium: White Hart Lane; Attendance: 40,399

20 April 1985 36	Tottenham Hotspur	2–3	Ipswich Town	London
	Leworthy 64', 90'		Sunderland 5'; Brennan 72'; Gates 89' (pen.)	Stadium: White Hart Lane; Attendance: 20,348

27 April 1985 37	Chelsea	1–1	Tottenham Hotspur	London
	Nevin 74'		Galvin 10'	Stadium: Stamford Bridge; Attendance: 26,310

4 May 1985 38	Tottenham Hotspur	4–2	Coventry City	London
	Falco 20', 89'; Hoddle 54'; Hughton 72'		Pearce 63' (pen.); Gibson 71'	Stadium: White Hart Lane; Attendance: 16,711

6 May 1985 39	Newcastle United	2–3	Tottenham Hotspur	Newcastle upon Tyne
	Beardsley 41' (pen.), 66' (pen.)		Leworthy 38'; Hoddle 69'; Crook 77'	Stadium: St James' Park; Attendance: 29,652

11 May 1985 40	Tottenham Hotspur	1–5	Watford	London
	Hoddle 67' (pen.)		Callaghan 14'; Blissett 17' (pen.); Barnes 28'; Thomas 79' (o.g.); West 83'	Stadium: White Hart Lane; Attendance: 23,167

14 May 1985 41	Tottenham Hotspur	2–0	Sheffield Wednesday	London
	Falco 23'; Hoddle 89' (pen.)			Stadium: White Hart Lane; Attendance: 15,679

17 May 1985 42	Tottenham Hotspur	1–0	Nottingham Forest	London
	Falco 22'			Stadium: White Hart Lane; Attendance: 20,075

=== UEFA Cup ===
19 September 1984 First round first leg	Sporting Braga	0–3	Tottenham Hotspur	Braga
			Falco 32', 42'; Galvin 44'	Stadium: Estádio 1º de Maio; Attendance: 25,000

3 October 1984 First round second leg	Tottenham Hotspur	6–0	Sporting Braga	London
	Stevens 11'; Hughton 16'; Crooks 27', 58', 82'; Falco 66'			Stadium: White Hart Lane; Attendance: 22,478

24 October 1984 Second round first leg	Club Brugge	2–1	Tottenham Hotspur	Bruges
	Ceulemans 6'; Jensen 82' (pen.)		Allen 85'	Stadium: Jan Breydel Stadium; Attendance: 25,000

7 November 1984 Second round second leg	Tottenham Hotspur	3–0	Club Brugge	London
	Hazard 5'; Allen 27'; Roberts 36'			Stadium: White Hart Lane; Attendance: 34,356

28 November 1984 Third round first leg	Tottenham Hotspur	2–0	Bohemians Prague	London
	Ondra 25' (o.g.); Stevens 80'			Stadium: White Hart Lane; Attendance: 27,971

12 December 1984 Third round second leg	Bohemians Prague	1–1	Tottenham Hotspur	Prague
	Prokeš 50'		Falco 7'	Stadium: Stadion Ďolíček; Attendance: 17,500

6 March 1985 Quarter-final first leg	Tottenham Hotspur	0–1	Real Madrid	London
			Perryman 15' (o.g.)	Stadium: White Hart Lane; Attendance: 39,914

20 March 1985 Quarter-final second leg	Real Madrid	0–0	Tottenham Hotspur	Madrid
				Stadium: Santiago Bernabéu Stadium; Attendance: 95,000

=== Milk Cup ===
26 September 1984 Second round first leg	Halifax Town	1–5	Tottenham Hotspur	Halifax
	Gallagher 78'		Falco 27', 56'; Crooks 69', 77', 83'	Stadium: The Shay; Attendance: 7,027

9 October 1984 Second round second leg	Tottenham Hotspur	4–0	Halifax Town	London
	Hazard 8', 76'; Hughton 36'; Crooks 66'			Stadium: White Hart Lane; Attendance: 14,802

31 October 1984 Third round	Tottenham Hotspur	1–0	Liverpool	London
	Allen 6'			Stadium: White Hart Lane; Attendance: 38,690

21 November 1984 Fourth round	Sunderland	0–0	Tottenham Hotspur	Sunderland
				Stadium: Roker Park; Attendance: 27,421

5 December 1984 Fourth round replay	Tottenham Hotspur	1–2	Sunderland	London
	Roberts 5' (pen.)		Walker 23'; Pickering 47'	Stadium: White Hart Lane; Attendance: 25,835

=== FA Cup ===
5 January 1985 Third round	Tottenham Hotspur	1–1	Charlton Athletic	London
	Crooks 5'		Aizlewood 51'	Stadium: White Hart Lane; Attendance: 29,029

23 January 1985 Third round replay	Charlton Athletic	1–2	Tottenham Hotspur	London
	Moore 88' (pen.)		Galvin 33'; Falco 85'	Stadium: The Valley; Attendance: 21,409

27 January 1985 Fourth round	Liverpool	1–0	Tottenham Hotspur	Liverpool
	Rush 17'			Stadium: Anfield; Attendance: 27,905
