= Milija Aleksic =

English footballer (1951–2012)

Personal information
- Full name: Milija Anthony Aleksic
- Date of birth: 14 April 1951
- Place of birth: Newcastle-under-Lyme, England
- Date of death: 17 October 2012 (aged 61)
- Place of death: Johannesburg, South Africa
- Height: 1.91 m (6 ft 3 in)
- Position: Goalkeeper

Senior career*
Years	Team	Apps	(Gls)
1968–1969	Port Vale	0	(0)
- Eastwood
- Stafford Rangers
1973–1976	Plymouth Argyle	32	(0)
1976	→ Oxford United (loan)	0	(0)
1976	→ Ipswich Town (loan)	0	(0)
1976–1979	Luton Town	77	(0)
1979–1982	Tottenham Hotspur	25	(0)
1982	→ Luton Town (loan)	4	(0)
1982–1983	Barnet	0	(0)
1983–1984	Wits University		
1985–1987	Durban City		
Total		138+	(0)
- * Club domestic league appearances and goals

Milija Anthony Aleksic (14 April 1951 – 17 October 2012) was an English professional footballer who played as a goalkeeper, making 138 appearances in the Football League.

Released by Port Vale in 1969, he played for Eastwood before lifting the FA Trophy with Stafford Rangers in 1972. The next year he returned to the Football League with Plymouth Argyle before he was signed by Luton Town in December 1976, following loan spells with Oxford United and Ipswich Town. Three years later, he moved on to Tottenham Hotspur and played in the club's FA Cup victory in 1981. In 1982, he was loaned back to Luton Town before he went back into non-League football with Barnet. He later migrated to South Africa and played for Wits University.

== Career ==
A goalkeeper born to a Yugoslav father, he grew up in a small Serbian community in Chesterton, Staffordshire; he was a childhood friend of future England international Mike Pejic. His career started with Gordon Lee's Port Vale. He played two FA Cup games for the "Valiants" as a 17-year-old in the 1968–69 season, both First round games with Shrewsbury Town in which he conceded one goal in both the original game and the replay at Vale Park. An emergency replacement for the injured Stuart Sharratt, he was so keen that he used to iron his bootlaces before playing. He was given a free transfer in May 1969 and moved into non-League football with Eastwood, and then Stafford Rangers. With Rangers he was a member of the 1972 FA Trophy winning team, following a 3–0 win over Barnet at Wembley Stadium.

In 1973, he returned to the Football League, signing for Tony Waiters's Plymouth Argyle. He played against Pelé in a friendly against Santos in March 1973, which Plymouth won 3–2. The "Pilgrims" posted a 17th-place finish in the Third Division in 1973–74, before winning promotion with a second-place finish in 1974–75 (they finished one point behind champions Blackburn Rovers). They then held their own in the Second Division, finishing in 16th place in 1975–76. In August 1976, he played two games on loan at Oxford United; both games were League Cup clashes with Cambridge United. He was then loaned out to Ipswich Town. Aleksic left Home Park permanently when he was moved on to league rivals Luton Town in November 1976, who were managed by Harry Haslam. The "Hatters" finished sixth in 1976–77, four points behind promoted Nottingham Forest. Luton then dropped to 13th in 1977–78 under new boss David Pleat, and then finished 18th in 1978–79. He played 77 league games in his three years at Kenilworth Road.

Aleksic was signed by First Division side Tottenham Hotspur in December 1978 for a fee of £100,000. The club posted a 14th-place finish in the 1979–80 season under the stewardship of Keith Burkinshaw. He faced competition between the sticks from Barry Daines and Mark Kendall. In one tie against Manchester United, notorious 'hard man' Joe Jordan broke his jaw in what was officially described as an 'accidental collision'. The injury left midfielder Glenn Hoddle to take Aleksic's place in goal for the rest of the match; despite this setback, Hoddle was untroubled in goal, and Spurs won 1–0 with Osvaldo Ardiles scoring the winning goal. The White Hart Lane club made a top ten finish in 1980–81, and also lifted the FA Cup with a 3–2 victory over Manchester City at Wembley. Aleksic featured in both the original tie and the replay, which was won with a brace from Ricardo Villa and a scruffy goal from Garth Crooks. However, he soon lost his first-team place to Ray Clemence, and was on the bench for the 1981 FA Charity Shield draw with Aston Villa. Spurs finished fourth in 1981–82. Despite being an FA Cup-winning goalkeeper just one year previously, he dropped back into non-League football with Barry Fry's Alliance Premier League side Barnet in 1982, following a brief loan spell at former club Luton Town. He later emigrated to South Africa and played for Wits University before taking up employment at the Golfer's Club in Johannesburg.

== Career statistics ==
Appearances and goals by club, season and competition
Club	Season	League			FA Cup		Other		Total	
Club	Season	Division	Apps	Goals	Apps	Goals	Apps	Goals	Apps	Goals
Port Vale	1968–69	Fourth Division	0	0	2	0	0	0	2	0
Plymouth Argyle	1973–74	Third Division	3	0	0	0	0	0	3	0
Plymouth Argyle	1974–75	Third Division	0	0	0	0	0	0	0	0
Plymouth Argyle	1975–76	Second Division	29	0	2	0	3	0	34	0
Plymouth Argyle	Total		32	0	2	0	3	0	37	0
Oxford United (loan)	1976–77	Third Division	0	0	0	0	0	0	0	0
Ipswich Town (loan)	1976–77	First Division	0	0	0	0	0	0	0	0
Luton Town	1976–77	Second Division	25	0	2	0	0	0	27	0
Luton Town	1977–78	Second Division	38	0	2	0	4	0	44	0
Luton Town	1978–79	Second Division	14	0	0	0	3	0	17	0
Luton Town	Total		77	0	4	0	7	0	88	0
Tottenham Hotspur	1978–79	First Division	5	0	1	0	0	0	6	0
Tottenham Hotspur	1979–80	First Division	8	0	2	0	0	0	10	0
Tottenham Hotspur	1980–81	First Division	10	0	4	0	0	0	14	0
Tottenham Hotspur	1981–82	First Division	2	0	0	0	0	0	2	0
Tottenham Hotspur	Total		25	0	7	0	0	0	32	0
Luton Town (loan)	1981–82	Second Division	4	0	0	0	0	0	4	0
Career total			138	0	15	0	10	0	163	0

== Honours ==
Stafford Rangers

- FA Trophy: 1971–72

Plymouth Argyle

- Football League Third Division second-place promotion: 1974–75

Tottenham Hotspur

- FA Cup: 1980–81
- FA Charity Shield: 1981 (shared)
