= John Lacey =

John Lacey is the name of:

- John Lacey (artist), American woodcarver
- John Lacey (general) (1755–1814), American military officer during the American Revolutionary War
- John Lacey (rugby union) (born 1973), Irish rugby union player and referee
- John F. Lacey (1841–1913), American politician
- John Hubert Lacey (born 1944), British psychiatrist
- John W. Lacey (1848–1936), Chief Justice of Wyoming

== See also ==
- John Lacy (disambiguation)
