= Greenwich Village Chatter =

Greenwich Village Chatter was a monthly little magazine founded in 1945 by editor Robert A. Van Riper and published by Greenwich Village Publications at 450 Avenue of the Americas. The magazine featured local interest stories and short fiction. The cover price was 15¢. It included profiles of notable artists, such as wood carver John Lacey, who specialized in carving and painting images of birds, and flamenco dancer Carmen Amaya in the October 1946 issue. It ceased publication with the June–July 1947 issue.

Fred Lamson published a similar magazine called Village Chatter and Greenwich Village Review in 1934–35.
