= John Lacy =

John Lacy may refer to:

- John Lacy (playwright) (c. 1615?–1681), an English actor and playwright
- John Lacy (footballer) (born 1951), an English footballer

== See also ==
- John Lacey (disambiguation)
