= Sammy Lee (footballer) =

English footballer (born 1959)

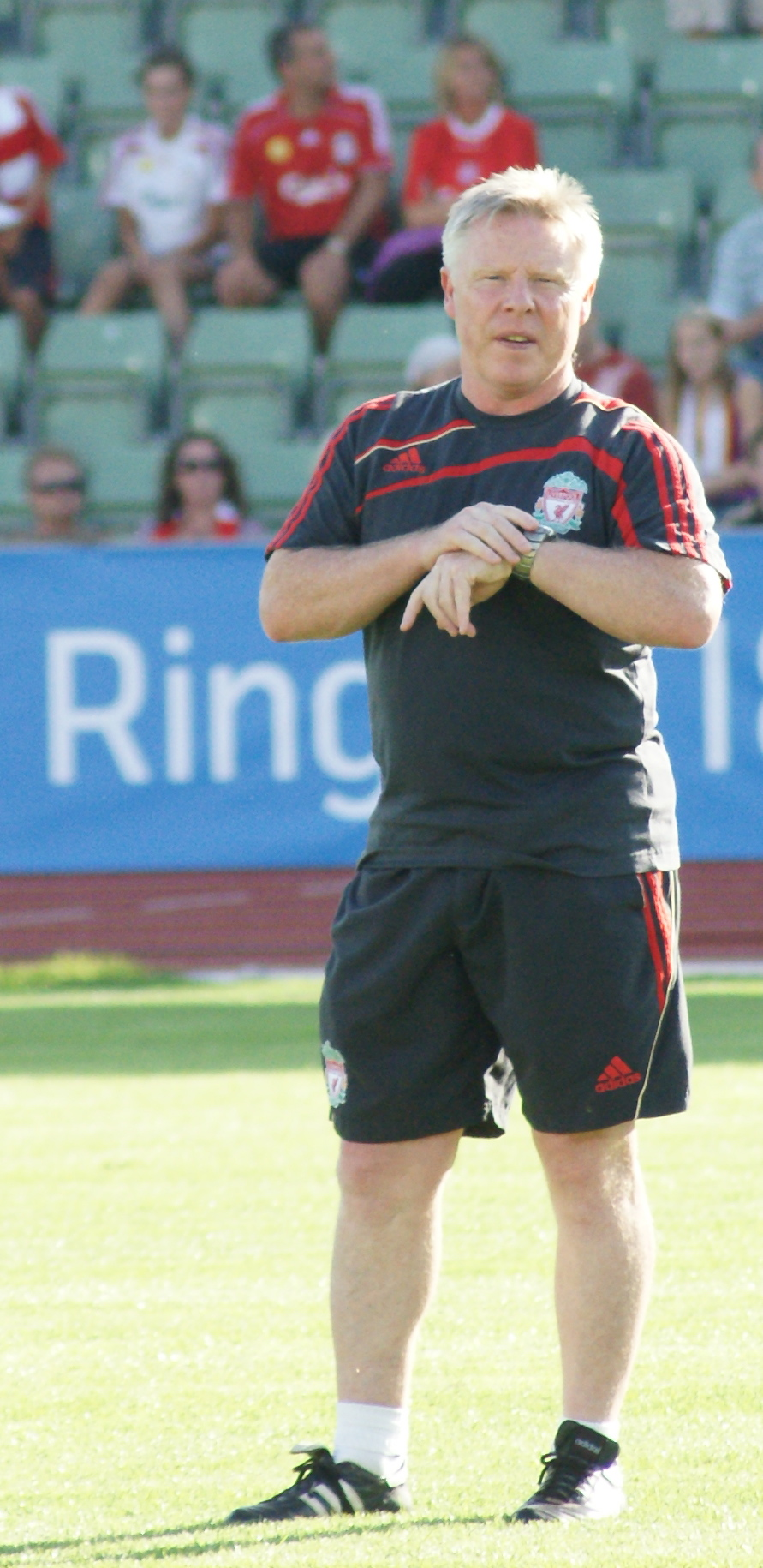
- Lee with Liverpool in 2009

Personal information
- Full name: Samuel Lee
- Date of birth: 7 February 1959 (age 67)
- Place of birth: Liverpool, England
- Height: 5 ft 7 in (1.70 m)
- Position: Midfielder

Youth career
- 1975–1976: Liverpool

Senior career*
Years	Team	Apps	(Gls)
1976–1986	Liverpool	197	(13)
1986–1987	Queens Park Rangers	30	(0)
1987–1990	Osasuna	28	(0)
1989–1990	→ Southampton (loan)	2	(0)
1990–1991	Bolton Wanderers	4	(0)
Total		261	(13)

International career
1977	England Youth	7	(0)
1981–1982	England U21	6	(0)
1982–1984	England	14	(2)

Managerial career
- 2007: Bolton Wanderers
- 2008: Liverpool (caretaker)
- 2012: Bolton Wanderers (caretaker)
- * Club domestic league appearances and goals

Samuel Lee (born 7 February 1959) is an English professional football coach and former footballer.

Lee played most of his career for hometown club Liverpool during the 1970s and 1980s as a midfielder, and also represented England fourteen times. He also had playing spells at Queens Park Rangers, Osasuna, Southampton, and Bolton Wanderers.

After retiring as a player, Lee joined the coaching staff at Liverpool before joining Sven-Göran Eriksson's England set-up in 2001. He became assistant manager to Sam Allardyce at Bolton Wanderers in 2005, and their manager in 2007. He was then appointed assistant manager to Rafael Benítez at Liverpool in 2008 before returning to Bolton Wanderers in 2012 as head of academy coaching and development. Lee was appointed assistant coach at Southampton under Ronald Koeman in 2014 before joining Sam Allardyce's England staff two years later. Lee followed Allardyce to Crystal Palace and Everton in 2017. Lee re-joined Allardyce again at West Brom in December 2020 as an assistant.

== Playing career ==
Born in Liverpool, Lee rose through the ranks at Liverpool after joining on an apprenticeship in September 1975, making his first team debut on 8 April 1978, as a 6th minute substitute for David Johnson. Leicester City at Anfield were the opponents, as Lee managed to find the net in the 56th minute of the 3–2 victory. A year earlier, he had been put in the squad for a European Cup semi-final against FC Zürich and, although he didn't play, manager Bob Paisley said he would have had no qualms about using him if required.

Lee became a regular from 1980 onwards and, although small in stature, he established a reputation as a sharp-passing and strong-running midfield player who could also hit a decent shot. In the 1981 League Cup final, Lee was at the centre of a controversial incident which left opponents West Ham United feeling slightly cheated. Lee had ventured forwards in an attack and ended up flat out on the turf following a challenge. The West Ham defence pushed out of their area to leave Lee in an offside position but when Liverpool full back Alan Kennedy scored with a follow-up shot, the goal stood. West Ham did equalise but Liverpool won the replay with Lee in the side.

In that year's European Cup semi-final against Bayern Munich, Lee was unusually asked to do a man-marking job on Paul Breitner, the strong and skilful West German international. Lee did the marking job to perfection and Liverpool went through to the final against Real Madrid, which they won 1–0 with Lee again in the side.

Lee got his first League title medal in 1982 and also helped Liverpool retain the League Cup; the same applied in 1983 and 1984, the latter of which was also the year of their fourth European Cup triumph – Lee played in every game en route to the final and scored a clinching goal in the first leg of the semi-final at Anfield against Dinamo București.

Bobby Robson gave Lee the first of his 14 England caps during this period, where he again scored on his debut in the 3–0 1984 UEFA European Championship qualifier victory over Greece, on 17 November 1982.

Injuries took their toll in 1985 and Lee struggled to regain his previous form. With Jan Mølby in the side, there was no longer a place for him at Liverpool. He left during August 1986, joining Queens Park Rangers. Spells at CA Osasuna (where he reunited with former Liverpool teammate Michael Robinson), Southampton and Bolton Wanderers followed before he retired from playing.

== Coaching career ==
Lee's former Liverpool captain, Graeme Souness, invited Lee to join his Anfield coaching staff in 1993. He did so with relish and gained respect to the extent that both Roy Evans and Gérard Houllier kept him on the payroll after Souness left, gaining promotion from reserve team coach to the first team, under Houllier.

Lee became a part-time coach under Sven-Göran Eriksson with England in 2001, eventually leaving Liverpool to go full-time with the national set-up in July 2004.

=== Bolton Wanderers ===
Lee went to Bolton Wanderers in September 2005, as assistant to Sam Allardyce. He was offered the role of manager of the England U21s in July 2006, but turned the move down and also left the senior England set-up. He was given the affectionate nickname of "Little Sam" in contrast to Allardyce who was known as "Big Sam" by the Bolton Fans.

Allardyce left Bolton in April 2007 and Lee was confirmed as his replacement shortly afterwards. After only winning one league game from eleven matches, he was sacked in October 2007, becoming the second Premier League manager to be sacked in that season. He was known for regularly citing the 'positives' in post-match interviews despite numerous defeats. He was linked with a return to Liverpool by becoming Rafael Benítez's assistant after the pair watched a Liverpool reserve match together. He was also linked to the assistant manager position at Leeds United under Gary McAllister. He became the firm favourite to become assistant coach to Rafa Benitez following Alex Miller's departure from Liverpool and officially returned to the club when appointed on 16 May 2008.

In November 2008, upon his return to the Reebok Stadium for the first time since his departure, Lee stated that he bore no animosity towards the hierarchy at Bolton or their supporters, the Wanderers crowd responded by giving him a round of applause in appreciation of his spells as player and assistant manager.

=== Liverpool ===
On 16 May 2008, Lee took up the role of assistant manager to Rafael Benítez after signing a two-year contract. On 21 December 2008, he took charge of Liverpool for the first time in a 1–1 draw with Arsenal due to Rafael Benítez being ill with kidney stones.

On 26 August 2009, Lee was sent off by referee Phil Dowd in a 2–1 defeat against Tottenham Hotspur, and was charged with improper conduct by the Football Association on 19 August 2009. He left Liverpool in June 2011 by mutual consent having remained at the club for the duration of Roy Hodgson’s tenure and the return of Kenny Dalglish.

=== Return to Bolton ===
On 14 February 2012, Lee returned to Bolton for a third time, being appointed as the Head of Academy Coaching. His new role saw him take a senior role working alongside fellow ex-Wanderers players and Academy coaches Jimmy Phillips, Tony Kelly, David Lee, Nicky Spooner and Gavin McCann.

On 9 October 2012, after Owen Coyle's sacking, Lee and Jimmy Phillips were named joint-caretaker managers. However, Phillips took charge of first team affairs, with Lee joining up with Julian Darby to assist him.

=== Southampton ===
On 27 June 2014, Lee agreed to leave Bolton to join Brighton & Hove Albion as assistant manager to Sami Hyypia, with both knowing each other from their time together at Liverpool. However, on 29 June it was announced that he would instead take a coaching position with Southampton, alongside newly appointed manager Ronald Koeman. Lee left Southampton at the end of June 2016, following Koeman's departure and the appointment of Claude Puel as manager.

=== England ===
On 25 July 2016, it was announced that Lee had rejoined Sam Allardyce as a member of England's coaching staff. He left the role in December 2016, following the appointment of Gareth Southgate as manager.

=== Crystal Palace ===
After Sam Allardyce was appointed Crystal Palace manager, Lee was appointed his assistant on 10 January 2017.

After the departure of Allardyce from Selhurst Park at the end of the 2016–17 season, Lee continued as assistant manager under the club's new manager, Frank de Boer. In September 2017, after de Boer's departure, Lee also left the club.

=== Everton ===
On 1 December 2017, Lee was appointed assistant manager at Everton following the appointment of Sam Allardyce as manager the previous day. He departed Everton on 16 May 2018 following the sacking of Allardyce.

=== West Bromwich Albion ===
On 16 December 2020, Lee was appointed assistant head coach to Sam Allardyce after his appointment as manager at West Bromwich Albion.

== Career statistics ==
=== Club ===
Appearances and goals by club, season and competition
Club	Season	League			National cup (Note: Appearances in FA Cup and Copa del Rey)		League Cup		Europe		Other		Total	
Club	Season	Division	Apps	Goals	Apps	Goals	Apps	Goals	Apps	Goals	Apps	Goals	Apps	Goals
Liverpool	1976–77	First Division	0	0	0	0	0	0	0	0	0	0	0	0
Liverpool	1977–78	First Division	2	1	0	0	0	0	0	0	0	0	2	1
Liverpool	1978–79	First Division	2	0	0	0	0	0	0	0	–		2	0
Liverpool	1979–80	First Division	7	0	4	0	0	0	0	0	0	0	11	0
Liverpool	1980–81	First Division	37	4	2	0	7	2	9 (Note: Appearances in European Cup)	2	0	0	55	8
Liverpool	1981–82	First Division	35	3	2	0	6	0	5	1	1 (Note: Appearance in Intercontinental Cup)	0	49	4
Liverpool	1982–83	First Division	40	3	3	0	8	0	6	0	1 (Note: Appearances in FA Charity Shield)	0	58	3
Liverpool	1983–84	First Division	42	2	2	0	13	0	9	1	1	0	67	3
Liverpool	1984–85	First Division	17	0	1	0	2	0	4	0	1	0	25	0
Liverpool	1985–86	First Division	15	0	3	0	3	0	–		5 (Note: Appearances in Football League Super Cup)	0	26	0
Liverpool	Total		197	13	17	0	39	2	33	4	9	0	295	19
Queens Park Rangers	1986–87	First Division	30	0					–		–		30	0
Osasuna	1987–88	La Liga	22	0	7	0	–		–		–		29	0
Osasuna	1988–89	La Liga	6	0	0	0	–		–		–		6	0
Osasuna	1989–90	La Liga	0	0	0	0	–		–		–		0	0
Osasuna	Total		28	0	7	0	0	0	0	0	0	0	35	0
Southampton (loan)	1989–90	First Division	2	0	1	0	0	0	–		–		3	0
Bolton Wanderers	1990–91	Third Division	4	0					–				4	0
Career total			261	13	25	0	39	2	33	4	9	0	367	0

=== International ===
Appearances and goals by national team and year
National team	Year	Apps	Goals
England	1982	2	1
England	1983	8	1
England	1984	4	0
Total		14	2

Scores and results list England's goal tally first, score column indicates score after each Lee goal.

List of international goals scored by Sammy Lee
No.	Date	Venue	Cap	Opponent	Score	Result	Competition	Ref.
1	17 November 1982	Kaftanzoglio Stadium, Thessaloniki, Greece	1	Greece	3–0	3–0	UEFA Euro 1984 qualifying	
2	12 October 1983	Népstadion, Budapest, Hungary	9	Hungary	2–0	3–0	UEFA Euro 1984 qualifying	

== Managerial statistics ==
As of 17 October 2007

Managerial record by team and tenure
Team	From	To	Record				
Team	From	To	P	W	D	L	Win %
Bolton Wanderers	30 April 2007	17 October 2007	14	3	4	7	21.4
Total			14	3	4	7	21.4

== Honours ==
Liverpool

- Football League First Division: 1979–80, 1981–82, 1982–83, 1983–84, 1985–86
- Football League Cup: 1980–81, 1981–82, 1982–83, 1983–84
- FA Charity Shield: 1979, 1980, 1982, 1986 (shared)
- European Cup: 1980–81, 1983–84

England Under 21

- UEFA European Under-21 Championship: 1982
