= 1981 FA Charity Shield =

Aston Villa	Tottenham Hotspur
2	2
- Date: 22 August 1981
- Venue: Wembley Stadium, London
- Referee: Alf Grey (Great Yarmouth)
- Attendance: 92,500

The 1981 FA Charity Shield was the 59th FA Charity Shield, an annual football match played between the winners of the previous season's Football League and FA Cup competitions. The match was played on 22 August 1981 at Wembley Stadium and played between 1980–81 Football League champions Aston Villa and FA Cup winners Tottenham Hotspur. The match ended in a 2–2 draw and the sides shared the trophy for six months each.

Peter Withe scored twice for Villa, and Mark Falco twice for Tottenham, in front of a 92,500-strong crowd.

== Match details ==
22 August 1981
15:00

Aston Villa	2–2	Tottenham Hotspur
Withe 31', 53'		Falco 44', 49'

Wembley Stadium, London
Attendance: 92,500

Aston Villa	Tottenham Hotspur

GK	1	(England) Jimmy Rimmer
DF	2	(England) Kenny Swain
DF	3	(England) Colin Gibson
DF	4	(Scotland) Allan Evans
DF	5	(Scotland) Ken McNaught
MF	6	(England) Dennis Mortimer (c) (substituted off)
MF	7	(Scotland) Des Bremner
FW	8	(England) David Geddis
FW	9	(England) Peter Withe
MF	10	(England) Gordon Cowans
MF	11	(England) Tony Morley
Substitutes:
DF	12	(England) Gary Williams
MF	13	(Scotland) Andy Blair	Substituted on
MF	14	(England) Robert Hopkins
DF	15	(England) Brendon Ormsby
GK	16	(England) Nigel Spink
Manager:
(England) Ron Saunders

GK	1	(England) Ray Clemence
DF	2	(Republic of Ireland) Chris Hughton
DF	3	(England) Paul Miller
DF	4	(England) Graham Roberts
MF	5	(Argentina) Ricky Villa
DF	6	(England) Steve Perryman (c)
MF	7	(Argentina) Ossie Ardiles
FW	8	(Scotland) Steve Archibald
MF	9	(Republic of Ireland) Tony Galvin
MF	10	(England) Glenn Hoddle
FW	11	(England) Mark Falco
Substitutes:
DF	12	(Scotland) Gordon Smith
GK	13	(England) Milija Aleksic
DF	14	(Wales) Paul Price
MF	15	(England) Garry Brooke
FW	16	(England) Chris Jones
Manager:
(England) Keith Burkinshaw

== See also ==
- 1980–81 Football League
- 1980–81 FA Cup
