= Pat Corbett =

English footballer

Personal information
- Full name: Patrick Avalon Corbett
- Date of birth: 12 February 1963
- Place of birth: Hackney, England
- Position: Central defender

Senior career*
Years	Team	Apps	(Gls)
1980–1983	Tottenham Hotspur	5	(1)
1983–1985	Orient	77	(2)
1986–1990	Kuopion Elo	101	(9)
1991	MYPA	18	(0)

International career
1980–1981	England Youth	5	(0)
- * Club domestic league appearances and goals

Patrick Avalon Corbett (born 12 February 1963) is an English former professional footballer who played for Tottenham Hotspur, Orient and represented England at youth level.

== Playing career ==
Corbett joined Tottenham Hotspur as an apprentice and signed professional forms in October, 1980. The central defender made his senior debut against Southampton at The Dell on 31 October 1981–a match in which he scored the winning goal. Corbett featured in five matches and scored the one goal between 1981–1983 for the Spurs. He transferred to Orient in August, 1983 where he went on to make 77 appearances and netting two goals.

In 1986 Corbett moved to Finland where he played five seasons for Kuopion Elo and one season with MYPA.
