= Chris Jones (footballer, born 1956) =

English footballer

Personal information
- Full name: Christopher Harry Jones
- Date of birth: 18 April 1956 (age 70)
- Place of birth: Jersey, Channel Islands
- Height: 5 ft 11 in (1.80 m)
- Position: Forward

Senior career*
Years	Team	Apps	(Gls)
1973–1982	Tottenham Hotspur	164	(37)
1982	Manchester City	3	(0)
1982–1983	Crystal Palace	18	(3)
1983–1984	Charlton Athletic	23	(2)
1984–1986	Leyton Orient	107	(19)

International career
1978	England U21	1	(0)
- * Club domestic league appearances and goals

Christopher Harry Jones (born 18 April 1956) is a former professional footballer who played for Tottenham Hotspur, Manchester City, Crystal Palace, Charlton Athletic, Leyton Orient and represented the England Under 21 national team on one occasion.

== Football career ==
Jones joined Tottenham Hotspur as an apprentice in May 1973. The forward played a total of 185 matches, including 19 substitute appearances and scored 42 goals in all competitions. Jones has the distinction of being a member of the 1977 relegated and the 1978 promoted teams during his career at the club. Jones made his only England U21 appearance in the Semi-Final of the European Championships against Yugoslavia in 1979. He was an unused substitute in the Charity Shield final in 1981 against Aston Villa. He joined Manchester City in September 1982 in a £110.000 transfer deal. Jones featured in just three games before leaving Maine Road to join Crystal Palace in November of the same year. Jones played in 18 matches and scored three times for Palace. He transferred to Charlton Athletic in September 1983 where he appeared on 23 occasions plus six as a substitute, scoring twice. Jones ended his senior career at Leyton Orient where he played in 107 matches, including one as a substitute, scoring 19 goals between September 1984–86.

== Post-football career ==
Jones retired from Leyton Orient in 1988, mainly due to a long-standing ankle injury. After retirement, he returned to Jersey with his family, where he established the Chris Jones Soccer School, teaching football to Jersey's youth.

== Honours ==
Tottenham Hotspur

FA Charity Shield: 1981 (shared)
