= David Hodgson (footballer) =

English footballer and manager (born 1960)

Personal information
- Full name: David James Hodgson
- Date of birth: 6 August 1960 (age 66)
- Place of birth: Gateshead, England
- Height: 5 ft 9 in (1.75 m)
- Position: Striker

Senior career*
Years	Team	Apps	(Gls)
1978–1982	Middlesbrough	125	(16)
1982–1984	Liverpool	48	(4)
1984–1986	Sunderland	40	(5)
1986–1987	Norwich City	6	(1)
1987	→ Middlesbrough (loan)	2	(0)
1987–1988	Xerez	14	(0)
1988–1989	Sheffield Wednesday	11	(1)
1989–1990	Mazda	?	(?)
1990–1992	Metz	38	(0)
1992	Swansea City	3	(0)
Total		287	(27)

International career
1980–1982	England U21	7	(2)

Managerial career
- 1995: Darlington
- 1996–2000: Darlington
- 2003–2006: Darlington
- * Club domestic league appearances and goals

David James Hodgson (born 6 August 1960) is an English former footballer who played for Middlesbrough, Liverpool, Norwich City, Sunderland, Swansea and Sheffield Wednesday, as well as top division clubs FC Metz in France, Mazda in Japan, and Jerez Club Deportivo in Spain. During his two-year spell at Liverpool he helped them win the First Division twice. He made 49 appearances in total between 1982 and 1984.

He was a member of the 1982 UEFA European Under-21 Championship-winning England under-21 team.

He was director of sport at bhpsport, a division of Blackett Hart & Pratt LLP. He left his post as Darlington manager in October 2006, where he was in his third spell in charge of the team, managing over 400 games. In 2004, he wrote a book titled Three Times A Quaker: My World of Football and Passion for Darlington F.C. published by Speakeasy Publishing. Voted in top 25 North East Managers of all time.

== Honours ==
=== As a player ===
Liverpool

- First Division: 1982–83, 1983–84
- FA Charity Shield: 1982
- European Cup: 1983–84

Sunderland

- Football League Cup runner-up: 1984–85

England U21

- UEFA Under-21 Championship: 1982

== Managerial statistics ==
Team	From	To	Record				
Team	From	To	G	W	L	D	Win %
Darlington	August 1995	December 1995	21	7	5	9	33.3
Darlington	August 1996	August 2000	215	76	81	58	35.3
Darlington	October 2003	September 2006	144	51	51	42	35.4
