= John Chiedozie =

Nigerian footballer (born 1960)

Personal information
- Full name: John Okechukwu Chiedozie
- Date of birth: 18 April 1960 (age 66)
- Place of birth: Owerri, Nigeria
- Height: 5 ft 7 in (1.70 m)
- Position: Winger

Senior career*
| Years | Team | Apps | (Gls) |
| 1977–1981 | Orient | 145 | (20) |
| 1981–1984 | Notts County | 111 | (15) |
| 1984–1988 | Tottenham Hotspur | 53 | (12) |
| 1988–1990 | Derby County | 2 | (0) |
| 1990 | Notts County | 1 | (0) |
| 1990 | Chesterfield | 7 | (0) |
| 1992 | Bashley | | |

International career
| 1981–? | Nigeria | 9 | (2) |
- * Club domestic league appearances and goals

John Okechukwu Chiedozie // (born 18 April 1960) is a former professional football player who played for Orient, Notts County, Tottenham Hotspur, Derby County and Chesterfield and represented Nigeria at international level on nine occasions.

== Football career ==
Chiedozie joined Orient as an apprentice in April 1977 where he went on to make 145 appearances scoring 20 goals. In August 1981 he joined Notts County for the first time in a £600,000 transfer deal. Chiedozie featured in 111 matches scoring on 15 occasions.

Tottenham paid £375,000 for his services in August 1984. Chiedozie scored on his debut in a 4–1 away win at Goodison Park versus Everton. In his career at the club, much of it disrupted through injury, he played in 75 matches, including 11 as substitute, scoring 14 goals in all competitions.

Derby County was his next club, which he joined on a free transfer in August 1988, where he completed only two games in his time at the Baseball Ground. A second spell at Notts County began in January 1990, which resulted in just one substitute appearance, before joining Chesterfield in March 1990 where he featured in seven matches, including five as sub. Chiedozie ended his career at the Hampshire non-league side Bashley, and retired from competitive football in 1992.

== Honours ==
In 2002, he was honoured with the title of Officer of the Order of Niger by President of Nigeria, Olusegun Obasanjo for his contribution to Nigerian football.

== After football ==
Today, Chiedozie runs a children's soft play equipment business in the New Forest area of Hampshire. He currently plays golf at Highcliffe Castle Golf Club and has an active handicap of 7 (bandit).

His son Jordan, also a winger, was with the AFC Bournemouth academy.
