= Bob Wardle =

English footballer

Personal information
- Full name: Robert Ian Wardle
- Date of birth: 5 March 1955 (age 71)
- Place of birth: Halifax, England
- Position: Goalkeeper

Youth career
- Bristol City

Senior career*
Years	Team	Apps	(Gls)
1972–1974	Bristol City	0	(0)
1974–1982	Shrewsbury Town	131	(0)
1982–1985	Liverpool	0	(0)
1983–1984	→ Wrexham (loan)	13	(0)
1984	→ Tranmere Rovers (loan)		
- * Club domestic league appearances and goals

Robert Ian Wardle (born 5 March 1955) is an English former footballer who played as a goalkeeper.

== Career ==
Wardle started his career at Bristol City, however he did not play a professional game before moving to Shrewsbury Town.

At Shrewsbury, he would make 131 appearances in his eight years there, earning him a move to Liverpool, with Steve Ogrizovic going to Shrewbury in exchange.

However, he did not make a first team appearance at Liverpool, with Bruce Grobbelaar being their first choice goalkeeper. He was loaned out to Wrexham and Tranmere Rovers before being forced to retire due to an eye injury.

A testimonial match in his honour was held at Gay Meadow on 16 December 1986 where his former clubs Liverpool and Shrewsbury played one another. Steve Nicol scored both goals in a 2–0 victory for the visitors.
