= John Lacey (artist) =

American sculptor

John L. Lacey (c.1902 – July 11, 1979 in Scottsdale, Arizona, USA) was a Greenwich Village based woodcarver known as "The Prince of Fuss and Feathers" for his representations of birds that have been displayed at the National Audubon Society.

He was raised in the Spoon River Country in Illinois where his father taught him to hunt quail, grouse, and duck. Employed in the insurance business, he began carving and painting duck decoys as a hobby. Eventually, he gave up his position as an actuary and went into sculpting full-time.

In order to sculpt a bird, he worked from photographs as well as specimens he caught (along with his dog, Ned), killed, and taxidermed himself. He then would carved the gross shape from a bandsaw and detail with a pocket knife. He cited the secret of his success as a "deep feeling" for birds and his "careful observation of their fascinating behavior." "I like what nature did to birds, and I don't believe I can improve on it," he told reporter Diane Barkley Hutton in 1946.

In 1951, he published The Audubon Book of Bird Carving as told to Tom Moore McBride (New York: McGraw-Hill).
