= Graham Roberts =

English footballer and manager

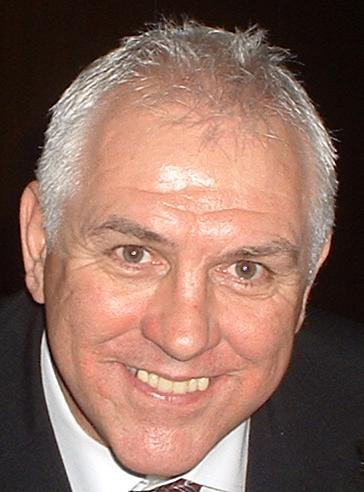

Personal information
- Full name: Graham Paul Roberts
- Date of birth: 3 July 1959 (age 67)
- Place of birth: Southampton, England
- Height: 5 ft 10 in (1.78 m)
- Position: Defender

Youth career
- 1973–1977: Southampton
- 1977–1978: Portsmouth

Senior career*
| Years | Team | Apps | (Gls) |
| 1978–1979 | Dorchester Town | 0 | (0) |
| 1979–1980 | Weymouth | 29 | (6) |
| 1980–1986 | Tottenham Hotspur | 209 | (23) |
| 1986–1988 | Rangers | 55 | (3) |
| 1988–1990 | Chelsea | 70 | (18) |
| 1990–1992 | West Bromwich Albion | 39 | (6) |
| 1994–1995 | Stevenage Borough | 11 | (1) |
| 1995–1998 | Yeovil Town | 6 | (1) |
| 1998 | Chesham United | | |
| 1998–1999 | Slough Town | 10 | (0) |
| Total | | 429 | (58) |

International career
| 1984 | England B | 1 | (0) |
| 1983–1984 | England | 6 | (0) |

Managerial career
- 1992–1994: Enfield
- 1995–1998: Yeovil Town
- 1998–1999: Chesham United
- 2000–2001: Hertford Town
- 2001: Boreham Wood
- 2001–2003: Carshalton Athletic
- 2004: Braintree Town
- 2005–2006: Clyde
- 2010: Pakistan (coaching consultant)
- 2011–2012: Nepal
- * Club domestic league appearances and goals

Graham Paul Roberts (born 3 July 1959) is an English retired footballer and manager who played as a defender for numerous clubs including Tottenham Hotspur (where he won the FA Cup and the UEFA Cup), Rangers (where he won the Scottish League and Scottish League Cup), Chelsea (where he won the Second Division) and West Bromwich Albion. He was also capped six times by England. He subsequently served as the head coach of the Pakistan national team and Nepal national team.

== Playing career ==
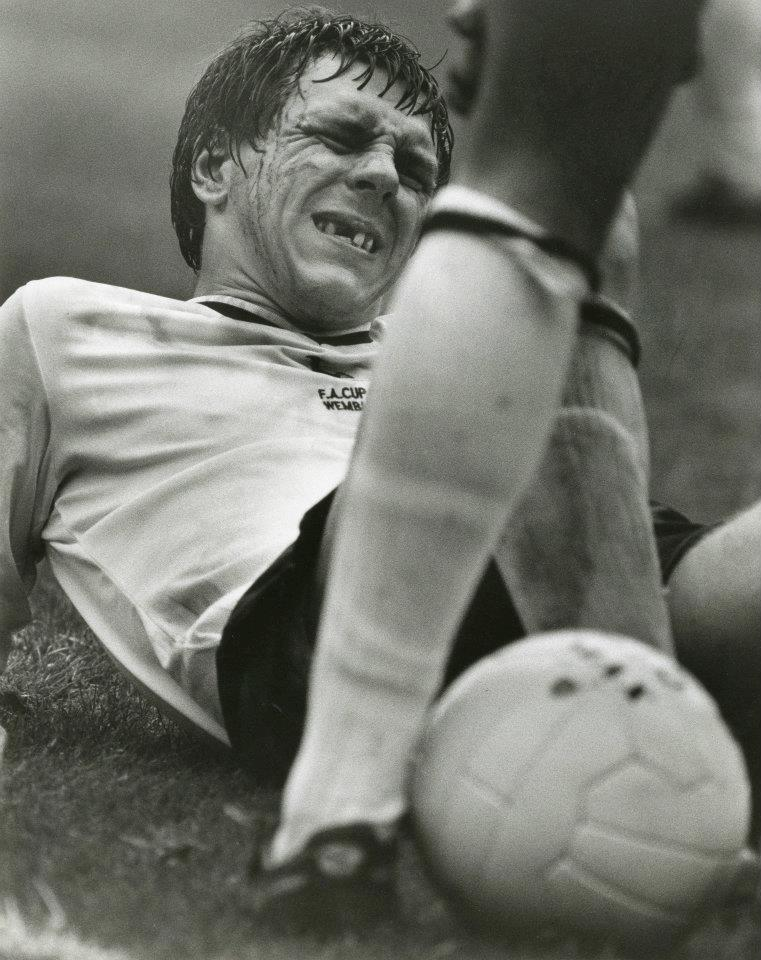
English FA cup final, 1981. Here is Tottenham's Graham Roberts who lost three teeth, but who nonetheless refused to leave the field.

=== Early career ===
Roberts was born in Southampton, and joined his local club, Southampton F.C, as an associate schoolboy in October 1973, but failed to make the grade and was released, joining Portsmouth in March 1977. He was sold to Dorchester Town where he impressed before joining local rivals Weymouth. From there he was sold to Tottenham Hotspur in May 1980 for £35,000.

=== Tottenham Hotspur ===
Roberts was a member of the successful Tottenham Hotspur side of the early 1980s, winning the FA Cup in 1981 and 1982. With Steve Perryman suspended, Roberts captained the side as Tottenham won the 1984 UEFA Cup, scoring in the second leg of the final against Anderlecht.

=== Rangers ===
He moved to Rangers in 1986 for £450,000 and won the Scottish Premier Division in his first season and the Scottish League Cup a year later. Whilst at Rangers he was involved in a controversial Old Firm derby at Ibrox Park on 17 October 1987. During a very bad-tempered match three players were sent off and in the aftermath Roberts, his team-mates Terry Butcher and Chris Woods and Celtic player Frank McAvennie were all charged with conduct likely to provoke a breach of the peace. McAvennie was found not guilty, while Roberts was found not proven, although Butcher and Woods were both convicted and fined. During the match Roberts, who had taken over as goalkeeper after Woods was sent off, was involved in a second controversy when he "conducted" Rangers supporters in a rendition of "The Billy Boys", although Roberts would subsequently claim that he did not realise they were singing that song, a traditional Ulster loyalist anthem, when he made the gesture.

=== Chelsea ===
He joined Chelsea in August 1988 for £475,000 and helped the side emphatically win the Second Division championship in 1988–89.

=== West Bromwich Albion ===
He later moved to West Bromwich Albion, where he played out the remainder of his professional career.

=== International career ===
Roberts won six caps for England.

== Coaching career ==
Roberts was manager of Enfield from 1992 until 1994, and went on to manage Yeovil Town between 1995 and 1998. He was later manager of Chesham United during the 1998–99 season. He was appointed manager to Hertford Town in 2000, but left in February 2001 when he became manager of Isthmian League club Boreham Wood. Despite leading the club to Division One title, he resigned from the post in July. He was then appointed manager of Carshalton Athletic, who he guided to the Isthmian League Division One South title in 2002–03 before leaving the club. Roberts briefly managed Braintree Town at the end of the 2003–04 season.

In June 2005, Roberts was appointed manager of Clyde. He only had three players under contract, and held open trials in an attempt to get new players. Roberts gave the supporters their greatest day in years, when his Clyde side defeated Celtic in the Scottish Cup in January 2006. Earlier in the season, Clyde took Rangers to extra time at Ibrox Stadium in the Scottish League Cup. Roberts was sacked by Clyde in August 2006 after allegations he made racist remarks. An employment tribunal found that the allegations were "either highly exaggerated or possibly not true" and awarded Roberts £32,000 compensation for unfair dismissal.

In September 2010, he was hired as a consultant to the Pakistan national football team to assist the coaching staff for the 2010 Asian Games. Roberts was appointed as a coaching consultant under head coach Akhtar Mohiuddin. Eventually Roberts parted ways and Akhtar was fired by the Pakistan Football Federation.

He then joined the Nepal national football team in January 2011. In March 2012, he stepped down as coach after a 3–0 defeat to Turkmenistan in the 2012 AFC Challenge Cup.

== Honours ==
=== As a player ===
Tottenham Hotspur

- FA Cup: 1980–81, 1981–82
- FA Charity Shield: 1981 (shared)
- UEFA Cup: 1983–84

Rangers

- Scottish Football League Premier Division: 1986–87
- Scottish League Cup: 1987–88

Chelsea

- Football League Second Division: 1988–89

Individual

- Chelsea Player of the Year: 1989
- PFA Team of the Year: 1988–89 Second Division
