= Mark Falco =

English footballer

Personal information
- Full name: Mark Peter Falco
- Date of birth: 22 October 1960 (age 66)
- Place of birth: Bethnal Green, London, England
- Height: 6 ft 0 in (1.83 m)
- Position: Striker

Youth career
- Tottenham Hotspur

Senior career*
Years	Team	Apps	(Gls)
1978–1986	Tottenham Hotspur	174	(68)
1982	→ Chelsea (loan)	3	(0)
1986–1987	Watford	33	(14)
1987	Rangers	19	(10)
1987–1991	Queens Park Rangers	87	(27)
1991–1992	Millwall	21	(4)
Total		337	(123)

International career
1978	England Youth	4	(3)

Managerial career
- 1996–1997: Worthing
- * Club domestic league appearances and goals

Mark Peter Falco (born 22 October 1960) is an English former professional footballer who played as a striker for a number of clubs, including Tottenham Hotspur, Watford, Rangers and Queens Park Rangers.

== Career ==
Falco was born in Bethnal Green, London. Having spent his early years as a prolific goalscorer for Fields United, a youth team in the London Borough of Hackney, Falco started his professional career as a junior at Tottenham Hotspur. He made his first-team debut in May 1979, scoring in a 3–1 victory at Burnden Park versus Bolton Wanderers. In his time at Spurs he played alongside strikers Steve Archibald and Garth Crooks. He had a good career at Spurs however scoring 89 goals in 236 games, including five in the short-lived 1986 Football League Super Cup where he finished second to Liverpool's Ian Rush (7 goals) in the top scorers competition. He won the 1984 UEFA Cup Final with Spurs, successfully dispatching his penalty as Spurs overcame Anderlecht in a shootout. Whilst at Spurs, he had a brief spell on loan at Chelsea over November and December 1982, making three appearances.

In 1986 Falco signed for Watford, scoring 15 goals in 30 matches, but soon moved on to join the growing English contingent at Rangers in the Scottish Premier League. In his short spell at Ibrox, Falco scored 10 goals in 19 competitive games, including a vital strike against Dinamo Kiev in the European Cup.

Falco was signed by Queens Park Rangers for £350,000 in December 1987, and made his debut against Manchester United soon afterwards. He went on to play 87 league games for QPR scoring 27 goals. He moved to Millwall in 1991. He retired through injury in 1992.

In 2009, Falco was voted as one of the top 50 greatest Spurs players of all time.

== Post-football career ==
Falco has gone into partnership with fellow ex–Spur John Pratt in a cleaning and asbestos clearing concern based in Hertfordshire. Falco also plays regularly for the Tottenham legends team, and is also part of the "Tottenham Legends" match day corporate host team at White Hart Lane.

== Personal life ==
Falco retired from the professional game due to injury in 1992. This was shortly after the birth of his two children Sarah and Peter.

== Honours ==
Tottenham Hotspur

- UEFA Cup: 1983–84
- FA Charity Shield: 1981 (shared)
