= Glenn Hoddle =

English footballer and manager (born 1957)

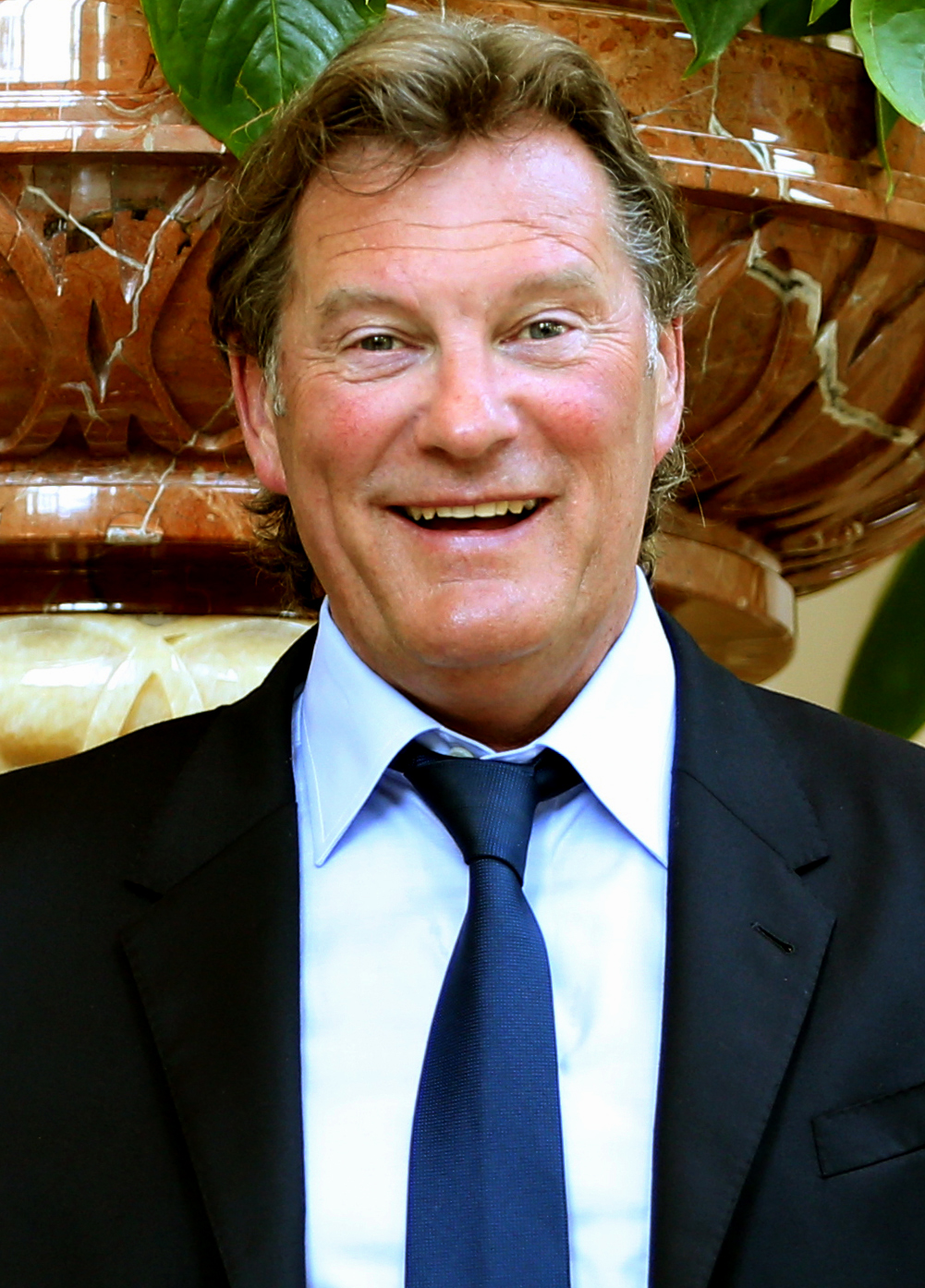
- Hoddle in 2014

Personal information
- Full name: Glenn Hoddle
- Date of birth: 27 October 1957 (age 69)
- Place of birth: Harlington, Middlesex, England
- Height: 6 ft 0 in (1.83 m)
- Position: Midfielder

Youth career
- 1970–1975: Tottenham Hotspur

Senior career*
Years	Team	Apps	(Gls)
1975–1987	Tottenham Hotspur	377	(88)
1987–1991	Monaco	69	(27)
1991–1993	Swindon Town	67	(2)
1993–1995	Chelsea	31	(1)
Total		544	(118)

International career
1975–1976	England Youth	8	(2)
1976–1980	England U21	12	(2)
1979	England B	2	(1)
1979–1988	England	53	(8)

Managerial career
- 1991–1993: Swindon Town
- 1993–1996: Chelsea
- 1996–1999: England
- 2000–2001: Southampton
- 2001–2003: Tottenham Hotspur
- 2004–2006: Wolverhampton Wanderers
Medal record
Representing England (as manager)
1997 Tournoi de France
Winner	England
- * Club domestic league appearances and goals

Glenn Hoddle (born 27 October 1957) is an English former football player and manager. He works as a television pundit and commentator for ITV Sport and TNT Sports.

Hoddle played as a midfielder for Tottenham Hotspur, Monaco, Chelsea and Swindon Town, and at international level for England. In 2007, he was inducted into the National Football Museum Hall of Fame, which cited him as one of the most gifted and creative English footballers of his generation, exhibiting "sublime balance and close control, unrivalled passing and vision and extraordinary shooting ability, both from open play and set pieces".

Hoddle has been manager of Swindon Town (earning promotion to the Premier League), Chelsea (taking them to the FA Cup final), Southampton, Tottenham Hotspur (reaching a League Cup final) and Wolverhampton Wanderers. He managed England to the second round of the 1998 FIFA World Cup, where they lost to Argentina on penalties. He was dismissed from the England job in 1999 following an interview with Matt Dickinson in which he was widely interpreted as saying that people with disabilities and others are affected by karma from past lives. He said that his words were "misconstrued, misunderstood and misinterpreted" and that disabled people had his "overwhelming support, care, consideration and dedication".

== Early life ==
Hoddle was born in 1957 in Harlington, Middlesex, to Derek Hoddle and Teresa Roberts. The family lived in Hillingdon, Middlesex. In the late 1950s and 1960, Hoddle watched his father playing for Corinthian League club Uxbridge. When Hoddle was four, the family moved to Harlow, Essex, where he attended St Alban's Primary School and the Burnt Mill Comprehensive School.

Hoddle began supporting Tottenham Hotspur when he was eight. His favourite player was Martin Chivers. He first came to the attention of Tottenham when Chivers and Ray Evans went to present prizes at a local school cup final and noticed the potential of an 11-year-old Hoddle. On Chivers's recommendation, he was invited to train with the club at Tottenham's practice ground in Cheshunt. At the age of 15, Hoddle played for Harlow-based Sunday league club Longmans, alongside his father.

== Playing career ==
=== Tottenham Hotspur ===
Hoddle joined Tottenham as a junior when he was 12, and signed for the club as an apprentice on 17 April 1974. He overcame knee problems in his early teens and collected eight England Youth caps, the first of these on 18 March 1975 against Spain. He made his Spurs first-team debut as a 17-year-old substitute for Cyril Knowles against Norwich City on 30 August 1975, a game that ended 2–2. Hoddle was forced to wait until 21 February 1976 to start a First Division match and immediately announced his arrival with the winning goal.

Hoddle flourished under the management of Keith Burkinshaw and despite the club's relegation to the Second Division in 1976–77 after 27 seasons of First Division football, a Hoddle-inspired Spurs side won promotion to the top flight at the first attempt. As Tottenham's transitional phase continued, Hoddle's international career began on 15 December 1976 in an Under-21 friendly fixture against Wales. He would collect another eleven caps at that level, and play twice for the England 'B' team prior to scoring on his full international debut against Bulgaria on 22 November 1979.

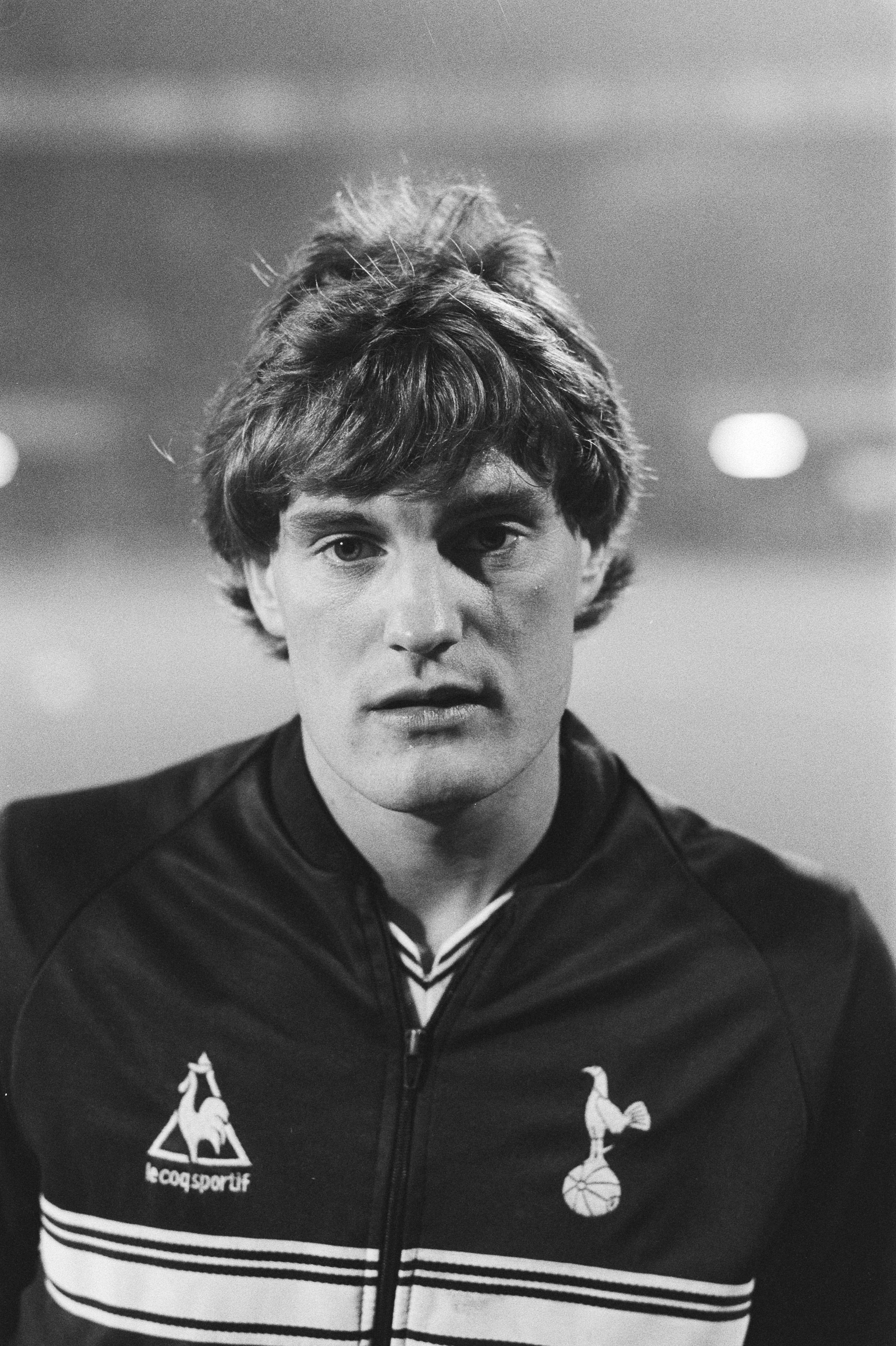
Hoddle with Spurs in a 1983 match against Feyenoord

The 1979–80 campaign heralded the emergence of Hoddle as a top-class player; the 22-year-old midfielder scored 19 goals in 41 league appearances and was awarded the PFA Young Player of the Year award at the end of the season. In 1981, he starred as Spurs won the FA Cup for the sixth time, defeating Manchester City after a replay. The following season, Tottenham retained the FA Cup (Hoddle scored in both the final and final replay) against Queen's Park Rangers and finished the League campaign in fourth place, the club's best league position since 1971. Hoddle was part of the Tottenham team which reached the final of the League Cup, losing 3–1 to Liverpool, and the semi-final stage of the European Cup Winners Cup. During the summer of 1982, Hoddle played in two of England's matches in the opening group phase of the FIFA World Cup, starting against Kuwait after a substitute appearance in a 2–0 victory over Czechoslovakia.

I've heard a lot about you, but I didn't realise how good you were until I played against you.

— Cruyff, in praise of Hoddle's game.

Hoddle's involvement in the following three seasons was limited by a number of niggling injury problems (he started only 76 of a possible 126 league matches) but nevertheless, Hoddle proved to be the architect behind the team's 1984 UEFA Cup triumph despite missing the final due to fitness concerns. In October 1983, he helped Spurs win 6–2 on aggregate against a Feyenoord Rotterdam side containing Johan Cruyff. Cruyff was dismissive of Hoddle before their first match, but after Hoddle's performance, Cruyff swapped shirts with Hoddle as a sign of respect.

Spurs came close to further honours in the next three seasons, reaching third place in the First Division and the quarter-finals of the UEFA Cup in 1984–85 and another FA Cup Final in 1987, losing 3–2 to Coventry City, the only time the North London club has experienced defeat in the final of the famous knock-out competition. The unexpected loss to the Midlands side was Hoddle's last match for Spurs, as newly appointed AS Monaco manager Arsène Wenger brought him to the principality for a fee of £750,000. Between 1975 and 1987, Hoddle scored 110 goals in 490 first-team matches in all competitions; only four players (Steve Perryman, Pat Jennings, Gary Mabbutt and Cyril Knowles) have made more appearances in a Spurs shirt. At international level, Hoddle won 44 caps for England during his Tottenham career.

=== AS Monaco ===
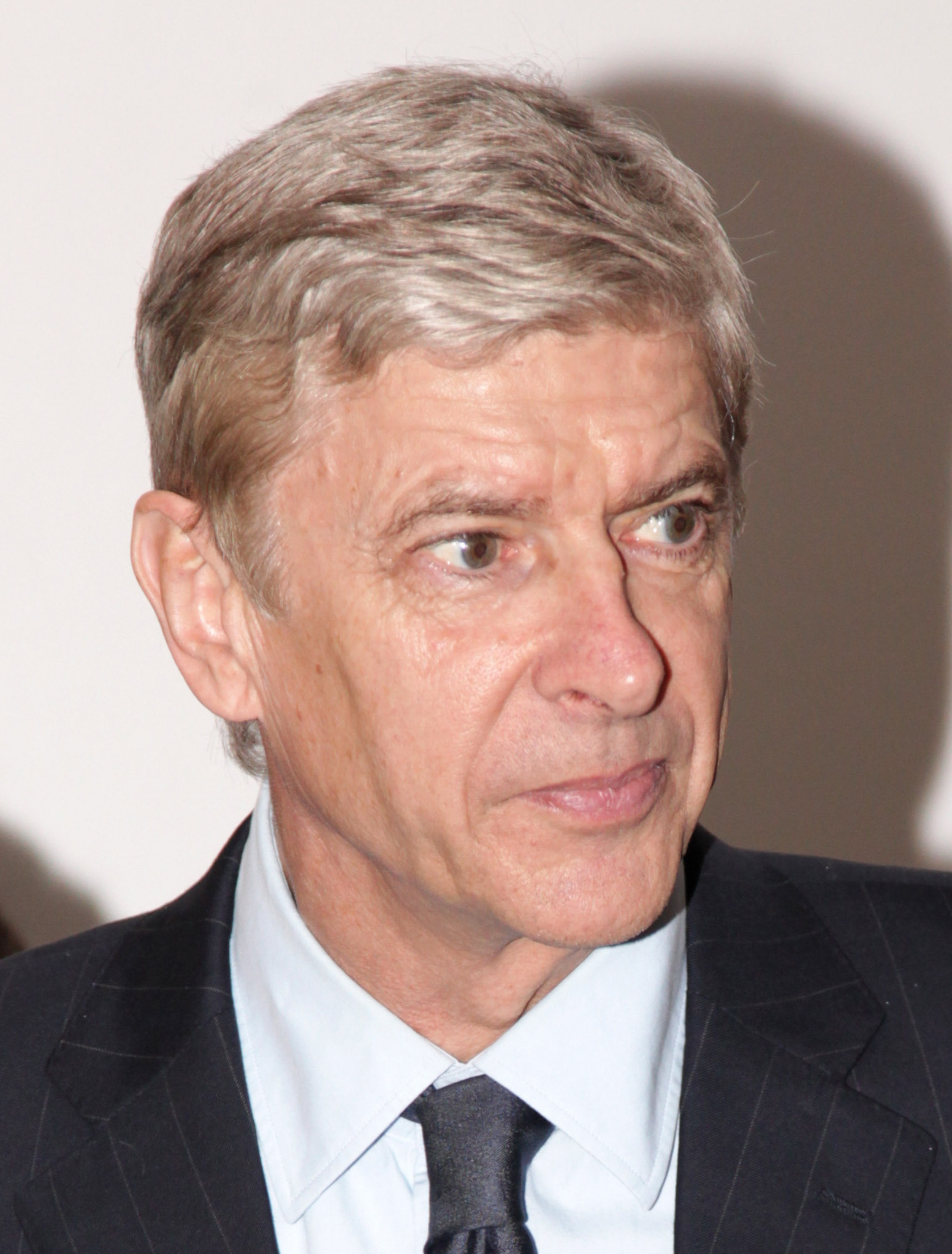
Hoddle played under Arsène Wenger at Monaco and won the league title in his first season with the club.

Hoddle announced in 1987 that he would be leaving Tottenham at the end of the season to pursue a career overseas. He joined AS Monaco alongside George Weah and fellow Englishman Mark Hateley and immediately inspired the club to the 1988 Ligue 1 championship, its first league title in six seasons. Hoddle was voted the Best Foreign Player in French football and helped to guide the team to the quarter-finals of the European Cup in the 1988–89 campaign; however, a severe knee injury curtailed Hoddle's career at the highest level, and in November 1990, the 33-year-old left the club by mutual consent, having helped to improve the standing of English footballers in foreign countries.

During his three-and-a-half-year spell in France, Hoddle won a further nine England caps, making his international farewell against the Soviet Union in June 1988. He returned to England and signed for Chelsea on a non-contract basis to regain his fitness, leaving Stamford Bridge in March 1991, without playing a senior match, to become player-manager of Swindon Town in the Second Division.

=== England international career ===
Hoddle made his debut alongside Kevin Reeves in England's Euro 1980 qualifying tie against Bulgaria on 22 November 1979, scoring in a 2–0 win at Wembley. He scored in his third appearance against Australia on 31 May 1980 in a friendly in Sydney. His third goal came in his fifth appearance on 25 March 1981 in a game against Spain at Wembley, which England lost 2–1. He received his tenth cap on 27 April 1982 in the British Home Championship clash with Wales in Cardiff, which England won 1–0. By this stage of his international career, he had scored four goals.

Hoddle was included in the 1982 and 1986 FIFA World Cup squads, and England reached the quarter-finals against Argentina in the latter. He also featured prominently in the European Championship squads of 1980 and 1988, making his 53rd and final international appearance in the final group game of UEFA Euro 1988, a 3–1 defeat to the Soviet Union in West Germany. He scored eight goals for the England senior side in a career stretching nine years, the last of his international goals coming on 23 April 1986 in a 2–1 friendly win over Scotland at Wembley.

== Managerial career ==
=== Swindon Town ===
When Hoddle arrived at Swindon in March 1991, the club was struggling in the aftermath of a financial scandal which had seen them stripped of promotion to the First Division at the end of the previous season, a controversy which had negatively impacted the team's league form as they had been forced to sell several key players, including midfielder Alan McLoughlin.

Hoddle prevented Swindon from slipping into the Third Division and further improvement throughout the 1991–92 season saw the Wiltshire club finish in eighth place, just missing out on a play-off place. They had briefly led the table in October.

Swindon reached the playoffs of the rebranded Division One in 1993 and beat Leicester City 4–3 at Wembley, and were then promoted to the Premier League. Hoddle scored Swindon's first goal of the final.

By the time he guided Swindon to promotion, Hoddle was already being linked with managerial vacancies at bigger clubs. Just days after guiding Swindon to promotion, he accepted the offer to manage Chelsea and was succeeded at Swindon by his assistant John Gorman, who had been widely expected to follow him to Stamford Bridge.

=== Chelsea ===
In June 1993, Hoddle became player-manager of Chelsea. His assistant at Chelsea was the former Tottenham manager Peter Shreeves, and they reached the FA Cup final in Hoddle's first season, losing 4–0 to Manchester United. But Manchester United had won the double, and consolation for their failure to win the trophy came in the form of a European Cup Winners' Cup place, Chelsea's first European campaign for more than 20 years. Chelsea finished 14th in the league that season.

Chelsea reached the semi-finals of the European Cup Winners' competition in 1994–95 and lost by a single goal to Real Zaragoza, who went on to beat Arsenal in the final. Hoddle guided Chelsea to the FA Cup semi-finals in 1995–96, but was unable to take them beyond 11th place in the Premiership; they had occupied this final position three times in four years. He did establish them as a force in cup competitions and made them capable of attracting top-class players—such as Ruud Gullit—to the club. Other notable signings were Mark Hughes, Dan Petrescu, Gavin Peacock, David Rocastle and Mark Stein.

=== England ===
Hoddle's three-year reign at Chelsea came to an end in the summer of 1996, after he had accepted the offer to manage the England national team, replacing Terry Venables after England's Euro 96 campaign, in which they finished as semi-finalists as the host nation. He guided England to qualification for the 1998 World Cup, securing the team's automatic qualification with a goalless draw in Rome against Italy. Under Hoddle England won Le Tournoi, England's first (and as of June 2026, only) tournament win since the 1966 World Cup. He later caused controversy by omitting Paul Gascoigne from the squad and installing supposed faith healer Eileen Drewery as part of the England coaching staff, which led to the team being dubbed "The Hod Squad". They reached the second round of the 1998 tournament, losing on penalties to Argentina.

Hoddle's 60% win rate during his spell as manager is only bettered by Alf Ramsey, Fabio Capello, Sam Allardyce (who only managed one game) and Gareth Southgate.

==== Dismissal from England job ====
My beliefs have evolved in the last eight or nine years, that the spirit has to come back again, that is nothing new, that has been around for thousands of years. You have to come back to learn and face some of the things you have done, good and bad. There are too many injustices around. You and I have been physically given two hands and two legs and half-decent brains. Some people have not been born like that for a reason. The karma is working from another lifetime. I have nothing to hide about that. It is not only people with disabilities. What you sow, you have to reap. You have to look at things that happened in your life and ask why. It comes around.

— Hoddle, on his belief system.

On 30 January 1999, with the England team preparing for Euro 2000, and amidst the fall-out from the previous season's World Cup, Hoddle gave an interview to Matt Dickinson of The Times newspaper in an attempt to defend himself against his critics (over issues such as Eileen Drewery and his ideology.) and show a strong front for the remainder of the qualifiers.

Dickinson's interview reported that Hoddle had a "controversial belief that the disabled, and others, are being punished for sins in a former life". Hoddle's comments were criticised by several politicians, including Sports Minister Tony Banks and Prime Minister Tony Blair. Public opinion, based upon the immediate media furore, resulted in 90% of respondents believing Hoddle should not continue as England manager, according to one BBC poll. The BBC survey showed that many considered his comments insensitive to disabled people, but others defended his right to express his religious beliefs by claiming that to sack him would constitute religious discrimination.

Hoddle said that he was unwilling to resign. He stated his words were misinterpreted and pointed out his contributions and commitment to organisations helping disabled people. The Football Association terminated Hoddle's contract on 2 February 1999, which was welcomed by representatives of disabled groups. The disabled rights campaigner Lord Ashley, while criticising Hoddle's views, defended his right to express them, likening the campaign against Hoddle to a "witchhunt", and considered Hoddle's dismissal "a sad day for British tolerance and freedom of speech". Some writers considered the remarks were used as a pretext to get rid of him, speculating that under most circumstances Hoddle would likely have merely been reprimanded, but that the combination of the remarks, poor recent results, and rumoured discontent among the players was enough to cause the Football Association to terminate his contract. Hoddle apologised for the offence that had been caused, stating it had never been his intention, and continued to fundraise for disabled groups after being dismissed.

=== Southampton ===
Hoddle became Southampton manager in January 2000, succeeding Dave Jones, who had been suspended to concentrate on clearing his name in connection with child abuse charges. Although these allegations were later found to be false, Jones was not reinstated and Hoddle continued as Southampton's manager. Hoddle kept the Saints in the Premier League with a 15th-place finish, but left in March 2001 to return to Tottenham as manager.

=== Tottenham Hotspur ===
Hoddle was appointed manager of Tottenham in March 2001, with John Gorman as his assistant, following the sacking of George Graham. His first match in charge was the FA Cup semi-final against north London rivals Arsenal which Spurs lost 2–1. Tottenham reached the League Cup final in February 2002. After winning 5–1 against Hoddle's former club Chelsea in the semi-final second leg, Spurs were the favourites but they lost 2–1 to Blackburn Rovers. The club's promising early season form (which saw Hoddle voted Premier League Manager of the Month for October 2001) dwindled away and they finished ninth in the Premiership.

Spurs began the 2002–03 season with Hoddle being named Premiership Manager of the Month for August 2002 after they ended the month top of the league. They finished tenth at the end of the season. The pressure began to build up on Hoddle, and he was sacked in September 2003 after a slow start to the season, in which the team picked up four points from their opening six league games. His final game in charge was a 3–1 loss to his former side Southampton.

=== Wolverhampton Wanderers ===
Hoddle was linked with a return to Southampton in March 2004, but opposition from supporters meant chairman Rupert Lowe pursued alternative targets and ultimately selected Paul Sturrock instead. Hoddle instead returned to management on 7 December 2004 with Wolverhampton Wanderers, again succeeding Dave Jones. Wolves lost only one of their remaining 25 games but failed to reach the play-offs because 15 of those games had been draws. In the 2005–06 season, with the club drawing 19 of their 46 league game, Wolves finished seventh, eight points off the playoffs. Some Wolves fans turned against Hoddle and there were chants against him during the last home game of the season against Watford. The board kept faith with Hoddle, but he stepped down on 1 July 2006, stating differing expectations between himself and the club as the reason for his departure.

=== Football academy ===
By January 2008, Hoddle was attempting to raise the capital to form the Glenn Hoddle Academy, based in Spain. The aim of the academy is to give another chance to young players released by football clubs in England to become professional players. Ikechi Anya was his first player at the academy to get a professional contract at a club, with Sevilla Atlético.

In June 2011, it was announced that The Glenn Hoddle Academy had linked up with English Conference North side Hyde. The Academy had previously enjoyed a link with the Spanish fourth-tier side Jerez Industrial, providing their entire squad and coaches, but fell out in a dispute over cash.

According to Companies House, the Glenn Hoddle Academy was dissolved on 20 May 2014.

=== Management offers ===
Hoddle said in December 2013 that he been offered a chance to return to management 26 times in seven years, but commented that he would not return to management until his academy was able to run itself. In April 2014, he said he had come close to taking over from André Villas-Boas at Tottenham, before the job was given to Tim Sherwood. "I did have talks with Daniel Levy and the club," Hoddle said. "He wanted a little bit of advice and a bit of a sounding board for himself. [I said] 'I am there for you if you want me to take it to the end of the season and then we will have a little look at it then, I would be prepared to do that'. I wouldn't do it for any other club for that short period of time. It was just that it is in my DNA. I have loved my time at other clubs, I really have, but being a Spurs supporter since I was eight, going there very young, it is in my blood."

In August 2014, Hoddle was appointed first-team coach at Queens Park Rangers under Harry Redknapp; when Redknapp resigned on 3 February 2015, Hoddle also left the club.

In June 2016, after England's 2–1 loss to Iceland at Euro 2016 and manager Roy Hodgson's subsequent resignation, Harry Redknapp and Alan Shearer both put forward Hoddle as a candidate for the job before Sam Allardyce was appointed.

== Media career ==
Since his retirement from coaching, Hoddle has worked as a pundit for ESPN, ITV Sport and BT Sport. He began working with ESPN during Euro 2012 as a pundit. Since then, he has worked with ITV for the 2014 World Cup, Euro 2016 and the 2018 World Cup. He also does punditry and co-commentary for TNT Sports on their telecasts of the Premier League, FA Cup, Champions League and Europa League.

== Music ==
In May 1987, Hoddle released the pop single "Diamond Lights", which reached number 12 in the UK singles chart. It was a duet with his Spurs and England teammate Chris Waddle.

In 2021, Hoddle appeared as a contestant on the second series of the British version of The Masked Singer, masked as the Grandfather Clock. He finished in ninth place.

== Personal life and health ==
In 1986, while on holiday in Israel, Hoddle said that he had an experience which led him to become a born-again Christian.

Hoddle has been married twice, firstly to Christine Ann Stirling (1979–1998) and subsequently to Vanessa Colburn (2000–2015). He has three children with his first wife. Hoddle's uncle, Dave, was part of the Stansted team that won the 1984 FA Vase.

In 1996, his younger brother, former footballer Carl Hoddle, overdosed on paracetamol, but recovered. In March 2008, Carl died at the age of 40, after collapsing suddenly from a brain aneurysm.

On 27 October 2018, his 61st birthday, Hoddle suffered a cardiac arrest in a London TV studio and was taken to hospital for emergency heart surgery. The Guardian reported that he had been close to death and was saved by the actions of an employee at BT Sport, Simon Daniels, who knew how to use a defibrillator. On 23 November 2018, Hoddle left St Bartholomew's Hospital to recuperate at home after his hospital treatment.

Hoddle published his autobiography, Playmaker, in 2021.

== Career statistics ==
Appearances and goals by club, season and competition
Club	Season	League			National cup (Note: Includes FA Cup, Coupe de France)		League cup (Note: Includes Football League Cup)		Continental		Total	
Club	Season	Division	Apps	Goals	Apps	Goals	Apps	Goals	Apps	Goals	Apps	Goals
Tottenham Hotspur	1975–76	First Division	7	1	0	0	0	0	–		7	1
Tottenham Hotspur	1976–77	First Division	39	4	1	0	2	1	–		42	5
Tottenham Hotspur	1977–78	Second Division	41	12	2	1	2	0	–		45	13
Tottenham Hotspur	1978–79	First Division	35	7	5	1	2	1	–		42	9
Tottenham Hotspur	1979–80	First Division	41	19	6	2	2	1	–		49	22
Tottenham Hotspur	1980–81	First Division	38	12	9	2	6	1	–		53	15
Tottenham Hotspur	1981–82	First Division	34	10	7	3	8	1	8 (Note: Appearances in UEFA Cup Winners' Cup)	1	57	15
Tottenham Hotspur	1982–83	First Division	24	1	1	0	3	0	1	0	29	1
Tottenham Hotspur	1983–84	First Division	24	4	3	0	3	1	6 (Note: Appearances in UEFA Cup)	0	36	5
Tottenham Hotspur	1984–85	First Division	28	8	3	0	3	0	6	0	40	8
Tottenham Hotspur	1985–86	First Division	31	7	5	1	5	0	–		41	8
Tottenham Hotspur	1986–87	First Division	3	6	1	8	4	–		49	8	
Tottenham Hotspur	Total		377	88	48	11	44	10	21	1	490	110
Monaco	1987–88	Division 1	34	8	3	1	–		–		37	9
Monaco	1988–89	Division 1	32	18	9	2	–		6 (Note: Appearances in European Cup)	0	47	20
Monaco	1989–90	Division 1	3	1	0	0	–		0	0	3	1
Monaco	1990–91	Division 1	0	0	0	0	–		0	0	0	0
Monaco	Total		69	27	12	3	—		6	0	87	30
Swindon Town	1991–92	Second Division	22	0	0	0	3	0	–		25	0
Swindon Town	1992–93	First Division	45	2	1	0	3	1	–		49	3
Swindon Town	Total		67	2	1	0	6	1	0	0	74	3
Chelsea	1993–94	Premier League	19	1	2	0	3	0	–		24	1
Chelsea	1994–95	Premier League	12	0	0	0	0	0	3	0	15	0
Chelsea	Total		31	1	2	0	3	0	3	0	39	1
Career total			544	118	63	14	53	11	30	1	690	144

=== International ===
Appearances and goals by national team and year
National team	Year	Apps	Goals
England	1979	1	1
England	1980	3	1
England	1981	4	1
England	1982	6	2
England	1983	4	1
England	1984	1	0
England	1985	9	1
England	1986	13	1
England	1987	6	0
England	1988	6	0
Total		53	8

List of international goals scored by Glenn Hoddlle
No.	Date	Venue	Opponent	Score	Result	Competition
1	17 October 1979	Wembley Stadium, London	Bulgaria	2–0	2–0	UEFA Euro 1980 qualifying Group 1
2	31 May 1980	Sydney Cricket Ground, Sydney	Australia	0–1	1–2	Friendly
3	25 March 1981	Wembley Stadium, London	Spain	1–1	1–2	Friendly
4	23 February 1982	Wembley Stadium, London	Northern Ireland	4–0	4–0	1981–82 British Home Championship
5	15 December 1982	Wembley Stadium, London	Luxembourg	8–0	9–0	UEFA Euro 1984 qualifying Group 3
6	12 October 1983	Népstadion, Budapest	Hungary	0–1	0–3	UEFA Euro 1984 qualifying Group 3
7	11 September 1985	Wembley Stadium, London	Romania	1–0	1–1	1986 FIFA World Cup qualification – UEFA Group 3
8	23 April 1986	Wembley Stadium, London	Scotland	2–0	2–1	1986 Rous Cup

=== Managerial statistics ===
Team	From	To	Record				
Team	From	To	G	W	D	L	Win %
Swindon Town	April 1991	June 1993	115	49	32	34	42.61
Chelsea	June 1993	May 1996	157	53	54	50	33.76
England	September 1996	February 1999	28	17	6	5	60.71
Southampton	January 2000	March 2001	52	22	12	18	42.31
Tottenham Hotspur	April 2001	21 September 2003	104	41	18	45	39.42
Wolverhampton Wanderers	7 December 2004	1 July 2006	76	27	34	15	35.53
Total			532	209	156	167	39.38

== Honours ==
=== Player ===
Tottenham Hotspur

- FA Cup: 1980–81, 1981–82; runner-up: 1986–87
- FA Charity Shield: 1981 (shared)
- UEFA Cup: 1983–84
- Football League Cup runner-up: 1981–82

AS Monaco

- Division 1: 1987–88
- Coupe de France: 1990–91, runner-up: 1988–89

Individual

- PFA Young Player of the Year: 1979–80
- PFA Team of the Year: 1977–78 Second Division, 1979–80 First Division, 1981–82 First Division, 1983–84 First Division, 1985–86 First Division, 1986–87 First Division
- PFA Team of the Century (1977–1996): 2007
- Division 1 Foreign Player of the Year: 1987–88
- English Football Hall of Fame Inductee: 2007

=== Player-manager ===
Swindon Town

- Football League First Division play-offs: 1993

Chelsea

- FA Cup runner-up: 1993–94

=== Manager ===
Tottenham Hotspur

- Football League Cup runner-up: 2001–02

England

- Tournoi de France: 1997

Individual

- Premier League Manager of the Month: October 2001, August 2002
