= Tony Galvin =

Republic of Ireland international footballer (born 1956)

Personal information
- Full name: Anthony Galvin
- Date of birth: 12 July 1956 (age 70)
- Place of birth: Huddersfield, England
- Height: 5 ft 9 in (1.75 m)
- Position: Winger

Senior career*
Years	Team	Apps	(Gls)
- Goole Town
1978–1987	Tottenham Hotspur	201	(20)
1987–1989	Sheffield Wednesday	36	(1)
1989–1990	Swindon Town	11	(0)
- Gateshead
Total		248	(21)

International career
- England schools
1982–1989	Republic of Ireland	29	(1)
- * Club domestic league appearances and goals

Anthony Galvin (born 12 July 1956) is a former professional footballer who played as a winger. He played most successfully with Tottenham Hotspur, for whom he played 201 league games. He finished his league career with spells at Sheffield Wednesday and Swindon Town. Born in England, he played for the Republic of Ireland, winning 29 caps including 3 in Euro 88. His brother Chris Galvin was also a professional footballer.

== Club career ==
=== Tottenham Hotspur ===
Galvin was born in Huddersfield, West Riding of Yorkshire, England. He was bought by Tottenham Hotspur manager Keith Burkinshaw in 1978 from Northern Premier League side Goole Town on the recommendation of Tottenham's double winning manager Bill Nicholson. On 3 February 1979, he made his debut in the 3–0 home defeat to Manchester City highlights of which was shown on The Big Match. His first goal coming at the Baseball Ground against Derby County. Around 1981 he became a regular with his strength in wing play being that he was difficult to knock off the ball and was able to put in accurate crosses. He was a member of the successful Spurs side of the early 80s, winning two successive FA Cups in 1981 & 1982, and also the UEFA Cup in 1984. In all he played 273 first team games and scored 31 goals including a hat trick against Southampton in May 1986.

=== Sheffield Wednesday ===
He was sold by new Spurs manager David Pleat to Sheffield Wednesday in 1987, but his spell at Wednesday was hit by injury.

=== Swindon Town ===
Galvin tried to make a fresh start at Swindon Town, where he was signed by former Spurs teammate Ossie Ardiles in 1989. He stayed as a player for the rest of the season where Swindon reached the Division 2 play-offs. He then went on to become Ardiles' assistant, before following him to Newcastle United where he took a similar position until Ardiles was sacked in 1992.

== International career ==
Galvin won 29 caps for the Republic of Ireland, despite playing for England schools. Qualifying through his Limerick born grandfather he made his debut for Ireland in the European Championships qualifier against The Netherlands in Rotterdam on 22 September 1982 and scored his only goal away to Luxembourg in a Euro 88 qualifier. He was named by Jack Charlton in Ireland's first ever finals squad at Euro 88, and started all 3 games against England, USSR and the Netherlands. Galvin was able to understand the USSR's tactical calls during a game in Euro 88 because he had a degree in Russian.

== Outside of football ==
Before joining Spurs, Galvin gained a degree in Russian studies at Hull University. He also studied teaching as a postgraduate at Trent Polytechnic. After his football career ended he returned to education teaching at a London College.

== Honours ==
=== As a player ===
Tottenham Hotspur

- FA Cup: 1980–81, 1981–82
- FA Charity Shield: 1981
- UEFA Cup: 1983–84
- Football League Cup runner-up: 1981–82

== See also ==
- List of Republic of Ireland international footballers born outside the Republic of Ireland
