= Garth Crooks =

English footballer (born 1958)

Garth Crooks OBE
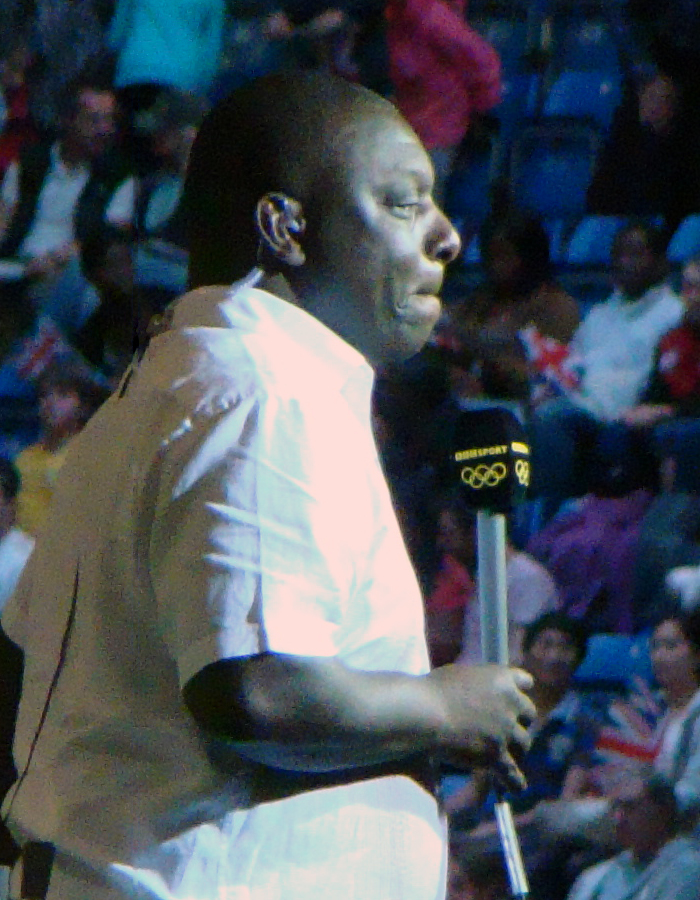
- Crooks in 2012

Personal information
- Full name: Garth Anthony Crooks
- Date of birth: 10 March 1958 (age 68)
- Place of birth: Stoke-on-Trent, England
- Height: 5 ft 8 in (1.73 m)
- Position: Forward

Senior career*
| Years | Team | Apps | (Gls) |
| 1976–1980 | Stoke City | 147 | (48) |
| 1980–1985 | Tottenham Hotspur | 125 | (48) |
| 1983–1984 | → Manchester United (loan) | 7 | (2) |
| 1985–1987 | West Bromwich Albion | 40 | (16) |
| 1987–1990 | Charlton Athletic | 56 | (15) |
| Total | | 375 | (129) |

International career
| 1979–1980 | England U21 | 4 | (3) |
- * Club domestic league appearances and goals

Garth Anthony Crooks, OBE (born 10 March 1958) is an English football pundit and former professional player. He played from 1976 to 1990, for Stoke City, Tottenham Hotspur, Manchester United, West Bromwich Albion and Charlton Athletic.

== Club career ==
Crooks was born in Bucknall, Stoke-on-Trent, and is of Jamaican descent. He progressed through the youth ranks at Stoke City signing professional contract forms in March 1976. He made his debut in April at home to Coventry City becoming the first black player to play for Stoke since Roy Brown in the 1940s. In the 1976–77 season his first full season he was top-scorer albeit with just six goals as Stoke's financial problems saw them relegated to the Second Division. Many black players at the time suffered racist abuse from the stands. Crooks was no exception, but his "cocky arrogance" meant it did little to affect him.

His pace caused problems for Second Division defences as he again top-scored with 19 in 1977–78 as Stoke failed to mount a serious promotion attempt. Manager Alan Durban decided to play Crooks as a winger at the start of the 1978–79 season, a decision which Crooks openly criticised. He was restored to his striker role with the season coming to an end which saw Stoke gain promotion by beating Notts County on the final day of the season. He scored 14 goals in 1979–80 as Stoke safely avoided relegation but tensions between Crooks and Durban resurfaced which led to Crooks handing in a transfer request.

In 1979, he played in a benefit match for West Bromwich Albion player Len Cantello, that saw a team of white players play against a team of black players.

He was transferred to Tottenham Hotspur in the summer of 1980 for a fee of £650,000. He scored on his debut against Nottingham Forest, and formed a successful striking partnership with Steve Archibald. With Crooks leading the line, Spurs won the FA Cup in 1981 and 1982, and the 1984 UEFA Cup final against Anderlecht. Crooks is frequently credited as the first black player to score in an FA Cup final for his equalising goal in a 3–2 win over Manchester City in 1981, though this was pre-dated by Mike Trebilcock in 1966. Crooks later went on loan to Manchester United and had spells at West Bromwich Albion and Charlton Athletic before a knee injury forced his retirement in 1990. Charlton were relegated from the First Division, just as the West Bromwich Albion side he had played in four seasons earlier had been.

== International career ==
Crooks represented England at international level, making four appearances for the England under-21s, for whom he scored three goals.

== Media career ==
Crooks first worked in the media as a guest presenter on 25 March 1982's Top of the Pops on BBC1 (with Peter Powell), before working as a match analyst at the 1982 and 1990 World Cups. He later worked as a Match of the Day's reporter at the England camp at Euro 2000 and the 2002 World Cup.

He appeared regularly as a pundit on Final Score from its first series in 2001 until 2022, and on rare occasions on Match of the Day as a replacement for regular pundits and interviewing players for Football Focus. In August 2024, he ended his Premier League team of the week column on the BBC News website due to creative differences.

In 1988, Crooks became the first black chairman of the Professional Footballers' Association but gave up the role after retiring in 1990. In the 1999 Birthday Honours, he was appointed an Officer of the Order of the British Empire (OBE) "for services to the Institute of Professional Sport."

Away from football, he hosted the BBC Two political late-night programme Despatch Box in the late 1990s and early 2000s.

In 1992, Crooks was pranked in the "Mr. Blobby" segment of Noel's House Party.

== Career statistics ==
Appearances and goals by club, season and competition
| Club | Season | League | | | FA Cup | | League Cup | | Europe | | Other | | Total | |
| Club | Season | Division | Apps | Goals | Apps | Goals | Apps | Goals | Apps | Goals | Apps | Goals | Apps | Goals |
|---|---|---|---|---|---|---|---|---|---|---|---|---|---|---|
| Stoke City | 1975–76 | First Division | 2 | 0 | 0 | 0 | 0 | 0 | — | | — | | 2 | 0 |
| Stoke City | 1976–77 | First Division | 23 | 6 | 1 | 0 | 2 | 0 | — | | — | | 26 | 6 |
| Stoke City | 1977–78 | Second Division | 42 | 18 | 2 | 1 | 1 | 0 | — | | — | | 45 | 19 |
| Stoke City | 1978–79 | Second Division | 40 | 12 | 1 | 0 | 5 | 1 | — | | — | | 46 | 13 |
| Stoke City | 1979–80 | First Division | 40 | 12 | 1 | 0 | 4 | 2 | — | | — | | 45 | 14 |
| Stoke City | Total | | 147 | 48 | 5 | 1 | 12 | 3 | — | | — | | 164 | 52 |
| Tottenham Hotspur | 1980–81 | First Division | 40 | 16 | 9 | 4 | 6 | 2 | 0 | 0 | — | | 55 | 22 |
| Tottenham Hotspur | 1981–82 | First Division | 27 | 13 | 7 | 3 | 7 | 0 | 5 (Note: Appearances in European Cup Winners' Cup) | 2 | 0 | 0 | 46 | 18 |
| Tottenham Hotspur | 1982–83 | First Division | 26 | 8 | 2 | 1 | 4 | 3 | 4 | 3 | 1 (Note: Appearances in FA Charity Shield) | 0 | 37 | 15 |
| Tottenham Hotspur | 1983–84 | First Division | 10 | 1 | 0 | 0 | 1 | 0 | 1 (Note: Appearances in UEFA Cup) | 1 | 0 | 0 | 12 | 2 |
| Tottenham Hotspur | 1984–85 | First Division | 22 | 10 | 3 | 1 | 2 | 4 | 6 | 3 | 0 | 0 | 33 | 18 |
| Tottenham Hotspur | Total | | 125 | 48 | 21 | 9 | 20 | 9 | 16 | 9 | 1 | 0 | 183 | 75 |
| Manchester United (loan) | 1983–84 | First Division | 7 | 2 | 0 | 0 | 0 | 0 | 0 | 0 | 0 | 0 | 7 | 2 |
| West Bromwich Albion | 1985–86 | First Division | 19 | 5 | 0 | 0 | 6 | 2 | — | | 3 (Note: Appearances in Full Members' Cup) | 3 | 28 | 10 |
| West Bromwich Albion | 1986–87 | Second Division | 21 | 11 | 1 | 0 | 0 | 0 | — | | 1 | 0 | 23 | 11 |
| West Bromwich Albion | Total | | 40 | 16 | 1 | 0 | 6 | 2 | — | | 4 | 3 | 51 | 21 |
| Charlton Athletic | 1986–87 | First Division | 7 | 2 | 0 | 0 | 0 | 0 | — | | 5 (Note: Appearances in Football League First Division play-offs) | 0 | 12 | 2 |
| Charlton Athletic | 1987–88 | First Division | 28 | 10 | 1 | 0 | 2 | 2 | — | | 1 | 0 | 32 | 12 |
| Charlton Athletic | 1988–89 | First Division | 14 | 2 | 3 | 1 | 0 | 0 | — | | 0 | 0 | 17 | 3 |
| Charlton Athletic | 1989–90 | First Division | 0 | 0 | 0 | 0 | 0 | 0 | — | | 1 | 0 | 1 | 0 |
| Charlton Athletic | 1990–91 | Second Division | 7 | 1 | 0 | 0 | 2 | 0 | — | | 0 | 0 | 9 | 1 |
| Charlton Athletic | Total | | 56 | 15 | 4 | 1 | 4 | 2 | — | | 7 | 0 | 71 | 18 |
| Career total | | | 375 | 129 | 31 | 11 | 42 | 16 | 16 | 9 | 12 | 3 | 476 | 168 |

== Honours ==
Tottenham Hotspur

- FA Cup: 1980–81, 1981–82
- UEFA Cup: 1983–84
- Football League Cup runner-up: 1981–82
