= Paul Miller (footballer, born 1959) =

English footballer

Personal information
- Full name: Paul Richard Miller
- Date of birth: 11 October 1959 (age 67)
- Place of birth: Stepney, London, England
- Height: 6 ft 1 in (1.85 m)
- Position: Centre back

Youth career
- Tottenham Hotspur

Senior career*
Years	Team	Apps	(Gls)
1977–1987	Tottenham Hotspur	208	(7)
–	→ Skeid (loan)		
1987–1988	Charlton Athletic	42	(2)
1988–1989	Watford	20	(1)
1989–1990	AFC Bournemouth	47	(1)
1989	→ Brentford (loan)	3	(0)
1990–1991	Swansea City	12	(0)
Total		332	(13)
- * Club domestic league appearances and goals

Paul Richard Miller (born 11 October 1959) is an English former footballer who played in the Football League for Tottenham Hotspur, Charlton Athletic, Watford, AFC Bournemouth, Brentford and Swansea City. Miller's favoured position was centre back.

Miller was born in Stepney, London. In his early years, he played his youth football in the London Borough of Hackney for the ELY (East London Youth) team, winning a league runners-up medal in 1970 at under-11 level. Miller began his professional career at Tottenham Hotspur, signing as apprentice in 1976, professional a year later, and spending a season with Skeid in the Norwegian League to gain experience. He was part of Spurs' FA Cup winning team in 1981, conceding a penalty after bringing down Dave Bennett in the replay which Tottenham won 3–2. He won a second FA Cup-winner's medal with Spurs the following year, and played a key role in their 1983–84 UEFA Cup victory, scoring an away goal in the first leg of the final against Anderlecht. He later played for Charlton Athletic, Watford, AFC Bournemouth, Brentford and Swansea City.

== Honours ==
Tottenham Hotspur

- FA Cup 1980–81, 1981–82
- FA Charity Shield: 1981 (shared)
- UEFA Cup 1983–84
- Football League Cup runner-up: 1981–82

Charlton Athletic

- Full Members' Cup runner-up: 1986–87
