= Keith Burkinshaw =

English footballer and manager

Personal information
- Full name: Harry Keith Burkinshaw
- Date of birth: 23 June 1935 (age 91)
- Place of birth: Higham, Barnsley, England
- Position: Defender

Youth career
- Wolves

Senior career*
Years	Team	Apps	(Gls)
–1953	Denaby United		
1953–1957	Liverpool	1	(0)
1957–1965	Workington	293	(9)
1965–1968	Scunthorpe United	108	(3)
Total		402	(12)

Managerial career
- 1964–1965: Workington
- 1966–1967: Scunthorpe United (caretaker)
- 1976–1984: Tottenham Hotspur
- 1984–1986: Bahrain
- 1987–1988: Sporting CP
- 1988–1989: Gillingham
- 1991: Pahang
- 1993–1994: West Bromwich Albion
- 1997: Aberdeen (caretaker)
- * Club domestic league appearances and goals

Harry Keith Burkinshaw (born 23 June 1935) is an English former professional footballer and football manager. He is one of the most successful managers of Tottenham Hotspur, winning three major trophies for the club as manager there. He was the last English manager to win the UEFA Cup in 1984.

== Playing career ==
Burkinshaw was born in Higham, Barnsley, West Riding of Yorkshire. He passed his 11-plus and attended Barnsley grammar school, being in the same school year as Michael Parkinson. He obtained six O-levels and after leaving school, he began his footballing career with Midland League side Denaby United while working at Dodworth Colliery. He had a brief spell as an amateur with Wolverhampton Wanderers before joining Liverpool in November 1953. He spent a period in the British Army, serving alongside Duncan Edwards in Wales.

Burkinshaw played just once for Liverpool, against Port Vale in April 1955, moving to Workington in December 1957 for a fee of £3,000. He was player-manager of Workington between November 1964 and March 1965, leaving to join Scunthorpe United in May 1965, having played 293 league games for Workington. He played a further 108 league games for Scunthorpe, and had a short spell as caretaker manager before retiring from playing in May 1968.

== Coaching and managerial career ==
Shortly after announcing his retirement, Burkinshaw moved to Zambia where he coached for a few months before returning to England as first team coach of Newcastle United. He was sacked by Newcastle on 1 May 1975 and joined Tottenham Hotspur as coach a month later. He became manager after Terry Neill left as manager for Arsenal in 1976. He was manager from 14 July 1976 to 31 May 1984, and he won more major competitions at the club than all but one other Spurs manager (that being Bill Nicholson). Spurs were relegated in Burkinshaw's first year in charge but bounced straight back for promotion the following year. He signed two Argentine World Cup stars, Osvaldo Ardiles and Ricardo Villa, in 1978. It was considered a brave move but Ardiles would become one of the Spurs greats and Villa would score one of the greatest goals ever seen at Wembley in the 1981 FA Cup Final replay. Burkinshaw's Spurs, with Ardiles, Villa and Glenn Hoddle, won two successive FA Cups.

In his final game in charge, Spurs won the UEFA Cup for a second time after a penalty shoot-out after the second leg at White Hart Lane. In doing so, they beat an Anderlecht team that included the future Spurs Sporting Director Frank Arnesen. On leaving White Hart Lane for the last time, brought about by a disagreement with the board, he was said to have remarked: "There used to be a football club over there" (actually a misattribution – it was written by journalist Ken Jones who mentioned to Burkinshaw as he was leaving the club the Frank Sinatra's song "There Used to Be a Ballpark", said to be about the demolition of Ebbets Field, and Burkinshaw nodded in agreement.)

In June 1984 he was appointed as coach to the Bahrain national side. He left that role in July 1986. Burkinshaw later managed Sporting Clube de Portugal until he was sacked in February 1988. In October 1988 he returned to England as manager of Gillingham, but resigned in April 1989 with the team on the verge of relegation to Division Four.

Burkinshaw took charge of big-spending Malaysian state team Pahang between late April and July 1991, leading them to the top of the league table before departing for Swindon Town.

Burkinshaw was later Chief Scout for Glenn Hoddle and Ossie Ardiles at Swindon Town and in May 1992 became assistant to Ardiles at West Bromwich Albion. When Ardiles moved to manage Tottenham in the summer of 1993, Burkinshaw was promoted to Albion manager. His career as Albion manager lasted just one season (1993–94) and he was sacked after they narrowly avoided relegation back to Division Two.

He was later Director of Football at Aberdeen before briefly taking charge as caretaker-manager at Pittodrie when Roy Aitken was sacked in 1997, he left when Alex Miller was appointed as the club's new manager.

In March 2005 Burkinshaw was appointed assistant manager at Watford. He left this position in December 2007 due to a serious family illness, having helped the club reach promotion to the Premier League in 2006.

== Honours ==
=== As a manager ===
Tottenham Hotspur

- FA Cup: 1980–81, 1981–82
- UEFA Cup: 1983–84
- FA Charity Shield: 1981 (shared)
- Football League Cup runner-up: 1981–82

Sporting CP

- Supertaça Cândido de Oliveira: 1987–88

== See also ==
- List of UEFA Cup winning managers
