= Peter Barnes (footballer) =

English footballer (born 1957)

Personal information
- Full name: Peter Simon Barnes
- Date of birth: 10 June 1957 (age 69)
- Place of birth: Manchester, England
- Height: 5 ft 10 in (1.78 m)
- Position: Left winger

Youth career
- 1972–1974: Manchester City

Senior career*
| Years | Team | Apps | (Gls) |
| 1974–1979 | Manchester City | 115 | (15) |
| 1979–1981 | West Bromwich Albion | 77 | (23) |
| 1981–1982 | Leeds United | 31 | (1) |
| 1982–1983 | Real Betis | 16 | (1) |
| 1983–1984 | Leeds United | 27 | (4) |
| 1984 | → Manchester United (loan) | 0 | (0) |
| 1984–1985 | Coventry City | 18 | (2) |
| 1985–1987 | Manchester United | 20 | (2) |
| 1987–1988 | Manchester City | 8 | (0) |
| 1987 | → Bolton Wanderers (loan) | 2 | (0) |
| 1987–1988 | → Port Vale (loan) | 3 | (0) |
| 1988 | Hull City | 11 | (0) |
| 1988 | Farense | 1 | (0) |
| 1988–1989 | Bolton Wanderers | 3 | (0) |
| 1989 | Sunderland | 1 | (0) |
| 1989 | → Stockport County (loan) | 0 | (0) |
| 1989 | Footscray JUST | 2 | (0) |
| 1989 | Hamrun Spartans | 7 | (4) |
| 1989 | Bury | 0 | (0) |
| 1989 | Drogheda United | 3 | (0) |
| 1990 | Tampa Bay Rowdies | 11 | (1) |
| 1990 | Stafford Rangers | 5 | (0) |
| 1990 | Northwich Victoria | 7 | (0) |
| 1991 | Wrexham | 0 | (0) |
| 1991 | Radcliffe Borough | | |
| 1991 | Mossley | 8 | (0) |
| 1992–1993 | Cliftonville | 1 | (0) |
| Total | | 377 | (53) |

International career
| 1975 | England Youth | 8 | (1) |
| 1976–1978 | England U21 | 9 | (2) |
| 1977–1982 | England | 22 | (4) |
| 1980 | England B | 1 | (0) |

Managerial career
- 1995–1996: Runcorn
- 1998: Gibraltar
- * Club domestic league appearances and goals

Peter Simon Barnes (born 10 June 1957) is an English former international football player, manager and pundit. An attacking left-sided winger, his playing career spanned 19 years and took him to 25 clubs across eight countries. He is the son of Ken Barnes, who won the FA Cup with Manchester City in 1956. An England Youth and under-21 international, Barnes was a member of the UEFA European Under-19 Championship winning team in 1975. He won 22 senior caps for England, scoring four goals. Though he was never selected in a squad for a major tournament, he played in two victorious British Home Championship campaigns.

Barnes began his career as an apprentice at Manchester City in July 1972 and turned professional two years later. He made his Football League debut in October 1974, aged 17. He scored in City's 1976 League Cup final victory and was named as PFA Young Player of the Year. He played in the UEFA Cup and unsuccessful First Division title campaigns, scoring 22 goals in 151 appearances in all competitions. He became West Bromwich Albion's record buy at £748,000 in July 1979 and spent two seasons at the club, scoring 25 goals in 92 matches. Leeds United broke their club record transfer when signing him for £750,000 plus £180,000 "tariffs" in 1981. The move proved to be a poor one. After Leeds were relegated into the Second Division, he was bought by Spanish club Real Betis for £300,000. He made 16 La Liga appearances, scoring one goal, before returning to Leeds United for the 1983–84 season.

Barnes was signed by Coventry City for £65,000 in October 1984 but was dropped by the end of the 1984–85 campaign. Former West Bromwich Albion manager Ron Atkinson then signed him for Manchester United for a fee of £30,000, and a run of good form prompted speculation of a return to the international fold before he suffered a calf injury in November 1985. He was sold to former club Manchester City for £20,000 in January 1987, but he failed to establish himself in the starting eleven. He spent the next five years moving from club to club, never featuring more than eleven times for the same team. After his retirement, he briefly managed Conference club Runcorn. He had numerous jobs, including working as a television and radio pundit.

== Club career ==
=== Manchester City ===
==== Teenage years: 1972–1977 ====
Born in Manchester, Barnes graduated from Chorlton High School and represented Manchester Boys. He began his playing career at Manchester City after becoming an apprentice at the club in July 1972. He had seven trials with Leeds United, whose manager, Don Revie, was a friend and former teammate to his father. Johnny Hart, a backroom staff member at Manchester City, had been told that Barnes was about to sign with Leeds on schoolboy forms and so intervened to get Barnes a place as a schoolboy with City.

He turned professional at the age of 17 and made his first-team debut in the Manchester derby on 9 October 1974, coming on for Glyn Pardoe in a 1–0 defeat to Manchester United at Old Trafford in the League Cup. Manager Tony Book surmised that: "the handful of things which Peter did were carried out properly and effectively". Barnes made his First Division debut four days later, following an injury to Rodney Marsh, starting in a 2–1 defeat at Burnley. He made his Maine Road debut the following week, standing in for the injured Dennis Tueart in a 1–0 win over Luton Town, and missed an easy chance to score a goal after "spooning a ball from Bell over the top from less than 6 yards (5.5 m) with the entire goal gaping". He scored his first career goal on 19 March 1975, converting a knee-high volley in a 2–1 loss to Carlisle United; this was his only goal from five appearances in the 1974–75 season.

Barnes had to wait until 8 October to make his first appearance of the 1975–76 campaign, filling in for the injured Tueart in a 2–1 home victory over Nottingham Forest in the League Cup. Book then dropped captain Marsh from the first-team and transfer-listed him, which left a space for Barnes in the starting eleven as Asa Hartford was given Marsh's number ten shirt. Barnes scored his first goal of the campaign from what Book described as "virtually very little" in a 2–2 draw at Sheffield United; the draw had been hard-earned after the team coach crashed on the journey to the ground, causing whiplash injuries to some City players. Nottingham Football Post columnist Ron Fenton wrote that: "Peter Barnes and Dennis Tueart have consistently destroyed defences this season with thrilling wing play... [and] have done the game a big service ... to accelerate the re-birth of wingers". Barnes' run of twelve consecutive league starts was ended after he suffered a cracked collarbone following a collision with Frank Gray during a 1–0 home defeat to Leeds United on Boxing Day. Barnes ended the season with five goals in 36 appearances, including 27 league starts.

Of more significance in the 1975–76 season was the club's League Cup campaign which saw them reach the final by eliminating Norwich City (after two replays), Nottingham Forest, Manchester United, Mansfield Town and Middlesbrough (against whom Barnes scored a goal and provided an assist) to reach the final, where they faced Newcastle United at Wembley Stadium. Barnes scored the opening goal of the match on 11 minutes with a half-volley after captain Mike Doyle headed a free kick into his path; it was part of a routine that had been practised on the training ground. Manchester City went on to win the match 2–1, with Tueart scoring the winning goal shortly after half-time. Hugh McIlvanney wrote that Barnes was an "ebullient, highly-skilled newcomer to Wembley" and that for his goal the ball "bounced awkwardly, but he used his left foot to come down on it with killing economy, and it went swiftly inside the goalkeeper's left-hand post". The day after the cup final, Barnes was voted Young Player of the Year by the Professional Footballers' Association. He fluffed his acceptance speech due to his shyness and fear of public speaking as he froze and was unable to speak.

With Bell facing a long-term injury, Book signed veteran forward Brian Kidd and Irish right-sided midfielder Jimmy Conway to add experience to the side. Barnes was left out of the squad for the opening match of the 1976–77 season. An impressive goal against Bristol City helped him to force his way into the side for the opening match of the UEFA Cup campaign against Juventus. He was substituted after being injured by Juventus defender Claudio Gentile, who stamped his studs through Barnes's shoe to damage his foot. The injury caused him to miss the second leg, which Juventus won on their way to the final. Conway picked up an injury during his absence, and Barnes returned to the starting eleven upon his return to fitness.

Barnes aggravated the foot injury against West Ham United, and was left on the bench for much of the rest of the 1976–77 campaign. It was only after the Manchester derby match in March that he had an extended run in the team as City made a push for the league title. He provided the assist for David Watson in a 2–1 win over title rivals Ipswich Town. However, he was dropped for the crucial match with Liverpool, erstwhile stand-in Paul Power taking his place on the wing as Book went with the game plan of stifling Liverpool; Barnes came on as a substitute and provided the assist for Kidd's equaliser, though Liverpool quickly regained the lead and won the match 2–1. Three straight wins revived City's title hopes, but a 4–0 loss at Derby County and a 1–1 draw with Aston Villa saw them end the season in second-place, one point behind Liverpool.

"A potentially world-class player superbly living up to that reputation with a breathtaking display of wing power that was a throwback to the days of Matthews and Finney".

— A description of Barnes in the Manchester Evening News following his performance in a match against Chelsea on 28 November 1977.

==== An established first-team presence: 1977–78 ====
Barnes was again relegated to the bench for the opening match of the 1977–78 season after Book signed Mick Channon from Southampton for £300,000. Channon scored his first goals for the club on Barnes's first start of the season, a 4–0 win over Norwich City on 3 September. City were back in the UEFA Cup and both Barnes and Channon scored in a 2–2 draw with Widzew Łódź in the first round. However, City were eliminated on the away goals rule. Despite the disappointment in Europe, City were top of the First Division at the start of October in what was a short-lived title campaign that tailed off into a fourth-place finish. Barnes managed to score impressive goals against Bristol City and Arsenal, beating three players en route to goal against Bristol City and chipping over Pat Jennings against Arsenal. He started 33 league matches that season, playing 45 times in total and scoring 11 goals. Dutch club PSV Eindhoven made a bid for Barnes shortly before their appearance in the 1978 UEFA Cup final, but fell short of Manchester City chairman Peter Swales's £750,000 valuation.

==== Disappointing final season: 1978–79 ====
Book continued to be reticent in playing Barnes during the 1978–79 season, but he angrily dismissed claims that there was a growing rift between player and club as "the age-old press gimmick of stirring up the waters". Barnes was praised for his performances in the UEFA Cup, with Peter Gardner of the Manchester Evening Guardian commenting that he was "at his brilliant best" by "twisting, turning, tormenting and teasing the harassed Belgians" in a 4–0 win over Standard Liège in the second round first leg. Standard Liège manager Robert Waseige labelled him as a "world-class player" after the match. City overcame Milan in the next round despite Barnes missing the leg at the San Siro and reports being leaked to the press of a £1.5 million transfer bid from Milan's Serie A rivals Juventus. Results in the league were poor for City and Swales acted by assigning Book with an unwanted assistant in former City boss Malcolm Allison. Barnes later reflected that following Allison's arrival "things were different and our mood changed, the mood just wasn't right... I felt my days were numbered".

City were knocked out of the FA Cup by Third Division Shrewsbury Town and exited the UEFA Cup at the quarter-finals following defeat by Borussia Mönchengladbach, all whilst slipping to a 15th-place finish in the First Division – the club's lowest league finish since 1967. Barnes was dropped from the team and transfer-listed in March. Barnes told Book that he wanted to stay at the club but later reflected: "I'm sure he wanted me to stay but I don't think he had the final decision". Liverpool made an offer of £650,000 which, despite being £200,000 more than they paid for club record signing Kenny Dalglish, still fell £100,000 short of City's valuation. Manchester United met the valuation but, as they were local rivals, were told they must pay £1 million or £750,000 plus Steve Coppell.

=== West Bromwich Albion ===
On 17 July 1979, Barnes joined West Bromwich Albion for a fee of £748,000 – a club transfer record that was not broken until Kevin Kilbane's arrival in June 1997. Barnes was signed to replace Laurie Cunningham, who had recently been sold to Real Madrid. Six weeks previously, manager Ron Atkinson had signed Gary Owen, a close friend and teammate of Barnes at Manchester City, for £450,000. Cyrille Regis was injured at the start of the season, and the "Baggies" picked up only one point from the first four First Division fixtures of the 1979–80 season, though Barnes did open his goal scoring account with a consolation strike in a 3–1 defeat to Liverpool at Anfield. He again played in the UEFA Cup, but Albion were eliminated in the first round by Carl Zeiss Jena. Barnes struggled for form and felt homesick, but scored two goals and provided an assist for Owen to score the third in a 3–0 win over Bristol City at The Hawthorns in December. He scored twice at former club Manchester City as part of a run of eight goals in six First Division matches, four of which came from penalty kicks. West Brom improved in the second half of the campaign to finish in tenth place, with Barnes as the club's leading scorer after scoring a career-high 15 goals from 38 league appearances, a ratio of 0.395 goals per match.

Barnes enjoyed Atkinson's attacking brand of football and felt happy at the club despite missing his hometown and becoming unsettled after his house was robbed. West Brom started the 1980–81 season strongly after recovering from a defeat by Arsenal on the opening day. On 27 December, The People reported that Barnes "scored one and set up another for smash-and-grab Albion" in a 3–1 victory over Manchester United. Assistant manager Mick Brown spoke after the match to say: "He is an entertainer. The crowds go away either loving or hating him, but they all talk about him during the week". According to reports, Barnes put in a transfer request towards the end of the campaign, but it was refused by Atkinson. Barnes scored ten goals in 47 appearances, helping Albion to qualify for European football with a fourth-place finish. Manchester City tried to re-sign Barnes, but manager John Bond had his offer of player-exchanges rejected by Albion. Atkinson's departure for the Manchester United management position helped to accelerate Barnes' exit from the club as he "just couldn't hit it off" with new manager Ronnie Allen.

=== Leeds United ===
Barnes signed for Leeds United for £750,000 plus £180,000 "tariffs"; this was a club record that was not broken until John Lukic arrived in May 1990. The signing of Barnes was seen as an odd move as Leeds already had good quality wingers in Carl Harris and Arthur Graham, which caused manager Allan Clarke to play him out of position in deep midfield. A 5–1 defeat at newly-promoted Swansea City on the opening day of the 1981–82 season was an indication of things to come for the "Whites". Speaking after a 4–0 defeat by Coventry City, Leeds assistant manager Martin Wilkinson remarked that: "We are not asking Peter to run his blood to water, but we do want to see him get a bit of a sweat occasionally". Barnes in turn spoke of his regret at leaving West Bromwich Albion, leading Clarke to issue him with a £750 fine for making disparaging remarks about Leeds. Clarke lacked a reliable striker at Elland Road and decided to play Barnes at centre-forward. Leeds needed to beat West Bromwich Albion on the final day of the season to avoid relegation into the Second Division, but defeat saw Leeds relegated at The Hawthorns. Clarke was sacked. His replacement, Eddie Gray, informed Barnes that he would have to take a pay cut or be sold on. Barnes was expected to leave Leeds, but the high figures in the transfer market had collapsed following a Football League ruling that clubs must pay at least 50% of any transfer fee up front, with the remaining 50% settled within a year.

=== Real Betis ===
Barnes moved to Spain to play for Real Betis, having been purchased for £300,000 and retaining the option to return to Leeds after a year if he failed to settle in Seville. However, he was again played out of position at centre-forward as Betis already had an attacking left-wingback in Spain international Rafael Gordillo. Manager Antal Dunai was reluctant to play Barnes as the Englishman could not speak Spanish and Dunai admitted that he had not seen Barnes play before he was brought to the Benito Villamarín. Dunai was replaced by Marcel Domingo, who led Betis to an 11th-place finish in La Liga. Barnes struggled to settle in Spain, despite picking up some of the Spanish language, and wanted to move his young family back to England. He made 16 league appearances in the 1982–83 season, scoring one goal against eventual champions Athletic Bilbao.

=== Return to Leeds United ===
Barnes took up the option of returning to play for Leeds United, turning down a £200,000 move to First Division Watford as he wanted to settle back in the North of England. He missed the start of the 1983–84 season with a groin injury, but soon won plaudits after helping the team put together an eight-match unbeaten run. He scored four goals from 25 league starts and two substitute appearances as Leeds finished tenth in the Second Division. He joined Manchester United on loan for an end-of-season tour under his former West Brom manager Ron Atkinson.

=== Coventry City ===
Barnes joined Coventry City in October 1984 for a reported fee of £65,000. He made a positive impression on his debut at Watford on 6 October, his first appearance in the First Division for three years, leading manager Bobby Gould to comment that "you don't lose that kind of ability in three years". After Gould was sacked in December, he was succeeded by his assistant Don Mackay who dropped Barnes to the reserve team and replaced him with Micky Adams to implement more defensive tactics. Barnes scored two goals in 19 first-team matches for the "Sky Blues" in the 1984–85 season.

=== Manchester United ===
In July 1985, Ron Atkinson signed Barnes for Manchester United for a fee of £30,000 to compete with Denmark international winger Jesper Olsen on the left-wing; Gordon Strachan was established on the right-wing. This left Barnes with limited first-team opportunities, but it meant when selected that he could play in his preferred position in an attacking team. He was an unused substitute in the 1985 FA Charity Shield defeat by Everton at Wembley Stadium. He scored on his debut for the "Red Devils", in a 3–1 victory at Nottingham Forest on 31 August, when Olsen was out injured with damaged ligaments. United were at the top of the table. Barnes was named as the Daily Mirror's Player of the Month for September after the newspaper reported that he was "stunning... sensational" as the "Old Trafford machine left the rest of the First Division trailing in their slipstream". Barnes retained his place when Olsen returned, as Atkinson chose to play Olsen at inside-forward. Barnes himself was side-lined after he sustained a calf injury during a man of the match performance in a 0–0 draw with Tottenham Hotspur on 16 November. A series of injuries to other players hampered United's title challenge. Barnes returned in January, playing for the reserve team. He failed to dislodge new signing Colin Gibson as Atkinson reverted to more defensive tactics and ended the 1985–86 season with two goals in 18 matches as United finished fourth.

Barnes had to wait until 7 October to make his first appearance of the 1986–87 season, when he scored in a 5–2 League Cup win at Port Vale. He retained his place until Atkinson was dismissed on 4 November. Barnes played in the first four league matches of new manager Alex Ferguson's tenure but was dropped after a 1–0 defeat at Wimbledon. Barnes once hid in the communal bath waters in the dressing room to avoid Ferguson's famed 'hair-dryer' treatment.

=== Later career ===
Barnes returned to Manchester City on 13 January 1987 after manager Jimmy Frizzell authorised a £20,000 transfer. He played in eight First Division matches for the "Citizens" in the second half of the 1986–87 season, and also scored eight goals in 13 matches for the reserves. City were relegated to the Second Division and Mel Machin replaced Frizzell as manager. Barnes started the 1987–88 season playing in the reserves and made his final appearance for the first-team, coming on for Paul Simpson 73 minutes into a 2–1 defeat by Wolverhampton Wanderers in the League Cup. On 8 October 1987, Barnes was loaned out to Bolton Wanderers in the Fourth Division, where manager Phil Neal said that "he will play eight games for us in his loan period, and if he performs as I know he can, I will do everything to keep him". However, Barnes was injured just ten seconds into his home debut at Burnden Park and the loan spell was cut short after just two weeks. He played three Third Division matches on loan at John Rudge's Port Vale in December. However, Machin refused permission for him to play for the "Valiants" in the FA Cup third round tie with Macclesfield Town at Vale Park on 10 January 1988. Barnes ended the 1987–88 season by playing in eleven Second Division matches for Hull City after being signed on a free transfer by manager Brian Horton.

Barnes made his final appearance in the Football League on 18 February 1989, playing for Sunderland in a 4–1 defeat at Swindon Town. Manager Denis Smith commented that Barnes had "impressed our coaches with his attitude so far in training", but otherwise restricted him to appearances for the reserves. In March 1990, Barnes was invited to train the youth team at Stockport County by manager Danny Bergara, but decided to try and continue his playing career. He scored four goals in seven matches in the Maltese Premier League for Hamrun Spartans in 1992, flying to and from Malta for matches only during his three-month stay. He was briefly at Bury, but was not given a game by manager Sam Ellis in his month-long stay. He left Gigg Lane and played three League of Ireland Premier Division matches for Drogheda United. In April 1990, he was invited to sign for the Tampa Bay Rowdies of the American Professional Soccer League by former Manchester City teammate Rodney Marsh. He scored one goal in eleven matches as the Rowdies finished second in the Southern Division of the Eastern Conference, before returning to England after six months in the United States. He later played for Stafford Rangers, where his father had started his career, and played for Mossley following an invite from Eric Webster. His career came to an end in 1993 following brief spells at Northwich Victoria, Wrexham, Radcliffe Borough, Mossley and Cliftonville.

== International career ==
Barnes was selected by Ken Burton for the England youth team in the Atlantic International Tournament in the Canary Islands in January 1975 and played all three matches against Poland, West Germany and Las Palmas; England won the tournament and it was reported that his "juggling skills had the Canary Islanders raving". He was selected for the 1975 UEFA European Under-18 Championship in Switzerland, having played in the first leg of the qualification tie with Spain. He played in the three group matches against Northern Ireland, Republic of Ireland and Switzerland, and scored the only goal of the match against the Republic. England overcame Hungary in the semi-finals and won the tournament with Ray Wilkins scoring the only goal of the final against Finland at the Wankdorf Stadium.

Barnes made his debut for the England under-21 team as a substitute in a 0–0 draw with Wales in December 1976, coming on as a 70th-minute substitute for David Fairclough. He started the next seven England under-21 matches, scoring his first goal against Norway in Bergen on 1 June 1977; he won praise from journalists as the outstanding player in the match. The victory over Norway helped England to qualify from their group at the 1978 UEFA European Under-21 Championship, and he played in both legs of England's quarter-final victory over Italy, making his last appearance for the under-21s on 2 May 1978 in a 1–1 draw with Yugoslavia in the semi-finals; Yugoslavia won the tie 3–2 on aggregate.

Barnes made his full England debut at Wembley on 16 November 1977, in a 2–0 win over Italy. Manager Ron Greenwood also gave first caps to right-winger Steve Coppell and centre-forward Bob Latchford in the match, saying that "their inexperience did not worry me because I thought they had the right qualities and character for the job". The Italians qualified ahead of England for the 1978 FIFA World Cup after having already all but secured top spot in the group with five convincing victories. Barnes won a second cap against West Germany on 22 February 1978, with journalist Bob Harris reporting that he "gave the experienced Berti Vogts a harrowing time" despite England losing the friendly 2–1. Barnes scored against Wales in a 3–1 away win in the 1978 British Home Championship and against Scotland in the following year, with England claiming both British Home Championship titles.

Barnes went on to play in five of England's eight qualifying matches for the 1980 European Championships, scoring in a 3–0 win over Bulgaria at the Vasil Levski National Stadium. However, he was not selected for the tournament itself. He played in two qualifying matches for the 1982 FIFA World Cup, defeats to Norway and Switzerland, but was again not selected for the tournament itself after being culled from the forty-man provisional squad. Barnes played his last international match on 25 May 1982, in a friendly against the Netherlands. He won a total of 22 caps, scoring four international goals, and also represented the England B team. His father felt that the success of Alf Ramsey's "wingless wonders" in the 1966 FIFA World Cup held his son back as the trend for England to play without wingers continued for many years after the initial success. Barnes came close to being selected by Bobby Robson before he was injured in 1985. Robson described him as the "next choice winger" after choosing Chris Waddle instead.

== Style of play ==
Barnes was naturally left-footed but was able to play with either foot. His main strengths were his pace, dribbling ability and crossing. Don Revie assessed his style by saying: "He is very quick and well balanced and what impresses me as much as anything is the way he takes on defenders. The usual pattern nowadays is for a winger to draw his defender. This boy takes the ball up to them – makes them commit themselves and is brave enough to take anybody on". Barnes was described as a rare "all out attacking" winger by Manchester United defender Jimmy Nicholl.

== Personal and later life ==
Barnes' father, Ken also played football for Manchester City, winning the FA Cup in 1956, and later worked as the club's chief scout. Ken and Jean Barnes had a total of five children: daughters Susan and Diane and sons Keith, Peter and Michael. Keith had a month-long trial at Manchester United, and Michael represented England at schoolboy level, though neither became professional footballers.

Barnes married Alison Garrathy on 10 September 1980. He withdrew from the England squad to play against Norway to get married. They have two daughters: Eloise and Jessica. The marriage ended in divorce in the 1990s; and Alison took the children to live in Italy.

Barnes wrote a column in Shoot magazine for a short time starting in October 1978 and also lent his name to a football training aid. After his playing career finished, he was invited by Steve Fleet to coach community groups at Manchester City. He was given a part-time job managing Conference club Runcorn mid-way through the 1995–96 season and asked Mike Lester to assist him. He was sacked after a new chairman took control of the club in March 1996.

Barnes went on to take jobs selling insurance and mortgages. He was a pub manager at Manchester City's Social Club for six months and then spent seven years working for a firm that sold AstroTurf pitches and five years at a company that cleared contaminated land. He also worked as an analyst for Key 103 Radio and BBC Radio Manchester. Jason Dasey hired Barnes as a Premier League pundit for Astro's thrice-weekly FourFourTwo television programme in Malaysia in August 2010. An authorised biography was published in 2021, written by Manchester City supporting football writer Gary Jones.

== Career statistics ==
=== Club ===
Appearances and goals by club, season and competition
| Club | Season | League | | | FA Cup | | Other | | Total | |
| Club | Season | Division | Apps | Goals | Apps | Goals | Apps | Goals | Apps | Goals |
|---|---|---|---|---|---|---|---|---|---|---|
| Manchester City | 1974–75 | First Division | 3 | 1 | 1 | 0 | 1 | 0 | 5 | 1 |
| Manchester City | 1975–76 | First Division | 28 | 3 | 1 | 0 | 7 | 2 | 36 | 5 |
| Manchester City | 1976–77 | First Division | 21 | 2 | 0 | 0 | 2 | 0 | 23 | 2 |
| Manchester City | 1977–78 | First Division | 34 | 8 | 2 | 1 | 9 | 2 | 45 | 11 |
| Manchester City | 1978–79 | First Division | 29 | 1 | 3 | 1 | 10 | 1 | 43 | 3 |
| Manchester City | Total | | 115 | 15 | 7 | 2 | 29 | 5 | 151 | 22 |
| West Bromwich Albion | 1979–80 | First Division | 38 | 15 | 2 | 0 | 5 | 0 | 45 | 15 |
| West Bromwich Albion | 1980–81 | First Division | 39 | 8 | 2 | 1 | 6 | 1 | 47 | 10 |
| West Bromwich Albion | Total | | 77 | 23 | 4 | 1 | 11 | 1 | 92 | 25 |
| Leeds United | 1981–82 | First Division | 31 | 1 | 0 | 0 | 2 | 0 | 33 | 1 |
| Real Betis | 1982–83 | La Liga | 16 | 1 | | | | | 16 | 1 |
| Leeds United | 1983–84 | Second Division | 27 | 4 | 1 | 0 | 3 | 1 | 31 | 5 |
| Coventry City | 1984–85 | First Division | 18 | 2 | 0 | 0 | 1 | 0 | 19 | 2 |
| Manchester United | 1985–86 | First Division | 13 | 2 | 0 | 0 | 5 | 1 | 18 | 3 |
| Manchester United | 1986–87 | First Division | 7 | 0 | 0 | 0 | 2 | 1 | 9 | 1 |
| Manchester United | Total | | 20 | 2 | 0 | 0 | 7 | 2 | 27 | 4 |
| Manchester City | 1986–87 | First Division | 8 | 0 | 0 | 0 | 1 | 0 | 9 | 0 |
| Manchester City | 1987–88 | Second Division | 0 | 0 | 0 | 0 | 1 | 0 | 1 | 0 |
| Manchester City | Total | | 8 | 0 | 0 | 0 | 2 | 0 | 10 | 0 |
| Bolton Wanderers (loan) | 1987–88 | Fourth Division | 2 | 0 | 0 | 0 | 0 | 0 | 2 | 0 |
| Port Vale (loan) | 1987–88 | Third Division | 3 | 0 | 0 | 0 | 0 | 0 | 3 | 0 |
| Hull City | 1987–88 | Second Division | 11 | 0 | 0 | 0 | 0 | 0 | 11 | 0 |
| Farense | 1988–89 | Primeira Divisão | 1 | 0 | | | | | 1 | 0 |
| Bolton Wanderers | 1988–89 | Third Division | 3 | 0 | 1 | 0 | 0 | 0 | 4 | 0 |
| Sunderland | 1988–89 | Second Division | 1 | 0 | 0 | 0 | 0 | 0 | 1 | 0 |
| Footscray JUST | 1989 | National Soccer League | 2 | 0 | | | | | 2 | 0 |
| Hamrun Spartans | 1989–90 | Maltese Premier League | 7 | 4 | 0 | 0 | 0 | 0 | 7 | 4 |
| Bury | 1989–90 | Third Division | 0 | 0 | 0 | 0 | 1 | 0 | 1 | 0 |
| Drogheda United | 1989–90 | League of Ireland; Premier Division | 3 | 0 | | | | | 3 | 0 |
| Tampa Bay Rowdies | 1990 | American Professional; Soccer League | 11 | 1 | | | | | 11 | 1 |
| Stafford Rangers | 1990–91 | Conference | 5 | 0 | | | | | 5 | 0 |
| Northwich Victoria | 1990–91 | Conference | 7 | 0 | | | | | 7 | 0 |
| Wrexham | 1991–92 | Fourth Division | 0 | 0 | 0 | 0 | 0 | 0 | 0 | 0 |
| Mossley | 1991–92 | Northern Premier League; Premier Division | 8 | 0 | | | | | 8 | 0 |
| Cliftonville | 1991–92 | Irish League | 1 | 0 | | | | | 1 | 0 |
| Career total | | | 377 | 53 | 13 | 3 | 56 | 9 | 446 | 65 |

=== International ===
Appearances and goals by national team and year
| National team | Year | Apps | Goals |
|---|---|---|---|
| England | 1977 | 1 | 0 |
| England | 1978 | 8 | 2 |
| England | 1979 | 6 | 2 |
| England | 1980 | 1 | 0 |
| England | 1981 | 5 | 0 |
| England | 1982 | 1 | 0 |
| Total | | 22 | 4 |

== Honours ==
Manchester City

- Football League Cup: 1975–76

Manchester United

- FA Charity Shield runner-up: 1985

England Youth

- UEFA European Under-19 Championship: 1975

England

- British Home Championship: 1977–78, 1978–79

Individual

- PFA Young Player of the Year: 1976

== Bibliography ==
- Jones, Gary (2021). The Peter Barnes Authorised Biography: On a Wing and a Prayer. James Ward. ISBN 978-1-9168852-0-2.
