= Joe Corrigan =

English footballer (born 1948)

Joe Corrigan MBE
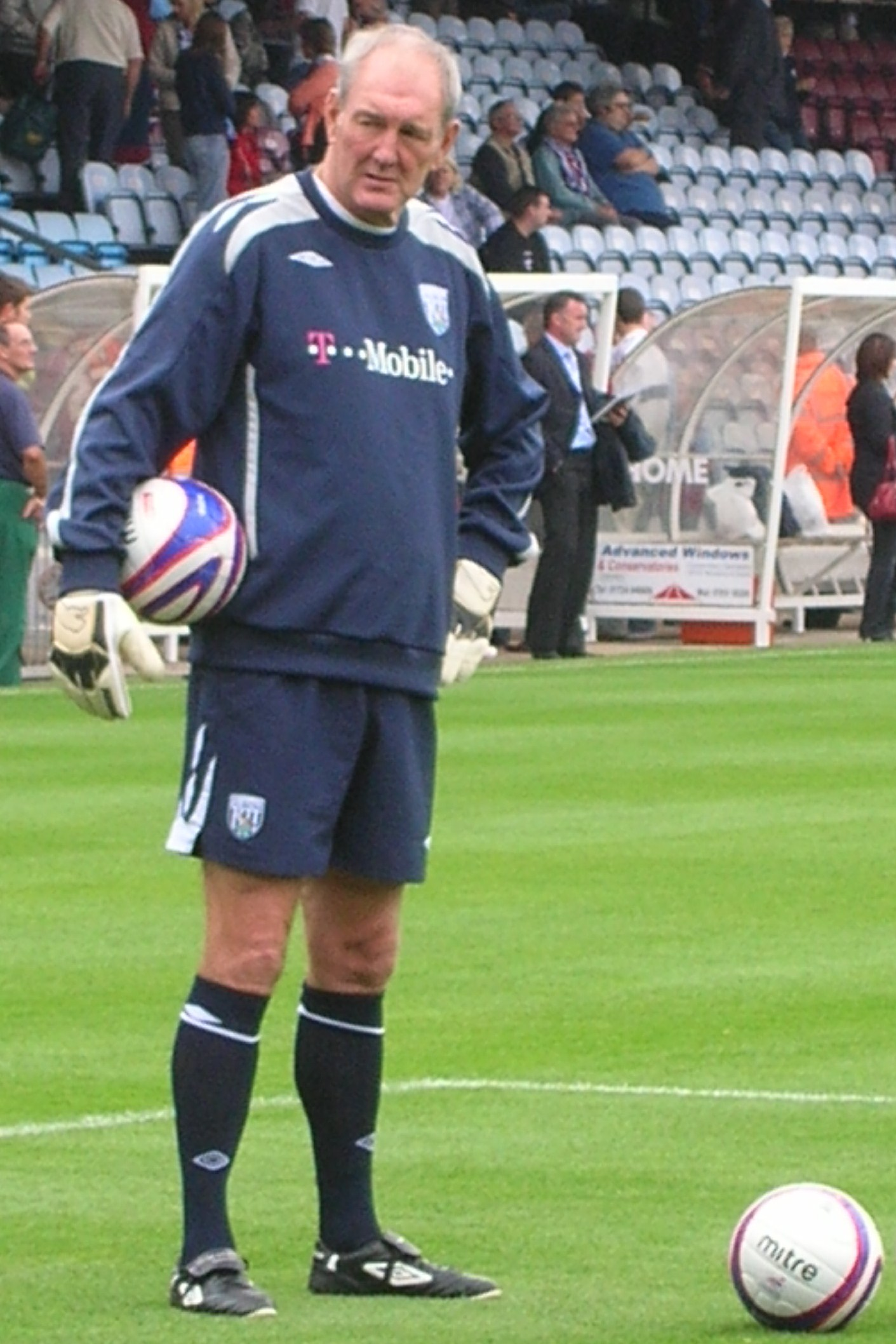
- Corrigan coaching West Bromwich Albion goalkeepers in 2007

Personal information
- Full name: Joseph Thomas Corrigan
- Date of birth: 18 November 1948 (age 77)
- Place of birth: Manchester, England
- Position: Goalkeeper

Youth career
- Sale Grammar School
- Manchester City

Senior career*
Years	Team	Apps	(Gls)
1967–1983	Manchester City	476	(0)
1983	Seattle Sounders	29	(0)
1983–1984	Brighton & Hove Albion	36	(0)
1984	→ Norwich City (loan)	3	(0)
1984	→ Stoke City (loan)	9	(0)
Total		553	(0)

International career
1969	England U23	1	(0)
1978	England U21	3	(0)
1978–1981	England B	10	(0)
1976–1982	England	9	(0)
- * Club domestic league appearances and goals

Joseph Thomas Corrigan MBE (born 18 November 1948) is an English former professional footballer who played as a goalkeeper in the Football League for Manchester City, Brighton & Hove Albion, Norwich City and Stoke City as well as the England national team.

Corrigan began his career at Manchester City making his professional debut in 1967. In the 1969–70 season, he established himself as the first choice keeper at Maine Road, taking over from the ageing Harry Dowd. He spent 16 seasons at Manchester City, winning the UEFA Cup Winners' Cup and League Cup twice, while also earning nine England caps. He left in 1983 to play for the North American Soccer League's Seattle Sounders, then returned to England for spells with Brighton & Hove Albion, Norwich City and Stoke City. A neck injury forced him to retire in 1985.

== Playing career ==
Corrigan joined Manchester City as a youth player in 1966. He made his debut in 1967, in a League Cup match against Blackpool. Corrigan was an understudy to Harry Dowd in City's 1969 FA Cup win. Corrigan then established himself in the first team during the 1969–70 season, and was part of the Manchester City team which won a cup double of the UEFA Cup Winners' Cup and the League Cup. He was also a member of the 1976 League Cup winning side. His debut appearance for England came on 28 May 1976 against Italy, the first of a total of 9 caps, and he was part of the England squad for the 1982 FIFA World Cup. He would undoubtedly have played more times for England if his chances had not been limited by Peter Shilton and Ray Clemence. Corrigan also appeared for Manchester City in the 1981 FA Cup final defeat by Tottenham Hotspur where he was named as man-of-the match. In total Corrigan made 592 appearances for Manchester City, a figure beaten only by Alan Oakes, and a club record for a goalkeeper. He also won Manchester City's Player of the Year award three times, a feat matched only by Richard Dunne. He is remembered as one of Manchester City's best goalkeepers along with Frank Swift and Bert Trautmann.

Corrigan was sold in 1983 to American club Seattle Sounders for £30,000. Corrigan stayed in the US only a few months, making 29 appearances before returning to England with Brighton. At the end of his career he also had spells on loan at Stoke City and Norwich.

== Coaching career ==
After retiring from football, Joe Corrigan was the Goalkeeping Coach at Liverpool from 1994 until the arrival of Rafael Benítez in 2004. On 21 September 2004, Corrigan joined the coaching team at Chester City but moved to become goalkeeping coach at Stockport County on 5 October 2004. In February 2005, Corrigan joined West Bromwich Albion. Joe Corrigan retired at the end of the 2008–09 season.

In February 2011 Corrigan came out of retirement to join Hull City as goalkeeping coach, replacing Mark Prudhoe, who had been criticised by some Hull supporters for his coaching methods. Corrigan left his coaching role at Hull City in August 2011 after being involved in an unspecified incident with Jimmy Bullard on a pre season trip to Slovenia, the latter being sacked as a result.

== International career ==
Born in England, Corrigan is of Irish descent. He played for the England national team 9 times between 1976 and 1982.

== Personal life ==
Corrigan was appointed a Member of the Order of the British Empire (MBE) in 2025 New Year Honours for services to Charitable Fundraising.

== Career statistics ==
=== Club ===
Appearances and goals by club, season and competition
Club	Season	League			FA Cup		League Cup		Other (Note: Appearances in the Anglo-Italian Cup, Anglo-Scottish Cup, FA Charity Shield, Texaco Cup, UEFA Cup and UEFA Cup Winners' Cup)		Total	
Club	Season	Division	Apps	Goals	Apps	Goals	Apps	Goals	Apps	Goals	Apps	Goals
Manchester City	1967–68	First Division	0	0	0	0	2	0	0	0	2	0
Manchester City	1968–69	First Division	4	0	0	0	0	0	0	0	4	0
Manchester City	1969–70	First Division	34	0	1	0	7	0	8	0	50	0
Manchester City	1970–71	First Division	33	0	3	0	1	0	8	0	45	0
Manchester City	1971–72	First Division	35	0	2	0	2	0	1	0	40	0
Manchester City	1972–73	First Division	30	0	5	0	1	0	2	0	38	0
Manchester City	1973–74	First Division	15	0	1	0	0	0	1	0	17	0
Manchester City	1974–75	First Division	15	0	1	0	0	0	2	0	18	0
Manchester City	1975–76	First Division	41	0	2	0	9	0	3	0	55	0
Manchester City	1976–77	First Division	42	0	4	0	1	0	2	0	49	0
Manchester City	1977–78	First Division	42	0	2	0	7	0	2	0	53	0
Manchester City	1978–79	First Division	42	0	2	0	5	0	8	0	57	0
Manchester City	1979–80	First Division	42	0	1	0	4	0	0	0	47	0
Manchester City	1980–81	First Division	37	0	8	0	6	0	0	0	51	0
Manchester City	1981–82	First Division	39	0	2	0	4	0	0	0	45	0
Manchester City	1982–83	First Division	25	0	3	0	3	0	0	0	31	0
Manchester City	Total		476	0	37	0	52	0	37	0	602	0
Seattle Sounders	1983	NASL	29	0	–		–		–		29	0
Brighton & Hove Albion	1983–84	Second Division	36	0	3	0	3	0	0	0	42	0
Norwich City (loan)	1984–85	First Division	3	0	0	0	1	0	0	0	4	0
Stoke City (loan)	1984–85	First Division	9	0	0	0	0	0	0	0	9	0
Career total			553	0	40	0	56	0	37	0	686	0

=== International ===
Appearances and goals by national team and year
National team	Year	Apps	Goals
England	1976	1	0
England	1977	0	0
England	1978	1	0
England	1979	1	0
England	1980	2	0
England	1981	2	0
England	1982	2	0
Total		9	0

== Honours ==
Manchester City

- Football League Cup: 1969–70, 1975–76
- FA Charity Shield: 1972
- UEFA Cup Winners' Cup: 1969–70
- FA Cup runner-up: 1980–81

Individual

- Manchester City Player of the Year: 1976, 1978, 1980
