= 1988–89 Bolton Wanderers F.C. season =

Bolton Wanderers
1988–89 season
- Manager: Phil Neal
- Stadium: Burnden Park
- Third Division: 10th
- FA Cup: 2nd Round
- Littlewoods Cup: 1st Round
- Sherpa Van Trophy: Winners
- Top goalscorer: League: Trevor Morgan (10); All: Trevor Morgan; Steve Thompson (11)
- Highest home attendance: 10,345 v Blackpool; 11 April 1989
- Lowest home attendance: 2,695 v Preston North End; 6 December 1988

The 1988–1989 season was the 110th season in Bolton Wanderers F.C.'s existence, and their first season back in the Football League Third Division following promotion from the Football League Fourth Division. It covers the period from 1 July 1988 to 30 June 1989.

== Results ==
=== Football League Division Three ===
Date	Opponents	H / A	Result F–A	Scorers	Attendance
27 August 1988	Southend United	A	0–2		4,075
3 September 1988	Cardiff City	H	4–0	Thomas, Henshaw, Darby (2)	4,831
10 September 1988	Reading	A	1–1	Thomas	4,660
17 September 1988	Bristol Rovers	H	1–1	Brown	4,821
27 September 1988	Fulham	H	3–2	Savage, Thompson, Morgan	4,289
24 September 1988	Aldershot Town	A	3–0	Stevens, Brookman	2,127
1 October 1988	Sheffield United	H	2–0	Thompson (2) (1pen)	9,345
4 October 1988	Swansea City	A	0–1		3,283
8 October 1988	Blackpool	H	2–2	Morgan, Thompson (pen)	7,106
15 October 1988	Port Vale	A	1–2	Brookman	7,985
22 October 1988	Wolverhampton Wanderers	H	1–2	Morgan	8,174
25 October 1988	Wigan Athletic	A	1–1	Brookman	4,438
29 October 1988	Chesterfield	H	5–0	Brown (2), Morgan (2), Stevens	4,783
5 November 1988	Bristol City	A	1–1	Morgan	8,808
8 November 1988	Huddersfield Town	A	1–0	Morgan	7,802
12 November 1988	Bury	H	2–4	Brown, Thompson	7,897
26 November 1988	Northampton Town	H	2–1	Stevens, Brookman	4,446
3 December 1988	Brentford	A	0–3		4,600
17 December 1988	Chester City	H	0–1		4,318
26 December 1988	Preston North End	A	1–3	Savage	12,124
31 December 1988	Notts County	A	0–2		5,096
2 January 1989	Mansfield Town	H	0–0		4,936
6 January 1989	Gillingham	H	2–1	Stevens, Thompson	4,178
14 January 1989	Cardiff City	A	0–1		4,212
21 January 1989	Reading	H	1–1	Henshaw	5,172
28 January 1989	Bristol Rovers	A	0–2		5,311
4 February 1989	Sheffield United	A	0–4		11,162
11 February 1989	Swansea City	H	1–0	Savage	4,178
18 February 1989	Blackpool	A	0–2		5,552
4 March 1989	Wolverhampton Wanderers	A	0–1		13,521
11 March 1989	Bristol City	H	2–0	Darby (2)	4,423
14 March 1989	Chesterfield	A	1–1	Thompson	2,877
18 March 1989	Southend United	H	0–0		3,505
25 March 1989	Mansfield Town	A	1–1	Savage	3,256
27 March 1989	Preston North End	H	1–0	Thompson	10,281
1 April 1989	Chester City	A	0–0		3,225
4 April 1988	Gillngham	A	1–0	Thomas	3,096
8 April 1989	Notts County	H	3–3	Thomas, Thompson, Morgan	4,521
15 April 1989	Fulham	A	1–1	Morgan	4,950
22 April 1989	Aldershot Town	H	1–0	Savage	4,407
25 April 1989	Port Vale	H	1–1	Chandler	5,296
29 April 1989	Bury	A	0–0		4,393
1 May 1989	Huddersfield Town	H	3–1	Chandler, Morgan, Thomas	5,511
6 May 1989	Brentford	H	4–2	Thomas (2), Darby, Savage	4,627
1 May 1989	Wigan Athletic	H	1–1	Storer	6,166
13 May 1989	Northampton Town	A	3–2	Thomas (2), Stuart Storer	3,655

Pos	Team	Pld	W	D	L	GF	GA	GD	Pts	Promotion or relegation
8	Chester City	46	19	11	16	64	61	+3	68	
9	Notts County	46	18	13	15	64	54	+10	67	
10	Bolton Wanderers	46	16	16	14	58	54	+4	64	
11	Bristol City	46	18	9	19	53	55	−2	63	
12	Swansea City	46	15	16	15	51	53	−2	61	Qualification for the European Cup Winners' Cup first round

=== FA Cup ===
Date	Round	Opponents	H / A	Result F–A	Scorers	Attendance
19 November 1988	Round 1	Chesterfield	H	0–0		4,840
28 November 1988	Round 1 replay	Chesterfield	A	3–2	Stevens, Storer, Darby	4,168
10 December 1988	Round 2	Port Vale	H	1–2	Keeley	7,499

=== Littlewoods Cup ===
Date	Round	Opponents	H / A	Result F–A	Scorers	Attendance
30 August 1988	Round 1 First Leg	Chester City	H	1–0	Darby	3,535
7 September 1988	Round 1 Second Leg	Chester City	A	1–3 (Note: Bolton lose 2–3 on aggregate)	Cowdrill	3,784

=== Sherpa Van Trophy ===
Date	Round	Opponents	H / A	Result F–A	Scorers	Attendance
6 December 1988	Group Stage Game One	Preston North End	H	1–0	Thompson	2,695
20 November 1988	Group Stage Game Two	Bury	A	0–1		2,023
17 January 1989	Northern Section Round 1	Preston North End	A	1–0	Darby	5,569
21 February 1989	Northern Section Round 2	Wrexham	H	3–1 (a.e.t.)	Winstanley (2), Savage	3,833
21 March 1989	Northern Section Semi Final	Crewe Alexandra	A	2–1 (a.e.t.)	Winstanley, Brown	5,875
11 April 1989	Northern Section Final First Leg	Blackpool	H	1–0	Darby	10,345
18 April 1989	Northern Section Final Second Leg	Blackpool	A	1–1 (a.e.t.) (Note: Bolton win 2–1 on aggregate)	Thompson (pen)	10,345
28 May 1989	Final	Torquay United	Wembley Stadium	4–1	Darby, Morrison (og), Crombie, Morgan	46,513

== Top scorers ==
P	Player	Position	FL	FAC	LC	SVT	Total
1	(England) Trevor Morgan	Striker	10	0	0	1	11
1	(England) Steve Thompson	Midfielder	9	0	0	2	11
3	(England) Julian Darby	Striker	5	1	1	3	10
4	(England) John Thomas	Striker	9	0	0	0	9
5	(England) Robbie Savage	Midfielder	6	0	0	1	7
