= 1987–88 Bolton Wanderers F.C. season =

Bolton Wanderers
1987–88 season
- Chairman: Barry Chaytow
- Manager: Phil Neal
- Stadium: Burnden Park
- Fourth Division: 3rd
- FA Cup: Third round
- Littlewoods Cup: First round
- Associate Members Cup: Northern Section first round
- Top goalscorer: League: John Thomas (22); All: John Thomas (28)
- Highest home attendance: 9,921 (vs. Burnley, 4 April 1988)
- Lowest home attendance: 3,375 (vs. Preston North End, 13 October 1987)

The 1987–1988 season was the 109th season in Bolton Wanderers F.C.'s existence, and their first season in the Fourth Division following relegation from the Third Division. Until the 2020-21 season, it was the only season that the club had spent in the bottom tier of English football.

This article covers the period from 1 July 1987 to 30 June 1988.

== Kit ==
Bolton retained the previous season's kit, manufactured by Umbro and sponsored by Normid.

== Results ==
=== Division Four ===
Date	Opponents	H / A	Result F–A	Scorers	Attendance
15 August 1987	Crewe Alexandra	H	1–1	Henshaw	4,792
22 August 1987	Cardiff City	H	1–0	Chandler	4,530
29 August 1987	Scarborough	A	0–4		4,462
31 August 1987	Peterborough United	H	2–0	Thomas (pen), Thompson	3,746
5 September 1987	Hereford United	A	3–0	Thomas (2), Morgan	2,541
12 September 1987	Halifax Town	H	2–0	Henshaw, Shaw (og)	4,445
15 September 1987	Scunthorpe United	A	1–1	Morgan	2,501
19 September 1987	Torquay United	A	1–2	Savage	2,211
26 September 1987	Hartlepool United	H	1–2	Came	4,398
3 October 1987	Wolverhampton Wanderers	H	1–0	Thomas (pen)	3,833
10 October 1987	Darlington	A	0–1		1,763
17 October 1987	Carlisle United	H	5–0	Brookman (2), Darby, S.Elliott, Wright (og)	4,184
20 October 1987	Exeter City	H	1–0	Came	4,165
24 October 1987	Rochdale	A	2–2	Thomas (2) (1pen)	4,294
31 October 1987	Swansea City	H	1–1	Thompson	4,607
3 November 1987	Newport County	A	1–0	S. Elliott	1,566
7 November 1987	Leyton Orient	H	1–0	Thomas	5,189
21 November 1987	Burnley	A	1–2	Thomas	7,489
28 November 1987	Cambridge United	H	2–2	Thomas (2)	4,294
11 December 1987	Colchester United	A	0–3		1,725
15 December 1987	Tranmere Rovers	A	0–2		3,064
19 December 1987	Wrexham	H	2–0	Thomas	4,703
26 December 1987	Hartlepool United	A	0–0		4,102
28 December 1987	Stockport County	H	2–1	Storer, Morgan	6,607
1 January 1988	Scarborough	H	3–1	Came, Thomas, Thompson	6,295
12 January 1988	Halifax Town	A	0–0		2,689
16 January 1988	Torquay United	H	1–2	Came	5,996
30 January 1988	Peterborough United	H	4–0	Thomas (3) (2pens), Brookman	3,485
6 February 1988	Hereford United	H	1–0	Savage	4,559
12 February 1988	Stockport County	H	2–1	Brookman, Morgan	4,814
20 February 1988	Crewe Alexandra	A	1–2	Morgan	4,305
27 February 1988	Wolverhampton Wanderers	A	0–4		12,430
1 March 1988	Tranmere Rovers	H	2–0	Thompson, Thomas	3,979
5 March 1988	Carlisle United	A	2–0	Thomas (pen), Brookman	2,796
11 March 1988	Darlington	H	1–1	Brookman	4,948
18 March 1988	Swansea City	A	0–1		3,980
26 March 1988	Rochdale	H	0–0		4,875
2 April 1988	Leyton Orient	A	2–1	Darby, May	4,537
4 April 1988	Burnley	H	2–1	May, Thompson	9,921
9 April 1988	Exeter City	A	1–1	Thomas	1,962
15 April 1988	Cardiff City	A	0–1		6,703
19 April 1988	Scunthorpe United	H	0–0		6,669
23 April 1988	Newport County	H	6–0	Thomas (3) (1pen), Morgan, Winstanley, Thompson	4,357
29 April 1988	Cambridge United	A	2–2	Thomas, Savage	2,063
2 May 1988	Colchester United	H	4–0	Thomas, Savage, Came, Chandler	5,540
7 May 1988	Wrexham	A	1–0	Savage	5,977

Pos	Team	Pld	W	D	L	GF	GA	GD	Pts	Promotion or relegation
1	Wolverhampton Wanderers (C, P)	46	27	9	10	82	43	+39	90	Promotion to the Third Division
2	Cardiff City (P)	46	24	13	9	66	41	+25	85	Cup Winners' Cup first round and promotion to the Third Division
3	Bolton Wanderers (P)	46	22	12	12	66	42	+24	78	Promotion to the Third Division
4	Scunthorpe United	46	20	17	9	76	51	+25	77	Qualification for the Fourth Division play-offs
5	Torquay United	46	21	14	11	66	41	+25	77	Qualification for the Fourth Division play-offs

(C) Champions; (P) Promoted

=== FA Cup ===
Date	Round	Opponents	H / A	Result F–A	Scorers	Attendance
14 November 1987	Round 1	Burnley	A	1–0	Thomas	10,461
5 December 1987	Round 2	Wrexham	A	2–1	Thomas	4,703
4 January 1988	Round 3	Barnsley	A	1–3	Stevens	9,667

=== Littlewoods Cup ===
Date	Round	Opponents	H / A	Result F–A	Scorers	Attendance
18 August 1987	Round 1 First Leg	Wigan Athletic	A	3–2	Morgan, Chandler	4,115
25 August 1987	Round 1 Second Leg	Wigan Athletic	H	1–3; 4–5 (agg)	Thomas	5,847

=== Associate Members Cup ===
Date	Round	Opponents	H / A	Result F–A	Scorers	Attendance
13 October 1987	Group Stage Game One	Preston North End	H	0–0		3,375
24 November 1987	Group Stage Game Two	Stockport County	A	3–1	Thomas (2), Brookman	2,123
19 January 1988	Northern Section Round 1	Bury	A	0–1		3,796

== Top scorers ==
P	Player	Position	FL	FAC	LC	AMC	Total
1	John Thomas	Striker	22	3	1	2	28
2	Trevor Morgan	Striker	6	0	1	0	7
3=	Steve Thompson	Midfielder	6	0	0	0	6
3=	Nicky Brookman	Striker	5	0	0	1	6
5=	Mark Came	Defender	5	0	0	0	5
5=	Robbie Savage	Midfielder	5	0	0	0	5
