= Kame (disambiguation) =

A kame is a geomorphological feature.

Kame or KAME may also refer to:

- Khami, or Kame, an ancient city of Zimbabwe
- KAME project, a cooperative UNIX IPv6 coding effort of six Japanese companies
- KNSN-TV, a television station (channel 20) licensed to Reno, Nevada, United States, which held the call sign KAME-TV from 1981 to 2019
- Kame Sennin (Japanese for "Turtle Hermit") or Master Roshi, a character in Dragon Ball media
- Kazuya Kamenashi (亀梨和也, Kamenashi Kazuya), also known as Kame, a Japanese singer, member of the group KAT-TUN

== People with the name ==
- Amy Kame (born 1992), American basketball player
- Kamé Ali (born 1984), Malagasy athlete
- Kame Nakamura (1898–2012), Japanese supercentenarian

== See also ==
- Came (disambiguation)
- Kaim (disambiguation)
- Kame Island, in Antarctica
