= Came (surname) =

Came is a surname, and may refer to:

- Charles Greene Came (1826–1879), American lawyer, newspaper editor, and politician
- Harry Came (born 1998), English cricketer
- Kenneth Came (1925–1986), British Army officer and cricketer
- Mark Came (born 1961), English footballer
- Richard Adolphus Came (1847–1917), English architect
- Shaun Came (born 1983), English footballer
