= Kaim =

Kaim may refer to:

- Anglicization of the Arabic word Qa'im ("riser")
- Kaimganj, a town in the Indian state of Uttar Pradesh
- People with the surname Kaim:

- Barbara Kaim (born 1952), Polish archaeologist
- Konrad Valentin von Kaim (1737–1801), Habsburg general during the French Revolutionary Wars
- Ignatius Gottfried Kaim (1746–1778), Austrian chemist
- Peter Kaim-Caudle (1916–2010), German-born British social policy professor
- Wolfgang Kaim (born 1951), German chemist
- Radosław Kaim (born 1973), Polish actor
- Khaled Kaim, Libyan politician

== See also ==
- Caim (disambiguation)
