= Delta Kappa (freshman society) =

American collegiate freshman society founded at Yale in 1845

- ΔΚ
- Founded: November 1845; 181 years ago Yale College
- Type: Secret
- Affiliation: Independent
- Status: Defunct
- Emphasis: Freshman
- Scope: National
- Chapters: 7
- Headquarters: United States

Delta Kappa (ΔΚ), also known as "Delta Kap", was an American collegiate secret society and freshman fraternity founded at Yale College in 1845. It was one of the freshman organizations in Yale's nineteenth-century system of class societies and developed a longstanding rivalry with Kappa Sigma Epsilon, another Yale freshman society. Unlike most Yale class societies, Delta Kappa expanded beyond Yale, establishing additional chapters at colleges in the eastern and southern United States, However, all chapters went inactive by 1885.

== History ==
=== Founding at Yale ===
Delta Kappa was organized at Yale College in November 1845 by twelve members of the Class of 1849, including Charles Greene Came, who later became an editor of the Boston Journal. It became part of the elaborate system of class societies that developed at Yale during the nineteenth century. Students could belong successively to organizations associated with different undergraduate years, including freshman, sophomore, junior, and senior societies.

Delta Kappa was one of the principal freshman societies, competing particularly with Kappa Sigma Epsilon. Both organizations recruited members from each entering class and engaged in the electioneering and initiation practices associated with Yale's class-society system.

By the later nineteenth century, membership in the freshman societies could be extensive rather than limited to a small elite. At other colleges where the Yale system was imitated, a substantial portion of each freshman class could belong to Delta Kappa or its rival societies.

=== Expansion ===
Delta Kappa differed from most Yale freshman societies by establishing chapters at other colleges. The society eventually established seven chapters. Its expansion began before the Civil War with chapters at the University of North Carolina (c. 1850/51), Amherst College (1851), the University of Virginia (1851), and the University of Mississippi (1853); Dartmouth followed in 1860 and Centre College in 1867.

The society's expansion produced slight variations in the role of individual chapters. While Delta Kappa remained specifically a freshman organization at Yale and Dartmouth, the extent to which its other chapters retained the same class-year restriction is unclear.

At Amherst College, the Gamma chapter, established on November 21, 1851, was particularly large. George Rugg Cutting's 1871 history of student organizations at Amherst reported that the chapter ultimately enrolled 555 members before its charter was withdrawn in July 1870.

=== Civil War and decline ===
Delta Kappa's three Southern chapters, the University of North Carolina, the University of Virginia, and the University of Mississippi, ceased operating during the American Civil War. Baird's nineteenth-century history stated that the society's southern branches were lost during the conflict.

The society continued at several northern institutions after the war. Amherst's chapter surrendered its charter in 1870. At Centre College in Kentucky, the Eta chapter, established in 1867, continued until 1879, when it was absorbed by the already existing Kentucky Alpha chapter of Phi Delta Theta.

=== Suppression at Yale ===
By the 1870s, Yale's underclass societies had become the subject of growing faculty criticism because of electioneering, initiation practices, hazing, and disorderly social activities. Yale suppressed its sophomore societies in 1875 and took similar action against its two principal freshman societies, Delta Kappa and Kappa Sigma Epsilon, in 1880. Yale's later institutional histories consistently list Delta Kappa as active there from 1845 to 1880.

The abolition of the parent chapter at Yale did not immediately extinguish the society elsewhere. At Dartmouth, Delta Kappa continued into the early 1880s; it was listed in the college's 1884 Aegis but omitted from the 1885 edition.

== Symbols ==
Delta Kappa's badge was in the shape of an upward-curving crescent. Nineteenth-century descriptions depict an ornamental crescent of chased gold, enameled in black, about 3/4 of an inch in diameter. Inside the crescent at its center was a small shield of white enamel. On the shield were displayed a crossed key and dagger beneath a crescent, all in gold. A five-pointed star appeared at either end of the crescent, and the Greek letters "Δ" and "Κ" appeared on the lower portion of the crescent, one letter on each side of the shield.

== Chapters ==
Historical sources disagree on the designations and, in some cases, the founding dates of the early chapters, particularly those at Amherst College and the University of North Carolina. Some nineteenth-century fraternity references reverse the Beta and Gamma chapter designations, listing Amherst as Beta and North Carolina as Gamma. Cutting's 1871 history of Amherst College, however, explicitly identifies the Amherst organization as the "Gamma chapter". The following table reflects the chapter sequence most strongly supported by the surviving college-specific sources.

Chapter	Charter date and range	Institution	Location	Status	Ref.
Alpha	1845–1880	Yale College	New Haven, Connecticut	Inactive	(Note: Parent chapter; abolished when Yale suppressed freshman societies.)
Beta	c. 1850/51–1861	University of North Carolina	Chapel Hill, North Carolina	Inactive	(Note: Chapter closed during the American Civil War.)
Gamma	November 21, 1851–July 1870	Amherst College	Amherst, Massachusetts	Inactive	(Note: Charter withdrawn.)
Delta	1851–1861	University of Virginia	Charlottesville, Virginia	Inactive	
Epsilon	1853–1861	University of Mississippi	Oxford, Mississippi	Inactive	
Zeta	1860–c. 1884	Dartmouth College	Hanover, New Hampshire	Inactive	(Note: Chapter continued after the closure of the Yale chapter; disbanded after upper-class fraternities began recruiting freshmen.)
Eta	1867–1879	Centre College	Danville, Kentucky	Inactive	(Note: Chapter absorbed by the Kentucky Alpha chapter of Phi Delta Theta.)

== Notable members ==
- Charles Greene Came (Yale) - founder of Delta Kappa; lawyer, newspaper editor, and member of Maine House of Representatives.
- Walter Camp (Yale) - American football player, coach, and sportswriter known as the “Father of American Football.”
- George Shiras, Jr. (Yale) - associate justice of the United States Supreme Court.
- William Howard Taft (Yale) - president of Delta Kappa; 27th president of the United States and 10th chief justice of the United States Supreme Court.
- Francis Amasa Walker (Amherst) - economist, statistician, Union army general, superintendent of the 1870 and 1880 U.S. censuses, and president of the Massachusetts Institute of Technology.

== See also ==
- Collegiate secret societies in North America
- Delta Kappa Epsilon
- Alpha Sigma Phi
