= Came (disambiguation) =

A came is a divider bar used in glass panes.

Came may also refer to:

- Came, Pyrénées-Atlantiques, a commune in France
- Came (surname)
- Chams (Albanians) (Albanian: Çamët, singular: Çamë – Cham), an Albanian subgroup

== See also ==
- Kame (disambiguation)
- Caim (disambiguation)
- Winterborne Came, Dorset, England
- Come (disambiguation)
