= Sid Lowe =

English columnist and journalist

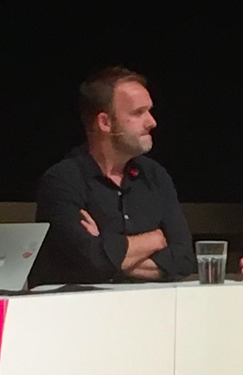
- Lowe in 2018
- Born: Simon James Lowe; 21 June 1976 (age 49); Archway, London, England
- Education: University of Sheffield (BA, MA, PhD)
- Occupation: Journalist

Simon James "Sid" Lowe (born 21 June 1976) is an English columnist and journalist. Born in Archway, London, and based in Madrid, he covers Spanish football for many publications, websites, television channels, radio stations, and football-related podcasts across the world.

== Early life ==
Lowe was born and raised in north London. He is a fan of neither Arsenal nor Tottenham Hotspur, his two local clubs and fierce rivals, but instead grew up supporting Liverpool. He attributes this to his older brother, Ben Lowe forbidding him from following Queens Park Rangers, the same team as he supported, so Lowe picked Liverpool from a list of teams who played in red, settling on them as he admired Kenny Dalglish.

Lowe studied History and Spanish at the University of Sheffield, spending a year in Oviedo for the Spanish language part of his degree. There, he became a fan of local club Real Oviedo. He later took a master's degree in History, followed by a PhD on 20th-century Spanish history. While in Spain performing research for his master's, he was approached by Guardian journalist and university friend Sean Ingle to write a column on Spanish football.

== Journalism ==
Lowe has been writing for The Guardian newspaper and website since 2001. He regularly appears (via phone or Skype) on The Guardian's football podcast Football Weekly where he gives updates on the latest news in La Liga, the top division of Spanish football. He conducted a series of relatively lighthearted interviews for an interview series known as "Small Talk" for The Guardian, with Spain-based and Spanish players. Some recurrent questions in the "Small Talk" interview series included: "What was the last CD you bought?", "What was the last book you read?" and "Who would win a fight between a lion and a tiger?"

== Websites, television and radio contributions ==
Lowe writes regularly for World Soccer and FourFourTwo magazines, and gives updates on the Asian television series FourFourTwo. He was Talksport's reporter in Spain who brought regular reports to the Hawksbee and Jacobs show, as well as the Drive Time show with Darren Gough and Adrian Durham. He works as a football commentator and panelist for Spanish, Asian and US television, regularly appearing on ESPN, and appears on the TV channel of Real Madrid. Lowe could also be heard regularly on the US soccer podcast Beyond the Pitch giving regular La Liga updates several times a month.

Together with Fillippo Ricci, the Spanish football correspondent for Gazzetta dello Sport, and Martin Ainstein, a reporter, commentator and correspondent for ESPN football in Spain, Lowe participated in a YouTube series called Foreign Desk, devoted to the coverage of football in Spain. The three journalists discussed the weekly events in Spanish football in a casual and informal manner. Each episode lasted about four-and-a-half minutes.

== Other works ==
In February 2008, Lowe completed a PhD, titled "The Juventud de Acción Popular in Spain, 1932-1937", at the University of Sheffield. On 1 October 2010, the thesis was published as a book by Sussex Academic Press titled Catholicism, War and the Foundation of Francoism: The Juventud de Acción Popular in Spain, 1932-1937. The book expanded on his thesis and deals with the political history of the Catholic youth movement during the Spanish Second Republic and Spanish Civil War.

During his time in Spain, Lowe acted as a translator for players like David Beckham, Michael Owen, and Thomas Gravesen. He is known to be a fan and shareholder of the Spanish club Real Oviedo.

He is also the author of the acclaimed book Fear and Loathing in La Liga: Barcelona, Real Madrid, and the World's Greatest Sports Rivalry, which chronicles the relationship between the two Spanish giants and was a nominee for the William Hill Sports Book of the Year for 2013.

== Controversies ==
In August 2008, Lowe wrote a news article for The Guardian that caused controversy in Spain, in which he reported on a photo that showed the Spain national basketball team posing in a way that could potentially be seen as offensive to Chinese and other Asian people. The Chinese embassy in Spain said that they "didn't consider the gesture as racist". Although the article was relatively short and appeared on page 9 of the newspaper's sports section, it touched off a heated back and forth between Spain and the "Anglo-Saxon" world.

Lowe subsequently wrote an article explaining and defending the publishing of the article in the Media section of The Guardian's website. In the article he recounted the backlash that he experienced in the Spanish media after the publication of the article.
