= Caim =

Caim may refer to:

- Caim (demon), a demon in Western demonology.
- Caim, Anglesey, a hamlet in Wales
- Caim (Dungeons & Dragons), a devil in the Dungeons and Dragons fictional universe
- Caim (Drakengard), a character in the Drakengard series of video games
- Caim, a village near Enniscorthy, County Wexford, Ireland

== See also ==
- Kaim (disambiguation)
- Came (disambiguation)
