= Kame Island =

Antarctic island

- Location within Antarctica

Geography
- Location: Antarctica
- Coordinates: 67°58′S 44°12′E

Administration
- Administered under the Antarctic Treaty System

Demographics
- Population: Uninhabited

Kame Island is an island 7 kilometres (4 nmi) east of Cape Ryugu, lying close to the shore of Queen Maud Land, Antarctica. It was mapped from surveys and air photos by the Japanese Antarctic Research Expedition, 1957–62, and named Kameshima (turtle island) because of its shape.

== See also ==
- List of antarctic and sub-antarctic islands
