= Khone-ye Div =

Fire temple in Davarzan County, Iranian national heritage site

- Archaeological site
- Khone-ye Div
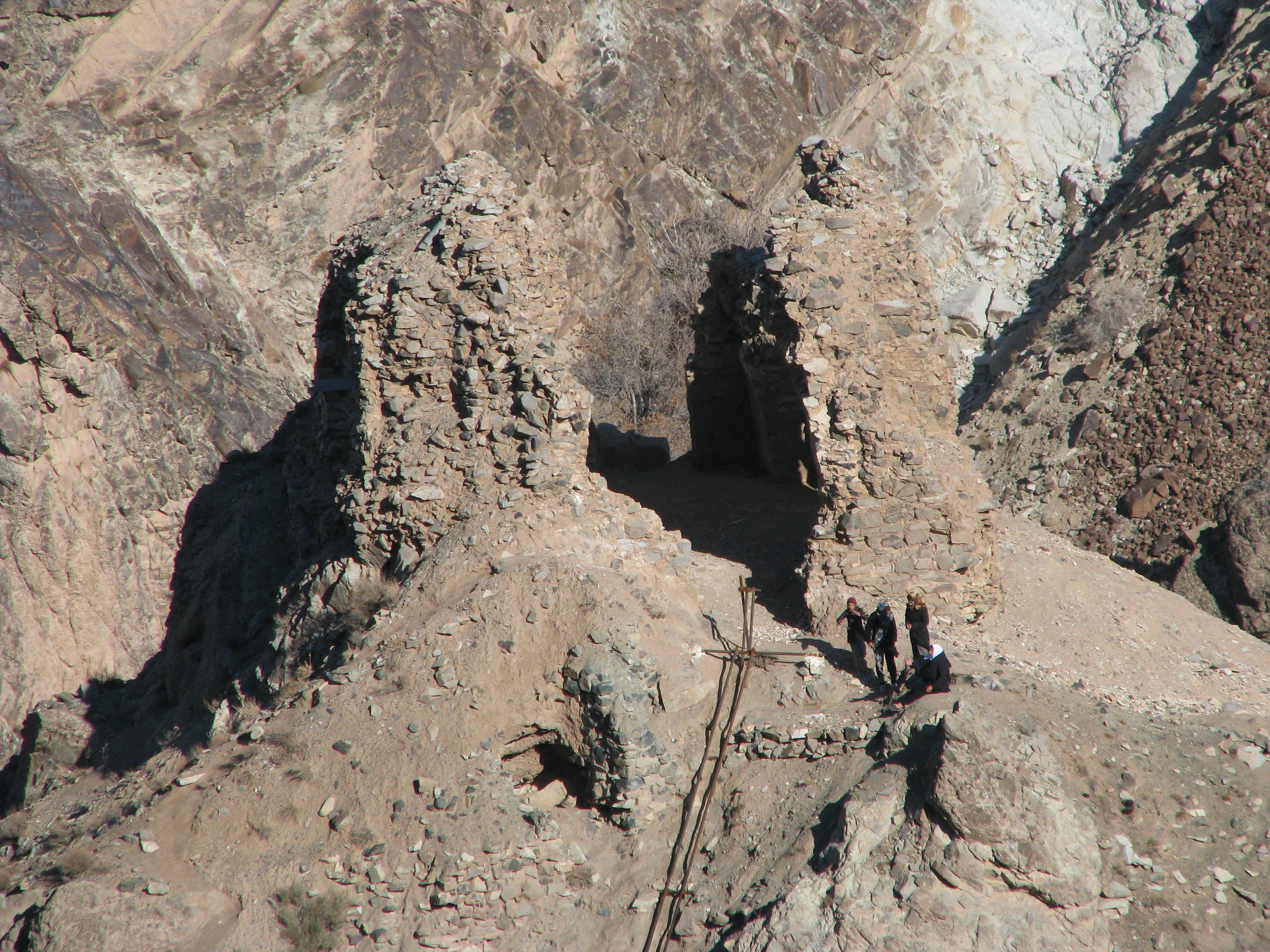
- 1آتشکده آذر برزین مهر
- Interactive map of Khone-ye Div
- Coordinates: 36°20′34.0″N 57°20′55.4″E

Khone-ye Div (pers خانه دیو, also known as: Khune-ye Div) – An archaeological site located in Iran, in the Razavi Khorasan province (historical land of Khorasan). It is located on top of a rocky spur, in the Rivand mountain range, in the watershed of the river of the same name

== Archaeological research ==
The excavations began in 2008 on behalf of the Polish Centre of Mediterranean Archaeology University of Warsaw, the Institute of Archaeology (now Faculty of Archaeology) of the University of Warsaw and the Iranian Center for Archaeological Research. The Polish-Iranian expedition was co-directed by dr Barbara Kaim (Polish side) and dr Hassan Hashemi (Iranian side). The stone structure studied at the site is Chahartaq (chahar tagh), which means four arches in Persian, a type of object characteristic of temple and palace architecture of the Sasanian period]. Chahar tagh is an equilateral building consisting of four arches or cradle vaults supported by corner pillars, the central part is covered by a dome. Thus, inside, a cross-plan room is created.

The site is located approximately two kilometres from the settlement, the remains of which were identified through surface survey carried out in 2010. The first season of research made it possible to learn the plan of the structure and confirm the hypothesis that it is a Chahartaq. The entrance was located on its north-eastern side and was preceded by a narrow corridor. The furnishings discovered in the main room indicate that it may have been a Zoroastrian fire temple, but the key installation, the fire altar, was not found due to extensive damage. Instead, fragments of a large platform were identified which may be its remains. In the following seasons (2009–2010) further soundings were carried out and chronological phases were established, and further objects were identified in the vicinity of the structure. To the east of the building, a square tank carved in the rock was discovered, which served for storing water – its walls were covered with gypsum plaster, which underwent conservation work. The conservation work also included plaster covering the staircase within a room of unknown purpose, which was adjacent to the north-eastern side of the building.
