= Mele Hairam =

Mele-Heiran

Religion
- Affiliation: Zoroastrianism
- Province: Ahal Province

Location
- Location: Serakhs Oasis
- Country: Turkmenistan
- Interactive map of Mele-Heiran

Architecture
- Completed: Late Parthian period

Mele-Heiran is a Zoroastrian fire temple located in the Ahal Province of Turkmenistan. It was discovered in 1997 by a Polish-Turkmen expedition led by Barbara Kaim, a professor of archaeology at the University of Warsaw. The complex archaeological project is known as the "Mele-Heiran Fire Temple."

== History ==
The temple is believed to have been constructed during the late Parthian period. In the Sassanian era, it was known as Atash-Bahram.

The site was found in the Serakhs Oasis, 15 kilometers east of the city of Serakhs.
