= 1986–87 Manchester City F.C. season =

English football club season

Manchester City
1986–87 season
- Manager: Billy McNeill (to 20 Sept 1986); Jimmy Frizzell (from 21 Sept 1986)
- Stadium: Maine Road
- First Division: 21st (relegated)
- FA Cup: Third round
- Football League Cup: Third round
- Full Members' Cup: Quarter-finals
- Top goalscorer: League: Imre Varadi (9); All: Imre Varadi (11)
- Highest home attendance: 35,336 vs Liverpool; 17 January 1988
- Lowest home attendance: 9,373 vs Southend United; 8 October 1986
- Average home league attendance: 21,922 (8th highest in league)
- Biggest win: 3–0 (25 Apr 1987 vs Arsenal, First Division)
- Biggest defeat: 5–0 (27 Dec 1986 at Charlton Athletic, First Division)

The 1986–87 season was Manchester City's 85th season in existence and 65th season in the top division of English football. In addition to the First Division, they competed in the FA Cup, Football League Cup and Full Members' Cup. City were relegated to the Second Division after finishing 21st in the league table.

== First Division ==
=== League table ===
Pos	Team	Pld	W	D	L	GF	GA	GD	Pts	Qualification or relegation
18	Oxford United	42	11	13	18	44	69	−25	46	
19	Charlton Athletic (O)	42	11	11	20	45	55	−10	44	Qualification for the Second Division play-offs
20	Leicester City (R)	42	11	9	22	54	76	−22	42	Relegation to the Second Division
21	Manchester City (R)	42	8	15	19	36	57	−21	39	Relegation to the Second Division
22	Aston Villa (R)	42	8	12	22	45	79	−34	36	Relegation to the Second Division

Source: World Football
Rules for classification: 1) Points; 2) Goal difference; 3) Goals scored
(O) Play-off winners; (R) Relegated

=== Results summary ===
Overall								Home						Away					
Pld	W	D	L	GF	GA	GD	Pts	W	D	L	GF	GA	GD	W	D	L	GF	GA	GD
42	8	15	19	36	57	−21	39	8	6	7	28	24	+4	0	9	12	8	33	−25

=== Results by matchday ===
Matchday	1	2	3	4	5	6	7	8	9	10	11	12	13	14	15	16	17	18	19	20	21	22	23	24	25	26	27	28	29	30	31	32	33	34	35	36	37	38	39	40	41	42
Ground	H	A	A	H	H	A	H	A	H	A	A	H	A	H	H	A	H	A	H	A	H	A	A	H	H	A	A	H	A	A	H	H	A	A	H	H	H	A	H	A	H	A
Result	W	D	L	D	L	D	D	L	L	L	L	D	D	W	W	L	L	L	W	D	W	L	D	W	L	D	D	D	L	L	L	D	L	D	L	D	L	L	W	D	W	L

A = Away; H = Home; W = Win; D = Draw; L = Loss

=== Matches ===
Date	Opponents	H / A	Venue	Result F–A	Scorers	Attendance
23 August 1986	Wimbledon	H	Maine Road	3–1	Baker (2), Christie	20,756
25 August 1986	Liverpool	A	Anfield	0–0		39,989
30 August 1986	Tottenham Hotspur	A	White Hart Lane	1–0		23,764
3 September 1986	Norwich City	H	Maine Road	2–2	Christie (2)	19,122
6 September 1986	Coventry City	H	Maine Road	0–1		18,320
13 September 1986	Oxford United	A	Manor Ground	0–0		8,245
20 September 1986	Queens Park Rangers	H	Maine Road	0–0		17,774
27 September 1986	Luton Town	A	Kenilworth Road	1–0		9,371
4 October 1986	Leicester City	H	Maine Road	1–2	Hopkins	18,033
11 October 1986	Newcastle United	A	St James' Park	1–3	Simpson	21,780
18 October 1986	Chelsea	A	Stamford Bridge	1–2	Varadi	12,990
26 October 1986	Manchester United	H	Maine Road	1–1	McCarthy	32,440
1 November 1986	Southampton	A	The Dell	1–1	Baker	14,352
8 November 1986	Aston Villa	H	Maine Road	3–1	Moulden (2), Varadi	22,875
15 November 1986	Charlton Athletic	H	Maine Road	2–1	Moulden, Simpson	20,578
22 November 1986	Arsenal	A	Highbury	0–3		29,009
29 November 1986	Everton	H	Maine Road	1–3	Moulden	27,097
6 December 1986	Nottingham Forest	A	City Ground	0–2		19,129
13 December 1986	West Ham United	H	Maine Road	3–1	White, Varadi (2)	19,067
21 December 1986	Coventry City	A	Highfield Road	2–2	Redmond (2)	12,430
26 December 1986	Sheffield Wednesday	H	Maine Road	1–0	Simpson	30,193
28 December 1986	Charlton Athletic	A	The Valley	0–5		7,697
1 January 1987	Watford	A	Vicarage Road	1–1	Varadi	15,514
3 January 1987	Oxford United	H	Maine Road	1–0	McNab (pen)	20,724
17 January 1987	Liverpool	H	Maine Road	0–1		35,336
24 January 1987	Wimbledon	A	Plough Lane	0–0		5,667
14 February 1987	Norwich City	A	Maine Road	1–1	I. Brightwell	16,094
21 February 1987	Luton Town	H	Maine Road	1–1	Lake	17,507
28 February 1987	Queens Park Rangers	A	Loftus Road	0–1		12,739
7 March 1987	Manchester United	A	Old Trafford	0–2		48,619
14 March 1987	Chelsea	H	Maine Road	1–2	McNab (pen)	19,819
21 March 1987	Newcastle United	H	Maine Road	0–0		23,060
28 March 1987	Leicester City	A	Filbert Street	4–0		10,743
4 April 1987	Aston Villa	A	Villa Park	0–0		18,241
11 April 1987	Southampton	H	Maine Road	2–4	Stewart, Moulden	18,193
15 April 1987	Tottenham Hotspur	H	Maine Road	1–1	McNab (pen)	21,460
18 April 1987	Watford	H	Maine Road	1–2	McNab (pen)	18,541
20 April 1987	Sheffield Wednesday	A	Hillsborough	2–1	Varadi	19,769
25 April 1987	Arsenal	H	Maine Road	3–0	Varadi (2), Stewart	18,072
2 May 1987	Everton	A	Goodison Park	0–0		37,541
4 May 1987	Nottingham Forest	H	Maine Road	1–0	Varadi	21,405
9 May 1987	West Ham United	A	Boleyn Ground	0–2		18,413

== FA Cup ==
9 January 1987 Third round	Manchester United	1–0	Manchester City	Manchester
				Stadium: Old Trafford

== EFL Cup ==
22 September 1986 Third round	Southend United	0–0	Manchester City	Southend-on-Sea
				Stadium: Roots Hall

8 October 1986 Third round	Manchester City	2–1	Southend United	Manchester
				Stadium: Maine Road

27 October 1986 Fourth round	Arsenal	3–1	Manchester City	London
				Stadium: Highbury

== Full Members' Cup ==
4 November 1986 Second round	Manchester City	3–1	Wimbledon	Manchester
				Stadium: Maine Road

26 November 1986 Third round	Manchester City	1–0	Watford	Manchester
				Stadium: Maine Road

31 January 1987 Quarter final	Manchester City	2–3	Ipswich Town	Manchester
				Stadium: Maine Road
