= 1975–76 Manchester City F.C. season =

English football club season

Manchester City
1975–76 season
- Manager: Tony Book
- Stadium: Maine Road
- First Division: 8th
- FA Cup: Fourth round
- League Cup: Winners
- Anglo-Scottish Cup: Group Stage
- Top goalscorer: League: Dennis Tueart(14); All: Dennis Tueart(24)
- Highest home attendance: 50,439 vs Liverpool; 19 April 1976
- Lowest home attendance: 26,536 vs Nottingham Forest; 8 October 1975
- Average home league attendance: 34,284 (4th in highest in league)

The 1975–76 season was Manchester City's 74th season of competitive football and 56th season in the top division of English football. In addition to the First Division, the club competed in the FA Cup, Football League Cup and the Anglo-Scottish Cup. The club won the Football League Cup, their first major trophy in 6 years. The final is best remembered for Dennis Tueart's famous overhead kick early in the second half, which proved to be the winning goal in the end. It was a final that most City fans held onto however, because the club wouldn't win another trophy for 35 years.

== First Division ==
=== League table ===
Pos	Team	Pld	W	D	L	GF	GA	GAv	Pts	Qualification or relegation
6	Ipswich Town	42	16	14	12	54	48	1.125	46	
7	Leicester City	42	13	19	10	48	51	0.941	45	
8	Manchester City	42	16	11	15	64	46	1.391	43	Qualification for the UEFA Cup first round
9	Tottenham Hotspur	42	14	15	13	63	63	1.000	43	
10	Norwich City	42	16	10	16	58	58	1.000	42	

Source: World Football
Rules for classification: 1) Points; 2) Goal average; 3) Goals scored

=== Results summary ===
Overall								Home						Away					
Pld	W	D	L	GF	GA	GAv	Pts	W	D	L	GF	GA	Pts	W	D	L	GF	GA	Pts
42	16	11	15	64	46	1.391	43	14	5	2	46	18	33	2	6	13	18	28	10

==== Matches ====
Win	Draw	Loss

Date	Opponent	Venue	Result (Note: Manchester City's score written first)	Scorers	Attendance
16 August 1975	Norwich City	Home	3–2	Bell, Tueart 2	29,103
20 August 1975	Leicester City	Home	1–1	Birchenhall (og)	28,556
23 August 1975	Coventry City	Away	0–2	—	21,097
27 August 1975	Aston Villa	Away	0–1	–	35,212
30 August 1975	Newcastle United	Home	4–0	Tueart 2, Royle 2	31,875
6 September 1975	West Ham United	Away	0–1	–	29,792
13 September 1975	Middlesbrough	Home	4–0	Royle, Marsh 2, Tueart	30,353
20 September 1975	Derby County	Away	0–1	–	23,250
24 September 1975	Stoke City	Home	1–0	Marsh	28,975
27 September 1975	Manchester United	Home	2–2	Royle, Nicholl (og)	46,931
4 October 1975	Arsenal	Away	3–2	Hartford, Royle, Marsh	24,928
11 October 1975	Burnley	Home	0–0	—	35,003
18 October 1975	Tottenham Hotspur	Away	2–2	Watson, Bell	30,502
25 October 1975	Ipswich Town	Home	1–1	Bell	30,664
1 November 1975	Sheffield United	Away	2–2	Barnes, Booth	24,670
8 November 1975	Birmingham City	Home	2–0	Bell 2	28,329
15 November 1975	Everton	Away	1–1	Booth	32,077
22 November 1975	Tottenham Hotspur	Home	2–1	Tueart, Oakes	31,456
29 November 1975	Wolverhampton Wanderers	Away	4–0	Hartford 2, Barnes, Tueart	20,867
6 December 1975	Queens Park Rangers	Home	0–0	–	36,066
13 December 1975	Coventry City	Home	4–2	Oakes, Barnes, Booth, Tueart	27,256
20 December 1975	Norwich City	Away	2–2	Tueart, Royle	19,692
26 December 1975	Leeds United	Home	0–1	–	48,077
27 December 1975	Liverpool	Away	0–1	–	53,386
10 January 1976	Middlesbrough	Away	0–1	Royle	23,000
17 January 1976	West Ham United	Home	3–0	Royle 2, Oakes	32,147
31 January 1976	Leicester City	Away	0–1	–	21,723
7 February 1976	Aston Villa	Home	2–1	Booth, Hartford	32,332
14 February 1976	Birmingham City	Away	1–2	Hartford	22,445
21 February 1976	Everton	Home	3–0	Hartford, Tueart, Royle	33,148
6 March 1976	Sheffield United	Home	4–0	Hartford 2, Tueart, Royle	33,510
13 March 1976	Burnley	Away	0–0	–	24,278
20 March 1976	Wolverhampton Wanderers	Home	3–2	Keegan, Tueart, Royle	32,761
27 March 1976	Queens Park Rangers	Away	0–1	–	29,883
2 April 1976	Stoke City	Away	0–0	–	18,798
7 April 1976	Ipswich Town	Away	1–2	Keegan	21,290
10 April 1976	Derby County	Home	4–3	Tueart 2 Royle, Power	42,061
14 April 1976	Newcastle United	Away	1–2	Royle	21,095
17 April 1976	Leeds United	Away	1–2	Bell	33,514
19 April 1976	Liverpool	Home	0–3	–	50,439
24 April 1976	Arsenal	Home	3–1	Booth (2), Hartford	31,003
4 May 1976	Manchester United	Away	0–2	–	59,528

== FA Cup ==
=== Results ===
Date	Round	Opponents	H / A	Venue	Result F – A	Scorers	Attendance
3 January 1976	3rd round	Hartlepool United	H	Maine Road	6–0	Oakes, Tueart (2), Booth (2), Hartford	26,863
28 January 1976	4th round	Stoke City	A	Victoria Ground	0–1		38,072

== Football League Cup ==
=== Second round ===
10 September 1975 1975–76 Football League Cup Second round	Norwich City	1–1	Manchester City	Norwich
	McDougall 77'		Watson 85'	Stadium: Carrow Road; Attendance: 18,332; Referee: Brian Daniels

17 September 1975 1975–76 Football League Cup Second round replay	Manchester City	2–2	Norwich City	Manchester
	Tueart 29' (pen.); Royle		McDougall	Stadium: Maine Road; Attendance: 29,667

29 September 1975 1975–76 Football League Cup Second round 2nd replay	Manchester City	6–1	Norwich City	London
	Tueart 1', 8', 68' (pen.); Royle 18'; Butler 50' (o.g.); Doyle 75'		Peters 5'	Stadium: Stamford Bridge; Attendance: 6,238

=== Third round ===
8 October 1975 1975–76 Football League Cup Third round	Manchester City	2–1	Nottingham Forest	Manchester
	Royle 12'; Bell 51'		Bowyer 67'	Stadium: Maine Road; Attendance: 26,536; Referee: Michael Lowe

=== Fourth round ===
12 November 1975 1975–76 Football League Cup Fourth round	Manchester City	4–0	Manchester United	Manchester
	Tueart 1', 18'; Hartford 14'; Royle 79'			Stadium: Maine Road; Attendance: 50,182; Referee: Jack Taylor

=== Quarter Final ===
3 December 1975 1975–76 Football League Cup Fifth round	Manchester City	4–2	Mansfield Town	Manchester
	Royle 8'; Oakes 36'; Tueart 56'; Hartford 87'		Clarke 17'; Bird 61'	Stadium: Maine Road; Attendance: 30,022; Referee: K Burns

=== Semi Final ===
13 January 1976 1975–76 Football League Cup Semi Final 1st leg	Middlesbrough	1–0	Manchester City	Middlesbrough
	Hickton 66'			Stadium: Ayresome Park; Attendance: 35,000; Referee: Mr E Wallace

21 January 1976 1975–76 Football League Cup Semi Final 2nd leg	Manchester City	4–0	Middlesbrough	Manchester
	Keegan 5'; Oakes 10'; Barnes 46'; Royle 89'			Stadium: Maine Road; Attendance: 44,426; Referee: John Gow

=== Final ===
28 February 1976 1975–76 Football League Cup Final	Manchester City	2–1	Newcastle United	Wembley
	Barnes 11'; Tueart 47'		Gowling 35'	Stadium: Wembley Stadium; Attendance: 100,000; Referee: Jack Taylor

== Awards ==
=== PFA Team of the Year (1970s) ===
Pos	Player
FW	(England) Dennis Tueart

=== PFA Young Player of the Year ===
Player
(England) Peter Barnes
