= Cape Ryugu =

Cape on the coast of Queen Maud Land in Antarctica

Cape Ryugu (67°58′S 44°2′E) is a rocky cape 7 nautical miles (13 km) northeast of Rakuda Rock on the coast of Queen Maud Land in Antarctica. Mapped from surveys and air photos by Japanese Antarctic Research Expedition (JARE), 1957–1962, and named Ryugu-misaki (cape of the dragon's palace).
