= Ignatius Gottfried Kaim =

Austrian chemist

- Born: 1746
- Died: 1778 (aged 31–32)
- Known for: discovery of manganese

Ignatius Gottfried Kaim was a chemist from the Holy Roman Empire. In his dissertation De metallis dubiis published in 1770 Kaim describes the reduction of manganese oxide with carbon and the formation of a brittle metal. This is the first description of manganese metal several years before the better known synthesis of Johan Gottlieb Gahn in 1774.
