= Gary Henshaw =

English footballer

Personal information
- Date of birth: 18 February 1965 (age 61)
- Place of birth: Leeds, England
- Height: 5 ft 9 in (1.75 m)
- Position: Midfielder

Senior career*
Years	Team	Apps	(Gls)
1983–1987	Grimsby Town	50	(9)
1987–1991	Bolton Wanderers	70	(4)
1989–1990	→ Rochdale (loan)	9	(1)
1991	Swansea City	0	(0)
1991–1992	Chorley		
1992	Runcorn	4	(0)
1992–1997	Hyde United	135	(7)
1997–1998	Radcliffe Borough		
Total		268	(21)
- * Club domestic league appearances and goals

Gary Henshaw (born 18 February 1965) is an English former professional footballer who played in the Football League as a midfielder. After retiring he worked as a commentator for his former team Bolton Wanderers. During the 2020–21 season he was criticised by then Bolton Manager Ian Evatt for his negative commentary, with Evatt annoyed that Henshaw was criticising the players despite them being on a winning streak.
