= Barbara Kaim =

Polish archaeologist, professor at the Faculty of Archaeology

- Born: 1 December 1952
- Awards: "Clio" (Warsaw University Publications Award), 1996, 2003; Rector of Warsaw University Award, 2001, 2003, 2004, 2006; Medal of the President of Turkmenistan for the development of science, education and culture, 2014;
- Scientific career
- Fields: Archaeology
- Workplaces: Faculty of Archaeology, University of Warsaw

Barbara Kaim (born 1 December 1952) is a Polish archaeologist, professor at the Faculty of Archaeology University of Warsaw. Her research focuses on the Achaemenid, Parthian and Sasanian periods in Iran and Central Asia.

== Professional career ==
Barbara Kaim studied at the Institute of Archaeology (now Faculty of Archaeology) (graduated in 1977). Since 1977 she worked as a Research Assistant. After completing her PhD in 1983, she began working as an assistant professor in the Department of Near Eastern Archaeology at the same institute. She did her habilitation in 2003, working on the architecture of Kushan period, and became a professor in 2005. On 18 April 2013, she was awarded the title of Professor.

== Excavations ==
In 1995 Barbara Kaim began archaeological research at Old Serakhs, located in Serakhs oasis, Turkmenistan. Two years later she started excavations at Mele Hairam in the same oasis, which revealed the remains of the Zoroastrian fire temple. In 2005-2006 she was a co-director of Irano-Polish Archaeological Mission in Sivand Dam Project (Iran), and after of Irano-Polish Archaeological Mission in Sabzewar, Iran (2007-2010). During that time she conducted excavations at Fire Temple in Khone-ye Div (Iran). In 2011, after the Mele Hairam excavation was finished in 2009, she started a project at Gurukly-depe located in Serakhs Oasis, Turkmenistan.

== Selected publications ==
- 1991. Das geflügelte Symbol in der Achämenidischen. Glyptik,” Archaeologische Mitteilungen aus Iran 24, 31–34.
- 1996. Sztuka Starożytnego Iranu, Wydawnictwa Uniwersytetu Warszawskiego, Warszawa.
- 1999. Открытие Храма Огня в Серахском Оазисе, Культурные Ценности. Международный Ежегодник. Cultural Values. International Annual, Vol. 1997–1998, 200–203.
- 2002. Zaratushtrian Temple of Fire. Five years of excavation at Mele Hairam, Warsaw.
- 2002. Un temple du feu Sassanide découvert à Mele Hairam, Turkmenistan Méridional, Studia Iranica 31, 215–230.
- 2007. Où adorer les dieux ? Dossiers d’Archéologie 371, 66–71.
