= Ian Stevens (footballer) =

Maltese footballer

Personal information
- Full name: Ian David Stevens
- Date of birth: 21 October 1966 (age 60)
- Place of birth: Valletta, Malta
- Height: 5 ft 11 in (1.80 m)
- Position: Striker

Youth career
- 1983–1984: Preston North End

Senior career*
Years	Team	Apps	(Gls)
1984–1986	Preston North End	11	(2)
1986	Stockport County	2	(0)
1986–1987	Lancaster City	?	(?)
1987–1991	Bolton Wanderers	47	(7)
1991–1994	Bury	110	(38)
1994–1997	Shrewsbury Town	111	(37)
1997–1999	Carlisle United	79	(27)
1999–2000	Wrexham	16	(4)
2000	→ Cheltenham Town (loan)	1	(0)
2000–2002	Carlisle United	67	(18)
2002–2003	Shrewsbury Town	19	(2)
2003	Barrow	?	(?)
2003–2005	Gretna	28	(10)
2005–2006	Fleetwood Town	?	(?)
2007	Lancaster City	?	(?)
2007–????	Bacup Borough	?	(?)
Total		491	(145)
- * Club domestic league appearances and goals

Ian David Stevens (born 21 October 1966) is a Maltese retired footballer. He was raised in Lancaster, England, and educated in the city at Ripley St. Thomas C of E High School.

== Playing career ==
=== Preston North End and Stockport County ===
Stevens was spotted by Preston North End while playing non-league football, Preston North End signed him as a professional in November 1984. His time at Deepdale was difficult however with the club going through a transitional period and at the end of the 1985–86 season he was released after playing just 12 games. After spending a month at Stockport County, Stevens found himself without a club and playing non-league football again for Lancaster City.

=== Bolton Wanderers ===
It was while playing for Lancaster that struggling Bolton Wanderers came in for him in March 1987. He was predominantly a squad player at Burnden Park due to the presence of strikers John Thomas and Tony Philliskirk. In a little over four years, he made 47 appearances scoring 7 goals. After being released by Wanderers in July 1991, Stevens signed for Bury.

=== Bury and Shrewsbury Town ===
At Bury, Stevens scored 40 goals in 126 games before signing with Shrewsbury Town in August 1994 for a fee of £20k. He scored 51 goals in 132 games before moving again to Carlisle United in May 1997.

=== Carlisle United ===
Although Stevens joined Carlisle on the back of the Cumbrians' promotion, the club were relegated immediately and only preserved their football league status the following season thanks to a goal from on loan goalkeeper Jimmy Glass.

=== Wrexham ===
Stevens took a free transfer to Wrexham in July 1999. In his only season at the Racecourse Ground, he scored four goals in 20 matches. He also played a game on loan at Cheltenham Town without scoring.

=== Carlisle United ===
Stevens' release from Wrexham in August 2000 paved the way for a return to Carlisle. However, in June 2002 he went for one last hurrah with Shrewsbury Town. In his one season at Gay Meadow he scored just two goals in 24 games before leaving in August 2003.

=== Gretna, non-league & back to Lancaster ===
Stevens first signed for Barrow but after a month he left and signed for Scottish Football League club Gretna. Despite getting sent off on his debut for Gretna, Stevens settled in well and in two seasons at Gretna he played 26+5 matches scoring 13 goals and was a member of the championship winning squad of 2004–05. From Gretna, Stevens moved again into non-league football with Fleetwood Town, winning promotion to the Northern Premier League in 2005–06. After a break he signed for his home town club Lancaster City for the start of 2007–08, but played just a handful more games for his home town club before leaving at the end of September 2007 and then signing for Bacup Borough. As a professional Stevens played 572 first team games and scored 175 goals.

== Honours ==
Shrewsbury Town

- Football League Trophy runner-up: 1995–96
