= Shaun Came =

English footballer

Personal information
- Full name: Shaun Raymond Came
- Date of birth: 15 June 1983 (age 43)
- Place of birth: Winsford, England
- Height: 6 ft 3 in (1.91 m)
- Position: Defender

Youth career
- 1999–2000: Macclesfield Town

Senior career*
Years	Team	Apps	(Gls)
2000–2002	Macclesfield Town	9	(0)
2002–2004	Northwich Victoria	28	(0)
2011–20??	Winsford United		
- * Club domestic league appearances and goals

Shaun Raymond Came (born 15 June 1983) is an English former professional footballer who played as a defender in the Football League for Macclesfield Town. He also played non-league football for clubs including Northwich Victoria and Winsford United. He is the son of former footballer Mark Came.
