= Jeff Chandler (footballer, born 1959) =

Footballer (born 1959)

Personal information
- Full name: Jeffrey George Chandler
- Date of birth: 19 June 1959 (age 67)
- Place of birth: Hammersmith, England
- Height: 5 ft 7 in (1.70 m)
- Position: Midfielder

Youth career
- Blackpool

Senior career*
Years	Team	Apps	(Gls)
1976–1979	Blackpool	37	(7)
1979–1981	Leeds United	26	(2)
1981–1985	Bolton Wanderers	157	(36)
1985–1987	Derby County	46	(9)
1987	→ Mansfield Town (loan)	6	(0)
1987–1989	Bolton Wanderers	24	(4)
1989–1990	Cardiff City	25	(1)

International career
1979	Republic of Ireland U21	1	(0)
1979	Republic of Ireland	2	(0)
- * Club domestic league appearances and goals

Jeffrey George Chandler (born 19 June 1959) is a former professional footballer who played as a midfielder, making over 300 appearances in the Football League. Born in England, he won two caps for the Republic of Ireland. He began his career as an apprentice with Blackpool and went on to break into the first-team before joining First Division side Leeds United in 1979 for a fee of £100,000. He spent two seasons with Leeds before moving to Bolton Wanderers in 1981. He later played for Derby County, Mansfield Town and Cardiff City before retiring due to a severe knee injury.

== Club career ==
=== Blackpool ===
Born in Hammersmith in London, Chandler had represented the West London schoolboys team when he was spotted by Dave Johnston, son of former England international Harry Johnston, who was working as a teacher at Chandler's school Rutherford in London. His teacher recommended him to Blackpool, who offered him a spot as an apprentice before eventually handing him his first professional contract in August 1976. He made his professional debut in September 1977 in a match against Blackburn Rovers.

His performances for the Tangerines saw him selected to represent the Republic of Ireland under-21 side during the 1979–80 season and his Blackpool manager Stan Ternent informed Chandler that a number of clubs had traveled to watch him play in the match. Following the match, Chandler was approached by Dave Blakey, who was working as a scout for Leeds United, and was told about the Yorkshire-based club's interest in signing him.

=== Leeds United ===
He traveled to Leeds several days later, in September 1979, to sign for the club for a fee of £100,000. Chandler had originally been told by manager Jimmy Adamson that he was regarded as "one for the future" at the club, but just two weeks after signing for the Whites, he was named in the matchday squad as a substitute in a match against Manchester City on 29 September 1979. During the match, Paul Madeley suffered a concussion and was unable to continue. Chandler was introduced as a substitute, making his debut for the club during a 2–1 defeat. After a second appearance as a substitute in a 2–1 defeat to Tottenham Hotspur, Chandler was handed his first start for the club in a 2–1 victory over Southampton. He made 17 appearances during his first season and scored twice, in matches against Tottenham Hostpur and West Bromwich Albion.

The following season, Adamson was replaced as manager by Allan Clarke. Chandler had injured his ankle just prior to Clarke's arrival, which kept him out for six weeks after the new manager's installment. Upon his return, Chandler was put straight into the first-team due to an injury to Arthur Graham, playing in a 2–1 defeat to Nottingham Forest on 22 October 1980. His lack of playing time meant he was severely short of match fitness and he struggled to complete the 90 minutes. He was dropped from the squad by Clarke for the following game and went to discuss his situation at the club with him, but Clarke told him, "When you've done what I've done in the game come back and see me. Until then turn around and get out!".

His relationship with Clarke quickly deteriorated and the pair rarely spoke. Out of contract at the end of the season, Chandler only appeared sporadically for the club for the remainder of the year. He was not offered a new deal at Elland Road by Clarke, but remained with the club's reserve side at the start of the 1981–82 season.

=== Later career ===
Chandler subsequently joined Bolton Wanderers in October 1981, becoming a first-team regular as the Trotters suffered relegation from the Second Division during his second season with the club. He thrived under manager John McGovern, who told Chandler that he was "the best player at the club". Between 1983 and 1985 Chandler scored 37 league goals, and finished as the club's second highest scorer in his final two seasons, behind Tony Caldwell. His form led Derby County to pay £38,000 to sign him in 1985 but, after two unsettled years at the Baseball Ground and a brief loan spell with Mansfield Town, he was persuaded to return to Bolton by manager Phil Neal for £20,000.

Bolton had been relegated to the Fourth Division for the first time in their history but went on to win promotion at the first attempt after finishing third during the 1987–88 season. However, Chandler played little part in the success, having suffered a serious knee injury after falling awkwardly whilst jumping to head a ball in only his fourth game of the season, a League Cup tie against Wigan Athletic. Although he was expected to miss the remainder of the season, he did return to make one appearance as a substitute in a match against Colchester United at the end of the season.

The following season, Chandler again suffered injury trouble and struggled to return to the same level he was playing at prior to his injury, later stating that he was "never the same player after that". He argued frequently with manager Neal which, along with his injuries, restricted his appearances; however, he did feature in the club's Associate Members Cup success, scoring a goal in a 4–1 win over Torquay United in the final.

He joined Cardiff City in November 1989 for a fee of £15,000 but, after appearing in just 28 games for the Bluebirds, he was forced to retire due to a knee injury in December 1990.

== International career ==
Eligible to represent the Republic of Ireland via his parentage, Chandler won one cap for the under-21 side in 1979. He made his debut for the senior side on 29 September 1979 as a substitute before being handed his first start one month later on 29 October, playing the first half of a 3–2 victory over the United States before being replaced by Paddy Mulligan.

== Later life ==
Following his retirement from football, Chandler worked in a number of different professions including advertising and as a double glazing salesman. He later worked in a care home for five years and obtained a diploma in counselling in his spare time. After working alongside youth offenders in Preston, he became a pupil welfare officer in Blackpool.

== Honours ==
Bolton Wanderers

- Associate Members' Cup: 1988–89

== See also ==
- List of Republic of Ireland international footballers born outside the Republic of Ireland
