= FourFourTwo (TV series) =

FourFourTwo is a thrice-weekly football magazine television show on Asian cable channel, Astro SuperSport, broadcasting to Malaysia and Brunei in association with global football magazine, FourFourTwo. In its third season, FourFourTwo has highlights from European leagues including England's Premier League, Spain's La Liga, Italian Serie A and the German Bundesliga. It is presented by former CNN and BBC anchor Jason Dasey and Malaysian-born anchor Adam Carruthers and co-hosted by Jay Menon, a former radio host. Its coverage of the Premier League includes a news update, fans segment and gossip section, with ex-England international Tony Cottee in London.

== Air times ==
FourFourTwo is a one-hour program that airs every Tuesday at 9.00pm on Astro SuperSport, with a second show – FourFourTwo: EuroZone – broadcast on Friday at 9.00pm on Astro SuperSport plus a third show, FourFourTwo: EuroGoals on Monday at 9.00pm. There are several repeats at other times of the week, including Saturday evenings before 'live' football. FourFourTwo initially started as a single 30-minute show on 11 August 2009 before expanding to 60-minutes in its ninth episode on 6 October 2009. The Tuesday edition celebrated its 100th episode on 25 November 2011.

== Guests ==
FourFourTwo has players and coaches, past and present, as studio experts, including former Australian striker Abbas Saad and ex-England international Peter Barnes. Other guests include former England international John Barnes and ex-Australian winger Scott Ollerenshaw.

== European Edition ==
The second version of FourFourTwo – EuroZone – began in August 2010. In the 2009–2010 season, FourFourTwo: Road to South Africa 2010 – provided previews for the 2010 FIFA World Cup. FourFourTwo – EuroZone has Real Madrid TV host Kay Murray as its La Liga correspondent and Nicky Bandini providing weekly updates on Serie A.

== EuroGoals Edition ==
A third version, FourFourTwo – EuroGoals, commenced in August 2011, providing a Monday night review of the weekend's continental action.

== FourFourTwo Performance ==
In 2012, Astro produced a new, monthly show, "FourFourTwo" Performance, based on the Performance section of the magazine. This has tips on training, diet, preparation and recovery from professional players in England and Europe. It is hosted by former Sydney FC midfielder Brendan Gan and certified fitness instructor Fay Hokulani.

== FourFourTwo Predictor ==
From the start of the 2010 FIFA World Cup, "FourFourTwo" introduced the FourFourTwo Predictor which provides stats, analysis and predictions of featured games, including matches in Astro's Premier League coverage. It is usually hosted by Jay Menon.

== See also ==
- Football Icon
