= Robbie Savage (footballer, born 1960) =

English footballer (born 1960)

Personal information
- Full name: Robert James Savage
- Date of birth: 8 January 1960 (age 66)
- Place of birth: Liverpool, England
- Height: 5 ft 7 in (1.70 m)
- Position: Midfielder

Youth career
- Liverpool

Senior career*
| Years | Team | Apps | (Gls) |
| 1978–1983 | Liverpool | 0 | (0) |
| 1982–1983 | → Wrexham (loan) | 27 | (10) |
| 1983 | Stoke City | 7 | (0) |
| 1983–1986 | AFC Bournemouth | 82 | (18) |
| 1986–1987 | Bradford City | 11 | (0) |
| 1987–1990 | Bolton Wanderers | 87 | (11) |
| – | Knowsley United | | |

Managerial career
- –: Knowsley United (player-manager)
- * Club domestic league appearances and goals

Robert James Savage (born 8 January 1960) is an English footballer who played as a midfielder in the Football League for Wrexham, Stoke City, AFC Bournemouth, Bradford City and Bolton Wanderers.

== Career ==
Savage was born in Liverpool, and began his football career with Liverpool, but never played a competitive game for their first team. He spent time on loan at Wrexham in 1982–83, then signed for Stoke City at the end of that season, but after making just seven appearances in the first four months of the 1983–84 season he moved on to AFC Bournemouth in December 1983. He was part of Harry Redknapp's Third Division side that beat Manchester United 2–0 to eliminate them from the 1983–84 FA Cup. He also played as Bournemouth won the inaugural Associate Members' Cup by beating Hull City in the final. After a short spell with Bradford City, Savage signed for Bolton Wanderers in September 1987 for a fee of £30,000.

He made his debut against Halifax Town on 12 September, and scored his first Bolton goal a week later at Torquay. On 7 May 1988 he scored the winning goal against his old club Wrexham to give Bolton promotion from the Fourth Division, and played on the winning side at Wembley in the Football League Trophy final in 1989, the second time he had won the tournament in his career. Savage's final professional appearance was on 7 April 1990, playing against Preston North End. During the match, he broke his leg, and was later forced to retire due to the injury. He became player-manager of Knowsley United. In 2006 Savage was working with Tranmere Rovers' Football in the Community scheme.

== Career statistics ==
| Club | Season | League | | | FA Cup | | League Cup | | Other^{[A]} | | Total | |
| Club | Season | Division | Apps | Goals | Apps | Goals | Apps | Goals | Apps | Goals | Apps | Goals |
|---|---|---|---|---|---|---|---|---|---|---|---|---|
| Liverpool | 1982–83 | First Division | 0 | 0 | 0 | 0 | 0 | 0 | 0 | 0 | 0 | 0 |
| Wrexham (loan) | 1982–83 | Third Division | 27 | 10 | 2 | 1 | 0 | 0 | 0 | 0 | 29 | 11 |
| Stoke City | 1983–84 | First Division | 7 | 0 | 0 | 0 | 0 | 0 | 0 | 0 | 7 | 0 |
| AFC Bournemouth | 1983–84 | Third Division | 23 | 5 | 2 | 0 | 0 | 0 | 5 | 3 | 30 | 8 |
| AFC Bournemouth | 1984–85 | Third Division | 43 | 9 | 5 | 3 | 1 | 0 | 5 | 0 | 54 | 12 |
| AFC Bournemouth | 1985–86 | Third Division | 0 | 0 | 0 | 0 | 0 | 0 | 0 | 0 | 0 | 0 |
| AFC Bournemouth | 1986–87 | Third Division | 16 | 4 | 2 | 0 | 2 | 0 | 0 | 0 | 20 | 4 |
| AFC Bournemouth | Total | | 82 | 18 | 9 | 3 | 3 | 0 | 10 | 3 | 104 | 24 |
| Bradford City | 1986–87 | Second Division | 8 | 0 | 0 | 0 | 0 | 0 | 0 | 0 | 8 | 0 |
| Bradford City | 1987–88 | Second Division | 3 | 0 | 0 | 0 | 0 | 0 | 0 | 0 | 3 | 0 |
| Bradford City | Total | | 11 | 0 | 0 | 0 | 0 | 0 | 0 | 0 | 9 | 0 |
| Bolton Wanderers | 1987–88 | Fourth Division | 39 | 5 | 2 | 0 | 0 | 0 | 3 | 0 | 44 | 5 |
| Bolton Wanderers | 1988–89 | Third Division | 38 | 6 | 1 | 0 | 1 | 0 | 6 | 1 | 46 | 7 |
| Bolton Wanderers | 1989–90 | Third Division | 10 | 0 | 0 | 0 | 2 | 1 | 0 | 0 | 12 | 1 |
| Bolton Wanderers | Total | | 87 | 11 | 3 | 0 | 3 | 1 | 9 | 1 | 102 | 13 |
| Career Total | | | 214 | 39 | 14 | 4 | 6 | 1 | 19 | 4 | 253 | 48 |

A. The "Other" column constitutes appearances and goals in the Football League Trophy.

== Honours ==
Bournemouth

- Associate Members' Cup: 1983–84

Bolton Wanderers

- Associate Members' Cup: 1988–89
