= 1978–79 Manchester City F.C. season =

English football club season

Manchester City
1978–79 season
- Manager: Tony Book
- Stadium: Maine Road
- First Division: 15th
- FA Cup: Fourth round
- Football League Cup: Quarter-finals
- UEFA Cup: Quarter-finals
- Top goalscorer: League: Mick Channon (11); All: Mick Channon (15)
- Highest home attendance: 46,710 vs Liverpool; 26 August 1978
- Lowest home attendance: 27,366 vs Birmingham City; 1 May 1979
- Average home league attendance: 36,210 (4th highest in league)

The 1978–79 season was Manchester City's 77th season of competitive football and 59th season in the top division of English football. In addition to the First Division, the club competed in the FA Cup, Football League Cup and the UEFA Cup.

== First Division ==
=== League table ===
Pos	Team	Pld	W	D	L	GF	GA	GD	Pts
13	Bristol City	42	15	10	17	47	51	−4	40
14	Southampton	42	12	16	14	47	53	−6	40
15	Manchester City	42	13	13	16	58	56	+2	39
16	Norwich City	42	7	23	12	51	57	−6	37
17	Bolton Wanderers	42	12	11	19	54	75	−21	35

Source: World Football
Rules for classification: 1) Points; 2) Goal difference; 3) Goals scored

=== Results summary ===
Overall								Home						Away					
Pld	W	D	L	GF	GA	GD	Pts	W	D	L	GF	GA	GD	W	D	L	GF	GA	GD
42	13	13	16	58	56	+2	39	9	5	7	34	28	+6	4	8	9	24	28	−4

==== Matches ====
Win	Draw	Loss

Date	Opponent	Venue	Result (Note: Manchester City’s score written first)	Scorers	Attendance
15 August 1978	Derby County	Away	1–1	Kidd	26,480
22 August 1978	Arsenal	Home	1–1	Kidd	39,506
26 August 1978	Liverpool	Home	1–4	Kidd	46,710
2 September 1978	Norwich City	Away	1–1	Channon	18,607
9 September 1978	Leeds United	Home	3–0	Palmer (2), Watson	40,125
16 September 1978	Chelsea	Away	4–1	Channon, R Futcher (3)	29,960
23 September 1978	Tottenham Hotspur	Home	2–0	Owen, R Futcher	43,472
30 September 1978	Manchester United	Away	0–1	-	55,317
7 October 1978	Birmingham City	Away	2–1	Tueart, Barnes	18,378
14 October 1978	Coventry City	Home	2–0	Owen (2)	36,723
21 October 1978	Bolton Wanderers	Away	2–2	Palmer, Owen	32,249
27 October 1978	West Bromwich Albion	Home	2–2	Channon, Hartford	40,521
4 November 1978	Aston Villa	Away	1–1	Owen	32,724
11 November 1978	Derby County	Home	1–2	Owen	37,376
18 November 1978	Liverpool	Away	0–1	-	47,765
25 November 1978	Ipswich Town	Home	1–2	Hartford	38,527
9 December 1978	Southampton	Home	1–2	Power	33,450
16 December 1978	Queens Park Rangers	Away	1–2	Channon	12,902
23 December 1978	Nottingham Forest	Home	0–0	-	37,012
26 December 1978	Everton	Away	0–1		46,996
30 December 1978	Bristol City	Away	1–1	R. Futcher	25,253
13 January 1979	Leeds United	Away	1–1	Kidd	36,303
20 January 1979	Chelsea	Home	2–3	Power, R.Futcher	31,876
3 February 1979	Tottenham Hotspur	Away	3–0	Kidd, Barnes, Channon	32,037
10 February 1979	Manchester United	Home	0–3	-	46,151
24 February 1979	Coventry City	Away	3–0	Channon (2), Kidd	20,115
27 February 1979	Norwich City	Home	2–2	Owen (2)	29,852
3 March 1979	Bolton Wanderers	Home	2–1	Channon, Owen	41,127
24 March 1979	Arsenal	Away	1–1	Channon	35,041
27 March 1979	Wolverhampton Wanderers	Away	1–1	Channon	19,998
31 March 1979	Ipswich Town	Away	1–2	Silkman	20,773
4 April 1979	West Bromwich Albion	Away	0–4	-	22,314
7 April 1979	Wolverhampton Wanderers	Home	3–1	Channon, Palmer, Silkman	32,298
14 April 1979	Everton	Home	0–0	-	39,771
17 April 1979	Middlesbrough	Away	0–2	-	19,676
21 April 1979	Queens Park Rangers	Home	3–1	Silkman, Owen (2)	30,694
24 April 1979	Middlesbrough	Home	1–0	Deyna	28,264
28 April 1979	Southampton	Away	0–1	-	19,744
1 May 1979	Birmingham City	Home	3–1	Power, Deyna (2)	27,366
5 May 1979	Bristol City	Home	2–0	Deyna, Hartford	29,739
9 May 1979	Nottingham Forest	Away	1–3	Lloyd (og)	21,104
15 May 1979	Aston Villa	Home	2–3	Deyna (2)	30,028

== FA Cup ==
Win	Draw	Loss

Round	Date	Opponent	Venue	Result	Scorers	Attendance
Third round	15 January 1979	Scunthorpe United	Home	0–0	Kidd	26,029
Third round replay	17 January 1979	Scunthorpe United	Away	4–2	Owen, Kidd (2), Barnes	13,758
Fourth round	25 January 1979	Shrewsbury Town	Away	0–2	-	14,215

== Football League Cup ==
Win	Draw	Loss

Round	Date	Opponent	Venue	Result	Scorers	Attendance
Second round	29 August 1978	Grimsby Town	Home	2–0	Moore (og), Palmer	21,481
Third round	4 October 1978	Blackpool	Away	1–1	Channon	18,886
Third round replay	10 October 1978	Blackpool	Home	3–0	Owen (2), Booth	26,213
Third round 2nd replay	8 November 1976	Luton Town F.C.	Neutral	3–2	Tueart, Channon, Kidd	13,043
Fourth round	8 November 1978	Norwich City	Away	3–1	Barnes, Channon (2)	19,413
Fifth round	13 December 1978	Southampton	Away	1–2	Nicholl (og)	21,523

== UEFA Cup ==
Win	Draw	Loss

Round	Date	Opponent	Venue	Result	Scorers	Attendance
First round 1st leg	13 September 1978	FC Twente	Away	1–1	Watson	12,000
First round 2nd leg	27 September 1978	FC Twente	Home	3–2	Wildschut (og), Kidd, Bell	29,330
Second round 1st leg	18 October 1978	Standard Liege	Home	4–0	Hartford, Kidd (2), Palmer	27,489
Second round 2nd leg	1 November 1978	Standard Liege	Away	0–2	Sigurvinsson	25,000
Third round 1st leg	23 November 1978	AC Milan	Away	2–2	Kidd, Power	40,000
Third round 2nd leg	6 December 1978	AC Milan	Home	3–0	Booth, Hartford, Kidd	38,026
Quarter Final 1st leg	7 March 1979	Borussia Monchengladbach	Home	1–1	Channon	39,005
Quarter final 2nd leg	20 March 1979	Borussia Monchengladbach	Away	1–3	Deyna	30,000
