= 1977–78 Manchester City F.C. season =

English football club season

Manchester City
1977–78 season
- Manager: Tony Book
- Stadium: Maine Road
- First Division: 4th
- FA Cup: Fourth Round
- Football League Cup: Fifth Round
- UEFA Cup: First Round
- Top goalscorer: League: Brian Kidd (16); All: Brian Kidd (20)
- Highest home attendance: 50,857 vs Manchester United; 10 September 1977
- Lowest home attendance: 32,412 vs Coventry City; 25 April 1978
- Average home league attendance: 41,687 (3rd highest in league)

The 1977–78 season was Manchester City's 76th season of competitive football and 58th season in the top division of English football. In addition to the First Division, the club competed in the FA Cup, Football League Cup and the UEFA Cup. The club finished fourth in the league. It was the first time City finished in the top 4 of the top flight in consecutive seasons since 1904–05.

== First Division ==
=== League table ===
Pos	Team	Pld	W	D	L	GF	GA	GD	Pts	Qualification or relegation
2	Liverpool	42	24	9	9	65	34	+31	57	Qualification for the European Cup first round (Note: Liverpool qualified for the European Cup first round as the 1977–78 European Cup winners.)
3	Everton	42	22	11	9	76	45	+31	55	Qualification for the UEFA Cup first round
4	Manchester City	42	20	12	10	74	51	+23	52	Qualification for the UEFA Cup first round
5	Arsenal	42	21	10	11	60	37	+23	52	Qualification for the UEFA Cup first round
6	West Bromwich Albion	42	18	14	10	62	53	+9	50	Qualification for the UEFA Cup first round

Source: World Football
Rules for classification: 1) Points; 2) Goal difference; 3) Goals scored

=== Results summary ===
Overall								Home						Away					
Pld	W	D	L	GF	GA	GD	Pts	W	D	L	GF	GA	GD	W	D	L	GF	GA	GD
42	20	12	10	74	51	+23	52	14	4	3	46	21	+25	6	8	7	28	30	−2

==== Matches ====
Win	Draw	Loss

Date	Opponent	Venue	Result (Note: Manchester City’s score written first)	Scorers	Attendance
20 August 1977	Leicester City	Home	0–0		45,963
24 August 1977	Aston Villa	Away	4–1	Tueart (3), Booth	40,121
27 August 1977	West Ham United	Away	1–0	Royle	25,278
3 September 1977	Norwich City	Home	4–0	Channon (2), Power, Hartford	41,269
10 September 1977	Manchester United	Home	3–1	Kidd (2), Channon	50,856
17 September 1977	Queens Park Rangers	Away	1–1	Royle	24,668
24 September 1977	Bristol City	Home	2–0	Barnes, Owen	41,897
1 October 1977	Everton	Away	1–1	Hartford	43,286
4 October 1977	Coventry City	Away	2–4	Tueart, Barnes	19,650
8 October 1977	Arsenal	Home	2–1	Barnes, Tueart (pen)	43,177
15 October 1977	Nottingham Forest	Away	1–2	Kidd	35,572
22 October 1977	Wolverhampton Wanderers	Home	0–2		42,730
29 October 1977	Liverpool	Home	3–1	Kidd, Channon, Royle	49,207
5 November 1977	Ipswich Town	Away	0–1	-	23,636
12 November 1977	Leeds United	Home	2–3	Channon, Barnes	42,651
19 November 1977	West Bromwich Albion	Away	0–0	-	27,159
26 November 1977	Chelsea	Home	6–2	Wilkins (og), Tueart (3), Channon, Barnes	34,345
3 December 1977	Derby County	Away	1–2	Power	26,888
10 December 1977	Birmingham City	Home	3–0	Tueart, Owen, Channon	36,671
17 December 1977	Leeds United	Away	0–2		37,380
26 December 1977	Newcastle United	Home	4–0	Tueart (3), Kidd	45,811
27 December 1977	Middlesbrough	Away	2–0	Hartford, Owen	26,879
31 December 1977	Aston Villa	Home	2–0	Barnes, Kidd	46,074
2 January 1978	Leicester	Away	1–0	Owen	24,041
14 January 1978	West Ham United	Home	3–2	Kidd, Booth, Barnes	47,171
21 January 1978	Norwich City	Away	3–1	Kidd (2), Owen	20,397
12 February 1978	Queens Park Rangers	Home	2–1	Channon, Bell	39,860
17 February 1978	Bristol City	Away	2–2	Kidd, Booth	25,834
25 February 1978	Everton	Home	1–0	Kidd	46,817
4 March 1978	Arsenal	Away	0–3	-	34,003
15 March 1978	Manchester United	Away	2–2	Barnes, Kidd	58,426
18 March 1978	Wolverhampton Wanderers	Away	1–1	Bell	20,583
25 March 1978	Middlesbrough	Home	2–2	Channon (2)	37,944
29 March 1978	Newcastle United	Away	2–2	Palmer (2)	20,246
1 April 1978	Ipswich Town	Home	2–1	Palmer, Channon	34,975
11 April 1978	Nottingham Forest	Home	0–0		43,428
15 April 1978	West Bromwich Albion	Away	1–3	Kidd	36,521
22 April 1978	Birmingham City	Away	4–1	Owen, Kidd (2), Power	25,294
25 April 1978	Coventry City	Home	3–1	Kidd, Hartford, Owen	32,412
29 April 1978	Derby County	Home	1–1	Channon	37,175
1 May 1978	Liverpool	Away	0–4	-	44,528
5 May 1978	Chelsea	Away	0–0	-	18,782

== FA Cup ==
Win	Draw	Loss

Round	Date	Opponent	Venue	Result	Scorers	Attendance
Third round	7 January 1978	Leeds United	Away	2–1	Tueart, Barnes	38,516
Fourth round	31 January 1978	Nottingham Forest	Away	1–2	Kidd	38,509

== Football League Cup ==
Win	Draw	Loss

Round	Date	Opponent	Venue	Result	Scorers	Attendance
Second round	31 August 1977	Chesterfield	Away	1–0	Kidd	14,282
Third round	25 October 1977	Luton Town	Away	1–1	Barnes	16,443
Third round replay	1 November 1977	Luton Town	Home	0–0	Barnes	28,254
Third round 2nd replay	8 November 1976	Luton Town F.C.	Neutral	3–2	Tueart, Channon, Kidd	13,043
Fourth round	29 November 1977	Ipswich Town	Away	2–1	Kidd, Tueart	22,645
Fifth round	18 January 1978	Arsenal	Home	0–0	-	42,435
Fifth round replay	24 January 1978	Arsenal	Away	0–1	-	57,748

== UEFA Cup ==
Win	Draw	Loss

Round	Date	Opponent	Venue	Result	Scorers	Attendance
First round 1st leg	14 September 1977	Widzew Łódź	Home	2–2	Barnes, Channon	33,695
First round 2nd leg	28 September 1977	Widzew Łódź	Away	0–0		40,000
