= 1976–77 Manchester City F.C. season =

English football club season

Manchester City
1976–77 season
- Manager: Tony Book
- Stadium: Maine Road
- First Division: 2nd
- FA Cup: Fifth Round
- Football League Cup: Second Round
- UEFA Cup: First Round
- Tennent Caledonian Cup: Third
- Top goalscorer: League: Brian Kidd(21); All: Brian Kidd(23)
- Highest home attendance: 50,020 vs Liverpool; 29 December 1976
- Lowest home attendance: 32,527 vs Coventry City; 18 December 1976
- Average home league attendance: 39,683 (3rd highest in league)

The 1976–77 season was Manchester City's 75th season of competitive football and 57th season in the top division of English football. In addition to the First Division, the club competed in the FA Cup, Football League Cup, UEFA Cup and the Tennent Caledonian Cup. City finished 2nd, one point behind champions Liverpool. It was the first time City finished in the top 2 of a league season since they won it in 1968.

== First Division ==
=== League table ===
Pos	Team	Pld	W	D	L	GF	GA	GD	Pts	Qualification or relegation
1	Liverpool (C)	42	23	11	8	62	33	+29	57	Qualification for the European Cup second round
2	Manchester City	42	21	14	7	60	34	+26	56	Qualification for the UEFA Cup first round
3	Ipswich Town	42	22	8	12	66	39	+27	52	Qualification for the UEFA Cup first round
4	Aston Villa	42	22	7	13	76	50	+26	51	Qualification for the UEFA Cup first round
5	Newcastle United	42	18	13	11	64	49	+15	49	Qualification for the UEFA Cup first round

Source: World Football
Rules for classification: 1) Points; 2) Goal difference; 3) Goals scored
(C) Champions

=== Results summary ===
Overall								Home						Away					
Pld	W	D	L	GF	GA	GD	Pts	W	D	L	GF	GA	GD	W	D	L	GF	GA	GD
42	21	14	7	60	34	+26	56	15	5	1	38	13	+25	6	9	6	22	21	+1

==== Matches ====
Win	Draw	Loss

Date	Opponent	Venue	Result (Note: Manchester City’s score written first)	Scorers	Attendance
21 August 1976	Leicester City	Away	2–2	Tueart, Royle	22,612
25 August 1976	Aston Villa	Home	2–0	Tueart, Watson	41,007
28 August 1976	Stoke City	Home	0–0	—	39,878
4 September 1976	Arsenal	Away	0–0	-	35,132
11 September 1976	Bristol City	Home	2–1	Tueart, Barnes	35,891
18 September 1976	Sunderland	Away	2–0	Tueart, Royle	37,595
25 September 1976	Manchester United	Home	1–3	Tueart	48,861
2 October 1976	West Ham United	Home	4–2	Owen, Tueart 2, Hartford	37,795
5 October 1976	Everton	Away	2–2	Hartford, Power	31,370
16 October 1976	Queens Park Rangers	Home	0–0		40,751
23 October 1976	Ipswich Town	Away	0–1	—	25,041
30 October 1976	Norwich City	Away	2–0	Kidd, Royle	22,861
6 November 1976	Newcastle United	Home	0–0	-	40,049
20 November 1976	West Bromwich Albion	Home	1–0	Tueart	36,656
27 November 1976	Birmingham City	Away	0–0	-	29,722
4 December 1976	Derby County	Home	3–2	Kidd, Tueart	34,178
7 December 1976	Middlesbrough	Away	0–0	-	18,000
11 December 1976	Tottenham Hotspur	Away	2–2	Kidd, Power	34,608
18 December 1976	Coventry City	Home	2–0	Kidd, Tueart	32,527
27 December 1976	Leeds United	Away	2–0	Kidd (2)	48,708
29 December 1976	Liverpool	Home	1–1	Royle	50,020
21 January 1977	Leicester City	Home	5–0	Kidd (4), Doyle	37,609
5 February 1977	Stoke City	Away	2–0	Tueart, Royle	27,039
12 February 1977	Arsenal	Home	1–0	Royle	45,368
16 February 1977	Newcastle United	Away	2–2	Tueart, Kidd	27,920
19 February 1977	Bristol City	Away	0–1	-	27,018
1 March 1977	Norwich City	Home	2–0	Tueart (2)	36,021
5 March 1977	Manchester United	Away	1–3	Royle	58,595
9 March 1977	Sunderland	Home	1–0	Tueart	44,439
12 March 1977	West Ham United	Away	0–1	-	24,974
22 March 1977	Queens Park Rangers	Away	0–0	Charlton	17,619
2 April 1977	Ipswich Town	Home	2–1	Kidd, Watson	42,780
8 April 1977	Leeds United	Home	2–1	Kidd (2)	47,727
9 April 1977	Liverpool	Away	1–2	Kidd	55,283
12 April 1977	Middlesbrough	Home	1–0	Hartford	37,735
16 April 1977	West Bromwich Albion	Away	0–2	Tueart, Kidd	24,889
19 April 1977	Birmingham City	Home	2–1	Kidd (2)	36,203
30 April 1977	Derby County	Away	0–4		29,127
4 May 1977	Aston Villa	Away	1–1	Tueart	36,190
7 May 1977	Tottenham Hotspur	Home	5–0	Booth, Tueart, Barnes, Hartford, Kidd	37,919
10 May 1977	Everton	Home	1–1	Kidd	38,004
14 May 1977	Coventry City	Away	1–0	Conway	21,429

== FA Cup ==
=== Results ===
Date	Round	Opponents	H / A	Venue	Result F – A	Scorers	Attendance
8 January 1977	3rd Round	West Bromwich Albion	H	Maine Road	1–1	Kidd	38,195
11 January 1977	3rd Round Replay	West Bromwich Albion	A	The Hawthorns	1–0	Royle	26,494
29 January 1977	4th Round	Newcastle United	A	St James Park	3–1	Craig (og), Royle, Owen	45,300
26 February 1977	5th Round	Leeds United	A	Elland Road	0–1		47,731

== Football League Cup ==
=== Results ===
Date	Round	Opponents	H / A	Venue	Result F – A	Scorers	Attendance
1 September 1976	2nd Round	Aston Villa	A	Villa Park	0–3		34,585

== UEFA Cup ==
=== Results ===
Date	Round	Opponents	H / A	Venue	Result F – A	Scorers	Attendance
15 September 1976	1st Round 1st leg	Juventus	H	Maine Road	1–0	Kidd	36,955
29 September 1976	1st Round 2nd leg	Juventus	A	Stadio Olimpico Grande Torino	0–2		55,000
