= 1974–75 Manchester City F.C. season =

English football club season

Manchester City
1974–75 season
- Manager: Tony Book
- Stadium: Maine Road
- First Division: 8th
- FA Cup: Third Round
- League Cup: Third Round
- Texaco Cup: Group Stage
- Top goalscorer: League: Colin Bell(15); All: Colin Bell(18)
- Highest home attendance: 45,194 vs Liverpool; 14 September 1974
- Lowest home attendance: 14,790 vs Scunthorpe United; 10 September 1974
- Average home league attendance: 32,864 (5th highest in league)

The 1974–75 season was Manchester City's 73rd season of competitive football and 55th season in the top division of English football. In addition to the First Division, the club competed in the FA Cup, Football League Cup and the Texaco Cup.

== First Division ==
=== League table ===
Pos	Team	Pld	W	D	L	GF	GA	GAv	Pts
6	Sheffield United	42	18	13	11	58	51	1.137	49
7	Middlesbrough	42	18	12	12	54	40	1.350	48
8	Manchester City	42	18	10	14	54	54	1.000	46
9	Leeds United	42	16	13	13	57	49	1.163	45
10	Burnley	42	17	11	14	68	67	1.015	45

Source: World Football
Rules for classification: 1) Points; 2) Goal average; 3) Goals scored

=== Results summary ===
Overall								Home						Away					
Pld	W	D	L	GF	GA	GAv	Pts	W	D	L	GF	GA	Pts	W	D	L	GF	GA	Pts
42	18	10	14	54	54	1	46	16	3	2	40	15	35	2	7	12	14	39	11

=== Results ===
Date	Opponents	H / A	Venue	Result F–A	Scorers	Attendance
17 August 1974	West Ham United	H	Maine Road	4–0	Tueart, Marsh (2), Doyle	30,240
21 August 1974	Tottenham Hotspur	H	Maine Road	1–0	Hartford	31,549
24 August 1974	Arsenal	A	Highbury	0–4		27,143
28 August 1974	Tottenham Hotspur	A	White Hart Lane	2–1	Bell, Booth	20,079
31 August 1974	Leeds United	H	Maine Road	2–1	Summerbee, Bell	37,919
7 September 1974	Coventry City	A	Highfield Road	2–2	Marsh, Oakes	15,440
14 September 1974	Liverpool	H	Maine Road	2–0	Marsh, Tueart	45,194
21 September 1974	Middlesbrough	A	Ayresome Park	0–3		30,256
24 September 1974	Carlisle United	A	Brunton Park	0–0		17,900
28 September 1974	Queens Park Rangers	H	Maine Road	1–0	Marsh	30,674
5 October 1974	Chelsea	H	Maine Road	1–1	Hutchinson	32,412
12 October 1974	Burnley	A	Turf Moor	1–2	Tueart	23,406
16 October 1974	Arsenal	H	Maine Road	2–1	Tueart (2)	26,658
19 October 1974	Luton Town	H	Maine Road	1–0	Summerbee	30,649
26 October 1974	Ipswich Town	A	Portman Road	1–1	Bell	25,171
2 November 1974	Everton	A	Goodison Park	0–2		43,905
9 November 1974	Stoke City	H	Maine Road	1–0	Marsh	36,966
16 November 1974	Birmingham City	A	St Andrews	0–4		35,143
23 November 1974	Leicester City	H	Maine Road	4–1	Tueart, Daniels (2), Bell	31,628
30 November 1974	Newcastle United	A	St James Park	1–2	Marsh	36,600
7 December 1974	Sheffield United	H	Maine Road	3–2	Hammond, Bell, Marsh	29,676
14 December 1974	West Ham United	A	Boleyn Ground	0–0		33,908
21 December 1974	Wolverhampton Wanderers	H	Maine Road	0–0		29,326
26 December 1974	Liverpool	A	Anfield	1–4	Bell	46,062
28 December 1974	Derby County	H	Maine Road	1–2	Bell	40,180
18 January 1975	Newcastle United	H	Maine Road	5–1	Hammond, Tueart (3), Bell	32,021
24 January 1975	Bristol City	A	Ashton Gate	2–2	Tueart, Bell	5,870
1 February 1975	Stoke City	A	Victoria Ground	0–4		32,007
8 February 1975	Everton	H	Maine Road	2–1	Bell, Tueart	44,718
22 February 1975	Birmingham City	H	Maine Road	3–1	Royle, Tueart, Bell	34,240
1 March 1975	Leeds United	A	Elland Road	2–2	Oakes, Donachie	47,489
8 March 1975	Leicester City	A	Filbert Street	0–1		23,059
15 March 1975	Queens Park Rangers	A	Loftus Road	0–2		22,102
18 March 1975	Carlisle United	H	Maine Road	1–2	Barnes	24,047
22 March 1975	Coventry City	H	Maine Road	1–0	Tueart	25,903
28 March 1975	Middlesbrough	H	Maine Road	2–1	Marsh, Bell	37,772
29 March 1975	Wolverhampton Wanderers	A	Molineux Stadium	0–1		21,716
1 April 1975	Derby County	A	Baseball Ground	1–2	Bell	32,966
12 April 1975	Chelsea	A	Stamford Bridge	1–0	Hartford	26,249
19 April 1975	Burnley	H	Maine Road	2–0	Bell, Tueart	30,723
23 April 1975	Ipswich Town	H	Maine Road	1–1	Bell	23,391
26 April 1975	Luton Town	A	Kenilworth Road	1–1	Tueart	20,768

== FA Cup ==
=== Results ===
Date	Round	Opponents	H / A	Venue	Result F–A	Scorers	Attendance
4 January 1975	3rd Round	Newcastle United	H	Maine Road	0–2		37,625

== Football League Cup ==
=== Results ===
Date	Round	Opponents	H / A	Venue	Result F–A	Scorers	Attendance
10 September 1974	2nd Round	Scunthorpe United	H	Maine Road	6–0	Bell (3), Doyle, Marsh, Barrett	14,790
9 October 1974	3rd Round	Manchester United	A	Old Trafford	0–1		55,225

== Awards ==
=== PFA Team of the Year ===
Pos	Player
MF	(England) Colin Bell
