= Mark Came =

English footballer and manager

Personal information
- Full name: Mark Raymond Came
- Date of birth: 14 September 1961 (age 65)
- Place of birth: Exeter, England
- Height: 6 ft 1 in (1.85 m)
- Position: Defender

Senior career*
Years	Team	Apps	(Gls)
–1982	Middlewich Athletic		
1982	Nantwich Town	7	(1)
1982–1984	Winsford United		
1984–1992	Bolton Wanderers	195	(7)
1992–1994	Chester City	47	(1)
1994–1996	Exeter City	70	(5)
1996–1998	Winsford United		

Managerial career
- 1999: Winsford United
- 2006–2008: Barnton
- * Club domestic league appearances and goals

Mark Raymond Came (born 14 September 1961) is an English former professional footballer who made more than 300 Football League appearances for Bolton Wanderers, Chester City and Exeter City. He is now manager of non-league side Barnton.

Came began his playing career with Middlewich Athletic and joined Nantwich Town in October 1982. He soon moved on to Winsford United, who he played for until Bolton Wanderers gave him his first Football League chance when they signed him in April 1984. Came became a regular for Wanderers over the next four years, winning promotion from Division Four in 1987–88. But a broken leg early in the 1988–89 season after a tackle by Chester City's striker Ian Benjamin ruled him out for more than a year thus ending interest in him by Arsenal, Ipswich Town and Everton. After this Came struggled to re-establish himself in the Bolton side and in December 1992 he ironically moved across the north-west to Chester.

Although Came was unable to save Chester from relegation to Division Three in his first season with the club, he helped them to win promotion straight back the following season. The campaign memorably saw him deputise in goal for nearly the entire 90 minutes away at Scarborough after regular goalkeeper Billy Stewart suffered an injury in the warm-up. Came kept a clean sheet as Chester won 1–0 and he struck up a solid central defensive pairing with Colin Greenall as City sealed the runners-up spot.

But in July 1994 Came opted to remain in Division Three by joining Exeter City, where he won player of the season in his two years with the Grecians. This marked the end of his professional career, as he made a surprise return to Winsford. He played for Winsford until retiring through injury in December 1998, but he remained involved at the club and was appointed manager for the 1999–2000 season.

Came was appointed manager of Cheshire side Barnton in January 2006. He remained in charge before resigning in January 2008.

His son Shaun Came has played professionally for Macclesfield Town.

His grandson currently plays for Norwich City Academy.

== Honours ==
Bolton Wanderers

- Associate Members' Cup runner-up: 1985–86
