= Charles Greene Came =

American politician

Charles Greene Came (September 26, 1826 – January 16, 1879) was an American lawyer, newspaper editor, and politician.

Came was born in Buxton, Maine.

He graduated from Yale College in 1849. After graduation he studied law in Portland, Maine, being occupied a part of the time in teaching and in editorial work. On his admission to the bar, in October 1852, he began the practice of law in Rockland, Maine, but in September of the next year returned to Portland, where for two years he acted as assistant editor of the Portland Advertiser while also practicing his profession. During this time he was twice a member of the House of Representatives of Maine. In July 1855, he became editor-in-chief of the Advertiser, a position which he held until May 1857, when he accepted a position as associate editor of the Boston Journal, which he retained to the time of his death.

He was married, in September 1855, to Sarah M. Lewis, of New Haven, who died after a long and painful illness in 1877. Soon after her death his health began to fail, and for the last few months he was confined to his house in Boston, where he died, January 16, 1879, at the age of 52. Of his four children, two daughter and a son survived him.
