= John Thomas (footballer, born 1958) =

English footballer

Personal information
- Full name: John William Thomas
- Date of birth: 5 August 1958 (age 68)
- Place of birth: Wednesbury, England
- Height: 5 ft 8 in (1.73 m)
- Position: Striker

Youth career
- 1974–1976: Everton

Senior career*
Years	Team	Apps	(Gls)
1976–1980	Everton	0	(0)
1979	→ Tranmere Rovers (loan)	11	(2)
1980	→ Halifax Town (loan)	5	(0)
1980–1982	Bolton Wanderers	22	(6)
1982–1983	Chester	44	(20)
1983–1985	Lincoln City	67	(18)
1985–1987	Preston North End	78	(38)
1987–1989	Bolton Wanderers	73	(31)
1989–1990	West Bromwich Albion	19	(1)
1990–1992	Preston North End	27	(5)
1992	Hartlepool United	7	(1)
1992–1993	Halifax Town	12	(0)
1993–1994	Bamber Bridge		
Total		365	(123)
- * Club domestic league appearances and goals

John William Thomas (born 5 August 1958) is an English former professional footballer. He scored 123 goals in 364 appearances while playing for the Football League with the Tranmere Rovers, Halifax Town, Bolton Wanderers, Chester, Lincoln City, Preston North End, Bolton Wanderers and Hartlepool United.

== Playing career ==
=== Everton ===
Born in Wednesbury in 1958, John Thomas signed with Everton as a trainee after he left school in 1974. During his six years at the club, he did not appear once, except for two years, one with Tranmere Rovers (11 games, 2 goals) in 1978–79 season and also with Halifax Town (5 games, 0 goals) the following season showed that John was capable of playing in the football league.

=== Bolton Wanderers ===
After Everton released him at the end of the 1979–80 season, John signed for newly relegated Bolton Wanderers hoping to cement a regular place in the starting line-up and thus kick starting his career.

=== Chester and Lincoln City ===
After Bolton gave John a free transfer he signed in July 1982 for fourth-division team Chester. In his only season at Sealand Road, John became a fan favourite, finishing as the club's top scorer with 20 goals in 44 league games. He was also voted Chester's player of the season. It was, however, a shock to the club's fans when the cash-strapped club were forced to sell him to Division Three side Lincoln City for £22,000 after just one season.

His time with The Imps has mixed results with John struggling to find the net with any regularity. Although in his two seasons with the club he scored 18 times in 67 games, it came as no surprise when at the end 1984-85 season, they decided to cash in by selling him to recently relegated Preston North End for £15,000. In his last game for Lincoln he was to witness a nightmare when 56 spectators were killed in a horrendous stand fire while playing Bradford City.

=== Preston North End ===
John's stay at Preston started badly, for although John was scoring regularly and forming a potent strike partnership with Gary Brazil, the team as a whole were underperforming, finishing the 1985-86 season in 91st position, therefore having to apply for re-election. John personally however did finish the season successfully by picking up the club's official player of the year award for 1985–86.

The following season went very differently, as with a new artificial pitch laid and John McGrath at the helm, Preston stormed to promotion with John finishing the season as the club's leading scorer. The rumor, however, of a fall out with manager McGrath only intensified with Thomas being dropped several times during the season to be replaced by the likes of Nigel Jemson, Frank Worthington and Steve Taylor. He did regain his place in the team every time, though, ending the season with 28 goals. At the end of his contract in July 1987, he was sold to Bolton Wanderers for £30,000 after finding the net 38 times in 78 games.

=== Return to Bolton Wanderers and West Bromwich Albion ===
His second spell at Bolton was far more successful than his first. In 1987–88 Thomas enjoyed his second successive Division Four promotion, before a comfortable mid-table finish in Division Three the following season. He played on the winning side at Wembley in 1989 in the Football League Trophy final. He was club top-scorer in both seasons, scoring 31 times in 73 games before deciding in July 1989 to sign for his boyhood heroes West Bromwich Albion on a free transfer.

John however spent the majority of his short stay at The Hawthorns on the bench, managing 1 goal in 19 games, although he did score a hat-trick in a 5–3 victory for the Baggies in a Football League Cup tie against Bradford City at Valley Parade. Soon after, however, the call came from struggling Preston in February 1990.

=== Return to Preston North End ===
After signing for £50,000 and helping North End to avoid relegation, hopes for the following season were high but were dashed by a broken leg on his return to Bolton Wanderers.

After recovering from his injury, John Thomas struggled to reach the same level again, and after just 27 more games and another six goals, he was transferred to fellow Division Three side Hartlepool United in March 1992. One goal in seven games was all John could manage at United before they, in turn, released him in the summer. John managed one final spell at Halifax Town (12 games, 0 goals) in 1992-93 season where he teamed up again with John McGrath, with the club destined for relegation out of the Football League.

This also marked the end of John's professional playing career, as he went on to join non-league sides Bamber Bridge. In a career spanning 17 years, John Thomas played 365 league games scoring 123 goals. He is still held in high regard by fans of Preston, Bolton and Chester, the three clubs who benefited most from his goalscoring ability. He now lives in Lostock, Bolton and works as a sports equipment sales executive.

== Honours ==
Bolton Wanderers

- Associate Members' Cup: 1988–89
