= 1981–82 in English football =

Football in England
- Season: 1981–82

Men's football
- First Division: Liverpool
- Second Division: Luton Town
- Third Division: Burnley
- Fourth Division: Sheffield United
- Alliance Premier League: Runcorn
- FA Cup: Tottenham Hotspur
- Football League Group Cup: Grimsby Town
- League Cup: Liverpool
- Charity Shield: Shared between Aston Villa and Tottenham Hotspur

The 1981–82 season was the 102nd season of competitive football in England. It was also the first season that the three-points-for-a-win system was introduced.

== Diary of the season ==
13 July 1981: Everton sign 22-year-old goalkeeper Neville Southall from Bury for £150,000.

19 August 1981: Brighton & Hove Albion sign Liverpool midfielder Jimmy Case for £350,000.

22 August 1981: Aston Villa & Tottenham Hotspur draw 2–2 in the FA Charity Shield at Wembley.

29 August 1981: The first Football League games of the season are played. Swansea City begin life as a First Division side on a high note by beating Leeds United 5–1. Promoted Notts County win 1–0 at Villa Park against defending champions Aston Villa. Howard Kendall begins his career as Everton manager by guiding them to a 3–1 win over Birmingham City. Liverpool lose 1–0 to Wolverhampton Wanderers.

9 September 1981: England suffer a shock 2–1 defeat away to Norway in a qualifier for the World Cup.

19 September 1981: Alan Brazil scores twice as Ipswich Town beat Notts County for 4–1 at Meadow Lane, while Liverpool and Aston Villa draw 0–0.

29 September 1981: Legendary former Liverpool manager Bill Shankly, 68, dies from a heart attack three days after being admitted to hospital.

30 September 1981: The month ends with Ipswich Town leading the First Division. Newly promoted West Ham United and Swansea City are their nearest challengers, with Nottingham Forest completing the top four, but champions Aston Villa are struggling with just one win from seven games. Leeds United are already adrift at the bottom of the table following a horrific start to the season, with Sunderland and, surprisingly, West Bromwich Albion also in the bottom three. The race for a place in next season's First Division is headed by Sheffield Wednesday, Luton Town and Norwich City. In the UEFA Cup, Liverpool beat Finnish league champions Oulun Palloseura 7–0 at Anfield to complete an 8–0 aggregate first leg triumph, with 19-year-old striker Ian Rush scoring his first senior goal for the club.

1 October 1981: Manchester United pay a national record fee of £1.5 million for West Bromwich Albion midfielder Bryan Robson.

7 October 1981: Ian Rush scores his first domestic goals for Liverpool, finding the net twice in their second round first leg League Cup 5–0 win over Exeter City at Anfield.

27 October 1981: First Division clubs Notts County and Swansea City are eliminated from the League Cup by lower league opposition: Division Three's Lincoln City despatch the Nottingham club while the Welsh were beaten by Barnsley of the Second Division.

31 October 1981: Manchester United finish October as First Division leaders, although Ipswich Town are level on points with them, and have two games in hand. Tottenham Hotspur, Swansea City, Nottingham Forest and West Ham United are also amongst the front-runners. Sunderland, Wolverhampton Wanderers and Middlesbrough occupy the relegation places. Luton Town's recent excellent form has taken them to the top of the Second Division, heading a promotion race in which Watford stand second and Sheffield Wednesday are third.

4 November 1981: Fourth Division side York City sack manager Barry Lyons, following a poor start to the season on top of last year's bottom-place finish, and replace him with Kevin Randall.

18 November 1981: England seal qualification for the World Cup with a 1–0 win over Hungary at Wembley in their final qualifying game.

30 November 1981: November draws to a close with Manchester United still top of the First Division, though Swansea City are two points behind them with a game in hand. Ipswich Town and Tottenham Hotspur are still pushing them hard, as are Southampton, Nottingham Forest and West Ham United. Sunderland, Middlesbrough and Birmingham City occupy the relegation places, while defending champions Aston Villa are 13th in the league and Liverpool are 10th. Luton Town continue to head the Second Division promotion race, with Watford and Queens Park Rangers completing the top three.

15 December 1981: Swansea City go top of the First Division after beating Aston Villa 2–1.

16 December 1981: The Football Association bans Chelsea supporters from visiting away grounds for the remainder of the season in response to an incident by travelling Chelsea fans at Derby County.

31 December 1981: The year draws to a close with Manchester City top of the First Division. However, just two points separate the top five places, with Southampton, Swansea City, Manchester United and Ipswich Town in close pursuit. Luton Town remain the runaway leaders of the Second Division, while Oldham Athletic have muscled into second place, with Watford third.

2 January 1982: Holders Tottenham Hotspur beat Arsenal 1–0 in the North London derby in the FA Cup third round. Liverpool beat Swansea City 4–0, while Manchester United are beaten 1–0 by Second Division Watford.

8 January 1982: John Barnwell resigns as manager of Wolverhampton Wanderers, whose fortunes have declined sharply in the two years since he took them to sixth place in the First Division and a League Cup victory.

23 January 1982: Third Division Oxford United cause the shock of the FA Cup fourth round with a 3–0 win away to Brighton & Hove Albion. Watford claim another First Division victim, beating West Ham United 2–0.

31 January 1982: January ends with Southampton top of the First Division. Manchester United are a point behind, while Ipswich Town are two points off the top but still have three games in hand. Manchester City occupy fourth place, two points behind the leaders. Liverpool's resurgence has seen them climb into fifth place. Brighton & Hove Albion, in only their third season as a top flight club, are in seventh position. Defending champions Aston Villa, meanwhile, are struggling in 17th place. Middlesbrough, Sunderland and Wolverhampton Wanderers occupy the relegation places. Luton Town, Oldham Athletic and Watford head the Second Division promotion race, followed closely behind by Blackburn Rovers, Chelsea and Queens Park Rangers.

2 February 1982: Wolverhampton Wanderers appoint Oxford United's Ian Greaves as their new manager.

9 February 1982: Ron Saunders announces his resignation as manager of defending league champions Aston Villa. He is succeeded by assistant Tony Barton.

13 February 1982: Chelsea shock Liverpool 2–0 at Stamford Bridge in the FA Cup fifth round. Shrewsbury Town surprisingly beat Ipswich Town 2–1, Watford's run ends with a 2–0 defeat to Leicester City, and Tottenham Hotspur beat troubled Aston Villa 1–0.

15 February 1982: Birmingham City sack manager Jim Smith, following a run of just one win since the beginning of October, which has left the club only a single place outside the relegation zone.

18 February 1982: Nine days after walking out on Aston Villa, Ron Saunders makes a surprise return to management with their local rivals Birmingham City.

28 February 1982: February ends with Southampton still top of the First Division, with Swansea City's challenge back on track as they occupy second place. Manchester United are six points off the top with two games in hand, and Liverpool now stand fourth, eight points off top place with three games in hand. Middlesbrough, Sunderland and Wolverhampton Wanderers remain in the bottom three. Luton Town, Watford and Oldham Athletic continue to head the Second Division promotion race, with their nearest challenge now coming from Rotherham United, who have yet to play top division football.

1 March 1982: Jim Smith makes a swift return to management at Oxford United, who had been managerless since the departure of Ian Greaves the previous month.

6 March 1982: Shrewsbury Town's impressive FA Cup run comes to an end when they lose 5–2 to Second Division rivals Leicester City at Filbert Street in the sixth round. In two London derbies, Tottenham Hotspur beat Chelsea 3–2 and Queens Park Rangers win 1–0 at home to Crystal Palace. West Bromwich Albion take the remaining semi-final place with a 2–0 win over Coventry City.

13 March 1982: Liverpool retain the Football League Cup with a 3–1 win over Tottenham Hotspur in the Wembley final.

16 March 1982: York City, who have been bottom of the Fourth Division for much of the last few months, sack Kevin Randall. Former captain Barry Swallow is appointed as the third manager of the season at the club, who are considered highly likely to be voted out of the Football League if they finish bottom for a consecutive season.

31 March 1982: Southampton remain the leaders of the First Division, but Liverpool and Ipswich Town are closing in, a point behind with three games in hand. Swansea City and Manchester United complete the top five. The bottom three of Middlesbrough, Sunderland and Wolverhampton Wanderers remains unchanged. Watford have overhauled Luton Town as Second Division leaders, with Sheffield Wednesday now completing the top three. Rotherham United, Blackburn Rovers and Newcastle United are close behind in the promotion race. Fulham defender Dave Clement, who was capped five times by England and spent the first 14 years of his career at Queens Park Rangers, commits suicide.

3 April 1982: FA Cup holders Tottenham Hotspur reach the final for the second reason running with a 2–0 semi-final win over surprise contestants Leicester City at Villa Park, while Second Division Queens Park Rangers overcome West Bromwich Albion 1–0 at Highbury to reach the final for the first time in their history. Tottenham's victory is marred by Leicester fans booing Argentine midfielder Ossie Ardiles amid hostility over the Falklands War.

7 April 1982: Liverpool achieve a vital 1–0 win over Manchester United at Old Trafford to move two points ahead of Ipswich Town at the top of the First Division.

21 April 1982: Tottenham Hotspur lose the European Cup Winners' Cup semi-final 2–1 on aggregate to Barcelona.

30 April 1982: Liverpool are now clear at the top of the First Division, four points ahead of Ipswich Town with a game in hand. Swansea City are third. Manchester City, who led the league four months ago, are now 10th. Middlesbrough and Wolverhampton Wanderers remain in the relegation zone, but Sunderland have climbed out of the bottom three at the expense of West Bromwich Albion. Luton Town's promotion is now almost certain, while Watford are also looking likely to reach the First Division for the first time in their history. Sheffield Wednesday currently occupy the final promotion place, but Leicester City, Norwich City and Queens Park Rangers remain in contention.

4 May 1982: Southampton and Coventry City draw 5–5 in the highest-scoring match of the First Division season. A brace from Ross Jenkins in Watford's Second Division win over Wrexham seals their promotion into the First Division for the first time in their history; Jenkins himself was playing for the Hertfordshire club in Division Four five years previously.

15 May 1982: Liverpool win the Football League championship for the 13th time after they beat Tottenham Hotspur 3–1 and Ipswich Town lose 3–1 at home to Nottingham Forest. Wolverhampton Wanderers are relegated despite beating West Ham United 2–1 in their last match of the season. The other two relegation places are still to be decided, with Middlesbrough, Stoke City, West Bromwich Albion and Leeds United all still in danger.

18 May 1982: Middlesbrough draw 0–0 with Liverpool and are relegated to the Second Division, finishing bottom of the First Division table. West Bromwich Albion guarantee safety by beating Leeds United 2–0.

20 May 1982: Stoke City beat West Bromwich Albion 3–0 to survive at the expense of Leeds United, who are relegated after 18 successive seasons in the First Division.

22 May 1982: The FA Cup final between Tottenham Hotspur and Queens Park Rangers ends in a 1–1 draw after extra time. Tottenham's line-up does not include Argentinians Ricardo Villa and Ossie Ardiles, who have withdrawn from first-team action owing to the Falklands War.

26 May 1982: Aston Villa lift the European Cup when a Peter Withe goal gives them victory over Bayern Munich in Rotterdam.

27 May 1982: Tottenham Hotspur retain the FA Cup thanks to a penalty from Glenn Hoddle in the replay against Queens Park Rangers.

29 May 1982: England beat Scotland 1–0 in the 100th international between the countries to win the Home Championship with a 100% record.

16 June 1982: England open their World Cup campaign with a 3–1 win over France.

20 June 1982: England seal qualification to the next stage of the World Cup by defeating Czechoslovakia 2–0.

25 June 1982: England complete the first stage of the World Cup with a 1–0 win over Kuwait.

29 June 1982: England draw 0–0 with West Germany in the first game of the second round of the World Cup.

5 July 1982: England are eliminated from the World Cup after only managing a goalless draw with host nation Spain in a match they needed to win. Ron Greenwood retires as national team manager, and is succeeded by Ipswich's Bobby Robson.

== National team ==
Ron Greenwood served as the manager of the England national team from 1977 to 1982. Greenwood led England to qualification for the 1980 UEFA European Championship and the 1982 FIFA World Cup — their first World Cup appearance since 1970. Following England’s elimination from the second group stage of the 1982 tournament, Greenwood, aged 61, retired from the role. He was succeeded by Bobby Robson, then manager of Ipswich Town, ahead of the 1981–82 English football season.

== UEFA competitions ==
Aston Villa beat Bayern Munich 1–0 in the 1982 European Cup Final. Arsenal were knocked out in the 3rd round of the UEFA Cup by semi-professional Belgian side KFC Winterslag

== FA Cup ==
Tottenham Hotspur retained the trophy, drawing 1–1 with Queens Park Rangers, managed by former Tottenham player Terry Venables, in the final before winning the replay 1–0. Venables would however eventually win the trophy himself with Tottenham in 1991.

== League Cup ==
Liverpool won the League Cup with a 3–1 victory over Tottenham Hotspur in the final.

== Football League ==
=== First Division ===
The First Division title race brought many different challengers. But in the end, however, Liverpool overcame a dismal first half of the season which saw them climb from mid-table at Christmas to clinching the title on the final day of the season, having lifted the Football League Cup weeks earlier for the second successive season. Ipswich (runners-up), Manchester United (third), Swansea (sixth) and Southampton (seventh) all managed good finishes in the league despite being unable to win the title, but Manchester City finished a disappointing 10th after briefly taking the lead of the First Division just after Christmas. Liverpool's season of triumph was overshadowed, however, by the death of former manager Bill Shankly in late September following a heart attack.

Tottenham retained the FA Cup to match Aston Villa's record of seven wins in the competition.

By contrast, Villa had a disappointing defence of the league title and could only finish 11th, with manager Ron Saunders stepping down in February and being replaced by his assistant Tony Barton, who enjoyed instant success in his first managerial job by guiding Villa to glory in the European Cup, while Saunders made a quick return to management at local rivals Birmingham City, achieving First Division survival by a comfortable margin.

Middlesbrough finished bottom of the First Division and went down after eight years among the elite. Wolves, faced with huge debts and the possibility of bankruptcy, went down too. Leeds United, who had rarely challenged for honours since Don Revie left for the England job in 1974, ended their 18-year stay in the First Division with relegation.

Pos	Team	Pld	W	D	L	GF	GA	GD	Pts	Qualification or relegation
1	Liverpool (C)	42	26	9	7	80	32	+48	87	Qualification for the European Cup first round
2	Ipswich Town	42	26	5	11	75	53	+22	83	Qualification for the UEFA Cup first round
3	Manchester United	42	22	12	8	59	29	+30	78	Qualification for the UEFA Cup first round
4	Tottenham Hotspur	42	20	11	11	67	48	+19	71	Qualification for the Cup Winners' Cup first round (Note: Tottenham Hotspur qualified for the European Cup Winners' Cup first round as the 1981–82 FA Cup winners.)
5	Arsenal	42	20	11	11	48	37	+11	71	Qualification for the UEFA Cup first round
6	Swansea City	42	21	6	15	58	51	+7	69	Qualification for the Cup Winners' Cup preliminary round (Note: Swansea City qualified for the European Cup Winners' Cup preliminary round as the 1982 Welsh Cup winners.)
7	Southampton	42	19	9	14	72	67	+5	66	Qualification for the UEFA Cup first round
8	Everton	42	17	13	12	56	50	+6	64	
9	West Ham United	42	14	16	12	66	57	+9	58	
10	Manchester City	42	15	13	14	49	50	−1	58	
11	Aston Villa	42	15	12	15	55	53	+2	57	Qualification for the European Cup first round (Note: Aston Villa qualified for the European Cup first round as the 1981–82 European Cup winners.)
12	Nottingham Forest	42	15	12	15	42	48	−6	57	
13	Brighton & Hove Albion	42	13	13	16	43	52	−9	52	
14	Coventry City	42	13	11	18	56	62	−6	50	
15	Notts County	42	13	8	21	61	69	−8	47	
16	Birmingham City	42	10	14	18	53	61	−8	44	
17	West Bromwich Albion	42	11	11	20	46	57	−11	44	
18	Stoke City	42	12	8	22	44	63	−19	44	
19	Sunderland	42	11	11	20	38	58	−20	44	
20	Leeds United (R)	42	10	12	20	39	61	−22	42	Relegation to the Second Division
21	Wolverhampton Wanderers (R)	42	10	10	22	32	63	−31	40	Relegation to the Second Division
22	Middlesbrough (R)	42	8	15	19	34	52	−18	39	Relegation to the Second Division

Source: World Football
Rules for classification: 1) Points; 2) Goal difference; 3) Goals scored
(C) Champions; (R) Relegated

=== Second Division ===
Luton Town clinched the Second Division title and a place in the top flight in their fourth season under the management of David Pleat, while their local rivals Watford reached the First Division for the first time in their history by finishing runners-up. The final promotion place went to Norwich City, who went from mid table to third place in the final quarter of the season with a storming run of form. Sheffield Wednesday missed out on promotion by a single point, while FA Cup finalists QPR were just two points short of promotion. Barnsley's success under Norman Hunter continued when they finished sixth, the closest they had come in decades to winning the First Division place that had eluded them since their formation in 1896. Emlyn Hughes, the former England captain, enjoyed a promising start to his managerial career as his Rotherham United side emerged as unlikely contenders for a First Division place, before they finished seventh.

Orient, Wrexham and Cardiff City were relegated to the Third Division.

Pos	Team	Pld	W	D	L	GF	GA	GD	Pts	Qualification or relegation
1	Luton Town (C, P)	42	25	13	4	86	46	+40	88	Promotion to the First Division
2	Watford (P)	42	23	11	8	76	42	+34	80	Promotion to the First Division
3	Norwich City (P)	42	22	5	15	64	50	+14	71	Promotion to the First Division
4	Sheffield Wednesday	42	20	10	12	55	51	+4	70	
5	Queens Park Rangers	42	21	6	15	65	43	+22	69	
6	Barnsley	42	19	10	13	59	41	+18	67	
7	Rotherham United	42	20	7	15	66	54	+12	67	
8	Leicester City	42	18	12	12	56	48	+8	66	
9	Newcastle United	42	18	8	16	52	50	+2	62	
10	Blackburn Rovers	42	16	11	15	47	43	+4	59	
11	Oldham Athletic	42	15	14	13	50	51	−1	59	
12	Chelsea	42	15	12	15	60	60	0	57	
13	Charlton Athletic	42	13	12	17	50	65	−15	51	
14	Cambridge United	42	13	9	20	48	53	−5	48	
15	Crystal Palace	42	13	9	20	34	45	−11	48	
16	Derby County	42	12	12	18	53	68	−15	48	
17	Grimsby Town	42	11	13	18	53	65	−12	46	
18	Shrewsbury Town	42	11	13	18	37	57	−20	46	
19	Bolton Wanderers	42	13	7	22	39	61	−22	46	
20	Cardiff City (R)	42	12	8	22	45	61	−16	44	Relegation to the Third Division
21	Wrexham (R)	42	11	11	20	40	56	−16	44	Relegation to the Third Division
22	Orient (R)	42	10	9	23	36	61	−25	39	Relegation to the Third Division

Rules for classification: 1) Points; 2) Goal difference; 3) Goals scored
(C) Champions; (P) Promoted; (R) Relegated

=== Third Division ===
Burnley clinched the Third Division title on goal difference ahead of Carlisle United in a tight promotion race, with the final promotion place going to Fulham. Lincoln City missed out on a Second Division place by a single point, while Oxford United's turnaround under new owner Robert Maxwell and new manager Jim Smith was not quite enough for promotion as they had to settle for fifth place in the final table.

Bristol City, faced with closure as a result of huge debts, became the first English league club to suffer three successive relegations. Chester's seven-year stay in the Third Division came to an end as they finished bottom of the table and 21 points adrift of safety. Also relegated were Swindon Town and Wimbledon.

Pos	Team	Pld	W	D	L	GF	GA	GD	Pts	Promotion or relegation
1	Burnley (C, P)	46	21	17	8	66	45	+21	80	Promotion to the Second Division
2	Carlisle United (P)	46	23	11	12	65	50	+15	80	Promotion to the Second Division
3	Fulham (P)	46	21	15	10	77	51	+26	78	Promotion to the Second Division
4	Lincoln City	46	21	14	11	66	40	+26	77	
5	Oxford United	46	19	14	13	63	49	+14	71	
6	Gillingham	46	20	11	15	64	56	+8	71	
7	Southend United	46	18	15	13	63	51	+12	69	
8	Brentford	46	19	11	16	56	47	+9	68	
9	Millwall	46	18	13	15	62	62	0	67	
10	Plymouth Argyle	46	18	11	17	64	56	+8	65	
11	Chesterfield	46	18	10	18	57	58	−1	64	
12	Reading	46	17	11	18	67	75	−8	62	
13	Portsmouth	46	14	19	13	56	51	+5	61	
14	Preston North End	46	16	13	17	50	56	−6	61	
15	Bristol Rovers	46	18	9	19	58	65	−7	61 (Note: Bristol Rovers had 2 points deducted.)	
16	Newport County	46	14	16	16	54	54	0	58	
17	Huddersfield Town	46	15	12	19	64	59	+5	57	
18	Exeter City	46	16	9	21	71	84	−13	57	
19	Doncaster Rovers	46	13	17	16	55	68	−13	56	
20	Walsall	46	13	14	19	51	55	−4	53	
21	Wimbledon (R)	46	14	11	21	61	75	−14	53	Relegation to the Fourth Division
22	Swindon Town (R)	46	13	13	20	55	71	−16	52	Relegation to the Fourth Division
23	Bristol City (R)	46	11	13	22	40	65	−25	46	Relegation to the Fourth Division
24	Chester (R)	46	7	11	28	36	78	−42	32	Relegation to the Fourth Division

Source: rsssf.com (incorrect), source=11v11.com
(C) Champions; (P) Promoted; (R) Relegated

=== Fourth Division ===
Sheffield United's ambitious revival under new manager Ian Porterfield began with the Fourth Division title. They went up with Bradford City, Wigan Athletic and AFC Bournemouth.

There was no movement between the Football League and the Alliance Premier League this season.

Pos	Team	Pld	W	D	L	GF	GA	GD	Pts	Promotion
1	Sheffield United (C, P)	46	27	15	4	94	41	+53	96	Promotion to the Third Division
2	Bradford City (P)	46	26	13	7	88	45	+43	91	Promotion to the Third Division
3	Wigan Athletic (P)	46	26	13	7	80	46	+34	91	Promotion to the Third Division
4	Bournemouth (P)	46	23	19	4	62	30	+32	88	Promotion to the Third Division
5	Peterborough United	46	24	10	12	71	57	+14	82	
6	Colchester United	46	20	12	14	82	57	+25	72	
7	Port Vale	46	18	16	12	56	49	+7	70	
8	Hull City	46	19	12	15	70	61	+9	69	
9	Bury	46	17	17	12	80	59	+21	68	
10	Hereford United	46	16	19	11	64	58	+6	67	
11	Tranmere Rovers	46	14	18	14	51	56	−5	60	
12	Blackpool	46	15	13	18	66	60	+6	58	
13	Darlington	46	15	13	18	61	62	−1	58	
14	Hartlepool United	46	13	16	17	73	84	−11	55	
15	Torquay United	46	14	13	19	47	59	−12	55	
16	Aldershot	46	13	15	18	57	68	−11	54	
17	York City	46	14	8	24	69	91	−22	50	
18	Stockport County	46	12	13	21	48	67	−19	49	
19	Halifax Town	46	9	22	15	51	72	−21	49	
20	Mansfield Town	46	13	10	23	63	81	−18	47 (Note: Mansfield Town had 2 points deducted.)	
21	Rochdale	46	10	16	20	50	62	−12	46	Re-elected
22	Northampton Town	46	11	9	26	57	84	−27	42	Re-elected
23	Scunthorpe United	46	9	15	22	43	79	−36	42	Re-elected
24	Crewe Alexandra	46	6	9	31	29	84	−55	27	Re-elected

(C) Champions; (P) Promoted

=== Top goalscorers ===
First Division

- Kevin Keegan (Southampton) – 26 goals

Second Division

- Ronnie Moore (Rotherham United) – 22 goals

Third Division

- Gordon Davies (Fulham) – 24 goals

Fourth Division

- Keith Edwards (Hull City and Sheffield United) – 36 goals

== Non-league football ==
The divisional champions of the major non-League competitions were:

Competition	Winners
Alliance Premier League	Runcorn
Isthmian League	Leytonstone/Ilford
Northern Premier League	Bangor City
Southern League	Midland Division – Nuneaton Borough; Southern Division – Wealdstone
FA Trophy	Enfield
FA Vase	Forest Green Rovers

== Awards ==
- Southampton striker Kevin Keegan marked his return to English football by scoring more goals than any other player in the Football League and being voted PFA Players' Player of the Year.
- Tottenham's Steve Perryman added to his FA Cup winners medal with the FWA Footballer of the Year award.
- Southampton's Steve Moran was elected as PFA Young Player of the Year.

== Successful managers ==
- Bob Paisley retained the League Cup and won the league title for Liverpool.
- Tony Barton won the European Cup with Aston Villa.
- Keith Burkinshaw helped Tottenham win the FA Cup for the second year running.
- David Pleat ended Luton Town's absence from the top flight by guiding them to the Second Division title.
- Graham Taylor took Watford into the First Division for the first time in their history.
- David Webb took AFC Bournemouth into the Third Division after they finished fourth in the Fourth Division.

== Famous debutants ==
5 September 1981: John Barnes, 17-year-old Jamaica born winger, makes his debut for Watford in their 1–1 home draw with Oldham Athletic in the Second Division.

10 October 1981: Gary Stevens, 18-year-old full back, makes his debut for Everton in their 1–1 league draw with West Ham United at Upton Park.

21 November 1981: Kevin Richardson, 18-year-old midfielder, makes his debut for Everton in their 2–1 league defeat at home to Sunderland.

5 December 1981: Stewart Robson, 17-year-old midfielder, makes his debut for Arsenal in their 2–1 league win over West Ham United at Upton Park.

24 April 1982: Norman Whiteside, 16-year-old Northern Irish forward, makes his debut for Manchester United in their 1–0 win over Brighton & Hove Albion at the Goldstone Ground 13 days before his 17th birthday.

28 April 1982: Mark Walters, 17-year-old midfielder, makes his debut for Aston Villa in their 4–1 home defeat by Leeds United in the league.

1 May 1982: Peter Davenport, 21-year-old striker, makes his debut for Nottingham Forest in a 2–0 league defeat by Liverpool at Anfield.

15 May 1982: Steve Hodge, 19-year-old midfielder, makes his debut for Nottingham Forest in a 3–1 league win over Ipswich Town at Portman Road.

== Deaths ==
- 29 September 1981 – Bill Shankly, 68, former Liverpool manager who transformed the Reds into one of Europe's top footballing sides. Shankly had taken Liverpool into the First Division in 1962, and over the next 12 years they were league champions three times, FA Cup winners twice and UEFA Cup winners once.
- 8 December 1981 – Bob Lord, 73, chairman of Burnley F.C. for 26 years until three months before his death, died of cancer.
- 31 March 1982 – Dave Clement, 34, former QPR and England full-back who committed suicide after breaking his leg.
- 13 May 1982 – Billy Steel, 59, became the most expensive player in Britain in 1947 when he left Morton in his native Scotland to move south of the border to Derby County.
