= Chris Hughton =

Irish football manager (born 1958)

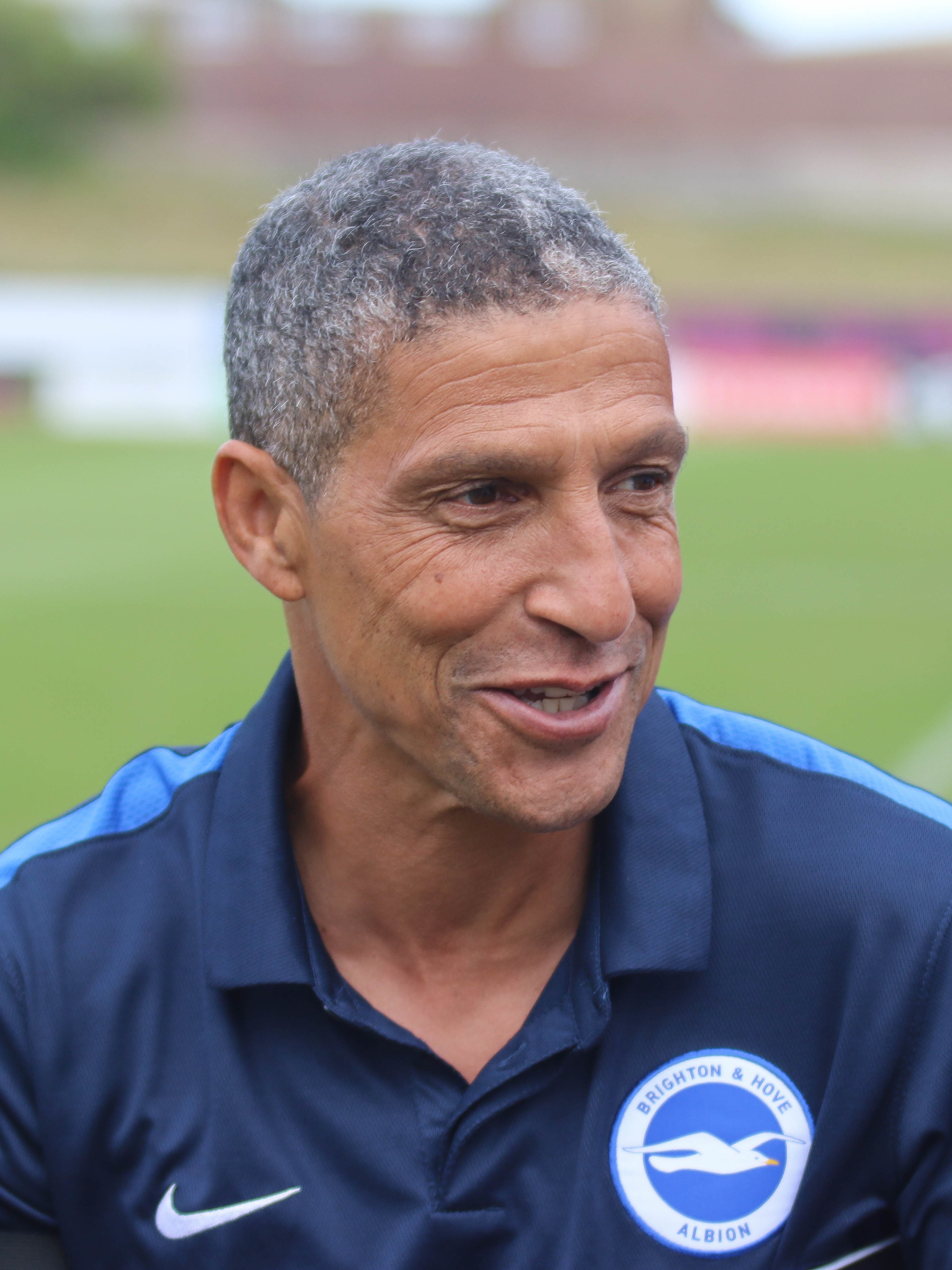
- Hughton in 2015

Personal information
- Full name: Christopher William Gerard Hughton
- Date of birth: 11 December 1958 (age 67)
- Place of birth: Forest Gate, Essex, England
- Height: 5 ft 7 in (1.70 m)
- Position: Full-back

Senior career*
Years	Team	Apps	(Gls)
1977–1990	Tottenham Hotspur	297	(12)
1990–1992	West Ham United	32	(0)
1992–1993	Brentford	32	(0)
Total		361	(12)

International career
1979–1991	Republic of Ireland	53	(1)

Managerial career
- 1997: Tottenham Hotspur (caretaker)
- 1998: Tottenham Hotspur (caretaker)
- 2008: Newcastle United (caretaker)
- 2009–2010: Newcastle United
- 2011–2012: Birmingham City
- 2012–2014: Norwich City
- 2014–2019: Brighton & Hove Albion
- 2020–2021: Nottingham Forest
- 2023–2024: Ghana
- * Club domestic league appearances and goals

Christopher William Gerard Hughton (born 11 December 1958) is a professional football manager and former player. Born in England, he represented the Republic of Ireland national team. He was most recently head coach of the Ghana national team.

After making his professional debut aged 20, Hughton spent most of his playing career with Tottenham Hotspur as a left-back, leaving in 1990 after 13 years. After relatively brief spells with West Ham United and Brentford, he retired from playing in 1993 at the age of 34. He earned 53 caps representing the Republic of Ireland, scoring one goal and starting in all three of Ireland's games at UEFA Euro 1988 in West Germany.

From 1993 to 2007, Hughton served as coach and then assistant manager for Tottenham. He joined Newcastle United as first team coach in 2008, and, following their relegation, became caretaker manager. He led Newcastle back to the Premier League in his first season in charge, along the way breaking a number of records and securing the permanent managerial position. He was dismissed as manager by Mike Ashley the following December, with his side 12th in the table. Hughton managed Birmingham City for a single season, leading them to fourth place in the league, before joining Norwich City in June 2012. Norwich dismissed him in April 2014 following a run of poor results.

Following his departure from Norwich, Hughton became manager of Brighton & Hove Albion in December 2014. Three years later in 2017, he led the club to promotion to the Premier League for the first time in its history. He avoided relegation for two successive seasons before being dismissed in May 2019 due to a run of poor form. Hughton was appointed as manager of Nottingham Forest in October 2020, before being dismissed in September 2021 after a poor start to the season. He acted as technical advisor to the Ghana national team for the period of their World Cup qualifiers in March 2022.

In February 2023, he was promoted to the position of head coach of Ghana following the resignation of Otto Addo after the failure of the Black Stars team at the 2022 FIFA World Cup in Qatar. However, following Ghana's group-stage exit at the 2023 Africa Cup of Nations, Hughton was relieved of his duties as head coach.

== Club career ==
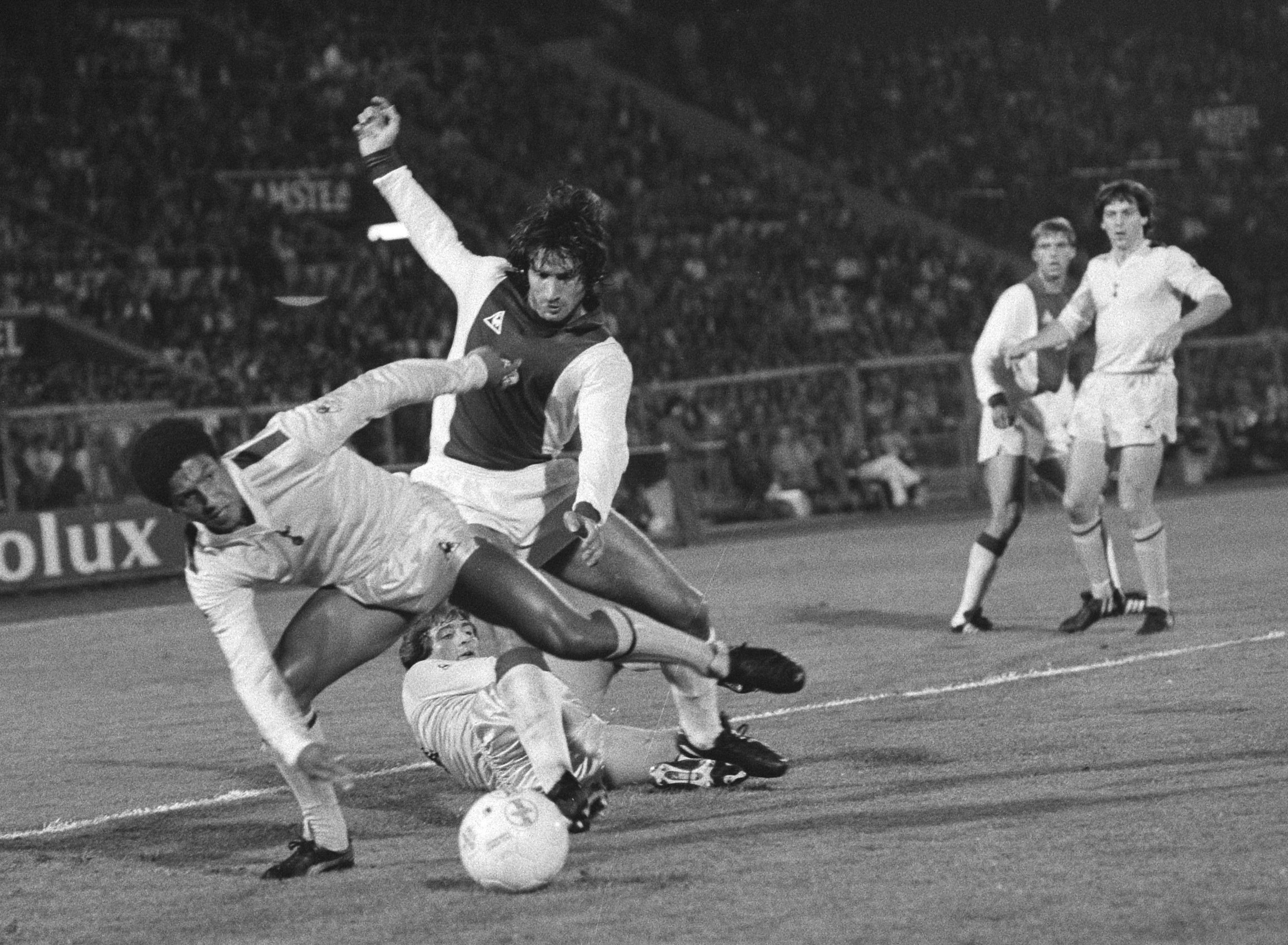
Chris Hughton in 1981, Ajax vs Spurs

Hughton first joined Tottenham Hotspur's youth system in 1971 at the age of 13. He signed as a part-time footballer in 1977, and trained as a lift engineer. He signed to become a full-time professional footballer in July 1979, and made his first team debut that year in the second round of the 1979–80 League Cup against Manchester United. In his early days at the club, he played as a winger. He then became a full back who played on either side – even though he is naturally right-footed – before settling into the left-back position. He is considered one of the best full-backs to have played for the club.

Hughton played 398 games for Tottenham in all competitions, scoring 19 goals. He was a member of the Tottenham side that won both the 1981 and the 1982 FA Cups, the 1984 UEFA Cup, and finished runners-up in the 1982 League Cup.

By 1986, injuries and competition from other full-backs meant that Hughton could no longer secure a regular place in the starting lineup. He did however play in the 1987 FA Cup final after Danny Thomas was injured, the team finishing as runners-up in the competition.

In November 1990, West Ham United signed Hughton, initially on loan as cover for the injured Julian Dicks, then signed on a permanent basis by manager Billy Bonds on a free transfer. He played two seasons at West Ham, making 43 appearances in all competitions without scoring, and helped them win promotion from Division Two in 1991.

In 1992, he signed for Brentford, again on a free transfer. He helped Brentford win the Third Division title in the 1991–92 season. He played for a year for Brentford, before retiring at the age of 34 due to a knee injury in early 1993.

== International career ==
Hughton qualified to play for the Republic of Ireland as the son of an Irish mother and a Ghanaian father, becoming the first mixed-race player to represent the country. He made his debut for Ireland in October 1979 in a friendly against the United States. He won 53 caps for the Republic from 1979 to 1991.

Hughton was part of the nation's final squads for UEFA Euro 1988 – playing in all three matches – and the 1990 FIFA World Cup, where he did not play (Steve Staunton played instead). He scored his only international goal in a 6–0 win against Cyprus in the qualifiers for the 1982 World Cup.

Hughton was awarded a testimonial, staged on 29 May 1995 at Lansdowne Road.

He served as the national team's assistant manager under Brian Kerr, from February 2003 to October 2005.

=== International goals ===
Scores and results list Republic of Ireland's goal tally first.

#	Date	Venue	Opponent	Score	Result	Competition	Ref
1.	19 November 1980	Lansdowne Road, Dublin	Cyprus	6–0	6–0	1982 World Cup qualifier	

== Coaching and managerial career ==
=== Tottenham Hotspur ===
From June 1993 to October 2007, Hughton was a coach at Tottenham Hotspur, initially in charge of the under-21 team, then the reserve side in 1999, being promoted to the first team two years later. In his time at Spurs, he served under 11 different managers: Keith Burkinshaw, Ray Clemence, Doug Livermore, Osvaldo Ardiles, Gerry Francis, Christian Gross, George Graham, Glenn Hoddle, David Pleat, Jacques Santini and Martin Jol. He also served as caretaker manager on two occasions. With Hughton on board, Tottenham finished fifth for two consecutive seasons (2005–06 and 2006–07), while also winning the Football League Cup in 1998–99. On 25 October 2007, Hughton was dismissed as assistant manager along with then manager Jol, following a UEFA Cup home defeat, in the group stages, to Getafe.

=== Newcastle United ===
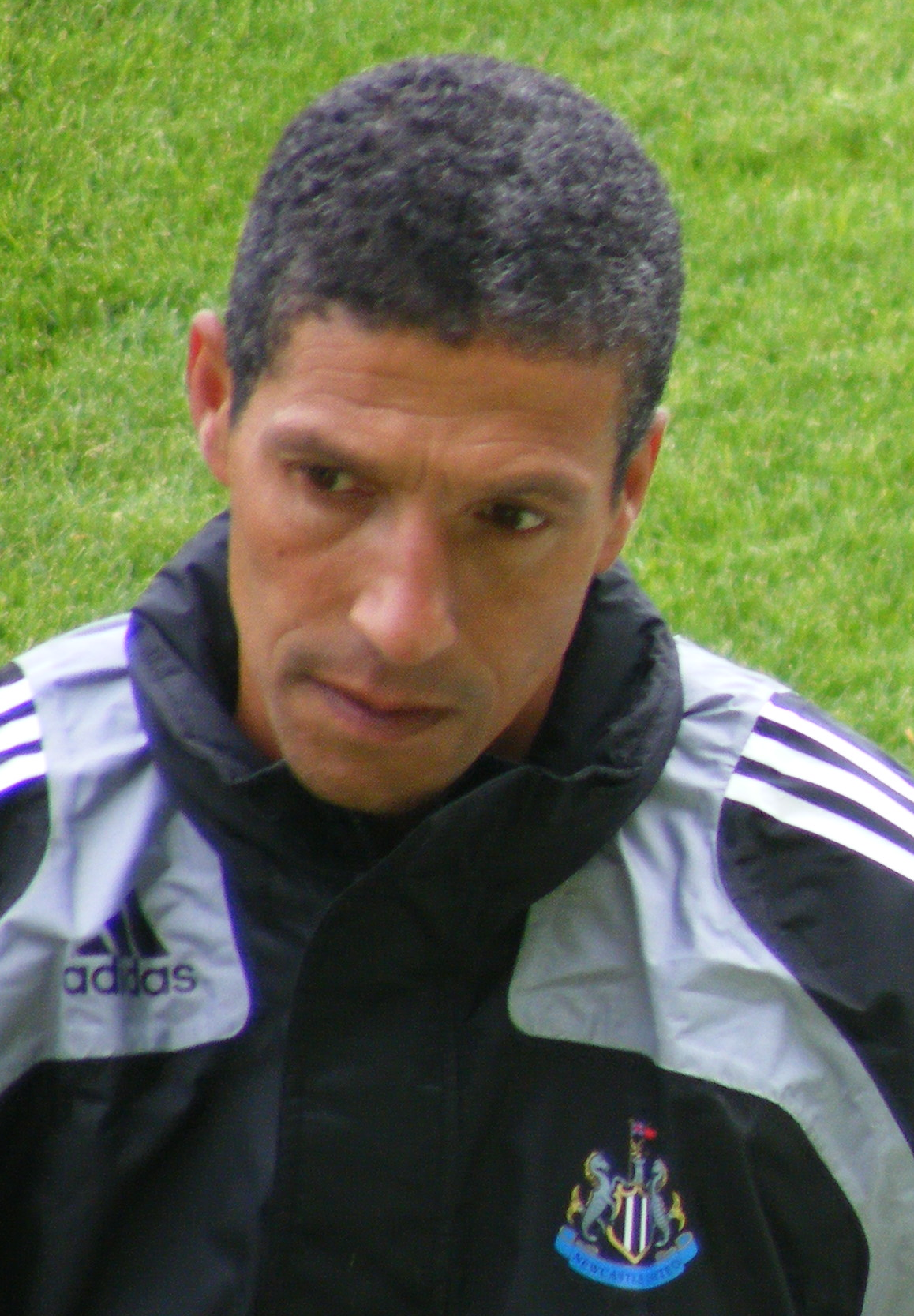
Hughton with Newcastle United in 2008

On 22 February 2008, Hughton was appointed first team coach at Newcastle United by director of football Dennis Wise, joining Kevin Keegan's coaching staff, working primarily on defence with Steve Round. In his first match, Newcastle beat Hughton's former club Tottenham 4–1, at White Hart Lane.

On 8 September 2008, Hughton was named caretaker manager of Newcastle following the departures of Keegan, Terry McDermott and Adam Sadler. After a defeat to newly promoted, but in-form, Hull City and a League Cup exit to Tottenham Hotspur though, Hughton stood down as caretaker and was replaced on a temporary basis by Joe Kinnear. Hughton was promoted to assistant manager after the Magpies appointed Colin Calderwood as first team coach on 26 January 2009. In February, Kinnear took ill before a game with West Bromwich Albion and Hughton took charge of that game which Newcastle won 3–2. In the week following the win, it was revealed that Kinnear needed a heart bypass operation and that Hughton along with Colin Calderwood and Paul Barron would have to take charge of the team for the next few weeks and possibly months. However, defeats to Bolton Wanderers, Manchester United and Arsenal, and draws against Everton and Hull City resulted in Newcastle appointing Alan Shearer as interim manager until the end of the season.

==== Caretaker spell ====
During the off-season of 2009, owner Mike Ashley announced he was selling the club, and Hughton was again left with the job of caretaker manager when the club failed to further secure the services of Alan Shearer. This was followed by a statement from Llambias: "Mike Ashley feels it would be unwise to appoint a team manager when the club is for sale," leaving Hughton in charge for the start of the 2009–10 season. Hughton's first two games in charge of the new season saw inspired performances in a 1–1 draw with West Bromwich Albion away from home and a memorable 3–0 win against Reading at home, which ended in Shola Ameobi getting his first ever hat trick. He continued Newcastle's unbeaten start of the new season with a 1–0 victory over Sheffield Wednesday which also featured his first transfer signing of the season Danny Simpson. Hughton also signed Peter Løvenkrands and Fabrice Pancrate on free transfers and completed the loan signings of Zurab Khizanishvili and Marlon Harewood.

==== Permanent role ====
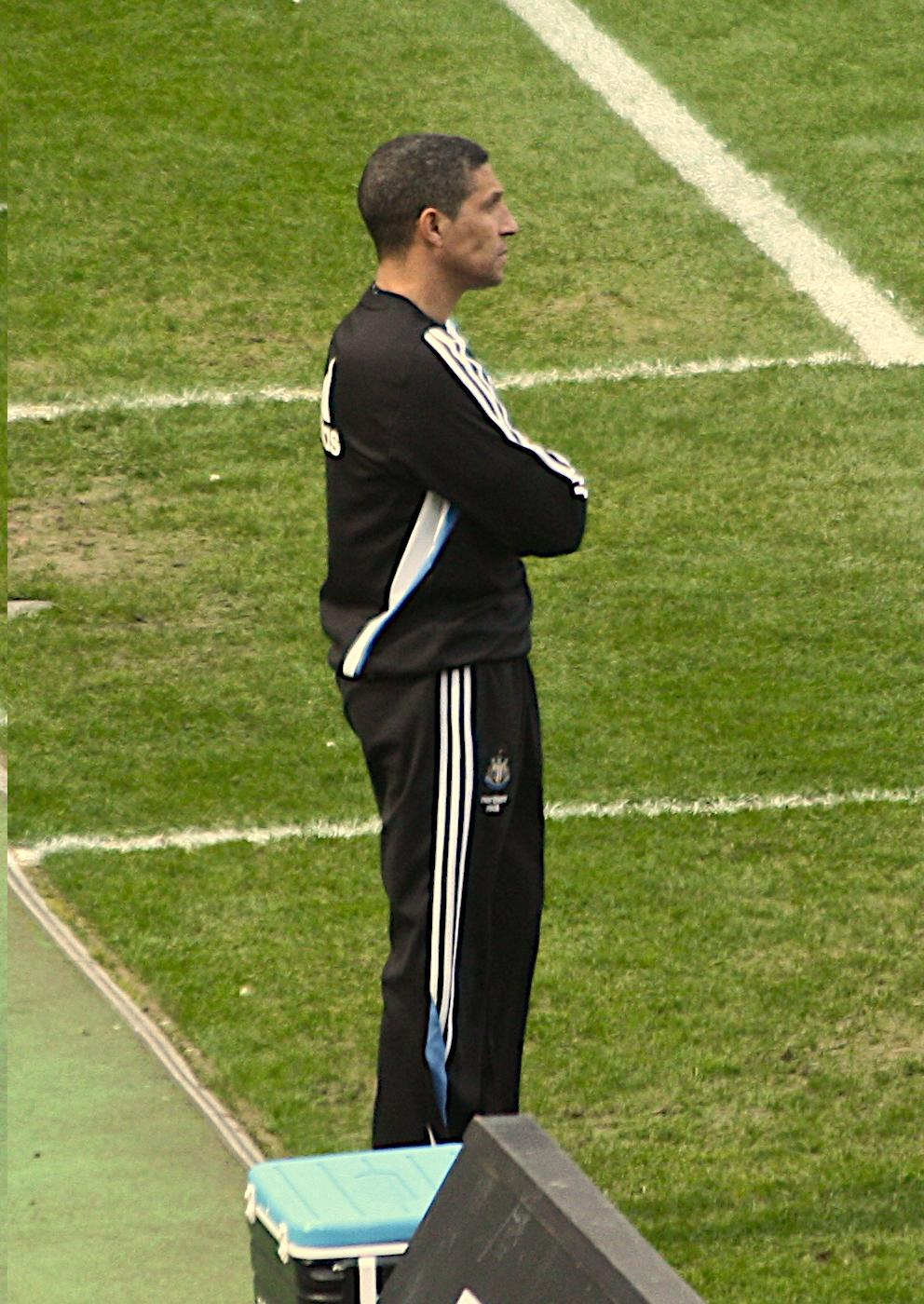
Hughton managing Newcastle United in 2010

A positive start to the 2009–10 season saw Hughton win successive Manager of the Month awards for August and September and then again in November, resulting in the board naming him as the new permanent manager of the club, after two stints as caretaker. Hughton's league start to his managerial career was the best in Newcastle's history. In January, Newcastle signed Mike Williamson, Wayne Routledge and Leon Best in permanent transfers and Fitz Hall and Patrick van Aanholt on loan. On 5 April 2010, Newcastle, under Hughton's control, confirmed their promotion back to the Premier League prior to a match against Sheffield United, after Nottingham Forest failed to win their match against Cardiff City. They then went on to win the game 2–1 with a Peter Løvenkrands penalty and a bicycle kick-goal from Kevin Nolan to earn them a place back in the Premier League after just one season away. Newcastle then went on to clinch the Championship title on 19 April 2010 after a 2–0 victory over Plymouth Argyle, winning 30, drawing 12 and losing just 4 of their 46 matches. Newcastle were unbeaten at home for the entire 2009–10 season including both cup competitions, clinching promotion in record time.

During pre-season for the 2010–11 season, Hughton signed Sol Campbell and Dan Gosling for free whilst getting James Perch for an undisclosed fee. His first home win on return to the Premier League came on 22 August, when Newcastle thrashed Aston Villa 6–0, with three goals from Andy Carroll, two goals from Kevin Nolan and one from Joey Barton. Hughton received praise for his calm management style to stabilise the club, shrewd signings and guiding Newcastle back to the Premier League. Prior to Newcastle's 1–1 draw with Wolverhampton Wanderers and away win at Everton, he completed the signings of Cheick Tioté and Hatem Ben Arfa. Despite leading his newly promoted side to healthy ninth place by the end of October, unrest came when star player Andy Carroll was arrested for assault. Newcastle followed this with wins at West Ham United and a memorable 5–1 derby victory against Sunderland. Both before and after the victory Hughton received the backing of his players and the Newcastle supporters. Later in 2010, Hughton led United to their first win against Arsenal in five years, beating Arsenal 1–0 at the Emirates Stadium with an Andy Carroll header.

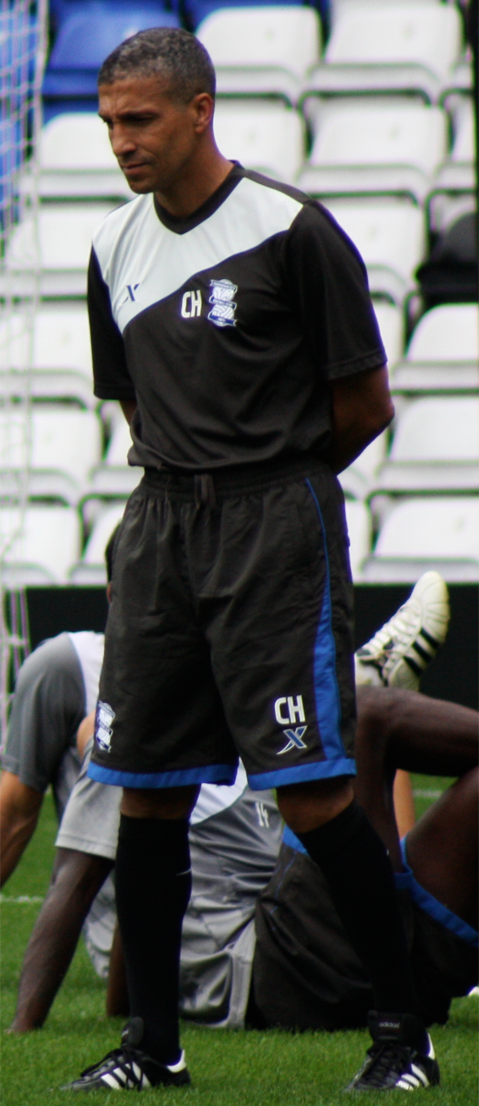
Hughton managing Birmingham City in 2011

Following a 3–1 defeat at West Brom in December, Hughton became the first Premier League manager of the 2010–11 season to lose his job, as he was dismissed by managing director Derek Llambias. The decision was badly received by the players and the supporters, with veteran defender Sol Campbell claiming that the decision "makes no sense", and local commentator and ex-player John Anderson saying he was "devastated and angry". The dismissal was also condemned by Lord Alan Sugar, Colin Calderwood and Alan Shearer. The club stated that "an individual with more managerial experience [was] needed to take the club forward". Peter Fraser of Sky Sports said that Hughton "brought calmness, dignity and respect to the Magpies' dugout", while the BBC's Phil McNulty's opinion was that "Newcastle's followers have been loyal and grateful to Hughton" and that "Ashley will no doubt face further accusations that he is out of touch with football's realities". Before the match against Liverpool on 11 December, campaigners from United For Newcastle organised a protest outside St James' Park as an opportunity for supporters to thank Hughton and to show their anger towards Ashley's decision.

=== Birmingham City ===
After media speculation linking Hughton with a variety of clubs, Hughton was appointed manager of Championship club and League Cup holders Birmingham City in June 2011. In the club's first European campaign for 50 years, he led them into the group stages of the UEFA Europa League courtesy of a 3–0 aggregate win against Portuguese side Nacional. During October, Birmingham won four and drew one of their league matches, an achievement for which Hughton was named Championship Manager of the Month. He led Birmingham to the fifth round of the 2011–12 FA Cup, drawing away at Chelsea before losing 2–0 in the replay. Hughton guided the Blues to a fourth-placed finish in the Championship, qualifying for the play-offs, where they lost 3–2 over the two legs of the semi-final against Blackpool.

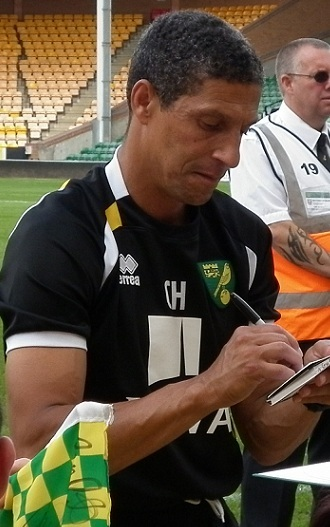
Hughton with for Norwich in 2012.

=== Norwich City ===
At the end of the 2011–12 season, Birmingham gave Norwich City permission to talk to Hughton about their vacant managerial post, and he signed for the Canaries on 7 June 2012. His first league game in charge was against Fulham, where Norwich lost 5–0, although this result was followed by memorable league victories against both Arsenal and Manchester United, as well as a League Cup victory against Tottenham Hotspur. Norwich, however, experienced bad form throughout the winter and towards the end of the season. Wins against West Brom and Manchester City, on the last day of the season, prevented relegation, meaning Wigan Athletic instead went down. Having battled against relegation for the whole of the season, Hughton's first season in charge saw them finish in 11th place.

Norwich experienced a turbulent period throughout the 2013–14 season with the club winning only 10 games, with eight of those victories coming in league and two in the Football League Cup as at March 2014. On 6 April 2014, Norwich announced they had "parted company" with Hughton with immediate effect. At the time of his departure, Norwich were in 17th place in the Premier League, one place and five points above the relegation zone. Since leaving Norwich, Hughton was offered, and rejected, assistant manager roles at various Premier League clubs.

=== Brighton & Hove Albion ===
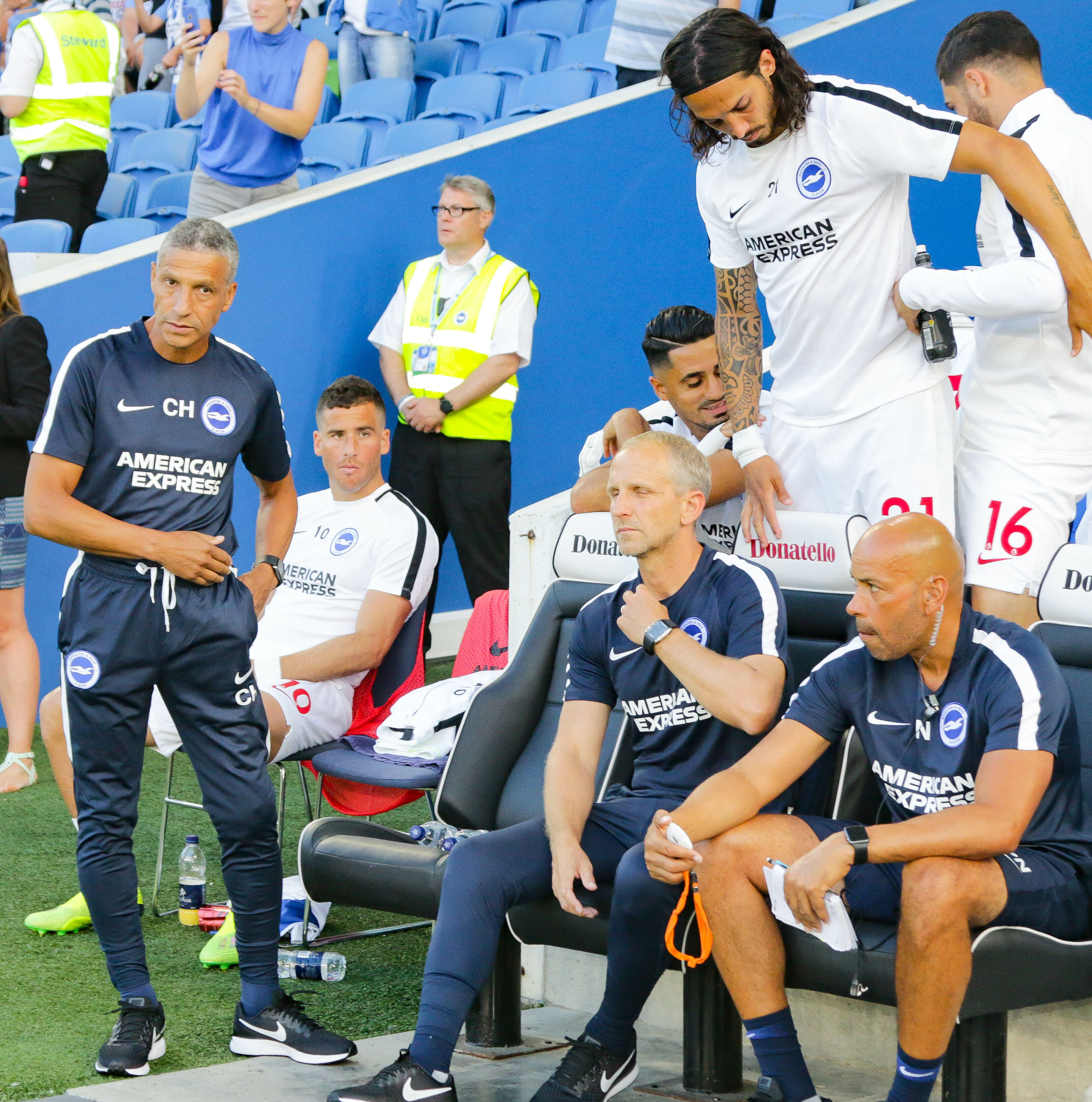
Hughton (left) with coaching staff and players prior to pre-season match against Nantes in August 2018

On 31 December 2014, Hughton was announced as the new man in charge of Championship side Brighton & Hove Albion on a three-and-a-half-year contract. His first match in-charge ended with a 2–0 win at Brentford in the third round of the FA Cup on 3 January 2015. In May 2016, Hughton signed a new four-year contract which would run until June 2020.

By April 2017 with three games left to go, Hughton had guided Brighton to the top of the 2016–17 EFL Championship earning the club automatic promotion to the Premier League after a 2–1 win at home to Wigan. They led Newcastle by seven points with nine to play for, but lost their next two games to Norwich City and Bristol City before drawing 1-1 at Aston Villa, allowing Newcastle to take the title as they won their remaining three matches.

On 9 March 2018, Hughton won Premier League Manager of the Month award for February and became the first black manager to win the prize. He guided Brighton to 15th place in their first season in the Premier League, securing their status in the division with a 1–0 home victory against Manchester United.

On 13 May 2019, despite leading the club to safety again with a 17th-place finish and leading them to the FA Cup semi-finals (where they lost to eventual winners Manchester City), Hughton was sacked by Brighton following a run of only three wins in 23 games in the Premier League, leaving the club only two points clear of relegation at the end of the 2018–19 season.

=== Nottingham Forest ===
On 6 October 2020, Hughton was appointed manager of EFL Championship club Nottingham Forest, following Sabri Lamouchi's dismissal earlier in the day. Hughton's first game as Forest manager was a 1–0 win away at Blackburn Rovers on 17 October 2020. After taking over a Forest side that were bottom of the Championship table with zero points, Hughton guided Forest to a 17th-place position in his first season in charge, finishing nine points above the relegation zone. During Hughton's first season in charge, Forest were a well organised team with a good defensive record, but often struggled to score goals.

Ahead of the new season, Hughton was faced with the task of rebuilding his Forest side into a team capable of challenging for promotion. Hughton was faced with seven players out of contract, five loan players returning to their parent clubs and four more players told that they were free to leave, meaning a substantial rebuild was required. Hughton felt that improving Nottingham Forest's attacking threat should be their main priority in the summer transfer window. On 16 September 2021, Hughton was dismissed after gaining just one point in Forest's opening seven matches of the season. This was Forest's worst start to a season since 1913.

=== Ghana national team ===
In February 2022, Hughton accepted a role as technical advisor to the Ghana national team's coaching staff for the period of their World Cup qualifiers in March. In May 2022, Hughton was appointed in the same role until the end of December 2022 alongside Otto Addo as head coach and George Boateng and Mas-Ud Didi Dramani as assistant coaches, the same set-up for the 2022 FIFA World Cup final play-off matches against Nigeria.

On 12 February 2023, Hughton was appointed as head coach of the Ghana national team. With Ghana having failed to qualify from the group stages of the 2023 Africa Cup of Nations, Hughton was sacked on 23 January 2024.

== Personal life ==
Hughton was born in Forest Gate, then part of Essex, now part of London, the son of a Ghanaian postman, Willie Hughton, and his Irish wife Christine, née Bourke. He was educated locally, at St Bonaventure's Catholic School, and completed a four-year apprenticeship as a lift engineer before turning professional with Tottenham Hotspur. His brother Henry played football for Crystal Palace, Leyton Orient and Brentford, and for the Republic of Ireland under-21 team in 1981.

Hughton and wife Cheryl have four children: two daughters and two sons. Son Cian also became a footballer; he began his career with Tottenham Hotspur, represented the Republic of Ireland at under-21 level, and played in the Football League for Lincoln City.

In April 2026, Hughton announced he was diagnosed with prostate cancer in April 2025 and successfully treated for it in May that year.

Hughton wrote a column for the Workers' Revolutionary Party publication News Line in the 1970s. He is a member of the Labour Party.

== Managerial statistics ==
As of 3 April 2025

Managerial record by team and tenure
Team	From	To	Record					Ref(s)
Team	From	To	P	W	D	L	Win %	Ref(s)
Tottenham Hotspur (interim)	25 June 1995	23 July 1995	4	1	0	3	25.00	
Tottenham Hotspur (interim)	20 November 1997	25 November 1997	1	0	0	1	0.00	
Tottenham Hotspur (interim)	7 September 1998	1 October 1998	6	3	2	1	50.00	
Newcastle United (interim)	8 September 2008	29 September 2008	4	0	0	4	0.00	
Newcastle United (interim)	7 February 2009	31 March 2009	6	1	2	3	16.67	
Newcastle United	1 June 2009	6 December 2010	70	39	17	14	55.71	
Birmingham City	22 June 2011	7 June 2012	62	26	21	15	41.94	
Norwich City	7 June 2012	6 April 2014	82	24	23	35	29.27	
Brighton & Hove Albion	31 December 2014	13 May 2019	215	88	57	70	40.93	
Nottingham Forest	6 October 2020	16 September 2021	53	14	17	22	26.42	
Ghana	20 March 2023	23 January 2024	13	4	5	4	30.77	
Total			516	200	144	172	38.76	

== Honours ==
=== Player ===
Tottenham Hotspur

- FA Cup: 1980–81, 1981–82; runner-up: 1986–87
- UEFA Cup: 1983–84
- FA Charity Shield: 1981 (shared)
- Football League Cup runner-up: 1981–82

Brentford

- Football League Third Division: 1991–92

=== Manager ===
Newcastle United

- Football League Championship: 2009–10

Brighton & Hove Albion

- EFL Championship second-place promotion: 2016–17

Individual

- Football League / EFL Championship Manager of the Month: August 2009, September 2009, November 2009, April 2010, October 2011, January 2012, August 2015, April 2016, December 2016
- Football League Championship LMA Manager of the Year: 2009–10, 2015–16, 2016–17
- England Athletics Coach of the Year at the Lycamobile British Ethnic Diversity Sports Awards (BEDSAs): 2017
- Best of Africa Awards Outstanding Achievement in Management: 2017, 2018
- Honorary doctorate, University of Sussex
- Premier League Manager of the Month: February 2018

== See also ==
- List of Republic of Ireland international footballers born outside the Republic of Ireland
