= Paul Price (footballer) =

Wales international footballer

Personal information
- Full name: Paul Terence Price
- Date of birth: 23 March 1954 (age 72)
- Place of birth: St Albans, Hertfordshire, England
- Height: 5 ft 11 in (1.80 m)
- Position: Central defender

Senior career*
Years	Team	Apps	(Gls)
1971–1981	Luton Town	207	(8)
1977–1978	→ Minnesota Kicks (loan)	24	(2)
1981–1984	Tottenham Hotspur	39	(0)
1984	Minnesota Strikers	8	(0)
1985–1986	Swansea City	61	(1)
1986–1988	Peterborough United	86	(0)
- Chelmsford City
1988-1991	Wivenhoe Town	157	(4)
- St Albans City
Total		582	(15)

International career
1980–1984	Wales	25	(1)

Managerial career
- 2009–2010: Western Knights
- Sorrento
- Armadale
- * Club domestic league appearances and goals

Paul Price (born 23 March 1954) is a former professional footballer. He played for Welwyn Garden City, Luton Town, Tottenham Hotspur, Swansea City, Minnesota Strikers, Peterborough United, St Albans City and was an international for Wales. He played in the position of central defender.

== Football career ==
Price joined Luton Town from Welwyn Garden City in July 1971 and made 207 appearances for the club including one as substitute and scoring eight goals. In 1977 and 1978, Luton Town loaned Price to the Minnesota Kicks of the North American Soccer League. In June 1981 he transferred in a £250,000 deal to Spurs. He made his debut at Middlesbrough in August 1981. Price featured in both matches of the 1982 FA Cup Final and also played in the 1982 Football League Cup Final the same year. Making a total of 62 appearances in all competitions including four as sub and scoring one goal for the club. Price joined the Minnesota Strikers of the NASL in 1984 on a free transfer from Tottenham and then joined Swansea City in January 1985 and went on to make 62 League appearances for the club. He returned to England to play a further 86 times at Peterborough United, before finishing his career in non league with Saltash United, Chelmsford City, Wivenhoe Town and St Albans City.

== International career ==
Price made a total of 27 appearances for Wales and scored once and was the first English born captain of Wales from 1982 to 1984.

== Managerial career ==
Price was appointed manager of the Western Australian Football League team Western Knights in 2009. and later moved to coach Sorrento in 2011. Price recently took upon the role as manager of Armadale in 2015 – competing in NPL WA.

== Post-football career ==
After retiring from the game, Price went into property development before moving to Australia where he works in house renovation and property sales.

== Honours ==
Tottenham Hotspur

- FA Cup: 1981–82
- FA Charity Shield: 1981 (shared)
- UEFA Cup: 1983–84
- Football League Cup runner-up: 1981–82
