= Ray Clemence =

English footballer (1948–2020)

Ray Clemence MBE
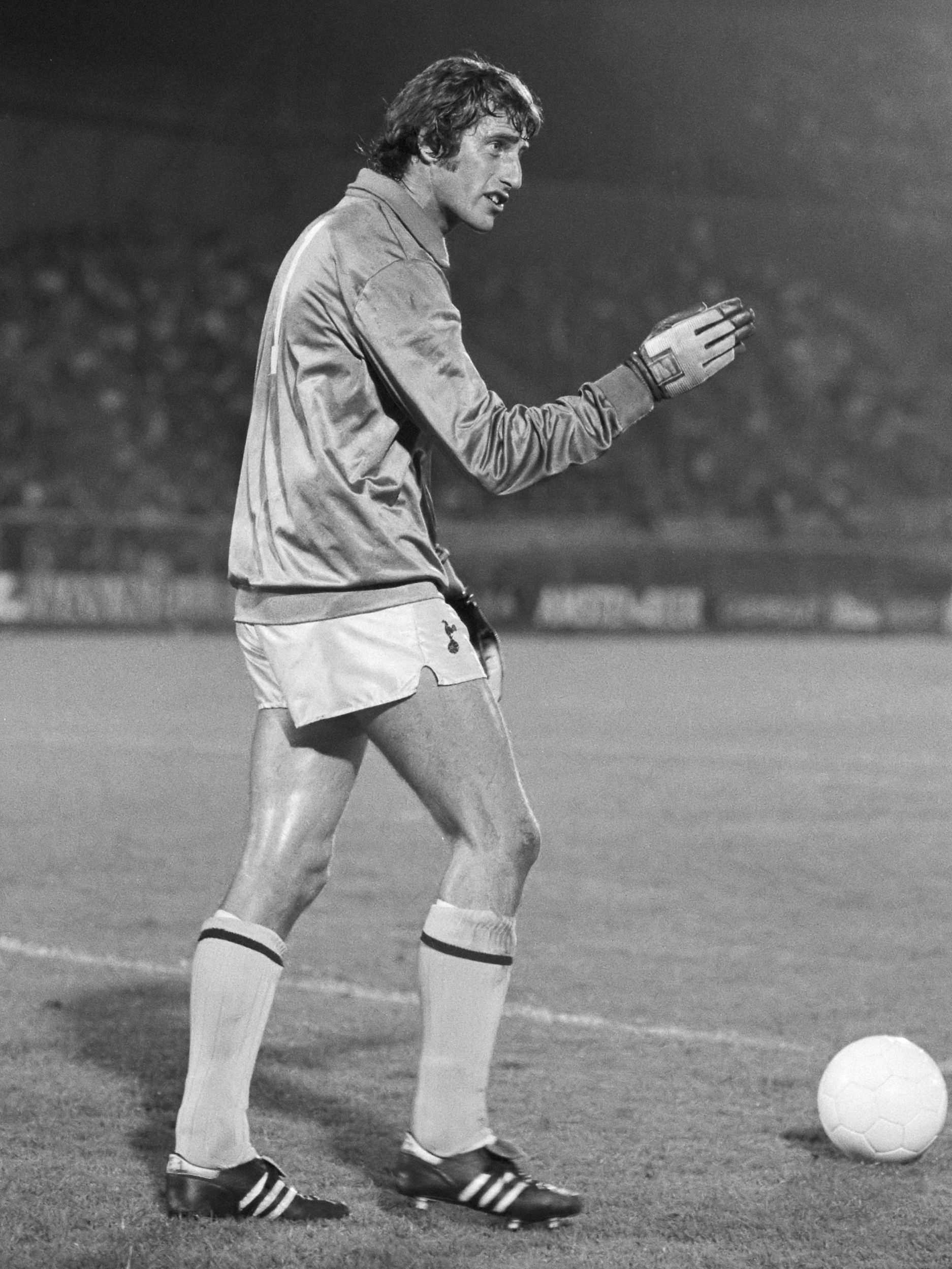
- Clemence with Tottenham Hotspur in 1981

Personal information
- Full name: Raymond Neal Clemence
- Date of birth: 5 August 1948
- Place of birth: Skegness, Lincolnshire, England
- Date of death: 15 November 2020 (aged 72)
- Place of death: Broxbourne, Hertfordshire, England
- Height: 6 ft 0 in (1.83 m)
- Position: Goalkeeper

Youth career
- Notts County

Senior career*
Years	Team	Apps	(Gls)
1965–1967	Scunthorpe United	48	(0)
1967–1981	Liverpool	470	(0)
1981–1988	Tottenham Hotspur	240	(0)
Total		758	(0)

International career
1967–1971	England U23	4	(0)
1972–1983	England	61	(0)

Managerial career
- 1992–1993: Tottenham Hotspur
- 1994–1996: Barnet
- * Club domestic league appearances and goals

Raymond Neal Clemence MBE (5 August 1948 – 15 November 2020) was an English professional footballer who played as a goalkeeper. Regarded as one of the greatest goalkeepers of all time, he is one of the few players to have made over 1,100 career appearances. With 568 clean sheets, he is also the record holder in most clean sheets, if taking into account all levels. Taking into account only the professional level, Fábio of Brazil holds the record, with 521 clean sheets.

As part of the Liverpool team of the 1970s, Clemence won three European Cups, five League titles, two UEFA Cups, a European Super Cup, an FA Cup and a League Cup; the last of his 665 appearances for the club was the victorious 1981 European Cup final. In 1981, after being phased out at Liverpool, Clemence joined Tottenham Hotspur, winning a UEFA Cup, an FA Cup, and a Charity Shield with them, before retiring from football in 1988. Clemence played internationally for England from 1972 to 1983, and represented the country at UEFA Euro 1980 and the 1982 FIFA World Cup.

After brief spells as joint-manager at Tottenham (alongside Doug Livermore) and sole manager at Barnet in the first half of the 90s, he acted as head of the FA Development Team, overseeing the development made by players in the England youth teams from under-16 to 21 level, having previously been part of the England senior team's backroom staff.

== Club career ==
=== Scunthorpe United ===
Born in Skegness, Lincolnshire, Clemence played eight matches on trial for Notts County, but was ultimately not signed by the Meadow Lane club. He was spotted by Scunthorpe United whilst playing in a county-cup final at their Old Showground ground for his local youth club Skegness Cosmos. After starring in the Cosmos' 4-3 victory, Clemence was invited for formal trials with The Iron, which he duly passed. Clemence went on to sign professional terms for Scunthorpe on his 17th birthday, 5 August 1965, shortly before the start of Scunthorpe's 1965–66 Third Division campaign.

Despite initially playing in the club's 'third team', Clemence's big break arrived later in his debut season – making his professional debut in a 1–1 draw at home to Swansea Town on 2 April 1966. Prior to this debut, Clemence remembers a key behind-the-scenes intervention from two Scunthorpe coaches: "Jack Brownsword and Alan Bushby pulled me aside, gave me a pep talk and told me they thought I could play for England one day but 'you've got to work at it'".

Clemence went on to make four appearances in total throughout his debut season, including earning his first professional clean sheet in a 1–0 victory away at Southend United. Having spent much of that season as understudy to the experienced former Wolverhampton Wanderers and Aston Villa custodian Geoff Sidebottom, Clemence later cited Sidebottom as a crucial early mentor: "I learned a lot from Geoff. He taught me how to look after myself because 'keepers were a lot less protected then."

During his time at the club, Clemence lived with Mrs Ruby Duce of King Edward Street in Scunthorpe; in the very same digs which would then immediately be occupied by his future England and Liverpool teammate Kevin Keegan following Clemence's departure to Liverpool.

After being reintroduced to the side after they had lost their opening three games in all competitions, Clemence became Scunthorpe's undisputed first-choice goalkeeper in their following 1966–67 Third Division campaign, in which they finished a disappointing 18th. After manager and ex-Busby Babe Freddie Goodwin departed mid-season for the New York Generals in the nascent North American Soccer League, Clemence spent the latter half of his season under the guidance of caretaker player-manager Keith Burkinshaw, who would later also sign the player for Tottenham Hotspur.

And despite Clemence himself worrying that a humiliating 7–1 defeat away to arch-rivals Grimsby Town could end his professional career, Scunthorpe's faith in him never waivered and this defeat proved to be the second game in a run of 46 consecutive starts he made to see out all of Scunthorpe's remaining league and cup matches.

This run took Clemence's figures to 50 appearances and 12 clean sheets in all competitions for Scunthorpe; but unbeknownst to him, he had been scouted in 12 games by legendary Liverpool manager Bill Shankly and his coaching staff. This came to fruition later that summer, when Clemence was forced to leave a beachside deckchair-stacking shift early, with the news that an urgent telegram awaited him at home. This was because Liverpool's bid for the now 18-year-old shot-stopper had been accepted, and the Scunthorpe chairman personally drove Clemence to Anfield in his Rolls-Royce the next morning.

Looking back on his time with the club, Clemence fondly recalled how Scunthorpe United was: "A club I'm proud to be associated with. While I was there, it was like being part of a family.

=== Liverpool ===
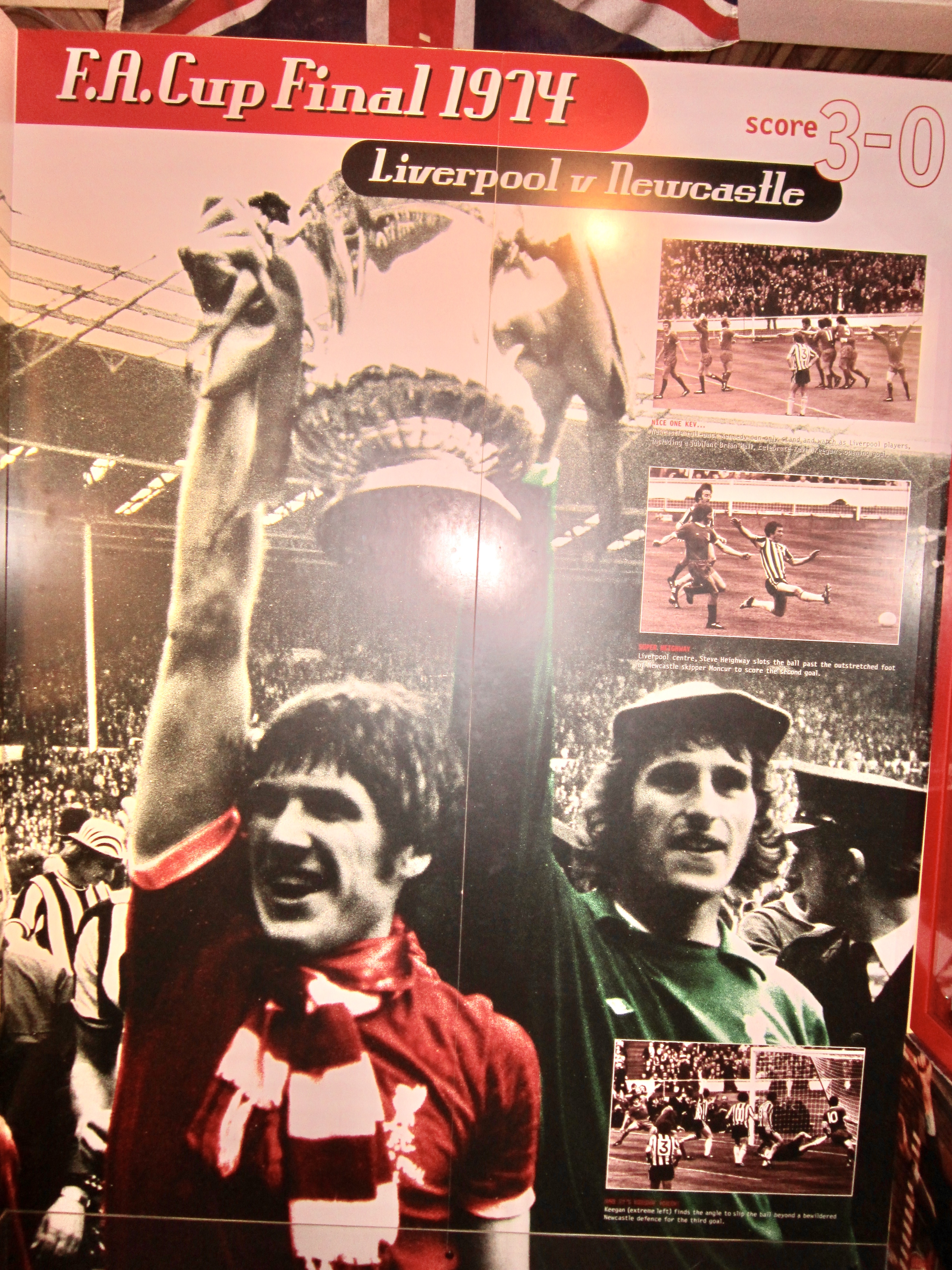
Image of Clemence (right) with Emlyn Hughes in the Liverpool F.C. museum commemorating the club's 1974 FA Cup final victory

Clemence was signed by Liverpool manager Bill Shankly on 24 June 1967 from Scunthorpe United for a fee of £18,000. He made his debut and kept his first clean sheet in a League Cup third round tie at Anfield on 25 September 1968, Swansea Town were the visitors and were beaten 2–0. He was nurtured through the reserve side over the next two years, with the occasional senior appearance, until 1970, at which point he became the club's first choice goalkeeper.

In 1971, Liverpool reached the FA Cup final, where Clemence played well but Arsenal scored twice in extra time to overcome Liverpool's lead and win the game 2–1. There would be joy for Clemence two seasons later in 1973, when Liverpool won both the League title and UEFA Cup, with Clemence saving a penalty from Jupp Heynckes in the final of the latter against Borussia Mönchengladbach. The penalty save meant that Liverpool took a 3–0 lead for the second leg, rather than 3–1. Gladbach went on to win 2–0 in the second leg; had Heynckes scored the penalty, then the tie would have finished 3–3 on aggregate and Gladbach would have won on the away goals rule. The 1973–74 season saw Liverpool claim yet more silverware, winning the FA Cup with a comprehensive 3–0 victory over Newcastle United.

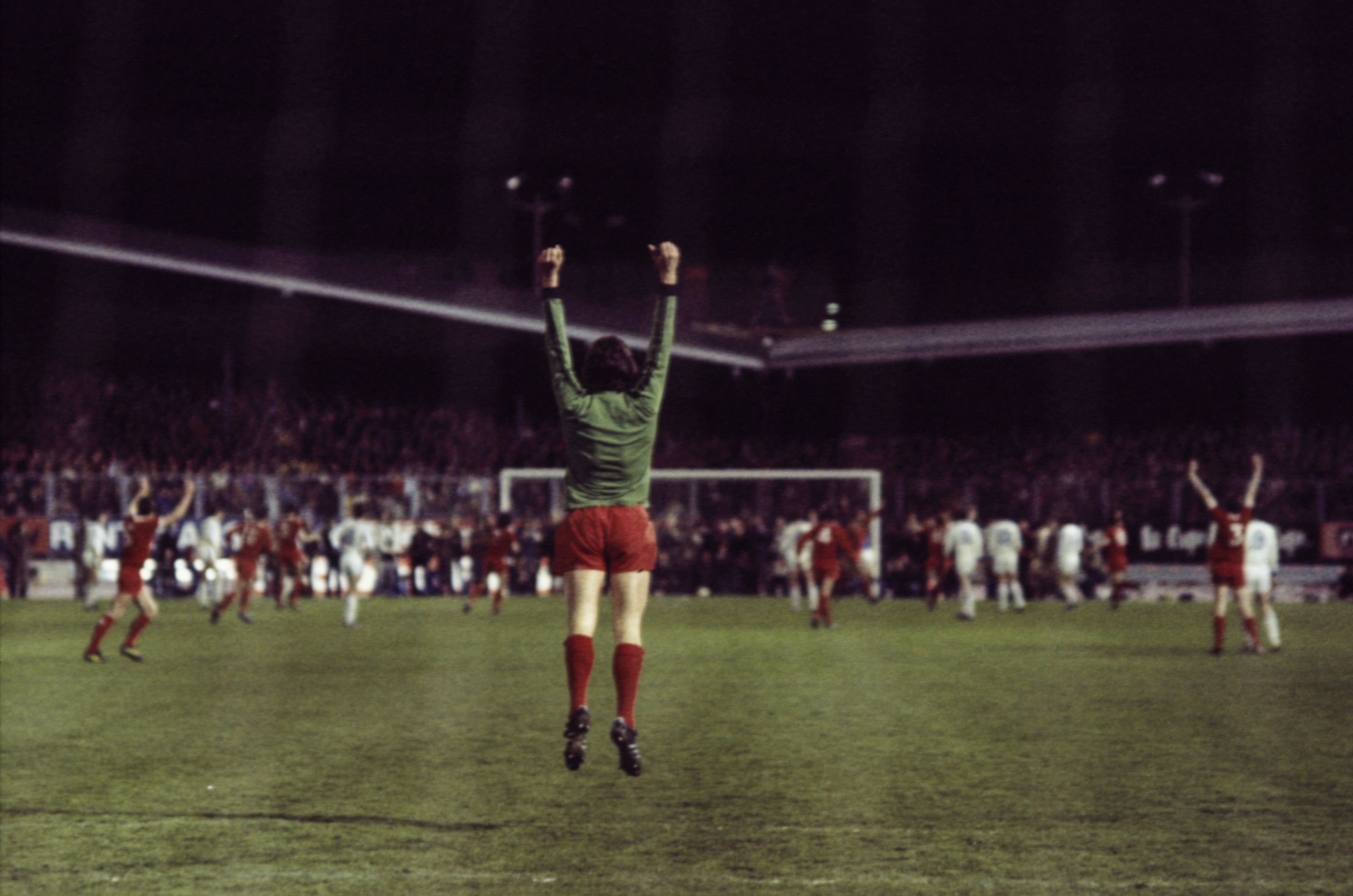
Clemence celebrating Liverpool's European Cup semi-final victory over FC Zürich, 1977

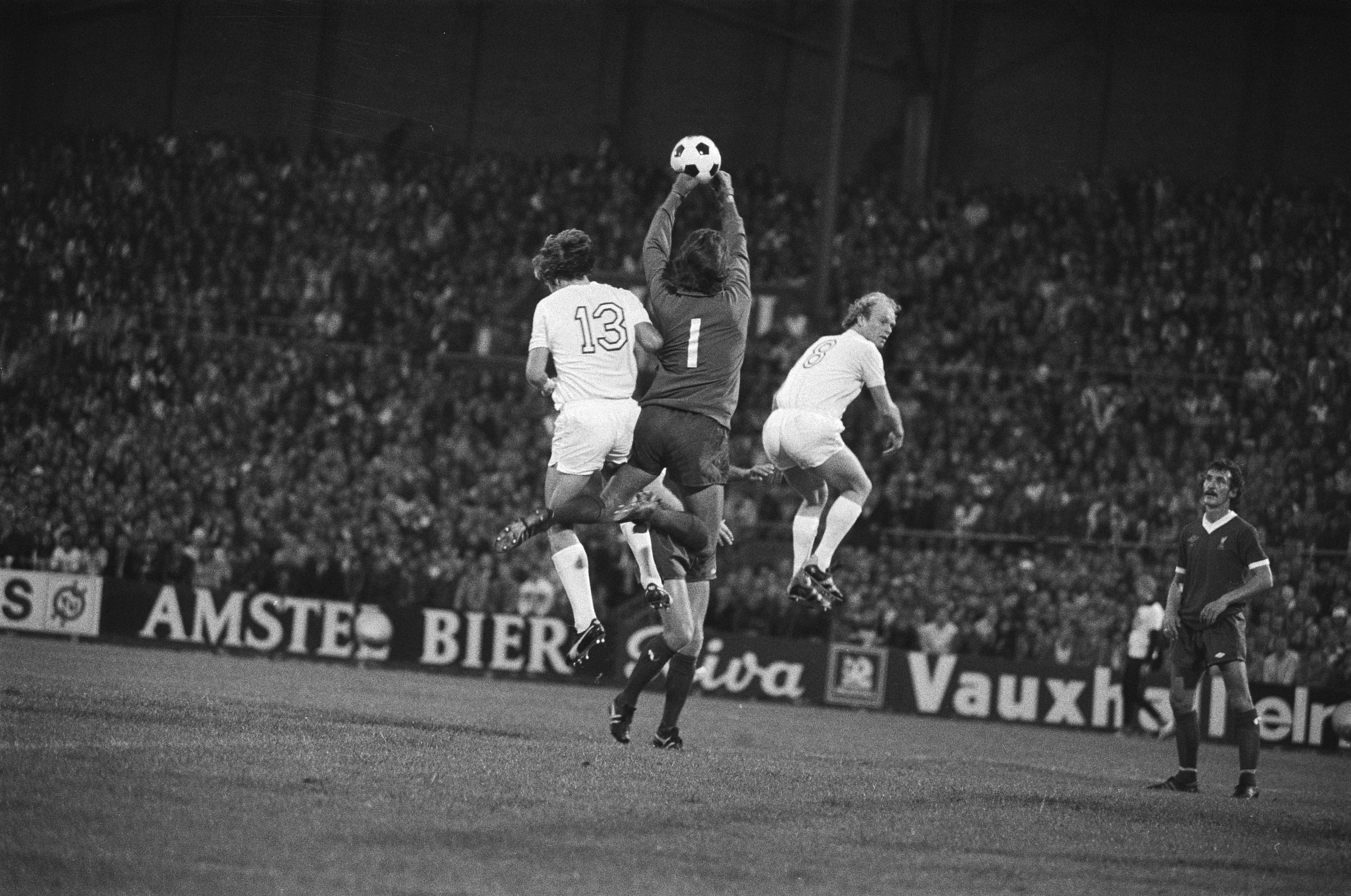
Clemence claiming the ball in a match against Ajax, during the 1977 Amsterdam Tournament

Liverpool won another League and UEFA Cup double in 1976 and then made a bid for a unique treble a year later. They achieved the first leg when they won the League title, but lost the FA Cup final 2–1 to rivals Manchester United. A few days later, Liverpool won the European Cup for the first time in Rome, defeating Borussia Mönchengladbach 3–1. In the second half, Clemence made a magnificent save against Uli Stielike when the score was 1–1.

Liverpool retained the European Cup in 1978 with a narrow 1–0 win over Club Brugge at Wembley, but conceded their League title to Nottingham Forest, to whom they also lost in the League Cup final. In 1979 and 1980, Clemence kept goal as Liverpool clinched the League title in each season. The 1978–79 League success saw Clemence set a record that was never beaten under the two points for a win system, conceding only 16 goals in the 42 league matches (and just four at Anfield). This remarkable record remains for a 42-match season and endured until beaten in the 2004–05 season by Chelsea, who conceded 15 goals in the 38 League matches.

In 1981, Liverpool won the League Cup, and for the third time the European Cup, the latter with a 1–0 win over Real Madrid in a dour contest at the Parc des Princes on 27 May. It turned out to be Clemence's last game for the club. The emergence of Bruce Grobbelaar put Clemence's place in the side under threat for the first time in eleven years (during which period he played in more than 650 matches and missed a mere six), and he decided to leave Liverpool to join Tottenham Hotspur for a fee of £300,000.

=== Tottenham Hotspur ===
Clemence left Liverpool to join Tottenham Hotspur in 1981 for a fee of £300,000. The two clubs reached the 1982 League Cup final, which Liverpool won 3–1. Despite this, however, they won the 1982 FA Cup, defeating Queens Park Rangers 1–0 after a replay.

Clemence's first Tottenham appearance was in the 1981 FA Charity Shield against Aston Villa at Wembley on 22 August 1981, where Mark Falco and Peter Withe each scored twice in an entertaining 2–2 draw. His League debut came a week later with a winning start at Ayresome Park, where they beat Middlesbrough 3–1. His first clean sheet came three games later on 12 September at Molineux, when he kept Wolverhampton Wanderers off the scoresheet in the 1–0 victory.

Tottenham won the UEFA Cup in 1984. Clemence missed the final against Anderlecht through injury, but was on the bench as substitute goalkeeper in a match famously won when Tony Parks saved twice during the penalty shootout. Clemence reached a fifth FA Cup final in 1987, where his side lost to Coventry City. He is in a select group of players who have appeared in five or more FA Cup finals. He sustained an Achilles tendon injury in Tottenham's away match at Norwich in October 1987, which forced his retirement from playing in 1988. Shortly after retiring, Clemence joined the Tottenham coaching staff.

Throughout his career, he played over 1,100 career appearances, remaining one of the very few players to have done so. According to the RSSSF, he is the fifth player with the most official competitive appearances in world football, only behind Stanley Matthews, Cristiano Ronaldo, Fábio, and Peter Shilton.

== International career ==
Clemence was a regular for England between 1972 and 1983, making his debut and keeping his first clean-sheet in the 1–0 World Cup qualifier win over Wales at Ninian Park on 15 November 1972. England failed to qualify for World Cups in 1974 and 1978. Clemence was part of the squad that qualified for UEFA Euro 1980 but the team failed to qualify from Group 2. In 1982, he was in the squad for the World Cup, but again England did not progress beyond the quarter-final stage.

Clemence captained England once — the first keeper to do so since Frank Swift. The game in question was a 1981 friendly with Brazil at Wembley, although Clemence couldn't prevent the Brazilians from scoring as England lost 1–0.

Because of injury to his left knee, Clemence was retired from international football with 61 England caps in a 12-year international career. The presence of another goalkeeper, Peter Shilton, meant that the England management struggled to decide which keeper was the best, and ended up alternating their selection. Shilton ended up as first-choice keeper for the rest of the 1980s, playing in two more World Cups and attaining a record 125 caps.

== Coaching career ==
=== Management ===
Clemence retired in 1988 and joined the coaching staff at Tottenham, working his way through to the first team, before leaving to become joint manager of Barnet (with fellow goalkeeper Gary Phillips) in January 1994. At the start of the 1994–95 season, he took sole charge leading Barnet to ninth and 13th in the Third Division.

=== England coaching team ===
In August 1996, he was recruited by his former Spurs and England teammate Glenn Hoddle as goalkeeping coach for the England national team, a position he continued to hold under Hoddle's successors Kevin Keegan and Sven-Göran Eriksson. He remained in that position under Steve McClaren, until he was replaced by Italian Franco Tancredi as goalkeeping coach in December 2007, as Fabio Capello took charge of the national team. Clemence, however, remained part of the England backroom staff, and when Roy Hodgson took over as manager, he reinstated Clemence as goalkeeper coach. On 11 June 2012, he snapped his Achilles tendon during England's warmups for their game against France during UEFA Euro 2012. He was also England's Head of international teams, managing all the junior, women's and disability teams.

In 2013, Clemence retired; being "lavishly saluted", and being bought a gift from the England team; despite his last appearance at an international level being 30 years earlier.

== Personal life and death ==
Clemence was appointed an MBE in the 1987 Birthday Honours for services to football. His son, Stephen was a midfield player who came through the ranks at Tottenham Hotspur and Birmingham City, before retiring because of injury at Leicester City in 2010. He was appointed manager of Gillingham in 2023, then Barrow in 2024. Clemence's daughter Sarah also has footballing connections, being the wife of former Crystal Palace and Nottingham Forest manager and Scotland striker Dougie Freedman. He also occasionally worked as a pundit on TV and radio, and commented on current goalkeeping stories in football.

In February 2005, Clemence announced that he had been diagnosed with prostate cancer and that he would spend time away from the England squad whilst he received treatment. He was the second member of Eriksson's staff to be diagnosed with prostate cancer; Brian Kidd was diagnosed with the disease prior to UEFA Euro 2004. He died from prostate cancer at his home in Broxbourne on 15 November 2020, at the age of 72.

Clemence is held in high regard by both Liverpool and Tottenham fans. He was voted in at No. 11 on the Liverpool Football Club web site poll 100 Players Who Shook The Kop; he was also the highest placed goalkeeper. He was also chosen as goalkeeper in the BBC's Merseyside team of the 20th century, and topped Total Football's poll of the best ever goalkeeper, beating players of the calibre of Peter Shilton, Lev Yashin, Gordon Banks and Pat Jennings. Shortly before his death, a mural near Anfield, Liverpool's football stadium, was created in his honour.

== Career statistics ==
=== Club ===
Appearances and goals by club, season and competition
Club	Season	League			FA Cup		League Cup		Charity Shield		Europe		Other		Total	
Club	Season	Division	Apps	Goals	Apps	Goals	Apps	Goals	Apps	Goals	Apps	Goals	Apps	Goals	Apps	Goals
Scunthorpe United	1965–66	Third Division	4	0											4	0
Scunthorpe United	1966–67	Third Division	44	0	2	0									46	0
Scunthorpe United	Total		48	0	2	0									50	0
Liverpool	1967–68	First Division														
Liverpool	1968–69	First Division					1	0							1	0
Liverpool	1969–70	First Division	14	0	1	0					2	0			17	0
Liverpool	1970–71	First Division	41	0	7	0	3	0			10	0			61	0
Liverpool	1971–72	First Division	42	0	3	0	3	0	1	0	4	0			53	0
Liverpool	1972–73	First Division	41	0	4	0	7	0			12	0			64	0
Liverpool	1973–74	First Division	42	0	9	0	6	0			4	0			61	0
Liverpool	1974–75	First Division	42	0	2	0	4	0	1	0	4	0			53	0
Liverpool	1975–76	First Division	42	0	2	0	3	0			12	0			59	0
Liverpool	1976–77	First Division	42	0	8	0	2	0	1	0	9	0			62	0
Liverpool	1977–78	First Division	40	0	1	0	9	0	1	0	7	0	2	0	60	0
Liverpool	1978–79	First Division	42	0	7	0	1	0			2	0	1	0	53	0
Liverpool	1979–80	First Division	41	0	8	0	7	0	1	0	2	0			59	0
Liverpool	1980–81	First Division	41	0	2	0	9	0	1	0	9	0			62	0
Liverpool	Total		470	0	54	0	55	0	6	0	77	0	3	0	665	0
Tottenham Hotspur	1981–82	First Division	38	0	7	0	8	0	1	0	8	0			62	0
Tottenham Hotspur	1982–83	First Division	41	0	3	0	5	0	1	0	4	0			54	0
Tottenham Hotspur	1983–84	First Division	26	0	1	0	3	0			7	0			37	0
Tottenham Hotspur	1984–85	First Division	42	0	3	0	5	0			8	0			58	0
Tottenham Hotspur	1985–86	First Division	42	0	5	0	6	0					5	0	58	0
Tottenham Hotspur	1986–87	First Division	40	0	6	0	9	0							55	0
Tottenham Hotspur	1987–88	First Division	11	0			2	0							13	0
Tottenham Hotspur	Total		240	0	25	0	38	0	2	0	27	0	5	0	337	0
Career total			758	0	81	0	93	0	8	0	104	0	8	0	1052	0

=== International ===
Appearances and goals by national team and year
National team	Year	Apps	Goals
England	1972	1	0
England	1973	1	0
England	1974	4	0
England	1975	8	0
England	1976	9	0
England	1977	9	0
England	1978	5	0
England	1979	7	0
England	1980	7	0
England	1981	5	0
England	1982	3	0
England	1983	1	0
Total		61	0

== Honours ==
Scunthorpe United

- Lincolnshire Senior Cup: 1965–66 (Shared)

Liverpool

- Football League First Division: 1972–73, 1975–76, 1976–77, 1978–79, 1979–80
- FA Cup: 1973–74; runner-up: 1970–71, 1976–77
- Football League Cup: 1980–81; runner-up: 1977–78
- FA Charity Shield: 1974, 1976, 1977 (shared), 1979, 1980
- European Cup: 1976–77, 1977–78, 1980–81
- UEFA Cup: 1972–73, 1975–76
- European Super Cup: 1977

Tottenham Hotspur

- FA Cup: 1981–82; runner-up: 1986–87
- FA Charity Shield: 1981 (shared)
- UEFA Cup: 1983–84
- Football League Cup runner-up: 1981–82

Individual

- PFA Team of the Year: 1976–77 First Division

== See also ==
- List of men's footballers with the most official appearances
