= 1982 Football League Cup final =

- Match programme cover
- Event: 1981–82 Football League Cup
Liverpool	Tottenham Hotspur
3	1
- After extra time
- Date: 13 March 1982
- Venue: Wembley Stadium, London
- Referee: Peter Willis (County Durham)
- Attendance: 100,000

The 1982 Football League Cup final was a football match between Liverpool and Tottenham Hotspur on 13 March 1982 at Wembley Stadium. It was the final match of the 1981–82 Football League Cup, the 22nd staging of the Football League Cup, a football competition for the 92 teams in The Football League. Liverpool were the reigning champions and appearing in their third final. This was Tottenham's third final, having won their previous two appearances in 1971 and 1973.

Both teams entered the competition in the second round. Liverpool's matches were generally comfortable victories. They beat Middlesbrough 4–1 in the third round, but two of their ties went to a replay. Tottenham's matches were close affairs, the only match they won by more than one goal was their 2–0 victory against Wrexham in the third round, although they did not concede a single goal en route to the final.

Watched by a crowd of 100,000, Tottenham opened the scoring in the 11th minute when striker Steve Archibald scored. Tottenham maintained their lead until the 87th minute, when midfielder Ronnie Whelan equalised for Liverpool. With the scores level after 90 minutes the match went to extra time. Whelan scored again in the 111th minute to give Liverpool the lead and striker Ian Rush scored in the 119th minute to secure a 3–1 victory for Liverpool. It was their second League Cup victory and second in succession. The year before, Ray Clemence played for Liverpool, only to be on the losing side against his former team in 1982.

== Route to the final ==
Liverpool		Round	Tottenham Hotspur	
Exeter City; H 5–0	Rush 15', 67', McDermott 27'; Dalglish 37', Whelan 68'	Second Round, First Leg	Manchester United; H 1–0	Archibald
Exeter City; A 6–0	Rush 15', 78', Dalglish 23', Neal 34', Sheedy 53', Mather og 80'	Second Round, Second Leg	Manchester United; A 1–0	Hazard
Middlesbrough; H 4–1	Sheedy 29', Rush 64', Johnson 74', 80'	Third Round	Wrexham; H 2–0	Hughton, Hoddle
Arsenal; A 0–0		Fourth Round	Fulham; H 1–0	Hazard
Arsenal; H 3–0 (aet)	Johnston 95', McDermott 101' (pen), Dalglish 108'	Replay		
Barnsley; H 0–0		Fifth Round	Nottingham Forest; H 1–0	Ardiles
Barnsley; H 3–1	Souness 37', Johnson 81', Dalglish 89'	Replay		
Ipswich Town; A 2–0	McDermott 47', Rush 49'	Semi-finals, First Leg	West Bromwich Albion; A 0–0	
Ipswich Town; H 2–2	Rush 26', Dalglish 47'	Semi-finals, Second Leg	West Bromwich Albion; H 1–0	Hazard

== Pre-match ==
Both teams were playing in the First Division, English football's top division at the time. At the start of the day of the final, Liverpool were in 4th position and Spurs in 7th.

== Match ==
=== Details ===
13 March 1982
15:00 GMT

Liverpool	3–1 (a.e.t.)	Tottenham Hotspur
Whelan 87', 111'; Rush 119'	Report	Archibald 11'

Wembley Stadium, London
Referee: Peter Willis (Meadowfield, County Durham)

Liverpool	Tottenham Hotspur

GK	1	(Zimbabwe) Bruce Grobbelaar
RB	2	(England) Phil Neal
CB	3	(Republic of Ireland) Mark Lawrenson
LB	4	(England) Alan Kennedy
LM	5	(Republic of Ireland) Ronnie Whelan
CB	6	(England) Phil Thompson
CF	7	(Scotland) Kenny Dalglish
RM	8	(England) Sammy Lee
CF	9	(Wales) Ian Rush
CM	10	(England) Terry McDermott	Substituted off
CM	11	(Scotland) Graeme Souness (c)
Substitute:
	12	(England) David Johnson	Substituted on
Manager:
(England) Bob Paisley

GK	1	(England) Ray Clemence
LB	2	(Republic of Ireland) Chris Hughton
CB	3	(England) Paul Miller
CB	4	(Wales) Paul Price
RM	5	(England) Micky Hazard	Substituted off
RB	6	(England) Steve Perryman (c)
CM	7	(Argentina) Osvaldo Ardiles
CF	8	(Scotland) Steve Archibald
LM	9	(Republic of Ireland) Tony Galvin
CM	10	(England) Glenn Hoddle
CF	11	(England) Garth Crooks
Substitute:
MF	12	(Argentina) Ricardo Villa	Substituted on
Manager:
(England) Keith Burkinshaw

== Post-match ==
After their victory in the League Cup, Liverpool went on to win the First Division title, finishing four points ahead of runners-up Ipswich Town. Tottenham finished the season in 4th place and beat Queens Park Rangers in a replay to win the 1982 FA Cup final.
