= Clive White =

English football referee

Clive Bradley White (born 2 May 1940) is a retired English football referee from Harrow, Middlesex.

== Career ==
White made the Football League referees list at the age of thirty three in 1973, after four years as a linesman. He made rapid progress, was senior linesman at the 1977 FA Cup Final and was appointed to the FIFA Panel in Summer 1977. He achieved the honour of refereeing the 1982 FA Cup Final, featuring two London clubs, Tottenham Hotspur and QPR. He also handled the subsequent replay, eventually awarding Tottenham the penalty with which they won the Cup.

He then went on to referee in the 1982 World Cup Finals in Spain. He featured in three matches - refereeing the first round Group C match between Belgium and Hungary, which ended 1–1, and acting as a linesman for the first round Group F game when the Soviet Union beat New Zealand 3–0 and for the goalless draw between Poland and the Soviet Union in the second round.

At this stage White seemed to have marked himself out as the leading English referee with potentially another six years before retirement. However, soon after, he was convicted of deception and resigned from the League list on 30 July 1982.

Preceded by Keith Hackett	FA Cup Final Referee; 1982	Succeeded by Alf Grey
