= 1982 FA Cup final =

Association football championship match

- Event: 1981–82 FA Cup
Tottenham Hotspur	Queens Park Rangers
- Tottenham Hotspur won after a replay

Final
Tottenham Hotspur	Queens Park Rangers
1	1
- After extra time
- Date: 22 May 1982
- Venue: Wembley Stadium, London
- Referee: Clive White (Middlesex)
- Attendance: 100,000

Replay
Tottenham Hotspur	Queens Park Rangers
1	0
- Date: 27 May 1982
- Venue: Wembley Stadium, London
- Referee: Clive White (Middlesex)
- Attendance: 100,000

The 1982 FA Cup final was the 101st final of the FA Cup and took place on 22 May 1982 at Wembley Stadium. It was contested between Tottenham Hotspur and Queens Park Rangers.

Tottenham were the cup holders and were hot favourites, while QPR had narrowly missed out on promotion from the Second Division.

It would be the last final involving a team from outside the top flight for ten years.

Tottenham's victory meant that they had then won the FA Cup seven times – matching the record set by Aston Villa 25 years earlier. It also preserved their unbeaten record in FA Cup finals.

Tottenham's Argentinian players Ricky Villa and Osvaldo Ardiles did not play due to the Falklands War. Ardiles was away on international duty and due to the war was unable to return to London, so Tottenham loaned him to French club Paris Saint-Germain. Villa said he decided not to play in the final because of the ongoing Falklands War.

== Road to Wembley ==
=== Tottenham Hotspur ===
Home teams listed first. Round 3: Tottenham Hotspur 1–0 Arsenal

Round 4: Tottenham Hotspur 1–0 Leeds United

Round 5: Tottenham Hotspur 1–0 Aston Villa

Round 6: Chelsea 2–3 Tottenham Hotspur

Semi-final: Tottenham Hotspur 2–0 Leicester City (at Villa Park, Birmingham)

=== Queens Park Rangers ===
Home teams listed first. Round 3: Queens Park Rangers 1–1 Middlesbrough

Replay: Middlesbrough 2–3 Queens Park Rangers

Round 4: Blackpool 0–0 Queens Park Rangers

Replay: Queens Park Rangers 5–1 Blackpool

Round 5: Queens Park Rangers 3–1 Grimsby Town

Round 6: Queens Park Rangers 1–0 Crystal Palace

Semi-final: West Bromwich Albion 0–1 Queens Park Rangers (at Highbury, London)

== Match summary ==
The first game was a tense and largely dull game of few clear cut chances. QPR's young goalkeeper Peter Hucker was certainly the busier keeper although Spurs were mainly being kept to long range efforts. Hucker's performance in the first match would ultimately earn him the Man of the Match award thanks to the one telephone vote he received from Neil Richards. QPR were not outclassed however, although their attacking options were hindered when prolific striker Clive Allen, who had scored the winner in the semi-final, was injured early in the game and was a peripheral figure thereafter. He was replaced by Gary Micklewhite five minutes into the second half. Ninety minutes came and went with the score 0–0. With ten minutes of extra time remaining, Glenn Hoddle found himself just outside the QPR penalty box. His shot took a deflection (off Tony Currie) and found the right-hand corner of Hucker's goal. Not to be outdone, five minutes later Simon Stainrod took a long throw ten yards from the Spurs goal line. Rangers' burly centre-back Bob Hazell, flicked the ball on at the near post and Terry Fenwick headed the ball past Spurs keeper Ray Clemence at point-blank range, making the final score 1–1.

== Replay ==
The replay took place at Wembley five days later. Clive Allen had not recovered from his injury and his replacement on the Saturday, Gary Micklewhite, started the game. Early in the game after only six minutes had elapsed, the Spurs midfielder Graham Roberts broke through into the Rangers penalty area. Rangers' captain on the evening, Tony Currie (regular captain Glenn Roeder was suspended), made a lunge to get the ball but only succeeded in bringing Roberts down. It was a clear penalty. Glenn Hoddle coolly slotted the penalty away sending Peter Hucker the wrong way. QPR soon managed to get into the game though and before long had the ball in the net by Micklewhite, but the goal was disallowed for an offside against Stainrod. It was fair to say that for much of the rest of the game they were the better side, taking the game to their more highly fancied opponents. The only thing they could not manage to do was score. The closest they came was in the second half when John Gregory received a raking long pass from the left wing from Simon Stainrod and spotted Spurs keeper Ray Clemence slightly off his line. Gregory's audacious volleyed chip from just inside the box however, agonisingly hit the crossbar and bounced to safety. Steve Archibald hit the post late on for Spurs but Hoddle's early penalty remained the only goal, and Spurs retained the trophy just as they had done in 1962. Spurs became the only team to win three FA Cup Final replays, as well as the only team to win FA Cup Final replays in successive years.

== Match details ==
22 May 1982

Tottenham Hotspur	1–1 (a.e.t.)	Queens Park Rangers
Hoddle 110'	(Report)	Fenwick 115'

Wembley, London
Attendance: 100,000
Referee: Clive White (Middlesex)

Tottenham	QPR

GK	1	(England) Ray Clemence
LB	2	(Republic of Ireland) Chris Hughton
CB	3	(England) Paul Miller
CB	4	(Wales) Paul Price
RM	5	(England) Micky Hazard (substituted off) 104'
RB	6	(England) Steve Perryman (c)
CM	7	(England) Graham Roberts
CF	8	(Scotland) Steve Archibald
LM	9	(Republic of Ireland) Tony Galvin
CM	10	(England) Glenn Hoddle
CF	11	(England) Garth Crooks
Substitute:
MF	12	(England) Garry Brooke (substituted on) 104'
Manager:
(England) Keith Burkinshaw

GK	1	(England) Peter Hucker
RB	2	(England) Terry Fenwick
LB	3	(England) Ian Gillard
CM	4	(Republic of Ireland) Gary Waddock
CB	5	(England) Bob Hazell
CB	6	(England) Glenn Roeder (c)
LM	7	(England) Tony Currie
CM	8	(England) Mike Flanagan
CF	9	(England) Clive Allen (substituted off) 50'
CF	10	(England) Simon Stainrod
RM	11	(England) John Gregory
Substitute:
MF	12	(England) Gary Micklewhite (substituted on) 50'
Manager:
(England) Terry Venables

Match rules

- 90 minutes.
- 30 minutes of extra-time if necessary.
- Replay if scores still level.
- One substitute.

== Replay ==
27 May 1982

Tottenham Hotspur	1–0	Queens Park Rangers
Hoddle 6' (pen.)

Wembley, London
Attendance: 90,000
Referee: Clive White (Middlesex)

Tottenham	QPR

GK	1	(England) Ray Clemence
LB	2	(Republic of Ireland) Chris Hughton
CB	3	(England) Paul Miller
CB	4	(Wales) Paul Price
RM	5	(England) Micky Hazard (substituted off) 67'
RB	6	(England) Steve Perryman (c)
CM	7	(England) Graham Roberts
CF	8	(Scotland) Steve Archibald
LM	9	(Republic of Ireland) Tony Galvin
CM	10	(England) Glenn Hoddle
CF	11	(England) Garth Crooks
Substitute:
CM	12	(England) Garry Brooke (substituted on) 67'
Manager:
(England) Keith Burkinshaw

GK	1	(England) Peter Hucker
CB	2	(England) Terry Fenwick
LB	3	(England) Ian Gillard
CM	4	(Republic of Ireland) Gary Waddock
CB	5	(England) Bob Hazell
RB	6	(England) Warren Neill
CM	7	(England) Tony Currie (c)
LM	8	(England) Mike Flanagan
CF	9	(England) Gary Micklewhite (substituted off) 84'
CF	10	(England) Simon Stainrod
RM	11	(England) John Gregory
Substitute:
MF	12	(England) Steve Burke (substituted on) 84'
Manager:
(England) Terry Venables

Match rules

- 90 minutes.
- 30 minutes of extra-time if necessary.
- Penalty shoot-out if scores still level.
- One substitute.

== Cup final song ==
Tottenham's cup final song was "Tottenham, Tottenham", recorded by the musical duo Chas and Dave with the Tottenham squad.
