= 1981–82 Football League Cup =

Milk Cup, League Cup
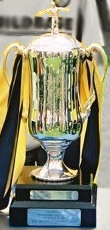
- The Milk Cup

Tournament details
- Country: England; Wales
- Teams: 92

Final positions
- Champions: Liverpool (2nd title)
- Runners-up: Tottenham Hotspur

Tournament statistics
- Top goal scorer: Ian Rush (8 goals)

The 1981–82 Football League Cup (known as the Milk Cup for sponsorship reasons) was the 22nd season of the Football League Cup, a knockout competition for England's top 92 football clubs. The competition started on 31 August 1981 and ended with the final on 13 March 1982.

The final was contested by First Division teams Tottenham Hotspur and Liverpool at Wembley Stadium in London.

== First round ==
=== First leg ===
Home team	Score	Away team	Date
Aldershot	0–0	Wimbledon	1 September 1981
Bolton Wanderers	2–1	Oldham Athletic	1 September 1981
Bournemouth	0–1	Fulham	1 September 1981
Bradford City	3–1	Blackpool	2 September 1981
Bristol City	2–0	Walsall	1 September 1981
Bury	3–3	Carlisle United	1 September 1981
Cardiff City	2–1	Exeter City	2 September 1981
Chester	1–1	Plymouth Argyle	8 September 1981
Colchester United	2–0	Gillingham	1 September 1981
Crewe Alexandra	1–1	Bristol Rovers	2 September 1981
Darlington	1–3	Rotherham United	1 September 1981
Doncaster Rovers	0–0	Chesterfield	1 September 1981
Halifax Town	1–2	Preston North End	1 September 1981
Hereford United	1–1	Port Vale	2 September 1981
Huddersfield Town	3–1	Rochdale	1 September 1981
Leyton Orient	1–1	Millwall	1 September 1981
Lincoln City	3–0	Hull City	2 September 1981
Northampton Town	2–0	Hartlepool United	1 September 1981
Oxford United	1–0	Brentford	2 September 1981
Peterborough United	2–3	Barnsley	2 September 1981
Reading	2–2	Charlton Athletic	2 September 1981
Scunthorpe United	0–0	Mansfield Town	1 September 1981
Sheffield United	1–0	York City	1 September 1981
Southend United	0–0	Portsmouth	2 September 1981
Torquay United	2–3	Newport County	2 September 1981
Tranmere Rovers	4–2	Burnley	1 September 1981
Wigan Athletic	3–0	Stockport County	31 August 1981
Wrexham	3–2	Swindon Town	1 September 1981

- The first match between Chester and Plymouth Argyle on the 2nd of September 1981 was abandoned after 78 minutes due to a broken goalpost.

=== Second leg ===
Home team	Score	Away team	Date	Agg
Barnsley	6–0	Peterborough United	15 September 1981	9–2
Blackpool	0–0	Bradford City	16 September 1981	1–3
Brentford	0–2	Oxford United	15 September 1981	0–3
Bristol Rovers	1–0	Crewe Alexandra	15 September 1981	2–1
Burnley	3–3	Tranmere Rovers	15 September 1981	5–7
Carlisle United	2–1	Bury	15 September 1981	5–4
Charlton Athletic	3–1	Reading	15 September 1981	5–3
Chesterfield	1–1	Doncaster Rovers	15 September 1981	1–1
Exeter City	3–1	Cardiff City	16 September 1981	4–3
Fulham	2–0	Bournemouth	15 September 1981	3–0
Gillingham	1–1	Colchester United	15 September 1981	1–3
Hartlepool United	2–1	Northampton Town	16 September 1981	2–3
Hull City	1–1	Lincoln City	15 September 1981	1–4
Mansfield Town	2–0	Scunthorpe United	14 September 1981	2–0
Millwall	3–2	Leyton Orient	16 September 1981	4–3
Newport County	0–0	Torquay United	15 September 1981	3–2
Oldham Athletic	4–2	Bolton Wanderers	15 September 1981	5–4
Plymouth Argyle	1–0	Chester	15 September 1981	2–1
Port Vale	2–0	Hereford United	14 September 1981	3–1
Portsmouth	4–1	Southend United	16 September 1981	4–1
Preston North End	0–0	Halifax Town	15 September 1981	2–1
Rochdale	2–4	Huddersfield Town	15 September 1981	3–7
Rotherham United	2–1	Darlington	15 September 1981	5–2
Stockport County	1–2	Wigan Athletic	14 September 1981	1–5
Swindon Town	0–2	Wrexham	15 September 1981	2–5
Walsall	1–0	Bristol City	15 September 1981	1–2
Wimbledon	1–3	Aldershot	15 September 1981	1–3
York City	1–1	Sheffield United	15 September 1981	1–2

== Second round ==
=== First leg ===
Home team	Score	Away team	Date
Aldershot	2–2	Wigan Athletic	6 October 1981
Aston Villa	3–2	Wolverhampton Wanderers	7 October 1981
Barnsley	2–0	Swansea City	6 October 1981
Birmingham City	2–3	Nottingham Forest	6 October 1981
Blackburn Rovers	1–1	Sheffield Wednesday	7 October 1981
Bradford City	3–4	Mansfield Town	7 October 1981
Bristol Rovers	1–2	Northampton Town	6 October 1981
Carlisle United	0–0	Bristol City	6 October 1981
Colchester United	3–1	Cambridge United	6 October 1981
Derby County	2–3	West Ham United	7 October 1981
Doncaster Rovers	1–0	Crystal Palace	6 October 1981
Everton	1–1	Coventry City	6 October 1981
Grimsby Town	1–0	Watford	6 October 1981
Huddersfield Town	1–0	Brighton & Hove Albion	6 October 1981
Leeds United	0–1	Ipswich Town	7 October 1981
Lincoln City	1–1	Notts County	7 October 1981
Liverpool	5–0	Exeter City	7 October 1981
Luton Town	0–2	Wrexham	6 October 1981
Manchester City	2–0	Stoke City	7 October 1981
Middlesbrough	2–1	Plymouth Argyle	6 October 1981
Millwall	3–3	Oxford United	6 October 1981
Newcastle United	1–2	Fulham	7 October 1981
Norwich City	1–0	Charlton Athletic	7 October 1981
Oldham Athletic	1–0	Newport County	6 October 1981
Preston North End	1–0	Leicester City	6 October 1981
Queens Park Rangers	5–0	Portsmouth	6 October 1981
Sheffield United	1–0	Arsenal	6 October 1981
Shrewsbury Town	3–3	West Bromwich Albion	6 October 1981
Southampton	1–1	Chelsea	6 October 1981
Sunderland	2–0	Rotherham United	7 October 1981
Tottenham Hotspur	1–0	Manchester United	7 October 1981
Tranmere Rovers	2–0	Port Vale	5 October 1981

=== Second leg ===
Home team	Score	Away team	Date	Agg
Arsenal	2–0	Sheffield United	27 October 1981	2–1
Brighton & Hove Albion	2–0	Huddersfield Town	27 October 1981	2–1
Bristol City	2–1	Carlisle United	27 October 1981	2–1
Cambridge United	3–2	Colchester United	27 October 1981	4–5
Charlton Athletic	0–1	Norwich City	28 October 1981	0–2
Chelsea	2–1	Southampton	28 October 1981	3–2
Coventry City	0–1	Everton	27 October 1981	1–2
Crystal Palace	2–0	Doncaster Rovers	27 October 1981	2–1
Exeter City	0–6	Liverpool	28 October 1981	0–11
Fulham	2–0	Newcastle United	27 October 1981	4–1
Ipswich Town	3–0	Leeds United	27 October 1981	4–0
Leicester City	4–0	Preston North End	28 October 1981	4–1
Manchester United	0–1	Tottenham Hotspur	28 October 1981	0–2
Mansfield Town	0–2	Bradford City	26 October 1981	4–5
Newport County	0–0	Oldham Athletic	27 October 1981	0–1
Northampton Town	3–1	Bristol Rovers	27 October 1981	5–2
Nottingham Forest	2–1	Birmingham City	28 October 1981	5–3
Notts County	2–3	Lincoln City	27 October 1981	3–4
Oxford United	1–0	Millwall	28 October 1981	4–3
Plymouth Argyle	0–0	Middlesbrough	27 October 1981	1–2
Port Vale	1–2	Tranmere Rovers	28 October 1981	1–4
Portsmouth	2–2	Queens Park Rangers	27 October 1981	2–7
Rotherham United	3–3	Sunderland	27 October 1981	3–5
Sheffield Wednesday	1–2	Blackburn Rovers	27 October 1981	2–3
Stoke City	2–0	Manchester City	28 October 1981	2–2
Swansea City	3–2	Barnsley	27 October 1981	3–4
Watford	3–1	Grimsby Town	27 October 1981	3–2
West Bromwich Albion	2–1	Shrewsbury Town	28 October 1981	5–4
West Ham United	2–0	Derby County	27 October 1981	5–2
Wigan Athletic	1–0	Aldershot	27 October 1981	3–2
Wolverhampton Wanderers	1–2	Aston Villa	27 October 1981	3–5
Wrexham	0–1	Luton Town	27 October 1981	2–1

== Third round ==
=== Ties ===
Home team	Score	Away team	Date
Arsenal	1–0	Norwich City	10 November 1981
Barnsley	4–1	Brighton & Hove Albion	10 November 1981
Blackburn Rovers	0–1	Nottingham Forest	11 November 1981
Everton	1–0	Oxford United	11 November 1981
Ipswich Town	1–1	Bradford City	10 November 1981
Leicester City	0–0	Aston Villa	11 November 1981
Liverpool	4–1	Middlesbrough	10 November 1981
Manchester City	3–1	Northampton Town	11 November 1981
Oldham Athletic	1–1	Fulham	10 November 1981
Queens Park Rangers	3–0	Bristol City	10 November 1981
Sunderland	0–1	Crystal Palace	11 November 1981
Tottenham Hotspur	2–0	Wrexham	11 November 1981
Tranmere Rovers	1–0	Colchester United	10 November 1981
Watford	2–2	Lincoln City	10 November 1981
West Ham United	2–2	West Bromwich Albion	10 November 1981
Wigan Athletic	4–2	Chelsea	11 November 1981

=== Replays ===
Home team	Score	Away team	Date
Aston Villa	2–0	Leicester City	25 November 1981
Bradford City	2–3	Ipswich Town	2 December 1981
Fulham	3–0	Oldham Athletic	17 November 1981
Lincoln City	2–3	Watford	25 November 1981
West Bromwich Albion	1–1	West Ham United	24 November 1981

=== 2nd Replay ===
Home team	Score	Away team	Date
West Ham United	0–1	West Bromwich Albion	1 December 1981

== Fourth round ==
=== Ties ===
Home team	Score	Away team	Date
Arsenal	0–0	Liverpool	1 December 1981
Barnsley	1–0	Manchester City	2 December 1981
Crystal Palace	1–3	West Bromwich Albion	15 December 1981
Everton	2–3	Ipswich Town	15 December 1981
Nottingham Forest	2–0	Tranmere Rovers	2 December 1981
Tottenham Hotspur	1–0	Fulham	2 December 1981
Watford	4–1	Queens Park Rangers	1 December 1981
Wigan Athletic	1–2	Aston Villa	1 December 1981

=== Replay ===
Home team	Score	Away team	Date
Liverpool	3–0	Arsenal	8 December 1981

== Fifth Round ==
=== Ties ===
Home team	Score	Away team	Date
Aston Villa	0–1	West Bromwich Albion	19 January 1982
Ipswich Town	2–1	Watford	18 January 1982
Liverpool	0–0	Barnsley	12 January 1982
Tottenham Hotspur	1–0	Nottingham Forest	18 January 1982

=== Replay ===
Home team	Score	Away team	Date
Barnsley	1–3	Liverpool	19 January 1982

== Semi-finals ==
Holders Liverpool defeated Ipswich Town – who were also competing with them for the league title – over the two legs to reach the final. Fellow title contenders Tottenham Hotspur won the other semi-final against relegation threatened West Bromwich Albion.

=== First leg ===
Home team	Score	Away team	Date
Ipswich Town	0–2	Liverpool	2 February 1982
West Bromwich Albion	0–0	Tottenham Hotspur	3 February 1982

=== Second leg ===
Home team	Score	Away team	Date	Agg
Liverpool	2–2	Ipswich Town	9 February 1982	4–2
Tottenham Hotspur	1–0	West Bromwich Albion	10 February 1982	1–0

== Final ==
13 March 1982
15:00 GMT

Liverpool	3–1 (a.e.t.)	Tottenham Hotspur
Whelan 87', 111'; Rush 119'	Report	Archibald 11'

Wembley Stadium, London
Referee: Peter Willis (County Durham)
