= 1981–82 FA Cup =

Tournament details
- Country: England; Wales

Final positions
- Champions: Tottenham Hotspur (7th title)
- Runners-up: Queens Park Rangers

Tournament statistics
- Top goal scorer: Clive Allen (7 goals)

The 1981–82 FA Cup was the 101st season of the world's oldest football knockout competition, the Football Association Challenge Cup, or FA Cup for short.

The competition culminated with the FA Cup Final, held at Wembley Stadium, London on 22 May 1982. The match was contested by two London clubs, Tottenham Hotspur and Queens Park Rangers, with Tottenham retaining the trophy with a 1–0 victory in a replay after a 1–1 draw in the first game.

== Qualifying rounds ==
Most participating clubs that were not members of the Football League competed in the qualifying rounds to secure one of 28 places available in the first round.

The winners from the fourth qualifying round were Blyth Spartans, Horden Colliery Welfare, Bishop Auckland, Workington, Penrith, Runcorn, Mossley, Nuneaton Borough, Stafford Rangers, Kettering Town, Willenhall Town, Harlow Town, Boston United, Wycombe Wanderers, Hendon, Bedford Town, Dagenham, Barnet, Dover, Barking, Hastings United, Leytonstone & Ilford, Weymouth, Bideford, Minehead, Taunton Town, Dorchester Town and Yeovil Town.

Penrith and Willenhall Town were the only qualifying clubs appearing in the competition proper for the first time. Of the others, Hastings United had not featured at this stage since 1960–61, Dorchester Town since 1959-60, Horden Colliery Welfare since 1954-55 and Taunton Town since a predecessor club of the same name had successfully navigated the qualifying rounds in 1930-31.

== First round proper ==
The 48 teams from the Football League Third and Fourth Divisions entered in this round along with the 28 non-league clubs from the qualifying rounds and Altrincham, Bishop's Stortford, Sutton United and Enfield who were given byes. This round included six clubs from various competitions at Step 8 of the English football system: Blyth Spartans, Horden Colliery Welfare, Bishop Auckland and Penrith from the Northern League, Bideford from the Western League and Willenhall Town from the West Midlands (Regional) League.

The initial matches were played over the weekend of 20–21 November 1981 with replays mainly staged on 23–25 November.

Tie no	Home team	Score	Away team	Date
1	Enfield (5)	2–0	Hastings United (6)	21 November 1981
2	Chesterfield	4–1	Preston North End	21 November 1981
3	Darlington	2–2	Carlisle United	21 November 1981
Replay	Carlisle United	3–1	Darlington	24 November 1981
4	AFC Bournemouth	1–0	Reading	21 November 1981
5	Bristol City	0–0	Torquay United	20 November 1981
Replay	Torquay United	1–2	Bristol City	25 November 1981
6	Burnley	0–0	Runcorn (5)	21 November 1981
Replay	Runcorn	1–2	Burnley	24 November 1981
7	Dorchester Town (6)	3–3	Minehead (6)	21 November 1981
Replay	Minehead	0–4	Dorchester Town	23 November 1981
8	Rochdale	2–2	Hull City	21 November 1981
Replay	Hull City	2–2	Rochdale	24 November 1981
Replay	Hull City	1–0	Rochdale	30 November 1981
9	Weymouth (5)	0–0	Northampton Town	21 November 1981
Replay	Northampton Town	6–2	Weymouth	24 November 1981
10	Lincoln City	2–2	Port Vale	21 November 1981
Replay	Port Vale	0–0	Lincoln City	30 November 1981
Replay	Port Vale	2–0	Lincoln City	2 December 1981
11	Stafford Rangers (5)	1–2	York City	21 November 1981
12	Swindon Town	2–1	Taunton Town (6)	21 November 1981
13	Sheffield United	2–2	Altrincham (5)	21 November 1981
Replay	Altrincham	3–0	Sheffield United	23 November 1981
14	Bishop Auckland (8)	4–1	Nuneaton Borough (6)	21 November 1981
15	Tranmere Rovers	1–1	Bury	21 November 1981
Replay	Bury	3–1	Tranmere Rovers	24 November 1981
16	Stockport County	3–1	Mossley (6)	21 November 1981
17	Dover (6)	0–2	Oxford United	21 November 1981
18	Brentford	2–0	Exeter City	21 November 1981
19	Bristol Rovers	1–2	Fulham	21 November 1981
20	Portsmouth	1–1	Millwall	21 November 1981
Replay	Millwall	3–2	Portsmouth	25 November 1981
21	Plymouth Argyle	0–0	Gillingham	21 November 1981
Replay	Gillingham	1–0	Plymouth Argyle	24 November 1981
22	Penrith (8)	1–0	Chester	21 November 1981
23	Scunthorpe United	1–0	Bradford City	21 November 1981
24	Blyth Spartans (8)	1–2	Walsall	21 November 1981
25	Bedford Town (6)	0–2	Wimbledon	21 November 1981
26	Mansfield Town	0–1	Doncaster Rovers	21 November 1981
27	Halifax Town	0–3	Peterborough United	21 November 1981
28	Workington (6)	1–1	Huddersfield Town	21 November 1981
Replay	Huddersfield Town	5–0	Workington	24 November 1981
29	Hereford United	3–1	Southend United	21 November 1981
30	Bishop's Stortford (6)	2–2	Sutton United (6)	21 November 1981
Replay	Sutton United	2–1	Bishop's Stortford	24 November 1981
31	Bideford (8)	1–2	Barking (6)	21 November 1981
32	Aldershot	2–0	Leytonstone & Ilford (6)	21 November 1981
33	Horden CW (8)	0–1	Blackpool	21 November 1981
34	Wigan Athletic	2–2	Hartlepool United	21 November 1981
Replay	Hartlepool United	1–0	Wigan Athletic	25 November 1981
35	Boston United (5)	0–1	Kettering Town (5)	21 November 1981
36	Harlow Town (6)	0–0	Barnet (5)	21 November 1981
Replay	Barnet	1–0	Harlow Town	24 November 1981
37	Colchester United	2–0	Newport County	21 November 1981
38	Hendon (6)	1–1	Wycombe Wanderers (6)	21 November 1981
Replay	Wycombe Wanderers	2–0	Hendon	24 November 1981
39	Dagenham (5)	2–2	Yeovil Town (5)	21 November 1981
Replay	Yeovil Town	0–1	Dagenham	25 November 1981
40	Willenhall Town (8)	0–1	Crewe Alexandra	21 November 1981

== Second round proper ==
The Second Round was intended to be played on 12 December 1981, although many were not played until 15 December or even 2 January or 9 January. Replays were played on various dates after these games. Step 8 clubs Bishop Auckland and Penrith were the lowest-ranked teams in the round.

Tie no	Home team	Score	Away team	Date
1	Enfield (5)	4–1	Wimbledon	15 December 1981
2	Chesterfield	0–1	Huddersfield Town	12 December 1981
3	Barnet (5)	2–0	Wycombe Wanderers (6)	15 December 1981
4	Bristol City	3–0	Northampton Town	15 December 1981
5	Bury	1–1	Burnley	2 January 1982
Replay	Burnley	2–1	Bury	4 January 1982
6	Dorchester Town (6)	1–1	AFC Bournemouth	12 December 1981
Replay	AFC Bournemouth	2–1	Dorchester Town	15 December 1981
7	Gillingham	1–1	Barking (6)	15 December 1981
Replay	Gillingham	3–1	Barking	2 January 1982
8	Crewe Alexandra	1–3	Scunthorpe United	2 January 1982
9	Swindon Town	2–1	Sutton United (6)	15 December 1981
10	Doncaster Rovers	3–0	Penrith (8)	12 December 1981
11	Brentford	1–1	Colchester United	16 December 1981
Replay	Colchester United	1–0	Brentford	30 December 1981
12	Hull City	2–0	Hartlepool United	4 January 1982
13	Carlisle United	1–0	Bishop Auckland (8)	9 January 1982
14	Port Vale	4–1	Stockport County	2 January 1982
15	York City	0–0	Altrincham (5)	12 December 1981
Replay	Altrincham	4–3	York City	2 January 1982
16	Hereford United	1–0	Fulham	2 January 1982
17	Kettering Town (5)	0–3	Blackpool	2 January 1982
18	Aldershot	2–2	Oxford United	15 December 1981
Replay	Oxford United	4–2	Aldershot	30 December 1981
19	Peterborough United	2–1	Walsall	2 January 1982
20	Dagenham (5)	1–2	Millwall	30 December 1981

== Third round proper ==
Teams from the Football League First and Second Division entered in this round. The Third Round was intended to be played on 2 January 1982. However, some matches were played initially over the period 4–6 January, while others took place as late as 23 January. Most replays took place over 18–21 January. Enfield, Barnet and Altrincham from the Alliance Premier League at Step 5 of the English football system were the lowest-ranked teams in the round and the last non-league clubs left in the competition.

Tie no	Home team	Score	Away team	Date
1	Enfield (5)	2–3	Crystal Palace (2)	2 January 1982
2	AFC Bournemouth (4)	0–2	Oxford United (3)	2 January 1982
3	Barnet (5)	0–0	Brighton & Hove Albion (1)	2 January 1982
Replay	Brighton & Hove Albion	3–1	Barnet	5 January 1982
4	Burnley (3)	6–1	Altrincham (5)	18 January 1982
5	Watford (2)	1–0	Manchester United (1)	2 January 1982
6	Gillingham (3)	2–1	Oldham Athletic (2)	5 January 1982
7	Leicester City (2)	3–1	Southampton (1)	2 January 1982
8	Notts County (1)	0–6	Aston Villa (1)	5 January 1982
9	Nottingham Forest (1)	1–3	Wrexham (2)	2 January 1982
10	Bolton Wanderers (2)	3–1	Derby County (2)	2 January 1982
11	Wolverhampton Wanderers (1)	1–3	Leeds United (1)	2 January 1982
12	West Bromwich Albion (1)	3–2	Blackburn Rovers (2)	2 January 1982
13	Luton Town (2)	2–1	Swindon Town (3)	2 January 1982
14	Shrewsbury Town (2)	1–0	Port Vale (4)	5 January 1982
15	Doncaster Rovers (3)	2–1	Cambridge United (2)	2 January 1982
16	Newcastle United (2)	1–1	Colchester United (4)	4 January 1982
Replay	Colchester United	3–4	Newcastle United	18 January 1982
17	Tottenham Hotspur (1)	1–0	Arsenal (1)	2 January 1982
18	Manchester City (1)	3–1	Cardiff City (2)	2 January 1982
19	Queens Park Rangers (2)	1–1	Middlesbrough (1)	2 January 1982
Replay	Middlesbrough	2–3	Queens Park Rangers	18 January 1982
20	Barnsley (2)	0–2	Blackpool (4)	5 January 1982
21	Coventry City (1)	3–1	Sheffield Wednesday (2)	2 January 1982
22	West Ham United (1)	2–1	Everton (1)	2 January 1982
23	Millwall (3)	1–6	Grimsby Town (2)	5 January 1982
24	Carlisle United (3)	2–3	Huddersfield Town (3)	23 January 1982
25	Chelsea (2)	0–0	Hull City (4)	18 January 1982
Replay	Hull City	0–2	Chelsea	21 January 1982
26	Scunthorpe United (4)	1–1	Hereford United (4)	6 January 1982
Replay	Hereford United	4–1	Scunthorpe United	20 January 1982
27	Stoke City (1)	0–1	Norwich City (2)	2 January 1982
28	Rotherham United (2)	1–1	Sunderland (1)	2 January 1982
Replay	Sunderland	1–0	Rotherham United	18 January 1982
29	Peterborough United (4)	0–1	Bristol City (3)	6 January 1982
30	Birmingham City (1)	2–3	Ipswich Town (1)	2 January 1982
31	Orient (2)	1–0	Charlton Athletic (2)	2 January 1982
32	Swansea City (1)	0–4	Liverpool (1)	2 January 1982

== Fourth round proper ==
The Fourth Round was mainly played on 23 January 1982. Matches were played or replayed either on 26 January, or on 1 February. Fourth Division sides Blackpool and Hereford United were the lowest-ranked teams in the round.

Tie no	Home team	Score	Away team	Date
1	Blackpool	0–0	Queens Park Rangers	23 January 1982
Replay	Queens Park Rangers	5–1	Blackpool	26 January 1982
2	Bristol City	0–1	Aston Villa	23 January 1982
3	Watford	2–0	West Ham United	23 January 1982
4	Gillingham	0–1	West Bromwich Albion	23 January 1982
5	Sunderland	0–3	Liverpool	23 January 1982
6	Luton Town	0–3	Ipswich Town	23 January 1982
7	Shrewsbury Town	1–0	Burnley	23 January 1982
8	Newcastle United	1–2	Grimsby Town	23 January 1982
9	Tottenham Hotspur	1–0	Leeds United	23 January 1982
10	Manchester City	1–3	Coventry City	23 January 1982
11	Brighton & Hove Albion	0–3	Oxford United	23 January 1982
12	Norwich City	2–1	Doncaster Rovers	23 January 1982
13	Crystal Palace	1–0	Bolton Wanderers	23 January 1982
14	Chelsea	0–0	Wrexham	23 January 1982
Replay	Wrexham	1–1	Chelsea	26 January 1982
Replay	Wrexham	1–2	Chelsea	1 February 1982
15	Huddersfield Town	1–1	Orient	26 January 1982
Replay	Orient	2–0	Huddersfield Town	1 February 1982
16	Hereford United	0–1	Leicester City	23 January 1982

== Fifth round proper ==
The Fifth Round matches were all played on 13 February 1982. The only replay was played on 16 February. Third Division side Oxford United was the lowest-ranked team in the round and was the last club from the First Round left in the competition.

Tie no	Home team	Score	Away team	Date
1	Leicester City	2–0	Watford	13 February 1982
2	West Bromwich Albion	1–0	Norwich City	13 February 1982
3	Shrewsbury Town	2–1	Ipswich Town	13 February 1982
4	Tottenham Hotspur	1–0	Aston Villa	13 February 1982
5	Queens Park Rangers	3–1	Grimsby Town	13 February 1982
6	Coventry City	4–0	Oxford United	13 February 1982
7	Crystal Palace	0–0	Orient	13 February 1982
Replay	Orient	0–1	Crystal Palace	16 February 1982
8	Chelsea	2–0	Liverpool	13 February 1982

== Sixth round proper ==
The sixth-round games were played on 6 March 1982. There were no replays.

Tie no	Home team	Score	Away team	Date
1	Leicester City	5–2	Shrewsbury Town	6 March 1982
2	West Bromwich Albion	2–0	Coventry City	6 March 1982
3	Queens Park Rangers	1–0	Crystal Palace	6 March 1982
4	Chelsea	2–3	Tottenham Hotspur	6 March 1982

== Semi-finals ==
The matches were both played on 3 April 1982. Tottenham and Queens Park Rangers were victorious and reached the FA Cup Final.

3 April 1982
15:00

Tottenham Hotspur	2–0	Leicester City
Crooks 56'; Wilson 76' (o.g.)

Villa Park, Birmingham

Referee:- Neil Midgley (Salford)

3 April 1982
15:00

Queens Park Rangers	1–0	West Bromwich Albion
Allen

Highbury Stadium, London

Referee:- Keith Hackett (Sheffield)

== Final ==
The final was held at Wembley Stadium on 22 May 1982. The replay was held on 27 May 1982.

22 May 1982
15:00 BST

Tottenham Hotspur	1–1 (a.e.t.)	Queens Park Rangers
Hoddle 110'		Fenwick 115'

Wembley, London
Attendance: 100,000
Referee: C. White

Tottenham	QPR

=== Replay ===
27 May 1982
19:45 BST

Tottenham Hotspur	1–0	Queens Park Rangers
Hoddle 6' (pen.)

Wembley, London
Attendance: 90,000
Referee: C. White

Tottenham	QPR

== Television coverage ==
The right to show FA Cup games were, as with Football League matches, shared between the BBC and ITV network. All games were shown in a highlights format, except the Final, which was shown live both on BBC1 & ITV. The BBC football highlights programme Match of the Day would show up to three games and the various ITV regional network stations would cover up to one game and show highlights from other games covered elsewhere on the ITV network. No games from the first or second round were covered. Highlights of replays would be shown on either the BBC or ITV.

This season BBC Match Of The Day highlights were back on Saturday nights while the ITV regional highlights programmes were back on Sunday afternoons in the third season of the four-year alternation deal.

- Third Round BBC Leicester City v Southampton, Barnet v Brighton & Hove Albion, Swansea City v Liverpool ITV Tottenham Hotspur v Arsenal (LWT), Watford v Manchester United (Granada out of region, although used TVS cameras and commentator Gerald Sinstadt), Birmingham City v Ipswich Town (Central & Anglia), Rotherham United v Sunderland (Yorkshire & Tyne-Tees), Brighton & Hove Albion v Barnet (Midweek replay all regions), Notts County v Aston Villa (Midweek all regions)
- Fourth Round BBC Watford v West Ham United, Tottenham Hotspur v Leeds United, Manchester City v Coventry City (Midweek Replays not televised due to both being on the Tuesday Night) ITV Luton Town v Ipswich Town (Anglia & LWT), Gillingham v West Bromwich Albion (TVS & Central), Sunderland v Liverpool (Tyne-Tees & Yorkshire), Blackpool v Queens Park Rangers (Granada). While Huddersfield v Orient (planned for Yorkshire and LWT) was postponed due to the delayed R3 tie Carlisle v Huddersfield having to be played on R4 day
- Fifth Round BBC Tottenham Hotspur v Aston Villa, Leicester City v Watford, West Bromwich Albion v Norwich City ITV Chelsea v Liverpool (LWT), Shrewsbury Town v Ipswich Town (Anglia out of region, although used Granada's cameras and commentator Martin Tyler), Coventry City v Oxford United (Central, also showed the Shrewsbury game) (Midweek Replay all regions) Orient v Crystal Palace (All Regions)
- Sixth Round BBC Chelsea v Tottenham Hotspur, Leicester City v Shrewsbury Town ITV QPR v Crystal Palace (LWT), West Bromwich Albion v Coventry City (Central) (All regions showed these games)
- Semifinals BBC Queens Park Rangers v West Bromwich Albion ITV Leicester City v Tottenham Hotspur (All regions showed this game)
- Final Queens Park Rangers v Tottenham Hotspur (Both BBC and ITV showed the Final live. BBC and all ITV regions apart from Yorkshire showed the replay)
