= 1980–81 Manchester City F.C. season =

English football club season

Manchester City
1980–81 season
- Manager: Malcolm Allison (to 8 Oct 1980); Tony Book (caretaker); John Bond (from 17 Oct 1980)
- Stadium: Maine Road
- First Division: 12th
- FA Cup: Runners-up
- League Cup: Semi-finals
- Top goalscorer: League: Kevin Reeves (12); All: Kevin Reeves (17)
- Highest home attendance: 52,532 vs Everton; 11 March 1981
- Lowest home attendance: 21,356 vs Stoke City; 3 September 1980
- Average home league attendance: 33,536 (3rd highest in league)

The 1980–81 season was Manchester City's 79th season of competitive football and 61st season in the top division of English football. In addition to the First Division, the club competed in the FA Cup and Football League Cup. The club reached the FA Cup Final, their first in 12 years and their eighth in total. Despite a spectacular volley by Steve MacKenzie, his goal was overshadowed by Ricky Villa's magnificent solo goal, which won Spurs the trophy. The club would not reach another FA Cup Final for another 30 years.

== First Division ==
=== League table ===
Pos	Team	Pld	W	D	L	GF	GA	GD	Pts	Qualification or relegation
10	Tottenham Hotspur	42	14	15	13	70	68	+2	43	Qualification for the European Cup Winners' Cup first round (Note: Tottenham Hotspur qualified for the European Cup Winners' Cup first round as the 1980–81 FA Cup winners.)
11	Stoke City	42	12	18	12	51	60	−9	42	
12	Manchester City	42	14	11	17	56	59	−3	39	
13	Birmingham City	42	13	12	17	50	61	−11	38	
14	Middlesbrough	42	16	5	21	53	61	−8	37	

Source: World Football
Rules for classification: 1) Points; 2) Goal difference; 3) Goals scored

=== Results summary ===
Overall								Home						Away					
Pld	W	D	L	GF	GA	GD	Pts	W	D	L	GF	GA	GD	W	D	L	GF	GA	GD
42	14	11	17	56	59	−3	39	10	7	4	35	25	+10	4	4	13	21	34	−13

=== Results ===
Date	Opponents	H / A	Venue	Result F – A	Scorers	Attendance
16 August 1980	Southampton	A	The Dell	0–2		23,320
20 August 1980	Sunderland	H	Maine Road	0–4		33,271
23 August 1980	Aston Villa	H	Maine Road	2–2	Tueart (pen), Ranson	30,017
30 August 1980	Middlesbrough	A	Ayresome Park	2–2	Reeves, MacKenzie	15,761
6 September 1980	Arsenal	H	Maine Road	1–1	Tueart	32.233
13 September 1980	Nottingham Forest	A	City Ground	2–3	Bennett, Henry	23,184
20 September 1980	Stoke City	H	Maine Road	1–2	Tueart	29,507
27 September 1980	Manchester United	A	Old Trafford	2–2	Reeves, Palmer	55,926
4 October 1980	Liverpool	H	Maine Road	0–3		41,022
8 October 1980	Leeds United	A	Elland Road	0–1		19,134
11 October 1980	West Bromwich Albion	A	The Hawthorns	1–3	Daley	19,515
18 October 1980	Birmingham City	H	Maine Road	0–1		30,041
22 October 1980	Tottenham Hotspur	H	Maine Road	3–1	Reeves, Daley, MacKenzie	28,788
25 October 1980	Brighton & Hove Albion	A	Goldstone Ground	2–1	Tueart (2)	18,368
1 November 1980	Norwich City	H	Maine Road	1–0	Power	33,056
8 November 1980	Leicester City	A	Filbert Street	1–1	Tueart	19,104
12 November 1980	Sunderland	A	Roker Park	0–2		23,387
15 November 1980	Southampton	H	Maine Road	3–0	Gow, Bennett, Reeves	32,661
22 November 1980	Coventry City	H	Maine Road	3–0	Reeves, Power, Bennett	30,047
29 November 1980	Crystal Palace	A	Selhurst Park	3–2	Reeves, Gow (2)	16,578
6 December 1980	Ipswich Town	H	Maine Road	1–1	Gow	35,215
13 December 1980	Tottenham Hotspur	A	White Hart Lane	1–2	Boyer	23,883
20 December 1980	Leeds United	H	Maine Road	1–0	Reeves	31,866
26 December 1980	Everton	A	Goodison Park	2–0	Gow, Power	36,194
27 December 1980	Wolverhampton Wanderers	H	Maine Road	4–0	Hutchinson (2), McDonald, Reeves	37,817
10 January 1981	Coventry City	A	Highfield Road	1–1	MacKenzie	18,348
17 January 1981	Middlesbrough	H	Maine Road	3–2	McDonald, Reeves, Hutchinson	30,774
31 January 1981	Aston Villa	A	Villa Park	0–1		33,682
7 February 1981	Nottingham Forest	H	Maine Road	1–1	Power	40,534
21 February 1981	Manchester United	H	Maine Road	1–0	MacKenzie	50,114
24 February 1981	Arsenal	A	Highbury	0–2		24,790
14 March 1981	West Bromwich Albion	H	Maine Road	2–1	McDonald, Tueart	36,581
18 March 1981	Stoke City	A	Victoria Ground	1–2	McDonald	15,842
21 March 1981	Birmingham City	A	St Andrews	0–2		16,160
28 March 1981	Brighton & Hove Albion	H	Maine Road	1–1	MacKenzie	30,122
31 March 1981	Leicester City	H	Maine Road	3–3	Reeves (2), Palmer	26,141
4 April 1981	Norwich City	A	Carrow Road	0–2		17,957
18 April 1981	Wolverhampton Wanderers	A	Molineux Stadium	3–1	Power	34,923
20 April 1981	Everton	H	Maine Road	3–1	Reeves, Reeves, MacKenzie	34,434
25 April 1981	Ipswich Town	A	Portman Road	0–1		22,684
2 May 1981	Crystal Palace	H	Maine Road	1–1	Bennett	30,017
19 May 1981	Liverpool	A	Anfield	0–1		24,462

== FA Cup ==
3 January 1981 Third round	Manchester City	4–0	Crystal Palace	Manchester
	Reeves 54' (pen.), 89'; Power 59'; Boyer 81'			Stadium: Maine Road; Attendance: 39,347; Referee: Keith Hackett

24 January 1981 Fourth round	Manchester City	6–0	Norwich City	Manchester
	Reeves 16'; Gow 25'; MacKenzie 74'; Bennett 79'; Power 82'; McDonald 90'			Stadium: Maine Road; Attendance: 38,919; Referee: R Toseland

14 February 1981 Fifth Round	Peterborough United	0–1	Manchester City	Peterborough
			Booth 42'	Stadium: London Road Stadium; Attendance: 27,780; Referee: R Lewis

7 March 1981 Quarter Final	Everton	2–2	Manchester City	Liverpool
	Eastoe 42'; Ross 48', pen'		Gow 45'; Power 84'	Stadium: Goodison Park; Attendance: 52,791; Referee: Peter Willis

11 March 1981 Quarter Final replay	Manchester City	3–1	Everton	Manchester
	McDonald 65', 67'; Power 85'		Eastoe 69'	Stadium: Maine Road; Attendance: 52,532; Referee: Peter Willis

=== Semi Final ===
11 April 1981 Semi Final	Manchester City	1–0	Ipswich Town	Birmingham
	Power 100'			Stadium: Villa Park; Attendance: 46,537; Referee: Pat Partridge

=== Final ===
9 May 1981 Final	Manchester City	1–1	Tottenham Hotspur	Wembley
	Hutchison 30'		Hutchison 79' (own goal)	Stadium: Wembley Stadium; Attendance: 100,000; Referee: Keith Hackett

14 May 1981 Final replay	Tottenham Hotspur	3–2	Manchester City	Wembley
	Villa 7', 77'; Crooks 70'		Mackenzie 10'; Reeves 49' (pen.)	Stadium: Wembley Stadium; Attendance: 92,000; Referee: Keith Hackett

== League Cup ==
=== Results ===
Date	Round	Opponents	H / A	Venue	Result F – A	Scorers	Attendance
27 August 1980	2nd Round 1st Leg	Stoke City	A	Victoria Ground	1–1	Henry	13,176
3 September 1980	2nd Round 2nd Leg	Stoke City	H	Maine Road	3–0	Henry, Bennett (2)	21,356
23 September 1980	3rd Round	Luton Town	A	Kenilworth Road	2–1	Bennett, Henry	10,030
29 October 1980	4th Round	Notts County	H	Maine Road	5–1	Bennett, Tueart (4)	26,383
3 December 1980	Quarter Final	West Bromwich Albion	H	Maine Road	2–1	Bennett, Henry	35,611
14 January 1981	Semi Final 1st leg	Liverpool	H	Maine Road	0–1		48,045
10 February 1981	Semi Final 2nd leg	Liverpool	A	Anfield	1–1	Reeves	46,711
