= 1979–80 Manchester City F.C. season =

English football club season

Manchester City
1979–80 season
- Manager: Malcolm Allison
- Stadium: Maine Road
- First Division: 17th
- FA Cup: Third Round
- Football League Cup: Third Round
- Top goalscorer: League: Mick Robinson (8); All: Mick Robinson (9)
- Highest home attendance: 50,067 vs Manchester United; 10 November 1979
- Lowest home attendance: 29,384 vs Middlesbrough; 10 October 1979
- Average home league attendance: 35,729 (3rd highest in league)

The 1979–80 season was Manchester City's 78th season of competitive football and 60th season in the top division of English football. In addition to the First Division, the club competed in the FA Cup and Football League Cup.

== First Division ==
=== League table ===
Pos	Team	Pld	W	D	L	GF	GA	GD	Pts
15	Coventry City	42	16	7	19	56	66	−10	39
16	Brighton & Hove Albion	42	11	15	16	47	57	−10	37
17	Manchester City	42	12	13	17	43	66	−23	37
18	Stoke City	42	13	10	19	44	58	−14	36
19	Everton	42	9	17	16	43	51	−8	35

Source: World Football
Rules for classification: 1) Points; 2) Goal difference; 3) Goals scored

=== Results summary ===
Overall								Home						Away					
Pld	W	D	L	GF	GA	GD	Pts	W	D	L	GF	GA	GD	W	D	L	GF	GA	GD
42	12	13	17	43	66	−23	37	8	8	5	28	25	+3	4	5	12	15	41	−26

=== Results ===
18 August 1979 1	Manchester City	0–0	Crystal Palace	Manchester
		Report		Stadium: Maine Road; Attendance: 40,681; Referee: B Martin

21 August 1979 2	Middlesbrough	3–0	Manchester City	Middlesbrough
	Johnston 14'; Burns 57'; Cummins 89'	Report		Stadium: Ayresome Park; Attendance: 24,002; Referee: PJ Richardson

25 August 1979 3	Manchester City	3–2	Brighton & Hove Albion	Manchester
	Power 23'; Channon 43'; Robinson 48' (pen.)	Report	Maybank 34'; Ward 88'	Stadium: Maine Road; Attendance: 34,557; Referee: P Partridge

1 September 1979 4	Tottenham Hotspur	2–1	Manchester City	London
	Hoddle 13'; Jones 68'	Report	Mackenzie 69'	Stadium: White Hart Lane; Attendance: 30,901; Referee: A Robinson

8 September 1979 5	Manchester City	0–1	Southampton	Manchester
		Report	Holmes 24'	Stadium: Maine Road; Attendance: 34,920; Referee: AJ Hamil

15 September 1979 6	West Bromwich Albion	4–0	Manchester City	West Bromwich
	Brown 13'; Owen 35'; Robson 67', 78'	Report		Stadium: The Hawthorns; Attendance: 22,183; Referee: B Hill

22 September 1979 7	Manchester City	3–0	Coventry City	Manchester
	Robinson 5', 20'; Mackenzie 42'	Report		Stadium: Maine Road; Attendance: 30,869; Referee: A Saunders

29 September 1979 8	Leeds United	1–2	Manchester City	Leeds
	Hankin 49'; Hart (red card)	Report	Power 51'; Deyna 60'	Stadium: Elland Road; Attendance: 29,592; Referee: G Courtney

6 October 1979 9	Arsenal	0–0	Manchester City	London
		Report		Stadium: Highbury; Attendance: 35,068; Referee: RW Toseland

10 October 1979 10	Manchester City	1–0	Middlesbrough	Manchester
	Deyna 89'	Report		Stadium: Maine Road; Attendance: 29,384; Referee: DW Civil

13 October 1979 11	Manchester City	1–0	Nottingham Forest	Manchester
	Deyna 47'	Report		Stadium: Maine Road; Attendance: 41,683; Referee: K McNally

20 October 1979 12	Norwich City	2–2	Manchester City	Norwich
	Peters 50'; Bond 63' (pen.)	Report	Bennett 19', 77'	Stadium: Carrow Road; Attendance: 18,200; Referee: TG Bune

27 October 1979 13	Manchester City	0–4	Liverpool	Manchester
		Report	Johnson 12'; Dalglish 31', 67'; Kennedy 86'	Stadium: Maine Road; Attendance: 48,128; Referee: T Mills

3 November 1979 14	Crystal Palace	2–0	Manchester City	London
	Swindlehurst 28'; Walsh 70'	Report		Stadium: Selhurst Park; Attendance: 29,639; Referee: CA Maskell

10 November 1979 15	Manchester City	2–0	Manchester United	Manchester
	Henry 54'; Robinson 73'	Report		Stadium: Maine Road; Attendance: 50,067; Referee: NJ Ashley

17 November 1979 16	Bolton Wanderers	0–1	Manchester City	Bolton
		Report	Daley	Stadium: Burnden Park; Attendance: 25,515; Referee: DT Richardson

24 November 1979 17	Bristol City	1–0	Manchester City	Bristol
	Rodgers 29'	Report	Power (red card)	Stadium: Ashton Gate Stadium; Attendance: 18,549; Referee: D Hutchinson

1 December 1979 18	Manchester City	2–3	Wolverhampton Wanderers	Manchester
	Palmer 40'; Deyna 89'	Report	Gray 18'; Hibbitt 41'; Daniel 55'	Stadium: Maine Road; Attendance: 33,894; Referee: GE Flint

8 December 1979 19	Ipswich Town	4–0	Manchester City	Ipswich
	Mills 8'; Gates 12', 15', 54'	Report		Stadium: Portman Road; Attendance: 18,244; Referee: JE Martin

15 December 1979 20	Manchester City	3–0	Derby County	Manchester
	Robinson 3'; Henry 72'; Webb 79' (o.g.)	Report		Stadium: Maine Road; Attendance: 27,664; Referee: D Shaw

22 December 1979 21	Everton	1–2	Manchester City	Liverpool
	Kidd 64'	Report	Daley 11'; Henry 26'	Stadium: Goodison Park; Attendance: 26,314; Referee: GP Owen

26 December 1979 22	Manchester City	1–1	Stoke City	Manchester
	Power 16'	Report	Dodd 4'	Stadium: Maine Road; Attendance: 36,286; Referee: A Challinor

29 December 1979 23	Brighton & Hove Albion	4–1	Manchester City	Brighton and Hove
	Clarke 1', 35'; Ward 27'; Ryan 75'	Report	Lee 75'	Stadium: Goldstone Ground; Attendance: 28,040; Referee: TD Spencer

12 January 1980 24	Manchester City	1–1	Tottenham Hotspur	Manchester
	Robinson 21' (pen.)	Report	Hoddle 70'	Stadium: Maine Road; Attendance: 34,837; Referee: J Sewell

19 January 1980 25	Southampton	4–1	Manchester City	Southampton
	Channon 9'; Ball 49'; Watson 79'; Moran 86'	Report	Power 66'	Stadium: The Dell; Attendance: 21,422; Referee: DA Hedges

2 February 1980 26	Manchester City	1–3	West Bromwich Albion	Manchester
	Lee	Report	Regis 31'; Barnes 47', 85'	Stadium: Maine Road; Attendance: 32,904; Referee: R Bridges

9 February 1980 27	Coventry City	0–0	Manchester City	Coventry
		Report		Stadium: Highfield Road; Attendance: 17,185; Referee: RC Challis

16 February 1980 28	Manchester City	1–1	Leeds United	Manchester
	Power 61'	Report	Graham 10'	Stadium: Maine Road; Attendance: 34,392; Referee: MR Baker

23 February 1980 29	Nottingham Forest	4–0	Manchester City	Nottingham
	Francis 27', 56', 70'; Burns 48'	Report		Stadium: City Ground; Attendance: 27,255; Referee: TL Morris

27 February 1980 30	Aston Villa	2–2	Manchester City	Aston
	Shaw 41'; Donachie 84' (o.g.)	Report	Robinson 60' (pen.); Power 79'	Stadium: Villa Park; Attendance: 29,139; Referee: SG Bates

1 March 1980 31	Manchester City	0–0	Norwich City	Manchester
		Report		Stadium: Maine Road; Attendance: 32,348; Referee: LM Robinson

11 March 1980 32	Liverpool	2–0	Manchester City	Liverpool
	Caton 57' (o.g.); Souness 83'	Report		Stadium: Anfield; Attendance: 40,443; Referee: DW Lloyd

15 March 1980 33	Manchester City	0–3	Arsenal	Manchester
		Report	Brady 61', 81' (pen.); Stapleton 79'	Stadium: Maine Road; Attendance: 33,792; Referee: PN Willis

22 March 1980 34	Manchester United	1–0	Manchester City	Manchester
	Thomas 47'	Report		Stadium: Old Trafford; Attendance: 56,387; Referee: J Hunting

29 March 1980 35	Manchester City	2–2	Bolton Wanderers	Manchester
	Tueart 9', 47'	Report	Whatmore 48'; Reid 89' (pen.)	Stadium: Maine Road; Attendance: 33,500; Referee: A Seville

2 April 1980 36	Manchester City	1–1	Everton	Manchester
	Deyna 30'	Report	King 72'	Stadium: Maine Road; Attendance: 33,437; Referee: GM Tyson

5 April 1980 37	Stoke City	0–0	Manchester City	Stoke-on-Trent
		Report		Stadium: Victoria Ground; Attendance: 20,639; Referee: BT Stevens

7 April 1980 38	Manchester City	1–1	Aston Villa	Manchester
	Power 53'	Report	Geddis 42' (red card)	Stadium: Maine Road; Attendance: 32,943; Referee: D Owen

12 April 1980 39	Wolverhampton Wanderers	1–2	Manchester City	Wolverhampton
	Futcher 20' (o.g.)	Report	Reeves 11'; Tueart 53' (pen.)	Stadium: Molineux Stadium; Attendance: 23,850; Referee: GJ Napthine

19 April 1980 40	Manchester City	3–1	Bristol City	Manchester
	Robinson 12'; Deyna 31'; Tueart 61'	Report	Rodgers 70'	Stadium: Maine Road; Attendance: 32,745; Referee: PG Reeves

26 April 1980 41	Derby County	3–1	Manchester City	Derby
	Swindlehurst 6'; Reid 15' (o.g.); Biley 44' (pen.)	Report	Tueart 83'	Stadium: Baseball Ground; Attendance: 22,572; Referee: PJ Richardson

3 May 1980 42	Manchester City	2–1	Ipswich Town	Manchester
	Reeves 3'; Henry 12'	Report	Hunter 6'	Stadium: Maine Road; Attendance: 31,678; Referee: G Courtney

== FA Cup ==
5 January 1980 3	Halifax Town	1–0	Manchester City	Halifax
	Hendrie 75'	Report		Stadium: The Shay; Attendance: 12,599; Referee: M Lowe

== League Cup ==
=== Results ===
28 August 1979 2	Sheffield Wednesday	1–1	Manchester City	Sheffield
	King 68'	Report	Viljoen 27'	Stadium: Hillsborough Stadium; Attendance: 24,095; Referee: T Farley

4 September 1979 2	Manchester City	2–1 (3–2 agg.)	Sheffield Wednesday	Manchester
	Henry 88', 91'	Report	Smith 81' (pen.)	Stadium: Maine Road; Attendance: 24,074; Referee: CN Seel

26 September 1979 3	Manchester City	1–1	Sunderland	Manchester
	Robinson 52'	Report	Chisholm 50'	Stadium: Maine Road; Attendance: 26,181; Referee: CL Newsome

3 October 1979 3	Sunderland	1–0	Manchester City	Sunderland
	Robson 12'	Report		Stadium: Roker Park; Attendance: 33,559; Referee: KS Hackett

== Squad statistics ==
=== Appearances and goals ===
No.	Pos	Nat	Player	Total		Division 1		FA Cup		League Cup	
No.	Pos	Nat	Player	Apps	Goals	Apps	Goals	Apps	Goals	Apps	Goals
	MF	(England) ENG	Dave Bennett	27	2	23+2	2	1+0	0	1+0	0
	DF	(England) ENG	Tommy Booth	26	0	24+0	0	0+0	0	2+0	0
	DF	(England) ENG	Tommy Caton	47	0	42+0	0	1+0	0	4+0	0
	FW	(England) ENG	Mick Channon	3	1	2+0	1	0+0	0	1+0	0
	GK	(England) ENG	Joe Corrigan	47	0	42+0	0	1+0	0	4+0	0
	MF	(England) ENG	Steve Daley	36	2	33+0	2	1+0	0	2+0	0
	FW	(Poland) POL	Kazimierz Deyna	23	6	21+1	6	0+0	0	1+0	0
	DF	(Scotland) SCO	Willie Donachie	22	0	19+0	0	0+0	0	3+0	0
	DF	(England) ENG	Paul Futcher	15	0	12+1	0	0+0	0	2+0	0
	MF	(England) ENG	Tony Henry	34	6	29+3	4	1+0	0	1+0	2
	FW	(England) ENG	Stuart Lee	7	2	6+1	2	0+0	0	0+0	0
	MF	(England) ENG	Steve MacKenzie	23	2	17+2	2	0+0	0	4+0	0
	FW	(England) ENG	Roger Palmer	8	1	5+2	1	0+0	0	0+1	0
	MF	(England) ENG	Paul Power	46	7	41+0	7	1+0	0	4+0	0
	DF	(England) ENG	Ray Ranson	45	0	40+0	0	1+0	0	4+0	0
	FW	(England) ENG	Kevin Reeves	9	2	9+0	2	0+0	0	0+0	0
	DF	(England) ENG	Nicky Reid	24	0	22+1	0	1+0	0	0+0	0
	FW	(Republic of Ireland) IRL	Michael Robinson	35	9	29+1	8	1+0	0	4+0	1
	FW	(England) ENG	Bobby Shinton	6	0	5+0	0	1+0	0	0+0	0
	MF	(England) ENG	Barry Silkman	9	0	7+0	0	0+0	0	2+0	0
	DF	(Socialist Federal Republic of Yugoslavia) YUG	Dragoslav Stepanović	18	0	13+1	0	0+0	0	4+0	0
	MF	(England) ENG	Paul Sugrue	1	0	1+0	0	0+0	0	0+0	0
	MF	(England) ENG	Dennis Tueart	11	5	11+0	5	0+0	0	0+0	0
	MF	(England) ENG	Colin Viljoen	13	1	9+2	0	1+0	0	1+0	1
