= 1981 FA Cup final =

English association football championship

- Event: 1980–81 FA Cup
Tottenham Hotspur	Manchester City
- Tottenham Hotspur won after a replay

Final
Tottenham Hotspur	Manchester City
1	1
- After extra time
- Date: 9 May 1981
- Venue: Wembley Stadium, London
- Referee: Keith Hackett (South Yorkshire)
- Attendance: 100,000

Replay
Tottenham Hotspur	Manchester City
3	2
- Date: 14 May 1981
- Venue: Wembley Stadium, London
- Referee: Keith Hackett (South Yorkshire)
- Attendance: 92,000

The 1981 FA Cup Final was the 100th final of the FA Cup, and was contested by Tottenham Hotspur and Manchester City.

The original match took place on Saturday 9 May 1981 at Wembley, and finished 1–1 after extra-time. Tommy Hutchison opened the scoring for City in the 30th minute, but scored an own-goal in the 79th minute to bring Spurs level.

The replay took place five days later on Thursday 14 May 1981, and was the first replay since 1970 and the first to be staged at Wembley. Ricky Villa opened the scoring for Spurs in the eighth minute, before Steve MacKenzie, with a goal that was hit so hard the TV cameras could not follow the ball, equalised for City three minutes later. A Kevin Reeves penalty five minutes into the second half put Manchester City ahead, before Garth Crooks brought Spurs level again in the 70th minute. Then, in the 76th minute, Tony Galvin passed to Villa 30 yards from City's goal, and the Argentinian proceeded to skip past four defenders before slotting the ball past City goalkeeper Joe Corrigan. This goal was voted the Wembley Goal of the Century in 2001, and it won Tottenham the match, 3–2, and the FA Cup for the sixth time. The five goals in the replay made it the highest-scoring FA Cup Final replay.

== Match details ==
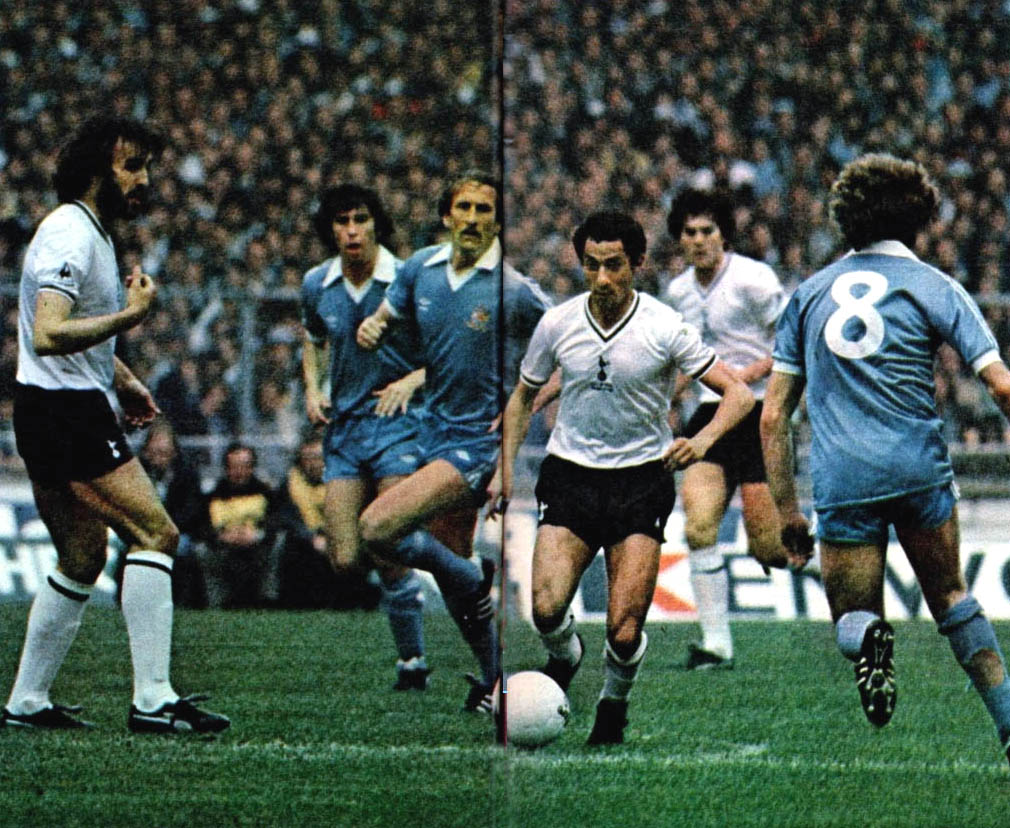
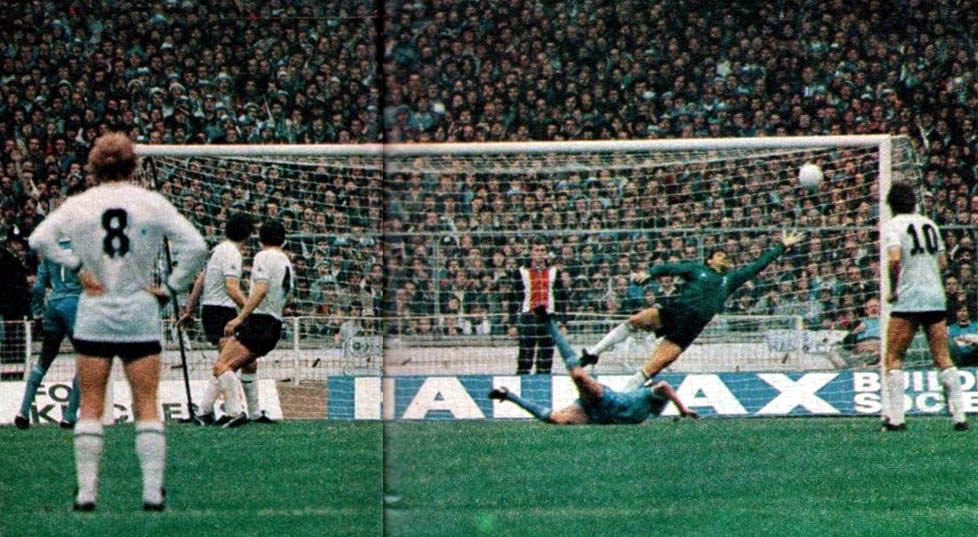
Two moments of the match, fltr: Osvaldo Ardiles carrying the ball and the Manchester City goal scored by Tommy Hutchison
9 May 1981

Tottenham Hotspur	1–1 (a.e.t.)	Manchester City
Hutchison 79' (o.g.)	Report	Hutchison 30'

Wembley Stadium, London
Attendance: 100,000
Referee: Keith Hackett (South Yorkshire)

Tottenham Hotspur	Manchester City

GK	1	(England) Milija Aleksic
LB	2	(Republic of Ireland) Chris Hughton
CB	3	(England) Paul Miller
CB	4	(England) Graham Roberts
RB	5	(England) Steve Perryman (c)
RM	6	(Argentina) Ricardo Villa	(substituted off) 68'
CM	7	(Argentina) Osvaldo Ardiles
CF	8	(Scotland) Steve Archibald
LM	9	(Republic of Ireland) Tony Galvin
CM	10	(England) Glenn Hoddle
CF	11	(England) Garth Crooks
Substitute:
MF	12	(England) Garry Brooke	(substituted on) 68'
Manager:
(England) Keith Burkinshaw

GK	1	(England) Joe Corrigan
RB	2	(England) Ray Ranson
LB	3	(Scotland) Bobby McDonald
CB	4	(England) Nicky Reid
LM	5	(England) Paul Power (c)
CB	6	(England) Tommy Caton
CF	7	(England) Dave Bennett
CM	8	(Scotland) Gerry Gow
CM	9	(England) Steve MacKenzie
RM	10	(Scotland) Tommy Hutchison	(substituted off) 105'
CF	11	(England) Kevin Reeves
Substitute:
MF	12	(England) Tony Henry	(substituted on) 105'
Manager:
(England) John Bond

Match rules

- 90 minutes
- 30 minutes of extra-time if necessary
- Replay if scores still level
- One substitute

== Replay ==
14 May 1981

Tottenham Hotspur	3–2	Manchester City
Villa 8', 76'; Crooks 70'	Report	MacKenzie 11'; Reeves 50' (pen.)

Wembley Stadium, London
Attendance: 92,000
Referee: Keith Hackett (South Yorkshire)

Tottenham Hotspur	Manchester City

GK	1	(England) Milija Aleksic
LB	2	(Republic of Ireland) Chris Hughton
CB	3	(England) Paul Miller
CB	4	(England) Graham Roberts
RM	5	(Argentina) Ricardo Villa
RB	6	(England) Steve Perryman (c)
CM	7	(Argentina) Osvaldo Ardiles
CF	8	(Scotland) Steve Archibald
LM	9	(Republic of Ireland) Tony Galvin
CM	10	(England) Glenn Hoddle
CF	11	(England) Garth Crooks
Substitute:
MF	12	(England) Garry Brooke
Manager:
(England) Keith Burkinshaw

GK	1	(England) Joe Corrigan
RB	2	(England) Ray Ranson
LB	3	(Scotland) Bobby McDonald	(substituted off) 79'
CB	4	(England) Nicky Reid
LM	5	(England) Paul Power (c)
CB	6	(England) Tommy Caton
CF	7	(England) Dave Bennett
CM	8	(Scotland) Gerry Gow
CM	9	(England) Steve MacKenzie
RM	10	(Scotland) Tommy Hutchison
CF	11	(England) Kevin Reeves
Substitute:
FW	12	(England) Dennis Tueart	(substituted on) 79'
Manager:
(England) John Bond

Match rules

- 90 minutes
- 30 minutes of extra-time if necessary
- Penalties if scores still level
- One substitute

== Cup final song ==
Tottenham's cup final song was "Ossie's Dream (Spurs Are on Their Way to Wembley)", recorded by the musical duo Chas and Dave with the Tottenham squad. Argentine player Ossie Ardiles famously sang the line "In the cup for Tottingham".
