= 1980–81 FA Cup =

Tournament details
- Country: England; Wales

Final positions
- Champions: Tottenham Hotspur (6th title)
- Runners-up: Manchester City

Tournament statistics
- Top goal scorer: Les Mutrie (7 goals)

The 1980–81 FA Cup was the 100th season of the world's oldest football knockout competition, the Football Association Challenge Cup, or FA Cup for short. The final saw Tottenham Hotspur defeat Manchester City in the first Wembley replay. The final saw a memorable solo goal from Ricky Villa that was voted the greatest goal scored at Wembley.

== Qualifying rounds ==
Most participating clubs that were not members of the Football League competed in the qualifying rounds to secure one of 28 places available in the first round.

The winners from the fourth qualifying round were Blyth Spartans, Workington, Gateshead, Fleetwood Town, Burscough, Northwich Victoria, Burton Albion, Kidderminster Harriers, Boston United, Stafford Rangers, Wycombe Wanderers, Sutton Coldfield Town, Kettering Town, St Albans City, Barton Rovers, Enfield, Barnet, Harlow Town, Wembley, Maidstone United, Gravesend & Northfleet, Yeovil Town, Addlestone & Weybridge Town, Windsor & Eton, Minehead, Farnborough Town, Leatherhead and Weymouth.

Appearing in the competition proper for the first time were Sutton Coldfield Town, Barton Rovers, Wembley, Addlestone & Weybridge Town and Farnborough Town. Additionally, the reconstituted Gateshead was appearing at this stage for the first time in their own right after predecessor club Gateshead United had folded in 1977. Of the others, St Albans City had last featured in the first round in 1968-69, Fleetwood Town's predecessor outfit Fleetwood F.C. had last done so in 1965-66 and Windsor & Eton had last done so in 1925-26.

Maidstone United played eleven matches across seven rounds of the tournament, defeating Ramsgate, Folkestone, Bromley, Barking, Kettering Town (after two replays) and Gillingham (after another two replays) before going out to Exeter City in a high-scoring encounter at the London Road Athletic Ground.

== First round proper ==
The 48 teams from the Football League Third and Fourth Divisions entered in this round, joining the 28 non-league clubs from the qualifying rounds and Altrincham, Dagenham, Mossley and Scarborough who were given byes. This round contained six clubs from Step 8 of the fledgling English Football Pyramid - Fleetwood Town, Windsor & Eton, Blyth Spartans, Burscough, Barton Rovers and Sutton Coldfield Town - who were the lowest-ranked teams remaining in the competition.

The first round of games were played on 22 November 1980. Replays were played mainly on 25 and 26 November, with a couple of games on 1 December.

Tie no	Home team	Score	Away team	Date
1	Enfield (6)	3–0	Wembley (7)	22 November 1980
2	Blackpool	4–0	Fleetwood Town (8)	22 November 1980
3	Chester	1–2	Barnsley	22 November 1980
4	Darlington	0–2	Bury	22 November 1980
5	Barnet (5)	2–2	Minehead (6)	22 November 1980
Replay	Minehead	1–2	Barnet	25 November 1980
6	Burnley	1–0	Scarborough (5)	22 November 1980
7	Yeovil Town (5)	2–1	Farnborough Town (7)	22 November 1980
8	Reading	1–2	Fulham	22 November 1980
9	Walsall	3–0	Stafford Rangers (5)	22 November 1980
10	Gillingham	2–1	Dagenham (6)	22 November 1980
11	Northwich Victoria (5)	1–1	Huddersfield Town	22 November 1980
Replay	Huddersfield Town	6–0	Northwich Victoria	25 November 1980
12	Lincoln City	1–0	Gateshead (6)	22 November 1980
13	Swindon Town	3–2	Weymouth (5)	22 November 1980
14	Tranmere Rovers	0–0	York City	22 November 1980
Replay	York City	1–2	Tranmere Rovers	25 November 1980
15	Stockport County	0–0	Sheffield United	22 November 1980
Replay	Sheffield United	3–2	Stockport County	25 November 1980
16	Wycombe Wanderers (6)	0–3	AFC Bournemouth	22 November 1980
17	Kidderminster Harriers (6)	1–1	Millwall	22 November 1980
Replay	Millwall	1–0	Kidderminster Harriers	25 November 1980
18	Brentford	2–2	Addlestone & Weybridge Town (6)	22 November 1980
Replay	Brentford	2–0	Addlestone & Weybridge Town	25 November 1980
19	Northampton Town	1–4	Peterborough United	22 November 1980
20	Plymouth Argyle	2–0	Newport County	22 November 1980
21	Hull City	2–1	Halifax Town	22 November 1980
22	Wimbledon	7–2	Windsor & Eton (8)	22 November 1980
23	Southend United	0–1	Hereford United	22 November 1980
24	Exeter City	5–0	Leatherhead (6)	22 November 1980
25	Scunthorpe United	3–1	Hartlepool United	22 November 1980
26	Blyth Spartans (8)	2–1	Burton Albion (6)	22 November 1980
27	Mansfield Town	3–1	Rochdale	22 November 1980
28	Port Vale	4–2	Bradford City	22 November 1980
29	Torquay United	2–0	Barton Rovers (8)	22 November 1980
30	Workington (6)	0–0	Carlisle United	22 November 1980
Replay	Carlisle United	4–1	Workington	1 December 1980
31	Kettering Town (5)	1–1	Maidstone United (5)	22 November 1980
Replay	Maidstone United	0–0	Kettering Town	26 November 1980
Replay	Maidstone United	3–1	Kettering Town	1 December 1980
32	Wigan Athletic	2–2	Chesterfield	22 November 1980
Replay	Chesterfield	2–0	Wigan Athletic	25 November 1980
33	Boston United (5)	0–4	Rotherham United	22 November 1980
34	Harlow Town (6)	0–2	Charlton Athletic	22 November 1980
35	Colchester United	3–0	Portsmouth	22 November 1980
36	Gravesend & Northfleet (5)	1–2	St Albans City (7)	22 November 1980
37	Burscough (8)	1–2	Altrincham (5)	22 November 1980
38	Mossley (6)	1–0	Crewe Alexandra	22 November 1980
39	Sutton Coldfield Town (8)	0–2	Doncaster Rovers	22 November 1980
40	Oxford United	1–0	Aldershot	22 November 1980

== Second round proper ==
The second round of games were intended to be played on 13 December 1980. Replays took place over 16–17 December with second replays needed in two cases. Blyth Spartans, from the Northern League at Step 8 of English football, was the lowest-ranked club in the round.

Tie no	Home team	Score	Away team	Date
1	Enfield (6)	2–0	Hereford United	13 December 1980
2	Barnet (5)	0–1	Peterborough United	13 December 1980
3	Burnley	1–1	Port Vale	13 December 1980
Replay	Port Vale	2–0	Burnley	16 December 1980
4	Bury	2–0	Lincoln City	13 December 1980
5	Gillingham	0–0	Maidstone United (5)	13 December 1980
Replay	Maidstone United	0–0	Gillingham	16 December 1980
Replay	Gillingham	0–2	Maidstone United	22 December 1980
6	Doncaster Rovers	2–1	Blackpool	13 December 1980
7	Sheffield United	1–1	Chesterfield	13 December 1980
Replay	Chesterfield	1–0	Sheffield United	16 December 1980
8	Tranmere Rovers	0–3	Huddersfield Town	13 December 1980
9	Fulham	1–0	Brentford	13 December 1980
10	Plymouth Argyle	3–0	Oxford United	13 December 1980
11	Millwall	0–1	Exeter City	13 December 1980
12	Hull City	1–1	Blyth Spartans (8)	13 December 1980
Replay	Blyth Spartans	2–2	Hull City	16 December 1980
Replay	Hull City	2–1	Blyth Spartans	22 December 1980
13	Carlisle United	3–0	Walsall	13 December 1980
14	Wimbledon	2–0	Swindon Town	13 December 1980
15	St Albans City (7)	1–1	Torquay United	13 December 1980
Replay	Torquay United	4–1	St Albans City	17 December 1980
16	Scunthorpe United	0–0	Altrincham (5)	13 December 1980
Replay	Altrincham	1–0	Scunthorpe United	15 December 1980
17	Charlton Athletic	2–1	AFC Bournemouth	13 December 1980
18	Rotherham United	0–1	Barnsley	13 December 1980
19	Colchester United	1–1	Yeovil Town (5)	13 December 1980
Replay	Yeovil Town	0–2	Colchester United	17 December 1980
20	Mossley (6)	1–3	Mansfield Town	13 December 1980

== Third round proper ==
Teams from the Football League First and Second Division entered in this round. The third round of games in the FA Cup were played on 3 January 1981. Replays took place over 6–7 January with second replays needed in two cases. One of those second replays resulted in the elimination of Cup holders West Ham United by Wrexham. Enfield, from the Isthmian League Premier Division at Step 6 of English football, was the lowest-ranked club in the round.

Tie no	Home team	Score	Away team	Date
1	Bury (4)	1–1	Fulham (3)	3 January 1981
Replay	Fulham	0–0	Bury	6 January 1981
Replay	Bury	0–1	Fulham	12 January 1981
2	Liverpool (1)	4–1	Altrincham (5)	3 January 1981
3	Preston North End (2)	3–4	Bristol Rovers (2)	3 January 1981
4	Southampton (1)	3–1	Chelsea (2)	3 January 1981
5	Leicester City (1)	3–0	Cardiff City (2)	3 January 1981
6	Notts County (2)	2–1	Blackburn Rovers (2)	3 January 1981
7	Nottingham Forest (1)	3–3	Bolton Wanderers (2)	3 January 1981
Replay	Bolton Wanderers	0–1	Nottingham Forest	6 January 1981
8	West Bromwich Albion (1)	3–0	Grimsby Town (2)	3 January 1981
9	Derby County (2)	0–0	Bristol City (2)	3 January 1981
Replay	Bristol City	2–0	Derby County	7 January 1981
10	Everton (1)	2–0	Arsenal (1)	3 January 1981
11	Ipswich Town (1)	1–0	Aston Villa (1)	3 January 1981
12	Newcastle United (2)	2–1	Sheffield Wednesday (2)	3 January 1981
13	Manchester City (1)	4–0	Crystal Palace (1)	3 January 1981
14	Queens Park Rangers(2)	0–0	Tottenham Hotspur (1)	3 January 1981
Replay	Tottenham Hotspur	3–1	Queens Park Rangers	7 January 1981
15	Barnsley (3)	2–1	Torquay United (4)	3 January 1981
16	Maidstone United (5)	2–4	Exeter City (3)	3 January 1981
17	West Ham United (2)	1–1	Wrexham (2)	3 January 1981
Replay	Wrexham	0–0	West Ham United	6 January 1981
Replay	Wrexham	1–0	West Ham United	19 January 1981
18	Manchester United (1)	2–2	Brighton & Hove Albion (1)	3 January 1981
Replay	Brighton & Hove Albion	0–2	Manchester United	7 January 1981
19	Norwich City (1)	1–0	Cambridge United (2)	3 January 1981
20	Plymouth Argyle (3)	1–2	Charlton Athletic (3)	3 January 1981
21	Hull City (3)	1–0	Doncaster Rovers (4)	3 January 1981
22	Wimbledon (4)	0–0	Oldham Athletic (2)	3 January 1981
Replay	Oldham Athletic	0–1	Wimbledon	6 January 1981
23	Huddersfield Town (3)	0–3	Shrewsbury Town (2)	3 January 1981
24	Mansfield Town (4)	2–2	Carlisle United (3)	3 January 1981
Replay	Carlisle United	2–1	Mansfield Town	6 January 1981
25	Port Vale (4)	1–1	Enfield (6)	3 January 1981
Replay	Enfield	3–0	Port Vale	6 January 1981
26	Leeds United (1)	1–1	Coventry City (1)	3 January 1981
Replay	Coventry City	1–0	Leeds United	6 January 1981
27	Stoke City (1)	2–2	Wolverhampton Wanderers(1)	3 January 1981
Replay	Wolverhampton Wanderers	2–1	Stoke City	6 January 1981
28	Peterborough United (4)	1–1	Chesterfield (3)	3 January 1981
Replay	Chesterfield	1–2	Peterborough United	6 January 1981
29	Colchester United (3)	0–1	Watford (2)	3 January 1981
30	Birmingham City (1)	1–1	Sunderland (1)	3 January 1981
Replay	Sunderland	1–2	Birmingham City	7 January 1981
31	Orient (2)	1–3	Luton Town (2)	3 January 1981
32	Swansea City (2)	0–5	Middlesbrough (1)	3 January 1981

== Fourth round proper ==
The fourth round of games were mainly played on 24 January 1981. Replays were played on 27 and 28 January. Enfield was the last non-league club left in the competition.

Tie no	Home team	Score	Away team	Date
1	Southampton	3–1	Bristol Rovers	24 January 1981
2	Watford	1–1	Wolverhampton Wanderers	24 January 1981
Replay	Wolverhampton Wanderers	2–1	Watford	27 January 1981
3	Leicester City	1–1	Exeter City	24 January 1981
Replay	Exeter City	3–1	Leicester City	28 January 1981
4	Notts County	0–1	Peterborough United	24 January 1981
5	Nottingham Forest	1–0	Manchester United	24 January 1981
6	Middlesbrough	1–0	West Bromwich Albion	24 January 1981
7	Everton	2–1	Liverpool	24 January 1981
8	Shrewsbury Town	0–0	Ipswich Town	24 January 1981
Replay	Ipswich Town	3–0	Shrewsbury Town	27 January 1981
9	Wrexham	2–1	Wimbledon	24 January 1981
10	Newcastle United	2–1	Luton Town	24 January 1981
11	Tottenham Hotspur	2–0	Hull City	24 January 1981
12	Manchester City	6–0	Norwich City	24 January 1981
13	Fulham	1–2	Charlton Athletic	24 January 1981
14	Barnsley	1–1	Enfield (6)	24 January 1981
Replay*	Enfield	0–3	Barnsley	28 January 1981
15	Coventry City	3–2	Birmingham City	24 January 1981
16	Carlisle United	1–1	Bristol City	24 January 1981
Replay	Bristol City	5–0	Carlisle United	28 January 1981

- (Played at White Hart Lane)

== Fifth round proper ==
The fifth set of games were all played on 14 February 1981. Two replays were played on 17 and 18 February.

Tie no	Home team	Score	Away team	Date
1	Southampton	0–0	Everton	14 February 1981
Replay	Everton	1–0	Southampton	17 February 1981
2	Nottingham Forest	2–1	Bristol City	14 February 1981
3	Wolverhampton Wanderers	3–1	Wrexham	14 February 1981
4	Middlesbrough	2–1	Barnsley	14 February 1981
5	Ipswich Town	2–0	Charlton Athletic	14 February 1981
6	Newcastle United	1–1	Exeter City	14 February 1981
Replay	Exeter City	4–0	Newcastle United	18 February 1981
7	Tottenham Hotspur	3–1	Coventry City	14 February 1981
8	Peterborough United	0–1	Manchester City	14 February 1981

== Sixth round proper ==
The sixth round of FA Cup games were played on 7 March 1981. There were three replays, taken place over 10–11 March.

Tie no	Home team	Score	Away team	Date
1	Nottingham Forest	3–3	Ipswich Town	7 March 1981
Replay	Ipswich Town	1–0	Nottingham Forest	10 March 1981
2	Middlesbrough	1–1	Wolverhampton Wanderers	7 March 1981
Replay	Wolverhampton Wanderers	3–1	Middlesbrough	10 March 1981
3	Everton	2–2	Manchester City	7 March 1981
Replay	Manchester City	3–1	Everton	11 March 1981
4	Tottenham Hotspur	2–0	Exeter City	7 March 1981

== Semi-finals ==
The matches were both played on 11 April 1981, with a replay on 15 April. Tottenham and Manchester City reached the Final.

11 April 1981

Manchester City	1–0 (a.e.t.)	Ipswich Town
Power

Villa Park, Birmingham
Attendance: 46,537

Referee:- Pat Partridge (Co. Durham)

11 April 1981

Tottenham Hotspur	2–2 (a.e.t.)	Wolverhampton Wanderers
Archibald 4'; Hoddle 44'		Hibbitt 5'; Carr 90' (pen.)

Hillsborough, Sheffield
Attendance: 50,174

Referee:- Clive Thomas (Porthcawl)

=== Replay ===
15 April 1981

Tottenham Hotspur	3–0	Wolverhampton Wanderers
Crooks; Crooks; Villa

Highbury, London
Attendance: 52,539

Referee:- George Courtney (Spennymoor)

== Final ==
The final was held at Wembley Stadium on 9 May 1981. The replay was held on 14 May 1981.

9 May 1981

Tottenham Hotspur	1–1 (a.e.t)	Manchester City
Hutchison 79' (o.g.)	(Report)	Hutchison 30'

Wembley, London
Attendance: 100,000
Referee: Keith Hackett (South Yorkshire)

Tottenham Hotspur	Manchester City

GK	1	(England) Milija Aleksic
LB	2	(Republic of Ireland) Chris Hughton
CB	3	(England) Paul Miller
CB	4	(England) Graham Roberts
RB	5	(England) Steve Perryman (c)
RM	6	(Argentina) Ricardo Villa	(substituted off) 68'
CM	7	(Argentina) Osvaldo Ardiles
CF	8	(Scotland) Steve Archibald
LM	9	(Republic of Ireland) Tony Galvin
CM	10	(England) Glenn Hoddle
CF	11	(England) Garth Crooks
Substitute:
MF	12	(England) Garry Brooke	(substituted on) 68'
Manager:
(England) Keith Burkinshaw

GK	1	(England) Joe Corrigan
RB	2	(England) Ray Ranson
LB	3	(Scotland) Bobby McDonald
CB	4	(England) Nicky Reid
LM	5	(England) Paul Power (c)
CB	6	(England) Tommy Caton
RM	7	(England) Dave Bennett
CM	8	(Scotland) Gerry Gow
CF	9	(England) Steve MacKenzie
CM	10	(Scotland) Tommy Hutchison	(substituted off) 105'
CF	11	(England) Kevin Reeves
Substitute:
MF	12	(England) Tony Henry	(substituted on) 105'
Manager:
(England) John Bond

Match rules

- 90 minutes.
- 30 minutes of extra-time if necessary.
- Replay if scores still level.
- One substitute.

== Replay ==
14 May 1981

Tottenham Hotspur	3–2	Manchester City
Villa 8', 76'; Crooks 70'	(Report)	MacKenzie 11'; Reeves 50' (pen.)

Wembley, London
Attendance: 92,000
Referee: Keith Hackett (Sheffield)

Tottenham Hotspur	Manchester City

GK	1	(England) Milija Aleksic
LB	2	(Republic of Ireland) Chris Hughton
CB	3	(England) Paul Miller
CB	4	(England) Graham Roberts
RM	5	(Argentina) Ricardo Villa
RB	6	(England) Steve Perryman (c)
CM	7	(Argentina) Osvaldo Ardiles
CF	8	(Scotland) Steve Archibald
LM	9	(Republic of Ireland) Tony Galvin
CM	10	(England) Glenn Hoddle
CF	11	(England) Garth Crooks
Substitute:
MF	12	(England) Garry Brooke
Manager:
(England) Keith Burkinshaw

GK	1	(England) Joe Corrigan
RB	2	(England) Ray Ranson
LB	3	(Scotland) Bobby McDonald	(substituted off) 79'
CB	4	(England) Nicky Reid
LM	5	(England) Paul Power (c)
CB	6	(England) Tommy Caton
RM	7	(England) Dave Bennett
CM	8	(Scotland) Gerry Gow
CF	9	(England) Steve MacKenzie
CM	10	(Scotland) Tommy Hutchison
CF	11	(England) Kevin Reeves
Substitute:
FW	12	(England) Dennis Tueart	(substituted on) 79'
Manager:
(England) John Bond

Match rules

- 90 minutes.
- 30 minutes of extra-time if necessary.
- Replay if scores still level.
- One substitute.

== Television coverage ==
The right to show FA Cup games were, as with Football League matches, shared between the BBC and ITV network. All games were shown in a highlights format, except the Final, which was shown live both on BBC1 and ITV. The BBC football highlights programme Match of the Day would show up to three games and the various ITV regional network stations would cover up to one game and show highlights from other games covered elsewhere on the ITV network. For the first time the BBC showed highlights of a single game from the first and second rounds after highlights of League games. ITV did not show any games from Round One or Two. Occasional highlights of replays would be shown on either the BBC or ITV.

This season ITV were showing highlights on their regional highlights programmes on Saturday nights and BBC1 were showing highlights on Match Of The Day on Sunday afternoons in the second season of the four-year alternation deal.

- First round BBC Harlow Town v Charlton Athletic
- Second round BBC Colchester United v Yeovil
- Third round BBC Ipswich Town v Aston Villa, Everton v Arsenal, Swansea City v Middlesbrough, Brighton & Hove Albion v Manchester United (Midweek replay) ITV Manchester City v Crystal Palace (Granada), Queens Park Rangers v Tottenham Hotspur (LWT), Norwich City v Cambridge United (Anglia), Leeds United v Coventry City (Yorkshire), Stoke City v Wolverhampton Wanderers (ATV), Newcastle United v Sheffield Wednesday (Tyne-Tees)
- Fourth round BBC Nottingham Forest v Manchester United, Manchester City v Norwich City, Watford v Wolverhampton Wanderers ITV Everton v Liverpool (Granada), Barnsley v Enfield (Yorkshire & LWT), Middlesbrough v West Bromwich Albion (Tyne-Tees), Shrewsbury Town v Ipswich Town (ATV & Anglia), Exeter City v Leicester City (Midweek replay All regions)
- Fifth round BBC Tottenham Hotspur v Coventry City, Peterborough United v Manchester City, Wolverhampton Wanderers v Wrexham, Exeter City v Newcastle United (Midweek replay) ITV Southampton v Everton (Southern, Granada & LWT), Middlesbrough v Barnsley (Tyne-Tees & Yorkshire), Ipswich Town v Charlton Athletic (Anglia), Nottingham Forest v Bristol City (ATV & HTV)
- Sixth round BBC Everton v Manchester City, Middlesbrough v Wolverhampton Wanderers ITV Nottingham Forest v Ipswich Town (ATV & Anglia), Tottenham Hotspur v Exeter City (LWT) All regions showed these two games Ipswich Town v Nottingham Forest (Midweek replay all regions), Wolverhampton Wanderers v Middlesbrough (Midweek replay all regions)
- Semi-finals BBC Ipswich Town v Manchester City, Tottenham Hotspur v Wolverhampton Wanderers (Midweek replay) ITV Tottenham Hotspur v Wolverhampton Wanderers (All Regions)
- Final Manchester City v Tottenham Hotspur Both BBC and ITV showed both games live.
