= John Holder (umpire) =

English cricketer and Test umpire

Personal information
- Full name: John Wakefield Holder
- Born: 19 March 1945 (age 81); Saint George, Barbados
- Nickname: Hod
- Height: 6 ft 0 in (1.83 m)
- Batting: Right-handed
- Bowling: Right-arm fast-medium

Domestic team information
- Years: Team
- 1968–1972: Hampshire
- 1974/75: Western Province

Umpiring information
- Tests umpired: 11 (1988–2001)
- ODIs umpired: 19 (1988–2001)
- WODIs umpired: 6 (2005–2009)
- FC umpired: 421 (1982–2009)
- LA umpired: 449 (1982–2009)
- T20 umpired: 41 (2003–2009)

Career statistics
Competition	First-class	List A
Matches	48	40
Runs scored	381	114
Batting average	10.29	6.33
100s/50s	0/0	0/0
Top score	33	25
Balls bowled	7,194	1,860
Wickets	139	46
Bowling average	24.80	26.36
5 wickets in innings	5	0
10 wickets in match	1	0
Best bowling	7/79	3/18
Catches/stumpings	13/–	9/–
- Source: Cricinfo, 22 August 2023

John Wakefield Holder (born 19 March 1945) is a Barbadian-born English former first-class cricketer and international cricket umpire. Holder was born in Saint George, Barbados. After completing his education, he emigrated to England in search of work with London Transport. After impressing in club cricket in London, Holder began playing county cricket for Hampshire as a fast-medium bowler, in a first-class county career that lasted from 1968 to 1972. Injury forced Holder to retire from professional cricket, though he later returned to play professionally in the Lancashire League and for Western Province in South Africa. After the conclusion of his playing career, Holder became an umpire at the domestic and international levels. He would stand as an umpire in both Test and One Day International cricket from 1988 to 2001. Holder retired from umpiring in 2009, having stood in over 400 first-class and List A one-day matches apiece. As of 2021, he remained the only non-white English umpire in nearly 150 years of Test cricket.

== Early life ==
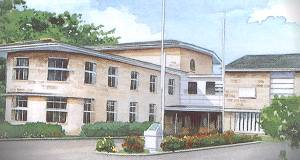
Combermere School (pictured), where Holder was educated.

The fifth of six children, Holder was born on 19 March 1945 in the community of Superlative in the parish of Saint George, Barbados. As a child he would often help his father, who was a lorry driver, load sugarcane onto his lorry during the harvest season for transportation to sugar factories around the island. He and his family survived Hurricane Janet in 1955, which caused severe damage and 38 deaths across Barbados. Holder attended Combermere School from the age of eleven, where he was on the school cricket team. He played as a fast bowler, but was not coached to bowl; instead he taught himself by watching Wes Hall, Charlie Griffith, and Roy Gilchrist. Amongst Combermere's rivals were Harrison College. In a match between the two in 1963, he shared in a last-wicket partnership of 109 runs to lead Combermere to victory.

He gained further experience through Combermere's participation in the First Division of the National Men's League, playing alongside many of the leading Barbadian cricketers of the time. Despite an increasing reputation in Barbados as a fast bowler, his progress at club level was restricted by the social norms of the time, with segregation and elitism restricting progress by Black Barbadians. He overcame this by joining Central Cricket Club; though considered a team for White Barbadians, Black Barbadians who had attended Combermere were accepted.

After completing his education, Holder gained employment in the electrical department of a large store. However, with little career prospects on the island, he answered a call by London Transport in 1964, who were actively seeking to employ Barbadians to curb the post-war labour shortage which still persisted. Holder was one of thousands of Barbadians who relocated to England and initially settled in Harrow on the Hill, courtesy of a contact in the Labour Department back in Barbados who set him up with accommodation. Finding the accommodation substandard, he moved firstly to a bedsit in Shepherd's Bush, before settling in Battersea. For London Transport, Holder was employed as a conductor on the London Underground. In 1965, Holder began playing club cricket in London for the Caribbean Cricket Club, a nomadic club made up of Caribbean diaspora. As word spread of Holder's bowling abilities, he was extended an invitation by the British Broadcasting Corporation (BBC) to play for their cricket team, based at Motspur Park. Former West Indian international Bertie Clarke, who played for the BBC, spoke to then Hampshire captain Roy Marshall about Holder, who invited him to Southampton for a trial.

== Cricket career ==
=== First-class playing career ===
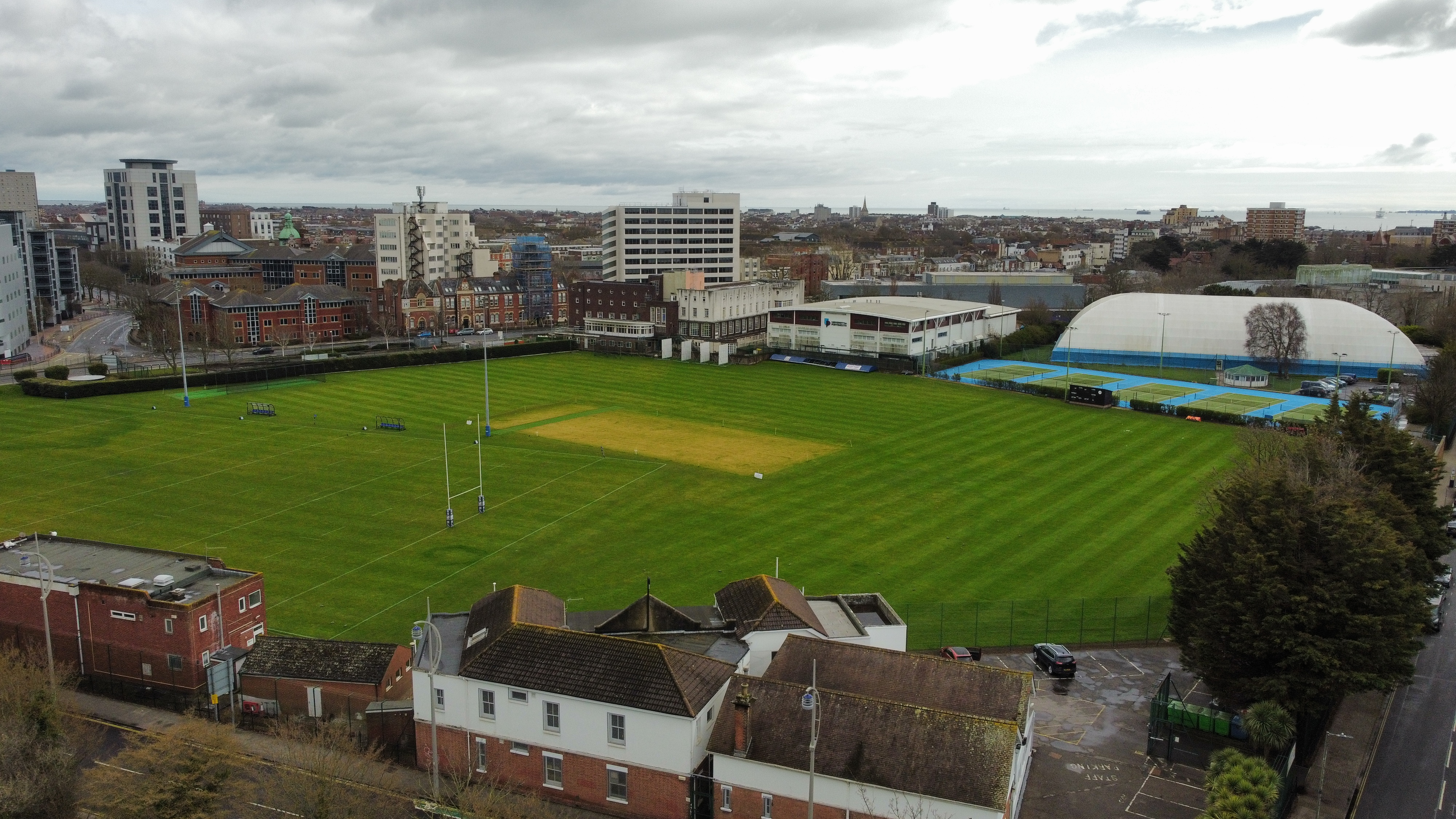
Holder made his debut for Hampshire in June 1968 at the United Services Recreation Ground (pictured).

Upon arriving at Southampton in May 1966, Holder was instructed to accompany the Hampshire Second XI to Wells to play the Somerset Second XI, though the match was rained-off. He remained in the Second XI for two seasons, gaining experience and honing his technique, at a time when Hampshire had a settled seam bowling attack consisting of Butch White, Derek Shackleton and Bob Cottam. Having quit his job on the underground and turned down an offer of employment from the BBC in order to relocate to Southampton, he sought employment during the winter months as a labourer at the Husbands Shipyard on the River Test. He was sacked from there, before finding work at Debenhams and later British American Tobacco (BAT) in 1967. By 1968, he had served his two-year qualification period and was eligible to play for Hampshire in the County Championship. Around this time, his father died from stomach cancer in Barbados.

Following an injury to White in June 1968, he was selected to make his debut in first-class cricket for Hampshire against Somerset at Portsmouth; he claimed five wickets in Somerset's first innings, taking 5 wickets for 96 runs. Though his selection continued after his debut, Holder took advice during the season to modify his bowling action, which had the effect of reducing his accuracy; as a result, he reduced his pace and became less effective. He was dropped from the Hampshire side at the end of July and did not play again until the end of August. He made seven first-class appearances in 1968, taking 18 wickets at an average of 26.72. The following season, he featured in just five first-class matches, though he did make his debut in List A one-day cricket against Kent in the 1969 Player's County League, making six appearances in the competition. With the retirement of Shackleton in 1969, Holder was presented with more playing opportunities. He had his most successful season in 1970, taking 55 first-class wickets at an average of 23.27, from fifteen matches. That winter, he continued his employment with BAT. On Christmas Eve, he was overcome with "unbearable" and "agonising" back pain whilst getting out of bed; a specialist diagnosed him with an inflamed sacroiliac joint and was prescribed physiotherapy at the Royal South Hants Hospital. In the New Year, his pain relented and he was able to begin walking again, though the injury had caused Holder to consider if his career was over. While he returned to bowling, he considered that the back injury had a detrimental impact on his bowling, leading to him to feel that he had become a slower bowler.

Holder returned to the Hampshire side in June 1971, making seven first-class appearances in the remainder of that season, alongside eight one-day appearances. He featured more for Hampshire in 1972, making thirteen first-class appearances and finished the season third in the Hampshire bowling averages, with 40 wickets at an average of 24.27. He played in two matches of note, against Gloucestershire where he took his best bowling figures of 6 for 49 and 7 for 79 (match figures of 13 for 128), and against Kent, where he took a hat-trick. In one-day cricket, he made sixteen appearances in 1972, taking 18 wickets at an average of exactly 24, which included his career-best figures of 3 for 18. Following the end of the 1972 season, he returned to Barbados to take part in the Test trials for the representative West Indian team, which county-based West Indian cricketers had been invited to (amongst them were his Hampshire teammate Gordon Greenidge) by the West Indies Cricket Board of Control. However, before he could attend the trials, his longstanding back injury relapsed. This led to the realisation that his full-time professional career as a cricketer was over. In 47 first-class matches for Hampshire, he took 139 wickets at an average of 24.56. With the bat, he scored 374 runs at a batting average of 10.68, with a highest score of 33. In 40 one-day matches, he took 46 wickets at an average of 26.36, with best figures of 3 for 18. He was often utilised by Hampshire as a fourth-change bowler, and throughout his career he was noted for his non-repetitive bowling action, which sometimes affected his consistency and accuracy.

Despite retiring from the first-class game, Holder was persuaded by a friend in Lancashire to join Rawtenstall Cricket Club in the Lancashire League as their professional. In the winter months, Holder would coach abroad. In the winter of 1974, he took a coaching job in South Africa, which was then under the apartheid regime; during his time coaching in the country, he was considered an "honorary white man". He played in a final first-class match whilst in South Africa, appearing for Western Province against Eastern Province in the 1974–75 Dadabhay Trophy, going wicketless in the match. After one season playing for Rawtenstall, he spent the next two seasons playing for Royton Cricket Club in the Greater Manchester League.

=== Umpiring career ===
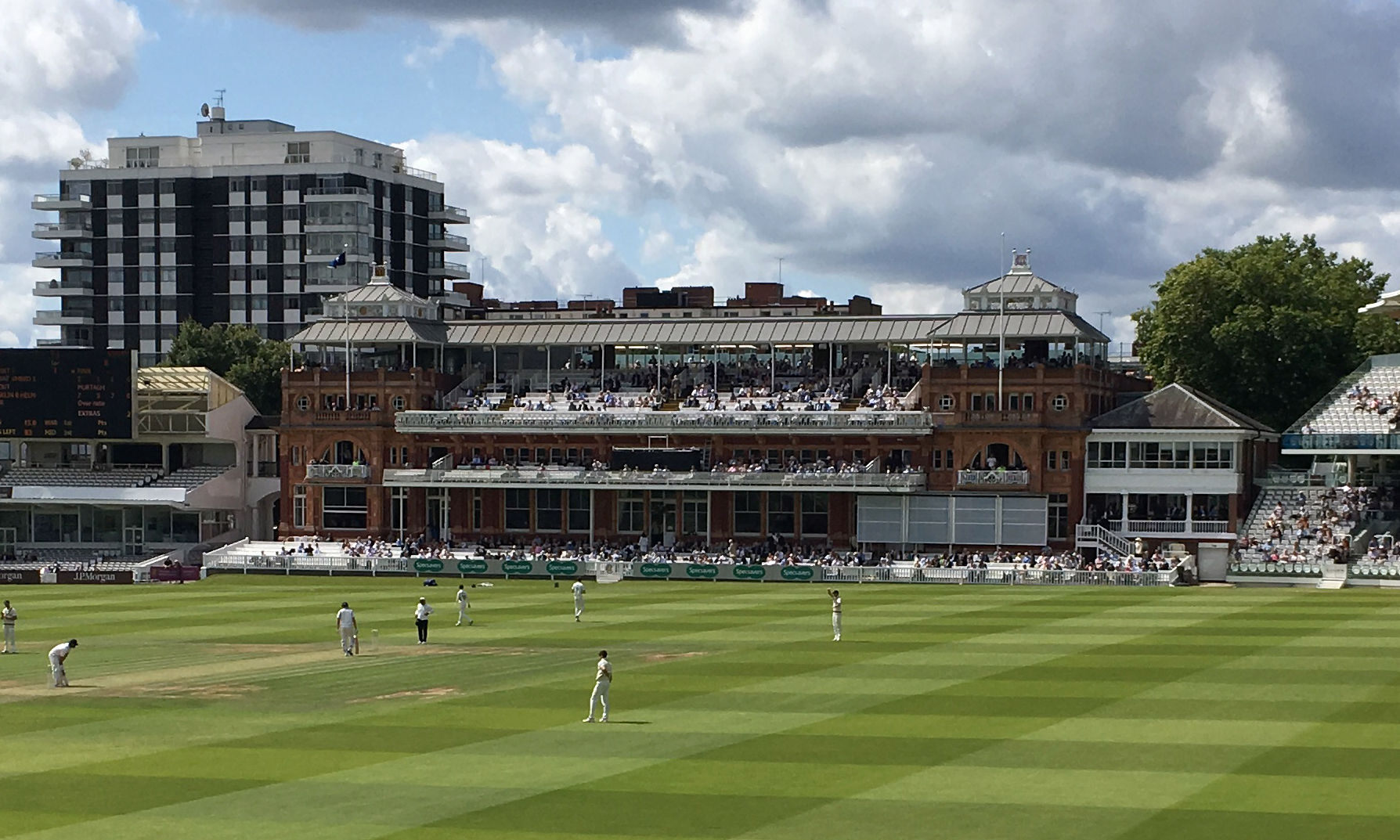
Holder stood in his first Test match at Lord's (pictured) in August 1988.

Having missed the professional culture and context of the professional game, Holder decided to become a first-class umpire. Having stood as an umpire in two first-class university matches in 1982, Holder was added to the first-class umpires list in 1983. He officiated in his first County Championship match later that season, between Leicestershire and Essex at Grace Road. After the end of the English season, Holder would coach abroad. His coaching took him to Western Australia following the 1987 season, alongside Jack Birkenshaw. There, he was a regular attendee at Sheffield Shield matches, which he used to familiarise himself with umpiring in another country. While doing so, he befriended the Australian umpire Terry Prue. It was while Holder was in Australia that his wife, Glenda, received a phone call from Brian Langley, the umpiring coordinator at Lord's, informing her that Holder had been elevated to the Test umpires panel.

Upon his elevation to the Test panel for the 1988 season, he became the first black Englishman to be appointed to the Test and County Cricket Board Test match list. He stood in his first Test match in August 1988 at Lord's, when England played Sri Lanka; he subsequently stood in a One Day International (ODI) between the sides following the Test series. The following year, he stood in the 1st and 3rd Test's of the 1989 Ashes series. He stood in an ODI between the sides which followed the series, and later in October of the same year, stood in five ODIs in the Nehru Cup. Alongside John Hampshire, he was the first neutral umpire appointed to stand in a Test match series, when Pakistan played India in late 1989. During the 3rd Test, Holder noticed that both teams were engaged in ball tampering, for which he summoned both coaches and captains. However, due to the Laws of Cricket at the time, he could not apply any sanctions to either team.

After standing in two Test matches in 1990, where England played both New Zealand and India, Holder umpired the 5th Test between England and the West Indies in August the following year. Controversy arose in this match, when he accused England's Phil Tufnell of ball tampering. Following the match, Holder sent his match report to Lord's, but did not receive a reply; two months later he was dropped from the Test panel without explanation, though rumours persisted he was dropped because it was thought he was tired and needed a rest. His removal from the umpire's panel would later form the basis of a racial discrimination claim, launched in December 2021, against the England and Wales Cricket Board (ECB) (the successor of the TCCB), with Holder believing his removal from the panel was racially motivated. His claim was launched alongside former cricketer Ismail Dawood, but their claim was ultimately withdrawn in June 2021. However, despite his removal from the Test panel, he continued to umpire in ODI's. During the 1993 Champions Trophy, Holder was offered £10,000 by a Pakistani betting syndicate to fix an ODI between Sri Lanka and the West Indies; Holder rejected the approach, telling the conspirators to "keep your £10,000". He stood in six further ODI's, the last coming in 2001 between England and Pakistan in the 2001 NatWest Series. Following a ten-year absence from Test cricket, Holder returned to officiate in the 2nd Test of the 2001 Ashes Series at Lord's, which would be his last. In total, he stood as umpire in eleven Test matches and nineteen ODI's. As of 2021, he remained the only non-white English umpire in nearly 150 years of Test cricket.

Holder continued to officiate in domestic cricket, before retiring at the end of the 2009 season, after 27 years as a first-class umpire; the second to last first-class match in which he officiated in was played at the Rose Bowl, Hampshire's home ground since 2001. In total, he stood as an umpire in 421 first-class, 449 List A, and 41 Twenty20 matches. He was described as "a very strong and competent umpire" by the umpire Barrie Leadbeater. In the latter stages of his umpiring career, he was appointed by the International Cricket Council as one of five worldwide regional umpires' performance managers, responsible for monitoring and improving the performances of umpires in Europe, the Caribbean, America and Canada. During his umpiring career, Holder is credited alongside Don Oslear with the idea of a 'bowl-out' to decide a drawn match, after the 55-over 1987 Tilcon Trophy final had been washed out by rain. The organisers had ordered them to think of another way of settling the match rather than the traditional and sometimes unpopular means of the toss of a coin. This idea was subsequently adopted into all ECB limited-overs competitions. Following his retirement, he continued to umpire in the Central Lancashire Cricket League, until he quit in 2014, citing poor player behaviour as his reason.

=== Works and administration ===
In 2000, Holder was consultant on the film The Laws of Cricket, 2000 Code which was shot in Barbados. The film featured an interview with Holder and Sir Garfield Sobers, and was directed by award-winning British film director Marcus Dillistone. He later co-authored the book You Are The Umpire in 2009 with the illustrator Paul Trevillion. The book was based on a comic strip that was included in the sports section of the British newspaper The Observer and bears similarities with You Are The Ref as both highlight unusual or difficult decisions that have to be made by sporting officials. In February 2016, he accepted an invitation to become the first president of the newly founded Pennine Cricket League. However, the league only lasted two seasons and was disbanded in 2017. He was a regular contributor to the "Ask the Umpire" feature on BBC Radio's Test Match Special until August 2024.

== Personal life ==
As of 2020, Holder is still to Glenda, with the couple living in Rochdale. He has two grandsons. After retiring from cricket, Holder became active with his local Rotary International branch, serving as its president in 2016 and 2017. In 2016, he received a golden jubilee medal marking the 50th anniversary of Barbados' independence from the United Kingdom; Holder was one of fifty Barbadians recognised for making a significant difference in Anglo-Barbadian relations.

== See also ==
- List of Test cricket umpires
- List of One Day International cricket umpires

== Works cited ==
- Murtagh, Andrew (2016). Test of Character. Brighton: Pitch Publishing Limited. ISBN 9781785312427.
- Sandiford, Keith A. P. (1998). Cricket Nurseries of Colonial Barbados. Mona, Jamaica: Press University of the West Indies. ISBN 9789766400460.
- Trevillion, Paul; Holder, John (2019). You Are The Umpire. London: The Guardian. ISBN 9780852650776 – via Internet Archive.
