= Keith Hackett =

English football referee (born 1944)

- Full name: Keith Stuart Hackett
- Born: 22 June 1944 (age 82); Sheffield, South Yorkshire, England
- Other occupation: General manager

Domestic
Years	League	Role
–1975	Northern Premier League	Referee
1972–1976	Football League	Linesman
1975–1976	(Supplementary List)	Referee
1976–1992	Football League	Referee
1992–1994	Premier League	Referee

International
Years	League	Role
1981–1991	FIFA listed	Referee

Keith Stuart Hackett (born 22 June 1944) is an English former football referee, who began refereeing in local leagues in the Sheffield, South Yorkshire area in 1960. He is counted amongst the top 100 referees of all time in a list maintained by the International Federation of Football History and Statistics (IFFHS).

Keith is currently the president of non-league club Penistone Church FC.

== Career ==
He reached the Northern Premier League and became a Football League linesman in 1972. Three years later he advanced to the Supplementary List of referees and one year later in 1976 to the full List at the age of only thirty two. He made progress and in 1979 was senior linesman to Ron Challis in the FA Cup Final. The next season, he took charge of an FA Cup semi-final between Arsenal and Liverpool. The match required a replay, which he also handled, but that ended all-square as well, and two further replays were required to separate the teams.

The following season saw him step up to the ultimate domestic honour of the 1981 FA Cup Final at Wembley, finishing 1–1 between Spurs and Manchester City. Aged only thirty six at the time, he was one of the youngest Cup Final referees. Tommy Hutchison of City scored both goals, causing the game to go to a replay, which Hackett also refereed at Wembley, the game ending 3–2 to Tottenham. He was then appointed to the FIFA List for the following season of 1981–82.

He was then appointed to the 1984 Charity Shield match, in which Everton defeated Liverpool 1–0, courtesy of a Bruce Grobbelaar own goal. In 1986, he refereed the League Cup Final, where Oxford United beat QPR 3–0, thus winning their only knockout trophy.

Internationally, he was a match official at the 1988 European Championships, in which he took control of West Germany's 1–1 draw with Italy in Group A on 10 June at the Rheinstadion.

Hackett also officiated at the 1988 Olympic Football Tournament, handling the semi-final between Brazil and West Germany, which Brazil won on penalties following a 1–1 scoreline after extra time.

He refereed the 1990–91 league encounter between Manchester United and Arsenal at Old Trafford, a match notorious for the 21-man brawl breaking out just after the hour mark. The melee resulted in Arsenal being docked two points and Manchester United one by The Football Association, upon a three-hour consultation with Hackett and his match officials.

He continued to be one of the senior English referees, even after his retirement on age grounds from the FIFA List at the end of 1991. Although he reached the English retirement age at the end of the 1991–92 season, he was granted an extension and was one of the first set of Premier League referees for its inaugural 1992–93 campaign. He was granted another extra season on top of this before retiring just short of his 50th birthday in 1994.

== In retirement ==
He later worked as a referees' assessor before, on 1 March 2004, he was appointed general manager of the Professional Game Match Officials Board, replacing Philip Don.

Hackett has also worked to promote knowledge of refereeing via several publications. He published his own book, Hackett's Law; a Referee's Notebook! in 1986. And he continued to provide the answers for cult classic cartoon quiz You Are The Ref, drawn by sports artist Paul Trevillion, which he has done since the 1970s - originally for Shoot magazine, and then for The Observer newspaper. He co-authored a book with Trevillion celebrating 50 years of the strip in December 2006. And from August 2008, The Observer's collection of You Are The Ref strips appeared online at guardian.co.uk.

In early 2007, Hackett also produced a DVD-ROM with Trevillion called Referee Academy, for use in the training of match officials, with sanction from the FA, the Football League and the Premier League. During the 2007–08 season, he also wrote a regular column in the matchday programme for Crystal Palace and now writes for various football news websites about refereeing decisions.

Preceded by George Courtney	FA Cup Final Referee; 1981	Succeeded by Clive White
