= You Are The Ref =

British comic strip

A You Are The Ref cartoon showing an incident in a penalty shootout. Fernando Torres is the chosen portrait.

You Are The Ref is a British comic strip which has run in various publications since 1957, featuring a series of improbable hypothetical football scenarios that then invites the reader to make the refereeing decision. Created by sports artist Paul Trevillion, also famous for Roy of the Rovers, the strip features contributions from several top referees, and was collected into an official book in 2006. From 2006 to 2016 it featured online on theguardian.com. and in The Observer newspaper.

== Publication history ==
The evolution of the strip began in 1952 in the Tottenham Hotspur magazine The Lillywhite, which featured a cartoon quiz by Paul Trevillion. The quiz included one question per issue on refereeing. Five years later, The People newspaper signed Trevillion to produce a dedicated refereeing cartoon quiz, and gave it the title Hey Ref.

In the 1960s, the strip began appearing in a much larger format alongside Trevillion's work for Roy of the Rovers in official Roy annuals, under the title If You Were The Ref. But it was in 1969 that the strip took on its famous name, when it moved to be part of newly launched children's football magazine Shoot. The strip continued to run until 1983.

Trevillion returned to You Are The Ref in 2006, producing new artwork for the strip for the first time in over 20 years, which was published in The Observer newspaper. Later that year, a book was published collecting the history of the strip. In 2008, You Are The Ref also appeared on the BBC's Euro 2008 blog, and on the website of The Guardian. In its most recent incarnation it relied on reader submissions for the three questions posed each week. As well as the illustrated questions, each strip includes a portrait of a well-known footballing person. New full colour feature strips were produced for The Observer until 2016. As of 2021 the most recent publication is a book published by Octopus Books in October 2018.

In June 2010, in advance of the 2010 FIFA World Cup, You Are The Ref was released as an iPhone / iPod Touch game developed by game developer Four Door Lemon.

== Referees ==
When the strip moved to Shoot in 1969, leading referee Stan Lover, head of the London referees' association, was taken on to provide the answers to the questions You Are The Ref posed each week. In subsequent years, Lover was replaced by Clive Thomas, and then by Keith Hackett, who provided the answers in The Observer strips.

== You Are The Umpire ==
A cricketing equivalent, You Are The Umpire, also drawn by Trevillion, took You Are The Ref's place in The Observer during football off-seasons from 2007 to 2016. Umpire John Holder provided the expert answers.

== Books ==
- Paul Trevillion (2006). "You are the Ref": 50 Years of the Cult Classic Cartoon Strip. Guardian Books. ISBN 9780852650691.
- Paul Trevillion; John Holder (2009). You Are the Umpire. Random House. ISBN 978-0-85265-077-6.
- Paul Trevillion; Keith Hackett (2010). You Are the Ref: The Ultimate Illustrated Guide to the Laws of Football. Random House. ISBN 978-0-85265-148-3.
- Paul Trevillion; Keith Hackett (25 April 2013). You Are The Ref: A Guide to Good Refereeing. Bloomsbury Publishing. ISBN 978-1-4081-8170-6. (electronic edition)
- Paul Trevillion; Keith Hackett (2014). You are the ref 3. Faber & Faber. ISBN 9781783350216.
- Paul Trevillion; Keith Hackett (2018). You are the ref. London. ISBN 978-1-78840-075-6. OCLC 1065346846.
