= Nicky Reid =

English footballer

Personal information
- Full name: Nicholas Scott Reid
- Date of birth: 30 October 1960 (age 66)
- Place of birth: Davyhulme, England
- Height: 5 ft 10 in (1.78 m)
- Position: Defender

Senior career*
Years	Team	Apps	(Gls)
1977–1987	Manchester City	216	(2)
1982	→ Seattle Sounders (loan)	24	(1)
1987–1992	Blackburn Rovers	174	(9)
1992	Bristol City	4	(0)
1992–1994	West Bromwich Albion	20	(1)
1994–1995	Wycombe Wanderers	8	(0)
1995–1997	Bury	25	(0)
1997	Sligo Rovers	43	(3)
Total		514	(15)

International career
1981–1982	England U21	6	(0)

Managerial career
- 1997–1999: Sligo Rovers
- * Club domestic league appearances and goals

Nicholas Scott Reid (born 30 October 1960) is an English former football defender. He played at both centre back and full back during his career.

== Career ==
Reid played 217 times for Manchester City F.C. and scored twice in two spells at the club between 1977 and 1982 and 1982 and 1987 before transferring to Blackburn Rovers F.C. in July 1987. In 1982, he played on loan to the Seattle Sounders of the North American Soccer League. Reid was a finalist for City in the 100th FA Cup Final of 1981 with the likes of Ray Ranson and Tommy Caton. His brother Andy also played football for non-league Altrincham, where he was known as 'Hagar The Horrible' and later played league football for Bury for 18 months until he returned to Altrincham in November 1993. Andy also played in the centre of defence. They also have two other brothers called Simon and Jonathan.

He helped Blackburn win promotion to the new FA Premier League in the 1991–92 season, but did not make the squad for the playoff final in which they beat Leicester City and it was soon clear that his days at Ewood Park were numbered as manager Kenny Dalglish looked to make use of chairman Jack Walker's vast financial resources to turn Blackburn into the best team in the country.

Reid joined West Bromwich Albion for the 1992–93 season helping the club win promotion from Division Two; he was on the scoresheet when Albion beat Port Vale 3–0 in the playoff final at Wembley Stadium, his only goal for the club.

Reid signed for Sligo Rovers as a player in 1997, but took over as player-manager when Jimmy Mullen left in July 1997. In his first season, he took the club on its longest ever unbeaten run and saw them claim the FAI League Cup in February 1998, beating Shelbourne over two legs in the final (Reid captained the side). His second season didn't go as well and the club just escaped relegation from the top flight on the final day thanks to a 2–0 win against Derry City. Reid was then released from his contract and he went back to England. He studied for a part-time degree in Sports Rehabilitation from the University of Salford.

Reid was appointed assistant physiotherapist at Burnley in 2000. He left in 2004 to take up a position with Manchester City, where he stayed until 2005. He was part of Chief Physiotherapist Jim Webb's staff and was involved mainly with the club's reserve side. Reid joined Barrow AFC as their fitness coach in October 2005, before joining Bury FC as Chief Physiotherapist in February 2006. He left them in July 2007 by mutual consent and became physio at Hyde United, and in January 2008 became Paul Lake's replacement as Macclesfield Town Physio.

He completed a second degree at the University of Salford in 2008, this time in Physiotherapy.

He also regularly appears with the City 'Past Masters' team.

== Honours ==
Manchester City

- FA Cup runner-up: 1980–81
- Full Members' Cup runner-up: 1985–86

West Bromwich Albion

- Football League Second Division play-offs: 1993

Wycombe Wanderers

- Football League Third Division play-offs: 1994

Sligo Rovers

- FAI League Cup: 1997–98
