= Andrew Caton =

English footballer

Andy Caton
Personal information
- Full name: Andrew James Caton
- Date of birth: 3 December 1987 (age 38)
- Place of birth: Oxford, England
- Height: 6 ft 2 in (1.88 m)
- Position: Forward

Youth career
- Southampton
- North Leigh

Senior career*
Years	Team	Apps	(Gls)
2004–2008	Swindon Town	15	(1)
2007	→ Swindon Supermarine (loan)		
2007	→ North Leigh (loan)		
2008	→ Brackley Town (loan)		
2008	Witney United		
2008–2009	Team Bath		
2009	Oxford City		
2009	Weymouth		
2009–2015	North Leigh		
2015	Hanwell Town		
2024–2025	Witney Town		
- * Club domestic league appearances and goals

Andrew James Caton (born 3 December 1987) is an English former footballer who played in midfield. He played in the Football League for Swindon Town.

== Career ==
Caton was born in Oxford; his father, Tommy Caton, was at the time an Oxford United player. Caton began his career in the Southampton centre of excellence, and played for North Leigh in the Hellenic Football League, before joining Swindon Town on a scholarship in 2004. He made his first-team debut a few weeks later, aged 16, on 7 August, as a 74th-minute substitute away to Wrexham in League One and scored a late goal as Swindon lost 2–1. His Swindon career was disrupted by injuries, and he spent several spells on loan to non-League clubs, before he was released in January 2008. He played 15 matches for Swindon, with five starts, and scored once.

He then played for Witney United, Team Bath, Oxford City, Weymouth and North Leigh. He returned to the newly relaunched Witney Town F.C. for the 2024-25 Oxfordshire Senior League Division Two season.
