= 1993–94 Pepsi Champions Trophy =

International cricket tournament

1993 Pepsi Champions Trophy
- Cricket format: One Day International
- Host: United Arab Emirates
- Champions: West Indies
- Runners-up: Pakistan
- Participants: 3
- Matches: 7
- Player of the series: (Cricket West Indies) PV Simmons
- Most runs: (Pakistan) Saeed Anwar (387)
- Most wickets: (Pakistan) Wasim Akram (9) (Cricket West Indies) KCG Benjamin (9)

The 1993 Pepsi Champions Trophy was a cricket tournament held in Sharjah, UAE, between October 28-November 5, 1993. Three national teams took part: Pakistan, Sri Lanka and West Indies.

The 1993 Champions Trophy started with a double round-robin tournament where each team played the other twice. The two leading teams qualified for the final. West Indies won the tournament and US$37,500, runners-up Pakistan won US$22,500 and Sri Lanka US$10,000.

The beneficiaries of the tournament were Mohammad Nazir (Pakistan), Shoaib Mohammad (Pakistan) and Desmond Haynes (West Indies) who each received US$35,000.

== Matches ==
=== Group stage ===
Team	P	W	L	T	NR	RR	Points
Pakistan	4	3	1	0	0	5.401	6
West Indies	4	3	1	0	0	4.782	6
Sri Lanka	4	0	4	0	0	4.139	0

28 October 1993
Scorecard

Sri Lanka; 172 (48.5 overs)	v	West Indies; 173/2 (46 overs)
A Ranatunga 83* (93); AC Cummins 3/32 (9 overs)		PV Simmons 92 (161); AP Gurusinha 1/14 (3 overs)

West Indies won by 8 wickets
Sharjah Cricket Stadium, Sharjah, UAE
Umpires: HD Bird (ENG) and DR Shepherd (ENG)
Player of the match: PV Simmons (WI)

- West Indies won the toss and elected to field.

29 October 1993
Scorecard

West Indies; 267/7 (50 overs)	v	Pakistan; 228/9 (50 overs)
KLT Arthurton 84 (100); Wasim Akram 3/36 (10 overs)		Asif Mujtaba 60* (91); CL Hooper 3/33 (10 overs)

West Indies won by 39 runs
Sharjah Cricket Stadium, Sharjah, UAE
Umpires: JW Holder (ENG) and DR Shepherd (ENG)
Player of the match: JC Adams (WI)

- Pakistan won the toss and elected to field.

30 October 1993
Scorecard

Pakistan; 313/3 (50 overs)	v	Sri Lanka; 199/7 (50 overs)
Asif Mujtaba 113* (134); CPH Ramanayake 2/54 (10 overs)		ST Jayasuriya 58 (70); Wasim Akram 2/21 (8 overs)

Pakistan won by 114 runs
Sharjah Cricket Stadium, Sharjah, UAE
Umpires: HD Bird (ENG) and JW Holder (ENG)
Player of the match: Asif Mujtaba (PAK)

- Sri Lanka won the toss and elected to field.

1 November 1993
Scorecard

West Indies; 260/9 (50 overs)	v	Pakistan; 261/5 (49 overs)
PV Simmons 81 (94); Wasim Akram 4/40 (10 overs)		Saeed Anwar 131 (141); CL Hooper 1/43 (9 overs)

Pakistan won by 5 wickets
Sharjah Cricket Stadium, Sharjah, UAE
Umpires: JW Holder (ENG) and DR Shepherd (ENG)
Player of the match: Saeed Anwar (PAK)

- West Indies won the toss and elected to bat.

2 November 1993
Scorecard

Sri Lanka; 270/6 (50 overs)	v	Pakistan; 271/8 (49.4 overs)
ST Jayasuriya 65 (56); Saleem Malik 2/52 (9 overs)		Saeed Anwar 111 (104); DK Liyanage 3/49 (10 overs)

Pakistan won by 2 wickets
Sharjah Cricket Stadium, Sharjah, UAE
Umpires: HD Bird (ENG) and JW Holder (ENG)
Player of the match: Saeed Anwar (PAK)

- Sri Lanka won the toss and elected to bat.
- Aamer Hanif (PAK) made his ODI debut.

3 November 1993
Scorecard

Sri Lanka; 182/9 (50 overs)	v	West Indies; 183/2 (38.4 overs)
RS Kalpage 30 (47); RA Harper 3/31 (10 overs)		PV Simmons 90* (109); RS Kalpage 1/32 (7.4 overs)

West Indies won by 8 wickets
Sharjah Cricket Stadium, Sharjah, UAE
Umpires: JW Holder (ENG) and DR Shepherd (ENG)
Player of the match: PV Simmons (WI)

- Sri Lanka won the toss and elected to bat.
- DP Samaraweera (SL) and RIC Holder (WI) made their ODI debuts.

=== Final ===
5 November 1993
Scorecard

Pakistan; 284/4 (50 overs)	v	West Indies; 285/4 (45.3 overs)
Basit Ali 127* (79); KCG Benjamin 1/37 (8 overs)		BC Lara 153 (143); Ata-ur-Rehman 2/43 (8 overs)

West Indies won by 6 wickets
Sharjah Cricket Stadium, Sharjah, UAE
Umpires: HD Bird (ENG) and DR Shepherd (ENG)
Player of the match: BC Lara (WI)

- West Indies won the toss and elected to field.

== See also ==
- Sharjah Cup
