= Gerry Gow =

Scottish footballer and manager

Personal information
- Date of birth: 29 May 1952
- Place of birth: Glasgow, Scotland
- Date of death: 10 October 2016 (aged 64)
- Position: Midfielder

Senior career*
| Years | Team | Apps | (Gls) |
| 1969–1980 | Bristol City | 375 | (48) |
| 1980–1981 | Manchester City | 26 | (5) |
| 1981–1983 | Rotherham United | 58 | (4) |
| 1983–1984 | Burnley | 9 | (0) |
| Total | | 459 | (57) |

International career
| 1974 | Scotland U23 | 1 | (0) |

Managerial career
- 1984–1987: Yeovil Town (player-manager)
- 1989–1990: Weymouth
- * Club domestic league appearances and goals

Gerald Gow (29 May 1952 – 10 October 2016) was a footballer who played for Bristol City in the 1970s, making 375 appearances for them in The Football League.

== Playing career ==
Gow made his debut for Bristol City in 1970 at the age of 17. He was a member of the side which achieved promotion in 1976 to the First Division. He left Bristol City aged 28 following the team's relegation to the Second Division in 1980.

After his time at Bristol City he played for Manchester City, appearing in the 1981 FA Cup final, and Rotherham United, before transferring to Burnley in August 1983. He then moved to Yeovil Town where he was player manager for a time.

Bristol City granted Gow a retrospective testimonial in 2012, when a Legends team played against a Manchester City Legends side.

== In popular culture ==
Gerry Gow is mentioned in the song 'This One's for Now' by the band Half Man Half Biscuit on their album Urge For Offal.

== Personal life ==
Gow's grandson is Dorking wanderers defender Brennan Camp.

== Death ==
He died of cancer on 10 October 2016 at the age of 64.

== Honours ==
Manchester City

- FA Cup runner-up: 1980–81
