= Dave Bennett (footballer, born 1959) =

English footballer

Personal information
- Full name: David Anthony Bennett
- Date of birth: 11 July 1959 (age 67)
- Place of birth: Manchester, England
- Height: 5 ft 9 in (1.75 m)
- Position: Winger

Senior career*
Years	Team	Apps	(Gls)
1978–1981	Manchester City	54	(9)
1981–1983	Cardiff City	76	(18)
1983–1989	Coventry City	172	(25)
1989–1990	Sheffield Wednesday	28	(0)
1990–1992	Swindon Town	1	(0)
1991	→ Shrewsbury Town (loan)	2	(2)
1992	Nuneaton Borough		
Total		333	(54)
- * Club domestic league appearances and goals

David Anthony Bennett (born 11 July 1959) is an English former professional footballer. He made over 200 appearances in the Football League during his career, including playing in two FA Cup Finals; 1981 for Manchester City, when he finished on the losing side, and 1987, when he produced a Man of the Match performance as Coventry City beat Tottenham Hotspur 3–2.

== Playing career ==
=== Manchester City ===
Bennett was born in Manchester and began his playing career with Manchester City, joining the club's youth side along with his brother Gary. He made his first senior appearance for them in the 1978–79 season during a 0–0 draw with Everton on 14 April 1979 as a substitute in place of Tommy Booth, and becoming a first team regular the following season. The following year, Bennett was used mostly as a backup but his performances in the team's progression to the semi-finals of the Football League Cup, scoring five times in the previous four matches, saw him selected for the 1981 FA Cup Final against Tottenham Hotspur.

Bennett himself admitted that his attitude had held him back, stating: "I've really battled hard in recent months, because there were times before when my attitude wasn't quite right." He assisted Tommy Hutchison for City's goal in the first match which ended in a 1–1 draw. He also won a penalty in the replay, having been fouled by Tottenham defender Paul Miller, but was unable to stop his side losing the replay 3–2. By playing in the final, Bennett became the first black player to represent City in an FA Cup final.

=== Cardiff City ===
In September 1981, he was sold to Second Division side Cardiff City following the signing of Martin O'Neill. His brother Gary also joined the Welsh club and the pair helped the Bluebirds win promotion back to the Second Division during the 1982–83 season. In two seasons at Ninian Park, he played 77 league games and scored 18 goals.

=== Coventry City ===
In July 1983, he returned to the First Division in a move to Coventry City. Five strong seasons followed, capped by an FA Cup winner's medal in 1987 when he scored Coventry's first goal and supplied the cross for Keith Houchen's classic headed goal in a man of the match performance for the Sky Blues as they achieved a shock 3–2 win over Tottenham Hotspur at Wembley. Coventry had gone into the match as underdogs but Bennett later stated: "The critics say we were the underdogs because Tottenham had all these international players [...] but we weren't afraid of them.

However, he broke his leg in March 1988 in a collision with Derby County goalkeeper Peter Shilton. Bennett did not return to action till New Year 1989, by this point having lost his place in the first team for the 1988–89 season to Michael Gynn. He played just seven times before transferring to their First Division rivals Sheffield Wednesday in March 1989. He had played a total of 172 league games for the Sky Blues, scoring 25 goals. He spent 18 months at Sheffield Wednesday, enduring their relegation to the Second Division at the end of the 1989–90 season,

Bennett is one of 30 former Coventry City players included in the Hall of Fame at the club's home, the Ricoh Arena, to which they relocated from Highfield Road in 2005.

=== Swindon Town ===
Bennett joined Swindon Town in September 1990 for a fee of £60,000. He was brought to the County Ground by manager Ossie Ardiles, who had ironically been his Tottenham nemesis in the FA Cup final only three years earlier. He made his debut in a 4–2 win over Oxford United, however, injury misery immediately followed, with Bennett breaking his leg in only his second match for the club, following a tackle from Gary Gill, during a Football League Trophy match against Darlington. After spending a year recovering, Bennett was loaned out to Shrewsbury Town to regain full match-fitness. Astonishingly, he broke the same leg, again in his second appearance for the club, effectively ending his professional career. He later played for non-league side Nuneaton Borough.

Dave Bennett worked for a time as a pundit and co-commentator for Free Radio 80s Coventry and Warwickshire, covering Sky Blues matches. He is now often heard in a similar role on BBC Coventry & Warwickshire.

== Honours ==
Manchester City

- FA Cup runner-up: 1980–81

Coventry City

- FA Cup: 1986–87

Individual

- Coventry City F.C. Hall of Fame
