= Ricardo Villa =

Argentine footballer (born 1952)

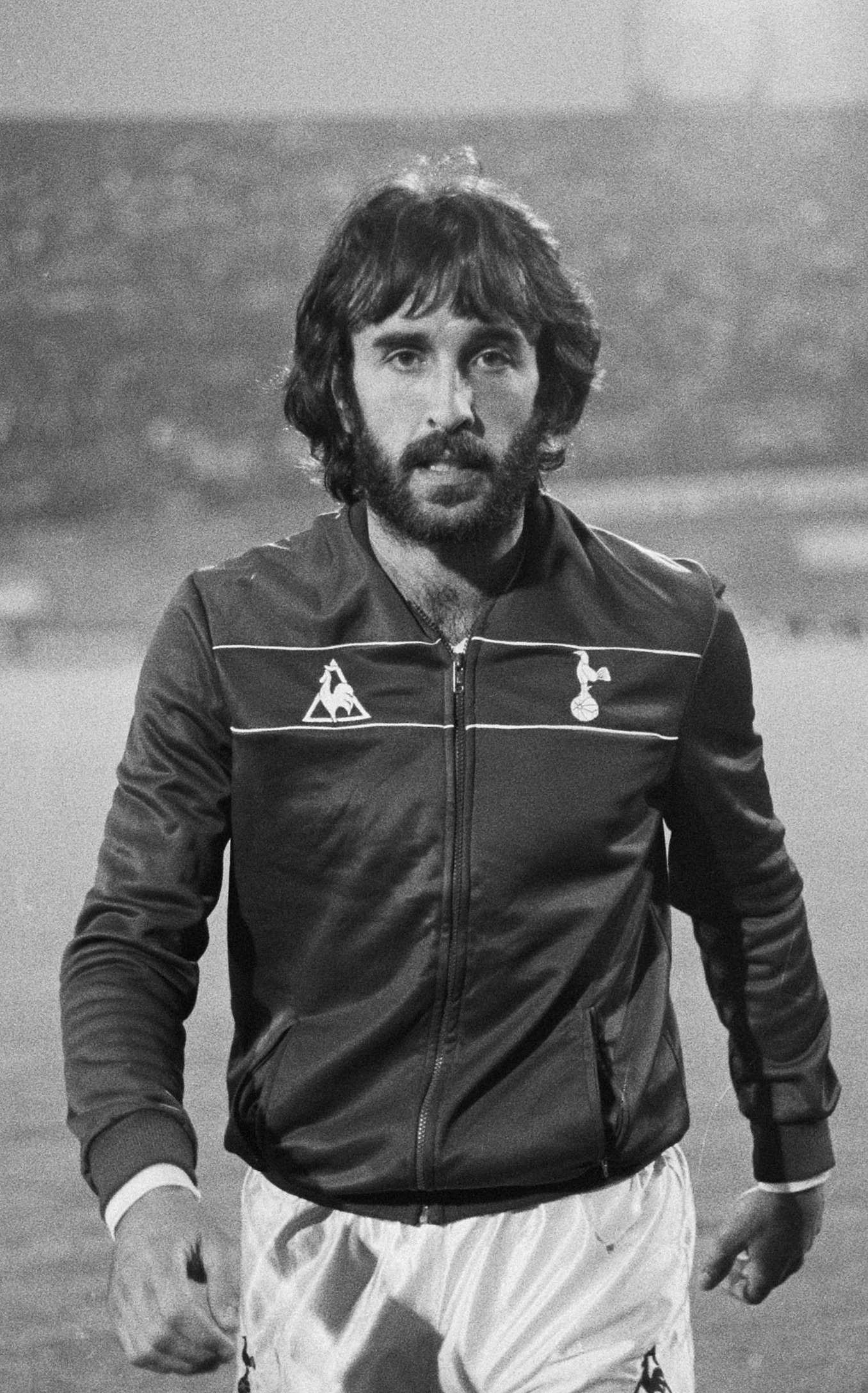
- Villa in 1981

Personal information
- Full name: Ricardo Julio Villa
- Date of birth: 18 August 1952 (age 74)
- Place of birth: Roque Pérez, Argentina
- Height: 1.85 m (6 ft 1 in)
- Position: Midfielder

Senior career*
Years	Team	Apps	(Gls)
1970–1974	Quilmes	108	(20)
1973	→San Martín de Tucumán (loan)	10	(3)
1974–1976	Atlético de Tucumán	51	(19)
1976–1978	Racing Club	52	(6)
1978–1983	Tottenham Hotspur	133	(18)
1983	Fort Lauderdale Strikers	19	(3)
1984–1985	Deportivo Cali	0	(0)
1986–1989	Defensa y Justicia	93	(4)
Total		466	(73)

International career
1975–1978	Argentina	17	(1)

Managerial career
- 1998–1999: Defensa y Justicia
- 2012: Defensa y Justicia
Medal record
Representing Argentina
FIFA World Cup
Winner	1978 Argentina	Team
- * Club domestic league appearances and goals

Ricardo Julio Villa ([riˈkaɾðo ˈβiʝa]; born 18 August 1952), more commonly known as Ricky Villa, is an Argentine football coach and former professional midfielder. He was famous for his time playing football from 1970 to 1989.

== Career ==
Villa was born in Roque Pérez, Buenos Aires. In the 1970s he played successively for Quilmes, Atlético de Tucumán and Racing Club. At the 1978 FIFA World Cup, he was a member of the Argentine team that won the tournament and made two appearances as a substitute in the second round. Afterwards, he was snapped up by Tottenham Hotspur's Keith Burkinshaw together with Ossie Ardiles.

Arriving to a ticker tape welcome at White Hart Lane, Villa scored against Nottingham Forest on his debut at the City Ground. Villa scored a total of 25 goals in 179 Spurs appearances, including his winning goal against Manchester City in the 1981 FA Cup Final replay – for which he won the Wembley goal of the century award in 2001. He had also opened the scoring in the 8th minute of that final replay. He was withdrawn from the 1982 FA Cup Final Tottenham team, due to the outbreak of the Falklands Conflict.

Villa played on in Argentina, Colombia and the United States before ending his career in the lower leagues of Argentine football with Defensa y Justicia.

Villa also represented Argentina in the 1991 edition of the World Cup of Masters, scoring in the opening round against England.

He dedicated himself to politics during the 1990s, but since July 2005 has been the technical secretary of Talleres de Córdoba. He resides in Villa Carlos Paz with his wife and four children. As of November 2007, it was announced by FIFA that all members of winning World Cup squads prior to 1982 would receive World Cup winners medals and this includes Villa as part of the 1978 World Cup winning squad.

On 7 February 2008, Villa along with his compatriot Ossie Ardiles were inducted into the Tottenham Hotspur Hall of Fame.

== Honours ==
Atlético Tucumán

- Torneo Regional Federación Tucumana: 1975

Tottenham Hotspur

- FA Cup: 1980–81
- FA Charity Shield: 1981 (shared)
- Football League Cup runner-up: 1981–82

Argentina

- FIFA World Cup: 1978

Individual

- Tottenham Hotspur Hall of fame
