= Tommy Caton =

English footballer (1962–1993)

Personal information
- Full name: Thomas Stephen Caton
- Date of birth: 6 October 1962
- Place of birth: Kirkby, England
- Date of death: 30 April 1993 (aged 30)
- Place of death: Bampton, Oxfordshire, England
- Height: 6 ft 2 in (1.88 m)
- Position: Central defender

Youth career
- 1978–1979: Manchester City

Senior career*
Years	Team	Apps	(Gls)
1979–1983	Manchester City	165	(8)
1983–1987	Arsenal	81	(2)
1987–1988	Oxford United	53	(3)
1988–1991	Charlton Athletic	57	(5)
Total		356	(18)

International career
1977–1978	England Schoolboys	10	(0)
1979–1980	England Youth	4	(0)
1981–1984	England U21	14	(0)
- * Club domestic league appearances and goals

Thomas Stephen Caton (6 October 1962 – 30 April 1993) was an English footballer who played as a centre half for Manchester City, Arsenal, Oxford United and Charlton Athletic. Caton captained both Manchester City and Oxford United and was named as City's Player of the Year in 1982.

He made 14 appearances for the England under-21 team.

== Career ==
=== Manchester City ===
Born in Kirkby, Lancashire, Caton was a centre half who played for and captained England schoolboys before signing for Manchester City as an apprentice in 1978. He was a member of the City team that reached and lost in the 1979 and 1980 FA Youth Cup finals. Caton made his senior debut for City on 18 August 1979 aged 16, and soon became a regular in the City side, playing in the 1981 FA Cup Final against Tottenham Hotspur when still only 18 years old. When Tommy Hutchison put City in the lead it looked as though Caton was on his way to collect a winner's medal, but Tottenham levelled as a result of Hutchison's own goal, a replay was forced and City lost it 3–2.

He reached 100 First Division games on 6 March 1982; at the age of 19 years and 5 months he was the youngest player in Football League history to achieve this feat. He was also named City's Player of the Year for 1981–82. Caton scored eight goals during his spell at Maine Road, the first one coming in a 1–1 draw at Nottingham Forest on 13 March 1982, and he scored twice against Arsenal on 4 December 1982. He scored his last goal for City in a 3–1 win against Shrewsbury Town at Gay Meadow on 5 November 1983.

A season after he came close to collecting an FA Cup winner's medal, Caton was looking like a good bet for a Football League First Division title winner's medal as City went top of the league just after Christmas in 1981, but a dismal second half of the season meant they finished mid table and were left without even a UEFA Cup place. The lacklustre form continued into the 1982–83 season, at the end of which City were beaten 1–0 at home on the final day of the season by Luton Town, meaning that City were relegated and Luton stayed up. Caton was unwilling to remain at City now they were a Second Division club, and handed in a transfer request, but began the 1983–84 season still playing for the Citizens and he remained there until December 1983 when he made the move to Arsenal for £500,000.

=== Arsenal ===
Caton made his Arsenal debut against West Bromwich Albion on 4 December. However, after playing as a first team regular under the management of Don Howe in his first two years at Arsenal as David O'Leary's partner, he lost his place to teenagers Martin Keown and Tony Adams during the 1985–86 season, at the end of which Howe was replaced by George Graham. By February 1987, Caton had scored three goals in 95 appearances for Arsenal, but had not played first-team football in almost a year.

=== Oxford United ===
In February 1987, Caton was sold to Oxford United for £160,000. He was named club captain soon after his arrival and helped them avoid relegation from the First Division during his opening months at the Manor Ground. He also missed out on a chance of silverware when Oxford were knocked out in the semifinals of the 1987–88 League Cup.

=== Charlton Athletic ===
He remained at Oxford until 18 November 1988, when he was sold to Charlton Athletic for £100,000 in order to play in the First Division again. Caton stayed with Charlton after their relegation in 1990, but was injured the following January and never played first team football again. He finally announced his retirement in March 1993 having failed to make a full recovery. He had played 57 league games for Charlton, scoring five goals.

== Personal life ==
Caton was born in Kirkby, Lancashire. He was married to Gill, and had three children. His son Andy also played League football. At the age of 30, a month after he announced his retirement, Caton suddenly died of a heart attack at home in Oxfordshire.

== Honours ==
Manchester City

- FA Youth Cup runner-up: 1978–79, 1979–80
- FA Cup runner-up: 1980–81

England Under-21

- UEFA Under-21 European Championship: 1982

Individual

- Manchester City Player of the Year: 1982
