= Shoot (football magazine) =

English football magazine

- Cover of the 50th-anniversary edition in 2019
- Categories: Sport
- Frequency: Weekly
- First issue: 16 August 1969
- Final issue: 28 June 2008
- Country: England
- Based in: London, England
- Language: English
- Website: Official Shoot website

Shoot (often written Shoot!), or Shoot Monthly, was a football magazine published in Britain between 1969 and 2008. It later became a monthly, before reverting to a weekly, and is now in digital form only, via a website.

== Content ==
Each edition featured a two-page colour centrefold photo of a team, and several other glossy colour photographs of players from the top teams, usually but not exclusively in the First Division and, later, the Premier League. The magazine also had a "Focus On" feature that, along with the colour photo of a player, asked him to reveal some basic biographical information as well as some personal information, such as his favourite entertainer or his least favourite opponent.

The magazine was also known for its "Star Writer" features. Each season, a selection of big-name First Division players, including Alan Ball, Billy Bremner, Kenny Dalglish, Kevin Keegan, Bryan Robson and Charlie Nicholas, wrote (or had ghost-written for them) columns on their football lives. This feature continued in the monthly incarnation of the magazine, with stars including Joe Cole and Danny Mills penning regular columns.

The magazine also featured Paul Trevillion's You Are The Ref comic strip for many years. This strip was collected in book form in 2006.

=== League ladders ===
The weekly magazine featured annual free gifts of "Shoot League Ladders". These consisted of a thin cardboard sheet on which was printed slitted league tables for all the divisions of the Football League and Scottish League. Included in the package were tabs for all the teams, printed in the teams' colours, which could be fitted into the slits to reflect every team's position in the standings. As the season progressed and teams moved up and down the table, their tabs could be adjusted accordingly. Old league ladders are still regularly sold on eBay.

== History ==
In the 1970s, Shoot merged with a rival publication, Goal, and for a while was sold as Shoot/Goal. Shoot's circulation hit a high of 120,000 copies per week in 1996. It changed to a monthly magazine in 2001, selling in excess of 33,000 copies a month. It was relaunched as a weekly magazine in late February 2008, before publishers IPC sold off the brand in August 2008. Pedigree Toys and Brands have licensed the brand since that date and have produced special editions of the magazine, plus an on-line version. In June 2011, it launched an app version. They also produce the Shoot Annual and a number of other Shoot publications and branded products.

There were no issues for six weeks from 17 May to 21 June 1980, or for five weeks from 30 June to 28 July 1984, due to industrial action. When the magazine ran as a weekly, occasional 'double issues' were produced, particularly for the Christmas/New Year issue.
