= Kevin Reeves =

English footballer (born 1957)

Personal information
- Full name: Kevin Philip Reeves
- Date of birth: 20 October 1957 (age 69)
- Place of birth: Burley, Hampshire, England
- Position: Forward

Team information
- Current team: Everton (Head Scout)

Youth career
- AFC Bournemouth

Senior career*
Years	Team	Apps	(Gls)
1974–1977	AFC Bournemouth	63	(20)
1977–1980	Norwich City	119	(37)
1980–1983	Manchester City	130	(34)
1983–1984	Burnley	21	(12)
Total		370	(103)

International career
1976	England Youth	1	(0)
1978–1980	England U21	10	(2)
1979–1981	England B	3	(0)
1979–1980	England	2	(0)
- * Club domestic league appearances and goals

Kevin Philip Reeves (born 20 October 1957) is an English football coach and scout, and former professional player who played as a forward, scoring 103 goals from 333 appearances in the Football League playing for AFC Bournemouth, Norwich City, Manchester City and Burnley. He was capped twice by England at full international level. On 4 July 2013, he became Everton's head scout, a post he no longer holds in 2023.

== Career ==
Reeves was born in Burley, Hampshire, and started his career as an apprentice with AFC Bournemouth. He made his League debut in the 1974–75 season, and played 63 games before John Bond signed him for Norwich City in January 1977 for a fee of £50,000. After 133 games and 42 goals in all competitions, he earned Norwich their first £1 million fee when he was transferred to Manchester City in March 1980 for £1.25m. Reeves scored 39 goals from 158 appearances in all competitions, including a penalty in City's defeat at the hands of Tottenham Hotspur in the 1981 FA Cup final replay. He subsequently played for Burnley, continuing his trend of playing under John Bond, but was forced to retire from the professional game at the age of 26 because of a hip injury.

He also made ten appearances for England Under-21, three for England B, and two for England at senior level.

Reeves later coached under Bond at Burnley and Birmingham City, teamed up with Brian Flynn as his assistant manager at both Wrexham and Swansea City, and scouted for clubs including Stoke City and latterly Swansea City, Wigan Athletic and Everton as a member of Roberto Martínez' backroom staff.

== Honours ==
Manchester City

- FA Cup runner-up: 1980–81
