= Tony Henry (footballer, born 1957) =

English footballer

Personal information
- Full name: Anthony Henry
- Date of birth: 26 November 1957 (age 68)
- Place of birth: Houghton-le-Spring, England
- Height: 5 ft 11 in (1.80 m)
- Position: Midfielder

Senior career*
Years	Team	Apps	(Gls)
1976–1981	Manchester City	79	(6)
1981–1982	Bolton Wanderers	70	(22)
1982–1987	Oldham Athletic	190	(25)
1987–1989	Stoke City	62	(11)
1989–1991	Mazda		
1991–1992	Shrewsbury Town	40	(7)
1993–1994	Witton Albion	19	(0)
1994–1997	TNS Llansantffraid	34	(6)
Total		494	(77)
- * Club domestic league appearances and goals

Anthony Henry (born 26 November 1957) is an English association football administrator and former footballer who played in the Football League for Bolton Wanderers, Manchester City, Oldham Athletic, Shrewsbury Town and Stoke City.

== Career ==
Born in Houghton-le-Spring, Henry began his career with Manchester City and made his professional debut against Wolverhampton Wanderers in 1977. As a young player Henry found it difficult to break into a side packed with more established young players such as Gary Owen and also internationals such as Dave Watson and Asa Hartford which had been consistently challenging for major honours. It was not before March 1979 that Henry got an extended run in the side with the team had been struggling in the bottom half of the league table though progress had been made in the UEFA Cup where a 5–2 aggregate third round victory over AC Milan had set up a tie with Borussia Mönchengladbach. Though a 3–1 defeat sent City out of the competition Henry kept his place for the trip to Arsenal four days later and was to miss only one further game until the end of the 1980–81 season, making a total of 15 appearances.

The style of football Malcolm Allison wanted to play suited Henry's ability as a utility player, being able to play across the midfield and also at full-back if need be, and his first goals for Manchester City soon followed as he scored both in a 2–1 League Cup replay win at home to Sheffield Wednesday in early September. Two months later he got his first league goal for the club when he opened the scoring in a 2–0 derby match win over Manchester United, the goal for which he is best-remembered for by the supporters. Three wins out of the last four games saw them finish in seventeenth place, Henry scoring in a 2–1 win on the last day against Ipswich to bring his tally to 4 goals from 32 appearances. Henry lost his place in the team the following season as the poor league form from the previous term continued, Malcolm Allison was sacked and replaced by John Bond. He immediately brought in a number of experienced players, with Henry losing his place in the team. In the League Cup he had hit a rich vein of form, helping the side reach the semi-final only to be defeated by Liverpool. Henry played as a substitute in the 1981 FA Cup final.

Henry was sold to Bolton Wanderers in 1981 for a fee of £120,000. He spent two seasons at Burnden Park scoring 20 goals in 70 matches for the "Trotters". He then went on to Oldham Athletic where he enjoyed what was the most successful time of his career making almost 200 appearances for the "Latics". In December 1987 Henry signed for Stoke City and instantly established himself in Mick Mills' first team playing in every match until the end of the 1987–88 season. He was again a regular in 1988–89 playing in 48 games as Stoke finished in a disappointing 13th. At the end of the season Henry decided to move to Japan to play for Mazda before ending his career with Shrewsbury Town and then Welsh League side TNS Llansantffraid. During his spell with the club he was also manager, and was sacked by the club's chairman wearing a towel after a match.

== Scouting ==
After his retirement from football, Henry continued to work within the game as a scout. He was chief scout at Chelsea, Sunderland and then Everton, before taking up the role of director of player recruitment at West Ham United in 2014.

On 1 February 2018, Henry was suspended from his role at West Ham following a report in the Daily Mail. The report alleged that he had told agents that the club did not want to sign any more African players as they "cause mayhem" when they don't play, citing the recently departed Diafra Sakho as an example. A club statement confirmed the suspension "pending a full and thorough investigation". The following day, the club announced that his contract had been terminated. In July 2018, Henry was banned from football for 12 months by the Football Association after admitting misconduct.

== Career statistics ==
Club	Season	League			FA Cup		League Cup		Other^{[A]}		Total	
Club	Season	Division	Apps	Goals	Apps	Goals	Apps	Goals	Apps	Goals	Apps	Goals
Manchester City	1975–76	First Division	0	0	0	0	0	0	1	0	1	0
Manchester City	1976–77	First Division	2	0	0	0	0	0	0	0	2	0
Manchester City	1977–78	First Division	1	0	0	0	0	0	0	0	1	0
Manchester City	1978–79	First Division	15	0	0	0	0	0	1	0	16	0
Manchester City	1979–80	First Division	32	4	1	0	1	0	0	0	34	4
Manchester City	1980–81	First Division	27	2	3	0	7	4	0	0	37	4
Manchester City	1981–82	First Division	2	0	0	0	0	0	0	0	2	0
Manchester City	Total		79	6	4	0	8	4	2	0	93	10
Bolton Wanderers	1981–82	Second Division	39	13	2	0	0	0	–		41	13
Bolton Wanderers	1982–83	Second Division	31	9	1	0	3	2	–		35	11
Bolton Wanderers	Total		70	22	3	0	3	2	0	0	76	24
Oldham Athletic	1982–83	Second Division	11	1	0	0	0	0	–		11	1
Oldham Athletic	1983–84	Second Division	42	4	1	0	2	0	–		45	4
Oldham Athletic	1984–85	Second Division	40	3	2	0	2	1	–		44	4
Oldham Athletic	1985–86	Second Division	40	7	0	0	2	0	–		42	7
Oldham Athletic	1986–87	Second Division	36	6	2	0	1	0	3	0	42	6
Oldham Athletic	1987–88	Second Division	21	4	0	0	5	0	1	0	27	4
Oldham Athletic	Total		190	25	5	0	12	1	4	0	211	26
Stoke City	1987–88	Second Division	22	5	2	0	0	0	–		24	5
Stoke City	1988–89	Second Division	40	6	3	0	2	0	1	0	46	6
Stoke City	Total		62	11	5	0	2	0	1	0	70	11
Shrewsbury Town	1991–92	Third Division	40	7	0	0	4	0	1	0	45	7
Career Total			441	71	17	0	29	7	8	0	495	78

A. The "Other" column constitutes appearances and goals in the Anglo-Scottish Cup, Football League play-offs Football League Trophy and Full Members Cup.
