= Steve MacKenzie =

English footballer and manager

Personal information
- Full name: Stephen MacKenzie
- Date of birth: 23 November 1961 (age 64)
- Place of birth: Romford, England
- Height: 5 ft 10 in (1.78 m)
- Position: Midfielder

Youth career
- Crystal Palace

Senior career*
| Years | Team | Apps | (Gls) |
| 1979–1981 | Manchester City | 58 | (8) |
| 1981–1987 | West Bromwich Albion | 156 | (23) |
| 1987–1990 | Charlton Athletic | 100 | (7) |
| 1990–1992 | Sheffield Wednesday | 15 | (2) |
| 1992–1994 | Shrewsbury Town | 24 | (1) |
| 1994–? | Willenhall Town | | |
| 2004 | Gresley Rovers | 1 | (1) |
| Total | | 354 | (42) |

International career
| 1979–1980 | England Youth | 15 | (4) |
| 1981–1982 | England U21 | 3 | (0) |
| 1981–1989 | England B | 2 | (0) |

Managerial career
- 2000–2002: Atherstone United
- * Club domestic league appearances and goals

Stephen MacKenzie (born 23 November 1961) is an English former footballer who played mostly as an attacking midfielder.

== Playing career ==
After beginning as an apprentice at Crystal Palace, he signed for Manchester City in 1979 for £250,000, then a record for a teenager. The move attracted considerable attention because MacKenzie had yet to play a Football League match. He spent two seasons at Maine Road, and his second season coincided with the replacement of Malcolm Allison with John Bond and an upturn in fortunes. He gained renown for scoring spectacular goals, most notably in the 1981 FA Cup Final replay against Tottenham Hotspur.

He moved to West Bromwich Albion and spent six seasons at the Hawthorns before joining Charlton Athletic. He later played for Sheffield Wednesday and Shrewsbury Town, and had a spell managing non-league Atherstone United.

He is a cousin of former Arsenal and England captain, Tony Adams.

== Honours ==
Manchester City

- FA Cup runner-up: 1980–81

England U21

- UEFA European Under-21 Championship: 1982
