= Ray Ranson =

English footballer

Personal information
- Full name: Raymond Ranson
- Date of birth: 12 June 1960 (age 66)
- Place of birth: St Helens, England
- Height: 5 ft 9 in (1.75 m)
- Position: Defender

Youth career
- 1976–1978: Manchester City

Senior career*
Years	Team	Apps	(Gls)
1978–1984	Manchester City	184	(1)
1984–1988	Birmingham City	137	(0)
1988–1993	Newcastle United	83	(1)
1993	Manchester City	17	(0)
1993–1995	Reading	24	(0)
Total		445	(2)

International career
1975	England Schoolboys	9	(0)
1977–1978	England Youth	6	(0)
1979–1982	England U21	11	(0)
- * Club domestic league appearances and goals

Raymond Ranson (born 12 June 1960) is an English sports entrepreneur and former professional footballer.

== Playing career ==
Born in St Helens, Merseyside, Ranson's professional football career began in 1976 when he was signed as an apprentice by Manchester City. Typically playing as a defender at right full-back, he made his senior debut in a 0–0 draw against Nottingham Forest on 23 December 1978.

Over a 17-year career between 1978 and 1995, Ranson amassed 445 professional league appearances Manchester City, Newcastle United, Birmingham City and Reading. He also represented England at various levels including schoolboy, youth and the England national under-21 football team.

Ranson was part of the Manchester City team that reached the 1981 FA Cup final. It was the centenary edition of The Football Association Challenge Cup, the leading annual knockout competition in men's domestic English football.

Ranson was a member of the England team that won the 1982 UEFA European Under-21 Championship, sealing a 5-4 aggregate victory over West Germany in the finals.

In November 1984 Ranson signed with Birmingham City. He was a part of the squad that won promotion to the First Division in 1985, and would make 137 first team appearances for the club over four years.

In 1988, Ranson joined Newcastle United, making 83 league appearances for the club.

== Business career ==
Ranson started his second career in sports finance and insurance while still playing football professionally. In 1990, he formed an insurance broker that created the first ever personal accident scheme for the Professional Footballers' Association, the union for all current and former footballers across the English Football Leagues.

After ending his professional playing career in 1995, Ranson formed a joint venture with The Benfield Group, which later became Benfield Greig, an independent reinsurance and risk intermediary company founded by Chelsea director Matthew Harding. While at the company, Ranson developed a range of innovative sports contingency and personal accident insurance products for the professional sports industry. Ranson departed Benfield Greig shortly before the organization listed on the London Stock Exchange in 2003.

In 1998, Ranson became an advisor to Registered European Football Finance, a Guernsey-based captive insurance company with institutional backers including Barclays. The company funded more than £150 million of football player transfers for professional clubs on a sale and leaseback basis, managing the principal and interest payments on a quarterly basis over a player's contract duration.

In 2004, Ranson formed Prozone Sports Ltd, a market-leading performance analysis platform that supplied analytics to prominent professional clubs including F.C. Barcelona, Manchester United, Liverpool F.C. and Arsenal F.C. Ranson sold the business to Sport Universal Process in 2011 for an undisclosed sum before it eventually became a part of STATS Perform.

In the same year, Ranson formed a consortium that made an unsuccessful £30 million bid for Aston Villa. Ranson made a second offer in 2005, this time for £45 million, which was also rejected.

In 2006, Ranson formed Sports Asset Management, a firm that provided access to professional sports-related investments, including stakes of professional players' contracts and specialty insurance against career-ending injuries.

In April 2007, Ranson submitted an undisclosed bid to acquire Manchester City F.C., the first team he had played for professionally in 1978. Ranson would withdraw the offer after failing to reach an agreement with the club's board of directors.

In October 2007, Ranson led a £40 million offer to take over Southampton F.C. on behalf of SISU Capital, an investment management company. The directors of Southampton Leisure Holdings PLC, the club's parent company, voted 5–2 in favor of accepting the deal, until the proposals were rejected by three major shareholders.

In December 2007, Ranson completed a deal to take over Coventry City F.C. on behalf of SISU Capital, which saved the club from entering administration and incurring a 10-point deduction. As part of the transaction, Ranson was installed as Coventry City's new chairman. SISU Capital also signed a cooperation agreement with Arena Coventry Limited (ACL), owners of the Ricoh Arena, that would allow Coventry City to continue using the stadium as their home ground. Ranson would step down from the role in 2011, with former Southampton chairman Ken Dulieu replacing him.

In 2015, Ranson and launched the London Sport Exchange, an online marketplace designed to connect alternative investors with professional sports-related investment and opportunities. Ranson opened the site to institutional investors in 2017 before selling the platform to private equity investors in 2019.

In 2024, Ranson formed CoverSport as a Guernsey-based, full-stack digital insurer with a peer-to-peer marketplace for the issuance, trading, clearing and settlement of parametric insurance contracts that provide for a payment on the outcome of a specified sporting event.

== Honours ==
Manchester City

- FA Cup runner-up: 1980–81

Reading

- Football League Second Division: 1993–94
