= Paul Trevillion =

Britist sports artist

- Born: 11 March 1934 (age 92); Tottenham, North London, England
- Occupation: Sports artist

Paul Trevillion (born 11 March 1934) is a British sports artist, whose career spans over seventy years.

Born in Tottenham, North London, Trevillion produced artwork for publications like Eagle while still at school, from the 1960s to the 1980s. Trevillion designed and illustrated pieces for Daily Mirror, Daily Express, The Sun, The Daily Telegraph, The Times, and TV Century 21 and in 2006 revived his cult football cartoon You Are The Ref - made famous by football magazine Shoot! in the 1970s - for The Observer. A book collecting 50 years of You Are The Ref was published in October 2006. From August 2008, You Are The Ref appeared online at guardian.co.uk.

Trevillion, who spent much of the 1960s in the US working with Mark McCormack at IMG for some of the world's biggest brands, is the author and illustrator of over 20 books which have sold worldwide. He also illustrated the famous Gary Player Golf Class which appeared in over 300 newspapers worldwide.

He has met and drawn sports people including Pelé, Bobby Moore, George Best, Franz Beckenbauer, Jack Nicklaus, Tiger Woods, Michael Jordan, Sugar Ray Robinson and Oscar De La Hoya. As a young man, he also met and drew British Prime Minister Winston Churchill.

He worked as a stand-up comedian, supporting the likes of Norman Wisdom and Bob Monkhouse, had a record deal, as the world's Best Worst Singer, was crowned world speed-kissing champion, and invented the 'Pencil Grip' split-handed golf putting technique. He was also the inspiration behind an attempt to boost Leeds United's image in the 1970s. Hired by Don Revie in 1972, his ideas included wearing numbered sock tags (which were subsequently thrown into the crowd as souvenirs) and synchronised warm-ups.

In 2008, Trevillion was interviewed in the documentary "Roy", about the life and times of Roy of the Rovers: a character Trevillion illustrated in the 1950s. The film was shown at the 2009 Cannes Film Festival.

In 2011, Trevillion was short-listed for the prestigious Sports Journalists' Association Cartoonist of the Year Award. Marking this feat at the age of 75, his long-time colleague Norman Giller commented in a tribute on the SJA website: "To describe Paul as a cartoonist is to trivialize a career dedicated to producing outstanding art."

In 2022, he was the subject of the authorised biographical book “Paul The Beaver Trevillion – The Story Of Sock Tags And Self-Belief”. In it, Trevillion told writer and journalist Neil Jeffries his life story from wartime North London to becoming a widely respected artist and marketing person. The illustrated hardback reveals, in particular, how in 1972 he approached the then Leeds United manager Don Revie – convincing him and the players that he could give Leeds United a change of image that would earn them much more favourable press coverage and make them one of the world's most famous teams. Among his adopted suggestions were sock-tags, adding players' names to the backs of their tracksuits and pre-match warm-up routines. These and many other unique marketing ploys saw players engage directly with fans. In this book, Trevillion also tells of his role in creating the squad's Top 20 FA Cup final single that became the club's anthem, “Marching On Together”, still sung by fans at the team's matches today.

== Books ==
- Trevillion, Paul (2006). Hills, David (ed.). You Are the Ref: 50 Years of the Cult Classic Cartoon Strip. Bloomsbury Publishing Plc. ISBN 9780852650691.
- Trevillion, Paul (1996). Missing Impossible: Trevillion's Method of Perfect Putting. Pelham. ISBN 9780720720600.
- Trevillion, Paul; Holder, John (2009). Hills, David; Richards, Giles (eds.). You Are the Umpire: The Ultimate Illustrated Guide to the Laws of Cricket. Random House. ISBN 9780852650776.
- Trevillion, Paul (2022). Jeffries, Neil (ed.). Paul The Beaver Trevillion – The Story Of Sock Tags And Self-Belief. Scratching Shed Publishing. ISBN 978-1838489922.
