= Paul Power =

English footballer

Personal information
- Date of birth: 30 October 1953 (age 73)
- Place of birth: Openshaw, Manchester, England
- Height: 5 ft 11 in (1.80 m)
- Position: Left back

Senior career*
Years	Team	Apps	(Gls)
1975–1986	Manchester City	365	(26)
1986–1988	Everton	54	(6)
Total		419	(32)

International career
1981	England B	1	(0)
- * Club domestic league appearances and goals

Paul Power (born 30 October 1953) is an English retired professional footballer. He played both in defence and midfield and played for Manchester City between 1975 and 1986.

== Career ==
He played in 447 games for the team scoring 36 goals before transferring to Everton where he was a key figure in their First Division title win in the 1986-87 Football League season. He scored against City at Maine Road on Saturday 29 November 1986.

During his time at Maine Road he also earned one cap for the England 'B' team. He was named player of the year for the team in both the 1980–81 season and in the 1984–85 season. He led City out at Wembley three times but never appeared in a winning team. In his first player of the year winning season, City went to Wembley to play Tottenham Hotspur in the 100th FA Cup Final.

He scored in all bar two of the rounds in the competition that season, the fifth round match against Peterborough United and the Wembley games against Spurs being the two. His 100th minute free-kick against Ipswich Town at Villa Park was significant. In the 1984–85 season, he led City to promotion under Billy McNeill, beating Charlton Athletic 5–1 at Maine Road on Saturday 11 May 1985.

He finished his career signing for Everton in June 1986 for a fee of £65,000. He played in a total of 52 games in the 1986-87 season, winning the league title, and earning a major trophy in his 34th year.

His first team chances were more limited in the 1987-88 season, when Everton finished fourth under new manager Colin Harvey after the departure of Howard Kendall to Atletico Bilbao, and at the end of the season he retired to join the club's coaching staff. However, he was axed by the club in November 1990 when Howard Kendall took over as manager for the second time.

He later returned to Manchester City, working in the academy.

== Honours ==
=== As a player ===
Manchester City

- FA Cup runner-up: 1980–81
- Full Members' Cup runner-up: 1985–86

Everton

- Football League First Division: 1986–87
- FA Charity Shield: 1986 (shared), 1987
