= Tommy Hutchison =

Scottish footballer and manager

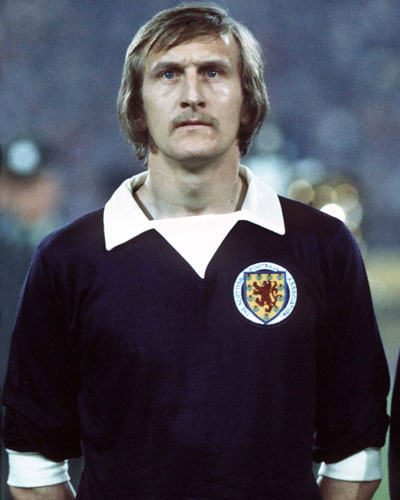

Personal information
- Full name: Thomas Hutchison
- Date of birth: 22 September 1947 (age 79)
- Place of birth: Cardenden, Scotland
- Height: 5 ft 11 1/2 in (1.82 m)
- Position: Midfielder

Senior career*
Years	Team	Apps	(Gls)
–1965	Dundonald Bluebell		
1965–1968	Alloa Athletic	68	(4)
1968–1972	Blackpool	165	(10)
1972–1980	Coventry City	314	(24)
1980	→ Seattle Sounders (loan)	25	(3)
1980–1982	Manchester City	46	(4)
1982–1983	Bulova	22	(0)
1983–1985	Burnley	92	(4)
1985–1991	Swansea City	178	(9)
1991–1994	Merthyr Tydfil	73	(2)
Total		983	(60)

International career
1971	Scotland U23	1	(0)
1973–1975	Scotland	17	(1)

Managerial career
- 1985–1986: Swansea City
- * Club domestic league appearances and goals

Thomas Hutchison (born 22 September 1947) is a Scottish former footballer who played as a midfielder.

He made over 1,150 appearances (the first Scot to achieve the feat, since the time matches are recorded), including 314 in the Football League alone for Coventry City, and more than 160 apiece in the competition for Blackpool and Swansea City (serving the latter as manager for a season before resuming as a player, which continued into his mid-40s), plus shorter spells in the United States and Hong Kong.

Hutchison gained 17 caps for Scotland between 1973 and 1975.

== Club career ==
Born in Cardenden, Fife, Hutchison began his professional career with Alloa Athletic in the Scottish Second Division, after he was spotted by manager Archie McPherson. He showed enough potential to attract the attention of larger clubs, and he joined Stan Mortensen's Blackpool in February 1968 for just over £10,000. Almost immediately, he took the place of Graham Oates at outside-left, making his debut against Plymouth on 30 March in the English Second Division.

The Scot was brought in to bolster the Seasiders' flagging promotion drive, and out of the final nine games of the 1967–68 season, they won eight. Promotion, however, was missed on the final day.

Les Shannon took over from Mortensen as manager, and in his first season achieved promotion to the First Division in 1970 – but it only lasted one season. When Bob Stokoe took over from Shannon in June 1971, he worked on Hutchison's crossing ability, believing it to be his only weak spot.

In 1972, Coventry City manager Joe Mercer offered £140,000 cash plus Billy Rafferty for Hutchison's services. He signed for the Midlands club, leaping at the chance to play in the First Division on a regular basis. 'Hutch' remained at Highfield Road for eight years, playing 355 games and scoring 30 goals. During his time at Coventry he played probably the best football of his career, winning all of his 17 Scottish caps while at the club. Nicknamed "Mr Magic" by the club chairman, Derrick Robins, he was voted supporter's Player of the Season three times during his eight-year spell at Highfield Road – a feat no other Sky Blues player has yet equalled.

Hutchison joined Manchester City for a fee of £47,000 in October 1980, becoming John Bond's first signing at Maine Road. In May 1981, he scored for both sides in the FA Cup Final, as Tottenham Hotspur drew 1–1 with Manchester City. He was not the first to do this — Bert Turner had done so in the 1946 final for Charlton and Derby, and Gary Mabbutt would do the same in the 1987 final for Coventry City and Tottenham Hotspur. He had initially put City in the lead, but his own goal (deflecting a free-kick) meant that the final would go to a replay, which City lost 3–2 five days later.

Hutchison later played for Bulova of Hong Kong and Seattle Sounders (US) before returning to the UK, re-joining John Bond at Burnley in 1983 and moving to Swansea City in 1985 to be managed by Bond at a third different club in his career. When Bond departed, Hutchison served as manager for six months after the club went into liquidation. Come September 1989, Hutchison – now just shy of his 42nd birthday – made his debut in European club competition. Having won the Welsh FA Cup the season before, Swansea entered the UEFA Cup Winner's Cup, and were drawn against Greek giants Panathinaikos. They were eliminated at the First Round stage, but not before giving the Greek team a scare losing 3–2 in Athens and drawing 3–3 at Vetch Field. He is in the record books as the oldest player to have played for Swansea City, playing against Southend United in March 1991 at the age of 43 years, five months and 19 days.

In late-May and early-June 1984, Hutchison made three guest appearances for Manchester United on their summer tour of Australia, playing against Australia, Nottingham Forest and Juventus. He then made another guest appearance for the club the following May, when he played in Peter Foley's testimonial against an Oxford United XI.

He left Swansea near the end of the 1990–91 season, and joined Southern League side Merthyr Tydfil, where he spent another three years before finally retiring from the game in May 1994, at the age of 46, having played more than a thousand first-team games in his career.

== International career ==
Capped 17 times for Scotland, Hutchison appeared at the 1974 World Cup, though was surprisingly omitted from the 1978 World Cup squad in Argentina when he was arguably playing the finest football of his career.

== Retirement ==
After his retirement from playing, Hutchison remained in South Wales until 2012, working as a Football Development Officer across the Severn Estuary for Bristol City. He later moved back to live in Scotland. A poll by the Coventry Evening Telegraph voted him the most popular Coventry player of the club's First Division era.

== Blackpool F.C. Hall of Fame ==
Hutchison was inducted into the Hall of Fame at Bloomfield Road, when it was officially opened by former Blackpool player Jimmy Armfield in April 2006. Organised by the Blackpool Supporters Association, Blackpool fans around the world voted on their all-time heroes. Five players from each decade are inducted; Hutchison is in the 1970s.

== Honours ==
Blackpool

- Anglo-Italian Cup: 1971

Seattle Sounders

- North American Soccer League National Conference Western Division: 1979–80

Manchester City

- FA Cup runner-up: 1980–81

Bulova

- Hong Kong FA Cup: 1981–82, 1982–83
- Hong Kong Viceroy Cup: 1981–82, 1982–83

Swansea City

- Football League Fourth Division play-offs: 1988
- Welsh Cup: 1988–89

Individual

- PFA Team of the Year: 1986–87 Fourth Division
- Coventry City Hall of Fame

== See also ==
- List of footballers in England by number of league appearances
- List of men's footballers with the most official appearances
