= Tommy Godwin (footballer) =

Irish footballer (1927-1996)

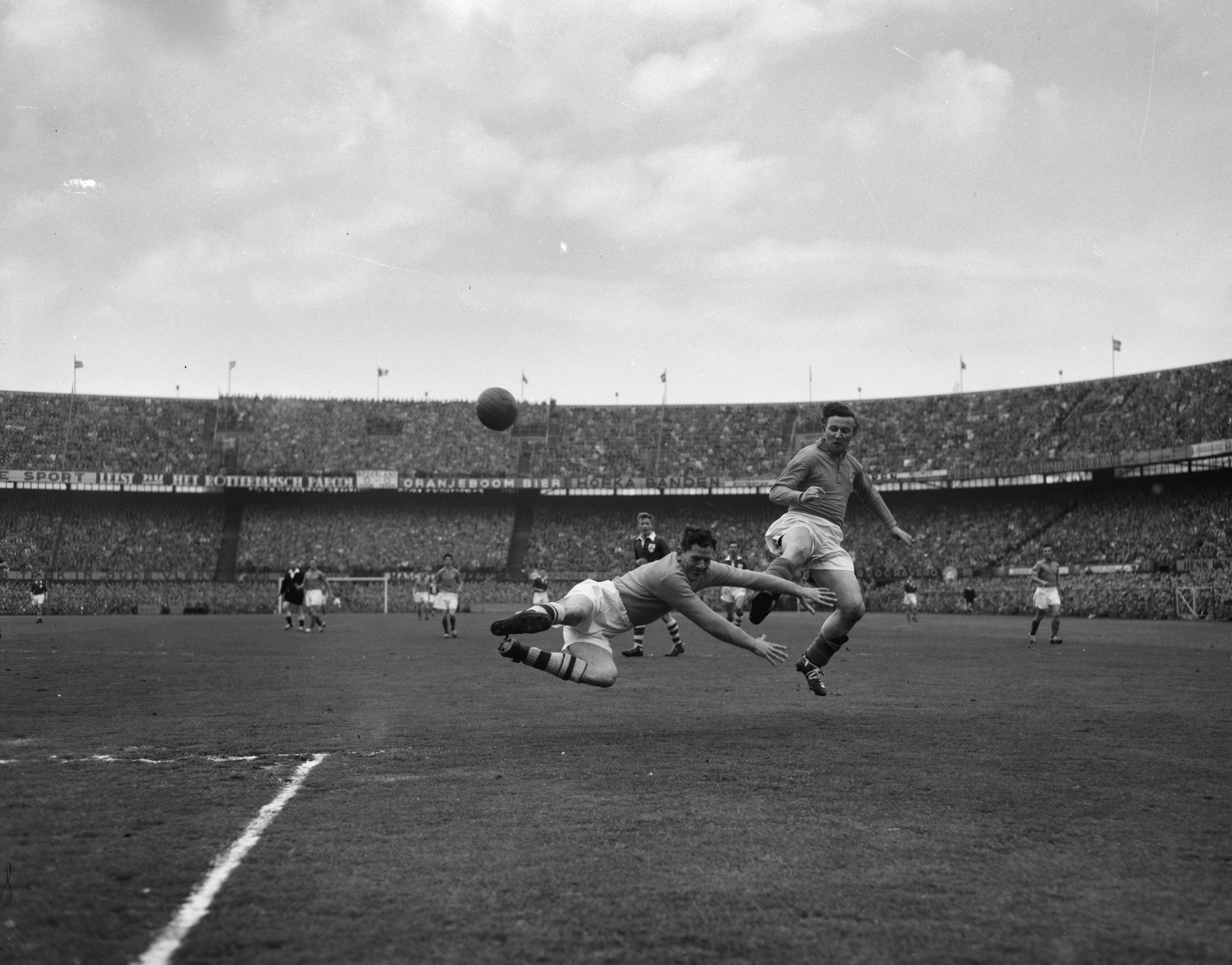
- Godwin (Netherlands vs. Ireland, 1956)

Personal information
- Full name: Thomas Fergus Godwin
- Date of birth: 20 August 1927
- Place of birth: Dublin, Ireland
- Date of death: 21 August 1996 (aged 69)
- Position: Goalkeeper

Youth career
- Reds United
- Home Farm

Senior career*
| Years | Team | Apps | (Gls) |
| 1947–1949 | Shamrock Rovers | 30 | (0) |
| 1949–1952 | Leicester City | 45 | (0) |
| 1952–1962 | Bournemouth & Boscombe Athletic | 357 | (0) |

International career
| 1948 | League of Ireland XI | 1 | (0) |
| 1949–1958 | Ireland | 13 | (0) |
| 1955 | All-Ireland XI | 1 | (0) |
- * Club domestic league appearances and goals

Thomas Fergus Godwin (20 August 1927 – 21 August 1996), commonly referred to as Tommy Godwin, was an Irish footballer who played for Shamrock Rovers, Leicester City and Bournemouth & Boscombe Athletic. On 21 September 1949, together with Con Martin, Johnny Carey and Peter Farrell, he was also a member of the Irish Football Team formed in Ireland that defeated England in 1949 at Goodison Park, becoming the first non – Uk team to beat England at home.

== Playing career ==
=== Shamrock Rovers ===
After playing as a youth with both Reds United and Home Farm, Godwin joined Shamrock Rovers while he continued to work as a carpenter. He made his Rovers debut in a friendly against Leeds United and saved a penalty. It was one of many penalties Tommy saved while at Milltown. He played in the semi-final of the 1948 FAI Cup, but missed the final after breaking a leg. While playing for Rovers, his teammates included, among others Frank Glennon and Paddy Coad. He also represented the League of Ireland XI and made his international debut for Ireland. In all he earned 5 caps while in the green and white.

=== Leicester City ===
In September 1949, after his impressive performances while playing for Ireland, Godwin transferred to Leicester City. He made his English League debut for City on 26 November 1949 at home to Swansea Town. While with Leicester he faced competition for the goalkeepers position from Scotland international John Anderson. As a result, he made just 45 league appearances and 1 FA Cup appearances in four seasons.

=== Bournemouth & Boscombe Athletic ===
In June 1952 Godwin signed for Bournemouth & Boscombe Athletic and remained with the club for ten years making 357 league appearances in the Third Division South and Third Division. In 1957 Godwin was a member of the Bournemouth team that reached the quarter-finals of the FA Cup. In the first three rounds, they knocked out Burton Albion, Swindon Town and Accrington Stanley, scoring 11 goals in the process and conceding none. However it was the next three games that saw the team attract national attention. In round four they beat a Wolves team featuring Billy Wright 1–0 in front of a Molineux crowd of 42,000. Wolves were, at the time, placed third in the First Division. In the last 16 they faced second placed Tottenham Hotspur with a team that included Danny Blanchflower, Terry Medwin and Ted Ditchburn. At their home ground of Dean Court in front of 25,892, Bournemouth won 3–1. In the quarter-finals they face Manchester United, the league leaders and cup holders. In front of 28,799 at Dean Court they took a shock lead after just 10 minutes. However they eventually lost 2–1 to the Busby Babes.

=== Ireland international ===
Between 1949 and 1958 Godwin made 13 appearances for Ireland. He made his international debut on 22 May 1949 in a 1–0 win against Portugal at Dalymount Park. This would be the first of four clean sheets he kept during his international career. Godwin quickly established himself as a regular in the team and played in all four of the 1950 World Cup qualifiers against Sweden and Finland. The highlight of his international career came on 21 September 1949 when he was a member of the Ireland team that defeated England 2–0 at Goodison Park, becoming the first non-UK team to beat England at home. He put in an outstanding performance, keeping the third clean sheet of his international career. The game proved to be the turning point in his career and within days he was signed by Leicester City.

Godwin later lost his place in the Ireland team to Fred Kiernan, but in 1956 after a six-year absence, he earned a recall and subsequently played in two qualifiers for the 1958 World Cup, one against England and one against Denmark. In doing so, he became the first Bournemouth player to be called up to a senior national team. He made his last appearance for Ireland on 11 May 1958 in a 2–2 away draw in a friendly against Poland. On 9 May 1955 at Dalymount Park, Godwin also played for an All-Ireland XI against an England XI in an unofficial international organised as part of the An Tóstal festival. His teammates included, among others, Robin Lawler, Con Martin, Peter Doherty and Peter McParland. The English XI won 6–5 .

| Date | Competition | Venue | Opponent | Score |
|---|---|---|---|---|
| 22.05.1949 | Friendly | H | Portugal | 1–0 |
| 02.06.1949 | World Cup Qualifier | A | Sweden | 1–3 |
| 12.06.1949 | Friendly | H | Spain | 1–4 |
| 08.09.1949 | World Cup Qualifier | H | Finland | 3–0 |
| 21.09.1949 | Friendly | A | England | 2–0 |
| 09.10.1949 | World Cup Qualifier | A | Finland | 1–1 |
| 13.11.1949 | World Cup Qualifier | H | Sweden | 1–3 |
| 10.05.1950 | Friendly | A | Belgium | 1–5 |
| 26.11.1950 | Friendly | H | Norway | 2–2 |
| 10.05.1956 | Friendly | A | Holland | 4–1 |
| 19.05.1957 | World Cup Qualifier | H | England | 1–1 |
| 02.10.1957 | World Cup Qualifier | A | Denmark | 2–0 |
| 11.05.1958 | Friendly | A | Poland | 2–2 |

== Later years ==
After retiring in 1962, Godwin settled in Bournemouth and worked for the local council as a parks supervisor.

== Honours ==
Shamrock Rovers

- Dublin City Cup
  - 1947–48: 1
- Dublin and Belfast Intercity Cup
  - 1948–49: 1
- LFA President's Cup
  - 1948–49: 1
