= Tommy O'Connor =

Irish footballer

Personal information
- Full name: Thomas O'Connor
- Date of birth: 1 April 1928
- Place of birth: Dublin, Ireland
- Date of death: 30 June 1987 (aged 59)
- Position: Outside left

Senior career*
Years	Team	Apps	(Gls)
1948–1954	Shamrock Rovers	44	(10)

International career
1951	League of Ireland XI	1	(0)
1949	Ireland	4	(0)
- * Club domestic league appearances and goals

Thomas O'Connor ( 1 April 1928 - 30 June 1987) was an Irish footballer who played for Shamrock Rovers. On 21 September 1949, together with Con Martin, Johnny Carey and Peter Farrell, he was also a member of the Ireland team that defeated England 2–0 at Goodison Park, becoming the first non-UK team to beat England at home.

== Career ==
O'Connor first attracted attention while playing for Shamrock Rovers in the early part of the 1948–49 season. His impressive performances for Rovers led him to making four appearances for Ireland in 1949. He made his international debut on 8 September 1949 in a 3–0 win against Finland at Dalymount Park. The game was a 1950 World Cup qualifier and O'Connor put in an impressive performance, helping the Irish win 3–0.

O'Connor was preferred over both Tommy Eglington and Jackie O'Driscoll for the game against England. This proved an astute selection as O'Connor set up both of the Irish goals. Ireland took the lead in the 33rd minute when Peter Desmond, after collecting a pass from O'Connor, was brought down in the penalty area; Con Martin converted the subsequent penalty kick. In the 85th minute, O'Connor slipped the ball to Peter Farrell and as the English goalkeeper Bert Williams advanced, Farrell lofted the ball into the unguarded net.

He made his third appearance for Ireland on 9 October in the return game against Finland, which finished as a 1–1 draw, before making his final international appearance on 13 November against Sweden in 3–1 home defeat. Like his debut, both of these games were World Cup qualifiers.

After leaving Rovers, O'Connor played in the Leinster Senior League.

== Sources ==
- Sean Ryan (1997). The Boys in Green – The FAI International Story.
- Paul Doolan; Robert Goggins. The Hoops. ISBN 0-7171-2121-6.
