= Bill Gorman (footballer) =

Irish footballer and manager (1911–1978)

Personal information
- Full name: William Charles Gorman
- Date of birth: 13 July 1911
- Place of birth: County Sligo, Ireland
- Date of death: 30 November 1978 (aged 67)
- Place of death: Bury, England
- Height: 5 ft 11 1/2 in (1.82 m)
- Position: Full back

Senior career*
Years	Team	Apps	(Gls)
?–1936	Shettleston		
1936–1938	Bury	52	(0)
1938–1950	Brentford	128	(0)
1940–1941	→ Bury (guest)	14	(0)
1941	→ Manchester United (guest)	2	(0)
1943–1944	→ Bolton Wanderers (guest)	34	(1)
1943–1944	→ Liverpool (guest)	1	(0)
1944–1945	→ Bury (guest)	29	(0)
1950–1952	Deal Town		

International career
1936–1947	Ireland (FAI)	13	(0)
1946–1948	Ireland (IFA)	4	(0)

Managerial career
- 1950–1955: Deal Town
- * Club domestic league appearances and goals

William Charles Gorman (13 July 1911 – December 1978) was an Irish footballer who played for, among others, Bury and Brentford. Gorman was a dual internationalist who also played for both Ireland teams – the FAI XI and the IFA XI. In September 1946 Gorman, along with Johnny Carey, actually played for both teams against England within three days of each other. The 11 international caps Gorman won while playing for Bury remain a club record.

== Club career ==
Although born in County Sligo, Gorman was raised in Scotland and spoke with a Scottish accent. He began his footballing career with junior club Shettleston. An engineer by trade, he went completely bald by the time he was 19 and subsequently became known as Old Naked Brains. In 1936, at the age of 25, Gorman moved south to the English League and joined Bury. Early in the 1938–39 season, Gorman made a £7,000 move to Brentford where he is still talked of as one of the club's greatest ever defenders.

During the Second World War, Gorman continued to play for Brentford in regional leagues. However, he also spent time in Lancashire where he had two spells guesting regularly for Bury. He spent the 1943–44 season guesting at Bolton Wanderers where his teammates included a young Nat Lofthouse. The war also gave Gorman the chance to guest with both Manchester United and Liverpool. In October 1950 he was appointed player-manager of Deal Town of the semi-professional Kent League. He eventually retired as a player in 1952, but as a manager guided Deal to the league title in 1954.

== Irish international ==
When Gorman began his international career in 1936 there were, in effect, two Ireland teams, chosen by two rival associations. Both associations, the Northern Ireland – based IFA and the Irish Free State – based FAI claimed jurisdiction over the whole of Ireland and selected players from the whole island. As a result, several notable Irish players from this era, including Gorman, played for both teams.

=== FAI XI ===
Between 1936 and 1947 Gorman made 13 appearances for the FAI XI. He made his international debut on 17 March 1936 in a 1–0 win against Switzerland at Dalymount Park. Among the highlights of his international career were helping the FAI XI beat Germany 5–2 in a friendly on 17 October 1936. On 7 November 1937 he also played for the FAI XI in a World Cup qualifier against Norway. The game finished as a 3–3 draw. On 30 September 1946 he was a member of the first ever FAI XI to play against England. Despite a credible performance, the FAI XI lost 1–0. Two days earlier Gorman had made his debut for the IFA XI against the same opponents. He made his last appearance for the FAI XI on 4 May 1947 in 2–0 defeat against Portugal.

=== IFA XI ===
Between 1946 and 1948 Gorman also made four appearances for the IFA XI. He made his debut for the IFA XI on 28 September 1946 in a 7–2 defeat against England. On 27 November 1946, together with Johnny Carey, Con Martin, Peter Farrell, Tommy Eglington, Alex Stevenson and Davy Walsh, he was one of seven players born in the Irish Free State to line up for the IFA XI against Scotland at Hampden Park. The 0–0 draw helped the IFA XI finish as runners-up in the 1947 British Home Championship. He also helped the IFA XI gain a 2–1 victory over Wales on 16 April 1947. His fourth and final appearance for the IFA XI was a 2–0 defeat to Wales on 10 March 1948.

== Later years ==
In February 1955 Gorman returned to Bury to work as an engineering inspector. He remained a regular spectator at Bury F.C. matches, and also carried out some scouting work for Manchester City while his friend George Poyser was manager. He took early retirement from his job in March 1975. His wife died suddenly, only a few weeks later. After a couple of heart attacks, he died in November 1978 at the age of 67. His daughter and grandson subsequently worked for Bury F.C.

== Honours ==
=== Player ===
Ireland

- British Home Championship
  - Runners-up 1946–47 1

=== Manager ===
Deal Town

- Kent League
  - Winners 1953–54: 1

=== Individual ===
- Brentford Hall of Fame
