= 1949–50 British Home Championship =

Tournament details
- Host country: United Kingdom
- Dates: 1 October 1949 – 15 April 1950
- Teams: 4

Final positions
- Champions: England (29th title)
- Runners-up: Scotland

Tournament statistics
- Matches played: 6
- Goals scored: 29 (4.83 per match)
- Top scorer: (England) Jack Rowley (4)

1949–50 British Home Championship was one of the most significant competitions of the British Home Championship football tournament. This year saw the competition doubling up as Group 1 in the qualifying rounds for the 1950 FIFA World Cup. It was the first time that either England, Wales, Scotland or Ireland (IFA) had entered a World Cup competition. It was also a significant moment in the history of Irish football as it was the last time that the (Northern) Irish Football Association entered a team featuring players born in both Northern Ireland and what is now the Republic of Ireland.

Both England and Scotland began well, the Scots beating Ireland 8–2 at Windsor Park while England beat Wales 4–1 in Cardiff. Both teams continued their dominance in the second round of matches, Scotland beating Wales 2–0 whilst Ireland were again heavily defeated, this time losing 9–2 to England. In the final round of games Ireland and Wales gained some consolation points with a goalless draw while − England took first place by beating Scotland 1–0 in a hard-fought game in Glasgow.

== World Cup qualifying ==
FIFA offered two places at the 1950 FIFA World Cup to the winners and runners up of the competition. However Scotland insisted they would only enter if they won the championship outright and even though they finished second, the Scottish FA declined the opportunity to enter a team in the World Cup finals for the first time. FIFA subsequently offered their place to both France, the runners-up in Group 3 and Ireland (FAI), the runners-up in Group 5. However both teams also declined the invitation. Despite winning the championship, England failed to impress at the World Cup. After defeating Chile 2–0 they then lost 1–0 to both the United States and Spain and failed to qualify for the second stage.

== Last all-Ireland team ==
Until 1950 there were, in effect, two Ireland teams, chosen by two rival associations. Both associations, the Belfast-based IFA and the Dublin-based FAI claimed jurisdiction over the whole of Ireland and selected players from the whole island. As a result, several notable Irish players from this era played for both teams.

The game between the IFA XI and Wales at the Racecourse Ground, Wrexham on 8 March 1950 marked the end of an era in Irish football history. The result was irrelevant, as both teams had lost their previous games and had nothing to play for but pride. However, the 0–0 draw saw the IFA XI field an all-Ireland team for the last time. The team included four players - Tom Aherne, Reg Ryan, Davy Walsh and the captain, Con Martin - who were born in what is now the Republic of Ireland. Since this game was also a qualifier for the 1950 FIFA World Cup, the situation led to controversy. All four players had previously played for the FAI XI in their qualifiers. Both Martin and Walsh had even scored for the FAI XI. As a result, the four players actually played for two different associations in the same FIFA World Cup tournament.

FIFA intervened, after complaints from the FAI, and subsequently restricted players' eligibility based on the political border. In 1953 FIFA ruled neither team could be referred to as Ireland, decreeing that the FAI team be officially designated as the Republic of Ireland, while the IFA team was to become Northern Ireland. The IFA objected and in 1954 were permitted to continue using the name Ireland in the British Home Championship. This practice was discontinued in the late 1970s.

== Table ==
Pos	Team	Pld	W	D	L	GF	GA	GD	Pts	Qualification
1	England (C)	3	3	0	0	14	3	+11	6	Qualification for 1950 FIFA World Cup
2	Scotland	3	2	0	1	10	3	+7	4	Qualification for 1950 FIFA World Cup
3	Wales	3	0	1	2	1	6	−5	1	
4	Ireland (IFA)	3	0	1	2	4	17	−13	1	

Source: RSSSF
Rules for classification: 1) points. The points system worked as follows: 2 points for a win and 1 point for a draw.
(C) Champions

== Results ==
1 October 1949

Ireland	2–8	Scotland
Smyth 50', 60'	Report	2', 70', 88' Morris; 5', 31' (pen.) Waddell; 23' Steel; 24' Reilly; 80' Mason

Windsor Park, Belfast
Attendance: 50,000
Referee: Reginald E. Mortimer (England)

15 October 1949

Wales	1–4	England
Griffiths 80'	Report	22' Mortensen; 29', 34', 66' Milburn

Ninian Park, Cardiff
Attendance: 60,000
Referee: Jack Mowat (Scotland)

9 November 1949

Scotland	2–0	Wales
McPhail 25'; Linwood 78'	Report

Hampden Park, Glasgow
Attendance: 73,782
Referee: Samuel Edgar Law (England)

16 November 1949

England	9–2	Ireland
Rowley 5', 47', 55', 58'; Froggatt 28'; Pearson 31', 75'; Mortensen 35', 50'	Report	52' Smyth; 85' Brennan

Maine Road, Manchester
Attendance: 57,000
Referee: B M Griffiths (Wales)

8 March 1950

Wales	0–0	Ireland
	Report

Racecourse Ground, Wrexham
Attendance: 60,000
Referee: A Ellis (England)

15 April 1950

Scotland	0–1	England
	Report	63' Bentley

Hampden Park, Glasgow
Attendance: 138,000
Referee: Reginald J. Leafe (England)

== Team squads ==
=== England ===
Head coach: (England) Walter Winterbottom

Pos.	Player	DoB	Games played	Goals	Minutes played	Sub off	Sub on	(Wales)		(Scotland)	Club
DF	John Aston	3 September 1921	3	0	270	0	0	90	90	90	(England) Manchester United
FW	Roy Bentley	17 May 1924	1	1	90	0	0	–	–	90	(England) Chelsea F.C.
MF	Jimmy Dickinson	25 April 1925	2	0	180	0	0	90	–	90	(England) Portsmouth F.C.
FW	Tom Finney	5 April 1922	3	0	270	0	0	90	90	90	(England) /2 Preston North End
DF	Neil Franklin	24 January 1922	3	0	270	0	0	90	90	90	(England) Stoke City
FW	Jack Froggatt	17 November 1922	1	1	90	0	0	–	90	–	(England) Portsmouth F.C.
FW	Johnny Hancocks	30 April 1919	1	0	90	0	0	90	–	–	(England) Wolverhampton Wanderers
FW	Bobby Langton	8 September 1918	1	0	90	0	0	–	–	90	(England) Bolton Wanderers
FW	Wilf Mannion	16 May 1918	1	0	90	0	0	–	–	90	(England) Middlesbrough F.C.
FW	Jackie Milburn	11 May 1924	1	3	90	0	0	90	–	–	(England) Newcastle United
FW	Stan Mortensen	26 May 1921	3	3	270	0	0	90	90	90	(England) Blackpool F.C.
DF	Bert Mozley	21 September 1923	2	0	180	0	0	90	90	–	(England) Derby County
FW	Stan Pearson	15 January 1919	1	2	90	0	0	–	90	–	(England) Manchester United
DF	Alf Ramsey	22 January 1920	1	0	90	0	0	–	–	90	(England) /2 Tottenham Hotspur
FW	Jack Rowley	7 October 1920	1	4	90	0	0	–	90	–	(England) Manchester United
FW	Len Shackleton	3 May 1922	1	0	90	0	0	90	–	–	(England) Sunderland A.F.C.
GK	Bernard Streten	14 January 1921	1	0	90	0	0	–	90	–	(England) /2 Luton Town
MF	Willie Watson	7 March 1920	1	0	90	0	0	–	90	–	(England) Sunderland A.F.C.
GK	Bert Williams	31 January 1920	2	0	180	0	0	90	–	90	(England) Wolverhampton Wanderers
MF	Billy Wright	6 February 1924	3	0	270	0	0	90	90	90	(England) Wolverhampton Wanderers

=== Scotland ===
Head coach: none, SFA Selection Committee

Pos.	Player	DoB	Games played	Goals	Minutes played	Sub off	Sub on		(Wales)	(England)	Club
MF	George Aitken	28 May 1925	2	0	180	0	0	90	90	–	(Scotland) East Fife
FW	Willie Bauld	24 January 1928	1	0	90	0	0	–	–	90	(Scotland) Heart of Midlothian
GK	Jimmy Cowan	16 June 1926	3	0	270	0	0	90	90	90	(Scotland) /2 Greenock Morton
DF	Sammy Cox	13 April 1924	3	0	270	0	0	90	90	90	(Scotland) Rangers
MF	Bobby Evans	16 July 1927	2	0	180	0	0	90	90	–	(Scotland) Celtic
MF	Alex Forbes	21 January 1925	1	0	90	0	0	–	–	90	(England) Arsenal F.C.
FW	Billy Liddell	10 January 1922	2	0	180	0	0	–	90	90	(England) Liverpool F.C.
FW	Alec Linwood	13 March 1920	1	1	90	0	0	–	90	–	(Scotland) Clyde
FW	Jimmy Mason	18 June 1919	1	1	90	0	0	90	–	–	(Scotland) Third Lanark
MF	Ian McColl	7 June 1927	1	0	90	0	0	–	–	90	(Scotland) Rangers
FW	John McPhail	27 December 1923	1	1	90	0	0	–	90	–	(Scotland) Celtic
FW	Willie Moir	19 April 1922	1	0	90	0	0	–	–	90	(England) Bolton Wanderers
FW	Henry Morris	17 December 1919	1	3	90	0	0	90	–	–	(Scotland) East Fife
FW	Lawrie Reilly	28 October 1928	2	1	180	0	0	90	90	–	(Scotland) Hibernian
FW	Billy Steel	1 May 1923	3	1	270	0	0	90	90	90	(England) Derby County
FW	William Waddell	7 March 1921	2	2	180	0	0	90	–	90	(Scotland) Rangers
MF	Willie Woodburn	8 August 1919	3	0	270	0	0	90	90	90	(Scotland) Rangers
DF	George Young	27 October 1922	3	0	270	0	0	90	90	90	(Scotland) Rangers

=== Ireland (IFA) ===
Head coach: none, managed by a committee

Pos.	Player	DoB	Games played	Goals	Minutes played	Sub off	Sub on	(Scotland)	(England)	(Wales)	Club
DF	Tom Aherne	26 January 1919	1	0	90	0	0	–	–	90	(England) /2 Luton Town
MF	Danny Blanchflower	10 February 1926	2	0	180	0	0	90	–	90	(England) /2 Barnsley
DF/MF	Gerry Bowler	8 June 1919	3	0	270	0	0	90	90	90	(England) /2 Hull City
FW	Bobby Brennan	14 March 1925	3	1	270	0	0	90	90	90	(England) Birmingham City
FW	Davy Cochrane	14 August 1920	2	0	180	0	0	90	90	–	(England) /2 Leeds United
FW	Eddie Crossan	17 November 1925	1	0	90	0	0	90	–	–	(England) /2 Blackburn Rovers
MF	Ray Ferris	22 September 1920	1	0	90	0	0	90	–	–	(England) Birmingham City
DF	Jim Feeney	23 June 1921	1	0	90	0	0	–	90	–	(England) /2 Swansea Town
GK	Hugh Kelly	17 August 1919	2	0	180	0	0	–	–	90	(England) Fulham
GK	Pat Kelly	9 April 1918	1	0	90	0	0	90	–	–	(England) /2 Barnsley
FW	Jimmy McCabe	17 September 1918	1	0	90	0	0	–	90	–	(England) /2 Leeds United
FW	Johnny McKenna	6 June 1926	3	0	270	0	0	90	90	90	(England) Huddersfield Town
DF	Alf McMichael	1 October 1927	2	0	180	0	0	90	90	–	(England) Newcastle United
DF	Con Martin	20 March 1923	1	0	90	0	0	–	–	90	(England) Aston Villa
MF	Reg Ryan	30 October 1925	1	0	90	0	0	–	–	90	(England) West Bromwich Albion
FW	Sammy Smyth	25 February 1925	3	3	270	0	0	90	90	90	(England) Wolverhampton Wanderers
FW	Charlie Tully	11 July 1924	1	0	90	0	0	–	90	–	(Scotland) Celtic
MF	Jackie Vernon	26 September 1918	3	0	270	0	0	90	90	90	(England) West Bromwich Albion
FW	Davy Walsh	28 April 1923	1	0	90	0	0	–	–	90	(England) West Bromwich Albion

== See also ==
- 1950 FIFA World Cup qualification
- 1950 FIFA World Cup
