= 1949 England v Ireland football match =

England v Ireland (1949)
- Event: International friendly
England	Ireland
(England)	(Republic of Ireland)
0	2
- Date: 21 September 1949
- Venue: Goodison Park, Liverpool
- Referee: Jack Mowat (Scotland)
- Attendance: 51,047

On 21 September 1949 at Goodison Park, Liverpool, the home of Everton, England were defeated 2–0 by Ireland in a friendly international. As a result, Ireland became the first foreign team to beat England at home. In 1953, the Hungarian team known as the Mighty Magyars defeated England 6–3, to become the second team to do so.

== Previous games ==
During the 1940s, there were in effect, two Ireland teams, chosen by two rival associations—the Northern Ireland-based Irish Football Association (IFA) and the Republic of Ireland-based Football Association of Ireland (FAI). Both organisations claimed jurisdiction over the whole of Ireland, and selected players from the whole island. As a result, several notable Irish players from this era had played for both teams. The IFA XI had played England regularly since 1882, and claimed their first victory, by a score of 3–0, on English soil at Ayresome Park, Middlesbrough on 14 February 1914, but this was only the second time England and the FAI XI had met. Despite this, several members of the FAI XI had played against England several times before while representing the IFA XI; striker Davy Walsh had previously scored three times against England.

The FAI XI had played England for the first time at Dalymount Park on 30 September 1946. A team, featuring Johnny Carey, Con Martin and Billy Walsh, were narrowly defeated 1–0 when Tom Finney scored the winner in the 82nd minute. Two days earlier, on 28 September, Carey and Tom Aherne had been included in the IFA XI that had been heavily defeated 7–2 by the same England side. The next time the IFA XI played England, on 5 November 1947, their team included six players—Carey, Martin, Billy Walsh, Peter Farrell, Davy Walsh and Tommy Eglington—who had previously played for the FAI XI. Davy Walsh scored the opening goal in a 2–2 draw at Goodison Park. Carey, Martin, Farrell and Walsh also played for the IFA XI in their 6–2 defeat by England at Windsor Park on 10 October 1948. Davy Walsh also scored both goals that day.

== The teams ==
The game was used by both teams as part of their preparations for forthcoming World Cup qualifiers. Despite the absence of both Stanley Matthews and Stan Mortensen, England fielded a strong team, including Billy Wright, Neil Franklin, Wilf Mannion and Tom Finney. Ireland's team included just seven First Division players, but these included Johnny Carey who had been voted Footballer of the Year in 1949. Another two Irish players, Tom Aherne and Tommy Moroney, like Finney, played in the English Second Division. The remaining two Irish players, goalkeeper Tommy Godwin and Tommy O'Connor both played for Shamrock Rovers in the League of Ireland.

== Match ==
=== Summary ===
The early pattern of the game saw England launch wave after wave of attacks. However Tommy Godwin was in inspired form and Con Martin, Tom Aherne and Johnny Carey proved to difficult for England to get past. Carey was also effective in keeping Tom Finney quiet, while wing-halves Billy Walsh and Tommy Moroney gradually took the sting out of the English front line. Ireland took the lead in the 33rd minute when Peter Desmond, after collecting a pass from Tommy O'Connor, burst into the England penalty area and was brought down. Con Martin then converted the subsequent penalty kick. During the second half the wave of England attacks continued. Peter Harris hit the bar and Jesse Pye also went close. However Peter Farrell, playing at his club Everton's home ground, made victory certain in the 85th minute. O'Connor slipped the ball to Farrell and as the English goalkeeper Bert Williams advanced, Farrell lofted the ball into the net.

England's attacking line-up and defensive resilience stood out, while Ireland impressed with their counter-attacking tactics and fighting spirit.

=== Details ===
21 September 1949

England	0–2	(Republic of Ireland) Ireland
	Report	Martin 33' (pen.); Farrell 85'

Goodison Park, Liverpool
Attendance: 51,047
Referee: Jack Mowat (Scotland)

England	Ireland

GK	Bert Williams
DF	Bert Mozley
DF	John Aston, Sr.
MF	Billy Wright (c)
MF	Cornelius Franklin
MF	Jimmy Dickinson
FW	Peter Harris
FW	Johnny Morris
FW	Jesse Pye
FW	Wilf Mannion
FW	Tom Finney
Coach:
Walter Winterbottom

GK	Tommy Godwin
DF	Johnny Carey (c)
DF	Tom Aherne
MF	Billy Walsh
MF	Con Martin
MF	Tommy Moroney
FW	Peter Corr
FW	Peter Farrell
FW	Davy Walsh
FW	Peter Desmond
FW	Tommy O'Connor
Coach
FAI Committee

== Sources ==
- The Boys in Green - The FAI International Story (1997): Sean Ryan

== See also ==
1929 Spain v England football match
