= Alex Stevenson =

Irish footballer & manager (1912–1985)

Personal information
- Full name: Alexander Ernest Stevenson
- Date of birth: 9 August 1912
- Place of birth: Dublin, Ireland
- Date of death: 2 September 1985 (aged 73)
- Position: Inside left

Senior career*
Years	Team	Apps	(Gls)
–1932	Dolphin		
1932–1934	Rangers	12	(7)
1934–1949	Everton	255	(82)
- → Tranmere Rovers (guest)
- → Blackpool (guest)
1949–1950	Bootle Athletic		

International career
1931	Irish Free State juniors		
1932–1948	Irish Free State		
	→ Ireland (FAI)	7	(0)
1933–1947	Ireland (IFA)	19	(5)
1935	Ireland/Wales XI	1	(0)

Managerial career
- 1953–1954: Republic of Ireland
- 1954–1958: St Patrick's Athletic
- 1958–1960: Waterford A.F.C.
- * Club domestic league appearances and goals

Alexander Ernest Stevenson (9 August 1912 – 2 September 1985) was an Irish footballer who played for Rangers and Everton, amongst other teams. As an international, Stevenson also played for both Ireland teams – the FAI XI and the IFA XI. Stevenson is one of only two footballers to have played for both the senior FAI XI and Glasgow Rangers and is one of only five players born in what is now the Republic of Ireland to play for the club, the others being Alex Craig, James Lowry McAuley, Jon Daly, and Ciara Grant.

== Club career ==
=== Early years ===
Stevenson began his career with Dolphins in the League of Ireland. In 1932 he helped them reach the final of the FAI Cup where they lost 1–0 to Shamrock Rovers. Shortly afterwards, on 8 May 1932, aged 19 and while still a Dolphins player, he made his debut for the FAI XI in a 2–0 away win against the Netherlands. In August 1932 he signed for Rangers after being spotted by Arthur Dixon, a club coach. As part of the transfer deal, Rangers played Dolphins in a friendly at Dalymount Park in 1933. Stevenson spent just a season and a half at Rangers. Although he made just 12 appearances in the Scottish League, he scored 7 goals and developed a reputation as a highly intelligent player. While at Rangers, Stevenson also made his debut for the IFA XI and he helped the club win the Division One title during the 1933–34 season.

=== Everton ===
In January 1934 Stevenson signed for Everton for a fee of £2,750 and made his debut for the club against Arsenal the following month. He remains one of Everton's all-time top goalscorers. He was also a great supplier of goals, first to Dixie Dean and then to Tommy Lawton and he formed an excellent understanding with fellow Irish international Jackie Coulter on the left wing. In 1938–39, together with Lawton, Joe Mercer and Tommy G. Jones he was a member of the Everton team that won the last First Division title before the start of the Second World War. During this campaign he scored 10 goals in 36 games.

During the war, while continuing to play for Everton, Stevenson also enlisted in the RAF. Between 1939 and 1946 he made 202 appearances and scored 89 goals for Everton in wartime regional leagues. One of the highlights of his wartime career came on 1 June 1940 when he scored a hat-trick in the last five minutes of a game against Manchester United. As well as playing for Everton, he also turned out as a guest for both Tranmere Rovers and Blackpool. After the war Stevenson played in an Everton team that also included fellow Irish internationals Peter Farrell, Tommy Eglington and Peter Corr and future team manager Harry Catterick. By the time he finished his career with the club he had made 255 Football League appearances and scored 82 league goals. He also played a further 16 games and scored a further 8 goals in the FA Cup. He made his final league appearance for Everton on 7 May 1949.

== Irish international ==
When Stevenson began his international career in 1932 there were, in effect, two Ireland teams, chosen by two rival associations. Both associations, the Belfast-based IFA and the Dublin-based FAI claimed jurisdiction over the whole of Ireland and selected players from the whole island. As a result, several notable Irish players from this era, including Stevenson, played for both teams. Though his international career was marred by Everton rejecting his call up.

=== FAI XI ===
Between 1932 and 1948 Stevenson made 7 appearances for the FAI XI, making his international debut on 8 May 1932 in a 2–0 win against the Netherlands. His teammates that day also included fellow dual internationalists, Mick O'Brien, Jimmy Kelly and Paddy Moore. In October 1931 Stevenson had also played for a junior FAI XI against Scotland at Falkirk. However, Stevenson had to wait for fourteen years, partly because of the Second World War, before he made his second appearance for the FAI XI on 30 September 1946 in a 1–0 defeat to England.

Puzzled by the fourteen-year gap between his first and second FAI cap, Stevenson apparently approached both the Everton secretary-manager, Theo Kelly, and the FAI secretary Joe Wickham for an explanation but neither was prepared to offer one. Stevenson, who was a Protestant, was accused in some quarters of refusing to play for the FAI XI on religious grounds, but he was adamant that religion had nothing to do with it on his part. He subsequently played for the FAI XI a further five times, helping them to a notable victory against Spain on 2 March 1947. He made his last appearance for the FAI XI on 5 December 1948 in a 1–0 defeat against Switzerland. However this was not his last involvement with the FAI. Between 1953 and 1955 Stevenson served as coach of the Republic of Ireland.

=== IFA XI ===
Between 1933 and 1947 Stevenson also made 19 appearances and scored 5 goals for the IFA XI, making his debut on 16 September 1933 in a 2–1 away win against Scotland, with the press praising his contribution. He subsequently formed a notable inside forward partnership with Peter Doherty. He scored his first goal for the IFA XI on 6 February 1935 in 2–1 defeat against England. He also scored against England in a 5–1 defeat on 23 October 1937. His remaining three goals were all scored against Wales in 1936, 1937 and 1947.

On 11 May 1935, at Goodison Park, Stevenson also played for an Ireland/Wales XI in a 10–2 defeat against an English League XI. During the Second World War, he also played in two wartime internationals for the IFA XI. On 9 September 1944 at Windsor Park, he played an 8–4 defeat against a Combined Services XI. This team was basically a Great Britain XI and featured, among others, Matt Busby, Stanley Matthews, Tommy Lawton and Stan Mortensen. He also played in the Victory international against Scotland at Windsor Park on 2 February 1946.

On 27 November, 1946 Stevenson was one of seven players who had been born in the Irish Free State, to be selected by the IFA to play against Scotland. The other six were Johnny Carey, Con Martin, Bill Gorman, Tommy Eglington, Peter Farrell and Davy Walsh. On 16 April 1947, he scored his last goal for the IFA XI in a 2–1 win against Wales. These two results helped the IFA XI finish as runners-up in the 1947 British Home Championship. Later that year, Stevenson made his last appearance for the IFA XI on 4 October 1947 in a 2–0 win against Scotland.

== Honours ==
=== As a player ===
Dolphins

- FAI Cup: Runners-up 1932

Rangers

- Scottish Champions: 1933–34

Everton

- English Champions: 1938–39

Ireland

- British Home Championship: Runners-up 1946–47

=== As a manager ===
- League of Ireland/Premier Division: 2
  - St Patrick's Athletic 1954–55, 1955–56
- League of Ireland Shield: 1
  - Waterford 1959–60

== Sources ==
- Who's Who of Everton (2004): Tony Matthews
- The Boys in Green – The FAI International Story (1997): Sean Ryan
- Soccer at War – 1939 – 45 (2005): Jack Rollin
