= Davy Walsh =

Irish footballer (1923–2016)

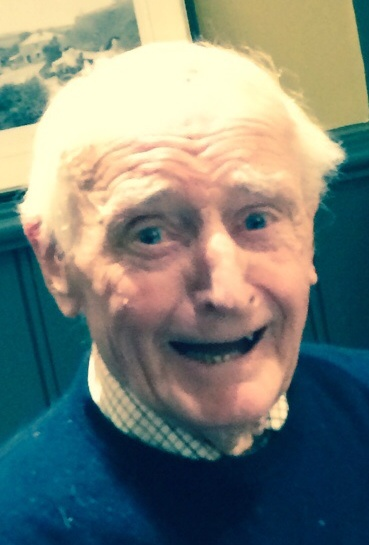
- Walsh in 2014

Personal information
- Full name: David Joseph Walsh
- Date of birth: 28 April 1923
- Place of birth: Waterford, Ireland
- Date of death: 14 March 2016 (aged 92)
- Height: 5 ft 11 in (1.80 m)
- Position: Centre forward

Youth career
- St. Joseph's
- Corinthians
- Shelbourne (Waterford)
- Glen Rovers

Senior career*
Years	Team	Apps	(Gls)
1942–1943	Limerick United	16	(13)
1943	→ Shelbourne (loan)	0	(0)
1943–1946	Linfield		
1946–1950	West Bromwich Albion	165	(94)
1947	→ Shamrock Rovers (guest)	1	(0)
1950–1955	Aston Villa	108	(37)
1955–1956	Walsall	20	(6)
1956–1957	Worcester City		

International career
1945–1946	Irish League XI	3	(2)
1946–1950	Ireland (IFA)	11	(7)
1946–1953	Ireland (FAI)	20	(5)
- * Club domestic league appearances and goals

David Joseph Walsh (28 April 1923 – 14 March 2016) was an Irish footballer who played as a centre forward for, among others, Linfield, West Bromwich Albion and Aston Villa. Walsh was a dual international and played for both Ireland teams – the FAI XI and the IFA XI. In 1949, he was a member of the FAI XI that defeated England 2–0 at Goodison Park, becoming the first team to beat England at home.

Walsh was a player with an eye for goal. Nimble and decisive in front of goal, he had the knack for being in the right place at the right time. After retiring as a player Walsh owned a sports shop / general store in Droitwich and later ran holiday homes in Thurlestone and Kingsbridge in Devon. In June 2003, Walsh, together with such other notable Waterford footballers as Paddy Coad, Alfie Hale, Peter Thomas, Jim Beglin and John O'Shea, was honoured by the city council and presented with Waterford Crystal vase. He died in 2016.

== Playing career ==
=== Irish Leagues ===
Walsh began his career playing youth football in Waterford before joining Limerick United in 1942 making his debut on 4 October scoring twice against St James's Gate F.C. in the League of Ireland Shield. Despite Limerick finishing second from bottom in the competition Walsh scored 6 goals. At the end of a very successful goalscoring 1942–43 League of Ireland season he was loaned to Shelbourne for their Dublin and Belfast Inter-City Cup ties.

In 1943 he moved north of the border and joined Irish League side Linfield. Walsh scored 122 goals in Ireland, including 73 during the 1945–46 season for Linfield. While at Linfield he helped them win the Irish Cup in 1945 and a Northern Regional League / Irish Cup double in 1946. His teammates at Linfield included, among others Tommy Breen, Sammy McCrory and guest player Billy Liddell. On 8 June 1947, together with Jackie Vernon, Walsh returned to Ireland to play as a guest for Shamrock Rovers in a friendly against Everton.

=== English League ===
In May 1946, Walsh joined West Bromwich Albion for a fee of £3,500 and subsequently made a terrific start to his English League career by scoring in each of his first six games. He continued to score regularly for WBA and, together with Reg Ryan and Jackie Vernon, he was a key figure when they gained promotion in 1949. He went on to score 100 goals for WBA before moving to Aston Villa for a fee of £25,000 in December 1950. He made 114 appearances and scored 40 goals for Villa, averaging a goal every three games, before moving onto Walsall in July 1955. After one season there he joined Worcester City where he retired as a player in May 1957.

== Irish international ==
When Walsh began his international career in 1946 there were, in effect, two Ireland teams, chosen by two rival associations. Both associations, the Northern Ireland-based IFA and the Ireland-based FAI claimed jurisdiction over the whole of Ireland and selected players from the whole island. As a result, several notable Irish players from this era, including Walsh, played for both teams.

=== IFA XI ===
Between 1946 and 1950, Walsh made 11 appearances and scored seven goals for the IFA XI. These include two Victory internationals played in early 1946. On 2 February, at Windsor Park he made his debut for the IFA XI in a 3–2 defeat to Scotland, scoring both of his team's goals. Then, on 4 May, he helped the IFA XI defeat Wales 1–0 at Ninian Park. On 27 November 1946, he played for the IFA XI a 0–0 draw with Scotland. Together with Johnny Carey, Con Martin, Bill Gorman, Tommy Eglington, Alex Stevenson and Peter Farrell, he was one of seven players born in the Irish Free State to play for the IFA XI that day. The draw helped the team finish as runners-up in the 1947 British Home Championship. Walsh also helped the IFA XI gain some further respectable results, including a 2–0 win against Scotland on 4 October 1947 and a 2–2 draw with England at Goodison Park on 5 November 1947. It was at Goodison that Walsh scored his third goal for the IFA XI, in a game he was later to describe as the highlight of his footballing career.

Walsh also scored both goals for the IFA XI on 9 October 1948 in a 6–2 defeat to England at Windsor Park. He then scored twice in the first five minutes at Hampden Park against Scotland on 17 November 1948. However Walsh's goals could not prevent Scotland eventually winning 3–2. Despite both games ending in defeat, these four goals saw Walsh finish as top goalscorer during the 1949 British Home Championship. Walsh made his last appearance for the IFA XI in a 0–0 draw with Wales on 8 March 1950. As well as being part of the 1950 British Home Championship, the game also doubled up as a qualifier for the 1950 FIFA World Cup. Walsh, together with Con Martin, Reg Ryan and Tom Aherne, was one of four players from the Republic, included in the IFA XI that day and as a result he played for two different associations in the same FIFA World Cup tournament. This situation eventually led to intervention by FIFA and as a result Walsh became one of the last four Republic-born players to play for the IFA XI.

=== FAI XI ===
Between 1946 and 1953, Walsh made 20 appearances and scored five goals for the FAI XI, making his debut for the team in a 3–1 defeat to Portugal on 16 June 1946. On 2 March 1947, Walsh scored twice against Spain, helping the FAI XI to 3–2 win. Both of his goals that day were set up by a fellow Waterford footballer, Paddy Coad. On 2 June 1949, he scored his third goal in a 3–1 defeat to Sweden, during a qualifier for the 1950 FIFA World Cup. Then, on 21 September 1949, together with Con Martin, Johnny Carey and Peter Farrell, he was a member of the FAI XI that defeated England 2–0 at Goodison Park, becoming the first non-UK team to beat England at home. He scored his fourth goal on 26 November 1950 against Norway in a 2–2 draw. He scored his last goal for the FAI XI against France on 4 October 1953 and made his last appearance on 25 November 1953 in a 1–0 defeat against the same team. Both of these games were qualifiers for the 1954 FIFA World Cup.

== Honours ==
Linfield

- Irish Cup
  - Winners 1945, 1946 2
  - Runners-up 1944: 1
- Northern Regional League
  - Winners 1944–45, 1945–46: 2

West Bromwich Albion

- Second Division
  - Runners-up 1948–49: 1

Ireland

- British Home Championship
  - Runners-up 1946–47: 1
