= Tom Aherne =

Irish footballer and hurler

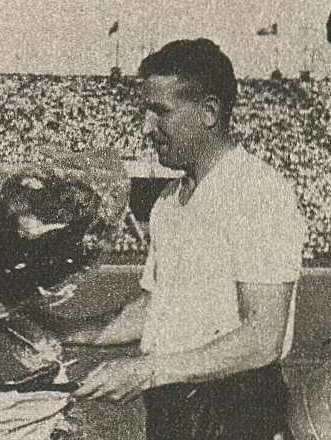

Personal information
- Date of birth: 26 January 1919
- Place of birth: Limerick, Ireland
- Date of death: 30 December 1999 (aged 80)
- Place of death: Luton, England
- Position: Left back

Senior career*
Years	Team	Apps	(Gls)
- Treaty Sarsfield (hurling)
- Limerick (hurling)
1937–1946	Limerick United		
1946–1949	Belfast Celtic		
1949–1957	Luton Town	267	(0)
1957–	Luton Celtic		

International career
1946–1950	Ireland (IFA)	6	(0)
1946–1953	Ireland (FAI)	16	(0)
1947–1948	Irish League XI	2	(0)
- * Club domestic league appearances and goals

Thomas Aherne (26 January 1919 – 30 December 1999), also referred to as Bud Aherne, was an Irish footballer and hurler. He played football for Belfast Celtic and Luton Town and was a dual internationalist, playing for both Ireland teams – the IFA XI and the FAI XI. In 1949 he was a member of the FAI XI that defeated England 2–0 at Goodison Park, becoming the first non-UK team to beat England at home. As a hurler he also played one game for Limerick.

After retiring as a player Aherne settled in Luton where he coached the Luton Town youth team, worked in the local car industry and ran a very successful licensed premises. He also continued to visit Limerick regularly and remained healthy and active until he was diagnosed with Alzheimer's disease in the mid-1990s. He died in December 1999 at the age of 80 and was survived by his wife, Eileen, two sons, Pat and Brian, and three daughters, Maura, Trisha and Catherine.

== Club career ==
=== Early years ===
Aherne was born in Limerick, Ireland. As a youth, he initially emerged as a prominent hurler with Treaty Sarsfields and also played one game for Limerick. However he subsequently decided to concentrate on football and began his senior career with Limerick United where his teammates included Davy Walsh. During the Second World War, Aherne served in the Irish Army and was stationed at Crosshaven. His impressive performances in the League of Ireland attracted attention and in 1946 he was signed by Belfast Celtic.

=== Belfast Celtic ===
While at Belfast Celtic, Aherne played alongside Jackie Vernon, Billy McMillan, Robin Lawler and Johnny Campbell and helped them win the Irish Cup in 1947 and an Irish League title in 1948. Aherne was also at Celtic during the infamous Boxing Day riot which broke out during a game against local rivals Linfield. Within a few months, Aherne had left Celtic and signed for Luton Town. However, in May 1949, Aherne temporarily rejoined Celtic for their final tour before the club disbanded. Together with McMillan, Campbell, Lawlor, guest player Mick O'Flanagan and manager Elisha Scott, he went on the Celtic tour of the North America. The highlight of the 10 game tour came on 29 May when Celtic beat the reigning British champions, Scotland, 2–0.

=== Luton Town ===
Aherne signed for Luton Town in March 1949 for a fee of £6,000 and made his English League debut on 19 March in a 2–1 away defeat to Tottenham Hotspur. Despite the fact he was over 30 when he joined Luton, he quickly established himself as a regular. Aherne played competitive football into his late thirties and was an ever-present during the 1954–55 season when Luton won promotion to Division One. After playing 288 games for Luton, including 267 in the league, he only retired after a hairline fracture of the ankle ended his career. Even then he continued to play for a local league team, Luton Celtic, into his forties.

== Irish international ==
When Aherne began his international career in 1946 there were in effect, two Ireland teams, chosen by two rival associations. Both associations, the Belfast-based Irish Football Association and the Dublin-based Football Association of Ireland, claimed jurisdiction over the whole of Ireland and selected players from the whole island. As a result, several notable Irish players from this era, including Aherne played for both teams.

=== FAI XI ===
Between 1946 and 1953 Aherne made 16 appearances for the FAI XI. He made his FAI debut in June 1946 during an Iberian tour, playing in both the 3–1 defeat to Portugal on 16 June and then helping the FAI XI gain a surprise 1–0 victory against Spain on 23 June. He remained a regular in the FAI XI throughout the late 1940s and early 1950s and featured prominently in the qualifying rounds for the 1950 World Cup. He was also a member of the FAI XI that defeated England 2–0 at Goodison Park, becoming the first non-UK team to beat England at home.

On 16 November 1953, during a 1–1 draw with France, Aherne briefly became involved in controversy. Although only a friendly, the game quickly became heated and at one point, Aherne chased Raymond Kopa down the tunnel after play had been stopped for a foul. Kopa allegedly ran for his life after upsetting Aherne once too often. The FAI selectors were not impressed and Aherne was told a repeat would end his international career. As it turned out he made only one more appearance for the FAI XI. That came on 4 October 1953 in 5–3 defeat against France during a qualifier for the 1954 FIFA World Cup.

=== IFA XI ===
Between 1946 and 1950, Aherne also made 6 appearances for the IFA XI. These include two Victory internationals played in early 1946. On 2 February at Windsor Park he made his debut for the IFA XI in a 3–2 defeat to Scotland at Windsor Park. Then on 4 May he helped the IFA XI defeat Wales 1–0 at Ninian Park. On 28 September 1946 Aherne also played for the IFA XI in a heavy defeat to England. The highlight of career with the IFA XI came on 4 October 1947 when he helped them gain a 2–0 win against Scotland.

He made his last appearance for the IFA XI in a 0–0 draw with Wales on 8 March 1950. As well as being part of the 1950 British Home Championship, the game also doubled up as a qualifier for the 1950 World Cup. Aherne, together with Con Martin, Reg Ryan and Davy Walsh, was one of four players from the Republic, included in the IFA XI that day and as a result he played for two different associations in the same FIFA World Cup tournament. This situation eventually led to intervention by FIFA and as a result Aherne became one of the last four Republic-born players to play for the IFA XI.

Aherne died in Luton, England, aged 80.

== Honours ==
Player

Belfast Celtic

- Irish League
  - Winners 1947–48: 1
- Irish Cup:
  - Winners 1946–47: 1
  - Runners Up 1948–49: 1

Luton Town

- Second Division
  - Runners Up 1954–55: 1

== Sources ==
- "Tom "Bud" Aherne". Ahern Obituaries – 2000.
- Sean Ryan (1997). The Boys in Green – The FAI International Story.
- Soccer at War – 1939 – 45 (2005): Jack Rollin
