= Peter Farrell (Irish footballer) =

Irish footballer (1922–1999)

Personal information
- Full name: Peter Desmond Farrell
- Date of birth: 16 August 1922
- Place of birth: Dalkey, County Dublin, Ireland
- Date of death: 16 March 1999 (aged 76)
- Place of death: Dalkey, County Dublin, Ireland
- Height: 5 ft 8 1/2 in (1.74 m)
- Positions: Right-half; inside forward

Youth career
- 193x–1939: Cabinteely Schoolboys

Senior career*
Years	Team	Apps	(Gls)
1939–1946	Shamrock Rovers		(7)
1946–1957	Everton	421	(14)
1957–1960	Tranmere Rovers	114	(1)
1961	Sligo Rovers	3	(0)

International career
1946–1957	Ireland (FAI)	28	(3)
1946–1949	Ireland (IFA)	7	(0)

Managerial career
- 1957–1960: Tranmere Rovers
- 1961: Sligo Rovers
- 1961–1962: Holyhead Town
- 1963–1964: Drogheda United
- 1964–1967: T.E.K. United
- 1967–1968: St. Patrick's Athletic
- * Club domestic league appearances and goals

Peter Desmond Farrell (16 August 1922 – 16 March 1999) was an Irish footballer who played as a right-half for, among others, Shamrock Rovers, Everton and Tranmere Rovers. As an international, Farrell also played for both Ireland teams – the FAI XI and the IFA XI. In 1949 he was a member of the FAI XI that defeated England 2–0 at Goodison Park, becoming the first non-UK team to beat England at home. Farrell's playing career followed a similar path to that of Tommy Eglington. As well as teaming up at international level, they also played together at three clubs.

== Club career ==
=== Shamrock Rovers ===
Farrell was born and raised in the Convent Road area of Dalkey and was educated at Harold Boy's National School and the Christian Brothers in Dún Laoghaire, which he won a scholarship to. He was playing football with Cabinteely Schoolboys when spotted by a Shamrock Rovers scout and subsequently joined Rovers on his 17th birthday in August 1939. Among his early team-mates was the veteran Jimmy Dunne. With a team that also included Jimmy Kelly, Tommy Eglington, Jimmy McAlinden and Paddy Coad, Farrell later helped Rovers reach three successive FAI Cup finals. They won the competition in 1944 and 1945 and finished as runners up in 1946.

=== Everton ===
In July 1946, together with Tommy Eglington, Farrell signed for Everton. In eleven seasons with the club he played 421 league games and scored 14 goals. He also played a further 31 games in the FA Cup and scored a further 4 goals. In 1951 he was appointed Everton captain and during the 1953–54 season he led them to the runners up place in the Second Division, thus gaining promotion to the First Division. During his time with the club his teammates, apart from Eglington, also included Alex Stevenson, Peter Corr, Harry Catterick, Wally Fielding, Tommy E. Jones, Brian Labone and Dave Hickson. He was never sent off during his spell at Goodison Park.

=== Later years ===
Farrell left Everton in October 1957 and followed Tommy Eglington to Tranmere Rovers where he became player-manager. He played 114 league games for Tranmere, before leaving in December 1960. After a spell as manager at Sligo Rovers, Farrell became manager of Holyhead Town and, helped by a number of former Everton and Tranmere players, he guided them to the Welsh League (North) title.

In September 1967, Farrell signed a one-year contract to manage St. Patrick's Athletic F.C. .

He managed Pats in their 1967–68 Inter-Cities Fairs Cup ties against FC Girondins de Bordeaux but resigned in March 1968.

He also managed his own insurance business and in the 1980s he had a shoe shop in George's Street, Dún Laoghaire.

== Ireland international ==
When Farrell began his international career in 1946 there were, in effect, two Ireland teams, chosen by two rival associations. Both associations, the Northern Ireland–based IFA and the Ireland–based FAI claimed jurisdiction over the whole of Ireland and selected players from the whole island. As a result, several notable Irish players from this era, including Farrell, played for both teams.

=== FAI XI ===
Farrell made 28 appearances and scored three goals for the FAI XI. While still at Shamrock Rovers, he captained the FAI XI on his international debut on 16 June 1946, against Portugal. On 21 September 1949, together with Johnny Carey and Con Martin, he was a member of the FAI XI that defeated England 2–0 at Goodison Park, becoming the first non-UK team to beat England at home. After Martin had put the FAI XI ahead with a penalty in the 33rd minute, Farrell made victory certain in the 85th minute. Tommy O'Connor slipped the ball to Farrell and as the English goalkeeper Bert Williams advanced, Farrell lofted the ball into the unguarded net. He scored his second goal for the FAI XI on 9 October 1949 a in 1–1 draw with Finland, a qualifier for the 1950 FIFA World Cup. His third goal came on 30 May 1951 as Farrell scored the opening goal in a 3–2 win against Norway.

=== IFA XI ===
Farrell also made seven appearances for the IFA XI between 1946 and 1949. On 27 November 1946 he made his debut for the IFA XI in a 0–0 draw with Scotland. Together with Johnny Carey, Con Martin, Bill Gorman, Tommy Eglington, Alex Stevenson and Davy Walsh, he was one of seven players born in the Irish Free State to play for the IFA XI that day. The draw helped the team finish as runners-up in the 1947 British Home Championship. Farrell also helped the IFA XI gain some other respectable results, including a 2–0 win against Scotland on 4 October 1947 and a 2–2 draw with England at Goodison Park on 5 November 1947.

== Sources ==
- Tony Matthews (2004). Who's Who of Everton.
- Sean Ryan (1997). The Boys in Green – The FAI International Story.
