= Peter Corr =

Irish footballer (1923-2001)

Personal information
- Full name: Peter Joseph Corr
- Date of birth: 23 June 1923
- Place of birth: Dundalk, County Louth, Irish Free State
- Date of death: 27 May 2001 (aged 77)
- Place of death: Goosnargh, Lancashire, England
- Position: Outside right

Senior career*
| Years | Team | Apps | (Gls) |
| 1939–1947 | Dundalk | 22 | (0) |
| 1947–1948 | Preston North End | 3 | (0) |
| 1948–1949 | Everton | 24 | (2) |
| 1949–1952 | Bangor City | | |
| 1952–1953 | Wigan Athletic | 34 | (11) |

International career
| 1949 | Ireland | 4 | (0) |
- * Club domestic league appearances and goals

Peter Joseph Corr (23 June 1923 – 27 May 2001) was an Irish footballer. Corr played as an outside-right for, among others, Everton and Ireland. In 1949 he was a member of the Ireland team that defeated England 2–0 at Goodison Park, becoming the first non-UK team to beat England at home.

He was the uncle of Jim, Sharon, Caroline and Andrea Corr who make up the Irish musical group The Corrs. His brother Gerry was their father. After a three-year-long battle with Alzheimer's disease, Corr died in a nursing home in Goosnargh in June 2001, aged 77.

== Playing career ==
=== Club career ===
Corr played Gaelic football as a youth for his local club Seán O'Mahony's and his home county of Louth. At the age of 20 he won a prestigious Leinster Senior Football Championship medal when Louth beat Laois in the 1943 provincial final, scoring 1-08 from his left half-forward position. In a 2000 poll he was nominated as one of the best ever Louth gaelic footballers. He played soccer for his hometown club Dundalk before signing for Preston North End in April 1947 for a fee of £2,500. However his appearances for Preston were limited by the form of Tom Finney and he only made three league appearances for Preston before joining Everton in August 1948. He made his league debut for Everton against Stoke City in September 1948. While at Everton he made 24 appearances and scored 2 goals. His teammates at the club included fellow Irish internationals Peter Farrell, Tommy Eglington and Alex Stevenson, and future Everton manager Harry Catterick. After leaving Everton, Corr went on to play for Bangor City and Wigan Athletic. During the 1952–53 season he played 34 games and scored 11 goals for Wigan in the Lancashire Combination. He was instrumental in Wigan winning the Combination and three cups during that season.

=== Irish international ===
While playing for Everton, Corr was capped four times for Ireland. He made his debut for Ireland on 22 May 1949 in a 1–0 win against Portugal at Dalymount Park. The following month on 12 June 1949 he also played in the 4–1 defeat to Spain, again at Dalymount Park. His third game for Ireland was as a member of the Ireland team that defeated England 2–0 at Goodison Park, becoming the first non-UK team to beat England at home. His last game for Ireland, on 13 November 1949, was a qualifier for the 1950 FIFA World Cup. Ireland lost the game 3–1 to Sweden.

== Later years ==
After retiring as a player, Corr settled in Preston where he opened a newsagent in Water Lane with fellow former Preston N.E. player Frank O'Farrell, later to become manager at Manchester United. He then opened Corr's Hardware Shop on Sharoe Green Lane with his wife, Doreen Melling, whom he had married in 1947. They had four children: two sons, Peter Jr. and Francis, and two daughters, Susan and Patricia. Peter Corr worked as a scout for Everton and in 1967 helped persuade Howard Kendall to move from Preston N.E. to Everton.

== Honours ==
Wigan Athletic

- Lancashire Combination: 1
  - 1952–53
- Lancashire Combination Cup: 1
  - 1952–53
- Lancashire Junior Cup: 1
  - 1952–53
- Makerfield Cup
  - 1952–53

== Sources ==
- Who's Who of Everton (2004): Tony Matthews
