= Reg Ryan =

Irish footballer

Personal information
- Full name: Reginald Alphonso Ryan
- Date of birth: 30 October 1925
- Place of birth: Dublin, Ireland
- Date of death: 13 February 1997 (aged 71)
- Place of death: Sheldon, West Midlands, England
- Positions: Wing half; inside forward

Youth career
- Marino School, Dublin (gaelic football)
- Blackpool Boys
- Claremont Juniors
- Sunbeam Cars
- Jaguar Cars

Senior career*
Years	Team	Apps	(Gls)
- Nuneaton Borough
1943–1945	Coventry City	(wartime)	
1945–1955	West Bromwich Albion	234	(28)
1955–1958	Derby County	133	(30)
1958–1960	Coventry City	65	(9)

International career
1949–1955	Ireland (FAI)	16	(3)
1950	Ireland (IFA)	1	(0)
- * Club domestic league appearances and goals

Reginald Alphonso Ryan (30 October 1925 – 13 February 1997) was an Irish footballer who played for West Bromwich Albion, Derby County and Coventry City. Ryan was also a dual international, playing for both Ireland teams – the FAI XI and the IFA XI. He was the last player to represent both teams. He was more of a goal creator than a goalscorer.

== Club career ==
=== Early years ===
Ryan initially played gaelic football for the Marino School in Dublin while growing up, but then switched to soccer after moving to Blackpool during the early years of the Second World War. He then played with Claremount School, Blackpool Boys, various factory teams and had trials with both Sheffield United and Nottingham Forest before joining Nuneaton Borough.

=== Coventry City ===
Ryan had two spells with Coventry City. In April 1943 he signed for the club as an amateur and during the 1942–43 season he played 2 games in wartime regional leagues. He then turned professional in August 1944 and made a further 4 appearances for the club during the 1944–45 wartime season. After playing for West Bromwich Albion and Derby County, he returned to City in September 1958. He then helped the club win promotion from the newly formed Division Four, after they finished as runners-up in 1959. During his second spell with City he played 70 times in all competitions.

=== West Bromwich Albion ===
In April 1945 Ryan signed for West Bromwich Albion and during the 1945–46 season, he made 17 appearances in the Football League South. He made his debut for the club against Millwall in November 1945. Together with Davy Walsh and Jackie Vernon, he helped West Brom gain promotion to the First Division in 1949. In 1954, together with Ronnie Allen and Frank Griffin, he was also a member of the West Brom team that finished as First Division runners-up and FA Cup winners. He also helped West Brom gain a share of the FA Charity Shield when he scored in a 4–4 draw with Wolves.

=== Derby County ===
Ryan signed for Derby County in June 1955 for a fee of £3,000. He was appointed team captain by manager Harry Storer and during his three seasons with the club missed only three matches – two because of injury one because of international duty. He was a member of the side promoted as champions of the Third Division North to the Football League Second Division in 1956–57. In 1955 he also played for an English Division Three North XI against an English Division Three South XI. Ryan played 133 league games for County, scoring 30 goals. He also played a further 6 games for the club in the FA Cup, scoring a further goal.

== Irish international ==
When Ryan began his international career in 1949 there were, in effect, two Ireland teams, chosen by two rival associations. Both associations, the Northern Ireland – based IFA and the Ireland – based FAI claimed jurisdiction over the whole of Ireland and selected players from the whole island. As a result, several notable Irish players from this era, including Ryan, played for both teams.

=== FAI XI ===
Between 1949 and 1955 Ryan made 16 appearances and scored 3 goals for the FAI XI. He made his debut in a 3–1 defeat to Sweden on 13 November 1949 in a qualifier for the 1950 World Cup. He scored his first two goals for the FAI XI in October 1953 during the qualifiers for the 1954 World Cup, one against France in a 5–3 defeat and the second, a penalty, against Luxembourg in 4–0 win. On 7 November 1954 in a friendly against Norway, he scored his third goal, again from the penalty spot, and earned the FAI XI a 2–1 victory. He made his last appearance for the FAI XI on 27 November 1955 in a 2–2 draw with Spain.

=== IFA XI ===
Ryan made his one and only appearance for the IFA XI in a 0–0 draw with Wales on 8 March 1950. As well as being part of the 1950 British Home Championship, the game also doubled up as a qualifier for the 1950 World Cup. Ryan, together with Con Martin, Davy Walsh and Tom Aherne, was one of four players born in the Irish Free State, included in the IFA XI that day. Ryan had earlier played for the FAI XI in the same competition, and as a result had played for two different teams in the same FIFA World Cup tournament. This situation eventually led to intervention by FIFA and as a result Ryan became one of the last four Irish Free State – born players to play for the IFA XI.

== Later years ==
After retiring as a player in November 1960, Ryan worked as a pools supervisor for both Coventry City (1960–1961) and West Bromwich Albion (1961–1962). Between September 1962 and October 1976 he was chief scout for West Brom. He later worked as a scout for various clubs including Aston Villa, Derby County, Hereford United and Leeds United before retiring in 1994.

== Honours ==
West Bromwich Albion

- FA Cup: 1953–54

Derby County

* Third Division North: 1956-57
