= Tommy Eglington =

Irish footballer (1923–2004)

- Eglington c. 1959

Personal information
- Full name: Thomas Joseph Eglington
- Date of birth: 15 January 1923
- Place of birth: Donnycarney, County Dublin, Ireland
- Date of death: 18 February 2004 (aged 81)
- Place of death: Raheny, County Dublin, Ireland
- Height: 1.69 m (5 ft 7 in)
- Position: Outside left

Youth career
- Munster Victoria
- 1942: Distillery (Dublin)

Senior career*
Years	Team	Apps	(Gls)
1942–1946	Shamrock Rovers	?	(17)
1946–1957	Everton	394	(76)
1957–1961	Tranmere Rovers	172	(36)
1961–1963	Cork Hibernians	37	(6)

International career
1946–1955	Ireland (FAI)	24	(2)
1946–1948	Ireland (IFA)	6	(0)
1961–1963	League of Ireland XI	4	(1)
- * Club domestic league appearances and goals

Thomas Joseph Eglington (15 January 1923 – 18 February 2004) was an Irish footballer who played as an outside-left for, among others, Shamrock Rovers, Everton and Tranmere Rovers. Eglington was also a dual internationalist and played for both Ireland teams – the FAI XI and the IFA XI.

Eglington's playing career followed a similar path to that of Peter Farrell. As well as teaming up at international level, they also played together at three clubs. Eglington was best known as a creator of chances, for his acceleration down the wing and for his ability to deliver a precise pass at speed. He also possessed a powerful shot. He remains one of Everton's all-time top scorers and has played more games in the Second Division than any other Everton player.

== Club career ==
=== Shamrock Rovers ===
Before joining Rovers, Eglington played as a junior with both Munster Victoria and Distillery and helped the latter club win the FAI Junior Cup in 1941–42. He then joined Shamrock Rovers where together with Peter Farrell, Jimmy McAlinden and Paddy Coad, he helped Rovers reach three successive FAI Cup finals. They won the competition in 1944 and 1945 and finished as runners up in 1946. In June 1946 Eglington also made his debut for the FAI XI while at Rovers. He won his first two caps while a Rovers player.

=== Everton ===
In July 1946, together with Peter Farrell, Eglington signed for Everton. In September 1946 he made his League debut for the club in a 3–2 home win against Arsenal. In eleven seasons at Everton he played 394 league games and scored 76 goals. He also played a further 34 games and scored a further 12 goals in the FA Cup. During his time with Everton his teammates, apart from Farrell, also included Alex Stevenson, Peter Corr, Harry Catterick, Wally Fielding, Tommy E. Jones, and Dave Hickson.

Eglington's most prolific scoring season came in 1952–53 when he scored 16 times, 14 in the Second Division and 2 in the FA Cup. On 27 September 1952, he scored 5 of these goals in just one game at Goodison Park against Doncaster Rovers, helping Everton to a 7–1 win. He also reached double figures in both 1953–54 and 1955–56. During the 1953–54 season his goals helped Everton finish as runners up in the Second Division, thus gaining promotion to the First Division.

=== Tranmere Rovers ===
In June 1957 Eglington signed for Tranmere Rovers and three months later he was followed there by Peter Farrell. He spent three seasons at Rovers making 172 league appearances and scoring 36 goals. He also played a further 9 games and scored a further 4 goals for Rovers in the FA Cup. In August 1959 Eglington scored a hat-trick for Rovers in a 5–1 win over Accrington Stanley.

=== Cork Hibernians ===
In 1961 Eglington signed for Cork Hibernians. He spent two seasons at Hibs and helped them reach the 1963 FAI Cup final where they lost 2–0 to Shelbourne. While at Hibs he also played four times for the League of Ireland XI at veteran age of 38. In a memorable game in Bristol he scored in a 5–2 defeat to an English League XI team that was the nucleus of the England team that won the 1966 World Cup.

== International career ==
When Eglington began his international career in 1946 there were, in effect, two Ireland teams, chosen by two rival associations. Both associations, the Northern Ireland – based IFA and the Republic of Ireland – based FAI claimed jurisdiction over the whole of Ireland and selected players from the whole island. As a result, several notable Irish players from this era, including Eglington, played for both teams.

It is notable that Eglington only won 24 caps for the Republic of Ireland but was awarded with the customary statuette normally reserved for those reaching 25 caps.

=== FAI XI ===
Between 1946 and 1955 Eglington made 24 appearances and scored 2 goals for the FAI XI. He made his international debut on 16 June 1946 against Portugal. Eglington scored his first goal for the FAI XI in a 4–0 win against Austria on 25 March 1953. He captained the FAI XI during the qualifying rounds for the 1954 FIFA World Cup and, during the same competition, he scored his second goal in a 4–0 win against Luxembourg on 28 October 1953. Eglington played his last game for the FAI XI on 27 November 1955, in a 2–2 draw with Spain.

=== IFA XI ===
Eglington also made 6 appearances for the IFA XI between 1946 and 1948. On 27 November 1946, he made his debut for the IFA XI in a 0–0 draw with Scotland. Together with Johnny Carey, Con Martin, Bill Gorman, Peter Farrell, Alex Stevenson and Davy Walsh, he was one of seven players born in the Irish Free State to play for the IFA XI that day. The draw helped the team finish as runners-up in the 1947 British Home Championship. Eglington also helped the IFA XI gain some other respectable results, including a 2–0 win against Scotland on 4 October 1947, and a 2–2 draw with England at Goodison Park on 5 November 1947.
