= Peter Desmond =

Irish footballer

Personal information
- Full name: Peter Desmond
- Date of birth: 23 November 1926
- Place of birth: Cork, Ireland
- Date of death: July 1990 (aged 63)
- Position: Forward

Youth career
- Richmond Celtic

Senior career*
Years	Team	Apps	(Gls)
1947–1948	Waterford United		
1948–1949	Shelbourne	14	(2)
1949–1950	Middlesbrough	2	(0)
1950–1951	Southport	12	(2)
1951–1952	York City	1	(0)
1952–1953	Stockton		
1953–1954	Hartlepool United	1	(0)

International career
1949	Ireland	4	(0)
- * Club domestic league appearances and goals

Peter Desmond (23 November 1926 in Cork, Ireland – July 1990) was an Irish footballer. Desmond played for several clubs in the League of Ireland and the English League. As an international, Desmond also played for Ireland.

Desmond made all four appearances for Ireland while playing for Middlesbrough. He made his international debut in a 3–0 win against Finland on 8 September 1949 at Dalymount Park in a World Cup qualifier.

Desmond was also a member of the Ireland team that defeated England 2–0 at Goodison Park, becoming the first non-UK team to beat England at home. Ireland took the lead in the 33rd minute when Desmond, after collecting a pass from Tommy O'Connor, was brought down in the England penalty area; Con Martin then converted the subsequent penalty kick.

Desmond made just two more international appearances for Ireland. They came on 9 October 1949 in a 1–1 draw with Finland and on 13 November 1949 in 3–1 defeat to Sweden. Both these games were World Cup qualifiers.

== Sources ==
- The Boys In Green - The FAI International Story (1997): Sean Ryan
