= Tommy Moroney =

Irish footballer and rugby union player

Personal information
- Full name: Thomas Moroney
- Date of birth: 10 November 1923
- Place of birth: Cork, Ireland
- Date of death: 2 May 1981 (aged 57)
- Positions: Wing half; centre forward

Senior career*
Years	Team	Apps	(Gls)
- Cork Constitution (rugby)
194x–1947	Cork United		
1947–1953	West Ham United	148	(8)
1953–195x	Evergreen United		

International career
- Munster (rugby)
1948–1953	Ireland	12	(1)

Managerial career
- 1961–1964: Cork Hibernians
- * Club domestic league appearances and goals

Tommy Moroney (10 November 1923 – 2 May 1981) was an Irish soccer and rugby union player. Moroney played soccer for Cork United, West Ham United, Evergreen United and Ireland. In 1949 he was a member of the Ireland team that defeated England 2–0 at Goodison Park, becoming the first non-UK team to beat England at home. He also represented both Cork Constitution and Munster at rugby union.

== Early years in Cork ==
Together with Frank O'Farrell, Moroney was a member of the successful Cork United team of the 1940s, helping them win several League of Ireland titles. A brilliant all-round sportsman, Moroney had also played rugby union for Presentation Brothers College and Cork Constitution, helping the latter to win the Munster Senior Cup three times. He also represented Munster, but with the Five Nations Championship suspended because of the Second World War, he never got the chance to play for the Ireland national rugby union team.

== West Ham United ==
Moroney moved to West Ham United in 1947, making his debut in the English Second Division on 1 September 1947 against Millwall. In January 1948 he was joined at the Hammers by his former Cork United teammate, Frank O'Farrell. Moroney played 148 league games for the Hammers, scoring 8 goals. He also played a further three games for the club in the FA Cup. He played his last game for West Ham on 3 April 1953 in a 2–1 defeat against Fulham. He subsequently returned to Cork where he finished his playing career with Evergreen United.

== Irish international ==
Moroney made 12 appearances for Ireland between 1948 and 1953. He scored his only goal for Ireland, on his international debut, in a 2–1 away defeat against Spain on 30 May 1948. He was also a member of the Ireland team that defeated England 2–0 at Goodison Park, becoming the first non-UK team to beat England at home. He played his last game for Ireland on 4 October 1953 against France in a World Cup qualifier.

== Honours ==
Rugby Player

Cork Constitution

- Munster Senior Cup
  - Winners 1942, 1943 1946 3

Soccer Player

Cork United

- League of Ireland
  - Winners 1941, 1942, 1943, 1945, 1946 5
- FAI Cup
  - Winners 1942, 1947 2
- League of Ireland Shield
  - Winners 1943 1
- Munster Senior Cup
  - Winners 1941, 1945, 1946, 1947 4

== See also ==
- List of players who have converted from one football code to another

== Bibliography ==
- Hogg, Tony (2005). Who's Who of West Ham United. Profile Sports Media. p. 149. ISBN 1-903135-50-8.
- Ryan, Sean (1997). The Boys in Green: The FAI International Story. Mainstream. ISBN 978-1-85158-939-5.
