= Con Martin =

Irish footballer (1923–2013)

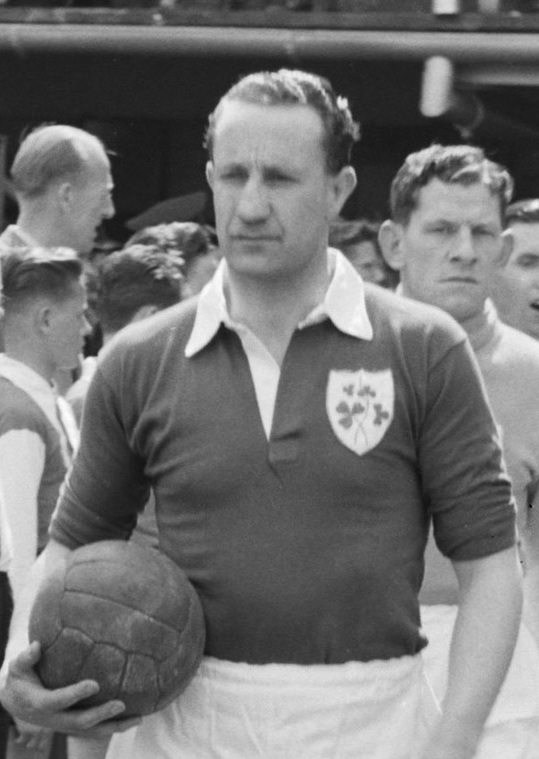
- Martin in 1956

Personal information
- Full name: Cornelius Joseph Martin
- Date of birth: 20 March 1923
- Place of birth: Rush, County Dublin, Ireland
- Date of death: 24 February 2013 (aged 89)
- Height: 6 ft 1 in (1.85 m)
- Positions: Centre-half; goalkeeper; utility player

Senior career*
Years	Team	Apps	(Gls)
1941	Dublin county team (Gaelic football)		
1941–1946	Drumcondra	76	(7)
1946–1947	Glentoran	11	(1)
1947–1948	Leeds United	47	(1)
1948–1956	Aston Villa	194	(1)
1956–1959	Waterford		(12)
1959–1960	Dundalk		

International career
1946	League of Ireland XI		
1946–1956	Ireland (FAI)	30	(6)
1946–1950	Ireland (IFA)	6	(0)

Managerial career
- 1959–60: Dundalk
- 1965: Shelbourne
- 1960s: Cork Hibernians (assistant)
- * Club domestic league appearances and goals

Cornelius Joseph Martin (20 March 1923 – 24 February 2013) was an Irish footballer. Martin initially played Gaelic football for the Dublin county team before switching codes and embarking on a successful soccer career, playing for, among others, Drumcondra, Glentoran, Leeds United and Aston Villa.

Martin was also a dual international and played and captained both Ireland teams – the FAI XI and the IFA XI. In 1949 he was a member of the FAI XI that defeated England 2–0 at Goodison Park, a feat that is often cited as the first non-UK team to beat England at home, although the team that day contained several players that were also capped by Northern Ireland due to the selection policy followed by both teams at the time.

Martin, nicknamed Mr. Versatility, played in nearly every position during his soccer career. Although he played mainly as a centre-half, the ball-handling skills he developed playing Gaelic football also made him a very useful goalkeeper. He actually made his international debut with the FAI XI as a goalkeeper and despite turning down the chance to sign for Manchester United as a goalkeeper, he later played nearly a whole season in goal for Aston Villa.

== Gaelic footballer ==
Martin played Gaelic football in his youth for St Maurs GAA club in Rush, County Dublin, and was called into the senior Dublin county panel aged just 18. On 9 November 1941, he helped Dublin win the Leinster title, partnering Joe Fitzgerald of Geraldines in midfield in the final against Carlow. However at the same time as playing for Dublin, he was also playing soccer for Drumcondra. When this was discovered, the Gaelic Athletic Association, which maintained a ban on foreign sports, expelled Martin and withheld his winners medal. He eventually received the medal in 1971, after the ban was lifted. Martin is one of several notable Dublin footballers to have successfully switched codes. Others include Jack Kirwan, Val Harris and Kevin Moran.

== Club career ==
=== Early years ===
Martin was introduced to soccer while serving in the Irish Air Corps and subsequently signed for Drumcondra. It was at Drums that early signs of his versatility emerged. While helping the club win the FAI Cup, he covered most of the defensive positions and centre-half role. After playing for a League of Ireland XI against an Irish League XI in March 1946 he was signed by Glentoran who then bought him out of the Air Corps. He subsequently made 22 appearances and scored 1 goal for the Glens. It was while playing for the Glens that he made his debut for both FAI XI as a goalkeeper and as a defender for the IFA XI.

=== Leeds United ===
In 1946 when Manchester United were searching for a goalkeeper, fellow Irish international, Johnny Carey recommended Martin to Matt Busby. However, he turned down Busby in favour of joining Leeds United as an outfield player. He joined Leeds in December 1946 for a fee of £8,000 and under manager Major Frank Buckley he made 47 English League appearances. He also played a further two games in the FA Cup. At Leeds, Martin played as a left-back, centre-half, left-half and inside-forward. He scored his only goal for the club on 6 December 1947 at Elland Road in a league game against West Ham United.

=== Aston Villa ===
In September 1948 Martin was signed by Aston Villa for a fee of £10,000. He was immediately installed in the centre-half position but during his first season played a few games at right-back. He missed only two games during the 1949–50 season and was a permanent fixture in defence for two-thirds of the 1950–51 season before injury sidelined him for two months.

Martin started the 1951–52 season as a left-back, but after goalkeeper Joe Rutherford was injured and the club was caught without cover he took over duties between the posts. He made 26 league appearances and 1 FA Cup appearance as a goalkeeper for Villa before reverting to the centre-half position. Between 1948 and 1956 Martin made 213 appearances for Villa, 194 in the league and 19 in cup games. Martin scored just once for Villa – a penalty in a 4–1 league win at Charlton Athletic in April 1950.

=== League of Ireland ===
In July 1956 Martin left Villa to sign for Waterford United.

In December 1959 he accepted the position of player-manager at Dundalk.

== Irish international ==
When Martin began his international career in 1946 there were, in effect, two Ireland teams, chosen by two rival associations. Both associations, the Northern Ireland – based IFA and the Republic of Ireland – based FAI claimed jurisdiction over the whole of Ireland and selected players from the whole island. As a result, several notable Irish players from this era, including Martin, played for both teams.

=== FAI XI ===
Between 1946 and 1956 Martin made 30 appearances and scored 6 goals for the FAI XI. He made his debut during a tour of Iberia in June 1946. After half an hour of the first game on 16 June against Portugal, with the Irish already trailing 3–0, goalkeeper Ned Courtney was injured and the selectors put Martin in goal. He kept a clean sheet, the Irish eventually losing 3–1. As a result, Martin retained his place for the game against Spain on 23 June. Labelled the Yellow Canary by the Spanish media because of the colour of his jersey, Martin put in an outstanding display and against a Spanish team that included César, Agustín Gaínza, Panizo, Gonzalvo III and Zarra, he kept another clean sheet. At the other end of the field, a goal by Paddy Sloan gave the Irish a surprise 1–0 victory. He won his third cap on 30 September 1946 when he was a member of the first ever FAI XI to play against England. Despite a credible performance, the FAI XI lost 1–0.

His best year in international football came in 1949, when he scored five of his six goals for the FAI XI, including four in three successive internationals. On 12 June he scored a penalty in a 4–1 home defeat to Spain. Then on 8 September in a qualifier for the 1950 FIFA World Cup against Finland, playing a centre-forward, he scored twice. The first was another penalty and second was headed in from a corner. On 21 September, together with Johnny Carey and Peter Farrell, he was a member of the FAI XI that defeated England 2–0 at Goodison Park, becoming the first non-UK team to beat England at home. Martin scored the opener, once again from the penalty spot, after Peter Desmond was brought down in the box. He scored his fifth goal, yet another penalty, in a 3–1 defeat to Sweden in another World Cup qualifier. On 10 May 1950 he captained the FAI XI in a 5–1 defeat to Belgium. He scored his last goal for the FAI XI in a 2–1 win against Norway in a friendly on 7 November 1954.

=== IFA XI ===
Martin also made 6 appearances for the IFA XI between 1946 and 1950. On 27 November 1946 he made his debut for the IFA XI in a 0–0 draw with Scotland. Together with Johnny Carey, Peter Farrell, Bill Gorman, Tommy Eglington, Alex Stevenson and Davy Walsh, he was one of seven players born in the Irish Free State to play for the IFA XI that day. The draw helped the team finish as runners-up in the 1947 British Home Championship. Martin helped the IFA XI gain some more respectable results, including a 2–0 win against Scotland on 4 October 1947 and a 2–2 draw with England at Goodison Park on 5 November 1947.

Martin made his last appearance for the IFA XI in a 0–0 draw with Wales on 8 March 1950. As well as being part of the 1950 British Home Championship, the game also doubled up as a qualifier for the 1950 FIFA World Cup. Martin, together with Davy Walsh, Reg Ryan and Tom Aherne, was one of four players Free State-born players, included in the IFA XI that day and as a result he played for two different associations in the same FIFA World Cup tournament. This situation eventually led to intervention by FIFA and as a result Martin became one of the last four Free State -born players to play for IFA XI.

== Family ==
Martin was the founding member of a notable Irish footballing family. During the 1970s his son Mick Martin played for, among others, Manchester United, Newcastle United, West Bromwich Albion and the Republic of Ireland. Another son, Con Martin Jr. played for several clubs in the League of Ireland. His daughter Mary married Gerry Garvan who also played in the League of Ireland. Martin Sr. later worked as an insurance broker and formed a company, Martin & Garvan Insurances Ltd., with his son-in-law. The Garvans' son and Martin's grandson, Owen Garvan, formerly played for Crystal Palace and has played with the Republic of Ireland U21s. as well as the Republic of Ireland B team in a game against Nottingham Forest

== Honours ==
Gaelic footballer

Dublin

- Leinster Champions: 1941

Soccer player

Drumcondra

- FAI Cup: 1946

Ireland

- British Home Championship runners up: 1946–47
