= Tommy Jones (footballer, born 1930) =

English footballer

Tommy E Jones
Personal information
- Full name: Thomas Edwin Jones
- Date of birth: 11 April 1930
- Place of birth: Liverpool, England
- Date of death: 5 June 2010 (aged 80)
- Position: Centre half

Youth career
- 1944–1948: Everton

Senior career*
Years	Team	Apps	(Gls)
1948–1961	Everton	383	(14)
1963	Toronto Italia		
1964-1966	Colwyn Bay		

Managerial career
- 1963: Toronto Italia (player-coach)
- 1965-1966: Colwyn Bay
- * Club domestic league appearances and goals

Thomas Edwin Jones (11 April 1930 – 5 June 2010), known as Tommy E Jones or T. E. Jones to distinguish him from T. G. Jones, was an English footballer who played for Everton from 1950 until 1961.

Jones signed for Everton straight from school and turned professional in 1948. He began his Everton career as a full back, but moved to centre half to replace T. G. Jones in the 1950–51 season, making his debut against Arsenal on 6 September 1950. Jones established himself as a "model of consistency", a "most reliable and unruffled" defender, and in 1957 he took over the Goodison captaincy, succeeding Peter Farrell who had left the club. He returned to left-back towards the end of his career, replaced at centre-half by a young Brian Labone. He was forced to retire due to a shattered kneecap, having scored 14 goals from 411 appearances during an 11-year senior career with Everton. In 1963, he signed with Toronto Italia of the Eastern Canada Professional Soccer League as a player-coach. He spent a spell with Colwyn Bay which included a stint as player-manager.

Jones never played full international football, but was part of the Football Association's team that toured Nigeria and Ghana in 1958. He was a member of the England Youth team that beat Scotland Youth 4–2 in October 1947 in a match played at Belle Vue, Doncaster.

After retiring from football, Jones worked for Littlewoods in Liverpool.

Sporting positions
Preceded by Peter Farrell	Everton captain 1957-1961	Succeeded by Roy Vernon
