= Wally Fielding =

English footballer and manager

Personal information
- Full name: Alfred Walter Fielding
- Date of birth: 26 November 1919
- Place of birth: London, England
- Date of death: 18 January 2008 (aged 88)
- Place of death: Cornwall, England
- Position: Inside forward

Youth career
- Charlton Athletic

Senior career*
Years	Team	Apps	(Gls)
1945–1959	Everton	380	(49)
1959–1960	Southport	20	(1)

Managerial career
- 1959–1960: Southport
- * Club domestic league appearances and goals

Wally Fielding (26 November 1919 – 18 January 2008) was a professional footballer from 1945 until 1960.

In 1945, after leaving the Army, Fielding was signed by Everton manager Theo Kelly having been a youth amateur player for Charlton Athletic

Known for his passing precision, reading of the game and his ability to beat defenders he was the start of many an Everton attack. His trademark he became known for was laying in a perfectly weighted ball inside the full back to his flying winger Tommy Eglington. In his Everton career, he played 410 first-team games and scored 54 times.

In 1959, at the age of 39, he left for Southport, playing 20 games for the seaside club and scoring one goal.

Following retirement, Fielding settled in Cornwall. He died at his home there on 18 January 2008. He had been Everton's oldest living former player at the time.
