= Johnny Carey =

Irish footballer & manager (1919–1995)

Personal information
- Full name: John Joseph Carey
- Date of birth: 23 February 1919
- Place of birth: Dublin, Ireland
- Date of death: 22 August 1995 (aged 76)
- Place of death: Macclesfield, England
- Height: 1.80 m (5 ft 11 in)
- Position: Right-back

Youth career
- 193?: Home Farm
- 1935: Dublin county team (Gaelic football)

Senior career*
| Years | Team | Apps | (Gls) |
| 1936 | St James's Gate | | |
| 1936–1953 | Manchester United | 304 | (17) |
| | → Manchester United (wartime) | 112 | (47) |
| 1941–1942 | → Cardiff City (guest) | 1 | (0) |
| 1941–1942 | → Manchester City (guest) | 1 | (0) |
| 1941–1945 | → Shamrock Rovers (guest) | 2 | (3) |
| 1942–1943 | → Middlesbrough (guest) | 1 | (0) |
| 1942–1943 | → Everton (guest) | 2 | (0) |
| 194? | → Liverpool (guest) | | |
| 194? | → Played in Italy (guest) | | |

International career
| 1937–1953 | Ireland (FAI) | 29 | (3) |
| 1940 | League of Ireland XI | 1 | (0) |
| 1946–1949 | Ireland (IFA) | 9 | (0) |
| 1947 | Europe XI | 1 | (0) |

Managerial career
- 1953–1958: Blackburn Rovers
- 1955–1967: Republic of Ireland
- 1958–1961: Everton
- 1961–1963: Leyton Orient
- 1963–1968: Nottingham Forest
- 1970–1971: Blackburn Rovers
- * Club domestic league appearances and goals

John Joseph Carey (23 February 1919 – 22 August 1995) was an Irish professional footballer and manager. As a player, Carey spent most of his career at Manchester United, where he was team captain from 1946 until he retired as a player in 1953. He was also a dual internationalist, playing for and captaining both Ireland teams – the FAI XI and the IFA XI. In 1947 he also captained a Europe XI which played a Great Britain XI at Hampden Park. In 1949 he was voted the Football Writers' Association Footballer of the Year and in the same year captained the FAI XI that defeated England 2–0 at Goodison Park, becoming the first non-UK team to beat England at home. Carey was also the first non-UK player and the first Irishman to captain a winning team in both an FA Cup Final and the First Division. Like his contemporary Con Martin, Carey was an extremely versatile footballer and played in nine different positions throughout his career. He even played in goal for United on one occasion.

== Early years ==
John (also known as 'Johnny' or 'Jackie') Carey was born 23 February 1919 at 4 Adelaide Place, Lower Baggot Street, Dublin. The son of John Carey, a van driver, and Sarah Carey (née Byrne), he was educated at Westland Row Christian Brothers School. A keen sportsman, Carey was a strong swimmer and played football for Home Farm as a schoolboy. He also played Gaelic football, and was selected for the Dublin county team at minor level, before he signed for St James's Gate at the start of the 1936–37 season.

After just two months of League of Ireland football, he was spotted by Billy Behan, a Dublin-based Manchester United scout. Behan convinced the United chief scout, Louis Rocca, to check him out and in November 1936 United signed him for a then League of Ireland record fee of £250. He made his debut as an inside-left for United on 23 September 1937 against Southampton. During his first season with United, Carey, together with Harry Baird, Jack Rowley, Tommy Bamford, Tommy Breen and Stan Pearson, helped United gain promotion to the First Division.

== Second World War ==
During the Second World War, Carey continued to play for Manchester United and between 1939 and 1943 he played 112 games and scored 47 goals in the wartime regional leagues. He also played as a guest for several other clubs including Cardiff City, Manchester City, Everton, Liverpool and Middlesbrough On 28 April 1940, Carey guested for a League of Ireland XI against a Scottish Football League XI in a 3–2 defeat at Dalymount Park. His teammates on the day included Jimmy Dunne, Paddy Bradshaw and John Feenan. He also guested for Shamrock Rovers in a League of Ireland game against Limerick on 6 April 1941. He gave a good performance at inside left, scoring in a 5–0 win. He guested again for Rovers in April 1942 and scored twice in a 7–1 win against Shelbourne. He also played and scored again for Rovers in a League of Ireland Shield game at Milltown against Waterford United on 11 November 1945. Carey also served with the British Army in both Italy and the Middle East and while in Italy, he also played part-time for several different clubs using the nickname Cario. When the war ended Carey received several offers to stay on in Italy.

== Return to Manchester United ==
On his return to Manchester United, Carey began playing as a midfielder and defender. He was also appointed team captain by Matt Busby. He captained United to victory in the 1948 FA Cup final and to second place in the First Division four times before eventually winning the title in 1952. His teammates at United during this era included among others, Jack Rowley, Charlie Mitten and John Aston. During his career with United, Carey played 304 league games, scoring 17 goals. He played a further 38 games in the FA Cup and scored one further goal. Carey also played twice for United in the FA Charity Shield.

He also gained the distinction of being the first player from Ireland to win a major trophy with Manchester United.

== Irish international ==
When Carey began his international career in 1937 there were, in effect, two Ireland teams, chosen by two rival associations. Both associations, the Northern Ireland-based IFA and the Ireland-based FAI claimed jurisdiction over the whole of Ireland and selected players from the whole island. As a result, several notable Irish players from this era, including Carey played for both teams. In September 1946 Carey, along with Bill Gorman, even played for both teams within three days of each other, both times against England. On 28 September at Windsor Park he played for the IFA XI in a 7–2 defeat. Then on 30 September at Dalymount Park he played for the FAI XI in a 1–0 defeat.

=== FAI XI ===
Between 1937 and 1953 Carey made 29 appearances and scored 3 goals for the FAI XI, making his debut against Norway on 7 November 1937 in a team that also included Jimmy Dunne and fellow debutant, Kevin O'Flanagan. The game which was a qualifier for the 1938 FIFA World Cup finished as a 3–3 draw. He scored his first goal for the FAI XI in a 3–2 win against Poland on 13 November 1938 and scored his second in the very next game, a 2–2 draw with Hungary on 19 March 1939. Carey captained the XI on 19 occasions. On 21 September 1949, he was captain when an FAI XI defeated England 2–0 at Goodison Park, becoming the first non-UK team to beat England at home. Carey scored his third goal, a penalty, for the FAI XI in a 2–2 draw with Norway on 26 November 1950. He played his last game for the FAI XI on 25 March 1953 in a 4–0 win over Austria.

=== IFA XI ===
Carey also made 9 appearances for the IFA XI between 1946 and 1949. In 1946 he played in the Victory Internationals against Scotland and Wales On 27 November 1946 he played for the IFA XI in a 0–0 draw with Scotland. Together with Peter Farrell, Con Martin, Bill Gorman, Tommy Eglington, Alex Stevenson and Davy Walsh, he was one of seven players born in the Irish Free State to play for the IFA XI that day. The draw helped the team finish as runners-up in the 1947 British Home Championship.

== Coaching career ==
One of Carey's earliest experiences as a coach came when he was still an active player; he took charge of the Ireland team at the 1948 Olympics. Ireland lost 3–1 to the Netherlands in the opening round in a game played at Fratton Park. Carey retired as a player in 1953 and almost immediately accepted the position as manager of Blackburn Rovers. In 1958 he guided Rovers into First Division. He then became manager at Everton but, despite leading them to fifth place in the 1960–61 season, their highest post-war position, he was sacked in the back of a taxi by director John Moores. As a result, the jibe, 'Taxi for ...!' has become a staple insult offered to any manager facing the threat of the sack. He next managed Leyton Orient and took them into the First Division in 1962, their only season in the top division. However his greatest success as a manager came with Nottingham Forest. In 1967, he guided them to the FA Cup semi-finals and to second place in the First Division behind his former club Manchester United. Between 1955 and 1967 Carey also served as team manager of the Republic of Ireland. However Carey had very little power as the team itself was chosen by a selection committee. In October 1970, Carey returned to the manager's role at Blackburn, after a spell as administrative manager. He was sacked on 7 June 1971.

== Honours ==
Manchester United

- Football League First Division: 1951–52
- FA Cup: 1947–48
- FA Charity Shield: 1952

Individual

- FWA Footballer of the Year: 1949
- Football League 100 Legends: 1998 (inducted)
