= Robin Lawler =

Irish footballer

Joseph "Robin" Lawler (20 August 1925 – 17 April 1998) was an Irish professional footballer.

== Career ==
From Dublin, he began his career with Home Farm. He later played with Distillery F.C., Drumcondra and Transport, as well as for Drums in the FAI Cup win against Shamrock Rovers in 1946. Later he played for Belfast Celtic, with whom he won Irish Cup and league honours.

Subsequently, he moved to Fulham and played at half back on a team that included the England inside forward Johnny Haynes, Ron Greenwood and Jimmy Hill. He played 281 times for Fulham from 1949 until 1962. He won the first of his eight Ireland caps in a 4–0 win over Austria at Dalymount Park in March 1953. Lawler was known for possessing an extremely long throw-in.
