= Bert Mozley =

English footballer (1923–2019)

Personal information
- Full name: Bert Mozley
- Date of birth: 21 September 1923
- Place of birth: Derby, England
- Date of death: 28 October 2019 (aged 96)
- Place of death: Galiano Island, British Columbia, Canada
- Height: 5 ft 9 in (1.75 m)
- Position: Right back

Youth career
- Shelton United
- 1944–1945: Nottingham Forest

Senior career*
Years	Team	Apps	(Gls)
1945–1955	Derby County	297	(2)

International career
1949	England	3	(0)
- * Club domestic league appearances and goals

Bert Mozley (21 September 1923 – 28 October 2019) was an English international footballer who spent his entire professional career with hometown club Derby County. He also spent time with Shelton United and Nottingham Forest. After retiring as a player in 1955, he emigrated to Canada.

Mozley died on 28 October 2019, at the age of 96. For the last few months of his life, Mozley was the oldest-living England international footballer.
