= British Home Championship =

- The Jubilee Trophy, awarded from 1935 onward.
- Founded: 1884
- Abolished: 1984
- Region: British Isles
- Teams: 4
- Qualifier for: FIFA World Cup (1950–54); European Championship (1968)
- Related competitions: Rous Cup; 2011 Nations Cup
- Last champions: Northern Ireland (1983–84)
- Most championships: England (54 titles)

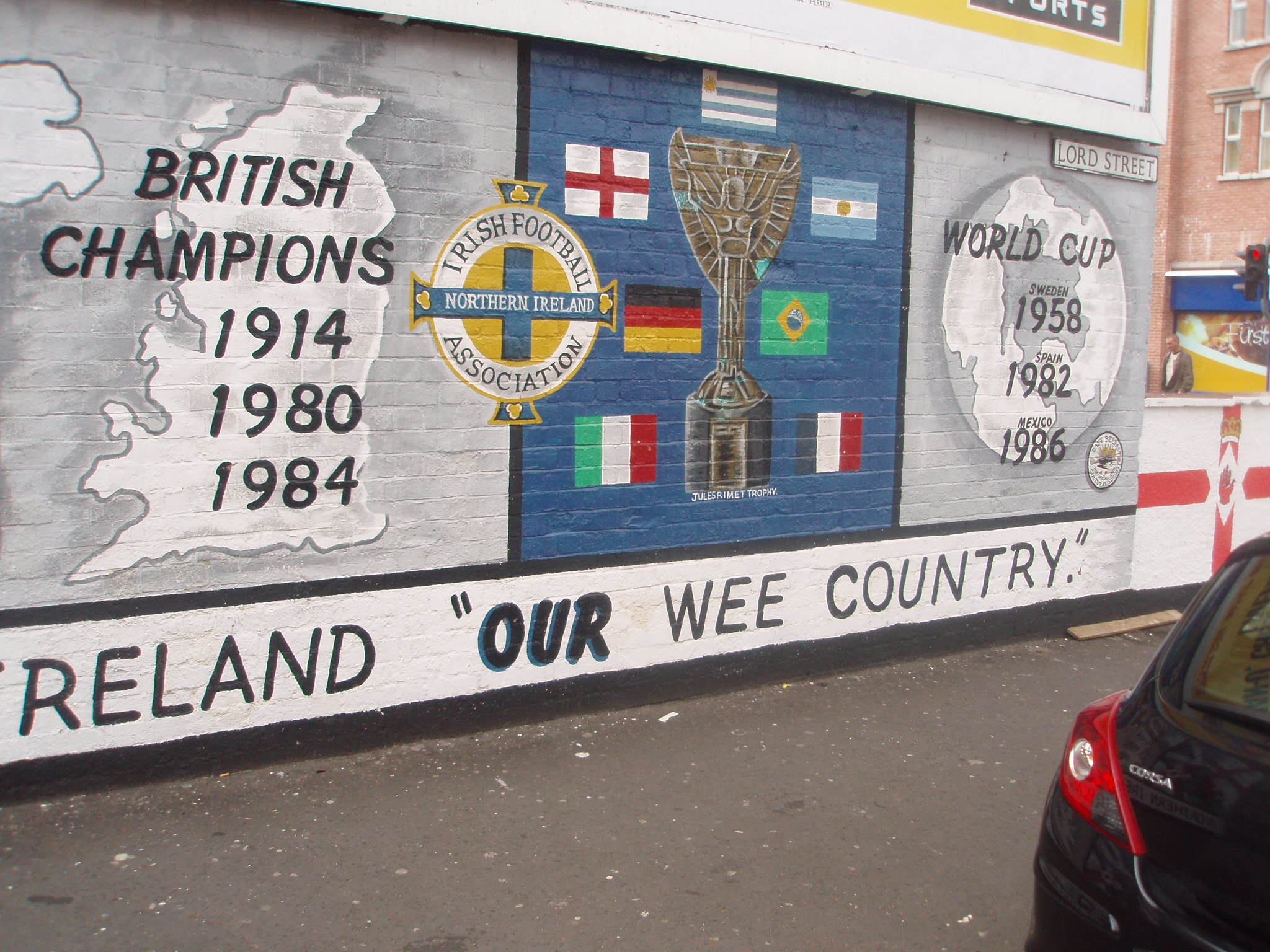
Mural in Belfast celebrating the three outright wins of the British Home Championship by (Northern) Ireland; five shared wins are ignored.

The British Home Championship (Note: Name of the Home Championship in the languages of participating countries: Home International Championship, Home Internationals, British Championship; Irish: An Comórtas Idirnáisiúnta; Scots: Hame Internaitional Kemp; Scottish Gaelic: Farpais lìg eadar-nàiseanta; Welsh: Pencampwriaeth y Pedair Gwlad) (historically known as the British International Championship or simply the International Championship) was an annual football competition contested between the United Kingdom's four national teams: England, Scotland, Wales, and Ireland (the last of whom competed as Northern Ireland starting from the late 1950s). Beginning during the 1883–84 season, it is the oldest international association football tournament in the world and it was contested until the 1983–84 season, when it was abolished after 100 years.

== History ==
=== Overview ===
The first international association football match, between Scotland and England, took place in November 1872. Following that contest, a schedule of international matches between the four home nations gradually developed, the games taking place between January and April of each year. In 1884, for the first time, all six possible matches were played. This schedule (the climax usually being the England v Scotland fixture) continued without interruption until the First World War.

Development of the international football calendar
| Year | England v Scotland | Scotland v Wales | England v Wales | England v Ireland | Wales v Ireland | Scotland v Ireland |
|---|---|---|---|---|---|---|
| 1872 | November | | | | | |
| 1873 | March | | | | | |
| 1874 | March | | | | | |
| 1875 | March | | | | | |
| 1876 | March | March | | | | |
| 1877 | March | March | | | | |
| 1878 | March | March | | | | |
| 1879 | April | April | January | | | |
| 1880 | March | March | March | | | |
| 1881 | March | March | February | | | |
| 1882 | March | March | March | February | February | |
| 1883 | March | March | February | February | March | |
| 1884 | March | March | March | February | February | January |
| 1885 | March | March | March | February | April | March |

=== Development ===
Recognition of the international season as constituting a single tournament came slowly. Early reports focused on the rivalries between the two teams in each match, rather than any overall title. Talk of a "championship" began to emerge gradually during the 1890s, with some writers suggesting the use of a league table between the nations, with 2 points for a win and 1 point for a draw (as had been in use for the Football League since 1888). By 1908 a list of "International Champions" extending all the way back to 1884 was published.

The championship, although increasingly recognised as such, had no official prize until 1935 (see below), when a trophy for the "British International Championship" was created in honour of the silver jubilee of King George V.

The dates of the fixtures varied, but they tended to bunch towards the end of the season (sometimes the entire competition was held in a few days at the end of the season), except between the World Wars, when some fixtures were played before Christmas. The rise of other international competitions, especially the World Cup and European Championships, meant that the British Home Championship lost much of its prestige as the years went on.

However, the new international tournaments meant that the Championship took on added importance in certain years. The 1949–50 and 1953–54 Championships doubled up as qualifying groups for the 1950 and 1954 World Cups respectively, and the results of the 1966–67 and 1967–68 Championships were used to determine which team would progress to the second qualifying round of Euro 1968.

The British Home Championship was discontinued after the 1983–84 competition. There were a number of reasons for the tournament's demise, including it being overshadowed by the World Cup and European Championships, falling attendances at all but the England v Scotland games, fixture congestion, the rise of hooliganism, the Troubles in Northern Ireland (civil unrest led to the 1980–81 competition being abandoned), and England's desire to play against "stronger" teams. The fate of the competition was settled when the (English) Football Association, swiftly followed by the Scottish Football Association, announced in 1983 that they would not be entering after the 1983–84 Championship. The British Home Championship trophy remains the property of the Irish FA, as Northern Ireland were the most recent champions.

The Championship was replaced by the smaller Rous Cup, which involved just England, Scotland and, in later years, an invited guest team from South America. That competition, however, ended after just five years.

Since then, there have been many proposals to resurrect the British Home Championship, with advocates pointing to rising attendances and a significant downturn in football-related violence. The Scottish, Welsh and Northern Irish football associations are keen on the idea, but the English association are less enthusiastic, claiming that they agree in principle, but that fixture congestion makes a revived tournament impractical.

Therefore, the Scottish Football Association, the Football Association of Wales and the Irish Football Association, with the Republic of Ireland's Football Association of Ireland, pressed ahead and organised a tournament similar to the British Home Championship. The Nations Cup, between Scotland, Wales, Northern Ireland and the Republic of Ireland, was launched in Dublin in 2011. It was discontinued after one tournament because of poor attendance.

== Format and rules ==
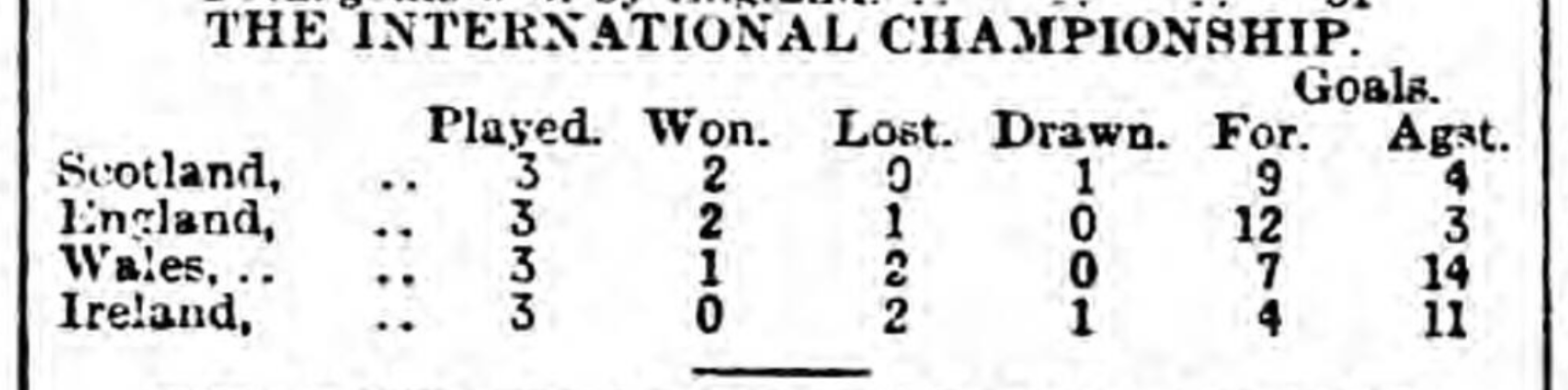
Early example of a printed league table showing the final positions of the teams (Dundee Courier, 1895–96)

Each team played every other team once (making for a total of three matches per team and six matches in total). Generally, each team played either one or two matches at home and the remainder away, with home advantage between two teams alternating each year (so if England played Scotland at home one year, they played them away the next).

A team received two points for a win, one for a draw and none for a loss. The team with the most points was declared the winner. If two or more teams were equal on points, that position in the league table was shared (as was the Championship if it occurred between the top teams). In 1956, uniquely, all teams finished with the same number of points, leading to the Championship being shared between all four home nations. From the 1978–79 Championship onwards, however, goal difference (total goals scored minus total goals conceded) was used to differentiate between teams level on points. If goal difference was equal, then total goals scored was used.

== Trophy ==
For over 50 years the tournament had no trophy. In 1935, a trophy was presented to King George V by the Football Association in recognition of the monarch's silver jubilee. It was first awarded, as the "Jubilee Trophy", to Scotland, victors of the 1935–36 competition. The trophy was of solid silver, consisting of a pedestal supporting a football surmounted by a winged figure. It bore the words "British International Championship".

As winners of the final tournament, Northern Ireland retained the trophy, but for many years had no suitable venue in which to display it. It was exhibited in the Scottish Football Museum in Glasgow and then the National Football Museum in Manchester. In 2018 it was finally put in display at the Northern Ireland Education and Heritage Centre at the National Stadium in Belfast.

== Notable moments ==
=== 1902: Tragedy at Ibrox ===
The Scotland v England match of 5 April 1902 became known as the Ibrox Disaster of 1902. The match took place at Ibrox Park (now Ibrox Stadium) in Glasgow. During the first half, a section of the terracing in the overcrowded West Stand collapsed, killing 25 and injuring over 500. Play was stopped, but was restarted after 20 minutes, with most of the crowd not knowing what had happened. The match was later declared void and replayed at Villa Park, Birmingham.

=== 1950–54: World Cup qualification ===
The 1949–50 British Home Championship was used as a qualification group for the 1950 FIFA World Cup, with the teams finishing both first and second qualifying. England and Scotland were guaranteed the top two places and World Cup qualification with one match to go, when the Scottish Football Association declared that it would only go to the 1950 World Cup if they were the British champions. Scotland played England at Hampden Park on 15 April in the final game and lost 1–0 to a goal by Chelsea's Roy Bentley. Scotland finished second and withdrew from what would have been their first-ever World Cup appearance.

The 1953–54 British Home Championship was used as a qualification group for the 1954 FIFA World Cup, with England and Scotland both qualifying.

=== 1967: Scotland become 'World Champions' ===
The 1966–67 British Home Championship was the first since England's victory at the World Cup 1966. Naturally, England were favourites for the Championship title. In the end, the outcome of the entire Championship rested on the final game: England v Scotland at Wembley Stadium in London on 15 April. If England won or drew, they would win the Championship; if Scotland won, they would triumph. Scotland beat the World Cup winners 3–2. The match was followed by a large, but relatively harmless, pitch invasion by the jubilant Scottish fans, who were quick to waggishly declare Scotland the "World Champions", as the game was England's first defeat since winning the World Cup. The Scots' joke ultimately led to the conception of the Unofficial Football World Championships.

=== 1966–68: European Football Championship qualification ===
One of the qualifying groups for the 1968 UEFA European Football Championship was formed by combining the results of the 1966–67 and 1967–68 editions of the British Home Championship. The group winners were England, who advanced to the UEFA Euro 1968 quarter-finals where they defeated Spain to qualify for the final tournament, hosted by Italy.

=== 1977: Wembley pitch invasion ===
Again, the 1976–77 Championship came down to the final game between England and Scotland at Wembley on 4 June. Scotland won the game 2–1, making them champions. As in 1967, a pitch invasion by the overjoyed Scottish fans followed, but this time vandalism ensued: the pitch was ripped up and taken back to Scotland in small pieces, along with one of the broken crossbars.

=== 1981: The unfinished Championship ===
The Troubles in Northern Ireland had affected the British Home Championship before, with things turning so hostile that Northern Ireland often had to play their "home" games in Liverpool or Glasgow. The entire 1980–81 Championship was held in May 1981, which coincided with a large amount of civil unrest in Northern Ireland surrounding the hunger strike in the Maze Prison. Northern Ireland's two home matches, against England and Wales, were not moved, so both teams refused to travel to Belfast to play. As not all the matches were completed, that year's competition was declared void with no winner; only Scotland completed all their matches. It was the only time in the Championship's history, apart from during World War I and World War II, that it was not awarded.

=== 1984: The final Championship ===
The Home Championships came to an end, with England and Scotland announcing that the 1983–84 British Home Championship would be their last. They cited waning interest in the games, crowded international fixture lists and a sharp rise in hooliganism for their decision. The final match of the competition was held at Hampden Park between Scotland and England, with either able to take the title if they won the match; however, it ended in a 1–1 draw, allowing Northern Ireland to win the Championship on goal difference after all the teams ended on three points each; Wales came second on goals scored.

== List of winners ==
Where teams finished in a joint position, the level teams are listed in order of better goal difference.

| # | Year | Champions | Second | Third | Fourth | Topscorer | Goals |
|---|---|---|---|---|---|---|---|
| 1 | 1883–84 | Scotland (1) | England | Wales | Ireland | (England) Harry Cursham | 3 |
| 2 | 1884–85 | Scotland (2) | England | Wales | Ireland | (Scotland) Joseph Lindsay | 4 |
| 3 | 1885–86 | Scotland (3) — England (1) | | Wales | Ireland | Various (Scotland) Charles Heggie (England) Benjamin Spilsbury | 4 |
| 4 | 1886–87 | Scotland (4) | England | Ireland | Wales | (England) Tinsley Lindley | 6 |
| 5 | 1887–88 | England (2) | Scotland | Wales | Ireland | (Wales) Jack Doughty | 6 |
| 6 | 1888–89 | Scotland (5) | England | Wales | Ireland | Various (Scotland) Willie Groves (England) Jack Yates (England) John Goodall | 3 |
| 7 | 1889–90 | England (3) — Scotland (6) | | Wales | Ireland | (Scotland) Willie Paul | 4 |
| 8 | 1890–91 | England (4) | Scotland | Ireland | Wales | (Ireland) Olphert Stanfield | 4 |
| 9 | 1891–92 | England (5) | Scotland | Ireland — Wales | | Various (England) Harry Daft (Scotland) John McPherson (Scotland) James Hamilton (England) John Goodall (2) | 2 |
| 10 | 1892–93 | England (6) | Scotland | Ireland | Wales | (England) Fred Spiksley | 6 |
| 11 | 1893–94 | Scotland (7) | England | Wales | Ireland | (England) John Veitch | 3 |
| 12 | 1894–95 | England (7) | Wales — Scotland | | Ireland | Various (England) Steve Bloomer (Wales) Harry Trainer (England) Frank Becton (Ireland) William Sherrard (England) John Goodall (3) | 2 |
| 13 | 1895–96 | Scotland (8) | England | Wales | Ireland | (England) Steve Bloomer (2) | 6 |
| 14 | 1896–97 | Scotland (9) | England | Ireland | Wales | (England) Steve Bloomer (3) | 4 |
| 15 | 1897–98 | England (8) | Scotland | Ireland | Wales | Various (England) Steve Bloomer (4) (Scotland) James Gillespie | 3 |
| 16 | 1898–99 | England (9) | Scotland | Ireland | Wales | (Scotland) Bob McColl | 6 |
| 17 | 1899–1900 | Scotland (10) | Wales — England | | Ireland | (Scotland) Bob McColl (2) | 6 |
| 18 | 1900–01 | England (10) | Scotland | Wales | Ireland | Various (England) Steve Bloomer (5) (Scotland) Robert Hamilton | 5 |
| 19 | 1901–02 | Scotland (11) | England | Ireland | Wales | Various (England) Andrew Gara (England) Jimmy Settle (Scotland) Robert Hamilton (2) | 3 |
| 20 | 1902–03 | England (11) — Ireland (1) — Scotland (12) | | | Wales | (England) Vivian Woodward | 4 |
| 21 | 1903–04 | England (12) | Ireland | Scotland — Wales | | Various (England) Joe Bache (England) George Davis | 2 |
| 22 | 1904–05 | England (13) | Wales | Scotland — Ireland | | (Scotland) Charles Thomson | 3 |
| 23 | 1905–06 | England (14) — Scotland (13) | | Wales | Ireland | Various (Ireland) Harold Sloan (Wales) Arthur Green | 3 |
| 24 | 1906–07 | Wales (1) | England | Scotland | Ireland | (Wales) Lot Jones | 2 |
| 25 | 1907–08 | England (15) — Scotland (14) | | Ireland | Wales | Various (Scotland) Jimmy Quinn (England) Vivian Woodward (2) | 4 |
| 26 | 1908–09 | England (16) | Wales | Scotland | Ireland | Various (Wales) William Davies (England) George Wall (Scotland) Harry Paul (England) George Hilsdon (England) Vivian Woodward (3) | 2 |
| 27 | 1909–10 | Scotland (15) | England — Ireland | | Wales | Various (Wales) Robert Evans (Wales) Grenville Morris | 2 |
| 28 | 1910–11 | England (17) | Scotland | Wales | Ireland | (Wales) Grenville Morris (2) | 3 |
| 29 | 1911–12 | England (18) — Scotland (16) | | Ireland | Wales | Various (England) Harold Fleming (England) George Holley | 3 |
| 30 | 1912–13 | England (19) | Scotland — Wales | | Ireland | (Wales) Grenville Morris (3) | 3 |
| 31 | 1913–14 | Ireland (2) | Scotland | England | Wales | (Ireland) Billy Gillespie | 3 |
| - | 1914–19 | Not held due to the First World War. | | | | | |
| 32 | 1919–20 | Wales (2) | Scotland — England | | Ireland | Various (Wales) Stan Davies (England) Bob Kelly; Tom Miller | 3 |
| 33 | 1920–21 | Scotland (17) | Wales — England | | Ireland | (Scotland) Andrew Wilson | 4 |
| 34 | 1921–22 | Scotland (18) | Wales — England | | Ireland | Various (Scotland) Andrew Wilson (2) (Ireland) Billy Gillespie (2) | 3 |
| 35 | 1922–23 | Scotland (19) | England | Ireland | Wales | (England) Harry Chambers | 3 |
| 36 | 1923–24 | Wales (3) | Scotland | Ireland | England | (Wales) Willie Davies | 2 |
| 37 | 1924–25 | Scotland (20) | England | Wales — Ireland | | (Scotland) Hughie Gallacher | 5 |
| 38 | 1925–26 | Scotland (21) | Ireland | Wales | England | (Scotland) Hughie Gallacher (2) | 3 |
| 39 | 1926–27 | Scotland (22) — England (20) | | Wales — Ireland | | (England) Dixie Dean | 4 |
| 40 | 1927–28 | Wales (4) | Ireland | Scotland | England | (Scotland) Alex Jackson | 3 |
| 41 | 1928–29 | Scotland (23) | England | Wales — Ireland | | (Scotland) Hughie Gallacher (3) | 7 |
| 42 | 1929–30 | England (21) | Scotland | Ireland | Wales | (Ireland) Joe Bambrick | 6 |
| 43 | 1930–31 | England (22) — Scotland (24) | | Wales | Ireland | (England) Jimmy Hampson | 3 |
| 44 | 1931–32 | England (23) | Scotland | Ireland | Wales | (England) Tom Waring | 3 |
| 45 | 1932–33 | Wales (5) | Scotland | England | Ireland | Various (Wales) Dai Astley (Scotland) Jimmy McGrory | 3 |
| 46 | 1933–34 | Wales (6) | England | Ireland | Scotland | Various (Wales) Dai Astley (2) (Ireland) Boy Martin | 2 |
| 47 | 1934–35 | England (24) — Scotland (25) | | Wales — Ireland | | (Scotland) Dally Duncan | 3 |
| 48 | 1935–36 | Scotland (26) | Wales — England | | Ireland | Various (Wales) Dai Astley (3) (England) Fred Tilson (Scotland) Tommy Walker (Scotland) Dally Duncan (2) | 2 |
| 49 | 1936–37 | Wales (7) | Scotland | England | Ireland | (Wales) Pat Glover | 4 |
| 50 | 1937–38 | England (25) | Scotland — Ireland | | Wales | (England) George Mills | 3 |
| 51 | 1938–39 | England (26) — Wales (8) — Scotland (27) | | | Ireland | (England) Willie Hall | 5 |
| - | 1939–45 | Not held due to the Second World War. | | | | | |
| - | 1945–46 (Note: Unofficial edition, part of the Victory Internationals.) | Scotland | Ireland — England — Wales | | | Various (England) Davy Walsh (Scotland) Billy Liddell | 2 |
| 52 | 1946–47 | England (27) | Ireland | Scotland — Wales | | (England) Wilf Mannion | 5 |
| 53 | 1947–48 | England (28) | Wales | Ireland | Scotland | Various (Ireland) Sammy Smyth (England) Stan Mortensen | 2 |
| 54 | 1948–49 | Scotland (28) | England | Wales | Ireland | (Ireland) Davy Walsh | 4 |
| 55 | 1949–50 | England (29) | Scotland | Wales — Ireland | | (England) Jack Rowley | 4 |
| 56 | 1950–51 | Scotland (29) | England | Wales | Ireland | (Scotland) Billy Steel | 4 |
| 57 | 1951–52 | Wales (9) — England (30) | | Scotland | Ireland | Various (England) Nat Lofthouse (Scotland) Bobby Johnstone (England) Stan Pearson (Wales) Ivor Allchurch | 2 |
| 58 | 1952–53 | Scotland (30) — England (31) | | Wales — Ireland | | Various (England) Nat Lofthouse (2) (Scotland) Lawrie Reilly | 3 |
| 59 | 1953–54 | England (32) | Scotland | Ireland | Wales | Various (England) Nat Lofthouse (3) (Wales) John Charles | 3 |
| 60 | 1954–55 | England (33) | Scotland | Wales | Ireland | (Wales) John Charles (2) | 5 |
| 61 | 1955–56 | England (34) — Scotland (31) — Wales (10) — Ireland (3) | | | | Various (England) Dennis Wilshaw (Scotland) Bobby Johnstone (2) | 2 |
| 62 | 1956–57 | England (35) | Scotland | Wales — Northern Ireland | | Various (England) Johnny Brooks (England) Duncan Edwards (England) Tom Finney (England) Johnny Haynes (England) Derek Kevan (England) Stanley Matthews (Northern Ireland) Jimmy McIlroy (Scotland) Willie Fernie (Scotland) Lawrie Reilly (Scotland) Tommy Ring (Scotland) Alex Scott (Wales) John Charles (Wales) Trevor Ford (Wales) Terry Medwin | 1 |
| 63 | 1957–58 | England (36) — Northern Ireland (4) | | Scotland — Wales | | Various (England) Johnny Haynes (England) Derek Kevan (Northern Ireland) Billy Simpson | 2 |
| 64 | 1958–59 | Northern Ireland (5) — England (37) | | Scotland | Wales | (England) Bobby Charlton | 3 |
| 65 | 1959–60 | Scotland (32) — England (38) — Wales (11) | | | Northern Ireland | Various (Northern Ireland) Billy Bingham (Wales) Terry Medwin (Scotland) Graham Leggat | 2 |
| 66 | 1960–61 | England (39) | Wales | Scotland | Northern Ireland | (England) Jimmy Greaves | 7 |
| 67 | 1961–62 | Scotland (33) | Wales | England | Northern Ireland | (Scotland) Alex Scott | 3 |
| 68 | 1962–63 | Scotland (34) | England | Wales | Northern Ireland | (Scotland) Denis Law | 5 |
| 69 | 1963–64 | England (40) — Scotland (35) — Northern Ireland (6) | | | Wales | (England) Jimmy Greaves (2) | 5 |
| 70 | 1964–65 | England (41) | Wales | Scotland | Northern Ireland | (England) Jimmy Greaves (3) | 4 |
| 71 | 1965–66 | England (42) | Northern Ireland | Scotland | Wales | (Northern Ireland) Willie Irvine | 3 |
| 72 | 1966–67 | Scotland (36) | England | Wales | Northern Ireland | Various (England) Jack Charlton (England) Geoff Hurst | 2 |
| 73 | 1967–68 | England (43) | Scotland | Wales — Northern Ireland | | Various (England) Bobby Charlton (2) (England) Martin Peters | 2 |
| 74 | 1968–69 | England (44) | Scotland | Northern Ireland | Wales | Various (Scotland) Colin Stein (England) Geoff Hurst (2) (England) Martin Peters (Wales) Ron Davies | 3 |
| 75 | 1969–70 | England (45) — Wales (12) — Scotland (37) | | | Northern Ireland | Various (England) Bobby Charlton (England) Geoff Hurst (England) Francis Lee (England) Martin Peters (Northern Ireland) George Best (Scotland) John O'Hare (Wales) Dick Krzywicki (Wales) Ronnie Rees | 1 |
| 76 | 1970–71 | England (46) | Northern Ireland | Wales | Scotland | (England) Martin Chivers | 2 |
| 77 | 1971–72 | Scotland (38) — England (47) | | Northern Ireland | Wales | (Scotland) Peter Lorimer | 2 |
| 78 | 1972–73 | England (48) | Northern Ireland | Scotland | Wales | (England) Martin Chivers (2) | 3 |
| 79 | 1973–74 | Scotland (39) — England (49) | | Wales — Northern Ireland | | Various (England) Stan Bowles (England) Kevin Keegan (England) Keith Weller (Northern Ireland) Tommy Cassidy (Scotland) Kenny Dalglish (Scotland) Sandy Jardine (Wales) David Smallman | 1 |
| 80 | 1974–75 | England (50) | Scotland | Northern Ireland | Wales | (England) David Johnson | 3 |
| 81 | 1975–76 | Scotland (40) | England | Wales | Northern Ireland | (England) Mick Channon | 3 |
| 82 | 1976–77 | Scotland (41) | Wales | England | Northern Ireland | (Scotland) Kenny Dalglish | 3 |
| 83 | 1977–78 | England (51) | Wales | Scotland | Northern Ireland | (Scotland) Derek Johnstone | 2 |
| 84 | 1978–79 | England (52) | Wales | Scotland | Northern Ireland | (Wales) John Toshack | 3 |
| 85 | 1979–80 | Northern Ireland (7) | England | Wales | Scotland | Various (England) Trevor Brooking (England) Steve Coppell (England) Paul Mariner (Northern Ireland) Noel Brotherston (Northern Ireland) Terry Cochrane (Northern Ireland) Billy Hamilton (Scotland) Willie Miller (Wales) Leighton James (Wales) Mickey Thomas (Wales) Ian Walsh | 1 |
| - | 1980–81 | Abandoned due to civil unrest in Northern Ireland. | | | | | |
| 86 | 1981–82 | England (53) | Scotland | Wales | Northern Ireland | Various (England) Trevor Francis (England) Glenn Hoddle (England) Kevin Keegan (England) Paul Mariner (England) Bryan Robson (England) Ray Wilkins (Northern Ireland) Sammy McIlroy (Scotland) Asa Hartford (Scotland) John Wark (Wales) Alan Curtis (Wales) Peter Nicholas (Wales) Ian Rush | 1 |
| 87 | 1982–83 | England (54) | Scotland | Northern Ireland | Wales | Various (England) Terry Butcher (England) Gordon Cowans (England) Phil Neal (England) Bryan Robson (Scotland) Alan Brazil (Scotland) Andy Gray (Wales) Gordon Davies (Wales) Ian Rush | 1 |
| 88 | 1983–84 | Northern Ireland (8) | Wales | England | Scotland | Various (England) Tony Woodcock (Wales) Mark Hughes | 2 |

== Total wins ==
| Team | Wins total | Wins outright | Shared wins |
|---|---|---|---|
| England | 54 | 34 | 20 |
| Scotland | 41 | 24 | 17 |
| Wales | 12 | 7 | 5 |
| Ireland (Note: Competed as Northern Ireland from 1956–57 to 1983–84.) | 8 | 3 | 5 |

== Medals ==
Exclude 1945–46 British Victory Home Championship and 1980–81 British Home Championship.

| Rank | Nation | Gold | Silver | Bronze | Total |
|---|---|---|---|---|---|
| 1 | England | 54 | 22 | 6 | 82 |
| 2 | Scotland | 41 | 25 | 15 | 81 |
| 3 | Wales | 12 | 15 | 33 | 60 |
| 4 | Northern Ireland | 8 | 7 | 31 | 46 |
| Totals (4 entries) | | 115 | 69 | 85 | 269 |

88 (+1 (1980–81)) editions But have many Shared Medals.

== Summary ==
Exclude 1945–46 British Victory Home Championship but Include 1980–81 British Home Championship.

| Rank | Team | Part | M | W | D | L | GF | GA | GD | Points |
|---|---|---|---|---|---|---|---|---|---|---|
| 1 | England | 89 | 266 | 161 | 56 | 49 | 661 | 282 | +379 | 378 |
| 2 | Scotland | 89 | 267 | 141 | 57 | 69 | 574 | 342 | +232 | 339 |
| 3 | Wales | 89 | 266 | 70 | 62 | 134 | 360 | 545 | -185 | 202 |
| 4 | Northern Ireland | 89 | 265 | 48 | 49 | 168 | 284 | 710 | -426 | 145 |

== Players record ==
=== All-time top goalscorers ===
| Rank | Name | Team | Goals |
|---|---|---|---|
| 1 | (England) Steve Bloomer | England | 22 |
| 2 | (Scotland) Hughie Gallacher | Scotland | 21 |
| 3 | (England) Jimmy Greaves | England | 16 |
| 4 | (Scotland) Robert Hamilton | Scotland | 15 |
| 5 | (England) Vivian Woodward | England | 14 |
| 6 | (Wales) John Charles | Wales | 13 |
| 6 | (Scotland) Andrew Wilson | Scotland | 13 |
| 8 | (England) John Goodall | England | 12 |
| 9 | (England) Martin Peters | England | 10 |
| 10 | (England) Stan Mortensen | England | 9 |
| 10 | (Wales) Billy Meredith | Wales | 9 |
| 10 | (Wales) Grenville Morris | Wales | 9 |
| 10 | (Wales) Dai Astley | Wales | 9 |
| 14 | (England) Nat Lofthouse | England | 8 |
| 14 | (England) Geoff Hurst | England | 8 |

=== Topscorer wins ===
| Rank | Name | Team | Wins |
|---|---|---|---|
| 1 | (England) Steve Bloomer | England | 5 |
| 2 | (England) Vivian Woodward | England | 3 |
| 2 | (Scotland) Hughie Gallacher | Scotland | 3 |
| 2 | (Wales) Grenville Morris | Wales | 3 |
| 2 | (Wales) Dai Astley | Wales | 3 |
| 2 | (England) Jimmy Greaves | England | 3 |
| 2 | (England) John Goodall | England | 3 |
| 2 | (England) Nat Lofthouse | England | 3 |
| 9 | (England) Geoff Hurst | England | 2 |
| 9 | (Scotland) Dally Duncan | Scotland | 2 |
| 9 | (Scotland) Bobby Johnstone | Scotland | 2 |
| 9 | (Scotland) Bob McColl | Scotland | 2 |
| 9 | (Scotland) Robert Hamilton | Scotland | 2 |
| 9 | (England) Martin Chivers | England | 2 |
| 9 | (England) Stan Mortensen | England | 2 |
| 9 | (Wales) John Charles | Wales | 2 |
| 9 | (England) Bobby Charlton | England | 2 |

== Managers record ==
=== Championship wins ===
| Rank | Manager | Wins | Editions |
|---|---|---|---|
| 1 | (England) Walter Winterbottom | 7 | 1946–47, 1947–48, 1949–50, 1952–53, 1953–54, 1956–57, 1960–61 |
| 2 | (England) Alf Ramsey | 6 | 1964–65, 1965–66, 1967–68, 1968-69, 1970–71, 1972–73 |
| 3 | (Ireland) Peter Doherty | 3 | 1955–56, 1957–58, 1958–59 |
| 3 | (England) Ron Greenwood | 3 | 1977–78, 1978–79, 1981–82 |
| 5 | (Scotland) Ian McColl | 2 | 1961–62, 1962–63 |
| 5 | (Northern Ireland) Billy Bingham | 2 | 1979–80, 1983–84 |

== See also ==
- Football in the United Kingdom (1984–present)
- Victory Shield
- Victory International
- Nations Cup
- Rous Cup
- Home Nations Futsal Championship
