= 1946–47 British Home Championship =

Tournament details
- Host country: England, Ireland, Scotland and Wales
- Dates: 28 September 1946 – 12 April 1947
- Teams: 4

Final positions
- Champions: England (28th title)
- Runners-up: Ireland

Tournament statistics
- Matches played: 6
- Goals scored: 21 (3.5 per match)
- Top scorer: (England) Wilf Mannion (5)

The 1946–47 British Home Championship was a football tournament played between the British Home Nations during the 1946–47 seasons, the first professional football seasons in Britain since the end of the Second World War. As seven seasons had passed without regular, organised, professional football, many of the players in the tournament were new to the international stage although a few old hands remained to steer the course of the competition. England were especially well endowed in this regard, with such greats as Stanley Matthews and Tommy Lawton returning to the fray.

Thanks to the efforts of these aging stars, England were able to win this first post-war competition, largely due to an opening 7–2 thrashing of Ireland. Wales were able to achieve a 3–1 victory over Scotland in their opener to move into second position. In the second round of matches, Ireland improved sufficiently to hold Scotland to a scoreless draw whilst England set up a commanding lead with a 3–0 defeat of Wales at home. In the final games, Ireland defeated Wales in a close match to take second place whilst England were held to a 1–1 draw by the Scots but nevertheless succeeded in claiming the trophy for themselves.

== Table ==
Team	Pld	W	D	L	GF	GA	GD	Pts
England (C)	3	2	1	0	11	3	+8	5
Ireland	3	1	1	1	4	8	−4	3
Wales	3	1	0	2	4	6	−2	2
Scotland	3	0	2	1	2	4	−2	2

Rules for classification: 1) points. The points system worked as follows: 2 points for a win and 1 point for a draw.
(C) Champions

== Results ==
28 September 1946

Ireland	2–7	England
Lockhart		Mannion; Finney; Lawton; Carter; Langton

Windsor Park, Belfast

19 October 1946

Wales	3–1	Scotland
Jones 52'; Ford 79'; Stephen 88' (o.g.)		Waddell 49' (pen.)

Racecourse Ground, Wrexham
Attendance: 29,568
Referee: William H. Evans (England)

13 November 1946

England	3–0	Wales
Mannion; Lawton

Maine Road, Manchester

27 November 1946

Scotland	0–0	Ireland

Hampden Park, Glasgow
Attendance: 98,776
Referee: George Reader (England)

9 March 1947

Ireland	2–1	Wales
Stevenson; Doherty		Ford

Windsor Park, Belfast

12 April 1947

England	1–1	Scotland
Carter 55'		McLaren 15'

Wembley Stadium, London
Attendance: 98,200
Referee: Charles Delasalle (France)
