= Northern Ireland national football team results (1930–1959) =

- Win Draw Loss

The Northern Ireland national football team represents Northern Ireland in international association football. From 1882 to 1921 all of Ireland was represented by a single side, the Ireland national football team, organised by the Irish Football Association (IFA).

In 1920 Ireland was partitioned into Northern Ireland and Southern Ireland. In 1922, The south of Ireland gained independence as the Irish Free State, later to become Republic of Ireland. Amid these political upheavals, a rival football association, the Football Association of Ireland (the F.A.I.), emerged in Dublin in 1921 and organised a separate league and later a national team. In 1923, during a period when the home nations had dis-affiliated from the governing body, the FAI was recognised by FIFA as the governing body of the Irish Free State on the condition that it changed its name to the Football Association of the Irish Free State. At the same time, the IFA continued to organise its national team on an all-Ireland basis, regularly calling up Free State players. During this era at least one Northerner, Harry Chatton, also played for the Irish Free State and from 1936, the FAI began to organise their own all–Ireland team. Both teams now competed as Ireland and during this era at least 39 dual internationals were selected to represent both teams. Between 1928 and 1946 the IFA were not affiliated to FIFA and the two Ireland teams co-existed, never competing in the same competition.

In April 1951, FIFA decreed that the IFA team could not select "citizens of Eire". An exception was for British Home Championship games, as a 1923 IFAB agreement at Liverpool prevented FIFA intervention in relations between the four Home Nations. However, the exception would only apply "if the F.A. of Ireland do not object", and was never availed of.

At FIFA's 1953 congress, its Rule 3 was amended so that an international team must use "that title ... recognised politically and geographically of the countries or territories". The FAI initially claimed Rule 3 gave them the right to the name Ireland (see names of the Irish state), but FIFA subsequently ruled neither team could be referred to as Ireland, decreeing that the FAI team be officially designated as the Republic of Ireland, while the IFA team was to become Northern Ireland. The IFA objected and in 1954 was permitted to continue using the name Ireland in Home Internationals, based on the 1923 agreement. This practice was discontinued in the late 1970s. (Note: The last match played as Ireland was 1978 versus Scotland, however, apart from this match, all British Championship matches had been played as "Northern Ireland" since the 1973–74 tournament. In the 1972–73 tournament, the first two matches were played as "Ireland" and the third as "Northern Ireland". In the 1971–72 tournament, the first was played as "Ireland" and the second and third as "Northern Ireland". 1970–71 was the last tournament in which all matches were played under the name "Ireland".)

This is a list of the Ireland national football team results from 1930 to 1959.

== 1930s ==
=== 1930 ===
1 February 1930 1929–30 British Home Championship	Ireland	7–0	Wales	Belfast, Northern Ireland
Match 133	Bambrick 12', 43', 51', 59', 64', 88'; McCluggage 90'	Report		Stadium: Celtic Park; Attendance: 25,000; Referee: Thomas Crewe (England)

22 February 1930 1929–30 British Home Championship	Scotland	3–1	Ireland	Glasgow, Scotland
Match 134	Gallacher 31', 61'; Stevenson 72'	Report	McCaw 39'	Stadium: Celtic Park; Attendance: 31,808; Referee: Arthur Joseph (England)

20 October 1930 1930–31 British Home Championship	England	5–1	Ireland	Sheffield, England
Match 135	Burgess 15', 35'; Hampson 25'; Crooks 30'; Houghton 40'	Report	Dunne 80'	Stadium: Bramall Lane; Attendance: 25,000; Referee: John Thomson (Scotland)

=== 1931 ===
21 February 1931 1930–31 British Home Championship	Ireland	0–0	Scotland	Belfast, Northern Ireland
Match 136		Report		Stadium: Windsor Park; Attendance: 20,000; Referee: Herbert Edward Hull (England)

22 April 1931 1930–31 British Home Championship	Wales	3–2	Ireland	Wrexham, Wales
Match 137	Phillips 3'; Griffiths 40'; Warren 69'	Report	Dunne 52'; Rowley 72'	Stadium: Racecourse Ground; Attendance: 11,000; Referee: William Percy Harper (England)

19 September 1931 1931–32 British Home Championship	Scotland	3–1	Ireland	Glasgow, Scotland
Match 138	Stevenson 5'; McGrory 34'; McPhail 75'	Report	Dunne 21'	Stadium: Ibrox Park; Attendance: 45,000; Referee: Isaac Caswell (England)

17 October 1931 1931–32 British Home Championship	Ireland	2–6	England	Belfast, Northern Ireland
Match 139	Dunne 40'; Kelly 89'	Report	Smith 10'; Waring 12', 50'; Hine 30'; Houghton 60', 85'	Stadium: Windsor Park; Attendance: 40,000; Referee: Hugh Watson (Scotland)

5 December 1931 1931–32 British Home Championship	Ireland	4–0	Wales	Belfast, Northern Ireland
Match 140	Millar 32'; Kelly 71', 77'; Bambrick 81'	Report		Stadium: Windsor Park; Attendance: 11,000; Referee: Peter Snape (England)

=== 1932 ===
17 September 1932 1932–33 British Home Championship	Ireland	0–4	Scotland	Belfast, Northern Ireland
Match 141		Report	King 3'; McPhail 27', 68'; McGrory 76'	Stadium: Windsor Park; Attendance: 40,000; Referee: William Percy Harper (England)

17 October 1932 1932–33 British Home Championship	England	1–0	Ireland	Blackpool, England
Match 142	Barclay 31'	Report		Stadium: Bloomfield Road; Attendance: 25,000; Referee: Hugh Watson (Scotland)

7 December 1932 1932–33 British Home Championship	Wales	4–1	Ireland	Wrexham, Wales
Match 143	Astley 47', 78'; Robbins 48', 87'	Report	English 27'	Stadium: Racecourse Ground; Attendance: 8,500; Referee: George Hewitt (England)

=== 1933 ===
16 September 1933 1933–34 British Home Championship	Scotland	1–2	Ireland	Glasgow, Scotland
Match 144	McPhail 84'	Report	Martin 8', 13'	Stadium: Celtic Park; Attendance: 27,135; Referee: Edward Wood (England)

14 October 1933 1933–34 British Home Championship	Ireland	0–3	England	Belfast, Northern Ireland
Match 145		Report	Brook 30'; Grosvenor 51'; Bowers 60'	Stadium: Windsor Park; Attendance: 35,000; Referee: Hugh Watson (Scotland)

4 November 1933 1933–34 British Home Championship	Ireland	1–1	Wales	Belfast, Northern Ireland
Match 146	Jones 59'	Report	Glover 4'	Stadium: Windsor Park; Attendance: 20,000; Referee: Mungo Charles Hutton (Scotland)

=== 1934 ===
20 October 1934 1934–35 British Home Championship	Ireland	2–1	Scotland	Belfast, Northern Ireland
Match 147	Martin 80'; Coulter 90'	Report	Gallacher 40'	Stadium: Windsor Park; Attendance: 39,572; Referee: Henry Norman Mee (England)

=== 1935 ===
6 February 1935 1934–35 British Home Championship	England	2–1	Ireland	Liverpool, England
Match 148	Bastin 21', 71'	Report	Stevenson 47'	Stadium: Goodison Park; Attendance: 32,000; Referee: William E. Webb (Scotland)

27 March 1935 1934–35 British Home Championship	Wales	3–1	Ireland	Wrexham, Wales
Match 149	Jones 7'; Phillips 23' (pen.); Hopkins 85'	Report	Bambrick 22'	Stadium: Racecourse Ground; Attendance: 17,000; Referee: Peco Bauwens (Germany)

19 October 1935 1935–36 British Home Championship	Ireland	1–3	England	Belfast, Northern Ireland
Match 150	Brown 18'	Report	Tilson 65', 68'; Brook 85'	Stadium: Windsor Park; Attendance: 35,000; Referee: William E. Webb (Scotland)

13 November 1935 1935–36 British Home Championship	Scotland	2–1	Ireland	Edinburgh, Scotland
Match 151	Walker 60'; Duncan 89'	Report	Kelly 49'	Stadium: Tynecastle Park; Attendance: 29,800; Referee: Harry Nattrass (England)

=== 1936 ===
11 March 1936 1935–36 British Home Championship	Ireland	3–2	Wales	Belfast, Northern Ireland
Match 152	Gibb 34'; Stevenson 61'; Kernaghan 80'	Report	Astley 30'; Phillips 43'	Stadium: Celtic Park; Attendance: 20,000; Referee: Henry Nattrass (England)

31 October 1936 1936–37 British Home Championship	Ireland	1–3	Scotland	Belfast, Northern Ireland
Match 153	Kernaghan 26'	Report	Napier 28'; Munro 46'; McCulloch 62'	Stadium: Windsor Park; Attendance: 45,000; Referee: Thomas J. Thompson (England)

18 November 1936 1936–37 British Home Championship	England	3–1	Ireland	Stoke, England
Match 154	Carter 30'; Bastin 71'; Worrall 80'	Report	Davis 43'	Stadium: Victoria Ground; Attendance: 47,886; Referee: William E. Webb (Scotland)

=== 1937 ===
17 March 1937 1936–37 British Home Championship	Wales	4–1	Ireland	Wrexham, Wales
Match 155	Jones 25'; Glover 33', 51'; Warren 65'	Report	Stevenson 62'	Stadium: Racecourse Ground; Attendance: 19,000; Referee: Arthur James Jewell (England)

23 October 1937 1937–38 British Home Championship	Ireland	1–5	England	Belfast, Northern Ireland
Match 156	Stevenson 89'	Report	Mills 10', 20', 55'; Hall 58'; Brook 75'	Stadium: Windsor Park; Attendance: 36,000; Referee: William E. Webb (Scotland)

10 November 1937 1937–38 British Home Championship	Scotland	1–1	Ireland	Aberdeen, Scotland
Match 157	Smith 48'	Report	Doherty 15'	Stadium: Pittodrie Stadium; Attendance: 21,878; Referee: Arthur James Jewell (England)

=== 1938 ===
16 March 1938 1937–38 British Home Championship	Ireland	1–0	Wales	Belfast, Northern Ireland
Match 158	Bambrick 78'	Report		Stadium: Windsor Park; Attendance: 14,000; Referee: Herbert Reginald A. Mortimer (England)

8 October 1938 1938–39 British Home Championship	Ireland	0–2	Scotland	Belfast, Northern Ireland
Match 159		Report	Delaney 34'; Walker 49'	Stadium: Windsor Park; Attendance: 40,000; Referee: Herbert Reginald A. Mortimer (England)

16 November 1938 1938–39 British Home Championship	England	7–0	Ireland	Manchester, England
Match 160		Report	Lawton 6'; Hall 35', 37', 38', 55', 65'; Matthews 75'	Stadium: Old Trafford; Attendance: 40,386; Referee: Peter Craigmyle (Scotland)

=== 1939 ===
15 March 1939 1938–39 British Home Championship	Wales	3–1	Ireland	Wrexham, Wales
Match 161	Cumner 7'; Glover 20'; Boulter 62'	Report	Milligan 15'	Stadium: Racecourse Ground; Attendance: 22,997; Referee: Dr. Arthur Willoughby Barton (England)

== 1940s ==
=== 1946 ===
28 September 1946 1946–47 British Home Championship	Ireland	2–7	England	Belfast, Northern Ireland
Match 162	Lockhart 70', 88'	Report	Carter 1'; Mannion 7', 28', 61'; Finney 60'; Lawton 80'; Langton 83'	Stadium: Windsor Park; Attendance: 57,011; Referee: William E. Webb (Scotland)

27 November 1946 1946–47 British Home Championship	Scotland	0–0	Ireland	Glasgow, Scotland
Match 163		Report		Stadium: Hampden Park; Attendance: 97,326; Referee: George Reader (England)

=== 1947 ===
9 March 1947 1946–47 British Home Championship	Ireland	2–1	Wales	Belfast, Northern Ireland
Match 164	Stevenson 36'; Doherty 77' (pen.)	Report	Ford 27' (pen.)	Stadium: Windsor Park; Attendance: 43,000; Referee: George Reader (England)

4 October 1947 1947–48 British Home Championship	Ireland	2–0	Scotland	Belfast, Northern Ireland
Match 165	Smyth 35', 52'	Report		Stadium: Windsor Park; Attendance: 52,000; Referee: Thomas Smith (England)

5 November 1947 1947–48 British Home Championship	England	2–2	Ireland	Liverpool, England
Match 166	Mannion 84'; Lawton 87'	Report	Walsh 54'; Doherty 90'	Stadium: Goodison Park; Attendance: 67,980; Referee: Peter Fitzpatrick (Scotland)

=== 1948 ===
10 March 1948 1947–48 British Home Championship	Wales	2–0	Ireland	Wrexham, Wales
Match 167	Lowrie 41'; Edwards 53'	Report		Stadium: Racecourse Ground; Attendance: 32,310; Referee: Thomas Smith (England)

9 October 1948 1948–49 British Home Championship	Ireland	2–6	England	Belfast, Northern Ireland
Match 168	Walsh 49', 89'	Report	Matthews 27'; Milburn 55'; Mortensen 62', 66', 74'; Pearson 88'	Stadium: Windsor Park; Attendance: 53,629; Referee: William E. Webb (Scotland)

17 November 1948 1948–49 British Home Championship	Scotland	3–2	Ireland	Glasgow, Scotland
Match 169	Houliston 29', 89'; Mason 73'	Report	Walsh 1', 5'	Stadium: Hampden Park; Attendance: 91,547; Referee: William H. Evans (England)

=== 1949 ===
9 March 1949 1948–49 British Home Championship	Ireland	0–2	Wales	Belfast, Northern Ireland
Match 170		Report	Edwards 25'; Ford 83'	Stadium: Windsor Park; Attendance: 22,880; Referee: Reg Leafe (England)

1 October 1949 1949–50 British Home Championship; 1950 FIFA World Cup Qualifying Group 1	Ireland	2–8	Scotland	Belfast, Northern Ireland
Match 171	Smyth 50', 60'	Report	Morris 2', 70', 88'; Waddell 5', 31' (pen.); Steel 23'; Reilly 24'; Mason 80'	Stadium: Windsor Park; Attendance: 50,000; Referee: Herbert Reginald A. Mortimer (England)

16 November 1949 1949–50 British Home Championship; 1950 FIFA World Cup Qualifying Group 1	England	9–2	Ireland	Manchester, England
Match 172	Rowley 5', 46', 57', 59'; Froggatt 25'; Pearson 31', 68'; Mortensen 35', 50'	Report	Smyth 56'; Brennan 75'	Stadium: Maine Road; Attendance: 69,472; Referee: Sandy Griffiths (Wales)

== 1950s ==
=== 1950 ===
8 March 1950 1949–50 British Home Championship; 1950 FIFA World Cup Qualifying Group 1	Wales	0–0	Ireland (Note: This was the last time an "all-Ireland" team represented the IFA.)	Wrexham, Wales
Match 173		Report		Stadium: Racecourse Ground; Attendance: 30,000; Referee: Reginald James Leafe (England)

7 October 1950 1950–51 British Home Championship	Ireland	1–4	England	Belfast, Northern Ireland
Match 174	McMorran 70'	Report	Baily 43', 86'; Lee 64'; Wright 85'	Stadium: Windsor Park; Attendance: 46,000; Referee: George Mitchell (Scotland)

1 November 1950 1950–51 British Home Championship	Scotland	6–1	Ireland	Glasgow, Scotland
Match 175	McPhail 8', 13'; Steel 53', 57', 66', 79'	Report	McGarry 43'	Stadium: Hampden Park; Attendance: 82,050; Referee: Benjamin Mervyn Griffiths (Wales)

=== 1951 ===
7 March 1951 1950–51 British Home Championship	Ireland	1–2	Wales	Belfast, Northern Ireland
Match 176	Simpson 52'	Report	Clarke 8', 86'	Stadium: Windsor Park; Attendance: 12,000; Referee: Clifford Fletcher (England)

12 May 1951 International Friendly	Ireland	2–2	France	Belfast, Northern Ireland
Match 177	Ferris 9' (pen.); Simpson 62'	Report	Baratte 16'; Bonifaci 28'	Stadium: Windsor Park; Attendance: 24,000; Referee: Arthur Ellis (England)

6 October 1951 1951–52 British Home Championship	Ireland	0–3	Scotland	Belfast, Northern Ireland
Match 178		Report	Orr 33'; Johnstone 44', 63'	Stadium: Windsor Park; Attendance: 56,946; Referee: W.H.E. Evans (England)

14 November 1951 1951–52 British Home Championship	England	2–0	Ireland	Birmingham, England
Match 179	Lofthouse 40', 83'	Report		Stadium: Villa Park; Attendance: 57,889; Referee: Sandy Griffiths (Wales)

=== 1952 ===
19 March 1952 1951–52 British Home Championship	Wales	3–0	Ireland	Swansea, Wales
Match 180	Barnes 55' (pen.); Allchurch 87'; Clarke 90'	Report		Stadium: Vetch Field; Attendance: 30,000; Referee: Arthur Edward Ellis (England)

4 October 1952 1952–53 British Home Championship	Ireland	2–2	England	Belfast, Northern Ireland
Match 181	Tully 16', 46'	Report	Lofthouse 2'; Elliott 87'	Stadium: Windsor Park; Attendance: 59,000; Referee: Douglas Gerrard (Scotland)

3 November 1952 1952–53 British Home Championship	Scotland	1–1	Ireland	Glasgow, Scotland
Match 182	Reilly 89'	Report	D'Arcy 82'	Stadium: Hampden Park; Attendance: 65,229; Referee: Robert E. Smith (Wales)

11 November 1952 International Friendly	France	3–1	Northern Ireland (Note: This was the first time a team billed as "Northern Ireland" played an international match.)	Colombes, France
Match 183	Ujlaki 30'; Kopa 36', 89'	Report	Tully 42'	Stadium: Stade Olympique Yves-du-Manoir; Attendance: 52,399; Referee: Klaas Schipper (Netherlands)

=== 1953 ===
15 April 1953 1952–53 British Home Championship	Ireland	2–3	Wales	Belfast, Northern Ireland
Match 184	McMorran 19', 86'	Report	Charles 29', 33'; Ford 42'	Stadium: Windsor Park; Attendance: 33,000; Referee: Archer Leuty (England)

3 October 1953 1953–54 British Home Championship; 1954 FIFA World Cup Qualifying Group 3	Ireland	1–3	Scotland	Belfast, Northern Ireland
Match 185	Lockhart 72' (pen.)	Report	Fleming 47', 69'; Henderson 89'	Stadium: Windsor Park; Attendance: 58,248; Referee: Arthur Edward Ellis (England)

11 November 1953 1953–54 British Home Championship; 1954 FIFA World Cup Qualifying Group 3	England	3–1	Ireland	Liverpool, England
Match 186	Hassall 1', 60'; Lofthouse 74'	Report	McMorran 52'	Stadium: Goodison Park; Attendance: 70,700; Referee: Robert E. Smith (Wales)

=== 1954 ===
31 March 1954 1953–54 British Home Championship; 1954 FIFA World Cup Qualifying Group 3	Wales	1–2	Ireland	Wrexham, Wales
Match 187	Charles 80'	Report	McParland 1', 52'	Stadium: Racecourse Ground; Attendance: 32,817; Referee: Charles Edward Faultless (Scotland)

2 October 1954 1954–55 British Home Championship	Ireland	0–2	England	Belfast, Northern Ireland
Match 188		Report	Haynes 75'; Revie 78'	Stadium: Windsor Park; Attendance: 59,000; Referee: Charles Edward Faultless (Scotland)

3 November 1954 1954–55 British Home Championship	Scotland	2–2	Ireland	Glasgow, Scotland
Match 189	Davidson 22'; Johnstone 74'	Report	Bingham 24'; McAdams 43'	Stadium: Hampden Park; Attendance: 46,229; Referee: Alf Bond (England)

=== 1955 ===
20 April 1955 1954–55 British Home Championship	Ireland	2–3	Wales	Belfast, Northern Ireland
Match 190	Crossan 24'; Walker 29'	Report	Charles 11', 18', 49'	Stadium: Windsor Park; Attendance: 28,000; Referee: Hugh Phillips (Scotland)

8 October 1955 1955–56 British Home Championship	Ireland	2–1	Scotland	Belfast, Northern Ireland
Match 191	Blanchflower 7'; Bingham 16'	Report	Reilly 62'	Stadium: Windsor Park; Attendance: 58,000; Referee: John H. Kelly (England)

2 November 1955 1955–56 British Home Championship	England	3–0	Ireland	London, England
Match 192	Wilshaw 51', 53'; Finney 88'	Report		Stadium: Wembley Stadium; Attendance: 58,000; Referee: Sandy Griffiths (Wales)

=== 1956 ===
11 April 1956 1955–56 British Home Championship	Wales	1–1	Ireland	Cardiff, Wales
Match 193	Clarke 10'	Report	Jones 46'	Stadium: Ninian Park; Attendance: 37,510; Referee: Bobby Davidson (Scotland)

6 October 1956 1956–57 British Home Championship	Ireland	1–1	England	Belfast, Northern Ireland
Match 194	McIlroy 10'	Report	Matthews 2'	Stadium: Windsor Park; Attendance: 58,420; Referee: Hugh Phillips (Scotland)

7 November 1956 1956–57 British Home Championship	Scotland	1–0	Ireland	Glasgow, Scotland
Match 195	Scott 25'	Report		Stadium: Hampden Park; Attendance: 62,328; Referee: Reginald James Leafe (England)

=== 1957 ===
16 January 1957 1958 FIFA World Cup Group 8 Qualifier	Portugal	1–1	Northern Ireland	Lisbon, Portugal
Match 196	Vasques 24'	Report	Bingham 6'	Stadium: Estádio José Alvalade; Attendance: 22,659; Referee: Marcel Lequesne (France)

10 April 1957 1956–57 British Home Championship	Ireland	0–0	Wales	Belfast, Northern Ireland
Match 197		Report		Stadium: Windsor Park; Attendance: 30,000; Referee: Douglas Gerrard (Scotland)

25 April 1957 1958 FIFA World Cup Group 8 Qualifier	Italy	1–0	Northern Ireland	Rome, Italy
Match 198	Cervato 3'	Report		Stadium: Stadio Olimpico; Attendance: 70,000; Referee: Maurice Guigue (France)

1 May 1957 1958 FIFA World Cup Group 8 Qualifier	Northern Ireland	3–0	Portugal	Belfast, Northern Ireland
Match 199	Casey 22'; Simpson 60'; McIlroy 70' (pen.)	Report		Stadium: Windsor Park; Attendance: 35,000; Referee: Hugh Phillips (Scotland)

5 October 1957 1957–58 British Home Championship	Ireland	1–1	Scotland	Belfast, Northern Ireland
Match 200	Bingham 47'	Report	Leggat 59'	Stadium: Windsor Park; Attendance: 58,000; Referee: Leo Callaghan (Wales)

6 November 1957 1957–58 British Home Championship	England	2–3	Ireland	London, England
Match 201	A'Court 58'; Edwards 80'	Report	McIlroy 32' (pen.); McCrory 67'; Simpson 72'	Stadium: Wembley Stadium; Attendance: 42,000; Referee: Sandy Griffiths (Wales)

4 December 1957 International Friendly	Northern Ireland	2–2	Italy	Belfast, Northern Ireland
Match 202	Cush 27', 60'	Report	Ghiggia 24'; Montuori 50'	Stadium: Windsor Park; Attendance: 53,000; Referee: Thomas Mitchell (Northern Ireland)

=== 1958 ===
15 January 1958 1958 FIFA World Cup Group 8 Qualifier	Northern Ireland	2–1	Italy	Belfast, Northern Ireland
Match 203	McIlroy 13'; Cush 28'	Report	Da Costa 56'	Stadium: Windsor Park; Attendance: 43,000; Referee: István Zsolt (Hungary)

16 April 1958 1957–58 British Home Championship	Wales	1–1	Ireland	Cardiff, Wales
Match 204	Hewitt 85'	Report	Simpson 64'	Stadium: Ninian Park; Attendance: 25,667; Referee: Hugh Phillips (Scotland)

8 June 1958 1958 FIFA World Cup Group 1	Northern Ireland	1–0	Czechoslovakia	Halmstad, Sweden
19:00 (CET); Match 205	Cush 20'	Report		Stadium: Örjans Vall; Attendance: 10,647; Referee: Fritz Seipelt (Austria)

11 June 1958 1958 FIFA World Cup Group 1	Argentina	3–1	Northern Ireland	Halmstad, Sweden
19:00 (CET); Match 206	Corbatta 37' (pen.); Menéndez 56'; Avio 60'	Report	McParland 4'	Stadium: Örjans Vall; Attendance: 14,174; Referee: Sten Ahlner (Sweden)

15 June 1958 1958 FIFA World Cup Group 1	West Germany	2–2	Northern Ireland	Malmö, Sweden
19:00 (CET); Match 207	Rahn 20'; Seeler 78'	Report	McParland 18', 60'	Stadium: Malmö Stadion; Attendance: 21,990; Referee: Joaquim Campos (Portugal)

17 June 1958 1958 FIFA World Cup Group 1 Playoff	Northern Ireland	2–1 (a.e.t.)	Czechoslovakia	Malmö, Sweden
19:00 (CET); Match 208	McParland 44', 97'	Report	Zikán 18'	Stadium: Malmö Stadion; Attendance: 6,196; Referee: Maurice Guigue (France)

19 June 1958 1958 FIFA World Cup Quarter-final	France	4–0	Northern Ireland	Norrköping, Sweden
19:00 (CET); Match 209	Wisnieski 44'; Fontaine 55', 63'; Piantoni 68'	Report		Stadium: Idrottsparken; Attendance: 11,800; Referee: Juan Gardeazábal Garay (Spain)

4 October 1958 1958–59 British Home Championship	Ireland	3–3	England	Belfast, Northern Ireland
Match 210	Cush 30'; Peacock 57'; Casey 70'	Report	Charlton 31', 77'; Finney 61'	Stadium: Windsor Park; Attendance: 58,000; Referee: Bobby Davidson (Scotland)

15 October 1958 International Friendly	Spain	6–2	Northern Ireland	Madrid, Spain
Match 211	Tejada 3', 47', 78', 87'; Kubala 11'; Suárez 58'	Report	Cush 50'; McIlroy 77'	Stadium: Santiago Bernabéu Stadium; Attendance: 120,000; Referee: Joaquim Campos (Portugal)

5 November 1958 1958–59 British Home Championship	Scotland	2–2	Ireland	Glasgow, Scotland
Match 212	Herd 53'; Collins 57'	Report	Caldow 74' (o.g.); McIlroy 83'	Stadium: Hampden Park; Attendance: 72,713; Referee: John Harold Clough (England)

=== 1959 ===
22 April 1959 1958–59 British Home Championship	Ireland	4–1	Wales	Belfast, Northern Ireland
Match 213	McParland 8', 78'; Peacock 13'; McIlroy 32'	Report	Tapscott 88'	Stadium: Windsor Park; Attendance: 45,000; Referee: Tiny Wharton (Scotland)

3 October 1959 1959–60 British Home Championship	Ireland	0–4	Scotland	Belfast, Northern Ireland
Match 214		Report	Leggat 25'; Hewie 34' (pen.); White 41'; Mulhall 54'	Stadium: Windsor Park; Attendance: 56,000; Referee: Reginald James Leafe (England)

18 November 1959 1959–60 British Home Championship	England	2–1	Ireland	London, England
Match 215	Baker 16'; Parry 89'	Report	Bingham 87'	Stadium: Wembley Stadium; Attendance: 60,000; Referee: Leo Callaghan (Wales)
