= England national football team results (1930–1959) =

- Win Draw Loss Void

This is a list of the England national football team results from 1930 to 1959.

== 1930s ==
=== 1930 ===
5 April Home Championship	England	5 – 2	Scotland	London, England
	Watson 11', 28'; Rimmer 30', 55'; Jack 33'	Report	Fleming 49', 62'	Stadium: Wembley Stadium; Attendance: 87,375; Referee: William McLean (Northern Ireland)

10 May International Friendly	Germany	3 – 3	England	Berlin, Germany
	Hofmann 10', 50', 60'	Report	Bradford 8', 25'; Jack 78'	Stadium: Deutsches Stadion; Attendance: 50,000; Referee: Johannes Mutters (Netherlands)

14 May International Friendly	Austria	0 – 0	England	Vienna, Austria
		Report		Stadium: Hohe Warte Stadium; Attendance: 61,000; Referee: Johannes Mutters (Netherlands)

20 October Home Championship	England	5 – 1	Ireland	Sheffield, England
	Burgess 15', 35'; Hampson 25'; Crooks 30'; Houghton 40'	Report	Dunne 80'	Stadium: Bramall Lane; Attendance: 25,000; Referee: John Thomson (Scotland)

22 November Home Championship	Wales	0 – 4	England	Wrexham, Wales
		Report	Hampson 12', 70'; Hodgson 35'; Bradford 80'	Stadium: Racecourse Ground; Attendance: 14,000; Referee: Hugh Watson (Scotland)

=== 1931 ===
28 March Home Championship	Scotland	2 – 0	England	Glasgow, Scotland
	McPhail 61'; McGrory 64'	Report		Stadium: Hampden Park; Attendance: 129,810; Referee: Alfred Atwood (Wales)

14 May International Friendly	France	5 – 2	England	Paris, France
	Laurent 15'; Mercier 18', 76'; Langiller 29'; Delfour 57'	Report	Crooks 10'; Waring 71'	Stadium: Colombes; Attendance: 35,000; Referee: John Langenus (Belgium)

16 May International Friendly	Belgium	1 – 4	England	Brussels, Belgium
	Capelle 15'	Report	Houghton 44' (pen.); Burgess 65', 76'; Roberts 80'	Stadium: Oscar Bossaert Stadium; Attendance: 30,000; Referee: Peco Bauwens (Germany)

17 October Home Championship	Ireland	2 – 6	England	Belfast, Northern Ireland
	Dunne 43'; Kelly 89'	Report	Smith 10'; Waring 11', 50'; Hine 30'; Houghton 60', 85'	Stadium: Windsor Park; Attendance: 40,000; Referee: Hugh Watson (Scotland)

18 November Home Championship	England	3 – 1	Wales	Liverpool, England
	Smith 25'; Crooks 50'; Hine 65'	Report	Robbins	Stadium: Anfield; Attendance: 15,000; Referee: William Bunnell (England)

9 December International Friendly	England	7 – 1	Spain	London, England
	Smith 3', 40'; Johnson 10', 76'; Crooks 50', 85'; Dean 68'	Report	87' Gorostiza	Stadium: Highbury; Attendance: 55,000; Referee: Peco Bauwens (Germany)

=== 1932 ===
9 April Home Championship	England	3 – 0	Scotland	London, England
	Waring 36'; Barclay 80'; Crooks 88'	Report		Stadium: Wembley Stadium; Attendance: 92,180; Referee: Samuel Thompson (Ireland)

17 October Home Championship	England	1 – 0	Ireland	Blackpool, England
	Barclay 30'	Report		Stadium: Bloomfield Road; Attendance: 25,000; Referee: Hugh Watson (Scotland)

16 November Home Championship	Wales	0 – 0	England	Wrexham, Wales
		Report		Stadium: Racecourse Ground; Attendance: 25,167; Referee: Samuel Thompson (Ireland)

7 December International Friendly	England	4 – 3	Austria	London, England
	Crooks 5'; Hampson 27', 82'; Houghton 77'	Report	Zischek 58', 87'; Sindelar 80'	Stadium: Stamford Bridge; Attendance: 40,000; Referee: John Langenus (Belgium)

=== 1933 ===
1 April Home Championship	Scotland	2 – 1	England	Glasgow, Scotland
	McGrory 5', 81'	Report	Hunt 30'	Stadium: Hampden Park; Attendance: 136,259; Referee: Samuel Thompson (Ireland)

13 May International Friendly	Italy	1 – 1	England	Rome, Italy
	Ferrari 4'	Report	Bastin 24'	Stadium: Stadio Nazionale PNF; Attendance: 50,000; Referee: Peco Bauwens (Germany)

29 May International Friendly	Switzerland	0 – 4	England	Bern, Switzerland
		Report	Bastin 15', 75'; Richardson 71', 77'	Stadium: Stadion Neufeld; Attendance: 26,000; Referee: Peco Bauwens (Germany)

14 October Home Championship	Ireland	0 – 3	England	Belfast, Northern Ireland
		Report	Brook 30'; Grosvenor 51'; Bowers 60'	Stadium: Windsor Park; Attendance: 35,000; Referee: Hugh Watson (Scotland)

15 November Home Championship	England	1 – 2	Wales	Newcastle upon Tyne, England
	Brook	Report	Mills; Astley	Stadium: St James' Park; Attendance: 15,000; Referee: Samuel Thompson (Ireland)

6 December International Friendly	England	4 – 1	France	London, England
	Camsell 12', 42'; Brook 20'; Grosvenor 55'	Report	Veinante 78'	Stadium: White Hart Lane; Attendance: 17,097; Referee: John Langenus (Belgium)

=== 1934 ===
14 April Home Championship	England	3 – 0	Scotland	London, England
	Bastin 43'; Brook 70'; Bowers 85'	Report		Stadium: Wembley Stadium; Attendance: 92,363; Referee: Samuel Thompson (Ireland)

10 May International Friendly	Hungary	2 – 1	England	Budapest, Hungary
	Avar 56'; Sárosi 65'	Report	Tilson 84'	Stadium: Népstadion; Attendance: 40,000; Referee: Rinaldo Barlassina (Italy)

16 May International Friendly	Czechoslovakia	2 – 1	England	Prague, Czechoslovakia
	Nejedlý 40'; Puč 51'	Report	Tilson 20'	Stadium: Letná Stadium; Attendance: 35,000; Referee: John Langenus (Belgium)

29 September Home Championship	Wales	0 – 4	England	Cardiff, Wales
		Report	Tilson; Brook; Matthews	Stadium: Ninian Park; Attendance: 51,000; Referee: Samuel Thompson (Ireland)

14 November International Friendly	England	3 – 2	Italy	London, England
	Brook 3', 10'; Drake 12'	Report	Meazza 58', 62'	Stadium: Highbury; Attendance: 56,044; Referee: Otto Olsson (Sweden)

=== 1935 ===
6 February Home Championship	England	2 – 1	Ireland	Liverpool, England
	Bastin 18', 70'	Report	Stevenson 50'	Stadium: Goodison Park; Attendance: 35,000; Referee: Willie Webb (Scotland)

6 April Home Championship	Scotland	2 – 0	England	Glasgow, Scotland
	Duncan 43', 49'	Report		Stadium: Hampden Park; Attendance: 129,693; Referee: Samuel Thompson (Ireland)

18 May International Friendly	Netherlands	0 – 1	England	Amsterdam, Netherlands
		Report	Worrall 46'	Stadium: Olympic Stadium; Attendance: 33,000; Referee: Peco Bauwens (Germany)

19 October Home Championship	Ireland	1 – 3	England	Belfast, Northern Ireland
	Brown	Report	Tilson; Brook	Stadium: Windsor Park; Attendance: 35,000; Referee: Willie Webb (Scotland)

4 December International Friendly	England	3 – 0	Germany	London, England
	Camsell 35', 50'; Bastin 68'	Report		Stadium: White Hart Lane; Attendance: 54,164; Referee: Otto Olsson (Sweden)

=== 1936 ===
5 February Home Championship	England	1 – 2	Wales	Wolverhampton, England
	Bowden 40'	Report	Astley 47'; B. Jones 65'	Stadium: Molineux; Attendance: 27,519; Referee: Willie Webb (Scotland)

4 April Home Championship	England	1 – 1	Scotland	London, England
	Camsell 30'	Report	Walker 80' (pen.)	Stadium: Wembley Stadium; Attendance: 93,267; Referee: William Hamilton (Ireland)

6 May International Friendly	Austria	2 – 1	England	Vienna, Austria
	Viertl 11'; Geiter 18'	Report	Camsell 54'	Stadium: Praterstadion; Attendance: 60,000; Referee: John Langenus (Belgium)

9 May International Friendly	Belgium	3 – 2	England	Brussels, Belgium
	Isemborghs; Fievez	Report	Camsell; Hobbis	Stadium: Jubilee Stadium; Attendance: 40,000; Referee: Johannes van Moorsel (Netherlands)

17 October Home Championship	Wales	2 – 1	England	Cardiff, Wales
	Morris 64'; Glover 66'	Report	Bastin 44'	Stadium: Ninian Park; Attendance: 44,729; Referee: William McLean (Ireland)

18 November Home Championship	England	3 – 1	Ireland	Stoke-on-Trent, England
	Carter; Bastin; Worrall	Report	Davis	Stadium: Victoria Ground; Attendance: 25,000; Referee: Willie Webb (Scotland)

2 December International Friendly	England	6 – 2	Hungary	London, England
	Brook 25'; Drake 32', 43', 80'; Britton 52'; Carter 87'	Report	Cseh 26'; Vincze 48'	Stadium: Highbury; Attendance: 36,000; Referee: Lucien Leclerq (France)

=== 1937 ===
17 April Home Championship	Scotland	3 – 1	England	Glasgow, Scotland
	O'Donnell 47'; McPhail 80', 88'	Report	Steele 40'	Stadium: Hampden Park; Attendance: 149,407; Referee: William McLean (Ireland)

14 May International Friendly	Norway	0 – 6	England	Oslo, Norway
		Report	Kirchen 18'; Holmsen 38' (o.g.); Galley 40'; Steele 43', 61'; Goulden 85'	Stadium: Ullevall Stadium; Attendance: 20,000; Referee: Einer Ulrich (Denmark)

17 May International Friendly	Sweden	0 – 4	England	Stockholm, Sweden
		Report	Steele 7', 13', 33'; Johnson 35'	Stadium: Råsunda Stadium; Attendance: 34,119; Referee: John Langenus (Belgium)

20 May International Friendly	Finland	0 – 8	England	Helsinki, Finland
		Report	Kirchen 6'; Payne 27', 56'; Steele 36', 52'; Johnson 44'; Willingham 75'; Robinson 87'	Stadium: Töölön Pallokenttä; Attendance: 9,533; Referee: Rudolf Eklöw (Sweden)

23 October Home Championship	Ireland	1 – 5	England	Belfast, Northern Ireland
	Stevenson	Report	Mills; Hall; Brook	Stadium: Windsor Park; Attendance: 36,000; Referee: Willie Webb (Scotland)

17 November Home Championship	England	2 – 1	Wales	Middlesbrough, England
	Matthews 28'; Hall 57'	Report	Perry 16'	Stadium: Ayresome Park; Attendance: 30,608; Referee: Willie Webb (Scotland)

1 December International Friendly	England	5 – 4	Czechoslovakia	London, England
	Crayston 10'; Morton 19'; Matthews 28', 57', 83'	Report	Puč 12'; Nejedlý 45', 75'; Zeman 60'	Stadium: White Hart Lane; Attendance: 50,000; Referee: John Langenus (Belgium)

=== 1938 ===
9 April Home Championship	England	0–1	Scotland	London, England
		Report	Walker 6'	Stadium: Wembley Stadium; Attendance: 93,267; Referee: William Hamilton (Ireland)

14 May International friendly	Germany	3–6	England	Berlin, Germany
	Gellesch 20'; Gauchel 44'; Pesser 85'	Report	Bastin 16'; Robinson 26', 49'; Broome 29'; Matthews 41'; Goulden 85'	Stadium: Olympiastadion; Attendance: 105,000; Referee: John Langenus (Belgium)

21 May International friendly	Switzerland	2–1	England	Zürich, Switzerland
	Aeby; Abegglen	Report	Bastin (pen.)	Stadium: Hardturm; Attendance: 25,000; Referee: Peco Bauwens (Germany)

26 May International friendly	France	2–4	England	Paris, France
	Jordan 32'; Nicolas 36'	Report	Broome 6'; Drake 34', 40'; Bastin 85' (pen.)	Stadium: Colombes; Attendance: 46,920; Referee: Louis Baert (Belgium)

22 October Home Championship	Wales	4–2	England	Cardiff, Wales
	Astley; Hopkins; B. Jones	Report	Lawton (pen.); Matthews	Stadium: Ninian Park; Attendance: 55,000; Referee: William Hamilton (Ireland)

26 October International friendly (Note: As it did not take place against a standard national opponent, FIFA no longer considers this match to be valid as a full international; however, the FA still does so.)	England	3–0	The Rest of Europe	London, England
	Hall 20'; Lawton 39'; Goulden 73'	Report		Stadium: Highbury; Attendance: 40,185; Referee: Arthur Jewell (England)

9 November International friendly	England	4–0	Norway	Newcastle upon Tyne, England
	Smith 13', 40'; Dix 20'; Lawton 35'	Report		Stadium: St James' Park; Attendance: 39,887; Referee: James Martin (Scotland)

18 November Home Championship	England	7–0	Ireland	Manchester, England
	Lawton 8'; Hall 36', 38', 40', 55', 65'; Matthews 75'	Report		Stadium: Old Trafford; Attendance: 40,000; Referee: Peter Craigmyle (Scotland)

=== 1939 ===
15 April Home Championship	Scotland	1 – 2	England	Glasgow, Scotland
	Dougal 20'	Report	Beasley 67'; Lawton 88'	Stadium: Hampden Park; Attendance: 149,269; Referee: William Hamilton (Ireland)

13 May International Friendly	Italy	2 – 2	England	Milan, Italy
	Biavati 48'; Piola 64'	Report	Lawton 19'; Hall 77'	Stadium: San Siro; Attendance: 60,000; Referee: Peco Bauwens (Germany)

18 May International Friendly	Yugoslavia	2 – 1	England	Belgrade, Yugoslavia
	Glišović 16'; Perlić 63'	Report	Broome 49'	Stadium: Beogradski Sport Klub Stadium; Attendance: 35,000; Referee: Georges Capdeville (France)

24 May International Friendly	Romania	0 – 2	England	Bucharest, Romania
		Report	Goulden 7'; Welsh 53'	Stadium: Stadionul ANEF; Attendance: 40,000; Referee: John Langenus (Belgium)

== 1940s ==
=== 1946 ===
28 September Home Championship	Ireland	2 – 7	England	Belfast, Northern Ireland
	Lockhart	Report	Carter 1'; Mannion 17', 28', 61'; Finney 60'; Lawton 80'; Langton 83'	Stadium: Windsor Park; Attendance: 57,000; Referee: Willie Webb (Scotland)

30 September International Friendly	Republic of Ireland	0 – 1	England	Dublin, Ireland
		Report	Finney 82'	Stadium: Dalymount Park; Attendance: 23,000; Referee: Willie Webb (Scotland)

12 November Home Championship	England	3 – 0	Wales	Manchester, England
	Mannion 8', 16'; Lawton 39'	Report		Stadium: Maine Road; Attendance: 59,250; Referee: Willie Webb (Scotland)

27 November International Friendly	England	8 – 2	Netherlands	Huddersfield, England
	Lawton 20', 24', 35', 78'; Carter 30', 71'; Mannion 34'; Finney 44'	Report	Bergman 37'; Smit 87'	Stadium: Leeds Road; Attendance: 35,000; Referee: James Martin (Scotland)

=== 1947 ===
12 April Home Championship	England	1 – 1	Scotland	London, England
	Carter 56'	Report	McLaren 16'	Stadium: Wembley Stadium; Attendance: 98,250; Referee: Charles Delasalle (France)

3 May International Friendly	England	3 – 0	France	Highbury, England
	Finney 50'; Mannion 64'; Carter 77'	Report		Stadium: Arsenal Stadium; Attendance: 54,500; Referee: Louis Baert (Belgium)

18 May International Friendly	Switzerland	1 – 0	England	Zürich, Switzerland
	Fatton 27'	Report		Stadium: Hardturm; Attendance: 30,000; Referee: Victor Sdez (France)

25 May International Friendly	Portugal	0 – 10	England	Lisbon, Portugal
		Report	Lawton 1', 11', 38', 61'; Mortensen 2', 59', 71', 77'; Finney 21'; Matthews 85'	Stadium: Estádio Nacional; Attendance: 62,000; Referee: Charles Delasalle (France)

21 September International Friendly	Belgium	2 – 5	England	Brussels, Belgium
	Mermans 34'; De Cleyn 53'	Report	Lawton 1', 63'; Mortensen 15'; Finney 22', 60'	Stadium: Heysel Stadium; Attendance: 62,500; Referee: James Martin (Scotland)

18 October Home Championship	Wales	0 – 3	England	Cardiff, Wales
		Report	Finney 6'; Mortensen 11'; Lawton 25'	Stadium: Ninian Park; Attendance: 55,000; Referee: James Martin (Scotland)

5 November Home Championship	England	2 – 2	Ireland	Liverpool, Wales
	Mannion 84'; Lawton 86'	Report	Walsh 55'; Doherty 90'	Stadium: Goodison Park; Attendance: 68,000; Referee: Peter Fitzpatrick (Scotland)

19 November International Friendly	England	4 – 2	Sweden	London, England
	Mortensen 15', 35', 86'; Lawton 18' (pen.)	Report	Nordahl 22'; Gren 68' (pen.)	Stadium: Highbury; Attendance: 44,250; Referee: Willie Webb (Scotland)

=== 1948 ===
10 April Home Championship	Scotland	0 – 2	England	Glasgow, Scotland
		Report	Finney 44'; Mortensen 64'	Stadium: Hampden Park; Attendance: 135,376; Referee: David Maxwell (Ireland)

16 May International Friendly	Italy	0 – 4	England	Turin, Italy
		Report	Mortensen 4'; Lawton 23'; Finney 70', 72'	Stadium: Stadio Comunale; Attendance: 58,000; Referee: Joaquin Diez Garcia (Spain)

26 September International Friendly	Denmark	0 – 0	England	Copenhagen, Denmark
		Report		Stadium: Idrætsparken; Attendance: 41,000; Referee: Karel van der Meer (Netherlands)

9 October Home Championship	Ireland	2 – 6	England	Belfast, Northern Ireland
	Walsh 50', 90'	Report	Matthews 27'; Mortensen 63', 68', 77'; Milburn 65'; Pearson 79'	Stadium: Windsor Park; Attendance: 53,000; Referee: Willie Webb (Scotland)

10 November Home Championship	England	1 – 0	Wales	Birmingham, England
	Finney 39'	Report		Stadium: Villa Park; Attendance: 68,750; Referee: Jack Mowat (Scotland)

2 December International Friendly	England	6 – 0	Switzerland	London, England
	Haines 5', 36'; Hancocks 25', 65'; Rowley 55'; Milburn 66'	Report		Stadium: Highbury; Attendance: 35,000; Referee: Karel van der Meer (Netherlands)

=== 1949 ===
9 April Home Championship	England	1 – 3	Scotland	London, England
	Milburn 75'	Report	Mason 29'; Steel 52'; Reilly 61'	Stadium: Wembley Stadium; Attendance: 98,188; Referee: Sandy Griffiths (Wales)

13 May International Friendly	Sweden	3 – 1	England	Stockholm, Sweden
	Carlsson 2'; Jeppson 36'; Jönsson 43'	Report	Finney 67'	Stadium: Råsunda; Attendance: 37,500; Referee: Giovanni Galeati (Italy)

18 May International Friendly	Norway	1 – 4	England	Oslo, Norway
	Andresen 52'	Report	Mullen 5'; Finney 38'; Spydevold 60' (o.g.); Morris 70'	Stadium: Ullevaal; Attendance: 36,000; Referee: J. Andersson (Sweden)

22 May International Friendly	France	1 – 3	England	Paris, France
	Moreel 1'	Report	Morris 8', 86'; Wright 24'	Stadium: Colombes; Attendance: 61,500; Referee: Karel van der Meer (Netherlands)

15 September International Friendly	England	2–0	(French Indochina) French Cochinchina	London, England
				Stadium: Empire Stadium

21 September International Friendly	England	0 – 2	Republic of Ireland	Liverpool, England
		Report	Martin 33' (pen.); Farrell 85'	Stadium: Goodison Park; Attendance: 52,000; Referee: Jack Mowat (Scotland)

15 October Home Championship; FIFA WC Qualifying; Group 1	Wales	1 – 4	England	Cardiff, Wales
	Griffiths 80'	Report	Mortensen 22'; Milburn 29', 34', 66'	Stadium: Ninian Park; Attendance: 61,000; Referee: Jack Mowat (Scotland)

16 November Home Championship; FIFA WC Qualifying; Group 1	England	9 – 2	Ireland	Manchester, England
	Rowley 5', 47', 55', 58'; Froggatt 28'; Pearson 31', 75'; Mortensen 35', 50'	Report	Smyth 52'; Brennan 85'	Stadium: Maine Road; Attendance: 70,000; Referee: Sandy Griffiths (Wales)

30 November International Friendly	England	2 – 0	Italy	London, England
	Rowley 75'; Wright 79'	Report		Stadium: White Hart Lane; Attendance: 60,000; Referee: Jack Mowat (Scotland)

== 1950s ==
=== 1950 ===
15 April Home Championship; FIFA WC Qualifying; Group 1	Scotland	0 – 1	England	Glasgow, Scotland
		Report	Bentley 63'	Stadium: Hampden Park; Attendance: 133,250; Referee: Reg Leafe (England)

14 May International Friendly	Portugal	3 – 5	England	Lisbon, Portugal
	Ben David 47', 59'; Vasques 70'	Report	Finney 4' (pen.), 28', 55', 72' (pen.); Mortensen 15'	Stadium: National Stadium; Attendance: 70,000; Referee: Giuseppe Carpani (Italy)

18 May International Friendly	Belgium	1 – 4	England	Brussels, Belgium
	Mermans 43'	Report	Mullen 46'; Mortensen 65'; Mannion 68'; Bentley 86'	Stadium: Heysel Stadium; Attendance: 55,750; Referee: Raymond Vincenti (France)

25 June 1950 FIFA World Cup; Group 2	Chile	0 – 2	England	Rio de Janeiro, Brazil
		Report	Mortensen 27'; Mannion 51'	Stadium: Maracanã; Attendance: 29,703; Referee: Karel van der Meer (Netherlands)

29 June 1950 FIFA World Cup; Group 2	United States	1 – 0	England	Belo Horizonte, Brazil
	Gaetjens 38'	Report		Stadium: Independência; Attendance: 10,151; Referee: Generoso Datillo (Italy)

2 July 1950 FIFA World Cup; Group 2	Spain	1 – 0	England	Rio de Janeiro, Brazil
	Zarra 49'	Report		Stadium: Maracanã; Attendance: 74,462; Referee: Giovanni Galeati (Italy)

7 October Home Championship	Ireland	1 – 4	England	Belfast, Northern Ireland
	McMorran 70'	Report	Baily 43', 86'; Lee 64'; Wright 85'	Stadium: Windsor Park; Attendance: 46,000; Referee: George Mitchell (Scotland)

15 November Home Championship	England	4 – 2	Wales	Sunderland, England
	Baily 31', 40'; Mannion 66'; Milburn 90'	Report	Ford 59', 74'	Stadium: Roker Park; Attendance: 50,250; Referee: Jack Mowat (Scotland)

22 November International Friendly	England	2 – 2	Yugoslavia	London, England
	Lofthouse 29', 34'	Report	Compton 40' (o.g.); Živanović 72'	Stadium: Highbury; Attendance: 62,000; Referee: Karel van der Meer (Netherlands)

=== 1951 ===
14 April Home Championship	England	2 – 3	Scotland	London, England
	Hassall 26'; Finney 63'	Report	Johnstone 33'; Reilly 47'; Liddell 54'	Stadium: Wembley Stadium; Attendance: 98,750; Referee: Thomas Mitchell (Ireland)

9 May International Friendly	England	2 – 1	Argentina	London, England
	Mortensen 79'; Milburn 86'	Report	Boyé 18'	Stadium: Wembley Stadium; Attendance: 99,000; Referee: Sandy Griffiths (Wales)

19 May International Friendly	England	5 – 2	Portugal	Liverpool, England
	Nicholson 1'; Milburn 9', 83'; Finney 75'; Hassall 87'	Report	Patalino 2'; Albano 48'	Stadium: Goodison Park; Attendance: 52,750; Referee: Louis Baert (Belgium)

3 October International Friendly	England	2 – 2	France	London, England
	Firoud 4' (o.g.); Medley 32'	Report	Doye 18'; Alpsteg 19'	Stadium: Highbury; Attendance: 57,500; Referee: Jack Mowat (Scotland)

20 October Home Championship	Wales	1 – 1	England	Cardiff, Wales
	Foulkes 3'	Report	Baily 6'	Stadium: Ninian Park; Attendance: 51,500; Referee: Douglas Gerrard (Scotland)

14 November Home Championship	England	2 – 0	Ireland	Birmingham, England
	Lofthouse 40', 83'	Report		Stadium: Villa Park; Attendance: 58,000; Referee: Sandy Griffiths (Wales)

28 November International Friendly	England	2 – 2	Austria	London, England
	Ramsey 68' (pen.); Lofthouse 75'	Report	Melchior 47'; Stojaspal 87' (pen.)	Stadium: Wembley Stadium; Attendance: 98,000; Referee: Jack Mowat (Scotland)

=== 1952 ===
15 April Home Championship	Scotland	1 – 2	England	Glasgow, Scotland
	Reilly 76'	Report	Pearson 10', 44'	Stadium: Hampden Park; Attendance: 134,504; Referee: Patrick Morris (Northern Ireland)

18 May International Friendly	Italy	1 – 1	England	Florence, Italy
	Amadei 58'	Report	Broadis 4'	Stadium: Stadio Comunale; Attendance: 93,000; Referee: A. Beranek (Austria)

25 May International Friendly	Austria	2 – 3	England	Vienna, Austria
	Huber 27'; Dienst 42'	Report	Lofthouse 25', 83'; Sewell 28'	Stadium: Praterstadion; Attendance: 65,500; Referee: Giuseppe Carpani (Italy)

28 May International Friendly	Switzerland	0 – 3	England	Zürich, Switzerland
		Report	Sewell 13'; Lofthouse 51', 87'	Stadium: Hardturm; Attendance: 32,000; Referee: Louis Baert (Belgium)

4 October Home Championship	Ireland	2 – 2	England	Belfast, Northern Ireland
	Tully 15', 46'	Report	Lofthouse 2'; Elliott 87'	Stadium: Windsor Park; Attendance: 60,000; Referee: Douglas Gerrard (Scotland)

12 November Home Championship	England	5 – 2	Wales	London, England
	Finney 8'; Lofthouse 10', 75'; J. Froggatt 44'; Bentley 47'	Report	Ford 15', 49'	Stadium: Wembley Stadium; Attendance: 93,500; Referee: Douglas Gerrard (Scotland)

26 November International Friendly	England	5 – 0	Belgium	London, England
	Elliott 4', 48'; Lofthouse 42', 86'; R. Froggatt 60'	Report		Stadium: Wembley Stadium; Attendance: 65,000; Referee: Leo Horn (Netherlands)

=== 1953 ===
18 April Home Championship	England	2 – 2	Scotland	London, England
	Broadis 19', 70'	Report	Reilly 55', 90'	Stadium: Wembley Stadium; Attendance: 97,000; Referee: Thomas Mitchell (Ireland)

17 May International Friendly	Argentina	Abandoned	England	Buenos Aires, Argentina
		Report		Stadium: Estadio Monumental; Attendance: 85,000; Referee: Arthur Ellis (England)
Note: The game was stopped with a score of 0-0 and then abandoned during the mid-first half due rain.

24 May International Friendly	Chile	1 – 2	England	Santiago, Chile
	Díaz 83'	Report	Taylor 48'; Lofthouse 68'	Stadium: Estadio Nacional; Attendance: 70,000; Referee: Arthur Ellis (England)

31 May International Friendly	Uruguay	2 – 1	England	Montevideo, Uruguay
	Abbadie 27'; Míguez 60'	Report	Taylor 89'	Stadium: Estadio Centenario; Attendance: 80,000; Referee: Arthur Ellis (England)

8 June International Friendly	United States	3 – 6	England	New York, USA
	Decker; Athineos	Report	Broadis; Lofthouse; Finney; Froggatt	Stadium: Yankee Stadium; Attendance: 10,000; Referee: Sam Galin (USA)

10 October Home Championship; FIFA WC Qualifying; Group 3	Wales	1 – 4	England	Cardiff, Wales
	Allchurch 22'	Report	Wilshaw 45', 50'; Lofthouse 51', 52'	Stadium: Ninian Park; Attendance: 61,000; Referee: Charlie Faultless (Scotland)

21 October International Friendly (Note: As it did not take place against a standard national opponent, FIFA no longer considers this match to be valid as a full international; however, the FA still does so.)	England	4 – 4	The Rest of Europe	London, England
	Mortensen 8'; Mullen 43', 49'; Ramsey 90' (pen.)	Report	Kubala 5' (pen.), 64'; Boniperti 15', 39'	Stadium: Wembley Stadium; Attendance: 97,000; Referee: Sandy Griffiths (Wales)

11 November Home Championship; FIFA WC Qualifying; Group 3	England	3 – 1	Ireland	Liverpool, England
	Hassall 10', 60'; Lofthouse 75'	Report	McMorran 54'	Stadium: Goodison Park; Attendance: 61,000; Referee: Robert Smith (Wales)

25 November International Friendly	England	3–6	Hungary	London, England
	Sewell 13'; Mortensen 38'; Ramsey 57' (pen.)	Report	Hidegkuti 1', 20', 53'; Puskás 24', 29'; Bozsik 50'	Stadium: Wembley Stadium; Attendance: 100,000; Referee: Leo Horn (Netherlands)

=== 1954 ===
3 April Home Championship; FIFA WC Qualifying; Group 3	Scotland	2 – 4	England	Glasgow, Scotland
	Brown 7'; Ormond 89'	Report	Broadis 13'; Nicholls 50'; Allen 68'; Mullen 83'	Stadium: Hampden Park; Attendance: 134,554; Referee: Thomas Mitchell (Northern Ireland)

16 May International Friendly	Yugoslavia	1 – 0	England	Belgrade, Yugoslavia
	Mitić 87'	Report		Stadium: Partizan Stadium; Attendance: 59,000; Referee: Carl Erich Steiner (Austria)

23 May International Friendly	Hungary	7 – 1	England	Budapest, Hungary
	Lantos 10'; Puskás 17', 71'; Kocsis 19', 57'; Hidegkuti 59'; Tóth 63'	Report	Broadis 68'	Stadium: Népstadion; Attendance: 92,000; Referee: Giorgio Bernardi (Italy)

17 June 1954 FIFA World Cup; Group 4	Belgium	4 – 4 (a.e.t.)	England	Basle, Switzerland
	Anoul 5', 74'; Coppens 67'; Dickinson 93' (o.g.)	Report	Broadis 25', 62'; Lofthouse 37', 91'	Stadium: St. Jakob Stadium; Attendance: 14,000; Referee: Emil Schmetzer (West Germany)

20 June 1954 FIFA World Cup; Group 4	Switzerland	0 – 2	England	Berne, Switzerland
		Report	Mullen 43'; Wilshaw 69'	Stadium: Wankdorf Stadium; Attendance: 60,000; Referee: István Zsolt (Hungary)

26 June 1954 FIFA World Cup; Quarter-finals	Uruguay	4 – 2	England	Basle, Switzerland
	Borges 5'; Valera 40'; Schiaffino 50'; Ambrois 79'	Report	Lofthouse 16'; Finney 67'	Stadium: St. Jakob Stadium; Attendance: 50,000; Referee: Carl Erich Steiner (Austria)

2 October Home Championship	Northern Ireland	0 – 2	England	Belfast, Northern Ireland
		Report	Haynes 75'; Revie 78'	Stadium: Windsor Park; Attendance: 50,000; Referee: Charlie Faultless (Scotland)

10 November Home Championship	England	3 – 2	Wales	London, England
	Bentley 70', 74', 82'	Report	Charles 35', 75'	Stadium: Wembley Stadium; Attendance: 91,112; Referee: Charlie Faultless (Scotland)

1 December International Friendly	England	3 – 1	West Germany	London, England
	Bentley 28'; Allen 48'; Shackleton 80'	Report	Beck 75'	Stadium: Wembley Stadium; Attendance: 100,000; Referee: Vincenzo Orlandini (Italy)

=== 1955 ===
2 April Home Championship	England	7 – 2	Scotland	London, England
	Wilshaw 1', 70', 73', 83'; Lofthouse 7', 27'; Revie 24'	Report	Reilly 10'; Docherty 88'	Stadium: Wembley Stadium; Attendance: 96,847; Referee: Sandy Griffiths (Wales)

15 May International Friendly	France	1 – 0	England	Paris, France
	Kopa 37' (pen.)	Report		Stadium: Colombes; Attendance: 54,750; Referee: Emil Schmetzer (West Germany)

18 May International Friendly	Spain	1 – 1	England	Madrid, Spain
	Rial 65'	Report	Bentley 38'	Stadium: Bernabéu Stadium; Attendance: 125,000; Referee: R. Pieri (Italy)

22 May International Friendly	Portugal	3 – 1	England	Oporto, Portugal
	Águas 24', 83'; Matateu 79'	Report	Bentley 19'	Stadium: Estádio das Antas; Attendance: 55,000; Referee: Giorgio Bernardi (Italy)

2 October International Friendly	Denmark	1 – 5	England	Copenhagen, Denmark
	Lundberg 62'	Report	Revie 26' (pen.), 53'; Lofthouse 31', 41'; Bradford 80'	Stadium: Idrætsparken; Attendance: 53,000; Referee: Giorgio Bernardi (Italy)

22 October Home Championship	Wales	2 – 1	England	Cardiff, Wales
	Tapscott 41'; Jones 43'	Report	Charles 51' (o.g.)	Stadium: Ninian Park; Attendance: 60,000; Referee: Thomas Mitchell (Northern Ireland)

2 November Home Championship	England	3 – 0	Northern Ireland	London, England
	Wilshaw 51', 53'; Finney 88'	Report		Stadium: Wembley Stadium; Attendance: 62,000; Referee: Sandy Griffiths (Wales)

30 November International Friendly	England	4 – 1	Spain	London, England
	Atyeo 12'; Perry 13', 60'; Finney 59'	Report	Arieta 80'	Stadium: Wembley Stadium; Attendance: 85,000; Referee: Maurice Guigue (France)

=== 1956 ===
14 April Home Championship	Scotland	1 – 1	England	Glasgow, Scotland
	Leggat 60'	Report	Haynes 89'	Stadium: Hampden Park; Attendance: 132,817; Referee: Leo Callaghan (Wales)

9 May International Friendly	England	4 – 2	Brazil	London, England
	Taylor 3', 65'; Grainger 5', 84'	Report	Paulinho 53'; Didi 55'	Stadium: Wembley Stadium; Attendance: 100,000; Referee: Maurice Guigue (France)

16 May International Friendly	Sweden	0 – 0	England	Stockholm, Sweden
		Report		Stadium: Råsunda Stadium; Attendance: 38,000; Referee: Leo Horn (Netherlands)

20 May International Friendly	Finland	1 – 5	England	Helsinki, Finland
	Forsgren	Report	Wilshaw; Haynes; Astall; Lofthouse	Stadium: Olympic Stadium; Attendance: 38,000; Referee: J. Jorgensen (Denmark)

26 May International Friendly	West Germany	1 – 3	England	Berlin, West Germany
	F. Walter 86'	Report	Edwards 25'; Grainger 63'; Haynes 69'	Stadium: Olympiastadion; Attendance: 95,000; Referee: István Zsolt (Hungary)

6 October Home Championship	Northern Ireland	1 – 1	England	Belfast, Northern Ireland
	McIlroy 10'	Report	S. Matthews 2'	Stadium: Windsor Park; Attendance: 58,500; Referee: Hugh Phillips (Scotland)

14 November Home Championship	England	3 – 1	Wales	London, England
	Haynes 52'; Brooks 55'; Finney 75'	Report	Charles 8'	Stadium: Wembley Stadium; Attendance: 95,000; Referee: Hugh Phillips (Scotland)

28 November International Friendly	England	3 – 0	Yugoslavia	London, England
	Brooks 13'; Taylor 65', 89'	Report		Stadium: Wembley Stadium; Attendance: 78,500; Referee: E. Harzic (France)

5 December 1958 FIFA World Cup; Qualification Group 1	England	5 – 2	Denmark	Wolverhampton, England
	Taylor 18', 20', 48'; Edwards 56', 77'	Report	O.B. Nielsen 30', 52'	Stadium: Molineux; Attendance: 53,000; Referee: Maurice Guigue (France)

=== 1957 ===
6 April Home Championship	England	2 – 1	Scotland	London, England
	Kevan 63'; Edwards 84'	Report	Ring 1'	Stadium: Wembley Stadium; Attendance: 97,520; Referee: Pieter Roomer (Netherlands)

8 May 1958 FIFA World Cup; Qualification Group 1	England	5 – 1	Republic of Ireland	London, England
	Taylor 8', 17', 40'; Atyeo 38', 90'	Report	Curtis 56'	Stadium: Wembley Stadium; Attendance: 52,000; Referee: Hugh Phillips (Scotland)

15 May 1958 FIFA World Cup; Qualification Group 1	Denmark	1 – 4	England	Copenhagen, Denmark
	J. Jensen 27'	Report	Haynes 28'; Taylor 71', 86'; Atyeo 75'	Stadium: Idrætsparken; Attendance: 45,000; Referee: Albert Dusch (West Germany)

19 May 1958 FIFA World Cup; Qualification Group 1	Republic of Ireland	1 – 1	England	Dublin, Ireland
	Ringstead 3'	Report	Atyeo 90'	Stadium: Dalymount Park; Attendance: 47,000; Referee: Hugh Phillips (Scotland)

19 October Home Championship	Wales	0 – 4	England	Cardiff, Wales
		Report	Hopkins 2' (o.g.); Haynes 44', 67'; Finney 64'	Stadium: Ninian Park; Attendance: 58,000; Referee: Thomas Mitchell (Northern Ireland)

6 November Home Championship	England	2 – 3	Northern Ireland	London, England
	A'Court 58'; Edwards 80'	Report	McIlroy 31' (pen.); McCrory 59'; Simpson 71'	Stadium: Wembley Stadium; Attendance: 42,000; Referee: Sandy Griffiths (Wales)

27 November International Friendly	England	4 – 0	France	London, England
	Taylor 3', 33'; Robson 24', 84'	Report		Stadium: Wembley Stadium; Attendance: 60,000; Referee: Nikolay Latyshev (Soviet Union)

=== 1958 ===
19 April Home Championship	Scotland	0 – 4	England	Glasgow, Scotland
		Report	Douglas 22'; Kevan 35', 74'; Charlton 66'	Stadium: Hampden Park; Attendance: 127,874; Referee: Albert Dusch (West Germany)

7 May International Friendly	England	2 – 1	Portugal	London, England
	Charlton 25', 62'	Report	Duarte 51'	Stadium: Wembley Stadium; Attendance: 65,000; Referee: Albert Alsteen (Belgium)

11 May International Friendly	Yugoslavia	5 – 0	England	Belgrade, Yugoslavia
	Milutinović 23'; Petaković 56', 77', 83'; Veselinović 86'	Report		Stadium: Partizan Stadium; Attendance: 58,000; Referee: István Zsolt (Hungary)

18 May International Friendly	Soviet Union	1 – 1	England	Moscow, Soviet Union
	V. Ivanov 78'	Report	Kevan 45'	Stadium: Lenin Stadium; Attendance: 105,000; Referee: Fritz Seipelt (Austria)

8 June 1958 FIFA World Cup; Group 4	Soviet Union	2 – 2	England	Gothenburg, Sweden
	Simonyan 13'; A. Ivanov 55'	Report	Kevan 66'; Finney 85' (pen.)	Stadium: Ullevi; Attendance: 49,348; Referee: István Zsolt (Hungary)

11 June 1958 FIFA World Cup; Group 4	Brazil	0 – 0	England	Gothenburg, Sweden
		Report		Stadium: Ullevi; Attendance: 40,895; Referee: Albert Dusch (West Germany)

15 June 1958 FIFA World Cup; Group 4	Austria	2 – 2	England	Borås, Sweden
	Koller 15'; Körner 71'	Report	Haynes 56'; Kevan 74'	Stadium: Ryavallen; Attendance: 16,800; Referee: Jan Bronkhorst (Netherlands)

17 June 1958 FIFA World Cup; Group 4 Play-Off	Soviet Union	1 – 0	England	Gothenburg, Sweden
	Ilyin 68'	Report		Stadium: Ullevi; Attendance: 23,182; Referee: Albert Dusch (West Germany)

4 October Home Championship	Northern Ireland	3 – 3	England	Belfast, Northern Ireland
	Cush 16'; Peacock 54'; Casey 67'	Report	Charlton 31', 77'; Finney 61'	Stadium: Windsor Park; Attendance: 58,000; Referee: Bobby Davidson (Scotland)

22 October International Friendly	England	5 – 0	Soviet Union	London, England
	Haynes 45', 63', 82'; Charlton 84' (pen.); Lofthouse 90'	Report		Stadium: Wembley Stadium; Attendance: 100,000; Referee: Maurice Guigue (France)

26 November Home Championship	England	2 – 2	Wales	Birmingham, England
	Broadbent 42', 75'	Report	Tapscott 15'; Allchurch 70'	Stadium: Villa Park; Attendance: 40,500; Referee: Albert Dusch (West Germany)

=== 1959 ===
11 April Home Championship	England	1 – 0	Scotland	London, England
	Charlton 59'	Report		Stadium: Wembley Stadium; Attendance: 98,329; Referee: Joaquim Campos (Portugal)

6 May International Friendly	England	2 – 2	Italy	London, England
	Charlton 26'; Bradley 38'	Report	Brighenti 56'; Mariani 61'	Stadium: Wembley Stadium; Attendance: 91,000; Referee: Albert Dusch (West Germany)

13 May International Friendly	Brazil	2 – 0	England	Rio de Janeiro, Brazil
	Julinho; Henrique	Report		Stadium: Maracanã; Attendance: 160,000; Referee: Juan Brozzi (Argentina)

17 May International Friendly	Peru	4 – 1	England	Lima, Peru
	Seminario; Joya	Report	Greaves	Stadium: National Stadium; Attendance: 54,000; Referee: Erwin Hieger (Austria)

24 May International Friendly	Mexico	2 – 1	England	Mexico City, Mexico
	Cárdenas 26'; Monteón 67'	Report	Kevan 14'	Stadium: Estadio Olímpico Universitario; Attendance: 82,000; Referee: Eunapio Queiroz (Brazil)

28 May International Friendly	United States	1 – 8	England	Los Angeles, USA
	Murphy 9'	Report	Bradley 35'; Flowers 52', 69'; Charlton 62', 82' (pen.), 85'; Kevan 74'; Haynes 87'	Stadium: Wrigley Field; Attendance: 13,000; Referee: Ray Morgan (Canada)

17 October Home Championship	Wales	1 – 1	England	Cardiff, Wales
	Moore	Report	Greaves	Stadium: Ninian Park; Attendance: 60,000; Referee: Thomas Mitchell (Northern Ireland)

28 October International Friendly	England	2 – 3	Sweden	London, England
	Connelly 9'; Charlton 81'	Report	Simonsson 52', 60'; Salomonsson 75'	Stadium: Wembley Stadium; Attendance: 72,000; Referee: Bobby Davidson (Scotland)

18 November Home Championship	England	2 – 1	Northern Ireland	London, England
	Baker 17'; Parry 90'	Report	Bingham 89'	Stadium: Wembley Stadium; Attendance: 60,000; Referee: Leo Callaghan (Wales)
