= 1937–38 in Scottish football =

Football in Scotland
- Season: 1937–38

1937–38 in Scottish football

Division One champions
- Celtic

Division Two champions
- Raith Rovers

Scottish Cup winners
- East Fife

Junior Cup winners
- Cambuslang Rangers

Scotland national team
- 1938 BHC

The 1937–38 season was the 65th season of competitive football in Scotland and the 48th season of the Scottish Football League.

== Scottish League Division One ==
| Pos | Team | Pld | W | D | L | GF | GA | GD | Pts |
|---|---|---|---|---|---|---|---|---|---|
| 1 | Celtic | 38 | 27 | 7 | 4 | 114 | 42 | +72 | 61 |
| 2 | Heart of Midlothian | 38 | 26 | 6 | 6 | 90 | 50 | +40 | 58 |
| 3 | Rangers | 38 | 18 | 13 | 7 | 75 | 49 | +26 | 49 |
| 4 | Falkirk | 38 | 19 | 9 | 10 | 82 | 52 | +30 | 47 |
| 5 | Motherwell | 38 | 17 | 10 | 11 | 78 | 69 | +9 | 44 |
| 6 | Aberdeen | 38 | 15 | 9 | 14 | 74 | 59 | +15 | 39 |
| 7 | Partick Thistle | 38 | 15 | 9 | 14 | 68 | 70 | −2 | 39 |
| 8 | St Johnstone | 38 | 16 | 7 | 15 | 78 | 81 | −3 | 39 |
| 9 | Third Lanark | 38 | 11 | 13 | 14 | 68 | 73 | −5 | 35 |
| 10 | Hibernian | 38 | 11 | 13 | 14 | 57 | 65 | −8 | 35 |
| 11 | Arbroath | 38 | 11 | 13 | 14 | 58 | 79 | −21 | 35 |
| 12 | Queen's Park | 38 | 11 | 12 | 15 | 59 | 74 | −15 | 34 |
| 13 | Hamilton Academical | 38 | 13 | 7 | 18 | 81 | 76 | +5 | 33 |
| 14 | St Mirren | 38 | 14 | 5 | 19 | 58 | 66 | −8 | 33 |
| 15 | Clyde | 38 | 10 | 13 | 15 | 68 | 78 | −10 | 33 |
| 16 | Queen of the South | 38 | 11 | 11 | 16 | 58 | 71 | −13 | 33 |
| 17 | Ayr United | 38 | 9 | 15 | 14 | 66 | 85 | −19 | 33 |
| 18 | Kilmarnock | 38 | 12 | 9 | 17 | 65 | 91 | −26 | 33 |
| 19 | Dundee | 38 | 13 | 6 | 19 | 70 | 74 | −4 | 32 |
| 20 | Morton | 38 | 6 | 3 | 29 | 64 | 127 | −63 | 15 |

Source: RSSSF

Champions: Celtic
Relegated: Dundee, Morton

== Scottish League Division Two ==
| Pos | Team | Pld | W | D | L | GF | GA | GD | Pts | Promotion or relegation |
|---|---|---|---|---|---|---|---|---|---|---|
| 1 | Raith Rovers | 34 | 27 | 5 | 2 | 142 | 54 | +88 | 59 | Promotion to the 1938–39 First Division |
| 2 | Albion Rovers | 34 | 20 | 8 | 6 | 97 | 50 | +47 | 48 | Promotion to the 1938–39 First Division |
| 3 | Airdrieonians | 34 | 21 | 5 | 8 | 100 | 53 | +47 | 47 | |
| 4 | St Bernard's | 34 | 20 | 5 | 9 | 75 | 49 | +26 | 45 | |
| 5 | Cowdenbeath | 34 | 17 | 9 | 8 | 115 | 71 | +44 | 43 | |
| 6 | East Fife | 34 | 19 | 5 | 10 | 94 | 61 | +33 | 43 | |
| 7 | Dumbarton | 34 | 17 | 5 | 12 | 85 | 66 | +19 | 39 | |
| 8 | Stenhousemuir | 34 | 17 | 5 | 12 | 87 | 78 | +9 | 39 | |
| 9 | Dunfermline Athletic | 34 | 17 | 5 | 12 | 82 | 76 | +6 | 39 | |
| 10 | Leith Athletic | 34 | 16 | 5 | 13 | 71 | 56 | +15 | 37 | |
| 11 | Alloa Athletic | 34 | 11 | 4 | 19 | 78 | 106 | −28 | 26 | |
| 12 | King's Park | 34 | 11 | 4 | 19 | 64 | 96 | −32 | 26 | |
| 13 | East Stirlingshire | 34 | 9 | 7 | 18 | 55 | 95 | −40 | 25 | |
| 14 | Dundee United | 34 | 9 | 5 | 20 | 69 | 104 | −35 | 23 | |
| 15 | Forfar Athletic | 34 | 8 | 6 | 20 | 67 | 100 | −33 | 22 | |
| 16 | Montrose | 34 | 7 | 8 | 19 | 56 | 88 | −32 | 22 | |
| 17 | Edinburgh City | 34 | 7 | 3 | 24 | 77 | 125 | −48 | 17 | |
| 18 | Brechin City | 34 | 5 | 2 | 27 | 53 | 139 | −86 | 12 | |

Source: "1937-1938 Division 2 - SPFL Archive". SPFL.

Promoted: Raith Rovers, Albion Rovers

== Scottish Cup ==
East Fife were winners of the Scottish Cup after a 4–2 extra time win in a replay against Kilmarnock.

== Other honours ==
=== National ===
| Competition | Winner | Score | Runner-up |
|---|---|---|---|
| Scottish Qualifying Cup – North | Elgin City | 6–2 | Blairgowrie |
| Scottish Qualifying Cup – South | Stranraer | 5–3 | Bo'ness |

=== County ===
| Competition | Winner | Score | Runner-up |
|---|---|---|---|
| Aberdeenshire Cup | Fraserburgh | 4–3 * | Peterhead |
| Ayrshire Cup | Ayr United | 7–1 | Beith |
| East of Scotland Shield | Hibernian | 4–0 | Hearts |
| Forfarshire Cup | Dundee | 3–0 | Dundee United |
| Glasgow Cup | Rangers | 2–1 | Third Lanark |
| Lanarkshire Cup | Airdrie | 4–2 * | Hamilton |
| Perthshire Cup | Blairgowrie | 8–2 * | Vale of Atholl |
| Renfrewshire Cup | St Mirren | 7–1 | Morton |
| Southern Counties Cup | Solway Star | | |
| Stirlingshire Cup | Falkirk | 4–1 * | King's Park |

- * – aggregate over two legs

=== Highland League ===
Top Three
| Pos | Team | Pld | W | D | L | GF | GA | GD | Pts |
|---|---|---|---|---|---|---|---|---|---|
| 1 | Fraserburgh | 22 | 16 | 3 | 3 | 78 | 45 | +33 | 35 |
| 2 | Clachnacuddin | 22 | 16 | 2 | 4 | 74 | 48 | +26 | 34 |
| 3 | Elgin City | 22 | 16 | 1 | 5 | 93 | 36 | +57 | 33 |

== Junior Cup ==
Cambuslang Rangers were winners of the Junior Cup after a 3–2 win over Benburb in the final.

== Scotland national team ==
| Date | Venue | Opponents | Score | Competition | Scotland scorer(s) |
|---|---|---|---|---|---|
| 30 October 1937 | Ninian Park, Cardiff (A) | Wales | 1–2 | BHC | Alex Massie |
| 10 November 1937 | Pittodrie Stadium, Aberdeen (H) | Ireland | 1–1 | BHC | James Smith |
| 8 December 1937 | Hampden Park, Glasgow (H) | Czechoslovakia | 5–0 | Friendly | Andrew Black, David McCulloch (2), Peter Buchanan, David Kinnear |
| 9 April 1938 | Wembley Stadium, London (A) | England | 1–0 | BHC | Thomas Walker |
| 21 May 1938 | Olympisch Stadion, Amsterdam (A) | Netherlands | 3–1 | Friendly | Andrew Black, Francis Murphy, Thomas Walker |

Key:

- (H) = Home match
- (A) = Away match
- BHC = British Home Championship
