= 1938–39 British Home Championship =

Tournament details
- Host country: England, Ireland, Scotland and Wales
- Dates: 8 October 1938 – 15 April 1939
- Teams: 4

Final positions
- Champions: England; Scotland; Wales

Tournament statistics
- Matches played: 6
- Goals scored: 27 (4.5 per match)
- Top scorer: (England) Willie Hall (5)

The 1938–39 British Home Championship was a football tournament played between the British Home Nations during the 1938–39 seasons and was the last edition of the tournament to be completed before the outbreak of the Second World War in August 1939 suspended all professional sporting competitions. As a result, this was the final opportunity for many spectators to see their sporting heroes in an international setting, as players such as Wales's Dai Astley or Scotland's Tommy Walker would no longer be young enough to play for their country by the time professional football began again in 1946.

The opening matches saw an immediate advantage for Wales and Scotland who beat England and Northern Ireland respectively. Scotland then followed by beating the Welsh in their second match during a close contest whilst England succeeded in victory over the Irish by a seven-goal margin to bring them into joint second place behind the Scots. During the match, Willie Hall scored five goals, an English record that has been equalled but never broken as of 2007. In the final games, Wales beat the Irish, resulting in a whitewash of three defeats for Ireland and joint first place for the Welsh. England joined Wales and Scotland on four points with a 2–1 victory over Scotland in Glasgow to share the title among the three nations, as goal difference was not at this stage used to determine position. The win was sealed by a goal from Tommy Lawton, who scored in all of England's matches

== Table ==
Team	Pld	W	D	L	GF	GA	GD	Pts
England (C)	3	2	0	1	11	5	+6	4
Wales (C)	3	2	0	1	9	6	+3	4
Scotland (C)	3	2	0	1	6	4	+2	4
Ireland	3	0	0	3	1	12	−11	0

Rules for classification: 1) points. The points system worked as follows: 2 points for a win and 1 point for a draw.
(C) Co-champions

== Results ==
8 October 1938

Ireland	0–2	Scotland
		Delaney 34'; Walker 49'

Windsor Park, Belfast
Attendance: 40,000
Referee: Herbert R. A. Mortimer (England)

22 October 1938

Wales	4–2	England
Astley; B. Jones; Hopkins		Matthews; Lawton (pen.)

Ninian Park, Cardiff

9 November 1938

Scotland	3–2	Wales
Gillick 38'; Walker 83', 84'		Astley 17'; L. Jones 85'

Tynecastle Park, Edinburgh
Attendance: 34,810
Referee: Thomas J. Thompson (England)

16 November 1938

England	7–0	Ireland
Lawton 8'; Hall 36' 38' 40' 55' 65'; Matthews 75'	Report

Old Trafford, Manchester
Attendance: 40,386
Referee: Reginald Mortimer (England)

15 March 1939

Wales	3–1	Ireland
Cumner; Glover; Boulter		Milligan

Racecourse Ground, Wrexham

15 April 1939

Scotland	1–2	England
Dougal 20'		Beasley 67'; Lawton 88'

Hampden Park, Glasgow
Attendance: 149,269
Referee: William R.Hamilton (Ireland)
