= 1952–53 British Home Championship =

Tournament details
- Host country: England, Ireland, Scotland and Wales
- Dates: 4 October 1952 – 18 April 1953
- Teams: 4

Final positions
- Champions: England; Scotland (shared)

Tournament statistics
- Matches played: 6
- Goals scored: 25 (4.17 per match)
- Top scorer(s): (England) Nat Lofthouse (Scotland) Lawrie Reilly (3 each)

The 1952–53 British Home Championship was a football tournament played between the British Home Nations throughout the 1952–53 season. The tournament saw a last minute goal by Lawrie Reilly in the final game at Wembley which salvaged a draw and thus a share in the trophy for Scotland. England were the other winners whilst both Wales and Ireland played well in a very competitive competition.

England began with a draw against a combative Irish team in a game which finished 2–2. The Scots however were able to narrowly beat Wales in Cardiff, taking the lead after the first round. In the second games, Scotland and Ireland played another score draw, keeping both sides tournament hopes alive, albeit behind England, who comprehensively beat Wales in their game. The final matches saw a battling Wales side defeat the Irish in Belfast, ending Ireland's lively hopes for the trophy and gaining some pride in the two points necessary to match Ireland. England and Scotland played out the final match knowing that the winner would take the trophy, but that a draw would share it between them as goal difference was not yet used to determine position. A very hotly contested game looked to be going England's way until the 90th minute when Reilly's late goal, his second of the game, gave half the trophy to Scotland.

== Table ==
Team	Pld	W	D	L	GF	GA	GD	Pts
England (C)	3	1	2	0	9	6	+3	4
Scotland (C)	3	1	2	0	5	4	+1	4
Ireland	3	0	2	1	5	6	−1	2
Wales	3	1	0	2	6	9	−3	2

Rules for classification: 1) points. The points system worked as follows: 2 points for a win and 1 point for a draw.
(C) Co-champions

== Results ==
4 October 1952

Ireland	2–2	England
Charlie Tully 2		Nat Lofthouse; Billy Elliott

Windsor Park, Belfast

18 October 1952

Wales	1–2	Scotland
Trevor Ford 24'		33' Allan Brown; 69' Billy Liddell

Ninian Park, Cardiff
Attendance: 60,261
Referee: Alfred Bond (England)

5 November 1952

Scotland	1–1	Ireland
Lawrie Reilly 89'		82' Jimmy D'Arcy

Hampden Park, Glasgow
Attendance: 65,229
Referee: Robert E. Smith (Wales)

12 November 1952

England	5–2	Wales
Nat Lofthouse 2 Tom Finney; Jack Froggatt; Roy Bentley		Trevor Ford 2

Wembley Stadium, London

15 April 1953

Ireland	2–3	Wales
Eddie McMorran 2		John Charles 2 Trevor Ford

Windsor Park, Belfast

18 April 1953

England	2–2	Scotland
Ivor Broadis 18', 69'		55', 89' Lawrie Reilly

Wembley Stadium, London
Attendance: 97,000
Referee: Thomas Mitchell (Northern Ireland)
