= 1958–59 British Home Championship =

Tournament details
- Host country: England, Ireland, Scotland and Wales
- Dates: 4 October 1958 – 11 April 1959
- Teams: 4

Final positions
- Champions: England; Ireland

Tournament statistics
- Matches played: 6
- Goals scored: 23 (3.83 per match)
- Top scorer: (England) Bobby Charlton (3)

The 1958–59 British Home Championship was a football tournament played between the British Home Nations. It came the year after the notable failure of England and Scotland to impress at the 1958 FIFA World Cup, for which all four nations qualified for the only time. Wales and Northern Ireland were the only achievers, both reaching the quarter-finals after playoffs.

Many of these problems stemmed also from the deaths of a number of international players from some teams in the Munich air disaster the year before. During the Home Championship, the Ireland team took the unusual step of flying to Madrid for a friendly game against Spain between the matches against England and Scotland. The trip was, however, not a success, the Irish losing 2–6 with goals from Billy Bingham and Jimmy McIlroy.

For the second successive year, the tournament was tied between England and Ireland, as both managed a draw and a win against the other two teams in addition to the high-scoring mutual draw which began the competition. Scotland came second after comfortably beating Wales, drawing with the Irish but then narrowly losing to England in London, which cost them a share of first place. Wales recovered from their defeat to the Scots to draw with England in the second match but lost heavily to the Irish in their final game, and so finished last.

== Table ==
Team	Pld	W	D	L	GF	GA	GD	Pts
Ireland (C)	3	1	2	0	9	6	+3	4
England (C)	3	1	2	0	6	5	+1	4
Scotland	3	1	1	1	5	3	+2	3
Wales	3	0	1	2	3	9	−6	1

Rules for classification: 1) points. The points system worked as follows: 2 points for a win and 1 point for a draw.
(C) Co-champions

== Results ==
4 October 1958

Ireland	3–3	England
Cush; Peacock; Casey		Charlton; Finney

Windsor Park, Belfast

18 October 1958

Wales	0–3	Scotland
		Leggat; Law; Collins

Ninian Park, Cardiff

5 November 1958

Scotland	2–2	Ireland
Collins; Herd		McIlroy; Caldow (o.g.)

Hampden Park Glasgow

26 November 1958

England	2–2	Wales
Broadbent		Tapscott; Allchurch

Villa Park, Birmingham

22 April 1959

Ireland	4–1	Wales
McParland; Peacock; McIlroy		Tapscott

Windsor Park, Belfast

11 April 1959

England	1–0	Scotland
Charlton

Wembley Stadium, London
