= Frank Murphy (footballer, born 1915) =

Scottish footballer

Personal information
- Full name: Francis Murphy
- Date of birth: 6 December 1915
- Place of birth: Gartcosh, Scotland
- Date of death: 12 February 1984 (aged 68)
- Position: Outside left

Senior career*
| Years | Team | Apps | (Gls) |
| – | Croy Celtic | | |
| 1932–1945 | Celtic | 139 | (43) |
| 1932–1933 | → Maryhill Hibernians (loan) | | |
| 1933–1934 | → St Roch's (loan) | | |
| 1942–1943 | → Albion Rovers (wartime) | | |
| 1943 | → Tranmere Rovers (wartime) | | |
| 1944 | → Aldershot (wartime) | | |
| 1945–1946 | Limerick | | |

International career
| 1936 | Scottish Football League XI | 1 | (1) |
| 1938 | Scotland | 1 | (1) |
- * Club domestic league appearances and goals

Francis Murphy (6 December 1915 – 12 February 1984) was a Scottish footballer, who played primarily for Celtic at club level.

He represented Scotland once, in a 3–1 victory against Netherlands in May 1938, and also played for the Scottish Football League XI once in 1936, scoring on both occasions.
