= 1931–32 British Home Championship =

Tournament details
- Host country: England, Ireland, Scotland and Wales
- Dates: 19 September 1931 – 9 April 1932
- Teams: 4

Final positions
- Champions: England (23rd title)
- Runners-up: Scotland

Tournament statistics
- Matches played: 6
- Goals scored: 28 (4.67 per match)
- Top scorer: (England) Tom Waring (3)

The 1931–32 British Home Championship was a football tournament played between the British Home Nations during the 1931–32 football season. It was won by England, who succeeded in beating all three of their rivals during the course of the competition.

Scotland began the tournament with victory over Ireland in Glasgow, which was followed by a heavy English victory over Ireland in Belfast. England and Scotland, now favourites for the trophy, both played and beat Wales, England at home and Scotland in Wrexham, setting up a final decider at Wembley. In their consolation game Ireland secured third place with a strong victory over Wales who therefore lost all three of their matches. In the England/Scotland final, Scotland were outclassed by their opponents who ran out 3–0 winners to take the trophy for the third year in a row.

== Table ==
Team	Pld	W	D	L	GF	GA	GD	Pts
England (C)	3	3	0	0	12	3	+9	6
Scotland	3	2	0	1	6	6	0	4
Ireland	3	1	0	2	7	9	−2	2
Wales	3	0	0	3	3	10	−7	0

Rules for classification: 1) points. The points system worked as follows: 2 points for a win and 1 point for a draw.
(C) Champions

== Results ==
19 September 1931

Scotland	3–1	Ireland
Stevenson 5'; McGrory 34'; McPhail 75'		Dunne 21'

Ibrox Park, Glasgow
Attendance: 40,000
Referee: Isaac Caswell (England)

17 October 1931

Ireland	2–6	England
Kelly; Dunne		Waring; Houghton; Smith; Hine

Windsor Park, Belfast

31 October 1931

Wales	2–3	Scotland
Curtis 12' (pen.), 78'		Stevenson 25'; Thomson 31'; McGrory 54'

Racecourse Ground, Wrexham
Attendance: 10,860
Referee: Isaac Caswell (England)

18 November 1931

England	3–1	Wales
Smith; Crooks; Hine

Anfield, Liverpool

5 December 1931

Ireland	4–0	Wales
Kelly; Millar; Bambrick

Windsor Park, Belfast

9 April 1932

England	3–0	Scotland
Waring 36'; Barclay 80'; Crooks 88'

Wembley Stadium, London
Attendance: 92,180
Referee: Samuel Thompson (Ireland)
