= Sandy Griffiths =

Welsh football referee (1909–1974)

Mervyn Griffiths
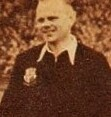
- Full name: Benjamin Mervyn Griffiths
- Born: 17 January 1909; Abertillery, Monmouthshire, Wales
- Died: 21 January 1974 (aged 65); Wales

Domestic
Years	League	Role
1939 (WW2)	Football League	Linesman
1945–1959	Football League	Referee

International
Years	League	Role
1949–1958	FIFA listed	Referee

Benjamin Mervyn "Sandy" Griffiths (17 January 1909 – 21 January 1974) was a Welsh football referee from Abertillery, Monmouthshire.

== Career ==
Griffiths initially took up a teaching post in Devon but soon returned to Newport and began his refereeing career in 1934 in local leagues. Within five seasons he was appointed to the Football League list as a linesman and, after the War, refereed the England versus Scotland clash in 1949, and then the 1953 FA Cup Final, otherwise known as the Matthews Final. It was his decision, with two minutes remaining, that enabled Stan Mortensen to equalise from a free-kick awarded just outside the penalty area.

Griffiths represented Wales at the 1950, 1954 and 1958 World Cup Finals. In the first of these he appeared in the opening fixture, and in the second took charge of the semi-final between Hungary and Uruguay, and assisting William Ling in the final. In the closing minutes of the match, and with the score at 3–2 to the West Germans, Griffiths flagged Hungary's Ferenc Puskás offside, just as he beat Toni Turek in the German goal.

He was the first Welshman to referee an international at Wembley, the first from his country to referee an FA Cup Final, and the only Welshman to appear in a World Cup final.

Preceded by Arthur Ellis	FA Cup Final Referee; 1953	Succeeded by A Luty
