= Dudley Milligan =

Association football player (1916–1971)

Personal information
- Full name: Dudley James Milligan
- Date of birth: 7 November 1916
- Place of birth: Johannesburg, South Africa
- Date of death: 1971 (aged 54–55)
- Place of death: South Africa
- Height: 5 ft 10 in (1.78 m)
- Position: Forward

Senior career*
| Years | Team | Apps | (Gls) |
- Johannesburg Rangers
| 1937–1938 | Clyde | 10 | (9) |
| 1938–1947 | Chesterfield | 47 | (18) |
- → Linfield (war guest)
- → Larne (war guest)
| 1942 | → Distillery (war guest) | | |
| 1942 | → Dundalk (war guest) | | |
| 1947–1948 | Bournemouth & Boscombe Athletic | 45 | (25) |
| 1948–1949 | Walsall | 5 | (1) |
| 1949 | Ballymena United | | |
| Total | | 107 | (53) |

International career
| 1936 | South Africa | 3 | (0) |
| 1939 | Ireland | 1 | (1) |
- * Club domestic league appearances and goals

Dudley James Milligan (7 January 1916 – 1971) was a footballer who represented both South Africa and Ireland at international level. Milligan, who played as a forward, played professionally in Scotland, England, and Ireland between 1937 and 1949.

== Club career ==
Born in Johannesburg, Dudley began his career with hometown side Johannesburg Rangers before going on trial with Scottish club Dundee in 1937. He then played professionally for Clyde and Chesterfield; during World War II, normal League football was suspended, and Milligan guested for a number of teams in Ireland including Linfield, Larne, Distillery and Dundalk. After the League resumed in 1946, Milligan returned to Chesterfield, before moving to Bournemouth & Boscombe Athletic in August 1947. By October 1948 Milligan had moved to Walsall, and in 1949 he returned to Ireland to play with Ballymena United.

== International career ==
Milligan played international football for both South Africa and Ireland.
