= 1954–55 British Home Championship =

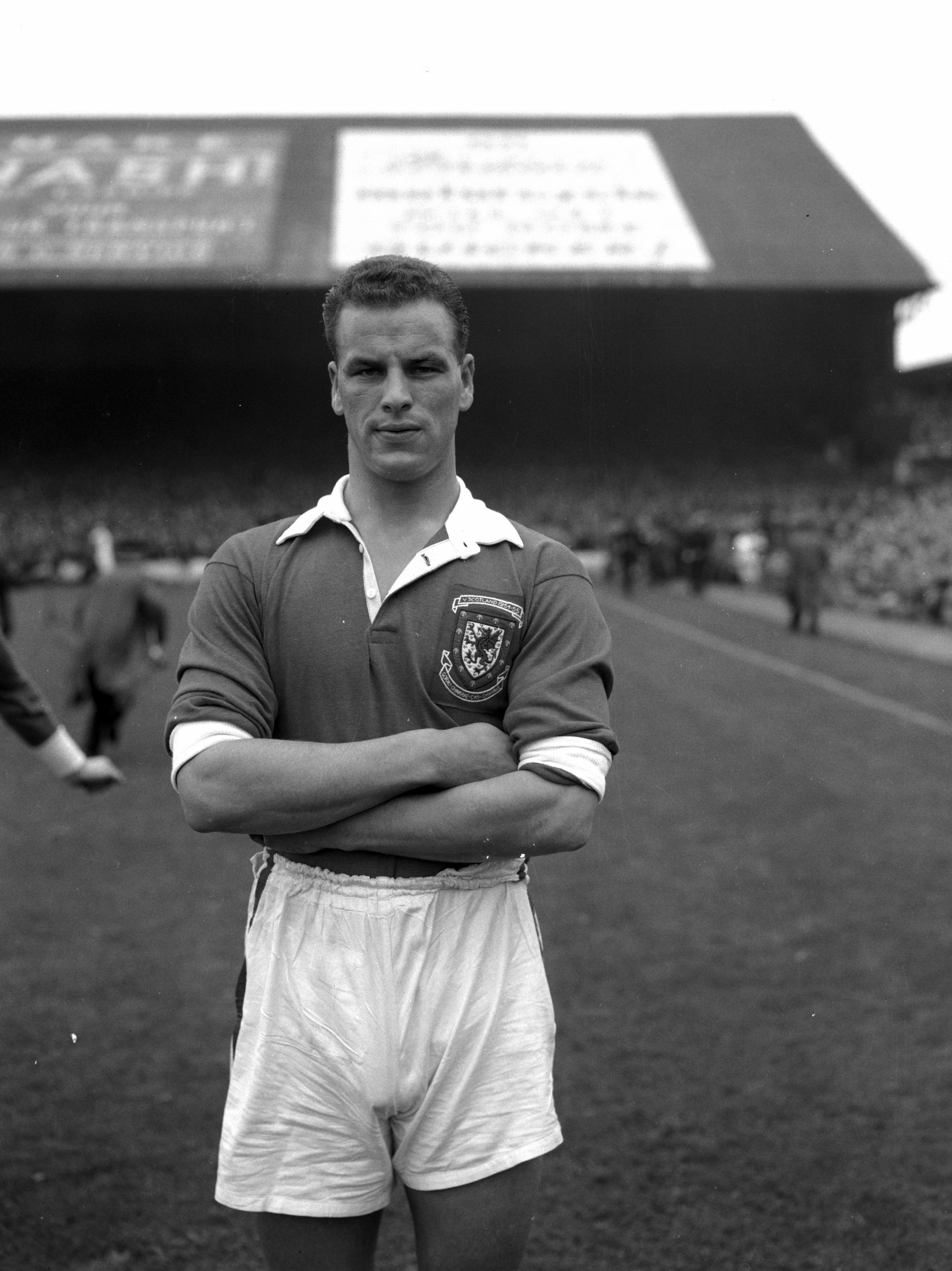
- John Charles at the Wales–Scotland tie, Ninian Park, 16 October 1954.

Tournament details
- Host country: England, Ireland, Scotland and Wales
- Dates: 2 October 1954 – 20 April 1955
- Teams: 4

Final positions
- Champions: England
- Runners-up: Scotland

Tournament statistics
- Matches played: 6
- Goals scored: 26 (4.33 per match)
- Top scorer: (Wales) John Charles (5)

The 1954–55 British Home Championship was a football tournament played between the British Home Nations during the 1954–55 football season. It was won by a strong England side which included players such as Johnny Haynes and Nat Lofthouse as well as future manager Don Revie. England and Scotland, had competed at the 1954 FIFA World Cup in the summer before the tournament began and both teams had struggled, eventually being knocked out by Uruguay, Scotland by a 7–0 margin.

England began the tournament as favourites and proved their status with a simple victory over Ireland in their first match. Scotland matched this with a difficult win over Wales in their match, although only by one goal to nil. Both Wales and Ireland improved in their second matches, the Irish holding Scotland to a 2–2 draw whilst the Welsh almost achieved the same against England in London, eventually losing 3–2. The final games were played at the conclusion of the domestic season, and saw Ireland fall to the Welsh under their inspirational goalscorer John Charles, who netted a hat trick in a 3–2 victory. England had by this time taken the championship with a comprehensive demolition of Scotland 7–2 in their final match, Dennis Wilshaw claiming four of the goals.

== Table ==
Team	Pld	W	D	L	GF	GA	GD	Pts
England (C)	3	3	0	0	12	4	+8	6
Scotland	3	1	1	1	5	9	−4	3
Wales	3	1	0	2	5	6	−1	2
Ireland	3	0	1	2	4	7	−3	1

Rules for classification: 1) points. The points system worked as follows: 2 points for a win and 1 point for a draw.
(C) Champions

== Results ==
2 October 1954

Ireland	0–2	England
		Johnny Haynes; Don Revie

Windsor Park, Belfast

16 October 1954

Wales	0–1	Scotland
		Paddy Buckley

Ninian Park, Cardiff

3 November 1954

Scotland	2–2	Ireland
Jimmy Davidson; Bobby Johnstone		Billy Bingham; Billy McAdams

Hampden Park, Glasgow

10 November 1954

England	3–2	Wales
Roy Bentley 3		John Charles 2

Wembley Stadium, London

2 April 1955

England	7–2	Scotland
Dennis Wilshaw 4 Nat Lofthouse 2 Don Revie	Report (Page 4)	Lawrie Reilly; Tommy Docherty

Wembley Stadium, London

20 April 1955

Ireland	2–3	Wales
Eddie Crossan; Jimmy Walker		John Charles 3

Windsor Park, Belfast
