= Tommy Lawton =

English association footballer (1919–1996)

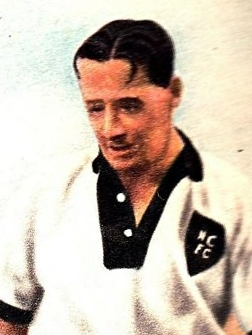
- Lawton circa 1951

Personal information
- Full name: Thomas Lawton
- Date of birth: 6 October 1919
- Place of birth: Farnworth, England
- Date of death: 6 November 1996 (aged 77)
- Place of death: Nottingham, England
- Height: 5 ft 11 in (1.80 m)
- Position: Centre-forward

Youth career
- 1933: Rossendale United
- 1933–1936: Burnley

Senior career*
Years	Team	Apps	(Gls)
1936–1937	Burnley	25	(16)
1937–1945	Everton	87	(65)
1945–1947	Chelsea	42	(30)
1947–1952	Notts County	151	(90)
1952–1953	Brentford	50	(17)
1953–1955	Arsenal	35	(13)
1955–1956	Kettering Town	30	(15)
Total		420	(246)

International career
1939–19??	The Football League XI	3	(2)
1938–1948	England	23	(22)
1939–1946	→ England (wartime)	23	(24)
1947	United Kingdom	1	(2)

Managerial career
- 1953: Brentford (player-manager)
- 1956–1957: Kettering Town (player-manager)
- 1957–1958: Notts County
- 1963–1964: Kettering Town (caretaker-manager)
- * Club domestic league appearances and goals

Thomas Lawton (6 October 1919 – 6 November 1996) was an English football player and manager.

Born in Farnworth and raised in Bolton, he played amateur football at Rossendale United, before he turned professional at Burnley on his 17th birthday. He also played cricket for Burnley Cricket Club before his potential as a footballer won him a £6,500 move to Everton in January 1937. He went on to finish as the First Division's top-scorer in 1938 and 1939, helping Everton to finish as champions of the Football League in the latter campaign. League football was then suspended for seven full seasons due to the outbreak of World War II, during which time he scored 24 goals in 23 appearances for England whilst guesting for Everton and some other clubs. In November 1945, he moved to Chelsea for £14,000 and scored a club-record 26 goals in 34 league games in the 1946–47 season.

In November 1947, he made a surprise move to Third Division South club Notts County for a British record transfer fee of £20,000. He helped the club to win promotion as champions in 1949–50 before he moved on to Brentford in March 1952 for a club record £16,000. In January 1953, Brentford appointed him player-manager, though he would only remain in charge for nine months. He joined Arsenal as a player in November 1953 for £10,000, where he saw out the remainder of his playing career. Despite losing much of his best years to the war, he scored 260 goals in 433 league and cup competitions in 14 full seasons in the Football League.

He had a promising start to his managerial career by leading Kettering Town to the Southern League title in 1956–57, but then only had two more seasons as manager, getting relegated with Notts County in 1957–58 and then relegated with Kettering Town in 1963–64. During the 1970s, he struggled with debt and related legal problems, which were reported in the media as an example of a celebrated person falling from grace.

He scored 22 goals in his 23 England appearances over a ten-year international career from 1938 to 1948, including four against Portugal in May 1947. He helped England to win two British Home Championship titles outright (1946–47 and 1947–48) and to share the Championship in 1938–39. He fell out of international contention at the age of 28 due to his contempt for manager Walter Winterbottom, his decision to drop out of the First Division, and the emergence of Jackie Milburn and Nat Lofthouse. In addition to his England caps, he also represented The Football League XI and played in a special Great Britain game against Europe in 1947. He married twice and had two children and one step-child. His ashes are held in the National Football Museum, and he was inducted into the English Football Hall of Fame in 2003.

== Early life ==
Thomas Lawton was born on 6 October 1919 to Elizabeth Riley and Thomas Lawton Senior in Farnworth, Lancashire. His father was a railway signalman, and his mother worked as a weaver at Harrowby Mill. His father left the family 18 months after Lawton was born, and Elizabeth moved back into her parents' home in Bolton. Elizabeth's father, James Hugh "Jim" Riley, became Lawton's surrogate father. Lawton's natural footballing ability earned him a place on the Bolton Town Schools team in 1930. Lancashire Schools picked him at the age of 13. Despite scoring a hat-trick in a trial game for England Schoolboys, he never earned a full England Schoolboy cap. At the age of 14, he began playing for Hayes Athletic in the Bolton Senior League and went on to score 570 goals in three seasons.

The FA's rules meant he was unable to turn professional at a club until he was 17, and Lawton's grandfather rejected Bolton Wanderers's offer for Lawton to work as a delivery driver for two years before turning professional at the club. Lawton instead played as an amateur for Rossendale United in the Lancashire Combination, scoring a hat-trick on his debut against Bacup. He took up temporary work at a tannery and then joined Burnley as assistant groundsman after his mother rejected an offer from Sheffield Wednesday as she objected to him travelling to Sheffield daily.

== Club career ==
=== Burnley ===
Lawton played his first game for Burnley Reserves against Manchester City Reserves in September 1935. Though he struggled in this game, he became a regular Reserve team player by age 16. After a poor run of form from Cecil Smith, Lawton was selected ahead of Smith for the Second Division game against Doncaster Rovers at Turf Moor on 28 March 1936; aged 16 years and 174 days, this made him the youngest centre-forward ever to play in the Football League. Rovers centre-half Syd Bycroft, also making his league debut, marked Lawton out of the game, which ended in a 1–1 draw. Burnley had played poorly, though Lawton was praised for his "keen and fearless" performance by the Express & News newspaper. He retained his place for the following game, and scored two goals in a 3–1 victory over Swansea Town at Vetch Field. He picked up a groin strain in his third appearance, which caused him to miss two fixtures before he returned to the first team for the final four games of the 1935–36 season; he claimed three more goals to take his season tally to five goals from seven games.

Lawton continued to train his heading skills intensely in the summer of 1936 and also played cricket for Burnley Cricket Club as a batsman in the Lancashire League. He scored a six against both Learie Constantine and Amar Singh. He scored 369 runs in 15 completed innings for an average of 24.06.

He turned professional at Burnley at 17 on wages of £7 a week. His grandfather attempted to negotiate a £500 signing-on fee on his behalf but was rebuffed after the club alerted Charles Sutcliffe, Secretary of the Football League, who informed them that any attempt to circumvent the league's maximum wage was illegal. Lawton scored in his first appearance since signing the contract after just 30 seconds before going on to record a hat-trick in a 3–1 win over Tottenham Hotspur, scoring a goal with either foot and one with his head.

=== Everton ===
In January 1937, First Division club Everton paid Burnley £6,500 to secure Lawton's services and also gave his grandfather a job as deputy groundsman at Goodison Park; the fee was a record for a player under 21. The move to Everton made him a teammate of Dixie Dean, his boyhood idol, who he was expected to gradually replace as first-choice centre-forward. He later recalled that on his way to Goodison Park on his first day as an Everton player, he was told by a tram conductor that "You're that young Lawton, aren't you? You'll never be as good as Dixie." Dean was finally rested on 13 February, which allowed Lawton to make his first team debut against Wolverhampton Wanderers at Molineux; the match ended in a 6–2 defeat, though Lawton scored a penalty. He spent the rest of the season at inside-left, with Dean at centre-forward, and ended the 1936–37 campaign with four goals in 11 games. He started the 1937–38 season in the Reserves. He was installed as first choice centre-forward in September after Dean was dropped for punching club secretary Theo Kelly. On 2 October, Lawton scored the winning penalty in a 2–1 victory over Merseyside derby rivals Liverpool at Anfield. He ended the campaign with 28 goals in 39 appearances to become the division's top-scorer.

Everton had a young but highly effective team for the 1938–39 campaign, and Lawton was praised for the way he led the attack, with the Evening Standard's Roland Allen describing Lawton as a "clever footballer, bringing his wing men into the game with shrewd flicks and widely flung and accurate passes" after Everton recorded a 2–1 victory over Arsenal at Highbury. The game against Arsenal was part of a run of six wins in the first six games of the campaign, during which time Lawton scored eight goals. Everton lost their lead at the top of the table to Derby County over Christmas, but returned to form and to first position by Easter. They faced a difficult final run of games, but beat Chelsea and recorded two victories over Sunderland to secure the club's fifth league title, finishing four points ahead of second-place Wolverhampton Wanderers. Lawton scored 35 goals in 38 league games to finish as the division's top-scorer for the second successive season. However, in the summer he wrote to Leicester City to request that the club buy him from Everton; it was reported that he reached out to Leicester as they were managed by Tom Bromilow, his former Burnley manager. Everton were fifth in the league and Lawton was the division's top-scorer with four goals when league football was suspended three games into the 1939–40 season due to the outbreak of World War II. Lawton later remarked that "I'm convinced that if it hadn't been for the War, we'd have won the Championship again, the average age of those players was about 24 or 25".

=== World War II ===
Lawton continued to play for both Everton and England during the war. However, the FA decided not to award full caps for England appearances during the war. As a result, his 24 goals in 23 international games were not counted in statistics for the official England team. As was common for footballers during the war, he also made guest appearances for several clubs besides Everton, including Leicester City, Greenock Morton, Chester City, Aldershot, and Tranmere Rovers. He was called up to the British Army in January 1940, and his status as an England international saw him recruited to the Army Physical Training Corps. He also played for the British Army team and his Area Command team. He was posted in Birkenhead, which allowed him to appear for Everton frequently.

On Christmas Day 1940, he played for Everton against Liverpool at Anfield in the morning and Tranmere Rovers at Crewe Alexandra in the afternoon. Explaining this later, he said, 'The Tranmere people came into the dressing room and asked if anyone wanted to play as they were two men short. I said, "Go on, I'll help you out." And I did.' In 1942, he scored a hat-trick for England in a 5–4 win over Scotland at Hampden Park. Later in the year, he scored six goals for Aldershot in a 9–0 win over Luton Town. On 16 October 1943, he scored four goals in an 8–0 victory over Scotland at Maine Road.

=== Chelsea ===
In July 1945, Lawton handed in a transfer request at Everton as he wanted a move to a Southern club to see more of his increasingly estranged wife. In November 1945, he was sold to Chelsea for a fee of £14,000. Chelsea continued to play regional wartime fixtures as national league football had not resumed for the 1945–46 season, and Lawton also continued his uncapped appearances for the England national team. In the summer of 1946, following his demobilisation, he coached for the FA in a summer camp in Switzerland. He scored a club record 26 goals in 34 league games in the 1946–47 season. However, he struggled to settle at Stamford Bridge. He came into conflict with manager Billy Birrell after refusing to go on a pre-season tour of Sweden in 1947, which resulted in him requesting a transfer. He favoured a move to Arsenal, but the Chelsea hierarchy ruled this out. Lawton turned down an approach by Sunderland manager Bill Murray as he held out hope that Chelsea would relent and allow him a move to Arsenal.

=== Notts County ===
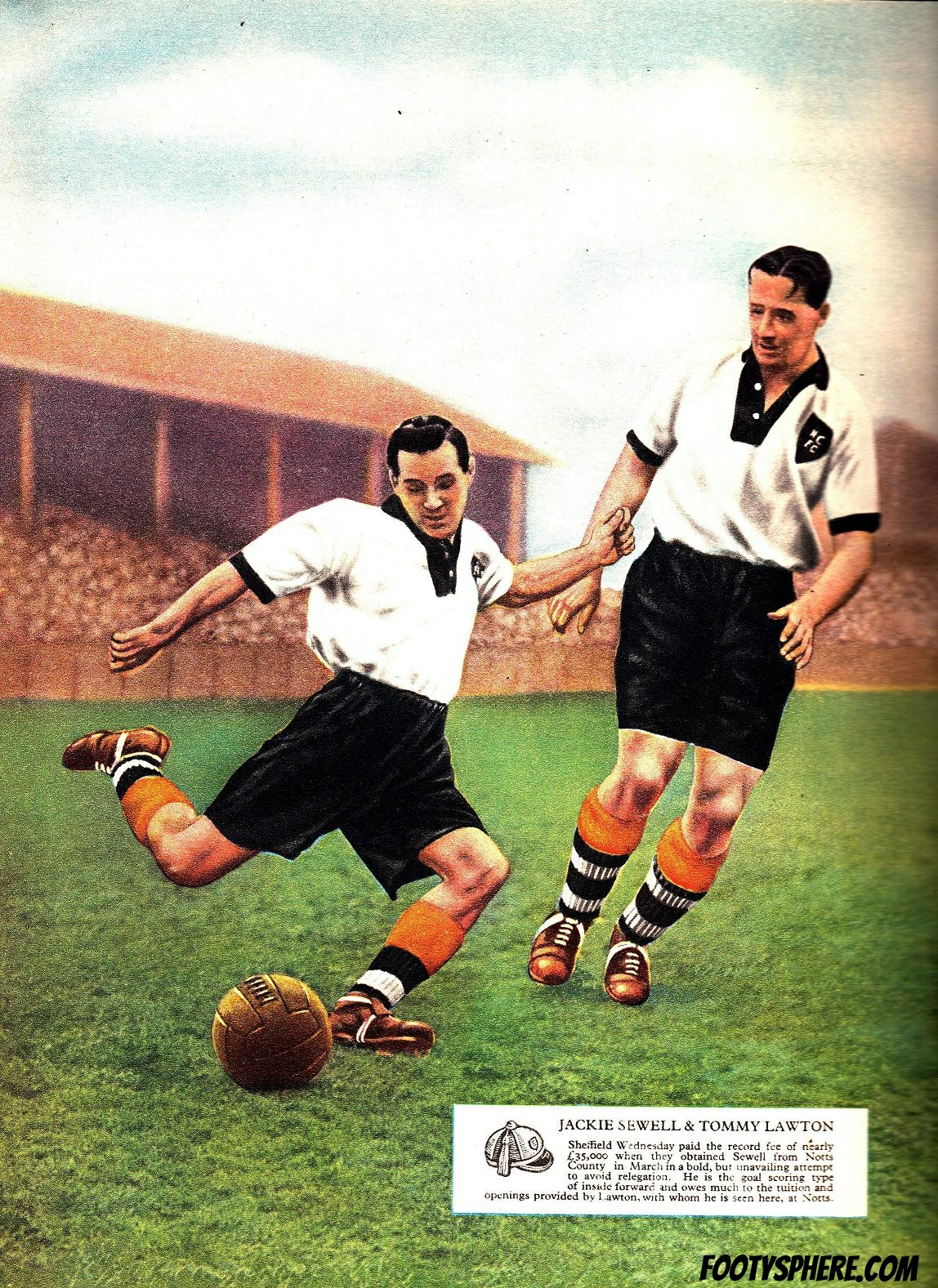
Jackie Sewell and Tommy Lawton

In November 1947, Lawton was sold to Notts County of the Third Division South for a British record transfer fee of £20,000 (equivalent to £676,600 in 2025). He made the surprise decision to drop down two divisions to be reunited with manager Arthur Stollery, his former masseur and friend at Chelsea, and because he was promised a job outside of football upon his retirement by vice-chairman Harold Walmsley. Walmsley told the Nottingham Guardian Journal that "we are prepared to spend to the limit to put this old club back where it belongs". He scored two goals on his home debut, a 4–2 win over Bristol Rovers in front of 38,000 spectators at Meadow Lane – a huge increase on previous home games of typically 6,000 to 7,000 supporters. He ended the 1947–48 season with 24 goals in as many games, though he was resented by the club's directors after he insisted on pay rises for his teammates and stopped the practice of director's friends and family travelling to away games on the team coach.

He formed a productive forward partnership with Jackie Sewell in the 1948–49 campaign and scored 23 goals in 40 league and cup appearances. County finished in mid-table despite scoring 102 goals, 15 more than champions Swansea. Stollery was sacked, and upon Lawton's suggestion, the club appointed Eric Houghton as manager after Lawton turned down the role as player-manager. Lawton and Sewell's understanding grew throughout the 1949–50 campaign, and Lawton finished as the division's top-scorer with 31 goals in 37 league games as County won promotion as champions, seven points ahead of second-placed Northampton Town. Promotion was secured with a 2–0 win over local rivals Nottingham Forest at Meadow Lane on 22 April.

However, he struggled with poor form during the 1950–51 season as his first marriage ended, and he came into increasing conflict with his teammates. He was angered when the club sold Jackie Sewell to Sheffield Wednesday in March 1951 – breaking Lawton's own transfer record in the process – as he felt the move showed a lack of ambition from the club's directors. He also found that the well-paid job he was promised outside of football did not transpire. His tally of nine goals in 31 games in 1950–51 and 13 goals in 31 games in 1951–52 was disappointing, and he was made available for transfer. He voluntarily relinquished the captaincy to teammate Leon Leuty in November 1951, expressing that he no longer wanted the responsibility.

=== Brentford ===
In March 1952, Lawton joined Second Division side Brentford for a club record £16,000 fee. Manager Jackie Gibbons left the club at the start of the 1952–53 season and was succeeded by his assistant Jimmy Bain, who proved ill-suited to management, and so in January 1953 Lawton was appointed as player-manager, with Bain as his assistant. However he lost the dressing room due to his excessive demands of the players, and the strains of management were hurting his form. Brentford also lost their best players having sold both Ron Greenwood and Jimmy Hill. Lawton signed two veterans in former Notts County teammate Frank Broome and Ian McPherson to play on the wings, who, with Lawton, formed an attacking trio with a combined age of 104. Brentford got off to a poor start to the 1953–54 season, and Lawton resigned as manager after the Griffin Park crowd began to mock the forward line by singing Dear Old Pals.

=== Arsenal ===
In November 1953, Lawton was traded to First Division champions Arsenal for £7,500 plus James Robertson who was valued at £2,500. He was signed by manager Tom Whittaker, who had previously found success in bringing in veterans such as Ronnie Rooke and Joe Mercer. However Lawton was limited to ten appearances in the 1953–54 campaign after picking up an injury on his debut. He also played in the 1953 Charity Shield, scoring one goal as Arsenal beat Blackpool 3–1. He scored seven goals in 20 appearances throughout the 1954–55 season, including winning goals against Chelsea and Cardiff City. He scored a hat-trick past Cardiff City on the opening day of the 1955–56 season, before he announced his decision to leave Arsenal to pursue a career in management eight games into the campaign.

"More than 20 years of soccer. What glorious years. Years that all the money in the world couldn't buy. I have been lucky. I have played with great clubs; I have escaped serious injury; I have played for my country; I have even captained my country; I have won many of the game's top honours. Soccer has been good to me and I hope that I have repaid the game in some small way. I have had great experiences. I have met some wonderful people. I have memories that nobody can take away from me. If I could turn the clock back 20 years, I would still go into the game as a full-time professional and I can say to any lad who is contemplating a career in football: Go ahead son ... providing you are willing to work and work hard and providing you are willing to learn the craft thoroughly. You will meet some of the grandest fellows you could ever wish to meet and you will have a pleasant, healthy life and be quite well paid for it.

— Lawton reflected on his career in his book My Twenty Years of Soccer.

== International career ==
Lawton was called up to play for The Football League XI against a League of Ireland XI at Windsor Park on 21 September 1938, and scored four goals in what finished as an 8–2 win. A month later he went on to win his first cap for England on 22 October, England's first game of the 1938–39 British Home Championship, a 4–2 defeat to Wales at Ninian Park, and converted a penalty kick to mark his first England appearance with a goal. This made him the youngest player to score on his England debut, a record which lasted until Marcus Rashford broke it in 2016. Four days after Lawton's debut, he scored again for England at Highbury in a 3–0 win over 'The Rest of Europe', a team of players selected from Italy, Germany, France, Belgium, Hungary and Norway. Later in the year he also scored in victories over Norway and Ireland. He played in all four games of 1939, scoring against Scotland and Italy; the goal against Scotland secured a 2–1 win in front of 149,269 spectators at Hampden Park.

Newly appointed England manager Walter Winterbottom played Lawton in England's first official match in seven years on 28 September 1946, a 7–2 win over Ireland. He played the remaining three fixtures of 1946 and scored four goals in an 8–2 victory over the Netherlands at Leeds Road on 27 November. On 10 May 1947, he scored two goals playing for the Great Britain XI in a 6–1 victory over a Rest of Europe XI that was billed as the 'Match of the Century'. Five days later he scored four goals in a 10–0 victory over Portugal at Lisbon's Estádio Nacional. On 21 September, he scored after just 12 seconds in a 5–2 win over Belgium at Heysel Stadium.

He retained his place in the England team following his club move to Notts County, and in doing so, became the first Third Division footballer to represent England when he scored from the penalty spot in a 4–2 win over Sweden on 19 November. However, he only won three further caps in 1948, his final appearance coming in a 0–0 draw with Denmark in Copenhagen on 26 September. He had become increasingly disillusioned with the England set-up, and told Winterbottom that "if you think you can teach Stanley Matthews to play on the wing and me how to score goals, you've got another think coming!" Winterbottom was also frustrated by Lawton's smoking habit and preferred Jackie Milburn ahead of Lawton. Hopes of any future comeback were ended by the emergence of powerful centre-forward Nat Lofthouse, who made his England debut in November 1950.

== Style of play ==
Lawton was widely regarded as the finest centre-forward of his generation. He boasted a strong physique and good ball control skills, as well as a great passing range and a powerful shot. He was naturally right-footed, though worked to improve his left foot to a good enough standard to be considered a two-footed player. His greatest strength though was his ability to head the ball with power and accuracy, as he possessed muscular legs to give himself a strong jump and long hang-time, and was also able to time his jumps to perfection. Stanley Matthews surmised that "Quite simply, Tommy was the greatest header of the ball I ever saw." Lawton was never booked throughout his career.

== Coaching career and later life ==
An Arsenal director helped Lawton to secure the position of player-manager at Southern League side Kettering Town. He took up the role at the club on wages of £1,500 a year in the summer of 1956. At the helm he thereafter signed several footballers such as Jim Standen of Arsenal, Amos Moss of Aston Villa, Jack Wheeler who played for Huddersfield Town and Brentford's Jack Goodwin. He was also successful in bringing to Kettering Fulham's Bob Thomas, Harry McDonald who was previously with Crystal Palace and Sunderland's Geoff Toseland. During his debut season as manager, 1956–1957, Kettering found themselves ten points clear at the top of the table by Christmas. As a result of this success, in January 1956, he turned down an approach from Notts County. Lawton then went on to foster Kettering towards their winning of the league title in 1956–57 by eight points. Out of Kettering's 106 league goals, Lawton scored 15.

He was appointed Notts County manager in May 1957, controversially replacing caretaker-manager Frank Broome. Broome, who had steered the club away from being relegated from the Second Division, was installed as his assistant manager. He found it tedious making new signings due to financial constraints on the part of the club. He did though take on forwards Jeff Astle and Tony Hateley as apprentices, who would both go on to have long careers in the First Division. Lawton agreed to go without his wages for six months to improve the club's finances. County were, however, relegated at the end of the 1957–58 season, finishing one point short of safety, and Lawton was sacked. He received a total of just three months' pay for his time at the club, having only a verbal offer of a three-year contract to fall back on and nothing in writing.

After being sacked as Notts County manager, Lawton ran the Magna Charta public house in Lowdham from October 1958. An employee stole £2,500 from the business, and Lawton decided to leave the pub trade after four years. He then took up a job selling insurance. He returned to football management with Kettering Town for the 1963–64 season as a caretaker following the resignation of Wally Akers. The season ended with Kettering being relegated from the Southern League Premier Division. He was offered the job permanently, but turned it down to concentrate on his job as an insurance salesman. He lost his job in insurance in 1967 and then opened a sporting goods shop that bore his name after going into partnership with a friend, but was forced to close the business after just two months due to poor sales. After a period on unemployment benefits he found work at a betting company in Nottingham.

He returned to Notts County as a coach and chief scout from 1968 to 1970. He was sacked after new manager Jimmy Sirrel decided to appoint his own backroom staff, and Lawton returned to unemployment. In May 1970, he wrote to Chelsea chairman Richard Attenborough asking for a loan of £250 and possible employment; Attenborough lent him £100. He was interviewed by Eamonn Andrews on ITV's Today programme on his fall from England star to the unemployment line. After his financial troubles became public knowledge, a large furnishing company offered him a lucrative job as director of his own subsidiary furniture company on Tottenham Court Road; however the company went into liquidation the following year. He continued to write cheques in the company's name, and in June 1972, pleaded guilty to seven charges of obtaining goods and cash by deception. He was sentenced to three years probation, and ordered to pay £240 compensation and £100 in costs.

In 1972, a testimonial match was organised by Everton on Lawton's behalf to help him pay off his debts of around £6,000. However his financial situation was still bleak, and on two occasions he narrowly avoided a prison sentence for failing to pay his rates after an Arsenal supporters club and later an anonymous former co-worker stepped in to pay the bill for him. In August 1974, he was again found guilty of obtaining goods by deception after failing to repay a £10 debt to a publican. He was sentenced to 200 hours of Community service and ordered to pay £40 costs. In 1984, he began writing a column for the Nottingham Evening Post. Brentford also organised a testimonial match for him in May 1985.

Lawton's health deteriorated in his old age, and he died in November 1996, aged 77, as a result of pneumonia. His ashes were donated to the National Football Museum. He was inducted into the English Football Hall of Fame in 2003.

== Personal life ==
Lawton married Rosaleen May Kavanagh in January 1941; the marriage bore one child, Amanda. Divorce was granted with a decree nisi in March 1951 after Rosaleen was found to have committed adultery with Notts County director Adrian Van Geffen; Lawton never saw Amanda again and was not required to pay child support. Lawton married second wife Gladys Rose in September 1952, who bore him a son, Thomas Junior. Gladys was also divorced, and her ex-husband cited Lawton as a co-respondent in the divorce proceedings as the pair had begun their relationship whilst Gladys was still married; her family were staunch Catholics, and her family ostracised Gladys following her divorce. Gladys had a daughter, Carol, from her previous marriage, who Lawton raised as his own. Thomas Junior went on to play rugby union for Leicester Tigers.

He starred alongside Thora Hird and Diana Dors in the 1953 film The Great Game, playing himself in a cameo role. Throughout the 1950s he went on to appear on What's My Line? amongst other radio and television programmes. He published a total of five books: Football is My Business (1946),Tommy Lawton's all star football book (1950), Soccer the Lawton way (1954), My Twenty Years of Soccer (1955), and When the Cheering Stopped (1973).

== Career statistics ==
=== Club ===
Appearances and goals by club, season and competition
Club	Season	League			National cup (Note: Includes FA Cup, League War Cup)		Other		Total	
Club	Season	Division	Apps	Goals	Apps	Goals	Apps	Goals	Apps	Goals
Burnley	1935–36	Second Division	7	5	0	0	0	0	7	5
Burnley	1936–37	Second Division	18	11	0	0	0	0	18	11
Burnley	Total		25	16	0	0	0	0	25	16
Everton	1936–37	First Division	10	3	1	1	0	0	11	4
Everton	1937–38	First Division	39	28	2	0	0	0	41	28
Everton	1938–39	First Division	38	34	5	4	0	0	43	38
Everton	1939–40	War League Western Division	14	12	6	6	3 (Note: Three appearances and four goals in the league before the season was abandoned due to World War II and so are not included in the league totals column.)	4	23	22
Everton	1940–41	War League Western Division	17	22	4	8	0	0	21	30
Everton	1941–42	War League Western Division	11	14	6	4	0	0	17	18
Everton	1942–43	War League Western Division	12	15	5	8	0	0	17	23
Everton	1943–44	War League Western Division	24	40	8	16	0	0	32	56
Everton	1944–45	War League Western Division	17	28	6	10	0	0	23	38
Everton	Total		182	176	43	57	3	4	228	240
Chelsea	1945–46	First Division	0	0	6	1	0	0	6	1
Chelsea	1946–47	First Division	34	26	5	4	0	0	39	30
Chelsea	1947–48	First Division	8	4	0	0	0	0	8	4
Chelsea	Total		42	30	11	5	0	0	53	35
Notts County	1947–48	Third Division South	19	18	5	6	0	0	24	24
Notts County	1948–49	Third Division South	36	20	4	3	0	0	40	23
Notts County	1949–50	Third Division South	37	31	3	2	0	0	40	33
Notts County	1950–51	Second Division	30	9	1	0	0	0	31	9
Notts County	1951–52	Second Division	29	12	2	2	0	0	31	13
Notts County	Total		151	90	15	13	0	0	166	103
Brentford	1951–52	Second Division	10	2	0	0	0	0	10	2
Brentford	1952–53	Second Division	34	13	3	0	0	0	37	13
Brentford	1953–54	Second Division	6	2	0	0	0	0	6	2
Brentford	Total		50	17	3	0	0	0	53	17
Arsenal	1953–54	First Division	9	1	0	0	1 (Note: Appearance in the Charity Shield.)	1	10	2
Arsenal	1954–55	First Division	18	6	2	1	0	0	20	7
Arsenal	1955–56	First Division	8	6	0	0	0	0	8	6
Arsenal	Total		35	13	2	1	1	1	38	15
Career total			471	350	68	70	4	5	543	425

=== International ===
Appearances and goals by national team and year
National team	Year	Apps	Goals
England	1938	4	4
England	1939	4	2
England	1946	4	6
England	1947	8	9
England	1948	3	1
Total		23	22

== Managerial statistics ==
Managerial record by team and tenure
Team	From	To	Record				
Team	From	To	P	W	D	L	Win %
Brentford	2 January 1953	7 September 1953	28	8	9	11	28.6
Notts County	7 May 1957	1 July 1958	44	13	6	25	29.5
Total			72	21	15	36	29.2

== Honours ==
=== Player ===
Everton

- Football League First Division: 1938–39

Notts County

- Football League Third Division South: 1949–50

Arsenal

- Charity Shield: 1953

England

- British Home Championship: 1938–39 (shared), 1946–47, 1947–48

=== Managerial ===
Kettering Town

- Southern Football League: 1956–57

=== Individual ===
- First Division top scorer: 1937–38, 1938–39
- Third Division South top scorer: 1949–50
- English Football Hall of Fame: 2003
- Notts County FC Hall of Fame: 2014

== See also ==
- List of men's footballers with 500 or more goals
