= Jimmy Kelly (footballer, born 1911) =

Irish footballer

Personal information
- Date of birth: 1911
- Place of birth: Ballybofey, County Donegal, Ireland
- Position: Outside left

Youth career
- Stranorlar School
- Long Tower Boys School
- Foyle Stars
- St. Columb's Court
- Newry Town
- Fulton Rovers

Senior career*
Years	Team	Apps	(Gls)
192x–1928	Coleraine		
1928–1930	Liverpool	0	(0)
- → Liverpool Reserves
1930–1946	Derry City		
1942	→ Shamrock Rovers (loan)	5	(5)
1946–1947	Dundalk	10	(6)
1947–1951	Derry City	?	(23)
1951–1952	Coleraine	?	(5)
1952	Ballymena United	?	(0)
1952–19xx	Ballymoney United		

International career
1931–1936	Ireland (IFA)	11	(4)
1932–1936	Irish Free State (FAI)	5	(2)
1931–1948	Irish League XI	23	(7)
1947	League of Ireland XI	3	(0)
- * Club domestic league appearances and goals

Jimmy Kelly (1911 – November 1970) was an Irish footballer who played for, among others, Derry City, Shamrock Rovers and Dundalk. Kelly was one of the most prolific goalscorers ever to play in the (Northern) Irish League, scoring 748 goals in the league between 1928 and 1952. He also scored 12 goals during his time in the (Southern) League of Ireland and scored a further 193 in other competitions. Kelly was noted for having a powerful left footed shot.

Kelly was a dual international and played for both Ireland teams – the IFA XI and the FAI XI. In 1932 he became the first (Northern) Irish League player to play for an FAI XI and in 1934 was a member of their first team to play in a World Cup qualifier. In 1936 Kelly actually played for both the IFA XI and the FAI XI within the same week and finished on the winning team on both occasions.

Including selection and reserve teams, he has made over 1,000 appearances in his career.

== Club career ==
=== Early years ===
As a youth Kelly played for several teams in the Derry and District League and also turned out for Newry Town. He then began his senior career with Coleraine before being signed by Liverpool in May 1928. However, he failed to make any senior appearances for the Reds and after over two years at the club, a disillusioned Kelly signed for Derry City for a fee of £100 in October 1930.

=== Derry City ===
Kelly made his debut for Derry City on 26 October 1930 against Linfield at Windsor Park. However it took him four matches to score his first goal for the club in a game against Glenavon. This was the first of 363 goals he would score for City. Among these goals was one in a 2–1 defeat against Linfield in the 1936 Irish Cup final. This was the club's first major final. Kelly continued to play for City into the early 1950s, helping the club to their first Irish Cup success, a 3–1 victory over Glentoran in 1949.

=== League of Ireland ===
Although Kelly spent most of his career with Derry City, during the mid-1940s he played a couple of seasons in the League of Ireland, first with Shamrock Rovers and then with Dundalk. While on loan at Rovers he played alongside Peter Farrell, Tommy Eglington and Paddy Coad. He made his debut for Rovers on 22 February 1942, scoring the only goal in a league game at St. James's Gate.

Kelly spent the 1946–47 season at Dundalk and finished as the club's top scorer, scoring 6 in the league, 1 in the FAI Cup and 10 in other competitions. His goals helped the club finish as runners-up in the League of Ireland Shield. In 1947 Kelly also played three times for the League of Ireland XI.

== Irish international ==
When Kelly began his international career in 1931 there were, in effect, two Ireland teams, chosen by two rival associations. Both associations, the Northern Ireland – based IFA and the Irish Free State – based FAI claimed jurisdiction over the whole of Ireland and selected players from the whole island. As a result, several notable Irish players from this era, including Kelly, played for both teams. In 1936 Kelly had the unique experience of playing for two winning Irish teams within a week. On 11 March he helped the IFA XI beat Wales 3–2. Then on 17 March he was on the winning side again as the FAI XI defeated Switzerland 1–0.

=== IFA XI ===
Between 1931 and 1936 Kelly made 11 appearances and scored 4 goals for the IFA XI. He scored his first international goal on his debut on 17 October 1931 in a 6–2 defeat against England at Windsor Park. The other IFA XI goal that day was scored by Jimmy Dunne. In his next game on 12 December 1931 Kelly scored twice in a 4–0 win against Wales. These three goals saw Kelly finish as joint top scorer in the 1932 British Home Championship. He scored his fourth goal for the IFA XI on 11 November 1935 in 2–1 defeat against Scotland at Tynecastle. He made his last appearance for the IFA XI on 18 November 1936 in a 3–1 defeat to England.

=== FAI XI ===
Between 1932 and 1936 Kelly also played 5 times and scored 2 goals for the FAI XI. He made his debut on 5 May 1932 against the Netherlands and as a result became the first (Northern) Irish League player to play for an FAI XI. He subsequently helped them to a credible 2–0 win, setting up the second goal for Paddy Moore. Kelly made his second appearance for the FAI XI on 25 February 1934 at Dalymount Park when they made their World Cup debut in a qualifier against Belgium. Moore scored all four goals for the FAI XI as they came from 2–0, 3–1 and then 4–3 down to draw 4–4. Kelly turned provider for two of Moore's goals, one from a cross and one from a corner. He won his third cap from the FAI on 17 March 1936 in a 1–0 win against Switzerland.

Kelly made his final two appearances and scored his only two goals for the FAI XI during a European tour in May 1936. On 6 May he played in a 4–1 defeat to a Rhineland XI and then on 9 May he scored twice in a 5–1 win against Luxembourg. Jimmy Dunne also scored twice that day. Kelly would have won a further two caps for the FAI XI if it were not the IFA's then ban on Sunday football. He was initially called up for the game against Spain on 13 December 1931 and during the European tour of May 1936 he missed the opening game against Hungary. Both games fell on a Sunday and as a result Kelly missed out.

=== Irish League XI ===
Between 1931 and 1948 Kelly also played 16 games and scored 6 goals for the Irish League XI. He made his debut for the Irish League XI in October 1931, scoring twice in a 3–2 win against a Scottish League XI. He also scored the winner in a 2–1 victory over an English League XI in September 1935 and the following year he scored a hat-trick against the same opposition in a 3–2 win.

== Honours ==
Derry City

- Irish Cup
  - Winners 1949 1
  - Runners Up 1936 1

Dundalk

- FAI Cup
  - Runners Up 1946–47 1

Jimmy was still playing football in the 1950s/60s for sea eagle rovers.

== See also ==
- List of men's footballers with 500 or more goals
