= 1937–38 British Home Championship =

Tournament details
- Host country: England, Ireland, Scotland and Wales
- Dates: 23 October 1937 – 9 April 1938
- Teams: 4

Final positions
- Champions: England (25th title)
- Runners-up: Ireland; Scotland

Tournament statistics
- Matches played: 6
- Goals scored: 16 (2.67 per match)
- Top scorer: (England) George Mills (3)

The 1937–38 British Home Championship was a football tournament played between the British Home Nations during the 1937–38 season. The competition was won by England after they defeated Ireland and Wales in their opening games. Even though Scotland won the final game at Wembley Stadium, England were able to hold their lead, thanks to the Welsh victory over Scotland in their opening match. Wales however were unable to continue this form, losing to England and Ireland in their subsequent matches. The Scots and Irish drew, and thus shared second place.

== Table ==
Team	Pld	W	D	L	GF	GA	GD	Pts
England (C)	3	2	0	1	7	3	+4	4
Scotland	3	1	1	1	3	3	0	3
Ireland	3	1	1	1	3	6	−3	3
Wales	3	1	0	2	3	4	−1	2

Rules for classification: 1) points. The points system worked as follows: 2 points for a win and 1 point for a draw.
(C) Champions

== Results ==
23 October 1937

Ireland	1–5	England
Stevenson		Mills; Hall; Brook

Windsor Park, Belfast

30 October 1937

Wales	2–1	Scotland
Jones 25'; S. Morris 40'		Massie 72'

Ninian Park, Cardiff
Attendance: 41,800
Referee: Charles E. Argent (England)

10 November 1937

Scotland	1–1	Ireland
Smith 48'		Doherty 15'

Pittodrie Stadium, Aberdeen
Attendance: 21,878
Referee: Arthur James Jewell (England)

17 November 1937

England	2–1	Wales
Hall; Matthews		Perry

Ayresome Park, Middlesbrough

16 March 1938

Ireland	1–0	Wales
Bambrick

Windsor Park, Belfast

9 April 1938

England	0–1	Scotland
		Walker 6'

Wembley Stadium, London
Attendance: 93,267
Referee: William R. Hamilton (Ireland)
