= Billy Millar (footballer, born 1906) =

Northern Irish footballer

Billy Millar (born 25 October 1906, date of death unknown) was a Northern Irish footballer who played as a striker.

Millar was a forward who played three times for Liverpool during the 1928/29 first division season. He made a sensational start on his debut against Bury at Anfield on the opening day of the season by scoring in the very first minute and adding a second 20 minutes from time as the Reds won comfortably 3–0 in the premiere of the new roofed Spion Kop. Despite his excellent start Millar only figured twice more for the club's first team, struggling with injuries, against Sheffield United at home on 5 September which Liverpool lost 2–1 and in a 3–0 home victory against Newcastle on 13 October. Millar set a scoring record at Barrow by scoring 30 goals in 30 games in Third Division North and made his Northern-Ireland debut as a Barrow player. Millar had been chosen for the Irish team in October 1928 while at Liverpool, to face England at Goodison Park, but had to pull out due to injury.
