= Tommy Casey =

Northern Irish footballer (1930–2009)

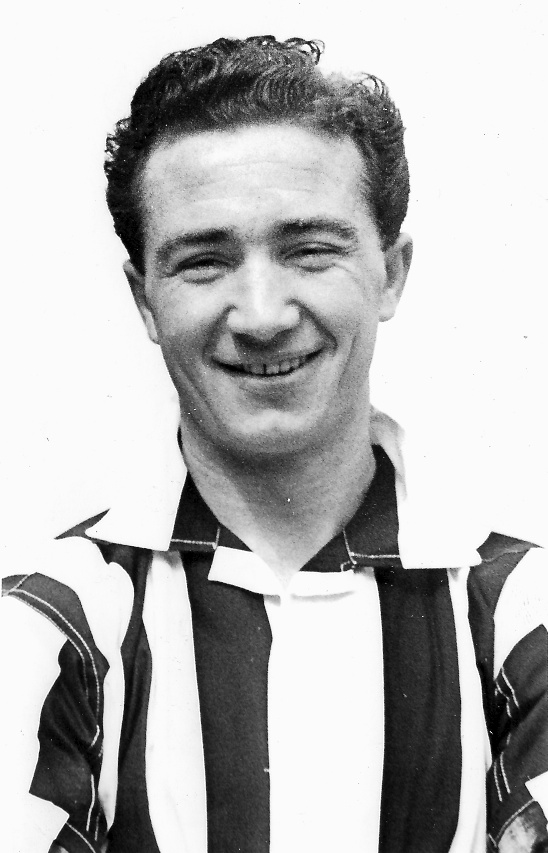
- Casey as a Newcastle United player

Personal information
- Full name: Thomas Casey
- Date of birth: 11 March 1930
- Place of birth: Comber, County Down, Northern Ireland
- Date of death: 13 January 2009 (aged 78)
- Place of death: Somerset, England
- Position: Wing half

Youth career
- Belfast YMCA
- East Belfast

Senior career*
Years	Team	Apps	(Gls)
–1949	Bangor		
1949–1950	Leeds United	4	(0)
1950–1952	Bournemouth & Boscombe Athletic	66	(1)
1952–1958	Newcastle United	116	(8)
1958–1959	Portsmouth	24	(1)
1959–1963	Bristol City	122	(9)
1963–1965	Gloucester City	60	(6)
1965	Toronto Inter-Roma		
1967	Ammanford Town		
Total		392	(25)

International career
1955–1958	Northern Ireland	12	(2)

Managerial career
- 1963–1965: Gloucester City (player-manager)
- 1967–1969: Lisburn Distillery (player-manager)
- 1972: Everton (caretaker-manager)
- 1974–1975: Northern Ireland Youth Team
- 1975–1976: Grimsby Town
- 1977: K.R. Reykjavik
- 1977–1978: Harstad I.L.
- * Club domestic league appearances and goals

Thomas Casey (11 March 1930 – 13 January 2009) was a Northern Ireland international footballer, coach and football manager, whose career in professional football spanned 30 years.

FA Cup winner with Newcastle United 1955

In 1965, he played abroad in the Eastern Canada Professional Soccer League with Toronto Inter-Roma.

== Honours ==
Newcastle United

- FA Cup: 1954–55
