= Eddie McMorran =

Northern Irish footballer (1923–1984)

- Eddie McMorran on a 1957 collectible football card

Personal information
- Full name: Edward James McMorran
- Date of birth: 2 September 1923
- Place of birth: Larne, Northern Ireland
- Date of death: 27 January 1984 (aged 60)
- Place of death: Larne, Northern Ireland
- Height: 5 ft 11 1/2 in (1.82 m)
- Positions: Inside forward; centre forward

Youth career
- Ballyclare Comrades
- Linfield Swifts
- Larne Olympic

Senior career*
Years	Team	Apps	(Gls)
1946–1947	Belfast Celtic	24	(30)
1947–1949	Manchester City	33	(12)
1949–1950	Leeds United	38	(6)
1950–1953	Barnsley	104	(32)
1953–1957	Doncaster Rovers	126	(32)
1957–1958	Crewe Alexandra	24	(6)
1958–1960	Frickley Colliery		

International career
1946–1953	Ireland and Northern Ireland	15	(4)

Managerial career
- 1960–?: Dodworth Miners Welfare F.C.
- * Club domestic league appearances and goals

Edward James "Eddie" McMorran (2 September 1923 – 27 January 1984) was a footballer who played as a centre forward and inside forward in the Football League, for Ireland and Northern Ireland.

McMorran was born in Larne, County Antrim and attended Larne School during which time he won Irish School Honours. He later played for Ballyclare Comrades, Linfield Swifts and Larne Olympic. He meanwhile began his working life as a blacksmith.

== Senior club career ==
=== Belfast Celtic ===
Belfast Celtic was his first senior club. In the 1946–47 season they won the League title, Irish Cup and Gold Cup. In only 24 league games he netted 30 times.

=== Manchester City ===
City signed him for £7,000 in July 1947. His debut was in a 4–3 victory against Wolves on 23 August when he scored the 3rd goal in front of a crowd of 65809. His time at Manchester wasn't as successful as had been expected with 12 goals in 36 games.

=== Leeds United ===
In January 1949 he moved to Leeds, who had just been relegated to Division 2, for £10,000. His debut was against Sheffield Wednesday on 22 January, and his first goal a week later in a victory against Blackburn Rovers. He scored 6 times in 40 games for Leeds.

=== Barnsley ===
McMorran was sold to Barnsley for £10,000 in July 1950.

=== Doncaster Rovers ===
In February 1953, McMorran was brought to Doncaster for then club record of £8,000 by fellow Irishman, player manager Peter Doherty, who also was manager of Northern Ireland at the time. This was a time when they were enjoying a successful period in League Division 2. In 1954 they made it to the Fifth Round of the FA Cup for the first time, knocking out big-spending Sunderland where McMorran scored twice in the 2–0 win. In total he scored 38 times in 139 games for Doncaster.

=== Crewe Alexandra ===
He finished his professional career by moving to Crewe for the season in November 1957. Crewe had finished the previous season bottom of Division 3 North and ended up in the same position this season.

After Crewe, he played for Frickley Colliery in the Midland League till the end of the 1959–60 season, still playing as centre forward. The following season, he became manager of Dodworth Miners Welfare in Yorkshire League Division Two.

== International career ==
He scored twice in two appearances for the Ireland Youth team in 1937. His first Ireland cap came against England in 1946, followed by Inter-League caps against the Football League and League of Ireland. His only international win was in his last game in a World Cup Qualifier in 1957 against Portugal where he scored in the 3–0 win.

== Honours ==
1946/47 with Belfast Celtic

- Regional League winners
- Irish Cup winners
- Gold Cup winners
