= Billy Elliott (footballer) =

English footballer and manager

Personal information
- Full name: William Henry Elliott
- Date of birth: 20 March 1925
- Place of birth: Bradford, England
- Date of death: 21 January 2008 (aged 82)
- Place of death: Sunderland, England
- Position: Winger

Youth career
- 1939–1942: Bradford Park Avenue

Senior career*
Years	Team	Apps	(Gls)
1942–1951	Bradford Park Avenue	176	(21)
1951–1953	Burnley	74	(14)
1953–1959	Sunderland	212	(26)
1959–1961	Wisbech Town	?	(?)

International career
1952	England	5	(3)

Managerial career
- 1961–1963: Libya
- 1966–1968: Daring FC
- 1972: Sunderland (caretaker)
- 1974–1978: Brann
- 1978–1979: Sunderland
- 1979–1983: Darlington
- * Club domestic league appearances and goals

William Henry Elliott (20 March 1925 – 21 January 2008), born in Bradford, was an English professional footballer and football manager. He played five times for the England national side.

== Sporting career ==
=== Playing career ===
Billy Elliott, a left winger, began his career with Bradford Park Avenue, joining as an amateur in 1939 and turning professional in March 1942. He scored 21 times in 176 league games for Bradford before a £23,000 move to Burnley in August 1951. He made his debut for England on 18 May 1952 in a 1–1 draw with Italy in Florence, also playing in the 3–2 win against Austria in Vienna a week later. The following season, he played the games against Northern Ireland, Wales and Belgium.

In June 1953, after fourteen goals in 74 league games for Burnley, Elliott moved to Sunderland in June 1953, costing £26,000. He played 212 games and scored 26 goals, in a six-year spell at the club, leaving in July 1959 to join Wisbech Town.

=== Coaching and managerial career ===
Elliott was manager of the Libya national side between October 1961 and 1963 when he returned to the UK and scouted for Sheffield Wednesday. In 1964 he moved to Germany to coach the US Forces teams, a post he held until July 1966 when he was appointed manager of Belgian side Daring FC. On leaving Daring in January 1968 he returned to Sunderland, as coach. Elliott was caretaker manager of Sunderland for four games in 1972 after the sacking of Alan Brown, remaining on the coaching staff under new manager Bob Stokoe until June 1973, leaving after Sunderland had won the FA Cup.

He coached Norwegian side Brann between 1974 and 1978 and in December 1978 returned to Sunderland as manager. He remained in charge until the end of the season, almost guiding Sunderland to promotion. The board decided that they wanted a younger man in charge, however, and sacked Elliott in favour of coach Ken Knighton.

In June 1979 he took over as manager of Darlington, where he remained until June 1983.

He died on 21 January 2008, aged 82.

== Honours ==
=== As a manager ===
Brann

- Norwegian Premier League runner-up: 1974–75
- Norwegian Football Cup winner: 1976
- Norwegian Football Cup runner-up: 1978

== Managerial statistics ==
Team	Nat	From	To	Record				
Team	Nat	From	To	G	W	L	D	Win %
Libya	Libya	October 1961	1963					
Daring FC	Belgium	July 1966	January 1968					
Sunderland	England	1972	1972					
Brann	Norway	1974	December 1978					
Sunderland	England	December 1978	May 1979	23	13	4	6	56.5
Darlington	England	June 1979	June 1983	184	56	74	54	30.4
