= Willie Hall (English footballer) =

English footballer

Personal information
- Full name: George William Hall
- Date of birth: 12 March 1912
- Place of birth: Newark, England
- Date of death: 22 May 1967 (aged 55)
- Height: 5 ft 6 1/2 in (1.69 m)
- Position: Inside forward

Senior career*
Years	Team	Apps	(Gls)
1930–1932	Notts County		
1932–1944	Tottenham Hotspur	202	(27)
Total		202	(27)

International career
1933–1939	England	10	(9)
- * Club domestic league appearances and goals

George William Hall (12 March 1912 – 22 May 1967) was an English footballer who played for Notts County, Tottenham Hotspur and the England national team during the 1930s.

== Football career ==
William “Willie” Hall (born in Newark, Nottinghamshire) was an English professional footballer who played primarily as an inside forward. He began his senior career with Notts County in 1930 before transferring to Tottenham Hotspur in 1932 for a fee of £2,600. Hall was noted for his versatility and dribbling ability, and in the later stages of his playing career he also appeared as a full-back.

Hall made his international debut for England against France in December 1933 and earned a total of ten caps. In a match against Ireland on 16 November 1938, he scored five goals within a 30-minute period spanning half-time. Three of the goals were scored within four minutes, a feat that remains the record for the fastest hat-trick by an England player in an international match.

During the Second World War, Hall continued to play in friendly matches for Tottenham Hotspur F.C. while also serving as a member of the London Police Reserve.

== Personal life ==
Hall was born to John William Hall and Elizabeth Hopkinson. He had several siblings: Kate, Hannah, Alice, Sarah, Herbert, Frances (who died aged one), Hilda, Florence, Cyril, Nellie, and Mary.

== Later career ==
Ill-health brought an end to his playing career in 1945 and he suffered the amputation of both lower legs. He continued his association with the game as a vice-president of the Spurs Supporters Club and in coaching roles at Clapton Orient and other clubs. Testimonial games were played at both Tottenham and Notts County grounds in 1946. From 1954 he became a publican. The Willie Hall Memorial Trophy is still played for each year having been inaugurated in 1967, the year he died, by the Newark Football Alliance. Hall's fame was enhanced on 16 February 1959, when he was chosen as the subject of This Is Your Life by BBC Television host Eamonn Andrews.

In his later years, no longer possessing the stamina of his earlier life, Hall spent increased time in his hometown of Newark, where he fished and shared recollections with family and longtime friends. After watching Tottenham Hotspur defeat Chelsea 2–1 in the FA Cup on 20 May, Hall died of a heart attack on 22 May 1967. A thanksgiving service was held on 30 May at St Mary Magdalene Church, followed by cremation. His ashes were subsequently interred at Newark Cemetery. Hall has been commemorated locally as a figure of notable bravery and talent. In addition to recognition through the N.A.L.H.S. plaque, his legacy is preserved in the Willie Hall Cup, which is presented annually to the winners of the Newark Sunday Alliance.

2006 brought his installation within the Tottenham Hotspur Hall of Fame.

== See also ==
- List of footballers who achieved hat-trick records
