= List of Coventry City F.C. players =

This is a list of notable footballers who have played for Coventry City Football Club from the beginning of the club's official records in 1883 to the present day.

For a list of all Coventry City players with a Wikipedia article, see Category:Coventry City F.C. players, and for the current squad see the main Coventry City F.C. article.

== Players with 100 or more first-team appearances ==
Correct as of match on 2 May 2026.

=== Explanation of list ===
Players should be listed in chronological order according to the year in which they first played for the club, and then by alphabetical order of their surname. Appearances and goals should include substitute appearances, but exclude wartime matches. Further information on competitions/seasons which are regarded as eligible for appearance stats are provided below, and if a player's data is not available for any of these competitions an appropriate note should be added to the table.

League appearances/goals

- Southern League: (1908–09 to 1914–15)
- Football League / Premier League: (1919–20 to present)

Total appearances/goals

The figures for total appearances/goals should include the League figures together with the following competitions:

- FA Cup (1895–96 to present)
- Football League Cup (1960–61 to present)
- Football League Trophy (2012–13 to 2019–20)
- Football League Third Division South Cup (1933–34 to 1935–36)
- Full Members Cup (1985–86 to 1991–92)
- Fairs Cup (1970–71)
- Texaco Cup (1971–72 to 1973–74)
- FA Charity Shield (1987–88)
- English Football League play-offs (2017–18, 2022–23)

=== Chronology of players ===
Coventry City F.C. Hall of Fame inductee

Nationality	Name	Pos	Coventry career	League apps	League goals	Total apps	Total goals	Ref
England	Fred Chaplin	MF	1907–1912	127	1	149	2	
England	Harold Parkes	FW	1907–1914	161	35	171	38	
Northern Ireland	Harold Redmond Buckle	MF	1908–1911	113	43	126	46	
England	Dick Barnacle	DF	1908–1915	129	1	139	1	
England	Eli Bradley	DF	1909–1912	104	19	116	20	
Wales	Bob Evans	GK	1909–1913	127	0	139	0	
England	Albert Holmes	FW	1911–1915	101	17	107	17	
England	Alick Mercer	FW	1919–1923	102	18	106	19	
Scotland	Jimmy Dougall	FW	1919–1926	226	14	236	14	
England	Jerry Best	GK	1920–1926	224	0	235	0	
England	Jack Randle	DF	1922–1927	149	0	156	0	
England	Fred Herbert	FW	1922–1929	188	82	199	85	
England	William Lake	FW	1928–1939	226	113	245	123	
Wales	Jimmy Baker	MF	1929–1932, 1933–1935	182	11	196	15	
England	Clarrie Bourton	FW	1931–1937	228	173	241	182	
Scotland	Jock Lauderdale	FW	1931–1937	171	60	182	63	
England	George Mason	DF	1931–1952	330	7	350	9	
England	Billy Frith	MF	1932–1939, 1946–1947	163	4	171	4	
Wales	Leslie Jones	FW	1934–1937	139	69	145	73	
England	Alf Wood	GK	1935–1951, 1955–1959	234	0	246	0	
England	Jack Astley	DF	1936–1939	140	0	145	0	
England	Ted Roberts	FW	1936–1952	211	85	222	87	
England	Harry Barratt	DF	1937–1952	169	12	177	13	
England	Dick Mason	DF	1946–1954	252	1	262	1	
England	Peter Murphy	FW	1946–1950	113	36	118	36	
Northern Ireland	Norman Lockhart	FW	1947–1952	181	41	188	44	
England	Peter Hill	FW	1948–1962	285	75	303	77	
England	Martin McDonnell	DF	1949–1955	232	0	245	0	
England	Reg Matthews	GK	1950–1956	111	0	116	0	
England	Roy Kirk	DF	1951–1960	330	6	345	7	
England	Frank Austin	DF	1950–1963	302	2	313	2	
England	George Curtis	DF	1955–1969	487	11	538	13	
England	Frank Kletzenbauer	DF	1956–1964	122	3	132	3	
Wales	Brian Nicholas	MF	1957–1962	113	0	121	0	
England	Brian Hill	DF	1957–1971	246	12	284	13	
England	Ray Straw	FW	1957–1961	143	79	152	85	
England	Mick Kearns	DF	1957–1968	344	14	382	16	
South Africa	Arthur Lightening	GK	1958–1963	153	0	163	0	
England	Ron Farmer	MF	1958–1968	281	47	311	52	
England	Bob Wesson	GK	1960–1966	133	0	156	0	
Germany	Dietmar Bruck	DF	1961–1970	189	7	217	8	
Northern Ireland	Billy Humphries	MF	1962–1965	109	23	126	24	
England	George Hudson	FW	1962–1966	113	62	129	75	
England	Ken Hale	FW	1962–1966	99	27	111	33	
England	John Sillett	DF	1962–1966	109	1	128	2	
Wales	Ronnie Rees	MF	1962–1968	230	42	262	52	
England	Ernie Machin	MF	1963–1972	257	33	289	39	
Northern Ireland	Dave Clements	MF	1964–1971	230	26	257	29	
England	Bill Glazier	GK	1964–1975	346	0	395	0	
Scotland	Ian Gibson	MF	1966–1970	93	13	101	14	
England	Mick Coop	DF	1966–1981	425	18	492	22	
Scotland	Willie Carr	MF	1967–1975	252	33	280	36	
Scotland	Neil Martin	FW	1968–1971	106	40	122	45	
England	Jeff Blockley	DF	1968–1972	146	6	161	8	
England	Ernie Hunt	FW	1968–1973	146	45	166	51	
England	Chris Cattlin	DF	1968–1976	217	0	237	0	
England	Dennis Mortimer	MF	1969–1975	193	10	215	10	
United States	Alan Green	FW	1970–1979	117	30	132	34	
Scotland	Brian Alderson	MF	1970–1975	127	29	153	41	
England	Wilf Smith	DF	1970–1975	135	1	153	2	
Republic of Ireland	Jimmy Holmes	DF	1970–1977	128	6	150	6	
England	Mick Ferguson	FW	1971–1981, 1984	134	54	141	57	
Scotland	Jim Blyth	GK	1972–1982	151	0	174	0	
Scotland	Tommy Hutchison	MF	1972–1981	314	24	355	30	
England	David Cross	FW	1973–1976	103	32	118	38	
England	John Craven	MF	1973–1977	89	8	108	8	
England	Harry Roberts	DF	1974–1984	215	1	249	2	
England	Barry Powell	MF	1975–1979	164	27	179	29	
Scotland	Bobby McDonald	DF	1976–1981	161	14	180	15	
Wales	Terry Yorath	MF	1976–1979	99	3	108	3	
England	Les Sealey	GK	1976–1983, 1992	160	0	179	0	
Scotland	Ian Wallace	FW	1976–1980	130	58	138	60	
England	Garry Thompson	FW	1977–1983	134	38	159	49	
Scotland	Jim Holton	DF	1977–1981	91	0	100	1	
Scotland	Andy Blair	MF	1978–1981	93	6	112	9	
England	Steve Jacobs	DF	1978–1984	101	0	115	0	
England	Stephen Hunt	MF	1978–1984	185	27	215	34	
England	Paul Dyson	DF	1978–1983	140	5	165	5	
Scotland	Gary Gillespie	DF	1978–1983, 1994–1997	175	6	205	6	
England	Mark Hateley	FW	1978–1983	93	25	113	34	
England	Danny Thomas	DF	1979–1983	98	4	123	6	
Republic of Ireland	Gerry Daly	MF	1980–1984	84	19	101	22	
England	Ian Butterworth	DF	1981–1985	90	0	101	0	
England	Lloyd McGrath	MF	1982–1994	214	4	253	5	
England	Micky Gynn	MF	1983–1993	241	32	285	43	
England	Dave Bennett	MF	1983–1989	172	25	201	33	
England	Micky Adams	DF	1983–1987	90	9	106	10	
England	Terry Gibson	FW	1983–1986	98	43	113	52	
England	Trevor Peake	DF	1983–1991	278	6	336	7	
England	Brian Kilcline	DF	1984–1991	173	28	218	35	
England	Steve Ogrizovic	GK	1984–2000	507	1	601	1	
England	Cyrille Regis	FW	1984–1991	238	47	283	62	
England	Greg Downs	DF	1985–1990	146	4	175	7	
England	Brian Borrows	DF	1985–1997	409	11	477	13	
Wales	David Phillips	MF	1986–1989	100	8	117	9	
England	David Smith	MF	1986–1993	154	18	177	18	
England	Dean Emerson	MF	1986–1992	114	0	128	0	
Scotland	David Speedie	FW	1987–1991	122	31	141	34	
Scotland	Kevin Gallacher	FW	1990–1993	100	28	115	35	
England	Peter Atherton	DF	1991–1994	114	0	120	0	
England	Sean Flynn	MF	1991–1995	97	9	105	10	
Zimbabwe	Peter Ndlovu	FW	1991–1997	176	39	196	43	
England	Dion Dublin	FW	1994–1998	145	61	170	72	
England	Marcus Hall	DF	1994–2002, 2005–2010	270	2	308	4	
England	David Burrows	DF	1995–2000	111	0	130	0	
England	Richard Shaw	DF	1995–2006	317	1	362	1	
Scotland	Paul Telfer	MF	1995–2001	191	6	227	12	
England	Noel Whelan	FW	1995–2000	133	31	155	39	
England	Paul Williams	DF	1995–2001	169	5	199	6	
England	Darren Huckerby	FW	1996–1999	94	28	109	34	
Scotland	Gary McAllister	MF	1996–2000, 2002–2004	174	30	200	38	
Republic of Ireland	Gary Breen	DF	1997–2002	146	2	171	2	
Sweden	Magnus Hedman	GK	1997–2002	134	0	151	0	
England	Gary McSheffrey	FW	1998–2006, 2010–2013	247	61	281	72	
Morocco	Youssef Chippo	MF	1999–2003	122	6	132	10	
Bosnia and Herzegovina	Muhamed Konjić	DF	1999–2004	138	4	155	4	
Nigeria	Dele Adebola	FW	2003–2008	163	31	182	36	
Republic of Ireland	Michael Doyle	MF	2003–2011, 2017–2019	331	26	380^{[A]}	29	
England	Andy Morrell	FW	2003–2006	98	17	111	19	
England	Isaac Osbourne	MF	2003–2011	122	0	135	0	
England	Andy Whing	DF	2003–2007	106	2	119	2	
England	Stephen Hughes	MF	2004–2008	133	6	144	8	
Republic of Ireland	Jay Tabb	MF	2006–2009	95	11	104	12	
England	Elliott Ward	DF	2006–2010	116	14	126	16	
Republic of Ireland	Leon Best	FW	2007–2010	92	19	104	23	
Wales	Freddy Eastwood	FW	2008–2012	113	17	124	18	
Iceland	Aron Gunnarsson	MF	2008–2011	122	6	133	7	
Republic of Ireland	Clinton Morrison	FW	2008–2010	91	21	101	23	
Republic of Ireland	Keiren Westwood	GK	2008–2011	131	0	138	0	
England	Jordan Clarke	DF	2008–2015	125	4	144	4	
England	Martin Cranie	DF	2009–2012	114	1	120	1	
England	Richard Wood	DF	2009–2013	117	8	134	9	
Northern Ireland	Sammy Clingan	MF	2009–2012	98	7	100	7	
England	Carl Baker	MF	2010–2014, 2018	160	21	182	28	
England	Cyrus Christie	DF	2010–2014	102	3	119	4	
England	Conor Thomas	MF	2010–2016	99	1	116	1	
Republic of Ireland	Joe Murphy	GK	2011–2014	137	0	156	0	
England	Jordan Willis	DF	2011–2019	179	4	208^{[A]}	8^{[B]}	
England	Lee Burge	GK	2011–2019	140	0	160^{[A]}	0	
Scotland	John Fleck	MF	2012–2016	162	8	182	8	
Republic of Ireland	Jordan Shipley	MF	2016–2022	133	16	163^{[A]}	20^{[B]}	
Scotland	Liam Kelly	MF	2017–2024	155	3	180^{[A]}	3	
Scotland	Dominic Hyam	DF	2017–2022	166	8	192^{[A]}	9	
France	Maxime Biamou	FW	2017–2021	95	14	116^{[A]}	26^{[B]}	
England	Josh Eccles	MF	2018–	166	9	197^{[A]}	9	
England	Callum O'Hare	MF	2019–2024	162	17	182	22	
England	Kyle McFadzean	DF	2019–2024	155	8	171^{[A]}	8	
England	Fankaty Dabo	DF	2019–2023	116	0	131^{[A]}	0	
Scotland	Michael Rose	DF	2019–2023	101	4	116	4	
England	Jamie Allen	MF	2019–2026	174	11	200^{[A]}	12	
England	Matt Godden	FW	2019–2024	138	46	156^{[A]}	50	
England	Ben Wilson	GK	2019–	97	1	123^{[A]}	1	
Netherlands	Gustavo Hamer	MF	2020–2023, 2026–	123	17	132^{[A]}	19^{[B]}	
England	Ben Sheaf	MF	2020–2025	161	7	177^{[A]}	9	
Sweden	Viktor Gyökeres	FW	2021–2023	110	41	116^{[A]}	43	
England	Jake Bidwell	DF	2022–	134	3	150^{[A]}	3	
Netherlands	Milan van Ewijk	DF	2023–	131	4	145^{[A]}	4	
England	Ellis Simms	FW	2023–	132	32	145	40	
England	Bobby Thomas	DF	2023–	115	10	129^{[A]}	10	
Wales	Jay Dasilva	DF	2023–	110	0	122^{[A]}	0	
United States	Haji Wright	FW	2023–	111	45	124^{[A]}	49	
Japan	Tatsuhiro Sakamoto	MF	2023–	106	18	117^{[A]}	18	
England	Liam Kitching	DF	2023–	93	3	106^{[A]}	4	
Jamaica	Joel Latibeaudiere	DF	2023–	89	2	100	4	
Denmark	Victor Torp	MF	2024–	90	16	102	17	

=== Note regarding play-off appearances and goals ===
A. The following players' numbers include appearances in English Football League play-offs matches (only listing players with 100+ total appearances):

Player(s)	Play-off apps
Kelly	6
Allen, Wilson	5
Eccles, Sheaf	4
Doyle, Burge, Shipley, Hyam, Biamou, McFadzean, Godden, Hamer, Gyökeres, Bidwell	3
Willis, Dabo, van Ewijk, Thomas, Dasilva, Wright, Sakamoto, Kitching	2

B. The following players' numbers include goals in English Football League play-offs matches (only listing players with 100+ total appearances):

Player(s)	Play-off goals
Biamou, Hamer	2
Willis, Shipley	1

== Players who have scored hat-tricks for the club ==
Correct as of match on 2 May 2026.

=== Chronology of hat-trick players ===
Nationality	Name	Pos	Result	Date	Season	Tier/Cup
England	Albert E. Lewis	FW	Bishop Auckland 2–6 Coventry City	21 September 1907	1907–08	FA Cup
England	Albert E. Lewis (2)	FW	Coventry City 7–1 Bishop Auckland	7 December 1907	1907–08	FA Cup
Northern Ireland	Harold Redmond Buckle	MF	Coventry City 5–3 Portsmouth	13 April 1909	1908–09	3
Northern Ireland	Harold Redmond Buckle (2)	MF	Coventry City 5–1 Southend United	17 December 1910	1910–11	3
England	Billy Smith^{[D]}	FW	Coventry City 9–0 Brentford	27 December 1911	1911–12	3
England	Fred Jones	FW	Coventry City 4–1 Plymouth Argyle	2 March 1912	1911–12	3
England	Harold Parkes	FW	Coventry City 4–1 West Ham United	28 December 1912	1912–13	3
England	Albert Holmes	FW	Coventry City 4–4 Northampton Town	29 March 1913	1912–13	3
England	George A. Davison	FW	Coventry City 3–1 Watford	18 April 1914	1913–14	3
England	John Allan	MF	Coventry City 6–0 Ebbw Vale	14 November 1914	1914–15	4
England	John Allan (2)	MF	Coventry City 10–1 Newport County	28 November 1914	1914–15	4
Republic of Ireland	Joe Enright^{[C]}	FW	Coventry City 10–1 Newport County	28 November 1914	1914–15	4
England	John Allan (3)	MF	Coventry City 7–2 Ton Pentre	13 February 1915	1914–15	4
England	Alick Mercer	FW	Coventry City 3–0 Bury	7 October 1922	1922–23	2
England	William Toms	FW	Coventry City 7–1 Wolverhampton Wanderers	25 December 1922	1922–23	2
England	Arthur Wood	MF	Coventry City 3–0 Barnsley	7 April 1923	1922–23	2
Scotland	Hugh Richmond	FW	Coventry City 4–0 Nelson	10 November 1923	1923–24	2
England	Albert Pynegar	FW	Coventry City 5–2 Oldham Athletic	5 April 1924	1923–24	2
England	Albert Pynegar (2)	FW	Coventry City 3–1 Stoke	31 January 1925	1924–25	2
Scotland	Bill Paterson^{[C]}	FW	Coventry City 4–0 Doncaster Rovers	12 September 1925	1925–26	3
England	Fred Herbert	FW	Coventry City 7–0 Rotherham United	7 November 1925	1925–26	3
England	Jimmy Heathcote	FW	Coventry City 6–2 Bournemouth and Boscombe Athletic	25 September 1926	1926–27	3
England	Fred Herbert^{[C]} (2)	FW	Coventry City 5–1 Watford	1 January 1927	1926–27	3
England	Jimmy Heathcote (2)	FW	Coventry City 3–1 Brentford	12 March 1927	1926–27	3
England	Norman Dinsdale	DF	Queens Park Rangers 1–5 Coventry City	26 April 1928	1927–28	3
Scotland	Walter Johnstone	FW	Coventry City 6–1 Merthyr Town	22 September 1928	1928–29	3
England	William Lake	FW	Coventry City 3–1 Norwich City	9 November 1929	1929–30	3
England	William Lake^{[C]} (2)	FW	Coventry City 5–1 Bristol Rovers	21 March 1931	1930–31	3
England	Clarrie Bourton^{[D]}	FW	Coventry City 6–1 Bournemouth and Boscombe Athletic	17 October 1931	1931–32	3
England	Clarrie Bourton (2)	FW	Coventry City 4–2 Leyton Orient	14 November 1931	1931–32	3
England	Clarrie Bourton^{[C]} (3)	FW	Coventry City 5–1 Mansfield Town	12 December 1931	1931–32	3
England	Clarrie Bourton (4)	FW	Coventry City 5–1 Reading	25 December 1931	1931–32	3
England	William Lake (3)	FW	Coventry City 5–5 Fulham	2 January 1932	1931–32	3
England	Clarrie Bourton (5)	FW	Coventry City 8–0 Crystal Palace	6 February 1932	1931–32	3
England	Harold Holmes	MF	Coventry City 6–4 Gillingham	13 February 1932	1931–32	3
England	Clarrie Bourton (6)	FW	Mansfield Town 3–3 Coventry City	23 April 1932	1931–32	3
England	Clarrie Bourton (7)	FW	Coventry City 5–0 Watford	30 April 1932	1931–32	3
England	Clarrie Bourton (8)	FW	Coventry City 6–0 Bristol City	27 December 1932	1932–33	3
England	Harold Holmes (2)	MF	Coventry City 5–0 Torquay United	31 December 1932	1932–33	3
England	William Lake (4)	FW	Coventry City 7–0 Queens Park Rangers	4 March 1933	1932–33	3
England	Clarrie Bourton (9)	FW	Coventry City 5–1 Swindon Town	23 September 1933	1933–34	3
England	Clarrie Bourton (10)	FW	Torquay United 1–3 Coventry City	18 November 1933	1933–34	3
England	Arthur Bacon^{[D]}	FW	Gillingham 3–7 Coventry City	30 December 1933	1933–34	3
England	Arthur Bacon^{[C]} (2)	FW	Coventry City 5–1 Crystal Palace	6 January 1934	1933–34	3
Wales	Leslie Jones	FW	Coventry City 4–1 Bournemouth and Boscombe Athletic	3 April 1934	1933–34	3
England	Clarrie Bourton^{[C]} (11)	FW	Coventry City 9–0 Bristol City	28 April 1934	1933–34	3
Wales	Leslie Jones (2)	FW	Coventry City 4–0 Leyton Orient	3 September 1934	1934–35	3
Wales	Leslie Jones (3)	FW	Coventry City 6–3 Southend United	15 December 1934	1934–35	3
Wales	Leslie Jones (4)	FW	Gillingham 2–5 Coventry City	26 December 1934	1934–35	3
Wales	Leslie Jones (5)	FW	Coventry City 5–0 Newport County	26 January 1935	1934–35	3
England	Clarrie Bourton (12)	FW	Coventry City 7–1 Newport County	7 September 1935	1935–36	3
England	Clarrie Bourton (13)	FW	Coventry City 8–1 Crystal Palace	9 November 1935	1935–36	3
Wales	Leslie Jones (6)	FW	Coventry City 6–1 Queens Park Rangers	1 February 1936	1935–36	3
England	George McNestry	FW	Coventry City 5–1 Cardiff City	22 February 1936	1935–36	3
Scotland	Tony McPhee	FW	Fulham 3–4 Coventry City	11 December 1937	1937–38	2
England	William Lake^{[C]} (5)	FW	Luton Town 1–4 Coventry City	19 February 1938	1937–38	2
Scotland	Tom Crawley	FW	Coventry City 5–1 Nottingham Forest	28 January 1939	1938–39	2
England	George Ashall	MF	Millwall 3–5 Coventry City	2 November 1946	1946–47	2
Wales	George Lowrie	FW	Coventry City 5–2 Newport County	11 January 1947	1946–47	FA Cup
Wales	George Lowrie (2)	FW	Coventry City 6–0 Newport County	18 January 1947	1946–47	2
Wales	George Lowrie^{[C]} (3)	FW	Coventry City 5–1 Sheffield Wednesday	5 April 1947	1947–48	2
Wales	George Lowrie (4)	FW	Coventry City 3–2 Swansea Town	8 April 1947	1946–47	2
Wales	George Lowrie (5)	FW	Coventry City 3–1 Bury	19 April 1947	1946–47	2
Wales	George Lowrie^{[C]} (6)	FW	Coventry City 4–1 Luton Town	23 August 1947	1947–48	2
Wales	George Lowrie (7)	FW	Brentford 1–4 Coventry City	30 August 1947	1947–48	2
Wales	George Lowrie^{[C]} (8)	FW	Coventry City 5–0 Bradford Park Avenue	8 November 1947	1947–48	2
England	Jack Marsh	FW	Plymouth Argyle 2–3 Coventry City	9 April 1949	1948–49	2
England	Peter Murphy	FW	Coventry City 3–0 Chesterfield	3 December 1949	1949–50	2
England	Peter Murphy (2)	FW	Coventry City 5–1 West Ham United	11 April 1950	1949–50	2
Scotland	Ken Chisholm	FW	Coventry City 4–1 Luton Town	9 December 1950	1950–51	2
England	Ted Roberts	FW	Coventry City 3–3 Nottingham Forest	27 October 1951	1951–52	2
England	Don Dorman	MF	Coventry City 4–2 Crystal Palace	29 November 1952	1952–53	3
England	Eddy Brown	FW	Coventry City 7–2 Torquay United	13 December 1952	1952–53	3
England	Don Dorman (2)	MF	Coventry City 7–2 Torquay United	13 December 1952	1952–53	3
Wales	George Lowrie (9)	FW	Coventry City 4–1 Millwall	14 February 1953	1952–53	3
England	Eddy Brown (2)	FW	Colchester United 0–3 Coventry City	10 October 1953	1953–54	3
England	Eddy Brown (3)	FW	Brentford 2–3 Coventry City	28 August 1954	1954–55	3
England	Barry Hawkings	FW	Coventry City 6–0 Swindon Town	1 October 1955	1955–56	3
England	Ken McPherson	FW	Coventry City 4–2 Bournemouth and Boscombe Athletic	23 April 1957	1956–57	3
Scotland	Bill Patrick	FW	Coventry City 6–1 Exeter City	9 November 1957	1957–58	3
England	Jimmy Rogers	FW	Coventry City 6–0 Aldershot	17 March 1958	1957–58	3
England	Ray Straw	FW	Coventry City 4–1 Walsall	24 March 1958	1957–58	3
England	Ray Straw (2)	FW	Coventry City 5–0 Shrewsbury Town	8 April 1958	1957–58	3
England	Jimmy Rogers^{[C]} (2)	FW	Coventry City 7–1 Aldershot	22 September 1958	1958–59	4
England	Ray Straw (3)	FW	Coventry City 7–1 Aldershot	22 September 1958	1958–59	4
England	Jimmy Rogers (3)	FW	Aldershot 0–4 Coventry City	1 October 1958	1958–59	4
Scotland	George Stewart^{[C]}	FW	Carlisle United 1–6 Coventry City	14 February 1959	1958–59	4
England	Ken Satchwell^{[C]}	FW	Coventry City 5–3 Wrexham	25 December 1959	1959–60	3
England	Ray Straw (4)	FW	Mansfield Town 2–4 Coventry City	4 April 1960	1959–60	3
England	Bill Myerscough	FW	Coventry City 4–1 Newport County	27 August 1960	1960–61	3
Wales	Ron Hewitt	FW	Coventry City 4–0 Hull City	4 February 1961	1960–61	3
Wales	Ron Hewitt (2)	FW	Coventry City 5–1 Torquay United	20 February 1961	1960–61	3
England	Terry Bly	FW	Coventry City 3–4 Southend United	1 September 1962	1962–63	3
England	Terry Bly (2)	FW	Coventry City 4–1 Queens Park Rangers	9 March 1963	1962–63	3
England	George Hudson	FW	Coventry City 5–4 Halifax Town	6 April 1963	1962–63	3
England	Ron Farmer	MF	Coventry City 5–1 Crystal Palace	24 August 1963	1963–64	3
Wales	Ronnie Rees	MF	Coventry City 8–1 Shrewsbury Town	22 October 1963	1963–64	3
England	George Hudson (2)	FW	Trowbridge Town 1–6 Coventry City	16 November 1963	1963–64	FA Cup
England	George Hudson (3)	FW	Queens Park Rangers 3–6 Coventry City	30 November 1963	1963–64	3
England	George Kirby	FW	Coventry City 4–1 Oldham Athletic	28 March 1964	1963–64	3
England	George Hudson (4)	FW	Leyton Orient 1–3 Coventry City	28 April 1965	1964–65	2
England	Ray Pointer	FW	Coventry City 5–1 Preston North End	1 January 1966	1965–66	2
England	Bobby Gould	FW	Coventry City 5–0 Ipswich Town	9 December 1966	1966–67	2
England	Bobby Gould (2)	FW	Coventry City 5–1 Burnley	16 December 1967	1967–68	1
Scotland	Neil Martin	FW	Coventry City 3–0 Sheffield Wednesday	24 February 1968	1967–68	1
England	Ernie Hunt	FW	Coventry City 4–2 West Bromwich Albion	27 August 1968	1968–69	1
Scotland	Willie Carr	MF	Coventry City 3–1 West Bromwich Albion	12 August 1969	1969–70	1
England	John O'Rourke	FW	Trakia Plovdiv 1–4 Coventry City	16 September 1970	1970–71	Fairs Cup
Scotland	Colin Stein	FW	Coventry City 5–1 Darlington	8 October 1973	1973–74	League Cup
England	David Cross	FW	Everton 1–4 Coventry City	16 August 1975	1975–76	1
United States	Alan Green	FW	Coventry City 3–1 Wolverhampton Wanderers	17 April 1976	1975–76	1
England	David Cross (2)	FW	Burnley 1–3 Coventry City	24 April 1976	1975–76	1
Scotland	Ian Wallace	FW	Coventry City 5–2 Stoke City	30 April 1977	1976–77	1
England	Mick Ferguson	FW	Coventry City 4–2 Manchester City	4 October 1977	1977–78	1
England	Mick Ferguson (2)	FW	Wolverhampton Wanderers 1–3 Coventry City	29 October 1977	1977–78	1
England	Mick Ferguson (3)	FW	Coventry City 4–0 Birmingham City	4 March 1978	1977–78	1
Scotland	Ian Wallace (2)	FW	Coventry City 4–0 Southampton	21 April 1979	1978–79	1
England	Mick Ferguson^{[C]} (4)	FW	Coventry City 4–1 Ipswich Town	1 December 1979	1979–80	1
England	Tommy English	FW	Coventry City 4–1 Leicester City	14 March 1981	1980–81	1
England	Mark Hateley	FW	Southampton 5–5 Coventry City	4 May 1982	1981–82	1
England	Steve Whitton	FW	Manchester City 1–3 Coventry City	8 May 1982	1981–82	1
Scotland	Jim Melrose	FW	Coventry City 4–2 Everton	25 September 1982	1982–83	1
England	Terry Gibson	FW	Coventry City 4–0 Liverpool	10 December 1983	1983–84	1
England	Cyrille Regis^{[D]}	FW	Coventry City 7–0 Chester City	8 October 1985	1985–86	League Cup
Scotland	David Speedie	FW	Coventry City 3–4 Middlesbrough	1 October 1988	1988–89	1
Scotland	David Speedie (2)	FW	Coventry City 5–0 Sheffield Wednesday	2 January 1989	1988–89	1
England	Steve Livingstone^{[C]}	FW	Coventry City 5–0 Sunderland	24 January 1990	1989–90	League Cup
Scotland	Kevin Gallacher	FW	Coventry City 5–4 Nottingham Forest	28 November 1990	1990–91	League Cup
England	Micky Quinn	FW	Arsenal 0–3 Coventry City	14 August 1993	1993–94	1
Zimbabwe	Peter Ndlovu	FW	Liverpool 2–3 Coventry City	14 March 1995	1994–95	1
England	Dion Dublin	FW	Sheffield Wednesday 4–3 Coventry City	4 December 1995	1995–96	1
England	Dion Dublin (2)	FW	Coventry City 3–2 Chelsea	9 August 1997	1997–98	1
England	Darren Huckerby	FW	Leeds United 3–3 Coventry City	25 April 1998	1997–98	1
England	Darren Huckerby (2)	FW	Coventry City 7–0 Macclesfield Town	2 January 1999	1998–99	FA Cup
England	Darren Huckerby (3)	FW	Coventry City 4–0 Nottingham Forest	9 January 1999	1998–99	1
Australia	John Aloisi	FW	Coventry City 4–1 Preston North End	27 September 2000	2000–01	League Cup
England	Lee Hughes	FW	Crewe Alexandra 1–6 Coventry City	9 February 2002	2001–02	2
England	Gary McSheffrey	FW	Coventry City 8–0 Rushden & Diamonds	2 October 2002	2002–03	League Cup
Wales	Freddy Eastwood	FW	Coventry City 3–2 Peterborough United	12 December 2009	2009–10	2
England	Jacob Murphy	FW	Coventry City 4–1 Gillingham	21 November 2015	2015–16	3
England	Adam Armstrong	FW	Crewe Alexandra 0–5 Coventry City	2 January 2016	2015–16	3
England	Jodi Jones	MF	Coventry City 3–0 Notts County	5 August 2017	2017–18	4
Scotland	Marc McNulty	FW	Coventry City 4–0 Grimsby Town	24 March 2018	2017–18	4
Scotland	Marc McNulty (2)	FW	Cheltenham Town 1–6 Coventry City	28 April 2018	2017–18	4
France	Maxime Biamou	FW	Coventry City 3–2 Southampton U21	5 November 2019	2019–20	EFL Trophy
England	Matt Godden	FW	Wycombe Wanderers 1–4 Coventry City	29 December 2019	2019–20	3
England	Matt Godden (2)	FW	Tranmere Rovers 1–4 Coventry City	1 January 2020	2019–20	3
England	Ellis Simms	FW	Coventry City 5–0 Maidstone United	26 February 2024	2023–24	FA Cup
England	Ellis Simms (2)	FW	Coventry City 5–0 Rotherham United	5 March 2024	2023–24	2
United States	Haji Wright	FW	Coventry City 3–0 Sunderland	15 March 2025	2024–25	2
United States	Haji Wright (2)	FW	Coventry City 3–1 Middlesbrough	16 February 2026	2025–26	2
England	Ellis Simms (3)	FW	Watford 0–4 Coventry City	2 May 2026	2025–26	2

=== Players with multiple hat-tricks ===
Coventry City F.C. Hall of Fame inductee

Nationality	Name	Pos	Hat-tricks	Coventry career	Total apps	Total goals
England	Clarrie Bourton	FW	13	1931–1937	241	182
Wales	George Lowrie	FW	9	1939–1948, 1952–1953	85	59
Wales	Leslie Jones	FW	6	1934–1937	145	73
England	William Lake	FW	5	1928–1939	245	123
England	Mick Ferguson	FW	4	1971–1981, 1984	141	57
England	George Hudson	FW	4	1962–1966	129	75
England	Ray Straw	FW	4	1957–1961	152	85
England	John Allan	MF	3	1914–1919	30	21
England	Eddy Brown	FW	3	1952–1954	89	51
England	Darren Huckerby	FW	3	1996–1999	109	34
England	Jimmy Rogers	FW	3	1956–1958	80	27
England	Ellis Simms	FW	3	2023–	145	40
England	Arthur Bacon	FW	2	1933–1935	16	17
England	Terry Bly	FW	2	1962–1963	42	29
Northern Ireland	Harold Redmond Buckle	MF	2	1908–1911	126	46
England	David Cross	FW	2	1973–1976	118	38
England	Don Dorman	MF	2	1951–1954	94	31
England	Dion Dublin	FW	2	1994–1998	170	72
England	Matt Godden	FW	2	2019–2024	156	50
England	Bobby Gould	FW	2	1963–1968	89	42
England	Jimmy Heathcote	FW	2	1926–1928	65	37
England	Fred Herbert	FW	2	1922–1929	199	85
Wales	Ron Hewitt	FW	2	1960–1962	63	24
England	Harold Holmes	MF	2	1931–1933	22	12
England	Albert E. Lewis	FW	2	1907–1908	8	8
Scotland	Marc McNulty	FW	2	2017–2018	52	28
England	Peter Murphy	FW	2	1946–1950	118	36
England	Albert Pynegar	FW	2	1924–1925	55	26
Scotland	David Speedie	FW	2	1987–1991	141	34
Scotland	Ian Wallace	FW	2	1976–1980	138	60
United States	Haji Wright	FW	2	2023–	124	49

=== Note regarding players with 4 or 5 goals in one match ===
The following hat-tricks saw the player score 4 or 5 goals:

C. Four goals scored	Enright against Newport County; Paterson against Doncaster Rovers; Herbert against Watford; Bourton against Bristol City and Mansfield Town; Lake against Bristol Rovers and Luton Town; Bacon against Crystal Palace; Lowrie against Sheffield Wednesday, Luton Town and Bradford PA; Rogers against Aldershot; Stewart against Carlisle; Satchwell against Wrexham; Ferguson against Ipswich Town; Livingstone against Sunderland
D. Five goals scored	Smith against Brentford; Bourton against Bournemouth and Boscombe Athletic; Bacon against Gillingham; Regis against Chester City
