= List of Coventry City F.C. records and statistics =

This is a list of records and statistics for Coventry City F.C., an English professional association football club based in Coventry. The club was founded as Singers F.C. in 1883 and turned professional in 1893, before joining the Football League in 1920. In 1898 the club was renamed Coventry City. Coventry City currently play in the EFL Championship, the second tier of English football. They were relegated out of the top tier for the first time in 34 years in 2001.

This list encompasses the major honours won by Coventry City and records set by the club, their managers and their players. The player records section includes details of the club's leading goalscorers and those who have made most appearances in first-team competitions. It also records notable achievements by Coventry City players on the international stage, and the highest transfer fees paid and received by the club. The club's attendance records, both at Ricoh Arena, their home since 2005, and Highfield Road, their home from 1899 to 2005, are also included in the list.

== Team records ==
=== Highest achievement per competition ===
League

Competition	Season(s)	Achievement
Level 1	1969–70 First Division	6th
Level 2	1966–67 Second Division; 2025–26 Championship	1st
Level 3	1935–36 Third Division South; 1963–64 Third Division; 2019–20 League One	1st
Level 4	1958–59 Fourth Division	2nd

Domestic cups

Competition	Season(s)	Achievement
FA Cup	1986–87 FA Cup	Winners
FA Community Shield	1987 FA Charity Shield	Runners-up
EFL Cup	1980–81 Football League Cup; 1989–90 Littlewoods Challenge Cup	Semi-finals
EFL Trophy	2016–17 EFL Trophy	Winners
Full Members' Cup	1987–88 Full Members' Cup	Semi-finals
Football League Third Division South Cup	1935–36 Third Division South Cup	Winners
Southern Professional Floodlit Cup	1959–60 Southern Professional Floodlit Cup	Winners
Birmingham Senior Cup	1910–11 Birmingham Senior Cup; 1922–23 Birmingham Senior Cup; 2006–07 Birmingham Senior Cup	Winners
FA Youth Cup	1986–87 FA Youth Cup	Winners

European cups

Competition	Season(s)	Achievement
UEFA Champions League	n/a	Never qualified
UEFA Europa League	n/a	Never qualified
UEFA Conference League	n/a	Never qualified
UEFA Cup Winners' Cup	1987–88 European Cup Winners' Cup	Qualified (not allowed to compete)
Inter-Cities Fairs Cup	1970–71 Inter-Cities Fairs Cup	2nd round
Texaco Cup	1971–72 Texaco Cup	Quarter-finals

=== Record wins, draws and defeats ===
Competition	Record win	Record draw	Record defeat
League	9–0 vs Bristol City, 28 April 1934; 1933–34 Football League Third Division South	5–5 vs Fulham, 2 January 1932; 1931–32 Football League Third Division South; 5–5 vs Southampton, 4 May 1982; 1981–82 Football League First Division	2–10 vs Norwich City, 13 March 1930; 1929–30 Football League Third Division South
FA Cup	7–0 vs Macclesfield Town, 2 January 1999; 1998–99 FA Cup 3rd round	3–3 vs Norwich City, 30 November 1929; 1929–30 FA Cup 1st round 3–3 vs Reading, 15 December 1932; 1932–33 FA Cup 2nd round replay 3–3 vs Huddersfield Town, 8 January 1955; 1954–55 FA Cup 3rd round 3–3 vs Bristol City, 6 January 2007; 2006–07 FA Cup 3rd round 3–3 vs Manchester United, 21 April 2024; 2023–24 FA Cup semi-final	2–11 vs Berwick Rangers, 2 November 1901; 1901–02 FA Cup 3rd qualifying round
EFL Cup	8–0 vs Rushden & Diamonds, 2 October 2002; 2002–03 Football League Cup 2nd round	2–2 vs Swindon Town, 16 October 1968; 1968–69 Football League Cup 4th round 2–2 vs Bristol City, 30 October 1973; 1973–74 Football League Cup 3rd round 2–2 vs Manchester City, 19 December 1973; 1973–74 Football League Cup 5th round 2–2 vs Liverpool, 29 November 1977; 1977–78 Football League Cup 4th round 2–2 vs Watford, 2 December 1980; 1980–81 Football League Cup 5th round 2–2 vs Fulham, 5 October 1982; 1982–83 Football League Cup 2nd round 2–2 vs Gillingham, 22 October 1996; 1996–97 Football League Cup 3rd round 2–2 vs Peterborough United, 11 September 2001; 2001–02 Football League Cup 2nd round	1–8 vs Leicester City, 1 December 1964; 1964–65 Football League Cup 5th round
EFL Trophy	4–0 vs York City, 9 October 2012; 2012–13 Football League Trophy 2nd round	2–2 vs Walsall, 3 October 2017; 2017–18 EFL Trophy group stage	0–3 vs Crewe Alexandra, 5 February 2013; 2012–13 Football League Trophy semi-final 0–3 vs Arsenal Academy, 12 September 2018; 2018–19 EFL Trophy group stage
European cups	4–1 vs Trakia Plovdiv, 16 September 1970; 1970–71 Inter-Cities Fairs Cup 1st round	3–3 vs Motherwell, 12 September 1972; 1972–73 Texaco Cup 1st round	1–6 vs Bayern Munich, 20 October 1970; 1970–71 Inter-Cities Fairs Cup 2nd round

=== Record league sequences ===
Record	Details
Longest unbeaten run	25 matches (26 November 1966 – 13 May 1967)
Longest winning streak	6 matches (20 April 1954 – 28 August 1954); 6 matches (25 April 1964 – 5 September 1964); 6 matches (27 September 2025 – 25 October 2025); 6 matches (16 February 2026 – 11 March 2026)
Longest drawing streak	6 matches (28 September 1996 – 16 November 1996); 6 matches (1 November 2003 – 29 November 2003)
Longest losing streak	9 matches (30 August 1919 – 11 October 1919)
Longest winless streak	19 matches (30 August 1919 – 20 December 1919)
Longest scoring run	25 matches (10 September 1966 – 25 February 1967)
Longest non-scoring run	11 matches (11 October 1919 – 20 December 1919)
Longest clean-sheet run	6 matches (28 April 1934 – 3 September 1934)

=== Record season performances ===
Wins

Description	Season(s)	Record
Most wins in a league season	2025–26 Championship	28
Fewest wins in a league season	1995–96 Premier League; 2000–01 Premier League	8

Draws

Description	Season(s)	Record
Most draws in a league season	1962–63 Football League Third Division	17
Fewest draws in a league season	1984–85 Football League First Division	5

Defeats

Description	Season(s)	Record
Most defeats in a league season	2016–17 EFL League One	25
Fewest defeats in a league season	2019–20 EFL League One*; 1966–67 Football League Second Division	3*; 6

* Season concluded with 10 games remaining due to the COVID-19 pandemic.

Points

Description	Variant	Season(s)	Record
Most points in a season	Two points for a win	1958–59 Football League Fourth Division (in 46 matches); 1963–64 Football League Third Division (in 46 matches)	60
Most points in a season	Three points for a win	2025–26 Championship (in 46 matches)	95
Fewest points in a season	Two points for a win	1919–20 Football League Second Division (in 42 matches)	29
Fewest points in a season	Three points for a win	2000–01 Premier League (in 38 matches)	34

=== Highest attendances ===
Stadium	Date	Competition	Opponents	Attendance	Ref.
Home at Highfield Road	29 April 1967	1966–67 Football League Second Division	Wolverhampton Wanderers	51,455	
Home at CBS Arena	11 April 2026	2025–26 EFL Championship	Sheffield Wednesday	31,647	
Home at Sixfields Stadium	26 December 2013	2013–14 Football League One	Peterborough United	4,905	
Home at St Andrew's	25 January 2020	2019–20 FA Cup 4th round	Birmingham City	21,193	
Wembley Stadium (1923)	16 May 1987	1987 FA Cup final	Tottenham Hotspur	96,000	
Wembley Stadium	27 May 2023	2023 EFL Championship play-off final	Luton Town	85,711	

=== Visits to the National Stadium ===
Stadium	Date	Competition	Opponents	Result	Manager(s)	Ref.
Wembley Stadium (1923)	16 May 1987	1987 FA Cup final	Tottenham Hotspur	✓ 3–2	John Sillett; George Curtis	
Wembley Stadium (1923)	1 August 1987	1987 FA Charity Shield	Everton	✗ 0–1	John Sillett	
Wembley Stadium	2 April 2017	2017 EFL Trophy final	Oxford United	✓ 2–1	Mark Robins	
Wembley Stadium	28 May 2018	2018 EFL League Two play-off final	Exeter City	✓ 3–1	Mark Robins	
Wembley Stadium	27 May 2023	2023 EFL Championship play-off final	Luton Town	✗ 1–1, pens 6–5	Mark Robins	
Wembley Stadium	21 April 2024	2023–24 FA Cup semi-final	Manchester United	✗ 3–3, pens 4–2	Mark Robins	

=== Penalty shoot-outs ===
Total 18
Wins 8
Losses 10

Date	Opponents	Result	Competition	Stadium	Manager	Goalkeeper	Ref.
2 March 1988	Reading	✗ 4–3	1987–88 Full Members' Cup semi-final	Elm Park	John Sillett	Steve Ogrizovic	
17 March 1998	Sheffield United	✗ 3–1	1997–98 FA Cup quarter-final replay	Bramall Lane	Gordon Strachan	Steve Ogrizovic	
11 September 2001	Peterborough United	✓ 4–2	2001–02 Football League Cup 2nd round	London Road Stadium	Roland Nilsson	Magnus Hedman	
4 September 2012	Burton Albion	✓ 10–9	2012–13 Football League Trophy 1st round	Ricoh Arena	Richard Shaw	Joe Murphy	
4 December 2012	Sheffield United	✓ 4–1	2012–13 Football League Trophy 3rd round	Ricoh Arena	Mark Robins	Joe Murphy	
8 October 2013	Leyton Orient	✗ 4–2	2013–14 Football League Trophy 2nd round	Brisbane Road	Steven Pressley	Joe Murphy	
11 August 2015	Rochdale	✗ 5–3	2015–16 Football League Cup 1st round	Spotland Stadium	Tony Mowbray	Reice Charles-Cook	
6 October 2015	Yeovil Town	✗ 4–3	2015–16 Football League Trophy 2nd round	Huish Park	Tony Mowbray	Reice Charles-Cook	
24 January 2017	Swansea City Academy	✓ 4–2	2016–17 EFL Trophy quarter-final	Liberty Stadium	Russell Slade	Reice Charles-Cook	
3 October 2017	Walsall	✓ 4–3	2017–18 EFL Trophy group stage	Bescot Stadium	Mark Robins	Liam O'Brien	
9 October 2018	Forest Green Rovers	✓ 4–2	2018–19 EFL Trophy group stage	Ricoh Arena	Mark Robins	Liam O'Brien	
3 September 2019	Walsall	✓ 5–4	2019–20 EFL Trophy group stage	St Andrew's	Mark Robins	Ben Wilson	
8 October 2019	Forest Green Rovers	✗ 8–7	2019–20 EFL Trophy group stage	The New Lawn	Mark Robins	Ben Wilson	
4 February 2020	Birmingham City	✗ 4–1	2019–20 FA Cup 4th round replay	St Andrew's	Mark Robins	Marko Maroši	
15 September 2020	Gillingham	✗ 5–4	2020–21 EFL Cup 2nd round	Priestfield Stadium	Mark Robins	Tom Billson	
27 May 2023	Luton Town	✗ 6–5	2023 EFL Championship play-off final	Wembley Stadium	Mark Robins	Ben Wilson	
21 April 2024	Manchester United	✗ 4–2	2023–24 FA Cup semi-final	Wembley Stadium	Mark Robins	Bradley Collins	
11 January 2025	Sheffield Wednesday	✓ 4–3	2024–25 FA Cup 3rd round	CBS Arena	Frank Lampard	Oliver Dovin	

=== All-time Premier League table (1992–date) ===
Correct as of the end of the 2022–23 Premier League season.

Coventry City were in this league from 1992 until their relegation in 2001.

Pos.	Club	Seasons	Pld	W	D	L	GF	GA	GD	Pts	PPG	1st	2nd	3rd	4th	5th	6th	7th	Debut	Since/Last App.	Relegated	Best Pos.
20	West Brom	13	494	117	139	238	510	772	−262	490	0.992								2002–03	2020–21	5	8
21	Stoke City	10	380	116	109	155	398	525	−127	457	1.203								2008–09	2017–18	1	9
22	Coventry City	9	354	99	112	143	387	490	−103	409	1.155								1992–93	2000–01	1	11
23	Norwich City	10	392	99	105	188	414	669	−255	402	1.026			1					1992–93	2021–22	6	3
24	Sheffield Wed	8	316	101	89	126	409	453	−44	392	1.241							3	1992–93	1999–2000	1	7

== Player records ==
=== Appearances ===
Record	Details
Oldest player to play in a first-team match	(England) Alf Wood, 43 years 207 days (vs Plymouth Argyle, 6 December 1958)
Youngest player to play in a first-team match	(England) Jonson Clarke-Harris, 16 years 21 days (substitute vs Morecambe, 10 August 2010)
Youngest player to start a first-team match	(England) Brian Hill, 16 years 273 days (vs Gillingham, 30 April 1958)
Most consecutive League appearances	(England) Steve Ogrizovic, 241 (August 1984–September 1989)

Most appearances (all competitions)

Correct as of match on 28 February 2026.

	Player	Position	Years	Appearances
1	(England) Steve Ogrizovic	GK	1984–2000	601
2	(England) George Curtis	DF	1955–1969	538
3	(England) Mick Coop	DF	1966–1981	492
4	(England) Brian Borrows	DF	1985–1997	477
5	(England) Bill Glazier	GK	1964–1975	395
6	(England) Mick Kearns	DF	1957–1968	382
7	(Republic of Ireland) Michael Doyle	MF	2003–2011, 2017–2019	380
8	(England) Richard Shaw	DF	1995–2006	362
9	(Scotland) Tommy Hutchison	MF	1972–1981	355
10	(England) George Mason	DF	1931–1952	350
11	(England) Roy Kirk	DF	1951–1960	345
12	(England) Trevor Peake	DF	1983–1991	336
13	(England) Frank Austin	DF	1950–1963	313
14	(England) Ron Farmer	MF	1958–1968	311
15	(England) Marcus Hall	DF	1994–2002, 2005–2010	308
16	(England) Peter Hill	FW	1948–1962	303
17	(England) Ernie Machin	MF	1963–1972	289
18	(England) Micky Gynn	MF	1983–1993	285
19	(England) Brian Hill	DF	1957–1971	284
20	(England) Cyrille Regis	FW	1984–1991	283
21	(England) Gary McSheffrey	FW	1998–2006, 2010–2013	281
22	(Scotland) Willie Carr	MF	1967–1975	280
23	(England) Dick Mason	DF	1946–1954	262
23	(Wales) Ronnie Rees	MF	1962–1968	262
25	(Northern Ireland) Dave Clements	MF	1964–1971	257
26	(England) Lloyd McGrath	MF	1982–1994	253
27	(England) Harry Roberts	DF	1974–1984	249
28	(England) Alf Wood	GK	1935–1951, 1955–1959	246
29	(England) William Lake	FW	1928–1939	245
30	(England) Clarrie Bourton	FW	1931–1937	241

=== Goals ===
Record	Details
Most goals by one player in a season	(England) Clarrie Bourton, 50 (1931–1932, 49 league, 1 FA Cup)
Most goals by one player in a game	(England) Arthur Bacon, 5 (vs Gillingham, 1933) (England) Clarrie Bourton, 5 (vs Bournemouth, 1931) (England) Cyrille Regis, 5 (vs Chester City, 1985) (England) Billy Smith, 5 (vs Brentford, 1911)
Most hat-tricks by one player	(England) Clarrie Bourton, 13
Most hat-tricks by one player in a season	(England) Clarrie Bourton, 7 (1931–1932)
Goals in consecutive league matches	(England) Clarrie Bourton, 10 consecutive matches (September 1931–November 1931)
Top-flight era top scorer (all competitions)	(England) Dion Dublin, 72 goals (1994–1998)
Top-flight era top scorer (league)	(England) Dion Dublin, 60 goals (1994–1998)
Most goals by one player in a season in top-flight	(England) Dion Dublin, 23 (1997–1998) (Scotland) Ian Wallace, 23 (1977–1978)
Fastest goal	(England) Eddie Brown (12 seconds vs Reading, 23 August 1954) (England) Gary McSheffrey (12 seconds vs Colchester, 11 September 2002)
Last goal at Highfield Road	(England) Andy Whing
First goal at Ricoh Arena	(Faroe Islands) Claus Bech Jørgensen

Most goals (all competitions)

Correct as of match on 21 April 2026.

	Name	Position	Years	Goals scored
1	(England) Clarrie Bourton	FW	1931–1937	182
2	(England) William Lake	FW	1928–1939	123
3	(England) Ted Roberts	FW	1936–1952	87
4	(England) Fred Herbert	FW	1922–1929	85
4	(England) Ray Straw	FW	1957–1961	85
6	(England) Peter Hill	FW	1948–1962	77
7	(England) George Hudson	FW	1962–1966	75
8	(Wales) Leslie Jones	FW	1934–1937	73
9	(England) Dion Dublin	FW	1994–1998	72
9	(England) Gary McSheffrey	FW	1998–2006, 2010–2013	72
11	(Scotland) Jock Lauderdale	FW	1931–1937	63
12	(England) Cyrille Regis	FW	1984–1991	62
13	(Scotland) Ian Wallace	FW	1976–1980	60
14	(Wales) George Lowrie	FW	1939–1948, 1952–1953	59
15	(England) Mick Ferguson	FW	1971–1981, 1984	57
16	(England) Ron Farmer	MF	1958–1968	52
16	(England) Terry Gibson	FW	1983–1986	52
16	(Wales) Ronnie Rees	MF	1962–1968	52
19	(England) Eddy Brown	FW	1952–1954	51
19	(England) Ernie Hunt	FW	1968–1973	51
21	(England) Matt Godden	FW	2019–2024	50
22	(England) Garry Thompson	FW	1977–1983	49
22	(United States) Haji Wright	FW	2023–	49
24	(Northern Ireland) Harold Redmond Buckle	MF	1908–1911	46
25	(Scotland) Neil Martin	FW	1968–1971	45
26	(Northern Ireland) Norman Lockhart	FW	1947–1952	44
27	(England) Micky Gynn	MF	1983–1993	43
27	(Sweden) Viktor Gyökeres	FW	2021–2023	43
27	(Zimbabwe) Peter Ndlovu	FW	1991–1997	43
30	(England) Bobby Gould	FW	1963–1968	42

Goals scored by goalkeepers

Date	Player	Opponents	Stadium	Result	Details
25 October 1986	(England) Steve Ogrizovic	Sheffield Wednesday	Hillsborough Stadium	2–2	A long kick from the penalty area at the opposite end (63 min)
19 April 2023	(England) Ben Wilson	Blackburn Rovers	Ewood Park	1–1	Scored in the penalty area, assisted from a corner (90+5 min)

=== Internationals ===
Record	Details
Most international caps while a Coventry City player	Magnus Hedman (44, for Sweden, 1997–2002)
Most international goals while a Coventry City player	(Trinidad and Tobago) Stern John (13, for Trinidad & Tobago, 2004–2007)
First Coventry City player to appear at a World Cup	Tommy Hutchison (for Scotland at 1974 World Cup)

=== Transfers in ===
Correct as of 4 September 2026.

Highest transfer fees paid

The club's record signing came in August 2026, when they signed Caleb Yirenkyi from Nordsjælland for £23.1 million. This surpassed records during the same summer transfer window for Carl Rushworth (£22.5 million in August 2026) and Loum Tchaouna (£20.0 million in July 2026). The previous record signing was for Haji Wright (£7.7 million in August 2023), then 23 years earlier for Craig Bellamy (£6.5 million in August 2000), and for Robbie Keane (£6.0 million in August 1999), which made Keane the most expensive teenager in British football at the time.

	Player	Position	From	Date	Fee
1	(Ghana) Caleb Yirenkyi	MF	(Denmark) Nordsjælland	5 August 2026	£23,100,000
2	(England) Carl Rushworth	GK	(England) Brighton & Hove Albion	4 August 2026	£22,500,000
3	(Guinea) Sidiki Cherif	FW	(Turkey) Fenerbahçe	19 August 2026	£20,500,000
4	(France) Loum Tchaouna	MF	(England) Burnley	11 July 2026	£20,000,000
5	(Switzerland) Aurèle Amenda	DF	(Germany) Eintracht Frankfurt	16 July 2026	£15,400,000
6	(Ivory Coast) Yann Gboho	MF	(France) Toulouse	4 September 2026	£10,300,000
7	(Nigeria) Taiwo Awoniyi	FW	(England) Nottingham Forest	17 August 2026	£9,000,000
8	(United States) Haji Wright	FW	(Turkey) Antalyaspor	4 August 2023	£7,700,000
9	(Nigeria) Frank Onyeka	MF	(England) Brentford	29 June 2026	£6,800,000
10	(Wales) Craig Bellamy	FW	(England) Norwich City	17 August 2000	£6,500,000
11	(Netherlands) Gustavo Hamer (2)	MF	(England) Sheffield United	11 August 2026	£6,000,000
11	(Republic of Ireland) Robbie Keane	FW	(England) Wolverhampton Wanderers	18 August 1999	£6,000,000
13	(England) Lee Hughes	FW	(England) West Bromwich Albion	8 August 2001	£5,000,001
14	(Jamaica) Ethan Pinnock	DF	(England) Brentford	26 August 2026	£5,000,000
14	(England) Jack Rudoni	MF	(England) Huddersfield Town	20 June 2024	£5,000,000
16	(England) Ephron Mason-Clark	MF	(England) Peterborough United	1 February 2024	£4,250,000
17	(Morocco) Mustapha Hadji	MF	(Spain) Deportivo La Coruña	19 July 1999	£4,000,000
17	(England) Liam Kitching	DF	(England) Barnsley	1 September 2023	£4,000,000
17	(England) Luke Woolfenden	DF	(England) Ipswich Town	1 September 2025	£4,000,000
20	(England) Matt Grimes	MF	(Wales) Swansea City	31 January 2025	£3,750,000
21	(England) Kaine Kesler-Hayden	DF	(England) Aston Villa	1 July 2025	£3,500,000
21	(England) Ellis Simms	FW	(England) Everton	7 July 2023	£3,500,000
23	(Netherlands) Milan van Ewijk	DF	(Netherlands) Heerenveen	27 July 2023	£3,400,000
24	(Romania) Viorel Moldovan	FW	(Switzerland) Grasshoppers	2 January 1998	£3,250,000
25	(Scotland) Gary McAllister	MF	(England) Leeds United	26 July 1996	£3,000,000
26	(Croatia) Robert Jarni	DF	(Spain) Real Betis	1 August 1998	£2,600,000
27	(Republic of Ireland) Gary Breen	DF	(England) Birmingham City	1 January 1998	£2,500,000
27	(Republic of Ireland) Lee Carsley	MF	(England) Blackburn Rovers	1 January 2001	£2,500,000
27	(England) David Thompson	MF	(England) Liverpool	2 August 2000	£2,500,000
30	(Ghana) Brandon Thomas-Asante	FW	(England) West Bromwich Albion	1 August 2024	£2,250,000
31	(Denmark) Victor Torp	MF	(Norway) Sarpsborg	11 January 2024	£2,150,000
32	(Italy) Stefano Gioacchini	FW	(Italy) Venezia	26 July 1999	£2,000,000
32	(Scotland) Eoin Jess	MF	(Scotland) Aberdeen	23 February 1996	£2,000,000
32	(Bosnia and Herzegovina) Muhamed Konjić	DF	(France) AS Monaco	13 January 1999	£2,000,000
32	(England) Bobby Thomas	DF	(England) Burnley	22 July 2023	£2,000,000
32	(England) Noel Whelan	FW	(England) Leeds United	16 December 1995	£2,000,000
37	(England) Dion Dublin	FW	(England) Manchester United	1 September 1994	£1,950,000
38	(England) Steve Froggatt	MF	(England) Wolverhampton Wanderers	1 October 1998	£1,900,000
39	(England) Luis Binks	DF	(Italy) Bologna	19 June 2024	£1,700,000
40	(Republic of Ireland) Liam Daish	DF	(England) Birmingham City	12 February 1996	£1,500,000
40	(England) John Salako	MF	(England) Crystal Palace	3 August 1995	£1,500,000
42	(Netherlands) Gustavo Hamer (1)	MF	(Netherlands) PEC Zwolle	3 July 2020	£1,350,000
43	(Belgium) Laurent Delorge	DF	(Belgium) K.A.A. Gent	12 October 1998	£1,250,000
44	(Morocco) Youssef Chippo	MF	(Portugal) FC Porto	28 May 1999	£1,200,000
44	(Wales) Freddy Eastwood	FW	(England) Wolverhampton Wanderers	12 July 2008	£1,200,000
44	(England) Marc Edworthy	DF	(England) Crystal Palace	26 August 1998	£1,200,000
44	(Belgium) Cédric Roussel	FW	(Belgium) K.A.A. Gent	20 January 2000	£1,200,000
44	(Japan) Tatsuhiro Sakamoto	MF	(Belgium) KV Oostende	10 July 2023	£1,200,000

Progression of record fee paid

Date	Player	Bought from	Fee
1919	(Scotland) George Chaplin	(England) Bradford City	£500
1919	(England) Ted Hanney	(England) Manchester City	£1,100
1926	(Scotland) Jock Ramage	(Scotland) Hearts	£1,200
1928	(England) Billy Kirton	(England) Aston Villa	£1,700
1936	(England) Jack Astley	(England) Brentford	£2,000
1936	(Northern Ireland) Jackie Brown	(England) Wolverhampton Wanderers	£3,000
1938	(England) George Ashall	(England) Wolverhampton Wanderers	£3,500
1947	(Wales) Don Dearson	(England) Birmingham City	£6,000
1947	(Northern Ireland) Norman Lockhart	(Wales) Swansea City	£7,000
1948	(England) Jack Marsh	(England) Notts County	£8,000
1949	(England) Martin McDonnell	(England) Birmingham City	£10,000
1950	(England) Tommy Briggs	(England) Grimsby Town	£20,000
April 1963	(England) George Hudson	(England) Peterborough United	£21,000
October 1964	(England) Bill Glazier	(England) Crystal Palace	£35,000
August 1966	(Scotland) Ian Gibson	(England) Middlesbrough	£57,500
February 1968	(Scotland) Neil Martin	(England) Sunderland	£90,000
August 1970	(England) Wilf Smith	(England) Sheffield Wednesday	£100,000
October 1972	(Scotland) Colin Stein	(Scotland) Rangers	£140,000
October 1972	(Scotland) Tommy Hutchison	(England) Blackpool	£140,000
November 1973	(England) David Cross	(England) Norwich City	£150,000
August 1974	(England) Larry Lloyd	(England) Liverpool	£240,000
July 1979	(England) Dave Jones	(England) Everton	£250,000
July 1979	(England) Gary Collier	(England) Bristol City	£325,000
July 1987	(Scotland) David Speedie	(England) Chelsea	£780,000
October 1989	(England) Kevin Drinkell	(Scotland) Rangers	£800,000
January 1990	(Scotland) Kevin Gallacher	(Scotland) Dundee United	£900,000
September 1994	(England) Dion Dublin	(England) Manchester United	£1,950,000
December 1995	(England) Noel Whelan	(England) Leeds United	£2,000,000
July 1996	(Scotland) Gary McAllister	(England) Leeds United	£3,000,000
January 1998	(Romania) Viorel Moldovan	(Switzerland) Grasshoppers	£3,250,000
July 1999	(Morocco) Mustapha Hadji	(Spain) Deportivo La Coruña	£4,000,000
August 1999	(Republic of Ireland) Robbie Keane	(England) Wolverhampton Wanderers	£6,000,000
August 2000	(Wales) Craig Bellamy	(England) Norwich City	£6,500,000
August 2023	(United States) Haji Wright	(Turkey) Antalyaspor	£7,700,000
July 2026	(France) Loum Tchaouna	(England) Burnley	£20,000,000
August 2026	(England) Carl Rushworth	(England) Brighton & Hove Albion	£22,500,000
August 2026	(Ghana) Caleb Yirenkyi	(Denmark) Nordsjælland	£23,100,000

=== Transfers out ===
Correct as of 8 August 2026.

Highest transfer fees received

The club's record sale came in July 2023, when they sold Viktor Gyökeres to Sporting CP for £20.5 million, which eclipsed the previous record in August 2000 of Robbie Keane to Inter Milan for £13 million. The sale of Chris Kirkland to Liverpool for £6 million in 2001 set a British record transfer fee for a goalkeeper and the sale of Phil Babb also to Liverpool in 1994 set a British record transfer fee for a defender.

	Player	Position	To	Date	Fee
1	(Sweden) Viktor Gyökeres	FW	(Portugal) Sporting CP	13 July 2023	£20,500,000
2	(Netherlands) Gustavo Hamer	MF	(England) Sheffield United	12 August 2023	£15,000,000
3	(Republic of Ireland) Robbie Keane	FW	(Italy) Internazionale	1 August 2000	£13,000,000
4	(England) Ben Sheaf	MF	(Wales) Wrexham	1 September 2025	£6,500,000
5	(Wales) Craig Bellamy	FW	(England) Newcastle United	25 June 2001	£6,000,000
5	(Wales) John Hartson	FW	(Scotland) Celtic	2 August 2001	£6,000,000
5	(England) Chris Kirkland	GK	(England) Liverpool	31 August 2001	£6,000,000
8	(England) Dion Dublin	FW	(England) Aston Villa	5 November 1998	£5,750,000
9	(Netherlands) George Boateng	MF	(England) Aston Villa	20 July 1999	£4,500,000
10	(Suriname) Jahnoah Markelo	MF	(United Arab Emirates) Shabab Al Ahli	8 August 2026	£4,400,000
11	(England) Darren Huckerby	FW	(England) Leeds United	11 August 1999	£4,000,000
11	(England) Gary McSheffrey	FW	(England) Birmingham City	16 August 2006	£4,000,000
11	(Romania) Viorel Moldovan	FW	(Turkey) Fenerbahçe	16 July 1998	£4,000,000
14	(Republic of Ireland) Phil Babb	DF	(England) Liverpool	1 September 1994	£3,600,000
15	(England) Scott Dann	DF	(England) Birmingham City	12 June 2009	£3,500,000
16	(Croatia) Robert Jarni	DF	(Spain) Real Madrid	15 August 1998	£3,400,000
17	(England) James Maddison	MF	(England) Norwich City	1 February 2016	£3,000,000
17	(England) Callum Wilson	FW	(England) Bournemouth	4 July 2014	£3,000,000
19	(England) Luis Binks	DF	(Denmark) Brøndby IF	29 July 2025	£2,500,000
19	(Morocco) Mustapha Hadji	MF	(England) Aston Villa	6 July 2001	£2,500,000
19	(England) Lee Hughes	FW	(England) West Bromwich Albion	29 August 2002	£2,500,000
19	(England) Sam McCallum	DF	(England) Norwich City	31 January 2020	£2,500,000
23	(England) Noel Whelan	FW	(England) Middlesbrough	31 July 2000	£2,200,000
24	(Republic of Ireland) Lee Carsley	MF	(England) Everton	8 February 2002	£1,900,000
25	(England) Tom Bayliss	MF	(England) Preston North End	2 August 2019	£1,600,000
25	(England) Cyrus Christie	DF	(England) Derby County	1 July 2014	£1,600,000
25	(Zimbabwe) Peter Ndlovu	FW	(England) Birmingham City	14 July 1997	£1,600,000

Progression of record fee received

Date	Player	Sold to	Fee
October 1912	(England) Eli Bradley	(Scotland) Heart of Midlothian	£500
November 1927	(England) Jack Randle	(England) Birmingham	£1,200
March 1929	(England) Ernie Toseland	(England) Manchester City	£3,000
October 1937	(England) Clarrie Bourton	(England) Plymouth Argyle	£3,000
October 1937	(Wales) Leslie Jones	(England) Arsenal	£6,000
June 1948	(Wales) George Lowrie	(England) Newcastle United	£18,500
June 1950	(England) Peter Murphy	(England) Tottenham Hotspur	£20,000
October 1956	(England) Reg Matthews	(England) Chelsea	£22,500
March 1966	(England) George Hudson	(England) Northampton Town	£29,000
May 1966	(England) Allan Harris	(England) Chelsea	£45,000
February 1968	(England) Bobby Gould	(England) Arsenal	£90,000
October 1972	(England) Jeff Blockley	(England) Arsenal	£200,000
August 1979	(Wales) Terry Yorath	(England) Tottenham Hotspur	£300,000
October 1979	(England) Barry Powell	(England) Derby County	£350,000
March 1980	(England) Gary Collier	(United States) Portland Timbers	£365,000
July 1980	(Scotland) Ian Wallace	(England) Nottingham Forest	£1,250,000
March 1993	(Scotland) Kevin Gallacher	(England) Blackburn Rovers	£1,500,000
September 1994	(Republic of Ireland) Phil Babb	(England) Liverpool	£3,600,000
July 1998	(Romania) Viorel Moldovan	(Turkey) Fenerbahçe	£4,000,000
November 1998	(England) Dion Dublin	(England) Aston Villa	£5,750,000
August 2000	(Republic of Ireland) Robbie Keane	(Italy) Internazionale	£13,000,000
July 2023	(Sweden) Viktor Gyökeres	(Portugal) Sporting CP	£20,500,000

== Managerial records ==
Record	Details
First manager	(England) William Stanley (1883–1885)
Longest-serving manager	(England) Harry Storer, 19 years, 1 month (between 1931–1945 and 1948–1953)
Most matches as manager	(England) Harry Storer, 584 (between 1931–1945 and 1948–1953)
Most wins as manager	(England) Harry Storer, 255 (between 1931–1945 and 1948–1953)
Most league titles as manager	(England) Jimmy Hill, 2 (1963–64 Third Division and 1966–67 Second Division)
Most league promotions as manager	(England) Jimmy Hill, 2 (1963–64 Third Division and 1966–67 Second Division) (England) Mark Robins, 2 (2017–18 EFL League Two and 2019–20 EFL League One)
Most trophies as manager	(England) Mark Robins, 3 (2016–17 EFL Trophy, 2017–18 EFL League Two play-off and 2019–20 EFL League One)
Most wins at Wembley Stadium as manager	(England) Mark Robins, 2 (2017 EFL Trophy Final, 2018 EFL League Two play-off final)
Most matches in Europe as manager	(Republic of Ireland) Noel Cantwell, 4 (1970–71 Inter-Cities Fairs Cup)
