= 1933 in association football =

The following are the football (soccer) events of the year 1933 throughout the world.

== Winners club national championship ==
- Argentina: San Lorenzo
- England: Arsenal F.C.
- France: FC Sète
- Germany: Fortuna Düsseldorf
- Hungary: Újpest FC
- Italy: Juventus FC
- Poland: Ruch Chorzów
- Scotland:
  - Division One: Rangers F.C.
  - Scottish Cup: Celtic F.C.
- Romania: Ripensia Timișoara
- Spain: Real Madrid
- Turkey: Fenerbahçe

== International tournaments ==
- 1933 British Home Championship (17 September 1932 – 1 April 1933)

Wales

== Births ==
- January 18: Mike Phillips, Scottish professional footballer (died 2020)
- January 19: John Abthorpe, English professional footballer (died 2005)
- April 5: Feridun Buğeker, Turkish international footballer (died 2014)
- May 5: Hans van der Hoek, Dutch international footballer (died 2017)
- May 15: Peter Broadbent, English international footballer (died 2013)
- May 22: Attilio Galassini, Italian footballer (died 2002)
- June 2: Roy Littlejohn, English former footballer
- June 5: Ron Tulloch, Scottish professional footballer
- July 1:
  - Radivoje Ognjanović, Serbian football player and manager (died 2011)
  - Hamza Qasim, Iraqi football goalkeeper
- July 6: Frank Austin, English footballer (died 2004)
- July 9: John Devine, English footballer (died 2017)
- July 13:
  - Alessandro Bazzoni, former Italian footballer
  - Ceninho (Avâtenio Antônio da Costa), former Brazilian footballer
- August 6: Ulrich Biesinger German international footballer (died 2011)
- August 18: Just Fontaine, French international footballer
- September 11: Amby Fogarty, Irish international footballer (died 2016)
- September 12: Len Allchurch, Welsh international footballer (died 2016)
- September 22: Carmelo Simeone, Argentine international footballer (died 2014)
- October 7: Henryk Szczepański, Polish international footballer (died 2015)
- October 10: Giuliano Sarti, Italian international footballer (died 2017)
- October 26: Raúl Sánchez, Chilean international footballer (died 2016)
- November 1: Walter Lord, English former professional footballer (died 2022)
- November 15: George Trewick, English footballer (died 2003)
- November 19: Nicolae Rainea, Romanian football referee (died 2015)
- November 20: Jesús Ares, former Spanish footballer
- December 13: Jimmy Ashall, English former footballer
