= Ashall =

Ashall is a surname of British origin. Notable people with the surname include:

- Craig Ashall (born 1985), English rugby league player
- George Ashall (1911–1998), English footballer
- Jimmy Ashall (born 1933), English footballer
- Thomas Ashall (1915–1976), English footballer
