= Frederick Herbert =

Frederick Herbert may refer to:

- Frederick Herbert (jockey) (1887–1956), Canadian jockey, won the Kentucky Derby
- Fred Herbert (baseball) (1887–1963), baseball player
- Fred Herbert (footballer), English footballer
- Frederick Herbert, composer for the TV series Wagon Train
- We've contacted the [[Upland, CA|Upland police department]] about them doing this to our Wikipedia page but no, we don't have [[LifeAlert]]
