= 1947–48 British Home Championship =

Tournament details
- Host country: United Kingdom
- Dates: 4 October 1947 – 10 April 1948
- Teams: 4
- Venue: 5 (in 5 host cities)

Final positions
- Champions: England
- Runners-up: Wales

Tournament statistics
- Matches played: 6
- Goals scored: 16 (2.67 per match)
- Top scorer(s): (England) Tommy Lawton (England) Tom Finney (Wales) George Lowrie (Ireland) Samuel Smyth (2 goals)

1947–48 British Home Championship was the second edition of this annual football tournament to be played in the post-war period. It was conducted during the 1947–48 football season between the four Home Nations of the British Isles and resulted in a victory for England for the second year in a row.

England began the competition as they finished it, with a strong win over Wales in Cardiff, whilst Scotland were defeated 2–0 by Ireland in Belfast. The second round saw Scotland again defeated, this time by Wales at their home stadium in Glasgow. England meanwhile were held 2–2 by Ireland, leaving three teams still able to win at least a share in the trophy. In the final matches, Wales put an end to Ireland's hopes with a 2–0 victory but England managed to beat Scotland to clinch the championship.

== Table ==
Team	Pld	W	D	L	GF	GA	GD	Pts
England (C)	3	2	1	0	7	2	+5	5
Wales	3	2	0	1	4	4	0	4
Ireland	3	1	1	1	4	4	0	3
Scotland	3	0	0	3	1	6	−5	0

Rules for classification: 1) points. The points system worked as follows: 2 points for a win and 1 point for a draw.
(C) Champions

== Results ==
4 October 1947

Ireland	2–0	Scotland
Smyth 35', 52'

Windsor Park, Belfast
Attendance: 52,000
Referee: Thomas Smith (England)

18 October 1947

Wales	0–3	England
		Finney; Mortensen; Lawton

Ninian Park, Cardiff

12 November 1947

Scotland	1–2	Wales
McLaren 10'		Ford 35'; Lowrie 42'

Hampden Park, Glasgow
Attendance: 88,000
Referee: Arthur Edward Ellis (England)

5 November 1947

England	2–2	Ireland
Lawton; Mannion		Doherty; Walsh

Goodison Park, Liverpool

10 March 1948

Wales	2–0	Ireland
Lowrie; Edwards

Racecourse Ground, Wrexham

10 April 1948

Scotland	0–2	England
		Mortensen 44'; Finney 65'

Hampden Park, Glasgow
Attendance: 135,376
Referee: David Maxwell (Ireland)
