= Peter Hodgkinson (sculptor) =

British sculptor, born 1956 in Preston (born 1956)

- Born: 1956 (age 69–70); Preston, Lancashire
- Known for: Sculpture
- Notable work: Bronze statues

Peter Hodgkinson is a British sculptor, born 1956 in Preston.

Among his commissions are statues of L S Lowry in Sam's Chop House, off Cross Street, Manchester, and the footballers Tom Finney and Stan Mortensen.

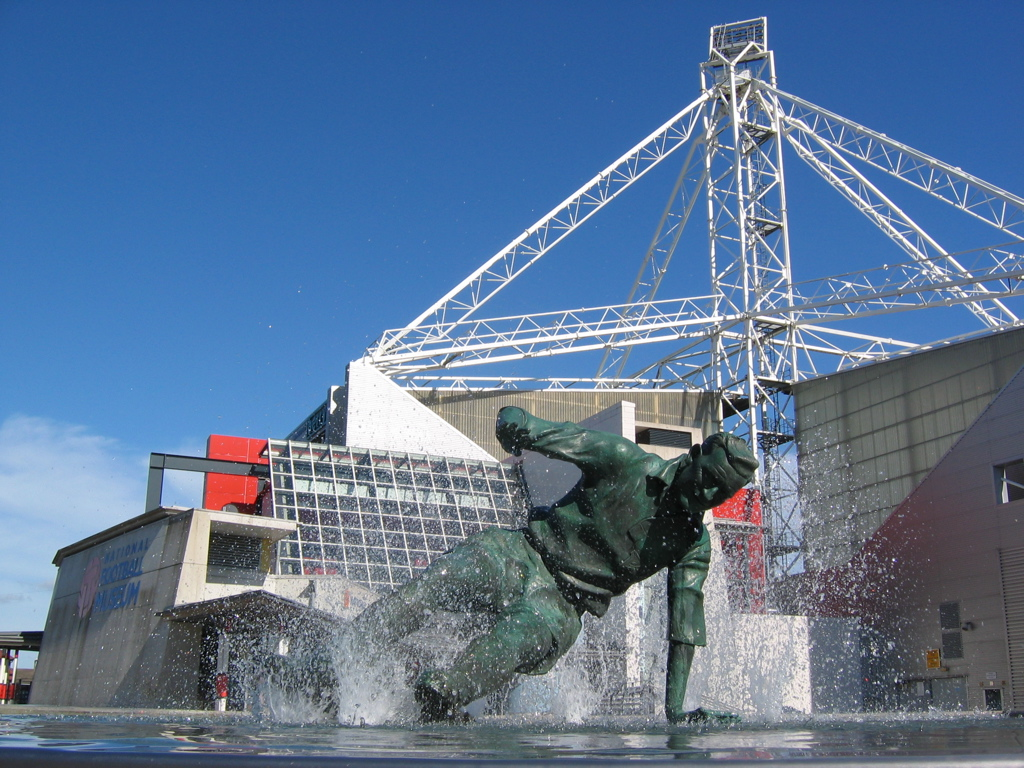
Hodgkinson's statue of Tom Finney
