= Tom Finney =

English international footballer (1922–2014)

Sir Tom Finney CBE
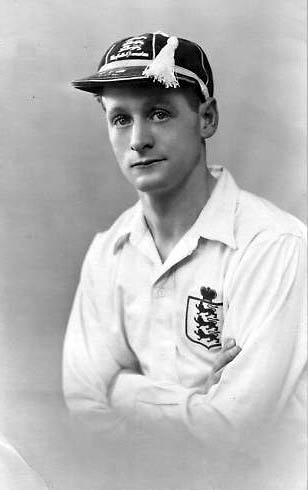
- Finney with the England national team c. 1950

Personal information
- Full name: Thomas Finney
- Date of birth: 5 April 1922
- Place of birth: Preston, England
- Date of death: 14 February 2014 (aged 91)
- Place of death: Preston, England
- Height: 1.72 m (5 ft 8 in)
- Position: Outside left

Youth career
- 1940: Preston North End

Senior career*
Years	Team	Apps	(Gls)
1940–1960	Preston North End	433	(187)
1962	Toronto City	1	(1)
1963	Distillery	0	(0)
Total		434	(188)

International career
1948	England B	1	(0)
1946–1958	England	76	(30)
- * Club domestic league appearances and goals

Sir Thomas Finney (5 April 1922 – 14 February 2014) was an English international footballer who played from 1946 to 1960 as an outside left for Preston North End and England. He is widely acknowledged to have been one of England's greatest ever players. He was noted for his loyalty to Preston, for whom he made 433 Football League and 39 FA Cup appearances, scoring a total of 210 goals. He played for England 76 times, scoring 30 goals.

== Early life ==
Finney was born on 5 April 1922 at his parents' home on St Michael's Road, Preston, Lancashire, a few hundred yards from Deepdale stadium, the home of Preston North End. His parents were Maggie (née Mitchell) and Alf Finney. He had an elder brother called Joe and four sisters called Madge, Peggy, Doris and Edith. Alf was a clerical worker in local government who sometimes found himself unemployed on account of the changing economic climate. When Tom was very young, the family moved to Daisy Lane in the Holme Slack area of Preston. They were struck by tragedy in 1927 when Maggie was suddenly taken ill and died, aged 32. Alf managed to keep the family together with the help of relations and neighbours.

Inspired by his father, who was a keen football fan, Finney played the game from a very early age both at school and in the fields near his home. His ambition was always to become a professional footballer but he was somewhat frail and sickly in his youth and stood only 4 ft 9 in (1.45 m) when he left school in 1936 at the age of fourteen. He became an apprentice for a local plumbing company called Pilkington's.

The following year, Finney saw an advert placed by Preston North End in the local newspaper for junior players aged fourteen to eighteen. He asked his father to help him get a trial. His father met Preston trainer Will Scott and it was arranged. Finney had an outstanding match in the trial and was immediately offered a contract at the wage of £2 10s a week. He went home to get his father's approval but Alf Finney refused, insisting that he must first complete his apprenticeship before signing professional terms. Preston were nevertheless happy with this and Finney joined them as an amateur, doing his training in the evenings after work and eligible to play for the club's junior teams.

Largely inspired by Bill Shankly, who was a first team regular, and helped by Scott, Finney worked hard in training and began to enhance his skills and technique. He later described Shankly as his "football mentor". Finney soon won a place in Preston's youth team, known as the B team, which won four trophies while he played for them. Although he was satisfied with plumbing as a full-time career, he set himself the goal of becoming a professional footballer and playing for the club's first team.

== Second World War ==
=== Turning professional ===
Finney was 17 when the Second World War began in September 1939. His elder brother Joe was playing for Netherfield and training with nearby Blackburn Rovers. Their father thought it would be sensible for both his sons to be at the same club. Finney had a trial for Netherfield at this time, but was rejected by the Kendal club. Almost 70 years later, Finney returned to the ground at Parkside Road, Kendal, as a guest of the club. The club's then chairman apologised to Finney on the pitch in front of 500 fans, describing Netherfield's decision as the "biggest mistake in football history".

In January 1940, Finney was about to join Rovers when he received a letter from North End which resulted in him signing on as a professional. He later recalled that he was signed on wartime terms of ten shillings a match.

First-class league and cup football had been suspended for the duration, but regional wartime competitions were organised as a boost to the people's morale. There were ten regional leagues in 1939–40 and Preston were in the North West League, finishing as runners-up to champions Bury. Finney continued to play youth team football through the season.

=== 1940–41 season ===
The number of leagues were reduced to two in 1940 and Preston joined the North Regional League (NRL) for the 1940–41 season, which began on Saturday 31 August 1940. They began their campaign with an away match against Liverpool at Anfield. Finney, now 18, made his first team debut playing on the right wing (wearing the no. 7 shirt). Five of his youth team colleagues, including Andy McLaren, also made their first team debuts. Played before an estimated 6,000 people, the result was a 3–3 draw after Preston led 3–2 at half-time. The Liverpool team included Bob Paisley, Billy Liddell and, playing as a guest, Stan Cullis. For military reasons, neither Matt Busby of Liverpool nor Bill Shankly of Preston were available. The Lancashire Evening Post praised Finney's performance as he was involved in creating two of the Preston goals and, but for a lucky save by Sam Bartram, would have scored the winning goal near the end of the match.

With Finney in the team, Preston went on to enjoy a successful season and won the NRL with 18 wins in the 29 matches they played. They also won the Football League War Cup, defeating Arsenal 2–1 in a replay at Ewood Park after the final at Wembley Stadium ended 1–1. There were 36 teams in the 1940–41 NRL – 34 in the South Regional League (SRL) – but, because of wartime demands limiting the availability of players and venues, fixtures were often unfulfilled. For example, Bury played the most matches (38) while their near neighbours Bolton Wanderers could only manage 16.

The War Cup began in February with ties played on a two-legged, home-and-away basis. Finney began with two goals at home against Bury, a match described as a thriller that ended 4–4. Preston won 2–1 in the second leg at Gigg Lane and then enjoyed convincing victories over Bolton Wanderers and Tranmere Rovers to reach the quarter finals. They defeated Manchester City 5–1 on aggregate but faced a tough semi-final tie against Newcastle United. Preston won the first leg at home 2–0 and held on for a 0–0 draw in the second at St James' Park. In one of his rare appearances that season, Bill Shankly scored both goals in the home leg.

The final at Wembley was the biggest event of Finney's career so far and he described the experience at some length in his autobiography. Playing on the right wing, he directly faced Eddie Hapgood, who was the England captain, and Finney said the prospect made him "feel quite weak at the knees". Because of wartime travel constraints, only a few hundred Preston fans were in the 60,000 crowd but among them were Finney's father and brother. Finney got the better of Hapgood to provide the assist for McLaren to score the opening goal. He says Preston should have made the most of their advantage but they failed to score from several good chances and Arsenal equalised with a goal by Denis Compton. The match ended 1–1 and Finney said the team were disappointed.

The Preston fans formed the majority of the crowd at the replay in Blackburn. Finney recalled that it was touch-and-go as to whether Bobby Beattie, their Scottish international inside forward would be able to play because of his RAF commitments. He had not arrived at Deepdale when the team set off for Blackburn and they were surprised to find him waiting at Ewood; he had gone straight there after getting a late release to play. Beattie scored both of their goals as they defeated Arsenal 2–1; Bernard Joy scored an equaliser for Arsenal after Beattie's first. Finney gave most of the credit to Beattie but both of the goals came from moves in which he was primarily involved. Finney recalled that, for winning the War Cup, each of the Preston players were awarded five wartime savings certificates with a value of fifteen shillings apiece. Having faced Finney twice, the experienced Hapgood said he was "amazed to see a right-winger dribbling so brilliantly with his left foot".

=== 1942–43 season ===
In December 1942, Finney made a guest appearance for Southampton in a 3–1 defeat by Arsenal at The Dell.

=== Service in Egypt and Italy ===
Aged 20, Finney was called up in April 1942 and assigned as a trooper to the Royal Armoured Corps.

He was sent to Egypt and served with Montgomery's Eighth Army. When on leave in North Africa, he was able to play for army football teams against local opposition. Many years later, he met the Egyptian film actor Omar Sharif, who told him that as a teenager he had been a substitute for one of the teams Finney played against, but he did not take part in the match.

In April 1945, Finney took part in the final offensive at the Battle of the Argenta Gap as a Stuart tank driver with the 9th Lancers.

== First-class playing career ==
=== Preston North End ===
==== League debut ====
League football resumed on Saturday 31 August 1946. Preston were in the First Division and began the new season with a home match against Leeds United. Playing on the right wing, Finney made his debut in a team that included Bill Shankly and Andy Beattie. The crowd was over 25,000 and, on what Finney called "a carnival sort of afternoon", Preston won 3–2. Finney said he was "lucky enough to score one of the goals" and his biographer Paul Agnew cites this as a typical example of Finney's modesty. Newspapers of the day reported that Preston's win was a "one-man show"; that Finney created all their goals; that Leeds would have won but for Finney; and that Finney's goal, Preston's second, was "a brilliant solo effort". Although this match was his league debut, he was by no means a newcomer to the team, and the local supporters knew from his wartime appearances that Finney was an outstanding prospect. It was not until he played league football that his genius as a player was fully recognised.

Finney went on to play for Preston in fourteen English league seasons from 1946–47 to 1959–60, including twelve in the First Division. He played in the Second Division for two seasons after Preston were relegated at the end of the 1948–49 season. In the Second Division, Preston finished sixth in 1949–50 and then won the division championship in 1950–51. The club was thereby promoted back to the First Division where they remained for ten years until the end of the 1960–61 season, the one following Finney's retirement. Preston's best league position during Finney's career was second in both the 1952–53 and 1957–58 seasons.

==== Second income ====
Post-war demand for plumbers ensured that Finney had a second income to supplement the £14 he received as a footballer. He became known as "The Preston Plumber" and ran his own successful building and plumbing business from the 1940s until the 1990s. The future Aston Villa chairman, Doug Ellis, had started working in a Preston travel agency and rented a third-floor flat close to Finney's self-built bungalow. Despite his fame, the international footballer continued to use public transport and they would occasionally meet at the local bus-stop. Finney enquired about how Ellis was settling in whereupon the young travel agent casually mentioned an annoying leak. When arriving home one evening, Ellis's wife greeted him: "You'll never believe who's been on our roof today...Tom Finney!"

==== Palermo approach ====
Along with Stanley Matthews, Finney was English football's most famous player in the decade after the war. In 1952, Preston's chairman Nat Buck rejected an offer for Finney worth £10,000 over two years from Italian club Palermo, and Finney remained a one-club player.

==== 1950s ====
In the 1952–53 season, Preston were runners-up to Arsenal in the First Division. Preston won their last three games and this run took them two points clear of Arsenal at the top of the league table, but Arsenal still had a game in hand. This match, at home to Burnley, was the championship decider and was played on the night before the 1953 FA Cup Final. Arsenal had to win to equal Preston's points total and overtake them on goal average. (Note: Throughout Finney's career, the Football League system was two points for a win and one point for a draw. Goal average (goals scored / goals conceded) was used as the tie breaker for teams with an equal points total. Goal difference was introduced in 1975 and three points for a win in 1981.) They won 3–2 and claimed the title by the margin of 0.099 of a goal. It was the closest that Finney came to a major title in his career.

He played for Preston in the 1954 FA Cup final against West Bromwich Albion, his only cup final appearance. Preston lost 3–2 and Finney revealed in his autobiography that he was not fully match fit and "did not give his best performance".

Finney formed an attacking partnership with Tommy Thompson in the 1950s. In the 1956–57 season they scored a combined total of 57 goals; in 1957–58 their combined tally was 60 goals. Preston were First Division runners-up again in 1957–58, five points behind champions Wolverhampton Wanderers.

=== England ===
Finney made his international debut for England on 28 September 1946, only four weeks after his Football League debut. The match was at Windsor Park against Ireland in the Home Championship. Finney scored once in England's 7–2 victory. He later said the match was his "proudest day as a footballer".

Finney won 76 caps and scored 30 goals in an England career that spanned twelve years and included 51 victories. He scored his 29th international goal in June 1958 against the Soviet Union to become joint England all-time top-scorer, sharing the record with Vivian Woodward and Nat Lofthouse. In October the same year, he netted his 30th goal, against Northern Ireland, to become the sole holder of the record. Finney made his final appearance for England on 22 October 1958, in a 5–0 win over the Soviet Union at Wembley. In the same match, Lofthouse equalled Finney's tally of 30 goals for England. Both were surpassed by Bobby Charlton on 12 October 1963.

=== Style and technique ===
Finney was a versatile attacking player who could operate in any forward position on either side of the pitch or at centre forward. In the 1950s, he was often compared with Stanley Matthews and football fans would debate who was the best player, given Matthews' dribbling skills and Finney's all-round ability. Relatively small in stature, Finney could withstand hard tackling, but his movement, speed and ball control invariably enabled him to avoid contact with defenders. While Finney was himself a frequent goal scorer, he was also a creator of goals and it was because of his assists that he was considered "the ideal team man".

Finney was voted Footballer of the Year in 1953–54. He won the award again in 1956–57, becoming the first player to win it a second time.

Finney respected the rules of football and believed in fair play and sportsmanship. He was never booked or sent off in his career. Both on and off the field, he always had a reputation as a gentleman. Dave Whelan supported this view when he said of Finney: "He was and still is a total gentleman".

== Retirement from Preston North End ==
Finney retired from competitive football in 1960 because of a persistent groin injury. He had played his entire career for his local club, making 433 League appearances and scoring 187 goals. At the end of the 1960–61 season, the first after Finney's retirement, Preston were relegated from the First Division and have not returned to the top flight since.

Finney continued playing football after he left Preston, often appearing in charity and benefit matches. In 1962, he played in the Eastern Canada Professional Soccer League with Toronto City, scoring one goal in his only appearance. In 1963, he played for Northern Irish club Distillery against Benfica in the European Cup.

== Later years ==
Finney with the Football League championship trophy in 1999

Finney continued to run his plumbing business in Preston and he also worked for local charities and hospitals. On 9 November 1988, he was the subject of This Is Your Life. Finney was led to believe he was attending a sports function in central London, and was then surprised by the host Michael Aspel and many of Finney's former teammates. In 2007, he was awarded an honorary fellowship by Myerscough College in Preston. Celebrating Finney's 90th birthday in 2012, Tommy Docherty said "To me, Messi is Finney reborn".

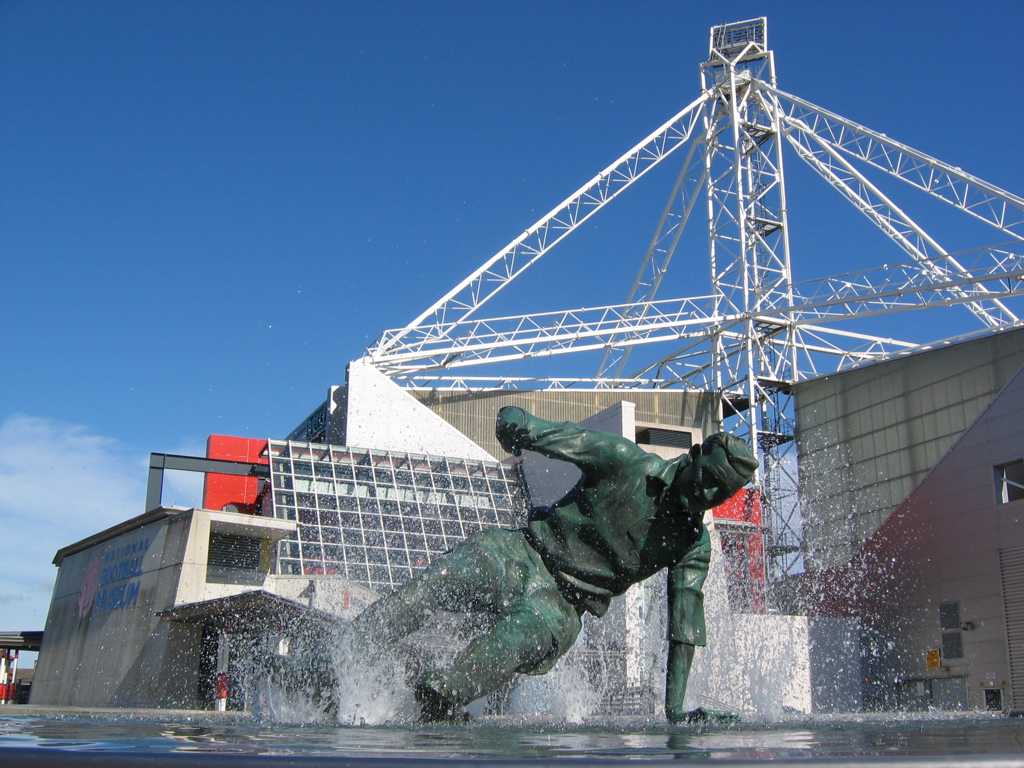
The Splash sculpture outside the old National Football Museum in Preston

On 31 July 2004, Finney unveiled the water feature sculpture The Splash, by sculptor Peter Hodgkinson, outside Deepdale stadium which at that time housed The National Football Museum. The sculpture was inspired by the 1956 Sports Photograph of the Year which shows Finney beating two Chelsea defenders at a waterlogged Stamford Bridge, which was taken on 25 August 1956 by photographer John Horton. The museum relocated to Manchester in 2012 but the statue remains at Deepdale.

Finney maintained his links with Preston North End as the club's president and 2006 marked 60 years since his League debut for the club. To celebrate this diamond anniversary, the National Football Museum, an organisation which he championed and with which he had close links, invited football fans to sign a specially commissioned flag which was presented to Finney at the beginning of the 2006–07 season to mark his 60 years with Preston. He was also club president of non-league Kendal Town.

Finney was appointed an Officer of the Order of the British Empire (OBE) in the 1961 Birthday Honours after his retirement from competitive football. Later, in recognition of his charitable work, he was appointed a Commander of the Order of the British Empire (CBE) in the 1992 New Year Honours and then knighted in the 1998 New Year Honours.

== Personal life ==
Finney was married to Elsie Noblett from 1945 until her death in 2004. They had two children: a son Brian (born 1947) and a daughter Barbara (born 1950). In her later years, Lady Finney suffered from Alzheimer's disease, which led Finney, as her full-time carer, to be a strong supporter of the Alzheimer's Society. Two Preston care homes, Finney House and Lady Elsie Finney House, are named after the Finneys.

== Death and legacy ==
Finney died in Preston on 14 February 2014. The cause of death was not announced. At the time of his death aged 91, he was one of England's oldest living former international footballers.

Finney was highly regarded by his former teammate Bill Shankly, who described Finney as "the greatest player I ever saw, bar none". On another occasion, Shankly said that Finney was "a ghost of a player but very strong. He could have played all day in his overcoat". Stanley Matthews once ranked him alongside Pelé, Diego Maradona, George Best and Alfredo Di Stéfano as one of the few players who could "dictate the pace and course of a game on a regular basis".

In a tribute to Finney, The Football Association described him as "one of England's all-time greatest players" and Bobby Charlton said Finney's contributions to football were "immeasurable". In April 2014, Northern Premier League club Bamber Bridge announced their Irongate Ground would be renamed the Sir Tom Finney Stadium.

Ahead of the 2021–22 EFL Championship season, the EFL agreed that the West Lancashire derby between Preston North End and Blackpool would take place at Deepdale on the evening of 5 April 2022, to celebrate the centenary of Finney's birth. Preston won 1–0 before a crowd of 18,740, nearly a full house.

== Career statistics ==
=== Club ===
Appearances and goals by club, season and competition
Club	Season	League			National Cup		Continental		Total	
Club	Season	Division	Apps	Goals	Apps	Goals	Apps	Goals	Apps	Goals
Preston North End	1946–47	First Division	32	7	3	2	—		35	9
Preston North End	1947–48	First Division	33	13	4	1	—		37	14
Preston North End	1948–49	First Division	24	7	2	2	—		26	9
Preston North End	1949–50	Second Division	37	10	1	1	—		38	11
Preston North End	1950–51	Second Division	34	13	2	0	—		36	13
Preston North End	1951–52	First Division	33	13	0	0	—		33	13
Preston North End	1952–53	First Division	34	17	3	2	—		37	19
Preston North End	1953–54	First Division	23	11	8	3	—		31	14
Preston North End	1954–55	First Division	30	7	3	2	—		33	9
Preston North End	1955–56	First Division	32	17	1	1	—		33	18
Preston North End	1956–57	First Division	34	23	6	5	—		40	28
Preston North End	1957–58	First Division	34	26	1	0	—		35	26
Preston North End	1958–59	First Division	16	6	0	0	—		16	6
Preston North End	1959–60	First Division	37	17	6	4	—		43	21
Distillery	1963–64	Irish League	0	0	0	0	1	0	1	0
Career total			433	187	40	23	1	0	474	210

=== International goals ===
Scores and results list England's goal tally first, score column indicates score after each Finney goal.

List of international goals scored by Tom Finney
No.	Date	Venue	Opponent	Score	Result	Competition
1	28 September 1946	Windsor Park, Belfast, Northern Ireland	Ireland	4–0	7–2	1946–47 British Home Championship
2	30 September 1946	Dalymount Park, Dublin, Republic of Ireland	Republic of Ireland	1–0	1–0	Friendly
3	27 November 1946	Leeds Road, Huddersfield, England	Netherlands	6–1	8–2	Friendly
4	3 May 1947	Highbury, London, England	France	1–0	3–0	Friendly
5	25 May 1947	Estádio Nacional, Lisbon, Portugal	Portugal	4–0	10–0	Friendly
6	21 September 1947	Heysel Stadium, Brussels, Belgium	Belgium	3–0	5–2	Friendly
7	21 September 1947	Heysel Stadium, Brussels, Belgium	Belgium	4–2	5–2	Friendly
8	18 October 1947	Ninian Park, Cardiff, Wales	Wales	1–0	3–0	1947–48 British Home Championship
9	10 April 1948	Hampden Park, Glasgow, Scotland	Scotland	1–0	2–0	1947–48 British Home Championship
10	16 May 1948	Stadio Comunale, Turin, Italy	Italy	3–0	4–0	Friendly
11	16 May 1948	Stadio Comunale, Turin, Italy	Italy	4–0	4–0	Friendly
12	10 November 1948	Villa Park, Birmingham, England	Wales	1–0	1–0	1948–49 British Home Championship
13	13 May 1949	Råsunda Stadium, Stockholm, Sweden	Sweden	1–3	1–3	Friendly
14	18 May 1949	Ullevaal Stadion, Oslo, Norway	Norway	2–0	4–1	Friendly
15	14 May 1950	Estádio Nacional, Lisbon, Portugal	Portugal	1–0	5–3	Friendly
16	14 May 1950	Estádio Nacional, Lisbon, Portugal	Portugal	3–0	5–3	Friendly
17	14 May 1950	Estádio Nacional, Lisbon, Portugal	Portugal	4–1	5–3	Friendly
18	14 May 1950	Estádio Nacional, Lisbon, Portugal	Portugal	5–3	5–3	Friendly
19	14 April 1951	Wembley Stadium, London, England	Scotland	2–3	2–3	1950–51 British Home Championship
20	19 May 1951	Goodison Park, Liverpool, England	Portugal	3–2	5–2	Friendly
21	12 November 1952	Wembley Stadium, London, England	Wales	1–0	5–2	1952–53 British Home Championship
22	21 November 1953	Yankee Stadium, New York City, US	United States	—	6–3	Friendly
23	21 November 1953	Yankee Stadium, New York City, US	United States	—	6–3	Friendly
24	26 June 1954	St. Jakob Stadium, Basel, Switzerland	Uruguay	2–3	2–4	1954 FIFA World Cup; Quarter-finals
25	2 November 1955	Wembley Stadium, London, England	Northern Ireland	3–0	3–0	1955–56 British Home Championship
26	30 November 1955	Wembley Stadium, London, England	Spain	3–0	4–1	Friendly
27	14 November 1956	Wembley Stadium, London, England	Wales	3–1	3–1	1956–57 British Home Championship
28	19 October 1957	Ninian Park, Cardiff, Wales	Wales	3–0	4–0	1957–58 British Home Championship
29	8 June 1958	Ullevi, Gothenburg, Sweden	Soviet Union	2–2	2–2	1958 FIFA World Cup; Group 4
30	4 October 1958	Windsor Park, Belfast, Northern Ireland	Northern Ireland	2–2	3–3	1958–59 British Home Championship

== Honours ==
Preston North End

- Football League Second Division: 1950–51
- FA Cup runner-up: 1953–54

England

- British Home Championship: 1946–47, 1947–48, 1949–50, 1951–52, 1952–53, 1953–54, 1955–56, 1956–57, 1957–58, 1958–59

Individual

- FWA Footballer of the Year: 1954, 1957
- SPFA Special Merit Award: 2006

== Bibliography ==
- Agnew, Paul (2002) [first published 1989]. Football Legend. Bury: Milo Books. ISBN 978-09-53084-79-1.
- Finney, Tom (2004). My Autobiography. London: Headline Publishing. ISBN 978-07-55311-06-4.
