= Andy McLaren (footballer, born 1922) =

Scottish footballer (1922–1996)

Personal information
- Full name: Andrew McLaren
- Date of birth: 24 January 1922
- Place of birth: Larkhall, Scotland
- Date of death: 14 December 1996 (aged 74)
- Place of death: Chorley England
- Position: Inside forward

Youth career
- Larkhall Thistle

Senior career*
Years	Team	Apps	(Gls)
1939–1948	Preston North End	69	(29)
1948–1949	Burnley	3	(1)
1949–1951	Sheffield United	31	(4)
1951–1954	Barrow	155	(52)
1954–1955	Bradford Park Avenue	18	(7)
1955	Southport	4	(1)
1955–1957	Rochdale	44	(12)
	Fleetwood	?	(?)

International career
1947-1948	Scotland	4	(4)
- * Club domestic league appearances and goals

Andrew McLaren (24 January 1922 – 14 December 1996) was a Scottish professional footballer who played as an inside forward. He was on the books of a number of teams in The Football League.

== Career ==
He started as a youth player with Preston North End in 1937, serving on the ground staff at Deepdale with Tom Finney and playing with him in the B team. He played for Preston in the Football League War Cup in 1940–41 when they won the league and cup. He served in the army during the war, with some service in Egypt.

In 1947 he played in four international matches for Scotland, scoring four goals.

== International goals ==
Scotland score first

#	Date	Venue	Opponent	Score	Result	Competition
1	12 April 1947	Wembley Stadium, London	England	1–0	1–1	British Home Championship
2	24 May 1947	Stade Josy Barthel, Luxembourg	Luxembourg	4–0	6–0	Friendly
3	24 May 1947	Stade Josy Barthel, Luxembourg	Luxembourg	6–0	6–0	Friendly
4	12 November 1947	Hampden Park, Glasgow	Wales	1–0	1–2	British Home Championship

== Personal life ==
McLaren's father George was also a footballer.

He was found dead alone at his home in Chorley. Police believed that he had been dead for some days before his body was discovered. He was estranged from his wife at the time of his death.

A collection of McLaren's medals and a team photograph were featured on the ITV antiques-based television programme Dickinson's Real Deal in 2018 after being found during a property renovation. They were subsequently sold at auction for £1000.
