= Dietmar Bruck =

Footballer (born 1944)

Personal information
- Date of birth: 19 April 1944 (age 82)
- Place of birth: Danzig, Germany
- Position: Full-back

Youth career
- Coventry City

Senior career*
Years	Team	Apps	(Gls)
1961–1970	Coventry City	189	(7)
1970–1972	Charlton Athletic	56	(0)
1972–1974	Northampton Town	41	(0)
1974–1975	Nuneaton Borough		
1975–1977	Weymouth		

Managerial career
- 1975–1977: Weymouth (player-manager)
- 1977–19xx: Redditch United
- 1985: Leamington (caretaker manager)
- * Club domestic league appearances and goals

Dietmar Bruck (born 19 April 1944) is a former professional footballer who played in the Football League as a full-back for Coventry City, where he spent the majority of his career, Charlton Athletic and Northampton Town.

== Career ==
Bruck began his football career as an apprentice with Coventry City, and made his league debut at home to Swindon Town on 28 April 1961, aged just 17 years 9 days. He became the first substitute used by Coventry City when he replaced Ron Farmer in a 3–3 draw against Manchester City on 4 September 1965. He was part of the Coventry team that won the Second Division title in 1967, and played 189 league games for the club.

He moved to Charlton Athletic in October 1970 for a fee of £15,000, and two years later joined Northampton Town.

After leaving Northampton he was part of the Nuneaton Borough team that reached the first round proper of the 1974–75 FA Cup before moving to Weymouth as player-manager. He was sacked from his post at Weymouth in January 1977, subsequently managed Redditch United and Racing Club Warwick, and in the 1985–86 season had a week as caretaker manager of Leamington.

== Personal life ==
Bruck was born in Danzig, then in Germany, and came to England as a child. He was raised in Coventry and attended Bishop Ullathorne RC School. After his football career came to an end, he worked as a financial consultant for an insurance company, and after retirement worked as a "community champion" with Tesco in Coventry. Bruck also worked part time as a PE Teacher at Abbotsford School in Kenilworth in the late 1970s. He was married to Maureen until her death, and in 2003 survived a car crash in which his partner, Sue, was killed.
