= Roy Littlejohn =

English footballer

Personal information
- Date of birth: 2 June 1933
- Place of birth: Bournemouth, England
- Date of death: 6 September 2022 (aged 89)
- Position: Outside right

Senior career*
Years	Team	Apps	(Gls)
1952–1956	Bournemouth & Boscombe Athletic	22	(2)
1956–1957	Portsmouth	?	(?)
1957–1959	Woking	52	(18)

International career
- England Amateurs
- * Club domestic league appearances and goals

Roy Littlejohn (2 June 1933 – 6 September 2022) was an English footballer who played in the Football League for Bournemouth & Boscombe Athletic. He was an England amateur international and won the 1958 Amateur Cup with Woking.

Littlejohn, who played as an outside-right, began his football career as a junior with Bournemouth & Boscombe Athletic, and made his first-team debut during the 1952–53 season. He was on Portsmouth's books for a time while doing his National Service with the Royal Engineers, and by 1957 was a Woking player, and, as a PT instructor, was involved in training the team. He was part of the Woking team that won the FA Amateur Cup in 1958, involved in the first two goals as Woking defeated Ilford 3–0 at Wembley.

Littlejohn retained amateur status throughout his career, and was capped a number of times for the England amateur team. He played for the Great Britain Olympic team eliminated in the qualifying round for the 1956 Games, but was not selected for the team which eventually competed by special invitation. He also was part of a British "FA XI" that toured Nigeria and Ghana in 1958.

He pursued a career in architecture later on in life.
