= Jesús Ares =

Spanish footballer (1933–2024)

Personal information
- Full name: Jesús Ares Otero
- Date of birth: 20 November 1933
- Place of birth: Foz, Spain
- Date of death: 8 November 2024 (aged 90)
- Height: 1.74 m (5 ft 9 in)
- Position: Midfielder

Senior career*
Years	Team	Apps	(Gls)
1951–1952	Lucense	1	(0)
1952–1954	Racing Ferrol	33	(2)
1954–1957	Celta	36	(2)
1957–1958	Atlético Madrid	6	(0)
1958–1959	Málaga	27	(3)
1960–1963	Salamanca	71	(0)
1963–1966	Langreo	71	(0)
Total		245	(7)
- * Club domestic league appearances and goals

Jesús Ares Otero (20 November 1933 – 8 November 2024) was a Spanish footballer who played as a midfielder.

== Career ==
Ares began his career in the Segunda División with local club Lucense, playing once. In 1952, Ares signed for fellow Galician club Racing Ferrol, where he played for two seasons, making 33 league appearances, scoring twice.

In March 1954, Ares signed for Primera División club Celta Vigo. Ares failed to break into the first team at Celta in his first two full seasons at the club, making just seven appearances, before finding favour under new manager Alejandro Scopelli in the 1956–57 season, making 28 appearances. On 11 November 1956, Ares scored his first goal for Celta in a 3–0 away win against Deportivo La Coruña in the Galician derby. In 1957, Atlético Madrid signed Ares for 1,250,000 Ptas. Ares once again failed to cement a starting spot at Atlético Madrid and moved to Málaga in 1958.

In 1960, Ares signed for Salamanca, spending three seasons at the club, before moving to Langreo, where he retired from football in 1966.

== Death ==
Ares died on 8 November 2024, at the age of 90.
