= Walter Lord (footballer) =

English footballer

Personal information
- Date of birth: 1 November 1933
- Place of birth: Grimsby, England
- Date of death: 27 March 2022 (aged 88)
- Place of death: Grimsby
- Position: Inside forward

Senior career*
Years	Team	Apps	(Gls)
1951–1956	Grimsby Town	7	(1)
1956–1958	Lincoln City	1	(0)
1958–19??	Alford United		
- * Club domestic league appearances and goals

Walter Lord (1 November 1933 – 27 March 2022) was an English professional footballer who played as an inside forward.
