= Ron Tulloch =

Scottish footballer

Personal information
- Full name: Ronald Thomas Tulloch
- Date of birth: 5 June 1933
- Place of birth: Haddington, Scotland
- Date of death: 15 July 1981 (aged 48)
- Place of death: Carlisle, England
- Position: Inside forward

Senior career*
Years	Team	Apps	(Gls)
1955–1956	Heart of Midlothian	2	(1)
1956–1957	Southend United	11	(3)
1957–1960	Carlisle United	73	(23)
Total		86	(27)
- * Club domestic league appearances and goals

Ronald Thomas Tulloch (5 June 1933 – 15 July 1981) was a Scottish professional footballer who played as an inside forward. He began his career with Heart of Midlothian before playing in the Football League for Southend United and Carlisle United, retiring in 1960.
