= Alec Mercer =

English footballer (1891–1977)

Personal information
- Full name: Alick Mercer
- Date of birth: 12 September 1891
- Place of birth: Tamworth, England
- Date of death: 1977 (aged 85–86)
- Height: 5 ft 7 1/2 in (1.71 m)
- Position: Centre half

Senior career*
| Years | Team | Apps | (Gls) |
| 1912–1913 | Kettlebrook | | |
| 1913–1915 | Bury | 29 | (10) |
| 1919–1923 | Coventry City | 101 | (17) |
| 1923–1926 | Kidderminster Harriers | | |
| 1926 | Tamworth Castle | | |
| Total | | 130 | (27) |
- * Club domestic league appearances and goals

Alec Mercer (12 September 1891 – 1977) was an English footballer who played in the Football League for Bury and Coventry City.
