= George Trewick =

English footballer

Personal information
- Full name: George Trewick
- Date of birth: 15 November 1933
- Place of birth: Stakeford, England
- Date of death: 2003 (aged 69–70)
- Position: Wing half

Senior career*
Years	Team	Apps	(Gls)
19??–1956	West Sleekburn		
1956–1960	Gateshead	110	(0)
- * Club domestic league appearances and goals

George Trewick (15 November 1933 – 2003) was an English footballer who played as a wing half.

Trewick played in the Football League for Gateshead, making 112 appearances in league and cup between 1956 and 1960, after playing for non-league side West Sleekburn.

== Sources ==
- "George Trewick". Post War English & Scottish Football League A–Z Player's Database. Neil Brown.
- "George Trewick". English National Football Archive.
