= Albert Holmes (footballer, born 1885) =

English footballer

Personal information
- Full name: George Albert Holmes
- Date of birth: 1885
- Place of birth: Mansfield, England
- Position: Outside left

Senior career*
Years	Team	Apps	(Gls)
–1905	Hucknall Constitutional		
1905–1906	Nottingham Forest	5	(0)
1906–	Mansfield Wesleyans		
1907–1908	Chesterfield Town	51	(9)
1908–	Nelson		
–1911	Mansfield Mechanics		
1911–1915	Coventry City	101	(17)
1914	→ Heart of Midlothian (loan)	3	(1)
- Portsmouth
- * Club domestic league appearances and goals

George Albert Holmes was an English professional footballer who played as an outside left in the Football League for Nottingham Forest and Chesterfield Town, in the Scottish League for Heart of Midlothian and in the Southern League for Coventry City. He was a member of the Nottingham Forest squad which toured Argentina and Uruguay in 1905.

== Personal life ==
Holmes served as a private in the Football Battalion of the Middlesex Regiment during the First World War.

== Career statistics ==
Appearances and goals by club, season and competition
Club	Season	League			National Cup		Total	
Club	Season	Division	Apps	Goals	Apps	Goals	Apps	Goals
Nottingham Forest	1905–06	First Division	5	0	1	1	6	1
Chesterfield Town	1907–08	Second Division	14	3	0	0	14	3
Chesterfield Town	1908–09	Second Division	37	6	2	0	39	6
Chesterfield Town	Total		51	9	2	0	53	9
Coventry City	1911–12	Southern League First Division	30	3	2	0	32	3
Coventry City	1912–13	Southern League First Division	38	8	2	0	40	8
Coventry City	1913–14	Southern League First Division	26	6	1	0	27	6
Coventry City	1914–15	Southern League Second Division	7	0	1	0	8	0
Coventry City	Total		101	17	6	0	107	17
Heart of Midlothian (loan)	1913–14	Scottish League First Division	3	1	—		3	1
Career total			160	27	9	1	169	28
