= Alf Wood (footballer, born 1915) =

English footballer and manager

Personal information
- Date of birth: 14 May 1915
- Place of birth: Aldridge, England
- Date of death: 17 December 2001 (aged 86)
- Place of death: Coventry, England
- Height: 5 ft 11 in (1.80 m)
- Position: Goalkeeper

Youth career
- Nuneaton Borough
- Sutton Town

Senior career*
Years	Team	Apps	(Gls)
1935–1951	Coventry City	221	(0)
1951–1955	Northampton Town	139	(0)
1955–1959	Coventry City	13	(0)
Total		373	(0)

Managerial career
- 1963–1964: Walsall
- * Club domestic league appearances and goals

Alfred Robert Wood (14 May 1915 – 17 December 2001) was an English football goalkeeper and manager. He played a total of 373 league games in the Football League.

== Biography ==
Wood played for Nuneaton Borough and Sutton Town, before joining Coventry City in 1935, at the age of 20. After making his Second Division debut in 1938, he played 246 games in all competitions, and also made 96 wartime appearances for the "Bantams". During World War II he served under Frank Swift. Wood developed spinal meningitis and was told his footballing days were over, but he managed to prove the doctors wrong. Between August 1945 and May 1951 he played 260 consecutive games. In December 1951, he joined Northampton Town for a £2,100 fee. He returned to Highfield Road as a coach in 1955, but was forced to play fifteen games for the now Third Division South club due to injury. The last of his appearances came against Plymouth Argyle on 6 December 1958, he became the oldest player to turn out for Coventry, aged 43 years and 207 days. He left the club in November 1961, when Jimmy Hill was appointed manager.

Wood was appointed a coach at Third Division Walsall in October 1963, and took up the management reins at Fellows Park the following month. He signed talented striker Allan Clarke, but was fired in October 1964. He then returned to Coventry, and managed the Massey Ferguson works team.

He died in December 2001 at the age of 86, leaving behind son Robin.

== Honours ==
- Coventry City Hall of Fame
