= Tom Crawley =

Scottish footballer

Personal information
- Date of birth: 10 November 1911
- Place of birth: Blantyre, Scotland
- Date of death: 1977 (aged 65–66)
- Place of death: Coventry, England
- Height: 5 ft 9 in (1.75 m)
- Position: Centre forward

Senior career*
Years	Team	Apps	(Gls)
- Blantyre Victoria
1932–1934	Hamilton Academical	46	(25)
1934–1935	Motherwell	8	(9)
1935	Hamilton Academical	0	(0)
1935–1936	Preston North End	2	(0)
1935–1947	Coventry City	45	(16)
Total		101	(50)
- * Club domestic league appearances and goals

Thomas Crawley (10 November 1911 – 1977) was a Scottish footballer who played as a centre forward for Hamilton Academical, Motherwell, Preston North End and Coventry City.

He signed for Hamilton as a replacement for the injured David Wilson and moved to Motherwell for the same reason to fill in for Willie MacFadyen, but was unable to displace either of them on a long-term basis despite a good scoring record (they were among the leading forwards of the period in Scottish football). He turned out for Accies once more in the summer of 1935 in the Rosebery Charity Cup in 1935 with Wilson unavailable.

Crawley then moved to England, firstly for a short spell with Preston. In his later years at Coventry (where he stayed until after World War II), he moved back to play at centre half. During the war he made guest appearances for Nottingham Forest and Leicester City.

His son Tommy and grandson Ian both played in non-league football in the East Midlands, Ian winning the FA Vase with VS Rugby and the FA Trophy with Telford United in the 1980s.
