= Mike Phillips (footballer) =

Scottish footballer (1933–2020)

Personal information
- Full name: Michael Shirkie Phillips
- Date of birth: 18 January 1933
- Place of birth: Cumnock, Scotland
- Date of death: January 2020 (aged 86-87)
- Place of death: Cumnock, Scotland
- Position: Forward

Senior career*
Years	Team	Apps	(Gls)
1953–1955	Cumnock Juniors		
1955	Grimsby Town	6	(1)
1956–1957	Cheltenham Town		
1957–19??	Stranraer		
- * Club domestic league appearances and goals

Michael Shirkie Phillips (18 January 1933 - January 2020) was a Scottish professional footballer who played as a forward.
