= Ceninho =

Brazilian footballer (born 1933)

Personal information
- Full name: Avâtenio Antônio da Costa
- Date of birth: 13 July 1933 (age 93)
- Place of birth: Ituiutaba, Brazil
- Position: Forward

Senior career*
Years	Team	Apps	(Gls)
1950–1952	Siderúrgica		
1953–1954	Fluminense		
1955	Guarani		
1956	Vasco da Gama		
1957	America-RJ		
1957	Vitória		
1958–1959	Internacional		
1960–1961	Braga		
1962–1963	Audax Italiano		
1963	Cruzeiro do Sul		
1964–1965	Rabello		

International career
1957	Brazil	1	
- * Club domestic league appearances and goals

Avâtenio Antônio da Costa (Ceninho) (born 13 July 1933) is a Brazilian former footballer who played as a forward for clubs of Brazil, Chile and Portugal. He made one appearance for the Brazil national team in 1957.

== Clubs ==
- Siderurgica 1950–1952
- Fluminense 1953–1954
- Guarani 1955
- America-RJ 1956
- Vitória 1957
- Internacional 1958–1959
- Braga 1960–1961
- Audax Italiano 1962–1963
- Cruzeiro do Sul 1963
- Rabello 1964-1965
