= John Abthorpe =

English footballer

Personal information
- Full name: John Abthorpe
- Date of birth: 19 January 1933
- Place of birth: Nottingham, England
- Date of death: 7 July 2005 (aged 72)
- Place of death: Nottingham, England
- Position: Forward

Senior career*
Years	Team	Apps	(Gls)
1954–1955	Wolverhampton Wanderers	0	(0)
1955–1956	Notts County	5	(3)
- * Club domestic league appearances and goals

John Abthorpe (19 January 1933 – 7 July 2005), born and died in Nottingham, was an English amateur footballer who played in the Football League as a forward.
