= Attilio Galassini =

Italian footballer (1933–2002)

Personal information
- Date of birth: 22 May 1933
- Place of birth: Rome, Kingdom of Italy
- Date of death: 1 May 2002 (aged 68)
- Place of death: Marghera, Italy
- Position: Forward

Senior career*
Years	Team	Apps	(Gls)
1952–1953	Rieti		
1953–1955	Roma	0	(0)
1955–1959	Hellas Verona	59	(10)
1958–1959	→ Ozo Mantova (loan)		
1960	Toronto Italia		
1960–1961	Ukrainian Nationals		
1961	Toronto Roma		
1961–1962	Inter-Brooklyn Italians		
1962	Toronto Italia		
1962–1963	Chieti	9	(0)
1964–1965	Rieti		
- * Club domestic league appearances and goals

Attilio Galassini (22 May 1933 – 1 May 2002) was an Italian footballer who played as a forward.

== Career ==
Galassini was a product of the Lazio youth system. In 1952, after failing to break into the senior team he played in the Promozione with Rieti. The following season he was signed by Roma, but joined Hellas Verona in the Serie B in 1955 after failing to make an appearance with Roma. During his tenure with Verona he assisted in securing promotion to the Serie A by winning the league title in the 1956–57 season. He featured in eleven matches and recorded two goals in the top flight.

In 1958, he was loaned to Ozo Mantova, where he contributed in securing the Serie C title. In 1960, he played abroad in the National Soccer League with Toronto Italia. In his debut season in Toronto he assisted in securing the double (league title & NSL Championship) for the team. He featured in a series matches for the NSL Championship final where he contributed several goals against Montreal Cantalia.

In 1961, he signed with league rivals Toronto Roma, and secured the league title for the club. He was also named to the NSL All-Star team. After the conclusion of the 1961 National Soccer League season he played in the American Soccer League with the Philadelphia Ukrainian Nationals. In 1962, he was transferred to the Inter-Brooklyn Italians. For the remainder of the season he played in the Eastern Canada Professional Soccer League with former club Toronto Italia, and secured the ECPSL Championship. He returned to Italy after his tenure with Toronto Italia to play in Serie C with Chieti. In 1965, he returned to play with FC Rieti in Serie D.

== Death ==
Galassini died on 1 May 2002, in Marghera, Venice.

== Honors ==
Hellas Verona

- Serie B: 1956-1957

Ozo Mantova

- Serie C: 1958-1959

Toronto Italia

- ECPSL Championship: 1962
- NSL Championship: 1960
- National Soccer League: 1960
