= Clarrie Bourton =

English footballer

Personal information
- Full name: Clarence Frederick Thomas Bourton
- Date of birth: 30 September 1908
- Place of birth: Paulton, England
- Date of death: 1981 (aged 72–73)
- Height: 5 ft 9 1/2 in (1.77 m)
- Position: Centre forward

Senior career*
Years	Team	Apps	(Gls)
1928	Bristol City	4	(1)
1928–1931	Blackburn Rovers	63	(37)
1931–1937	Coventry City	228	(173)
1937–1938	Plymouth Argyle	8	(3)
1938–1939	Bristol City	57	(14)
Total		360	(228)

Managerial career
- 1938–1939: Bristol City
- * Club domestic league appearances and goals

Clarence Frederick Thomas "Clarrie" Bourton (30 September 1908 – 1981) was an English footballer who played in the Football League for Bristol City, Blackburn Rovers, Coventry City and Plymouth Argyle. He is Coventry City's all-time leading goalscorer with 182 goals.

== Life and career ==
Born in Paulton, Bourton was a primarily a centre forward, but could also play as an inside forward. He played non-league football for Paulton United before being signed by Bristol City, making his debut in the Football League in April 1928. He scored one goal in four appearances towards the end of the 1927–28 season. That summer he was transferred to FA Cup holders Blackburn Rovers and scored on his debut in a 1–1 draw at home to Bury. Bourton scored six goals in his first four matches, including all four in a 4–1 win against Manchester United at Old Trafford, and finished the season with 15 goals in 34 league and cup games as the club finished seventh in the First Division, which was their best since the First World War. He lost his place in the team to Les Bruton at the start of the following campaign, however he returned on Christmas Day 1929 to score in a 5–3 win against Sunderland and finished the season with 23 goals in 26 games, including four in a 7–5 win against Sheffield United at Bramall Lane. Rovers finished sixth in the league. In his last season at Ewood Park, he scored four goals in 11 matches.

Harry Storer was appointed Coventry City manager in April 1931 and, having noticed him while Storer played for Burnley, Bourton joined the club ahead of the 1931–32 season. He finished as the Football League's top goalscorer that season, having found the net 49 times in the Third Division South, including seven hat-tricks. He scored 40 league goals the following season, and received honours in 1936 when Coventry were promoted to the Second Division as Third Division South champions. During his six seasons with the club, Coventry scored 577 league goals and Bourton contributed 173 of them in 228 appearances. He was transferred to Second Division rivals Plymouth Argyle at the age of 29. His time with the club was brief. Bourton made his debut in October 1937 and scored three goals in nine league and cup appearances. He made the last of those appearances in January 1938 and then returned to Bristol City.

He was appointed as the club's captain and in October filled in for Bob Hewison as manager. Hewison was accused of making illegal payments to amateur players and was suspended until the end of the season after an inquiry by the Football Association and the Football League. Bourton was manager for seven months and City finished eighth in Third Division South before Hewison returned in May 1939. He scored 14 league goals in 57 appearances before the Second World War brought his career to a premature end. He continued to work for the club after his retirement from playing and was employed in the pools office until shortly before his death in 1981.

== Honours ==
- Coventry City F.C. Hall of Fame
