= Jimmy Ashall =

English footballer

Personal information
- Date of birth: 13 December 1933 (age 92)
- Place of birth: Temple Normanton, England
- Position: Defender

Senior career*
Years	Team	Apps	(Gls)
1955–1961	Leeds United	89	(0)
- * Club domestic league appearances and goals

Jimmy Ashall (born 13 December 1933) is an English former footballer who played in the Football League for Leeds United.
