= Jack Marsh (footballer, born 1922) =

English footballer

Personal information
- Full name: John Kirk Marsh
- Date of birth: 8 October 1922
- Place of birth: Mansfield, England
- Date of death: 5 December 1997 (aged 75)
- Place of death: Mansfield, England
- Position: Inside forward

Youth career
- Mansfield BC

Senior career*
Years	Team	Apps	(Gls)
1942–1948	Notts County	42	(18)
1948–1950	Coventry City	20	(7)
1950	Leicester City	14	(4)
1950–1951	Chesterfield	26	(4)
- Worksop Town
Total		102	(33)
- * Club domestic league appearances and goals

John Kirk Marsh (8 October 1922 – 5 December 1997) was an English professional footballer who played as an inside forward.

== Career ==
Born in Mansfield, Marsh played for Mansfield BC, Notts County, Coventry City, Leicester City, Chesterfield and Worksop Town.
