= George Mason (footballer, born 1913) =

English footballer

Personal information
- Full name: George William Mason
- Date of birth: 5 September 1913
- Place of birth: Birmingham, England
- Date of death: 12 August 1993 (aged 79)
- Place of death: Coventry, England
- Height: 6 ft 0 in (1.83 m)
- Position: Centre half

Senior career*
Years	Team	Apps	(Gls)
- Birmingham
- Redhill Amateurs
1931–1952	Coventry City	330	(6)
- Nuneaton Borough

International career
- England schools
- England wartime
- * Club domestic league appearances and goals

George William Mason (5 September 1913 – 12 August 1993) was an English professional footballer who played as a centre half for Birmingham, Redhill Amateurs, Coventry City and Nuneaton Borough. He also played for England at schools and wartime levels.

He was Coventry's captain when they won the 1936 Division 3 South title. After retiring as a player he ran a pub and later worked for Jaguar, retiring in 1978.
