= George Hudson (footballer) =

English footballer (1937–2020)

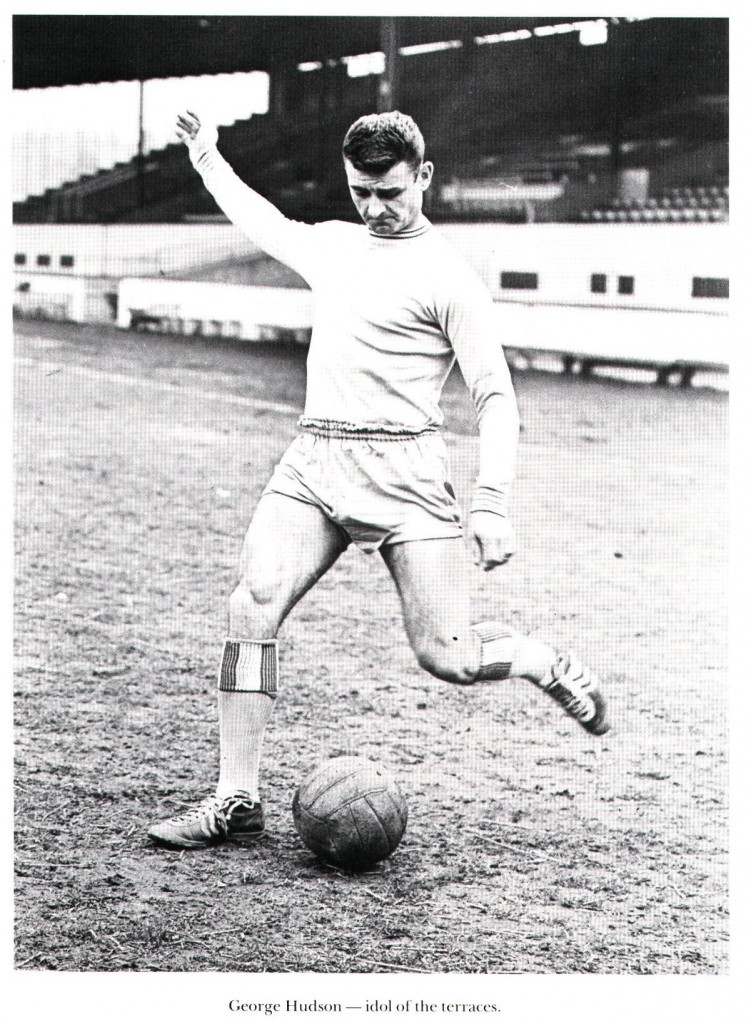

Personal information
- Full name: George Anthony Hudson
- Date of birth: 14 March 1937
- Place of birth: Manchester, England
- Date of death: 28 December 2020 (aged 83)
- Position: Centre forward

Senior career*
Years	Team	Apps	(Gls)
1958–1960	Blackburn Rovers	4	(1)
1960–1961	Accrington Stanley	44	(35)
1961–1963	Peterborough United	65	(39)
1963–1966	Coventry City	113	(62)
1966–1967	Northampton Town	18	(6)
1967–1969	Tranmere Rovers	54	(20)
1969–1970	Altrincham	2	(0)
Total		296	(162)
- * Club domestic league appearances and goals

George Anthony Hudson (14 March 1937 – 28 December 2020) was an English professional footballer, born in Manchester, who played as a centre forward in the Football League.

When Hudson joined Coventry City in April 1963, the £21,000 fee was the club's record transfer.

After his football career, Hudson worked on the Daily Mirror printing press in Manchester.

== Honours ==
- Coventry City Hall of Fame
