= Arthur Bacon =

English footballer

Personal information
- Date of birth: 31 March 1905
- Place of birth: Birdholme, England
- Date of death: 27 July 1942 (aged 37)
- Place of death: Derby, England
- Positions: Centre forward; inside left

Youth career
- New Tupton Ivanhoe

Senior career*
Years	Team	Apps	(Gls)
1923–1925	Chesterfield	0	(0)
1925–1927	Derby County	8	(3)
1927–1928	Manchester City	5	(1)
1928–1932	Reading	69	(44)
1932–1933	Chesterfield	30	(6)
1933–1935	Coventry City	16	(17)
1935–?	Burton Town	?	(?)
Total		128	(71)
- * Club domestic league appearances and goals

Arthur Bacon (31 March 1905 – 27 July 1942) was an English footballer who played as either a striker or an inside forward. Although frequently a reserve throughout his career Bacon managed an impressive strike rate with 71 league goals in 128 games.

After playing his youth football with New Tupton Ivanhoe Bacon signed for Chesterfield but failed to make an appearance at the club before a move to Derby County. Bacon failed to gain a first-team place at Derby and an equally unproductive spell at Manchester City followed before he joined Reading. He became a prolific scorer at Elm Park and even hit six goals in a 7–3 win over Stoke City during the 1930–31 season, which stands as the club record for the most goals by one player in a match.

Bacon returned to Chesterfield for the 1932–33 season, although he managed only six goals in 30 league appearances. Following this he enjoyed a productive spell at Coventry City, where his former Derby teammate Harry Storer Jr. was the manager. After Storer added Bacon to his squad in 1933 the striker promptly scored 14 goals over four games, all in the space of 15 days. Despite this he found opportunities at Highfield Road limited and dropped out of the Football League in 1935 to finish his career at Burton Town.

During the Second World War Bacon reportedly served as a War reserve constable in Derby, however his occupation was with the Rolls-Royce factory where he was a fireman. He was killed, aged 37, in Hawthorn Street during an air-raid on 27 July 1942. There is some dispute as to whether he was a victim of the bombs or one of those machine-gunned from the attacking aircraft.

He is commemorated on the memorial in the Chesterfield FC Memorial Garden at the Chesterfield Proact Stadium based on his death while serving in uniform.
