= Martin McDonnell =

English footballer

Personal information
- Full name: Martin Henry McDonnell
- Date of birth: 27 April 1924
- Place of birth: Newton-le-Willows, England
- Date of death: 7 April 1988 (aged 63)
- Place of death: Bedford, England
- Position: Centre half

Senior career*
| Years | Team | Apps | (Gls) |
| 19??–1942 | Haydock C&B | | |
| 1942–194? | Everton | 0 | (0) |
| 194?–1946 | Earlestown | | |
| 1946–1947 | Southport | 38 | (0) |
| 1947–1949 | Birmingham City | 32 | (0) |
| 1949–1955 | Coventry City | 232 | (0) |
| 1955–1958 | Derby County | 93 | (0) |
| 1958–19?? | Crewe Alexandra | 17 | (0) |
- * Club domestic league appearances and goals

Martin Henry McDonnell (27 April 1924 – 7 April 1988) was an English footballer who played as a centre half. He made 412 appearances in the Football League, playing for Southport, Birmingham City, Coventry City, Derby County and Crewe Alexandra.

McDonnell was born in Newton-le-Willows, which was then in Lancashire, in 1924. He played local football for Haydock C&B before joining Everton in 1942. After seven appearances in the wartime leagues spread over the next three seasons, he returned to local football with Earlestown, from where he joined Southport in August 1946, before the Football League resumed after the war. After one season Harry Storer signed him for Birmingham City as deputy for Ted Duckhouse. Two years later, Storer, now managing Coventry City, signed him again, and McDonnell remained at the club for six seasons and played 250 games in all competitions. When Storer took over as manager of Derby County, he promptly signed McDonnell for the third time. After three seasons with Derby, where he played more than 100 games in all competitions and helped the club win the Third Division North title in 1956–57, McDonnell finished off his professional career at Crewe Alexandra. He died in Bedford in 1988.

== Honours ==
Derby County

- Third Division North: 1956–57
