= Harry Buckle =

Irish footballer

Personal information
- Date of birth: 6 March 1882
- Place of birth: Belfast, Ireland
- Date of death: 2 January 1965 (aged 82)
- Place of death: Cork, Ireland
- Height: 1.78 m (5 ft 10 in)
- Position: Forward

Senior career*
Years	Team	Apps	(Gls)
1901–1902	Cliftonville		
1902–1906	Sunderland	44	(14)
1906–1907	Portsmouth		
1907–1908	Bristol Rovers		
1908–1911	Coventry City		
1911–1912	Belfast Celtic		
1914–1917	Glenavon		
1917–1922	Belfast United		
1922–1926	Fordsons		

International career
1902–1908	Ireland	3	(0)

Managerial career
- 1909–1910: Coventry City
- * Club domestic league appearances and goals

Harry Buckle (6 March 1882 – 2 January 1965) was an Irish footballer who played for Sunderland and the Ireland national football team.

== Club career ==
He made his debut for Sunderland, after joining from Irish side Cliftonville, against Stoke City on 8 November 1902 in a 1–1 draw. He went on to make 44 league appearances scoring 14 goals for Sunderland, before moving onto Portsmouth helping them to win a trophy. He had a short stay at the south coast side, and quickly moved onto Bristol Rovers and became the third player to receive international recognition for the club. Coventry City was his next club as he combined playing and managerial roles, to become Coventry's first ever manager. Buckle then moved around Irish clubs; Belfast Celtic, Glenavon, Belfast United and Fordsons before retiring from playing.

He scored in the final of the Gold Cup for Belfast Celtic against Glentoran in 1912.

== International career ==
Buckle gained his first international cap for Ireland while at Sunderland, against England on 12 March 1904 in a 3–1 defeat. In all he made three international appearances, without scoring.
