= Eli Bradley =

English footballer

Personal information
- Full name: Eli Bradley
- Date of birth: 14 October 1883
- Place of birth: Dudley, England
- Date of death: 1954 (aged 74–75)
- Position: Centre forward

Senior career*
Years	Team	Apps	(Gls)
1903–1904	Bilston United		
1904–1905	Dudley Town		
1905–1908	West Bromwich Albion	25	(6)
1908–1909	Luton Town		
1909–1912	Coventry City		
1912–1913	Heart of Midlothian		
1913	Dudley Town		
Total		25	(6)
- * Club domestic league appearances and goals

Eli Bradley (14 October 1883 – 1964) was an English footballer who played in the Football League for West Bromwich Albion.
