= Peter Hill (footballer) =

English footballer

Personal information
- Date of birth: 8 August 1931
- Place of birth: Heanor, England
- Date of death: 8 January 2015 (aged 83)
- Position: Inside forward

Senior career*
Years	Team	Apps	(Gls)
- Rutland United
1948–1962	Coventry City	285	(75)
- * Club domestic league appearances and goals

Peter Hill (8 August 1931 – 8 January 2015) was an English professional footballer who played as an inside forward. Born in Heanor, Hill played for Rutland United and Coventry City.
