= Brian Hill (footballer, born 1941) =

English footballer

Personal information
- Full name: Brian Hill
- Date of birth: 31 July 1941
- Place of birth: Bedworth, England
- Date of death: 27 October 2016 (aged 75)
- Place of death: Bedworth, England
- Position: Defender

Senior career*
Years	Team	Apps	(Gls)
1957–1971	Coventry City	246	(12)
1970–1971	→ Bristol City (loan)	7	(0)
1971–1973	Torquay United	49	(2)
- Bedworth United
Total		302	(14)
- * Club domestic league appearances and goals

Brian Hill (31 July 1941 – 27 October 2016) was an English footballer who played in the Football League for Bristol City, Coventry City and Torquay United.
