= Ron Farmer (footballer) =

Guernsey footballer (1936–2022)

Personal information
- Full name: Ronald James Farmer
- Date of birth: 6 March 1936
- Place of birth: Guernsey, Channel Islands
- Date of death: 9 June 2022 (aged 86)
- Positions: Left half; inside forward

Youth career
- St Aubins
- Northerners Athletic Club
- 1952–1953: Nottingham Forest

Senior career*
Years	Team	Apps	(Gls)
1953–1958	Nottingham Forest	9	(0)
1958–1967	Coventry City	285	(48)
1967–1969	Notts County	69	(5)
1969–1970	Grantham Town		
Total		363	(53)
- * Club domestic league appearances and goals

Ronald James Farmer (6 March 1936 – 9 June 2022) was a professional footballer from Guernsey who played as a left half and inside forward.

== Career ==
Farmer began his career playing with St Aubins in Jersey and Northerners Athletic Club in Guernsey, before signing for Nottingham Forest in 1952. He moved to Coventry City in November 1958, playing in all four divisions of the Football League for the club. He later played for Notts County and Grantham Town.

After retiring as a player in 1970 he returned to Coventry City briefly to work as a youth coach, before working for the Massey Ferguson tractor factory.
