= George Ashall =

English footballer (1911–1998)

Personal information
- Full name: George Henry Ashall
- Date of birth: 29 September 1911
- Place of birth: Killamarsh, Derbyshire, England
- Date of death: May 1998
- Place of death: Wolverhampton, England
- Position: Winger

Youth career
- Brodsworth Colliery
- Upton Colliery
- Frickley Colliery

Senior career*
Years	Team	Apps	(Gls)
1934–1935	Frickley Colliery		
1935–1938	Wolverhampton Wanderers	84	(14)
1938–1947	Coventry City	62	(10)
- * Club domestic league appearances and goals

George Henry Ashall (29 September 1911 – May 1998) was an English professional footballer who played in the Football League for Wolverhampton Wanderers and Coventry City.

== Career ==
Ashall became a coal miner upon leaving school but showed an interest in football, playing for several colliery football teams and having also had a trial at Huddersfield Town. He joined Wolverhampton Wanderers from Midland League Frickley Colliery to become a professional player in August 1935, and made his league debut on 4 March 1936, scoring in a 1–0 win over Grimsby Town.

He was a first choice player over his two full seasons at Molineux, making 94 appearances in total and scoring 19 goals. His form won him a place in a Football League XI that faced the Scottish League in September 1937.

He moved to Coventry City in 1938, remaining on their books for almost a decade, but with the suspension of league football due to war limiting his appearances. He also guested for Northampton Town during this period before returning to his parent club when football resumed. In September 1947, he suffered a career-ending injury against West Bromwich Albion.

He died in May 1998.
