= Fred Herbert (footballer) =

English footballer

Personal information
- Full name: Frederick Herbert
- Date of birth: 26 October 1897
- Place of birth: Warwick, England
- Date of death: 1945 (aged 47–48)
- Position: Inside forward

Senior career*
Years	Team	Apps	(Gls)
1919–1920	Foxford United		
1920–1921	Bedworth Town		
1921–1922	Exhall Colliery		
1922–1929	Coventry City	187	(82)
1929	Brierley Hill Alliance		
Total		187	(82)
- * Club domestic league appearances and goals

Frederick Herbert (26 October 1897 – 1945) was an English footballer who played in the Football League for Coventry City.
