= George Lowrie =

Welsh footballer

Personal information
- Date of birth: 19 December 1919
- Place of birth: Tonypandy, Wales
- Date of death: 3 May 1989 (aged 69)
- Place of death: Bristol, England
- Position: Centre forward

Senior career*
Years	Team	Apps	(Gls)
1937	Swansea Town	19	(3)
1937–1939	Preston North End	5	(0)
1939–1948	Coventry City	56	(44)
1948–1949	Newcastle United	12	(5)
1949–1952	Bristol City	48	(21)
1952–1953	Coventry City	27	(12)

International career
1948–1949	Wales	4	(2)
- * Club domestic league appearances and goals

George Lowrie (19 December 1919 – 3 May 1989) was a Welsh footballer, who played as a centre forward for several clubs, including Coventry City and Newcastle United.

== Playing career ==
Lowrie was born in Tonypandy and started his professional career at Swansea Town in January 1937 before moving on to Preston North End in December 1937. Injuries restricted his appearances for Preston and in the summer of 1939, he was transferred to Coventry City.

He made one League appearance for Coventry in 1939–40 before the league was abandoned due to the outbreak of World War II. During the war, he made nine appearances for Wales, although no caps were awarded for wartime international appearances.

After the cessation of hostilities, he returned to Coventry City and in an explosive two seasons he scored 44 goals in only 56 league appearances, easily making him Coventry's top scorer in both seasons. He also scored 3 FA Cup goals in only two appearances and made four appearances for Wales.

His goal-scoring exploits brought him to the attention of Stan Seymour, who signed him for Newcastle United for a club record fee of £18,500 in March 1948. His final game for Coventry City was on 6 March 1948 at home to Southampton. During the week, Lowrie moved to Newcastle, who again met Southampton in their next game. In both cases, Lowrie was marked by Eric Webber, who prevented Lowrie from scoring. Lowrie was to have "revenge" at the end of the season, however, as Newcastle took the second promotion place ahead of Southampton.

Injuries prevented Lowrie's transferring his goal-scoring skills to Newcastle, who were now playing in Division 1, and in 18 months at the club he only made 12 league appearances, scoring 5 goals, before moving on to Bristol City in September 1949 for a cut-price £10,000.

Playing in the Third Division (South), Lowrie found goal-scoring easier and scored 21 goals in 48 league appearances for Bristol City, before his career was again interrupted by a broken leg. In February 1952 he returned to Coventry City (now relegated to the lowest division) where Lowrie played out his professional career until retiring in 1953.

== Honours ==
- Coventry City Hall of Fame
