= Frank Austin (footballer) =

English footballer

Personal information
- Full name: John Frank Austin
- Date of birth: 6 July 1933
- Place of birth: Stoke-on-Trent, England
- Date of death: 14 July 2004 (aged 71)
- Place of death: Long Eaton, England
- Position: Full-back

Youth career
- 19??–1950: Coventry City

Senior career*
| Years | Team | Apps | (Gls) |
| 1950–1963 | Coventry City | 302 | (2) |
| 1963–1964 | Torquay United | 24 | (0) |
- Chelmsford City
- Brentwood Town
- * Club domestic league appearances and goals

John Frank Austin (6 July 1933 – 14 July 2004) was an English professional footballer. He played as a full-back and represented England as a schoolboy. He was born in Stoke-on-Trent.

Frank Austin began his career as a junior with Coventry City, turning professional in July 1950, although he had to wait until the 1952–53 season for his league debut. His career at Coventry spanned over 12 years and he played a total of 302 league games, scoring twice as Coventry rose through the divisions.

In January 1963 he moved to Torquay United, making his debut on 18 March in a 1–0 defeat away to Newport County, but only as a stand-in for George Allen. He had more success the following season, missing only one of the first 23 games before losing his place to Ray Spencer. He left Plainmoor without making any further appearances and joined non-league Chelmsford City. In the summer of 1965 Frank joined the newly formed semi-professional club Brentwood Town. Brentwood had just joined the Metropolitan League and Frank formed a successful partnership with Dai Jones in the full back position. In his second season appearances were limited due to injury. He was part of the team that won the Metropolitan League Challenge Cup in 1967.
