= List of dual Irish international footballers =

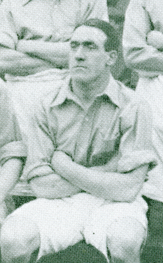
Bill Lacey, one of the earliest dual internationals

Dual Irish international footballers are a group of Irish international association footballers who, between 1908 and March 1950, played for the international teams selected by both the Irish Football Association and the Football Association of Ireland. During this era at least 39 players represented both teams at a senior level.

== Irish FA v FA of Ireland ==
Between 1884 and 1924, Ireland was represented at football by a single national team, selected by the Belfast-based Irish Football Association. However, in 1920, Ireland was partitioned into Northern Ireland and Southern Ireland. The latter eventually became the Irish Free State and then Republic of Ireland. Amid these political upheavals, a rival association, the Football Association of Ireland, was founded in Dublin and from 1924 it organised their own international team – the Irish Free State national football team. In subsequent years both the IFA and the FAI claimed jurisdiction over the whole of Ireland and selected players from the whole island. As a result, between 1924 and 1950, there were in effect two Ireland national football teams chosen by the two rival associations.

Between 1928 and 1946 the IFA was not affiliated to FIFA, giving the FAI team sole FIFA membership over the island, and the two teams co-existed, never competing in the same competition. The IFA XI played in the British Home Championship while the FAI XI competed in both the Olympic Games and the FIFA World Cup. Despite this, however, there were occasions when the teams fixtures clashed and this led to some players having to choose which team to play for. In April 1931 both Tom Farquharson and Peter Kavanagh chose to play for the FAI XI against Spain instead of playing for the IFA XI against Wales. In November 1937 the roles were reversed when Tommy Breen chose to play for the IFA XI in a 1938 British Home Championship game against Scotland on 10 November instead of playing for the FAI XI in a 1938 World Cup qualifier against Norway on 7 November. In 1938 Bill Hayes found himself in a similar position. He was called up by the FAI XI to play against Poland on 13 November. However, he had also been called up by the IFA XI to play against England on 16 November. Like Breen, he chose to withdraw from the FAI selection.

Fixtures played in close proximity also led to some unusual situations. In 1936 Jimmy Kelly had the unique experience of playing for two winning Irish teams within a week. On 11 March he helped the IFA XI beat Wales 3–2 at Celtic Park, Belfast. Then on 17 March he was on the winning side again as the FAI XI defeated Switzerland 1–0 at Dalymount Park. In September 1946 Johnny Carey and Bill Gorman actually played for both Ireland teams against England within three days of each other. On 28 September 1946 at Windsor Park they both played for the IFA XI in a 7–2 defeat. Then on 30 September 1946 at Dalymount Park they both played for the first ever FAI XI to play England. Despite a credible performance, the FAI XI lost 1–0.

Another unusual situation eventually led to the ending of the dual mandate. In 1950 both teams entered the World Cup. On 8 March 1950, in a qualifier against Wales at the Racecourse Ground, the IFA XI included four players – Tom Aherne, Reg Ryan, Davy Walsh and the captain Con Martin – who were born in the Irish Free State. All four players had previously played for the FAI XI in their qualifiers and as a result had played for two different associations in the same FIFA World Cup tournament. This led to FIFA intervention, after complaints from the FAI.

FIFA subsequently restricted players' eligibility based on the political border and in 1953 ruled neither team could be referred to as Ireland, decreeing that for future World Cups, the FAI team be officially designated as the Republic of Ireland, while the IFA team was to become Northern Ireland.

The issue over international eligibility continues to be disputed between the two associations, highlighted in 2007 by the Darron Gibson case. Gibson, who was born in Derry, opted to play for the Republic of Ireland instead of Northern Ireland. The issue was referred to FIFA and has even been discussed in the Northern Ireland Assembly.

== Free State dual internationals ==
The vast majority of the players involved were born in what is now the Republic of Ireland and were selected to play for the IFA XI. The earliest dual internationals - Dinny Hannon, Bill Lacey, Patsy Gallacher, Mick O'Brien, Tom Farquharson, Frank Collins and Ed Brookes – all initially represented the IFA XI before the FAI began organising a team. After 1924 they all went on to play for the FAI XI.

Dinny Hannon became the first ever dual Irish international in 1924 when he played for the Irish Free State at the 1924 Olympic Games, playing against Bulgaria in their first ever senior international on 28 May. He had previously made 6 appearances for the IFA XI between 1908 and 1913.

| Name | (Ireland) IFA XI | | | (Republic of Ireland) FAI XI | | |
| Name | Years | Apps | Goals | Years | Apps | Goals |
|---|---|---|---|---|---|---|
| Dinny Hannon | 1908–1913 | 6 | 1 | 1924 | 2 | 0 |
| Bill Lacey | 1909–1924 | 23 | 3 | 1927–1930 | 3 | 1 |
| Patsy Gallacher | 1919–1927 | 11 | 0 | 1931 | 1 | 0 |
| Ed Brookes | 1920 | 1 | 0 | 1924 | 1 | 3 |
| Mick O'Brien | 1921–1927 | 10 | 0 | 1927–1932 | 4 | 0 |
| Frank Collins | 1922 | 1 | 0 | 1924–1927 | 2 | 0 |
| Tom Farquharson | 1923–1925 | 7 | 0 | 1929–1931 | 4 | 0 |
| Christy Martin | 1925 | 1 | 0 | 1927 | 1 | 0 |
| Jimmy Dunne | 1928–1932 | 7 | 4 | 1930–1939 | 15 | 13 |
| Harry Duggan | 1929–1935 | 8 | 0 | 1927–1937 | 5 | 1 |
| Peter Kavanagh | 1929 | 1 | 0 | 1931 | 2 | 0 |
| Jimmy Kelly | 1931–1936 | 11 | 4 | 1932–1936 | 5 | 2 |
| Alex Stevenson | 1933–1947 | 19 | 5 | 1932–1948 | 7 | 0 |
| Paddy Moore | 1932 | 1 | 0 | 1931–1936 | 9 | 7 |
| Tommy Breen | 1935–1946 | 13 | 0 | 1937–1947 | 5 | 0 |
| Tom Davis | 1936 | 1 | 1 | 1936–1938 | 4 | 4 |
| Kevin O'Flanagan | 1946 | 2 | 0 | 1937–1947 | 10 | 3 |
| Johnny Carey | 1946–1949 | 9 | 0 | 1937–1952 | 27 | 3 |
| Owen Madden | 1937 | 1 | 0 | 1936 | 1 | 1 |
| Bill Hayes | 1937–1938 | 4 | 0 | 1946–1947 | 2 | 0 |
| Bill Gorman | 1946–1948 | 4 | 0 | 1936–1947 | 13 | 0 |
| Paddy Farrell | 1938 | 1 | 0 | 1937 | 2 | 0 |
| Matt O'Mahoney | 1938 | 1 | 0 | 1938–1939 | 6 | 0 |
| Ned Weir | 1939 | 1 | 0 | 1939 | 3 | 0 |
| Billy Walsh | 1944–1948 | 6 | 0 | 1946–1950 | 9 | 0 |
| Davy Walsh | 1946–1950 | 11 | 7 | 1946–1953 | 20 | 5 |
| Tom Aherne | 1946–1950 | 6 | 0 | 1946–1953 | 16 | 0 |
| Peter Farrell | 1946–1950 | 7 | 0 | 1946–1953 | 28 | 3 |
| Tommy Eglington | 1946–1948 | 6 | 0 | 1946–1953 | 24 | 2 |
| Con Martin | 1946–1950 | 6 | 0 | 1946–1956 | 30 | 6 |
| Jackie O'Driscoll | 1948–1949 | 3 | 0 | 1948–1949 | 3 | 0 |
| Rory Keane | 1948 | 1 | 0 | 1948–1949 | 4 | 0 |
| Reg Ryan | 1950 | 1 | 0 | 1946–1953 | 16 | 3 |

== Northern Irish dual internationals ==
Between 1931 and 1946 at least six players from Northern Ireland also played for both teams. From 1924 until 1936, the FAI called their team the Irish Free State and generally just selected players who were born in what is now the Republic of Ireland. However, during this period at least one Northerner, Harry Chatton, also represented the FAI after having previously played for the IFA XI. On 17 March 1936, for the game against Switzerland, the FAI referred to their team as Ireland for the first time and subsequently declared their intention to follow the IFA and select players from throughout the island. In 1937 the FAI's case was strengthened after the introduction of the Constitution of Ireland, and in particular Articles 2 and 3 which declared that the whole of Ireland formed one "national territory".

In 1936 and 1937 several Northerners including, Hugh Connolly, Davy Jordan, John Feenan, Mick Hoy, Tommy Donnelly and Jackie Brown all played for the FAI XI. However of these only Brown ever played for the IFA XI and became a dual international. In June 1946 when the FAI XI toured the Iberian Peninsula the squad included four Northern Irish players - Billy McMillan, Jackie Vernon, Jimmy McAlinden and Paddy Sloan - all of whom had previously played for the IFA XI. Sloan earned the FAI XI a surprise victory when he scored the only goal in a 1–0 win against Spain.

| Name | (Ireland) IFA XI | | | (Republic of Ireland) FAI XI | | |
| Name | Years | Apps | Goals | Years | Apps | Goals |
|---|---|---|---|---|---|---|
| Harry Chatton | 1924–1925 | 3 | 0 | 1931–1934 | 3 | 0 |
| Jackie Brown | 1935–1939 | 10 | 1 | 1937 | 2 | 1 |
| Jimmy McAlinden | 1937–1948 | 5 | 0 | 1946 | 2 | 0 |
| Billy McMillan | 1944–1946 | 4 | 0 | 1946 | 2 | 0 |
| Jackie Vernon | 1944–1951 | 21 | 0 | 1946 | 2 | 0 |
| Paddy Sloan | 1945–1947 | 3 | 1 | 1946 | 2 | 1 |

== Amateur internationals ==
In addition to full internationals, a number of FAI XI internationals also represented the IFA XI at amateur level. In 1931 Fred Horlacher and Jimmy Bermingham both played for an IFA Amateur XI in a 3–1 win against England Amateurs. They played against the wishes of the FAI and were subsequently suspended by the association for three months. Bermingham, who had made his only FAI appearance in 1929, was never capped again, but Horlacher became a regular international during the 1930s.

| Name | (Ireland) IFA Amateur XI | | | (Republic of Ireland) FAI XI | | |
| Name | Years | Apps | Goals | Years | Apps | Goals |
|---|---|---|---|---|---|---|
| Jack McCarthy | 1921 | 2 | 0 | 1924–1930 | 6 | 0 |
| Fred Horlacher | 1931 | 1 | ? | 1930–1936 | 7 | 2 |
| Jimmy Bermingham | 1931 | 1 | ? | 1929 | 1 | 0 |

== After 1950 ==
Since 1950 only one footballer, Alex Bruce, has played for both the Republic of Ireland and Northern Ireland at senior level. However, several people have appeared in Northern Ireland youth matches before switching to the Republic of Ireland where they have appeared in youth and/or senior matches, e.g., Alan Kernaghan, Darron Gibson, Marc Wilson, James McClean, Shane Duffy, Paul George, Eunan O'Kane, etc. Besides Alex Bruce, others have appeared for the Republic of Ireland at youth level and switched to the Northern Ireland system, e.g., Patrick McEleney, Shane McEleney, Johnny Gorman, etc. Tony Kane has played for both associations at youth level, first with Northern Ireland, then the Republic of Ireland, and then back with Northern Ireland.

== See also ==
- FIFA eligibility rules
- List of association football competitions
- List of Republic of Ireland international footballers born outside the Republic of Ireland
