= Braddish =

Braddish may refer to:

- Daniel Braddish, applicant in the Irish Supreme Court case Braddish v DPP
- John Braddish (fl. 2001–2007), a rugby league player - see List of Oldham R.L.F.C. players
- Kim Braddish, morning newsperson on 2Day FM, a radio station broadcasting to Sydney, New South Wales, Australia
- Phil Braddish, English rugby league player - see 2013 North Wales Crusaders season
- Synan Braddish (born 1958), Irish former footballer
- Braddish Billings (1783–1864), early settler in the Ottawa region of Canada
