= Drogheda United F.C. =

Irish association football club

Drogheda United
- Full name: Drogheda United Football Club
- Nicknames: The Drogs; The Boynesiders; Super Drogs; The Claret and Blue Army (supporters)
- Short name: United; DUFC
- Founded: 1919; 107 years ago (as Drogheda United)
- Ground: Sullivan & Lambe Park
- Capacity: 3,500
- Owner: Trivela Group
- Chairperson: Joanna Byrne
- Manager: Kevin Doherty
- League: League of Ireland First Division
- 2026: League of Ireland Premier Division, 9th of 10 (relegated)
- Website: droghedaunited.ie
Home colours	Away colours	Third colours

Drogheda United Football Club is a professional Irish association football club based in Drogheda, County Louth. The club will compete in the League of Ireland First Division in 2027, following relegation from the Premier Division in 2026. They play their home matches at Sullivan & Lambe Park.

The current club is the amalgamation of two former clubs in the town: Drogheda United, a non-league club founded in 1919; and Drogheda F.C., founded in 1962. The clubs merged their operations to form the current club in 1975 and have achieved success since 2005 by winning two Setanta Sports Cups, two FAI Cups, a League Cup and their first league title, the 2007 League of Ireland Premier Division.

From 2021 to 2026, the club competed in the League of Ireland Premier Division, having been automatically promoted as winners of the 2020 League of Ireland First Division.

== History ==
=== 1919–1975: early years ===
Founded in 1919, the original Drogheda United were a non-league club playing junior football in County Louth. The club entered the Dundalk & District League for the 1919–1920 season, and were champions within two years. They initially played their games in Magdalene Park, before moving to the Showgrounds and then finally on to United Park in 1927.

A separate football club called Drogheda F.C. was founded in 1962 and played in Lourdes Stadium. The following year, on 22 June 1963, they were elected to the nationwide League of Ireland when the league was expanded to include twelve teams, up from ten. Unable to finish outside the bottom three during their first four seasons, they achieved a respectable fifth-place in the 1967–68 season. This was followed by a sixth place finish the following season but the club dropped down the table again when the league expanded to include fourteen teams in 1969. The club continued to struggle in the league, finishing in the bottom five in each of the next six seasons and also recording their heaviest league defeat, an 8–1 loss to Cork Hibernians, in the 1970–71 season. They did, however, get to an FAI Cup final that same season where they were beaten 3–0 by Limerick in a replay after the first match ended 0-0.

Chart of yearly table positions for Drogheda United in League of Ireland

=== 1975–2003 ===
In 1975, Drogheda F.C. amalgamated with Drogheda United to form Drogheda United F.C. and the clubs agreed to play out of United Park once the ground had been redeveloped. The 1975–76 season saw an improvement in fortunes on the field as they finished sixth in the league and they also reached the FAI Cup Final for the second time, this time losing 1–0 to Bohemians. For the next three seasons, quite the opposite at what had happened before, they finished in third place. During these seasons Drogheda United also achieved two club records – their biggest league victory (7–1 v Finn Harps) and Cathal Muckian scoring 21 league goals in a season. On 12 August 1979, United Park was officially opened and Drogheda United moved into their new ground, leaving behind their spiritual home of Lourdes Stadium. The club then endured another tough spell in the league finishing in the bottom half for the next five seasons bar the 1982–83 season when they managed to achieve their second highest ever league placing of second-place (they later won the league in 2007) finishing sixteen points behind Athlone Town. They did win their first ever trophy during these seasons also, the League of Ireland Cup in the 1983–84 season.

The 1984–85 season saw the introduction of the League of Ireland First Division to begin the following season with Drogheda United among the four clubs who were relegated from the Premier Division but in this season also Drogheda United entered European Competition for the first time where they were destroyed against Tottenham Hotspur in the UEFA Cup First Round 14–0 on aggregate. They remained in the First Division until the 1988–89 season when they went up as First Division Champions. Their joy was short-lived, however, as the following season they were relegated although this time they achieved promotion at the first time of asking. In the next two seasons Drogheda battled bravely against relegation surviving by one point and on goal difference in the respective seasons. However, they were relegated for the third time in the 1993–94 season.

Drogheda United were very much becoming a yo-yo club, swapping divisions every season between the 1993–94 and 2000–01 seasons when in 2000–01 they finished a disappointing ninth in the ten-team First Division. In 2002–03 they were promoted to the Premier Division under Harry McCue and were there until the 2016 season, as they got relegated in 2015, coming in twelfth place.

=== 2003–2008: Paul Doolin ===
In 2003, McCue was sacked as manager of Drogheda United. Paul Doolin took over and upped the standard of training and fitness levels. However, he found that to compete with the big clubs like Bohemians and Shelbourne he would need a professional squad. In 2004, he made the squad fully professional and gave part-time players the option to turn professional or leave the club. The change to full-time saw the club's fortunes drastically improve. They won their first FAI Cup in 2005, beating Cork City in the final and won back-to-back Setanta Cups in 2006 and 2007.

They also qualified for the UEFA Cup for the 2006–07 season thanks to their 2005 FAI Cup success. This time they fared better than in their first foray into Europe as they defeated HJK Helsinki 4–2 on aggregate in the first qualifying round and were just eliminated 11–10 in the next round against IK Start of Norway. They were also in the UEFA Cup Qualifying stages for the 2007–08 campaign, losing to Helsingborgs IF in the second round.

United finally won the League of Ireland for the first time in 2007, beating Cork City 2–1 at United Park with three games to go. Guy Bates scored the winning goal for Drogheda that day. Drogheda were dominant in the league, only losing three games and winning the title by seven points.

The league win meant that Drogheda would be playing in the Champions League Qualifiers for the first time in their history in the 2008–09 season. They succeeded in their first qualifier against Levadia Tallinn, beating them 3–1 on aggregate. They played the second qualifying round against Dynamo Kyiv which, they ended up losing 4–3 on aggregate.

=== 2008: examinership ===
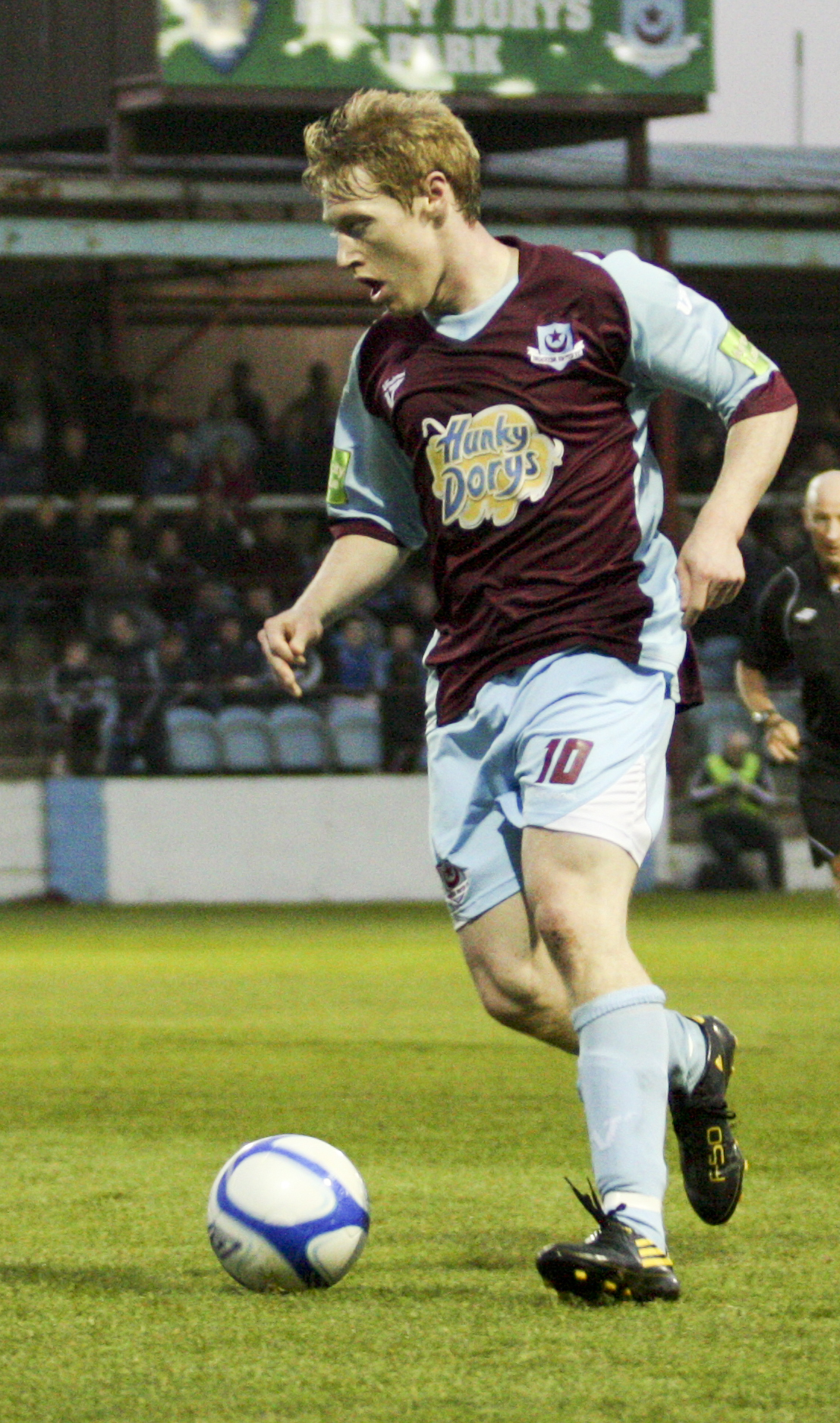
Darragh Hanaphy in action for Drogheda United, April 2011

In October 2008 Drogheda went into examinership, like Cork City, after failing to pay back a €500,000 loan to the Revenue Commissioners and €10,000 rent to Bohemians for their use of Dalymount Park in their Champions League Qualifiers. Their plans for a new €35m stadium fell through and in November 2008 they were deducted 10 points. After successfully raising money through various fund raisers arranged by the supporters, the club escaped extinction on 30 January 2009 when a judge ruled in Drogheda's favour, to the delight of the teary eyed chairman Vincent Hoey.

=== 2009–2010 ===
==== 2009 season ====
In the 2009 season Drogheda got off to a difficult start. Due to bankruptcy, the club went part-time and lost their entire league-winning squad, and manager, Paul Doolin, who took over Cork City. Former Cork and Longford boss Alan Mathews took over. Mathews had to sign a side of semi-pros and free agents. Drogheda were in the bottom half of the table for the whole season, despite some shock wins. On 10 November 2009 they beat Bray Wanderers 2–0 in a relegation play-off.

==== 2010 season ====
The 2010 season was disastrous on and off the pitch. Drogheda started terribly and after a 6–0 loss at the hands of Sligo Rovers on 15 May, Alan Mathews quit his managerial post. The club appointed youth team coach and Drogheda native Darius Kierans as manager even though he had yet to complete his Europa A licence which is an FAI requirement for league managers. After much objection from the FAI, Kierans became Director of Football and the club appointed Paul Lumsden as Interim Manager. Lumsden took the team for only one game before resigning. Brian Donnelly was then appointed as the second Interim Manager of the season but he too resigned in September. On 27 September, the club announced the imminent arrival as manager of another former player – Bobby Browne. Despite finishing rock-bottom of the table with only four wins and nine draws (a total of 21 points) in 2010 and being relegated, Drogheda United were reprieved after the extinction of Sporting Fingal in February 2011.

=== 2011–2013: Mick Cooke ===
==== 2011 season ====
Mick Cooke, manager of Monaghan United, took over as manager on 27 February 2011, becoming the sixth Drogheda manager in nine months. Cooke appointed former Drogs goalkeeper, Robbie Horgan as his assistant, and inherited the players who had been signed by Bobby Browne to play in the First Division so hopes weren't high. After an awful start, Drogheda beat local rivals Dundalk 2–1 in Oriel Park. The win turned their season around and despite operating on the lowest playing budget in the league, Drogheda managed to avoid relegation. Shortly after, Cooke put pen to paper on a new three-year deal with the club.

==== 2012 season ====
In 2012, Cooke and Horgan set about building on the foundations of the previous season. Cooke finally had his own team of players and despite having less than a tenth of the budget that the club had in the glory days under Paul Doolin, Drogheda have had their best season by far since then. Between 1 June and 4 August, Drogheda went on an eight-game winning run in the league and cup – the longest winning run in the club's history. On 23 September 2012, Drogheda won the final of the EA Sports Cup beating Shamrock Rovers 3–1 – their first trophy since 2007. The icing on the cake came on 19 October when Drogheda beat the newly crowned 2012 League Champions Sligo Rovers 2–1 at United Park through a first half Alan McNally header and 88th minute Brian Gannon chip to qualify for the Europa League.

==== 2013 season ====
In 2013, Drogheda reached three finals and despite failing to add to their silverware, reflected the club's rise under Cooke. They were beaten 7–1 in the Setanta Cup final by Shamrock Rovers and 2–0 in the League Cup final by the same opponent. They also reached their first FAI Cup final since winning the competition in 2005, narrowly losing out on a 3-2 thriller against Sligo Rovers. In the Europa League qualifying rounds that season, the club were drawn against Swedish giants Malmö and only lost by a single goal over two legs after a battling performance. Despite this success, Mick Cooke left the club by mutual consent at the end of the season.

=== 2015–2020: First Division ===
==== 2016 and 2017 seasons ====
In November 2015 Drogheda appointed former UCD manager Pete Mahon as manager of the club. John Gill took over as assistant manager with Mark Kinsella ex Irish international remaining part of the coaching staff.

In 2015, Drogheda were relegated after finishing bottom of the league. The following season they finished second in the First Division, achieving promotion through the play-offs, before being relegated again after another 12th-place finish in 2017. In 2018, Tim Clancy was appointed as manager after the departure of Mahon.

==== 2018 season ====
Clancy's first season in charge of the Drogs saw them finish in 4th place, after a rebuild of the squad who were relegated in 2017. It was enough for a place in the playoffs, but despite beating Shelbourne on penalties after 2 legs, Drogheda failed to beat Finn Harps on aggregate, meaning they would remain in the second tier. Harps would go on to win promotion after defeating Limerick 3–0 on aggregate.

==== 2019 season ====
2019 was a bittersweet year for Drogheda. They managed to maintain a close title race with Shelbourne up until the penultimate game of the season, when the Reds beat them 3–1 on home soil to secure the title. A second-place finish granted them a playoff spot yet again, and after a 6–2 aggregate win over Cabinteely, they reached the playoff final, meeting Finn Harps for the second year running. Unfortunately for the Drogs, a late winner from Chris Lyons at United Park was not enough, as they shipped 2 goals in the second leg in Ballybofey, condemning them to playoff heartbreak once again. On 30 October, the club and wider Drogheda community was rocked by the passing of a legendary figure, Vincent Hoey, fondly remembered as "Mr. Drogheda United", former chairman and the man responsible for keeping the club afloat through their years of administration

==== 2020 season ====
Drogheda were pipped as favourites to go all the way in the 2020 season, as Tim Clancy strengthened his team with the additions of former captain Derek Prendergast, as well as Brandon Bermingham, Hugh Douglas and David Odumosu. United opened their season with a 2–0 away win at Cobh Ramblers on 22 February, followed by a 1–0 home loss to Longford Town F.C. 6 days later. They hammered relegated side UCD 5–1 at home on 6 March, and sat top of the table with 6 points when the league was suspended as a result of the COVID-19 pandemic on 12 March. A break of over 3 months would follow, and they finally returned to action with a 2–2 draw to Shamrock Rovers II on 2 August, without spectators. The Drogs only lost 3 games between the months of August and November, and their title race with Bray Wanderers went down to the final day, when they travelled to the Stradbrook to face Cabinteely on 27 October. At the beginning of the evening, Drogheda were 1 point behind their Wicklow counterparts, but a 2–0 win courtesy of goals from James Brown and Luke Heeney meant they would lift the trophy on a historic night which granted them a place in the 2021 League of Ireland Premier Division.

=== 2021–present: Return to the Premier Division ===
==== 2021 season ====
There was little expectation on the newly promoted Drogs team as the 2021 season approached, but this changed when Tim Clancy began his recruitment. The young coach managed to attract the experienced heads of Gary Deegan, Dane Massey, Dinny Corcoran and Ronan Murray, all veterans of the league. Darragh Markey and Daniel O'Reilly also added to an already very youthful and talented group of players. The season was opened on 19 March when Drogheda beat Waterford 1–0 at home. A 4–0 away win against rivals Longford Town on 10 April turned heads the way of the County Louth side, but they had to wait a bit longer for their next 3 points of the campaign, a 7-0 thumping of Waterford's reserve side at the RSC on 8 May. This was followed by a 4-game winning run, including a 3–1 win over Saint Patrick's Athletic on 14 May, a 1–0 away victory at Finn Harps, and a 4–1 home win against Longford. Another impressive performance came when Drogheda won 2–1 against Sligo Rovers at the Showgrounds on 12 June, Chris Lyons scoring a brace. Their surprise victories meant the newly promoted side were pushing for European places deep into the season, when many expected them to be in a relegation dogfight. More good news was to follow in June with the announcement of a legal integration with Drogheda Boys/Girls F.C. This insured the club would have a permanent training base for their senior team and national underage squads, closer to the centre of town. On 20 August, Drogheda pulled off a historic victory over their rivals Dundalk at Oriel Park, the first time they had done so for 9 years, courtesy of a Mark Doyle brace. Just over 2 weeks later, they defeated Bohemians at Head In The Game Park. Their last win of the season came against high fliers Derry City on 24 October. Unfortunately for the Drogs, they finished the season with 3 losses in a row, but it didn't manage to take away from their impressive season, finishing 7th with a respectable 44 points, and making sure of a Premier Division place for 2022

==== 2022-2024 season ====
Drogheda's impressive 2021 campaign meant their squad was practically torn apart by the bigger clubs in the pre season of 2022. Their manager, Tim Clancy, was signed by St Patrick's Athletic. Shelbourne legend Kevin Doherty, who had been assistant manager to Clancy since 2018, assumed the role of first team manager, and former Longford Town coach Daire Doyle joined his management team. Key players such as Killian Phillips and James Brown secured lucrative moves to the UK. Doherty had a big job on his hands to paper the cracks left in his team, but did well to hang on to a number of key players, as well as recruiting others. Drogheda grabbed their first win of the season on 4 March, beating UCD 4–2 at home. On 18 March, Drogheda beat their Louth rivals Dundalk for the 3rd time in 4 games. On 20 May, 10 man Drogheda came back from a 1–0 deficit to beat Finn Harps at home, with 3 goals in the final 20 minutes. They followed this up with a historic home victory over league champions Shamrock Rovers 3 days later, and a 1–1 draw at Dalymount Park against Bohemians on 27 May. On 9 July, Dean Williams scored one of the fastest goals in League of Ireland history, when his 1st-minute strike gave Drogheda their second derby win of the season at home to Dundalk. They secured safety with a 1–0 victory over Bohemians on 7 October, and finished the season in 8th place with 38 points. 2024 saw them collect their second FAI Cup win over Derry City under manager Kevin Doherty and six days later they secured their Premier Division survival with a 3–1 win over Bray Wanderers in the promotion relegation play off. On 16 June 2025, it was confirmed that the club would not be permitted a licence by UEFA to compete in Europe following their FAI Cup win, as their owners the Trivela Group had bought Danish Silkeborg IF after Drogheda had won the trophy, who were also due to compete in the UEFA Conference League, with Trivela not meeting the rules around multi-club ownership, making Drogheda the first ever club to be denied a licence under the ruling, following their failed appeal to the Court of Arbitration for Sport.

== Ownership ==
Drogheda United FC was acquired in late 2023 by USA-based sports investment company Trivela Group.

== The Claret & Blue Club ==
In response to the economic difficulties facing the country, a group of supporters established The Claret & Blue Club in June 2009 with the aim of providing a steady income stream to Drogheda United FC. Supporters who join the Claret & Blue Club donate at least €5 per week to the club, and in return, they receive a membership card entitling them to discounts of up to 10% in a range of local businesses, including restaurants, tile shops, shoe shops and many more. Each member is also entered in a monthly prize draw, with a top prize every month of a sun holiday courtesy of Panorama Holidays. Other prizes include hotel vouchers, tickets to Irish World Cup qualifier games, betting vouchers etc. Publicity on the Derek Mooney Show on RTÉ Radio one and full-page ads in the Drogheda Independent and Drogheda People resulted in a surge of membership, and after only four weeks of existence, the Claret & Blue Club was in a position to bring in over €35,000 to the club annually, with membership figures rising daily. It was hoped that the Claret & Blue Club will take full ownership of the club in 2010 and run the club similar to the way Shamrock Rovers is run by the Shamrock Rovers Members Club. However the target of 500 members was not reached and membership levels settled at just over half that target.

=== Share issue ===
In January 2011, a Claret and Blue Club steering committee announced new plans for a share issue. It was hoped that 200 shares would be sold at €1000 each and that this new revenue would provide stability for 2011–12 and allow the club to finally become a supporter-owned community club. In early 2012 Drogheda United became a member's owned and run club when a new company Drogheda Utd FC Limited was formed consisting of members who paid €1,000 each into the company.

== Emblem ==
Drogheda coat of arms.

The crest of Drogheda United is an adaptation of the town arms of Drogheda, which feature the heraldic symbols of a star and crescent over a shield depicting St. Lawrence's Gate, three lions and a ship. The three lions passant – as Drogheda lay within the Pale and was a besieged garrison town – and the ship represents the town's port. The star and crescent is purported to be taken from King John of England's coat of arms, as the monarch had granted the settlement a town charter in 1210.

In addition to the Drogheda town arms, the star and crescent elements of the club crest are also shared with the Ottoman Empire, who used them as symbols of the Ottoman state. In 1847, the Empire's Sultan Abdülmecid I — whose physician was Irish — sent food aid and £1,000 to Ireland during the Irish Famine. Initially intending to donate ten times that amount, the Ottoman ruler reduced the cash value after a request from British diplomats. At the time, Ireland was under British rule and the request was an attempt by the British monarchy to save face. It is claimed that the Ottoman ruler sent the remaining amount as food instead and evaded a British blockade of Dublin Port to land at the Port of Drogheda. It is further claimed that a desire to honour the Sultan's donation played a part in the inclusion of a star and crescent in the club crest.

Drogheda United shares the same club colours as Trabzonspor in Turkey and in 2010 the two sides officially became sister clubs. In October 2026, the two clubs played a friendly against each other in Turkey.

== Supporters and rivalries ==
'Drogs' is a nickname for supporters of the club. When the name Drogs started to appear in two newspapers in the late 1990s, The Sun and the Drogheda Leader, the club wrote to the Drogheda Leader newspaper demanding that the name not be used adding that it was not used in the stadium by the fans. The newspaper argued that it had not invented the name and that the fans in the "shed side" of the stadium often sing a song called Super Drogs. The club considered the name was degrading and was purely a Drogheda Leader nickname not used by the supporters. In later years, the club officially embraced the nickname.

The most vocal supporters stand on the "shed side" of United Park. They sing football/Drogheda United chants, wear club colours (claret and blue), wave banners and flags and generally try to help lift the team and demonstrate fervent support. One section of their supporters are known as 'F45U' (Famous 45 Ultras).

Drogheda United Supporters Club (DUSC) was formed more than two years ago. Its main aim is to promote Drogheda United F.C. throughout the community. The supporters club works with the football club in various ways including contributing to the match day programme, organising fund raising nights like quizzes and race nights and by organising buses to away matches.

Drogheda United's main rivalry is with their neighbour club Dundalk, with whom they contest the Louth Derby. The club's home grounds lie approximately 35 km apart, and fans regularly travel in their numbers to witness the encounter. Since 2010, Dundalk have had the better share of results, but since Drogheda's promotion from the First Division in 2020, it has been a relatively even encounter, with 5 wins for Dundalk and 4 wins for Drogheda.

Following Dundalk's relegation to the second tier in 2024, Drogheda's nearest Premier Division opponents became Shelbourne. This fixture is usually a fiery encounter due to both teams historically competing in close proximity to each other on the league table, and the number of former Shelbourne players in the Drogheda United camp.

In 2023, Drogheda United became a sister club of Walsall F.C. in England, due to the Trivela Group's shared ownership of both teams. This partnership has seen players like Emmanuel Adegboyega, Freddie Draper, Evan Weir and Douglas James-Taylor moving between the clubs. In July 2024, the teams contested a friendly match at Weavers Park, in which Drogheda won on penalties after a 1–1 draw.

== Honours ==
- League of Ireland Premier Division
  - Champions: 2007
  - Runners-up: 1982–83, 2012
- League of Ireland First Division
  - Champions (5): 1988–89, 1990–91, 1998–99, 2001–02, 2020
  - Runners-up: 1994–95, 1996–97, 2016, 2019
- FAI Cup
  - Champions (2): 2005, 2024
  - Runners-up: 1970–71, 1975–76, 2013
- League of Ireland Cup
  - Champions (2): 1983–84, 2012
  - Runners-up: 2013
- Setanta Sports Cup
  - Champions (2): 2006, 2007
  - Runners-up: 2013
- League of Ireland First Division Shield
  - Champions: 1990–91
  - Runners-up: 1994–95
- Leinster Senior Cup
  - Runners-up: 1982–83, 1985–86
- LFA President's Cup
  - Runners-up: 1970–71
- League of Ireland Shield
  - Runners-up: 1971–72
- Tyler Cup
  - Runners-up: 1979
- President of Ireland's Cup
  - Runners-up: 2025

== European record ==
As of 17 June 2025

=== Overview ===
Competition	Matches	W	D	L	GF	GA
UEFA Champions League	4	2	1	1	6	5
UEFA Europa League / UEFA Cup	12	3	4	5	10	24
TOTAL	16	5	5	6	16	29

=== Matches ===
Season	Competition	Round	Opponent	Home	Away	Aggregate
1983–84	UEFA Cup	1R	(England) Tottenham Hotspur	0–6	0–8	0–14
2006–07	UEFA Cup	1QR	(Finland) HJK Helsinki	3–1 (a.e.t.)	1–1	4–2
2006–07	UEFA Cup	2QR	(Norway) IK Start	1–0	0–1	1–1 (10–11 p)
2007–08	UEFA Cup	1QR	(San Marino) AC Libertas	1–1	3–0	4–1
2007–08	UEFA Cup	2QR	(Sweden) Helsingborgs IF	1–1	0–3	1–4
2008–09	UEFA Champions League	1QR	(Estonia) Levadia Tallinn	2–1	1–0	3–1
2008–09	UEFA Champions League	2QR	(Ukraine) Dynamo Kyiv	1–2	2–2	3–4
2013–14	UEFA Europa League	1QR	(Sweden) Malmö	0–0	0–2	0–2

=== Statistics ===
Graham Gartland has the most appearances for the club in European competitions having appeared a record 12 times in Drogheda's colours in UEFA competitions. He also is tied with Eamon Zayed, on 3 goals, as Drogheda United's leading goalscorer(s) in UEFA competitions.

Finnish international Markus Halsti has played against Drogheda in four matches, lining out with both HJK and Malmö.

Former Drogheda player Gary Rogers previously held the record for most appearances in European competition for an Irish domestic player, lining out 54 times during his stints with St Patrick's Athletic, Sligo Rovers, and neighbouring club Dundalk.

== Records ==
=== Most League goals ===
(Players in bold still playing for Drogheda)

As of 30 October 2026

#	Name	Career	Goals
1	(Republic of Ireland) Declan O'Brien	2001–2008, 2012–2014	88
2	(Republic of Ireland) **Mark Doyle**	2016–2021, 2026–	63
3	(Republic of Ireland) Gel Martin	1972–1986, 1987–1989	52
4	(Republic of Ireland) Damien Byrne	1974–1983	47
5	(Republic of Ireland) Jerome Clarke	1966–1980, 1982–1983	45
6	(Republic of Ireland) Cathal Muckian	1971–1978	40
7	(Republic of Ireland) Chris Lyons	2018–2022	39
8	(Republic of Ireland) Andrew Myler	2002–2004	33
9	(Republic of Ireland) Paddy Dillon	1982–1986	30
10	(Republic of Ireland) Barry O'Connor	1992–1996	29
11	(Republic of Ireland) Denis Stephens	1973–1977	27

=== Other records ===
Most points in a season	68: 2007
Largest league win	8–1: vs Wexford, 16 March 2018
Heaviest league defeat	1–8: vs Cork Hibernians, 30 January 1972
Highest Goalscorer	Declan O'Brien: (108), 2002–2008, 2012–2014
Most League goals	Declan O'Brien: (88), 2002–2008, 2012–2014
Most goals in a season	Cathal Muckian: 21, 1977–1978

== Players ==
=== First-team squad ===
As of 1 November 2026

Note: Flags indicate national team as defined under FIFA eligibility rules; some limited exceptions apply. Players may hold more than one non-FIFA nationality.

No.	Pos.	Nation	Player
1	GK	USA	Luke Dennison
2	DF	IRL	Edwin Agbaje
3	DF	IRL	Conor Kane
4	DF	IRL	Andrew Quinn
5	DF	USA	Leo Burney
8	MF	IRL	Ethan O'Brien
10	MF	IRL	Brandon Kavanagh
11	FW	IRL	Thomas Oluwa
14	FW	IRL	Mark Doyle
15	MF	ENG	Alfie Bates
17	MF	IRL	Shane Farrell
18	DF	IRL	James Bolger

No.	Pos.	Nation	Player
22	DF	IRL	Conor Keeley (captain)
23	DF	USA	Owen Lambe
24	FW	IRL	Warren Davis
25	FW	IRL	Bridel Bosakani
28	MF	IRL	Scott Brady
29	DF	IRL	Seán McCarthy
31	DF	IRL	Kieran Cruise
32	FW	IRL	Daniel Mare
36	GK	IRL	Theo Hennessey
44	GK	ENG	Fynn Talley
—	FW	NGR	Dare Kareem

=== Notable players ===
Senior internationals

- (England) Peter Barnes
- (South Africa) Jethren Barr
- (Scotland) Paul Bernard
- (Republic of Ireland) Synan Braddish
- (Republic of Ireland) Tommy Breen
- (New Zealand) Che Bunce
- (Republic of Ireland) Jerome Clarke
- (Republic of Ireland) Nick Colgan
- (Northern Ireland) John Cowan
- (Republic of Ireland) Miah Dennehy
- (Republic of Ireland) Seamus Dunne
- (Republic of Ireland) Paddy Dunning
- (Republic of Ireland) Stephen Elliott
- (Republic of Ireland) Eamonn Fagan
- (Republic of Ireland) Keith Fahey
- (Republic of Ireland) Mick Fairclough
- (Republic of Ireland) Arthur Fitzsimons
- (Republic of Ireland) Joe Haverty
- (Republic of Ireland) John Herrick
- (Republic of Ireland) Ian Harte
- (Republic of the Congo) Will Hondermarck
- (New Zealand) Lee Jones
- (Republic of Ireland) Gary Kelly
- (Republic of Ireland) Mick Leech
- (Republic of Ireland) Tony Macken
- (Republic of Ireland) Mick Meagan
- (Republic of Ireland) Cathal Muckian
- (Republic of Ireland) Killian Phillips
- (Haiti) Frantz Pierrot
- (Republic of Ireland) Pat Scully
- (Montserrat) Kaleem Simon
- (Republic of Ireland) Peter Thomas
- (Northern Ireland) Danny Trainor
- (Republic of Ireland) Keith Treacy
- (Republic of Ireland) Ray Treacy
- (Republic of Ireland) Ronnie Whelan Sr.
- (Republic of Ireland) Shaun Williams
- (Libya) Eamon Zayed

League of Ireland XI representatives

- (Republic of Ireland) Tommy Breen
- (Republic of Ireland) Killian Brennan
- (Republic of Ireland) Damien Byrne
- (Republic of Ireland) Jody Byrne
- (Republic of Ireland) Jerome Clarke
- (Republic of Ireland) John Coady
- (Republic of Ireland) Billy Dixon
- (Republic of Ireland) John Herrick
- (Republic of Ireland) Paul Keegan
- (Republic of Ireland) Conor Kenna
- (Republic of Ireland) Harry Kenny
- (Republic of Ireland) Ray Keogh
- (Republic of Ireland) John McDonnell
- (Republic of Ireland) Mick Neville
- (Republic of Ireland) David Parkes
- (Republic of Ireland) Gary Rogers
- (Republic of Ireland) John Toal
- (Republic of Ireland) Ray Treacy
- (Republic of Ireland) Anthony Whelan
- (Republic of Ireland) Ronnie Whelan Sr.
- (Republic of Ireland) Shaun Williams

Irish League XI representatives

- (Republic of Ireland) Tommy Breen
- (Republic of Ireland) Damien Byrne
- (Republic of Ireland) Tommy Kinsella

Republic of Ireland B internationals

- (Republic of Ireland) Dan Connor
- (Republic of Ireland) Paul Flood
- (Republic of Ireland) Graham Gartland
- (Republic of Ireland) Mick Meagan
- (Republic of Ireland) Pat Scully

U23 internationals

- (Republic of Ireland) James Chambers
- (Republic of Ireland) Eamonn Fagan
- (Republic of Ireland) Ross Gaynor
- (Republic of Ireland) Paul Keegan
- (Republic of Ireland) Conor Kenna
- (Scotland) Bobby Kennedy
- (Republic of Ireland) Mick Leech
- (Republic of Ireland) Pat Scully
- (England) Derek Stokes
- (Republic of Ireland) Ray Treacy
- (Republic of Ireland) Shaun Williams

U21 internationals

- (Republic of Ireland) Emmanuel Adegboyega
- (Republic of Ireland) Richie Baker
- (Republic of Ireland) Ritchie Bayly
- (Wales) Tony Bird
- (Republic of Ireland) Noel Bollard
- (Republic of Ireland) Synan Braddish
- (Republic of Ireland) Stephen Bradley
- (Republic of Ireland) Killian Brennan
- (Republic of Ireland) James Chambers
- (Republic of Ireland) Dan Connor
- (Republic of Ireland) Nick Colgan
- (Republic of Ireland) Warren Davis
- (Republic of Ireland) Mark Dempsey
- (Republic of Ireland) Stephen Elliott
- (Republic of Ireland) Michael Foley Sheridan
- (Republic of Ireland) David Freeman
- (Republic of Ireland) Luke Gallagher
- (Republic of Ireland) Oisin Gallagher
- (Republic of Ireland) Joe Gallen
- (Republic of Ireland) Jason Gavin
- (Republic of Ireland) Ross Gaynor
- (Republic of Ireland) Brandon Kavanagh
- (Republic of Ireland) Paul Keegan
- (Republic of Ireland) Gary Kelly
- (Republic of Ireland) John Paul Kelly
- (Republic of Ireland) Joe Kendrick
- (Republic of Ireland) Mark Leech
- (Republic of Ireland) John Lester
- (Republic of Ireland) Aidan Lynch
- (Republic of Ireland) Damian Lynch
- (Republic of Ireland) Sean McClare
- (Republic of Ireland) Brendan McGill
- (Republic of Ireland) Stephen Maher
- (Republic of Ireland) Martin Murray
- (Republic of Ireland) Ronan Murray
- (Republic of Ireland) Barry Molloy
- (Republic of Ireland) Barry O'Connor
- (Republic of Ireland) Tony O'Dowd
- (Republic of Ireland) Killian Phillips
- (Republic of Ireland) Neil Poutch
- (Republic of Ireland) Andrew Quinn
- (Republic of Ireland) Joe Redmond
- (Finland) Sami Ristilä
- (Republic of Ireland) Declan Roche
- (Republic of Ireland) Gary Rogers
- (Republic of Ireland) Sean Roughan
- (Republic of Ireland) Pat Scully
- (Republic of Ireland) Brian Shelley
- (Scotland) Neil Tarrant
- (Wales) Josh Thomas
- (Republic of Ireland) Sean Thornton
- (Republic of Ireland) Keith Treacy
- (England) Ray Wallace
- (Republic of Ireland) Anthony Whelan
- (Republic of Ireland) Shaun Williams
- (Wales) Steve Williams
- (Republic of Ireland) Andrew Wogan
- (Republic of Ireland) Eamon Zayed

Republic of Ireland futsal internationals

- (Republic of Ireland) Dane Massey

== Technical staff ==
Position	Staff
Director of Football	Matt Jordan
Head coach	Kevin Doherty
Assistant coach	Daire Doyle
First team coach	Tiernán Mulvenna
Goalkeeping coach	Graham Byas
Physios	Keith Browne
Strength and conditioning coach	Conor Tully

== Managerial history ==
Dates	Name	Honours
1963–1964	(Republic of Ireland) Peter Farrell	
1964–1965	(Republic of Ireland) Mick Lynch	
1965–1966	(Republic of Ireland) Alf Girvan	
1966–1967	(Republic of Ireland) Theo Dunne	
1967–1969	(Republic of Ireland) Arthur Fitzsimons / Theo Dunne	
1969	(Republic of Ireland) Theo Dunne	
1969–1973	(Republic of Ireland) Mick Meagan	
1973–1975	(Republic of Ireland) John Cowan	
1975–1978	(Northern Ireland) Jimmy McAlinden	
1978–1979	(Republic of Ireland) Willie Roche	
1979–1980	(Republic of Ireland) Shay Noonan	
1980–1982	(Republic of Ireland) Ray Treacy	
1982–1985	(Republic of Ireland) Tony Macken	League of Ireland Cup – 1983–84
1985–1986	(Republic of Ireland) Tony Reilly	
1986	(Republic of Ireland) Mick Lawlor	
1987	(Republic of Ireland) Ciaran Maher	
1987–1988	(Republic of Ireland) Arthur Brady	
1988–1989	(Republic of Ireland) Synan Braddish	League of Ireland First Division – 1988–89
1989–1990	(Republic of Ireland) Synan Braddish / Liam Brien	
1990–1992	(Republic of Ireland) Liam Brien	League of Ireland First Division – 1990–91; League Of Ireland First Division Shield – 1990–91
1992–1993	(Republic of Ireland) Pat Devlin	
1993–1996	(Republic of Ireland) Jim McLaughlin	
1996–1997	(Republic of Ireland) Anto Whelan	
1997–1999	(Republic of Ireland) Martin Lawlor	League of Ireland First Division – 1998–99
1999–2000	(England) Eddie May	
2000–2003	(Republic of Ireland) Harry McCue	League of Ireland First Division – 2001–02
2003–2008	(Republic of Ireland) Paul Doolin	FAI Cup – 2005; Setanta Cup – 2006, 2007; League of Ireland – 2007
2009–2010	(Republic of Ireland) Alan Mathews	
2010	(Republic of Ireland) Darius Kierans (interim)	
2010	(Republic of Ireland) Darius Kierans	
2010	(Republic of Ireland) Paul Lumsden	
2010	(Republic of Ireland) Brian Donnelly	
2010–2011	(Republic of Ireland) Bobby Browne	
2011–2013	(Republic of Ireland) Mick Cooke	League of Ireland Cup – 2012
2013–2014	(Republic of Ireland) Robbie Horgan	
2014	(Republic of Ireland) Darius Kierans (interim)	
2014	(Republic of Ireland) Damien Richardson	
2014–2015	(Republic of Ireland) Johnny McDonnell	
2015	(Republic of Ireland) Mark Kinsella	
2015–2017	(Republic of Ireland) Pete Mahon	
2018–2021	(Republic of Ireland) Tim Clancy	League of Ireland First Division – 2020
2021–	(Republic of Ireland) Kevin Doherty	FAI Cup - 2024

== Player of the Year Award ==
=== Supporter's Player of the Year ===
Season	Winner
2025	(Republic of Ireland) Andrew Quinn
2024	(England) Douglas James-Taylor
2023	(Republic of Ireland) Conor Keeley
2022	(Republic of Ireland) Gary Deegan
2021	(Republic of Ireland) James Brown
2020	(Republic of Ireland) Mark Doyle
2019	(Republic of Ireland) Chris Lyons
2018	(Republic of Ireland) Sean Brennan
2014	(Republic of Ireland) Gavan Holohan
2013	(Republic of Ireland) Michael Daly
2012	(Republic of Ireland) Gavin Brennan
2011	(Republic of Ireland) Lee Lynch
2010	(Republic of Ireland) Michael Daly
2009	(Republic of Ireland) James Chambers
2008	(Republic of Ireland) Graham Gartland
2007	(Republic of Ireland) Brian Shelley
2006	(Republic of Ireland) Brian Shelley

=== Club Player of the Year ===
Season	Winner
2025	(Republic of Ireland) Conor Keeley
2023	(Republic of Ireland) Dayle Rooney
2022	(Republic of Ireland) Gary Deegan
2021	(Republic of Ireland) Daniel O'Reilly
2019	(Republic of Ireland) Luke McNally
2014	(Republic of Ireland) Gary O'Neill
2012	(Republic of Ireland) Derek Prendergast
