= Daire Doyle =

Irish football manager and former player

Personal information
- Date of birth: 18 October 1980 (age 46)
- Place of birth: Dublin, Ireland
- Position: Midfielder

Youth career
- 1990–1998: Cherry Orchard

Senior career*
Years	Team	Apps	(Gls)
1998–2001	Coventry City	0	(0)
2001–2003	Kidderminster Harriers	28	(1)
2003–2004	Nuneaton Borough	9	(0)
2004–2005	Moor Green	80	(11)
2005–2006	Redditch United	40	(3)
2006–2007	Bromsgrove Rovers	19	(2)
2007–2008	Longford Town	61	(2)
2009–2013	Bray Wanderers	108	(6)
2014	Drogheda United	32	(0)
2015–2016	Shelbourne	53	(0)
2017	Cabinteely	16	(1)
Total		446	(26)

Managerial career
- 2018–2019: Longford Town (assistant)
- 2019–2021: Longford Town
- 2021–: Drogheda United (assistant)
- * Club domestic league appearances and goals

Daire Doyle (born 18 October 1980) is an Irish former football player who is assistant manager of Drogheda United.

== Early career ==
Doyle started his professional career in August 1998 when he moved from top Dublin schoolboy side Cherry Orchard to then Premier League club Coventry City under manager Gordon Strachan where he played in the youth team, which included playing in the FA Youth Cup Final and was also in the reserve team under Trevor Peake, but struggled for first team opportunities. In the early part of the 2000/01 season, Doyle went on trial with Kidderminster Harriers where he made an immediate impression on manager Jan Molby.

=== Time in England ===
Straight after the trial Molby tried to sign him from Coventry City but Gordon Strachan would not agree to it, however Jan finally got his man in January 2001.

In a two-year stint, Doyle appeared for Harriers 27 times and managed to find the back of the net once. Doyle found himself and fans favourite Ian Foster released by the club at the end of the 2002/03 season.

This prompted a move to Nuneaton Borough where he spent one season before moving on to Moor Green where he spent 18 months scoring 11 goals in 53 starts. At The Moors, Doyle was part of the side which won the Birmingham Senior Cup beating Wolverhampton Wanderers 1–0 in the final at Molineux Stadium. He then moved to Redditch United where he spent another 18 months and in this spell again won the Birmingham Senior Cup before arriving at Bromsgrove Rovers for a brief spell.

=== Longford Town ===
Daire left Bromsgrove Rovers at the beginning of 2007 and was subsequently signed by Longford Town F.C. During his 2-year stint at Longford, Doyle played 61 games scoring 2 goals. During his first season he was part of the side that battled bravely against a six-point penalty deduction but ultimately Longford were relegated to the First Division on the last day of the season. This season also saw a great Cup run which saw Longford reach the FAI Ford Cup Final playing against Cork City, the game ending 1–0 to Cork. Doyle remained at the club upon its return to the First Division and he also captained the side during this period.

=== Bray Wanderers ===
Doyle moved on to Premier Division side Bray Wanderers in January 2009 to link up with Seagulls boss Eddie Gormley and stayed there for five years, where he played 139 games (108 league appearances) and scored 6 goals. Doyle's time at Bray saw him captain the club and also ensure the club retained its top flight status in a number of relegation/promotion play-off games over the 5 seasons. In 2011 season, Bray finished in 6th position which resulted in qualification for the Setanta Cup the following season. Doyle departed the club after the 2013 season in which the club once again remained in the Premier Division after a 5–4 win in the relegation/promotion play-off game against his previous club, Longford Town.

=== Drogheda United ===
On 24 January 2014, Doyle signed for Robbie Horgan's Drogheda United. During the season Doyle proved a popular and adaptable player appearing in 36 games throughout the season and scoring 1 goal in the EA Sports Cup. Doyle played in a number of positions, most notably at right back but also at centre midfield and centre back.

=== Shelbourne ===
Following one year at United Park, Doyle then signed for his former Longford teammate Kevin Doherty's side ahead of the 2015 season. On signing for the club Doyle was immediately installed as captain. He was an influential player throughout the campaign appearing in 28 games. Shelbourne narrowly missed out on the play-off spots, finishing the season in 4th place. In the 2016 season Shelbourne finished in a disappointing 6th position. Doyle was a mainstay throughout playing 27 league games and another 4 games in cup competitions.

=== Cabinteely ===
Doyle spent the 2017 season with Cabinteely F.C. in the role of player-coach. He was also installed as captain of the side in a record-breaking season for the club before retiring from playing.

== Management ==
=== Longford Town ===
Upon leaving Cabo, he immediately returned to Longford Town F.C. to become assistant manager to Neale Fenn ahead of the 2018 season. Following Fenn's departure from the club in August 2019, Doyle became interim manager for the remainder of the 2019 campaign.

On 29 October 2019, he was confirmed as Longford boss for the 2020 season. In his first full season as a manager, Doyle guided 'De Town' to promotion to the Premier Division. Victory over his former side Shelbourne in the play-off on 15 November 2020 secured a return to the top flight for the midlands club. 2021 proved a disappointing season as Longford were relegated from the Premier Division with six games remaining. Doyle left the club by mutual consent on 2 November 2021.

=== Drogheda United ===
On 2 December 2021, Doyle became assistant manager to Kevin Doherty at Drogheda United.
