= Jackie Vernon (footballer) =

Irish footballer

Personal information
- Full name: John Joseph Vernon
- Date of birth: 26 September 1918
- Place of birth: Belfast, Ireland
- Date of death: 24 August 1981 (aged 62)
- Place of death: Belfast, Northern Ireland
- Position: Centre-half

Youth career
- Spearmint
- Dundela

Senior career*
Years	Team	Apps	(Gls)
1937–1947	Belfast Celtic		
1947–1952	West Bromwich Albion	190	(1)
1947	→ Shamrock Rovers (guest)		
1952–1955	Crusaders	44	(1)

International career
1944–1951	Ireland (IFA)	21	(0)
- → Northern Ireland
1946	Ireland (FAI)	2	(0)
1947–1951	Great Britain XI	2	(0)

Managerial career
- 1952–1956: Crusaders
- * Club domestic league appearances and goals

John Joseph Vernon (26 September 1918 – 24 August 1981) also referred to as Jackie Vernon, was an Irish footballer who played for, among others, Belfast Celtic and West Bromwich Albion. Vernon was a dual international and played for both Ireland teams – the IFA XI and the FAI XI. He also played on two occasions for a Great Britain XI. Married to Jean McKillen. Both buried Milltown Cemetery Belfast (Q519B).

== Club career ==
=== Early years ===
Vernon was born in Jocelyn Avenue, Belfast and when he left school he initially entered the family butcher business. He would eventually return to the same trade after retiring as a player. Vernon also played as a junior with both Spearmint and Dundela. His performances attracted the interest of Liverpool but he rejected their approach and opted to sign for Belfast Celtic instead.

=== Belfast Celtic ===
Together with Jimmy McAlinden, Billy McMillan, Tommy Breen and Charlie Tully, he was a prominent member of the Celtic team managed by Elisha Scott. This team dominated the Irish League during the Second World War era. He played his last game for Celtic on 8 February 1947 against Linfield. Both West Bromwich Albion and Glasgow Celtic declared an interest in signing Vernon but the Celtic manager, Jimmy McGrory, would not meet Belfast Celtic's £8,000 valuation.

=== West Bromwich Albion ===
Vernon eventually signed for West Bromwich Albion in February 1947 for a club record fee of £9,500. In 1949 he captained a West Brom team that also included Davy Walsh and Reg Ryan to promotion from the English Second Division. In the same season he also scored his only goal for the club, on Christmas Day in a 1–0 win against Sheffield Wednesday. On 8 June 1947, together with Davy Walsh, Vernon guested for Shamrock Rovers in a friendly against Everton.

=== Crusaders ===
In 1952 Vernon returned to the Irish League and became player-manager at Crusaders, the club that in 1949 had replaced Belfast Celtic in the league. In 1954 he guided the club to victory in the Ulster Cup, their first ever senior trophy. He left the club at the end of that season and returned to the butcher trade.

== International career ==
When Vernon began his international career in 1944 there were in effect, two Ireland teams, chosen by two rival associations. Both associations, the Northern Ireland – based IFA and the Ireland – based FAI claimed jurisdiction over the whole of Ireland and selected players from the whole island. As a result, several notable Irish players from this era, including Vernon played for both teams. In addition Vernon also played twice for a Great Britain XI.

=== IFA XI ===
Between 1944 and 1951, Vernon made 21 appearances for the IFA XI. He made his debut in an 8–4 defeat against a Combined Services XI at Windsor Park on 9 September 1944. This team was basically a Great Britain XI and featured, among others, Matt Busby, Stanley Matthews, Tommy Lawton and Stan Mortensen. During the 1945–46 season he also played in the three Victory internationals. On 27 November 1946 he helped the IFA XI gain a 0–0 draw with Scotland. The draw helped the IFA XI finish as runners-up in the 1947 British Home Championship. Vernon also helped the IFA XI gain some further respectable results, including a 2–0 win against Scotland on 4 October 1947 and a 2–2 draw with England at Goodison Park on 5 November 1947. On 12 May 1951 he also helped the IFA XI gain a 2–2 draw with France. Vernon played his last game for the IFA XI on 20 November 1951 in a 2–0 defeat to England.

=== FAI XI ===
In 1946 Vernon also made 2 appearances for the FAI XI. He was one of several players born in Northern Ireland who benefited from the FAI's attempts to establish an all-Ireland influence. In June 1946 when the FAI organised an Iberian tour, Vernon, together with Jimmy McAlinden, Billy McMillan and Paddy Sloan, was one of four Northern Irish players called up. Vernon subsequently played in both the 3–1 defeat to Portugal on 16 June and then helped the FAI XI gain a 1–0 victory against Spain on 23 June.

=== Great Britain XI ===
On 10 May 1947, Vernon, together with Stanley Matthews, Wilf Mannion, Tommy Lawton and Billy Liddell, played for a Great Britain XI against a Europe XI at Hampden Park. The game was arranged to celebrate England, Scotland, Wales and Ireland rejoining FIFA. On 3 December 1951 at Ninian Park he also captained a Great Britain XI against Wales as the Football Association of Wales celebrated their 75th anniversary.

== Honours ==
=== As a player ===
Belfast Celtic

- Irish League: 1940–41, 1941–42, 1942–43, 1943–44, 1946–47
- Irish Cup: 1941, 1943
- County Antrim Shield: 1942–43, 1944–45

West Bromwich Albion

- Second Division runners-up: 1948–49

Ireland

- British Home Championship runners-up: 1946–47

=== As player-manager ===
Crusaders

- Ulster Cup: 1953–54
