= Robbie Horgan =

Irish former professional footballer (born 1968)

Personal information
- Date of birth: 7 June 1968 (age 58)
- Place of birth: Dublin, Ireland
- Position: Goalkeeper

Senior career*
Years	Team	Apps	(Gls)
1986–1988	Shamrock Rovers	1	(0)
1988–1992	Drogheda United	?	(0)
1992–1994	Shelbourne	1	(0)
1994–2003	Shamrock Rovers	94	(0)
2003–2004	Dublin City	46	(0)
2005–2006	Monaghan United	48	(0)
2007–2008	St Patrick's Athletic	1	(0)

Managerial career
- 2011–2013: Drogheda United (assistant)
- 2014: Drogheda United
- 2016–: Drogheda Town
- * Club domestic league appearances and goals

Robbie Horgan (born 7 June 1968) is an Irish former professional footballer who played as a goalkeeper.

== Career ==
Born in Dublin, Horgan started his career at Shamrock Rovers, making his League of Ireland debut on 14 April 1987. He was the last goalkeeper to play for Shamrock Rovers at Glenmalure Park (Milltown) in a game that decided the League of Ireland B Division title in 1987.

He then moved to Drogheda United in 1988 making his debut on 4 September in a 2–1 home win over Bray Wanderers. He kept 12 clean sheets in 26 league games as Drogheda won the League of Ireland First Division title in 1989. In the 1990/1991 season Horgan kept 15 clean sheets as Drogheda again won the First Division.

After four and a half years at United Park he then moved to Shelbourne in November 1992. He then signed back for Rovers in July 1994 where he spent another eight years. Horgan played in 2 European games for Shamrock Rovers against Djurgårdens IF in the 2002–03 UEFA Cup.

He made his last League of Ireland appearance in the last game of the 2007 League of Ireland season.

Horgan was the goalkeeping coach at Sporting Fingal until they went out of business. Horgan made history in August 2009 when he became the only player to have played at Milltown and Tallaght Stadium.

He went to Drogheda United in February 2011, as an assistant to Mick Cooke. Drogheda won the League of Ireland Cup in 2012.

Cooke left Drogheda in November 2013 and Horgan was confirmed as his replacement shortly afterwards.

== Sources ==
- Dave Galvin; Gerry Desmond. Irish Football Handbook. ISBN 0-9517987-3-1.
