= John Cowan (footballer, born 1949) =

Northern Irish footballer

Personal information
- Full name: John Cowan
- Date of birth: 8 January 1949
- Place of birth: Belfast, Northern Ireland
- Height: 5 ft 9 in (1.75 m)
- Position: Midfielder

Senior career*
Years	Team	Apps	(Gls)
1965–1967	Crusaders		
1967–1973	Newcastle United	9	(0)
1973–1975	Drogheda		
1975–1976	Darlington	10	(0)
–	Scarborough		

International career
1970	Northern Ireland	1	(0)

Managerial career
- 1973–1975: Drogheda United (player-manager)
- * Club domestic league appearances and goals

John Cowan (born 8 January 1949) is a Northern Ireland international footballer who played as a midfielder.

Cowan was born in Belfast, and began his senior career with Irish League club Crusaders before moving to England, where he spent six years with Newcastle United but played only ten first-team matches. Two years as player-manager of League of Ireland club Drogheda preceded a return to England with Fourth Division club Darlington and non-league club Scarborough, but a knee injury forced his retirement at the relatively young age of 27. He played once for his country, against England in the 1970 Home Internationals. After retiring as a player, he set up a sports trophy business in Newcastle upon Tyne.
