= Eamonn Fagan =

Irish former football player

Éamon Fagan
Personal information
- Date of birth: 27 July 1950 (age 76)
- Place of birth: Dublin, Ireland
- Position: Defender

Senior career*
Years	Team	Apps	(Gls)
1970–1975	Shamrock Rovers	116	(3)
1975—1980	Athlone Town	90	(9)
1980—1981	Drogheda United	14	(1)
1981—1982	Shelbourne	6	(0)

International career
1973	Republic of Ireland	1	(0)
1972–1973	Republic of Ireland U23	2	(0)
- * Club domestic league appearances and goals

Éamonn Fagan (born 27 July 1950) is an Irish former footballer.

== Career ==
He played for Shamrock Rovers as a defender between 1970 and 1975. He later moved to Athlone Town A.F.C.

He won his one and only senior cap for the Republic of Ireland national football team on 6 June 1973 in a 1–1 draw with Norway in Oslo, coming on as a 79th-minute substitute for Ray Treacy.

== Sources ==
- McGarrigle, Stephen (1996). The Complete Who's Who of Irish International Football, 1945-96. Edinburgh: Mainstream. ISBN 978-1-85158-894-7.
- Doolan, Paul; Goggins, Robert (1993). The Hoops: A History of Shamrock Rovers. Dublin: Gill & MacMillan. ISBN 0-7171-2121-6.
