= John Feenan =

Irish footballer (1914–1994)

Personal information
- Date of birth: 1 July 1914
- Place of birth: Newry, Ireland
- Date of death: October 1994 (aged 80)
- Place of death: Gloucestershire, England
- Position: Defender

Senior career*
Years	Team	Apps	(Gls)
?–1932	Newry Town		
1932–1936	Belfast Celtic		
1936–1939	Sunderland	28	(0)
1939–?	Shelbourne		

International career
1937	Ireland (FAI)	2	(0)
1940	League of Ireland XI	1	(0)

Managerial career
- 1942–1946: Shelbourne
- * Club domestic league appearances and goals

John Joseph Feenan (1 July 1914 – October 1994) was an Irish and Northern Irish footballer who played for Belfast Celtic, Sunderland and Shelbourne. As an international he also played for Ireland. In the 1940s he served as manager of Shelbourne. He was born in Newry, Ireland.

== Club career ==
=== Early years ===
Feenan began his career with his local team, Newry Town, before moving to Belfast Celtic in 1932 in a transfer deal that also saw Tommy Breen moving from Town to Celtic.

=== Sunderland ===
Feenan made his English League debut for Sunderland on 19 September 1936 in a 4–1 win against Brentford at Roker Park. He made his final league appearance for the club on 6 May 1939 in an away game against Wolverhampton Wanderers which finished as a 0–0 draw. Feenan made 28 league appearances for Sunderland and played one further game for the club in the FA Cup. Among his teammates at the club were Raich Carter and Johnny Mapson.

=== Shelbourne ===
After leaving Sunderland, Feenan returned to Ireland and played for Shelbourne. On 28 April 1940, while at Shelbourne, he played for a League of Ireland XI that also included Paddy Bradshaw, Jimmy Dunne and Johnny Carey, which lost 3–2 to a Scottish League XI at Dalymount Park . Between 1942 and 1946 Feenan also served as Shels manager.

== international career ==
When Feenan played international football in 1937 there were, in effect, two Ireland teams, chosen by two rival associations. Both associations, the Northern Ireland - based IFA and the Irish Free State - based FAI claimed jurisdiction over the whole of Ireland and selected players from the whole island. Feenan was one of several players born in Northern Ireland who benefited from the FAI's attempts to establish an all-Ireland influence.

In 1937, while playing for Sunderland, Feenan won two caps for Ireland. In May of that year the FAI organised a European tour with a squad that included Feenan and two other Northerners, Jackie Brown and Davy Jordan. He made his debut for the FAI XI on 17 May in a 1–0 win against Switzerland. A week later, on 23 May, he also helped the FAI XI defeat France 2–0. These would prove to be Feenan's only international appearances.

== Death ==
Feenan died in Gloucestershire in October 1994 at the age of 80.
