= Jerome Clarke =

Irish former footballer

Personal information
- Date of birth: 15 July 1951 (age 75)
- Place of birth: Drogheda, Ireland
- Position: Forward

Senior career*
Years	Team	Apps	(Gls)
1966–1980	Drogheda	212	(45)
1980–1982	Dundalk	42	(4)
1982–1983	Drogheda United	0	(0)
Total		254	(49)

International career
197?–197?	League of Ireland XI	5	(?)
1978	Republic of Ireland	1	(0)
- * Club domestic league appearances and goals

Jerome Clarke (born 15 July 1951, in Drogheda) is an Irish former footballer.

== Career ==
He played for Drogheda United and won his only cap for the Republic of Ireland national football team when he replaced Johnny Giles 12 minutes from time in a 3–0 friendly defeat to Poland national football team on 12 April 1978 in Łódź.

A striker, he was part of the Drogheda team which reached the 1976 FAI Cup final which they lost 1-0 to Bohemians. After 12 seasons at his home town club he joined rivals Dundalk in July 1980.
