= Jimmy McAlinden =

Irish footballer (1917-1993)

Personal information
- Full name: James McAlinden
- Date of birth: 27 December 1917
- Place of birth: Belfast, Ireland
- Date of death: 25 November 1993 (aged 75)
- Position: Forward

Youth career
- 1934: Glentoran

Senior career*
Years	Team	Apps	(Gls)
1934–1938	Belfast Celtic	?	(?)
1938–1939	Portsmouth	20	(4)
1939–1945	Belfast Celtic	?	(?)
1945–1946	Shamrock Rovers	?	(?)
1946–1947	Portsmouth	33	(5)
1947–1948	Stoke City	33	(2)
1948–1954	Southend United	217	(12)
1954–1955	Glenavon	?	(?)
Total		303+	(23+)

International career
1937–1948	Ireland (IFA)	5	(0)
1946	Ireland (FAI)	2	(0)
1946	League of Ireland XI	1	(0)

Managerial career
- 1954–1967: Glenavon
- 1969–1975: Distillery
- 1975–1978: Drogheda United
- * Club domestic league appearances and goals

James McAlinden (27 December 1917 – 15 November 1993) was an Irish footballer who played as a forward for several clubs, most notably, Belfast Celtic, Portsmouth, Shamrock Rovers and Southend United. As an international, McAlinden also played for both Ireland teams – the IFA XI and the FAI XI. After retiring as a player, he went on to manage Glenavon, Distillery and Drogheda United.

== Club career ==
=== Belfast Celtic ===
In 1934, aged 16, McAlinden was playing for Glentoran Reserves, when after a game against their reserves, he was offered a professional contract by Belfast Celtic. McAlinden, together with Jackie Vernon, Tommy Breen, Billy McMillan and Charlie Tully, subsequently became a prominent member of the Celtic team managed by Elisha Scott. This team dominated the Irish League in the era before and during the Second World War. Among his most notable contributions was scoring in the 2–1 win against Bangor in the 1938 Irish Cup final. After a spell with Portsmouth, McAlinden returned to Celtic in 1939, helping the club to further honours before leaving for Shamrock Rovers in 1945.

=== Portsmouth ===
In December 1938 McAlinden signed for Portsmouth for a fee of £7.500. He made his debut for the club against Chelsea and went onto became a regular in the side. Within six months of his arrival at the club, he helped them win the 1939 FA Cup final, beating Wolves 4–1. After the outbreak of the Second World War, he played three times for Portsmouth in wartime regional leagues, but his first spell with the club ended when he then returned to Belfast Celtic. McAlinden returned to Portsmouth for a second spell in 1946. In September 1947 he left Portsmouth once again and joined Stoke City for a fee of £7,000.

=== Shamrock Rovers ===
Following the end of his second spell with Belfast Celtic and before he rejoined Portsmouth, McAlinden signed for Shamrock Rovers in September 1945. He made his debut against Shelbourne at Milltown on 16 September. While playing for Rovers his teammates included Paddy Coad, Peter Farrell and Tommy Eglington. During his one season with Rovers, McAlinden helped the club reach the 1946 FAI Cup final. However Rovers lost 3–1 to Drumcondra.

=== Stoke City ===
McAlinden joined Stoke City in September 1947 for a then club record fee of £7,000. He became regular inside forward under manager Bob McGrory in 1947–48 playing in 33 matches scoring just twice against Aston Villa and Huddersfield Town. His lack of goals saw him fall out of favour at the Victoria Ground and he was sold to Third Division South side Southend United in October 1948.

=== Southend United ===
In 1948 Southend United signed McAlinden from Stoke City for a fee of £8,000. He continued to play for United until 1954 and during his time with the club he served as club captain. He also became something of a cult hero among the club's fans and is remembered as being possibly the best player ever to play for the club. In 1950, McAlinden was caught up in controversy after it was alleged that he received illegal payments during his second spell with Portsmouth. As a result, he was suspended for the first two months of the 1950–51 season. In April 1954 he made his last home appearance for United in a 4–1 win over Queens Park Rangers.

== International career ==
When McAlinden began his international career in 1937 there were in effect, two Ireland teams, chosen by two rival associations. Both associations, the Northern Ireland – based IFA and the Irish Free State – based FAI claimed jurisdiction over the whole of Ireland and selected players from the whole island. As a result, several notable Irish players from this era, including McAlinden played for both teams.

=== IFA XI ===
Between 1937 and 1948, McAlinden made 5 appearances for the IFA XI, making his international debut in a 1–1 draw with Scotland at Pittodrie Stadium on 10 November 1937. His IFA XI appearances also include the 8–4 defeat against a Combined Services XI at Windsor Park on 9 September 1944. This team was basically a Great Britain XI and featured, among others, Matt Busby, Stanley Matthews, Tommy Lawton and Stan Mortensen. He also played against England in 7–2 defeat at Windsor Park on 9 September 1946. He made his last appearance for the IFA XI on 10 October 1948 in a 6–2 defeat to England at Windsor Park. McAlinden made his first three appearances for the IFA XI while with Belfast Celtic, his fourth while at Portsmouth and his fifth while at Southend United

=== FAI XI ===
In 1946, while with Portsmouth, McAlinden also made 2 appearances for the FAI XI. He was one of several players born in Northern Ireland who benefited from the FAI's attempts to establish their all-Ireland influence. In June 1946 when the FAI organised an Iberian tour, McAlinden, together with Jackie Vernon, Billy McMillan and Paddy Sloan, was one of four Northern Irish players called up. McAlinden subsequently played in both the 3–1 defeat to Portugal on 16 June and then helped Ireland gain a surprise 1–0 victory against Spain on 23 June 1946.

== Coaching career ==
In 1955 McAlinden became player/manager of Glenavon. He continued playing for a further year before finally retiring as a player to concentrate on management. During a thirteen-year spell with Glenavon he guided them two Irish League titles, three Irish Cup victories and one Gold Cup. After leaving Glenavon, McAlinden worked as a full-time scout for Coventry City before taking charge at Distillery in 1969. He subsequently guided a Distillery team that included a young Martin O'Neill to a win in the 1971 Irish Cup. Later in his first season with Drogheda United he guided them to the 1976 FAI Cup final, only to lose 1–0 to Bohemians.

== Career statistics ==
=== Club ===
- Sourced from Jimmy McAlinden at the English National Football Archive (subscription required)

Appearances and goals by club, season and competition
Club	Season	Division	League		FA Cup		Total	
Club	Season	Division	Apps	Goals	Apps	Goals	Apps	Goals
Portsmouth	1938–39	First Division	20	4	6	0	26	4
Portsmouth	1946–47	First Division	32	5	0	0	32	5
Portsmouth	1947–48	First Division	1	0	0	0	1	0
Portsmouth	Total		53	9	6	0	59	9
Stoke City	1947–48	First Division	31	2	2	0	33	2
Stoke City	1948–49	First Division	2	0	0	0	2	0
Stoke City	Total		33	2	2	0	35	2
Southend United	1948–49	Third Division South	29	2	1	0	30	2
Southend United	1949–50	Third Division South	38	1	4	0	42	1
Southend United	1950–51	Third Division South	31	2	1	0	32	2
Southend United	1951–52	Third Division South	42	4	5	0	47	4
Southend United	1952–53	Third Division South	43	3	1	0	44	3
Southend United	1953–54	Third Division South	34	0	2	1	36	1
Southend United	Total		217	12	14	1	231	13
Career Total			303	23	22	1	328	24

=== International ===
National team	Year	Apps	Goals
Ireland (IFA)	1937	1	0
Ireland (IFA)	1938	1	0
Ireland (IFA)	1946	1	0
Ireland (IFA)	1948	1	0
Ireland (FAI)	1946	2	0
Total		6	0

== Honours ==
=== Player ===
Belfast Celtic

- Irish League: 1935–36, 1936–37, 1937–38, 1939–40, 1940–41, 1941–42, 1943–44
- Irish Cup: 1938, 1941, 1943
- Gold Cup: 1934–35, 1939–40, 1940–41, 1943–44, 1944–45
- County Antrim Shield: 1935–36, 1936–37, 1942–43, 1944–45

Shamrock Rovers

- Inter-City Cups: 1946

Portsmouth

- FA Cup: 1938–39

=== Manager ===
Glenavon

- Irish League: 1956–57, 1959–60
- Irish Cup: 1957, 1959, 1961
- Gold Cup: 1956–57

Distillery

- Irish Cup: 1971; runner-up: 1969

Drogheda United

- FAI Cup runner-up: 1976
