= Anthony Whelan =

Irish footballer & manager (born 1959)

Antony Whelan
Personal information
- Date of birth: 23 November 1959 (age 66)
- Place of birth: Dublin, Ireland
- Position: Defender

Senior career*
Years	Team	Apps	(Gls)
1979–1980	Bohemians	25	(4)
1980–1983	Manchester United	1	(0)
1983–1984	Shamrock Rovers	?	(2)
1985–1986	Cork City	22	(4)
1986–1987	Shamrock Rovers	?	(0)
1987–1988	Bray Wanderers	32	(2)
1988–1994	Shelbourne	?	(?)
1994–1996	Dundalk	68	(1)
1996–1997	Drogheda United	?	(?)
1997–1998	Bray Wanderers	14	(0)

International career
1981	Republic of Ireland U21	1	(0)
1986	League of Ireland XI	1	(0)

Managerial career
- 1996–1997: Drogheda United
- * Club domestic league appearances and goals

Anthony Gerard Whelan (born 23 November 1959) is an Irish former soccer player who played during the 1970s and 1980s.

He made his League of Ireland debut for Bohemians on 9 September 1979 and made 25 league appearances (4 goals) and two appearances for Bohs in European competition before transferring to Manchester United in August 1980 for £30,000. After making just one appearance for Manchester United as a substitute for Kevin Moran, he moved to America.

Anto then returned home to sign for Shamrock Rovers in 1983 and won the League in his first season at the club. After a spell at Cork City, he briefly signed back with the Rovers in 1986, where he played once in the European Cup. He made a total of 44 appearances for the Hoops.

He then moved on to Bray Wanderers.

He signed for Shelbourne in 1988, and won the League in 1992 and the 1993 FAI Cup. He won a League title under Dermot Keely at Dundalk in 1994–95, before returning to the Carlisle Grounds to finish his career at Bray Wanderers in the late 1990s.

He had a spell as player/manager at Drogheda United where he guided the club back to the Premier Division in the 1996–97 League of Ireland season.

He earned one cap for the Republic of Ireland U21 side.

== Honours ==
Bohemians

- Leinster Senior Cup: 1979–80

Shamrock Rovers

- League of Ireland: 1983–84
- Dublin City Cup: 1983–84

Shelbourne

- League of Ireland: 1991–92
- FAI Cup: 1992–93

Dundalk

- League of Ireland: 1994–95
