= Jackie Brown (footballer) =

Irish footballer (1914–1990)

Personal information
- Date of birth: 8 November 1914
- Place of birth: Belfast, Ireland
- Date of death: 1990 (aged 75–76)
- Height: 5 ft 7 in (1.70 m)
- Position: Winger

Senior career*
Years	Team	Apps	(Gls)
19xx–1933	William Ewart & Son F.C.		
1933–1934	Belfast Celtic		
1934–1936	Wolverhampton Wanderers	27	(6)
1936–1938	Coventry City	69	(26)
1938–1943	Birmingham	34	(6)
194x–1948	Barry Town		
1948–1951	Ipswich Town	98	(25)

International career
1934	Irish League XI	2	(1)
1935–1939	Ireland (IFA)	10	(1)
1937	Ireland (FAI)	2	(1)
- * Club domestic league appearances and goals

John Brown (8 November 1914 – 1990) was a dual internationalist who played football for both Ireland teams – the IFA XI and FAI XI. He was born in Belfast, Ireland.

== Club career ==
Brown was serving an apprenticeship in the linen trade and playing football for his works team, William Ewart & Son F.C., when he was spotted by Belfast Celtic during the early 1930s. In 1934, while playing for Celtic, he was selected to play for the Irish League XI and he subsequently scored in a 6–1 defeat against an English League XI.

In December 1934, shortly after his 20th birthday, Brown signed for English First Division side Wolverhampton Wanderers, making his debut on 12 January 1935 in a 4–0 win over Notts County in the FA Cup. Although his time at Molineux saw him become an international, he failed to hold down a regular place at club level. He left in October 1936 to join fellow Midlanders Coventry City after just 31 appearances for Wolves (and 7 goals).

He stayed at Coventry for just under two years, making 73 appearances, scoring 29 times. In September 1938 he joined Birmingham and during the final season before the suspension of league football due to World War, 1938–39, he played 34 league games and scored 6 goals. He also played 4 games in the FA Cup and scored 1 goal. He remained with the club during wartime, making a further 28 wartime regional league appearances (scoring 7 times).

As the war ended, Brown was playing for Barry Town. Then in May 1948, aged 33, he signed for Ipswich Town, at the time playing in Division Three South. He made his debut for Town away to Bristol Rovers on 21 August 1948. He subsequently made 106 competitive appearances and scored 27 goals for Town before retiring as a player in June 1951. He made his last appearance for the club against Bristol City on 5 May 1951

== International career ==
When Brown began his international career in 1935 there were, in effect, two Ireland teams, chosen by two rival associations. Both associations, the Northern Ireland – based IFA and the Irish Free State – based FAI claimed jurisdiction over the whole of Ireland and selected players from the whole island. As a result, several notable Irish players from this era, including Brown played for both teams.

=== IFA XI ===
Between 1935 and 1939 Brown made 10 appearances and scored 1 goal for the IFA XI. Within three months of signing for Wolves, he made his international debut for the IFA XI, against England in a 2–1 defeat, on 6 February 1935. He scored his only goal for the IFA XI on 19 October 1935 in a 3–1 defeat to England. Brown played regularly for the IFA XI before the outbreak of the Second World War, making his last appearance on 15 March 1939 in a 3–1 defeat to Wales.

=== FAI XI ===
In 1937, while playing for Coventry City, Brown also made 2 appearances and scored 1 goal for the FAI XI (forerunners of the Republic of Ireland national football team). However injury and controversy denied him the opportunity to add to this total. Brown was one of several players born in Northern Ireland who benefited from the FAI's attempts to establish their all-Ireland influence. He was first called up by the FAI for a game against Germany on 17 October 1936 but he was injured at the time.

In May 1937 the FAI organised a European tour with a squad that included Brown and two other Northerners, Davy Jordan and John Feenan. Brown made his debut for the FAI XI on 17 May in a 1–0 win against Switzerland. A week later, on 23 May, he scored the second goal as the FAI XI defeated France 2–0. This would prove to be his last appearance for the FAI XI. However, in May 1938, for another European tour, the FAI once again called up Brown, together with two other Northerners, Harry Baird and Walter McMillen. However this time the IFA objected and all three players received telegrams from the English FA ordering them not to accept the offer on the grounds they were not born in the Irish Free State.

== Sources ==
- Sean Ryan (1997). The Boys in Green – The FAI International Story.
- Soccer at War – 1939 – 45 (2005): Jack Rollin
