= Mick Cooke (football manager) =

Irish footballer and manager

Personal information
- Date of birth: 14 August 1951 (age 75)
- Place of birth: Dublin, Ireland
- Position: Forward

Team information
- Current team: Newbridge Town

Senior career*
Years	Team	Apps	(Gls)
1970	St Patrick's Athletic	?	(?)
1970–1974	Drogheda United	?	(8)
1974	St Patrick's Athletic	?	(?)
1974–1977	Shamrock Rovers	?	(?)
1977–1978	Bluebell United	?	(?)
1977–1978	Thurles Town	?	(?)
1978–1981	Galway United	?	(?)

International career
1970	Republic of Ireland U19	3	(0)

Managerial career
- 1992–2000: Republic of Ireland Women
- 1999–2002: Shamrock Rovers (assistant)
- 2003–2010: Monaghan United
- 2011–2013: Drogheda United
- 2014: Athlone Town
- 2015–2016: Bray Wanderers
- 2018–: Newbridge Town
- * Club domestic league appearances and goals

Mick Cooke (born 14 August 1951) is an Irish association football manager and former player.

== Playing career ==
A former youths international Cooke played in the qualifiers for Republic of Ireland national under-19 football team in the 1970 UEFA European Under-18 Championship. An inside left he started his career at St Patrick's Athletic He then moved to Drogheda United scoring 8 league goals in four seasons and was their top scorer in 1972/73.

He played in both games of the 1971 FAI Cup Final as Drogheda lost in the replay to Limerick.

The Dubliner was signed by Mick Meagan for Shamrock Rovers later that year, the man who had brought him to Drogheda as a teenager four years earlier.

A former Republic of Ireland national football team youth international in February 1974 Cooke signed for St Patrick's Athletic and was an unused substitute as Pats lost the 1974 FAI Cup final.

== Managing career ==
Cooke managed the Republic of Ireland women's national football team for eight years from 1992, standing down in July 2000 to concentrate on his role as assistant manager of Shamrock Rovers.

Cooke led the U–17 girls to triumph in the Gothia Cup in 1995, beating Taiwan in the final; and, the following year, won the Dana Cup with the U–18's when defeating the State of Texas in the final in America.

One of his last games came against world champions USA in front of 30,500 spectators at the Foxboro Stadium, Massachusetts in September 1999.

He was alongside Damien Richardson from 1999 to 2002 as Rovers finished League of Ireland runners-up and reached two FAI Cup semi-finals.

In 2003, he got his first manager's job in the league at Monaghan United. After seven seasons he took over from Bobby Browne in February 2011 and in the 2011 League of Ireland season he led Drogheda to ninth place and safety in the Premier Division.

He is the first team manager of League of Ireland Premier Division side Drogheda United since taking over 2011.

He took over from Bobby Browne in February 2011 after seven seasons in charge of Monaghan United, and in the 2011 League of Ireland he led Drogheda to ninth place and safety in the Premier Division.

Cooke took over as manager of Athlone Town in November 2013, but left the position in April 2014 after the club lost all of their opening ten league games of the 2014 season.

On 7 July 2015, Cooke took the reins at Bray Wanderers.

=== Allegations of inappropriate behaviour ===
In July 2024, Cooke was publicly alleged to have made sexual advances to women players while a coach.
