= Synan Braddish =

Irish footballer (born 1958)

Personal information
- Date of birth: 9 January 1959 (age 67)
- Place of birth: Finglas, County Dublin, Republic of Ireland
- Position: Midfielder

Youth career
- 19xx–1975: Raven Athletic

Senior career*
Years	Team	Apps	(Gls)
1975–1978	Dundalk	46	(6)
1978–1979	Liverpool	1	(0)
1979–1981	Dundalk	25	(6)
1981–1986	St Patrick's Athletic	116	(10)
1986–1988	Athlone Town	20	(3)
1988–1990	Drogheda United	41	(10)
1990–1991	Kilkenny City	8	(2)
1991–1993	Longford Town	54	(4)

International career
1977–1978	Republic of Ireland U21	5	(0)
1978	Republic of Ireland	2	(0)

Managerial career
- 1988–1990: Drogheda Utd
- * Club domestic league appearances and goals

Synan Braddish (born 27 January 1958) is an Irish former footballer who spent most of his career playing in the League of Ireland, most notably with Dundalk. As an international, Braddish also played for the Republic of Ireland.

== Club career ==
Born in Finglas, County Dublin, Republic of Ireland, Braddish initially played junior football with Raven Athletic in his local Finglas area. During the 1970s this club served as a nursery team for Dundalk and in 1975 they recruited Braddish. Braddish subsequently played five seasons with Dundalk under manager Jim McLaughlin, helping the club win seven trophies including the League of Ireland title in 1976 and the FAI Cup in both 1977 and 1981. His team-mates at the club included, among others, Terry Flanagan, Dermot Keely and Cathal Muckian. Described as an elegant and intelligent midfielder, Braddish scored 17 goals during his time at Dundalk – 12 in the league and 7 in cup competitions. He scored his first goal for the club on 17 August 1975 against Drogheda United in a 2–2 draw in the Donegan Cup. Dundalk eventually won the game 3–1 on penalties. On 6 April 1977 at Dalymount Park, Braddish scored in a 1–0 win against St Patrick's Athletic in an FAI Cup semi-final replay. On 23 January 1978 he scored a hat-trick in the league in a 6–2 win against Shelbourne.

Braddish was on the verge of signing for Los Angeles Skyhawks when in April 1978 he was offered a contract by Liverpool. Together with Derek Carroll and Brian Duff, he was one of three Dundalk players Liverpool signed for a combined fee of £50,000. However, none of the trio managed to get a first team game and all of them subsequently returned to Dundalk. On 29 January 1980 Braddish scored a second hat trick for Dundalk, again against Shelbourne, helping the club to a 9–0 win in the league.

After leaving Dundalk, Braddish went on to play for St Patrick's Athletic for a further five seasons. Among his teammates at this club were Dave Henderson and a young Paul McGrath.

Braddish moved on in 1986 to join Athlone Town. After two seasons with Athlone, he had further spells at Drogheda United, Kilkenny City and Longford Town before finally retiring from the game in 1993.

== International career ==
Braddish represented the Republic of Ireland at schoolboy, youth, amateur and under 21 levels. After an impressive performance in an under 21 international against Northern Ireland in March 1978, he was then called up to the senior squad. He made 2 appearances for the Republic of Ireland, winning both caps in April 1978. He made his senior international debut, under Johnny Giles, on 5 April in a 4–2 win against Turkey. He came on as a late substitute in the 67th minute during a friendly at Lansdowne Road. He then won his second and last cap on 12 April when he started for the Republic in a 3–0 away defeat against Poland.

== Honours ==
=== Player ===
Dundalk F.C.

- League of Ireland: 1975–76
- FAI Cup: 1977, 1981
- League of Ireland Cup: 1977–78, 1980–81
- Leinster Senior Cup: 1976–77, 1977–78

St Patrick's Athletic

- Leinster Senior Cup: 1982–83

=== Manager ===
- League of Ireland First Division
  - Drogheda United- 1988–89
