= Paddy Sloan =

Irish footballer and manager

Personal information
- Full name: Joshua Walter Sloan
- Date of birth: 30 April 1920
- Place of birth: Lurgan, County Armagh, Ireland
- Date of death: January 1993 (aged 72)
- Positions: Right half; inside right

Youth career
- 193?–1937: Glenavon
- 1937–1938: Manchester United

Senior career*
Years	Team	Apps	(Gls)
1938–1939	Manchester United	0	(0)
1939–1946	Tranmere Rovers		
1940–1941	→ New Brighton (guest)		
1942–1943	→ Millwall (guest)		
1943–1945	→ Manchester United (guest)		
1944–1945	→ Fulham (guest)		
1944–1945	→ Bath City (guest)		
1945–1946	→ Brentford (guest)	6	(4)
1946–1948	Arsenal	33	(1)
1947–1948	Sheffield United	12	(2)
1948–1949	Milan	30	(9)
1949	Torino		
1949–1950	Udinese	23	(6)
1950–1951	Brescia	19	(8)
1951–1952	Norwich City	6	(0)
1952–1954	Peterborough United	92	(16)
1954–1955	Rabat Ajax		
1955–1956	Hastings United		
1956	Lockheed Leamington		
1956–1958	Bath City	29	(3)

International career
1945–1947	Ireland (IFA)	3	(1)
1946	Ireland (FAI)	2	(1)

Managerial career
- 1954–1955: Rabat Ajax
- 1956: Lockheed Leamington
- 1956–1958: Bath City
- 1964: South Melbourne Hellas
- 1965: Brunswick Juventus
- Port Melbourne Slavia
- * Club domestic league appearances and goals

Joshua Walter Sloan (30 April 1920 – January 1993), commonly known as Paddy Sloan, was an Irish footballer and manager. Sloan played with English clubs such as Manchester United, Millwall, Fulham and Arsenal. He also featured for Italian sides Milan, Udinese, Torino and Brescia. Sloan as well played with clubs from Northern Ireland, Malta and Australia. He was a dual Irish international footballer as he played for both the IFA XI and the FAI XI. Sloan pioneered the way for the likes of Liam Brady and Robbie Keane by becoming the first Irishman to play in Serie A.

== Club career ==
=== Manchester United ===
Born in Lurgan, County Armagh, Sloan played for local side Glenavon as a youth, but signed for Manchester United in September 1937 aged 17 years old. He featured mainly in the 'A' Team helping them win the Manchester League title in 1938/39. However, although he managed to break through into the Reserves on a handful of occasions, he failed to break into the United first team and on 24 May 1939, at the age of 19, he was transferred to Tranmere Rovers for a fee of £500. During the Second World War, Sloan would return to United as a guest player. Between 1943 and 1945, he made three wartime league appearances and scored one goal for United. In May 1945, Sloan also played for United in both legs of the League North Cup final against Bolton Wanderers. However, United lost the final 3–2 on aggregate.

=== Second World War ===
After signing for Tranmere Rovers, Sloan made his debut for the club against Rotherham United on 26 August 1939. However, shortly afterwards, the Second World War broke out and Sloan joined the RAF. He was subsequently stationed in Canada, where he became a sergeant-pilot. Throughout the war, Sloan remained a Tranmere Rovers player and between 1939 and 1946, he made 22 wartime league appearances and scored 15 goals for the club.

However, Sloan's RAF duties took him all over the country and during the course of the war, he made frequent guest appearances for other clubs. He made one league appearance for Millwall during the 1942–43 season, before then guesting for Manchester United. The 1944–45 season saw him make 11 league appearances and score six goals for Fulham. During the same season, he also played regularly for Bath City and his 18 goals helped them win the League West Cup in 1945. During the 1945–46 season, he made six league appearances and scored four goals for Brentford in the Football League South and then went to Germany on tour with the club. This had been without the consent of his parent club, Tranmere Rovers.

=== Arsenal ===
At the end of the Second World War, Tranmere Rovers were expecting Sloan to return to them. However, his wartime guest appearances had attracted the interest of several clubs including his former club Manchester United and Arsenal. Sloan eventually left Tranmere and in May 1946 to sign for the Gunners without much ado. This was so given the nonexistence of the rivalry between the two clubs at the time. He made his league debut for Arsenal on 31 August in a 6–1 defeat against Wolverhampton Wanderers. During the subsequent 1946–47 season, he made 27 league appearances and scored one goal, establishing himself as a regular in the Arsenal team. He also played a further three games for the club in the FA Cup. However, in the following season, 1947–48, Sloan lost his place to Archie Macaulay and he only made three league appearances as Arsenal went on to win the old First Division in 1947–48 without him. He played his last game for Arsenal in a league game against Portsmouth on 4 October 1947. In February 1948, Sloan left Arsenal and signed for Sheffield United.

=== Italy ===
After only a brief spell with Sheffield United, Sloan joined Milan for the 1948–49 season, and as a result he became the first Irish footballer to play in Serie A. Playing in a team that also included Gunnar Nordahl and Albert Gudmundsson, Sloan went on to score nine goals during the season. The first of these came on 24 October 1948, when he scored the third goal in 3–1 home win against Triestina. On 5 June 1949, in the final game of season, he scored twice in a 3–2 win against Sampdoria. His goals helped Milan finish the season in third place behind Torino and Internazionale. During subsequent seasons, he played for Torino, Udinese and Brescia, before returning to England and signing for Norwich City in December 1951.

== International career ==
When Sloan began his international career in 1945, there were, in effect, two Ireland teams, chosen by two rival associations. Both associations, the Northern Ireland-based IFA and the Ireland-based FAI, claimed jurisdiction over the whole of Ireland and selected players from the whole island. As a result, several notable Irish players from this era, including Sloan, played for both teams.

=== IFA XI ===
Between 1945 and 1947, Sloan made three appearances and scored one goal for the IFA XI. These included two Victory Internationals, played in 1945 and 1946. On 15 September 1945, at Windsor Park, Belfast, he made his debut for the IFA XI in a 1–0 defeat against England. Then, on 4 May 1946, he scored the only goal of the game as the IFA XI defeated Wales 1–0 at Ninian Park. He made his last appearance for the IFA XI in a 2–1 win against Wales on 16 April 1947. Sloan was a Tranmere Rovers player when he played the first two games for the IFA XI, but had transferred to Arsenal by the time he made his last appearance.

=== FAI XI ===
In 1946, while at Arsenal, Sloan also made two appearances and scored one goal for the FAI XI. He was one of several players born in Northern Ireland who benefited from the FAI's attempts to establish their all-Ireland influence. In June 1946, when the FAI organised an Iberian tour, Sloan, together with Jackie Vernon, Billy McMillan and Jimmy McAlinden, was one of four Northern Irish players called up. Sloan subsequently played in both the 3–1 defeat to Portugal on 16 June and then scored the winner as he helped the FAI XI gain a surprise 1–0 victory against Spain on 23 June.

== Coaching career ==
Sloan continued to play football into the mid-1950s with Peterborough United, before he joined up with Rabat F.C. of Malta as a player/coach in 1954. He also had spells as player/coach with both Lockheed Leamington and Bath City before emigrating to Australia as a coach in the Victorian Premier League, to link up at first with South Melbourne Hellas and then Brunswick Juventus. In 1964 he guided Hellas to the league title.

== Honours ==
=== Player ===
Bath City

- League West Cup (1): 1945

=== Manager ===
South Melbourne Hellas

- Victorian Premier League (1): 1964

Port Melbourne Slavia

- Dockerty Cup (1): 1967
