= Jethren Barr =

South African soccer player (born 1995)

Personal information
- Date of birth: 13 September 1995 (age 31)
- Place of birth: Durban, KwaZulu-Natal, South Africa
- Position: Goalkeeper

Team information
- Current team: Drogheda United

Youth career
- Westville United Football Academy
- Escombe FC

Senior career*
Years	Team	Apps	(Gls)
2012–2017	Bidvest Wits	6	(0)
2016–2017	→ Stellenbosch (loan)	10	(0)
2017–2021	Maritzburg United	7	(0)
2021–2023	Portadown	59	(0)
2024	Drogheda United	7	(0)

International career^{‡}
2014–2015	South Africa U20	9	(0)
2023–	South Africa	3	(0)
- * Club domestic league appearances and goals as of 9 May 2024 ‡ National team caps and goals as of 4 January 2024

Jethren Barr (born 13 September 1995) is a South African soccer player who plays as a goalkeeper, most recently for League of Ireland Premier Division club Drogheda United and the South Africa national team. He was the youngest goalkeeper to ever play in South Africa's PSL.

== Club career ==
Barr joined League of Ireland Premier Division club Drogheda United in January 2024. In December 2024 Barr confirmed he would leave the Club.

== International career ==
Barr was called up for South Africa for the 2023 COSAFA Cup, where he made his international debut.

He has been capped three times for the South African national soccer team.

== Honours ==
South Africa U20

- Commonwealth of Independent States Cup: 2015

Drogheda United

- FAI Cup: 2024
