= Tony Macken =

Irish footballer

Personal information
- Full name: Anthony Macken
- Date of birth: 30 July 1950 (age 76)
- Place of birth: Dublin, Ireland
- Position: Right back

Youth career
- Home Farm

Senior career*
Years	Team	Apps	(Gls)
1968–1972	Glentoran		(9)
1972–1974	Waterford	49	(10)
1974–1977	Derby County	23	(1)
1975	→ Portsmouth (loan)	5	(0)
1976	→ Portsmouth (loan)	5	(1)
1976	→ Washington Diplomats (loan)	21	(5)
1977	→ Washington Diplomats (loan)	15	(1)
1977	→ Dallas Tornado (loan)	10	(1)
1977–1982	Walsall	190	(1)
1982–1985	Drogheda United	73	(0)
1985–1987	Waterford United	37	(3)
1987–1988	Home Farm		
Total		428	(32)

International career
1977	Republic of Ireland	1	(0)
- * Club domestic league appearances and goals

Anthony Macken (born 30 July 1950) is an Irish former professional footballer. He was born in Dublin.

== Career ==
Macken was a right back or midfielder who played for Home Farm, Glentoran (1968–1972) and Waterford United F.C. in Ireland before moving to Derby County F.C. in August 1974 for a fee of £30,000. Manager Dave Mackay left Macken in the reserves for the whole of the 1974/75 season.

After a spell on loan at Portsmouth, Macken finally made his league debut on Saturday, 27 December 1975 in a 2–0 win at home to Aston Villa. He again went on loan to Portsmouth in February 1976. His only other appearance for Derby in the season was in a 1–0 loss again against Villa. In all competitions, he made thirty-seven appearances for the Rams, including eight as a substitute before moving to play in America in 1977.

After spells with Washington and Dallas, he returned to England with Walsall in October 1977. He starred in Walsall 1979/80 promotion team and scored once for them in 190 games before returning home to Ireland in June 1982 where he played for Waterford United and Drogheda United. He managed Drogheda United to the League Cup winners in 1983/84. And was assistant manager to Ray Treacy when Shamrock Rovers won the League Championship in 1993/94.

He won his single Republic of Ireland cap – a 1–0 defeat at home to Spain on 9 February 1977.

== Honours ==
=== As a player ===
with Walsall

- Football League Fourth Division runner-up: 1979–80
- Irish League Championship: 2
  - Glentoran - 1969/70, 1971/72
- League of Ireland: 1
  - Waterford - 1973/74

=== As a manager ===
- League of Ireland Cup
  - Drogheda United - 1983/84
