= Tommy Kinsella =

Irish footballer

Personal information
- Full name: Tommy Kinsella
- Date of birth: 1941
- Place of birth: Dublin, Ireland
- Date of death: 6 February 2009 (aged 67–68)
- Position: Winger

Youth career
- 1959–1960: St Joseph's Boys

Senior career*
Years	Team	Apps	(Gls)
1960–1962	Drumcondra	?	(7)
1962–1963	Arsenal	0	(0)
1963—1964	Distillery	12	(4)
1964–1967	Coleraine		
1967–1969	Shamrock Rovers	16	(0)
1967	→ Boksburg (loan)	1	(0)
1967	→ Boston Rovers (loan)	4	(0)
1969–1971	Dundalk	24	(8)
1971—1972	Drumcondra	10	(1)
1972–1977	Dalkey United		
1977–1978	Workmen's Club		

International career
1964	Irish League XI	1	(0)
- * Club domestic league appearances and goals

Tommy Kinsella (1941 – 6 February 2009) was an Irish soccer player who played in the League of Ireland during the 1960s.

== Career ==
Kinsella played for Shamrock Rovers and Bohemians amongst others during his career in the League of Ireland. He also had a spell with Arsenal. Tommy Kinsella was eventually transferred from Drumcondra to Arsenal, during the 1960/61 season, and ended up spending two years at the London club. He played mostly for the reserves, although he scored for the Arsenal first team at Dalymount Park during a match celebrating the new lights.

Joined The Hoops in March 1967 and scored his first goal on 1 October. Went on to make 4 appearances for Rovers in European competition. He also played for Dundalk in Europe, featuring against Liverpool in the 1969-70 Fairs Cup competition.
