= Billy McMillan =

Irish footballer

Personal information
- Place of birth: Carrickfergus, County Antrim, Ireland
- Date of death: 1991
- Place of death: Carrickfergus, County Antrim, Ireland
- Position: Right-back

Senior career*
Years	Team	Apps	(Gls)
1932–1949	Belfast Celtic		
1949–1951	Ballymena United		
1951–1952	Crusaders		

International career
1940–1947	Northern Regional League XI	9	
1944–1946	Ireland (IFA, wartime)	4	(0)
1946	Ireland (FAI)	2	(0)

Managerial career
- 1949–1951: Ballymena United
- * Club domestic league appearances and goals

William McMillan (died 1991) was an Irish footballer who played for Belfast Celtic, Ballymena United and Crusaders. McMillan played for an IFA selection and the senior team of the FAI.

== Club career ==
McMillan joined Belfast Celtic in 1932 and remained with the club until they withdrew from the Irish League in 1949. In 1936 he was a member of the Celtic reserve team that reached the final of the County Antrim Shield, only to lose 1–0 to the senior Celtic team. He subsequently established himself as a regular member of the senior team, playing alongside the likes of Jimmy McAlinden, Jackie Vernon, Charlie Tully, Tom Aherne, Robin Lawler, Jimmy Jones and Johnny Campbell. During the 1930s and 1940s this Celtic team dominated Northern Irish football. During the summer of 1949 McMillan also played with Celtic on their tour of North America. Other members of the touring party included Aherne, Lawler, Campbell, guest player Mick O'Flanagan and manager Elisha Scott. These were the last games Belfast Celtic played before the club disbanded. The highlight of the 10 game tour came on 29 May when Celtic beat Scotland 2–0 at Triborough Stadium. On returning from the tour, McMillan joined Ballymena United as a player manager. In 1951, McMillan signed for Crusaders where he stayed for one season.

== Irish international ==
When McMillan played as an international in 1945 and 1946 there were, in effect, two Ireland teams, chosen by two rival associations. Both associations, the Northern Ireland-based IFA and the Ireland-based FAI selected players from all 32 counties. As a result, several notable Irish players from this era, including McMillan, played for both teams.

=== IFA XI ===
Between 1944 and 1946, McMillan made at least four appearances for the IFA XI. On 9 September 1944 he played in the 8–4 defeat against a Combined Services XI at Windsor Park. This team was basically a Great Britain XI and featured, among others, Matt Busby, Stanley Matthews, Tommy Lawton and Stan Mortensen. McMillan also played in three Victory internationals. On 15 September 1945 he played against England in a 1–0 defeat at Windsor Park. Then on 2 February 1946 he also played in the 3–2 defeat to Scotland, once again at Windsor Park. On 4 May 1946 he made his fourth appearance for the IFA XI in a 1–0 win against Wales at Ninian Park. However, none of the matches he appeared in were considered full internationals.

=== FAI XI ===
In 1946 McMillan also made two appearances for the senior team of the FAI. He was one of several players born in Northern Ireland who benefited from the FAI's attempts to establish an all-Ireland influence. In June 1946 when the FAI organised an Iberian tour, McMillan, together with Jackie Vernon, Jimmy McAlinden and Paddy Sloan, was one of four Northern Irish players called up. McMillan was originally a reserve but replaced the injured Bill Hayes and subsequently played in the 3–1 defeat to Portugal on 16 June and in the 1–0 win against Spain on 23 June.

== Honours ==
Belfast Celtic

- Irish League
  - Winners 1936–37, 1937–38, 1938–39, 1939–40, 1947–48: 5
- Northern Regional League
  - Winners 1940–41, 1941–42, 1943–44, 1946–47: 4
  - Runners-up 1942–43: 1
- Irish Cup
  - Winners 1936–37, 1937–38, 1940–41, 1942–43, 1943–44, 1946–47: 6
- City Cup Winners Cup
  - Winners 1939–40, 1947–48, 1948–49: 3
- Gold Cup
  - Winners 1938–39, 1939–40, 1940–41, 1943–44, 1944–45, 1945–46, 1946–47: 7
- County Antrim Shield
  - Winners 1936–37, 1938–39, 1942–43, 1944–45: 4

Belfast Celtic Reserves

- County Antrim Shield
  - Runners-up 1935–36: 1
