= Davy Jordan =

Irish footballer

Personal information
- Full name: David Jordan
- Date of birth: 12 December 1908
- Place of birth: Belfast, Ireland
- Date of death: 30 November 2006 (aged 97)
- Position: Forward

Senior career*
Years	Team	Apps	(Gls)
1924–1925	Glentoran	2	(0)
19??–19??	Ards		
1925–1936	Hull City		
1936–1937	Wolverhampton Wanderers	3	(0)
1937–1939	Crystal Palace		

International career
1937	Ireland (FAI)	2	(1)
- * Club domestic league appearances and goals

David Jordan (12 December 1908 – 30 November 2006) was a footballer who played as a forward for Wolverhampton Wanderers and Ireland during the 1930s. He also played for Glentoran, Hull City and Crystal Palace.

== Club career ==
Jordan began his professional career in his native Northern Ireland making two appearances over two seasons with Glentoran. He moved to England to join Hull City and in 1932–33 helped Hull gain promotion from Division Three North before transferring to First Division Wolverhampton Wanderers in June 1936. He made his Wolves debut on 17 October 1936 against Black Country rivals West Bromwich Albion. He made only three appearances for the club, all during the 1936–37 season.

He moved to Crystal Palace in May 1937, where he remained until October 1939 when he returned to Ireland.

In 1944, he turned out for a Glentoran Old Boys XI with Glens legends Fred Roberts and Johnny Geary against a Linfield Old Boys XI. The Glens triumphed 4–1 with 2 goals from Roberts, Geary (1) and Jordan (1).

== Ireland international ==
When Jordan played international football in 1937 there were, in effect, two Ireland teams, chosen by two rival associations. Both associations, the Northern Ireland-based IFA and the Irish Free State-based FAI claimed jurisdiction over the whole of Ireland and selected players from the whole island.

In May 1937, the FAI organised a European tour with a squad that included Jordan and two other Northerners, Jackie Brown and John Feenan. Jordan made his debut for the FAI XI on 17 May in a 1–0 win against Switzerland. A week later, on 23 May, after receiving a pass from Jimmy Dunne, he scored the opening goal as the FAI XI defeated France 2–0. Fellow Northerner, Brown scored the FAI XI's second goal. This would prove to be Jordan's last appearance for the FAI XI.
