= Cathal Muckian =

Irish footballer (born 1951)

Personal information
- Date of birth: 30 November 1951 (age 74)
- Place of birth: Dundalk, Republic of Ireland
- Position: Striker

Senior career*
Years	Team	Apps	(Gls)
1971–1978	Drogheda United	97	(40)
1978–1980	Dundalk	49	(14)
1980–1981	Shamrock Rovers	13	(2)
1981	Shelbourne	12	(2)
1981—1982	Athlone Town	15	(4)
Total		186	(62)

International career
1978	Republic of Ireland	1	(0)
- * Club domestic league appearances and goals

Cathal Muckian (born 30 November 1951) was an Irish footballer who played League of Ireland football during the 1970s and early 80s. Muckian played for five clubs, notably Drogheda United and Dundalk FC. In 1978, he was called into the Republic of Ireland national team by John Giles for an international friendly against Poland and won his first and only full international cap.
