= Bobby Browne (footballer, born 1962) =

Irish footballer and manager

Personal information
- Date of birth: 9 June 1962 (age 64)
- Place of birth: Dublin, Republic of Ireland
- Position: Midfielder

Team information
- Current team: Bohemians (manager)

Senior career*
Years	Team	Apps	(Gls)
1983–1984	St Patrick's Athletic	?	(?)
1984–1985	Shamrock Rovers	?	(?)
1984–1985	St Patrick's Athletic	?	(?)
1985–1986	Athlone Town	?	(?)
1986–1993	Shelbourne	?	(?)
1993–1994	Ards	16	(1)
1994–1996	Drogheda United	54	(11)
1996–1997	Dundalk	14	(0)
1997–1998	Drogheda United	6	(0)
1998–2001	Monaghan United	67	(2)

Managerial career
- 1999–2003: Monaghan United
- 2010–2011: Drogheda United
- 2013: Bohemians
- * Club domestic league appearances and goals

Bobby Browne (born 9 June 1962) is an Irish former footballer and manager.

He played in the League of Ireland in the 1980s and 1990s, mainly with Shelbourne.

He played for Shamrock Rovers making three total appearances (two in the league) in the 1984/85 season. Browne made one substitute appearance for The Hoops in the 1984-85 European Cup .

His longest spell was at Shelbourne where he was pivotal when the Reds won the 1991–92 League of Ireland Premier Division scoring 3 goals in 28 appearances.

This win guaranteed Shels entry into the 1992-93 UEFA Champions League where he made another substitute appearance against SC Tavriya Simferopol .

The following season, he won the FAI Cup which guaranteed entry into the 1993-94 European Cup Winners' Cup where Browne appeared as a substitute 3 times at FC Karpaty Lviv , against Panathinaikos in the Olympic Stadium (Athens) and in the return leg .

He signed for Ards F.C. in January 1994 winning the County Antrim Shield but was back in the League of Ireland, this time in the League of Ireland First Division with Drogheda United in November. His good form helped the Boynesiders to promotion and he was named in the PFAI First Division XI for the 1994-95 League of Ireland First Division season. The following season Browne's form earned him the club player of the year award.

Browne signed for Dundalk for the 1996-97 League of Ireland Premier Division season and scored his only goal on his debut in a League of Ireland Cup game on 16 August.

After a season back at Hunky Dorys Park he moved to Monaghan United where he became player/manager in 1999.

Under Browne Monaghan regained promotion to the Premier Division in the 2000–2001 season. He resigned in September 2003 .

Browne was assistant manager of the Republic of Ireland under-23s in 2010.

In October 2010 Drogheda United appointed Browne as manager. Despite finishing bottom of the table in 2010 and being automatically relegated, Drogheda United were given a late reprieve just weeks before the new season when Sporting Fingal were wound up. Finding themselves back in the Premier Division, Bobby Browne was replaced by Monaghan United manager Mick Cooke on 27 February 2011, a week ahead of the first game of the 2011 season.

== Honours ==
=== Club ===
Shelbourne

- League of Ireland Premier Division (1): 1991–92
- FAI Cup (1) 1993

Ards

- County Antrim Shield (1): 1993

=== Individual ===
- Drogheda United Player of the Year (1): 1995–96
