= Braddish v DPP =

Irish Supreme Court case

- Coat of arms of Ireland
- Court: Supreme Court of Ireland
- Full case name: Daniel Braddish v The Director of Public Prosecutions and His Honour Judge Haugh
- Decided: 18 May 2001
- Citations: [2001] 3 IR 127]; [2001] IESC 45]; [2002] 1 ILRM151

Case history
- Appealed from: High Court
- Appealed to: Supreme Court

Court membership
- Judges sitting: Hardiman J; Denham J; Geoghegan J

Case opinions
- Defence access to evidence and the duty to preserve evidence
- Decision by: Hardiman J

Keywords
- Preservation; Duty of Gardaí; Evidence; Fair Procedure; Injunction

Braddish v DPP [2001] 3 IR 127 was an Irish Supreme Court decision that established principles in relation to gathering of evidence. The Supreme Court ruled that "the Gardaí are under a duty to seek out and preserve all evidence bearing on the guilt and innocence of an accused." Daniel Braddish, the applicant, sought a prohibitory injunction against his approaching prosecution for robbery. Video evidence of the alleged crime had been in the possession of the Gardaí but was no longer available. The effort to have the prosecution overturned was refused in the High Court. On appeal, the Supreme Court was satisfied that the Applicant was entitled to the relief sought and accordingly made an order to quash the prosecution.

== Background of the case ==
=== Facts of case ===
On 2 July 1997, a robbery occurred in a shop in Limerick which had been secured by surveillance camera. A Garda examined the tape and he concluded that it demonstrated the robbery in progress, clearly showing Braddish committing the crime. Subsequently, Braddish was arrested and detained under section 4 of the Criminal Justice Act 1984. While in custody, Braddish confessed and signed a statement that he had indeed committed the robbery. He was then released from custody and nine months later charged with the robbery. Braddish was first tried before the Limerick Circuit Criminal Court on 24 March 1999 and a retrial was ordered as the jury could not reach an agreement. The retrial was held before Haugh J on 20 April 1999 where he did not allow evidence in stills taken from the video tape while it was with the Garda. Haugh J prohibited the submission of this evidence because the actual video tape was not presented. Hence, the jury was discharged to save Braddish from being in an unfair situation before the Court. On 14 June 1999, he sought for judicial review on the basis that a continuation of his trial would a breach of his constitutional right to fair trial because the prosecution did not produce original evidence to him.

=== High Court decision ===
The Gardaí had been in possession of a video that showed the alleged crime. However, that evidence was no longer available. The videotape was returned to the shop after Braddish had confessed. Hence, Braddish had sought a prohibitory injunction against his approaching prosecution. Nevertheless, High Court refused such relief because the prosecution was relying on his confession rather than on the videotape. Had prosecution tried to rely on photographic evidence, then there would have been a significant problem as Braddish would not have had the opportunity to contest the evidence put against him. The Judge also took note of when the request for the video tape was made by the Counsel on behalf of Braddish.

The issue before the Court was whether or not there is a need to prevent Braddish's further prosecution solely because the video tape was now unavailable. That piece of evidence was vital as it showed Braddish executing the crime and this was the only evidence available which identified him as the perpetrator. No other identification evidence was presented.

== Holding of the Supreme Court ==
While in Garda custody, Braddish made an inculpatory statement by confessing that he was the culprit in the video tape which was also signed by him. The prosecution's case was based wholly on the alleged confession that was made by Braddish, rather than on the video tape evidence.

It was settled in this case that evidence admissible in relation to guilt or innocence must be preserved, heretofore necessary and practicable, until the judgment of the trial. This same rationale was accepted by Lynch J in the case of Robert Murphy v DPP which the Supreme Court cited and agreed to. Respondents asserted that at core this case was being advanced because of the alleged inculpatory statement made by Braddish. Even if the video tape was produced before the Court, Braddish would not benefit from it anyway and if anything, the only one at a disadvantage with the reintroduction of this tape is the prosecution. Hence, the absence of the video evidence should not be a sufficient ground for him to receive any relief from the Court.

In this case, Braddish pleaded not guilty despite his previous confession to the crime. If Braddish wanted to dispute his previous confession on the grounds that his detention was illegal, then it would be difficult to put forward a persuasive argument without the video evidence as his arrest was made solely on the basis of it. The stills presented before the lower court cannot be used for the purposes of identification evidence. Hardiman J disagreed with the contention that video tape had little importance in this case simply because the prosecution was not depending on it. Also, the confession evidence put forward was being highly contested against as well. It is well known that in matters of confession evidences, it should be used as corroborating evidence and a high reliance on it to convict an accused should be avoided. Besides, the video tape can be a tool to inculpate and exculpate Braddish. The Supreme Court concurred that the video tape should not have been returned and disposed of as it was real evidence of the guilt of the accused.

Hardiman J writing for the Court noted that "it is the duty of the Gardaí, arising from their unique investigative role, to seek out and preserve all evidence having a bearing or potential bearing on the issue of guilt or innocence." However, it was noted by the Court that this duty is not absolute where the evidence is not directly relevant to the case, and will be mitigated by considerations of practicability, feasibility and the availability of resources. Obiter dictum was created which means that where the evidence was not of direct and manifest relevance, then the duty to preserve and disclose had to be interpreted in a fair and reasonable manner on the facts of the particular case. Other pieces of evidence cannot be disposed simply because the argument is being made on the grounds of just one evidence. The destruction of any piece of evidence cannot be justified by saying it is not being used in the case. The Judge said this is because an evidence which the prosecution believes to be irrelevant could be considered to be of importance by the defense. This is why any real evidence should be preserved and disclosed to the defense counsel beforehand. In this case the Garda who disposed the video tape had said he believed the man on tape was Braddish. So, it is difficult to understand why then he did not preserve the evidence instead of getting rid of it. The Court also mentioned that a Garda has no right to destroy an evidence as he pleases. With respect to the time when the video was first requested, Hardiman J asserted that Braddish was not charged until nine months after his arrest and the request was made five months after this. He did not think it is reasonable to hold the request made for video tape against Braddish as there is contradicted evidence that Braddish made a formal request for it on the day he was charged as well. It is illogical to assume that he should have made a request before he was charged as there is no reason for the prosecution to present evidence before an accused is charged. Hardiman J also found that Braddish is entitled to apply for judicial review.

The Supreme Court overturned the High Court judgement and allowed the appeal as the video tape was not presented before the courts.
