= Tommy Breen =

Irish footballer

Personal information
- Full name: Thomas Breen
- Date of birth: 27 April 1912
- Place of birth: Drogheda, County Louth, Ireland
- Date of death: 2 March 1988 (aged 75)
- Height: 5 ft 11 in (1.80 m)
- Position: Goalkeeper

Youth career
- Drogheda Commercials
- Drogheda United

Senior career*
Years	Team	Apps	(Gls)
1929–1932	Newry Town		
1932–1937	Belfast Celtic		
1937–1939	Manchester United	65	(0)
1939–1944	Belfast Celtic		
1944–1946	Linfield		
1946–1947	Shamrock Rovers	11	(0)
1947–1948	Glentoran	14	(0)

International career
1935–1946	Ireland (IFA)	13	(0)
1937–1947	Ireland (FAI)	5	(0)
1932–1946	Irish League XI	8	(0)
1946–1947	League of Ireland XI	3	(0)
1935	Ireland/Wales XI	1	(0)
- * Club domestic league appearances and goals

Tommy Breen (27 April 1912 – 2 March 1988) was an Irish footballer who played as a goalkeeper for, among others, Belfast Celtic, Manchester United, Linfield and Shamrock Rovers. Breen was a dual international and played for both Ireland teams: the IFA XI and the FAI XI.

Breen replaced Elisha Scott as first-choice goalkeeper for both Belfast Celtic and the IFA XI and was rated by Billy Behan, one of his predecessors at Manchester United and a renowned scout, as one of the best goalkeepers Ireland ever produced. He was also the first Manchester United player ever to play for an FAI XI. During his career, Breen was involved in several controversies; in November 1937, he turned down the chance to play for the FAI XI in a 1938 World Cup qualifier to play for the IFA XI in the 1938 British Home Championship. Then, in 1944, he transferred from Belfast Celtic to their rivals Linfield after a financial dispute.

== Sources ==
- The Boys in Green – The FAI International Story (1997): Sean Ryan
- Soccer at War – 1939 – 45 (2005): Jack Rollin
- DUFC A Claret and Blue History by Brian Whelan (2010)
