= List of Coventry City F.C. seasons =

Coventry City Performances from 1919 until 2025

This is a list of seasons played by Coventry City in English and European football, from 1895 to the present day. It details the club's achievements in major competitions, and the top scorers for each season.

== Seasons ==
=== Competition summaries ===
- Pld = Matches played
- W = Matches won
- D = Matches drawn
- L = Matches lost
- GF = Goals for
- GA = Goals against
- Pts = Points
- Pos = Final position

Champions	Runners-up	Promoted	Relegated

Season	League										FA Cup	League Cup^{[A]}	Other Competitions
Season	Level	Division	Pld	W	D	L	GF	GA	Pts	Pos	FA Cup	League Cup^{[A]}	Other Competitions
as Singers F.C.
1894–95	—	B&DL	30	7	5	18	46	91	19	13th			
1895–96	—	B&DL	30	9	2	19	36	68	20	13th	3rd qual round		
1896–97	—	B&DL	30	10	5	15	45	63	25	13th	2nd qual round		
1897–98	—	B&DL	30	13	3	14	50	59	29	7th	1st qual round		
as Coventry City F.C.
1898–99	—	B&DL	34	13	7	14	57	63	33	7th	1st qual round		
1899–1900	—	B&DL	30	6	3	21	47	100	15	16th	1st qual round		
1900–01	—	B&DL	34	10	6	18	63	102	26	14th	3rd qual round		
1901–02	—	B&DL	34	7	6	21	42	97	20	16th	3rd qual round		
1902–03	—	B&DL	34	15	6	13	75	67	36	7th	5th qual round		
1903–04	—	B&DL	34	12	7	15	53	58	31	11th	3rd qual round		
1904–05	—	B&DL	34	9	4	21	51	82	22	17th	3rd qual round		
1905–06	—	B&DL	34	13	6	15	64	61	32	11th	1st qual round		
1906–07	—	B&DL	34	16	4	14	70	58	36	7th	—		
1907–08	—	B&DL	34	18	3	13	97	64	39	4th	1st round		
1908–09	3	SL Div 1	40	15	4	21	64	91	34	20th	5th qual round		
1909–10	3	SL Div 1	42	19	8	15	71	60	46	8th	Quarter Final		
1910–11	3	SL Div 1	38	16	6	16	65	68	38	11th	3rd round		Senior Cup Winners
1911–12	3	SL Div 1	38	17	8	13	66	54	42	6th	2nd round		
1912–13	3	SL Div 1	38	13	8	17	53	59	34	13th	1st round		
1913–14	3	SL Div 1	38	6	14	18	43	68	26	20th	4th qual round		
1914–15	4	SL Div 2	24	13	2	9	56	33	28	5th	6th qual round		
1915–19^{[B]}	—	—	—	—	—	—	—	—	—	—	—		
1919–20	2	Div 2	42	9	11	22	35	73	29	20th	1st round		
1920–21	2	Div 2	42	12	11	19	39	70	35	21st	6th qual round		
1921–22	2	Div 2	42	12	10	20	51	60	34	20th	6th qual round		
1922–23	2	Div 2	42	15	7	20	46	63	37	18th	5th qual round		Senior Cup Winners
1923–24	2	Div 2	42	11	13	18	52	68	35	19th	5th qual round		
1924–25	2	Div 2	42	11	9	22	45	84	31	22nd	1st round		
1925–26	3	Div 3(N)	42	16	6	20	73	82	38	16th	1st round		
1926–27	3	Div 3(S)	42	15	7	20	71	86	37	15th	2nd round		
1927–28	3	Div 3(S)	42	11	9	22	67	96	31	20th	1st round		
1928–29	3	Div 3(S)	42	14	14	14	62	57	42	11th	1st round		
1929–30	3	Div 3(S)	42	19	9	14	88	73	47	6th	3rd round		
1930–31	3	Div 3(S)	42	16	9	17	75	65	41	14th	2nd round		
1931–32	3	Div 3(S)	42	18	8	16	108	97	44	12th	1st round		
1932–33	3	Div 3(S)	42	19	6	17	106	77	44	6th	2nd round		
1933–34	3	Div 3(S)	42	21	12	9	100	54	54	2nd	2nd round		
1934–35	3	Div 3(S)	42	21	9	12	86	50	51	3rd	3rd round		
1935–36	3	Div 3(S)	42	24	9	9	102	45	57	1st	1st round		South Cup Winners
1936–37	2	Div 2	42	17	11	14	66	54	45	8th	5th round		
1937–38	2	Div 2	42	20	12	10	66	45	52	4th	3rd round		
1938–39	2	Div 2	42	21	8	13	62	45	50	4th	3rd round		
1939–45^{[C]}	—	—	—	—	—	—	—	—	—	—	—		
1945–46^{[D]}	—	—	—	—	—	—	—	—	—	—	3rd round		
1946–47	2	Div 2	42	16	13	13	66	59	45	8th	4th round		
1947–48	2	Div 2	42	14	13	15	59	52	41	10th	4th round		
1948–49	2	Div 2	42	15	7	20	55	64	37	16th	3rd round		
1949–50	2	Div 2	42	13	13	16	55	55	39	12th	3rd round		
1950–51	2	Div 2	42	19	7	16	75	59	45	7th	3rd round		
1951–52	2	Div 2	42	14	6	22	59	82	34	21st	4th round		
1952–53	3	Div 3(S)	46	19	12	15	77	62	50	6th	3rd round		
1953–54	3	Div 3(S)	46	18	9	19	61	56	45	14th	1st round		
1954–55	3	Div 3(S)	46	18	11	17	67	59	47	9th	3rd round		
1955–56	3	Div 3(S)	46	20	9	17	73	60	49	8th	1st round		
1956–57	3	Div 3(S)	46	16	12	18	74	84	44	16th	1st round		
1957–58	3	Div 3(S)	46	13	13	20	61	81	39	19th	2nd round		
1958–59	4	Div 4	46	24	12	10	84	47	60	2nd	2nd round		
1959–60	3	Div 3	46	21	10	15	78	63	52	5th	1st round		SP Floodlit Cup Winners
1960–61	3	Div 3	46	16	12	18	80	83	44	15th	3rd round	2nd round	
1961–62	3	Div 3	46	16	11	19	64	71	43	14th	2nd round	1st round	
1962–63	3	Div 3	46	18	17	11	83	69	53	4th	Quarter Final	3rd round	
1963–64	3	Div 3	46	22	16	8	98	61	60	1st	2nd round	3rd round	
1964–65	2	Div 2	42	17	9	16	72	70	43	10th	3rd round	Quarter Final	
1965–66	2	Div 2	42	20	13	9	73	53	53	3rd	5th round	4th round	
1966–67	2	Div 2	42	23	13	6	74	43	59	1st	3rd round	3rd round	
1967–68	1	Div 1	42	9	15	18	51	71	33	20th	4th round	2nd round	
1968–69	1	Div 1	42	10	11	21	46	64	31	20th	4th round	4th round	
1969–70^{[E]}	1	Div 1	42	19	11	12	58	48	49	6th	3rd round	2nd round	
1970–71	1	Div 1	42	16	10	16	37	38	42	10th	3rd round	Quarter Final	Fairs Cup 2nd round
1971–72	1	Div 1	42	9	15	18	44	67	33	18th	4th round	2nd round	Texaco Cup Quarter Final
1972–73	1	Div 1	42	13	9	20	40	55	35	19th	Quarter Final	3rd round	Texaco Cup 1st round
1973–74	1	Div 1	42	14	10	18	43	54	38	16th	5th round	Quarter Final	Texaco Cup 1st round
1974–75	1	Div 1	42	12	15	15	51	62	39	14th	4th round	2nd round	
1975–76	1	Div 1	42	13	14	15	47	57	40	14th	4th round	3rd round	
1976–77	1	Div 1	42	10	15	17	48	59	35	19th	4th round	4th round	
1977–78	1	Div 1	42	18	12	12	75	62	48	7th	3rd round	4th round	
1978–79	1	Div 1	42	14	16	12	58	68	44	10th	3rd round	2nd round	
1979–80	1	Div 1	42	16	7	19	56	66	39	15th	4th round	3rd round	
1980–81	1	Div 1	42	13	10	19	48	68	36	16th	5th round	Semi Final	
1981–82	1	Div 1	42	13	11	18	56	62	50	14th	Quarter Final	2nd round	
1982–83	1	Div 1	42	13	9	20	48	59	48	19th	4th round	3rd round	
1983–84	1	Div 1	42	13	11	18	57	77	50	19th	4th round	3rd round	
1984–85	1	Div 1	42	15	5	22	47	64	50	18th	4th round	2nd round	
1985–86	1	Div 1	42	11	10	21	48	71	43	17th	3rd round	3rd round	FMC SS 1st round
1986–87	1	Div 1	42	17	12	13	50	45	63	10th	Winners	4th round	FMC 2nd round
1987–88	1	Div 1	40	13	14	13	46	53	53	10th	4th round	3rd round	FMC Semi Final; Charity Shield Final
1988–89	1	Div 1	38	14	13	11	47	42	55	7th	3rd round	3rd round	FMC 3rd round
1989–90	1	Div 1	38	14	7	17	39	59	49	12th	3rd round	Semi Final	FMC SS 1st round
1990–91	1	Div 1	38	11	11	16	42	49	44	16th	4th round	Quarter Final	FMC NS 2nd round
1991–92	1	Div 1	42	11	11	20	35	44	44	19th	3rd round	4th round	FMC NS 2nd round
1992–93	1	Prem	42	13	13	16	52	57	52	15th	3rd round	2nd round	
1993–94	1	Prem	42	14	14	14	43	45	56	11th	3rd round	3rd round	
1994–95	1	Prem	42	12	14	16	44	62	50	16th	4th round	3rd round	
1995–96	1	Prem	38	8	14	16	42	60	38	16th	4th round	4th round	
1996–97	1	Prem	38	9	14	15	38	54	41	17th	5th round	3rd round	
1997–98	1	Prem	38	12	16	10	46	44	52	11th	Quarter Final	4th round	
1998–99	1	Prem	38	11	9	18	39	51	42	15th	5th round	3rd round	
1999–2000	1	Prem	38	12	8	18	47	54	44	14th	5th round	2nd round	
2000–01	1	Prem	38	8	10	20	36	63	34	19th	4th round	4th round	
2001–02	2	Div 1	46	20	6	20	59	53	66	11th	3rd round	3rd round	
2002–03	2	Div 1	46	12	14	20	46	62	50	20th	4th round	3rd round	
2003–04	2	Div 1	46	17	14	15	67	54	65	12th	4th round	2nd round	
2004–05	2	Cham	46	13	13	20	61	73	52	19th	4th round	3rd round	
2005–06	2	Cham	46	16	15	15	62	65	63	8th	4th round	2nd round	
2006–07	2	Cham	46	16	8	22	47	62	56	17th	3rd round	1st round	Senior Cup Winners
2007–08	2	Cham	46	14	11	21	52	64	53	21st	5th round	4th round	
2008–09	2	Cham	46	13	15	18	47	58	54	17th	Quarter Final	2nd round	
2009–10	2	Cham	46	13	15	18	47	64	54	19th	3rd round	1st round	
2010–11	2	Cham	46	14	13	19	54	58	55	18th	4th round	1st round	
2011–12	2	Cham	46	9	13	24	41	65	40	23rd	3rd round	1st round	
2012–13^{[F]}	3	FL1	46	18	11	17	66	59	55	15th	3rd round	3rd round	FLT Area Final
2013–14^{[F]}	3	FL1	46	16	13	17	74	77	51	18th	4th round	1st round	FLT 2nd round
2014–15	3	FL1	46	13	16	17	49	60	55	17th	1st round	1st round	FLT Area Semi Final
2015–16	3	FL1	46	19	12	15	67	49	69	8th	1st round	1st round	FLT 2nd round
2016–17	3	FL1	46	9	12	25	37	68	39	23rd	2nd round	2nd round	EFLT Winners
2017–18^{[G]}	4	FL2	46	22	9	15	64	47	75	6th	5th round	1st round	EFLT Group Stage; Tier 4 play-off Winners
2018–19	3	FL1	46	18	11	17	54	54	65	8th	1st round	1st round	EFLT Group Stage
2019–20^{[H]}	3	FL1	34	18	13	3	48	30	67	1st	4th round	2nd round	EFLT 2nd round
2020–21	2	Cham	46	14	13	19	49	61	55	16th	3rd round	2nd round	
2021–22	2	Cham	46	17	13	16	60	59	64	12th	4th round	1st round	
2022–23	2	Cham	46	18	16	12	58	46	70	5th	3rd round	1st round	Tier 2 play-off Final
2023–24	2	Cham	46	17	13	16	70	59	64	9th	Semi Final	1st round	
2024–25	2	Cham	46	20	9	17	64	58	69	5th	4th round	3rd round	Tier 2 play-off Semi Final
2025–26	2	Cham	46	28	11	7	97	45	95	1st	3rd round	2nd round	
2026–27	1	Prem	38										

=== Seasons at each level ===
Information correct up to and including the 2026–27 season.

Level	Seasons	Highest Position	Longest Stretch
1	35	6th (1969–70)	34 (1967 to 2001)
2	35	1st (1966–67, 2025–26)	11 (2001 to 2012)
3	35	1st (1935–36, 1963–64, 2019–20)	11 (1925 to 1936)
4	3	2nd (1958–59)	1 (1914–1915, 1958–1959, 2017–2018)

=== Top goalscorers ===
Season	League		Top goalscorer					
Season	Level	Division	All Competitions	Goals	League Only	Goals	Cups Only^{[I]}	Goals
as Singers F.C.
1894–95	—	—	?	?	—	—	?	?
1895–96	—	—	Tasker	3	—	—	Tasker	3
1896–97	—	—	?	?	—	—	?	?
1897–98	—	—	?	?	—	—	?	?
as Coventry City F.C.
1898–99	—	—	—	0	—	—	—	0
1899–1900	—	—	—	0	—	—	—	0
1900–01	—	—	—	0	—	—	—	0
1901–02	—	—	Gold	1	—	—	Gold	1
1902–03	—	—	W Taplin	5	—	—	W Taplin	5
1903–04	—	—	Walker	1	—	—	Walker	1
1904–05	—	—	(England) Herbert Banks	3	—	—	(England) Herbert Banks	3
1905–06	—	—	—	0	—	—	—	0
1906–07	—	—	—	—	—	—	—	—
1907–08	—	—	(England) Albert E. Lewis	8	—	—	(England) Albert E. Lewis	8
1908–09	3	SL Div 1	(Northern Ireland) Harold Redmond Buckle	17				
1909–10	3	SL Div 1	(Northern Ireland) Harold Redmond Buckle	19				
1910–11	3	SL Div 1	(England) Harold Parkes	12				
1911–12	3	SL Div 1	(England) Fred Jones	22				
1912–13	3	SL Div 1	(England) Harold Parkes	13				
1913–14	3	SL Div 1	(England) George A. Davison	19				
1914–15	4	SL Div 2	(England) John Allan	21				
1915–19^{[B]}	—	—	—	—	—	—	—	—
1919–20	2	Div 2	(England) Richard Parker	9				
1920–21	2	Div 2	(England) Billy Morgan	7				
1921–22	2	Div 2	(England) Sammy Stevens	22				
1922–23	2	Div 2	(England) William Toms	18				
1923–24	2	Div 2	(Scotland) Hugh Richmond	14				
1924–25	2	Div 2	(England) Albert Pynegar	17				
1925–26	3	Div 3(N)	(Scotland) Bill Paterson	25				
1926–27	3	Div 3(S)	(England) Fred Herbert	26				
1927–28	3	Div 3(S)	(England) Jimmy Heathcote	15				
1928–29	3	Div 3(S)	(England) Ernest Toseland	11				
1929–30	3	Div 3(S)	(England) Jimmy Loughlin	30				
1930–31	3	Div 3(S)	(England) William Lake	24				
1931–32	3	Div 3(S)	(England) Clarrie Bourton	50				
1932–33	3	Div 3(S)	(England) Clarrie Bourton	43				
1933–34	3	Div 3(S)	(England) Clarrie Bourton	25				
1934–35	3	Div 3(S)	(Wales) Leslie Jones	30				
1935–36	3	Div 3(S)	(England) Clarrie Bourton	26				
1936–37	2	Div 2	(Northern Ireland) Jackie Brown	14				
1937–38	2	Div 2	(Northern Ireland) Jackie Brown	15				
1938–39	2	Div 2	(Scotland) Tom Crawley	14				
1939–45^{[C]}	—	—	—	—	—	—	—	—
1945–46^{[D]}	—	—	(England) Harry Barratt	1	—	—	(England) Harry Barratt	1
1946–47	2	Div 2	(Wales) George Lowrie	29				
1947–48	2	Div 2	(Wales) George Lowrie	18				
1948–49	2	Div 2	(England) Ted Roberts	19				
1949–50	2	Div 2	(England) Peter Murphy	15				
1950–51	2	Div 2	(Scotland) Ken Chisholm	24				
1951–52	2	Div 2	(Northern Ireland) Norman Lockhart	17				
1952–53	3	Div 3(S)	(England) Eddy Brown	19				
1953–54	3	Div 3(S)	(England) Eddy Brown	20				
1954–55	3	Div 3(S)	(England) Tommy Capel	22				
1955–56	3	Div 3(S)	(England) Dennis Uphill	13				
1956–57	3	Div 3(S)	(England) Ken McPherson	23				
1957–58	3	Div 3(S)	(England) Ray Straw	14				
1958–59	4	Div 4	(England) Ray Straw	30	(England) Ray Straw	27	(England) Ray Straw	3
1959–60	3	Div 3	(England) Ray Straw	21	(England) Ray Straw	20	(England) Alan Daley (England) Ray Straw	1
1960–61	3	Div 3	(England) Ray Straw	20	(England) Ray Straw	18	(England) Bill Myerscough	4
1961–62	3	Div 3	(England) Mike Dixon	12	(England) Mike Dixon	12	(Wales) Ron Hewitt (England) Ken Satchwell	1
1962–63	3	Div 3	(England) Terry Bly	29	(England) Terry Bly	25	(England) Jimmy Whitehouse	7
1963–64	3	Div 3	(England) George Hudson	28	(England) George Hudson	24	(England) George Hudson	4
1964–65	2	Div 2	(England) George Hudson	24	(England) George Hudson	19	(England) George Hudson	5
1965–66	2	Div 2	(England) George Hudson	17	(England) George Hudson	13	(England) George Hudson	4
1966–67	2	Div 2	(England) Bobby Gould	25	(England) Bobby Gould	24	(Wales) Ronnie Rees	2
1967–68	1	Div 1	(Wales) Ronnie Rees	9	(England) Bobby Gould (Scotland) Neil Martin (Wales) Ronnie Rees	8	(United States) Gerry Baker (Scotland) Willie Carr (Scotland) Ernie Hannigan (England) Ernie Machin (Wales) Ronnie Rees	1
1968–69	1	Div 1	(England) Ernie Hunt	13	(England) Ernie Hunt	11	(England) Ernie Hunt (England) John Tudor	2
1969–70	1	Div 1	(Scotland) Neil Martin	15	(Scotland) Neil Martin	14	(Scotland) Neil Martin	1
1970–71	1	Div 1	(England) Ernie Hunt (Scotland) Neil Martin	13	(England) Ernie Hunt	10	(England) John O'Rourke	6
1971–72	1	Div 1	(England) Ernie Hunt	12	(England) Ernie Hunt	12	(England) Chris Chilton (Scotland) Billy Rafferty	1
1972–73	1	Div 1	(Scotland) Brian Alderson	17	(Scotland) Brian Alderson	13	(Scotland) Brian Alderson	4
1973–74	1	Div 1	(Scotland) Brian Alderson	15	(Scotland) Brian Alderson	9	(Scotland) Brian Alderson	6
1974–75	1	Div 1	(Scotland) Brian Alderson (England) David Cross	8	(England) David Cross	8	(Scotland) Brian Alderson	2
1975–76	1	Div 1	(England) David Cross	16	(England) David Cross	14	(England) David Cross	2
1976–77	1	Div 1	(England) Mick Ferguson	15	(England) Mick Ferguson	13	(England) Mick Ferguson	2
1977–78	1	Div 1	(Scotland) Ian Wallace	23	(Scotland) Ian Wallace	21	(England) Barry Powell (Scotland) Ian Wallace	2
1978–79	1	Div 1	(Scotland) Ian Wallace	15	(Scotland) Ian Wallace	15	(Scotland) Andy Blair (United States) Alan Green (England) Garry Thompson	1
1979–80	1	Div 1	(Scotland) Ian Wallace	13	(Scotland) Ian Wallace	13	(England) Tommy English	2
1980–81	1	Div 1	(England) Garry Thompson	15	(Republic of Ireland) Gerry Daly (England) Garry Thompson	8	(England) Garry Thompson	7
1981–82	1	Div 1	(England) Mark Hateley	18	(England) Mark Hateley	13	(England) Mark Hateley	5
1982–83	1	Div 1	(England) Steve Whitton	14	(England) Steve Whitton	12	(England) Mark Hateley (Scotland) Jim Melrose (England) Steve Whitton	2
1983–84	1	Div 1	(England) Terry Gibson	19	(England) Terry Gibson	17	(England) Graham Withey	3
1984–85	1	Div 1	(England) Terry Gibson	19	(England) Terry Gibson	15	(England) Terry Gibson	4
1985–86	1	Div 1	(England) Terry Gibson	13	(England) Terry Gibson	11	(England) Cyrille Regis	5
1986–87	1	Div 1	(England) Cyrille Regis	16	(England) Cyrille Regis	12	(England) Dave Bennett (England) Keith Houchen	5
1987–88	1	Div 1	(England) Cyrille Regis	12	(England) Cyrille Regis	10	(England) Micky Gynn (England) Cyrille Regis	2
1988–89	1	Div 1	(Scotland) David Speedie	15	(Scotland) David Speedie	14	(England) Micky Gynn	3
1989–90	1	Div 1	(Scotland) David Speedie	9	(Scotland) David Speedie	8	(England) Steve Livingstone	5
1990–91	1	Div 1	(Scotland) Kevin Gallacher	16	(Scotland) Kevin Gallacher	11	(Scotland) Kevin Gallacher (England) Steve Livingstone	5
1991–92	1	Div 1	(Scotland) Kevin Gallacher	10	(Scotland) Kevin Gallacher	8	(Scotland) Kevin Gallacher (England) Robert Rosario	2
1992–93	1	Prem	(England) Micky Quinn	17	(England) Micky Quinn	17	(England) Brian Borrows (Zimbabwe) Peter Ndlovu	1
1993–94	1	Prem	(Zimbabwe) Peter Ndlovu	11	(Zimbabwe) Peter Ndlovu	11	(England) Steve Morgan	3
1994–95	1	Prem	(England) Dion Dublin	16	(England) Dion Dublin	13	(England) Dion Dublin	3
1995–96	1	Prem	(England) Dion Dublin	16	(England) Dion Dublin	14	(England) Dion Dublin (Ghana) Nii Lamptey (England) John Salako	2
1996–97	1	Prem	(England) Dion Dublin	13	(England) Dion Dublin	13	(England) Darren Huckerby (Scotland) Eoin Jess (Scotland) Paul Telfer (England) Noel Whelan	2
1997–98	1	Prem	(England) Dion Dublin	23	(England) Dion Dublin	18	(England) Dion Dublin	5
1998–99	1	Prem	(England) Noel Whelan	13	(England) Noel Whelan	10	(England) Darren Huckerby (England) Noel Whelan	3
1999–2000	1	Prem	(Scotland) Gary McAllister	13	(Republic of Ireland) Robbie Keane	12	(Morocco) Youssef Chippo	4
2000–01	1	Prem	(Wales) Craig Bellamy	8	(Wales) Craig Bellamy (Morocco) Mustapha Hadji (Wales) John Hartson	6	(Australia) John Aloisi	3
2001–02	2	Div 1	(England) Lee Hughes	14	(England) Lee Hughes	14	(Republic of Ireland) Lee Carsley (England) David Thompson	1
2002–03	2	Div 1	(England) Jay Bothroyd	11	(England) Jay Bothroyd	8	(England) Gary McSheffrey (England) Lee Mills	4
2003–04	2	Div 1	(England) Gary McSheffrey	12	(England) Gary McSheffrey	11	(England) Julian Joachim	3
2004–05	2	Cham	(England) Gary McSheffrey	14	(England) Gary McSheffrey	12	(England) Gary McSheffrey (Cameroon) Patrick Suffo	2
2005–06	2	Cham	(England) Gary McSheffrey	17	(England) Gary McSheffrey	15	(England) Gary McSheffrey	2
2006–07	2	Cham	(Nigeria) Dele Adebola	9	(Nigeria) Dele Adebola	8	(Nigeria) Dele Adebola (Scotland) Colin Cameron (Trinidad and Tobago) Stern John (England) Leon McKenzie	1
2007–08	2	Cham	(Malta) Michael Mifsud	17	(Malta) Michael Mifsud	10	(Malta) Michael Mifsud	7
2008–09	2	Cham	(Republic of Ireland) Clinton Morrison	12	(Republic of Ireland) Clinton Morrison	10	(Republic of Ireland) Leon Best (Republic of Ireland) Clinton Morrison (England) Robbie Simpson	2
2009–10	2	Cham	(Republic of Ireland) Clinton Morrison	11	(Republic of Ireland) Clinton Morrison	11	(Republic of Ireland) David Bell (Republic of Ireland) Leon Best	1
2010–11	2	Cham	(Jamaica) Marlon King	13	(Jamaica) Marlon King	12	(England) Carl Baker (Wales) Freddy Eastwood (Jamaica) Marlon King (England) Richard Wood	1
2011–12	2	Cham	(England) Lukas Jutkiewicz (England) Gary McSheffrey	9	(England) Lukas Jutkiewicz	9	(England) Gary McSheffrey (Republic of Ireland) Roy O'Donovan	1
2012–13	3	FL1	(Republic of Ireland) David McGoldrick	18	(Republic of Ireland) David McGoldrick	16	(England) Carl Baker (England) Callum Ball	3
2013–14	3	FL1	(England) Callum Wilson	22	(England) Callum Wilson	21	(England) Carl Baker (England) Leon Clarke	3
2014–15	3	FL1	(England) Frank Nouble	7	(England) Frank Nouble (Scotland) Jim O'Brien (England) Dominic Samuel	6	(Northern Ireland) Josh McQuoid (England) Aaron Phillips	2
2015–16	3	FL1	(England) Adam Armstrong	20	(England) Adam Armstrong	20	(England) Jacob Murphy (England) Marcus Tudgay	1
2016–17	3	FL1	(Wales) George Thomas	9	(Wales) George Thomas	5	(England) Ryan Haynes (Portugal) Rúben Lameiras (Wales) George Thomas	4
2017–18	4	FL2	(Scotland) Marc McNulty	28	(Scotland) Marc McNulty	23	(Scotland) Marc McNulty	5
2018–19	3	FL1	(England) Jordy Hiwula	13	(England) Jordy Hiwula	12	(England) Jonson Clarke-Harris (England) Jordy Hiwula (England) Luke Thomas	1
2019–20^{[H]}	3	FL1	(England) Matt Godden	15	(England) Matt Godden	14	(France) Maxime Biamou	7
2020–21	2	Cham	(England) Tyler Walker	8	(England) Tyler Walker	7	(France) Maxime Biamou (England) Tyler Walker	1
2021–22	2	Cham	(Sweden) Viktor Gyökeres	18	(Sweden) Viktor Gyökeres	17	(Sweden) Viktor Gyökeres (Scotland) Dominic Hyam (England) Tyler Walker	1
2022–23	2	Cham	(Sweden) Viktor Gyökeres	22	(Sweden) Viktor Gyökeres	21	(Netherlands) Gustavo Hamer	2
2023–24	2	Cham	(England) Ellis Simms (United States) Haji Wright	19	(United States) Haji Wright	16	(England) Ellis Simms	6
2024–25	2	Cham	(United States) Haji Wright	12	(United States) Haji Wright	12	(Ghana) Brandon Thomas-Asante	2
2025–26	2	Cham	(United States) Haji Wright	18	(United States) Haji Wright	17	(England) Ellis Simms (United States) Haji Wright	1

=== Most assists ===
Season	League		Most assists					
Season	Level	Division	All Competitions	Assists	League Only	Assists	Cups Only^{[I]}	Assists
data before 2008–09 not readily available
2008–09	2	Cham	(Wales) Freddy Eastwood	8	(France) Guillaume Beuzelin (England) Danny Fox	5	(Wales) Freddy Eastwood	4
2009–10	2	Cham	(Scotland) Michael McIndoe	6	(Scotland) Michael McIndoe	6	(Republic of Ireland) Keiren Westwood	1
2010–11	2	Cham	(Iceland) Aron Gunnarsson	7	(Iceland) Aron Gunnarsson	7	(England) Gary McSheffrey	2
2011–12	2	Cham	(England) Gary McSheffrey	5	(England) Gary McSheffrey	5	(Republic of Ireland) David Bell (Republic of Ireland) Cyrus Christie	1
2012–13	3	FL1	(England) Gary McSheffrey	8	(England) Gary McSheffrey	7	(England) Carl Baker (Belgium) Franck Moussa	2
2013–14	3	FL1	(England) Carl Baker	10	(England) Carl Baker	9	(Scotland) John Fleck (Belgium) Franck Moussa	2
2014–15	3	FL1	(Scotland) Jim O'Brien	9	(Scotland) Jim O'Brien	8	(England) Ryan Haynes (Canada) Simeon Jackson (England) James Maddison (Scotland) Jim O'Brien (England) Danny Pugh	1
2015–16	3	FL1	(England) Jacob Murphy	9	(England) Jacob Murphy	9	(England) Conor Thomas (Wales) George Thomas	1
2016–17	3	FL1	(England) Jodi Jones	7	(Burundi) Gaël Bigirimana	4	(England) Jodi Jones	4
2017–18	4	FL2	(Scotland) Marc McNulty	10	(France) Maxime Biamou (Scotland) Marc McNulty	5	(Scotland) Marc McNulty	5
2018–19	3	FL1	(England) Luke Thomas	5	(England) Luke Thomas	5	(France) Tony Andreu	1
2019–20^{[H]}	3	FL1	(England) Callum O'Hare (Republic of Ireland) Jordan Shipley	7	(Republic of Ireland) Jordan Shipley (England) Liam Walsh	5	(England) Callum O'Hare (England) Zain Westbrooke	3
2020–21	2	Cham	(England) Callum O'Hare	8	(England) Callum O'Hare	8	(England) Brandon Mason	1
2021–22	2	Cham	(Netherlands) Gustavo Hamer	9	(Netherlands) Gustavo Hamer	9	(England) Jamie Allen (England) Todd Kane (England) Ben Sheaf	1
2022–23	2	Cham	(Sweden) Viktor Gyökeres	12	(Sweden) Viktor Gyökeres (Netherlands) Gustavo Hamer	10	(Sweden) Viktor Gyökeres	2
2023–24	2	Cham	(Jamaica) Kasey Palmer (United States) Haji Wright	7	(United States) Haji Wright	7	(Jamaica) Kasey Palmer (England) Ellis Simms	3
2024–25	2	Cham	(England) Jack Rudoni	13	(England) Jack Rudoni	12	(Jamaica) Kasey Palmer (Netherlands) Milan van Ewijk	2
2025–26	2	Cham	(Netherlands) Milan van Ewijk	8	(Netherlands) Milan van Ewijk	8	(United States) Haji Wright	1

=== Most appearances ===
Season	League		Most appearances					
Season	Level	Division	All Competitions	Apps	League Only	Apps	Cups Only^{[I]}	Apps
1958–59	4	Div 4	(England) Roy Kirk	48	(England) Roy Kirk	46	9 players	2
1959–60	3	Div 3	(South Africa) Arthur Lightening	48	(South Africa) Arthur Lightening	46	10 players	2
1960–61	3	Div 3	(England) George Curtis	51	(England) George Curtis	46	(England) George Curtis (England) Ron Farmer (England) Frank Kletzenbauer (South Africa) Arthur Lightening (England) Bill Myerscough	5
1961–62	3	Div 3	(England) George Curtis	49	(England) George Curtis	46	(England) Frank Austin (England) George Curtis (Wales) Ron Hewitt (England) Brian Hill (Scotland) Stewart Imlach (South Africa) Arthur Lightening (Wales) Brian Nicholas	3
1962–63	3	Div 3	(England) George Curtis	56	(England) George Curtis	45	(England) George Curtis (England) John Sillett (England) Jimmy Whitehouse	11
1963–64	3	Div 3	(England) George Curtis (Wales) Ronnie Rees	50	(England) George Curtis (Wales) Ronnie Rees	46	(England) George Curtis (England) Ken Hale (England) George Hudson (Northern Ireland) Billy Humphries (Wales) Ronnie Rees (England) John Sillett (England) Bob Wesson	4
1964–65	2	Div 2	(England) George Curtis (Wales) Ronnie Rees	46	(England) George Curtis (Wales) Ronnie Rees	41	(England) George Curtis (England) George Hudson (England) Mick Kearns (Wales) Ronnie Rees	5
1965–66	2	Div 2	(England) George Curtis	50	(England) George Curtis	42	(England) George Curtis (England) Ron Farmer (England) Allan Harris (England) Mick Kearns (England) Bob Wesson	8
1966–67	2	Div 2	(England) George Curtis	46	(England) George Curtis	42	(Northern Ireland) Dave Clements (England) George Curtis (England) Bill Glazier (England) Bobby Gould (England) Mick Kearns (Wales) Ronnie Rees	4
1967–68	1	Div 1	(England) Ernie Machin	44	(Northern Ireland) Dave Clements	41	(Germany) Dietmar Bruck (Scotland) Willie Carr (England) Ernie Machin	4
1968–69	1	Div 1	(England) Bill Glazier	49	(England) Bill Glazier	42	(England) Bill Glazier (England) Brian Hill (England) Ernie Hunt	7
1969–70	1	Div 1	(England) Mick Coop	44	(England) Mick Coop	41	(Scotland) Willie Carr (Northern Ireland) Dave Clements (England) Mick Coop (England) Bill Glazier (England) Ernie Hunt (England) Ernie Machin (Scotland) Neil Martin	3
1970–71	1	Div 1	(England) Jeff Blockley	52	(England) Jeff Blockley	42	(England) Jeff Blockley (Scotland) Willie Carr (Northern Ireland) Dave Clements	10
1971–72	1	Div 1	(Scotland) Willie Carr (England) Wilf Smith	45	(England) Jeff Blockley (Scotland) Willie Carr (England) Wilf Smith	42	(Scotland) Willie Carr (England) Bill Glazier (England) Ernie Hunt (England) Dennis Mortimer (England) Bobby Parker (England) Wilf Smith	3
1972–73	1	Div 1	(England) Mick Coop	48	(England) Mick Coop	42	(Scotland) Roy Barry (England) Mick Coop (England) Bill Glazier (England) Dennis Mortimer (England) Wilf Smith	6
1973–74	1	Div 1	(Republic of Ireland) Jimmy Holmes (Scotland) Tommy Hutchison	53	(Republic of Ireland) Jimmy Holmes (Scotland) Tommy Hutchison	41	(Scotland) Brian Alderson (England) Alan Dugdale (England) Bill Glazier (Republic of Ireland) Jimmy Holmes (Scotland) Tommy Hutchison	12
1974–75	1	Div 1	(Scotland) Tommy Hutchison	46	(Scotland) Tommy Hutchison	42	(Scotland) Brian Alderson (Scotland) Willie Carr (England) Chris Cattlin (England) John Craven (England) Alan Dugdale (Scotland) Tommy Hutchison (England) Larry Lloyd (England) Graham Oakey	4
1975–76	1	Div 1	(England) Mick Coop (Scotland) Tommy Hutchison	47	(England) Mick Coop (Scotland) Tommy Hutchison	42	(Scotland) Jim Brogan (England) Mick Coop (England) David Cross (England) Alan Dugdale (United States) Alan Green (Scotland) Tommy Hutchison	5
1976–77	1	Div 1	(England) John Beck	45	(England) John Beck (England) Barry Powell	40	(England) John Beck (Scotland) Jim Blyth (England) Mick Coop (England) Alan Dugdale (Scotland) Bobby McDonald	5
1977–78	1	Div 1	(Scotland) Bobby McDonald (England) Barry Powell	47	(Scotland) Bobby McDonald (England) Barry Powell	42	(England) Mick Coop (England) Mick Ferguson (Scotland) Tommy Hutchison (Scotland) Bobby McDonald (England) Barry Powell (Scotland) Ian Wallace	5
1978–79	1	Div 1	(Scotland) Tommy Hutchison (Scotland) Bobby McDonald	45	(Scotland) Tommy Hutchison (Scotland) Bobby McDonald	42	(Scotland) Jim Holton (Scotland) Tommy Hutchison (Scotland) Bobby McDonald (England) Barry Powell (England) Garry Thompson (Scotland) Ian Wallace	3
1979–80	1	Div 1	(Scotland) Tommy Hutchison	45	(Scotland) Tommy Hutchison	40	(England) Tommy English (Scotland) Gary Gillespie (Scotland) Tommy Hutchison (Scotland) Bobby McDonald	5
1980–81	1	Div 1	(England) Paul Dyson (England) Harry Roberts	54	(England) Paul Dyson (England) Harry Roberts	41	(Scotland) Andy Blair (England) Paul Dyson (England) Harry Roberts	13
1981–82	1	Div 1	(Scotland) Gary Gillespie	46	(England) Paul Dyson (Scotland) Gary Gillespie	40	(Scotland) Jim Blyth (Scotland) Gary Gillespie (England) Mark Hateley (England) Danny Thomas	6
1982–83	1	Div 1	(Scotland) Gary Gillespie	48	(Scotland) Gary Gillespie	42	(England) Paul Dyson (Scotland) Gary Gillespie (England) Stephen Hunt (England) Danny Thomas (England) Steve Whitton	6
1983–84	1	Div 1	(England) Terry Gibson (England) Nick Platnauer	41	(England) Terry Gibson	36	(England) Trevor Peake (England) Nick Platnauer (England) Harry Roberts	7
1984–85	1	Div 1	(England) Steve Ogrizovic	46	(England) Steve Ogrizovic	42	(England) Micky Adams (England) Terry Gibson (England) Micky Gynn (England) Brian Kilcline (England) Steve Ogrizovic	4
1985–86	1	Div 1	(England) Steve Ogrizovic	47	(England) Steve Ogrizovic	42	(England) Dave Bennett (England) Brian Borrows (Scotland) Dave Bowman (England) Brian Kilcline (England) Lloyd McGrath (England) Steve Ogrizovic (England) Trevor Peake	5
1986–87	1	Div 1	(England) Steve Ogrizovic	53	(England) Steve Ogrizovic	42	(England) Greg Downs (England) Steve Ogrizovic (Wales) David Phillips (England) Nick Pickering (England) Cyrille Regis	11
1987–88	1	Div 1	(England) Steve Ogrizovic	46	(England) Steve Ogrizovic	40	(England) Dave Bennett (England) Brian Borrows (England) Greg Downs (England) Micky Gynn (England) Lloyd McGrath (England) Steve Ogrizovic	6
1988–89	1	Div 1	(England) Brian Borrows (England) Steve Ogrizovic	42	(England) Brian Borrows (England) Steve Ogrizovic	38	(England) Brian Borrows (England) Brian Kilcline (England) Steve Ogrizovic (England) Cyrille Regis (England) Steve Sedgley (England) David Smith (Scotland) David Speedie	4
1989–90	1	Div 1	(England) Brian Borrows (England) David Smith	46	(England) Brian Borrows (England) Steve Ogrizovic (England) David Smith	37	(England) Brian Borrows (England) Trevor Peake (England) David Smith	9
1990–91	1	Div 1	(England) Brian Borrows	47	(England) Brian Borrows	38	(England) Brian Borrows (England) Micky Gynn (England) Steve Ogrizovic (England) Cyrille Regis	9
1991–92	1	Div 1	(England) Lloyd McGrath	46	(England) Lloyd McGrath	40	(England) Peter Billing (England) Paul Furlong (England) Lloyd McGrath (England) Andy Pearce	6
1992–93	1	Prem	(England) John Williams	44	(England) John Williams	41	(England) Peter Atherton (Republic of Ireland) Phil Babb (England) Brian Borrows (Scotland) Kevin Gallacher (England) Lloyd McGrath (England) Steve Ogrizovic (England) Andy Pearce (England) John Williams	3
1993–94	1	Prem	(Republic of Ireland) Phil Babb (England) Steve Morgan	44	(England) Peter Atherton (Republic of Ireland) Phil Babb (England) Steve Morgan (Zimbabwe) Peter Ndlovu	40	(Republic of Ireland) Phil Babb (England) Steve Morgan (England) Steve Ogrizovic (Scotland) David Rennie (United States) Roy Wegerle	4
1994–95	1	Prem	(England) Brian Borrows (England) Paul Cook (England) Steve Ogrizovic	40	(England) Brian Borrows	35	(England) Dion Dublin (England) Steve Ogrizovic	7
1995–96	1	Prem	(England) John Salako	43	(England) John Salako	37	(England) Kevin Richardson (Scotland) Paul Telfer	7
1996–97	1	Prem	(Scotland) Gary McAllister (England) Steve Ogrizovic	46	(Scotland) Gary McAllister (England) Steve Ogrizovic	38	(Scotland) Gary McAllister (England) Steve Ogrizovic (England) Kevin Richardson (Scotland) Paul Telfer (England) Noel Whelan	8
1997–98	1	Prem	(England) Dion Dublin	43	(England) Dion Dublin	36	(Republic of Ireland) Gary Breen (England) David Burrows	9
1998–99	1	Prem	(Sweden) Magnus Hedman (England) Richard Shaw	42	(Sweden) Magnus Hedman (England) Richard Shaw	36	(Netherlands) George Boateng (Sweden) Magnus Hedman (England) Richard Shaw (Norway) Trond Egil Soltvedt	6
1999–2000	1	Prem	(Scotland) Gary McAllister	43	(Scotland) Gary McAllister	38	(England) John Eustace (Scotland) Gary McAllister	5
2000–01	1	Prem	(Wales) Craig Bellamy	39	(Wales) Craig Bellamy	34	(Republic of Ireland) Gary Breen (England) Paul Williams	6
2001–02	2	Div 1	(Bosnia and Herzegovina) Muhamed Konjić	41	(England) Lee Hughes (Bosnia and Herzegovina) Muhamed Konjić	38	(England) Jay Bothroyd (Republic of Ireland) Gary Breen (Republic of Ireland) Lee Carsley (Bosnia and Herzegovina) Muhamed Konjić (England) Richard Shaw (England) David Thompson	3
2002–03	2	Div 1	(Bosnia and Herzegovina) Muhamed Konjić	48	(Bosnia and Herzegovina) Muhamed Konjić	42	(England) Jay Bothroyd (Bosnia and Herzegovina) Muhamed Konjić	6
2003–04	2	Div 1	(England) Stephen Warnock	49	(England) Stephen Warnock	44	(Nigeria) Dele Adebola (Republic of Ireland) Michael Doyle (Bosnia and Herzegovina) Muhamed Konjić (England) Stephen Warnock	5
2004–05	2	Cham	(Republic of Ireland) Michael Doyle	49	(Republic of Ireland) Michael Doyle	44	(Republic of Ireland) Michael Doyle	5
2005–06	2	Cham	(England) Gary McSheffrey	50	(England) Gary McSheffrey	45	(Republic of Ireland) Michael Doyle (England) Gary McSheffrey	5
2006–07	2	Cham	(Nigeria) Dele Adebola (Republic of Ireland) Michael Doyle (England) Marcus Hall (England) Andy Marshall	42	(England) Andy Marshall	41	(England) Andy Whing	3
2007–08	2	Cham	(Republic of Ireland) Michael Doyle (England) Isaac Osbourne (Republic of Ireland) Jay Tabb	49	(Republic of Ireland) Michael Doyle (England) Isaac Osbourne (Republic of Ireland) Jay Tabb	42	(Republic of Ireland) Michael Doyle (England) Isaac Osbourne (Republic of Ireland) Jay Tabb	7
2008–09	2	Cham	(Republic of Ireland) Keiren Westwood	49	(Republic of Ireland) Keiren Westwood	46	(Iceland) Aron Gunnarsson	7
2009–10	2	Cham	(Republic of Ireland) Keiren Westwood	46	(Republic of Ireland) Keiren Westwood	44	(Scotland) Michael McIndoe (England) Stephen Wright	3
2010–11	2	Cham	(Republic of Ireland) Richard Keogh	48	(Republic of Ireland) Richard Keogh	46	(England) Carl Baker (England) Clive Platt (England) Richard Wood	3
2011–12	2	Cham	(Republic of Ireland) Richard Keogh (Republic of Ireland) Joe Murphy	47	(Republic of Ireland) Joe Murphy	46	9 players	2
2012–13	3	FL1	(Republic of Ireland) Joe Murphy	56	(Republic of Ireland) Joe Murphy	45	(England) Carl Baker	12
2013–14	3	FL1	(Republic of Ireland) Joe Murphy	53	(Republic of Ireland) Joe Murphy	46	(England) Blair Adams (Belgium) Franck Moussa (Republic of Ireland) Joe Murphy	7
2014–15	3	FL1	(Scotland) John Fleck (Scotland) Jim O'Brien	47	(Scotland) John Fleck (Scotland) Jim O'Brien	43	(England) James Maddison (England) Jordan Willis	6
2015–16	3	FL1	(Wales) Sam Ricketts (France) Romain Vincelot	46	(France) Romain Vincelot	45	(Scotland) John Fleck (Portugal) Rúben Lameiras (England) Aaron Martin (Scotland) Jim O'Brien (England) Aaron Phillips (Wales) Sam Ricketts	3
2016–17	3	FL1	(England) Jordan Turnbull (England) Jordan Willis	46	(England) Jordan Turnbull (England) Jordan Willis	36	(England) Jodi Jones	11
2017–18	4	FL2	(Scotland) Jack Grimmer	53	(Republic of Ireland) Michael Doyle	44	(Scotland) Jack Grimmer (Republic of Ireland) Jordan Shipley	11
2018–19	3	FL1	(England) Luke Thomas	44	(England) Luke Thomas	43	(Sierra Leone) Amadou Bakayoko (England) Jordy Hiwula (England) Liam O'Brien (England) Abu Ogogo (England) Jordon Thompson	4
2019–20^{[H]}	3	FL1	(Republic of Ireland) Jordan Shipley	42	(Slovakia) Marko Maroši	34	(England) Callum O'Hare (Republic of Ireland) Jordan Shipley	11
2020–21	2	Cham	(England) Callum O'Hare	48	(England) Callum O'Hare	46	(Sierra Leone) Amadou Bakayoko	3
2021–22	2	Cham	(Sweden) Viktor Gyökeres (England) Callum O'Hare	47	(Sweden) Viktor Gyökeres (England) Callum O'Hare	45	(England) Jamie Allen (England) Jodi Jones (Scotland) Michael Rose (Republic of Ireland) Jordan Shipley	3
2022–23	2	Cham	(England) Jake Bidwell (Sweden) Viktor Gyökeres	50	(Sweden) Viktor Gyökeres	46	(England) Jamie Allen (England) Jake Bidwell (England) Callum Doyle	5
2023–24	2	Cham	(England) Ellis Simms	53	(England) Ellis Simms	46	(England) Josh Eccles (Jamaica) Joel Latibeaudiere (England) Ellis Simms (Netherlands) Milan van Ewijk	7
2024–25	2	Cham	(Netherlands) Milan van Ewijk	51	(Netherlands) Milan van Ewijk	45	(England) Jamie Allen (England) Jack Rudoni (England) Bobby Thomas (Ghana) Brandon Thomas-Asante	7
2025–26	2	Cham	(England) Matt Grimes	48	(England) Matt Grimes (England) Carl Rushworth	46	(Wales) Kai Andrews (England) Jake Bidwell (England) Liam Kitching (England) Jack Rudoni (England) Ellis Simms (England) Ben Wilson (United States) Haji Wright	3

=== Most clean sheets ===
Season	League		Most clean sheets					
Season	Level	Division	All Competitions	Clean sheets	League Only	Clean sheets	Cups Only^{[I]}	Clean sheets
1958–59	4	Div 4	(South Africa) Arthur Lightening	9	(South Africa) Arthur Lightening	9	none	none
1959–60	3	Div 3	(South Africa) Arthur Lightening	10	(South Africa) Arthur Lightening	10	none	none
1960–61	3	Div 3	(South Africa) Arthur Lightening	7	(South Africa) Arthur Lightening	7	none	none
1961–62	3	Div 3	(South Africa) Arthur Lightening	11	(South Africa) Arthur Lightening	10	(South Africa) Arthur Lightening	1
1962–63	3	Div 3	(England) Bob Wesson	11	(England) Bob Wesson	9	(England) Bob Wesson	2
1963–64	3	Div 3	(England) Bob Wesson	12	(England) Bob Wesson	12	none	none
1964–65	2	Div 2	(England) Bill Glazier	7	(England) Bill Glazier	7	none	none
1965–66	2	Div 2	(England) Bob Wesson	7	(England) Bob Wesson	6	(England) Bob Wesson	1
1966–67	2	Div 2	(England) Bill Glazier	13	(England) Bill Glazier	13	none	none
1967–68	1	Div 1	(England) Bill Glazier	8	(England) Bill Glazier	7	(England) Bill Glazier	1
1968–69	1	Div 1	(England) Bill Glazier	10	(England) Bill Glazier	8	(England) Bill Glazier	2
1969–70	1	Div 1	(England) Bill Glazier	15	(England) Bill Glazier	15	none	none
1970–71	1	Div 1	(England) Bill Glazier	18	(England) Bill Glazier	16	(England) Bill Glazier	2
1971–72	1	Div 1	(England) Bill Glazier	4	(England) Bill Glazier	4	none	none
1972–73	1	Div 1	(England) Bill Glazier	10	(England) Bill Glazier	7	(England) Bill Glazier	3
1973–74	1	Div 1	(England) Bill Glazier	15	(England) Bill Glazier	11	(England) Bill Glazier	4
1974–75	1	Div 1	(England) Neil Ramsbottom	7	(England) Neil Ramsbottom	6	(England) Neil Ramsbottom	1
1975–76	1	Div 1	(England) Bryan King	7	(England) Bryan King	7	none	none
1976–77	1	Div 1	(Scotland) Jim Blyth	8	(Scotland) Jim Blyth	5	(Scotland) Jim Blyth	3
1977–78	1	Div 1	(Scotland) Jim Blyth	9	(Scotland) Jim Blyth	8	(Scotland) Jim Blyth	1
1978–79	1	Div 1	(England) Les Sealey	9	(England) Les Sealey	9	none	none
1979–80	1	Div 1	(England) Les Sealey	6	(Scotland) Jim Blyth (England) Les Sealey	4	(England) Les Sealey	2
1980–81	1	Div 1	(England) Les Sealey	9	(England) Les Sealey	6	(England) Les Sealey	3
1981–82	1	Div 1	(England) Les Sealey	8	(England) Les Sealey	8	(Scotland) Jim Blyth	1
1982–83	1	Div 1	(England) Les Sealey	14	(England) Les Sealey	13	(England) Les Sealey	1
1983–84	1	Div 1	(Socialist Federal Republic of Yugoslavia) Radojko Avramović	6	(Socialist Federal Republic of Yugoslavia) Radojko Avramović	4	(Socialist Federal Republic of Yugoslavia) Radojko Avramović	2
1984–85	1	Div 1	(England) Steve Ogrizovic	14	(England) Steve Ogrizovic	14	none	none
1985–86	1	Div 1	(England) Steve Ogrizovic	11	(England) Steve Ogrizovic	10	(England) Steve Ogrizovic	1
1986–87	1	Div 1	(England) Steve Ogrizovic	18	(England) Steve Ogrizovic	13	(England) Steve Ogrizovic	5
1987–88	1	Div 1	(England) Steve Ogrizovic	17	(England) Steve Ogrizovic	15	(England) Steve Ogrizovic	2
1988–89	1	Div 1	(England) Steve Ogrizovic	13	(England) Steve Ogrizovic	12	(England) Steve Ogrizovic	1
1989–90	1	Div 1	(England) Steve Ogrizovic	17	(England) Steve Ogrizovic	12	(England) Steve Ogrizovic	5
1990–91	1	Div 1	(England) Steve Ogrizovic	11	(England) Steve Ogrizovic	9	(England) Steve Ogrizovic	2
1991–92	1	Div 1	(England) Steve Ogrizovic	16	(England) Steve Ogrizovic	14	(England) Steve Ogrizovic	2
1992–93	1	Prem	(England) Steve Ogrizovic	9	(England) Steve Ogrizovic	8	(England) Steve Ogrizovic	1
1993–94	1	Prem	(England) Steve Ogrizovic	13	(England) Steve Ogrizovic	12	(England) Steve Ogrizovic	1
1994–95	1	Prem	(England) Steve Ogrizovic	12	(England) Steve Ogrizovic	11	(England) Steve Ogrizovic	1
1995–96	1	Prem	(England) Steve Ogrizovic	8	(England) Steve Ogrizovic	8	(Australia) John Filan (Scotland) Jonathan Gould	1
1996–97	1	Prem	(England) Steve Ogrizovic	10	(England) Steve Ogrizovic	9	(England) Steve Ogrizovic	1
1997–98	1	Prem	(Sweden) Magnus Hedman	8	(England) Steve Ogrizovic	7	(Sweden) Magnus Hedman	2
1998–99	1	Prem	(Sweden) Magnus Hedman	11	(Sweden) Magnus Hedman	7	(Sweden) Magnus Hedman	4
1999–2000	1	Prem	(Sweden) Magnus Hedman	10	(Sweden) Magnus Hedman	9	(Sweden) Magnus Hedman	1
2000–01	1	Prem	(England) Chris Kirkland	6	(England) Chris Kirkland	4	(England) Chris Kirkland	2
2001–02	2	Div 1	(Sweden) Magnus Hedman	10	(Sweden) Magnus Hedman	10	none	none
2002–03	2	Div 1	(France) Fabien Debec	6	(France) Fabien Debec	4	(France) Fabien Debec	2
2003–04	2	Div 1	(Scotland) Scott Shearer	10	(Scotland) Scott Shearer	9	(Scotland) Scott Shearer	1
2004–05	2	Cham	(England) Luke Steele	6	(England) Luke Steele	4	(England) Luke Steele	2
2005–06	2	Cham	(Hungary) Márton Fülöp	9	(Hungary) Márton Fülöp	9	(Trinidad and Tobago) Clayton Ince	2
2006–07	2	Cham	(England) Andy Marshall	10	(England) Andy Marshall	10	none	none
2007–08	2	Cham	(England) Andy Marshall	8	(England) Andy Marshall	5	(England) Andy Marshall	3
2008–09	2	Cham	(Republic of Ireland) Keiren Westwood	13	(Republic of Ireland) Keiren Westwood	11	(Republic of Ireland) Keiren Westwood	2
2009–10	2	Cham	(Republic of Ireland) Keiren Westwood	9	(Republic of Ireland) Keiren Westwood	9	none	none
2010–11	2	Cham	(Republic of Ireland) Keiren Westwood	12	(Republic of Ireland) Keiren Westwood	12	none	none
2011–12	2	Cham	(Republic of Ireland) Joe Murphy	9	(Republic of Ireland) Joe Murphy	9	none	none
2012–13	3	FL1	(Republic of Ireland) Joe Murphy	14	(Republic of Ireland) Joe Murphy	9	(Republic of Ireland) Joe Murphy	5
2013–14	3	FL1	(Republic of Ireland) Joe Murphy	10	(Republic of Ireland) Joe Murphy	9	(Republic of Ireland) Joe Murphy	1
2014–15	3	FL1	(England) Ryan Allsop	9	(England) Ryan Allsop	8	(England) Ryan Allsop (England) Lee Burge	1
2015–16	3	FL1	(England) Reice Charles-Cook	14	(England) Reice Charles-Cook	13	(England) Reice Charles-Cook	1
2016–17	3	FL1	(England) Lee Burge (England) Reice Charles-Cook	6	(England) Lee Burge	6	(England) Reice Charles-Cook	2
2017–18	4	FL2	(England) Lee Burge	17	(England) Lee Burge	14	(England) Lee Burge	3
2018–19	3	FL1	(England) Lee Burge	7	(England) Lee Burge	7	none	none
2019–20^{[H]}	3	FL1	(Slovakia) Marko Maroši	16	(Slovakia) Marko Maroši	14	(England) Ben Wilson	3
2020–21	2	Cham	(England) Ben Wilson	10	(England) Ben Wilson	10	(Slovakia) Marko Maroši	1
2021–22	2	Cham	(England) Simon Moore	9	(England) Simon Moore	9	(England) Ben Wilson	1
2022–23	2	Cham	(England) Ben Wilson	22	(England) Ben Wilson	20	(England) Ben Wilson	2
2023–24	2	Cham	(England) Bradley Collins	8	(England) Bradley Collins	8	(England) Ben Wilson	1
2024–25	2	Cham	(Sweden) Oliver Dovin	8	(Sweden) Oliver Dovin	8	(England) Ben Wilson	2
2025–26	2	Cham	(England) Carl Rushworth	17	(England) Carl Rushworth	17	(England) Ben Wilson	1

== Footnotes ==
A. The League Cup competition did not start until the 1960–61 season.
B. No competitive football was played between 1915 and 1919 due to the First World War.
C. No competitive football was played between 1939 and 1945 due to the Second World War.
D. The FA Cup was contested in 1945–46 but the Football League did not resume until the following season.
E. The club's highest ever league finish.
F. Deducted 10 points by the Football League.
G. The club's lowest ever league finish.
H. The season was postponed on 13 March 2020 after 34 league games, and later concluded prematurely due to the COVID-19 pandemic, with league positions and promotions decided on a points-per-game basis.
I. Includes all competitive cup competitions, including the English Football League play-offs (2017–18, 2022–23, 2024–25), but excluding the Birmingham Senior Cup, the Full Members' Cup and the Texaco Cup.

== See also ==
- List of Coventry City F.C. records and statistics
- Coventry City F.C. Player of the Year
- Coventry City F.C. in European football
