= 1993–94 Coventry City F.C. season =

Coventry City F.C.
1993–94 season
- Manager: Bobby Gould (until 23 October); Phil Neal (from 23 October)
- Stadium: Highfield Road
- FA Premier League: 11th
- FA Cup: Third round
- League Cup: Third round
- Top goalscorer: Peter Ndlovu (11)
- Average home league attendance: 13,452
Home colours

During the 1993–94 English football season, Coventry City F.C. competed in the FA Premier League.

== Season summary ==
Coventry City's 27th successive season in the top flight began with a superb 3–0 win at Arsenal in which striker Micky Quinn scored a hat-trick. Coventry's surprisingly good form continued through the opening months of the season, so it was a surprise to all when manager Bobby Gould handed in his notice on 23 October 1993. Phil Neal, formerly of Bolton Wanderers, was announced as Gould's successor; despite having no experienced outside the league's third tier, he was able to defy the odds and keep Coventry well clear of the relegation which they had been tipped for in the last four seasons.

== Kit ==
Coventry City's kit was manufactured by Ribero and sponsored by French car maker Peugeot.

== Final league table ==
Pos	Team	Pld	W	D	L	GF	GA	GD	Pts	Qualification or relegation
9	Queens Park Rangers	42	16	12	14	62	61	+1	60	
10	Aston Villa	42	15	12	15	46	50	−4	57	Qualification for the UEFA Cup first round (Note: Aston Villa qualified for the UEFA Cup as League Cup winners.)
11	Coventry City	42	14	14	14	43	45	−2	56	
12	Norwich City	42	12	17	13	65	61	+4	53	
13	West Ham United	42	13	13	16	47	58	−11	52	

Source: Premier League
Rules for classification: 1) points; 2) goal difference; 3) number of goals scored.

== Results ==
Coventry City's score comes first

=== Legend ===
Win	Draw	Loss

=== FA Premier League ===
Date	Opponent	Venue	Result	Attendance	Scorers
14 August 1993	Arsenal	A	3–0	24,897	Quinn (3, 1 pen)
18 August 1993	Newcastle United	H	2–1	15,760	Ndlovu, Harford
21 August 1993	West Ham United	H	1–1	12,909	Wegerle
24 August 1993	Oldham Athletic	A	3–3	10,817	J. Williams, Ndlovu, Wegerle
27 August 1993	Manchester City	A	1–1	21,537	Wegerle
1 September 1993	Liverpool	H	1–0	16,740	Babb
11 September 1993	Aston Villa	A	0–0	31,181	
18 September 1993	Chelsea	H	1–1	13,660	Morgan
25 September 1993	Leeds United	H	0–2	13,934	
2 October 1993	Norwich City	A	0–1	16,239	
16 October 1993	Southampton	H	1–1	9,984	Babb
23 October 1993	Queens Park Rangers	A	1–5	12,976	Ndlovu
31 October 1993	Sheffield United	H	0–0	10,429	
6 November 1993	Everton	H	2–1	15,662	Quinn (2)
20 November 1993	Sheffield Wednesday	A	0–0	23,379	
23 November 1993	Blackburn Rovers	A	1–2	15,136	Ndlovu
27 November 1993	Manchester United	H	0–1	17,020	
4 December 1993	Arsenal	H	1–0	12,722	Quinn
11 December 1993	West Ham United	A	2–3	17,243	Darby (2)
18 December 1993	Oldham Athletic	H	1–1	11,800	Wegerle
26 December 1993	Wimbledon	A	2–1	4,739	Ndlovu, J. Williams
1 January 1994	Tottenham Hotspur	A	2–1	26,015	Babb, Wegerle
3 January 1994	Swindon Town	H	1–1	15,825	Wegerle
15 January 1994	Southampton	A	0–1	12,397	
22 January 1994	Queens Park Rangers	H	0–1	12,107	
2 February 1994	Ipswich Town	H	1–0	11,265	Flynn
5 February 1994	Swindon Town	A	1–3	14,640	Darby
12 February 1994	Sheffield United	A	0–0	15,394	
19 February 1994	Manchester City	H	4–0	11,735	Rennie, Quinn, Ndlovu, J. Williams
23 February 1994	Newcastle United	A	0–4	32,216	
26 February 1994	Liverpool	A	0–1	38,547	
6 March 1994	Aston Villa	H	0–1	14,325	
19 March 1994	Leeds United	A	0–1	30,023	
26 March 1994	Norwich City	H	2–1	13,514	Flynn, Quinn
2 April 1994	Wimbledon	H	1–2	11,290	Ndlovu
4 April 1994	Ipswich Town	A	2–0	12,633	Flynn, Ndlovu
9 April 1994	Tottenham Hotspur	H	1–0	14,491	Ndlovu (pen)
16 April 1994	Sheffield Wednesday	H	1–1	13,013	Ndlovu
23 April 1994	Everton	A	0–0	23,217	
2 May 1994	Blackburn Rovers	H	2–1	16,653	Darby (2)
4 May 1994	Chelsea	A	2–1	8,923	Morgan, Ndlovu
7 May 1994	Manchester United	A	0–0	44,717	

=== FA Cup ===
Round	Date	Opponent	Venue	Result	Attendance	Goalscorers
R3	8 January 1994	Newcastle United	A	0–2	35,444	

=== League Cup ===
Round	Date	Opponent	Venue	Result	Attendance	Goalscorers
R2 1st leg	22 September 1993	Wycombe Wanderers	H	3–0	9,615	Morgan (2), Quinn
R2 2nd leg	5 October 1993	Wycombe Wanderers	A	2–4 (won 5–4 on agg)	5,933	Babb, Morgan
R3	26 October 1993	Oldham Athletic	A	0–2	10,071	

== Squad ==
Note: Flags indicate national team as defined under FIFA eligibility rules; some limited exceptions apply. Players may hold more than one non-FIFA nationality.

No.	Pos.	Nation	Player
1	GK	ENG	Steve Ogrizovic
2	DF	ENG	Brian Borrows (captain)
3	DF	ENG	Steve Morgan
4	DF	ENG	Peter Atherton
5	DF	ENG	Lee Hirst
6	DF	SCO	David Rennie
7	FW	ENG	John Williams
8	MF	ENG	Lee Hurst
9	FW	ENG	Mick Harford
10	FW	ENG	Micky Quinn
11	MF	ENG	Stewart Robson
12	FW	ZIM	Peter Ndlovu
13	GK	WAL	Martin Davies
14	DF	ENG	David Busst
15	DF	ENG	Paul Williams
16	MF	IRL	Willie Boland

No.	Pos.	Nation	Player
17	FW	USA	Roy Wegerle
18	MF	ENG	Sean Flynn
19	MF	IRL	Tony Sheridan
20	DF	IRL	Phil Babb
21	MF	ENG	Chris Marsden (on loan from Huddersfield Town)
22	MF	ENG	Leigh Jenkinson
23	GK	SCO	Jonathan Gould
24	DF	ENG	Ally Pickering
25	MF	ENG	Julian Darby
26	MF	SCO	Sandy Robertson
28	MF	POL	Detsi Kruszynski
29	MF	ENG	John Gayle
31	GK	IRL	Tim Dalton
32	MF	ENG	Lloyd McGrath
33	MF	ENG	Paul Bailey

=== Left club during season ===
Note: Flags indicate national team as defined under FIFA eligibility rules; some limited exceptions apply. Players may hold more than one non-FIFA nationality.

No.	Pos.	Nation	Player
5	DF	ENG	Lee Hirst (on loan to Lincoln City)
21	DF	ENG	Martyn Booty (to Crewe Alexandra)

== Transfers ==
=== In ===
- Lee Hirst - Scarborough

=== Out ===
- Peter Billing - Port Vale, £35,000, May 1993
- Andy Pearce - Sheffield Wednesday
- Keith Rowland - West Ham United, £110,000
- Terry Fleming - Northampton Town
- Micky Gynn - Stoke City
- Craig Middleton - Cambridge United
- David Smith - Birmingham City

== Award ==
- Coventry City Player of the Year: Phil Babb
