= 1991–92 Coventry City F.C. season =

Coventry City
1991–92 season
- Chairman: Peter Robins
- Manager: Terry Butcher (until 6 January); Don Howe (from 7 January)
- Stadium: Highfield Road
- First Division: 19th
- FA Cup: Third round
- League Cup: Fourth round
- Full Members Cup: Second round
- Top goalscorer: League: Gallacher (8); All: Gallacher (10)
- Average home league attendance: 13,876

During the 1991–92 English football season, Coventry City F.C. competed in the Football League First Division.

== Season summary ==
In the 1991–92 season, Coventry had a poor start to the season and Butcher was sacked in January 1992 after just one year in charge. Don Howe took over as interim manager until the end of the season and managed to keep Coventry narrowly away from relegation and the club took its place in the inaugural FA Premier League.

== Final league table ==
Pos	Team	Pld	W	D	L	GF	GA	GD	Pts	Qualification or relegation
17	Oldham Athletic	42	14	9	19	63	67	−4	51	Qualification for the FA Premier League
18	Norwich City	42	11	12	19	47	63	−16	45	Qualification for the FA Premier League
19	Coventry City	42	11	11	20	35	44	−9	44	Qualification for the FA Premier League
20	Luton Town (R)	42	10	12	20	38	71	−33	42	Relegation to the First Division (Note: From the 1992–93 season, the first tier became the Premier League, and the second tier, then known as the Second Division, was renamed to the First Division.)
21	Notts County (R)	42	10	10	22	40	62	−22	40	Relegation to the First Division

Source: World Football
Rules for classification: 1) Points; 2) Goal difference; 3) Goals scored
(R) Relegated

== Results ==
Coventry City's score comes first

=== Legend ===
Win	Draw	Loss

=== Football League First Division ===
Date	Opponent	Venue	Result	Attendance	Scorers
17 August 1991	Manchester City	H	0–1	18,013	
21 August 1991	Luton Town	H	5–0	9,848	Gallacher (2), Rosario, Furlong, Smith
24 August 1991	Queens Park Rangers	A	1–1	9,393	Gynn
28 August 1991	Sheffield United	H	3–1	12,594	Rosario, Furlong, Smith
31 August 1991	Wimbledon	H	0–1	9,469	
3 September 1991	Oldham Athletic	A	1–2	12,996	Furlong
7 September 1991	Arsenal	A	2–1	28,142	Dixon (own goal), Ndlovu
14 September 1991	Notts County	H	1–0	10,685	Furlong
18 September 1991	Leeds United	H	0–0	15,488	
21 September 1991	Everton	A	0–3	20,542	
28 September 1991	Aston Villa	H	1–0	17,851	Ndlovu
5 October 1991	West Ham United	A	1–0	21,817	Gallacher
19 October 1991	Crystal Palace	H	1–2	10,591	Gynn (pen)
26 October 1991	Liverpool	A	0–1	33,339	
2 November 1991	Chelsea	H	0–1	11,343	
16 November 1991	Nottingham Forest	A	0–1	21,154	
23 November 1991	Norwich City	A	2–3	12,056	Gallacher (2)
30 November 1991	Southampton	H	2–0	8,585	Gallacher, Pearce
7 December 1991	Manchester United	A	0–4	42,549	
20 December 1991	Luton Town	A	0–1	7,533	
26 December 1991	Sheffield United	A	3–0	19,638	Billing, Flynn, Robson
28 December 1991	Wimbledon	A	1–1	3,270	Robson
1 January 1992	Tottenham Hotspur	H	1–2	19,639	Rosario
11 January 1992	Queens Park Rangers	H	2–2	12,003	Gallacher, Rosario
18 January 1992	Manchester City	A	0–1	23,005	
1 February 1992	Crystal Palace	H	1–0	13,818	Smith
8 February 1992	Liverpool	H	0–0	21,540	
22 February 1992	Southampton	A	0–0	13,719	
29 February 1992	Manchester United	H	0–0	23,967	
4 March 1992	Norwich City	H	0–0	8,549	
7 March 1992	Sheffield Wednesday	A	1–1	23,959	Gallacher
11 March 1992	Nottingham Forest	H	0–2	11,158	
14 March 1992	Chelsea	A	1–0	10,962	Robson
21 March 1992	Oldham Athletic	H	1–1	12,840	Pearce
28 March 1992	Tottenham Hotspur	A	3–4	22,744	McGrath, Flynn, Smith
4 April 1992	Arsenal	H	0–1	14,133	
8 April 1992	Sheffield Wednesday	H	0–0	13,293	
11 April 1992	Notts County	A	0–1	6,655	
18 April 1992	Everton	H	0–1	14,669	
20 April 1992	Leeds United	A	0–2	26,582	
25 April 1992	West Ham United	H	1–0	15,392	Gynn
2 May 1992	Aston Villa	A	0–2	31,984	

=== FA Cup ===
Round	Date	Opponent	Venue	Result	Attendance	Goalscorers
R3	4 January 1992	Cambridge United	H	1–1	11,428	Borrows (pen)
R3R	14 January 1992	Cambridge United	A	0–1	9,864	

=== League Cup ===
Round	Date	Opponent	Venue	Result	Attendance	Goalscorers
R2 1st leg	25 September 1991	Rochdale	H	4–0	5,982	Rosario (2), Gallacher, McGrath
R2 2nd leg	8 October 1991	Rochdale	A	0–1 (won 4–1 on agg)	22,888	
R3	30 October 1991	Arsenal	H	1–0	15,337	Gallacher
R4	4 December 1991	Tottenham Hotspur	H	1–2	20,095	Furlong

=== Full Members Cup ===
Round	Date	Opponent	Venue	Result	Attendance	Goalscorers
NR2	23 October 1991	Aston Villa	H	0–2	6,447	

== Squad ==
Note: Flags indicate national team as defined under FIFA eligibility rules; some limited exceptions apply. Players may hold more than one non-FIFA nationality.

Pos.	Nation	Player
GK	ENG	Steve Ogrizovic
DF	ENG	Brian Borrows
DF	ENG	Andy Pearce
DF	ENG	Peter Atherton
DF	ENG	Kenny Sansom
MF	ENG	Lloyd McGrath
MF	ENG	Stewart Robson
MF	ENG	David Smith
FW	SCO	Kevin Gallacher
FW	ENG	Paul Furlong
DF	ENG	Peter Billing
MF	ENG	Micky Gynn
FW	ENG	Robert Rosario
GK	ENG	Paul Heald
MF	ENG	Sean Flynn
MF	ENG	Dean Emerson

Pos.	Nation	Player
FW	ZIM	Peter Ndlovu
MF	ENG	Lee Hurst
MF	ENG	Ray Woods
DF	ENG	Paul Edwards
GK	ENG	Les Sealey
DF	ENG	Martyn Booty
DF	ENG	Chris Greenman
MF	ENG	Craig Middleton
FW	ENG	Kevin Drinkell
DF	ENG	Trevor Peake
GK	ENG	Clive Baker
DF	SCO	Gary Gillespie
MF	IRL	Tony Sheridan
MF	ENG	Terry Fleming
DF	ENG	David Busst

== Transfers ==
=== In ===
Date	Pos	Name	From	Fee
31 July 1991	FW	Paul Furlong	Enfield	£130,000
16 August 1991	FW	Peter Ndlovu	Highlanders	£10,000
23 August 1991	DF	Peter Atherton	Wigan Athletic	£300,000
3 December 1991	MF	Sean Flynn	Halesowen Town	£20,000
14 January 1992	DF	David Busst	Moor Green	Free transfer

=== Out ===
Date	Pos	Name	To	Fee
2 July 1991	FW	Cyrille Regis	Aston Villa	Free transfer
22 July 1991	GK	Tim Clarke	Huddersfield Town	£15,000
1 August 1991	DF	Brian Kilcline	Oldham Athletic	£400,000
27 August 1991	DF	Trevor Peake	Luton Town	£100,000
16 December 1991	MF	Howard Clark	Shrewsbury Town	Free transfer

Transfers in: ▼£460,000
Transfers out: ▲£515,000
Total spending: ▲£55,000
