= 1986–87 Coventry City F.C. season =

- Manager: (England) John Sillett
- Stadium: Highfield Road
- First Division: 10th
- FA Cup: Winners
- League Cup: Fourth round
- Full Members Cup: Second round
- Top goalscorer: League: Cyrille Regis (12); All: Cyrille Regis (16)

During the 1986–87 English football season, Coventry City competed in the Football League First Division.

== Season summary ==
Coventry City won the FA Cup, defeating Tottenham Hotspur, who had spent much of the season competing for a unique domestic treble of the league and the League and FA Cups, 3–2 in a final considered by many to be one of the greatest FA Cup finals of all time. The FA Cup triumph was Coventry's first (and, as of 2024, only) major trophy. The only downside to Coventry's victory was UEFA's decision to extend the ban on English teams competing in European competition to a third season, denying Coventry a place in the European Cup Winners' Cup.

== Players ==
=== First-team squad ===
Squad at end of season

Note: Flags indicate national team as defined under FIFA eligibility rules; some limited exceptions apply. Players may hold more than one non-FIFA nationality.

Pos.	Nation	Player
GK	ENG	Steve Ogrizovic
DF	ENG	Micky Adams
DF	ENG	Brian Borrows
DF	ENG	Tony Dobson
DF	ENG	Greg Downs
DF	ENG	Brian Kilcline (captain)
DF	ENG	Martin Lane
DF	ENG	Trevor Peake
DF	ENG	Graham Rodger (Note: Rodger was born in Glasgow, Scotland, but also qualified to represent England internationally and represented them at U-21 level.)
DF	ENG	Steve Sedgley
MF	ENG	Dave Bennett

Pos.	Nation	Player
MF	ENG	Micky Gynn
MF	ENG	Lloyd McGrath
MF	ENG	Nick Pickering
MF	ENG	David Smith
MF	WAL	David Phillips (Note: Phillips was born in Wegberg, West Germany (now Germany), but also qualified to represent Wales internationally and made his international debut for Wales in May 1984.)
FW	ENG	Paul Culpin
FW	ENG	Keith Houchen
FW	ENG	Steve Livingstone
FW	ENG	Ian Painter
FW	ENG	Cyrille Regis (Note: Regis was born in Maripasoula, French Guiana, and qualified to represent France internationally, but was raised in England from the age of 5 and represented them at U-21 and B level before making his international debut for England in February 1982.)

=== Left club during season ===
Note: Flags indicate national team as defined under FIFA eligibility rules; some limited exceptions apply. Players may hold more than one non-FIFA nationality.

Pos. / Nation / Player; MF / ENG / Andy Williams (to Rotherham United)	Pos. / Nation / Player; FW / ENG / Gareth Evans (to Rotherham United)

== Transfers ==
=== In ===
- David Phillips - Manchester City
- Keith Houchen - Scunthorpe United, July, £60,000
- Nick Pickering - Sunderland

=== Out ===
- Andy Williams - Rotherham United, October

== Results ==
=== FA Cup ===
==== Third round ====
- Coventry City 3–0 Bolton Wanderers

==== Fourth round ====
- Manchester United 0–1 Coventry City

==== Fifth round ====
- Stoke City 0–1 Coventry City

==== Sixth Round ====
- Sheffield Wednesday 1–3 Coventry City

==== Semi-final ====
12 April 1987

Coventry City	3–2 (a.e.t.)	Leeds United
Gynn 68'; Houchen 77'; Bennett 99'	Report	Rennie 14'; Edwards 83'

Hillsborough Stadium, Sheffield
Attendance: 51,372
Referee: Roger Milford

==== Final ====
16 May 1987

Coventry City	3–2 (a.e.t.)	Tottenham Hotspur
Bennett 9'; Houchen 64'; Mabbutt (o.g.) 96'		C. Allen 2'; Mabbutt 40'

Wembley, London
Attendance: 98,000
Referee: Neil Midgley (Manchester)

Coventry	Tottenham

After only two minutes, Clive Allen scored his 49th goal of the season, heading past keeper Steve Ogrizovic at the near-post from a perfect Chris Waddle cross. Within seven minutes though, the Sky Blues were level through Dave Bennett, a Cup Final loser in 1981 for Manchester City, ironically at the hands of Spurs.

The London club were back in front five minutes before the break through past defender Gary Mabbutt. Midway through the second half Coventry were level again – Bennett's pinpoint cross from the right was met by striker Keith Houchen with a diving header for a memorable goal.

The scores stayed level until full-time and the game went into extra time. Six minutes in, Mabbutt scored an own goal after Lloyd McGrath centred the ball and it took a deflection off of the Spurs defender's knee and over keeper Ray Clemence.

=== English League Cup ===
==== Second round ====
- Coventry City 4-2 Rotherham United (On aggregate)
- 1st Leg, Coventry City 3-2 Rotherham United
- 2nd Leg, Rotherham United 0-1 Coventry City

==== Third round ====
- Coventry City 2-1 Oldham Athletic

==== Fourth round ====
- Coventry City 0-0 Liverpool
- Replay, Liverpool 3-1 Coventry City
