= Jimmy Whitehouse =

Jimmy Whitehouse may refer to:

- Jimmy Whitehouse (footballer, born 1873)
- Jimmy Whitehouse (footballer, born 1924)
- Jimmy Whitehouse (footballer, born 1934)
