= Barry Powell (footballer) =

English footballer

Personal information
- Date of birth: 29 January 1954 (age 72)
- Place of birth: Kenilworth, England
- Height: 5 ft 8 in (1.73 m)
- Position: Midfielder

Senior career*
Years	Team	Apps	(Gls)
1972–1975	Wolverhampton Wanderers	64	(7)
1975	Portland Timbers	18	(4)
1975–1979	Coventry City	164	(27)
1979–1982	Derby County	86	(7)
1981	→ Portland Timbers (loan)	23	(2)
1982–1984	Bulova	-	(-)
1984–1985	Burnley	11	(0)
1984–1985	Swansea City	8	(0)
1985–1986	South China	-	(-)
1986–1988	Wolverhampton Wanderers	14	(0)
Total		388	(61)

International career
1974	England U23	4	(0)

Managerial career
- 1999–2001: Aberystwyth Town
- 2003–2004: Hednesford Town
- * Club domestic league appearances and goals

Barry Powell (born 29 January 1954) is an English former footballer who played in the Football League for Wolverhampton Wanderers, Coventry City, Derby County, Burnley and Swansea City, in the North American Soccer League for the Portland Timbers, and in Hong Kong for Bulova and South China.

== Career ==
Powell was born in Kenilworth, Warwickshire. Barry began his career as an apprentice at Wolverhampton Wanderers, making his first team debut on 10 March 1973 in a 1–1 draw at Crystal Palace. He featured regularly over the next two seasons, and appeared as a substitute in their 1974 League Cup Final win over Manchester City at Wembley. This year also saw him make four appearances for the England Under 23 side.

After a stint during the summer of 1975 with Portland Timbers of the North American Soccer League, The midfielder moved to Coventry City in September 1975 for £75,000. Here, he established himself as an attacking midfielder who possessed a mean shot, complementing Terry Yorath in the engine room of Gordon Milne's team and feeding such players as Ian Wallace, Mick Ferguson and Tommy Hutchison. He was voted Player of the Season in 1978–79 after an exceptional campaign.

He transferred to Derby County in October 1979 but failed to replicate the form he had shown at Coventry during his three seasons here. He then had stints in Hong Kong as well as with Burnley and Swansea City.

He eventually returned to Wolves in November 1986 and made a handful of appearances with the club now mired in the fourth tier, while also a member of their coaching staff. The 1987–88 season saw him play one further game in October 1987 en route to promotion before hanging up his boots.

Powell later returned to Coventry City to manage their football in the community scheme before he went on to manage Welsh Premier League club Aberystwyth Town, and English non-league sides Moor Green, Stafford Rangers and Hednesford Town (two spells), winning the FA Trophy with the latter in 2004. He was last employed by Solihull Moors as an assistant to manager Marcus Bignot before leaving the club in September 2011 after the club's poor start to the season.

Barry now works part time in a supermarket.

== Honours ==
Wolverhampton Wanderers

- Football League Cup: 1973–74
