= Jim Blyth (footballer, born 1955) =

Scottish footballer and coach

Personal information
- Full name: James Anton Blyth
- Date of birth: 2 February 1955 (age 71)
- Place of birth: Perth, Scotland
- Position: Goalkeeper

Senior career*
Years	Team	Apps	(Gls)
1971–1972	Preston North End	1	(0)
1972–1982	Coventry City	151	(0)
1975	→ Hereford United (loan)	7	(0)
1982–1985	Birmingham City	14	(0)
1985–1986	Nuneaton Borough	14	(0)
Total		187	(0)

International career
1978	Scotland	2	(0)
- * Club domestic league appearances and goals

James Anton Blyth (born 2 February 1955) is a Scottish former football goalkeeper and coach. He played for Preston North End, Coventry City, Hereford United, Birmingham City and Nuneaton Borough. Blyth also represented Scotland twice and was selected for their 1978 FIFA World Cup squad. He has since worked for Coventry City, Celtic and Middlesbrough as a goalkeeping coach.

== Playing career ==
Blyth played for Coventry City from 1972 to 1982, making 151 league appearances. His ability led to a proposed £440,000 transfer to Manchester United in 1979 which failed to go through when he failed a medical on a suspect back. This move would have made him the world's most expensive goalkeeper. He earned two caps for the Scotland national football team, and was Scotland's second-choice goalkeeper at the 1978 FIFA World Cup. The 1977–78 season saw Jim playing in Coventry's most exciting top-flight team. A side containing Mick Ferguson, Ian Wallace, Terry Yorath, Graham Oakey, Bobby McDonald and Tommy Hutchison played a brand of attacking football that swept many teams aside, often by large margins of victory. One of the most memorable games of that year came at Christmas when Norwich City visited Highfield Road. The game reached its zenith in the final minutes when Blyth saved John Ryan's penalty kick to help Coventry to a 5–4 victory. In the same season he was Man of the Match in the home game against Liverpool when he turned in a faultless performance in a 1–0 victory, making several saves in particular from David Fairclough and a penalty from Phil Neal.

He was also a player of Preston North End (1970–1972), Hereford United (1975, on loan), and Birmingham City, when he moved from Coventry City in 1982. During his spell at Birmingham he fractured his forearm in three places during a game against Sunderland, playing for a full 70 minutes injured. The Blues still went on to win the game 2–1. He finished his career with Conference side Nuneaton Borough in the 1985–86 season.

== Coaching career ==
Blyth was a goalkeeping coach under Gordon Strachan when he was the manager at Coventry City, but departed when Strachan and assistant Garry Pendrey were dismissed from their posts in 2001. During his time at Coventry he was responsible for the signing of 16-year-old Chris Kirkland, who went on to play first team football for the Sky Blues before smashing the British transfer fee for a goalkeeper (£6 million) when bought by Liverpool in August 2001. Blyth has worked with several International goalkeepers including, Artur Boruc, David Marshall, Magnus Hedman and Chris Kirkland.

Blyth was the goalkeeping coach at Celtic, joining them in July 2005, appointed by Gordon Strachan. While Blyth was with 'the Bhoys', the club won three SPL titles, the Scottish Cup and Scottish League Cup twice, and qualified for the knockout stage of the UEFA Champions League in two consecutive seasons, 2006–07 and 2007–08. This run included taking AC Milan into extra time in the San Siro before losing to 0–1 to the eventual champions. He and Garry Pendrey left Celtic after the resignation of Gordon Strachan in May 2009. He reunited with them at Middlesbrough in May 2010.

== Sources ==
- Brown, Jim (2000). Coventry: An Illustrated History. Desert Island Books Ltd. ISBN 1-874287-36-8.
