= Ken Dugdale =

English footballer and manager

Personal information
- Full name: Kenneth William Dugdale
- Date of birth: 7 December 1950 (age 75)
- Place of birth: Liverpool, England
- Position: Striker

Team information
- Current team: Vollen UL (manager)

Youth career
- Kirkby Town
- 1966–1968: Aston Villa
- Wolverhampton Wanderers

Senior career*
Years	Team	Apps	(Gls)
1970–1972	Wigan Athletic		
- New Brighton
- Burscough

Managerial career
- 1998–2002: New Zealand
- 2002–2003: Football Kingz
- 2008–: Vollen UL
Medal record
Men's football
Representing New Zealand (as manager)
OFC Nations Cup
Winner	1998 Australia
Runner-up	2000 Tahiti
- * Club domestic league appearances and goals

Kenneth William Dugdale (born 7 December 1950) is an English association football coach and former player, who manages Norwegian club Vollen UL.

== Career ==
Born in Liverpool, Dugdale spent his early career with Kirkby Town, Aston Villa and Wolverhampton Wanderers.

He later played non-league football with Wigan Athletic, New Brighton and Burscough.

Dugdale later became a football coach, and was manager of the New Zealand national team from 1998 to 2002. Dugdale was in charge of New Zealand at the 1999 FIFA Confederations Cup, and has also managed the Football Kingz.

During his time with New Zealand Soccer, Dugdale combined the position of All Whites head coach with that of director of football. After his tenure, New Zealand Soccer separated the two positions, appointing a dedicated director of football responsible for areas including coach education and player development.

Dugdale led New Zealand at the 1999 FIFA Confederations Cup in Mexico, the country's first appearance at the competition. New Zealand faced the United States, Germany and Brazil, losing 2–1, 2–0 and 2–0 respectively. Despite the three defeats, New Zealand Football describes the team's performances against the three opponents as a notable period for the national side.

He has also managed Vollen UL in Norway.

== Personal life ==
His uncle Jimmy Dugdale and brother Alan were also footballers.

== Honours ==
=== Manager ===
New Zealand

- OFC Nations Cup: 1998; Runner-up, 2000
