= Jimmy Dugdale =

English footballer

Personal information
- Full name: James Robert Dugdale
- Date of birth: 15 January 1932
- Place of birth: Liverpool, Lancashire, England
- Date of death: 26 February 2008 (aged 76)
- Place of death: England
- Position: Centre-half

Youth career
- 19??–1950: Harrowby F.C.
- 1950–1952: West Bromwich Albion (amateur)

Senior career*
Years	Team	Apps	(Gls)
1952–1956	West Bromwich Albion	63	(0)
1956–1962	Aston Villa	215	(3)
1962–1963	Queens Park Rangers	10	(0)
Total		288	(3)

International career
1954–1954	England B	3	(0)
- * Club domestic league appearances and goals

James Robert Dugdale (15 January 1932 – 26 February 2008) was an English professional footballer best known for his career with Aston Villa, with whom he won a FA Cup winner's medal in 1957, 2nd Division Championship 1960, Inaugural League Cup Winner 1961. His playing position was Centre-Half (i.e. centre-back in current parlance).

Before playing for Villa, Dugdale started his career at Harrowby F.C. (Wallasey) before moving to West Bromwich Albion, with whom he won a FA Cup winner's medal in 1954. Dugdale was selected on three occasions for England B, while he also represented the FA XI and the Football League XI in 1953–54. He moved to Queens Park Rangers in October 1962, before retiring from the game due to injury in May 1963.

Dugdale had a leg amputated in 1993. He died aged 76 after a long illness, leaving wife Dorothy, daughters Debbie and Nicola and son Russell. A tribute to Dugdale was held at The Hawthorns on 1 March 2008 for West Bromwich Albion's match against Plymouth Argyle. As well as a minute's applause prior to kickoff, players from both teams wore black armbands during the game.

His nephews Ken Dugdale and Alan Dugdale were also footballers.

== Honours ==
West Bromwich Albion

- FA Cup: 1953–54

Aston Villa

- FA Cup: 1956–57
- Football League Cup: 1960–61
