= Norman Lockhart (footballer) =

Irish footballer (1924–1993)

Personal information
- Full name: Norman Lockhart
- Date of birth: 4 March 1924
- Place of birth: Belfast, Northern Ireland
- Date of death: 19 August 1993 (aged 69)
- Place of death: Belfast, Northern Ireland
- Height: 5 ft 6 in (1.68 m)
- Position: Outside left

Youth career
- –1940: Windsor Star

Senior career*
Years	Team	Apps	(Gls)
1940–1944	Distillery		
1944–1946	Linfield		
1946–1947	Swansea Town	47	(13)
1947–1952	Coventry City	181	(41)
1952–1956	Aston Villa	74	(10)
1956–1958	Bury	42	(6)
1958–1959	Ards		
Total		344+	(70+)

International career
1946–1950	Ireland (IFA)	2	(2)
1951–1956	Northern Ireland	6	(1)
- * Club domestic league appearances and goals

Norman Lockhart (4 March 1924 – 19 August 1993) was a professional footballer from Northern Ireland. Despite being naturally right footed Lockhart played as an outside left for Distillery, Linfield, Swansea Town, Coventry City, Aston Villa, Bury and Ards. He represented the Northern Ireland national football team eight times between 1946 and 1956. He scored two goals in his international debut against England at Windsor Park, Belfast in 1946.

== Career statistics ==
=== Club ===
Club	Division	Season	League		Cup		Europe		Total	
Club	Division	Season	Apps	Goals	Apps	Goals	Apps	Goals	Apps	Goals
Linfield	–	1944–45 (Note: Northern Regional League – An unofficial league which ran for seven seasons between 1940 and 1947, set up while the Irish league was suspended as a result of World War II.)	-		-		-		-	
Linfield	–	1945–46 (Note: See Note 1.)	-		-		-		-	
Linfield	-	Total	-		-		-		-	
Swansea Town	2	1946–47	34	11	-		-		34	11
Swansea Town	3	1947–48	13	2	-		-		13	2
Swansea Town	-	Total	47	13	-		-		47	13
Coventry City	2	1947–48	31	6	2	1	-		33	7
Coventry City	2	1948–49	30	5	1	0	-		31	5
Coventry City	2	1949–50	32	7	-		-		32	7
Coventry City	2	1950–51	38	7	1	0	-		39	7
Coventry City	2	1951–52	42	15	3	2	-		45	17
Coventry City	3	1952–53	8	1	-		-		8	1
Coventry City	-	Total	181	41	7	3	-		188	44
Aston Villa	1	1952–53	14	1	2	0	-		16	1
Aston Villa	1	1953–54	18	2	-		-		18	2
Aston Villa	1	1954–55	25	3	7	2	-		32	5
Aston Villa	1	1955–56	17	4	2	0	-		19	4
Aston Villa	-	Total	74	10	11	2	-		85	12
Bury	2	1956–57	22	1	1	0	-		22	1
Bury	3	1957–58	20	5	1	0	-		20	5
Bury	-	Total	42	6	2	0	-		44	6
Ards	–	1958–59	-		-		1	0	1	0
Ards	-	Total	-		-		1	0	1	0
Career total			344	70	20	5	1	0	365	75

=== International ===
IFA XI/Northern Ireland
Year	Apps	Goals
1946	1	2
1950	1	0
1951	1	0
1952	1	0
1953	2	1
1955	1	0
1956	1	0
Total	8	3

== Honours ==
=== Club ===
==== Linfield ====
- Irish Cup Runner-up (1): 1943–44.
- Irish Cup Winner (2): 1944–45, 1945–56.
- Northern Regional League Champion (2): 1944–45, 1945–46.
