= Mick Coop =

English footballer (born 1948)

Personal information
- Full name: Michael Anthony Coop
- Date of birth: 10 July 1948 (age 78)
- Place of birth: Grimsby, England
- Height: 5 ft 11 in (1.80 m)
- Position: Right back

Youth career
- 1963–1966: Coventry City

Senior career*
Years	Team	Apps	(Gls)
1966–1981	Coventry City	425	(18)
1974–1975	→ York City (loan)	4	(0)
1979	→ Detroit Express (loan)	13	(0)
1981–1982	Derby County	18	(2)
1984	AP Leamington	3	(0)
Total		460	(20)

Managerial career
- Coventry City (assistant)
- * Club domestic league appearances and goals

Michael Anthony Coop (born 10 July 1948) is an English former professional footballer, who played as a right back.

Born in Grimsby, Lincolnshire, Coop grew up in Leamington Spa, Warwickshire, where he was an excellent school boy cricketer and footballer. He joined Coventry City F.C. as an apprentice in 1962. In January 1966, he turned professional with Coventry and soon made his first team debut. A run of poor form during the 1974-1975 season led to the exciting Graham Oakey replacing him on the back line and Coop went on loan to York City F.C. for four games. When he returned to Coventry, he regained his starting position.

In the summer of 1979, Coventry sent him on loan to the Detroit Express of the North American Soccer League. In July 1981, he transferred to Derby County F.C. for £20,000 where he played half a season before retiring in January 1982. He later played a few games for AP Leamington. After retirement he worked as a coach at Coventry City and was an antiques dealer.

He and his wife live in Wellesbourne, Warwickshire.

== Honours ==
- Coventry City F.C. Hall of Fame
