= Arthur Lightening =

South African soccer player

Personal information
- Full name: Arthur Lightening
- Date of birth: 1 August 1936
- Place of birth: Durban, South Africa
- Date of death: 2001
- Position: Goalkeeper

Senior career*
Years	Team	Apps	(Gls)
1953–1955	Durban Railways		
1956	Queen's Park AFC		
1956–1958	Nottingham Forest	6	(0)
1958–1962	Coventry City	150	(0)
1962–1963	Middlesbrough	15	(0)
1963–1968	Durban United	123	(0)
1969–1972	Stella		
- * Club domestic league appearances and goals

Arthur Lightening (1 August 1936 - 2001) was a South African footballer who played as a goalkeeper in the Football League for Coventry City, Middlesbrough and Nottingham Forest.

== Early life ==
Lightening was born in Durban, South Africa on 1 August 1936. He went to Mansfield High School.

== Career ==
Lightening played for Nottingham Forest until 1958, when he signed for Coventry City. He made his debut against Hartlepool United on 13 December of that year and went on to make over one hundred and fifty appearances for the club. He later played for Middlesbrough.
