= Ernie Hunt =

English footballer (1943-2018)

Personal information
- Full name: Roger Patrick Hunt
- Date of birth: 17 March 1943
- Place of birth: Swindon, England
- Date of death: 20 June 2018 (aged 75)
- Place of death: Gloucestershire, England
- Height: 5 ft 7 in (1.70 m)
- Position: Inside forward

Youth career
- 1957–1959: Swindon Town

Senior career*
Years	Team	Apps	(Gls)
1959–1965	Swindon Town	214	(82)
1965–1967	Wolverhampton Wanderers	74	(32)
1967	→ Los Angeles Wolves	10	(4)
1967–1968	Everton	14	(3)
1968–1973	Coventry City	146	(45)
1973	→ Doncaster Rovers (loan)	9	(1)
1973–1974	Bristol City	12	(2)
1974–?	Atherstone Town		
- Ledbury Town
Total		479+	(169+)

International career
1963–1966	England U23	3	(0)
- * Club domestic league appearances and goals

Roger Patrick "Ernie" Hunt (17 March 1943 – 20 June 2018) was an English footballer who played in the Football League for Swindon Town, Wolverhampton Wanderers, Everton, Coventry City, Doncaster Rovers and Bristol City, and for the Los Angeles Wolves in the United Soccer Association. At international level, he was capped three times for the England under-23 team. He was known as "Ernie" – a contraction of Ernest, his father's name – to avoid confusion with Liverpool and England striker Roger Hunt. In 1971 he was the winner of the inaugural BBC Goal of the Season award.

== Career ==
Born in Swindon, Hunt was working for British Rail when he was signed as an amateur by Swindon Town in 1957. He progressed through their youth ranks, made his debut on 15 September 1959 in a 3–0 defeat in the Third Division at Grimsby Town, which made him Swindon's youngest ever first-team player, aged 16 years 182 days, a record which stood until 1980, and signed professional forms in March 1960.

He finished as the club's top goalscorer for four consecutive seasons, and helped them win promotion to the Second Division in 1963. Hunt made his debut for the England under-23 team on 2 June 1963 in a 1–0 defeat to their Romanian counterparts, the first of three caps he won at that level. Swindon were relegated at the end of the 1964–65 campaign, and Hunt left to join Wolverhampton Wanderers in September 1965, for a fee of £40,000, which was at the time Swindon's record transfer receipt. In all competitions, he scored 88 goals from 237 games for Swindon.

Hunt was Wolves' leading scorer with 20 goals as they won promotion to the First Division in 1966–67, and was part of the Wolves squad who, playing as the Los Angeles Wolves, won the 1967 United Soccer Association title. However, he made just six outings in the top flight for Wolves before the club sold him to Everton for £80,000 in September 1967. His time at Goodison Park was short-lived as he failed to settle, making only 12 appearances before a £65,000 transfer to Coventry City in March 1968, just six months after arriving.

The striker was a fans' favourite during his five-year spell at Coventry and scored one of the most famous goals in English football history in October 1970, against his previous team Everton. Awarded a free kick just outside the penalty area, Willie Carr gripped the ball between his heels and flicked it up for Hunt to volley home. The match was televised on BBC's Match of the Day, and the goal was awarded the programme's Goal of the Season, so gained huge fame. The move was outlawed at the end of the season.

He spent a loan spell at Doncaster Rovers before leaving Coventry to join Bristol City, where he ended his league career in the 1973–74 season. He subsequently served a number of non-League clubs.

== Life after football ==
After retiring from the game, he did a variety of jobs, including running a pub in Ledbury, Herefordshire, called The Full Pitcher and window cleaning. In 2008, he was living in Gloucester.

Hunt died on 20 June 2018 aged 75 in a care home. He had been suffering from Alzheimer's disease.

== Honours ==
Los Angeles Wolves

- United Soccer Association: 1967

Coventry City

- Coventry City Hall of Fame
