= Ian Wallace (footballer, born 1956) =

Scottish footballer and manager

Personal information
- Full name: Ian Andrew Wallace
- Date of birth: 23 May 1956 (age 70)
- Place of birth: Glasgow, Scotland
- Position: Striker

Senior career*
Years	Team	Apps	(Gls)
1973–1974	Yoker Athletic		
1974–1976	Dumbarton	34	(11)
1976–1980	Coventry City	130	(58)
1980–1984	Nottingham Forest	134	(36)
1984	Brest	16	(3)
1984–1986	Sunderland	34	(6)
1986–1987	Marítimo	9	(0)
1987	Melbourne Croatia	24	(6)
Total		351	(120)

International career
1977	Scotland U21	1	(2)
1978–1979	Scotland	3	(1)

Managerial career
- 1996–1999: Dumbarton
- * Club domestic league appearances and goals

Ian Andrew Wallace (born 23 May 1956) is a Scottish former football player and manager. He played as a striker in the 1970s and 1980s for Dumbarton, Coventry City, Nottingham Forest, Brest, Sunderland, Marítimo and Melbourne Croatia. Wallace played in three international matches for Scotland in the late 1970s.

== Playing career ==
=== Career in Scotland ===
Born in Glasgow, Wallace started at Scottish Junior club Yoker Athletic. He then joined the senior ranks with Scottish Football League club Dumbarton.

=== Coventry City ===
Wallace was purchased for £70,000 by the then Coventry manager Gordon Milne in 1976. Milne paired his small frame with his larger strike partner Mick Ferguson. He emerged from a car accident whilst at the club sporting a deep scar on the forehead. He also suffered a detached retina whilst playing for Coventry at Norwich. Coventry finished 7th in the 1977-78 Football League, their second best ever placing after the team of 1969–70. Unlike in 1969-70 they missed out on a UEFA competition place. Wallace played that season alongside Ferguson, Tommy Hutchison, Terry Yorath, Graham Oakey, Bobby MacDonald and Jim Blyth. Wallace scored 23 goals that season, his first of three in a row as Coventry's top scorer. He was later inducted in to the Coventry City Hall of Fame.

=== Nottingham Forest ===
Wallace moved to then-reigning European champions Nottingham Forest in July 1980 for £1.25 million, making him one of the world's most expensive players. Wallace went on to be Forest's top scorer for the first three of the four seasons he played there, scoring 13 goals in each season he top scored.

=== Later career ===
Wallace moved to French club Brest for a short spell in 1984. He returned to English football with Sunderland around New Year in season 1984–85.

In 1986 he joined Portuguese club Marítimo. In 1987 he signed for Melbourne Croatia in Australia, where he ended his playing career.

=== International ===
Wallace scored his on his full international debut, a 2–1 win against Bulgaria in February 1978. Coventry team-mate Jim Blyth was in goal for Scotland. He then came on as a substitute in a 1–0 defeat in Portugal in November 1978 and started in a 3–0 loss in Wales in May of the following year. All three of his caps came when he was playing for Coventry City.

== Managerial career ==
Wallace returned to Dumbarton as manager in November 1996 replacing Jim Fallon. He was dismissed from this job in October 1999 and was replaced by Jimmy Brown.

=== Statistics ===
As of March 1999

Team	Nat	From	To	Record				
Team	Nat	From	To	G	W	D	L	Win %
Dumbarton	(Scotland)	November 1996	March 1999	75	26	24	25	34.67

== Honours ==
Sunderland

- Football League Cup runner-up: 1984–85

Individual

- Coventry City Hall of Fame
