= Wilf Smith (footballer, born 1946) =

English footballer (born 1946)

Personal information
- Full name: Wilfred Samuel Smith
- Date of birth: 3 September 1946 (age 80)
- Place of birth: Neumünster, Germany
- Height: 5 ft 10 in (1.78 m)
- Position: Full-back

Youth career
- Sheffield Boys
- 1962–1963: Sheffield Wednesday

Senior career*
Years	Team	Apps	(Gls)
1963–1970	Sheffield Wednesday	206	(4)
1970–1975	Coventry City	135	(1)
1974	→ Brighton & Hove Albion (loan)	5	(0)
1975	→ Millwall (loan)	5	(0)
1975–1976	Bristol Rovers	54	(2)
1976–1978	Chesterfield	27	(2)
Total		432	(9)

International career
- England Youth
1969–1970	England U23	6	(0)
- * Club domestic league appearances and goals

Wilfred Samuel Smith (born Schmidt, 3 September 1946) is an English former professional footballer who played as a full-back in the Football League for six different teams between 1963 and 1978.

== Career ==
Born in Neumünster, Germany, Smith moved to Britain with his family when he was a child. They anglicised their surname from Schmidt to Smith at this time. He joined Sheffield Wednesday after leaving school, and captained both Sheffield Boys and England youth.

Smith initially joined Wednesday as an apprentice in 1962, but turned professional with them in September 1963 when he turned 17. In all he made 206 League appearances for The Owls, scoring four times, before leaving to join Coventry City in 1970. He played 135 League matches in a five-year stay with the Sky Blues, but he found himself loaned out to both Brighton & Hove Albion and Millwall in his final season with the Midland club.

He rounded off his footballing career with a 20-month spell at Bristol Rovers between March 1975 and November 1976, followed by nineteen months at Chesterfield. He played a total of 432 Football League games, and scored nine goals during his career.

After hanging up his boots, Smith moved into retail, and in 1994 he was reputed to have become a millionaire through his off-the-field business.

== Honours ==
Sheffield Wednesday

- FA Cup runner-up: 1965–66
