= Ernie Machin =

English footballer

Personal information
- Date of birth: 26 April 1944
- Place of birth: Walkden, Lancashire, England
- Date of death: 22 July 2012 (aged 68)
- Place of death: Coventry, England
- Position: Midfielder

Youth career
- 19??–1962: Nelson
- 1962–1963: Coventry City

Senior career*
Years	Team	Apps	(Gls)
1963–1972	Coventry City	257	(33)
1972–1974	Plymouth Argyle	57	(6)
1974–1976	Brighton & Hove Albion	64	(2)
Total		378	(42)
- * Club domestic league appearances and goals

Ernie Machin (26 April 1944 – 22 July 2012) was an English professional footballer who played as a midfielder.

After unsuccessful trials with Bolton he was playing for Nelson, when Coventry City scout Alf Walton recommended him to Jimmy Hill, then the Coventry manager, and he became one of Hill's first signings in 1962. He made his debut against Millwall on 8 April 1963 and went on to make 289 appearances for the club, a figure which would have been considerably higher had it not been for long-term knee injuries. He was a key player in Coventry's promotions from Division Three in 1964 and Division Two in 1967, scoring 11 goals in the latter season including several late winning goals and the first goal in the classic 3–1 victory over Wolves in April 1967.

After leaving Coventry in 1972 he spent two years with Plymouth Argyle and made such an impression that he was inducted into their Hall of Fame in 2004, and was also included in their Team of the Century. He finished his playing career with Brighton & Hove Albion before returning to Coventry City as a coach in 1976. He died in July 2012 after several years of poor health but was able to attend a reunion of the 1967 promotion team in 2007 and the CCFPA Legends'Days in 2011 & 2012.

In 1972, he became the first English football player to successfully challenge a fine and suspension by the Football Association in the English courts. He was sent off in a game apparently for kicking an opponent, however TV evidence showed that he was innocent; nevertheless the FA noticed something else which he had done and upheld the disciplinary action on the basis of that without allowing him to present a defence. The courts ruled against the FA, and the PFA established the rights of players to legal representation in disciplinary cases.

He died in July 2012, aged 68.

== Honours ==
- Coventry City Hall of Fame
