= Willie Carr =

Scottish footballer (born 1950)

Personal information
- Full name: Willam McInanny Carr
- Date of birth: 6 January 1950 (age 76)
- Place of birth: Glasgow, Scotland
- Position: Midfielder

Senior career*
Years	Team	Apps	(Gls)
1967–1975	Coventry City	252	(33)
1975–1982	Wolverhampton Wanderers	237	(21)
1982–1983	Millwall	8	(1)
1983	Worcester City	15	(1)
1983–1984	Willenhall Town	23	(0)
1985–1987	Stafford Rangers		
1987–1988	Stourbridge		
Total		591	(56)

International career
1969–1972	Scotland U23	4	(0)
1970–1972	Scotland	6	(0)
- * Club domestic league appearances and goals

William McInanny Carr (born 6 January 1950) is a Scottish former footballer, who played in the Football League for Coventry City, Wolverhampton Wanderers and Millwall. During his time with Coventry, Carr played in six full international matches for Scotland. He later played in non-league football for Worcester City, Willenhall Town, Maidstone United, Stafford Rangers and Stourbridge.

== Background ==
Carr was born in Glasgow. He spent part of his formative teenage years in Cambridge, where his family relocated in 1963.

== Playing career ==
=== Coventry City ===
The midfielder had joined Coventry in 1967 as an apprentice debuting as a substitute against Arsenal that year. Along with Ernie Hunt and the likes of Neil Martin and Dennis Mortimer he was part of the Coventry side that achieved the club's highest ever league finish – sixth in 1970, meriting a place in the 1970–71 Inter-Cities Fairs Cup the season after. He is famed for the donkey kick goal scored for Coventry City against Everton in October 1970. He took a free kick by gripping the ball between his ankles and flicking it up for Ernie Hunt to volley home. The move gained widespread fame as the match was televised on Match of the Day, and moved the authorities to ban the technique at the end of the season.

Carr struggled with a knee injury (suffered against Liverpool in April 1973), before leaving for £80,000 in March 1975. He scored 37 goals in 292 games in all competitions for the Sky Blues.

=== Scotland ===
During his time with Coventry he won 6 caps for Scotland between 1970 and 1972. His international debut came on 18 April 1970 in a 1–0 win in Northern Ireland.

=== Wolverhampton Wanderers ===
He joined Wolverhampton Wanderers debuting against Chelsea in the same month, scoring once in a memorable 7–1 victory. He was a first-choice player and helped his new side to win the 1976–77 Football League Second Division and the 1980 Football League Cup Final. He finally left Wolves in Summer 1982 shortly after they were relegated from the top flight. In total, he made 289 appearances for the club, scoring 26 times.

=== Millwall & non-league ===
He next joined Millwall. He stayed for only six months at the London club before returning to the Midlands. He had spells at Worcester City, Willenhall Town and Stourbridge in non-League football before calling time on his playing career in 1988.

== After football ==
He became a rep for an engineering supplies firm in the Birmingham area.

== Honours ==
Wolverhampton Wanderers

- Football League Second Division: 1976–77
- Football League Cup: 1979–80

Individual

- Coventry City Hall of Fame
