= Mick Kearns (footballer, born 1938) =

English footballer

Personal information
- Full name: Michael David Kearns
- Date of birth: 10 March 1938 (age 88)
- Place of birth: Nuneaton, England
- Positions: Full back; wing half

Youth career
- 1953–1955: Stockingford Victoria
- 1955–1956: Coventry City

Senior career*
| Years | Team | Apps | (Gls) |
| 1956–1969 | Coventry City | 344 | (14) |
| Total | | 344 | (14) |
- * Club domestic league appearances and goals

Michael David Kearns (born 10 March 1938) is an English former professional footballer who played as a full back and wing half for Stockingford Victoria and Coventry City.

== Career ==
Born in Nuneaton, where his family ran a bingo hall, Kearns played as an amateur for Stockingford Victoria whilst working as a motor mechanic at the Massey Ferguson tractor factory. He signed for Coventry City in 1955 and played for Coventry in all four divisions of the Football League, and five in total including Division Three South, after turning professional in 1956. With Coventry he won a Third Division medal in 1964 and a Second Division medal in 1967. He retired from playing in May 1969 after a knee injury. He made a total of 385 appearances for the club, scoring 16 goals.

After retiring Kearns became a partner in the family bingo business. He returned to Coventry City in 1986 to work as reserve team coach, chief scout, and Youth Development Officer, before leaving in 1992 to work for the Post Office.

== Personal life ==
He married in 1965 and had two children and, as of June 2015, five grandchildren.
