= Bill Glazier =

English footballer

Personal information
- Full name: William James Glazier
- Date of birth: 2 August 1943 (age 83)
- Place of birth: Nottingham, England
- Height: 6 ft 0 in (1.83 m)
- Position: Goalkeeper

Youth career
- –1961: Crystal Palace

Senior career*
Years	Team	Apps	(Gls)
1961–1964	Crystal Palace	106	(0)
1964–1975	Coventry City	346	(0)
1975	Brentford	9	(0)
1977	St. Louis Stars	0	(0)
Total		461	(0)

International career
1964–1965	England U23	3	(0)
1970	Football League XI	1	(0)
- * Club domestic league appearances and goals

William James Glazier (born 2 August 1943) is an English retired professional footballer who played as a goalkeeper. He is best remembered for his time in the Football League with Coventry City, for whom he made over 390 appearances and is a member of the club's Hall of Fame. He was capped by England at U23 level and represented the Football League XI.

== Club career ==
=== Early years ===
Glazier's involvement in football began with a spell as a member of the ground staff at Third Division club Torquay United, before he was released due to lack of funds.

=== Crystal Palace ===
In October 1961, Glazier joined Third Division club Crystal Palace on trial, which was arranged by virtue of his family's bread delivery man being a personal friend of Palace captain Johnny McNichol. Glazier was signed on the strength of his performance for the Palace 'A' team in a match versus Dover. He quickly displaced Vic Rouse as first-choice goalkeeper and was an ever-present during the 1963–64 season, in which the club secured promotion to the Second Division with a runners-up finish. Glazier departed Selhurst Park in October 1964, after making 113 appearances for Palace.

=== Coventry City ===
In October 1964, the manager of Second Division club Coventry City, Jimmy Hill, signed Glazier for a then world-record fee for a goalkeeper of £35,000. Glazier suffered a broken leg in a match versus Manchester City in April 1965, which kept him out of the game for a year. He returned to play in the Coventry team which won the Second Division title in the 1966–67 season. Now playing in the First Division, Glazier continued as the club's first-choice goalkeeper until August 1975. He was awarded a testimonial in November 1974 versus an England 1966 World Cup XI, with Glazier scoring twice in a 6–6 draw. Glazier made 392 appearances in 11 years at Highfield Road. He twice won the Coventry City Player of the Year award (1968–69 and 1973–74) and was inducted into the club's Hall of Fame.

=== Brentford ===
Glazier dropped down to the Fourth Division to sign for Brentford for a £12,500 fee in August 1975. The move was helped along by Jimmy Hill (by now working as a broadcaster), who put Glazier in touch with Brentford manager John Docherty, who had been looking for a goalkeeper after loanee Steve Sherwood returned to Chelsea. Business interests and problems commuting from his Brighton home meant that Glazier couldn't give his full commitment to the Bees and he left the club after making just 12 appearances.

=== St. Louis Stars ===
Glazier ended his career with a spell at North American Soccer League club St. Louis Stars in 1977.

== International and representative career ==
Glazier won three caps for the England U23 team and kept a clean sheet in each match. One of Glazier's caps came against Romania at Highfield Road (home of his then-club side Coventry City) drew a crowd of 27,476, one of the highest attendances for an U23 match in England. A broken leg suffered with Coventry City in 1965 cut short Glazier's international career, as he was over the age-limit after returning to fitness. In March 1970, Glazer played for the Football League in a 3–2 win over its Scottish counterparts.

== Personal life ==
Early in his career, Glazier lived in Brighton, where his parents ran a guesthouse. After retiring from football, Glazier ran a hotel in Brighton before moving to Spain for 12 years, where he worked in swimming pool maintenance. He returned to the UK in 1998 and settled in Lincolnshire, where he began a catering business with his wife.

== Honours ==
Crystal Palace

- Football League Third Division second-place promotion (1): 1963–64

Coventry City

- Football League Second Division (1): 1966–67

Individual

- Coventry City Player of the Year (2): 1968–69, 1973–74
- Coventry City Hall of Fame

== Career statistics ==
Appearances and goals by club, season and competition
Club	Season	League			FA Cup		League Cup		Europe		Total	
Club	Season	Division	Apps	Goals	Apps	Goals	Apps	Goals	Apps	Goals	Apps	Goals
Coventry City	1964–65	Second Division	24	0	1	0	0	0	—		25	0
Coventry City	1965–66	Second Division	7	0	0	0	0	0	—		7	0
Coventry City	1966–67	Second Division	3	0	1	0	0	0	—		4	0
Coventry City	1967–68	First Division	40	0	2	0	1	0	—		43	0
Coventry City	1968–69	First Division	42	0	2	0	5	0	—		49	0
Coventry City	1969–70	First Division	40	0	2	0	1	0	—		43	0
Coventry City	1970–71	First Division	40	0	1	0	5	0	3 (Note: Appearances in Inter-Cities Fairs Cup)	0	49	0
Coventry City	1971–72	First Division	37	0	2	0	1	0	—		40	0
Coventry City	1972–73	First Division	28	0	4	0	2	0	—		34	0
Coventry City	1973–74	First Division	40	0	6	0	6	0	—		52	0
Coventry City	1974–75	First Division	7	0	0	0	1	0	—		8	0
Coventry City	Total		346	0	21	0	22	0	3	0	392	0
Brentford	1975–76	Fourth Division	9	0	—		3	0	—		12	0
Career total			355	0	21	0	25	0	3	0	404	0
