= Neil Ramsbottom =

English footballer

Personal information
- Full name: Neil Ramsbottom
- Date of birth: 25 February 1946 (age 80)
- Place of birth: Blackburn, England
- Height: 6 ft 0 in (1.83 m)
- Position: Goalkeeper

Youth career
- Bury

Senior career*
Years	Team	Apps	(Gls)
1965–1971	Bury	174	(0)
1971–1972	Blackpool	12	(0)
1972	→ Crewe Alexandra (loan)	3	(0)
1972–1975	Coventry City	51	(0)
1975–1976	Sheffield Wednesday	18	(0)
1976–1977	Plymouth Argyle	39	(0)
1977–1978	Blackburn Rovers	10	(0)
1978–1980	Sheffield United	2	(0)
1980–1983	Bradford City	73	(0)
1983–1984	Bournemouth	4	(0)
Total		386	(0)
- * Club domestic league appearances and goals

Neil Ramsbottom (born 26 February 1946) is an English retired association football goalkeeper who played for numerous clubs in the Football League during his career, including Bury, Coventry City, Plymouth Argyle, and Bradford City.

== Playing career ==
Ramsbottom began his professional career with local club Bury in 1965, where he made 174 league appearances before moving to Blackpool. He only spent one season there before joining Coventry City in 1972 where he made 51 league appearances in three years at Highfield Road. He left in 1975 to join Sheffield Wednesday but only spent one year there, making 18 league appearances. He then joined Plymouth Argyle in 1976, making 39 league appearances. He won the club's Player of the Year award in his one season at Home Park. He joined his hometown club, Blackburn Rovers, in 1977 where he made 10 league appearances before joining Sheffield United in 1978, but he was limited to just two league appearances.

He moved from Bramall Lane in 1980 to join Bradford City. He would feature regularly for the Bantams for the next three years, making 73 league appearances, before joining Bournemouth in 1983, his last Football League club. He made 4 league appearances for the club in the 1983–84 season before moving into non-league football with Chorley at the age of 39.
