= Mike Dixon (footballer, born 1937) =

English footballer (1937–2022)

Personal information
- Full name: Michael Dixon
- Date of birth: 14 March 1937
- Place of birth: Willesden, England
- Date of death: 13 November 2022 (aged 85)
- Position: Centre forward

Youth career
- Sundon Park

Senior career*
Years	Team	Apps	(Gls)
- Hitchin Town
1957–1961	Luton Town	3	(1)
1961–1962	Coventry City	18	(12)
- Cambridge United
- Stevenage Town
- Dunstable Town
- Biggleswade Town
Total		21+	(13+)
- * Club domestic league appearances and goals

Michael Dixon (14 March 1937 – 13 November 2022) was an English professional footballer who played as a centre forward.

== Career ==
Born in Willesden, Dixon played for Sundon Park, Hitchin Town, Luton Town, Coventry City, Cambridge United, Stevenage Town, Dunstable Town and Biggleswade Town. He also had trials at Arsenal and Brighton & Hove Albion.

== Personal life ==
His son Kerry was also a footballer. Dixon died on 13 November 2022, at the age of 85.
