= Coventry City F.C. in European football =

English club in European football

- Club: Coventry City
- Seasons played: 1
- First entry: 1970–71 Inter-Cities Fairs Cup
- Latest entry: 1970–71 Inter-Cities Fairs Cup

This is a brief history of Coventry City's appearances in European football. Their first and so far only season in major European cup competition came when they reached the second round of the Inter-Cities Fairs Cup in the 1970–71 season. They also took part in the Texaco Cup in the 1970s.

== Highest achievement per competition ==
Competition	Season(s)	Achievement
UEFA Cup Winners' Cup	1987–88 European Cup Winners' Cup	Qualified (not allowed to compete)
Inter-Cities Fairs Cup	1970–71 Inter-Cities Fairs Cup	2nd round
Texaco Cup	1971–72 Texaco Cup	Quarter-finals
Anglo Scottish Challenge	1987–88	Abandoned

== Overall record ==
Competition	Pld	W	D	L	GF	GA	GD
UEFA Champions League	0	0	0	0	0	0	0
UEFA Europa League	0	0	0	0	0	0	0
UEFA Conference League	0	0	0	0	0	0	0
UEFA Cup Winners' Cup	0	0	0	0	0	0	0
Inter-Cities Fairs Cup	4	3	0	1	8	8	0
Texaco Cup	8	1	2	5	10	15	−5
Anglo Scottish Challenge	1	0	1	0	1	1	0
Total	13	4	3	6	19	24	−5

== 1970–71 Inter-Cities Fairs Cup ==
The Sky Blues' maiden European voyage was the 1970–71 Inter-Cities Fairs Cup, which they took part in with fellow English clubs Newcastle United, Arsenal, Liverpool and eventual winners Leeds United. Coventry's first opponents were Bulgarian side Trakia Plovdiv. A 4–1 away win in which John O'Rourke scored a hat-trick was followed up with a 2–0 home win to send the English club through to face FC Bayern Munich. However, a 6–1 defeat at Grünwalder Stadion meant that a 2–1 win for Coventry in the second leg was not enough, and they were duly eliminated.

Season	Competition	Round	Opposition	Score
1970–71	Inter-Cities Fairs Cup	First round	(Bulgaria) Trakia Plovdiv	1–4 (A), 2–0 (H)
1970–71	Inter-Cities Fairs Cup	Second round	(West Germany) FC Bayern Munich	6–1 (A), 2–1 (H)

== 1971–74 Texaco Cup ==
Coventry entered the Texaco Cup for the first time in 1971–72 and faced Falkirk in the first round, and needed extra time to beat them, to set up a tie with Newcastle United. After a 1–1 draw at home, Coventry were roundly beaten 5–1 at St James' Park and exited the competition.

Season	Competition	Round	Opposition	Score
1971–72	Texaco Cup	First round	(Scotland) Falkirk	1–0 (A), 3–0 (H) (Note: After extra time)
1971–72	Texaco Cup	Second round	(England) Newcastle United	1–1 (H), 1–5 (A)

Coventry's second Texaco Cup campaign was even more brief than the first as Motherwell beat Coventry in the second leg after a drawn first leg to send the West Midlands club out.

Season	Competition	Round	Opposition	Score
1972–73	Texaco Cup	First round	(Scotland) Motherwell	3–3 (H), 1–0 (A)

Motherwell were again the first round opposition as Coventry embarked upon their third Texaco Cup tournament, and again the Lanarkshire club would frustrate them as wins home and away saw 'Well progress.

Season	Competition	Round	Opposition	Score
1973–74	Texaco Cup	First round	(Scotland) Motherwell	0–1 (H), 3–2 (A)

== 1985–91 ban on English clubs ==
English clubs were banned from taking part in European competition in the aftermath of the Heysel Stadium disaster in 1985. This affected the Sky Blues when they won the FA Cup in 1986–87. This achievement would normally be rewarded with a place in the 1987–88 European Cup Winners' Cup, however the ban meant they did not compete. The ban was in place until 1990–91, and England did not reacquire the full (pre-1985) number of places to award in European club competition until 1995–96. The FA Cup win coincided with an attempt to resurrect the Anglo-Scottish Cup in 1987–88 as the Anglo Scottish Challenge Cup. It saw Coventry pitted with 1986–87 Scottish Cup winners St Mirren, however poor attendances at the first leg (a 1–1 draw at Highfield Road) meant that the revival was halted, and the second leg was never played.

== 1987–88 Anglo-Scottish Challenge ==
In the 1987–88 season, an attempt was made to revive the competition as the Anglo-Scottish Challenge, pitting the holders of the FA Cup and Scottish Cup against each other, but after a poor attendance for the first leg between Coventry City and St Mirren the competition was shelved, with the second leg never played.
