= Alan Dugdale =

English footballer

Personal information
- Date of birth: 11 September 1952 (age 74)
- Place of birth: Kirkby, Liverpool, England
- Height: 5 ft 9 in (1.75 m)
- Position: Defender

Senior career*
Years	Team	Apps	(Gls)
1969–1977	Coventry City	142	(0)
1977–1979	Charlton Athletic	34	(0)
1979	→ Barnsley (loan)	7	(0)
1979–1980	Tulsa Roughnecks (indoor)	10	(1)
1980–1981	Tulsa Roughnecks	33	(0)

International career
1971	England Youth	7	(0)
- * Club domestic league appearances and goals

Alan Dugdale (born 11 September 1952 in Liverpool) is an English retired professional football central defender. He spent most of his career in England with one season in the North American Soccer League.

In 1969, Dugdale began his career with Coventry City. In 1970, he was part of the Coventry City youth team which lost the championship to Tottenham Hotspur. Dugdale did not break into the first team until 1974 and transferred to Charlton Athletic in October 1977 for £50,000. In the fall of 1979, he signed with the Tulsa Roughnecks as it prepared for the 1979–1980 North American Soccer League indoor season. He then played the entire 1980 and six games of the 1981 outdoor seasons. His uncle Jimmy Dugdale had an extensive career in the Football League., while his brother Ken Dugdale was manager of the New Zealand national team.
