= Nick Pickering =

English footballer

Personal information
- Full name: Nicholas Pickering
- Date of birth: 4 August 1963 (age 63)
- Place of birth: South Shields, England
- Height: 6 ft 0 in (1.83 m)
- Position: Midfielder

Youth career
- 1977–1981: Sunderland

Senior career*
Years	Team	Apps	(Gls)
1981–1986	Sunderland	179	(18)
1986–1988	Coventry City	78	(9)
1988–1991	Derby County	45	(3)
1991–1993	Darlington	57	(7)
1993–1994	Burnley	4	(0)
Total		363	(37)

International career
1982	England Youth	1	(0)
1982–1986	England U21	15	(1)
1983	England	1	(0)
- * Club domestic league appearances and goals

Nicholas Pickering (born 4 August 1963 in South Shields) is a former professional footballer who played as a midfielder in the Football League for Sunderland, Coventry City, Derby County, Darlington and Burnley. He was capped once for the England national team, against Australia in 1983. He was part of the England U21 team that won the 1984 European under-21 championships and reached the semi-final two years later. As a Coventry City player he was on the winning side in the 1987 FA Cup Final.

After retiring as a player he returned to his native north-east, where he was involved in youth coaching and radio work.

In his first season in Sunderland's first team he had the honour of being voted both the club's young player of the year and player of the year by the fans.

== Honours ==
Sunderland

- Football League Cup runner-up: 1984–85

Coventry City

- FA Cup: 1986–87
