= Jimmy Whitehouse (footballer, born 1934) =

English footballer (1934–2022)

Personal information
- Full name: James Whitehouse
- Date of birth: 19 September 1934
- Place of birth: West Bromwich, England
- Date of death: 26 May 2022 (aged 87)
- Position: Inside forward

Youth career
- West Bromwich Albion

Senior career*
Years	Team	Apps	(Gls)
1954–1956	West Bromwich Albion	0	(0)
1956–1962	Reading	203	(61)
1962–1964	Coventry City	46	(12)
1964–1965	Millwall	38	(13)
- Hillingdon Borough
- Hastings United
- Andover
Total		287	(86)
- * Club domestic league appearances and goals

James Whitehouse (19 September 1934 – 26 May 2022) was an English professional footballer who played as an inside forward for West Bromwich Albion, Reading, Coventry City, Millwall, Hillingdon Borough, Hastings United and Andover.
