= Steve Morgan (footballer, born 1968) =

English footballer

Personal information
- Full name: Stephen Morgan
- Date of birth: 19 September 1968 (age 58)
- Place of birth: Oldham, England
- Height: 5 ft 11 in (1.80 m)
- Position: Defender

Senior career*
Years	Team	Apps	(Gls)
1986–1990	Blackpool	144	(10)
1990–1993	Plymouth Argyle	121	(6)
1993–1996	Coventry City	68	(2)
1996	→ Bristol Rovers (loan)	5	(0)
1996–1998	Wigan Athletic	36	(2)
1997	→ Bury (loan)	5	(0)
1998–1999	Burnley	17	(0)
1999–2000	Hull City	19	(1)
2000	Halifax Town	1	(0)
2000–2001	Altrincham		
Total		416	(21)
- * Club domestic league appearances and goals

Stephen Morgan (born 19 September 1968) is an English football coach and former professional footballer.

As a player, he was a defender from 1986 until 2000, notably for Coventry City in the Premier League, and in the Football League with Blackpool, Plymouth Argyle, Bristol Rovers, Wigan Athletic, Bury, Burnley, Hull City and Halifax Town. He finished his career with Non-league Altrincham.

Following his retirement he has worked in youth team coaching and has held roles at Oldham Athletic and Accrington Stanley.

== Playing career ==
Morgan began his career with Blackpool, after progressing through the club's successful youth ranks. He made his first-team debut on 17 March 1986, as a substitute in a 1–1 draw with Bolton Wanderers at Bloomfield Road.

A strong, well-built player, he was comfortable in either a defensive or midfield role, and spent much of his early career deep in defence alongside Dave Burgess or Mike Davies. Fast and skilful, he possessed an accurate cross, often after an overlapping run down the left flank.

Morgan was virtually an ever-present throughout his first three seasons, although his popularity faltered when fans questioned his attitude to the cause. Indeed, his playing style often gave the impression that he was too relaxed, and with the Blackpool struggling in the Third Division, he was often made a scapegoat by supporters.

Towards the end of the 1988–89 season, First Division Wimbledon reportedly offered around £300,000 for him. The cash-strapped Seasiders could have used the money, but Morgan could not agree personal terms with the Londoners. A year later, in July 1990, he joined Second Division Plymouth Argyle for less than one-third of the amount Wimbledon had allegedly offered.

Morgan left Plymouth Argyle to play for Coventry City in the Premier League.

Eventually, Morgan would play for nine clubs, including loan periods at Bristol Rovers and Bury, before bringing his fourteen-year professional career to a close in 2000 with Halifax Town, after playing just one game for the Shaymen.

He joined Altrincham soon after and retired from competitive football at the end of the 2000–01 season.

== Coaching career ==
Morgan took up a coaching role with Oldham Athletic in 2008, coaching their U15 side.

== Honours ==
Wigan Athletic

- Football League Third Division: 1996–97
