= Brian Borrows =

English footballer

Personal information
- Full name: Brian Borrows
- Date of birth: 20 December 1960 (age 65)
- Place of birth: Liverpool, England
- Height: 1.78 m (5 ft 10 in)
- Position: Defender

Senior career*
Years	Team	Apps	(Gls)
1980–1983	Everton	27	(0)
1983–1985	Bolton Wanderers	95	(0)
1985–1997	Coventry City	409	(11)
1993	→ Bristol City (loan)	6	(0)
1997	→ Swindon Town (loan)	12	(0)
1997–1999	Swindon Town	68	(0)
Total		617	(11)

International career
1990	England B	1	(0)
- * Club domestic league appearances and goals

Brian Borrows (born 20 December 1960) is an English football coach and former professional footballer who is a regional coach for the Professional Footballers' Association.

As a player he was a defender from 1980 until 1999, most notably playing in the Premier League for Coventry City, where he made 409 appearances, scoring 11 and winning the FA Cup. Prior to this he had played for both Everton and Bolton Wanderers. He finished playing career in the Football League with Bristol City and Swindon Town.

Following his retirement he had spells as assistant manager of both Coventry City and Derby County.

== Career ==
Brian Borrows was born in Liverpool. He signed for Coventry City from Bolton Wanderers in 1985 and, apart from the rare injury, was the club's regular right back for nearly a decade, missing fewer than 20 games. Borrows was a right back with first class spatial awareness and close ball control.

Far from being a 'workmanlike' full-back, Borrows possessed a great cross and burst of speed which was used to great effect for forwards like Houchen, Speedie and Regis. He was also to play a key defensive role during the 1987 cup run, which included outstanding battling away displays against the likes of Stoke City (5th Round) and Sheffield Wednesday (6th Round). Coventry would later go on to lift the trophy for the first time in their 104-year history against Tottenham Hotspur. Unfortunately for Borrows, he twisted his knee just seven days before the 1987 FA Cup Final, and was forced to miss the game. As a result, his name was chanted many times that afternoon on 16 May 1987 from the Coventry sections of Wembley Stadium. He did however play a part in the Charity Shield showpiece versus Everton later that same year.

He scored several times for Coventry City, mostly from free kicks and the penalty spot. His understanding with Trevor Peake, Brian Kilcline and Steve Ogrizovic formed the basis upon which George Curtis and John Sillett were able to rebuild the club's fortunes after years of underachievement. His playing career spanned some of the great changes in modern British football, from the pre-Sky era of open terracing to the super stadia and media saturation of the Premiership. 'Bugsy' as he was affectionately known at the club, made 474 total appearances scoring a total of 13 goals.

He was voted Coventry City 'Player of the Year' for the 1989/90 season. He also secured a representative honour as an England 'B' cap in 1990.

== Coaching career ==
He spent time coaching the Academy sides of his former club Coventry and Derby County before becoming a Regional Coach for the Professional Footballers' Association in the Midlands area.

== Honours ==
- Coventry City F.C. Hall of Fame
