= John Williams (footballer, born 1968) =

English footballer

Personal information
- Full name: John Nelson Williams
- Date of birth: 11 May 1968 (age 58)
- Place of birth: Birmingham, England
- Height: 6 ft 4 in (1.93 m)
- Position: Forward

Senior career*
Years	Team	Apps	(Gls)
1990–1991	Cradley Town		
1991–1992	Swansea City	39	(11)
1992–1995	Coventry City	80	(11)
1994	→ Notts County (loan)	5	(2)
1994	→ Stoke City (loan)	4	(0)
1995	→ Swansea City (loan)	7	(2)
1995–1997	Wycombe Wanderers	48	(9)
1997	Hereford United	11	(3)
1997	Walsall	1	(0)
1997–1998	Exeter City	36	(4)
1998–1999	Cardiff City	43	(12)
1999–2000	York City	42	(3)
2000–2001	Darlington	24	(5)
2001–2003	Swansea City	68	(5)
2003–2004	Kidderminster Harriers	44	(4)
2005	Bath City		
2005	Redditch United		
2005	Evesham United		
2006	Weston-super-Mare		
2007	Stourbridge		
2007–2008	Willenhall Town		
2008	Boldmere St. Michaels		
Total		452	(71)
- * Club domestic league appearances and goals

John Nelson Williams (born 11 May 1968) is an English former professional footballer who played as a forward from 1990 until 2009.

He notably played in the Premier League for Coventry City. He played in the Football League for Swansea City, Notts County, Stoke City, Wycombe Wanderers, Hereford United, Walsall, Exeter City, Cardiff City, York City, Darlington and Kidderminster Harriers, as well as in Non-league for Cradley Town, Bath City, Redditch United, Evesham United, Weston-super-Mare, Stourbridge, Willenhall Town and Boldmere St. Michaels.

== Playing career ==
Williams started his footballing career at his local club Cradley Town in 1990. After impressing in the lower leagues he attracted the attention of Football League sides and joined Welsh side Swansea City in 1991. After having a decent season with Swansea he move on up to Coventry City the following season. He spent three years with Coventry making 80 league appearances, the most he would acquire in his career. Williams' early goal against Middlesbrough on 15 August 1992 was only the second goal ever scored in the newly formed FA Premiership (the goal came in the ninth minute of the game which was approximately four minutes after Brian Deane's goal against Manchester United on the opening day of the new season), and in his second game he scored both goals in a 2–0 away win against Tottenham Hotspur. Whilst at Coventry Williams had loan spells at Notts County, Stoke City and at his old club Swansea City. He left Coventry in 1995 and joined new league side Wycombe Wanderers to start a somewhat nomadic career. After two years with Wycombe he moved on to unsuccessful spells at Hereford United and Walsall. Williams then went on to have a new club every season starting with Exeter City in the 1997–98 season. He went on to play for Cardiff City, York City, Darlington, two seasons with Swansea City, his third spell at the club and his final Football League side Kidderminster Harriers. Known as the "flying postman" due to his speed and career before football, when playing for Kidderminster he famously scored against Wolverhampton Wanderers in the FA Cup 3rd round only for his goal to be equalised in the final minutes.

Following the end of his professional career Williams has gone on to have a similar nomadic career in non-league football. These clubs are Bath City, Redditch United, Evesham United, Weston-super-Mare, Stourbridge, Willenhall Town and most recently Boldmere St. Michaels. This has taken his total number of clubs to 22.

He joined Willenhall Town managed by Mel Eves, in September 2007. In August 2008, Williams, now aged 40 scored a hat-trick for Boldmere St. Michaels against Shifnal Town.

== Personal life ==
Williams has since worked as a youth and community worker in Birmingham whilst keeping links with the game as an agent with a sports management company. His company 'Flying Postman productions' also produces football themed evening entertainments.

At the 1992 Football League Cup final at Wembley Stadium he claimed the £10,000 first prize when he won the Rumbelows Sprint Contest in a time of 11.49 seconds beating amongst others Leigh Jenkinson and Efan Ekoku.

== Career statistics ==
Appearances and goals by club, season and competition
Club	Season	League			FA Cup		League Cup		Other^{[A]}		Total	
Club	Season	Division	Apps	Goals	Apps	Goals	Apps	Goals	Apps	Goals	Apps	Goals
Swansea City	1991–92	Third Division	39	11	3	0	3	0	1	0	46	11
Coventry City	1992–93	Premier League	41	8	1	0	2	0	0	0	44	8
Coventry City	1993–94	Premier League	32	3	1	0	2	0	0	0	35	3
Coventry City	1994–95	Premier League	7	0	0	0	0	0	0	0	7	0
Coventry City	Total		80	11	2	0	4	0	0	0	86	11
Notts County (loan)	1994–95	First Division	5	2	0	0	0	0	0	0	5	2
Stoke City (loan)	1994–95	First Division	4	0	0	0	0	0	0	0	4	0
Swansea City (loan)	1994–95	Second Division	7	2	0	0	0	0	0	0	7	2
Wycombe Wanderers	1995–96	Second Division	29	8	1	0	2	0	2	0	34	8
Wycombe Wanderers	1996–97	Second Division	19	1	4	4	3	2	0	0	25	7
Wycombe Wanderers	Total		48	9	5	4	3	2	2	0	59	15
Hereford United	1996–97	Third Division	11	3	0	0	0	0	0	0	11	3
Walsall	1997–98	Second Division	1	0	0	0	0	0	0	0	1	0
Exeter City	1997–98	Third Division	36	4	0	0	0	0	0	0	36	4
Cardiff City	1998–99	Third Division	43	12	5	3	2	1	1	0	51	16
York City	1999–2000	Third Division	36	3	1	0	1	0	1	0	39	3
York City	2000–01	Third Division	6	0	0	0	1	0	0	0	7	0
York City	Total		42	3	1	0	2	0	1	0	46	3
Darlington	2000–01	Third Division	24	5	0	0	0	0	1	0	25	5
Swansea City	2001–02	Third Division	41	4	2	1	1	0	1	0	45	5
Swansea City	2002–03	Third Division	27	1	1	0	1	0	0	0	29	1
Swansea City	Total		68	5	3	1	2	0	1	0	74	6
Kidderminster Harriers	2003–04	Third Division	44	4	4	1	1	0	1	0	50	5
Career total			452	71	23	9	19	3	8	0	502	83

A. The "Other" column constitutes appearances and goals in the Football League Trophy.
