= Mick Ferguson =

English footballer (born 1954)

Personal information
- Full name: Michael John Ferguson
- Date of birth: 3 October 1954 (age 72)
- Place of birth: Newcastle upon Tyne, England
- Height: 6 ft 2 in (1.88 m)
- Position: Striker

Youth career
- 1970–1971: Coventry City

Senior career*
Years	Team	Apps	(Gls)
1971–1981	Coventry City	127	(51)
1981–1983	Everton	8	(4)
1982–1983	→ Birmingham City (loan)	20	(8)
1983–1984	Birmingham City	2	(1)
1984	→ Coventry City (loan)	7	(3)
1984–1986	Brighton & Hove Albion	16	(6)
1986–1987	Colchester United	26	(11)
1987–19??	Wealdstone	11	(3)
Total		217	(90)
- * Club domestic league appearances and goals

Michael John Ferguson (born 3 October 1954) is an English former professional footballer who played as a striker. He spent the best years of his playing career at Coventry City. Although his career was plagued by injury, he managed a decent strike-rate at most of the clubs he played for.

== Biography ==
Ferguson was discovered by Coventry City's scouting system, broadened under Jimmy Hill's management to be able to identify young talent anywhere in the country. In his first spell at the club he scored 51 goals in 127 league games over a six-year period. In 1977, he was the top scorer with 13 league goals, but the following season he and Ian Wallace formed a devastating strike partnership scoring 37 league goals between them; Ferguson's share was 17 from 30 games, including three hat-tricks. Ferguson was a key member of what was Coventry's most exciting top-flight team. Playing alongside Ian Wallace, Bobby McDonald, Tommy Hutchison, Terry Yorath and Graham Oakey Ferguson was often unplayable in the air, while surprisingly skilful for such a tall player on the floor. He is one of 30 players selected for Coventry City's Hall of Fame. During this period he was regularly considered for inclusion into the England international squad, though the call-up never came.

After an £750,000 (£500,000 and Martin O'Neill) transfer to Nottingham Forest was cancelled in late 1979 Everton paid £280,000 for him in August 1981, but little more than a year later he moved to Birmingham City, initially on loan. In those months on loan he scored enough goals to be the club's top scorer for the season, but injuries interrupted his career and he played only two more league games for them. He was allowed back to his old club Coventry City on loan in March 1984; the three goals he scored in what remained of that season were enough to save Coventry from relegation from the top flight, ironically at Birmingham's expense. He went on to play for Brighton & Hove Albion, Colchester United and finally non-league Wealdstone. Ferguson retired from playing in 1987, but remained in football, working in community development with several professional clubs. Despite the effects of injury on Ferguson's career, he made more than 200 league appearances (mainly in the top flight), scoring more than 80 league goals.

== Honours ==
- with Coventry City
  - Club's top league scorer 1977.
  - Hall of Fame
- with Birmingham City
  - Club's top league scorer 1982.
