= Andy Pearce =

English footballer

Personal information
- Full name: Andrew Pearce
- Date of birth: 20 April 1966 (age 60)
- Place of birth: Bradford on Avon, England
- Position: Defender

Senior career*
Years	Team	Apps	(Gls)
1989–1990	Halesowen Town	69	(5)
1990–1993	Coventry City	71	(4)
1993–1995	Sheffield Wednesday	66	(3)
1995–1999	Wimbledon	7	(0)
1999–2000	Aldershot Town	8	(0)
Total		221	(12)
- * Club domestic league appearances and goals

Andrew Pearce (born 20 April 1966) is an English former professional footballer who played as a defender.

As a player he notably played in the Premier League for Coventry City, Sheffield Wednesday and Wimbledon, as well as non-league sides Halesowen Town and Aldershot Town

== Playing career ==
He spent his career in England, starting at Halesowen Town, then moved to Coventry City and, after three seasons at Highfield Road moved to Sheffield Wednesday where he achieved cult status following his goal against Sheffield United in a memorable 3–1 victory at Hillsborough. He also helped them reach the semi-finals of the Football League Cup in the 1993-94 season, when they also finished seventh in the FA Premier League.

In November 1995, he moved to Wimbledon for £600,000 but played just seven times for them in the 1995-96 season and was never selected for the first team again after that season, although he remained on the club's payroll for a further three seasons before he was finally given a free transfer. He completed his playing career with a two-year spell in the Isthmian League with Aldershot Town before finally retiring as a player in 2001.
