= Lloyd McGrath =

English footballer

Personal information
- Date of birth: 24 February 1965 (age 61)
- Place of birth: Birmingham, England
- Height: 5 ft 9 in (1.75 m)
- Position: Midfielder

Senior career*
Years	Team	Apps	(Gls)
1982–1994	Coventry City	214	(4)
1994	Sing Tao		
1994–1997	Portsmouth	18	(0)
Total		232	(4)

International career
1982	England Youth	3	(0)
1986	England U21	1	(0)
- * Club domestic league appearances and goals

Lloyd McGrath (born 24 February 1965) is an English retired professional footballer.

A hard-working midfielder, McGrath made his senior debut for Coventry City on 28 April 1984 in one of their heaviest defeats ever - an 8-2 Football League First Division defeat at Southampton. However, three years later he took part in the biggest success of their history so far - the 1987 FA Cup Final triumph over Tottenham Hotspur. He set up the winning goal with a cross that was deflected off the knee of Gary Mabbutt.

By the time of his departure to Hong Kong First Division League side Sing Tao at the end of the 1993-94 season, when the Sky Blues finished 11th in the FA Premier League, he had played 214 league games for the club and scored four goals.

After unsuccessful 3 months in Hong Kong, he played for Portsmouth for the rest of his professional career, retiring in 1997. He now has business interests in the north of Coventry as licensee of the Hawkes Mill Sports and Social Club.

== Honours ==
Coventry City

- FA Cup: 1986–87
