= Trevor Peake =

English footballer and manager

Personal information
- Full name: Trevor Peake
- Date of birth: 10 February 1957 (age 69)
- Place of birth: Nuneaton, England
- Height: 6 ft 0 in (1.83 m)
- Position: Defender

Senior career*
Years	Team	Apps	(Gls)
–1979	Nuneaton Borough		
1979–1983	Lincoln City	171	(7)
1983–1991	Coventry City	277	(6)
1991–1997	Luton Town	179	(0)
Total		627+	(13+)

International career
1979	England semi-pro	2	(0)
- * Club domestic league appearances and goals

Trevor Peake (born 10 February 1957) is an English retired football player and coach. In his playing career he represented Nuneaton Borough, Lincoln City, Luton Town, and Coventry City, with whom he won the 1987 FA Cup. He went into coaching at Luton, which was followed by a spell at Coventry, before spending 17 years in the coaching setup at Leicester City. He retired in 2020.

== Playing career ==
Born in Nuneaton, Peake started his career at hometown club Nuneaton Borough, before joining Lincoln City. Peake was signed by Bobby Gould for Coventry City in 1983 for a fee of £100,000. He formed a central defence pairing with Brian Kilcline that would last for seven seasons. In that time Peake was part of the Coventry team that beat Tottenham Hotspur 3–2 in the 1987 FA Cup Final. He played 277 games for the club, before joining Luton Town in 1991 for a fee of £100,000. He became captain at Luton as they were relegated to Division Two. His last game was in September 1997, making a substitute appearance against Wrexham and in the process, at 40 years 222 days, becoming the Hatters's oldest ever League player.

== Coaching career ==
Peake spent his final season at Luton Town helping coach the reserves before he was asked to return to Coventry City by Gordon Strachan in February 1998. He coached the under-19 side for a season before stepping up to reserve team coach. Coventry sacked their manager Roland Nilsson in April 2002 and appointed Peake, alongside Steve Ogrizovic, as caretaker managers for the club's final game of the season. The club would lose the fixture, 1–0, away to Burnley.

He helped his former Coventry teammate Micky Adams with some scouting work at Leicester City, agreeing a full-time role with their academy in the summer of 2003. Peake was placed in charge of the Under-17 side and as assistant academy director alongside academy director Jon Rudkin. He then took charge of the Under-18 side after Steve Beaglehole was moved up to take charge of the new Under-21 development squad. Peake retired from football in August 2020, and was awarded the Premier League Eamonn Dolan Award, for exceptional contribution to development within the academy environment.

== Honours ==
Lincoln City

- Football League Group Cup runner-up: 1982–83

Coventry City

- FA Cup: 1986–87

Individual

- Coventry City Hall of Fame
