= Graham Oakey =

English footballer

Personal information
- Date of birth: 5 October 1954 (age 72)
- Place of birth: Droitwich, England
- Position: Right back

Youth career
- Coventry City

Senior career*
Years	Team	Apps	(Gls)
1974–1977	Coventry City	88	(0)
Total		88	(0)
- * Club domestic league appearances and goals

Graham Oakey (born 5 October 1954) is an English former footballer who made 88 Football League appearances for Coventry City.

Oakey was a product of Coventry's youth development system. He made his league debut in a home 2-2 draw against Manchester City in September 1974. His career was cut short by a knee injury sustained at Villa Park in December 1977.
