= Steve Ogrizovic =

English football coach and player (born 1957)

Personal information
- Full name: Steven Ogrizovic
- Date of birth: 12 September 1957 (age 69)
- Place of birth: Mansfield, England
- Height: 6 ft 4 in (1.93 m)
- Position: Goalkeeper

Youth career
- 1976–1977: ONRYC

Senior career*
Years	Team	Apps	(Gls)
1977	Chesterfield	16	(0)
1977–1982	Liverpool	4	(0)
1982–1984	Shrewsbury Town	84	(0)
1984–2000	Coventry City	507	(1)
Total		611	(1)

Managerial career
- 2002: Coventry City (caretaker)
- 2004: Coventry City (caretaker)
- Cricket career
Cricket information
- Batting: Right-handed
- Bowling: Right-arm medium-fast
- Role: Bowler
Domestic team information
- Years: Team
- 1983–1984: Shropshire
- 1984: Minor Counties
- LA debut: 29 June 1983 Shropshire v Somerset
- Last LA: 18 July 1984 Shropshire v Warwickshire
Career statistics
Competition	List A
Matches	4
Runs scored	23
Batting average	11.50
100s/50s	0/0
Top score	14
Balls bowled	234
Wickets	5
Bowling average	28.20
5 wickets in innings	0
10 wickets in match	0
Best bowling	2/21
Catches/stumpings	1/–
- Source: CricInfo, 28 November 2020
- * Club domestic league appearances and goals

Steven Ogrizovic (born 12 September 1957) is an English football coach, former professional footballer and cricketer.

As a player, he was a goalkeeper from 1977 until 2000, the last 16 years of which were at Coventry City. Nicknamed "Oggy", he holds the record at Coventry City for the most appearances as a player (601 in all competitions, 507 in the league) and he played in the winning FA Cup team of 1987. He also played for Chesterfield, Liverpool and Shrewsbury Town. Since retiring he remained with the Sky Blues for the next 20 years in a host of different positions including reserve team manager and goalkeeping coach. In both 2002 and 2004 he had spells as caretaker manager of the first team.

Between 1983 and 1984, Ogrizovic played cricket for Shropshire as a right-arm medium-fast bowler. He completed four games for the club, taking five wickets.

== Playing career ==
He started his professional career at Chesterfield before moving to Liverpool. His time at Liverpool was frustrating as he was unable to displace Ray Clemence. He made his debut on 8 March 1978 in a 4–2 defeat at Derby County. He managed a few more team appearances before moving to Shrewsbury Town. In 1984 he joined Coventry for £72,500. He was also selected to play for the Football League vs The Rest of the World at Wembley in 1987.

He was still Coventry's first choice goalkeeper in the 1997–98 season, when at the age of 40 he was the oldest player to play a Premier League game that season. In order to gain his final playing contract Ogrizovic had to give up smoking as one of the conditions. He was the club's second choice goalkeeper for the next two seasons following the arrival of Magnus Hedman, and finally retired at the end of the 1999–2000 season.

In 16 seasons at Coventry, he collected an FA Cup winner's medal, but never played in European competition, as Coventry were unable to compete in the Cup Winner's Cup due to the ban on English teams in European competitions following the Heysel disaster, and the highest position Coventry attained in this period was seventh in the 1988–89 First Division. On no fewer than seven occasions in Ogrizovic's time at the club, they came close to relegation from the top flight. They were finally relegated from the Premier League one season after his retirement.

During his time at Coventry, Ogrizovic scored in a 2–2 draw at Sheffield Wednesday in the First Division on 25 October 1986. He is also one of four players to have played top-flight football in four different decades, along with Peter Shilton, John Lukic and Sir Stanley Matthews and holds the club record of 209 consecutive League appearances for a Coventry City player, from August 1984 to September 1989. Overall, he made 604 professional league appearances in a playing career spanning 23 years from 1977 to 2000.

His final appearance for Coventry came on 6 May 2000 against Sheffield Wednesday. The keeper had not been first choice for much of that season, alternating the number 1 position with Magnus Hedman, but was awarded the jersey for the club's final home game in recognition of his outstanding service to the club.

== International career ==
During the late 1980s and early 1990s, Ogrizovic was generally considered to be the best goalkeeper never to have won a full England cap. However, he did come on as a second-half substitute for Peter Shilton, in the English Football League XI vs Rest of the World XI in 1987. This match was to start the English football league celebrations, and was hosted at Wembley stadium. Ogrizovic played for 45 minutes. Although frequently considered for selection during this period by a number of England managers including Bobby Robson and Graham Taylor, he was never selected for the full squad. He was once considered to be selected for the Yugoslavian national side (due to his Yugoslavian parentage), in the late eighties, but he declined the offer.

== Coaching career ==
Ogrizovic was caretaker manager in conjunction with Trevor Peake at the end of the 2001–02 season, between Roland Nilsson's departure and Gary McAllister's appointment, and for a couple of days towards the end of the 2003–04 season. During Iain Dowie's spell as manager, Ogrizovic was the manager of the Coventry City reserve team, and he continued to hold this role under Chris Coleman. He was Coventry City's goalkeeping coach from 2008 to 2019.

== Personal life ==
Ogrizovic is the son of Nikola Ogrizović (Serbian Cyrillic: Никола Огризовић), a Yugoslav (Serb) prisoner of war in Italy during World War II, who sought refuge in the United Kingdom after being liberated by British troops. Ogrizovic served both as a Police Cadet and as a Police Officer at Mansfield Police Station in Nottinghamshire prior to signing as a professional footballer. In 2003 Ogrizovic was the subject of a hoax that said that he had been kidnapped in Kazakhstan and an online petition was set up to campaign to get him released. This was proved to be false when the Coventry Evening Telegraph interviewed him at Coventry City's training ground at Ryton-on-Dunsmore.

== Cricket career ==
Ogrizovic was also a cricketer, reaching Minor Counties level as a medium-fast bowler. He played three List A matches for Shropshire County Cricket Club in the NatWest Trophy, and a further game for Minor Counties in the Benson & Hedges Cup. Amongst the players who he got out at this level were Chris Broad, Martyn Moxon and Alvin Kallicharran, all international cricketers

== Honours ==
=== As a player ===
Liverpool

- FA Charity Shield: 1979, 1980
- European Cup: 1977–78, 1980–81

Coventry City

- FA Cup: 1986–87

Individual

- Coventry City Hall of Fame
