= 1990–91 Coventry City F.C. season =

Football team season

Coventry City
1990–91 season
- Chairman: John Poynton
- Manager: John Sillett (until 14 November); Terry Butcher (from 14 November)
- Stadium: Highfield Road
- First Division: 16th
- FA Cup: Fourth round
- League Cup: Quarter finals
- Full Members Cup: Second round (Northern Area)
- Player of the Year: Kevin Gallacher
- Top goalscorer: League: Gallacher (11); All: Gallacher (16)
- Highest home attendance: 22,731 vs Tottenham Hotspur (26 Dec 1990, First Division)
- Lowest home attendance: 6,193 vs Bolton Wanderers >(26 Sep 1990, League Cup)
- Average home league attendance: 13,794
Home colours

The 1990–91 season was Coventry City's 24th consecutive campaign in the Football League First Division, following their promotion from the Second Division in 1967. The club started the season with John Sillett in charge, three years after he and George Curtis had managed the club to victory in the 1986–87 FA Cup. Sillett left the club in November after a run of poor results, and was replaced by Terry Butcher who arrived as a player-manager from Rangers.

Coventry's league form in the season was a contrast between a solid home record and poor away form, as they recorded only one win away from Highfield Road. In the FA Cup they suffered a defeat to Southampton in the fourth round, but the highlight of the season was their run in the League Cup. They beat holders Nottingham Forest 5–4 in the fourth round, before losing to Sheffield Wednesday in the quarter-final.

== Background ==
The 1990–91 season was Coventry City's 24th consecutive campaign in the Football League First Division, following their promotion from the Second Division in 1967. The club had achieved its first major trophy a few seasons earlier, with victory in the 1986–87 FA Cup Final under the joint management of George Curtis and John Sillett, and Sillett remained manager at the beginning of 1990–91. Their league form in the seasons following the cup win was solid with tenth, seventh, and twelfth-place finishes, although the 1989–90 season finished disappointingly as they won just one of their final nine games. They failed to defend the FA Cup in 1987–88, exiting in the fourth round, and they suffered one of the biggest upsets in FA Cup history in 1989–90, as they lost 2–1 to non-league Sutton United in the third round. They suffered another embarrassing FA Cup defeat the following season, this time to Third Division Northampton, but fared better in the League Cup, reaching the semi-final with a 5–0 win over Sunderland before losing to eventual winners Nottingham Forest in the semi-final.

Sillett did not buy or sell very heavily in the summer of 1990, before the start of the season. Supporters were calling for a strong midfield player to be bought to bolster the team, but defender Andy Pearce was the only major signing, bought from Halesowen Town for £15,000. Greg Downs, who had been part of the Cup winning squad, moved to Birmingham City on a free transfer. Despite this lack of transfer activity and the poor finish to the previous season, Sillett was optimistic that the club could challenge for a top six finish or even the league title.

== Season summary ==
=== Football League First Division ===
The season started poorly, with a win against a struggling Everton side the only highlight of the opening games. Under pressure to change something, and with regulars Dean Emerson and Lloyd McGrath injured, Sillett signed players from Europe to add depth to the team. Winger Zoltán Csucsánszky came from Hungary for a trial, but sustained an injury in his first game, a friendly. Uruguayan José Perdomo had more success, arriving on loan from Genoa and impressing Sillett in six games for Coventry. The club were unable to sign him permanently, however.

Results did not improve significantly as the autumn progressed, and morale was poor. Star striker David Speedie was dropped from the team after a run of poor performances, and by November the club were in sixteenth position. In November, the club announced that Sillett was leaving his post as manager. Historians do not know if he resigned or was sacked, although he was not working due to sickness at the time and had been planning to leave at the end of the season anyway. The club appointed Terry Butcher as Sillett's replacement. Butcher was still an active player for Rangers at the time, and had been captain of the England team during their World Cup semi-final against West Germany in the summer, so he arrived as player–manager and the club had to pay a transfer fee of up to £450,000 for him. His first game, at home to Liverpool, ended in a defeat.

Despite success in the League Cup, Butcher had to wait more than a month before the club won a league game under his management and supporters feared that the club would be dragged into a relegation battle. Butcher bought Ray Woods from Wigan Athletic, but was forced to sell the promising young players Steve Livingstone and Tony Dobson, who both left for Blackburn Rovers. Speedie was also sold, moving to Liverpool for £675,000, following a series of sub-par performances and a poor relationship with Butcher. Butcher then signed Kenny Sansom and Stewart Robson, and the club began to record some better results, recording home wins against Aston Villa, Manchester City and Chelsea, amongst others. By mid-April, with three games remaining, Coventry had moved up to ninth place in the table, but two defeats from their last three games, including a 6–1 defeat at champions Arsenal in the final game, saw them finish in sixteenth.

The league season had been a contrast between excellent form at Highfield Road, where the side won ten of nineteen games and were unbeaten after the November defeat to Liverpool, and a poor away record with just one win, at Sheffield United early in the season. The player of the year was Kevin Gallacher, who scored eleven league goals. As a player, Terry Butcher had only started seven games, six in the league, as a result of injury. Cyrille Regis played well throughout the season, but did not score heavily and was released by Coventry at the end of the season, moving to rivals Aston Villa F.C.

=== FA Cup ===
Following defeats to lower-division and non-league opposition in the previous two seasons, Coventry faced the possibility of another upset in the third round against Wigan Athletic. Wigan had some future top-flight players in their team including Peter Atherton, who later signed for Coventry, but were having a poor season, being in seventeenth place in Division Three. The first match, played at Highfield Road on 5 January 1991, ended in a 1–1 draw as Micky Gynn's opener in the 66th minute was cancelled out by a last minute equaliser by Wigan's Darren Patterson. The replay at Springfield Park was four days later and was won 1–0 by Coventry courtesy of another Gynn goal.

In the fourth round in late January, a few days after their defeat in the League Cup quarter final, City again drew 1–1 at home against Southampton with Alan Shearer equalising after Brian Kilcline's opener. In the replay at The Dell City had eight players out through injury, and lost Steve Ogrizovic after 24 minutes. Southampton went on to win 2–0.

=== Football League Cup ===
After reaching the semi-final in the 1989–90 season, Coventry again performed well in the 1990–91 Football League Cup, also known as the Rumbelow's Cup. The campaign began in September with a two-legged second-round tie against Bolton Wanderers, in which City won both their home and away games by scores of 4–2 and 3–2 respectively. In the third round, on 31 October, they played at home to Hull City. The visitors dominated the first half but were unable to score, and then suffered the set-back of losing former Coventry player Dave Bamber. Coventry improved after half-time, and won the game 3–0 with goals from Speedie, Livingstone and Regis.

In the fourth round on 28 November, Coventry faced Nottingham Forest, in Butcher's third match as manager. Forest had won the tournament in both of the previous two seasons, beating City on each occasion, and started the match as favourites. After 35 minutes, Coventry had moved into a 4–0 lead with Gallacher claiming a hat-trick and Steve Livingstone also scoring. Forest responded, however, and Nigel Clough, son of manager Brian Clough, stunned Highfield Road with a hat-trick of his own, scored in just seven minutes and leaving the score 4–3 at half time. Forest levelled the match through a Garry Parker goal after half-time, but Livingstone's goal with half an hour remaining won the game for Coventry by a 5–4 scoreline.

City had to wait almost two months for their next match in the competition, the quarter-final tie at home to Sheffield Wednesday of the Second Division. Coventry created few chances in the game, with player-manager Terry Butcher sustaining an injury as well, and Nigel Pearson's 9th-minute goal was enough to win the tie for Sheffield Wednesday.

== Final league table ==
| Pos | Team | Pld | W | D | L | GF | GA | GD | Pts |
|---|---|---|---|---|---|---|---|---|---|
| 14 | Southampton | 38 | 12 | 9 | 17 | 58 | 69 | −11 | 45 |
| 15 | Norwich City | 38 | 13 | 6 | 19 | 41 | 64 | −23 | 45 |
| 16 | Coventry City | 38 | 11 | 11 | 16 | 42 | 49 | −7 | 44 |
| 17 | Aston Villa | 38 | 9 | 14 | 15 | 46 | 58 | −12 | 41 |
| 18 | Luton Town | 38 | 10 | 7 | 21 | 42 | 61 | −19 | 37 |

Source: World Football
Rules for classification: 1) Points; 2) Goal difference; 3) Goals scored

Results summary

| Overall | | | | | | | | Home | | | | | | Away | | | | | |
| Pld | W | D | L | GF | GA | GD | Pts | W | D | L | GF | GA | GD | W | D | L | GF | GA | GD |
|---|---|---|---|---|---|---|---|---|---|---|---|---|---|---|---|---|---|---|---|
| 38 | 11 | 11 | 16 | 42 | 49 | −7 | 44 | 10 | 6 | 3 | 30 | 16 | +14 | 1 | 5 | 13 | 12 | 33 | −21 |

Source: "Coventry City 1990-1991". Statto.com. Archived from the original on 4 March 2016.

Results by round

| Round | 1 | 2 | 3 | 4 | 5 | 6 | 7 | 8 | 9 | 10 | 11 | 12 | 13 | 14 | 15 | 16 | 17 | 18 | 19 | 20 | 21 | 22 | 23 | 24 | 25 | 26 | 27 | 28 | 29 | 30 | 31 | 32 | 33 | 34 | 35 | 36 | 37 | 38 |
|---|---|---|---|---|---|---|---|---|---|---|---|---|---|---|---|---|---|---|---|---|---|---|---|---|---|---|---|---|---|---|---|---|---|---|---|---|---|---|
| Ground | A | H | H | A | H | A | H | A | H | A | H | A | H | H | A | A | H | A | H | H | A | A | H | A | H | H | A | H | A | H | A | H | A | A | H | A | H | A |
| Result | L | W | D | L | D | L | W | L | L | W | L | D | L | D | L | L | D | L | W | W | D | L | W | L | D | W | L | W | L | W | D | W | D | D | W | L | D | L |
| Position | 19 | 8 | 7 | 11 | 15 | 17 | 12 | 14 | 16 | 12 | 16 | 14 | 15 | 16 | 17 | 18 | 18 | 18 | 16 | 16 | 16 | 16 | 15 | 15 | 16 | 16 | 17 | 14 | 16 | 15 | 15 | 12 | 11 | 11 | 9 | 14 | 14 | 16 |

Source: "Coventry City results for the 1990-1991 season". Statto.com. Archived from the original on 4 March 2016.
A = Away; H = Home; W = Win; D = Draw; L = Loss

== Results ==
Coventry City's score comes first

=== Legend ===
| Win | Draw | Loss |

=== Football League First Division ===
| Date | Opponent | Venue | Result | Attendance | Scorers |
|---|---|---|---|---|---|
| 25 August 1990 | Manchester United | A | 0–2 | 46,715 | |
| 29 August 1990 | Everton | H | 3–1 | 12,902 | Dobson, Gallacher, Speedie |
| 1 September 1990 | Nottingham Forest | H | 2–2 | 12,630 | Borrows (pen), Kilcline (pen) |
| 8 September 1990 | Aston Villa | A | 1–2 | 27,001 | Borrows |
| 15 September 1990 | Wimbledon | H | 0–0 | 8,925 | |
| 22 September 1990 | Luton Town | A | 0–1 | 8,336 | |
| 29 September 1990 | Queens Park Rangers | H | 3–1 | 9,897 | Livingstone (2), Gynn |
| 6 October 1990 | Manchester City | A | 0–2 | 26,198 | |
| 20 October 1990 | Southampton | H | 1–2 | 10,040 | Borrows (pen) |
| 27 October 1990 | Sheffield United | A | 1–0 | 17,978 | Borrows (pen) |
| 3 November 1990 | Arsenal | H | 0–2 | 15,336 | |
| 10 November 1990 | Sunderland | A | 0–0 | 20,101 | |
| 17 November 1990 | Liverpool | H | 0–1 | 22,571 | |
| 24 November 1990 | Leeds United | H | 1–1 | 16,183 | Gallacher |
| 1 December 1990 | Crystal Palace | A | 1–2 | 17,052 | Regis |
| 8 December 1990 | Everton | A | 0–1 | 17,472 | |
| 15 December 1990 | Manchester United | H | 2–2 | 17,106 | Regis, Gallacher |
| 22 December 1990 | Chelsea | A | 1–2 | 16,317 | Gallacher |
| 26 December 1990 | Tottenham Hotspur | H | 2–0 | 22,731 | Gynn, Gallacher |
| 29 December 1990 | Norwich City | H | 2–0 | 12,039 | Borrows (pen), Speedie |
| 1 January 1991 | Derby County | A | 1–1 | 15,741 | Regis |
| 12 January 1991 | Nottingham Forest | A | 0–3 | 18,344 | |
| 19 January 1991 | Aston Villa | H | 2–1 | 15,751 | Gynn, Speedie |
| 2 February 1991 | Wimbledon | A | 0–1 | 4,061 | |
| 23 February 1991 | Sunderland | H | 0–0 | 10,453 | |
| 2 March 1991 | Crystal Palace | H | 3–1 | 10,891 | Kilcline (2), Peake |
| 9 March 1991 | Leeds United | A | 0–2 | 28,880 | |
| 13 March 1991 | Luton Town | H | 2–1 | 9,725 | Borrows (pen), Pearce |
| 16 March 1991 | Queens Park Rangers | A | 0–1 | 9,510 | |
| 23 March 1991 | Manchester City | H | 3–1 | 13,198 | Regis, Gynn, Gallacher |
| 30 March 1991 | Tottenham Hotspur | A | 2–2 | 29,033 | Smith, Gallacher |
| 1 April 1991 | Chelsea | H | 1–0 | 14,272 | Gynn |
| 6 April 1991 | Norwich City | A | 2–2 | 11,550 | Gynn, Gallacher |
| 9 April 1991 | Liverpool | A | 1–1 | 31,063 | Gynn |
| 13 April 1991 | Derby County | H | 3–0 | 11,961 | Gallacher (2), Woods |
| 20 April 1991 | Southampton | A | 1–2 | 15,461 | Gynn |
| 4 May 1991 | Sheffield United | H | 0–0 | 17,254 | |
| 11 May 1991 | Arsenal | A | 1–6 | 41,039 | Gallacher |

=== FA Cup ===
| Round | Date | Opponent | Venue | Result | Attendance | Goalscorers |
|---|---|---|---|---|---|---|
| R3 | 5 January 1991 | Wigan Athletic | H | 1–1 | 10,802 | Gynn |
| R3R | 9 January 1991 | Wigan Athletic | A | 1–0 | 7,429 | Gynn |
| R4 | 26 January 1991 | Southampton | H | 1–1 | 14,013 | Kilcline |
| R4R | 29 January 1991 | Southampton | A | 0–2 | 17,001 | |

=== League Cup ===
| Round | Date | Opponent | Venue | Result | Attendance | Goalscorers |
|---|---|---|---|---|---|---|
| R2 1st Leg | 26 September 1990 | Bolton Wanderers | H | 4–2 | 6,193 | Livingstone (2), Gynn, Gallacher |
| R2 2nd Leg | 9 October 1990 | Bolton Wanderers | A | 3–2 (won 7–4 on agg) | 5,222 | Regis (2), Gallacher |
| R3 | 31 October 1990 | Hull City | H | 3–0 | 7,708 | Regis, Livingstone, Speedie |
| R4 | 28 November 1990 | Nottingham Forest | H | 5–4 | 16,304 | Livingstone (2), Gallacher (3) |
| QF | 23 January 1991 | Sheffield Wednesday | H | 0–1 | 20,712 | |

=== Full Members Cup ===
| Round | Date | Opponent | Venue | Result | Attendance | Goalscorers |
|---|---|---|---|---|---|---|
| NR2 | 19 December 1990 | Derby County | A | 0–1 | 7,270 | |

== Players ==
=== First-team squad ===
Note: Flags indicate national team as defined under FIFA eligibility rules; some limited exceptions apply. Players may hold more than one non-FIFA nationality.

| Pos. | Nation | Player |
|---|---|---|
| GK | ENG | Tim Clarke |
| GK | ENG | Steve Ogrizovic |
| GK | ENG | Steve Sutton (on loan from Nottingham Forest) |
| GK | ENG | Keith Waugh |
| DF | ENG | Peter Billing |
| DF | ENG | Martyn Booty |
| DF | ENG | Brian Borrows |
| DF | ENG | Terry Butcher (Note: Butcher was born in Singapore, but was raised in England and represented England at U-21 level before making his international debut for England in May 1980.) (player-manager) |
| DF | ENG | Tony Dobson |
| DF | ENG | Paul Edwards |
| DF | ENG | Brian Kilcline |
| DF | ENG | Trevor Peake |
| DF | ENG | Andy Pearce |
| DF | ENG | Kenny Sansom |
| DF | ENG | David Titterton |
| MF | ENG | Howard Clark |
| MF | ENG | Dean Emerson |

| Pos. | Nation | Player |
|---|---|---|
| MF | ENG | Terry Fleming |
| MF | ENG | Micky Gynn |
| MF | ENG | Lee Hurst |
| MF | SCO | Kevin MacDonald |
| MF | ENG | Lloyd McGrath |
| MF | ENG | Craig Middleton |
| MF | URU | José Perdomo |
| MF | ENG | Stewart Robson |
| MF | ENG | David Smith |
| MF | ENG | Keith Thompson |
| MF | ENG | Ray Woods |
| FW | ENG | Kevin Drinkell |
| FW | SCO | Kevin Gallacher |
| FW | ENG | Steve Livingstone |
| FW | ENG | Cyrille Regis (Note: Regis was born in Maripasoula, French Guiana, but was raised in England from the age of 4 and represented England at U-21 and B level before making his international debut for England in February 1982.) |
| FW | ENG | Robert Rosario |
| FW | SCO | David Speedie |

== Transfers ==
=== In ===
| Date | Pos | Name | From | Fee |
|---|---|---|---|---|
| 22 October 1990 | GK | (England) Tim Clarke | (England) Halesowen Town | £25,000 |
| 30 January 1991 | FW | (England) Ray Woods | (England) Wigan Athletic | £200,000 |

=== Out ===
| Date | Pos | Name | To | Fee |
|---|---|---|---|---|
| 1 July 1990 | GK | (England) Dean Kiely (Note: Kiely was born in Salford, England, and represented England at U-15, U-16, and U-18 level, but also qualified to represent the Republic of Ireland internationally and represented the Republic of Ireland at B level before making his international debut for the Republic of Ireland in November 1999.) | (England) York City | Signed |
| 3 August 1990 | DF | (England) Greg Downs | (England) Birmingham City | Transfer |
| 17 January 1991 | FW | (England) Steve Livingstone | (England) Blackburn Rovers | £450,000 |
| 17 January 1991 | DF | (England) Tony Dobson | (England) Blackburn Rovers | £300,000 |
| January 1991 | FW | (Scotland) David Speedie | (England) Liverpool | £650,000 |

Transfers in: ▼£225,000
Transfers out: ▲£750,000
Total spending: ▲£525,000

== Sources ==
- Brassington, David (1989). Singers to Sky Blues: The story of Coventry City Football Club (2 ed.). Buckingham: Sporting and Leisure Press Limited. ISBN 9780860234524.
- Brown, Jim (1998). Coventry City: The Elite Era : a Complete Record. Westcliff-on-Sea: Desert Island Books. ISBN 9781874287032.
