= 1989–90 Coventry City F.C. season =

Coventry City F.C.
1989–90 season
- Manager: John Sillett
- Football League First Division: 12th
- FA Cup: Third round
- League Cup: Semi-final
- Full Members' Cup: Southern Section First Round

This article documents the 1989–90 season of football club Coventry City F.C.

== League table ==
Pos	Team	Pld	W	D	L	GF	GA	GD	Pts	Qualification or relegation
10	Norwich City	38	13	14	11	44	42	+2	53	
11	Queens Park Rangers	38	13	11	14	45	44	+1	50	
12	Coventry City	38	14	7	17	39	59	−20	49	
13	Manchester United	38	13	9	16	46	47	−1	48	Qualification for the European Cup Winners' Cup first round (Note: Manchester United qualified for the UEFA Cup Winners' Cup as the 1989–90 FA Cup winners.)
14	Manchester City	38	12	12	14	43	52	−9	48	

Source: World Football
Rules for classification: 1) Points; 2) Goal difference; 3) Goals scored

== Results ==
=== First Division ===
19 August 1989 1	Coventry City	2–0	Everton	Coventry
	Bannister 67'; Speedie 90'			Stadium: Highfield Road; Attendance: 17,981

22 August 1989 2	Arsenal	2–0	Coventry City	London
	Marwood 50'; Thomas 84'			Stadium: Highbury; Attendance: 33,886

26 August 1989 3	Crystal Palace	0–1	Coventry City	London
			Kilcline	Stadium: Selhurst Park; Attendance: 11,122

30 August 1989 4	Coventry City	2–1	Manchester City	Coventry
	Smith; Gynn		White	Stadium: Highfield Road; Attendance: 16,111

9 September 1989 5	Millwall	4–1	Coventry City	London
	Sheringham x 2 Anthrobus; Dawes		Smith	Stadium: The Den; Attendance: 12,062

16 September 1989 6	Coventry City	1–0	Luton Town	Coventry
	Bannister			Stadium: Highfield Road; Attendance: 11,207

23 September 1989 7	Chelsea	1–0	Coventry City	London
	Wilson			Stadium: Stamford Bridge; Attendance: 18,248

30 September 1989 8	Sheffield Wednesday	0–0	Coventry City	Sheffield
				Stadium: Hillsborough; Attendance: 15,054

14 October 1989 9	Coventry City	0–2	Nottingham Forest	Coventry
			Crosby; Rice	Stadium: Highfield Road; Attendance: 15,722

21 October 1989 10	Coventry City	1–4	Manchester United	Coventry
	Drinkell		Bruce; Phelan; Hughes x 2	Stadium: Highfield Road; Attendance: 19,605

28 October 1989 11	Charlton Athletic	1–1	Coventry City	London
	Mortimer		Speedie	Stadium: Selhurst Park; Attendance: 6,149

4 November 1989 12	Liverpool	0–1	Coventry City	Liverpool
			Regis	Stadium: Anfield; Attendance: 36,443

11 November 1989 13	Coventry City	1–0	Southampton	Coventry
	Drinkell			Stadium: Highfield Road; Attendance: 12,151

18 November 1989 14	Aston Villa	4–1	Coventry City	Birmingham
	Ormondroyd x 2 Platt (pen); Peake		Gynn	Stadium: Villa Park; Attendance: 22,803

25 November 1989 15	Coventry City	1–0	Norwich City	Coventry
	Regis			Stadium: Highfield Road; Attendance: 11,999

2 December 1989 16	Everton	2–0	Coventry City	Liverpool
	McCall; Watson			Stadium: Goodison Park; Attendance: 21,171

9 December 1989 17	Coventry City	0–1	Arsenal	Coventry
			Merson	Stadium: Highfield Road; Attendance: 16,255

16 December 1989 18	Coventry City	2–1	Wimbledon	Coventry
	Borrows; Curle o.g.		Young	Stadium: Highfield Road; Attendance: 8,308

26 December 1989 19	Queens Park Rangers	1–1	Coventry City	London
	Falco		Speedie	Stadium: Loftus Road; Attendance: 9,889

30 December 1989 20	Derby County	4–1	Coventry City	Derby
	Hebberd x2 Pickering; Ramage		Speedie	Stadium: Baseball Ground; Attendance: 17,011

1 January 1990 21	Coventry City	0–0	Tottenham Hotspur	Coventry
				Stadium: Highfield Road; Attendance: 19,559

13 January 1990 22	Coventry City	1–0	Crystal Palace	Coventry
	Speedie			Stadium: Highfield Road; Attendance: 10,858

20 January 1990 23	Manchester City	1–0	Coventry City	Manchester
	White			Stadium: Maine Road; Attendance: 24,345

3 February 1990 24	Coventry City	3–2	Chelsea	Coventry
	McAllister o.g. Regis; Livingstone		Dixon; Dorigo	Stadium: Highfield Road; Attendance: 15,243

17 February 1990 25	Coventry City	3–1	Millwall	Coventry
	Smith; Livingstone x2		Cascarino	Stadium: Highfield Road; Attendance: 10,981

4 March 1990 26	Coventry City	2–0	Aston Villa	Coventry
	Drinkell; Smith			Stadium: Highfield Road; Attendance: 17,891

7 March 1990 27	Luton Town	3–2	Coventry City	Luton
	Black; Gray; Dowie		Drinkell; Regis	Stadium: Kenilworth Road; Attendance: 8,244

10 March 1990 28	Nottingham Forest	2–4	Coventry City	Nottingham
	Currie; Laws		Drinkell; Gallacher; Speedie x2	Stadium: City Ground; Attendance: 18,750

14 March 1990 29	Norwich City	0–0	Coventry City	Norwich
				Stadium: Carrow Road; Attendance: 13,673

17 March 1990 30	Coventry City	1–4	Sheffield Wednesday	Coventry
	Gynn		Hirst; Worthington; Sheridan; Atkinson	Stadium: Highfield Road; Attendance: 13,339

24 March 1990 31	Coventry City	1–2	Charlton Athletic	Coventry
	Gallacher		Minto; Drinkell o.g.	Stadium: Highfield Road; Attendance: 9,997

31 March 1990 32	Manchester United	3–0	Coventry City	Manchester
	Hughes x2 Robins			Stadium: Old Trafford; Attendance: 39,172

7 April 1990 33	Coventry City	1–0	Derby County	Coventry
	Wright o.g.			Stadium: Highfield Road; Attendance: 11,157

14 April 1990 34	Tottenham Hotspur	3–2	Coventry City	London
	Stewart; Lineker x2		Smith; Speedie	Stadium: White Hart Lane; Attendance: 23,917

16 April 1990 35	Coventry City	1–1	Queens Park Rangers	Coventry
	Smith		Maddix	Stadium: Highfield Road; Attendance: 10,039

21 April 1990 36	Wimbledon	0–0	Coventry City	London
				Stadium: Plough Lane; Attendance: 4,086

28 April 1990 37	Southampton	3–0	Coventry City	Southampton
	Le Tissier (pen); Horne; Osman			Stadium: The Dell; Attendance: 16,359

5 May 1990 38	Coventry City	1–6	Liverpool	Coventry
	Gallacher 2'		Rush 16'; Barnes 37', 39', 61'; Rosenthal 50', 69'	Stadium: Highfield Road; Attendance: 23,204

=== FA Cup ===
6 January 1990 Round 3	Northampton Town	1–0	Coventry City	Northampton
				Stadium: County Ground; Attendance: 11,648

=== League Cup ===
19 September 1989 Round 2 Leg 1	Grimsby Town	3–1	Coventry City	Cleethorpes
				Stadium: Blundell Park; Attendance: 10,150

4 October 1989 Round 2 Leg 2	Coventry City	3–0 (4–3 agg.)	Grimsby Town	Coventry
				Stadium: Highfield Road; Attendance: 15,327

25 October 1989 Round 3	Queens Park Rangers	1–2	Coventry City	London
				Stadium: Loftus Road; Attendance: 9,277

22 November 1989 Round 4	Manchester City	0–1	Coventry City	Manchester
			Regis	Stadium: Maine Road; Attendance: 23,355

17 January 1990 Quarter Final	Sunderland	0–0	Coventry City	Sunderland
				Stadium: Roker Park; Attendance: 27,218

24 January 1990 Quarter Final Replay	Coventry City	5–0	Sunderland	Coventry
	Livingstone (4); Gynn			Stadium: Highfield Road; Attendance: 21,219

11 February 1990 Semi Final First Leg	Nottingham Forest	2–1	Coventry City	Nottingham
	Clough (pen); Pearce		Livingstone	Stadium: City Ground; Attendance: 26,153

25 February 1990 Semi Final Second Leg	Coventry City	0–0 (1–2 agg.)	Nottingham Forest	Coventry
				Stadium: Highfield Road; Attendance: 25,900

=== Football League Trophy ===
29 November 1989 Southern Section Round 1	Coventry City	1–3 (a.e.t.)	Wimbledon	Coventry
				Stadium: Highfield Road; Attendance: 3,781

== Squad ==
Note: Flags indicate national team as defined under FIFA eligibility rules; some limited exceptions apply. Players may hold more than one non-FIFA nationality.

Pos.	Nation	Player
GK	ENG	Steve Ogrizovic
GK	ENG	Keith Waugh
GK	IRL	Dean Kiely
DF	ENG	Peter Billing
DF	ENG	Brian Borrows
DF	ENG	Brian Kilcline
DF	ENG	Trevor Peake
DF	ENG	Tony Dobson
DF	ENG	Martyn Booty
DF	ENG	Greg Downs
DF	ENG	Paul Edwards
DF	ENG	David Titterton
MF	ENG	Howard Clark
MF	ENG	Dean Emerson

Pos.	Nation	Player
MF	SCO	Kevin MacDonald
MF	ENG	Micky Gynn
MF	ENG	Lloyd McGrath
MF	SCO	Dougie McGuire
MF	ENG	Lee Middleton
MF	ENG	David Smith
MF	ENG	Keith Thompson
FW	ENG	Gary Bannister
FW	ENG	Kevin Drinkell
FW	SCO	Kevin Gallacher
FW	ENG	Cyrille Regis
FW	SCO	David Speedie
FW	ENG	Steve Livingstone
