= 1988–89 Coventry City F.C. season =

Coventry City
1988–89 season
- Manager: John Sillett
- Stadium: Highfield Road
- First Division: 7th
- FA Cup: Third round
- League Cup: Third round
- Full Members' Cup: Third round

This article documents the 1988–89 season of football club Coventry City F.C.

== League table ==
Pos	Team	Pld	W	D	L	GF	GA	GD	Pts
5	Derby County	38	17	7	14	40	38	+2	58
6	Tottenham Hotspur	38	15	12	11	60	46	+14	57
7	Coventry City	38	14	13	11	47	42	+5	55
8	Everton	38	14	12	12	50	45	+5	54
9	Queens Park Rangers	38	14	11	13	43	37	+6	53

Source: World Football
Rules for classification: 1) Points; 2) Goal difference; 3) Goals scored

== Results ==
=== First Division ===
3 September 1988 1	Coventry City	0–1	Everton	Coventry
			Cottee	Stadium: Highfield Road; Attendance: 18,625

10 September 1988 2	Sheffield Wednesday	1–2	Coventry City	Sheffield
			Regis; Speedie	Stadium: Hillsborough; Attendance: 15,635

17 September 1988 3	Coventry City	3–0	Charlton Athletic	Coventry
	Bannister; Smith 2x			Stadium: Highfield Road; Attendance: 11,890

24 September 1988 4	Wimbledon	0–1	Coventry City	London
			Bannister	Stadium: Plough Lane; Attendance: 4,474

1 October 1988 5	Coventry City	3–4	Middlesbrough	Coventry
	Speedie 3x		Burke; Slaven 3x	Stadium: Highfield Road; Attendance: 14,527

8 October 1988 6	Newcastle United	0–3	Coventry City	Newcastle Upon Tyne
			Regis; Gynn; Speedie	Stadium: St James' Park; Attendance: 22,890

15 October 1988 7	Coventry City	0–0	Millwall	Coventry
				Stadium: Highfield Road; Attendance: 19,369

22 October 1988 8	Liverpool	0–0	Coventry City	Liverpool
				Stadium: Anfield; Attendance: 38,742

29 October 1988 9	Arsenal	2–0	Coventry City	London
	Adams; Thomas			Stadium: Highbury; Attendance: 31,273

5 November 1988 10	Coventry City	1–1	West Ham United	Coventry
	Thompson		Kelly	Stadium: Highfield Road; Attendance: 14,651

12 November 1988 11	Coventry City	1–0	Luton Town	Coventry
	Rodger			Stadium: Highfield Road; Attendance: 12,625

19 November 1988 12	Nottingham Forest	0–0	Coventry City	Nottingham
				Stadium: City Ground; Attendance: 17,250

23 November 1988 13	Tottenham Hotspur	1–1	Coventry City	London
	Stewart		Houchen	Stadium: White Hart Lane; Attendance: 21,961

26 November 1988 14	Coventry City	2–1	Aston Villa	Coventry
	Houchen; Regis		McInally	Stadium: Highfield Road; Attendance: 20,104

3 December 1988 15	Queens Park Rangers	2–1	Coventry City	London
			Speedie	Stadium: Loftus Road; Attendance: 9,853

10 December 1988 16	Coventry City	1–0	Manchester United	Coventry
	Regis			Stadium: Highfield Road; Attendance: 19,936

17 December 1988 17	Coventry City	0–2	Derby County	Coventry
			McMinn; Saunders	Stadium: Highfield Road; Attendance: 17,229

26 December 1988 18	Southampton	2–2	Coventry City	Southampton
	Moore; R. Wallace		Bannister; Phillips	Stadium: The Dell; Attendance: 16,008

31 December 1988 19	Everton	3–1	Coventry City	Liverpool
	Bracewell; Sheedy 2x		Bannister	Stadium: Goodison Park; Attendance: 30,790

2 January 1989 20	Coventry City	5–0	Sheffield Wednesday	Coventry
	Kilcline (pen.); Sedgley; Speedie 3x			Stadium: Highfield Road; Attendance: 15,191

14 January 1989 21	Norwich City	1–2	Coventry City	Norwich
			Speedie 2x	Stadium: Carrow Road; Attendance: 14,399

21 January 1989 22	Coventry City	2–1	Wimbledon	Coventry
	Kilcline; Speedie			Stadium: Highfield Road; Attendance: 12,472

4 February 1989 23	Middlesbrough	1–1	Coventry City	Middlesbrough
	Slaven		Regis	Stadium: Ayresome Park; Attendance: 17,352

11 February 1989 24	Coventry City	1–2	Newcastle United	Coventry
	Pingel (o.g.)		Mirandinha (pen.); Hendrie	Stadium: Highfield Road; Attendance: 16,577

21 February 1989 25	Coventry City	1–0	Arsenal	Coventry
	Kilcline (pen.)			Stadium: Highfield Road; Attendance: 21,390

25 February 1989 26	Millwall	1–0	Coventry City	The Den
				Stadium: London; Attendance: 13,021

11 March 1989 27	West Ham United	1–1	Coventry City	London
	Ince		Kilcline (pen.)	Stadium: Boleyn Ground; Attendance: 15,205

18 March 1989 28	Coventry City	1–1	Tottenham Hotspur	Coventry
	Bannister		Waddle	Stadium: Highfield Road; Attendance: 17,156

22 March 1989 29	Coventry City	1–3	Liverpool	Coventry
	Bannister		Whelan; Aldridge; Barnes	Stadium: Highfield Road; Attendance: 23,807

25 March 1989 30	Charlton Athletic	0–0	Coventry City	London
				Stadium: Selhurst Park; Attendance: 6,728

27 March 1989 31	Coventry City	2–1	Southampton	Coventry
	Borrows; Speedie		R. Wallace	Stadium: Highfield Road; Attendance: 11,734

1 April 1989 32	Derby County	1–0	Coventry City	Derby
	Blades			Stadium: Baseball Ground; Attendance: 15,175

8 April 1989 33	Coventry City	2–1	Norwich City	Coventry
	Phillips; Speedie			Stadium: Highfield Road; Attendance: 12,740

15 April 1989 34	Luton Town	2–2	Coventry City	Luton
			Regis; Smith	Stadium: Kenilworth Road; Attendance: 8,610

22 April 1989 35	Coventry City	0–3	Queens Park Rangers	Coventry
				Stadium: Highfield Road; Attendance: 11,246

29 April 1989 36	Manchester United	0–1	Coventry City	Manchester
	Bannister			Stadium: Old Trafford; Attendance: 29,799

13 May 1989 37	Aston Villa	1–1	Coventry City	Birmingham
	Platt		Bannister	Stadium: Villa Park; Attendance: 14,003

15 May 1989 38	Coventry City	2–2	Nottingham Forest	Coventry
	Regis; Clark			Stadium: Highfield Road; Attendance: 14,003

=== FA Cup ===
7 January 1989 Third round	Sutton United	2–1	Coventry City	Sutton
	Rains 42'; Hanlan 59'		Phillips 52'	Stadium: Gander Green Lane; Attendance: 8,000; Referee: Alf Buksh

=== League Cup ===
27 September 1988 Second round First leg	Bournemouth	0–4	Coventry City	Bournemouth
			Bannister; Downs; Gynn 2x	Stadium: Dean Court; Attendance: 6,543

11 October 1988 Second round Second leg	Coventry City	3–1 (7–1 agg.)	Bournemouth	Coventry
	Gynn; Sedgley; Speedie			Stadium: Highfield Road; Attendance: 7,212
Note: Coventry City won 7–1 on aggregate.

2 November 1988 Third round	Nottingham Forest	3–2	Coventry City	Nottingham
			Bannister; Kilcline (pen.)	Stadium: City Ground; Attendance: 21,201

=== Full Members' Cup ===
11 January 1989 Third round	Middlesbrough	1–0	Coventry City	Middlesbrough
				Stadium: Ayresome Park; Attendance: 9,938

== Squad ==
Note: Flags indicate national team as defined under FIFA eligibility rules; some limited exceptions apply. Players may hold more than one non-FIFA nationality.

Pos.	Nation	Player
GK	ENG	Steve Ogrizovic
GK	IRL	Dean Kiely
GK	ENG	Les Sealey
DF	ENG	Brian Borrows
DF	ENG	Graham Rodger
DF	ENG	Steve Sedgley
DF	SCO	Gary Gillespie
DF	ENG	Brian Kilcline
DF	ENG	Trevor Peake
DF	ENG	Tony Dobson
DF	ENG	Greg Downs
MF	WAL	David Phillips

Pos.	Nation	Player
MF	ENG	Howard Clark
MF	ENG	Dean Emerson
MF	ENG	Micky Gynn
MF	ENG	Lloyd McGrath
MF	ENG	David Smith
MF	ENG	Dave Bennett
MF	ENG	Keith Thompson
FW	ENG	Steve Livingstone
FW	ENG	Gary Bannister
FW	ENG	Keith Houchen
FW	ENG	Cyrille Regis
FW	SCO	David Speedie
