= Coventry City F.C. Player of the Year =

Annual award of Coventry City Football Club

The Coventry City Player of the Year award is voted for annually by Coventry City's supporters, in recognition of the best overall performance by an individual player throughout the football season.

Since the inaugural award was made to Ernie Machin, seven players have won the award twice and one player has won the award three times. Just one winner has gone on to manage the club permanently; that being Gary McAllister - however Steve Ogrizovic, Trevor Peake and Richard Shaw have all been caretaker managers for short periods.

== Voting mechanism ==
This award is voted for by the fans of the club. Toward the end of the season, fans are invited to vote, either by submitting a paper slip to the club's Ricoh Arena offices, or by email or text message, with the winner being the player that polls the most votes. A percentage of the votes from the 'Player of the Month' awards throughout the season also count towards the final votes for Player of the year.

== List of winners ==
Coventry City F.C. Hall of Fame inductee

Season	Level	Name	Position	Years at club
1967–68	1	(England) Ernie Machin	MF	1962–1972
1968–69	1	(England) Bill Glazier	GK	1964–1975
1969–70	1	(Scotland) Neil Martin	FW	1967–1970
1970–71	1	(Scotland) Willie Carr	MF	1967–1975
1971–72	1	(England) Ernie Hunt	MF	1968–1973
1972–73	1	(Scotland) Willie Carr (2)	MF	1967–1975
1973–74	1	(England) Bill Glazier (2)	GK	1964–1975
1974–75	1	(England) Graham Oakey	DF	1974–1977
1975–76	1	(Scotland) Tommy Hutchison	MF	1972–1980
1976–77	1	(Scotland) Jim Blyth	GK	1972–1982
1977–78	1	(Scotland) Ian Wallace	FW	1976–1980
1978–79	1	(Scotland) Bobby McDonald	DF	1976–1980
1979–80	1	(Scotland) Gary Gillespie	DF	1978–1983
1980–81	1	(England) Danny Thomas	DF	1972–1983
1981–82	1	(England) Danny Thomas (2)	DF	1972–1983
1982–83	1	(Scotland) Gary Gillespie (2)	DF	1978–1983
1983–84	1	(England) Nick Platnauer	MF	1983–1984
1984–85	1	(England) Terry Gibson	FW	1983–1986
1985–86	1	(England) Trevor Peake	DF	1983–1991
1986–87	1	(England) Steve Ogrizovic	GK	1984–2000
1987–88	1	(Scotland) David Speedie	FW	1987–1991
1988–89	1	(Scotland) David Speedie (2)	FW	1987–1991
1989–90	1	(England) Brian Borrows	DF	1985–1997
1990–91	1	(Scotland) Kevin Gallacher	FW	1990–1993
1991–92	1	(England) Stewart Robson	MF	1991–1995
1992–93	1	(England) Peter Atherton	DF	1991–1994
1993–94	1	(Republic of Ireland) Phil Babb	DF	1992–1994
1994–95	1	(England) Brian Borrows (2)	DF	1985–1997
1995–96	1	(England) Paul Williams	DF	1995–2001
1996–97	1	(England) Dion Dublin	FW	1994–1998
1997–98	1	(England) Dion Dublin (2)	FW	1994–1998
1998–99	1	(England) Richard Shaw	DF	1995–2006
1999–00	1	(Scotland) Gary McAllister	MF	1996–2000 & 2002–2003
2000–01	1	(Republic of Ireland) Gary Breen	DF	1997–2002
2001–02	2	(England) David Thompson	MF	2000–2002
2002–03	2	(Bosnia and Herzegovina) Muhamed Konjić	DF	1999–2004
2003–04	2	(England) Stephen Warnock	DF	2003–2004
2004–05	2	(Republic of Ireland) Michael Doyle	MF	2003–2011 & 2017–2019
2005–06	2	(England) Gary McSheffrey	FW	1998–2006 & 2010–2013
2006–07	2	(England) Andy Marshall	GK	2006–2009
2007–08	2	(Republic of Ireland) Jay Tabb	MF	2006–2009
2008–09	2	(Iceland) Aron Gunnarsson	MF	2008–2011
2009–10	2	(Republic of Ireland) Keiren Westwood	GK	2008–2011
2010–11	2	(Jamaica) Marlon King	FW	2010–2011
2011–12	2	(Republic of Ireland) Richard Keogh	DF	2010–2012
2012–13	3	(England) Carl Baker	MF	2010–2014 & 2018
2013–14	3	(England) Callum Wilson	FW	2009–2014
2014–15	3	(Scotland) Jim O'Brien	MF	2014–2016
2015–16	3	(Scotland) John Fleck	MF	2012–2016
2016–17	3	(Wales) George Thomas	FW	2013–2017
2017–18	4	(Scotland) Marc McNulty	FW	2017–2018
2018–19	3	(Scotland) Dominic Hyam	DF	2017–2022
2019–20	3	(England) Fankaty Dabo	DF	2019–2023
2020–21	2	(England) Callum O'Hare	MF	2019–2024
2021–22	2	(Netherlands) Gustavo Hamer	MF	2020–2023 & 2026–
2022–23	2	(Netherlands) Gustavo Hamer (2)	MF	2020–2023 & 2026–
2023–24	2	(England) Ben Sheaf	MF	2020–2025
2024–25	2	(England) Jack Rudoni	MF	2024–
2025–26	2	(England) Carl Rushworth	GK	2025–
2026–27	1			

=== Wins by playing position ===
Position	Number of winners
Goalkeeper	7
Defender	19
Midfielder	20
Forward	13

=== Wins by nationality ===
Nationality	Number of winners
England	30
Scotland	17
Republic of Ireland	6
Netherlands	2
Bosnia and Herzegovina	1
Iceland	1
Jamaica	1
Wales	1

== Other awards ==
Season	Level	Players' Player of the Season	Goal of the Season		Young Player of the Season (age at the time of the awards)	Community Player of the Season	CCFPA Player of the Season
2003–04	2	(England) Calum Davenport	(England) Richard Shaw	vs Gillingham	(Republic of Ireland) Michael Doyle (22 years old)	not awarded	not awarded
2004–05	2	(England) Stephen Hughes	(England) Andy Whing	vs Derby County	(England) Isaac Osbourne (19 years old)	not awarded	not awarded
2005–06	2	(England) Gary McSheffrey	(Trinidad and Tobago) Stern John	vs Middlesbrough	(Wales) Richard Duffy (20 years old)	not awarded	not awarded
2006–07	2	(England) Marcus Hall	(Malta) Michael Mifsud	vs Sheffield Wednesday	(England) Isaac Osbourne (21 years old) (2)	not awarded	not awarded
2007–08	2	not awarded	(Malta) Michael Mifsud (2)	vs Manchester United	(Republic of Ireland) Leon Best (21 years old)	not awarded	not awarded
2008–09	2	(England) Danny Fox	(Republic of Ireland) David Bell	vs Doncaster Rovers	(England) Ben Turner (21 years old)	(Iceland) Aron Gunnarsson	not awarded
2009–10	2	(Republic of Ireland) Keiren Westwood	(Republic of Ireland) David Bell (2)	vs Crystal Palace	(England) Jordan Clarke (18 years old)	(Republic of Ireland) Clinton Morrison	(Scotland) James McPake
2010–11	2	(Republic of Ireland) Richard Keogh	(England) Gary McSheffrey	vs Burnley	(England) Lukas Jutkiewicz (22 years old)	(England) Carl Baker	(England) Ben Turner
2011–12	2	(Republic of Ireland) Richard Keogh (2)	(England) Jordan Clarke	vs Cardiff City	(Republic of Ireland) Cyrus Christie (19 years old)	(Burundi) Gaël Bigirimana	(Republic of Ireland) Richard Keogh
2012–13	3	(England) Carl Baker	(Belgium) Franck Moussa	vs MK Dons	(Republic of Ireland) Cyrus Christie (20 years old) (2)	(France) William Edjenguélé	(England) Carl Baker
2013–14	3	(England) Callum Wilson	(Belgium) Franck Moussa (2)	vs Preston North End	(England) Conor Thomas (20 years old)	(England) Conor Thomas	not awarded
2014–15	3	(Scotland) John Fleck	(Scotland) Jim O'Brien	vs Walsall	(England) Matthew Pennington (20 years old)	(Benin) Réda Johnson	(Scotland) Jim O'Brien
2015–16	3	(Scotland) John Fleck (2)	(England) Adam Armstrong	vs Millwall	(England) Adam Armstrong (19 years old)	(Wales) Sam Ricketts	(Scotland) John Fleck
2016–17	3	not awarded	(England) Ben Stevenson	vs MK Dons	(Wales) George Thomas (20 years old)	(Wales) George Thomas	(Burundi) Gaël Bigirimana
2017–18	4	(Scotland) Marc McNulty	(France) Maxime Biamou	vs Cheltenham Town	(England) Tom Bayliss (19 years old)	(England) Chris Stokes	(Republic of Ireland) Michael Doyle
2018–19	3	(Scotland) Dominic Hyam	(England) Jordy Hiwula	vs Fleetwood Town	(Nigeria) Bright Enobakhare (21 years old)	(Scotland) Jack Grimmer	(England) Jordan Willis
2019–20	3	(England) Liam Walsh	(England) Liam Walsh	vs Rochdale	(England) Liam Walsh (22 years old)	(Republic of Ireland) Jordan Shipley	(England) Fankaty Dabo
2020–21	2	(England) Callum O'Hare	(Netherlands) Gustavo Hamer	vs Watford	(England) Callum O'Hare (23 years old)	(Scotland) Liam Kelly	(England) Callum O'Hare
2021–22	2	(Sweden) Viktor Gyökeres	(Republic of Ireland) Jordan Shipley	vs Queens Park Rangers	(Netherlands) Ian Maatsen (20 years old)	(Scotland) Liam Kelly (2)	(Sweden) Viktor Gyökeres
2022–23	2	(Sweden) Viktor Gyökeres (2)	(Netherlands) Gustavo Hamer (2)	vs Stoke City	(England) Callum Doyle (19 years old)	(England) Kyle McFadzean	(Sweden) Viktor Gyökeres (2)
2023–24	2	(England) Ben Sheaf	(United States) Haji Wright	vs Wolves	(England) Ellis Simms (23 years old)	(England) Ben Sheaf	(England) Ben Sheaf
2024–25	2	awards not announced, for unclear reasons				(England) Ben Wilson	(England) Jack Rudoni
2025–26	2	(England) Carl Rushworth	(England) Ellis Simms	vs Middlesbrough	(England) Carl Rushworth (24 years old)	(England) Kaine Kesler-Hayden	(England) Matt Grimes
2026–27	1						
