= 1992–93 Coventry City F.C. season =

Coventry City
1992–93 season
- Chairman: Peter Robins
- Manager: Bobby Gould
- Stadium: Highfield Road
- Premier League: 15th
- FA Cup: Third round
- League Cup: Second round
- Top goalscorer: Quinn (17)
- Average home league attendance: 14,951
Home colours	Away colours

During the 1992–93 English football season, Coventry City competed in the inaugural season of the FA Premier League.

== Season summary ==
After narrowly avoiding relegation the previous season, Coventry's form improved this season and the club finished in a stable 15th position. The club began the season with a run of six wins from their opening eight games to sit in second place, but a run of 11 games without a win, albeit a run with only three defeats, dragged the club down to ninth. The club's form for the next quarter of the season saw the club rise to fifth with a genuine possibility of challenging for European qualification. However, after the sale of striker Robert Rosario (a key provider for the firepower of the likes of Micky Quinn and Peter Ndlovu) to strugglers Nottingham Forest, another run of 11 games with only one win dragged Coventry to 15th, the lowest place they had occupied all season - finishing only three points above the relegation zone. Survival had already been secured by the final day of the season, the campaign ending with a thrilling 3–3 draw with Leeds United.

== Kit ==
Coventry City's kit was manufactured by Ribero and sponsored by French car maker Peugeot.

== Final league table ==
Pos	Team	Pld	W	D	L	GF	GA	GD	Pts
13	Everton	42	15	8	19	53	55	−2	53
14	Sheffield United	42	14	10	18	54	53	+1	52
15	Coventry City	42	13	13	16	52	57	−5	52
16	Ipswich Town	42	12	16	14	50	55	−5	52
17	Leeds United	42	12	15	15	57	62	−5	51

Source: Premier League
Rules for classification: 1) points; 2) goal difference; 3) number of goals scored.

== Results ==
Coventry City's score comes first

=== Legend ===
Win	Draw	Loss

=== FA Premier League ===
Date	Opponent	Venue	Result	Attendance	Scorers
15 August 1992	Middlesbrough	H	2–1	12,681	J Williams, Smith
19 August 1992	Tottenham Hotspur	A	2–0	24,388	J Williams (2)
22 August 1992	Wimbledon	A	2–1	3,759	Gynn, Rosario
26 August 1992	Queens Park Rangers	H	0–1	13,563	
29 August 1992	Blackburn Rovers	H	0–2	14,541	
2 September 1992	Sheffield Wednesday	A	2–1	22,874	Ndlovu, Hurst
5 September 1992	Oldham Athletic	A	1–0	11,254	Gallacher
14 September 1992	Tottenham Hotspur	H	1–0	15,348	J Williams
21 September 1992	Nottingham Forest	A	1–1	17,553	Rosario
26 September 1992	Norwich City	H	1–1	16,436	Ndlovu
3 October 1992	Crystal Palace	H	2–2	11,808	Pearce, Gallacher
17 October 1992	Everton	A	1–1	17,587	Ndlovu
24 October 1992	Chelsea	H	1–2	15,626	Rosario
31 October 1992	Leeds United	A	2–2	28,018	McAllister (own goal), Ndlovu
7 November 1992	Arsenal	A	0–3	27,693	
21 November 1992	Manchester City	H	2–3	14,590	Quinn (2)
28 November 1992	Sheffield United	A	1–1	15,625	Quinn
5 December 1992	Ipswich Town	H	2–2	11,294	Gallacher, Quinn
12 December 1992	Southampton	A	2–2	12,306	Quinn (2)
19 December 1992	Liverpool	H	5–1	19,779	Borrows (2, 1 pen), Gallacher, Quinn (2)
26 December 1992	Aston Villa	H	3–0	24,245	Quinn (2), Rosario
28 December 1992	Manchester United	A	0–5	36,025	
9 January 1993	Nottingham Forest	H	0–1	15,264	
16 January 1993	Norwich City	A	1–1	13,613	Quinn
23 January 1993	Oldham Athletic	H	3–0	10,544	Gallacher (2), Ndlovu
26 January 1993	Blackburn Rovers	A	5–2	15,215	May (own goal), Hurst, J Williams, Quinn (2)
30 January 1993	Wimbledon	H	0–2	11,774	
6 February 1993	Middlesbrough	A	2–0	14,008	Ndlovu, Quinn
20 February 1993	Queens Park Rangers	A	0–2	12,453	
27 February 1993	Crystal Palace	A	0–0	12,248	
3 March 1993	Sheffield Wednesday	H	1–0	13,806	Gynn
7 March 1993	Everton	H	0–1	11,285	
10 March 1993	Manchester City	A	0–1	20,092	
13 March 1993	Arsenal	H	0–2	15,437	
20 March 1993	Ipswich Town	A	0–0	16,698	
24 March 1993	Sheffield United	H	1–3	12,993	J Williams
3 April 1993	Southampton	H	2–0	10,463	Quinn (pen), J Williams
10 April 1993	Aston Villa	A	0–0	38,543	
12 April 1993	Manchester United	H	0–1	24,429	
17 April 1993	Liverpool	A	0–4	33,328	
1 May 1993	Chelsea	A	1–2	14,186	Quinn
8 May 1993	Leeds United	H	3–3	19,591	J Williams, Quinn, Ndlovu

=== FA Cup ===
Round	Date	Opponent	Venue	Result	Attendance	Goalscorers
R3	13 January 1993	Norwich City	A	0–1	15,301	

=== League Cup ===
Round	Date	Opponent	Venue	Result	Attendance	Goalscorers
R2 First Leg	23 September 1992	Scarborough	H	2–0	5,993	Borrows (pen), Ndlovu
R2 Second Leg	7 October 1992	Scarborough	A	0–3 (lost 2–3 on agg)	2,633	

== Squad ==
Note: Flags indicate national team as defined under FIFA eligibility rules; some limited exceptions apply. Players may hold more than one non-FIFA nationality.

Pos.	Nation	Player
GK	WAL	Martin Davies
GK	ENG	Jonathan Gould
GK	ENG	Steve Ogrizovic
DF	ENG	Peter Atherton
DF	ENG	Phil Babb
DF	ENG	Peter Billing
DF	ENG	Martyn Booty
DF	ENG	Brian Borrows (captain)
DF	ENG	David Busst
DF	ENG	Chris Greenman
DF	ENG	Andy Pearce
DF	SCO	David Rennie
DF	NIR	Keith Rowland (on loan from AFC Bournemouth)
MF	IRL	Willie Boland
MF	ENG	Terry Fleming

Pos.	Nation	Player
MF	ENG	Sean Flynn
MF	ENG	Micky Gynn
MF	ENG	Lee Hurst
MF	ENG	Leigh Jenkinson
MF	ENG	Lloyd McGrath
MF	ENG	Craig Middleton
MF	ENG	Stewart Robson
MF	IRL	Tony Sheridan
MF	ENG	David Smith
MF	ENG	Ray Woods
FW	ZIM	Peter Ndlovu
FW	ENG	Micky Quinn
FW	USA	Roy Wegerle
FW	ENG	John Williams
FW	NIR	Paul Williams

=== Left club during season ===
Note: Flags indicate national team as defined under FIFA eligibility rules; some limited exceptions apply. Players may hold more than one non-FIFA nationality.

Pos.	Nation	Player
DF	ENG	Kenny Sansom (to Everton)
MF	ENG	David Smith (on loan to AFC Bournemouth)

Pos.	Nation	Player
FW	ENG	Robert Rosario (to Nottingham Forest)
FW	SCO	Kevin Gallacher (to Blackburn Rovers)

== Transfers ==
=== In ===
- Micky Quinn - Newcastle United, 20 November, £250,000

=== Out ===
- Kevin Gallacher - Blackburn Rovers, £1,500,000
