= 1991–92 Blackburn Rovers F.C. season =

Blackburn Rovers
1991–92 season
- Owner: Jack Walker
- Chairman: Bill Fox (until 9 December); Robert Coar
- Manager: Don Mackay (until 2 September); Tony Parkes (caretaker from 2 September - 12 October); Kenny Dalglish (from 12 October)
- Stadium: Ewood Park
- Second Division: 6th (promoted)
- FA Cup: Fourth round
- League Cup: First round
- Full Members Cup: First round
- Average home league attendance: 13,250
Home colours

During the 1991–92 English football season, Blackburn Rovers F.C. competed in the Football League Second Division.

== Season summary ==
In the 1991–92 season, Blackburn Rovers began with Don Mackay still manager, but he was soon sacked to make way for Kenny Dalglish. Dalglish made several substantial signings during the season. After his appointment Blackburn climbed up the league table, but later lost six games in a row, causing them to fall out of the play-off places, but Blackburn fought back and a 3–1 victory at Plymouth got Rovers to the final play off place. The club reached the play-off final at Wembley where they beat Leicester City 1–0 thanks to a Mike Newell penalty.

== Final league table ==
Pos	Team	Pld	W	D	L	GF	GA	GD	Pts	Qualification or relegation
1	Ipswich Town (C, P)	46	24	12	10	70	50	+20	84	Promotion to the FA Premier League
2	Middlesbrough (P)	46	23	11	12	58	41	+17	80	Promotion to the FA Premier League
3	Derby County	46	23	9	14	69	51	+18	78	Qualification for the Second Division play-offs
4	Leicester City	46	23	8	15	62	55	+7	77	Qualification for the Second Division play-offs
5	Cambridge United	46	19	17	10	65	47	+18	74	Qualification for the Second Division play-offs
6	Blackburn Rovers (O, P)	46	21	11	14	70	53	+17	74	Qualification for the Second Division play-offs
7	Charlton Athletic	46	20	11	15	54	48	+6	71	Qualification for the First Division (Note: From the 1992–93 season, the first tier became the Premier League, the second tier - then known as the Second Division - was renamed to the First Division, and the third tier - then known as the Third Division - was renamed to the Second Division.)
8	Swindon Town	46	18	15	13	69	55	+14	69	Qualification for the First Division
9	Portsmouth	46	19	12	15	65	51	+14	69	Qualification for the First Division
10	Watford	46	18	11	17	51	48	+3	65	Qualification for the First Division
11	Wolverhampton Wanderers	46	18	10	18	61	54	+7	64	Qualification for the First Division
12	Southend United	46	17	11	18	63	63	0	62	Qualification for the First Division
13	Bristol Rovers	46	16	14	16	60	63	−3	62	Qualification for the First Division
14	Tranmere Rovers	46	14	19	13	56	56	0	61	Qualification for the First Division
15	Millwall	46	17	10	19	64	71	−7	61	Qualification for the First Division
16	Barnsley	46	16	11	19	46	57	−11	59	Qualification for the First Division
17	Bristol City	46	13	15	18	55	71	−16	54	Qualification for the First Division
18	Sunderland	46	14	11	21	61	65	−4	53	Qualification for the First Division
19	Grimsby Town	46	14	11	21	47	62	−15	53	Qualification for the First Division
20	Newcastle United	46	13	13	20	66	84	−18	52	Qualification for the First Division
21	Oxford United	46	13	11	22	66	73	−7	50	Qualification for the First Division
22	Plymouth Argyle (R)	46	13	9	24	42	64	−22	48	Relegation to the Second Division
23	Brighton & Hove Albion (R)	46	12	11	23	56	77	−21	47	Relegation to the Second Division
24	Port Vale (R)	46	10	15	21	42	59	−17	45	Relegation to the Second Division

Rules for classification: 1) Points; 2) Goal difference; 3) Goals scored
(C) Champions; (O) Play-off winners; (P) Promoted; (R) Relegated

== Results ==
Blackburn Rovers' score comes first

=== Football League Second Division ===
Date	Opponent	Venue	Result	Attendance	Scorers
17 August 1991	Portsmouth	H	1–1	11,118	Moran
24 August 1991	Bristol City	A	0–1	11,317	
31 August 1991	Ipswich Town	H	1–2	8,898	Speedie
4 September 1991	Derby County	A	2–0	12,078	Speedie, Wilcox
7 September 1991	Sunderland	A	1–1	17,043	Speedie
14 September 1991	Port Vale	H	1–0	10,225	Speedie
17 September 1991	Watford	H	1–0	9,542	Richardson
21 September 1991	Leicester City	A	0–3	13,287	
28 September 1991	Tranmere Rovers	H	0–0	11,449	
5 October 1991	Millwall	A	3–1	8,026	Johnrose, Speedie, Garner
12 October 1991	Plymouth Argyle	H	5–2	10,830	Moran, Speedie (2), Garner (2)
19 October 1991	Swindon Town	A	1–2	10,717	Speedie
26 October 1991	Grimsby Town	H	2–1	11,096	Garner, Atkins
2 November 1991	Brighton & Hove Albion	H	1–0	9,877	Livingstone
5 November 1991	Southend United	A	0–3	4,860	
9 November 1991	Charlton Athletic	A	2–0	7,114	Speedie, Sellars
16 November 1991	Barnsley	H	3–0	13,797	Wilcox, Speedie, Newell
23 November 1991	Newcastle United	A	0–0	23,639	
30 November 1991	Middlesbrough	H	2–1	15,541	Atkins, Newell
7 December 1991	Oxford United	A	3–1	5,924	Cowans, Garner, Sellars
14 December 1991	Bristol Rovers	H	3–0	12,295	Sellars, Atkins (2)
26 December 1991	Wolverhampton Wanderers	A	0–0	18,277	
28 December 1991	Ipswich Town	A	1–2	17,675	Wright
1 January 1992	Cambridge United	H	2–1	15,001	Speedie, Reid
11 January 1992	Bristol City	H	4–0	12,964	Speedie, (own goal), Newell (2)
18 January 1992	Portsmouth	A	2–2	20,106	Speedie (2)
1 February 1992	Swindon Town	H	2–1	14,887	Speedie, Hendry
8 February 1992	Grimsby Town	A	3–2	10,014	Price, Sellars, Wilcox
11 February 1992	Derby County	H	2–0	15,350	Price, Atkins
15 February 1992	Newcastle United	H	3–1	19,511	Speedie (3)
22 February 1992	Middlesbrough	A	0–0	19,353	
25 February 1992	Cambridge United	A	1–2	7,857	Hendry
29 February 1992	Oxford United	H	1–1	13,917	Sellars
7 March 1992	Bristol Rovers	A	0–3	6,313	
10 March 1992	Southend United	H	2–2	14,404	Price, Speedie
14 March 1992	Brighton & Hove Albion	A	3–0	10,845	Hendry, Speedie, Wegerle
21 March 1992	Charlton Athletic	H	0–2	14,844	
28 March 1992	Barnsley	A	1–2	13,346	Shearer
31 March 1992	Port Vale	A	0–2	10,384	
11 April 1992	Watford	A	1–2	10,552	Wegerle
14 April 1992	Wolverhampton Wanderers	H	1–2	14,114	Sellars
18 April 1992	Leicester City	H	0–1	18,075	
20 April 1992	Tranmere Rovers	A	2–2	13,705	
25 April 1992	Millwall	H	2–1	12,820	Newell, Atkins
29 April 1992	Sunderland	H	2–2	15,079	Hendry, Sellars
2 May 1992	Plymouth Argyle	A	3–1	17,459	Speedie (3)

=== Second Division play-offs ===
Round	Date	Opponent	Venue	Result	Attendance	Goalscorers
SF 1st Leg	10 May 1992	Derby County	H	4–2	19,677	Sellars, Newell, Speedie (2)
SF 2nd Leg	13 May 1992	Derby County	A	1–2 (won 5-4 on agg)	22,920	Moran
F	25 May 1992	Leicester City	N	1–0	68,147	Newell (pen)

=== FA Cup ===
Round	Date	Opponent	Venue	Result	Attendance	Goalscorers
R3	4 January 1992	Kettering Town	H	4–1	13,821	Cowans, Speedie, Newell (2)
R4	4 February 1992	Notts County	A	1–2	12,173	Newell 89'

=== League Cup ===
Round	Date	Opponent	Venue	Result	Attendance	Goalscorers
R1 1st Leg	20 August 1991	Hull City	H	1–1	6,308	(own goal)
R1 2nd Leg	27 August 1991	Hull City	A	0–1 (lost 1-2 on agg)	3,227	

=== Full Members Cup ===
Round	Date	Opponent	Venue	Result	Attendance	Goalscorers
NR1	1 October 1991	Port Vale	A	0–1	2,355	

== Squad ==
Note: Flags indicate national team as defined under FIFA eligibility rules; some limited exceptions apply. Players may hold more than one non-FIFA nationality.

Pos.	Nation	Player
GK	ENG	Bobby Mimms
GK	ENG	Matt Dickins
DF	ENG	Richard Brown
DF	ENG	Rob Dewhurst
DF	ENG	Tony Dobson
DF	ENG	Mike Duxbury
DF	SCO	Colin Hendry
DF	ENG	Keith Hill
DF	ENG	David May
DF	IRL	Kevin Moran
DF	SCO	Stuart Munro
DF	ENG	Chris Price
DF	ENG	Nicky Reid
DF	ENG	Chris Sulley
DF	ENG	Alan Wright
MF	ENG	Steve Agnew
MF	ENG	Mark Atkins
MF	ENG	Peter Baah

Pos.	Nation	Player
MF	ENG	Russell Beardsmore (on loan from Manchester United)
MF	ENG	Gordon Cowans
MF	SCO	Alan Irvine
MF	ENG	Lenny Johnrose
MF	ENG	Lee Richardson
MF	ENG	Scott Sellars
MF	ENG	Paul Shepstone
MF	ENG	Tim Sherwood
MF	ENG	Craig Skinner
MF	ENG	Jason Wilcox
FW	ENG	Simon Garner
FW	ENG	Howard Gayle
FW	ENG	Steve Livingstone
FW	ENG	Mike Newell
FW	SCO	Duncan Shearer
FW	SCO	David Speedie
FW	ENG	Peter Thorne
FW	USA	Roy Wegerle
