= David Speedie =

Scottish footballer

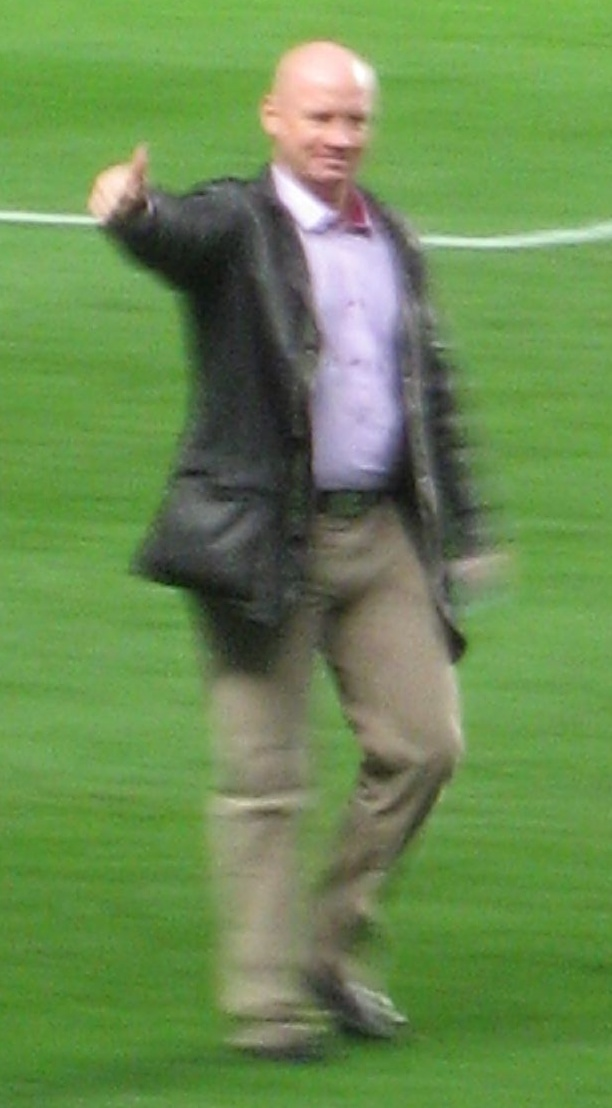

Personal information
- Full name: David Robert Speedie
- Date of birth: 20 February 1960 (age 66)
- Place of birth: Glenrothes, Scotland
- Height: 5 ft 7 in (1.70 m)
- Position: Striker

Youth career
- 19??–1978: Brodsworth Welfare

Senior career*
Years	Team	Apps	(Gls)
1978–1980	Barnsley	23	(0)
1980–1982	Darlington	88	(21)
1982–1987	Chelsea	162	(47)
1987–1991	Coventry City	122	(31)
1991	Liverpool	12	(6)
1991–1992	Blackburn Rovers	36	(23)
1992–1993	Southampton	11	(0)
1992	→ Birmingham City (loan)	10	(2)
1992	→ West Bromwich Albion (loan)	7	(2)
1993	→ West Ham United (loan)	11	(4)
1993–1994	Leicester City	37	(12)
1994–1995	Crawley Town		
1995–1996	Atherstone United		
1996–1997	Hendon	5	(0)
1997–1999	Stamford		
1999–2000	Harrow Borough		
2000–2001	Crook Town		
2001–200?	Darlington Railway Athletic		
200?–2007	Rainworth Miners Welfare		
Total		524	(148)

International career
1985–1989	Scotland	10	(0)
- * Club domestic league appearances and goals

David Robert Speedie (born 20 February 1960) is a Scottish former footballer who played for several clubs in England during the 1980s and 1990s, most notably Chelsea, Coventry City, Liverpool and Blackburn Rovers. He accumulated more than 500 football league appearances and scored almost 150 goals in a 14-year professional career. He also earned ten international caps for Scotland.

== Playing career ==
=== Early career ===
Born in Glenrothes, Scotland but raised in Yorkshire, Speedie worked as a coalminer, playing for Brodsworth Welfare, before signing professional terms with Barnsley in 1978. Without having scored a single goal for Barnsley in 21 appearances, he moved to Darlington in 1980, where his talent first became apparent. Just two years later, he was spotted by then-Chelsea manager John Neal, who signed him for £80,000 in May 1982.

=== Chelsea ===
Speedie had a five-year stint at Chelsea where he formed a prolific strike partnership with Kerry Dixon. Speedie's strength, scoring prowess, work-rate and unlikely heading ability (he is 5 ft 7 in tall) perfectly complemented both Dixon and winger Pat Nevin as the trio notched up over 200 goals between them in three years. Before the arrival of Nevin and Dixon, however, Speedie had played an important part in Chelsea's survival in the Second Division a year earlier, with his seven goals (including two on his debut against Oldham Athletic) that season proving crucial. Speedie was the Chelsea Player of the Year 1985 and popular with the fans for his consistent gutsy performances.

In 1986, he became the first senior player since Geoff Hurst in the 1966 World Cup final to score a hat-trick at Wembley, as Chelsea defeated Manchester City 5–4 in the Full Members Cup final, after Chelsea had led 5–1. That year Chelsea finished sixth in the league, having been in the hunt for the league title for most of the season before a late slump in form ruled them out of contention in the final weeks.

Speedie left Chelsea in 1987 with three years left on his contract due to disagreements with the hierarchy.

=== Coventry City ===
Having scored 64 goals in 205 appearances for the West London side, Speedie joined Coventry City for £750,000 in July 1987 following a disagreement with Chelsea manager John Hollins. His first appearance was in the 1987 FA Charity Shield against Everton where he narrowly missed out on scoring on his debut. This statistic would be rectified just a week later however when in an effective replay of the 1987 Cup Final at Highfield Road Speedie scored with a fine low shot past Ray Clemence to set up a 2–1 win over Spurs. Whilst Coventry were hampered in their post Cup final season by a disintegrating pitch, Speedie earned the notable distinction of scoring a hat-trick whilst finishing on the losing side in a 3–4 defeat against Middlesbrough.

Speedie combined with the aerial strength of Cyrille Regis and the wide options of David Smith, David Phillips, Micky Gynn and Brian Borrows to score some memorable goals. His chipped winning goal at Carrow Road against a high-flying Norwich City side, was almost universally described in the press as 'sublime'. This became the Speedie trademark at Coventry and was used to great effect against the likes of Wimbledon and Southampton. He was a key component in the Coventry City side in the 1988/89 campaign, beating the champions-elect Arsenal and riding as high as 3rd in the league as late as February. They would only lose 5 games on their travels that season-winning the same number away from home. Their 7th-place finish was only the third time a top 8 place had been achieved.

The latter half of his spell at Coventry would see him drop back into a deeper midfield role which led to a significant reduction in his goals tally. He enjoyed just under four years at Coventry, none of which were relegation battles, scoring 35 goals (Cup and league). This equalled his Chelsea strike rate and enabled him to maintain a presence in the Scottish international side. His indiscipline and habit of courting controversy was always a major weakness. Speedie left Highfield Road amid the turbulent and transitional autumn/winter period of 1990/91, which would see manager John Sillett replaced by Terry Butcher.

=== Later career ===
Speedie joined Liverpool in January 1991 and became Kenny Dalglish's last signing before his resignation on 22 February 1991. Dalglish had been interested in signing Speedie four years earlier when he was still at Chelsea.

He scored on his Liverpool debut at Old Trafford then scored twice in the Merseyside Derby in the next league game, and by the end of the season had scored six goals for the Reds - all in the league.

However, his Liverpool career was short and when Graeme Souness took over as manager he was sold that summer to Blackburn Rovers, where Dalglish returned to management soon afterwards. On the final day of the 1991-92 season, he scored a hat-trick in a win which relegated Plymouth Argyle but most significantly fired Rovers into the play-offs and would be a major step towards a new era for the club, beginning with a playoff final victory which took them into the new FA Premier League, which they won three years later.

Speedie was not to be part of Blackburn's Premier League adventures. He was sold to Southampton for £400,000, replacing Alan Shearer who had moved the other way for £3.6million, a national record fee. Speedie joined the Saints at the same time as his old Chelsea strike partner Kerry Dixon. Speedie has said of his time at Saints, "Biggest mistake of my career, should never have gone to Southampton."

He made just seven appearances (without scoring) for the Saints in the 1992–93 league campaign, making his Premier League debut, having unsuccessful loan spells with Birmingham City and West Bromwich Albion before another loan deal in early March took him to Division One promotion contenders West Ham United. His four goals in 11 league games helped the Hammers secure automatic promotion to the Premier League as Division One runners-up.

Speedie was not offered a permanent contract with West Ham. Instead, he accepted on offer from Brian Little to sign for Division One promotion hopefuls Leicester City. He scored 12 goals in 37 league games for the East Midlands side in 1993–94 as they qualified for the playoffs and sealed promotion to the Premier League by defeating local rivals Derby County 2–1 in the playoff final at Wembley Stadium. Speedie missed that game through suspension and retired later in the year due to injury, having never featured in the Premier League for the Foxes.

=== International ===
Speedie made his senior debut for Scotland on 25 May 1985 in a 1–0 Rous Cup tie win over England. He won the last of his 10 full caps for Scotland on 30 May 1989 against Chile, also a Rous Cup tie, which Scotland won 2–0. However, Speedie never scored for the Scottish national side.

== Later life ==
Speedie continued his career at non-league level for a host of clubs including Stamford AFC and Hendon where he made five appearances whilst failing to score. Indeed, his most impressive 45 minutes came as a replacement goalkeeper for the second half of Hendon's first game of the 1996–97 season against Sutton United after first choice Scott Ashcroft got injured just before half time. He also made a handful of Northern League appearances for Crook Town. He retired having scored 150 career goals.

Speedie lived for a while in Dublin where he commented for Setanta Sports and played for Francis AFC in Dublin's United Churches League.

Speedie allegedly made racist remarks at a charity event in 2004. In 2020, Chelsea removed Speedie's name from the only two named entrances of Stamford Bridge stadium, put up by former club chairman Ken Bates in the 1980s.

== Career statistics ==
Appearances and goals by club, season and competition
Club	Season	League			FA Cup		League Cup		Other		Total	
Club	Season	Division	Apps	Goals	Apps	Goals	Apps	Goals	Apps	Goals	Apps	Goals
Barnsley
Barnsley	1978–79	Fourth Division	10	0	0	0	0	0	—		10	0
Barnsley	1979–80	Third Division	13	0	0	0	0	0	—		13	0
Barnsley	Total		23	0	0	0	0	0	0	0	23	0
Darlington
Darlington	1980–81	Fourth Division	44	4	1	0	2	0	—		47	4
Darlington	1981–82	Fourth Division	44	17	2	1	2	0	—		48	18
Darlington	Total		88	21	3	1	4	0	0	0	95	22
Chelsea
Chelsea	1982–83	Second Division	34	7	3	0	3	2	—		40	9
Chelsea	1983–84	Second Division	37	13	1	0	3	0	—		41	13
Chelsea	1984–85	First Division	35	10	3	2	9	4	—		47	16
Chelsea	1985–86	First Division	34	14	2	2	8	1	5 (Note: Appearances in Full Members' Cup)	5	49	22
Chelsea	1986–87	First Division	22	3	3	1	1	0	2	0	28	4
Chelsea	Total		162	47	12	5	24	7	7	5	205	64
Coventry City
Coventry City	1987–88	First Division	36	6	2	0	2	0	3 (Note: Appearances in Charity Shield (1 appearance) and Full Members' Cup (2 appearances, 1 goal))	1	43	7
Coventry City	1988–89	First Division	36	14	1	0	3	1	1	0	41	15
Coventry City	1989–90	First Division	32	8	1	0	7	1	—		40	9
Coventry City	1990–91	First Division	18	3	0	0	3	1	—		21	4
Coventry City	Total		122	31	4	0	15	3	4	1	145	35
Liverpool	1990–91	First Division	12	6	2	0	—		—		14	6
Blackburn Rovers	1991–92	Second Division	36	23	2	1	2	0	3 (Note: Appearances in 1992 Second Division play-offs)	2	43	26
Southampton	1992–93	Premier League	11	0	0	0	1	0	—		12	0
Birmingham City (loan)	1992–93	First Division	10	2	0	0	0	0	2 (Note: Appearances in Anglo-Italian Cup)	0	12	2
West Bromwich Albion (loan)	1992–93	Second Division	7	2	0	0	0	0	2 (Note: Appearances in Football League Trophy)	0	9	2
West Ham United (loan)	1992–93	First Division	11	4	0	0	0	0	—		11	4
Leicester City	1993–94	First Division	37	12	1	0	3	1	1 (Note: Appearances in 1994 First Division play-offs)	1	42	14
Hendon	1996–97	Isthmian Premier	5	0	0	0	—		—		5	0
Career total			524	148	24	7	49	11	19	9	616	175

== Honours ==
Barnsley

- Football League Fourth Division promotion: 1978–79

Chelsea

- Football League Second Division: 1983–84
- Full Members' Cup: 1985–86

Blackburn Rovers

- Football League Second Division play-offs: 1992

West Ham United

- Football League First Division promotion: 1992–93

Stamford

- United Counties League: 1997–98
- Benevolent Cup: 1997–98
- Lincolnshire Senior 'A' Cup: 1997–98
- Hinchingbrooke Cup: 1997–98

Scotland

- The Rous Cup: 1985

Individual

- Chelsea Player of the Year: 1985
- PFA Team of the Year: 1991–92 Second Division
