= Peter Billing =

English footballer

Personal information
- Full name: Peter Graham Billing
- Date of birth: 24 October 1964 (age 61)
- Place of birth: Liverpool, England
- Height: 6 ft 2 in (1.88 m)
- Position: Central defender

Youth career
- 1985–1986: South Liverpool

Senior career*
| Years | Team | Apps | (Gls) |
| 1986 | Everton | 1 | (0) |
| 1986–1989 | Crewe Alexandra | 88 | (1) |
| 1989–1993 | Coventry City | 58 | (1) |
| 1993 | → Port Vale (loan) | 12 | (0) |
| 1993–1995 | Port Vale | 14 | (0) |
| 1995–1996 | Hartlepool United | 36 | (0) |
| 1996–1997 | Crewe Alexandra | 15 | (0) |
| 1997–1998 | Northwich Victoria | | |
| 1998 | Bamber Bridge | | |
| 1999–2000 | Witton Albion | | |
| Total | | 224 | (2) |
- * Club domestic league appearances and goals

Peter Graham Billing (born 24 October 1964) is an English former footballer who played in central defence. He made 281 league and cup appearances in an eleven-year career in the Football League.

A former South Liverpool player, he turned professional with Everton in January 1986. He featured in the Super Cup final, but he was sold to Crewe Alexandra for £12,000 in December 1986. He helped the "Railwaymen" to win promotion out of the Fourth Division in 1988–89, before he was sold to Coventry City for £120,000 in June 1989. He made 58 top-flight appearances for the "Sky Blues" before joining Port Vale for a £35,000 fee in May 1993, following a successful three-month loan spell in which he featured in the club's Football League Trophy success. He helped the "Valiants" to win promotion out of the Second Division in 1993–94. He was allowed to leave on a free transfer in May 1995. He then spent a season each with Hartlepool United and former club Crewe Alexandra before he went into non-League football with Northwich Victoria, Bamber Bridge and Witton Albion.

== Career ==
Born in Liverpool, Billing started his career with local non-League side South Liverpool before being signed up by Howard Kendall at Everton in January 1986. He only played one First Division game for the "Toffees". Also, he featured in both legs of the 1986 Super Cup final defeat to rivals Liverpool. He left Goodison Park after being sold to Crewe Alexandra for £12,000 in December 1986. The "Railwaymen" finished 17th in the Fourth Division in 1986–87 and 1987–88. Manager Dario Gradi took the Gresty Road club to promotion in 1988–89 with a third-place finish. Billing made 88 league appearances for the club in his two and a half seasons in Cheshire.

He was sold to Coventry City for £120,000 in June 1989 as manager John Sillett needed defensive cover. The "Sky Blues" finished 12th in the top-flight in the 1989–90 season, though Billing had to wait until October before making his club debut in the League Cup. They then dropped to 16th in 1990–91 under new boss Terry Butcher, before finishing 19th in 1991–92, one place and two points above relegated Luton Town. Coventry played in the first-ever season of Premier League football in 1992–93 under Bobby Gould, though Billing lost his first-team place by 1993–94 after new boss Phil Neal took over at Highfield Road. Billing made 58 league appearances for the Midlands side.

He was loaned to Second Division club Port Vale in February 1993. He impressed manager John Rudge and was signed permanently for a £35,000 fee in May 1993. Two of his 17 appearances for the "Valiants" in 1992–93 were as a substitute for Robin van der Laan in the 1993 Football League Trophy final and the play-off final, both at Wembley. Vale won the cup game 2–1 over Stockport County, but were beaten 3–0 by West Bromwich Albion in the play-off final. He did, though, help the club to achieve promotion with a second-place finish in 1993–94. His first-team chances limited in 1994–95, he was given a free transfer to Hartlepool United in May 1995. He played 43 games at Victoria Park under Keith Houchen, helping "Pools" to a 20th-place finish in the Third Division in 1995–96. He returned to Crewe in August 1996 and made 15 league appearances, helping Alex to win promotion out of the Second Division via the play-offs in 1996–97. However, he did not feature in the play-off final. He then headed into the Conference with Northwich Victoria but was transfer-listed in January 1998. He later played for Bamber Bridge, but left Bamber Bridge in March 1998. He signed with Witton Albion, but retired in September 1999 to concentrate on becoming a PE instructor. He came out of retirement to rejoin Witton Albion two months later. He started 35 games in the 1999–2000 campaign as Nigel Gleghorn's Albion finished third in the Northern Premier League Division One, missing out on both promotion and the league title on goal difference.

== Style of play ==
Billing was a "fearsome combative" defender.

== Career statistics ==
Appearances and goals by club, season and competition
| Club | Season | League | | | FA Cup | | Other | | Total | |
| Club | Season | Division | Apps | Goals | Apps | Goals | Apps | Goals | Apps | Goals |
|---|---|---|---|---|---|---|---|---|---|---|
| Everton | 1985–86 | First Division | 1 | 0 | 0 | 0 | 4 | 0 | 5 | 0 |
| Crewe Alexandra | 1986–87 | Fourth Division | 19 | 0 | 0 | 0 | 1 | 0 | 20 | 0 |
| Crewe Alexandra | 1987–88 | Fourth Division | 32 | 0 | 1 | 0 | 5 | 0 | 38 | 0 |
| Crewe Alexandra | 1988–89 | Fourth Division | 37 | 1 | 4 | 0 | 5 | 0 | 46 | 1 |
| Crewe Alexandra | Total | | 88 | 1 | 5 | 0 | 11 | 0 | 104 | 1 |
| Coventry City | 1989–90 | First Division | 18 | 0 | 1 | 0 | 5 | 0 | 24 | 0 |
| Coventry City | 1990–91 | First Division | 15 | 0 | 4 | 0 | 3 | 0 | 22 | 0 |
| Coventry City | 1991–92 | First Division | 22 | 1 | 2 | 0 | 4 | 0 | 28 | 1 |
| Coventry City | 1992–93 | Premier League | 3 | 0 | 0 | 0 | 0 | 0 | 3 | 0 |
| Coventry City | Total | | 58 | 1 | 7 | 0 | 12 | 0 | 77 | 1 |
| Port Vale | 1992–93 | Second Division | 12 | 0 | 0 | 0 | 5 | 0 | 17 | 0 |
| Port Vale | 1993–94 | Second Division | 8 | 0 | 0 | 0 | 1 | 0 | 9 | 0 |
| Port Vale | 1994–95 | First Division | 6 | 0 | 0 | 0 | 0 | 0 | 6 | 0 |
| Port Vale | Total | | 26 | 0 | 0 | 0 | 6 | 0 | 32 | 0 |
| Hartlepool United | 1995–96 | Third Division | 36 | 0 | 1 | 0 | 6 | 0 | 43 | 0 |
| Crewe Alexandra | 1996–97 | Second Division | 15 | 0 | 2 | 0 | 3 | 0 | 20 | 0 |
| Career total | | | 224 | 2 | 15 | 0 | 42 | 0 | 281 | 2 |

== Honours ==
Everton

- Super Cup runner-up: 1986

Crewe Alexandra

- Football League Fourth Division third-place promotion: 1988–89

Port Vale

- Football League Trophy: 1992–93
- Football League Second Division second-place promotion: 1993–94
