= Go for It (song) =

"Go for It" was a single released by the English football team Coventry City to commemorate reaching the 1987 FA Cup Final. It reached number 61 in the UK Singles Chart. In contrast, Tottenham Hotspur, whom Coventry defeated in the final, reached number 18 with their single "Hot Shot Tottenham!"
