= Neil Midgley (referee) =

English football referee (1942–2001)

- Born: 9 September 1942; Salford, Lancashire, England
- Died: 8 July 2001 (aged 58); Kearsley, Bolton, England

Domestic
Years	League	Role
1977–1992	Football League	Referee

International
Years	League	Role
1982–1991	FIFA listed	Referee

Neil Midgley (9 September 1942 – 8 July 2001) was an English football referee from Salford.

== Career ==
Midgley joined the Eccles Referees' Association in 1961 after taking up refereeing, being awarded a life membership in 1978. He became a Football League linesman in 1974 and two years later a supplementary referee, graduating to the full list one year later in 1977. In April 1982 he took charge of an FA Cup semi-final between Tottenham Hotspur and Leicester City and that summer was elevated to the FIFA list of international referees. In 1985, he was appointed to the Milk Cup Final between Norwich City and Sunderland with the Norfolk team winning via a Gordon Chisholm own goal.

At the start of the 1986–87 season, he was awarded control of the 1986 FA Charity Shield match between Everton and Liverpool at Wembley, which finished 1–1, the trophy being shared.

On 16 May 1987, he stepped out once more at Wembley to take charge of the FA Cup Final between Coventry City and Tottenham Hotspur, which finished 3–2 to the 'Sky Blues'.

Midgley reached the standard retirement age in 1991 but was granted a one-year extension due to his strong performances. It was on 17 February in this year that he controversially did not award Everton a penalty at Anfield against Liverpool in the FA Cup when Pat Nevin was brought down in the Liverpool penalty area. The Co-commentator for BBC coverage on that day was Trevor Brooking who remarked that "you will never see a more clear cut penalty in my opinion". Midgley was in charge of a 1992 FA Cup semi-final between Sunderland and Norwich before retiring at the end of the season. He then became a referees' assessor for the newly formulated Premier League competition, and for UEFA. However, in 1999, he was replaced as a Premiership assessor by Martin Bodenham, although still retained in that capacity by the European governing body. He had also been a past president of the Football League Referees and Linesmen's Association, and was an active member of the Eccles Referees' Association. He became the ERA chairman early in his career, and served as their president from 1983 to 1989 and from 1992 until his death.

== Death ==
Neil Midgley died at the Little Hulton Hospice in Salford, a few months after being diagnosed with cancer. He was 58. In his honour, The Eccles Referees' Association changed the name of its award for the senior level Referee of the Year from the President's Cup to the Neil Midgley Memorial Trophy. Barbara Midgley presents the trophy to the winner each year.

== Print references ==
- Football League Handbooks, 1974–1992 – confirmation of dates of joining lists of referees and linesmen

== Internet ==
Preceded by Alan Robinson	FA Cup Final Referee; 1987	Succeeded by Brian Hill
