= 1986–87 Chelsea F.C. season =

English football club season

Chelsea
1986–87 season
- Chairman: Ken Bates
- Manager: John Hollins
- Stadium: Stamford Bridge
- First Division: 14th
- FA Cup: Fourth round
- League Cup: Third round
- Full Members Cup: Fourth round
- Top goalscorer: League: Kerry Dixon (10); All: Kerry Dixon (12)
- Highest home attendance: 29,301 vs Arsenal (7 March 1987)
- Lowest home attendance: 9,546 vs Oxford United (20 September 1986)
- Average home league attendance: 17,694
- Biggest win: 4–0 v Oxford United (10 February 1987)
- Biggest defeat: 2–6 v Nottingham Forest (8 September 1984)
Home colours	Away colours

The 1986–87 season was Chelsea Football Club's seventy-third competitive season.

== Table ==
Pos	Team	Pld	W	D	L	GF	GA	GD	Pts
12	Southampton	42	14	10	18	69	68	+1	52
13	Sheffield Wednesday	42	13	13	16	58	59	−1	52
14	Chelsea	42	13	13	16	53	64	−11	52
15	West Ham United	42	14	10	18	52	67	−15	52
16	Queens Park Rangers	42	13	11	18	48	64	−16	50

Source: World Football
Rules for classification: 1) Points; 2) Goal difference; 3) Goals scored
