= 1984–85 Chelsea F.C. season =

English football club season

Chelsea
1984–85 season
- Chairman: Ken Bates
- Manager: John Neal
- Stadium: Stamford Bridge
- First Division: 6th
- FA Cup: Fourth round
- League Cup: Semi-finals
- Top goalscorer: League: Kerry Dixon (24); All: Kerry Dixon (36)
- Highest home attendance: 42,197 vs Manchester United (29 December 1984)
- Lowest home attendance: 13,267 vs Aston Villa (16 April 1985)
- Average home league attendance: 23,065
- Biggest win: 5–0 v Wigan Athletic (26 January 1985)
- Biggest defeat: 2–4 v Aston Villa (8 September 1984)
Home colours	Away colours

The 1984–85 season was Chelsea Football Club's seventy-first competitive season. With 24 goals, Kerry Dixon was the First Division's top goalscorer (jointly with Gary Lineker), the first Chelsea player to do this since Jimmy Greaves in 1961.

== Table ==
Pos	Team	Pld	W	D	L	GF	GA	GD	Pts	Qualification or relegation
4	Manchester United (Note: Manchester United would have qualified for the Cup Winners' Cup as FA Cup winners.)	42	22	10	10	77	47	+30	76	Qualified for the Football League Super Cup and disqualified from the European Cup Winners' Cup
5	Southampton	42	19	11	12	56	47	+9	68	Qualified for the Football League Super Cup and disqualified from the UEFA Cup
6	Chelsea	42	18	12	12	63	48	+15	66	
7	Arsenal	42	19	9	14	61	49	+12	66	
8	Sheffield Wednesday	42	17	14	11	58	45	+13	65	

Source: World Football
Rules for classification: 1) Points; 2) Goal difference; 3) Goals scored
