= Martin Davies (footballer) =

Welsh footballer

Personal information
- Date of birth: 28 June 1974 (age 52)
- Place of birth: Swansea, Wales
- Position: Goalkeeper

Senior career*
Years	Team	Apps	(Gls)
1990–1995	Coventry City	0	(0)
1995–1996	Cambridge United	16	(0)
1996–1997	Rushden & Diamonds	61	(0)
1997–1998	Dover Athletic	26	(0)
1998–2004	Cambridge City	254	(0)
Total		357	(0)
- * Club domestic league appearances and goals

Martin Davies (born 28 June 1974 in Swansea, Wales) is a Welsh footballer who played for Coventry City, Cambridge United, Rushden & Diamonds, Dover Athletic and Cambridge City. He was a professional with Coventry City for five years but never played a first team game, before playing his only 16 league appearances with Cambridge United. He then played 61 times for Rushden & Diamonds and continued playing non-league football with Dover Athletic, Cambridge City, Port Talbot, Corby and Stamford before retiring in 2009.

After his retirement, he went on to become head of goalkeeping at Cambridge United.

In January 2017, he returned to his hometown club Swansea City to become the U23 goalkeeper coach.
