= 1987 FA Cup final =

English association football match

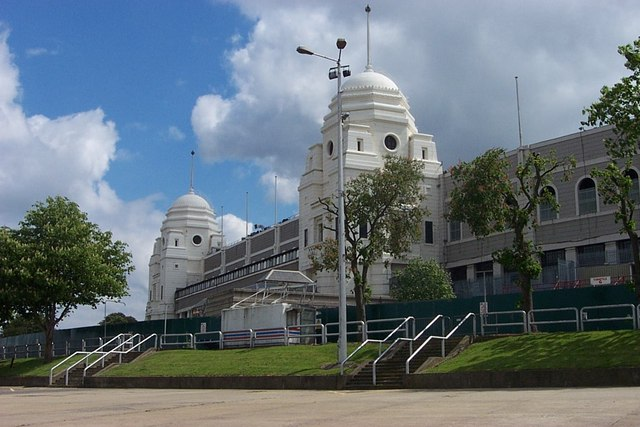
- Wembley Stadium, site of the final
- Event: 1986–87 FA Cup
Coventry City	Tottenham Hotspur
3	2
- After extra time
- Date: 16 May 1987
- Venue: Wembley Stadium, London
- Referee: Neil Midgley (Manchester)
- Attendance: 96,000
- Weather: Sunny

The 1987 FA Cup final between Coventry City and Tottenham Hotspur on 16 May 1987 at Wembley Stadium, London, England was the 106th Final of the FA Cup, English football's primary cup competition. It was the third final for Tottenham Hotspur in seven years, the team having won the trophy in 1981 and 1982, while Coventry were making their first appearance. Both clubs were in the Football League First Division that season, giving them entry into the competition in the third round. They each won five games en route to the final, with Coventry beating Leeds United 3–2 and Tottenham beating Watford 4–1 in their respective semi-finals. Both clubs recorded songs to commemorate reaching the final. After a December league match between the two sides had finished 4–3 to Coventry, both Tottenham manager David Pleat and Coventry joint-manager John Sillett anticipated an exciting final.

Neil Midgley refereed the match in front of a crowd of 96,000. Within two minutes of the kick-off, Tottenham took the lead. Chris Waddle played in a cross from the right wing and Clive Allen beat defender Trevor Peake to the ball to head it past Steve Ogrizovic in the Coventry goal. The scores were level seven minutes later: a deep cross from Greg Downs was headed on by Keith Houchen to Dave Bennett who rounded Ray Clemence and struck the ball past Steve Hodge into the corner of the Tottenham goal. Coventry's Cyrille Regis had a goal disallowed and then, five minutes before half-time, Tottenham restored their one-goal lead. A free kick from Hoddle was touched on by Gary Mabbutt and bounced into the far corner of the Coventry goal. Midway through the second half, Coventry were level once again, with Houchen converting a Bennett cross with a diving header, which would later be selected as the BBC Goal of the Season. With the game even at full time, extra time was needed to decide the match. The only goal of extra time was scored in its first period when a cross from Lloyd McGrath looped off Mabbutt's left knee and over Clemence for an own goal, making the final score 3–2 to Coventry.

The match is regarded by many pundits as one of the greatest finals in the history of the competition, with BBC TV commentator John Motson calling it "the finest Cup Final I've had the pleasure of commentating on". Allen's goal was his 49th goal of the season for Tottenham which, as of 2021, remains a club record. Having won the FA Cup, Coventry would normally have qualified to participate in the 1987–88 European Cup Winners' Cup, but the ban on English clubs in European football following the Heysel Stadium disaster meant they were unable to take part, along with Tottenham who would have qualified for the 1987–88 UEFA Cup having finished third in the league.

== Background ==
The FA Cup is an annual knockout tournament involving professional and amateur men's association football clubs in the English football league system. It is the world's oldest football cup competition. The 1986–87 tournament began in August 1986 with the preliminary round, followed by qualification rounds and then the rounds of the tournament itself culminating in the showpiece final. According to their level within the league system, many teams received byes through to later rounds. As First Division clubs, Coventry City and Tottenham Hotspur both received byes through to the third round which featured the last 64 teams in the competition. The 1987 final was the 106th final to be played since it was first held in 1872.

In the two league matches between Coventry and Tottenham during the season, each side won their home games. The fixture at White Hart Lane in November 1986 was won 1–0 by Tottenham, with Allen scoring the only goal. The return match at Coventry's Highfield Road was held one month later, shortly after Christmas. In a match described by Coventry City historian Jim Brown as an "epic encounter", Tottenham led 2–1 at half-time but Dave Bennett turned the game around after the interval with two goals in four minutes. Tottenham thought they had salvaged a point with a Nico Claesen equaliser two minutes before the end but Cyrille Regis scored in injury time to secure a 4–3 win for Coventry. Tottenham finished the league campaign in third place, while Coventry ended in tenth position. The 1987 final was Tottenham Hotspur's third FA Cup final in seven years and eighth overall, their most recent appearance being the 1982 FA Cup Final where they beat Queens Park Rangers 1–0 in a replay after drawing the original final 1–1. Coventry were making their first domestic cup final appearance.

== Route to the final ==
=== Coventry City ===
Coventry's route to the final
Round	Opposition	Score
3rd	Bolton Wanderers (H)	3–0
4th	Manchester United (A)	1–0
5th	Stoke City (A)	1–0
QF	Sheffield Wednesday (A)	3–1
SF	Leeds United (N)	3–2
Key: (H) = Home venue; (A) = Away venue; (N) = Neutral venue

Coventry began their FA Cup campaign in the third round with a match against Third Division side Bolton Wanderers at Highfield Road in early January. Coventry won 3–0 in frozen conditions, with Greg Downs, Regis and Bennett scoring the goals. The club's manager for the 1986–87 season was George Curtis, with John Sillett as first-team coach; the two were effectively joint managers. Their fourth-round match was away against Manchester United at Old Trafford. Curtis told the press before the game that "our name is on the cup", but United were the firm favourites. The game was once again played on a frozen pitch and Coventry won 1–0 through a Keith Houchen goal. Recently appointed United manager Alex Ferguson cited Coventry's better play for his team's defeat, saying "their players were prepared to risk life and limb – ours weren't".

Another away match followed in the fifth round, this time at Stoke City of the Second Division, who had suffered only one defeat since November. The home side played better in the first half but Coventry withstood the pressure and once again took the game 1–0, Micky Gynn scoring on the rebound after David Phillips had failed to convert a Nick Pickering cross in the 72nd minute. The quarter-final was at Hillsborough against Sheffield Wednesday and scores were level after a first-half Regis goal was cancelled out by a 67th-minute equaliser by Gary Megson but Coventry scored twice in the final stages to progress to their first ever semi-final, against Leeds United.

The semi-final was also played at Hillsborough, this time as a neutral venue, and 27,000 Coventry supporters travelled to Sheffield for the game. Leeds were in the Second Division at the time and Coventry were pre-match favourites, but Leeds started better, forcing goalkeeper Steve Ogrizovic to make two early saves and taking the lead after 14 minutes. Coventry played better after going behind, with Regis going close to scoring on three occasions, and eventually equalised after 69 minutes through a Gynn goal. Houchen's goal ten minutes later gave them a 2–1 lead but Leeds equalised with seven minutes remaining. Bennett scored nine minutes into extra time and Coventry held on for the win.

=== Tottenham Hotspur ===
Tottenham Hotspur's route to the final
Round	Opposition	Score
3rd	Scunthorpe United (H)	3–2
4th	Crystal Palace (H)	4–0
5th	Newcastle United (H)	1–0
QF	Wimbledon (A)	2–0
SF	Watford (N)	4–1
Key: (H) = Home venue; (A) = Away venue; (N) = Neutral venue

Tottenham also began their FA Cup campaign in the third round, with a home match against Fourth Division side Scunthorpe United. It was Scunthorpe's first game at White Hart Lane, and despite the large separation in league position, the two sides were evenly matched in the first half. Gary Mabbutt opened the scoring for Tottenham on 19 minutes, before Steve Johnson equalised for the visitors four minutes later. With the cold wind at their backs, Tottenham began to control the game after half-time, opening up a 3–1 lead through Claesen and Chris Waddle goals. Ken DeMange made it 3–2 late in the game, and Scunthorpe had the chance to force a replay in the final minute through a Johnson header, but it was saved by Tottenham goalkeeper Ray Clemence. Tottenham's fourth-round match was more straightforward, as they beat Second Division Crystal Palace 4–0 at White Hart Lane. Mabbutt and a Gary O'Reilly own-goal made it 2–0 at half-time, before a Clive Allen penalty and Claesen goal sealed the game.

In a match described by Martin Howey of the Newcastle Journal as "captivating", Tottenham beat fellow First Division side Newcastle United 1–0 in the fifth round. The game's only goal was scored by Allen, again from the penalty spot, after Newcastle's Peter Jackson was deemed by the referee to have fouled Richard Gough. Their quarter-final opponents were Wimbledon, who had advanced to that round of the competition for the first time. In a scrappy game, featuring numerous free kicks and offside decisions, Wimbledon held on until 80 minutes after which late goals by Glenn Hoddle and Waddle sealed a 2–0 win for Tottenham. Manager David Pleat said afterwards that his team had performed well defensively, despite Wimbledon's style of play being "difficult to contend with".

In the semi-final, played in April 1987 at the neutral venue of Villa Park in Birmingham, Tottenham faced Graham Taylor's Watford. Despite playing into the wind in the first half, Tottenham dominated the game from the start. They took the lead after 11 minutes when Steve Hodge followed up a long-range Allen shot, which Watford goalkeeper Gary Plumley had failed to hold. Two minutes later, Plumley was beaten again when John McClelland deflected another Allen shot into his own goal. Watford began to create more chances as Tottenham eased off, forcing Clemence to make two difficult saves in succession. But the Londoners reasserted control 10 minutes before half-time as Paul Allen retrieved a cleared corner, beat two defenders and fired a left-footed shot past Plumley. Claesen replaced the injured Allen on 75 minutes, helping to set up Tottenham's fourth goal with his first touch. Claesen's pass reached Ossie Ardiles, who in turn passed to Waddle, whose lay-off was finished by Hodge. Watford then scored a late consolation goal through Malcolm Allen, giving a final score of 4–1 to Tottenham.

== Match ==
=== Pre-match ===
Both clubs recorded songs to commemorate reaching the final. London musicians Chas & Dave released a song called "Hot Shot Tottenham!" which reached number 18 in the UK Singles Chart. Coventry's single "Go for It" reached number 61. Having never lost in their seven previous finals, Tottenham were considered by bookmakers as heavy favourites to win. All but one of the 13 players in their squad had played international football, many with considerable Wembley experience, and striker Allen had netted 48 goals in the season to date. By contrast, Coventry had only one international in Phillips, and only four of their players had appeared at the national stadium. Speaking a week before the game, Irish defender Jimmy Holmes, who had previously played for both clubs, predicted that with the talent of Hoddle, Ardiles, Waddle, Hodge and Allen, Tottenham would be hard to beat. He did not write off Coventry's chances altogether, however, noting that "if they go at [Tottenham], and keep them under pressure, anything is possible". Recalling the league game at Highfield Road, Pleat predicted an exciting game, noting that "neither side knows how to defend, and both have pace in midfield"; he also expressed optimism that the players and supporters would approach match "in a good spirit" citing improved refereeing, a reduction in hooliganism in English football, and increased crowds. Sillett also predicted an exciting final, saying "it could be a classic – and it won't be for the want of trying".

Both sides adopted a 4–4–2 formation. Coventry had to play without regular full-back Brian Borrows, after he suffered an injury in the season's final league game. His place in the starting 11 was taken by midfielder Gynn, with Phillips moving from the midfield to the defence to replace Borrows. Tottenham fielded a full-strength squad, with Chris Hughton playing at right back in place of Gary Stevens. Hughton had missed all but ten of the team's games since November due to an injury but was fit for the final, and Pleat's decision was influenced in part by Stevens's potential versatility as a substitute. It was the first season in which teams were allowed to select two substitutes for an FA Cup match.

Tottenham wore all-white kit while Coventry played in blue-and-white striped shirts, navy shorts and blue socks. In the league match at Highfield Road, the referee had deemed the two kits too similar in colour and, because they had not brought their away kit, Tottenham had been ordered to wear Coventry's yellow away shirts. There was no such issue with their kit for the final, although due to a mix-up only half of the Tottenham players wore the Holsten sponsorship on their shirts. The referee for the match was Neil Midgley of Greater Manchester. After the national anthem was played, the Duchess of Kent was introduced to both sides by their respective captains, while accompanied by Bert Millichip, chairman of the Football Association.

=== First half ===
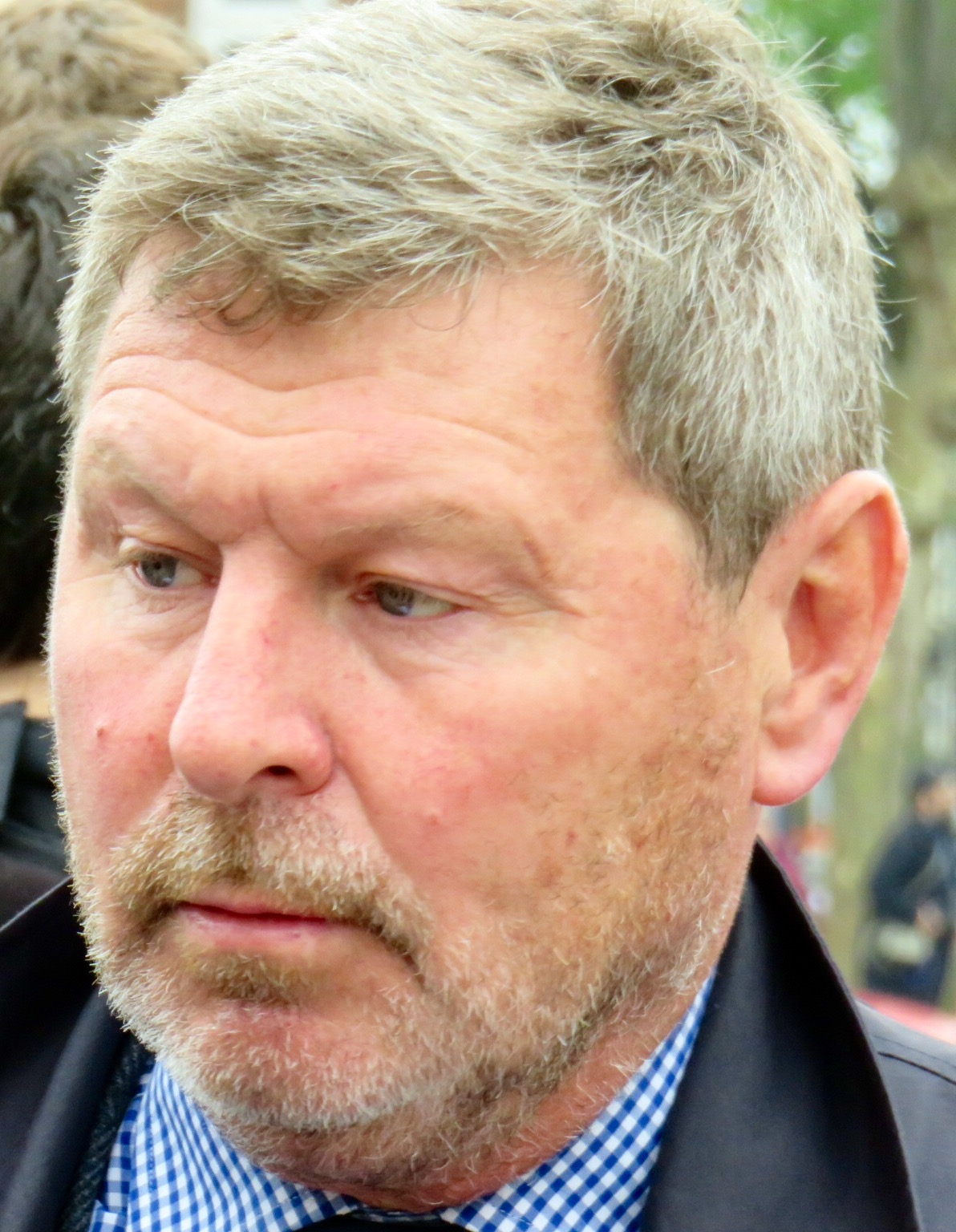
Clive Allen (pictured in 2016) opened the scoring in the 1987 FA Cup Final with his 49th goal of the season.

Tottenham kicked off the match around 3 p.m. in front of a Wembley crowd of 96,000 and in hot conditions. Within two minutes of the kick-off, Tottenham took the lead. Waddle played in a cross from the right wing and Clive Allen beat defender Trevor Peake to the ball to head it past Coventry's Ogrizovic for his 49th goal of the season. In the fifth minute, Regis played a pass to Downs on the left wing, whose deep cross was fingertipped out by Clemence for a corner, which came to nothing. Three minutes later, Mitchell Thomas fouled Gynn deep in the Tottenham half: the resulting free kick was eventually cleared to Gynn who passed to Regis whose cross was cleared but the ball fell to Phillips and his snap-shot was deflected away. Coventry maintained the pressure and in the ninth minute levelled the score. A deep cross from Downs was headed on by Houchen to Bennett who rounded Clemence and struck the ball past Hodge into the corner of the Tottenham goal. Two minutes later, a high cross from Houchen was dropped by Clemence but cleared by Hughton. In the 18th minute, Hoddle was fouled by Pickering around 25 yards (23 m) from the Coventry goal: Waddle's left-footed direct free kick flew narrowly over the bar.

Midway through the first half, Coventry won a throw-in deep in Tottenham territory. The long throw from Phillips was flicked on by Houchen before Regis headed it into the goal past a diving Clemence but it was disallowed for a push on Thomas. In the 27th minute, Hoddle's out-swinging corner was headed goalbound by Gough but was defended by Peake whose defensive header looped into the hands of Ogrizovic. Three minutes later, a backpass from Peake was chased down by Clive Allen, forcing Orgizovic to run from his area and make a hurried clearance which was intercepted by Hoddle. The Tottenham midfielder's shot was blocked by Peake whose pass to Ogrizovic was misplaced, allowing Clive Allen another chance which this time he struck into the side-netting. In the 32nd minute, Waddle shot from around 25 yards (23 m) but his low strike was gathered by Ogrizovic before Clive Allen could capitalise. Waddle then dribbled the ball from just outside the centre circle before taking a diagonal shot which was stopped by Ogrizovic. The Coventry goalkeeper made another save from Waddle minutes later with another low shot from outside the area.

In the 35th minute, a quick break from Coventry saw Regis run at the Tottenham defence before passing the ball through to Gynn. His shot was low and hard to Clemence's right-hand side but the Tottenham goalkeeper saved before Mabbutt cleared it out. Two minutes later, Thomas passed the ball to Hodge on the left side, halfway into the Coventry half. He took the ball to the goal line before his cross-come-shot had to be tipped behind by Ogrizovic. A long free kick from just over the halfway line was lofted by Brian Kilcline to the edge of the Tottenham penalty area where Houchen headed it on: the ball fell to Pickering who held off his marker to turn and shoot but the ball bounced into Clemence's hands. Late in the half, Pickering fouled Paul Allen on the right-hand touchline, midway into the Coventry half. Hoddle's free kick into the penalty area flew over three defenders and fell to Mabbutt whose left-footed strike bounced into the Coventry goal to make it 2–1 to Tottenham after 41 minutes. It was not initially clear who had got the final touch, and the BBC TV commentators initially credited the goal as an own goal to Kilcline: not until after the match did Mabbutt get the credit. In the final minute of the first half, a high cross from Kilcline from the right-hand side of the pitch was headed by Mabbutt into the path of Regis. He flicked it first time to Pickering whose shot on the turn was defended by Gough to allow Clemence to gather the ball. After a brief period of stoppage time, the referee blew the whistle to end the half.

=== Second half ===
Neither side made any changes to their teams during the half-time period, and Coventry got the second half underway. In the 49th minute, Hoddle was dispossessed by Lloyd McGrath and the ball fell to Gynn. His run down the right wing culminated in a low cross into the Tottenham penalty area which was cleared by Gough. From the resulting throw-in, Tottenham made a quick break from deep in their own half, and a high ball from Hoddle found Clive Allen with space on the right-hand side of the pitch. He dribbled towards the Coventry penalty area, cut onto his left foot and struck the ball high and wide of the goal. On 54 minutes, a poor defensive clearance from Peake was collected by Hughton who played the ball to Hoddle: his mazy run towards the Coventry area ended with a cross which was narrowly missed by Clive Allen but caught by Ogrizovic. Almost immediately, a long ball upfield from Kilcline found Gynn amongst four Tottenham defenders: he strode towards the penalty area but his attempted pass was cut out by Gough. In the 59th minute, a free kick from Downs was headed on to Kilcline whose header was caught by Clemence.

In the 63rd minute, a long goal-kick from Ogrizovic was headed on by Regis to Houchen. He controlled the ball before passing out to Bennett on the right wing while continuing his run into the Tottenham penalty area. Bennett controlled the ball before producing a right-footed cross which Houchen struck past Clemence with a diving header into the bottom-left corner of the goal to make it 2–2. Six minutes later, Waddle cut in from the right wing and passed to Hoddle who held the ball up before nutmegging McGrath to find Paul Allen in the penalty area: his shot was caught by Ogrizovic. In the 70th minute, a quick throw-in from Bennett found Phillips whose cross into the box was headed goalward by Houchen but was saved by Clemence low to his left. Paul Allen's 73rd minute shot from distance cleared the Coventry bar. On 79 minutes, Hoddle played the ball from deep in the Coventry half on the right wing into the penalty area to Hodge. He turned his defender to make a low cross which was struck high and wide by Clive Allen. Waddle then received the ball from a throw-in just into the Coventry half: he advanced and struck a left-footed shot from around 30 yards (27 m) past the post.

In the 82nd minute, Regis received the ball following a flick-on from an Ogrizovic goal-kick, and ran with it into the Tottenham penalty area. With six defenders in his way, eventually the ball was collected by Clemence. With less than two minutes of regulation time remaining, Hughton crossed from the right into the Coventry box, where Clive Allen controlled it before shooting on the turn from close range: Ogrizovic saved it with his foot. In the 89th minute, Coventry made the first substitution of the match, with Graham Rodger coming on to replace Kilcline who had sustained an injury in an earlier mis-timed tackle on Mabbutt. The scores stayed level until full-time and the game went into extra time.

=== Extra time ===
During the break, Tottenham made their first substitution of the game, with Stevens coming on to replace Ardiles, before Tottenham kicked off the first period of extra time. Five minutes into extra time, Hodge received the ball in his own half and ran towards the Coventry goal, beating three defenders before his shot was blocked by Downs on the edge of the penalty area. In the 96th minute, Rodger picked up a loose ball from Tottenham and advanced over the half-way line before sending a left-footed pass out to McGrath in space on the right wing. McGrath then ran into the Tottenham penalty area and crossed the ball which Mabbutt deflected upwards off his left knee and over Clemence to score an own goal, making it 3–2 to Coventry. Before the teams kicked off again, Tottenham made their second and final substitution, Claesen coming on to replace Hughton. With five minutes of the first period of extra time remaining, Coventry broke quickly from their own half, as Bennett found Gynn. He dribbled to the edge of the Tottenham box before being fouled by Gough; the resulting free kick was struck straight into Hoddle in the defensive wall. Two minutes later, Bennett played the ball into the penalty area to the feet of Houchen whose low first-time shot was saved by Clemence down to his right. The referee brought the first period of extra time to a close, with the score 3–2 to Coventry.

No change was made by the Coventry team during the break and they kicked off the second period of extra time. Neither side dominated the early stages, but in the 109th minute, Gynn made an incisive run towards the edge of the Tottenham area, laying the ball off to Pickering whose placed shot went wide and high of the goal. With ten minutes to go, a corner from Hoddle was punched away by Ogrizovic, and Bennett cleared the danger. In the 112th minute, Regis had the ball on the corner of the Tottenham penalty area and passed to Gynn who ran towards the goal, but his strike was wide of the post. Clive Allen then saw his weak shot easily picked up by Ogrizovic. With three minutes remaining, a wayward pass from Mabbutt was intercepted by Bennett who quickly passed to Gynn. He ran into the Tottenham area, rode the challenge of Stevens and took the ball wide before shooting, but Clemence caught the strike. Coventry began to run down the clock by keeping possession but Tottenham still had a long-range volley from Hoddle which was gathered by Ogrizovic. It proved to be the final chance of the game as the referee blew the whistle for full time, with Coventry winning the FA Cup for the first time in their history.

=== Details ===
16 May 1987
15:00

Coventry City	3–2 (a.e.t.)	Tottenham Hotspur
Bennett 9'; Houchen 63'; Mabbutt 96' (o.g.)	Report	C. Allen 2'; Mabbutt 41'

Wembley Stadium, London
Attendance: 96,000
Referee: Neil Midgley (Manchester)

Coventry	Tottenham Hotspur

GK	1	(England) Steve Ogrizovic
RB	2	(Wales) David Phillips
LB	3	(England) Greg Downs
MF	4	(England) Lloyd McGrath
CB	5	(England) Brian Kilcline (c)	(substituted off) 89'
CB	6	(England) Trevor Peake
MF	7	(England) Dave Bennett
MF	8	(England) Micky Gynn
CF	9	(England) Cyrille Regis
CF	10	(England) Keith Houchen
MF	11	(England) Nick Pickering
Substitutes:
DF	14	(England) Graham Rodger	(substituted on) 89'
MF	12	(England) Steve Sedgley
Manager:
(England) John Sillett and (England) George Curtis

GK	1	(England) Ray Clemence
RB	2	(Republic of Ireland) Chris Hughton	(substituted off) 97'
LB	3	(England) Mitchell Thomas
MF	4	(England) Steve Hodge
CB	5	(Scotland) Richard Gough (c)
CB	6	(England) Gary Mabbutt
CF	7	(England) Clive Allen
MF	8	(England) Paul Allen
MF	9	(England) Chris Waddle
MF	10	(England) Glenn Hoddle
MF	11	(Argentina) Ossie Ardiles	(substituted off) 91'
Substitutes:
FW	12	(Belgium) Nico Claesen	(substituted on) 97'
DF	14	(England) Gary Stevens	(substituted on) 91'
Manager:
(England) David Pleat

== Post-match ==
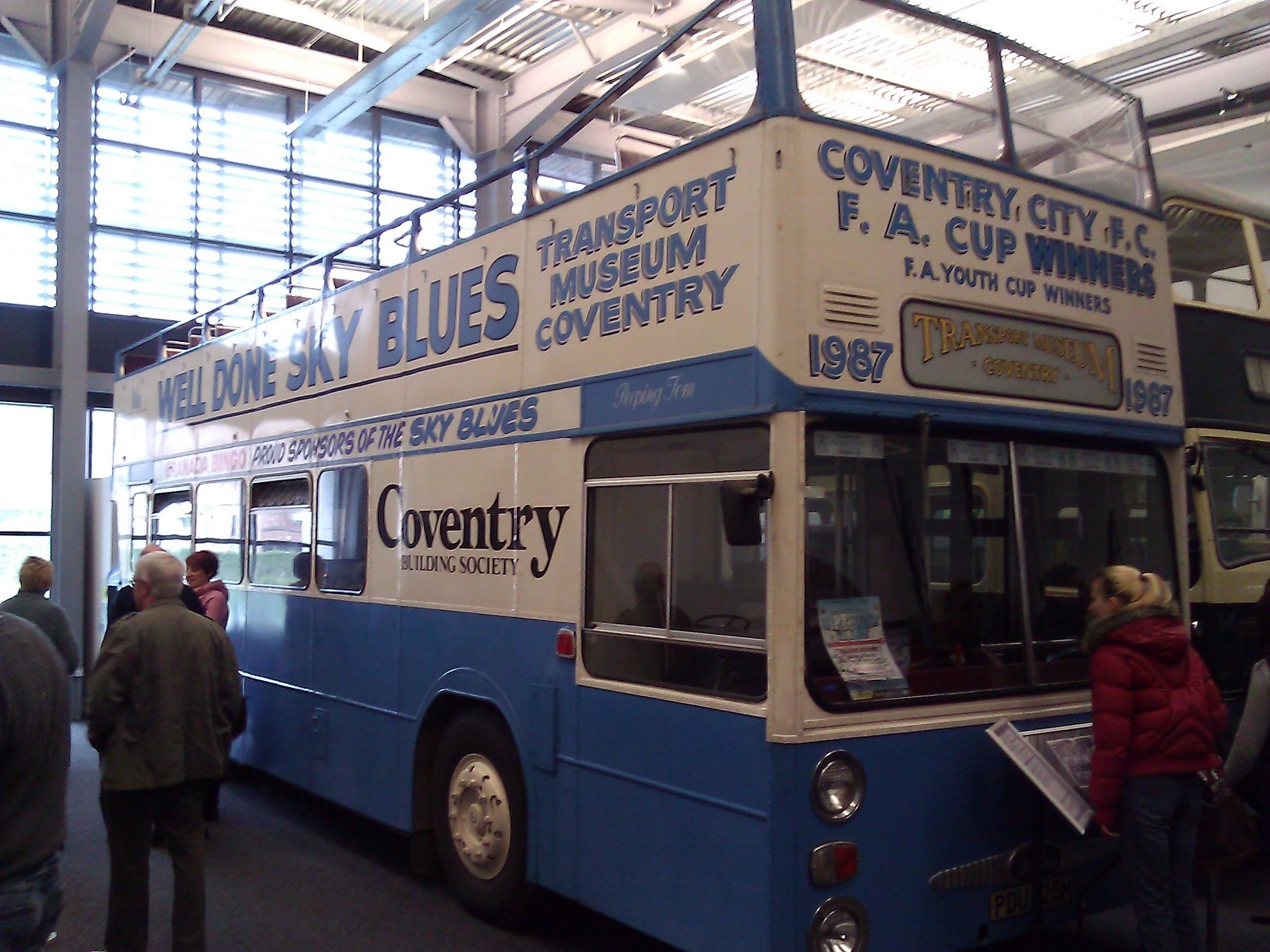
This bus is a 1973 Daimler Fleetline CRG6LX, bodied by East Lancs initially from Coventry Corporation Transport, in which the victorious Coventry players paraded the cup through the city after their victory. It is now on display in the Coventry Transport Museum.

Sillett said he was confident that his side was going to win but was humble in victory: "The longer the game went on, the more certain I was that we were going to win it ... But there should be credit all round here. We saw two sides trying to play attacking football as we both showed the best of the English game." His counterpart Pleat bemoaned not capitalising on the 2–1 lead his side held but was gracious in defeat: "We were in a lovely position at half-time. A third goal for us would have killed it ... In the end I thought they deserved to finish in front. We were stretched and they might have scored more. But we contributed to a fair game." Pleat suggested that "a couple of our players did not do what they have been doing or are capable of doing. The players who did not quite get to grips with it know who they are." It was Hoddle's last game for the club before he moved to AS Monaco.

Clive Allen scored his 49th goal of the season for Tottenham in the final which, as of 2021, remains a club record. His scoring exploits earned him the FWA Footballer of the Year and the PFA Players' Player of the Year awards. Mabbutt became the third person to score both for and against his own club in an FA Cup final, the others being Bert Turner of Charlton Athletic in 1946 and Tommy Hutchison of Manchester City in 1981. Tottenham had been knocked out of the Football League Cup in the semi-finals by North London rivals and eventual winners Arsenal and had finished third in the league, and so, having spent most of the season challenging for an unprecedented domestic treble, they ended it with no major trophies at all.

The day after the match, Coventry paraded the trophy on an open-top bus tour of the city. Around 250,000 people celebrated along the route from Hinckley Road to Speakers' Corner, while the bells of the old Coventry Cathedral were rung for the first time in over a century following a recent renovation – earlier than the planned first ringing date of 25 May. Sillett praised the support saying "we expected a good response to our win but this is beyond our wildest dreams." Regis was also complimentary to the supporters, noting: "It is absolutely wonderful, the fans have been fantastic." The bus was already in the collection of the Coventry Transport Museum who had acquired the vehicle the previous year, and as of 2021 it remains as an exhibit in the museum.

Because English clubs were banned from taking part in European competition following the Heysel Stadium disaster in 1985, Coventry were disallowed from taking part in the 1987–88 European Cup Winners' Cup. Tottenham would also have qualified for Europe, securing a place in the 1987–88 UEFA Cup for finishing third in the league, but for the ban. The FA Cup win coincided with an attempt to resurrect the Anglo-Scottish Cup in 1987–88 as the Anglo Scottish Challenge Cup. It saw Coventry pitted with 1986–87 Scottish Cup winners St Mirren. However poor attendances at the first leg (a 1–1 draw at Highfield Road) meant that the revival was halted, and the second leg was never played.

== Legacy ==
The 1987 FA Cup Final is regarded by many pundits as one of the greatest finals in the history of the competition. In a 2020 article, Daily Telegraph sports reporter Luke Edwards ranked the match top of his list of ten greatest finals, ahead of the 1953 "Stanley Matthews" final. A similar assessment in 2020 by the staff of football magazine FourFourTwo placed the match in its top ten, as did a 2001 "tour around some of the greatest FA Cup finals" by BBC Sport. BBC TV commentator John Motson stated that it was "the finest Cup Final I've had the pleasure of commentating on". Houchen's header was awarded the BBC Goal of the Season for 1987. One of Coventry's fanzines is entitled Gary Mabbutt's Knee in commemoration of the deciding goal.
