= Ray Woods (footballer) =

English footballer (born 1965)

Personal information
- Full name: Raymond Guy Woods
- Date of birth: 7 June 1965 (age 61)
- Place of birth: Birkenhead, England
- Position: Winger

Senior career*
Years	Team	Apps	(Gls)
1982–1985	Tranmere Rovers	14	(2)
- Bangor City
- Runcorn
- Northwich Victoria
1985–1987	Caernarfon Town		
1987–1988	Colne Dynamoes		
1988–1991	Wigan Athletic	28	(3)
1991–1994	Coventry City	21	(1)
1993	→ Wigan Athletic (loan)	13	(0)
1994–1996	Shrewsbury Town	51	(1)
- Telford United
- Worcester City
- * Club domestic league appearances and goals

Raymond Guy Woods (born 7 June 1965) is an English former professional footballer who played as a winger in the Football League for Tranmere Rovers, Wigan Athletic, Coventry City and Shrewsbury Town.

== Career ==
Born in Birkenhead, Woods made his professional debut for Tranmere Rovers.

After being released by Tranmere, Woods dropped into non-league football, and had brief spells at Bangor City, Runcorn and Northwich Victoria before joining Caernarfon Town. He was a key player in the team which reached the third round of the 1986–87 FA Cup.

After a spell with Colne Dynamoes, Woods returned to professional football with Wigan Athletic. In January 1991, Woods played for Wigan in a FA Cup tie against First Division side Coventry City, and set up Latics equaliser to force a replay, which Wigan lost 0–1. He impressed in both games, persuading City manager Terry Butcher to sign Woods for a fee of £200,000 shortly afterwards.

Woods went on to play for Shrewsbury Town before finishing his career with Telford United and Worcester City.

After retiring as a player, Woods was appointed as a Youth Development Officer at Worcester City in 2001. He remained involved with the club's youth programme until 2010.
