= Brian Kilcline =

English footballer

Personal information
- Date of birth: 7 May 1962 (age 64)
- Place of birth: Nottingham, England
- Height: 6 ft 2 in (1.88 m)
- Position: Defender

Senior career*
Years	Team	Apps	(Gls)
1980–1984	Notts County	158	(9)
1984–1991	Coventry City	173	(28)
1991–1992	Oldham Athletic	8	(0)
1992–1994	Newcastle United	32	(0)
1994–1995	Swindon Town	17	(0)
1995–1997	Mansfield Town	50	(3)
1997–1998	Halifax Town	2	(2)
Total		440	(42)

International career
1982	England U21	2	(0)
- * Club domestic league appearances and goals

Brian Kilcline (born 7 May 1962) is an English former professional footballer. He played as a centre half for Notts County, Coventry City, Oldham Athletic, Newcastle United, Swindon Town, Mansfield Town and Halifax Town, and was famous for his long hair and moustache.

== Career ==
Kilcline captained Coventry City in the 1987 FA Cup Final at Wembley against Tottenham Hotspur. At the time it was thought that Kilcline was responsible for scoring an own goal to give Spurs a 2–1 lead in the 40th minute, but this goal was eventually credited to Gary Mabbutt. Kilcline and Mabbutt were to clash again in the second half when Kilcline brought down Mabbutt with a tackle. Kilcline was not cautioned by referee Neil Midgley but had to be replaced by substitute Graham Rodger just a minute before the end of normal time due to the injury he himself sustained in the clash. After Coventry's extra time winner (the match finished 3-2) Kilcline limped slowly up the Wembley steps to receive the trophy for the only time in Coventry's history.

In 1991, Kilcline joined newly promoted Oldham Athletic but his stay at the club was not to be a long one.

When Kevin Keegan became manager of Newcastle United in 1992, "Killer" Kilcline was his first signing, and was immediately installed as club captain. He became known for his hard tackling and aerial ability - he often would prefer a diving header to a volley, even for balls only half a metre off the ground. Keegan later remarked that Kilcline was "the most important signing" he had ever made for the club. This was echoed by fans, who considered him partially responsible for saving the club from relegation and possible bankruptcy.

During the 1993–94 season, he briefly played for Swindon Town in the Premier League.

== Personal life ==
Kilcline has been married to Lynn since 1994. As of 2017, the couple split their time between homes in Portugal and Holmfirth, where they own a number of rental properties.

== Honours ==
Coventry City

- FA Cup: 1986–87

Newcastle United

- Football League First Division: 1992–93
