= David Titterton =

English footballer

Personal information
- Date of birth: 25 September 1971 (age 55)
- Place of birth: Hatton, Warwickshire, England
- Position: Defender

Senior career*
Years	Team	Apps	(Gls)
1989–1991	Coventry City	2	(0)
1991–1993	Hereford United	51	(1)
1993–1995	Wycombe Wanderers	19	(1)
1995	Hednesford Town	5	(0)
- * Club domestic league appearances and goals

David Titterton (born 25 September 1971) is a former professional footballer who played in The Football League for Coventry City, Hereford United, Wycombe Wanderers.

== Honours ==
Wycombe Wanderers

- Football League Third Division play-offs: 1994
