= Howard Clark (footballer) =

English footballer

Personal information
- Full name: Howard William Clark
- Date of birth: 19 September 1968 (age 58)
- Place of birth: Coventry, England
- Height: 6 ft 0 in (1.83 m)
- Positions: Midfielder; defender

Youth career
- –: Wolverhampton Wanderers
- –: Coventry City

Senior career*
Years	Team	Apps	(Gls)
1986–1991	Coventry City	20	(1)
1991	→ Darlington (loan)	5	(0)
1991–1993	Shrewsbury Town	56	(0)
1993–1995	Hereford United	55	(7)
1995	Nuneaton Borough		
1995–1996	Crawley Town	16	(1)
1996	Hinckley Athletic		
- * Club domestic league appearances and goals

Howard William Clark (born 19 September 1968) is an English former footballer who made 136 appearances in the Football League playing for Coventry City, Darlington, Shrewsbury Town and Hereford United. A midfielder or defender, Clark went on to play non-league football for Nuneaton Borough, Crawley Town and Hinckley Athletic.

== Life and career ==
Clark was born in Coventry. He was associated as a junior with Wolverhampton Wanderers, and joined hometown club Coventry City under the YTS scheme. He turned professional in September 1986, and was a member of the Coventry squad that won the 1986–87 FA Youth Cup. He made his first-team debut at the age of 20, on 5 November 1988, playing the whole of a 1–1 draw at home to West Ham United in the First Division, but never established himself in the first team. He made 20 League appearances over three years, and spent a few weeks on loan at Darlington of the Third Division, before moving to another Third Division club, Shrewsbury Town, on a free transfer in December 1991.

At the end of his first season, Shrewsbury were relegated to the fourth tier, renamed Third Division after the Premier League split from the Football League. He stayed for a season at the lower level, and made 56 league appearances in all. In the 1993 close season, he signed for Third Division Hereford United, where he played under the management of Greg Downs who had been a teammate at Coventry. In his first season, he appeared regularly, but less so in 1994–95, at the end of which he left the club for Southern League football with, successively, Nuneaton Borough, Crawley Town and Hinckley Athletic.

He retired from football in 1996 and joined the West Midlands Police.
