= Lee Hurst (footballer) =

English footballer

Personal information
- Full name: Lee Jason Hurst
- Date of birth: 21 September 1970 (age 56)
- Place of birth: Nuneaton, England
- Height: 6 ft 0 in (1.83 m)
- Position: Midfielder

Senior career*
Years	Team	Apps	(Gls)
1990–1996	Coventry City	49	(2)
1998	Charleston Battery	14	(0)
- * Club domestic league appearances and goals

Lee Hurst (born 21 September 1970) is an English retired footballer who played as a midfielder.

Hurst spent his whole English professional career at Coventry City, making his debut at the age of 20 on 2 February 1991 when they lost 1–0 to Wimbledon in the Football League First Division at Plough Lane. He made three more league appearances that season and 10 the following season before playing 35 times for the Sky Blues (scoring two goals) in the 1992-93 campaign when they were inaugural members of the Premier League and finished 15th. He was issued with the number 8 shirt when squad numbers were introduced for the 1993-94 season but a knee injury suffered in an off-the-field training exercise at the end of the previous season meant that he never appeared in that shirt. He finally retired in 1996, three years on, having failed to recover from the injury.

In 1998, he made a football comeback by appearing 14 times for the American side Charleston Battery.
