= Dean Emerson =

English footballer (born 1962)

Personal information
- Full name: Dean Emerson
- Date of birth: 27 December 1962 (age 63)
- Place of birth: Salford, England
- Height: 5 ft 10 in (1.78 m)
- Position: Midfielder

Senior career*
Years	Team	Apps	(Gls)
19??–1982	East Manchester		
1982–1985	Stockport County	156	(7)
1985–1986	Rotherham United	55	(8)
1986–1992	Coventry City	114	(0)
1992–1993	Hartlepool United	45	(1)
1993–1994	Stockport County	11	(0)
1994–1995	Preston North End	2	(0)
1995–199?	Chorley		
199?–1998	VS Rugby		
1998	Hinckley United		
1998–????	Stafford Rangers		
- * Club domestic league appearances and goals

Dean Emerson (born 27 December 1962) is an English former professional footballer who made 383 appearances in the Football League playing as a midfielder for Stockport County (167 league matches in two spells), Rotherham United, Coventry City (114 top-flight matches), Hartlepool United and Preston North End. He also played non-league football for East Manchester, Chorley, VS Rugby, Hinckley United and Stafford Rangers.

He was a Coventry City player when they reached the 1987 FA Cup Final but missed the match because of injury.
