= Keith Thompson (footballer) =

English footballer

Keith Thompson (born 24 April 1965) is an English former professional footballer who played as a winger. He was born in Birmingham, and is the younger brother of another professional footballer, Garry Thompson. In his career he played in England, Spain & Hong Kong.

== Career ==
- (England) Coventry City FC (1982–85) 12 apps 0 goals
- (England) Wimbledon FC (loan) (1983) 3 apps 0 goals
- (England) Northampton Town FC (loan) (1984) 10 apps 1 goals
- (Spain) Real Oviedo (1986–88) 69 apps 9 goals
- (England) Coventry City FC (1988–90) 11 apps 1 goal
- (Spain) Real Avilés Industrial (1990–91) 6 apps 1 goal
- (Hong Kong) Ernest Borel (1991–93)
- (Sweden) Vasalunds IF (1993) 11 apps 3 goals
- (Hong Kong) Voicelink (1993-1994) 2 goals
- (Spain) CD Toledo (1994–95) 22 apps 2 goals
