= Greg Downs =

English footballer and manager (born 1958)

Personal information
- Date of birth: 13 December 1958 (age 67)
- Place of birth: Carlton, England
- Height: 5 ft 9 in (1.75 m)
- Position: Full-back

Senior career*
| Years | Team | Apps | (Gls) |
| 1976–1985 | Norwich City | 169 | (8) |
| 1977 | → Connecticut Bicentennials (loan) | 16 | (1) |
| 1977 | → Torquay United (loan) | 1 | (1) |
| 1985–1990 | Coventry City | 146 | (4) |
| 1990–1991 | Birmingham City | 17 | (0) |
| 1991–1994 | Hereford United | 108 | (2) |
| 1994 | Raunds Town | | |
| 1994 | Kettering Town | 0 | (0) |
| 1994 | Redditch United | | |
| 1994–1995 | Merthyr Tydfil | 8 | (0) |
| 1995 | Worcester City | | |
| 1995–1996 | Forest Green Rovers | | |
| 1996? | Bridgnorth Town | | |
| 1997? | Malvern Town | | |
| 1997 | Merthyr Tydfil | | |
| 1997–2001 | Great Yarmouth Town | | |
| 2001–2002 | Mulbarton United | | |
| 2002–2003 | Blofield United | | |
| 2003 | Dereham Town | | |
| 2003–2004 | North Walsham Town | | |
| Total | | 457 | (16) |

Managerial career
- 1992–1994: Hereford United
- * Club domestic league appearances and goals

Gregory Downs (born 13 December 1958) is an English former professional footballer. Originally a centre-forward, he switched to left full-back early in his career.

Downs began his career with Norwich City where he was player of the year in 1982, the year they won promotion to the First Division a year after relegation.

He remained at Carrow Road until 1985, when moved to Coventry City where he won an FA Cup winner's medal in the 1987 final, where they achieved a surprise 3–2 win over Tottenham Hotspur. He spent five years at Highfield Road, playing 146 league games and scoring four goals.

On leaving in 1990, he dropped down to the Third Division to sign for Birmingham City, playing 17 times in the disappointing 1990–91 campaign where the Blues recorded their lowest ever finish of 13th place. He was then signed by Hereford United, who had appointed former Coventry boss John Sillett as manager for the 1991–92 season. Sillett left Edgar Street after one disappointing season in charge, and Downs was appointed player-manager in his place, an arrangement which lasted for two seasons until he was succeeded by John Layton. In three seasons at the Bulls, he played 108 times in the league's basement division, scoring twice.

After retiring from professional football in 1995, Downs joined the police. However, he continued playing non-league football into his mid forties.

In 2006, he joined Wroxham as assistant to player-manager Damian Hilton. The pair resigned in November 2007; though Hilton had second thoughts and was re-appointed manager, Downs left the club.

== Honours ==
Coventry City

- FA Cup: 1986–87
