= Tony Dobson =

English footballer

Personal information
- Full name: Anthony John Dobson
- Date of birth: 5 February 1969 (age 57)
- Place of birth: Coventry
- Height: 6 ft 1 in (1.85 m)
- Position: Left back

Senior career*
Years	Team	Apps	(Gls)
1986–1991	Coventry	54	(1)
1991–1993	Blackburn	41	(1)
1993–1997	Portsmouth	53	(2)
1994–1995	→ Oxford (loan)	5	(0)
1996	→ Peterborough (loan)	4	(0)
1997–1998	West Brom	11	(1)
1998	Gillingham	2	(0)
1998–2000	Northampton	12	(1)
2000–2001	Forest Green Rovers	2	(1)
- * Club domestic league appearances and goals

Anthony Dobson (born 5 February 1969 in Coventry) is an English retired professional footballer who played in the Football League & Premier League.

== Club career ==
=== Coventry City ===
Anthony Dobson started his professional career at Coventry City at the age of 8. He officially signed on 7 July 1986. He made 54 league appearances, scoring 1 goal.

=== Blackburn Rovers ===
He was transferred to Blackburn Rovers There he made 41 league appearances during his two-year stint.

=== Portsmouth ===
He was transferred to Portsmouth on 22 September 1993, for a transfer fee £150,000. There he made 53 league appearances, scoring 1 goal. He also had loan spells with Oxford United and Peterborough United.

== Management career ==
In 2001, he became the manager of Rugby Town (then called Rugby United). In 2005, he left Rugby Town to become the manager of Solihull Borough. He left the post in 2006, but then began his second spell in charge of Rugby Town, signing a new contract on 16 September 2008.
