= John Sillett =

English footballer and manager (1936–2021)

Personal information
- Full name: John Charles Sillett
- Date of birth: 20 July 1936
- Place of birth: Southampton, England
- Date of death: 30 November 2021 (aged 85)
- Position: Full back

Youth career
- 1953–1954: Southampton

Senior career*
Years	Team	Apps	(Gls)
1954–1962	Chelsea	93	(0)
1962–1966	Coventry City	109	(1)
1966–1968	Plymouth Argyle	38	(1)
Total		240	(2)

Managerial career
- 1974–1978: Hereford United
- 1986–1990: Coventry City
- 1991–1992: Hereford United
- * Club domestic league appearances and goals

John Charles Sillett (20 July 1936 – 30 November 2021) was an English football player and manager. He played for Chelsea, Coventry City and Plymouth Argyle. He won the Championship with Chelsea in 1955, playing alongside his brother Peter Sillett. He was manager of Coventry City from 1986 until 1990, winning the FA Cup in 1987, and also had two spells as manager of Hereford United.

== Early life ==
John Sillett was born in Southampton, Hampshire, on 20 July 1936. His father, Charlie Sillett, was a footballer, playing for Southampton between 1931 and 1938. His older brother, Peter Sillett, was also a footballer.

== Playing career ==
John and Peter Sillett both followed their father in signing for Southampton, although John never played for the first team. The brothers moved on to Chelsea as teenagers, where Peter won the First Division title in 1954–55. John made his Chelsea debut in 1957 and played over 100 games for Chelsea, scoring once. Sillett left Chelsea after the arrival of Tommy Docherty as manager, joining Coventry City in June 1962, who were at the time being managed by Jimmy Hill. Sillett helped Coventry to win the Third Division title in 1963–64, but his playing days were limited after suffering a back problem. In July 1966, he joined Plymouth Argyle, where he ended his playing career.

== Managerial career ==
=== Hereford United ===
After retirement from playing, Sillett moved into coaching. He was appointed Bristol City youth coach in 1968 under manager Alan Dicks, a former Chelsea and Coventry colleague, and took the team to the FA Youth Cup semi-finals. From 1970 to 1974, Sillett was first team coach and played a significant part in the development of the team which went on to achieve promotion to the top flight in 1976. In June 1974, he was appointed manager of Hereford United.

During Sillett's first season, Hereford finished in a mid-table position, an improvement on the previous season's 18th place. In 1975–76, the team won the Third Division title, with the prolific Dixie McNeil scoring 35 goals. A year later they were relegated, having won only eight matches and finishing bottom of the Second Division. Sillett initially stayed on as manager, but resigned in February 1978.

=== Coventry City ===
Jimmy Hill invited Sillett to join the Coventry coaching staff in 1979. He left the club in 1984 after a falling-out with manager Bobby Gould, but returned in 1985 under Gould's successor, Don Mackay. When Mackay departed in 1986 with just three games of the season left, Sillett was appointed chief coach alongside George Curtis. They managed two wins and avoided relegation on the final day of the season.

Sillett was appointed Coventry's first-team coach for the 1986–87 season, with Curtis receiving the title of managing director; That season, the club went on to reach the 1987 FA Cup Final against Tottenham Hotspur at Wembley, winning the game 3–2. TV commentator John Motson is quoted as saying it was "the most exciting FA Cup final on which I've had the pleasure of commentating".

Sillett became Coventry's sole manager from the 1987–88 season onwards, while Curtis returned to working on matters not related to the day-to-day running of the team. Sillett bought David Speedie from Chelsea for £780,000, a club-record at the time, announcing that the club would "no longer be shopping at Woolworths, from now on we're shopping at Harrods". The club were unable to participate in the European Cup Winners' Cup as English clubs were still banned from European competition following the 1985 Heysel Stadium disaster. The 1987–88 season began with another trip to Wembley, as Coventry played league-champions Everton in the FA Charity Shield. 40,000 Coventry supporters attended the game, which Sillett's team lost 1–0. The first league game was a repeat of the FA Cup final, as Coventry played Tottenham, Speedie scoring in a 2–1 win. The season was a disappointment, however, with their defence of the FA Cup ending in a fourth-round home defeat to Watford and another tenth-place league finish. The following season City suffered one of the biggest upsets in FA Cup history, as they lost 2–1 to non-league Sutton United in the third round. They fared better in the league and were third in the table following a win over league-leaders Arsenal in late February. They eventually finished seventh, which was their highest finish since 1978.

Coventry replaced a number of players during the 1989 close-season, buying defender Peter Billing and acquiring Liverpool's Kevin MacDonald on a free transfer, with David Phillips and Steve Sedgley leaving the club. Despite a strong start, which saw the side top of the table after four games, City struggled to score goals and finished twelfth in the table. They suffered another embarrassing FA Cup defeat, this time to Third Division Northampton, but fared better in the League Cup, reaching the semi-final with a 5–0 win over Sunderland before losing to eventual winners Nottingham Forest in the semi-final. With club record signing Kevin Gallacher (£900,000) starting to settle in to the frenetic style of the English top flight game, Sillett believed the club could challenge for the league title in 1990–91. The season started slowly, however, and Sillett was sacked by Chairman John Poynton, and replaced by Terry Butcher, who arrived from Rangers as player-manager, for a £400,000 fee. In his four full seasons in charge, Coventry's league placings were tenth, tenth, seventh and twelfth.

=== Later career ===
In 1991, Sillett returned to Hereford as manager, but left at the end of his first full season. This was his last major involvement with football, although he did some scouting work for the England national team under Sven-Göran Eriksson. He also worked with Central TV as a pundit for their football coverage.

== Death ==
Sillett died in the morning of 30 November 2021, at the age of 85.

== Honours ==
=== Player ===
Chelsea

- Football League First Division: 1954–55

Coventry City

- Football League Third Division: 1963–64

=== Manager ===
Coventry City

- FA Cup: 1986–87

Hereford United

- Football League Third Division: 1975–76

== Bibliography ==
- Brassington, David (1989). Singers to Sky Blues: The story of Coventry City Football Club (2 ed.). Buckingham: Sporting and Leisure Press Limited. ISBN 9780860234524.
- Brown, Jim (1998). Coventry City: The Elite Era : a Complete Record. Westcliff-on-Sea: Desert Island Books. ISBN 978-1-874287-03-2.
- Dean, Rod (1991). Coventry City: a complete record, 1883-1991. Derby: Breedon Books. ISBN 9780907969884.
