= Micky Gynn =

English footballer (born 1961)

Personal information
- Full name: Michael Gynn
- Date of birth: 19 August 1961 (age 65)
- Place of birth: Peterborough, England
- Height: 1.65 m (5 ft 5 in)
- Position: Midfielder

Youth career
- 1975–1979: Peterborough United

Senior career*
Years	Team	Apps	(Gls)
1979–1983	Peterborough United	156	(33)
1983–1993	Coventry City	241	(32)
1993–1995	Stoke City	21	
1995–1996	Corby Town		
–	Hednesford Town		
–	Wisbech Town		
Total		418	(65)
- * Club domestic league appearances and goals

Michael Gynn (born 19 August 1961) is an English former footballer who played as a midfielder in the Football League for Peterborough United, Coventry City and Stoke City.

== Career ==
Gynn began his career with his hometown club, Peterborough United, where he scored 39 goals from 188 appearances in all competitions, before joining First Division club Coventry City for a fee of £60,000. He spent ten years and accumulated almost 300 appearances at the club, with whom he won the FA Cup in 1987.

Gynn then moved on to Stoke City in August 1993 where he played in 29 matches in the 1993–94 season before retiring. He became a postman in the Coventry area, and works as a match statistician for the Press Association. In 2005, Gynn held his testimonial match at Coventry City's former ground of Highfield Road, the penultimate game played there before its demolition.

== Career statistics ==
Club	Season	League			FA Cup		League Cup		Other^{[A]}		Total	
Club	Season	Division	Apps	Goals	Apps	Goals	Apps	Goals	Apps	Goals	Apps	Goals
Peterborough United	1978–79	Third Division	11	2	0	0	0	0	0	0	11	2
Peterborough United	1979–80	Fourth Division	27	1	0	0	6	0	0	0	33	1
Peterborough United	1980–81	Fourth Division	29	7	6	0	0	0	0	0	35	7
Peterborough United	1981–82	Fourth Division	46	6	3	0	2	0	4	2	55	8
Peterborough United	1982–83	Fourth Division	43	17	4	3	4	1	3	0	54	21
Peterborough United	Total		156	33	13	3	12	1	7	2	188	39
Coventry City	1983–84	First Division	23	2	3	0	2	0	0	0	28	2
Coventry City	1984–85	First Division	39	4	2	0	2	0	0	0	43	4
Coventry City	1985–86	First Division	12	1	0	0	2	0	1	0	14	1
Coventry City	1986–87	First Division	20	5	4	2	3	0	1	0	28	7
Coventry City	1987–88	First Division	25	3	2	0	3	2	3	1	33	6
Coventry City	1988–89	First Division	8	1	0	0	2	3	0	0	10	4
Coventry City	1989–90	First Division	34	3	1	0	6	1	1	1	42	5
Coventry City	1990–91	First Division	35	8	4	2	5	1	0	0	44	11
Coventry City	1991–92	First Division	23	3	1	0	1	0	0	0	25	3
Coventry City	1992–93	Premier League	20	2	1	0	0	0	0	0	21	2
Coventry City	Total		241	32	18	4	26	7	6	2	291	45
Stoke City	1993–94	First Division	21	0	0	0	4	0	4	0	29	0
Career Total			418	65	31	7	38	8	17	4	504	84

A. The "Other" column constitutes appearances and goals in the Anglo-Italian Cup, FA Charity Shield, Football League Group Cup, Football League Trophy and Full Members' Cup.

== Honours ==
Coventry City

- FA Cup: 1986–87
