= List of Coventry City F.C. managers =

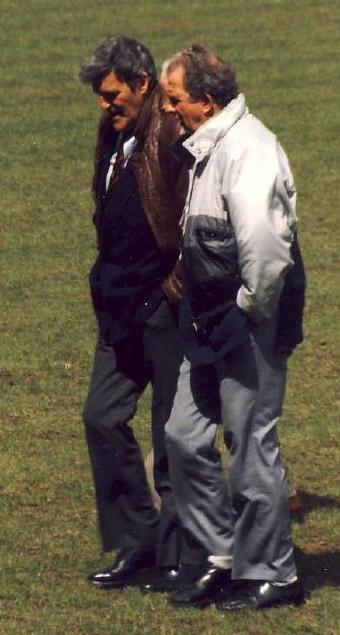
Jimmy Hill, manager 1961–1967, during which time Coventry City got promoted twice

The following is a list of managers of Coventry City Football Club and their major honours from the beginning of the club's official managerial records in 1883 to the present day.

The most successful person to manage Coventry City, to date, is Jimmy Hill, who guided The Sky Blues to become champions of Second Division and Third Division. The club's longest-serving manager is Harry Storer, who had two spells managing the club from 1931 to 1945 and from 1948 to 1953, totalling 19 years and 1 month.

== Manager records and statistics ==
Information correct as of match played 2 May 2026.
Only competitive matches are counted.
Caretaker managers are not included in this list.

Name	Nationality	From	To	P	W	D	L	Win% (Note: Win% is rounded to two decimal places)	Honours	Ref
William Stanley	England	1883	1885							
Harry Hathaway	England	1885	1887							
J.G. Morgan	England	1887	1892							
Teddy Kirk	England	1893	1893							
George Maley	England	1893	1893							
Joe Collins	England	1893	1895							
Tom Cashmore	England	1895	1900							
Ben Newhall	England	1900	1902							
Michael O'Shea	Ireland	1902	1905							
Joe Beaman	England	1905	1908							
Walter Harris	England	1908	1909							
Harry Buckle	Northern Ireland	1909	1910							
Robert Wallace & committee	England	1910	1913							
Frank Scott-Walford & committee	England	1913	1915							
William Clayton	England	January 1917	October 1919	11	0	2	9	0.00		
Harry Pollitt	England	October 1919	June 1920	44	9	12	23	20.45		
Albert Evans	England	June 1920	November 1924	181	54	44	83	29.83		
James Kerr	Scotland	July 1925	February 1928	157	51	28	78	32.48		
Jimmy McIntyre	England	June 1928	February 1931	118	47	29	42	39.83		
Harry Storer	England	June 1931	June 1945	354	167	79	108	47.18	1 Tier 3 promotion 1 Tier 3 cup win	
Dick Bayliss	England	June 1945	April 1947	30	10	10	10	33.33		
Billy Frith	England	June 1947	November 1948	76	27	19	30	35.53		
Harry Storer (2)	England	November 1948	November 1953	230	88	49	93	38.26		
Jack Fairbrother	England	January 1954	October 1954	37	15	7	15	40.54		
Jesse Carver	England	June 1955	December 1955	72	27	16	29	37.50		
George Raynor	England	January 1956	June 1956	19	6	5	8	31.58		
Harry Warren	England	June 1956	September 1957	50	17	13	20	34.00		
Billy Frith (2)	England	September 1957	November 1961	211	84	53	74	39.81	1 Tier 4 promotion 1 Southern cup win	
Jimmy Hill	England	December 1961	May 1967	282	125	82	75	44.33	1 Tier 3 promotion 1 Tier 2 promotion	
Noel Cantwell	Ireland	October 1967	March 1972	213	69	61	83	32.39		
Joe Mercer	England	15 June 1972	1 May 1974	102	36	24	42	35.29		
Gordon Milne	England	June 1974	May 1981	436	150	121	165	34.40	1 League Cup semi final	
Dave Sexton	England	May 1981	May 1983	96	30	24	42	31.25		
Bobby Gould	England	31 May 1983	28 December 1984	72	21	18	33	29.17		
Don Mackay	Scotland	December 1984	12 April 1986	67	22	12	33	32.84		
John Sillett; 1986–1987 with George Curtis	England	12 April 1986	14 November 1990	206	84	52	70	40.78	1 FA Cup win 1 League Cup semi final	
Terry Butcher	England	15 November 1990	6 January 1992	60	20	14	26	33.33		
Bobby Gould (2)	England	1 July 1992	23 October 1993	59	18	19	22	30.51		
Phil Neal	England	23 October 1993	14 February 1995	68	21	20	27	30.88		
Ron Atkinson	England	15 February 1995	5 November 1996	74	19	27	28	25.68		
Gordon Strachan	Scotland	5 November 1996	10 September 2001	215	70	56	89	32.56		
Roland Nilsson	Sweden	11 September 2001	16 April 2002	43	19	6	18	44.19		
Gary McAllister	Scotland	24 April 2002	12 January 2004	76	21	26	29	27.63		
Eric Black	Scotland	15 January 2004	4 May 2004	22	10	4	8	45.45		
Peter Reid	England	5 June 2004	6 January 2005	31	10	8	13	32.26		
Micky Adams	England	23 January 2005	17 January 2007	99	33	26	40	33.33		
Iain Dowie	Northern Ireland	19 February 2007	11 February 2008	49	20	8	21	40.82		
Chris Coleman	Wales	19 February 2008	4 May 2010	117	34	37	46	29.06		
Aidy Boothroyd	England	20 May 2010	14 March 2011	39	12	8	19	30.77		
Andy Thorn	England	28 April 2011	26 August 2012	54	10	18	26	18.52		
Mark Robins	England	19 September 2012	14 February 2013	33	17	6	10	51.52		
Steven Pressley	Scotland	8 March 2013	23 February 2015	100	32	30	38	32.00		
Tony Mowbray	England	3 March 2015	29 September 2016	76	26	24	26	34.21		
Russell Slade	England	21 December 2016	5 March 2017	16	3	5	8	18.75		
Mark Robins (2)	England	6 March 2017	7 November 2024	387	154	106	127	39.79	1 EFL Trophy win 1 Tier 4 promotion 1 Tier 3 promotion 1 FA Cup semi final	
Frank Lampard	England	28 November 2024	Present	82	45	17	20	54.88	1 Tier 2 promotion	

=== Most games managed ===
	Manager	Games	Years
1	(England) Harry Storer	584	1931–1945, 1948–1953
2	(England) Gordon Milne	436	1974–1981
3	(England) Mark Robins	420	2012–2013, 2017–2024
4	(England) Billy Frith	287	1947–1948, 1957–1961
5	(England) Jimmy Hill	282	1961–1967
6	(Scotland) Gordon Strachan	214	1996–2001
7	(Republic of Ireland) Noel Cantwell	213	1967–1972
8	(England) John Sillett	206	1986–1990
9	(England) Albert Evans	181	1920–1924
10	(England) James Kerr	157	1925–1928
11	(England) Bobby Gould	131	1983–1984, 1992–1993
12	(England) Jimmy McIntyre	118	1928–1931
13	(Wales) Chris Coleman	117	2008–2010
14	(Scotland) Steven Pressley	100	2013–2015

=== Highest win percentages ===
	Manager	Win %	Games	Years
1	(England) Frank Lampard	54.88	82	2024–Present
2	(Scotland) Eric Black	45.45	22	2004
3	(England) Jimmy Hill	44.33	282	1961–1967
4	(Sweden) Roland Nilsson	44.19	43	2001–2002
5	(England) Harry Storer	43.66	584	1931–1945, 1948–1953
6	(Northern Ireland) Iain Dowie	40.82	49	2007–2008
7	(England) John Sillett	40.78	206	1986–1990
8	(England) Mark Robins	40.71	420	2012–2013, 2017–2024

=== Nationalities ===
	Country	Managers
1	England	42
2	Scotland	6
3	Ireland	2
3	Northern Ireland	2
5	Sweden	1
5	Wales	1

== Caretaker manager statistics ==
Information correct as of match played 28 November 2024.
Only competitive matches are counted.

Name	Nationality	From	To	P	W	D	L	Win% (Note: Win% is rounded to two decimal places)
H. Howard & committee	England	1915	1917					
Harry Harbourne	England	1924	1925					
Bill Slade	England	1931	1931					
Charlie Elliott	England	1954	1955					
Bob Dennison	England	1972	1972					
Don Howe	England	6 January 1992	1 July 1992	20	3	8	9	15.00
Steve Ogrizovic & Trevor Peake	England	16 April 2002	24 April 2002	1	0	0	1	0.00
Steve Ogrizovic (2)	England	4 May 2004	6 May 2004	0	0	0	0	—
Adrian Heath	England	6 January 2005	23 January 2005	3	1	0	2	33.33
Adrian Heath (2)	England	17 January 2007	19 February 2007	5	1	1	3	20.00
Frankie Bunn & John Harbin	England & Australia	11 February 2008	19 February 2008	2	0	1	1	0.00
Steve Harrison	England	4 May 2010	20 May 2010	0	0	0	0	—
Steve Harrison (2) & Andy Thorn	England	14 March 2011	28 April 2011	8	3	3	2	37.50
Richard Shaw & Lee Carsley	England & Ireland	26 August 2012	19 September 2012	6	1	1	4	16.67
Lee Carsley (2)	Ireland	14 February 2013	8 March 2013	5	3	0	2	60.00
Neil MacFarlane & Dave Hockaday	Scotland & England	23 February 2015	3 March 2015	2	1	0	1	50.00
Mark Venus	England	29 September 2016	21 December 2016	18	8	2	8	44.44
Rhys Carr	Wales	7 November 2024	28 November 2024	3	0	2	1	0.00
