= List of Walsall F.C. managers =

The following is a list of Walsall managers from the founding of Walsall Football Club in 1888 until the present day. The list includes only managers who were in charge permanently and does not include any temporary caretaker managers. The club has been served by 48 different permanently appointed managers, all of them born in the United Kingdom, aside from former Denmark international Jan Sørensen (1997–98).

From 1888 to 1920, the team was selected by a committee whose secretary had the same powers and role as a manager has today. There are ten known secretaries from this period, although there is a gap in the history books from 1901 to 1908. The dates for appointment of these should be taken only as approximate, although the years should be correct. In 1920, as was becoming the norm across all football clubs, Walsall broke from this tradition and appointed player Albert Groves as the club's first official manager.

The club's longest serving and, arguably, most-successful manager is Bill Moore who took charge of 470 matches over two spells from 1957–63 and 1969–72. During his first spell he took the team from languishing towards the bottom of the Third Division South to their highest ever post-war league position of 14th in the Second Division in 1962.

Only five managers have achieved promotion for the club since Bill Moore: Alan Buckley in 1979–80, Tommy Coakley in 1987–88, Chris Nicholl in 1994–95, Ray Graydon in 1998–99 and 2000–01, and Richard Money in 2006–07.

== Managers ==
Only competitive first team matches are counted. Wins, losses and draws are results at the final whistle; the results of penalty shoot-outs are not counted. Correct as of match on 22 October 2024.

Name	From	To	P	W	D	L	Win%	Honours	Notes
(England) H. Smallwood ^{sec}	1 Aug 1888	1 Aug 1891	69	32	9	28	46.38		
(England) A. G. Burton ^{sec}	1 Aug 1891	1 Aug 1893	49	15	6	28	30.61		
(England) J. H. Robinson ^{sec}	1 Aug 1893	1 Aug 1895	62	22	3	37	35.48		
(England) C. H. Aislo ^{sec}	1 Aug 1895	1 Aug 1896	31	19	6	6	61.29		
(England) A. E. Parsloe ^{sec}	1 Aug 1896	1 Aug 1897	33	12	5	16	36.36		
(England) Louis Ford ^{sec}	1 Aug 1897	1 Aug 1898	31	12	5	14	38.71		
(England) G. Hughes ^{sec}	1 Aug 1898	1 Aug 1899	35	15	12	8	42.86		
(England) Louis Ford ^{sec}	1 Aug 1899	1 Aug 1901	79	25	24	30	31.65		(Note: Louis Ford's second spell in charge after 1897–88.)
(England) J. E. Shutt ^{sec}	1 Aug 1908	1 Jul 1912	192	117	28	47	60.94		
(Wales) Haydn Price ^{sec}	1 Jul 1912	1 Aug 1915	114	57	19	38	50.00		
(England) Joe Burchell ^{sec}	1 Aug 1915	1 May 1920	56	20	12	24	35.71		
(Wales) Albert Groves ^{p}	1 May 1920	1 Aug 1921	36	19	6	11	52.78		
(England) Joe Burchell	1 Aug 1921	1 Feb 1926	201	74	36	91	36.82		(Note: Joe Burchell's second spell in charge after being secretary-manager 1915–20.)
(Republic of Ireland) David Ashworth	1 Feb 1926	1 Feb 1927	42	16	9	17	38.10		
(Scotland) Jimmy Torrance	1 Feb 1927	1 May 1928	59	17	12	30	28.81		
(Scotland) James Kerr	1 May 1928	1 Apr 1929	44	15	13	16	34.09		
(England) Sid Scholey	1 Apr 1929	1 Oct 1930	59	19	9	31	32.20		
(Scotland) Peter O'Rourke	1 Oct 1930	1 Feb 1932	62	21	11	30	33.87		
(England) Bill Slade	1 Feb 1932	1 Oct 1934	117	55	23	39	47.01		
(Scotland) Andrew Wilson	1 Oct 1934	1 Apr 1937	130	47	30	53	36.15	Third Division North Cup runners-up 1935	
(England) Tommy Lowes	1 Apr 1937	1 Sep 1939	102	32	21	49	31.37		
(England) Sam Longmore	1 Sep 1939	5 Aug 1944	166	54	34	78	32.53		
(England) Harry Hibbs	5 Aug 1944	30 Jun 1951	305	113	73	119	37.05	Third Division South Cup runners-up 1946	
(Scotland) Tony McPhee	1 Jul 1951	1 Dec 1951	26	8	3	15	30.77		
(England) Brough Fletcher	1 Mar 1952	1 Apr 1953	59	10	11	38	16.95		
(England) Frank Buckley	1 Apr 1953	1 Sep 1955	105	23	26	56	21.90		
(Scotland) John Love	1 Sep 1955	1 Dec 1957	116	38	24	54	32.76		
(England) Bill Moore	1 Dec 1957	1 Nov 1963	283	121	60	102	42.76	Fourth Division champions 1959–60; Third Division runners-up 1960–61	
(England) Alf Wood	1 Nov 1963	1 Oct 1964	43	10	9	24	23.26		
(England) Ray Shaw	1 Oct 1964	1 Mar 1968	179	79	36	64	44.13		
(England) Dick Graham	1 Mar 1968	1 May 1968	15	6	4	5	40.00		
(England) Ron Lewin	1 Jul 1968	1 Feb 1969	37	11	12	14	29.73		
(England) Bill Moore	1 Feb 1969	16 Oct 1972	187	69	53	65	36.90		(Note: Bill Moore's second spell in charge after 1957–63.)
(England) John Smith	16 Oct 1972	23 Mar 1973	26	7	5	14	26.92		
(Scotland) Jimmy MacEwan	23 Mar 1973	1 Jun 1973	9	3	2	4	33.33		
(England) Ronnie Allen	6 Jun 1973	20 Dec 1974	26	6	9	11	23.08		
(Scotland) Doug Fraser	1 Jan 1974	7 Mar 1977	163	60	45	58	36.81		
(Scotland) Dave Mackay	9 Mar 1977	5 Aug 1978	72	30	27	15	41.67		
(England) Alan Ashman	23 Aug 1978	17 Feb 1979	27	8	6	13	29.63		
(England) Frank Sibley	1 Mar 1979	5 May 1979	19	2	6	11	10.53		
(England) Alan Buckley ^{p}	27 Jun 1979	1 Jul 1981	102	38	36	28	37.25	Fourth Division runners-up 1979–80	
(England) Alan Buckley ^{p} & (Scotland) Neil Martin	1 Jul 1981	1 Jan 1982	22	11	5	6	50.00		
(Scotland) Neil Martin	1 Jan 1982	1 May 1982	30	4	11	15	13.33		
(England) Alan Buckley ^{p}	1 May 1982	1 Jun 1986	225	99	51	75	44.00		(Note: Alan Buckley's second spell in charge after 1979–82.)
(Scotland) Tommy Coakley	1 Aug 1986	27 Dec 1988	148	62	37	49	41.89	Third Division play-off winners 1987–88	
(Republic of Ireland) John Barnwell	17 Jan 1989	1 Mar 1990	62	13	19	30	20.97		
(England) Paul Taylor	1 Mar 1990	15 May 1990	15	4	4	7	26.67		
(England) Kenny Hibbitt	16 May 1990	1 Aug 1994	213	72	57	84	33.80		
(Northern Ireland) Chris Nicholl	1 Aug 1994	21 May 1997	157	72	38	47	45.86	Third Division runners-up 1994–95	
(Denmark) Jan Sørensen	25 Jun 1997	5 May 1998	62	26	13	23	41.94		
(England) Ray Graydon	5 May 1998	22 Jan 2002	199	79	49	71	39.70	Second Division runners-up 1998–99; Second Division play-off winners 2000–01	
(England) Colin Lee	24 Jan 2002	16 Apr 2004	116	38	30	48	32.76		
(England) Paul Merson † ^{p}	16 Apr 2004	6 Feb 2006	94	32	23	39	34.04		
(England) Kevan Broadhurst	22 Feb 2006	24 Apr 2006	11	1	4	6	9.09		
(England) Richard Money	3 May 2006	22 Apr 2008	102	44	33	25	43.14	League Two champions 2006–07	
(England) Jimmy Mullen	22 Apr 2008	10 Jan 2009	29	10	5	14	34.48		
(England) Chris Hutchings	20 Jan 2009	4 Jan 2011	98	31	24	43	31.63		
(England) Dean Smith †	4 Jan 2011	30 Nov 2015	260	84	96	80	32.31	Football League Trophy runners-up 2015	
(Republic of Ireland) Sean O'Driscoll	18 Dec 2015	6 Mar 2016	16	6	5	5	37.50		
(England) Jon Whitney †	7 Mar 2016	12 Mar 2018	109	38	29	42	34.86		
(England) Dean Keates	16 Mar 2018	6 Apr 2019	60	18	13	29	30.00		
(England) Darrell Clarke	10 May 2019	15 Feb 2021	76	25	25	26	32.89		
(England) Brian Dutton	15 Feb 2021	10 May 2021	20	3	8	9	15.00		
(England) Matthew Taylor	19 May 2021	9 Feb 2022	36	9	10	17	25.00		
(Wales) Michael Flynn	15 Feb 2022	19 Apr 2023	68	21	22	25	30.88		
(England) Mat Sadler †	19 Apr 2023	11 Mar 2026	158	70	34	54	44.30		
(Jamaica) Darren Byfield †	18 Mar 2026	present	2	1	1	0	50.00		

Key
^{sec} Secretary-manager.
^{p} Player-manager.
† Served as caretaker manager before being appointed permanently.
