= Douglas King =

Douglas King may refer to:

- Douglas King (politician) (1877–1930), British naval commander and politician
- Doug King (drag racer) (1937–2011), American drag racer
- Doug King (businessman) (born 1967), British businessman and investor
