= Coventry City F.C. =

Association football club in England

Coventry City
- Full name: Coventry City Football Club
- Nickname: The Sky Blues
- Short name: Coventry; Cov
- Founded: 13 August 1883; 143 years ago (as Singers F.C.)
- Ground: Coventry Building Society Arena
- Capacity: 32,609
- Owner: Doug King
- Executive chairman: Doug King
- Head coach: Frank Lampard
- League: Premier League
- 2025–26: EFL Championship, 1st of 24 (promoted)
- Website: ccfc.co.uk
Home colours	Away colours	Third colours

Coventry City Football Club is a professional football club based in Coventry, West Midlands, England. The club competes in the Premier League, the top tier of English football. The club is nicknamed the Sky Blues after the sky blue colours that have featured prominently throughout their history, which they have worn continuously since 1962.

Coventry City formed as Singers F.C. in 1883 following a general meeting of the Singer Gentleman's club. They adopted their current name in 1898 and joined the Southern League in 1908, before being selected into the Football League in 1919. Relegated in 1925, they returned to the Second Division as champions of the Third Division South and Third Division South Cup winners in 1935–36. Relegated in 1952, they won promotion in the inaugural Fourth Division season in 1958–59. Coventry reached the First Division after winning the Third Division title in 1963–64 and the Second Division title in 1966–67 under the management of Jimmy Hill. In the 1970–71 season, the team competed in the European Inter-Cities Fairs Cup, reaching the second round. Despite beating Bayern Munich 2–1 in the home leg, they had lost 6–1 in the first leg in Germany, and were eliminated.

Coventry's first period in the top division lasted 34 consecutive seasons between 1967 and 2001, and the club were inaugural members of the Premier League in 1992. Following their relegation from the top flight in 2001, they dropped down to League One in 2012 and League Two in 2017. Coventry won the FA Cup in 1987, the club's only major trophy, beating Tottenham Hotspur 3–2 in the final. The club also won the EFL Trophy in 2017, in the same season that they were relegated to the fourth tier.

Coventry returned to Wembley in 2018, beating Exeter City in the League Two play-off final. Manager Mark Robins built on this success guiding the Sky Blues to eighth in League One the next season, and then led the club to promotion back to the EFL Championship as League One champions in 2020. In the 2022–23 season, Coventry secured a play-off place in the Championship, before losing the play-off final to Luton Town on penalties.

For 106 years from 1899 to 2005, Coventry City played at the Highfield Road ground. The 32,609-capacity Coventry Arena was opened in August 2005 to replace Highfield Road, but the club only used the stadium periodically during a long-running dispute over rent between 2013 and August 2025, when the club acquired the stadium outright.

Coventry City play in the 2026–27 Premier League after winning promotion, as champions, to return to the English top flight for the first time since the 2000–01 season.

== History ==
Chart of historic table positions of Coventry City in the Football League.

=== Early years (1883–1919) ===
Coventry City was founded in 1883 as Singers F.C., following a meeting between William Stanley and seven colleagues from the Singer Cycle Company at the Lord Aylesford Inn in Hillfields. It was one of several 19th century clubs linked to Coventry's bicycle factories, and the company founder George Singer was its first president. Singers joined the Birmingham County Football Association in 1884 and played about forty games in their first four years at Dowells Field in the Stoke area. In early seasons they lacked a regular playing staff and sometimes lacked equipment such as goal nets. In 1887, the club moved to the larger Stoke Road Ground, which had rudimentary stands, and they charged an entrance fee for the first time. The following five seasons were very successful, culminating in back-to-back Birmingham Junior Cup titles in 1891 and 1892.

Singers turned professional in 1892 and joined the Birmingham & District League in 1894, competing against strong reserve sides from established regional teams such as Aston Villa. Coventry residents not connected to the cycle company began supporting the club, and it was renamed Coventry City in 1898. Highfield Road opened in 1899, but its construction caused a financial crisis and subsequent salary disputes with the players. The club endured several poor seasons on the field, having to re-apply for membership of the league three times in the space of five years. In 1901, Coventry suffered their worst ever defeat with an 11–2 loss against Worcester-based Berwick Rangers in the qualifying round of the FA Cup. The club became a limited company in July 1907 and the team was more successful the following season, reaching the first round proper of the FA Cup for the first time before being eliminated by Crystal Palace.

In 1908, Coventry joined the Southern League, at the time the third-strongest English division. In their second season, Coventry reached the FA Cup quarter-final, beating top-flight teams Preston and Nottingham Forest before losing to Everton. Another two successful seasons followed but in 1914 the club was relegated, amid renewed financial problems. Its economic health worsened as attendances dropped sharply, and the club was in danger of dissolution. It was saved in part by the abandonment of competitive football in mid-1915 due to World War I. The club's debts were then paid off by benefactor David Cooke in 1917. During the war, they played some friendly matches against local clubs and joined a temporary wartime division for 1918–19.

=== League football and the "Old Five" (1919–1945) ===
In 1919, Coventry submitted a successful application to join the Football League and were placed into the Second Division for the 1919–20 season, the first played after the war. In preparation for league football, the club invested in new players and increased Highfield Road's capacity to 40,000. They avoided finishing last in 1919–20 when they won their final game against Bury, but this result was later found to be rigged, the club receiving a heavy fine in 1923. In 1924–25, after their sixth successive relegation battle, Coventry finished bottom of the table and dropped into the Third Division North. A year later they were asked by the League to switch to the Third Division South, to keep the sizes of the divisions even. Their poor form continued, and in 1927–28 they narrowly avoided having to seek re-election. Supporters rioted after the final game that season, some calling for the club to be wound up and a phoenix club established in its place. In 1928, the club's worst ever attendance was recorded with a gate of 2,059 for a match against Crystal Palace.

In addition to poor form on the field, the club ran into financial difficulties by the end of the 1920s, having to rely on fundraisers by supporters and a cash injection by Cooke, who had become club president. A committee of enquiry in 1928 concluded that the club was being mismanaged, leading to resignation of chairman W. Carpenter and his replacement by Walter Brandish. The club's form began to improve under the new board, and the appointment of Harry Storer as manager in 1931 brought in an era of success at the club. Coventry scored a total of 108 goals in the 1931–32 season, gaining the nickname "The Old Five" as a result of scoring five or more in many games. New signing Clarrie Bourton's individual tally of 49 goals was the Football League record for that season, and his overall total of 50 remains the club record. Two further 100-goal seasons followed, the first time in the league that a team had achieved three in a row, and Coventry recorded their largest ever league victory in April 1934, 9–0 against Bristol City. Despite scoring heavily, Coventry missed out on promotion every season until 1935–36, when they finished as Third Division North champions.

The club continued their good form in the second tier, finishing eighth, fourth and fourth again between 1936 and 1939. They also constructed a new main stand and purchased the freehold of Highfield Road, utilising a loan of £20,000 from local motor-industry entrepreneur John Siddeley. In 1937–38 they met with Midlands rivals Aston Villa the first time in league football, securing with a win and a draw in the two meetings as well as a higher-placed finish than the Birmingham club. In September 1939, the league season was aborted after three games due to the start of World War II. Many supporters at the time blamed the war for robbing the team of a probable imminent promotion to the First Division, although several top players including Bourton had been sold by 1939, and attendances had begun to fall. Coventry continued playing some friendly games until November 1940, when the Coventry Blitz damaged the stadium and brought all football in the city to a halt. Friendly matches resumed again in 1942, as parts of Highfield Road had been rebuilt, and the team joined the Midland Regional League.

=== Rise to the First Division, Europe, and FA Cup victory (1945–1987) ===
Storer left Coventry for Birmingham City after the war, and many of the 1939 squad had retired by 1945. New manager Dick Bayliss assembled a squad with a mixture of pre-war players and newcomers, but his tenure was cut short when he died after being stranded in a snow storm in 1947. Replacement Billy Frith was dismissed following a poor start to 1948–49 and the club persuaded Storer to return from Birmingham. In 1950–51, Coventry led the Second Division table at Christmas, but a poor run ended their promotion hopes and the following season they were relegated. They spent the next six seasons in the Third Division South, with seven different managers, but were never in contention for promotion. The average attendance at Highfield Road dropped sharply during this period, and several top players had to be sold amid financial difficulties. In 1958, the north and south divisions were replaced by a single nationwide third and a new fourth. Coventry were placed in the latter as a result of a bottom-half finish in 1957–58. Three games into 1958–59, the club occupied its lowest ever overall league position, 91st, but recovered to secure promotion back into the third tier.

The appointment of Derrick Robins as chairman in 1958 and Jimmy Hill as manager in 1961, marked the start of the "Sky Blue revolution" at the club. Hill changed the club's kit colour and nickname, introduced the "Sky Blue Song", and added pre-match entertainment. Backed by an injection of cash from Robins, Hill led Coventry to the Third and Second Division championships in 1964 and 1967 respectively, taking them to the top division for the first time. Coventry's record attendance was set in 1967, against fellow title-chasers Wolverhampton Wanderers; the official gate was 51,455 although the club estimated that the figure was higher. In 1969–70, under Hill's successor Noel Cantwell, the club finished sixth in the First Division, which as of 2022 remains their highest ever position. The top-six finish earned them a place in the 1970–71 Inter-Cities Fairs Cup, which ended in the second round with a 7–3 aggregate defeat against Bayern Munich. In the mid-1970s, the club faced renewed financial difficulty and sold several top players. A relegation battle followed in 1976–77, which culminated in a controversial 2–2 draw with Bristol City that saw both sides survive at the expense of Sunderland, playing out the final minutes without any attempt to score further goals. A season of success followed in 1977–78, as Coventry finished seventh, narrowly missing a European place. In 1980–81, Coventry reached their first major semi-final, losing to West Ham United in the League Cup.

Hill returned to the club as managing director in 1975, and was elevated to chairman in 1980. He initiated several transformations at the club, including the conversion of Highfield Road to England's first all-seat stadium in 1981, and the opening of a sports centre and training ground in Ryton-on-Dunsmore. Hill attempted to rename the club "Coventry Talbot", after their sponsors, but this was rejected by the Football Association. To pay for the developments, the club sold top players including popular striker Tommy Hutchison, and results suffered. Hill was forced out of the club in 1983 and terraces reintroduced two years later. Despite surviving relegation battles for four successive seasons, with three changes of manager, by 1986 the club had assembled a strong squad. Under duo George Curtis and John Sillett, they spent most of the following season in the top eight, and advanced to the 1987 FA Cup final. In a match later described by Steven Pye of The Guardian' as a "classic final", Coventry beat Tottenham Hotspur 3–2 at Wembley which, as of 2026, is the club's only major trophy to date.

=== Recent history (1987–present) ===
Coventry's FA Cup defence ended with a fourth-round defeat to Watford, followed a season later by one of the biggest upsets in FA Cup history when they lost 2–1 to non-league Sutton United in the third round. However, they finished seventh in the league that season, their highest finish since 1978. A last-day escape in 1991–92 earned Coventry a place in the newly-formed Premier League. Bryan Richardson took over as club chairman in summer 1993, making large sums of money available for players over subsequent years. With Ron Atkinson and then Gordon Strachan as manager, Coventry signed several high-profile players such as Dion Dublin, Moustapha Hadji, Peter Ndlovu and Robbie Keane, but did not finish higher than 11th place for the remainder of their Premier League tenure.

In 1997, Richardson revealed the initial proposals for a new stadium in the north of Coventry, at the time envisaged as having 40,000 seats and included in England's unsuccessful bid for the 2006 World Cup. The project was backed by Coventry City Council and gained planning permission in 1998, but involved high costs, inducing the board to sell Highfield Road to a property developer and lease it back, before construction had started. On the field, Coventry were forced by the rising debts to sell their top players without replacement, and were finally relegated in 2000–01, ending 34 years of continuous tenure in the top flight.

In their first season back in the second tier, Coventry occupied 4th place with seven games remaining, but ultimately finished 11th, outside the play-off places. The new stadium opened in 2005, having been reduced in size and delayed several times; the club had previously sold its 50% share to the Alan Higgs charity to repay debts. The club's financial situation remained poor, and by 2007 they faced the possibility of being forced out of business; this was averted when the club was bought by hedge fund owner Sisu Capital. Led by chairman Ray Ranson, Coventry signed several promising youngsters in the early Sisu years, but they failed to achieve on-field success. Sisu began reducing investment from 2009 as debts mounted, leading eventually to Ranson's resignation in 2011. They were relegated to League One in 2012, and were forced to groundshare with Northampton Town (a 70-mile round trip from Coventry) for more than a year from 2013, following a rent dispute with the Ricoh Arena owners. Coventry City Football Club Ltd was dissolved, but the team were allowed to continue playing in League One under Sisu Company Otium.

In 2016–17, Coventry were relegated to League Two, but also won the EFL Trophy in the same season, their first trophy for 30 years. The following season, their first in the fourth tier since 1959, they were promoted straight back, finishing sixth and beating Exeter City in the play-off final. Two seasons later, they were promoted again, being awarded the League One championship via a points-per-game system after the season was curtailed due to the COVID-19 pandemic. At the time of curtailment in March 2020, they led the table with 67 points from 34 games. They were exiled from the Ricoh Arena again from 2019 to 2021, playing their home games at St Andrew's in Birmingham, amid ongoing legal action by Sisu over the 2014 purchase of the stadium by rugby club Wasps, which concluded only in 2022 when the European Commission declined to hear an appeal.

The Sisu era at Coventry City ended in 2023, when local businessman Doug King purchased the club. King had also attempted to acquire the stadium, now renamed the CBS Arena, after both Wasps and the stadium holding company had fallen into administration, but his bid came too late and the stadium was eventually sold to Mike Ashley. Coventry finished fifth in the Championship and then progressed to the play-off final at Wembley, missing out on promotion to the Premier League in a penalty shoot-out defeat against Luton Town. The following season, the club reached the FA Cup semi-final for the first time since 1987, facing Manchester United at Wembley. After going 3–0 down, Coventry dramatically levelled the match in stoppage time and had a ‘winning’ goal controversially disallowed for offside in the final seconds by the very narrowest of margins, then went on to lose on penalties. Later in 2024, Coventry dismissed long-time manager Mark Robins following a run of poor results, replacing him with Frank Lampard. Coventry purchased the CBS Arena in August 2025. On 17 April 2026, Coventry were promoted to the Premier League for the first time since the 2000–01 Season after a 1–1 draw with Blackburn Rovers. On 21 April 2026, Coventry defeated Portsmouth 5–1 to clinch the 2025–26 EFL Championship title.

== Kit ==
=== Colours ===
Coventry's home shirts are either completely or predominantly sky blue. However, in past seasons, different 'home colours' were worn. For example, in 1889, the then Singers FC wore pink and blue halved shirts (mirroring the corporate colours of Singers Motors). Furthermore, in the 1890s, black and red were the club's colours. In the early 1920s, the club wore red and green (to reflect the colours of the city crest). Sky blue was first used by Coventry in 1898 and the theme was used until 1922. Variations of blue and white were then used until the 1960s and the beginning of the 'sky blue revolution'. The colour made its return in 1962 thanks to the then manager, Jimmy Hill. To mark the 125th year of the club, Coventry wore a special brown shirt in the last home game of the 2008–09 season against Watford, having first worn a chocolate brown away kit in 1978. This kit has been cited by some as the worst in English football history, but also has an iconic status with some fans.

In 2012, in the Third round FA Cup tie versus Southampton, the team wore a commemorative blue and white striped kit, marking the 25th anniversary of the club winning the FA Cup in 1987. The strip was worn again in January 2013 for Coventry's 3rd round FA Cup fixture with Tottenham Hotspur, whom they beat in the 1987 final. In 2019, Coventry City announced a new third kit in black and white honouring the city's connection with 2 Tone Records on the 40th anniversary of the record label.

=== Kit makers and sponsorship ===
Since the 2019–20 season, the kit is made by Hummel. The home, away, and third kit is sponsored by Monzo as the main club sponsor across the front of the shirt and King of Shaves on the reverse since the 2024–25 season.

The first official kit manufacture deal came in 1974 when Umbro signed a deal with the club. Coventry also had the first kit sponsorship deal in the football league, when Jimmy Hill, then chairman of the club, negotiated a deal with Talbot, who manufactured cars in the city.

Period	Kit manufacturer	Shirt sponsor	Shorts sponsor
1974–75	Umbro	None	None or N/A
1975–80	Admiral Sportswear	None	None or N/A
1980–81	Admiral Sportswear	Talbot	None or N/A
1981–83	Big T	Talbot	None or N/A
1983–84	Umbro	Tallon	None or N/A
1984–85	Umbro	Glazepta	None or N/A
1985–86	Umbro	Elliotts	None or N/A
1986–87	Triple S Sport	Granada Bingo	None or N/A
1987–88	Hummel	Granada Bingo	None or N/A
1988–89	Hummel	None	None or N/A
1989–92	Asics	Peugeot	None or N/A
1992–94	Ribero	Peugeot	None or N/A
1994–96	Pony International	Peugeot	None or N/A
1996–97	Le Coq Sportif	Peugeot	None or N/A
1997–99	Le Coq Sportif	Subaru (home) Isuzu (away)	None or N/A
1999–2004	In House Manufacturer (CCFC Leisure)	Subaru (home) Isuzu (away)	None or N/A
2004–05	Kit@	Subaru (home) Isuzu (away)	None or N/A
2005–06	Kit@	Cassidy Group	None or N/A
2006–10	Puma	Cassidy Group	None or N/A
2010–13	Puma	City Link	None or N/A
2013–14	Puma	Grace Medical Fund (charity partner)	None or N/A
2014–15	Puma	Allsopp & Allsopp	None or N/A
2015–18	Nike	Allsopp & Allsopp	None or N/A
2018–19	Nike	Midrepro	None or N/A
2019–20	Hummel International	Allsopp & Allsopp	The Exams Office
2020–21	Hummel International	BoyleSports (front), Jingltree (back)	G&R Scaffolding (home), SIMIAN Aspects Training (away)
2021–23	Hummel International	BoyleSports (front), XL Motors (back)	G&R Scaffolding (home), SIMIAN Aspects Training (away)
2023–24	Hummel International	King of Shaves (front), XL Motors (sleeve), Coventry Building Society (rear)	G&R Scaffolding
2024–25	Hummel International	Monzo (front), Mercury (sleeve), King of Shaves (rear)	G&R Scaffolding
2025–	Hummel International	Monzo (front), XL Motors (sleeve), Monzo Business (rear)	None or N/A

== Stadium ==
=== Early grounds ===
Coventry's first ground was at Dowells Field, where they played as Singers F.C. from their founding in 1883 until 1887. It was located in the Stoke area south of Binley Road close to a landmark called Robinsons Pit, in an area of fields which belonged at the time to a landowner named Samuel Dowell. The site was later the location of the Gosford Park Hotel and the Coventry loop line railway, and much of the former pitch is now occupied by housing.

The club's second pitch was at Stoke Road, to which Singers moved in 1887. It was located between Paynes Lane and Swan Lane, immediately to the south of the eventual Highfield Road stadium. The move coincided with the appointment of J.G. Morgan as club secretary, who transformed the club's operations and was the first to hold a manager role. Unlike Dowells Field, Stoke Ground was fully enclosed by hedges and trees and featured a small stand and entrances close to the White Lion and Binley Oak pubs. An admission fee of two pence was charged for attendance at games. Singers' biggest rivals during the Stoke Road years were the Rudge Cycle Company team, with games between the two clubs attracted crowds as high as 4,000 by the end of the 1880s.

=== Highfield Road ===
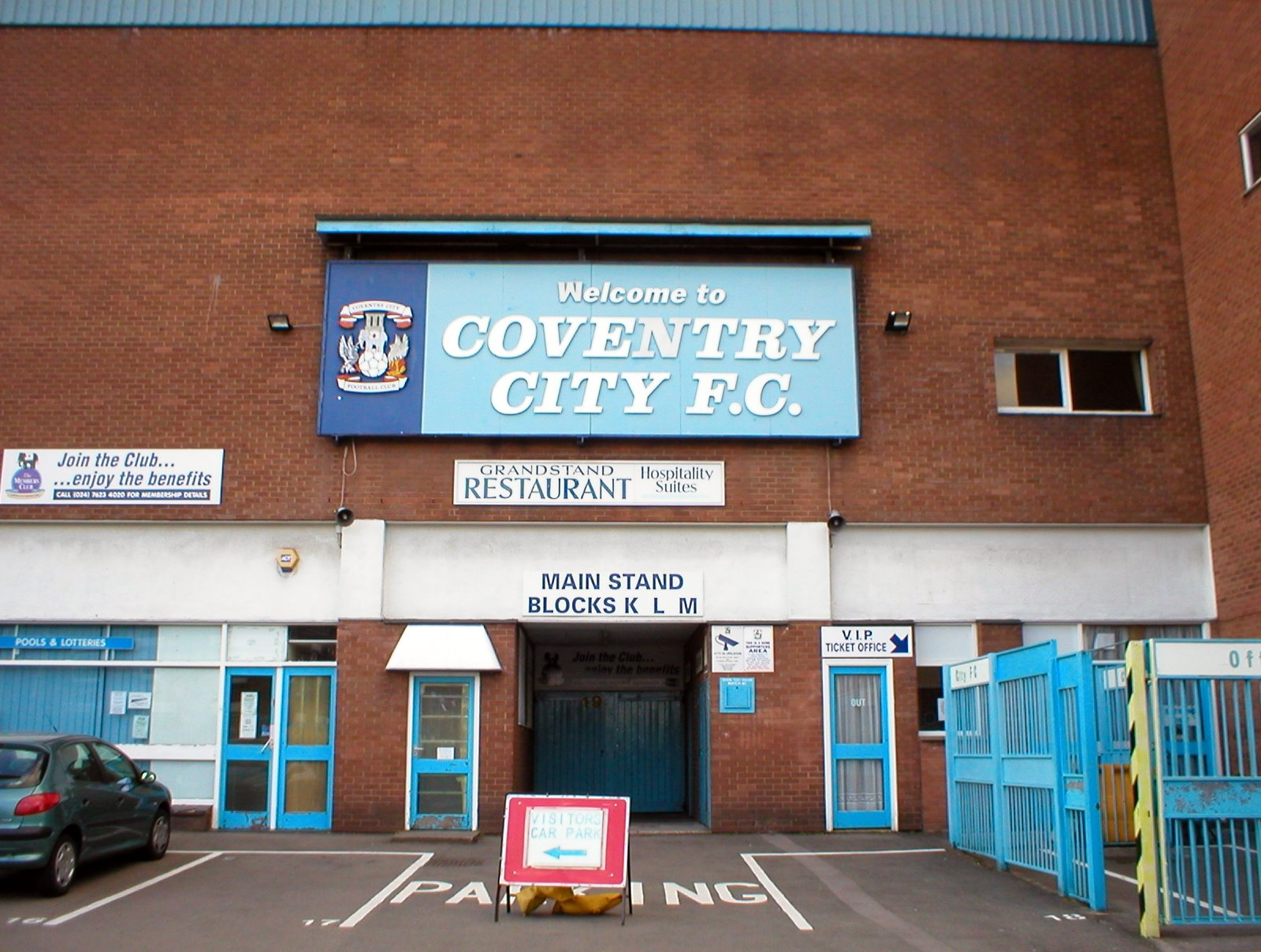
Coventry City played at Highfield Road between 1899 and 2005

In 1899, shortly after Singers became Coventry City, they were forced to vacate Stoke Road due to an extension of King Richard Street and a housing development to accommodate Coventry's rising population. The club acquired a site previously owned by the Craven Cricket Club and built the new stadium there. It was named Highfield Road after the road to the north of the ground, at the time the only access route from the city centre, which was in turn named after a Highfield Farm that had stood on the site earlier. Construction cost £100, a large amount for the club at the time, and on opening the ground featured a single stand on the southern side of the field. The first game at the ground was a 1–0 win against Stoke City with an attendance of 3,000, but the club went on to finish bottom of the Birmingham & District League in the opening season.

A run to the FA Cup quarter finals in 1910 saw a then-record 18,995 attendance at Highfield Road, and the club spent the revenue generated by the cup run on the construction of a new stand on the northern side. A new terrace at the east of the ground, known as the Spion Kop, was opened in 1922, and in 1927 a roof was added over part of the western terrace, taken from Twickenham Stadium and funded by the supporters' club. In 1936, a new main stand was built and in the club also bought the freehold of the ground from the Mercers' Company, following a £20,000 loan by automotive entrepreneur John Siddeley. The stadium was bombed in the Coventry Blitz in 1941, damaging the pitch and the main stand, writer Nemo in the Coventry Telegraph said that Adolf Hitler had "done a spot of ploughing". The first floodlights were installed at the ground in 1953, and were upgraded in 1957, using money raised by the supporters' club.

The "Sky Blue revolution" of Derrick Robins and Jimmy Hill in the 1960s saw large-scale development at Highfield Road, including construction of the new Sky Blue Stand on the north side of the ground. Hill also oversaw the ground's conversion to all-seater as Chairman in 1981, but this was deeply unpopular with fans as well as Hill's successor John Poynton, and a report in early 1985 concluded that it was not achieving its desired effect of combatting hooliganism at Highfield Road. The Spion Kop was reconfigured and converted back to a standing terrace later that year. The Taylor Report of 1990 led to a requirement that all top-flight teams should switch to all-seater. This led to what proved to be the final major development at Highfield Road, the construction of the new East Stand. The stadium hosted its last league game in a 6–2 Coventry win over Derby County in 2005 and was subsequently demolished to make way for a new housing development.

=== Coventry Building Society Arena ===
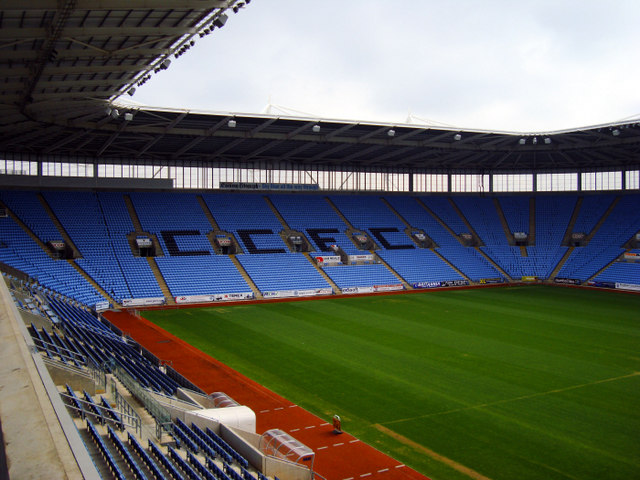
Coventry Building Society Arena

In 1997, Coventry City published plans for a 40,000-seat stadium on the site of a former gasworks in the Foleshill area of Coventry. Backed by a 50% stake from Coventry City Council, the stadium gained planning permission in 1998, and in 2000 was included in England's bid for the 2006 FIFA World Cup. The failure of this bid and relegation in 2001 forced Coventry City to sell their share of the stadium to the Alan Higgs charity to repay debts. After several delays, decontamination work on the site, and reductions in the scope of the project, the stadium hosted its first game in 2005 when Coventry defeated Queen's Park Rangers 3–0. Electronics manufacturer Ricoh were the initial sponsor of the stadium and it was named the Ricoh Arena. In addition to the stadium, the venue features an exhibition hall, hotel and casino and is adjacent to a retail complex and superstore. Coventry Arena railway station was opened next to the site in 2016. It became the Coventry Building Society Arena in 2021 following a deal with Coventry Building Society.

In 2012, the club defaulted on its rent amid a dispute with the stadium's owners, Arena Coventry Limited (ACL) – a company owned jointly by the city council and the Higgs charity. The two sides could not agree on a revised deal and Coventry played its home games at Sixfields Stadium for the 2013–14 season while also announcing plans to build a new stadium elsewhere in Coventry. The move was met with strong opposition and protests by Coventry fans, many of whom boycotted games at the stadium, gathering instead on an area close to Sixfields which they dubbed "Jimmy's Hill".

Coventry City returned to the Ricoh Arena in August 2014 after reaching a deal with ACL. Wasps rugby club purchased the stadium in late 2014, relocating to Coventry from Adams Park in High Wycombe. Coventry City were exiled from the stadium again from 2019 to 2021, playing their home games at St Andrew's and later announcing a partnership with the University of Warwick with the goal of acquiring land for a new stadium. They returned to the Ricoh Arena following an agreement with Wasps in 2021, also maintaining the longer-term goal of constructing a new stadium. When Ashley took over the stadium in 2022, the club for a while faced the threat of eviction but a deal was eventually reached for the club to continue playing there until at least 2028. On 23 August 2025, the club announced it had purchased the stadium from Frasers Group, thus granting them full ownership of the stadium.

== Supporters ==
=== Former Players' Association ===
In February 2007 a Former Players' Association was launched. Set up by club historian and statistician Jim Brown, former 1980s player Kirk Stephens and a committee of volunteers, its aim was to bring former players of the club together and cherish their memories. To qualify for membership players have to have made at least one first-team competitive appearance for the club or been a manager.

About 50 former stars of the club attended the launch including Coventry City legends George Hudson, Cyrille Regis, Charlie Timmins and Bill Glazier. The association's first newsletter was published in autumn 2007 and a website launched. The launch of 2007 was followed by subsequent Legends' Days. The 2009 event, held at the home game against Doncaster Rovers was attended by 43 former players including the first visit to Coventry for many years of Roy Barry and Dave Clements. In March 2012 the membership had increased past the 200 mark with former captain Terry Yorath inducted as the 200th member at the 2012 Legends' Day.

Legends’ Day has become an almost permanent fixture amongst Coventry supporters. Legends’ Day has been held almost every year since the Inaugural Event. The only exceptions being in 2014 when the club were exiled playing home games in Northampton and in 2020 and 2021 after fans were shut out of stadiums as a result of the COVID-19 pandemic.

=== Identity ===
The club's support is collectively known as The Sky Blue Army. In Coventry and Warwickshire the use of the term ‘Going Up The City’ is a term used to say you are going to watch a Coventry City match.

The club's support massively dropped off in the years of the SISU ownership, with the decline in average attendances falling in line with the club's slide down the league pyramid. The exit from The Ricoh Arena in 2013 led to many supporters protesting against SISU's ownership of the club. In the 2013–14 season, in which the club was exiled at Northampton Town's Sixfields Stadium the average attendance dropped to just over 2,000.

The Sky Blue Trust is the largest member-based supporters club and in its peak was fighting to gain a stake in the club and to get fan representation on the board of directors. As of 2022 The Sky Blue Trust are less vocal and are viewed as obsolete by many supporters.

=== Sky Blue anthem ===
The words to the club's song were written in 1962 by Team Manager Jimmy Hill and Director John Camkin; The words being set to the tune of the "Eton Boating Song". It was launched at the home game with Colchester on 22 December 1962 (a match abandoned at half-time because of fog) with the words printed in the programme. It quickly became popular with supporters during the epic FA Cup run in 1963 when the then Third Division team reached the quarter-finals of the FA Cup before losing to eventual winners Manchester United:

Original Words:
Let's all sing together
Play up, Sky Blues
While we sing together
We will never lose
Proud, Posh or Cobblers
Oysters or anyone
They shan't defeat us
We'll fight till the game is won!
City! City! City!

Current Words:
Let's all sing together
Play up, Sky Blues
While we sing together
We will never lose
Tottenham or Chelsea
United or anyone
They shan't defeat us
We'll fight till the game is won!
City! City! City!

=== Famous supporters ===
The club has a number of famous supporters, Television Broadcaster Richard Keys was born in the city and is a lifelong supporter of the club.

The former principal of the Red Bull Formula 1 team Christian Horner was outed as a supporter of the club when he jokingly claimed in an interview with Sky F1 he was trying to convince Kevin De Bruyne to join the club.

Haas F1 Team principal Ayao Komatsu revealed in an interview with Sky Sports F1 that he is a fan of the club. Komatusu's support stems from being introduced to the club whilst he was studying at Loughborough University. Following the break after the 2026 Japanese Grand Prix, the Team and Komatsu attended the club's training ground

Comedian Josh Pugh grew up in nearby Atherstone and currently lives in Coventry and supports the Sky Blues.

Musician Neville Staple of The Specials is also a keen supporter of the club and in 2019, appeared in a kit launch for the club's new ‘Two Tone’ themed Third Kit. Tom Clarke, Andy Hopkins and Liam Watts who formed local rock band The Enemy are also Coventry City supporters.

Singer/songwriter Tom Grennan is also a fan of the club owing to his manager and agent being a Sky Blues fan.

The actor Graeme Hawley who is best known for playing the role of John Stape in the ITV soap opera Coronation Street is a season ticket holder at the club. Other famous fans include professional Darts players Steve Beaton and Steve Hine, Formula 1 mogul Eddie Jordan and Westlife member Brian McFadden.

Malcolm In The Middle actor Frankie Muniz is reportedly a Coventry City fan, apparently owing to a producer he made friends with on the set of the film Agent Cody Banks 2.

Politician Geoffrey Robinson is a fan of the club and once served as chairman.

== Rivalries ==
Coventry's principal rivalries are with their local rivals in the English Midlands; these include Aston Villa, Leicester City, Birmingham City, West Bromwich Albion and Wolverhampton Wanderers. In the late 1960s and early 1970s, the rivalry with Wolverhampton was the most noteworthy – the clubs were both promoted in 1967, meeting in the Second Division championship decider, and then contested an FA Cup quarter-final six years later which was won by Wolverhampton.

Aston Villa are Coventry's traditional rival. Historically, Aston Villa were Coventry's main rivals, however many Coventry supporters also view the rivalry with Leicester City as significant. This rivalry is more reciprocated due to Villa's stronger rivalry with Birmingham City. Coventry's main rivals as of late are Sunderland AFC with the pair forging an unlikely rivalry in recent years despite the 206 miles between the clubs.

Throughout the 1980s and 1990s and to the turn of the millennium, Aston Villa were considered Coventry's main rivals as they continually competed against each other in the First Division and then the Premier League. The two clubs however have not met since Coventry's relegation from the Premier League in 2001. Leicester and Coventry compete the M69 Derby. However, largely due to the clubs' differing fortunes meetings between the two have been rare in recent years; the two clubs had not played each other between 2012 and 2023. The derby returned for the first time in eleven years in the 2023–24 EFL Championship season, following Leicester's relegation from the Premier League. A small section of The Sky Blues' support were widely condemned in the build up to an M69 Derby in January 2024, after offensive banners mocking the death of former Foxes owner Vichai Srivaddhanaprabha were displayed across the City of Coventry

In the 1960s and 1970s there was intense rivalry with Wolverhampton Wanderers which started in 1965 after Wolves were relegated from Division One and the two clubs met in Division Two. The two sides were promoted together in 1967 and there were fierce battles in both city centres when the clubs met during the period. There was also rivalries with West Bromwich Albion and Walsall but these are much less fierce than the ones with Leicester, Wolves and Villa. A local rivalry also exists with Birmingham City, however the ground share agreement at St Andrew's between 2019 and 2021 – which effectively spared Coventry from being expelled from the EFL – has led to friendlier relations between the two clubs’ supporters.

The club has an unusual long-distance rivalry with North-East side Sunderland, which stems back to the end of the 1976–77 season, when Coventry, Sunderland and Bristol City were all battling against relegation from Division One on the final day of the season. With Coventry and Bristol City facing each other at Highfield Road, the referee, on the advice of the police, delayed the kick-off of the match by 15 minutes as many Bristol City fans were still trying to enter the ground and there was a risk of serious trouble. Sunderland, who were playing away to Everton at the same time, lost 2–0, and the result was displayed on the Highfield Road scoreboard. There were still 15 minutes left to play and Coventry and Bristol City effectively stopped playing knowing that a 2–2 draw would keep both teams up and send Sunderland down. There was an inquiry but the result was allowed to stand and Sunderland were relegated. Some Sunderland fans have held a grudge and there has also been some rivalry more recently as the two clubs competed for promotion from League One together in 2018–19 and 2019–20. In 2018–19 crowd trouble marred the meetings between the two at The Ricoh Arena and The Stadium of Light leading to numerous arrests among both sets of fans.

In a 2020 survey conducted by the Coventry Telegraph, supporters of various teams were asked to name the top-five clubs they viewed as rivals. Among Coventry supporters, Aston Villa were the club named the most with 83% including them. This was followed by Leicester City with 76%, Wolverhampton Wanderers with 50%, Birmingham City with 47% and West Bromwich Albion with 45%. Sunderland were named by 34% of Coventry fans. In the other direction, 66% of Leicester City fans included Coventry in their top five while the club were named by about 50% of supporters from Northampton, West Brom, Aston Villa, Birmingham City, Burton Albion, Wolves, Walsall and Sunderland.

== Players ==
=== First-team squad ===
As of 16 September 2026

Note: Flags indicate national team as defined under FIFA eligibility rules; some limited exceptions apply. Players may hold more than one non-FIFA nationality.

No.	Pos.	Nation	Player
1	GK	SWE	Oliver Dovin
2	DF	JAM	Ethan Pinnock
3	DF	WAL	Jay Dasilva
4	DF	ENG	Bobby Thomas
5	MF	ENG	Jack Rudoni
6	MF	ENG	Matt Grimes (captain)
7	FW	JPN	Tatsuhiro Sakamoto
8	MF	GHA	Caleb Yirenkyi
9	FW	ENG	Ellis Simms
10	FW	JAM	Ephron Mason-Clark
11	FW	USA	Haji Wright
12	DF	ENG	Stephen Mfuni (on loan from Manchester City)
13	GK	ENG	Ben Wilson
14	FW	NGR	Taiwo Awoniyi
16	MF	NGR	Frank Onyeka

No.	Pos.	Nation	Player
17	FW	FRA	Loum Tchaouna
19	GK	ENG	Carl Rushworth
20	DF	ENG	Kaine Kesler-Hayden
21	DF	ENG	Jake Bidwell
22	DF	JAM	Joel Latibeaudiere
23	FW	GHA	Brandon Thomas-Asante
24	DF	SUI	Aurèle Amenda
25	GK	ENG	Dan Bentley
26	DF	ENG	Luke Woolfenden
27	DF	NED	Milan van Ewijk
28	MF	ENG	Josh Eccles
29	MF	DEN	Victor Torp
34	FW	CIV	Yann Gboho
38	MF	NED	Gustavo Hamer
49	FW	GUI	Sidiki Cherif

=== Under-21 squad ===
As of 28 August 2025

Note: Flags indicate national team as defined under FIFA eligibility rules; some limited exceptions apply. Players may hold more than one non-FIFA nationality.

No.	Pos.	Nation	Player
43	DF	ENG	Tristen Batanwi
44	DF	ITA	Riccardo Di Trolio
47	MF	ENG	Elliot Betjemann
48	GK	ENG	Luke Bell
50	MF	ENG	Joseph McCallum
51	GK	ENG	Oscar Varney

No.	Pos.	Nation	Player
55	MF	ENG	Mackenzie Stretton
59	FW	USA	Aidan Dausch
—	GK	WAL	Eliot Meredith
—	DF	ENG	Tionne Critchlow-Woyo
—	DF	ENG	Shay Dunn
—	MF	ENG	George Shepherd

=== Out on loan ===
Note: Flags indicate national team as defined under FIFA eligibility rules; some limited exceptions apply. Players may hold more than one non-FIFA nationality.

No.	Pos.	Nation	Player
15	DF	IRL	Liam Kitching (at Sheffield United until 30 June 2027)
17	FW	AUS	Raphael (at Burton Albion until 30 June 2027)
33	DF	ESP	Miguel Ángel Brau (at Académico de Viseu until 30 June 2027)
36	DF	ENG	Isaac Moore (at Walsall until 30 June 2027)
37	FW	BEL	Norman Bassette (at Westerlo until 30 June 2027)

No.	Pos.	Nation	Player
41	DF	ENG	Callum Perry (at Cambridge United until 30 June 2027)
49	DF	ENG	Harvey Broad (at AFC Fylde until 30 June 2027)
52	DF	ENG	David Mantle (at Maidenhead United until 5 December 2026)
54	MF	WAL	Kai Andrews (at Oxford United until 2 January 2027)

== Management ==
=== Coaching staff ===
Name	Position
Frank Lampard	Head Coach
Joe Edwards	Assistant Coach
Chris Jones; John Dempster	First-Team Coach
Sal Bibbo	Goalkeeper Coach
Liam Kelly	Under 21s Manager
Daniel Bolas	Academy Manager
Dr Ricky Shamji	Club Doctor
Vacant	Performance Director
TBC	First-Team Physiotherapist
Adam Hearn	Head of Sports Science
Andy Young	Senior Fitness Coach
Jonny Clancy	Head of Analysis
Dean Austin	Sporting Director
Jamie Johnson	Head of Recruitment
Harry Colledge	Kit Manager
Abbie Forman	Sports Scientist

=== Board ===
Name	Position
Doug King	Owner/Executive Chairman
John Taylor	Chief Operations Officer
Nicola Ibbetson	Chief Business Officer
Brett Baker	Head of Football Administration
Mark Hornby	Head of External Relations
Suzette Johnson	Hospitality Manager
Danielle McGorman	Head of Ticketing
Dan Smith	Head of Partnerships
Chris Pihoue	Head of Marketing
Alex Lowe	Head of Communications
Reece Venning	Head of Grounds (CBS Arena)
Connor Brady	Head of Grounds (Ryton)
Neil Matts	Head of Grounds (Academy)
Megan Drage	Head of Training Ground and Academy Facilities
David Busst	Head of Sky Blues in the Community
Jim Brown	Club Historian

== Seasons and statistics ==
=== Seasons ===
Season Review & Statistics	Level	Pos.	Player of the Year	Top Goalscorer	Matches	Most Appearances	Most Captain Apps	Other
1958–59 season	4	2nd (24)	not awarded	(England) Ray Straw 30	48	(England) Roy Kirk 48	(Republic of Ireland) Reg Ryan	Football League Fourth Division Runners-up
1959–60 season	3	5th (24)	not awarded	(England) Ray Straw 21	48	(South Africa) Arthur Lightening 48	(England) Roy Kirk	Southern Professional Floodlit Cup Winners
1960–61 season	3	15th (24)	not awarded	(England) Ray Straw 20	51	(England) George Curtis 51	(England) George Curtis	
1961–62 season	3	14th (24)	not awarded	(England) Mike Dixon 12	49	(England) George Curtis 49	(England) George Curtis	
1962–63 season	3	4th (24)	not awarded	(England) Terry Bly 29	57	(England) George Curtis 56	(England) George Curtis	
1963–64 season	3	1st (24)	not awarded	(England) George Hudson 28	50	(England) George Curtis 50 (Wales) Ronnie Rees 50	(England) George Curtis	Football League Third Division Champions
1964–65 season	2	10th (22)	not awarded	(England) George Hudson 24	47	(England) George Curtis 46 (Wales) Ronnie Rees 46	(England) George Curtis	
1965–66 season	2	3rd (22)	not awarded	(England) George Hudson 17	50	(England) George Curtis 50	(England) George Curtis	
1966–67 season	2	1st (22)	not awarded	(England) Bobby Gould 25	46	(England) George Curtis 46	(England) George Curtis	Football League Second Division Champions
1967–68 season	1	20th (22)	(England) Ernie Machin	(Wales) Ronnie Rees 9	46	(England) Ernie Machin 44	(England) George Curtis	FA Youth Cup Runners-up
1968–69 season	1	20th (22)	(England) Bill Glazier	(England) Ernie Hunt 13	49	(England) Bill Glazier 49	(England) George Curtis	
1969–70 season	1	6th (22)	(Scotland) Neil Martin	(Scotland) Neil Martin 15	45	(England) Mick Coop 44	(Scotland) Roy Barry	FA Youth Cup Runners-up
1970–71 season	1	10th (22)	(Scotland) Willie Carr	(England) Ernie Hunt 13 (Scotland) Neil Martin 13	52	(England) Jeff Blockley 52	(Scotland) Neil Martin	Inter-Cities Fairs Cup Second round; BBC Goal of the Season: (England) Ernie Hunt
1971–72 season	1	18th (22)	(England) Ernie Hunt	(England) Ernie Hunt 12	45	(Scotland) Willie Carr 45 (England) Wilf Smith 45	(Scotland) Roy Barry	Texaco Cup Second round
1972–73 season	1	19th (22)	(Scotland) Willie Carr	(Scotland) Brian Alderson 17	48	(England) Mick Coop 48	(Scotland) Roy Barry	Texaco Cup First round
1973–74 season	1	16th (22)	(England) Bill Glazier	(Scotland) Brian Alderson 15	54	(Republic of Ireland) Jimmy Holmes 53 (Scotland) Tommy Hutchison 53	(England) John Craven	Texaco Cup First round
1974–75 season	1	14th (22)	(England) Graham Oakey	(Scotland) Brian Alderson 8 (England) David Cross 8	46	(Scotland) Tommy Hutchison 46	(England) John Craven	
1975–76 season	1	14th (22)	(Scotland) Tommy Hutchison	(England) David Cross 16	47	(England) Mick Coop 47 (Scotland) Tommy Hutchison 47	(England) John Craven	
1976–77 season	1	19th (22)	(Scotland) Jim Blyth	(England) Mick Ferguson 15	47	(England) John Beck 45	(Wales) Terry Yorath	
1977–78 season	1	7th (22)	(Scotland) Ian Wallace	(Scotland) Ian Wallace 23	47	(Scotland) Bobby McDonald 47 (England) Barry Powell 47	(Wales) Terry Yorath	
1978–79 season	1	10th (22)	(Scotland) Bobby McDonald	(Scotland) Ian Wallace 15	45	(Scotland) Tommy Hutchison 45 (Scotland) Bobby McDonald 45	(Wales) Terry Yorath	
1979–80 season	1	15th (22)	(Scotland) Gary Gillespie	(Scotland) Ian Wallace 13	47	(Scotland) Tommy Hutchison 45	(Scotland) Tommy Hutchison	
1980–81 season	1	16th (22)	(England) Danny Thomas	(England) Garry Thompson 15	55	(England) Paul Dyson 54 (England) Harry Roberts 54	(England) Mick Coop	Football League Cup semi-finalists
1981–82 season	1	14th (22)	(England) Danny Thomas	(England) Mark Hateley 18	48	(Scotland) Gary Gillespie 46	(Republic of Ireland) Gerry Daly	PFA Merit Award: (England) Joe Mercer
1982–83 season	1	19th (22)	(Scotland) Gary Gillespie	(England) Steve Whitton 14	48	(Scotland) Gary Gillespie 48	(England) Gerry Francis	PFA Team OTY (Div 1): (England) Danny Thomas
1983–84 season	1	19th (22)	(England) Nick Platnauer	(England) Terry Gibson 19	49	(England) Terry Gibson 41 (England) Nick Platnauer 41	(England) Harry Roberts	
1984–85 season	1	18th (22)	(England) Terry Gibson	(England) Terry Gibson 19	46	(England) Steve Ogrizovic 46	(England) Trevor Peake	
1985–86 season	1	17th (22)	(England) Trevor Peake	(England) Terry Gibson 13	47	(England) Steve Ogrizovic 47	(England) Brian Kilcline	
1986–87 season	1	10th (22)	(England) Steve Ogrizovic	(England) Cyrille Regis 16	53	(England) Steve Ogrizovic 53	(England) Brian Kilcline	FA Cup Winners: 1987 FA Cup final; FA Youth Cup Winners: 1987 FA Youth Cup final; BBC Goal of the Season: (England) Keith Houchen
1987–88 season	1	10th (21)	(Scotland) David Speedie	(England) Cyrille Regis 12	46	(England) Steve Ogrizovic 46	(England) Brian Kilcline	FA Charity Shield Runners-up: 1987 FA Charity Shield; Full Members Cup semi-finalists
1988–89 season	1	7th (20)	(Scotland) David Speedie	(Scotland) David Speedie 15	42	(England) Brian Borrows 42 (England) Steve Ogrizovic 42	(England) Brian Kilcline	
1989–90 season	1	12th (20)	(England) Brian Borrows	(Scotland) David Speedie 9	47	(England) Brian Borrows 46 (England) David Smith 46	(England) Brian Kilcline	Football League Cup semi-finalists
1990–91 season	1	16th (20)	(Scotland) Kevin Gallacher	(Scotland) Kevin Gallacher 16	47	(England) Brian Borrows 47	(England) Brian Kilcline	PFA Merit Award: (Scotland) Tommy Hutchison
1991–92 season	1	19th (22)	(England) Stewart Robson	(Scotland) Kevin Gallacher 10	48	(England) Lloyd McGrath 46	(England) Stewart Robson	
1992–93 season	1	15th (22)	(England) Peter Atherton	(England) Micky Quinn 17	45	(England) John Williams 44	(England) Brian Borrows	
1993–94 season	1	11th (22)	(Republic of Ireland) Phil Babb	(Zimbabwe) Peter Ndlovu 11	46	(Republic of Ireland) Phil Babb 44 (England) Steve Morgan 44	(England) Brian Borrows	
1994–95 season	1	16th (22)	(England) Brian Borrows	(England) Dion Dublin 16	49	(England) Brian Borrows 40 (England) Paul Cook 40 (England) Steve Ogrizovic 40	(England) Brian Borrows	PFA Merit Award: (Scotland) Gordon Strachan
1995–96 season	1	16th (20)	(England) Paul Williams	(England) Dion Dublin 16	45	(England) John Salako 43	(England) Dion Dublin	
1996–97 season	1	17th (20)	(England) Dion Dublin	(England) Dion Dublin 13	46	(Scotland) Gary McAllister 46 (England) Steve Ogrizovic 46	(Scotland) Gary McAllister	
1997–98 season	1	11th (20)	(England) Dion Dublin	(England) Dion Dublin 23	47	(England) Dion Dublin 43	(Scotland) Gary McAllister	Premier League Golden Boot: (England) Dion Dublin; PFA Merit Award: (England) Steve Ogrizovic
1998–99 season	1	15th (20)	(England) Richard Shaw	(England) Noel Whelan 13	44	(Sweden) Magnus Hedman 42 (England) Richard Shaw 42	(Scotland) Gary McAllister	FA Youth Cup Runners-up
1999–2000 season	1	14th (20)	(Scotland) Gary McAllister	(Scotland) Gary McAllister 13	43	(Scotland) Gary McAllister 43	(Scotland) Gary McAllister	FA Youth Cup Runners-up; FAI Young Int'l Player OTY: (Republic of Ireland) Robbie Keane
2000–01 season	1	19th (20)	(Republic of Ireland) Gary Breen	(Wales) Craig Bellamy 8	44	(Wales) Craig Bellamy 39	(Morocco) Mustapha Hadji	PFA Merit Award: (England) Jimmy Hill; Welsh Footballer OTY: (Wales) John Hartson
2001–02 season	2	11th (24)	(England) David Thompson	(England) Lee Hughes 14	49	(Bosnia and Herzegovina) Muhamed Konjić 41	(England) John Eustace	
2002–03 season	2	20th (24)	(Bosnia and Herzegovina) Muhamed Konjić	(England) Jay Bothroyd 11	52	(Bosnia and Herzegovina) Muhamed Konjić 48	(Bosnia and Herzegovina) Muhamed Konjić	
2003–04 season	2	12th (24)	(England) Stephen Warnock	(England) Gary McSheffrey 12	51	(England) Stephen Warnock 49	(Bosnia and Herzegovina) Muhamed Konjić	FWA Tribute Award: (England) Jimmy Hill
2004–05 season	2	19th (24)	(Republic of Ireland) Michael Doyle	(England) Gary McSheffrey 14	51	(Republic of Ireland) Michael Doyle 49	(England) Stephen Hughes	First CONCACAF 50-goal scorer: (Trinidad and Tobago) Stern John; Last goal at Highfield Road: (England) Andy Whing
2005–06 season	2	8th (24)	(England) Gary McSheffrey	(England) Gary McSheffrey 17	51	(England) Gary McSheffrey 50	(Republic of Ireland) Michael Doyle	First goal at Ricoh Arena: (Faroe Islands) Claus Bech Jørgensen
2006–07 season	2	17th (24)	(England) Andy Marshall	(Nigeria) Dele Adebola 9	49	(Nigeria) Dele Adebola 42 (Republic of Ireland) Michael Doyle 42 (England) Marcus Hall 42 (England) Andy Marshall 42	(Wales) Rob Page	Birmingham Senior Cup Winners
2007–08 season	2	21st (24)	(Republic of Ireland) Jay Tabb	(Malta) Michael Mifsud 17	53	(Republic of Ireland) Michael Doyle 49 (England) Isaac Osbourne 49 (Republic of Ireland) Jay Tabb 49	(England) Stephen Hughes	
2008–09 season	2	17th (24)	(Iceland) Aron Gunnarsson	(Republic of Ireland) Clinton Morrison 12	53	(Republic of Ireland) Keiren Westwood 49	(England) Scott Dann	PFA Team OTY (Champ): (England) Danny Fox, (Republic of Ireland) Keiren Westwood
2009–10 season	2	19th (24)	(Republic of Ireland) Keiren Westwood	(Republic of Ireland) Clinton Morrison 11	49	(Republic of Ireland) Keiren Westwood 46	(England) Stephen Wright	
2010–11 season	2	18th (24)	(Jamaica) Marlon King	(Jamaica) Marlon King 13	49	(Republic of Ireland) Richard Keogh 48	(Republic of Ireland) Lee Carsley	FL Fan OTY: (England) Kevin Monks
2011–12 season	2	23rd (24)	(Republic of Ireland) Richard Keogh	(England) Lukas Jutkiewicz 9 (England) Gary McSheffrey 9	48	(Republic of Ireland) Richard Keogh 47 (Republic of Ireland) Joe Murphy 47	(Northern Ireland) Sammy Clingan	Championship Apprentice Award: (Burundi) Gaël Bigirimana
2012–13 season	3	15th (24) ^{†}	(England) Carl Baker	(Republic of Ireland) David McGoldrick 18	58	(Republic of Ireland) Joe Murphy 56	(England) Carl Baker	FL Trophy Northern area finalists; PFA Team OTY (L1): (England) Leon Clarke; FL Fan OTY: (England) Pat Raybould
2013–14 season	3	18th (24) ^{††}	(England) Callum Wilson	(England) Callum Wilson 22	53	(Republic of Ireland) Joe Murphy 53	(England) Carl Baker	FL Goal OTY: (Belgium) Franck Moussa; PFA Team OTY (L1): (England) Callum Wilson
2014–15 season	3	17th (24)	(Scotland) Jim O'Brien	(England) Frank Nouble 7	52	(Scotland) John Fleck 47 (Scotland) Jim O'Brien 47	(Benin) Réda Johnson	
2015–16 season	3	8th (24)	(Scotland) John Fleck	(England) Adam Armstrong 20	49	(Wales) Sam Ricketts 46 (France) Romain Vincelot 46	(Wales) Sam Ricketts	PFA Team OTY (L1): (England) Adam Armstrong
2016–17 season	3	23rd (24)	(Wales) George Thomas	(Wales) George Thomas 9	59	(England) Jordan Turnbull 46 (England) Jordan Willis 46	(England) Jordan Willis	EFL Trophy Winners: 2017 EFL Trophy final
2017–18 season	4	6th (24)	(Scotland) Marc McNulty	(Scotland) Marc McNulty 28	58	(Scotland) Jack Grimmer 53	(Republic of Ireland) Michael Doyle	EFL League Two play-offs Winners: 2018 play-off final; EFL Team OTY: (England) Lee Burge, (England) Jordan Willis; PFA Team OTY (L2): (Scotland) Jack Grimmer; PFA Fans' Player OTY: (Scotland) Marc McNulty; PFA Merit Award: (England) Cyrille Regis
2018–19 season	3	8th (24)	(Scotland) Dominic Hyam	(England) Jordy Hiwula 13	51	(England) Luke Thomas 44	(Scotland) Liam Kelly	
2019–20 season	3	1st (23) ^{†††}	(England) Fankaty Dabo	(England) Matt Godden 15	47	(Republic of Ireland) Jordan Shipley 42	(Scotland) Liam Kelly	EFL League One Champions; LMA Awards Manager OTY (L1): (England) Mark Robins; PFA Team OTY (L1): (Slovakia) Marko Maroši, (England) Fankaty Dabo, (England) Liam Walsh, (England) Matt Godden
2020–21 season	2	16th (24)	(England) Callum O'Hare	(England) Tyler Walker 8	49	(England) Callum O'Hare 48	(Scotland) Liam Kelly	
2021–22 season	2	12th (24)	(Netherlands) Gustavo Hamer	(Sweden) Viktor Gyökeres 18	49	(Sweden) Viktor Gyökeres 47 (England) Callum O'Hare 47	(England) Kyle McFadzean	Championship Apprentice Award: (Wales) Ryan Howley
2022–23 season	2	5th (24)	(Netherlands) Gustavo Hamer	(Sweden) Viktor Gyökeres 22	51	(England) Jake Bidwell 50 (Sweden) Viktor Gyökeres 50	(England) Kyle McFadzean	EFL Championship play-offs Runners-up: 2023 play-off final; Birmingham Senior Cup Runners-up; EFL Team OTY: (England) Ben Wilson, (Sweden) Viktor Gyökeres; EFL Golden Glove: (England) Ben Wilson; PFA Team OTY (Champ): (Sweden) Viktor Gyökeres
2023–24 season	2	9th (24)	(England) Ben Sheaf	(England) Ellis Simms 19 (United States) Haji Wright 19	53	(England) Ellis Simms 53	(England) Ben Sheaf	FA Cup semi-finalists
2024–25 season	2	5th (24)	(England) Jack Rudoni	(United States) Haji Wright 12	53	(Netherlands) Milan van Ewijk 51	(England) Ben Sheaf	EFL Championship play-offs semi-finalists; PFA Lifetime Achievement Award: (England) David Busst
2025–26 season	2	1st (24)	(England) Carl Rushworth	(United States) Haji Wright 18	49	(England) Matt Grimes 48	(England) Matt Grimes	EFL Championship Champions; EFL Team OTY: (England) Carl Rushworth, (Netherlands) Milan van Ewijk, (England) Matt Grimes, (United States) Haji Wright; EFL Manager OTY: (England) Frank Lampard; EFL Golden Glove: (England) Carl Rushworth; LMA Awards Manager OTY (Champ): (England) Frank Lampard; LMA Awards Manager OTY (Overall): (England) Frank Lampard; PFA Team OTY (Champ): (England) Carl Rushworth, (Netherlands) Milan van Ewijk, (England) Bobby Thomas, (England) Matt Grimes, (England) Jack Rudoni, (United States) Haji Wright
2026–27 season	1	17th (20) *		(England) Jack Rudoni 4 *	12	(Ghana) Caleb Yirenkyi 12 *	(England) Matt Grimes	

^{†} Coventry City deducted 10 points by the Football League for going into administration.
^{††} Coventry City deducted 10 points by the Football League.
^{†††} Bury were expelled from the EFL on 27 August 2019 due to financial issues at the club. The season was postponed on 13 March 2020 and later concluded prematurely due to the COVID-19 pandemic, with league positions and promotions decided on a points-per-game basis.
* Season in progress.

=== Football Club Elo ranking ===
As of 16 August 2026

Rank	Team	Points
119	(Argentina) Independiente	1675
120	(France) Lorient	1674
121	(Brazil) Grêmio FBPA	1674
122	(England) Coventry City	1674
123	(France) Toulouse	1674
124	(Scotland) Celtic	1673
125	(Spain) Racing de Santander	1673

== Notable players ==
=== Official Hall of Fame ===
Player	Apps	Goals
(England) Dave Bennett	201	33
(England) Brian Borrows	477	13
(England) Clarrie Bourton	241	182
(Scotland) Willie Carr	280	36
(England) Mick Coop	492	22
(England) George Curtis	538	13
(Scotland) Jimmy Dougall	236	14
(England) Dion Dublin	170	72

Player	Apps	Goals
(England) Ron Farmer	311	52
(England) Mick Ferguson	141	57
(Scotland) Ian Gibson	101	14
(England) Bill Glazier	395	0
(England) Fred Herbert	199	85
(England) George Hudson	129	75
(England) Ernie Hunt	166	51
(Scotland) Tommy Hutchison	355	30

Player	Apps	Goals
(England) Mick Kearns	382	16
(Wales) Leslie Jones	145	73
(Scotland) Jock Lauderdale	182	63
(Wales) George Lowrie	85	59
(England) Ernie Machin	289	39
(England) George Mason	350	9
(England) Reg Matthews	116	0
(England) Steve Ogrizovic	601	1

Player	Apps	Goals
(England) Trevor Peake	336	7
(Wales) Ronnie Rees	262	52
(England) Cyrille Regis	283	62
(England) Richard Shaw	362	1
(England) Danny Thomas	123	6
(Scotland) Ian Wallace	138	60
(England) Alf Wood	246	0

=== Notable Academy graduates ===
Player	Achievements
(England) Tom Bayliss	2017–18 EFL League Two play-off winner with Coventry
(Burundi) Gaël Bigirimana	2017 EFL Trophy Final winner with Coventry, 2012 Championship Apprentice Award winner
(Republic of Ireland) Willie Boland	Over 200 appearances for Cardiff City, 2001–02 FAW Premier Cup winner
(England) Lee Burge	2017–18 EFL League Two play-off winner with Coventry, 2017 EFL Trophy Final winner with Coventry, over 150 appearances for Coventry
(Republic of Ireland) Cyrus Christie	24 international caps and 2 goals for Republic of Ireland, over 100 appearances for Coventry
(England) Jordan Clarke	Over 100 appearances for Coventry
(England) Jonson Clarke-Harris	2017–18 EFL League Two play-off winner with Coventry, youngest player to play in a first-team match for Coventry
(England) Josh Eccles	Over 100 appearances for Coventry
(England) John Eustace	Coventry club captain
(England) Marcus Hall	England U21 captain, over 300 appearances for Coventry
(England) Ryan Haynes	2017–18 EFL League Two play-off winner with Coventry, 2017 EFL Trophy Final winner with Coventry
(Wales) Ryan Howley	2022 Championship Apprentice Award winner
(Republic of Ireland) Dean Kiely	11 international caps for Republic of Ireland, 2007–08 Championship Golden Glove, two-time Football League Championship winner
(England) Chris Kirkland	1 international cap for England, 2004–05 UEFA Champions League winner
(England) James Maddison	7 international caps for England (subject to change), part of England 2022 World Cup squad, January 2018 EFL Young Player of the Month
(England) Gary McSheffrey	Over 250 appearances for Coventry, two-time Football League Championship runner-up
(Republic of Ireland) Roy O'Donovan	2 caps for Republic of Ireland B, 2015–16 A-League Goal of the Year winner
(England) Isaac Osbourne	Over 100 appearances for Coventry
(England) Jordan Ponticelli	2017–18 EFL League Two play-off winner with Coventry
(England) Josh Ruffels	Over 300 appearances for Oxford United
(Republic of Ireland) Jordan Shipley	2019–20 EFL League One winner with Coventry, 2017–18 EFL League Two play-off winner with Coventry, over 100 appearances for Coventry
(England) Ben Stevenson	2017 EFL Trophy Final winner with Coventry
(England) Daniel Sturridge	26 international caps and 8 goals for England, 2011–12 UEFA Champions League winner, 2009–10 Premier League winner
(England) Conor Thomas	Over 100 appearances for Coventry
(Wales) George Thomas	2017 EFL Trophy Final winner with Coventry
(Scotland) Kevin Thomson	3 international caps for Scotland, two-time Scottish Premier League winner, 2007–08 Scottish Cup winner
(Republic of Ireland) Kevin Thornton	Over 50 appearances for the first team, 2012–13 FA Trophy winner
(England) Ben Turner	2012–13 Football League Championship winner
(England) Andy Whing	Over 100 appearances for Coventry. Last player to score at Highfield Rd and first player to score at The Ricoh Arena
(England) Jordan Willis	2017–18 EFL League Two play-off winner with Coventry, 2017 EFL Trophy Final winner with Coventry, Coventry club captain, over 200 appearances for Coventry
(England) Callum Wilson	6 international caps and 1 goal for England, part of England 2022 World Cup squad, two Premier League hat-tricks, 2014–15 Football League Championship winner

=== Player records ===
Record	Details
Highest transfer fee paid	(Ghana) Caleb Yirenkyi, £23.1 million in 2026 (from Nordsjælland)
Highest transfer fee received	(Sweden) Viktor Gyökeres, £20.5 million in 2023 (to Sporting CP)
Most appearances (all competitions)	(England) Steve Ogrizovic, 601 (1984–2000)
Most appearances (league)	(England) Steve Ogrizovic, 504 (1984–2000)
All-time top scorer (all competitions)	(England) Clarrie Bourton, 182 goals (1931–1937)
All-time top scorer (league)	(England) Clarrie Bourton, 173 goals (1931–1937)
Top-flight era top scorer (all competitions)	(England) Dion Dublin, 72 goals (1994–1998)
Top-flight era top scorer (league)	(England) Dion Dublin, 60 goals (1994–1998)
Most goals by one player in a game	(England) Arthur Bacon, 5 (vs Gillingham, 1933) (England) Clarrie Bourton, 5 (vs Bournemouth & Boscombe Athletic, 1931) (England) Cyrille Regis, 5 (vs Chester City, 1985)
Most goals by one player in a season	(England) Clarrie Bourton, 50 (1931–1932, 49 league, 1 FA Cup)
Most goals by one player in a season in top-flight	(England) Dion Dublin, 23 (1997–1998) (Scotland) Ian Wallace, 23 (1977–1978)
Oldest player to play in a first-team match	(England) Alf Wood, 43 years 207 days (vs Plymouth Argyle, 1958)
Youngest player to play in a first-team match	(England) Jonson Clarke-Harris, 16 years 21 days (substitute vs Morecambe, 2010)
Youngest player to start a first-team match	(England) Brian Hill, 16 years 273 days (vs Gillingham, 1958)

== Managers and chairmen ==
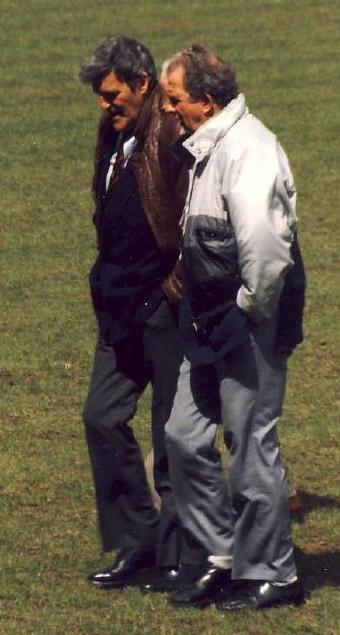
Jimmy Hill (left) was manager 1961–1967, and chairman 1980–1983

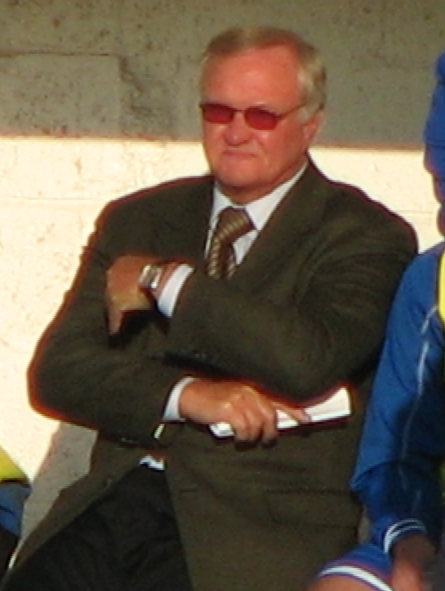
Ron Atkinson was manager 1995–1996

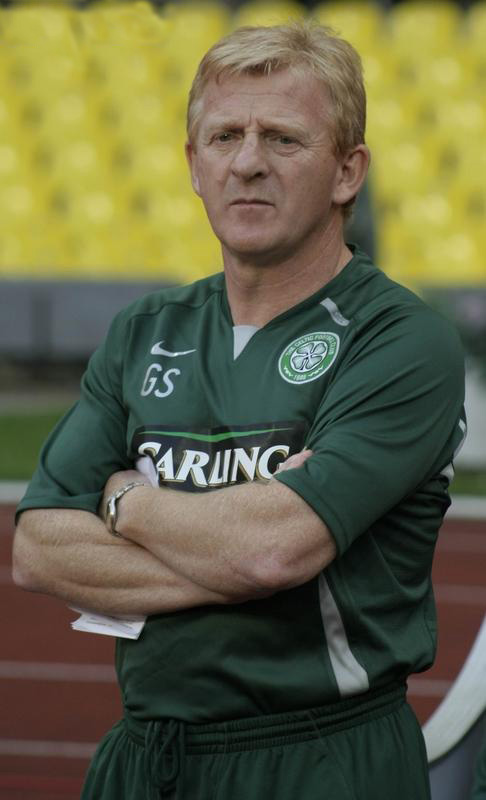
Gordon Strachan was manager 1996–2001

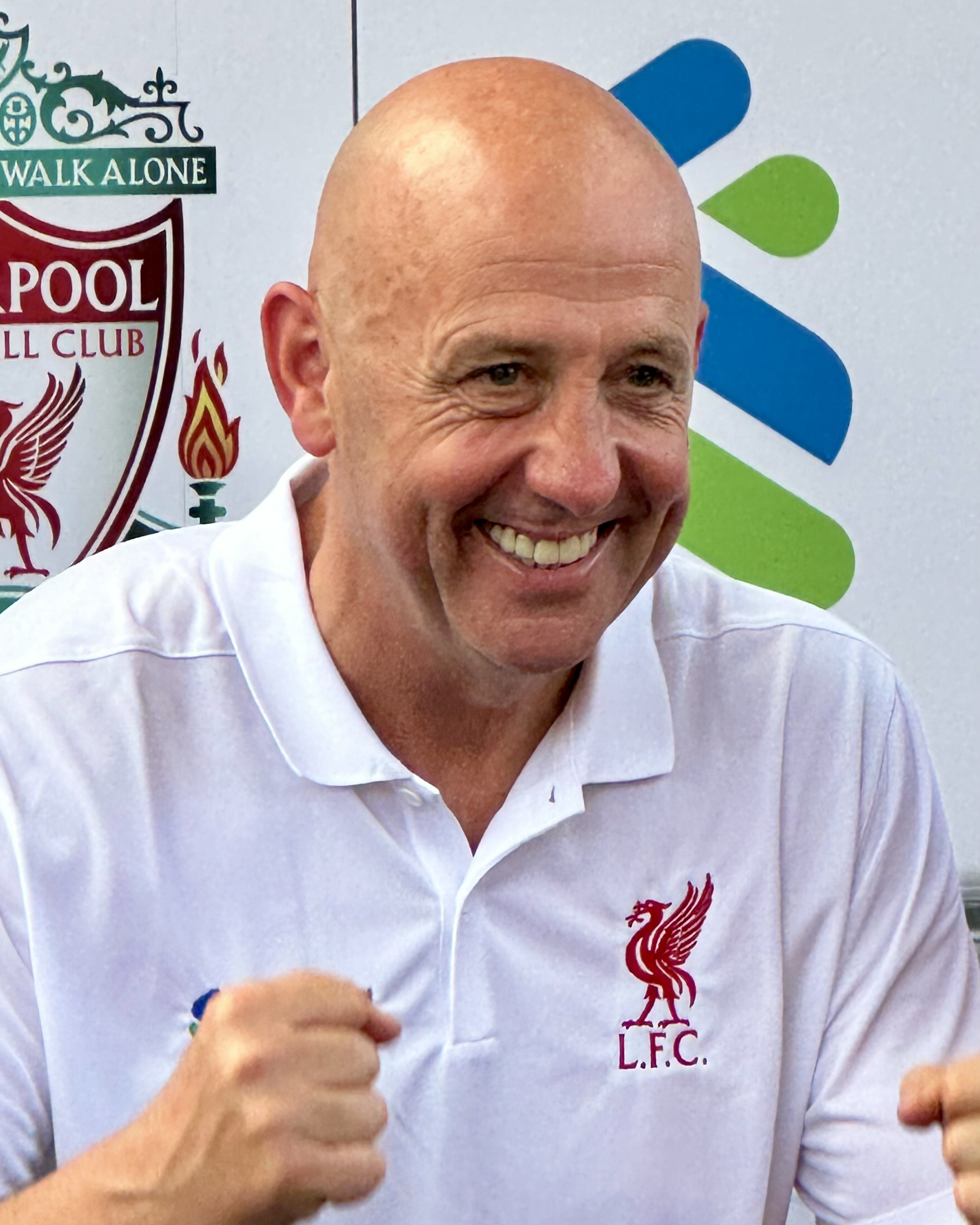
Gary McAllister was manager 2002–2003

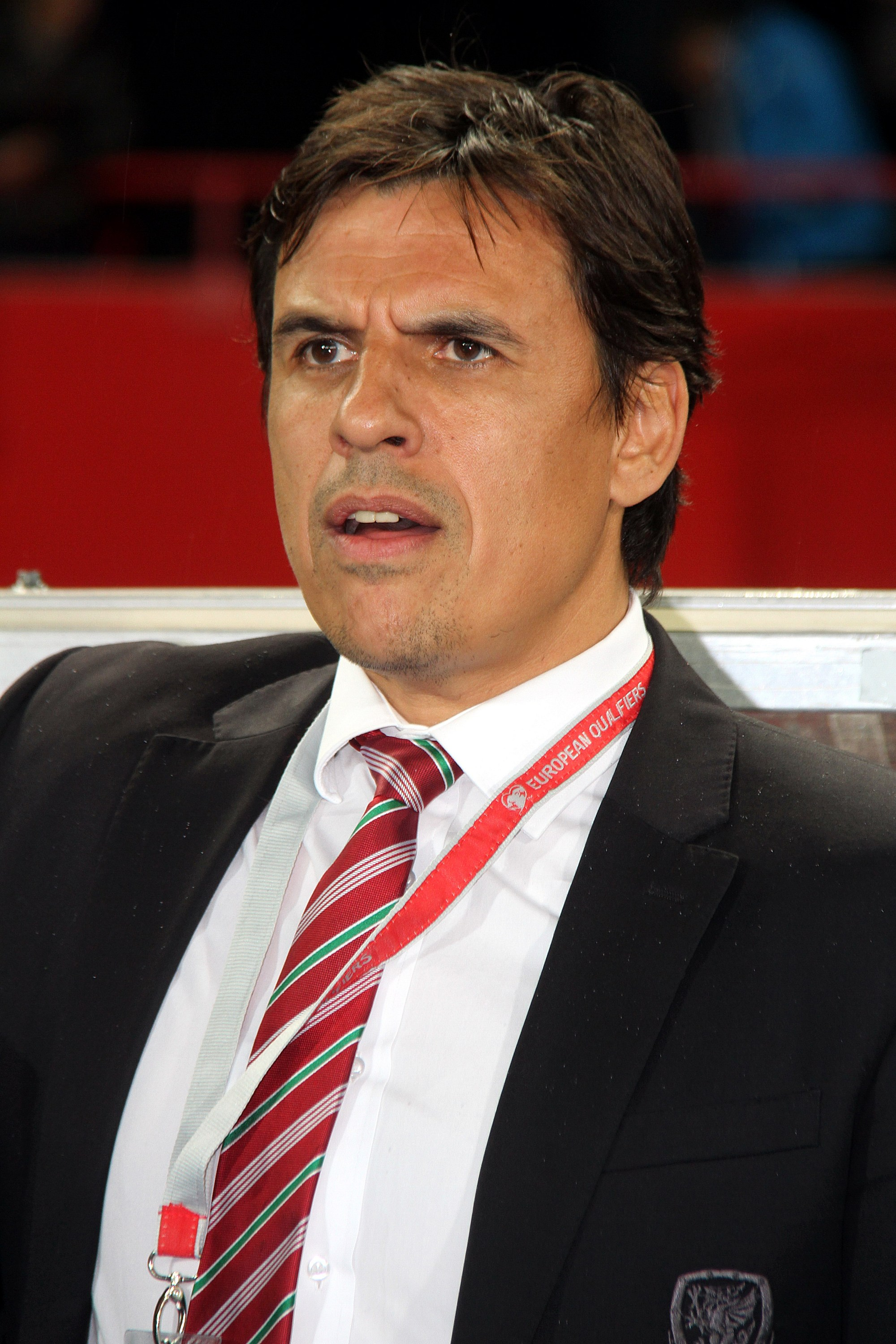
Chris Coleman was manager 2008–2010

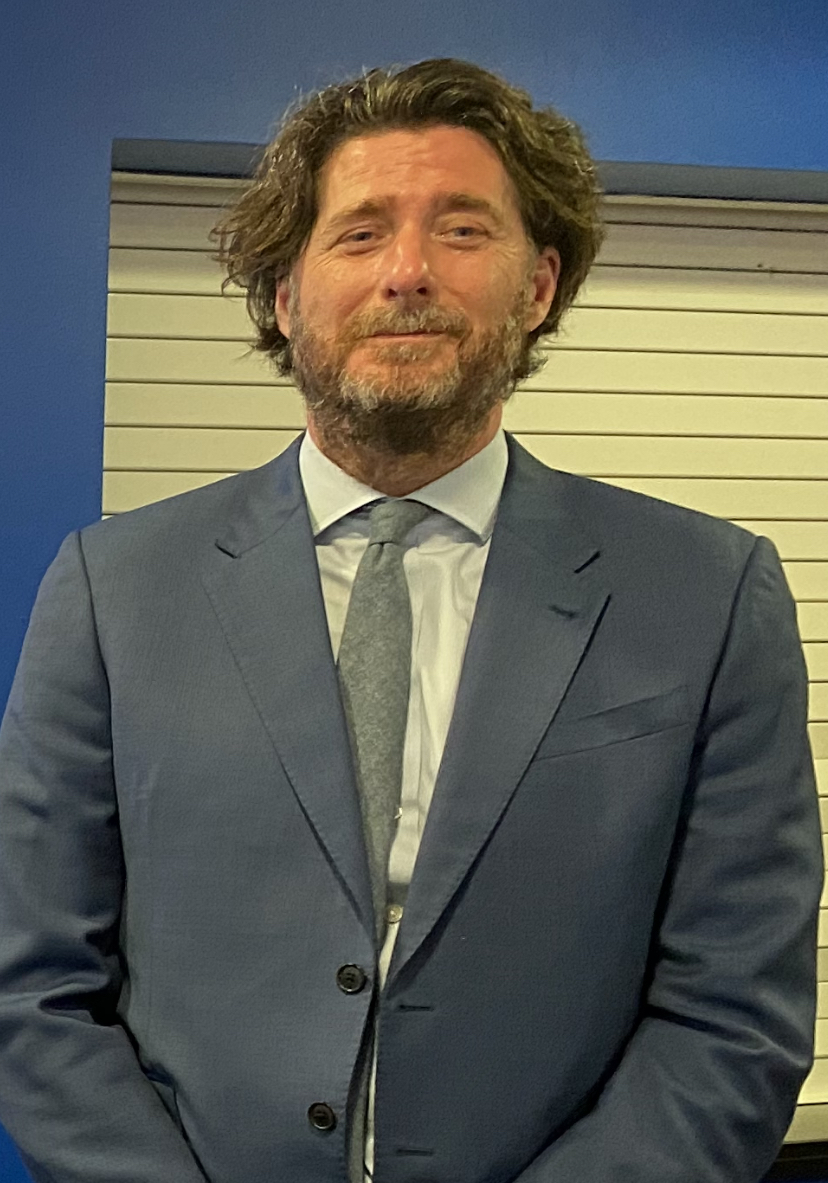
Tim Fisher (SISU group) was chairman 2014–2023

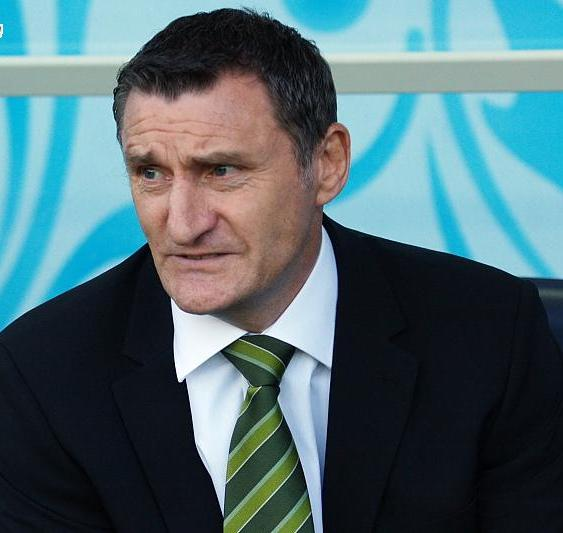
Tony Mowbray was manager 2015–2016

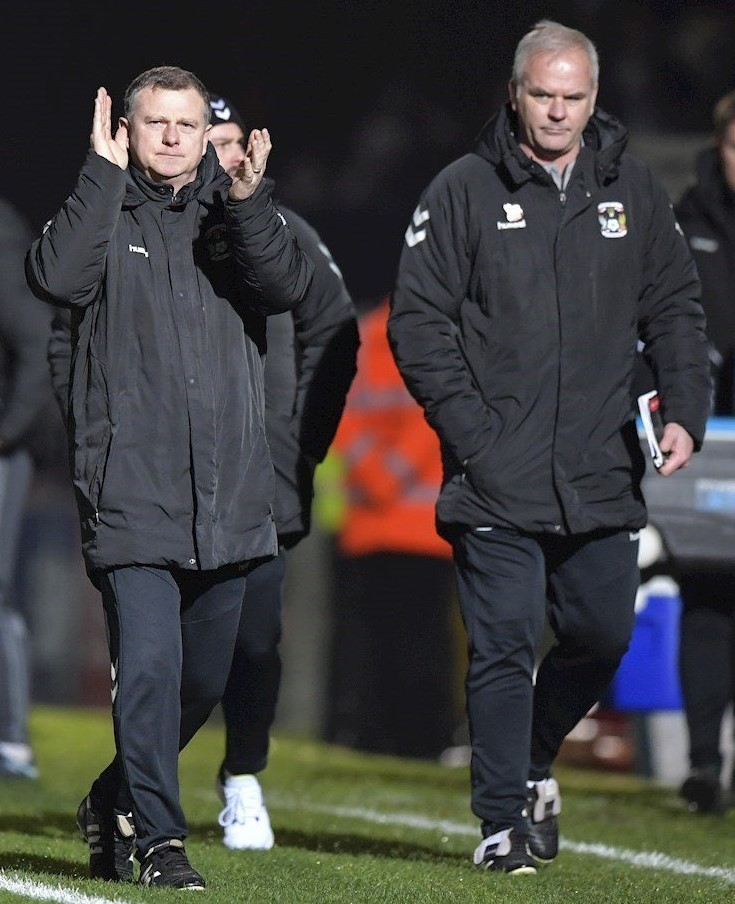
Mark Robins (left) was manager 2012–2013 and 2017–2024, alongside assistant manager Adi Viveash (right) 2017–2024

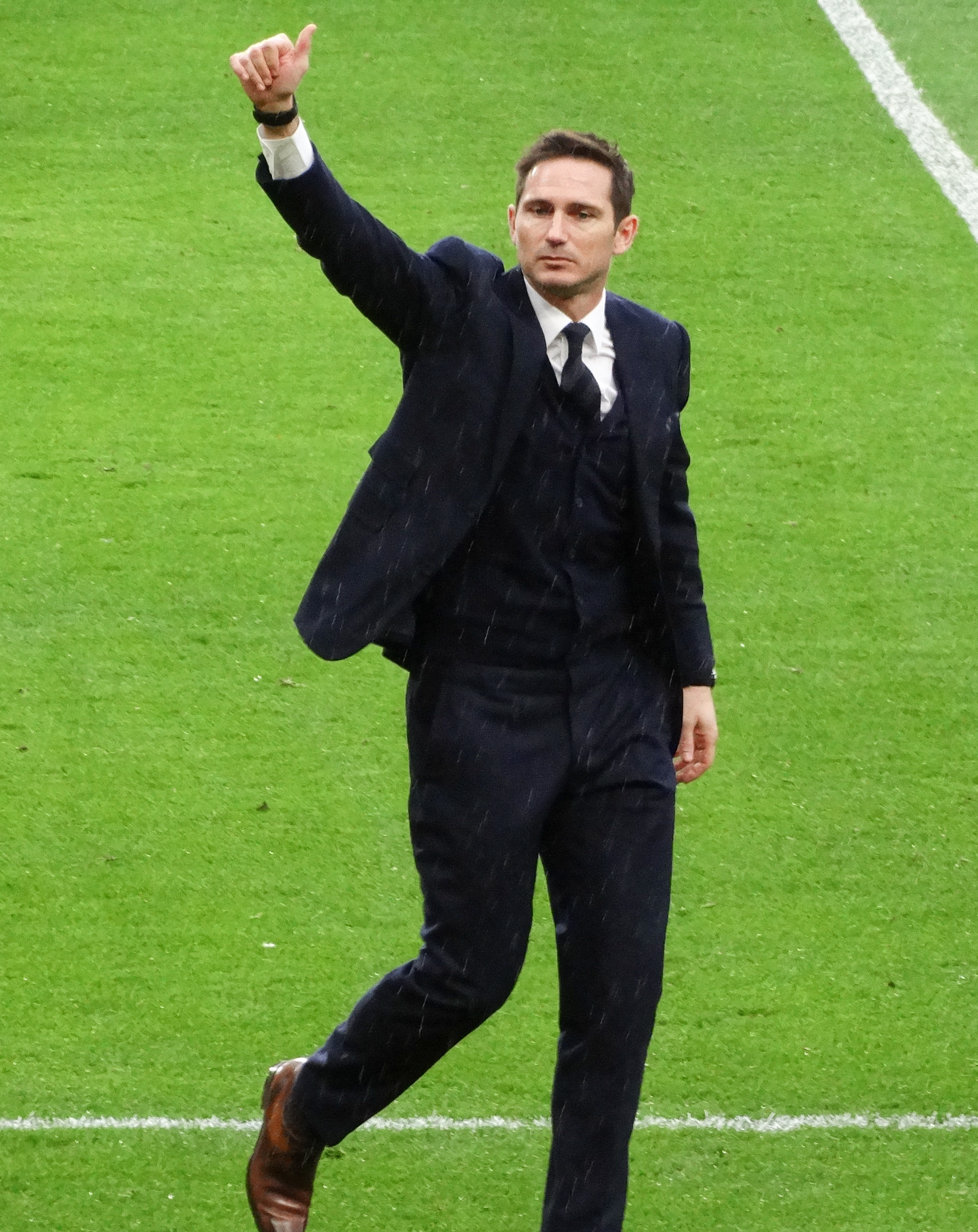
Frank Lampard has been manager since 2024

Permanent manager

Dates	Chairman	Dates	Manager(s)
1883–1907	Unknown	1883–1885	(England) William Stanley
1883–1907	Unknown	1885–1887	(England) Harry Hathaway
1883–1907	Unknown	1887–1892	(England) J.G. Morgan
1883–1907	Unknown	1893	(England) Teddy Kirk
1883–1907	Unknown	1893	(England) George Maley
1883–1907	Unknown	1893–1895	(England) Joe Collins
1883–1907	Unknown	1895–1900	(England) Tom Cashmore
1883–1907	Unknown	1900–1902	(England) Ben Newhall
1883–1907	Unknown	1902–1905	(Republic of Ireland) Michael O'Shea
1883–1907	Unknown	1905–1907	(England) Joe Beaman
1907–1912	(England) Thomas Owen	1907–1908	(England) Joe Beaman
1907–1912	(England) Thomas Owen	1908–1909	(England) Walter Harris
1907–1912	(England) Thomas Owen	1909–1910	(Northern Ireland) Harry Buckle
1907–1912	(England) Thomas Owen	1910–1912	(England) Robert Wallace & committee
1912–1928	(England) David Cooke	1912–1913	(England) Robert Wallace & committee
1912–1928	(England) David Cooke	1913–1915	(England) Frank Scott-Walford & committee
1912–1928	(England) David Cooke	1915–1917	(England) H. Howard & committee (caretaker)
1912–1928	(England) David Cooke	1917–1919	(England) William Clayton
1912–1928	(England) David Cooke	1919–1920	(England) Harry Pollitt
1912–1928	(England) David Cooke	1920–1924	(England) Albert Evans
1912–1928	(England) David Cooke	1924–1925	(England) Harry Harbourne (caretaker)
1912–1928	(England) David Cooke	1925–1928	(Scotland) James Kerr
1928–1935	(England) Walter Brandish	1928	Vacant
1928–1935	(England) Walter Brandish	1928–1931	(England) Jimmy McIntyre
1928–1935	(England) Walter Brandish	1931	(England) Bill Slade (caretaker)
1928–1935	(England) Walter Brandish	1931–1935	(England) Harry Storer
1935–1946	(England) Fred Stringer	1935–1945	(England) Harry Storer
1935–1946	(England) Fred Stringer	1945–1946	(England) Dick Bayliss
1946–1954	(England) George Jones	1946–1947	(England) Dick Bayliss
1946–1954	(England) George Jones	1947	Vacant
1946–1954	(England) George Jones	1947–1948	(England) Billy Frith
1946–1954	(England) George Jones	1948–1953	(England) Harry Storer (2)
1946–1954	(England) George Jones	1953–1954	Vacant
1954–1958	(England) W Erle Shanks	1954	(England) Jack Fairbrother
1954–1958	(England) W Erle Shanks	1954–1955	(England) Charlie Elliott (caretaker)
1954–1958	(England) W Erle Shanks	1955	(England) Jesse Carver
1954–1958	(England) W Erle Shanks	1956	(England) George Raynor
1954–1958	(England) W Erle Shanks	1956–1957	(England) Harry Warren
1954–1958	(England) W Erle Shanks	1957–1958	(England) Billy Frith (2)
1958–1960	(England) Walter Brandish Jr.	1958–1960	(England) Billy Frith (2)
1960–1973	(England) Derrick Robins	1960–1961	(England) Billy Frith (2)
1960–1973	(England) Derrick Robins	1961–1967	(England) Jimmy Hill
1960–1973	(England) Derrick Robins	1967–1972	(Republic of Ireland) Noel Cantwell
1960–1973	(England) Derrick Robins	1972	(England) Bob Dennison (caretaker)
1960–1973	(England) Derrick Robins	1972–1973	(England) Joe Mercer
1973–1975	(England) Peter Robins	1973–1974	(England) Joe Mercer
1973–1975	(England) Peter Robins	1974–1975	(England) Gordon Milne
1975–1977	(England) Jack Scamp	1975–1977	(England) Gordon Milne
1977–1980	(England) Phil Mead	1977–1980	(England) Gordon Milne
1980–1983	(England) Jimmy Hill	1980–1981	(England) Gordon Milne
1980–1983	(England) Jimmy Hill	1981–1983	(England) Dave Sexton
1983–1984	(Scotland) Iain Jamieson	1983	(England) Dave Sexton
1983–1984	(Scotland) Iain Jamieson	1983–1984	(England) Bobby Gould
1984–1990	(England) John Poynton	1984	(England) Bobby Gould
1984–1990	(England) John Poynton	1984–1986	(Scotland) Don Mackay
1984–1990	(England) John Poynton	1986–1987	(England) John Sillett (England) George Curtis
1984–1990	(England) John Poynton	1987–1990	(England) John Sillett
1984–1990	(England) John Poynton	1990	(England) Terry Butcher
1990–1993	(England) Peter Robins (2)	1990–1992	(England) Terry Butcher
1990–1993	(England) Peter Robins (2)	1992	(England) Don Howe (caretaker)
1990–1993	(England) Peter Robins (2)	1992–1993	(England) Bobby Gould (2)
1993	(England) John Clarke	1993	(England) Bobby Gould (2)
1993–2002	(England) Bryan Richardson	1993	(England) Bobby Gould (2)
1993–2002	(England) Bryan Richardson	1993–1995	(England) Phil Neal
1993–2002	(England) Bryan Richardson	1995–1996	(England) Ron Atkinson
1993–2002	(England) Bryan Richardson	1996–2001	(Scotland) Gordon Strachan
1993–2002	(England) Bryan Richardson	2001–2002	(Sweden) Roland Nilsson
2002–2005	(England) Mike McGinnity	2002	(Sweden) Roland Nilsson
2002–2005	(England) Mike McGinnity	2002	(England) Steve Ogrizovic (caretaker) (England) Trevor Peake (caretaker)
2002–2005	(England) Mike McGinnity	2002–2003	(Scotland) Gary McAllister
2002–2005	(England) Mike McGinnity	2003–2004	(Scotland) Eric Black
2002–2005	(England) Mike McGinnity	2004	(England) Steve Ogrizovic (2) (caretaker)
2002–2005	(England) Mike McGinnity	2004–2005	(England) Peter Reid
2002–2005	(England) Mike McGinnity	2005	(England) Adrian Heath (caretaker)
2002–2005	(England) Mike McGinnity	2005	(England) Micky Adams
2005–2007	(England) Geoffrey Robinson	2005–2007	(England) Micky Adams
2005–2007	(England) Geoffrey Robinson	2007	(England) Adrian Heath (2) (caretaker)
2005–2007	(England) Geoffrey Robinson	2007	(Northern Ireland) Iain Dowie
2007	(England) Joe Elliott	2007	(Northern Ireland) Iain Dowie
2007–2011	(England) Ray Ranson	2007–2008	(Northern Ireland) Iain Dowie
2007–2011	(England) Ray Ranson	2008	(England) Frankie Bunn (caretaker) (Australia) John Harbin (caretaker)
2007–2011	(England) Ray Ranson	2008–2010	(Wales) Chris Coleman
2007–2011	(England) Ray Ranson	2010	(England) Steve Harrison (caretaker)
2007–2011	(England) Ray Ranson	2010–2011	(England) Aidy Boothroyd
2011	(England) Ken Dulieu	2011	(England) Aidy Boothroyd
2011	(England) Ken Dulieu	2011	(England) Steve Harrison (2) (caretaker) (England) Andy Thorn (caretaker)
2011	(England) Ken Dulieu	2011	(England) Andy Thorn
2011–2012	(England) John Clarke (2)	2011–2012	(England) Andy Thorn
2012–2014	Vacant	2012	(England) Andy Thorn
2012–2014	Vacant	2012	(England) Richard Shaw (caretaker) (Republic of Ireland) Lee Carsley (caretaker)
2012–2014	Vacant	2012–2013	(England) Mark Robins
2012–2014	Vacant	2013	(Republic of Ireland) Lee Carsley (2) (caretaker)
2012–2014	Vacant	2013–2014	(Scotland) Steven Pressley
2014–2023	(England) Tim Fisher	2014–2015	(Scotland) Steven Pressley
2014–2023	(England) Tim Fisher	2015	(Scotland) Neil MacFarlane (caretaker) (England) Dave Hockaday (caretaker)
2014–2023	(England) Tim Fisher	2015–2016	(England) Tony Mowbray
2014–2023	(England) Tim Fisher	2016	(England) Mark Venus (caretaker)
2014–2023	(England) Tim Fisher	2016–2017	(England) Russell Slade
2014–2023	(England) Tim Fisher	2017–2023	(England) Mark Robins (2)
2023–	(England) Doug King	2023–2024	(England) Mark Robins (2)
2023–	(England) Doug King	2024	(Wales) Rhys Carr (caretaker)
2023–	(England) Doug King	2024–	(England) Frank Lampard

== Honours ==
League

- Second Division / EFL Championship (level 2)
  - Champions: 1966–67, 2025–26
- Third Division South / Third Division / League One (level 3)
  - Champions: 1935–36, 1963–64, 2019–20
  - Runners-up: 1933–34
- Fourth Division / League Two (level 4)
  - Runners-up: 1958–59
  - Play-off winners: 2018

Cup

- FA Cup
  - Winners: 1986–87
- FA Charity Shield
  - Runners-up: 1987
- EFL Trophy
  - Winners: 2016–17
- Third Division South Cup
  - Winners: 1935–36
- Birmingham Senior Cup
  - Winners: 1910–11, 1922–23, 2006–07
  - Runners-up: 2022–23
- Southern Professional Floodlit Cup
  - Winners: 1959–60
