= George Curtis (footballer, born 1939) =

English association football player (1939–2021)

Personal information
- Full name: George William Curtis
- Date of birth: 5 May 1939
- Place of birth: Aylesham, England
- Date of death: 17 July 2021 (aged 82)
- Height: 5 ft 11 in (1.80 m)
- Position: Defender

Senior career*
Years	Team	Apps	(Gls)
- Snowdown Colliery Welfare
1955–1969	Coventry City	487	(11)
1969–1972	Aston Villa	51	(3)
Total		538	(14)

International career
1956–1957	England U18	4	(0)

Managerial career
- 1986–1987: Coventry City
- * Club domestic league appearances and goals

George William Curtis (5 May 1939 – 17 July 2021) was an English footballer who played in the Football League as a defender for Coventry City and Aston Villa. He made 543 appearances for Coventry between 1956 and 1969, the club's record for an outfield player, winning the 1963–64 Third Division and the 1966–67 Second Division titles and also playing in the First Division from 1967 until 1969. With Aston Villa, he was part of the side which won the 1971–72 Third Division.

After retiring from playing, Curtis returned to Coventry to work on the managerial staff, remaining there until his retirement in 1994. Between April 1986 and May 1987, he was the joint manager of the team alongside John Sillett, during which time the club won its only major honour, beating Tottenham Hotspur 3–2 in the 1987 FA Cup Final.

== Early life ==
George William Curtis was born on 5 May 1939 in the Kent village of Aylesham, in the Kent Coalfield close to Dover. He was the second of seven children born into a coal mining family whose origins were in Newport, South Wales. As a child he played association football for the Dover Boys and Kent Boys teams.

== Playing career ==
Curtis started his playing career with the Snowdown Colliery Welfare team, based close to his home, before signing for Coventry City in October 1955. He was one of four Snowdown Colliery players to join Coventry at that time, on the recommendation of former Coventry captain Harry Barratt who had become manager of the Kent club, the others being Alf Bentley, Eric Jones and Bill Patrick. Curtis made his debut for the Coventry reserve team in a Football Combination fixture against Southampton on 10 December 1955 at the age of 16. He made his first-team league debut on 21 April 1956, playing in a 4–2 defeat against Newport County at Somerton Park. Coventry were competing in the Football League Third Division South, which was at that time the third tier of the English football league system. Playing at left-back at the time, Coventry Evening Telegraph reporter Derek Henderson, writing under the byline "Nemo", wrote that Curtis had a "memorable" first game, and that "after a shaky opening [he] settled down to give a splendid showing after the interval". Curtis was then called up to the England national under-18 team in May 1956, making his debut in a match against Northern Ireland in Belfast. He went to make three more appearances for England, the last coming in 1957.

In one game against Brighton in October 1957, when he was playing for the injured Roy Kirk, Henderson wrote that Curtis "did his best", but was "too often beaten in the air". Towards the end of the 1957–58 season, Curtis began playing regularly in the Coventry first team, having switched position to centre-half. In their game away against Aldershot, Henderson described it as the day "that George Curtis, Coventry City's boy footballer, became George Curtis the man". With Coventry in the lower half of the Third Division South, and heading towards a place in the new Fourth Division, Aldershot's forwards had numerous attacks on the Coventry goal, but they scored only once, which Henderson attributed to Curtis's defending alongside saves from goalkeeper Charlie Ashcroft. Curtis then became Coventry's first-choice centre-half for the following nine seasons; between 1960 and mid-1967 he missed only two games for the club.

Despite an early-season blip, which saw Coventry occupy their lowest-ever league position of 91st of the 92 teams in England's top four divisions after three games, the club's stay in the Fourth Division was limited to just one season as they were promoted back to the Third Division in 1958–59. Curtis was then named as Coventry's captain in December 1959, when previous incumbent Kirk was dropped to the reserve team. At that time, Curtis was conscripted for National Service, working at RAF Gaydon during the week while still playing games for Coventry. He also played football for the Royal Air Force team at the base, commenting at the time that he scarcely "breaks sweat" in those games. In 1961, Coventry appointed Jimmy Hill as manager, a move which brought an era of success to the club known as the "Sky Blue Revolution". With Curtis as club captain and playing 50 games during the season, Coventry achieved promotion as champions of the Third Division in 1963–64. The following season they led the Second Division after five games, eventually finishing in mid-table, before mounting a serious promotion challenge in the 1965–66 Second Division.

Finally, in 1966–67, with Curtis still captaining the side, Coventry achieved promotion to the First Division as Second Division champions. Evaluating the season after promotion had been secured, Henderson mentioned in particular Curtis's performance in a 1–0 win at Blackburn Rovers in March. Noting that it was "not a day when one could admire the football", Henderson labelled Curtis's defending as "quite the most magnificent performance I have seen him give". Curtis himself was optimistic about the club's prospects in the top division, commenting in May 1967 that "a lot of people – most of them I will say, outside Coventry – are forecasting that we will be out of place in the First Division". He went on to say that the club's aim was not just to avoid relegation, but to achieve qualification for European competitions and to win the league title.

Curtis suffered a broken leg in Coventry's second game in the First Division, and did not return to the team until Easter of 1968. He came on as a substitute in a game at Highfield Road against Stoke City, before making his first start since the injury in an away game, also against Stoke City, the next day. He suffered a recurrence of the injury and did not play again until October 1968. He continued to play for Coventry for the next year, including scoring in a 2–1 win over Manchester United in April 1969, but at the age of 30, he eventually lost his regular place in the side to Roy Barry. His last appearance for Coventry was as a substitute against Burnley in November 1969. His 543 games in all competitions was a club record at the time, and although it was eventually surpassed by goalkeeper Steve Ogrizovic, it remains the highest for an outfield player as of 2021.

Curtis's next club was Second Division club Aston Villa, who signed him in December 1969 for £30,000 (approximately £500,000 as of 2021, adjusted for inflation). He scored in his debut match for the club, a 1–1 draw against Swindon Town, although Aston Villa went on to be relegated at the end of the 1969–70 season. In their second season in the third tier, the 1971–72 season, Aston Villa were promoted back to the Second Division as champions, with the club's official website later crediting Curtis as being a "key member" of that team, with 24 appearances in the season. He broke his nose in a match at Notts County in March 1972, after which he played only one more game, retiring from the game shortly afterwards under medical advice.

== Managerial career ==
After retirement as a player, Curtis became commercial manager at Coventry City in 1972, going on to become an executive director at the club and then managing director, in September 1983. In April 1986, with the club facing their third successive relegation battle, and having gone eight games without a win, manager Don Mackay left the club. The board asked Curtis and youth-team coach John Sillett to take charge for the final three games. Coventry won two of those three, and escaped relegation. The pair remained in charge for the 1986–87 season; officially Curtis was the manager, while Sillett was first-team coach, but the two were effectively joint managers. The team achieved a 10th-place finish that season, while also winning the 1986–87 FA Cup, which is as of 2024 the only major trophy Coventry have won. The cup run began with a home win over Bolton Wanderers, followed by away victories over Manchester United, Stoke City and Sheffield Wednesday, with the semi-final being a 3–2 win over Leeds United at the neutral venue Hillsborough. Prior to the Manchester United game, in January 1987, Curtis told reporters that "our name is on the cup". In a match regarded by many pundits as one of the greatest finals in the history of the competition, Coventry beat Tottenham Hotspur 3–2 in the 1987 FA Cup Final at Wembley Stadium.

Sillett became Coventry's sole manager from the 1987–88 season onwards, although as he had led the team onto the field for the FA Cup final, the club gave Curtis that honour when they returned to Wembley for the season's curtain-raiser, the 1987 FA Charity Shield against Everton. Curtis returned to the managing director role, working on matters not related to the day-to-day running of the team. He remained in that role until his retirement in May 1994.

== Legacy and death ==
Curtis was honoured with the naming of a lounge after him at Coventry's Highfield Road stadium. When that ground closed and they moved to the newly built Ricoh Arena in 2005, the club made a "Wall of Fame" which was named after him. He then became one of the club's life presidents in 2012.

Curtis died on 17 July 2021, aged 82.

== Honours ==
=== As a player ===
Coventry City

- Football League Third Division: 1963–64
- Football League Second Division: 1966–67

Aston Villa

- Football League Third Division: 1971–72

=== As a manager ===
Coventry City

- FA Cup: 1986–87
