= King of Shaves =

British toiletries company

The King of Shaves Company Ltd.
- Industry: Shaving and Skincare
- Genre: Shaving, skincare, razors, blades and toiletries
- Predecessor: Knowledge & Merchandising Inc. Ltd.
- Founded: 1993 (KMI), 2009 (KOS Co)
- Founder: Will King
- Headquarters: High Wycombe, Buckinghamshire, England
- Area served: UK, USA, Australia, New Zealand, Brazil, Japan, South Africa
- Key people: Andy Hill (CEO), Will King (Founder), Karen Heygate-Browne (Operations Controller), (Supply Chain Manager), Jane Greenaway (Business Systems).
- Products: King of Shaves
- Production output: Mainly in UK
- Owner: Private shareholders
- Number of employees: 14
- Website: https://www.kingofshaves.com

The King of Shaves Company, Ltd. is a British toiletries company headquartered in Beaconsfield, Buckinghamshire, England. The King of Shaves brand was founded in 1993 by Will King. The company was demerged from Knowledge & Merchandising Inc. Ltd. on 1 June 2009. It is owned by The King of Shaves Holding Company Ltd.

== History ==
Will King founded Knowledge & Merchandising Inc., Ltd. (KMI) the company which owned the King of Shaves brand in 1993.

In 2009, The King of Shaves Company Ltd. was demerged from KMI, and the company appointed Atul Sharma as CFO and Chris Outram as Non-Executive Chairman of both The King of Shaves Company Ltd. and KMI (now KMI Brands Ltd).

Since 2009, King of Shaves has used a business model similar to that used by Coca-Cola, with a central office controlling research and development, whilst production and point of sale is localized to a specific market. The success of this model has varied. Though in 2009 the company's merchandise was stocked in at least 7 separate countries, from 2007 the turnover went from £13.9 million, to £25 million in 2008, to £10 million by 2012.

On 22 June 2009, the company announced a "Shaving Bond" issue of up to five thousand £1,000 non-transferable and non-convertible bonds, which was reported in the press and described by Will King as being an "innovative way to potentially raise money from up to 5,000 brand enthusiasts". The issue was overseen by FSA regulated accountancy firm BDO Stoy Hayward with legal advice provided by Memery Crystal LLP.

In October 2011 The King of Shaves Company signed a multi-year agreement with Spectrum Brands Holdings Inc, owner of Remington branded electrical grooming products, to exclusively distribute King of Shaves products in the US and Canada. The distribution agreement was dissolved in 2012 after 'breaches of contract' by Spectrum Brands.

On 27 October 2014 it was announced that Will King would be stepping down as CEO, with Andy Hill appointed as the new CEO.

== Razors and blades ==
King of Shaves launched a 4-blade razor (called the Azor) in the UK in late 2008. They launched a 5-blade razor (called the Azor 5) in the UK in early 2011. The cartridges featured blades manufactured by Kai Industries in Japan (a shareholder in King of Shaves). The Azor 5 was discontinued in early 2014 and was replaced by the Hyperglide system razor. All the razors have been designed and manufactured in the UK, with cartridges developed in collaboration with Kai.

== Mergers and acquisitions ==
In March 2008 KMI acquired the issued share capital of Floraroma Ltd., which owns women's toiletries brands including Phil Smith, Delicious Beauty, Dead Sea Source, Little Me, Derma-Mum and Floracologie. In October 2009, KMI acquired the Naked skincare brand.

== Criticism ==
In 2009 the company offered savings bonds with 6% pa interest rate to consumers. These savings bonds rely on the company's growth in order to fund the returns. This scheme was not covered by the Financial Services Compensation Scheme and at the time of application consumers were unable to get reports on how well the company was performing.

In 2012 a fresh batch of bonds were released to existing Bondholders only, though the ability to redeem them has been withheld for a number of years, with no change to their status with regulators.

All the bonds were redeemed at the end of their period and investors received all their money back as well as the interest promised.

== Sponsorships ==
King of Shaves has sponsored athletes throughout Great Britain. During 2006 they sponsored John Terry and P1 Offshore Powerboat. later years, they sponsored both Chrissy Palmer for MRF Formula Ford races, but also Jordan King, son of Justin King (former CEO of Sainsbury's), during his F3 races.

2012 saw the company sponsor James Ellington the "eBay" athlete and back the Welsh Extreme 40 catamaran.

During the 2023/24 season, King of Shaves were Coventry City F.C.’s principal partner and front of shirt sponsor.
