= Sid Scholey =

English football manager (1885–1934)

Sidney Victor Scholey (4 September 1885 – 2 December 1934) was an English football manager who managed Walsall in the 1929–30 season.

Scholey was born in Walsall and became trainer of his local club in 1908, remaining at Hilary Street until 1911. In his youth, he was known as a gymnast and wrestler. He also competed in weight-lifting competitions. He then became a masseur at the Marine Hydro in Rhyl, where he treated many famous footballers. He had a spell as trainer at Stockport County before the First World War.

After spending the war in the Royal Army Medical Corps he joined Birmingham City as a trainer in 1920. At the end of his first season with the St. Andrew's club they won the Football League Second Division championship. During the 1927–28 season, he had a brief period as caretaker-manager but left the club shortly afterwards.

He then returned to Hilary Street as trainer before taking over from Jimmy Kerr, who had left to join Norwich City, as manager in April 1929. His first season as manager ended with the club 17th in the Third Division (South) before Scholey resigned in October 1930. His most notable game in charge was an FA Cup tie at Villa Park in January 1930 in front of a crowd in excess of 74,600; Villa won the match 3–1, with the winning goal coming ten minutes from the end of the match.

Scholey died in 1934.
