= Doug King (businessman) =

British businessman and football club owner

- Born: Douglas Richard John King; January 1967 (age 59); Lowestoft, Suffolk
- Education: Loughborough University
- Occupation: Businessman
- Known for: Owner and Executive Chairman of Coventry City
- Title: Owner and Executive Chairman of Coventry City

Douglas Richard John King (born January 1967) is a British businessman and investor, best known as the owner and executive chairman of Coventry City. He became the club’s majority shareholder in January 2023 and shortly afterwards acquired full ownership.

== Early life and career ==
King was born in 1967 in Lowestoft, where he grew up. He graduated with a degree in mathematical engineering from Loughborough University.

He began his career in 1990 with Cargill and was based in Switzerland as a manager of oil trading from 1997 to 2000. After ten years, he left to become head of oil trading for Crown Resources. He also worked as a consultant for Catequil Asset Management in New York between 2003 and 2004. In 2004, he co-founded Aisling Analytics with business partner Michael Coleman, which later changed its name to RCMA Capital LLP.

He served as the chief executive officer of RCMA Capital and has been chairman of RCMA Group since 2010. The company manages The Merchant Commodity Fund and focuses on investing in commodity markets based on analysis of supply and demand dynamics.

Presently, he is associated with companies including RCMA Capital LLP, an investment firm, and Yelo Enterprises, which has been linked to oilseed processing and renewable energy projects.

As in 2026, Doug King’s net worth at around $400 million (around £317m). His brother is Will King `The King Of Shaves`

== Coventry City ==
In November 2022, King agreed to purchase an 85% stake in Coventry City from SISU Capital. The takeover was approved by the English Football League in January 2023. Later that month, he acquired the remaining shares, becoming the club’s sole owner.

Following the takeover, he also assumed the role of chairman and oversaw a restructuring of the club’s financial and operational framework. Under the ownership of King, Coventry City has focused on financial sustainability. He made also investments in football operation and infrastructure.

In November 2024, King made the high-profile decision to part ways with long-serving manager Mark Robins and appointed Frank Lampard as the club's new head coach.

In April 2026, under his ownership, the club achieved a promotion to the Premier League, which was a positive step for the club, reaching thus the highest level of English football.
