= Roy Barry =

Scottish footballer (born 1942)

Personal information
- Full name: Roy Alexander Barry
- Date of birth: 19 September 1942 (age 84)
- Place of birth: Edinburgh, Scotland
- Position: Defender

Youth career
- Musselburgh Athletic

Senior career*
Years	Team	Apps	(Gls)
1961–1966	Heart of Midlothian	94	(8)
1966–1969	Dunfermline	94	(6)
1969–1973	Coventry City	83	(2)
1973–1975	Crystal Palace	42	(1)
1975–1976	Hibernian	36	(0)
1976–1978	East Fife	12	(0)
1978–1979	Nuneaton Borough	2	(0)
Total		361	(17)

Managerial career
- 1976–1978: East Fife
- 1982: Oxford United
- * Club domestic league appearances and goals

Roy Alexander Barry (born 19 September 1942) is a Scottish former professional footballer.

Barry played for Musselburgh Athletic's junior side before being signed by Hearts. He then moved to Dunfermline for £13,000, where he helped the club defeat Hearts in the 1968 Scottish Cup Final. Dunfermline sold him to Coventry City for £40,000, who then sold him to Crystal Palace for £45,000. He later signed for Hibernian and ended his senior playing career at East Fife, who he also managed. Barry later became caretaker manager of Oxford United.
