= England 2006 FIFA World Cup bid =

Football World Cup host nation bid

The England 2006 FIFA World Cup bid was the Football Association's unsuccessful bid for the right to host the 2006 FIFA World Cup. The other bids came from Brazil, South Africa, Morocco and successful bidder Germany.

England hosted the 1966 FIFA World Cup and, had the campaign been successful, would have become the fourth nation to host the World Cup for a second time. The country had also hosted Euro 96 and unsuccessfully attempted to host the 1990 and 1998 World Cups.

Amongst the bid submission delegation were 1966 World Cup winners Bobby Charlton and Geoff Hurst and then-current player Michael Owen.

== Venues ==
To host a FIFA World Cup opening match, semi-final or final, a stadium must be able to hold 60,000 people.

At the heart of the 2006 bid was the new Wembley Stadium, with a capacity of 90,000. Old Trafford in Manchester held 61,000 in 2000, but had plans to expand to 68,400 by the time of the tournament, while the 1997-built Stadium of Light in Sunderland would also grow, from 42,000 at initial construction to 63,000 by 2006. New stadiums, at Ashburton Grove for Arsenal and Stanley Park Stadium for Liverpool, would be built to house over 60,000 fans each, while new grounds with capacities of more than 40,000 would also be built in Coventry (now known as the Coventry Building Society Arena) and Leicester (the Walkers Stadium). The City of Manchester Stadium, construction for which had begun in January 2000, would be used for both the 2002 Commonwealth Games and the 2006 FIFA World Cup as well as becoming the home ground of Manchester City, having been the centrepiece of an unsuccessful Mancunian bid to host the 2000 Summer Olympics.

The other existing stadiums that were nominated were Aston Villa's ground, Villa Park in Birmingham and St James' Park in Newcastle upon Tyne, both holding over 50,000, as well as 40,000-seater stadiums Pride Park in Derby, Leeds' Elland Road, Goodison Park in Liverpool, the Riverside Stadium in Middlesbrough, Hillsborough in Sheffield, and Stamford Bridge in West London.

London			Liverpool	
Wembley Stadium	Emirates Stadium	Stamford Bridge	Stanley Park Stadium	Goodison Park^{a}
Capacity: 90,000	Capacity: 60,400	Capacity: 40,000	Capacity: 60,000	Capacity: 40,000
Manchester		England 2006 FIFA World Cup bid is located in England		
Old Trafford^{a,b}	City of Manchester Stadium	England 2006 FIFA World Cup bid is located in England		
Capacity: 68,400	Capacity: 47,717	England 2006 FIFA World Cup bid is located in England		
Newcastle	Leeds	England 2006 FIFA World Cup bid is located in England		
St James' Park^{b}	Elland Road^{b}	England 2006 FIFA World Cup bid is located in England		
Capacity: 52,000	Capacity: 40,000	England 2006 FIFA World Cup bid is located in England		
Sunderland	Birmingham	England 2006 FIFA World Cup bid is located in England		
Stadium of Light	Villa Park^{a,b}	England 2006 FIFA World Cup bid is located in England		
Capacity: 63,000	Capacity: 47,300	England 2006 FIFA World Cup bid is located in England		
Nottingham	Derby	Coventry	Sheffield	Middlesbrough
City Ground^{b}	Pride Park	Coventry Building Society Arena	Hillsborough^{a,b}	Riverside Stadium
Capacity: 40,300	Capacity: 40,000	Capacity: 40,000	Capacity: 40,000	Capacity: 40,000

^{a}: Stadium used in 1966 FIFA World Cup
^{b}: Stadium used in UEFA Euro '96

== Timeline ==
In 1993, the chairman of the Football Association (the FA), Bert Millichip and his German counterpart agreed that the FA would back Germany's bid for the 2006 FIFA World Cup and that Germany would support England's Euro 96 bid. Both bids were ultimately successful. By 1996, England had withdrawn its support for the Germany bid and decided to make their own bid, losing the support of UEFA president Lennart Johansson in the process. As a result, England put its support behind Sepp Blatter in 1998, rather than rival Johansson, for the FIFA presidency. Blatter had, however, already publicly supported South Africa's bid.

The FA went on to make a series of misinformed decisions to the detriment of the bid. This included FA chief executive Graham Kelly and chairman Keith Wiseman unsuccessfully attempting to remove the Scottish Football Association's David Will from the FIFA executive and replace him with Wiseman, culminating in both Kelly and Wiseman being removed from their posts. The FA, mindful of Thailand's vote on the 24-man executive, offered the Thailand national football team the services of Peter Withe as head coach.

Five companies were names as sponsors of the bid: British Airways, Littlewoods, Marks & Spencer, Nationwide Building Society and Umbro. A press advert was released by Saatchi & Saatchi in May 1998.

In 1999, England arranged a friendly with Malta before Euro 2000, securing England a vote. Later that year, Blatter reaffirmed his support for South Africa, despite a visit from British prime minister Tony Blair.

In April 1999, Bobby Charlton announced that as part of the bid, a dozen children from each of the 203 FIFA-affiliated nations would be guests of the FA during the tournament.

The 1998–99 FA Cup winners, Manchester United, withdrew from the 1999–2000 competition due to their participation in the 2000 FIFA Club World Championship in South America, to take place in early 2000, thus becoming the first FA Cup winners not to defend their title. This was at the request of the FA, which believed it would aid the 2006 bid. Tony Banks, the Minister for Sport, said he believed that the bid would receive "irreparable damage" if United did not partake in the maiden FIFA Club World Championship.

On 9 August 1999, the 2006 bid was presented to FIFA. The bid documentation was designed by Leeds-based firm Elmwood.

In May 2000, the bidding nations had representatives in Malaysia to present to the Asian Football Confederation.

Shortly before the 2000 UEFA Cup Final between English club Arsenal and Turkish side Galatasaray, there were clashes between British and Turkish fans. As well as Arsenal fans, it was reported that followers of English clubs Chelsea and Leeds United, as well as Scottish side Rangers and Welsh teams Cardiff City and Swansea City, had travelled to Copenhagen to engage with the Turks. This incident shocked UEFA deeply. These concerns intensified during Euro 2000, as there were hooligan riots caused by England fans and UEFA's stance against the English bid hardened as a result.

On 3 July 2000, Brazil withdrew its bid and pledged support for South Africa's. On the same day, the English bid was criticised by FIFA for the way in which it was conducted.

On 5 July, the countries made their final presentations to FIFA.

== Results ==
The vote–undertaken in Zürich, Switzerland–took the instant-runoff voting format, where the lowest-placed nation is eliminated and their votes reassigned to their marked second preference, this process continuing for as many rounds as required for two nations to remain.

Results
Nation	Vote		
Nation	Round 1	Round 2	Round 3
Germany	10	11	12
South Africa	6	11	11
England	5	2	Eliminated
Morocco	2	Eliminated	Eliminated
Total votes	23	24	23

New Zealander Charlie Dempsey voted for England in both of the first two rounds, electing to abstain from the final round; Channel 4 News would name him as one of many to receive notes offering presents from members of bidding nations. David Will was the other man to back England twice. The three first-round English votes came from Central America.

== Reaction ==
Andy Anson, the chief executive of the 2018 FIFA World Cup bid, called for humility with England's bid claiming they "must not fall victim to arrogance" and that lessons had been learned from the unsuccessful attempt to host the 2006 competition. Anson stated that "the tone of this campaign has to be different.
