= Bill Moore (footballer, born 1913) =

English footballer and manager

Personal information
- Full name: William Moore
- Date of birth: 1913
- Place of birth: Washington, England
- Date of death: 1982 (aged 69)
- Place of death: Stafford, England
- Height: 5 ft 9 in (1.75 m)
- Position: Defender

Youth career
- Walker Celtic

Senior career*
Years	Team	Apps	(Gls)
1936–1937	Stoke City	4	(0)
1938	Mansfield Town	1	(0)
Total		5	(0)

Managerial career
- 1957–1964: Walsall
- 1969–1972: Walsall
- * Club domestic league appearances and goals

William Moore (1913 – 1982) was an English footballer and manager. He played for Mansfield Town and Stoke City and also managed Walsall over two periods.

== Playing career ==
Born in Washington, Tyne and Wear, Moore played for Walker Celtic in the late 1920s and early 1930s before joining Stoke City for whom he made four appearances for Stoke in defence over two seasons. In 1938 he moved to Mansfield Town and scored a goal against Walsall when playing in the FA Jubilee match in 1939.

== Coaching career ==
After the War Moore was appointed trainer of Notts County, who at the time were managed by former Aston Villa and England forward Eric Houghton. Tommy Lawton and Jackie Sewell were two of the star players under Moore's supervision at Meadow Lane. When Houghton returned to Villa Park as manager, Bill Moore went with him as right-hand man and he played a big part in Villa's FA Cup triumph over Manchester United in 1957.

== Management career ==
In the December following that Wembley victory, Moore was asked to take over from Jack Love as manager of Walsall who had been going through a difficult time and were in deep trouble at the foot of Third Division South. In no time at all he rallied the players, re-election was averted, the Fourth Division title was won in 1960 and 12 months later promotion gained to the Second Division.

After Walsall slipped back into the Third Division in 1963, in the most unfortunate of circumstances, being reduced to nine men in the final game of the season from which they needed a point but ended up going down by two goals to one against Charlton Athletic, Moore left Fellows Park early the following season to take up a scouting position with Fulham. He returned to Fellows Park in February 1969, to succeed Ron Lewin, and over the next three years developed players such as Phil Parkes and Ray Train. But as financial problems loomed large, Moore resigned his post in March 1972 after a disagreement with coach John Smith over a substitution. In later years Moore kept the Bear Inn in Stafford and died in 1982.

== Career statistics ==
Club	Season	League			FA Cup		Total	
Club	Season	Division	Apps	Goals	Apps	Goals	Apps	Goals
Stoke City	1936–37	First Division	2	0	0	0	2	0
Stoke City	1937–38	First Division	2	0	0	0	2	0
Mansfield Town	1938–39	Third Division North	1	0	0	0	1	0
Career total			5	0	0	0	5	0
