= Dick Bayliss =

English footballer and manager

Leonard Richard Bayliss
- Born: 28 April 1899
- Died: 5 April 1947 (aged 47)
- Occupation: Football Manager

Leonard Richard Bayliss (28 April 1899 – 5 April 1947) was an English football manager who managed Coventry City F.C. between June 1945 and his death. Bayliss joined the club as chief scout in 1931 under his predecessor Harry Storer, Jr.

== Career ==
Bayliss was from Alfreton, Derbyshire. He had an undistinguished career as a player making only a handful of appearances in the late 1920s for Luton, Mansfield and Southend.

It was as a scout, however, that Bayliss made his name. He was considered an excellent judge of a player and focussed heavily on bringing young talent up through the youth and reserve teams: "One of the most knowledgeable men in football, Mr. Bayliss was just as popular. He was known in the boardroom of every club in Great Britain and he was practically an automatic choice for the managership of Coventry City" when Harry Storer, Jr. left for Birmingham City F.C.

His spell as manager came at a difficult time, following the end of the Second World War, and he struggled to manoeuvre in the transfer market. Bayliss was popular with the playing staff, a number of whom maintained a bedside vigil in the weeks leading up to his death in April 1947.

Although Bayliss had little time to develop his own team he laid down solid foundations for future managers by developing the youth squad. He died at his home in Coventry at age 47, survived by his wife, Ethel, and his daughter, Ethel.
