= William Stanley (football manager) =

English football player and manager

William Stanley was the first manager (secretary) of Coventry City, then known as Singers FC, from 1883 to 1885. Although little is known of him he is now credited with being the true founder of the club, having organised a team made up of employees from the Singer bicycle factory in Coventry. As a player, Stanley was a centre-forward.

William's nephew was George E. Stanley who was a racer at Brooklands.
