= Doug King (drag racer) =

American drag racer and engine builder

Douglas M. King, nicknamed "Ardun Doug", (May 6, 1937 – September 16, 2011) was an American drag racer and engine builder.

King drove dragsters powered by Ardun hemi-headed flathead V8s. He continued to race as late as 2004.

He also built the Ardun engine for the record-setting Frank Schonig-built 1927 Ford Model T Lakes roadster driven by Luke Balogh.
