= Joe Burchell =

English football manager

Personal information
- Date of birth: April 1873
- Place of birth: Walsall, England
- Date of death: October 1932 (aged 59)

Managerial career
- Years: Team
- 1921–1926: Walsall

Joe Burchell (April 1873 – October 1932) was an English football manager who led Walsall from 1921 to 1926. A former player at Walsall Unity, he became Walsall F.C. club secretary during World War I, and was appointed as manager in August 1921. He resigned in February 1926, following a run of bad results, and was replaced by David Ashworth. Burchell stayed on in his post as secretary until 1931, when he became a publican. He was briefly a director at Hednesford Town, before he died following a short illness in October 1932.
