= Jack Fairbrother =

English footballer (1917–1999)

John Fairbrother (16 August 1917 – October 1999, born in Burton upon Trent, Staffordshire) was an English professional football goalkeeper, best known for his time at Newcastle United shortly after the Second World War where he won a FA Cup winners medal in the 1951 cup final against Blackpool. His uncle George Harrison played for Everton and England.

He became the coach of Maccabi Petah Tikva in 1958, where he stayed until January 1959.

== Honours ==
Newcastle United

- FA Cup: 1950–51
