= James Kerr (football manager) =

English football manager

James Kerr (died 18 February 1933) was an English football manager. During his nine-year career as a manager, he coached Walsall, Coventry City and Norwich City.
