= 1996–97 Hartlepool United F.C. season =

Hartlepool United
1996–97 season
- Chairman: Harold Hornsey
- Manager: Keith Houchen (player-manager until 4 November); Mick Tait (player-manager from 4 November)
- Stadium: Victoria Park
- Third Division: 20th
- FA Cup: First round
- League Cup: First round
- Football League Trophy: First round
- Top goalscorer: League: Allon/Cooper (9); All: Allon (11)
- Average home league attendance: 2,107
Home colours

During the 1996–97 English football season, Hartlepool United F.C. competed in the Football League Third Division.

== Season summary ==
In the 1996–97 season, Hartlepool started the campaign with wins over Colchester United and Fulham, but Houchen's playing career came to an end after the fifth game of the season, against Wigan Athletic, when he retired due to a persistent knee injury. Houchen continued to bemoan referring decisions which seemed to consistently go against Hartlepool. This in turn led to continued punishments from the FA over his use of foul language towards officials. With Hartlepool on a poor run of results at the foot of the table, he left the club by mutual consent on 4 November 1996. His assistant Mick Tait led the club to a 20th-place finish, and organised a benefit match for Houchen against Middlesbrough, which raised £23,000.

There was also a change of ownership in 1997, when Harold Hornsey sold the club to an oil company called IOR.

== Final league table ==
Pos	Team	Pld	W	D	L	GF	GA	GD	Pts
18	Darlington	46	14	10	22	64	78	−14	52
19	Doncaster Rovers	46	14	10	22	52	66	−14	52
20	Hartlepool United	46	14	9	23	53	66	−13	51
21	Torquay United	46	13	11	22	46	62	−16	50
22	Exeter City	46	12	12	22	48	73	−25	48

Rules for classification: In the Football League goals scored (GF) takes precedence over goal difference (GD).

== Results ==
Hartlepool United's score comes first

=== Results summary ===
Overall								Home						Away					
Pld	W	D	L	GF	GA	GD	Pts	W	D	L	GF	GA	GD	W	D	L	GF	GA	GD
46	14	9	23	53	66	−13	51	8	6	9	33	32	+1	6	3	14	20	34	−14

=== Results by matchday ===
Round	1	2	3	4	5	6	7	8	9	10	11	12	13	14	15	16	17	18	19	20	21	22	23	24	25	26	27	28	29	30	31	32	33	34	35	36	37	38	39	40	41	42	43	44	45	46
Ground	A	H	H	A	A	H	H	A	H	A	A	H	H	A	A	H	H	A	A	H	A	A	H	A	H	H	A	H	A	H	A	H	H	A	H	A	A	H	A	H	A	H	H	A	H	A
Result	W	W	D	L	W	L	D	L	W	L	L	L	D	L	L	L	L	W	W	D	L	W	W	L	W	D	D	L	L	W	L	L	D	L	L	D	L	L	L	W	L	W	L	W	W	D
Position	2	1	1	4	3	7	8	11	7	10	11	14	15	20	22	23	23	22	19	21	23	18	17	19	17	15	16	18	18	16	18	17	17	19	21	20	21	22	23	22	23	23	23	22	18	20

Source: InTheMadCrowd
A = Away; H = Home; W = Win; D = Draw; L = Loss

=== Legend ===
Win	Draw	Loss

=== Football League Third Division ===
Date	Opponent	Venue	Result	Attendance	Scorers
17 August 1996	Colchester United	A	2–0	2,942	Allon, McAuley
24 August 1996	Fulham	H	2–1	2,457	Cooper, Davies
27 August 1996	Mansfield Town	H	2–2	2,750	Cooper, Ingram
31 August 1996	Leyton Orient	A	0–2	4,342	
7 September 1996	Hereford United	A	1–0	2,729	Halliday
10 September 1996	Carlisle United	H	1–2	3,077	Cooper
14 September 1996	Wigan Athletic	H	1–1	2,433	Cooper
21 September 1996	Hull City	A	0–1	3,886	
28 September 1996	Chester City	H	2–0	2,042	Allon, Cooper (pen)
1 October 1996	Doncaster Rovers	A	1–2	1,471	Beech
5 October 1996	Cambridge United	A	0–1	3,406	
12 October 1996	Darlington	H	1–2	3,799	Halliday
15 October 1996	Swansea City	H	1–1	1,310	Halliday
19 October 1996	Barnet	A	0–1	2,265	
26 October 1996	Exeter City	A	0–2	3,043	
29 October 1996	Northampton Town	H	0–2	1,254	
2 November 1996	Brighton & Hove Albion	H	2–3	1,683	Mike, Cooper
9 November 1996	Scarborough	A	4–2	3,157	Howard, Clegg, Halliday (2)
23 November 1996	Torquay United	A	1–0	1,856	Allon
30 November 1996	Exeter City	H	1–1	1,419	Irvine
3 December 1996	Scunthorpe United	A	1–2	1,778	Clegg
14 December 1996	Rochdale	A	3–1	1,618	Beech, Howard, Allon
21 December 1996	Lincoln City	H	2–1	1,344	Cooper (pen), Sunderland
26 December 1996	Carlisle United	A	0–1	6,947	
28 December 1996	Hereford United	H	2–1	1,923	Allon, Howard
1 January 1997	Hull City	H	1–1	1,944	Beech
11 January 1997	Chester City	A	0–0	1,885	
18 January 1997	Doncaster Rovers	H	2–4	1,708	Howard, Cooper (pen)
25 January 1997	Northampton Town	A	0–3	5,039	
1 February 1997	Scarborough	H	1–0	1,843	Cooper
8 February 1997	Brighton & Hove Albion	A	0–5	8,412	
11 February 1997	Cardiff City	H	2–3	1,120	Beech (2)
15 February 1997	Torquay United	H	1–1	1,548	Beech
22 February 1997	Cardiff City	A	0–2	2,971	
1 March 1997	Scunthorpe United	H	0–1	1,300	
4 March 1997	Wigan Athletic	A	2–2	3,229	Halliday, Howard
8 March 1997	Lincoln City	A	1–2	2,915	Allon
15 March 1997	Rochdale	H	1–2	1,448	Beech
22 March 1997	Fulham	A	0–1	7,222	
29 March 1997	Colchester United	H	1–0	2,725	Beech
31 March 1997	Mansfield Town	A	0–1	2,229	
5 April 1997	Leyton Orient	H	3–1	2,576	Bradley, Baker, Halliday
12 April 1997	Cambridge United	H	0–2	3,186	
19 April 1997	Darlington	A	2–1	4,662	Brown, Allon
26 April 1997	Barnet	H	4–0	3,070	Allon (2), Baker, Halliday
3 May 1997	Swansea City	A	2–2	5,423	Howard (2)

=== FA Cup ===
Round	Date	Opponent	Venue	Result	Attendance	Goalscorers
R1	16 November 1996	York City	H	0–0	3,011	
R1R	26 November 1996	York City	A	0–3	3,257	

=== League Cup ===
Round	Date	Opponent	Venue	Result	Attendance	Goalscorers
R1 1st Leg	20 August 1996	Lincoln City	H	2–2	2,073	Davies, Allon
R1 2nd Leg	3 September 1996	Lincoln City	A	2–3 (lost 5–6 on agg)	2,389	Allon, Beech

=== Football League Trophy ===
Round	Date	Opponent	Venue	Result	Attendance	Goalscorers
NR1	10 December 1996	Burnley	H	0–2	921	

== Squad ==
Note: Flags indicate national team as defined under FIFA eligibility rules; some limited exceptions apply. Players may hold more than one non-FIFA nationality.

No.	Pos.	Nation	Player
—	GK	ENG	Paul O'Connor
—	GK	ENG	Stephen Pears
—	DF	ENG	Michael Barron (on loan from Middlesbrough)
—	DF	ENG	Russell Bradley (on loan from Scunthorpe United)
—	DF	ENG	Glen Davies
—	DF	ENG	Stephen Hutt
—	DF	ENG	Denny Ingram
—	DF	ENG	Darren Knowles
—	DF	ENG	Graeme Lee
—	DF	ENG	Sean McAuley
—	DF	ENG	Ian McGuckin
—	MF	ENG	Chris Beech
—	MF	ENG	Michael Brown (on loan from Manchester City)
—	MF	ENG	David Clegg
—	MF	ENG	Mark Cooper
—	MF	ENG	Jon Cullen
—	MF	ENG	Andy Elliott

No.	Pos.	Nation	Player
—	MF	ENG	Kona Hislop
—	MF	ENG	Chris Homer
—	MF	FRA	Alain Horace
—	MF	ENG	Richard Lucas
—	MF	SCO	Chris McDonald
—	MF	ENG	Mark Proctor
—	MF	ENG	Jon Sunderland
—	MF	ENG	Mick Tait
—	MF	ENG	Paul Walton
—	MF	ENG	Craig Winstanley
—	FW	ENG	Joe Allon
—	FW	ENG	Paul Baker
—	FW	ENG	Stephen Halliday (footballer)
—	FW	ENG	Keith Houchen
—	FW	ENG	Steve Howard
—	FW	ENG	Stuart Irvine
—	FW	ENG	Adie Mike (on loan from Stockport County)

== Sources ==
- Strange, Jonathan (2006). A Tenner and Box of Kippers: The Story of Keith Houchen. Stadia. ISBN 978-0-7524-3796-5.)
