= Keith Houchen =

English footballer and manager

Personal information
- Full name: Keith Morton Houchen
- Date of birth: 25 July 1960 (age 66)
- Place of birth: Middlesbrough, England
- Height: 6 ft 1 in (1.85 m)
- Positions: Forward; attacking midfielder

Youth career
- 1977–1978: Chesterfield

Senior career*
Years	Team	Apps	(Gls)
1978–1982	Hartlepool United	170	(65)
1982–1984	Leyton Orient	76	(20)
1984–1986	York City	67	(19)
1986	Scunthorpe United	9	(2)
1986–1989	Coventry City	54	(7)
1989–1991	Hibernian	57	(11)
1991–1993	Port Vale	49	(10)
1993–1996	Hartlepool United	109	(27)
Total		591	(161)

Managerial career
- 1995–1996: Hartlepool United (player-manager)
- * Club domestic league appearances and goals

Keith Morton Houchen (born 25 July 1960) is an English former professional footballer and football manager. A forward, he scored 184 goals in 687 league and cup games.

He started his professional career at Hartlepool United in February 1978, after failing to win a contract at Chesterfield. He was coached by Billy Horner to become a strong centre-forward, using his natural strength and power to retain possession in attacking positions. Financial difficulties forced the club to sell him to Leyton Orient for £25,000 in March 1982. After failing to impress in his two years in London, he was moved to York City for £15,000 in March 1984. He played seven games in the club's Fourth Division title-winning season in 1983–84 before transferring to Scunthorpe United for £40,000 in March 1986. He did not settle at the club, but in the summer, he was fortunate enough to win a £60,000 move up through three tiers to First Division side Coventry City.

Though never a prolific player for the "Sky Blues", he scored a spectacular headed goal in the 1987 FA Cup final at Wembley, which earned him Match of the Day's Goal of the Season award. He featured in the 1987 FA Charity Shield, but he faded from the first-team picture at Highfield Road. In March 1989, he joined Scottish Premier Division side Hibernian for a fee of £325,000. He returned to England in August 1991 when he was sold to Port Vale for £100,000. After falling out with manager John Rudge, he returned to Hartlepool on a free transfer in June 1993. He was appointed as player-manager in April 1995 but endured a tough time at Victoria Park and left the club in November 1996. He later coached at the Middlesbrough Academy and entered the property market.

== Career ==
=== Early years ===
Keith Morton Houchen was born in Middlesbrough to Ken and Vernie Houchen, who both worked in social clubs. He grew up some five minutes from Ayresome Park. He grew up with three brothers; Jimmy, Dennis, and Patrick, who all joined the Coldstream Guards; and one sister, Jackie. He attended St Mary's College as a youth. A promising athlete and gifted footballer, as a youngster, he travelled to London for a trial with Crystal Palace along with John and Terry Fenwick, but was told he was too lightweight at the time. After an unsuccessful trial with Aston Villa, he became an apprentice at Chesterfield in 1977.

=== Hartlepool United ===
He was not offered a professional contract at Chesterfield by manager Arthur Cox and so left the club without making a senior appearance at Saltergate. However, he was soon spotted playing amateur football in Nunthorpe by Hartlepool United manager Billy Horner. Houchen joined the "Monkey Hangers" on non-contract terms before turning professional in February 1978, signing a one-year contract on £30 a week. When he arrived at the Victoria Park, Hartlepool were a struggling Fourth Division club. He made his debut in a 1–1 home draw with Crewe Alexandra. Though grateful for the opportunity and training, Houchen lamented that "we used to have a mad rush to the bank to cash our cheques. Only about six of them would go through, and the rest would bounce." He scored his first senior goal against Barnsley on 24 March 1978. He scored further goals against Darlington, Rochdale and Newport County to end the 1977–78 campaign with four goals in 13 games. He played regular first-team football in 1978–79 and scored 13 goals in 42 games to become the club's top scorer. He then went on to score 14 goals in 44 games in 1979–80, as the club finished 19th, just two points above the re-election zone. His goalscoring record attracted the attention of bigger clubs; however, club chairman Vince Barker told Reading that even if Houchen were available then they would not be able to afford him. His exploits continued into the following season, and the club rejected bids of up to £80,000 from Plymouth Argyle and Cardiff City. He scored 17 goals in 48 appearances in 1980–81, yet again becoming the club's top scorer, as Hartlepool were in the promotion hunt until a late spell of bad form sent them down the table to ninth. He hit 19 goals in 38 games in 1981–82 to become the club's top-scorer for a fourth consecutive season. However, having scored 65 goals in 170 league appearances, Houchen wanted a move to a bigger club at a higher division; he regularly handed in transfer requests, but the club ignored all.

=== Leyton Orient ===
Hartlepool United were in dire financial straits by March 1982, and were £60,000 in debt to the Inland Revenue. This crisis at the club allowed Leyton Orient manager Ken Knighton to take Houchen to Brisbane Road for a bargain price of £25,000. He signed a four-year contract on £225 a week with a £1,000 signing on fee. He scored one goal against Chelsea in 14 appearances, as the "O's" finished in last place and were relegated out of the Second Division in 1982. He missed the start of the 1982–83 campaign due to injury, but managed to hit ten goals in 38 games by the end of the season. His ten goals included one against Sheffield United on the last day of the season, in a win which kept Orient in the Third Division. He scored ten goals in 34 games in 1983–84, but was not highly rated by new boss Frank Clark. For his part, Houchen said that Clark "would shout, and rant and rave, and tactically he wasn't particularly brilliant." He handed in a transfer request, which was accepted.

=== York City ===
On 22 March 1984, York City manager Denis Smith signed Houchen for a £15,000 fee, later saying that "anybody who could score sixty-five goals playing for Hartlepool must have something". He signed a two-year contract on £225 a week. He scored on his debut against Aldershot at the Recreation Ground, despite missing a penalty; he replaced Steve Senior in the second half, who had broken his leg. The "Minstermen" went on to win the Fourth Division championship by a 16-point margin, with Houchen featuring mostly as a substitute in the final seven games. With John Byrne and Keith Walwyn forming an effective striking partnership, Houchen played as an attacking midfielder. He hit a hat-trick in a 7–1 thrashing of Gillingham at Bootham Crescent, and also converted a penalty that he had won to knock Arsenal out of the FA Cup at the fourth round. He scored a total of 18 goals in 45 appearances in 1984–85 to become the club's top scorer. However, injuries helped to limit him to eight goals in 38 games in 1985–86, and he decided to accept a move back down to the Fourth Division.

=== Scunthorpe United ===
He was sold to Scunthorpe United for £40,000 in March 1986, signing a contract of £250 a week and receiving a car and an ex gratia payment of £10,000. Houchen later said that "it was the only time I ever gave up... it wasn't the right club because it wasn't going anywhere... I said to Yvonne, 'I'm just going to take the money'". In doing so he rejected moves to Preston North End and Third Division Bury. He quickly regretted the move, and despite getting along well with manager Frank Barlow he found himself hating everything at the club, from the supporters to the Old Showground itself.

=== Coventry City ===
After 97 days with the "Iron" he moved on to Coventry City for a £60,000 fee, after impressing in a reserve team game between the two clubs. The management team of George Curtis and John Sillett offered Houchen £350 a week, £50 an appearance, a £10,000 signing-on fee, as well the chance to play First Division football. He struggled with injuries at the start of the 1986–87 campaign but recovered to ensure his name went down in the club's history for his exploits in the FA Cup. He bagged five goals in their 1986–87 cup-winning run, the first being the winning goal away at Old Trafford against Alex Ferguson's Manchester United. He then scored two against Sheffield Wednesday in the quarter-finals, and one against Leeds United in the semi-finals, both games being held at Hillsborough. The final and most famous goal of the run came in the 1987 FA Cup final in front of 98,000 spectators at Wembley Stadium in a 3–2 win over Tottenham Hotspur. However, Houchen almost missed the match after catching food poisoning from a trout caught by reserve goalkeeper Jake Findlay. The goal came from a Dave Bennett cross. It was an instinctive full-stretch diving header that was impossible for Ray Clemence to save. It levelled the score at 2–2 on 63 minutes, and an own goal from Gary Mabbutt in extra time won the game for Coventry. As well as his FA Cup winning medal, Houchen's header also earned him the BBC Match of the Day's Goal of the Season award for the 1986–87 season. This was due to the acrobatic effort involved and partly due to the incredible run he had made from deep midfield to meet the crossed ball. It is generally considered as one of the most famous goals scored at Wembley, and certainly the best headed goal.

"I never took my eyes off the ball. I ran looking over my shoulder, watching the ball on the turn, running, running, so if it came, that was where I went... I couldn't honestly say to you that I was consciously thinking that if the ball comes in I can dive and head it – it's all instinct. I think all football is instinct and the only way I could get on the end of the ball was to throw myself. It all finishes up as perfect timing – the perfect ball, the perfect run – but in a lot of ways it's a fluke. When it is all perfect timing, it is like a dance – it all comes together. I do remember actually heading it. I knew I was getting it, I knew I was going to get a good head on it, and you do think in the split second, 'Don't head it wide, don't head it over, don't miss-head it.'... I headed right past him [Clemence], right in the corner. It was past him before he could move, so it was just the perfect header."

— Houchen recalls the moment that made his name synonymous with the FA Cup.

Ironically, manager John Sillett spent much of the money from Coventry's FA Cup run (£750,000) on Chelsea striker David Speedie, who would replace Houchen in front of goal. Sillett's one consolation to Houchen was that he would play him in the 1987 FA Charity Shield, which ended in a 1–0 defeat to Everton. The 1987–88 season was poor for both club and player, as illness, injury and competition from Speedie, Gary Bannister and Cyrille Regis restricted Houchen to just three goals and 24 appearances. On 14 August 1988, he was selected by Graham Taylor to represent the Football League in a game against Scunthorpe United to celebrate the opening of Glanford Park; Houchen scored once in a 6–1 victory. He scored just twice in 16 appearances in 1988–89, though one of these goals was the winner against Midlands rivals Aston Villa in a 2–1 Boxing day victory at Highfield Road. He also featured as a substitute in the infamous 2–1 defeat to Conference club Sutton United at Gander Green Lane. The result was all the more remarkable considering that Coventry went on to finish seventh in the league and that Houchen was one of ten Coventry players that day who had won the FA Cup less than two years previously.

=== Hibernian ===
In March 1989, he took a £325,000 transfer to Scottish Premier Division side Hibernian, banking a £65,000 signing-on fee. He had come close to signing for Queens Park Rangers, but was not willing to move to London following his experience with Orient. He scored on his debut in a 2–1 defeat to Edinburgh rivals Hearts at Tynecastle. A further goal against Aberdeen gave him two goals in eight games at the end of the 1988–89 campaign. He hit 12 goals in 39 games to become the club's top scorer in 1989–90, including two in wins over Rangers at Easter Road and Ibrox, and one in Europe against Hungarian side Videoton. "Hibs" exited the UEFA Cup at the second round following defeat to Belgian club Liège. Already riled by a telling-off from manager Alex Miller, Houchen had a run-in with his own supporters following a defeat to Raith Rovers at Stark's Park. Following this confrontation, he was singled out for abuse at Easter Road. He made his last appearance for the club in a Scottish Cup game against St Johnstone, during which he was sent off for kicking Tommy Turner. Houchen later said that he liked Scotland but did not enjoy Scottish football, and was particularly critical of the standard of refereeing; referees were unwilling to punish fouls from defenders but quick to brandish cards for attackers who reacted poorly to being kicked.

=== Port Vale ===
In August 1991 he returned to England with a £100,000 move to Port Vale; he was one of three new arrivals, along with Peter Swan (who took him in as a lodger) and Martin Foyle. He scored a brace against Wolverhampton Wanderers at Molineux on 3 September, but tore his hamstring later in the month. He finished 1991–92 with five goals in 24 games, and went on to help the "Valiants" to win the TNT Tournament in the summer. The club finished bottom of the Second Division, though the introduction of the Premier League meant that they were demoted to the Third Division, which was immediately re-branded as the Second Division. He scored six goals in 28 league games in 1992–93, and did not feature in the Football League Trophy final or the play-off final. He fell out with manager John Rudge, and the two stopped speaking to each other. Houchen later admitted that "I should have knocked on the door and said, 'This is stupid'".

=== Return to Hartlepool ===
He left Vale Park on a free transfer in June 1993 and turned down a move to Cyprus club AC Omonia to return to former club Hartlepool United. Injury meant he did not play for the man who signed him, Viv Busby, and instead he made his second debut for the club under John MacPhail. Houchen went on to score eight goals in 37 games as Hartlepool were relegated to the bottom tier of the Football League in 1993–94, finishing a massive 17 points behind Blackpool, who were one point above the relegation zone. MacPhail was quickly sacked and replaced by David McCreery; MacPhail blamed the fact that the club was sometimes unable to pay the player's wages as a reason for poor results on the field. Houchen was a coach at the club, but quickly fell out with temporary 'advisory coach' Sandy Clark. Houchen scored a hat-trick against Bury, though was later sent off in the match for allegedly swearing at referee Kevin Lynch; at the time of the incident Houchen was receiving treatment for knee ligament damage which would keep him out of action for six weeks. McCreery resigned on 20 April 1995, and chairman Harold Hornsey appointed Houchen as his replacement; he became the 23rd manager at the club in 38 years. He appointed his former boss Billy Horner as youth team coach and also employed Brian Honour and Mick Tait. His first game in charge was a 4–0 home win over Hereford United, and a 3–0 defeat at Preston North End and a final day 3–2 victory over Mansfield Town ensured Hartlepool an 18th-place finish. As a player, he was the club's top scorer with 14 goals in 39 appearances in 1994–95, and was voted Player of the Year by the club's supporters.

The 1995–96 season was to be his only full season as a manager. He scored six goals in 41 games, leading "Pools" to a 20th-place finish on a budget of £260,000 a year. His team were beaten 8–0 by Arsenal over two legs in the League Cup and – more worryingly – were beaten 8–0 by Crewe Alexandra in the Football League Trophy. He sold Nicky Southall to Grimsby Town for £40,000 and spent the same amount on striker Joe Allon. He proved a disappointment, and both Allon and Houchen were sent off against Gillingham on 28 October. Houchen's final career goal came in a 3–0 win over Bury on New Year's Day.

He released goalkeeper Brian Horne, who he described as a "fat slob"; this proved to be an unpopular move with "a lot of nasty people who support Hartlepool... who purport to support this club [but] would rather back fat professional players than people who really care about Hartlepool United". As his replacement he signed Stephen Pears from Liverpool, as well as young defenders Glen Davies and Chris McDonald, teenage winger David Clegg, Exeter City midfielder Mark Cooper, and Blackpool midfielder Chris Beech. Hartlepool started the 1996–97 campaign with wins over Colchester United and Fulham, but his playing career came to an end after the fifth game of the season, against Wigan Athletic, when he retired due to a persistent knee injury. He continued to bemoan refereeing decisions which seemed to go against Hartlepool consistently. This in turn led to continued punishments from the FA over his use of foul language towards officials. With his team on a poor run of results at the foot of the table, he left the club by mutual consent on 4 November 1996. His assistant Mick Tait led the club to a 20th-place finish, and organised a benefit match for Houchen against Middlesbrough, which raised £23,000.

"I had to walk away from all that nonsense. I didn't deserve it. I'd put too much into the club to be treated like that. I'd put in so many hours. I'd tried and tried to get it going. I thought, 'I just can't stand it.'... The whole ground was singing 'Houchen Out'. I was standing behind the dug-out and thinking, 'I don't need this'... I felt very, very let down by the supporters of Hartlepool United Football Club... There are a lot of shit people following every club. They are everywhere, that type, with brains the size of a pea. I wouldn't keep the players they wanted, players who were patently not good enough and were really, really bad professionals... the majority of them [supporters] are nasty people. There are more of them at Hartlepool than elsewhere – without a shadow of doubt."

— After his last game in charge, a defeat to Brighton & Hove Albion, a gang of Hartlepool supporters stayed after the match to demand Houchen's dismissal – he remained resentful of these individuals long after leaving the club.

== Style of play ==
Houchen was a big 6 ft 1 in (1.85 m) centre-forward who had strength and power. Early in his career, he broke his ribs and backbone, but learned the tricks of the trade, such as interlinking arms with opposition players to prevent them from jumping. Billy Horner compared him with Malcolm Poskett, and stated the only quality missing in Houchen's game was aggression. Horner and his coaching team of George Smith and Willie Maddren taught Houchen how to protect himself from the highly physical centre-halves that dominated the division, and the youngster learned how to hold the ball up and bring other players into the attack.

== Personal life and post-retirement ==
He married his wife, Yvonne, on 17 July 1982. The couple had two children: Cara and Ross (born 19 April 1987). They now live in Thirsk, North Yorkshire. He is the uncle of politician Ben Houchen. After retiring as a player, Houchen spent his time coaching at schools and the Middlesbrough Academy, collecting football statistics for the Press Association, and renting out properties.

He was a supporter of Margaret Thatcher. He appeared as one of the players selected for the new Wembley Stadium's 'Walk of Fame' before the venue's first FA Cup final in May 2007. A 256-page biography of his footballing career entitled A Tenner and a Box of Kippers, written by Jonathan Strange, was published in 2006. After reading the book, Houchen admitted that his comments about Hartlepool United came across as "a bit harsh".

== Career statistics ==
=== Playing statistics ===
Appearances and goals by club, season and competition
Club	Season	League			FA Cup		League Cup		Other		Total	
Club	Season	Division	Apps	Goals	Apps	Goals	Apps	Goals	Apps	Goals	Apps	Goals
Hartlepool United	1977–78	Fourth Division	13	4	0	0	0	0	0	0	13	4
Hartlepool United	1978–79	Fourth Division	39	13	1	0	2	0	0	0	42	13
Hartlepool United	1979–80	Fourth Division	41	14	1	0	2	0	0	0	44	14
Hartlepool United	1980–81	Fourth Division	45	17	1	0	2	0	0	0	48	17
Hartlepool United	1981–82	Fourth Division	32	17	2	0	2	1	3	0	39	18
Hartlepool United	Total		170	65	5	0	8	1	3	0	186	66
Leyton Orient	1981–82	Second Division	14	1	—		—		—		14	1
Leyton Orient	1982–83	Third Division	32	10	2	0	1	0	3	0	38	10
Leyton Orient	1983–84	Third Division	30	9	1	0	2	1	1	0	34	10
Leyton Orient	Total		76	20	3	0	3	1	4	0	86	21
York City	1983–84	Fourth Division	7	1	—		—		—		7	1
York City	1984–85	Third Division	35	12	5	3	3	2	2	1	45	18
York City	1985–86	Third Division	25	6	6	0	3	1	2	1	36	8
York City	Total		67	19	11	3	6	3	4	2	88	27
Scunthorpe United	1985–86	Fourth Division	9	2	—		—		—		9	2
Coventry City	1986–87	First Division	20	2	5	5	0	0	1	0	26	7
Coventry City	1987–88	First Division	21	3	0	0	2	0	1	0	24	3
Coventry City	1988–89	First Division	13	2	1	0	1	0	1	0	16	2
Coventry City	Total		54	7	6	5	3	0	3	0	66	12
Hibernian	1988–89	Scottish Premier Division	7	2	1	0	—		—		8	2
Hibernian	1989–90	Scottish Premier Division	29	8	3	3	3	0	4	1	39	12
Hibernian	1990–91	Scottish Premier Division	21	1	2	1	2	1	0	0	25	3
Hibernian	Total		57	11	6	4	5	1	4	1	72	17
Port Vale	1991–92	Second Division	21	4	1	0	2	1	0	0	24	5
Port Vale	1992–93	Second Division	28	6	1	0	1	0	2	0	32	6
Port Vale	Total		49	10	2	0	3	1	2	0	56	11
Hartlepool United	1993–94	Second Division	34	8	1	0	1	0	1	0	37	8
Hartlepool United	1994–95	Third Division	32	13	1	0	4	1	2	0	39	14
Hartlepool United	1995–96	Third Division	38	6	0	0	3	0	0	0	41	6
Hartlepool United	1996–97	Third Division	5	0	0	0	2	0	0	0	7	0
Hartlepool United	Total		109	27	2	0	10	1	3	0	124	28
Career total			591	161	35	12	38	8	23	3	687	184

=== Managerial statistics ===
Managerial record by team and tenure
Team	From	To	Record					Ref
Team	From	To	P	W	D	L	Win %	Ref
Hartlepool United	20 April 1995	4 November 1996	73	19	17	37	26.0	
Total			73	19	17	37	26.0	—

== Honours ==
York City

- Football League Fourth Division: 1983–84

Coventry City

- FA Cup: 1986–87

Individual

- Match of the Day's Goal of the Season Award: 1986–87
- Hartlepool United Player of the Year: 1994–95
