= John Sunderland =

John Sunderland may refer to:

- John William Sunderland (c. 1896–1945), English Labour Party politician, Member of Parliament for Preston July–November 1945
- Sir John Sunderland (businessman) (fl. 2000s), President of the Confederation of British Industry (CBI)

== See also ==
- Jon Sunderland, English footballer
