= History of Coventry City F.C. =

History of an English football club

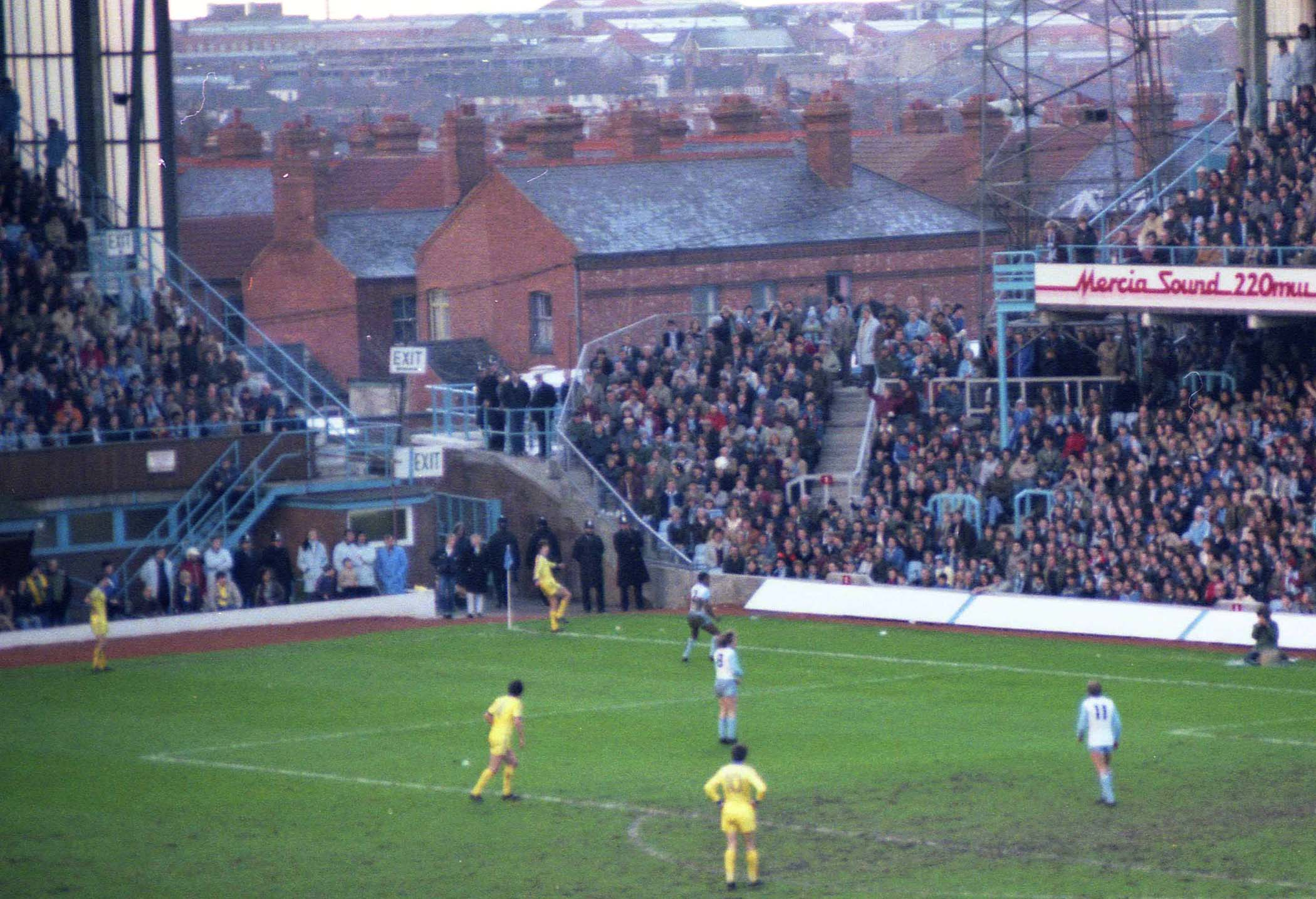
Coventry City playing at Highfield Road Stadium in 1982.

Coventry City Football Club is an English association football club based in Coventry in the Midlands. The club was founded in 1883 as Singers F.C. by Willie Stanley, an employee of cycle firm Singer Motors. In 1898, the name was changed to Coventry City. The club first joined the Football League after World War I and in 1938, the club missed out on promotion to the First Division by one point.

Since the 1960s, the club has been nicknamed 'the Sky Blues' dedicated to the colour of their kit introduced by manager Jimmy Hill. Arriving in 1961, Hill and club chairman Derrick Robins led a revival of the club's fortunes which culminated in promotion to Division One in 1967. During their promotion season, the club went 25 games undefeated and reportedly attracted a crowd of over 50,000 spectators for a match with Wolverhampton Wanderers.

The city remained in the top tier of English football for over 30 years, winning the 1987 FA Cup under John Sillett, and in 1992, they became founding members of the Premier League. At the end of the 2000–01 season, they were relegated to the FL Championship. Since then, the club has been relegated twice more, experienced a change of ownership and, between 2013 and 2014, was temporarily forced to groundshare with Northampton Town.

== 1883–1898: Singers F.C. ==
The earliest known organised football club in Coventry was Stoke F.C., founded in the suburb of the same name in 1869. The team did not play regularly and games were played under a variety of football rules, with some being closer to rugby union than Association football. The first association football club in the city was established by Coventry Wanderers Cricket Club in 1874. The Wanderers changed their name to Coventry Association F.C. in 1876.

By the late 1870s rugby had become dominant in the area, fuelled by the sport's popularity in local public schools such as Bablake and Rugby. Association football was reintroduced with the arrival of the bicycle industry in the city, and an influx of workers from Birmingham and the Black Country. In the 1880s each of the factories set up a football team. It was at one of these factories, that of the Singer Cycle Company, that Coventry City F.C. was born.

The club was founded in 1883 by William Stanley, an employee of the factory, and initially known as Singers F.C. Stanley convened a meeting at the Lord Aylesford Inn in Hillfields, with colleagues from the factory in Canterbury Street including "Little Harry" Banks, George Bowers, Harry Hathaway, "Cock" Heath, Frank Moseley, Andrew Poole, and "Shiner" Turner. The club's first headquarters was the White Lion in Gosford Green and they began playing matches at pitch in Stoke called Dowells Field. The Singers Cycle Company founder, George Singer, became the first president of the club. Singers played around forty games in their first four years, which were basic in nature, lacking a regular playing staff and sometimes missing equipment such as goal nets. They joined the Birmingham County Football Association and the played opponents from across the Midlands including Hinckley, Langley Green and Small Heath. Admission to the games was free at that time, and players covered their own expenses.

In 1887 Singers appointed J.G. Morgan as club secretary, and he oversaw a transformation of the club into a serious operation. Morgan was the first official at the club who did not play and fulfilled a role similar to a modern manager. Singers relocated from their original pitch at Dowells Field to an enclosed ground called Stoke Road, located just to the south of the future Highfield Road location. The ground had a small stand and entrances close to the White Lion and Binley Oak pubs, where an admission fee of two pence was charged. The club played an organized fixture list for the first time in the 1887–88 season and also entered the Birmingham Junior Cup, reaching the semi-final. The following five seasons have been described by club historians as a "golden age", as the club's performances and attendances, as well as the quality of their opponents, improved steadily. Capitalising on the renewed interest in football within the city, Rudge F.C., attached to the rival Rudge Cycle Company, began to achieve their own success. Singers and Rudge developed a fierce rivalry, fuelled by competition between the two bicycle companies. Games between the two clubs attracted crowds as high as 4,000 by the end of the 1880s.

Singers began the 1890–91 season with a new center-forward, Frank Mobley, regarded as one of the club's best players of the nineteenth century. Singers won their first trophy at the end of the season, defeating the Willenhall Pickwick 1–0 in the final of the Birmingham Junior Cup. They following season was even more successful with only four defeats and twenty-six wins from their thirty-four games, as well as a cup treble: the team lifted the Wednesbury and Walsall Cups as well as successfully defending the Birmingham Junior Cup. After returning to Coventry from the final of the last, another victory over Willenhall at Perry Barr stadium, many fans turned out to welcome them home. Local businessman David Cooke, who would later become the club's chairman, produced a "Three Cups Tobacco" to celebrate the event. The future seemed bright for the club, but financial problems at the cycle factory forced a number of top players to depart in the summer of 1892. Mobley, the previous season's hero, was among the departees, leaving for Small Heath where he went on to enjoy a successful First Division career.

Despite a slump in form as a result of losing their best players, Singers continued to develop administratively through the 1890s. The club became professional in 1892 but the status was largely symbolic as many players remained amateur and the professionals only received expenses and match fees. It was still a "shop club" which meant that only Singers factory employees were permitted to play. They entered the FA Cup for the first time in 1892 and began to play a full league fixture list from 1894, competing in the Birmingham and District League with games against the strong reserve sides of established Midlands clubs including Aston Villa and West Bromwich Albion. There was a perennial proposal through the decade to change the club's name, given the growing support from Coventry residents not connected with the cycle factory. Club president George Singer, who was also mayor of Coventry in the early 1890s, favoured calling the club after the city but there was insufficient support within the club administration. The proposal finally gained the necessary support in 1898 as another slump in the factory's fortunes highlighted the desirability of distancing the football team from the company. Despite a last-minute objection from Coventry Rugby Club, who felt that the name was too similar to their own, the name change to Coventry City Football Club was approved by the Football Association (FA) on 12 August 1898.

== 1898–1919: Non-league years as Coventry City ==
The club's first season as Coventry City was not a very successful one, with the opening game lost 5–0 to Wellington Town and no victory recorded until six games into the campaign. This was the last season at Stoke Road, as the land was earmarked for a housing development to accommodate Coventry's rising population. Building work began on Highfield Road in early 1899 but the cost of building the new stadium put the club into a perilous financial situation. The club decided not to pay its players for the last few games of the season, which led to a strike. Despite a 1–0 win over Shrewsbury Town in the opening game, the first season at Highfield Road was disastrous and the club finished bottom of the Birmingham Junior League. The financial problems and disputes with players continued and the 1900–01 season proved even worse than the previous, with 102 goals conceded and a 14–0 defeat to Aston Villa reserves representing the biggest defeat in the club's history. The following season was also a poor one, including a 10–2 FA Cup defeat to Worcester-based Berwick Rangers. A better season followed in 1902–03 with a seventh-place finish, but it was a brief reprieve and in 1905 the club had to re-apply for its membership of the Birmingham Junior League for a third time in five years.

The club restructured itself in the summer of 1905, in a bid to reverse the long run of poor performance. The board was replaced by a "syndicate", headed by Frank Lee, with Joe Beaman taking over training duties. New players were added, including goalkeeper–captain Harry Whitehouse and Jimmy McIntyre, an inside-left who would later become the club's manager. The following two seasons were much more successful. The change of management was not completely flawless, as the club's previous board made a complaint to the FA. The resulting investigation found shortcomings in the management of the club, and the syndicate was fined £10. Acting on the FA's advice, they registered the club as a limited company in 1907. Shares worth five shillings were sold, yielding a capital return of £2,000. Lee became secretary of the new entity, while Thomas Owen was named as chairman.

Following the addition of several more new players the 1907–08 season was Coventry's best so far, as they reached the first-round proper of the FA Cup for the first time. They won six qualifying matches in the cup run, including a 7–1 win over Bishop Auckland. In the first round they played Crystal Palace of the Southern League, losing 4–2 in front of 10,000 supporters. In the league City finished in fourth place, scoring 97 goals, with an 11–2 win over West Bromwich Albion reserves the highlight. The stars of the side was Albert Lewis, who was described by the Coventry Evening Telegraph as the club's best player of the Birmingham Junior League era, and Billy Smith, scorer of forty goals. After the season finished Coventry applied to join the Southern League, which at the time was regarded as the third-best division in the country with clubs of a similar stature to those of the Football League's second division. Crystal Palace, who had been impressed by City's performance and supporters in the FA Cup game, were vocal in support for the application and it was duly accepted on 27 May 1908.

Coventry City struggled in their first season of Southern League football, partly because their election was confirmed too late for them to sign new players suitable for the new level of football and because star-player Lewis left the club. They finished second-bottom of the league and escaped relegation only because of an expansion from twenty to twenty-two teams. In the middle of the season the club adopted a nickname for the first time, becoming the "Bantams" in a reference to their light-weight status as newcomers to the Southern League. David Cooke joined the board in mid-1909 and provided funds for City to invest in new playing staff. After another poor start to the season their fortunes changed with the signing of Patsy Hendren, a player who became better known as a cricketer, going on to play the sport for England. Coventry were challenging for the Southern League title at Christmas and went on to reach the FA Cup quarter final, beating top-flight teams Preston and Nottingham Forest before losing to Everton. They reached the third round in 1910–11 and also achieved their only title in the Birmingham Senior Cup with a 1–0 win over Stourbridge. The 1911–12 season was relatively successful, with a sixth-place finish, but City were beaten heavily in the FA Cup by Manchester United, making their first appearance at Highfield Road.

The club then entered suffered a slump in fortune. They finished thirteenth in 1912–13 and financial pressure led to the cutting of the professional staff from 24 to 18. The following season they finished bottom of the league and were relegated to division two of the Southern League. The quality of teams was much lower and Coventry had some big victories in the 1914–15 season but the finances of the club were once more in grave danger. The club tried unsuccessfully to join the Football League's second division and came close to extinction in the summer of 1915. They were saved in part by the decision to abandon the upcoming FA Cup and Southern League seasons because of World War I. Although no football was played for the next few years City still had liabilities and in 1917 had to be rescued by David Cooke, who paid off the debts and began replenishing the club's staff. Seeking to make the step up to the Football League after the war, the club played regular friendly matches against local clubs such as Aston Villa during 1918 and then negotiated a place for itself in the 1918–19 Football League Midland Section, a temporary wartime division operating while the main league was suspended. The rules allowed guest players and City made use of two internationals based in Coventry during the war – England's Jesse Pennington and Scotland's George Chaplin. The division was somewhat amateurish due to the absence of many players but Coventry acquitted themselves well, winning games against top-flight Nottingham Forest, Sheffield Wednesday, and Huddersfield Town. In early 1919 they made a speculative application for league status and were successful, topping the ballot and gaining entry to the second division when full-time football restarted in 1919–20.

== 1919–1931: Early Football League ==
Recognizing the need to strengthen the playing squad and the administration of the club, the club made a number of investments in preparation for league football. Among the new signings were George Chaplin, who joined permanently had played in the wartime team, and inside-forward Alec Mercer of Bury. Highfield Road was upgraded, with a new capacity of 40,000. Despite these improvements, the club's first twelve years in the Football League were mostly disastrous, both on and off the field. Beginning with a 5–0 defeat against Tottenham Hotspur, City lost their first ten games in 1919–20 and failed to record a win until Christmas Day. William Clayton, manager since 1917, resigned a few months into the season. The club's form improved somewhat under the new boss Harry Pollitt but, with one game remaining, City still remained in danger of finishing in the bottom two and having to seek re-election. In the season's final game, City came from behind to beat Bury 2–1 in front of a then-record 22,000 crowd. The win ensured the club's safety and meant Lincoln City lost their league place. The match became infamous, as it transpired some years later that Coventry and Bury had colluded to rig the game. The FA set up an enquiry in 1923 which concluded "The Commission is satisfied that an arrangement was made between Bury and Coventry allowing the latter to win". Both clubs received a heavy fine, along with life bans from football for several officials including David Cooke and later, in 1925, Harry Pollitt.

Pollitt had left City in the 1920 close season and was replaced by Albert Evans. Evans signed some exciting new players such as Jerry Best and Jimmy Dougall but 1920–21 followed a similar pattern to the last. They spent most of it in last place and were saved only through a run of six wins and two draws in their final nine games. In 1921–22 they switched in the latter part of the season to a new-look kit which ditched the traditional blue and white for red-and-green halves, but remained poor on the field, escaping relegation by one point. Eighteenth- and nineteenth-place finishes followed in the subsequent two seasons and in 1924–25, facing their sixth relegation battle in a row, Coventry finally succumbed and were relegated to the Third Division North. It looked for a while as if they would stage another dramatic escape, climbing out of the relegation zone in March, but the form was not sustained and they slipped back to last place. Evans left the club in November 1924 and at the end of the season James Kerr was named as his replacement.

The club reverted to their traditional blue-and-white colours at the beginning of 1925–26 but this did not inspire a reversal in the ongoing slump. Coventry spent one season in Division Three North and their poor form led to a decline in attendance to less than 1,000, the lowest in the league era. They finished in sixteenth place and were eliminated from the FA Cup in an embarrassing defeat to Midland League side Worksop. Stoke City and Stockport County were relegated into Division Three North that season and Coventry, being a Midlands team, were asked to move to Division Three South to keep the numbers even. This switch meant that some years later they were could claim the distinction of being the only club to appear in every division of the Football League – First, Second, Third, Third–South, Third–North, and Fourth. The move of leagues had little effect on their performance as they continued to struggle for the next two seasons. In 1927–28 heavy defeats of 9–1 and 7–0, to Millwall and Watford respectively, followed by a first-round FA Cup exit to Bournemouth & Boscombe Athletic caused Kerr to resign. Lamenting the uninterrupted poor form since World War I, Evening Telegraph's columnist Derek Henderson, who wrote under the pseudonym "Nemo", wrote that "successive managements have either lacked the ambition or the ability to provide us with anything other than a third-rate team". Some fans began to call for the club to be wound up, allowing for a phoenix club to rise in its place. Coventry ended the season close to the bottom of the league, and in danger of having to seek re-election. In their final game at Northampton, they lost to a dubious goal and the fans began rioting. Ultimately they finished twentieth and narrowly avoided having to seek re-election, but morale was at an all-time low.

The last manager of the 1920s was former-player Jimmy McIntyre, who took over the reins for the start of the 1928–29 season. McIntyre made several new signings and City finally began to enjoy greater success on the field. At Christmas they were in contention for the title, although they failed to maintain the same form in the latter half of the season and finished tenth. The next year they were again in contention, but were unable to overhaul runaway league leaders Plymouth, despite inflicting the Devon side's first defeat of the season around Christmas. The on-field performances had improved, but there were problems behind the scenes. Walter Brandish became the club's chairman in 1928 and began a bitter battle for control with rival W. Carpenter. McIntyre also fell out with the board, accusing them of meddling in team management. Meanwhile, the lack of success but heavy outgoings in the 1920s, coupled with some poor transfer decisions by McIntyre, had left the club heavily in debt. The effects of this were felt in 1930–31 with a disappointing league season and an early cup exit. McIntyre resigned, citing irreconcilable differences with the board, and Harry Storer was installed in his place.

== 1931–1946: The "Old Five" era ==
In contrast with the non-stop struggles of the 1920s, the 1930s went on to become one of Coventry's most successful decades. The city itself was growing in economic strength, in contrast to the Great Depression taking place elsewhere. The on-field success was attributed to new manager Harry Storer, who was managing his first club following a notable playing career in which he made two international appearances for England and also played first-class cricket. Before the start of the 1931–32 season he signed Clarrie Bourton and Jock Lauderdale, both of whom would go on to have storied careers with the club. Bourton, in particular, was an instant success and other clubs became interested in signing him a few months into the season. Reversing the previous trend of selling star players to help with the club's debt, the board resisted the temptation to sell him and he remained with the club. 1931–32 was also the season in which future star George Mason made his debut for the club, as Storer began building the side which would take the club to a new level. Coventry scored a total of 108 goals that season, scoring five or more in many games, which led to the nickname "The Old Five" for the team of that era. Bourton's individual tally of 49 goals was the Football League record for 1931–32, and his overall total of 50 remains the club record. The club would have to wait a few more seasons for promotion, but there was a renewed optimism.

1932–33 was another solid season, with Coventry finishing in sixth place and Bourton scoring 40 league goals. Then, in 1933–34, the club had its first genuine chance of promotion since dropping down to the third tier. They finished in second place, and scored over 100 goals for a third season in a row, setting a new league record. Coventry also recorded their largest ever league victory in April 1934, with a 9–0 against Bristol City. This tally included four goals from Clarrie Bourton. In 1934–35 City won their opening four games, and were top of the league table until after Christmas. The season finished less well, with the final seven games including only one win, as City finished third, but more players were added who would go on to make a long-term impact. This included Leslie Jones, whose swift impact on the team made him a summer target for Tottenham Hotspur. Coventry rejected a £6,000 bid for him in the summer.

In 1935–36 the club were finally, after several seasons of near-misses, promoted back to the Second Division, winning the Division Three South championship with another 100-goal season. With three games remaining the battle for promotion was between Coventry and Luton Town, with the two teams having to play each other home and away. Both games ended in dramatic draws, the Highfield Road encounter being played in front of a gate of 42,975 with many more refused entry. The final game against Torquay United was another thriller as George McNestry's second-half penalty was saved, and the team fell behind with fifteen minutes remaining in the game. With Luton drawing their final game, it seemed like promotion would be missed once again. The situation was rescued as Coventry equalised with another penalty, this time taken by Ernie Curtis, and they went on to win the game through a Clarrie Bourton goal with three minutes remaining. After the final whistle 10,000 fans invaded the pitch in celebration.

The club made a solid start to life back in the second division, with an eighth-place finish in 1936–37. This was accompanied by off-field improvements such as the construction of a new main stand and the purchase of the freehold to Highfield Road, made possible by a loan of £20,000 from local motor-industry entrepreneur John Siddeley. The season marked the first time Coventry met with local-rivals Aston Villa in league football, and supporters were rewarded with a win and a draw as well as a higher-placed finish than the Birmingham club. In 1937–38 they performed even better, being undefeated for the first fifteen games and finishing fourth, one point behind promoted Manchester United. They again finished fourth in 1938–39. But difficulties had started to emerge, particularly in the attack, which failed to replicate the free-scoring of the division three era. Several top players, including Bourton, were sold, as City sought to pay off its debts and balance the books, which led to some fan dissatisfaction.

There was little transfer activity in the summer of 1939, due to the deteriorating political situation in Europe and the 1939–40 league season was aborted after only a few games with the start of World War II. Many fans at the time believed that the war had robbed the team of a probable promotion to the first division, although there was some evidence that the team was already beginning to decline by 1939. Coventry continued playing some friendly games until November 1940, when the Coventry Blitz damaged the stadium and brought all football in the city to a halt. Friendly matches resumed again in 1942, as parts of Highfield Road had been rebuilt, and the team joined the Midland Regional League. The only player connected with the club to be killed during the war was Arthur Bacon, who had played for City until 1935, but the successful team of the 1930s would nonetheless not reform. Harry Storer left to manage Birmingham City in 1945, while players such as William Morgan, Jack Astley, and George Taylor retired from the game.

== 1946–1958: Post-war slump ==
After the conclusion of World War II, league football resumed in 1946. Harry Storer was replaced as manager by Dick Bayliss, who had been his assistant, and some pre-war players, such as George Mason and Harry Barratt and goalkeeper Alf Wood, remained with the club. Another returnee was George Lowrie, who had been signed in 1939 and would go on to become the club's leading centre-forward. City finished eighth in 1946–47 and established a reputation for being difficult to beat. They suffered a major setback when Bayliss, who was returning from a scouting mission to Scotland, became stranded in a snowstorm in Yorkshire. He became seriously ill and died in April 1947. He was replaced by Billy Frith, who guided the club to another mid-table finish in 1947–48. The following season started disastrously, with City losing ten of their opening sixteen games and Frith was dismissed in November 1948. Storer was persuaded to leave Birmingham and return to Coventry, and had an instant effect with the team winning the first five games of his second spell and going on to escape relegation. This feat, following his earlier success with the club, enhanced his popularity with the club's supporters.

The 1949–50 season started very badly for Coventry, with just one win in the first twelve games and conceding large numbers of goals. The signing of defender Martin McDonnell led to a temporary improvement, but another poor run in the new year left the club facing relegation. Once again, the club had to spend their way out of danger; the signing of Bryn Allen and Ken Chisholm inspired a successful last eight games and a mid-table finish. By contrast, the following season started very well and the club were top of Division Two table at Christmas. They made several expensive signings, including full-back Terry Springthorpe and striker Tommy Briggs, but these players had no impact at the club and a run of poor performance in the new year ended their promotion hopes. Despite a reasonable start to the 1951–52 season, this poor form resumed from September as an ageing City team – the average was 31 years – faced almost certain relegation by February. Despite several signings, the club were relegated back to Division Three South with a final-day defeat at Leeds United.

The return to third-tier football led to a dramatic decline in attendance at Highfield Road, with average gates dropping from 22,000 to 13,000. This placed a strain on the club's finances, and they were forced to sell winger Norman Lockhart to Aston Villa for £15,500. They finished in a reasonable sixth-place in their first season in the division but poor form returned in the 1953–54 campaign. With the club lying in the bottom half of the table, manager Harry Storer left in early November. According to the club he had resigned, but Storer himself described his departure as a sacking. The team was run by the board for two months, after which Jack Fairbrother took over as manager. In April 1954 a new board was elected following a contentious annual general meeting. The new board was led by Erle Shanks and also featured Derrick Robins, who would later go on to become a highly influential figure in the club. Fairbrother signed some new players in the close season and the 1954–55 season started brightly with six wins in seven games, but they then failed to win in the following five. Fairbrother then left the club on 27 October, officially for health reasons – his wife had been killed in an accident earlier in the year and he had been under considerable stress. But newspaper reports at the time suggested that he may have been ousted by the board as a result of the club's recent downturn in form.

In January 1955 the club announced that Jesse Carver was to be the new manager, a role he began in June of that year with George Raynor as his assistant. Carver had achieved success with several clubs in Italy, including Juventus, Torino, and Roma, and began life at Coventry with the goal of taking the club to Division One. There was huge anticipation and optimism amongst the supporters that summer and a crowd of almost 25,000 attended the opening game against Bournemourth. The first part of the season was mixed, with good results at home offset by a poor away record. Carver signed forward Ken McPherson and, following a five consecutive wins, the club were challenging for promotion by the end of the year. On 30 December, however, the board made a shock announcement that Carver was to leave the club. They cited health reasons for his departure, and chairman Shanks insisted at the press conference that he was not leaving to pursue opportunities overseas. But, within days, Carver announced that he was to become the new Lazio manager and it was later revealed that he had been unhappy in the Midlands and seeking a move back to Italy since September. Raynor took over as manager until the end of the season.

In January 1956 Coventry played a controversial match against the four-time Argentinian champions San Lorenzo de Almagro. San Lorenzo were touring Europe, including games in Spain, France, and Italy, as well as the UK, but were not used to the winter conditions and the routine deterioration of English pitches through the season at the time. They arrived in Coventry having lost all their games in the UK thus far, to Brentford, Rangers, Sheffield Wednesday, and Wolverhampton Wanderers (Wolves), the last featuring altercations with the referee. Trouble flared up again at Highfield Road, as Coventry were awarded a controversial penalty before half-time. San Lorenzo's José Sanfilippo, a future Argentina international, reacted by kicking the referee, Arthur Ellis, and then refusing to leave the field when sent off. Ellis then called the game off. There was better news for Coventry later in the season as goalkeeper Reg Matthews was called up to the England national team and George Curtis, who would go on to become a Coventry legend as player and manager, made his debut at the age of 17. After the conclusion of the season, City appointed Harry Warren as the replacement permanent manager for Carver, the club's sixth in just five years.

Warren's first season in charge was not a success, as once again a promising start was followed by a slump. Warren favoured a more physical style of play, rather than the continental system used by his predecessor. Raynor, who felt that he should have been given the managerial position full-time, left the club in November 1956 and then they lost star goalkeeper Reg Matthews, who was bought by Chelsea for £22,000, a record fee for a goalkeeper at the time. Poor form and injury meant the club finished in 16th place, with gates down from 20,000 at the start of the season to just 5,000 by the end. 1957–58 proved even worse: Warren was dismissed in September following a poor start, to be replaced by Billy Frith, returning for a second spell in charge, but form did not improve and City finished 19th. The league was to be reorganised at the end of the season, an idea originally proposed by Coventry themselves, with the two regional third divisions replaced by a single nationwide third and a new fourth division. City were placed in the latter following their bottom-half finish, consigning them to their lowest tier of football since joining the Football League.

== 1958–1967: Rise to the top ==
Despite an early-season blip, which saw Coventry occupy their lowest-ever league position of 91st after three games, the club's stay in Division Four limited to just one season. Finances were extremely tight but Frith made some shrewd low-cost signings, including Irish international Reg Ryan, Alan Daley, and Accrington's George Stewart. When the club's goalkeeper, Jim Sanders, broke his leg in September Frith persuaded 44-year-old Alf Wood, who played his first game in 1938 and had returned to the club as a trainer, to take his place. Wood played ten games, of which the team lost only one, before being replaced with the signing of Arthur Lightening. Frith's tactics paid off, and City were promoted in second place, behind Port Vale. Coventry's good form continued in the 1959–60 season, and they were a contender for a second-successive promotion until Easter. But a run of three defeats in the final matches meant that they missed out. Once more in a perilous financial situation, Coventry started 1960–61 poorly with only four wins in the first sixteen games. They rallied in the middle part of the season, but another poor run consigned them to a poor finish. The most significant aspect of the season was that Walter Brandish was replaced by Derrick Robins as club chairman; it was under Robins' chairmanship that the club's fortunes were transformed.

The 1961–62 season marked the beginning of what would later be called the "Sky Blue revolution", as Jimmy Hill replaced Frith as manager in December. The first months of the season were amongst the worst in the club's history, as the club lacked a consistent centre-forward. The nadir came with a second-round FA Cup defeat to King's Lynn, an amateur side from the Southern League; Frith and his team were dismissed four days later, although it later transpired that Robins' decision to appoint Hill had been made before the King's Lynn game. Hill immediately began changing things within the club, introducing Monday training to allow for more rest at the end of the week before Saturday matches, training in the afternoon, and allowing players to speak to the media. Despite initial optimism over Hill's arrival, performances on the field remained poor through the rest of the season and City finished in 14th place. For the supporters it seemed like yet another false dawn under a new manager, and attendances dropped to just 6,000. But Hill, with strong support from Robins, was already planning for the following season.

Coventry began 1962–63 with a raft of changes instigated by Hill. This included a change of strip, to a sky-blue colour, with City becoming the first club in England to wear shirts and shorts with a matching colour. The change of colour came with an associated nickname change, the "Bantams" moniker being dropped in favour of the "Sky Blues", and Hill wrote the "Sky Blue Song", sung to the melody of the "Eton Boating Song", which was still being sung at matches by Coventry supporters fifty years later. They made a number of new signings such as Peterborough's Terry Bly and John Sillett from Chelsea, made possible by a £30,000 injection of funds by Robins. The club did not achieve promotion that season, with a fourth-place finish, but had their most successful run in the FA Cup for many years, beating Bournemouth, Millwall, Lincoln, Portsmouth, and Sunderland en route to a quarter-final defeat by Manchester United. The fifth round match again Sunderland was one of the most-attended games ever at Highfield Road; the official figure was just over 40,000 but, with many fans entering the stadium through three gates which were broken down, it is likely to have been closer to 50,000. In April, Hill bought a new striker, George Hudson, as a direct replacement for Terry Bly. The decision was highly controversial with supporters and the press, as Bly had already scored twenty-seven goals in his debut season and was already a crowd favourite at Highfield Road. But Hill believed Hudson to be a better long-term fit for the team he wished to build, playing up front alongside Ken Hale and Bly was effectively frozen out. Hudson was an instant success, scoring a hat-trick on his debut, while Bly was sold to Notts County later in the year and the remainder of his career was largely unsuccessful.

The next season, 1963–64, Coventry finally achieved promotion back to Division Two. The star of the team was Hudson, who scored twenty-one goals before Christmas, and City were nine points clear at the top of the table by January. They then suffered a reversal of fortune, going eleven games without victory, and by February the lead was down to just one point. Hill made some changes, including the emergency signing of George Kirby as a controversial replacement for the temporarily-out-of-form Hudson. City appeared to have missed out on promotion when they lost 2–0 at Peterborough in April, but they were saved by some poor results for their rivals and a winner by the returning Hudson in a final-day victory over Colchester, giving them the championship. The club's first two seasons back in the second tier resembled the pre-war seasons of 1936–37 and 1937–38: in 1964–65 they started very well, briefly going top of the table after five games, but eventually finishing with a solid mid-table finish. Then, in 1964–65, followed a genuine promotion challenge as Coventry missed out by a point. Hill courted controversy once more by selling George Hudson during the season to Northampton for £29,000. New signings during this time included goalkeeper Bill Glazier and striker Ian Gibson, while local player and future manager, Bobby Gould, began to appear regularly in the side.

Having narrowly missed out the previous season, Coventry were promoted to Division One in 1966–67. After a solid start, they suffered a loss of form and were in tenth place in November. Hill angered supporters yet again by dropping their favourite striker, in this case Ian Gibson. After a defeat at Carlisle, Gibson and Hill had an altercation in the dressing room and Gibson was dropped and transfer-listed on his own request. As the club continued to slide, Hill and Gibson eventually made up and the forward was returned to the side for a 3–2 win over Cardiff, in which he scored twice. The team then achieved a run of twenty-five straight games without defeat, with Gibson playing a vital role in the revival. Promotion was confirmed in April when rivals Blackburn drew at home to Bolton, but Division Two title was still at stake as Coventry played their penultimate game of the season against Wolves, who were also already promoted. The match, played on 29 April 1967, attracted the largest crowd in Highfield Road's history with an official gate of 51,455 and probably many thousands more who were not counted. Dubbed the "Midlands Match of the Century" by Hill, the game was dominated by Wolves for the first hour, and the visitors led 1–0 at half time. It was Coventry's day, however, as Ian Gibson created two goals and scored one to record a 3–1 victory. This was followed up with a City win and a Wolves defeat on the final day, giving Coventry the championship.

== 1967–1975: Early top-flight years and European football ==
Excitement grew amongst the supporters through the summer of 1967, ahead of the team's first-ever season in the top flight. But two days before the first game, the board made announced that Jimmy Hill was resigning from the club to work for London Weekend Television. He had been planning the move for most of the summer, but the news was a complete surprise to the public, and Hill had continued to talk of his plans for the First Division in interviews. The Evening Telegraph's Derek Henderson ("Nemo"), who broke the story, ascribed Hill's departure to his constant desire to pursue new challenges. In his 1968 book about the club's history, Henderson wrote "like a mountaineer who climbs his mountain just because it is there, [Hill] has to go on and seek another mountain to conquer". Hill remained in charge for the first few games of the 1967–68 season, standing down on 12 October when the club appointed Noel Cantwell as his successor. Hill went on to have a successful career in broadcasting, which included the hosting of the BBC's Match of the Day programme from 1973 to 1989.

Coventry struggled in their first season in Division One, hindered by a broken leg to George Curtis in the second game, and by January they were at the bottom of the table, with just 16 points from 25 games. They began to recover from February with league wins over West Bromwich Albion, Chelsea, and Sheffield Wednesday, although they were eliminated from the FA Cup by Tranmere. On 6 March 1968 a large fire broke out in the main stand, destroying half the seats as well as melting the Second Division championship trophy. Despite this, the home game against Manchester United went ahead ten days later, with more than 47,000 supporters present as Coventry beat the previous season's champions and soon-to-be-crowned European cup winners 2–0. Coventry entered the last game of the season knowing that they would be safe from relegation if they matched the result of Sheffield United. They drew 0–0 with Southampton while United were defeated against Chelsea, securing the first of ten last-day escapes in their top-flight years. The 1968–69 season proceeded almost identically to the previous, with the club managing only fourteen points in twenty-five games by February. They fought back again, and finished their games outside the relegation zone, but cup-finalists Leicester had five games remaining and would send Coventry down if they achieved seven points. They only managed five, and City were safe again.

Despite the media and bookmakers predicting another season of struggle, Coventry recorded their most successful league season ever in 1969–70, securing a sixth-place finish. The Sky Blues took eight points from a possible ten in the first five games, and recorded a record total of ten away wins in the campaign, including a 3–1 win at second-placed Derby, which Brian Clough described as "brilliant". The top-six finish earned Coventry a place in the European Fairs Cup for the 1970–71 season, and supporters optimistically thought the club had a genuine chance of winning the competition. The European campaign started well, with an easy win over two legs against Trakia Plovdiv, but a 6–1 defeat in Germany against Bayern Munich effectively ended the campaign after two rounds. City salvaged some pride in the second leg, as 26,000 supporters watched them beat the Germans 2–1 at Highfield Road. Their league form also slumped, as they finished in tenth place with just 37 goals scored, and they were beaten in the FA Cup by Third Division club Rochdale. One bright spot on the season was the home game against reigning-champions Everton, which Coventry won 3–1. The game featured a "donkey kick" goal, in which Willie Carr flicked a free-kick backwards with both feet to Ernie Hunt, who scored. The goal won the BBC Goal of the Season award, but the technique was outlawed at the end of the season. City's form dipped further in 1971–72, as they finished 18th and were beaten in the FA Cup in a home game against Hull City. Noel Cantwell was sacked in March 1972, following a run of eleven winless games. He had achieved some success with the club but lamented "the ghost of Jimmy Hill", which he said followed him on the job.

Three months after Cantwell's departure, Joe Mercer and Gordon Milne were appointed as joint managers of the club. City had offered the job to Brian Clough, who said that he had been very tempted to take it, but he instead opted to remain at Derby. They started out the 1972–73 season with the existing squad, seeking to play in what Mercer called "the attractive way". But after failing to win any of the first six games, they began a series of transfers to reshape the team. Notable incoming players included Colin Stein and Tommy Hutchison, both of whom would go on to become highly popular with the supporters, while Jeff Blockley was sold to Arsenal for a club-record £200,000. The changes worked, as City went eight games unbeaten, including a 2–0 win at Arsenal featuring a much-lauded Hutchison goal. They also progressed to the FA Cup quarter final for the third time, but a poor performance at Wolverhampton Wanderers ended that run. League form also suffered and the club finished 19th. The following season started brightly, and wins at home to Liverpool, Manchester City and Derby put City in the top five after ten games. They progressed to the quarter-final of the League Cup and the fifth round of the FA Cup, but suffered narrow defeats in both. The league ended disappointingly again with a 16th-place finish. The club were plunged into financial difficulties in 1974. They purchased Larry Lloyd from Tottenham for £240,000, with Mick McGuire and Jimmy Holmes due to be sold in the other direction for £200,000, but the latter deal fell through after the former was already completed and Coventry faced a huge deficit. Derrick Robins left the club in April 1975 due a relocation to South Africa, ending a fifteen-year career at the helm which had transformed the club's history. Joe Mercer left his management position to become a club director at the same time, leaving Milne in sole charge of the team. On the field it was an indifferent season, with patchy league form and an early exit from both cups.

== 1975–1983: Return of Jimmy Hill ==
Robins' replacement as chairman was Sir Jack Scamp, a local industrial relations expert who had previously chaired Rugby Town F.C. Scamp remained in the role for two years before being replaced by Phil Mead. More significant, however, was the return of Jimmy Hill to the club as managing director, which was announced at the end of the 1974–75 season. It was not initially clear what Hill's role would be, and his Coventry City duties were combined the job with his ongoing television and consultancy work, but his arrival was greeted with less optimism than when he had first joined the club in 1961. The 1975–76 season saw a similar pattern to the previous, but supporters were shocked when star midfielder Dennis Mortimer, who had been with the club since the age of fifteen, was sold to arch-rivals Aston Villa for £175,000. The fans, who had assumed Mortimer would be the player around whom the team was built, were outraged at the apparent lack of ambition at Coventry, and the sale proved to be poor value as Mortimer went on to have a stellar career and captaincy at Villa, culminating in victory in the 1982 European Cup Final.

After a few seasons without serious danger of relegation, and despite the arrival of influential players Terry Yorath and Ian Wallace, City struggled in 1976–77. A run of poor form after the new year left them in serious trouble, and they were in the bottom three going into the final game at home to Bristol City. Sunderland, Bristol and Coventry were level on points, and all battling to avoid one relegation spot, but with Coventry on the lowest goal difference. With five minutes left in the game at Highfield Road the score was 2–2, which would leave Bristol City certain of safety but Coventry facing the drop if Sunderland avoided defeat. At that point, however, news came through that Sunderland had lost their game at Everton, which meant that a draw would be sufficient for both Coventry and Bristol City to avoid the drop. Both teams' managers informed the players of the situation, and they played out the final minutes without any attempt to score further goals. Sunderland lodged a complaint and the Football League conducted an enquiry into the situation, but Coventry were eventually exonerated.

The 1977–78 season was a complete contrast, with a change in tactics by Gordon Milne, switching to an attacking 4–2–4 formation. The tactic meant City conceded more goals than previously, but with Yorath and Barry Powell as anchors in midfield, Hutchison and new signing Ray Graydon on the wings, and Wallace and Mick Ferguson as strikers, the attack were more than able to compensate. Coventry finished seventh, narrowly missing out on qualifying for Europe for a second time. A run of injuries led to a less successful campaign the following season, with a tenth-place finish. The club acquired new players Gary Gillespie and Steve Hunt for relatively low prices, both of whom would go on to enjoy success at the club. Despite their recent financial problems, Coventry attempted to make the first-ever £1 million signing, of Trevor Francis, but the Birmingham striker elected to move to Nottingham Forest instead. A bid for Ipswich defender Kevin Beattie fell through over concerns about the player's fitness. The club's form suffered further in the 1979–80 season as they fell to fifteenth place in the league table, and exited the FA Cup in the fourth round to Third Division Blackburn. Phil Mead retired at the end of the season and Jimmy Hill, who had also acquired significant shareholdings in the club, was elevated to the chairmanship.

During the close-season Coventry sold Ian Wallace to Nottingham Forest for a fee of £1.25 million, using the proceeds to fund a new sports centre at the club training ground in Ryton-on-Dunsmore. They also negotiated a sponsorship deal with Talbot, and attempted to rename the club to "Coventry Talbot". This proposal was rejected by the FA. The highlight of the 1980–81 season was a League Cup run which started with a win over Manchester United in the opening round, City winning both legs 1–0. By February the club had reached the semi-final of the competition, and were also enjoying league and FA Cup success, but the final months of the season were a disaster. They lost to West Ham United in the League Cup, through a late goal, to Tottenham in the FA Cup fifth round four days later, and then league form deserted them as they lost seven out of the next eight games. Only a late-season rally prevented City being sucked into the relegation fight. The poor form led Coventry to relieve Milne of his managerial duties, although he remained at the club in the role of general manager. Dave Sexton, who had previously managed Chelsea, Manchester United and Queen's Park Rangers was appointed as Milne's replacement.

In the summer of 1981 Highfield Road was converted into an all-seat stadium, the second in the United Kingdom after Aberdeen's Pittodrie Stadium. Explaining the development, Hill cited the rise of hooliganism, saying "you can't be a hooligan sitting down". The capacity was reduced to just 20,500, a figure well below average attendances in the late 1960s. In the second game after the development visiting Leeds supporters ripped up seats to use as weapons against the police. The club also introduced an unusual kit for the new season, featuring a large "T" representing sponsors Talbot. Meanwhile, the club were selling key players including fan-favourite Tommy Hutchison, who departed for Manchester City, while failing to invest in replacements. The 1981–82 season started dismally, causing attendances to drop below 10,000. A late-season run of thirteen games with only one defeat and progress to the FA Cup quarter finals, inspired by former England captain Gerry Francis, left supporters feeling more optimistic by the end of the season. But this was short-lived, as further players were sold the following season including Garry Thompson, who was sold to West Bromwich for just £225,000. The squad was left with just fourteen players in early 1983 and, with morale low, the club slipped from fifth place into another yet relegation fight. They escaped by one point but the relationship between Hill and the supporters was beyond repair and he left the club in May 1983. Dave Sexton was also dismissed and the terrace on the Kop re-introduced, ending Hill's all-seat experiment.

== 1983–1987: Rebuilding the team and FA Cup win ==
At the end of the 1982–83 season almost half of the squad were out of contract and, given the gloomy atmosphere at the club, most did not want to sign new contracts. Mark Hateley, Danny Thomas and Gary Gillespie were among the high-profile names to leave. The new manager was Bobby Gould, who summed up the bleak situation at the club by saying "I have been thrown into the lions' den". A native of Coventry as well as a former player, Gould was very knowledgeable about the league's lower divisions, from which he began rebuilding the team by recruiting inexpensive players. The new recruits included members of the future cup-winning side, Dave Bennett, Michael Gynn and Trevor Peake, as well as Micky Adams, Sam Allardyce and Stuart Pearce, the last of whom joined from non-league Wealdstone a few months into the season. Brian "Harry" Roberts, one of the few players from the previous season to remain with the club, became captain. The inexperience of the side and the poor finances at the club, which were made worse by the withdrawal of Talbot's sponsorship deal, meant that once more the bookmakers had Coventry amongst the favourites for relegation. Despite supporter and pundit expectations, Coventry performed quite well in the first half of 1983–84, rising to fourth in the table by December through a run which included a 4–0 win over champions Liverpool. But once again their form deserted them after the new year, and after a run even worse than the previous season's were saved only through a last-day win against Norwich, Birmingham being relegated instead as they failed to beat Southampton.

Bobby Gould made several more signings in the summer and autumn of 1984, with the nucleus of the future cup-winning side beginning to take shape. Steve Ogrizovic, who would go on to break the club's appearance record, joined from Shrewsbury, Brian Kilcline moved from Notts County, and England-international Cyrille Regis switched from West Bromwich Albion. But the season started poorly, developing into another relegation fight, and Gould was sacked after two lacklustre defeats at Christmas, being replaced by his assistant Don Mackay. Their form improved, but they remained in deep relegation trouble. After a number of game cancellations in April due to a bout of flu, Coventry had three games to play after most other teams had completed their fixtures. Relegation rivals Norwich were eight points ahead, which left City requiring wins in all three games. In the first, they narrowly beat already-relegated Stoke, surviving when a late penalty hit the bar, and in the second they beat Luton with a winner six minutes before the end. The final game was at Highfield Road against Everton, who were already guaranteed the league championship. Coventry put on one of their best performances of the season, winning 4–1 to complete an unlikely escape and send Norwich down. In 1985–86 they faced their third successive relegation battle which went down to the final game. Home form was particularly poor, as City did not win any games at Highfield Road between 6 October and 22 February. Don Mackay resigned or was sacked in April, after a run of eight games without a win, replaced by George Curtis and the youth-team coach John Sillett for the final three games. Coventry won two of them and escaped relegation again.

In 1986–87 Coventry won the only major trophy in their history as they beat Tottenham Hotspur at Wembley to win the FA Cup. The season began with low expectations, following the previous season's relegation battle, and they lost the opening game 1–0 at West Ham. But this was followed up with a win over Arsenal and they didn't lose another game until 4 October. They remained in the top half of the table for the remainder of the year, with Cyrille Regis and Dave Bennett showing improved from in attack and the defence conceding few goals. They scored a notable victory against top-of-the-table Nottingham Forest in November. and on 27 December they played a thrilling game against Tottenham which finished 4–3, Regis scoring the winner in the final minute. The FA Cup run began with a third-round tie against Third Division side Bolton Wanderers, managed at the time by future Coventry manager Phil Neal. City won 3–0 in frozen conditions, Greg Downs, Regis and Bennett the scorers. Coventry's fourth round match was against Manchester United at Old Trafford. Returning from the team's brief trip to Spain to escape the cold George Curtis told the press "Our name is on the cup", but United were the firm favourites. The game was once again played on a frozen pitch and Coventry won the game 1–0 through a Keith Houchen goal. Recently appointed United manager Alex Ferguson cited City's better play for his team's defeat, saying "their players were prepared to risk life and limb – ours weren't".

Another away match followed in the fifth round on 21 February, this time Second Division at Stoke City, who had suffered only one defeat since November. The home side played better in the first half but Coventry withstood the pressure and once again took the game 1–0, Michael Gynn scoring on the rebound after David Phillips had failed to convert a Nick Pickering cross in the 72nd minute. The quarter-final was at Hillsborough against Sheffield Wednesday and scores were level after a first-half Regis goal was cancelled out by a 67th-minute equaliser by Gary Megson. But Coventry scored twice in the final stages to progress to their first ever semi-final, against Leeds United. The semi-final was also played at Hillsborough, this time as a neutral venue, and 27,000 Coventry supporters travelled to Sheffield for the game. Leeds were in the Second Division at the time and City started as favourites, but the Yorkshire side started better, forcing goalkeeper Steve Ogrizovic to make two early saves and taking the lead after fourteen minutes. Coventry played better after going behind, with Regis going close to scoring on three occasions, and eventually equalised after 69 minutes through a Gynn goal. Houchen's goal ten minutes later gave them a 2–1 lead but Leeds equalised with seven minutes remaining. Dave Bennett scored nine minutes into extra time and City held on for the win. The club's league form suffered somewhat during the cup run – despite challenging for a top-six finish at the turn of the year, they eventually finished tenth.

In the FA Cup final, they beat Tottenham Hotspur 3–2 in the final after extra time, the score having been 2–2 after 90 minutes. It is generally considered as one of finest finals of all time in terms of footballing technique, fair play and sheer excitement. This also finally made archaic the famous Monty Python 'World Forum' sketch, in which Coventry City's last FA Cup win is a trick question asked in a game show, as they hadn't won the Cup to that point. Coventry City's youth team also won the FA Youth Cup in 1987 (beating Charlton Athletic 2–1) to secure a remarkable 'double'. Aside from Coventry, only Arsenal, Liverpool and Everton have ever won both the FA Cup and FA Youth Cup in the same season. Key players in Coventry City's FA Cup winning team included goalkeeper Steve Ogrizovic, defender and captain Brian Kilcline, midfielders Dave Bennett and Lloyd McGrath, and strikers Cyrille Regis and Keith Houchen, who scored the famous diving header. Their manager at the time was John Sillett.

== 1987–1995: Post-cup-win years and launch of the Premier League ==
The city of Coventry enjoyed the glory of the Cup win during the summer of 1987, with supporters fixing sky-blue ribbons to their cars and extensive merchandise sales. Spending some of the profits made from their success, John Sillett bought David Speedie for £780,000, a club-record at the time, announcing that the club would "no longer be shopping at Woolworth's, from now on we're shopping at Harrods". The club were unable to participate in the European Cup Winners' Cup as English clubs were still banned from European competition following the 1985 Heysel Stadium disaster. The 1987–88 season began with another trip to Wembley, as Coventry played league-champions Everton in the FA Charity Shield. 40,000 Coventry supporters attended the game, which City lost 1–0. The first league game was a repeat of the FA Cup final, as Coventry played Tottenham, Speedie scoring in a 2–1 win. The season was a disappointment, however, with their defence of the FA Cup ending in a fourth-round home defeat to Watford and another tenth-place league finish. The following season City suffered one of the biggest upsets in FA Cup history, as they lost 2–1 to non-league Sutton United in the third round. They fared better in the league and were third in the table following a win over league-leaders Arsenal in late February. They eventually finished seventh, which was their highest finish since 1978, but the side was ageing by this time and many supporters felt that the club were not achieving their potential.

Coventry replaced a number of players during the 1989 close-season, buying defender Peter Billing and acquiring Liverpool's Kevin MacDonald on a free transfer, with David Phillips and Steve Sedgley leaving the club. John Sillett felt that there was a bubble in the transfer market at the time and declined to spend large amounts of money on players despite having funds available. Despite a strong start, which saw the side top of the table after four games, City struggled to score goals and finished twelfth in the table. They suffered another embarrassing FA Cup defeat, this time to Third Division Northampton, but fared better in the League Cup, reaching the semi-final with a 5–0 win over Sunderland before losing to eventual winners Nottingham Forest in the semi-final. Despite the poor finish to the previous season, Sillett believed the club could challenge for the league title in 1990–91, despite not making any major signings. The season started badly, however, and Sillett left the club in November - it was unclear if he was sacked or merely brought forward an already planned end-of-season departure. He was replaced by Terry Butcher, who arrived from Rangers as player-manager, for a £400,000 fee. Without prior experience in management Butcher struggled, and the club finished a disappointing 16th with a 5–4 fourth round League Cup defeat of holders Nottingham Forest the only significant success.

In the early 1990s, clubs in the First Division made the decision to set up the breakaway Premier League, with the goal of increasing revenue from television broadcasts and removing the ability of lower-league clubs to contribute to decisions affecting the top flight. The 1991–92 season was thus the last in the old First Division before the launch of the Premier League, and it was another disappointing one for Coventry. Their first few games included home defeats to Manchester City and Wimbledon but also a surprise away win at Arsenal, with newly signed Zimbabwean Peter Ndlovu scoring his first goal for the club. They were in fourth place after nine games, but a slump followed and by Christmas, City were descending towards the bottom of the table. Butcher, whose retirement as a player had led to a contract dispute, was dismissed in January after an FA Cup defeat to Cambridge. Don Howe took over but the club continued to play poorly and were pulled into a relegation fight. On the final day of the season City lost 2–0 at Aston Villa, ex-City-hero Cyrille Regis scoring the opener, but they were saved from relegation as rivals Luton were also defeated.

The Premier League was launched in summer 1992 as the First Division clubs, including Coventry City following their last-day relegation escape, resigned en masse from the Football League. The club decided in summer 1992 to bring back Bobby Gould, who had enjoyed some success at Wimbledon and West Bromwich since his dismissal by Coventry, for a second stint as manager. The intention was for him to work jointly with Don Howe but the latter decided to step down due to a combination of ill health, a difficult commute and a lack of popularity with supporters. City therefore appointed Phil Neal as Gould's assistant. Coventry made a bright start to the season, occupying second place in the table after six of the first eight games were won. This was followed by a run of disappointing draws, which was halted with the arrival of Micky Quinn from Newcastle. Scoring ten goals in six games, Quinn inspired City to a 5–1 win over Liverpool in December, followed by a 3–0 result against Aston Villa. The fans warmed to Quinn instantly, using the chant "He's fat, he's round, he scores at every ground" in reference to his alleged overweight status. The season finished disappointingly with just one win from the last eleven games, slumping from a possible European place to finish 15th but the club were never in relegation danger.

Bryan Richardson took over as chairman of the club in summer 1993 and the club made another strong start to 1993–94, opening with a Quinn hat-trick in a 3–0 win at Arsenal and being unbeaten after eight games. Trouble followed however, as a 5–1 defeat at Queen's Park Rangers was followed by Gould's resignation, the manager claiming that Richardson was forcing him into selling star striker Peter Ndlovu. Phil Neal took over and was initially allowed to strengthen the team rather than sell. The club played some positive football and possessed two top-class players in Ndlovu and Phil Babb, but remained unable to play consistently through a whole season and finished 11th. A strong end to the season meant that 1994–95 began with optimism, enhanced by Neal's purchase of Dion Dublin and American winger Cobi Jones. December injuries to Dublin and David Busst led to a poor run of results, culminating in FA Cup defeat to Norwich and supporters quickly turned against Phil Neal. Neal's reputation had also fallen with the release of "The Impossible Job", a documentary about former England manager Graham Taylor and Neal, his assistant, which portrayed the latter as a "yes man" with no independent opinions. He was sacked and replaced by Ron Atkinson, with Gordon Strachan named assistant manager.

== 1995–2001: Final years in the top flight ==
The arrival of Atkinson and Strachan, and Richardson's promise of considerable sums of money to spend on players, brought a sense of optimism to Highfield Road in the summer of 1995. Atkinson made several big-name signings in summer 1995 and during the season, including Brazilian Isaías, John Salako, Nii Lamptey and Noel Whelan, who arrived for a then-club-record £2 million. They also rejected offers of several million pounds each for Dublin and Ndlovu. After making a reasonable start, the team suffered their worst run in the top flight, playing fourteen league games without a win and by early December, City were bottom of the table. They revived somewhat after Whelan's signing in December, but more poor results followed and by Easter, City appeared certain to be relegated. They avoided the drop by winning three of their final six games and benefiting on the final day as Manchester City played out a 2–2 draw without attempting to win, under the false belief that this would keep them up. Coventry continued to spend money on players during the summer of 1996, breaking their transfer record again with the purchase of Gary McAllister from Leeds for £3 million. They suffered a poor start to the campaign though, and with Atkinson failing to bring success he was moved to the Director of Football role, handing over to his designated-successor, Strachan. They had a brief revival but as the season drew to a close they were fighting another relegation battle. For the third season in a row Strachan appeared for the team himself, despite being officially retired and inspired the team to a crucial win over Chelsea. They played Tottenham at White Hart Lane in the final game knowing that only a win and favourable results elsewhere would save them. In a match delayed by 15 minutes due to traffic, they held on for a 2–1 win and were safe again, their tenth and final last-day escape of the top-flight era.

The 1997–98 season, Strachan's first full campaign in charge, was much more successful. A solid 11th-place finish in the league was accompanied by the club's best FA Cup run since 1987, ending only with a quarter-final replay defeat on penalties at Sheffield United. Notable wins during the season included a 3–2 win against champions Manchester United, featuring a Darren Huckerby goal that won goal of the month, an FA Cup win at Liverpool and the club's first ever win away to Aston Villa in the FA Cup fifth round. Dion Dublin's 18 league goals earned him a share of the Premier League Golden Boot for the season and he played for England during the season but failed to make the squad for the 1998 FIFA World Cup. Off the pitch, Bryan Richardson revealed ambitious plans for the club's future including "Arena 2000", the initial proposals for the Ricoh Arena. The plans at that time envisaged a 40,000-seat stadium, to be opened in 2001, which was also designated as one of the host venues in the unsuccessful England 2006 FIFA World Cup bid. The next season proved a disappointment after the optimism of the previous campaign. City achieved an opening-day victory over a Chelsea team of international stars, but this was followed by four defeats in the next five games. A run of six games with only one defeat in the spring took the club clear of the relegation fight, but a poor run-in saw them finish in 15th. Another cup run seemed on the cards after a 7–0 win over Macclesfield and a 3–0 defeat at local rivals Leicester in the third and fourth rounds, but it was ended by a poor performance in a 2–1 fifth round defeat at Everton. Adding to supporters' frustration, several top players left during the season and the subsequent summer. This included Dublin, who was sold to Aston Villa for £5.75 million in an acrimonious deal, as well as Huckerby and George Boateng.

The 1999–2000 campaign was one of contrasts. Boosted by the arrival of Robbie Keane for £6 million, as well as Moroccans Moustapha Hadji and Youssef Chippo, Coventry achieved 12 wins from their 19 home games. This included a 3–2 Boxing Day defeat of Arsenal, described by the Coventry Telegraph as one of the "most memorable wins of the Premier League era". But away from home, City failed to win a single game all season, losing the last five, which meant ultimately they could only finish 14th. McAllister, labelled by club historian Jim Brown as "the fulcrum of all the team's moves" during the season, left the club in the summer. Keane also departed to Inter Milan for £13 million and, with neither player adequately replaced, the team struggled throughout the 2000–01 season. They won two of their first three games, ending the run of winless away games in the process, but they then won only two further games before Christmas. Strachan tried numerous different team structures, but the poor run continued. Veteran striker John Hartson arrived on loan in February, and his leadership and goals caused some improvement in results. But it was not enough, and City's 34-year tenure in the top flight ended on 5 May 2001 with a 3–2 defeat to arch-rivals Aston Villa.

== 2001–2006: Life outside the Premiership ==
Five games into the 2001–02 season manager Gordon Strachan was sacked, shortly after an embarrassing 1–0 defeat at home to Grimsby Town. He was replaced by 38-year-old team regular Roland Nilsson, who took on the role of player-manager. Nilsson was dismissed at the end of the season after failing to get Coventry into the play-offs. This was particularly disappointing for Coventry fans, as the club had been one of the favourites to win the title at the start of the season. He was replaced by 37-year-old Gary McAllister, also a player-manager, who had been on the club's books from 1996 to 2000 before being transferred to Liverpool.

Midway through the 2002–03 season, McAllister's men still stood a good chance of making the Division One play-offs. But they won only one league game after the turn of 2003 and finished 20th in the final table – just two places above the relegation zone. Their form in 2003–04 was slightly better but McAllister left halfway through the season to spend time with his seriously ill wife, Denise. Assistant manager Eric Black took charge and kept the club well clear of the drop zone and facilitated some excellent results. Before the final match of the season, he was replaced by former Sunderland manager Peter Reid. This decision proved a very unpopular one with the majority of the club's fans, as Black (who was popular and had been doing a good job with relatively limited resources) had been seen to have been ousted for a 'big name' whose management style was perceived as 'old school' and not fitting with the modern game. As a protest against the decision and gesture of support for Black, thousands of fans arranged to turn up to the final game of the season against Crystal Palace in black clothing. Reid caused further anger when he worked in Portugal for the BBC during the summer of 2004, when many felt he should have been scouting and trying to improve the stretched playing squad.

On 13 January 2005, the club touched off a controversy when it announced that the traditional badge would be replaced with an updated, more modern version. Fan reaction was swift and negative, and under pressure from supporters' groups the club cancelled plans to change the crest.

Peter Reid lasted just eight months before the club's dismal league form led to his departure and in January 2005 he left the club looking in real danger of relegation to League One. The club's board replaced Reid with former Leicester City manager Micky Adams. Adams helped the Sky Blues stay clear of the Championship drop zone in their final season at Highfield Road before relocating to a new 32,600-seat stadium at Foleshill (later named the Ricoh Arena as part of a sponsorship deal). As an ex-Coventry player from 1983 to 1987, Adams was a popular choice with fans as he had a genuine fondness for the club and preferred a more technical and Continental approach to playing than his predecessor. In the 2005–06 season, Coventry City finished a respectable 8th in the Championship (missing out on the Premiership play-offs by only two league places), which represented good progress from the previous season's narrow escape from relegation. Micky Adams was expected to challenge for a play-off position in the 2006–07 season but was relieved of his duties in January 2007 after a string of poor results and an embarrassing FA Cup exit at the hands of lower league Bristol City, bringing to an end his two-year reign.

== 2006–2011: Operation Premiership and the Ranson/SISU era ==
During the 2005/06 campaign, as fans grew increasingly discontent at the lack of progress in the club, the club's senior management were replaced. The incoming management team: Paul Fletcher, managing director; Ken Sharp, marketing director and Mal Brannigan, Finance Director; had contributed to the new sense of enthusiasm felt at the club. They launched 'Operation Premiership', a 3-year plan to get Coventry back in the top league. To help achieve that they brought in new investment and created initiatives such as 'True Sky Blue' (aka Private Seat Licence), which gives fans the chance to buy a seat for life. In turn, more money has been invested in the squad, allowing Adams to invest in 11 players before the start of the 2006–07 season.

The 2006/07 season started with the most optimism for years, with genuine belief the club could mount a serious challenge to get back to the Premiership based on the turn in fortunes of the club with the new stadium, innovative board, good manager and squad, as well as the previous season's improved form. This, however, lessened after only 4 points and 2 goals from the first 4 games and the sale of star player, Gary McSheffrey to local rivals Birmingham City for a maximum of £4million, with £2.3 million upfront and the rest based on Birmingham and international appearances. The season went further downhill when they were embarrassingly knocked out of the League Cup in the first round 3–1 by Football League Two side, Hereford United.

They were then drawn against Bristol City in the 3rd round of the FA Cup, 20 years after their majestic triumph in the competition. A large following of just under 3,000 Sky Blues travelled to the Ashton Gate stadium in the hope of some respite from their appalling league form. Many sections of the media pinpointed this as a 'must-win' fixture for Adams. His future looked bleak as Coventry were 3–1 down in the first half only to claw back one goal before half-time and then stage a stirring comeback to draw 3–3 with Stern John grabbing the equaliser. In the build-up to the replay however Coventry produced arguably their worst defensive performance for years and succumbed to a 4–2 home defeat against a distinctly average Crystal Palace side on 13 January. Coventry went on to lose the replay 2–0 in spite of a spirited 2nd-half comeback. With fans calling for the head of under-pressure manager Micky Adams, his position became untenable and he was dismissed the next day.

Assistant Manager Adrian Heath was named caretaker manager and threw his hat into the ring for the full-time position despite a demoralising 3–2 defeat away at Plymouth Argyle in his first game in charge. Heath made way for new manager Iain Dowie who signed a three-year contract and declared his ambition to guide Coventry back into the Premiership. He led Coventry to a 4–1 demolition of Barnsley and secured 17th place (lower mid-table) in the Championship after a 2–1 away win over Burnley in the season's final game. Whilst still distinctly 'work in progress', Dowie's team selections looked defensively better-organised than his predecessor's, with more attention paid to solid midfield possession, a more fluid counter-attacking strategy and some shrewd new signings. They began the 2007–2008 season with impressive away wins at Barnsley and Cardiff, and reached the third round of the League Cup without conceding a goal, meeting Manchester United in that round, causing a shock by defeating the reigning Premiership champions 2–0 at Old Trafford to advance to the 4th round. Both goals were scored by Maltese international striker Michael Mifsud (who also hit the woodwork to deny him a hat-trick) in front a 74,000-strong crowd, including some 11,000 Sky Blues supporters. They eventually succumbed in this competition after a 2–1 loss to the Premiership's West Ham United in a game the Sky Blues completely dominated (West Ham's goals came from a cruel deflection and a highly fortunate goal deep into injury time), thus missing out on a lucrative place in the quarter-finals.

The planned crest update

Following a highly successful start to the season, Dowie was named "Manager of the Month" for August 2007, having secured top position after the first four league games and two successive League Cup wins. However, by February 2008 the team had slumped to a lowly 19th position in the league table.

On 6 October 2007, Paul Fletcher tendered his resignation in the wake of numerous takeover bids being priced out of the market, leaving both Operation Premiership and the long-term financial future of the club up in the air. Then, on 10 October 2007, Geoffrey Robinson resigned as chairman of Coventry City Football club, stating that he wished to devote his time to pursuing his Parliamentary career. Joe Elliott promptly took over as chairman on the same day, with rumours rife that the club was close to being called-in by administrators whilst burdened with estimated debts of £38 million. In response to takeover talks, the club confirmed that two consortia, one led by former Chairman Geoffrey Robinson and the other led by former footballer Ray Ranson, had offered takeover bids for the club. Nonetheless, the club filed for administration with a 14 December 2007 deadline to avoid administration by closing a takeover deal.

On 14 December 2007, Ray Ranson and the SISU group successfully completed the takeover of the football club with half an hour to spare before going into administration. They required 90% of shares, which was acquired in January to take full control. As of 11 February 2008, Ian Dowie, Tim Flowers and Bob Dowie were sacked with immediate effect, with one win (4–0 against Barnsley) in their last 6 league matches – leaving them 19th in the Championship and 4 points from relegation. John Harbin and Frankie Bunn were placed in temporary charge of first team affairs in a joint caretaker role. After a 5–0 humiliation at the hands of West Brom, they were replaced on 19 February 2008, with former Fulham and Real Sociedad manager Chris Coleman. Coventry's Championship status was not secured until the final game of the season, where despite losing 4–1 away at Charlton Athletic Coventry finished in 21st place due to Leicester City failing to beat Stoke City.

== 2011–2017: Stadium row and two relegations ==
In 2011–12, after five consecutive seasons in the bottom eight of the table, Coventry finally succumbed to relegation from the Championship, falling to the third tier for the first time since 1964. Faced with large losses, SISU had responded by selling many of the club's top stars such as Danny Fox and Scott Dann, while failing to agree new terms with out-of-contract players including Marlon King and goalkeeper Keiren Westwood. Failure to replace them, as well as the team's tendency to concede last-minute goals and suffer vital losses to other teams facing relegation, ultimately led to their finish in the bottom three. A consortium led by supporter Gary Hoffman attempted to buy the club but despite the club's losses and their unpopularity with supporters SISU refused to sell, perhaps because they hoped to acquire ownership of the stadium in future. In April 2012, SISU defaulted on the rent owed to ACL, setting in motion a multi-year battle between the club and the stadium's owners. The club claimed that the annual rent of £1.2million was too high for them, and would not be sustainable given their imminent drop to League One.

The 2012–13 season was a turbulent one for Coventry. After drawing their first three games in League One, having held the lead in each, the club sacked Thorn in late August, appointing Shaw and Carsley as interim managers. A run of five defeats followed, leaving the club second from bottom in late September. Mark Robins was appointed as the new permanent manager and results began to improve; between mid-November and the end of the year, City won six of their eight league games, drawing the other two. This earned Robins the manager of the month award for December and a play-off place seemed possible. But fans were left disappointed in February when Robins departed the club, just five months into his three-year contract, to join Championship Huddersfield Town. Former player Steven Pressley was named as his replacement, the third manager of the season. Off the field, the rent row between Coventry City and ACL intensified and the club's holding company went into administration in March. This resulted in ten points being deducted by the Football League, effectively ending their play-off hopes. They eventually finished in 15th position.

With the stadium row remaining unresolved, the club announced that it would play its home games for 2013–14 at Sixfields Stadium in Northampton, 34 miles from Coventry, whilst planning for a new stadium in the Coventry area. Many supporters began a boycott of home games following this decision, with some travelling to Northampton during the games to protest against the club's owners at a site which they dubbed "Jimmy's Hill". The club began the season still in administration, after failing to come to an agreement with ACL over a company voluntary arrangement. This triggered another 10-point deduction, but the Football League allowed the club to continue playing by agreeing to transfer its golden share to the administrator's preferred bidder, Otium Entertainment Group, a company majority owned by SISU. In August 2013, SISU applied for a judicial review into Coventry City Council's loan of £14 million to ACL; this concluded in June 2014 with a decision that the deal did not amount to amounted to unlawful state aid. SISU vowed to appeal. On the field, the club had a reasonable season – in late March the club were mid-table, and but for the ten-point penalty they would have been challenging for a play-off place at that time. Their form dipped late in the season and eventually avoided relegation only in the penultimate game. Callum Wilson was voted the player of the season by his fellow players, in recognition of his 22 goals in 41 games during the season. It proved to be his last for the club as he departed for AFC Bournemouth in July 2014.

City began 2014–15 playing home games at Sixfields Stadium once more, but in mid-August they announced that they had reached an agreement with ACL to return to the Ricoh Arena for the next two seasons, with the option to then continue playing there for another two. More than 27,000 supporters attended their first game back, a 1–0 victory over Gillingham. They won again against Yeovil the following week, elevating them to fifth position in the table, but then dropped down almost to the relegation zone, after losing six and drawing one of their next seven games. While acknowledging the importance of playing in Coventry, Pressley bemoaned the state of the Ricoh pitch, saying that "from a football perspective it was a disaster". Attendances at the stadium began to fall, eventually reaching the lowest level for home games in Coventry in more than 50 years. Pressley was sacked in February 2015, following a draw at Sheffield United which put the club into the relegation zone, and was replaced by Tony Mowbray. In the final game against Crawley, both sides were in relegation danger although City only needed a draw to survive. After falling behind in the second half, they eventually won the game to assure their League One status. The other significant development during the season was the purchase of the Ricoh Arena by Wasps RFC, a Premiership rugby union club previously based in High Wycombe. Wasps bought the holdings of both the city council and the Higgs charity, for £2.77 million each. The latter purchase proved controversial as Higgs turned down a rival £2.8 million offer from Coventry City, despite the club holding the right of first refusal to purchase the Higgs stake.

2015–16 was a season of contrasts. City had an excellent first four months of the campaign, and were top of the division in late November following a 4–1 over previous leaders Gillingham. Their form dipped after Christmas, however, and a run of seven defeats in nine games from mid-January to mid-March meant that ultimately they missed the play-offs by five points. Significant transfers included the departure of star midfielder James Maddison to Norwich, and the arrival of former England international Joe Cole from Aston Villa, initially on loan and later on a full-time deal, although he departed for American club Tampa Bay Rowdies at the end of the season. Coventry started the 2016–17 season badly, failing to win any league games in August or September, and causing Mowbray to resign as manager. Mark Venus took over as caretaker, and the team enjoyed a successful spell, winning four of Venus's first six games. Their form deserted them, however, and they failed to win a single league game between 1 November 2016 and 18 February 2017, losing twelve and drawing two during that period. Russell Slade was appointed as permanent manager during this time, but he was not able to reverse the slump and his failure to win in his first nine league games equals a record set by Cantwell in 1967–68. In early March, with City bottom of the table and 13 points below safety, Slade was sacked and replaced by Robins, returning for a second spell. Their form improved slightly in the final eight games, with four wins and one draw, but it was not enough and Coventry were relegated to the fourth tier for the first time since 1959. There was some consolation for the supporters in April as Coventry won the 2017 EFL Trophy Final at Wembley with a 2–1 win over Oxford, earning their first major trophy since the 1987 FA Cup.

Throughout this period, SISU were involved in legal battles regarding the council's involvement in the Ricoh Arena. They applied for permission to appeal against the 2014 judicial-review decision, a process which eventually concluded at the supreme court in late 2016 with a ruling prohibiting allowing a full appeal. They then applied for a fresh judicial review, this time into the council's role in the sale of the stadium to Wasps by ACL. SISU alleged that the deal undervalued the stadium by £30 million. This application was refused by the High Court in July 2017, Once again, SISU sought permission to appeal this decision at the Court of Appeal. This appeal was allowed and was held in June 2018, but the court eventually ruled against them later that year, affirming the decision to deny the second judicial review. They asked the supreme court to intervene, but this was refused in April 2019.

== 2018–2020: Exiled again and ascent back to the Championship ==
Coventry won their first two games back in the league's bottom division, going briefly to the top of the table in mid-August 2017. Their form was somewhat erratic through the autumn, but they remained in the top half of the table and a run of four wins in six games around Christmas put them into third place. Another run of poor form followed, leaving them outside the play-off zone by mid-February, but with 3 defeats in their final 14 games they were able to secure a sixth place and a play-off berth. After defeating Notts County 5–2 on aggregate over two legs, City faced Exeter City in the play-off final at Wembley. Coventry took a 3–0 lead with second-half goals from Jordan Willis, Jordan Shipley and Jack Grimmer, eventually winning the game 3–1. This resulted in their first promotion for 51 years since being guided into the First Division by Hill in 1967. They had a solid season back in League One for 2018–19 finishing in eighth position. A run of five consecutive victories in October saw them briefly in the play-off positions, but this was followed by seven games without a win, five of which were lost, and ultimately they missed the top six by eight points.

Having exhausted all domestic avenues for seeking a judicial review into the sale of the Ricoh Arena to Wasps, SISU in May 2019 decided to launch a complaint about the issue to the European Commission (EC). This filing alleged that the deal broke the European Union state aid laws, on the grounds that Coventry City Council had undervalued the stadium when they sold their share. At the same time, the club's 2015 agreement with Wasps to play home games at the stadium was coming to an end, and it was seeking to make a fresh deal with the rugby club. Wasps had previously said that they would not agree to a deal while legal action involving them and SISU was outstanding. SISU signed an agreement to this effect in April 2019 and the EC complaint was not regarded by legal experts as technically legal action, but this nonetheless derailed the negotiations. In early June, with talks unresolved and faced with the threat of expulsion from the league over its lack of a confirmed home for 2018–19, the club announced that it would once again leave Coventry to commence a ground share with Birmingham City at their St Andrew's stadium. The EFL permitted City to make this move, but insisted they "ensure progress is made in regard to finding a solution to getting the club back playing in Coventry at the earliest opportunity".

Coventry started the 2019–20 season brightly, with wins in their first five fixtures at St Andrew's and draws in the four away matches sending them top of League One in mid-September. They then suffered a dip in form, earning only two wins from their next eleven league games, culminating in their third defeat of the season at Shrewsbury, which dropped them out of the play-off zone. That defeat proved their last of the season, as they won eleven of their next fourteen games, drawing the others. City moved back into second place in mid-March with a win at Southend. A draw with leaders Rotherham followed two games later, and when Coventry beat Sunderland on 1 March 2020, they ascended to the top. In mid-February, the 2019–20 League One season was suspended due to the impact of the COVID-19 pandemic. On 9 June, League One and League Two clubs voted to cancel the remainder of the season, with only the play-offs to be completed. Final league positions for the season were determined using a points-per-game system. With 67 points from 34 games, a points-per-game ratio of 1.97, Coventry were promoted to the Championship as League One champions, ahead of Rotherham's 1.77 points per game.

== 2020–22: Consolidating back in The Championship ==
The club failed to reach an agreement to return to the Ricoh Arena upon promotion back to The Championship, the club extended their stay at St Andrew's for the 2020–21 season which was played entirely behind closed doors due COVID-19 restrictions.

On the pitch, the club's first game in the second tier for over 8 years was a 2–1 defeat to Bristol City at Ashton Gate. Robins' side battled against relegation for the bulk of the season however pulled away from the bottom three in the closing weeks of the season eventually sealing a 16th-placed finish, their highest since the 2005–06 season.

The club eventually negotiated a return to The Ricoh (Now known as The Coventry Building Society Arena) in the summer of 2021 in time for the fans return to stadiums following the easing of COVID restrictions in the United Kingdom.

The club made a very positive start to the 2021–22 season and gave themselves a great chance of achieving a Play-Off spot, with the goals of Swedish international striker Viktor Gyökeres proving pivotal in their push. However the team's form eventually faded out and the club ended up finishing outside the play off spots in a still respectable 12th place.

The 2022–23 season started off in farcical fashion off the pitch once again for the club. Failed investment in the playing surface at the CBS Arena followed by the use of the stadium for Rugby 7's at the 2022 Commonwealth Games meant that the pitch was deemed unplayable by the start of the domestic football season. The clubs first three League home games against Rotherham United, Wigan Athletic and Huddersfield Town were postponed whilst a League Cup tie with Bristol City had to be moved to the Pirelli Stadium in Burton-On-Trent in order for the club to be spared expulsion from the competition.

The financial collapse of the club's landlords and owners of the CBS Arena, Wasps Rugby Club once again left Coventry City's future at the stadium in doubt, the operating company of the CBS Arena, Wasps owned Arena Coventry Limited also fell into administration. With genuine fears the club would be locked out the stadium they confirmed they were seeking an alternative venue for their home match with Blackburn Rovers however the game was eventually played at the Arena as planned.

Following the Arena's takeover by billionaire Mike Ashley's Frasers Group, the club were served with an eviction notice from the CBS Arena with Frasers claiming the clubs rental agreement with Wasps was no longer legally binding following the stadiums change in ownership. Coventry City and Frasers were able to agree a deal to keep the club at the Arena until at least the end of the 2022–23 season.

After the club endured a stop/start beginning to the 2022–23 season thanks to the aforementioned postponements due to the pitch issues at the CBS Arena they found themselves rock bottom of the League in October 2022, albeit having played far less games than everybody else. They finally started to find some form and lifted up the table to leave themselves just outside the play-off spots as the season took an unprecedented pause in November in order to accommodate the 2022 FIFA World Cup in Qatar.

== 2022–2024: End of the SISU era and the ownership of Doug King ==
The club announced on 16 November 2022 that Stratford Upon-Avon based businessman Doug King was to acquire an 85% stake in the club, ending 15 years of SISU Control.

King attempted to unify the football club and the Arena under the same ownership by launching a last minute attempt to purchase the Arena, which was available following Wasps' demise. However exclusivity had already been granted to Mike Ashley and Frasers who completed their purchase of the CBS Arena.

King's takeover was ratified by the EFL on 10 January 2023. Chairman Tim Fisher resigned immediately and King installed himself as replacement. The first game under King's ownership was a 1–0 defeat to Burnley on 14 January 2023.

On 27 January 2023, just two weeks after his majority takeover was ratified by the EFL, Doug King increased his ownership stake in Coventry City buying out the remaining 15% of SISU's shares making him the clubs sole owner.

On the pitch the club ended the 2022/23 season strongly and qualified for the end of season play-offs, after overcoming Middlesbrough over two legs they reached the play-off final where they would face Luton Town in what would be their third trip to the national stadium in just over six years. A win would have sealed a return to the top flight for the first time in 22 years. However they lost out in an agonising penalty shoot out defeat following a 1–1 draw in normal and extra time.

In the summer of 2023 and following their failure to seal promotion to the Premier League star players Gustavo Hamer and Viktor Gyökeres departed The Sky Blues, the latter for a club record outgoing fee.

Robins used the funds generated from the Hamer and Gyökeres sales to revamp his side including breaking the club's inbound transfer record on American international striker Haji Wright. Again after a difficult start to the 2023/24 season the clubs form improved dramatically around Christmas and they found themselves firmly in the hunt for a play-off spot again.

The club narrowly missed out on a second consecutive finish in the play-offs in 2024, however they did manage a return to Wembley once again by virtue of making the semi-final of the FA Cup where they were drawn to face Manchester United. They lost out in a penalty shoot out after scoring three late goals from 3–0 down to take the tie past normal time. Coventry were the unfortunate victims of one of the most controversial offside decisions in FA Cup history when Victor Torp’s last minute ‘winner’ was ruled out by a very small length.

== 2024–present: Life after Mark Robins and ownership of The Arena ==
Following a second successive heartbreak at Wembley and the club narrowly missing out on the play offs in 2023–24 the club was widely expected to challenge at the top of The Championship ahead of the 2024–25 season.

The summer of 2024 saw another large outlay of money on new players and the club break record season ticket and merchandise sales. However it was announced that Robins' long term assistant Adi Viveash would be leaving the club following a restructure to the coaching structure at the club which saw former player George Boateng and Rhys Carr come in as Robins' new assistants.

The new season got off to a sluggish start where despite some positive results a failure to find any real consistency in form saw the club in the lower portion of the table well into the autumn. On 7 November 2024 following a 2–1 home defeat to Derby County the previous day Mark Robins was sacked in what was described as a 'difficult decision' going on to say that "There is no doubt that Coventry City today would not be where it is today without the inspired actions of Mark and his team".

A run of two draws and a defeat under interim head coach Rhys Carr preceded the appointment of Frank Lampard in the newly named role of head coach. Lampard recruited Joe Edwards and Chris Jones to assist him as he had done in his previous role at Everton and also in his caretaker stint at Chelsea.

The appointment of Lampard rapidly turned around the side's fortunes, City were 17th on the day of Lampard's appointment and he managed propel them up the division and into the play-off places, confirming their spot in the Top 6 with a 2–0 win over Middlesbrough on 3 May 2025.

The club faced Sunderland in the 2024–25 play-off semi final. After losing the first leg 2–1 at The CBS Arena, City travelled to Wearside hoping to become only the second ever side in the history of the second tier play-offs to overturn a losing deficit from a club's home leg (Ironically the first was Lampard's Derby County side against Leeds in 2018–19). After a 1–0 victory in normal time at Stadium of Light the tie looked to be heading to a penalty shoot-out before Sunderland's Daniel Ballard scored in the 122nd minute to break City hearts and send Sunderland (Who would eventually be promoted) to Wembley.

On 23 August 2025, over 20 years since the stadium's opening, it was announced that Coventry City Football Club had purchased the CBS Arena after Doug King had reached an agreement with Frasers Group to acquire the stadium. That same day, Coventry beat Queens Park Rangers, who were also the first visitors to the CBS Arena in 2005, continuing a positive start to the 2025–26 season.

== Summary of home grounds ==
- Dowells Field: 1883–1887
- Stoke Road: 1887–1899
- Highfield Road: 1899–2005
- Coventry Building Society Arena: 2005–2013, 2014–2019, 2021– (known as the Ricoh Arena 2005–2021)
- Sixfields Stadium: 2013–2014 (ground-share with Northampton Town for 27 competitive matches)
- St Andrew's: 2019–2021 (ground-share with Birmingham City for 46 competitive matches)
- Pirelli Stadium: 2022 (ground-share with Burton Albion for 1 competitive match)
