= Joe Allon =

English footballer

Personal information
- Full name: Joseph Ball Allon
- Date of birth: 12 November 1966 (age 59)
- Place of birth: Gateshead, England
- Height: 5 ft 11 in (1.80 m)
- Position: Forward

Youth career
- 1982–1984: Newcastle United

Senior career*
Years	Team	Apps	(Gls)
1984–1987	Newcastle United	9	(2)
1987–1988	Swansea City	34	(12)
1988–1991	Hartlepool United	112	(48)
1991–1992	Chelsea	14	(2)
1992	→ Port Vale (loan)	6	(0)
1992–1994	Brentford	45	(19)
1993	→ Southend United (loan)	3	(0)
1994–1995	Port Vale	23	(9)
1995	Lincoln City	4	(0)
1995–1998	Hartlepool United	56	(19)
Total		306	(111)

International career
1985	England Youth	1	(0)
- * Club domestic league appearances and goals

Joseph Ball Allon (born 12 November 1966) is an English former footballer. A striker, he scored 135 goals in 361 league and cup games in a 14-year career in the English Football League.

Starting his career with Newcastle United in 1984, he failed to break into the first team and moved to Swansea City in 1987. He signed for Hartlepool United a year later, scoring 48 league goals for the club. He transferred to Chelsea in 1991. After a season with Chelsea, including a loan spell with Port Vale, he joined Brentford. In 1994, he moved back to Port Vale permanently before moving back to Hartlepool United via Lincoln City in 1995. He retired in 1998 due to a knee injury. He won three promotions with three clubs, and was voted onto the Fourth Division PFA Team of the Year in 1990–91 and won the North-East Footballer of the Year award in 1990–91.

== Career ==
=== Newcastle United ===
Allon joined Newcastle United in 1982 and made his debut in the first team when Jack Charlton was manager in a 2–1 win over Stoke City at St James' Park on 1 December 1984. At the end of 1984–85 he starred in the FA Youth Cup final victory over Watford, scoring twice in a game in which Paul Gascoigne also netted a wonder goal. He was also capped at England Youth level. Allon scored twice in nine First Division games in 1985–86 and 1986–87, before manager Willie McFaul moved him on to Swansea City in August 1987.

=== Swansea City ===
Terry Yorath's Swans won promotion out of the Fourth Division in 1987–88 after beating Torquay United 5–4 on aggregate in the play-off final. During the season, Allon also scored against rivals Cardiff City in the South Wales derby, in a 2–2 draw at Vetch Field on New Year's Day. He scored 12 times in 40 league and cup appearances in a partnership with Colin Pascoe before he returned to the North-East to join Hartlepool United in November 1988 as one of Bobby Moncur's first signings as manager. Moncur drove from Hartlepool to South Wales to watch the striker in a reserve team game and decided to sign him.

=== Hartlepool United ===
Hartlepool paid a nominal fee for the striker to bring him back to the North East. The club struggled near the foot of the Football League in 1988–89 under Moncur, and Allon scored just five goals in 26 starts. The team again struggled in 1989–90 and suffered some heavy defeats under Moncur – losing 7–1 at York City, 6–1 at Aldershot and 6–0 at home to Doncaster. As Hartlepool improved in the second half of the season and moved off bottom spot after being rooted there with 9 points from 18 games, Allon scored 17 goals in 45 league starts to become the club's joint top-scorer with strike partner Paul Baker. New manager Cyril Knowles was the catalyst for change as he turned the club's fortunes around. Allon had a reunion with his former Newcastle United teammate Paul Gascoigne in September 1990 as Hartlepool played Tottenham Hotspur in the League Cup. Gascoigne scored four goals in a 5–0 White Hart Lane defeat for Hartlepool, who lost the second-leg 2–1 at the Victoria Ground.

Allon scored the winning goal for at Feethams in November 1990, as Hartlepool defeated rivals Darlington 1–0. By scoring the winning goal at Feethams in 1997, the striker became the only Hartlepool striker to have twice scored a winning goal in front of the Tin Shed, the favoured end for supporters of Darlington.

Hartlepool won promotion in 1990–91 for only the second time in their history. The club finished third but were only one point behind champions Darlington. Allon scored 35 goals in 55 games in the campaign and was named Hennessey Cognac North East Player of the Year and North East Football Writers Player of the Year, and was also voted onto the PFA Team of the Year. He came close of a move to Middlesbrough, but called off the deal after manager Colin Todd was dismissed.

=== Chelsea ===
His form in the 1990–91 season earned him a move to top-flight side Chelsea in August 1991, with manager Ian Porterfield paying a fee reported to be £375,000. Middlesbrough were also interested in his services that summer. Allon scored at home on his Chelsea debut, but he failed to make an impact at Stamford Bridge after sustaining a leg injury which became infected. In February of the 1991–92 season he joined Port Vale on loan, but made just six goalless appearances for John Rudge's Valiants, who struggled in vain to avoid relegation out of the Second Division. He only stayed for a few months of 1992–93, the inaugural season of the Premier League. It was rumoured that his friendship with Vinnie Jones led him astray and helped to bring about his poor form. Allon started just four games (with a further 14 substitute appearances) and scored three goals for Chelsea. He was sold to Brentford in November 1992 for a club-record incoming fee of £275,000.

=== Brentford ===
Brentford were relegated from the First Division at the end of the 1992–93 season under manager Phil Holder. Allon scored 28 goals in 56 league and cup appearances at Griffin Park. However, the new manager David Webb wanted Allon off the wage bill. He had a brief spell on loan at Southend United in September 1993, where he punched manager Barry Fry upon scoring his 100th career league goal.

=== Port Vale ===
Allon moved back to Port Vale – this time permanently – in March 1994. He signed a two-year contract with Vale, which turned out to be only a one-year deal due to an error by the club. Chairman Bill Bell arranged a deal to sign Allon on a free transfer, but Brentford would be paid £2,000 for every appearance and £1,000 for every goal he scored. He scored twice in what remained of the 1993–94 campaign, helping the club to win promotion out of the Second Division. He scored eight goals in 22 games at Vale Park in 1994–95, before he was sold to Third Division side Lincoln City for £42,500 in July 1995.

=== Lincoln City ===
Allon was the highest-paid player outside of the First Vision at Lincoln. After just five games and three months at Sincil Bank he was on the move again, during which time manager Sam Ellis was replaced by John Beck.

=== Return to Hartlepool ===
Allon returned to Victoria Park when Hartlepool manager Keith Houchen paid £40,000 for his services. He scored nine goals in 24 games in 1995–96 to become joint top-scorer, but a persistent knee injury restricted his first-team appearances. He scored 11 goals in 34 games in 1996–97 to again become the club's top-scorer, as Hartlepool finished just four points above the bottom of the Football League under the stewardship of Mick Tait. His goal spree towards the end of the season helped the club to avoid a drop into the Conference. He only made five appearances in 1997–98, but scored twice, both against Colchester at Victoria Park, before he retired due to a patella fracture. His total of 79 goals for Hartlepool puts him in seventh place in their overall list of top scorers.

== Post-retirement ==
After retiring from football, Allon presented an award-winning BBC Inside Out documentary on grassroots sport and worked as a summariser at BBC Tees radio. Between 2006 and 2008 Allon worked under ex-Chelsea teammate Dennis Wise on the coaching staff at Leeds United. Allon suffered a mental breakdown following the death of his mother due to Alzheimer's disease in 2007.

== Career statistics ==
Appearances and goals by club, season and competition
Club	Season	League			FA Cup		Other		Total	
Club	Season	Division	Apps	Goals	Apps	Goals	Apps	Goals	Apps	Goals
Newcastle United	1984–85	First Division	1	0	0	0	0	0	1	0
Newcastle United	1985–86	First Division	3	1	0	0	0	0	3	1
Newcastle United	1986–87	First Division	5	1	0	0	1	0	6	1
Newcastle United	Total		9	2	0	0	1	0	10	2
Swansea City	1987–88	Fourth Division	32	12	2	0	4	1	38	13
Swansea City	1988–89	Third Division	2	0	0	0	0	0	2	0
Swansea City	Total		34	12	2	0	4	1	40	13
Hartlepool United	1988–89	Fourth Division	21	3	4	2	2	0	27	5
Hartlepool United	1989–90	Fourth Division	45	17	1	0	3	0	49	17
Hartlepool United	1990–91	Fourth Division	46	28	2	3	7	4	55	35
Hartlepool United	Total		112	48	7	5	12	4	131	57
Chelsea	1991–92	First Division	11	2	0	0	7	1	18	3
Chelsea	1992–93	Premier League	3	0	0	0	0	0	3	0
Chelsea	Total		14	2	0	0	7	1	21	3
Port Vale (loan)	1991–92	Second Division	6	0	0	0	0	0	6	0
Brentford	1992–93	First Division	24	6	1	0	5	5	30	11
Brentford	1993–94	Second Division	21	13	1	2	4	2	26	17
Brentford	Total		45	19	2	2	9	7	56	28
Southend United (loan)	1993–94	First Division	3	0	0	0	0	0	3	0
Port Vale	1993–94	Second Division	4	2	0	0	0	0	4	2
Port Vale	1994–95	First Division	19	7	2	1	1	0	22	8
Port Vale	Total		23	9	2	1	1	0	26	10
Lincoln City	1995–96	Third Division	4	0	0	0	1	0	5	0
Hartlepool United	1995–96	Third Division	22	8	0	0	2	1	24	9
Hartlepool United	1996–97	Third Division	30	9	1	0	3	2	34	11
Hartlepool United	1997–98	Third Division	4	2	0	0	1	0	5	2
Hartlepool United	Total		56	19	1	0	6	3	63	22
Career total			306	111	14	8	41	16	361	135

== Honours ==
Newcastle United

- FA Youth Cup: 1985

Swansea City

- Football League Fourth Division play-offs: 1988

Hartlepool United

- Football League Fourth Division third-place promotion: 1990–91

Port Vale

- Football League Second Division second-place promotion: 1993–94

Individual

- PFA Team of the Year: 1990–91 Fourth Division
- Hennessey Cognac North East Player of the Year: 1990–91
- North East Football Writers Player of the Year: 1990–91
