= Alain Horace =

Footballer (born 1971)

Personal information
- Full name: Alain Horace
- Date of birth: 4 December 1971 (age 54)
- Place of birth: Tananarive, Madagascar
- Height: 1.68 m (5 ft 6 in)
- Position: Midfielder

Senior career*
Years	Team	Apps	(Gls)
1991–1996	Mulhouse		(0)
1996	Hartlepool	1	(0)
1996–1999	Ayr United	26	(5)
- * Club domestic league appearances and goals

Alain Horace (born 4 December 1971) is a former professional footballer who played as a midfielder. He started his career at Mulhouse. After a trial period with Hartlepool, he moved to Ayr United in 1996. Horace left Ayr following a cruciate ligament injury.
