= Jon Sunderland =

English footballer

Personal information
- Full name: Jonathan Paul Sunderland
- Date of birth: 2 November 1975 (age 50)
- Place of birth: Newcastle upon Tyne, England
- Height: 5 ft 11 in (1.80 m)
- Position: Midfielder

Senior career*
Years	Team	Apps	(Gls)
1994–1996	Blackpool	2	(0)
1995	→ Northwich Victoria (loan)	?	(?)
1996	Scarborough	7	(0)
1996–1997	Hartlepool United	12	(1)
1997–1998	Gateshead	5	(0)
1999–2000	Ashington	?	(?)
2000–2002	Queen of the South	38	(1)
2002–2003	Whitley Bay	?	(?)
2003–200?	Ashington	?	(?)
2008–	Bedlington Terriers	?	(0)
- * Club domestic league appearances and goals as of 12:21, 3 February 2009 (UTC)

Jonathan Paul Sunderland (born 2 November 1975 in Newcastle upon Tyne) is an English retired professional footballer. He played as a midfielder.

Sunderland began his career as a trainee with Blackpool, turning professional in July 1994. He made just three appearances for Blackpool, all as a substitute, and had a spell on loan with Northwich Victoria in October 1995, before leaving to join Scarborough on a free transfer in March 1996. He was released by Scarborough that December and joined Hartlepool United on non-contract terms, scoring on his debut on 21 December 1996 as Hartlepool won 2–1 at home to Lincoln City, having only been on the pitch for eight minutes (as a substitute for Glen Davies).

He was released by Hartlepool at the end of the season and in August 1997 joined Gateshead. He later played for Ashington before joining Queen of the South on 19 June 2000. He played nearly 50 games before leaving in January 2002, joining Whitley Bay. In May 2002 he was part of the Bay side that won the FA Vase, although was sent-off for violent conduct as Bay won 1–0 against Tiptree United at Villa Park.

He left Bay to return to Ashington in August 2004, and helped the Colliers to promotion to the Northern League First Division in 2004.

He joined Bedlington Terriers in July 2008.
