= William A. Morgan (footballer) =

English footballer

William A. Morgan (born 1914, date of death unknown) was an English footballer, who played in goal for Coventry City between 1932 and 1939. He was born in Ryton-on-Tyne. He was 6 ft 0 in (1.83 m) tall.
