= Chris McDonald (footballer) =

Scottish footballer

Personal information
- Full name: Christopher William McDonald
- Date of birth: 14 October 1975 (age 51)
- Place of birth: Edinburgh, Scotland
- Position: Midfielder

Senior career*
Years	Team	Apps	(Gls)
1993–1995	Arsenal	0	(0)
1995–1996	Stoke City	0	(0)
1996–1998	Hartlepool United	20	(0)
- * Club domestic league appearances and goals

Christopher William McDonald (born 14 October 1975) is a Scottish former footballer who played for Arsenal, Stoke City and Hartlepool United.

== Career ==
McDonald was born in Edinburgh and began his career with Arsenal but failed to make the grade at Highbury and joined Stoke City in August 1995. He again failed to impress and spent the whole season in the reserves and joined Hartlepool United in the summer of 1996. He spent three seasons at Hartlepool making 20 league appearances.

== Career statistics ==
Appearances and goals by club, season and competition
Club	Season	League			FA Cup		League Cup		Other		Total	
Club	Season	Division	Apps	Goals	Apps	Goals	Apps	Goals	Apps	Goals	Apps	Goals
Arsenal	1994–95	Premier League	0	0	0	0	0	0	0	0	0	0
Stoke City	1995–96	First Division	0	0	0	0	0	0	0	0	0	0
Hartlepool United	1996–97	Third Division	9	0	0	0	2	0	0	0	11	0
Hartlepool United	1997–98	Third Division	6	0	0	0	0	0	0	0	6	0
Hartlepool United	1998–99	Third Division	5	0	0	0	1	0	0	0	6	0
Career total			20	0	0	0	3	0	0	0	23	0
