= Glen Davies (footballer) =

English footballer

Personal information
- Date of birth: 20 February 1976 (age 50)
- Place of birth: Brighton, England
- Height: 6 ft 1 in (1.85 m)
- Position: Central defender

Senior career*
Years	Team	Apps	(Gls)
1994–1996	Burnley	0	(0)
1996–1998	Hartlepool United	38	(1)
- Worthing
- Saltdean United
- Burgess Hill Town
- Ringmer
- Withdean 2000
- Worthing
2008–2010	Whitehawk		
- * Club domestic league appearances and goals

Glen Davies (born 20 February 1976) is a footballer who played in the Football League for Hartlepool United.

Davies finished his career as a player-coach at Whitehawk.
