= Saltergate =

Historic home of Chesterfield Football Club in England

Coordinates: 53°14′22″N 1°26′8″W

Recreation Ground
- Saltergate
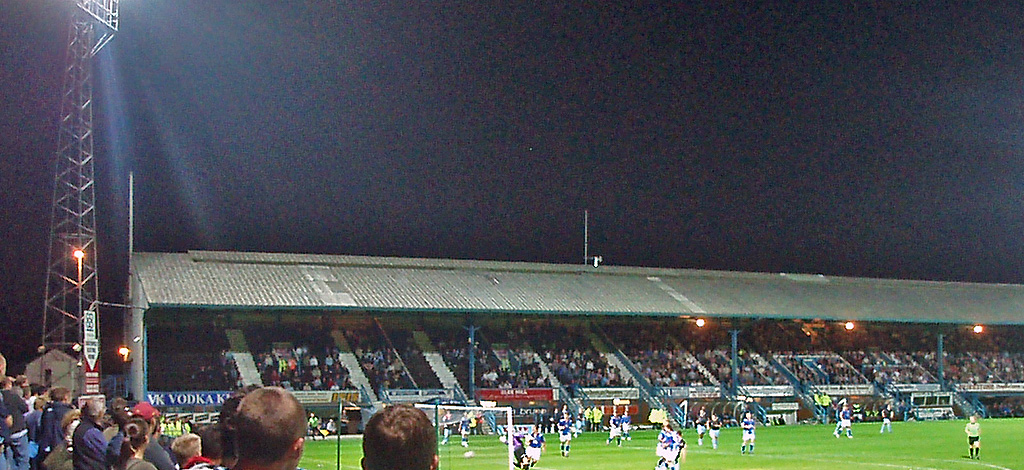
- Main Stand during a match in 2007.
- Interactive map of Recreation Ground
- Full name: Recreation Ground
- Location: Saltergate, Chesterfield, Derbyshire S40 4SX
- Owner: Chesterfield F.C.
- Capacity: 8,504
- Field size: 113 x 71 yards

Construction
- Opened: 1871
- Closed: 2010
- Demolished: 2012

Saltergate, officially the Recreation Ground, was the historic home of Chesterfield Football Club, and was in use from 1871 until the club's relocation in July 2010, a 139-year history that made it one of the oldest football grounds in England at the time of its closure. From the 1920s onward the name 'Saltergate' became predominant in popular references to the ground.

Tightly surrounded by housing, the football stadium was located near Chesterfield's town centre on the thoroughfare of the same name. The ground underwent only limited additional development after a new main stand was opened in 1936. Although plans to develop the site were explored, the club's fans ultimately voted in favour of pursuing a new ground in a 2003 ballot, with the site confirmed by a 2006 poll.

The final Chesterfield fixture at Saltergate, a Football League Two game against Bournemouth, was held on 8 May 2010. From the 2010–11 season, the team switched to the new b2net Stadium located in the Whittington Moor area of the town. An October 2010 publication from the club, Saltergate Sunset by Stuart Basson, chronicled the story of the ground.

In January 2012, the football club sold the Saltergate site to Barratt Homes. Its demolition to make way for a new housing development began in April and was completed in July 2012.

Today the road located in front of the site is still named Saltergate.

== History ==
=== 1871-1920 ===
In 1871, Chesterfield Football Club became a distinct entity from the Chesterfield Cricket Club, from which it was formed in the previous decade. Together, they took up the tenancy at the 'New Recreation Ground', Saltergate, located just 100 yards West of their previous home, and the ground was used for both sports for more than two decades. The site hosted its first game of football on 4 November 1871, with Rotherham providing the opposition in a 14-a-side match under Sheffield Rules. 11-a-side football was first played a few weeks later against the Sheffield F.A. team. A wooden pavilion was developed on the eastern side of the ground later in the 1870s but otherwise it remained simply an open field in this era. After the initial Chesterfield Football Club folded in 1881, a number of other local football teams used the pitch until the establishment of a second Chesterfield F.C. in 1884, later known as Chesterfield Town. The first recorded attendance, from Boxing Day 1889, put the crowd at 400 for a game against Sheffield Heeley Reserves. A small, uncovered grandstand with benched seating for around 400 was added early in the 1890s. With the football club steadily progressing toward employing its first semi-professional players, it was also able to take the cricket club's relocation in its stride during 1894, shouldering the full rent thereafter.

League football came to Saltergate in 1899 with Chesterfield Town's election to play in Division Two of the Football League. The club's step up necessitated remedial work on a pitch that sloped markedly from north to south, most notably the removal of a hill in the north west corner, the spoil from which was dumped at the Saltergate end. In addition, the grandstand was enlarged and roofed over, its capacity increasing to around 800 spectators. Fencing was erected on the Compton Street side to obscure the free view from adjacent back gardens (modest coverage later being added on this side). After a decade of financial struggle, other clubs who had invested in their stadia vied for an opening in the league and Chesterfield Town were voted out in 1909. In a bid to return, a running track was constructed around the perimeter, said to offer up to 10,000 fans a decent view, and a white picket fence was constructed around the pitch to replace the previous wire boundary. However, any ambitions proved short-lived. Faced with the abandonment of competitive football after the outbreak of the First World War the club was forced into voluntary liquidation in 1915. A new club with the same name was formed by a local restaurateur to play wartime football at Saltergate using locally based "guests" from Football League clubs. It was shut down by the FA for illegal payments in 1917. The following year saw no senior football in Chesterfield but Saltergate was used for local cup matches.

A fourth club – the present Chesterfield FC – was established in 1919 at the instigation of the local authority. A ground move to the Queen's Park Annexe also formed part of the vision, but did not progress after costings were received for a new stand. Thus the club continued to base itself at Saltergate as league football returned to the town in 1921.

=== 1921-1939 ===
The inter-war years represented Saltergate's main period of development.

When Chesterfield F.C. became founder members of the new Third Division North in 1921, the ground saw a new spurt of improvements. According to club historian Stuart Basson:

"Ground development left the club with a tidy Main Stand that ran some three-quarters of the pitch length and seated 1600, a roofed Popular Side and unovered ends. Terracing was made of cinder embankments, with a few wooden crush barriers walloped into the dirt at random-looking intervals. A wooden hut provided dressing room accommodation at the [northern] end of the stand."

In 1931, at a time of growing ambition for the club, terracing was cut into the cinder banking of the Kop and further earth removal from the Cross Street to Saltergate end was undertaken to level the pitch. In a successful push for promotion to the Second Division in 1931–32, 20,092 fans crammed into the ground to see the home team overtake Lincoln City for the top spot.

In 1936, the club borrowed around £14,000 to fund the erection of a new brick and steel main stand by Scottish architect Archibald Leitch. Demolition of the old wooden stand began at the close of the 1935–36 season, which again saw the club promoted to the Second Division. The official opening of the new stand came in November, with Sheffield United visiting for a league fixture and a new record of 26,519 paying for entry. With the completion of the new stand, all four sides of the ground had taken on an appearance that would still be recognisable at the time of its closure.

=== 1940-1979 ===
After the Second World War, the club faced a pressing need to raise funds to service the debt on the new stand and pay off the bank loan. Further ground development became somewhat limited as a result, though the club was still in a position to buy up several houses around the ground in the late 1940s. A move away from Saltergate was proposed again in 1949, this time to a site near Walton Hospital, but the council rejected the plan. Instead, the club made what was to be its final major investment in the ground prior to the millennium, engaging Leitch and Partners to renew all the ground's cinder terracing with concrete and install their patented crush barriers.

With relegation in 1951, average gates took a heavy knock and the decline continued over the decade as success eluded the club, which finally dropped to the fourth tier of English football for the first time in 1961. However, modest ground improvements still advanced after fundraising efforts by fans which allowed the Kop to be roofed in the same year. Despite acquiring second-hand lights in 1963, boardroom procrastination meant that Saltergate was the second-last league ground in England to install floodlights, with Chesterfield's first home game under lights not being played until the 1967–1968 season.

In 1979, the centre section of the Compton Street Terrace was re-roofed and a wooden television gantry added, the only notable ground work in the decade.

=== 1980 onwards - stay or go? ===
Financial problems in the early 1980s led the board to again consider a ground move to the Queen's Park Annexe, previously considered in 1920. In the aftermath of the 1985 Bradford City stadium fire and the general upgrading of football ground safety, a number of ground adaptations were undertaken, most significantly the construction of a series of emergency exits from the main stand in the form of flights of steps down to the pitch. Hundreds of seats also had to be removed to provide more gangways. The club was also ordered to install fencing around three sides of the pitch days before the start of the 1985–1986 season.

The additional cost of further works gave added spur to the idea of a move, but the discovery of a covenant on the Annexe that forbade its use for professional sport put paid to the club's favoured relocation site toward the end of the decade, though not the idea of relocation itself. The board persisted in putting forward alternate locations throughout the 1990s.

Talk of relocation dominated the 1994 AGM, with a sizeable group of supporters advocating the redevelopment of Saltergate, rather than its abandonment – including the Crooked Spireite fanzine. An early proposal showed a two tier kop, with smaller seated stands on the remaining three sides.

New plans for the club to leave Saltergate in favour of Wheeldon Mill emerged in October 1995 and were pursued avidly by Chairman Norton Lea in the face of substantial opposition. Though the scheme was blocked in 1998 when the council refused planning permission, subsequent unsuccessful attempts were made to revive the move well into the next decade. Having received a dispensation from the upgrading requirements of the 1989 Taylor Report based on relocation, the club was perpetually left without a plan B.

Thus, in late 2000, more than ten years after Taylor's report, the future of football at Saltergate became mired in crisis with three sides of the ground under threat of closure from the Football Licensing Authority. This was narrowly averted by a further dispensation for two sides of the ground amid turbulent times for the club under the chairmanship of Darren Brown.

Although 2001 saw a hastily organised fans group, the Chesterfield Football Supporters Society, replace Brown in controlling the club (he was later to be jailed for fraud), they faced a myriad of challenges related to ensuring Saltergate's future. It emerged that a debenture had been secured on the ground requiring that £200,000 be raised in just three weeks to fight off the threat of losing the stadium. Even with that met and the club in administration, much additional fundraising was required to deal with Saltergate's worst deficiencies. Thus, the ground saw a number of modest improvements, but remained an aged stadium, lacking many of the modern facilities available to rival clubs who had relocated or redeveloped their existing grounds.

In 2003, members of the Chesterfield Football Supporters Society voted in favour of the club pursuing relocation to Wheeldon Mill. A further vote in 2006 saw more than 90% back a plan to switch to the site of the former Dema Glass factory, near the Chesterfield - Sheffield bypass (Sheffield Road), around 1 mile (1.6 km) from the town centre.

=== End of an era ===
The 2009–10 season represented the club's last at Saltergate and its commercial department announced extensive plans to mark the 'End of an Era', including a book, DVD and end of season gala.

For 8 May 2010, the date of the final game, Chesterfield Community Trust organised a number of events to celebrate the history of Saltergate and bid it farewell. A heritage project at The Pomegranate Theatre presented a visual history of the club's time at the ground, including match footage from 1923 and photos dating back to 1900. Former players, including Albert Collins of the 1945 Football League War Cup semi-final side, were also present to share their memories. Afterwards, a brass band led a parade up to the match along Chesterfield High Street, swelling to an estimated 2,000 people on arrival.

Chesterfield F.C.'s final league fixture at Saltergate ended in a dramatic 2–1 win against AFC Bournemouth following an injury time goal from Derek Niven, the club's longest serving player. The goal prompted a brief and good-natured pitch invasion, which later attracted national media attention after footage of a disabled man rolling his wheelchair into the Bournemouth half attracted over 100,000 hits on YouTube.

In the weeks following the game, Saltergate hosted a series of final commemorative events, including an auction of fixtures and memorabilia that raised £20,000 for the club. Two of the crush barriers from Saltergate were also donated by the club to become museum pieces at the National Football Museum in Preston and the Scottish Football Museum in Glasgow. This had been arranged after the disused Compton Street-Cross Street corner terracing was found to include barriers designed and patented in 1906 by Scottish engineer and football ground designer Archibald Leitch, possibly the last-known examples of these once commonplace barriers.

In July 2010, the handover of the new ground was completed and the club departed Saltergate as its administrative base. However, it was announced that the ground would continue in use by the Chesterfield FC Community Trust for its Saturday Morning Club and Summer holiday Soccer Camp 'for the foreseeable future'. This community use was discontinued at the start of 2011.

On 31 May 2011, outline proposals for the development of up to 68 houses at the site were unanimously approved by Chesterfield Borough Council's planning committee. With planning permission obtained, the 4 1/2-acre site was put up for sale by the club in October 2011; meanwhile supporters began a Facebook Group calling for the streets in any future development to be named after former Chesterfield players. The club's development partner, GB Development Solutions, announced in December 2011 that it was close to exchanging contracts on the site and expected to complete the sale the following month. A building trade publication subsequently confirmed the sale of the ground to Barratt Homes for an undisclosed sum.

In January 2012, as the prospect of demolition neared, the club announced that a pair of original 1936 seats from the Saltergate main stand would gain a permanent home at the Football League's Preston headquarters, where they were to be refurbished and located in the reception area.

Demolition of the ground commenced in April 2012. By the end of June 2012, demolition of the structure was almost complete: the pitch had been removed, all four stands demolished and three of the floodlight pylons levelled. Work on rubble removal and levelling of the site was ongoing. In early July 2012, Barratt Homes began publicising details of the development to potential purchasers, stating that the first homes on the site would be available for occupancy in Autumn 2012. The final floodlight pylon – and last remaining Saltergate structure – was levelled on 13 July. Initial construction of the roads and first plots began at the end of July 2012.

In September 2012, Chesterfield Borough Council invited fans to nominate possible names for the road at the new development, from which seven options were subsequently put to the popular vote in an online poll. In December 2012, the winning street name was announced as 'Spire Heights', a play on the club nickname 'Spireites' when pronounced with a local accent.

In the autumn of 2014 Chesterfield Borough Council commissioned local artist Melanie Jackson to design a piece of artwork to mark the site of the football ground. The work, the "Spirit of Saltergate" was developed in consultation with supporters and was installed in March 2015. The artwork consists of a railing depicting the ground and fans as well as a tree guard and a series of bronze inlays linked to multimedia works.

== Structure and facilities ==
At the time of its closure, the four sides of the stadium were: The Main Stand, which was all-seated and contained an area designated as the Family Stand; the Spion Kop – the main terrace – known as the Karen Child Kop from 2008 for sponsorship reasons; the Compton Street Stand, running the full length of the pitch opposite the Main Stand; and the Cross Street End, an open terrace where away fans usually stood.

=== Main Stand ===
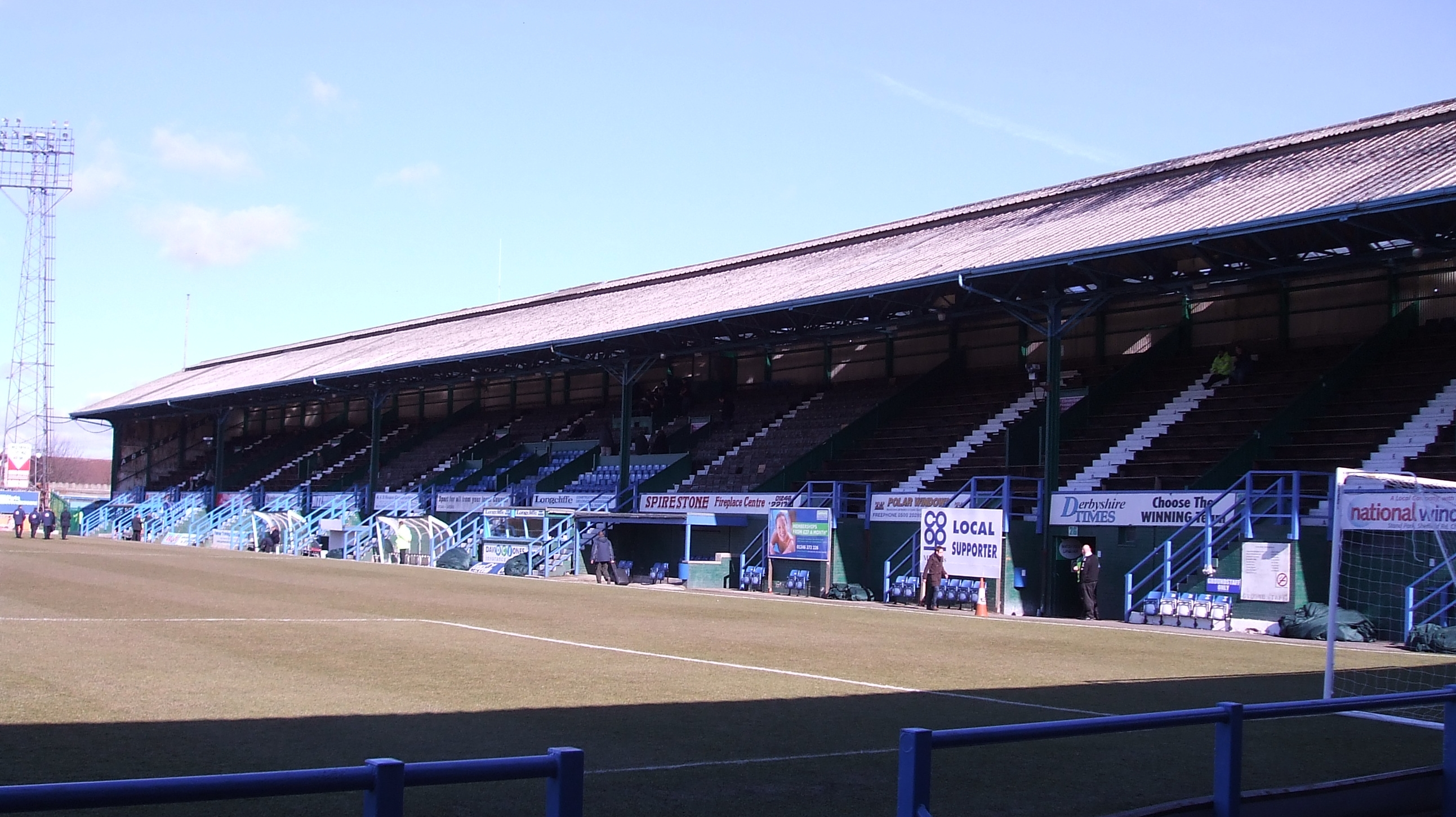
Main Stand pictured from the Kop

The covered Main Stand was opened in 1936 and was built at a cost of £14,000. In this era, the stand had two tiers, the bottom level being narrow terracing which did not require a tunnel for the players, who instead emerged through a door. This terracing was taken out of use in the late 20th century.

For the 2009–10 season it accommodated 2000 home supporters plus 450 seats for away fans. The stand was unusual, when viewed from aerial shot, in having a slight bend just to the right of halfway. In its later incarnation, it was also unusual in having its seating area raised above the pitch with a number of stairwells at the front of the stand leading up to the seats. There were also a number of supporting pillars in the stand which gave many seats a restricted view.

In its later years, the badly peeling paint and rusted exterior of the stand frequently attracted the derision of rival supporters.

Given that the design and appearance of the stand were similar to the one at Derby County's now-demolished Baseball Ground (by the same architect), the Saltergate structure was used to depict the Baseball Ground in the 2009 film The Damned United, set in the 1970s.

=== The Kop (Saltergate End) ===
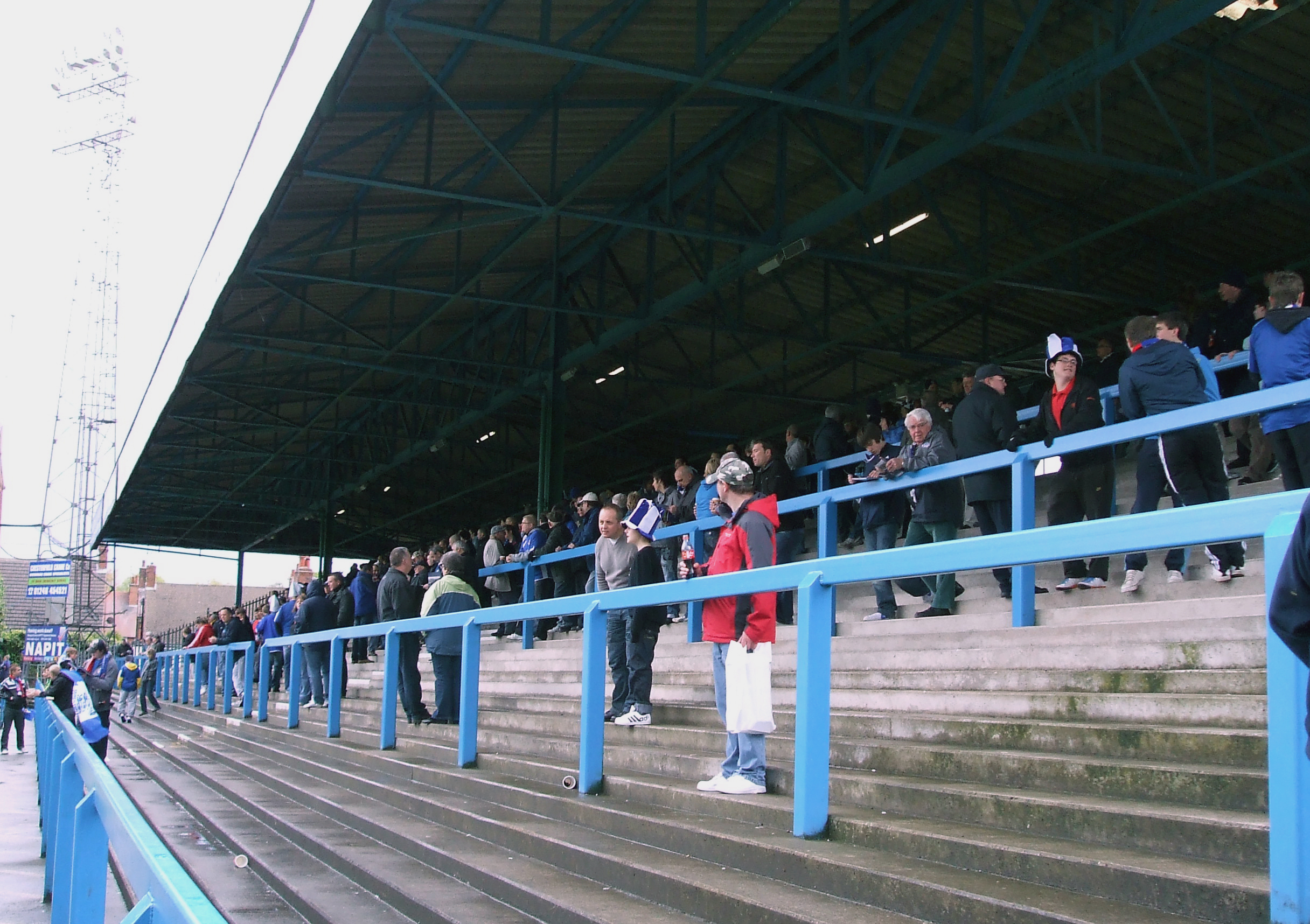
The Kop, filling early for the farewell game, May 2010

The Kop was the main terrace, accessed via turnstiles on Saltergate, the street which gives rise to the ground's popular name. As the area behind the goal, it tended to attract the club's most vocal standing support. For the 2009–10 season, its capacity was approximately 2,000.

As with many Victorian era football facilities, the Saltergate end of the ground spent many years as little more than a sloping mound. In the early 1920s, the construction of Cross Street at the opposite end of the ground led to earth and remnants of the cinder running track being used to build up the banking of the Kop. Terraced steps were cut into the cinder in the summer of 1931. At the turn of the 1950s, this was replaced by concrete terracing, cut to go below pitch level. Metal crush barriers were also fitted, replacing the old wooden ones. The Kop was roofed in 1960/1, at a cost of £10,000, paid for entirely by fundraising by the supporters club.

In December 2000, The Kop was closed for the remainder of the season on orders of the Football Licensing Authority and a major upgrading effort became one of the many summer challenges facing the fans who had taken over the club. Commencing at the start of July, a complete renewal of terracing work was completed in just 7 weeks.

Of the four sides of the ground, the Kop offered the most potential for redevelopment because of a relative abundance of space and was thus the focal point of all plans drawn up to keep the club at its historic home. 2002 architect plans envisaged a mix of seating and standing for a revamped Saltergate end.

In the absence of any such redevelopment, The Kop saw only a change of sponsorship in its closing years, becoming 'The Karen Child Kop' through a £20,000 deal with a local lottery winner.

Fans standing on the Kop for Saltergate's final fixture were experiencing not just their last game at the ground, but also their last opportunity to watch a Chesterfield home game from terracing, the new stadium being all-seater.

=== Compton Street Stand (Pop Side) ===
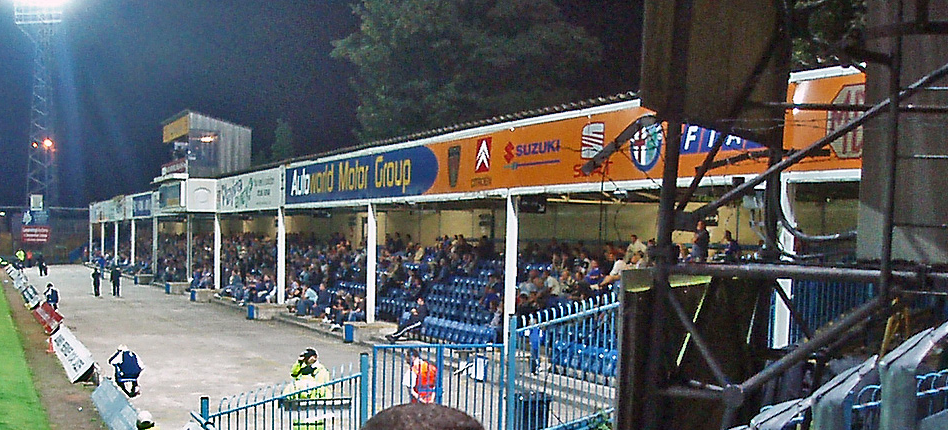
Compton Street Stand in 2007.

Compton Street, also known as the Popular or Pop Side, had a capacity of around 1,000 at the time of closure – the smallest of the four sides. It was partly covered (to the rear) and had a row of supporting pillars. Originally a terrace constructed in the early 1920s, Compton Street had a lot of work carried out on it during 2002 and was made all seated. The seating area lay about 4 metres from the pitch line. The roof had an unusual wooden television gantry perched on top. Until becoming a seated area, supporters could move freely between Compton Street and the Kop, resulting in the familiar half-time sight of fans flowing from the former to the latter for an improved view of the away goal.

=== Cross Street End (away) ===
Away fans were primarily housed in the Cross Street Terrace at one end of the ground, where 1,400 fans could be accommodated. This area was uncovered and open to the elements. This part of the ground also had work done on it in 2002.

At the time of Saltergate's closure, the wall at the back of the terrace was the ground's oldest surviving feature, built by the council in return for the land needed to create Cross Street in 1921. To accommodate the new street, the pitch was moved around 6 metres closer to Saltergate as well as being levelled by more than a metre along its length. However, following this upheaval at the Cross Street End, the away terracing saw little change thereafter, though the original wooden crush barriers made way for metal ones around 1950.

Football ground writer Simon Inglis described the Cross Street End in 1983 as "a low bank of terracing attractively backed by a castellated wall. Behind is a primary school... In the far corner is a group of turnstiles built by supporters in 1939 after [a] record attendance."

== Records and statistics ==
Saltergate's record attendance was 30,561, which was set when Chesterfield hosted Tottenham Hostpur in the FA Cup 5th Round in February 1938. The widely held belief that the record attendance was set against Newcastle United in April 1939 is discredited by the Football League's audited attendance for that game, which stands at 28,268 – though this does represent the grounds's highest league attendance.

According to the record books, a total of 3,159 first team matches were played at Saltergate, 1,827 of them league fixtures.

== Cricket and other uses ==
Saltergate was also home to Chesterfield Cricket Club from 1871 to 1894.

There are records of six cricket matches involving teams called Derbyshire or Chesterfield playing against the All England Eleven from 1858 to 1872. The first four of these would have been held at Chesterfield Cricket Club's first Recreation Ground site, 100 yards closer to the town; however Chesterfield Cricket Club played a United South of England Eleven in September 1871 and an All England Eleven in September 1872 after the move to the New Recreation Ground, Saltergate.

Derbyshire County Cricket Club, founded in 1870, staged two first-class matches at Saltergate. The first was a county match versus Lancashire in August 1874, which was drawn after the final day was rained off. The other opponents were the United North of England Eleven in August 1875, which the UNEE won by 90 runs. First-class cricket returned to Chesterfield in 1898 when Derbyshire began playing at the Queen's Park ground which is still in use. This location has also been the home of Chesterfield Cricket Club since its departure from Saltergate.

The stadium was also used on occasion to host rugby matches, concerts and community events.

In the 2009 film The Damned United, Saltergate stood in for Wembley Stadium, Carrow Road, Bloomfield Road and most prominently, Derby County's Baseball Ground (demolished in 2003). The ground was chosen because it had not had any significant modifications since the 1970s, though some repainting work was done by the production team to differentiate the various locations represented. Saltergate's film role earnt the club added income of £50,000 in 2007–08.
