= List of EFL Championship stadiums =

Since the inception of the EFL Championship, England's current second tier, in 2004, there have been 65 stadiums used in the League. Following the Hillsborough Disaster in 1989, the Taylor Report recommended the abolition of standing terraces by the start of the 1994–95 season, to be replaced by all-seater stadiums. Certain grounds have had terracing in recent years.

== Stadiums ==
Those marked in bold indicate teams playing in the 2026–27 season, while those in italics have been demolished.

Stadium	Image	Club	Location	Opened	Closed	Capacity	Coordinates	Ref(s)
Adams Park		Wycombe Wanderers	High Wycombe	1990		8,828	51°37′50.0″N 0°48′01.0″W	
**Ashton Gate**		Bristol City	Bristol	1904		26,462	51°26′24.54″N 2°37′13.09″W	
**Bet365 Stadium**		Stoke City	Stoke-on-Trent	1997		30,089	52°59′18″N 2°10′32″W	Previously called the Britannia Stadium
Bloomfield Road		Blackpool	Blackpool	1899		c. 16,500	53°48′17″N 3°2′53″W	
Boleyn Ground (Upton Park)		West Ham United	London	1904	2016	35,016	51°31′55″N 0°2′22″E	
**Bramall Lane**		Sheffield United	Sheffield	1855		32,050	53°22′13″N 1°28′15″W	
Brentford Community Stadium		Brentford	London	2020		17,250	51°29′26.97″N 0°17′19.32″W	
Brick Community Stadium		Wigan Athletic	Wigan	1999		25,138	53°32′52″N 2°39′14″W	Previously called JJB Stadium and DW Stadium
**Cardiff City Stadium**		Cardiff City	Cardiff	2009		33,280	51°28′22″N 3°12′11″W	
**Carrow Road**		Norwich City	Norwich	1935		27,150	52°37′19.66″N 1°18′13.15″E	
City Ground		Nottingham Forest	Nottingham	1898		31,212	52°56′24″N 1°7′58″W	
Club Doncaster Sports Village		Doncaster Rovers	Doncaster	2006		15,231	53°30′35″N 1°6′50″W	Previously called Keepmoat Stadium and Eco-Power Stadium
Coventry Building Society Arena		Coventry City	Coventry	2005		32,609	52°26′53″N 1°29′44″W	Previously called Ricoh Arena
Craven Cottage		Fulham	London	1896		28,107	51°28′30″N 0°13′18″W	
Dean Court		Bournemouth	Bournemouth	1910		12,357	50°44′07″N 1°50′18″W	
**Deepdale**		Preston North End	Preston	1860		23,404	53°46′20″N 2°41′17″W	
**Elland Road**		Leeds United	Leeds	1897		37,633	53°46′40″N 1°34′20″W	
**Ewood Park**		Blackburn Rovers	Blackburn	1883		31,367	53°43′43″N 2°29′21″W	
Falmer Stadium		Brighton & Hove Albion	Brighton	2011		32,176	50°51′42.56″N 0°4′59.80″W	Known as the American Express Stadium
**Fratton Park**		Portsmouth	Portsmouth	1898		20,867	50°47′47″N 1°3′50″W	
Glanford Park		Scunthorpe United	Scunthorpe	1988		9,088	53°35′12.21″N 0°41′42.96″W	
Gresty Road		Crewe Alexandra	Crewe	1906		10,153	53°5′14.71″N 2°26′8.69″W	Known as the Mornflake Stadium
Griffin Park		Brentford	London	1904	2020	12,300	51°29′17.46″N 0°18′9.50″W	
Highfield Road		Coventry City	Coventry	1899	2005	23,489	52°24′43″N 1°29′24″W	
Hillsborough		Sheffield Wednesday	Sheffield	1899		34,845	53°24′41″N 1°30′2″W	
Home Park		Plymouth Argyle	Plymouth	1893		17,900	50°23′17″N 4°09′3″W	
Huish Park		Yeovil Town	Yeovil	1990		9,565	50°57′01″N 2°40′29.57″W	
Kassam Stadium		Oxford United	Oxford	2001		12,500	51°42′59.11″N 1°12′29.04″W	
Kenilworth Road		Luton Town	Luton	1905		12,056	51°53′03″N 0°25′54″W	
King Power Stadium		Leicester City	Leicester	2002		32,259	52°37′13″N 1°8′32″W	Previously called Walkers Stadium
Kirklees Stadium		Huddersfield Town	Huddersfield	1994		24,121	53°39′15″N 1°46′6″W	
Layer Road		Colchester United	Colchester	1910	2008	6,320	51°52′37.25″N 0°53′00.33″E	
London Road		Peterborough United	Peterborough	1913		13,511	52°33′52.91″N 0°14′25.46″W	
**Loftus Road**		Queens Park Rangers	London	1904		18,360	51°30′33″N 0°13′56″W	Previously called Kiyan Prince Foundation Stadium
Madejski Stadium		Reading	Reading	1998		24,161	51°25′20″N 0°58′58″W	
Millmoor		Rotherham United	Rotherham	1907	2008	8,300	53°25′42.12″N 1°22′12.83″W	
MKM Stadium		Hull City	Kingston upon Hull	2002		25,586	53°44′46″N 0°22′4″W	Previously called KC Stadium and KCOM Stadium
**Molineux Stadium**		Wolverhampton Wanderers	Wolverhampton	1889		31,750	52°35′25″N 2°07′49″W	
New York Stadium		Rotherham United	Rotherham	2013		12,021	53.4279°N 1.362°W	
Ninian Park		Cardiff City	Cardiff	1910	2009	21,508	51°28′29″N 3°12′00″W	
Oakwell		Barnsley	Barnsley	1888		23,287	53°33′8″N 1°28′3″W	
Pirelli Stadium		Burton Albion	Burton upon Trent	2005		6,912	52°49′18.86″N 1°37′37.05″W	
Portman Road		Ipswich Town	Ipswich	1884		30,294	52°3′18.22″N 1°8′41.39″E	
**Pride Park Stadium**		Derby County	Derby	1997		32,956	52°54′54″N 1°26′50″W	
Priestfield Stadium		Gillingham	Gillingham	1893		11,582	51°23′3.3″N 0°33′38.71″E	
**Riverside Stadium**		Middlesbrough	Middlesbrough	1995		34,742	54°34′42″N 1°13′1″W	
Roots Hall	Roots Hall	Southend United	Southend-on-Sea	1952		12,392	51°32′56.46″N 0°42′5.61″E	
Selhurst Park	Selhurst Park	Crystal Palace	London	1924		26,255	51°23′54″N 0°5′8″W	
**Stadium of Light**		Sunderland	Sunderland	1997		49,000	54°54′52″N 1°23′18″W	
Stadium MK		Milton Keynes Dons	Milton Keynes	2007		30,500	52°00′34″N 00°44′00″W	
St Andrew's		Birmingham City	Birmingham	1906		29,409	52°28′32.53″N 1°52′05.48″W	
St James' Park		Newcastle United	Newcastle	1892		52,350	54°58′32″N 1°37′18″W	
St Mary's Stadium		Southampton	Southampton	2001		32,384	50°54′21″N 1°23′28″W	
**Swansea.com Stadium**		Swansea City	Swansea	2005		21,088	51.6422°N 3.9351°W	Previously known as the Liberty Stadium
**The Hawthorns**		West Bromwich Albion	West Bromwich	1900		26,868	52°30′33″N 1°57′50″W	
**The Den**		Millwall	London	1993		20,146	51°29′9.43″N 0°3′3.42″W	
The Valley		Charlton Athletic	London	1919		27,111	51°29′11″N 0°2′11″E	
Toughsheet Community Stadium		Bolton Wanderers	Bolton	1997		28,723	53°34′50″N 2°32′8″W	Previously known as the Reebok Stadium, Macron Stadium and University of Bolton Stadium
**Turf Moor**		Burnley	Burnley	1883		21,944	53°47′21″N 2°13′49″W	
**Vicarage Road**		Watford	Watford	1922		22,220	51°38′59.41″N 0°24′5.35″W	
Villa Park		Aston Villa	Birmingham	1897		42,640	52°30′33″N 1°53′5″W	
Withdean Stadium		Brighton & Hove Albion	Brighton	1936	2011	8,850	50°51′7″N 0°9′32″W	
