= Simon Inglis =

British author

- Born: 1955 (age 70–71); Sparkhill, Birmingham, England
- Occupations: Author, editor, architectural historian, lecturer

Simon Inglis (born 1955) is an author, editor, architectural historian and lecturer. He specialises in the history, heritage and architecture of sport and recreation. Inglis is best known for his work on football history and stadiums, and as editor of the Played in Britain series for English Heritage (later Historic England).

== Early life ==
Simon Inglis was born in Birmingham in 1955 and brought up in Moseley. He was a pupil at King Edward's School, Birmingham, leaving in 1973. Inglis read History and the History of Architecture at University College London, before training as a teacher in Leeds and teaching history at a comprehensive school in Walthamstow, north London.

== Career ==
After six months travelling in Central and South America, from where he submitted articles to The Guardian, Simon Inglis settled in Manchester in 1980. He has since freelanced for a range of publications, including The Guardian, The Observer, the Financial Times, tRadio Times and World Soccer magazine.

His book Football Grounds of England and Wales was published in 1983. Renowned sports journalist Frank Keating named it as his favourite sports book of the 20th century and it was chosen by readers of The Times as the fourth best football book of all time. Following the Bradford City stadium fire, the book was updated as The Football Grounds of Great Britain in 1987, and updated again in 1996 after the Hillsborough disaster, as Football Grounds of Britain. Inglis also wrote The Football Grounds of Europe, in 1990.

After the Hillsborough disaster, Inglis was appointed to sit on two bodies set up on the recommendation of the Taylor Report; the Football Stadia Advisory Council (FSADC) and the Football Licensing Authority (FLA), renamed the Sports Grounds Safety Authority in 2011. During the 1990s, Inglis edited a number of design guidelines and technical documents for the FSADC on topics such as stadium seating, toilets, roofs, disabled access and terraces. For the FLA, Inglis edited the Fourth Edition of the Guide to Safety at Sports Grounds, commonly known as the Green Guide, which was published in 1997. He also edited the sixth edition of the Green Guide for the SGSA in 2018.

In 1996, Inglis was appointed as a consultant on the National Stadium project, set up by the Sports Council to evaluate bids from Manchester, Birmingham, Sheffield and Bradford to replace Wembley Stadium. The process culminated in Wembley National Stadium Ltd winning the bid and the original Wembley Stadium being demolished and replaced with a new ground. Inglis later summarised the design process in an architectural monograph simply called 'Wembley Stadium', co-authored by the stadium's lead architect, Norman Foster.

From 1988 to 2000, Inglis embarked upon a series of visits to stadiums and stadium communities around the world, resulting in the publication of Sightlines: A Stadium Odyssey in 2000. Extracts from the book were later turned into an audiobook. During this same period he also curated ‘Making a Stand’, a stadium-related exhibition at the Building Centre in London, and a touring exhibition for the British Council in support of the England 2006 FIFA World Cup bid.

In 2002, Inglis was one of a number of architectural historians appointed by English Heritage for its Sporting Chance study, focusing on sporting heritage in Manchester, to coincide with the city hosting the 2002 Commonwealth Games. This partnership resulted in the launch, in 2004, of the Played in Britain series, with English Heritage as the publisher and Inglis as editor. The series sought to raise public awareness of Britain's sporting heritage by publishing a series of illustrated books on Manchester, Birmingham, Liverpool, Glasgow, Tyne and Wear, and London, and on sporting themes.

Inglis's illustrated biography of the Scottish football ground designer Archibald Leitch, Engineering Archie, traced the career of a previously obscure engineer who had been responsible for designing many of British football's leading football grounds during the first half of the 20th century, including Highbury, Old Trafford, Ibrox Park, and stands at Aston Villa, Liverpool, Everton, Tottenham, Fulham and Chelsea. Engineering Archie was runner-up for the William Hill Sports Book of the Year Award 2005.

Played in London: Charting the Heritage of a City at Play, was published by English Heritage in 2014 and was shortlisted for the William Hill Sports Book of the Year Award 2014. The book was also selected as their Book of the Year by both the Londonist website and the London Historians group.

Inglis's research for Played in London led him to propose the listing of The Rom skatepark in Hornchurch, Essex, which was opened in 1978. The proposal was approved in 2014, making the Rom the first of its kind to be listed in Europe. Other buildings listed as a result of Inglis's research for Played in London include a late Victorian tennis pavilion in Beckenham, a 1930s diving board at the former Purley Lido, a 1930s squash court in Hammersmith and Britain's oldest surviving concrete cantilevered grandstand at Summers Lane, Finchley.

Inglis has also been a co-author of books about sporting heritage, including Great Lengths: the Historic Indoor Swimming Pools of Britain and - with Steve Beauchampé - Played in Birmingham, in 2006. The latter book led both authors to become active in the campaign to save Moseley Road Baths from closure as a swimming facility. Essential repairs were completed in 2020 and one pool remains open for swimming.

In addition to his writing, Inglis lectures on sporting heritage for The Arts Society, and for the International Centre for Sports History and Culture at De Montfort University.

== Personal life ==
Simon Inglis has lived in London since 1984. He is married to former TV presenter Jackie Spreckley, who has managed the production of Played in Britain since 2004. Inglis describes himself on Twitter as an Aston Villa fan, ‘albeit at a distance in recent years’. He has also been actively involved in the Friends of West Hampstead Library since its inception in 1998.

== Selected bibliography ==
• Football Grounds of England and Wales. London: HarperCollins Willow (1983) ISBN 0-00-218189-4

• Soccer in the Dock. London: HarperCollins Willow (1985) ISBN 0-00-2181622

• Football Grounds of Great Britain. London: HarperCollins Willow (1987) ISBN 0-00-218426-5

• League Football and the Men Who Made It: The Official Centenary History of the Football League, 1888–1988. London: HarperCollins Willow (1988) ISBN 0-00-218242-4

• The Football Grounds of Europe. London: HarperCollins Willow (1990) ISBN 0-00-218305-6

• Football Grounds of Britain. London: HarperCollins Willow (1996) ISBN 0-00-2184265

• Villa Park: 100 Years. Birmingham: Sports Projects (1997) ISBN 0-946866-43-0

• Sightlines: A Stadium Odyssey. London: Yellow Jersey Press (2000) ISBN 0-224059696

• Played in Manchester: The architectural heritage of a city at play (Played in Britain series). London: English Heritage (2004) ISBN 1-873592-78-7

• Engineering Archie: Archibald Leitch - Football Ground Designer (Played in Britain series). London: English Heritage (2005) ISBN 1-85074-918-3

• A Load of Old Balls (Played in Britain series). London: Malavan Media (2005) ISBN 0-9547445-2-7

• Played in Birmingham: Charting the heritage of a city at play (co-author with Steve Beauchampé, Played in Britain series). London: English Heritage (2006) ISBN 0-9547445-1-9

• Great Lengths: The historic indoor swimming pools of Britain (co-author with Dr Ian Gordon, Played in Britain series). London: English Heritage (2009) ISBN 978-1-9056245-2-2

• Played in London: Charting the heritage of a city at play (Played in Britain series) London: English Heritage (2014) ISBN 978-1-84802-057-3

• Guide to Safety at Sports Grounds. London: Sports Grounds Safety Authority (2018) ISBN 978-1-9164583-0-7
