= 2021 Women's Euro Beach Soccer League =

Tournament details
- Host country: Portugal
- Dates: 17 June – 12 September
- Teams: 8 (from 1 confederation)
- Venue(s): 2 (in 2 host cities)

Final positions
- Champions: Russia (1st title)
- Runners-up: England
- Third place: Spain
- Fourth place: Switzerland

Tournament statistics
- Matches played: 28
- Goals scored: 167 (5.96 per match)

Locations of the regular season event and the Superfinal of the 2021 Women's Euro Beach Soccer League in Portugal.

The 2021 Women's Euro Beach Soccer League was the first edition of the Women's Euro Beach Soccer League (WEBSL). It is the annual, premier competition in European beach soccer contested between women's national teams, succeeding the Women's Euro Beach Soccer Cup (2016–19). Organised by Beach Soccer Worldwide (BSWW), it is the women's version of the men's long-running Euro Beach Soccer League, which began in 1998.

The league consisted of two phases: a single round of fixtures comprising the regular season, which determined the seedings for the post-season event, the Superfinal, in which the teams then directly contested the league title, with the winners becoming WEBSL champions; both events took place in Portugal.

Russia were defending European champions, having won the final edition of the Women's Euro Beach Soccer Cup in 2019, and successfully retained their European crown by winning the league title, beating England 8–2 in the final.

== Teams ==
Eight teams took part in the inaugural season. Portugal entered straight into the Superfinal as hosts.

The numbers in parentheses show the European ranking of each team prior to the start of the season, out of 9 nations.

- Spain (1st)
- England (2nd)
- Russia (3rd)
- Switzerland (4th)
- Czech Republic (5th)
- Netherlands (6th)
- Portugal (8th)
- Ukraine (n/a)

== Regular season (Nazaré, 17–20 June) ==
Matches are listed as local time in Nazaré, WEST (UTC+1)

The matches took place at one of two venues on Praia de Nazaré (Nazaré Beach): One seated arena, the Estádio do Viveiro (Viveiro Stadium), and one purpose made pitch, located adjacent to the main stadium, simply known as Pitch 2. Due to COVID-19 concerns, the matches were played behind closed doors.

All teams qualified for the Superfinal; the final standings of the regular season event were used to determine the seedings for the Superfinal.

=== Group stage ===
Key: Advance to –	Final /	3rd place match /	5th place match

==== Group 1 ====
Pos	Team	Pld	W	W+	WP	L	GF	GA	GD	Pts
1	Spain	3	3	0	0	0	8	4	+4	9
2	Switzerland	3	2	0	0	1	10	4	+6	6
3	Ukraine	3	1	0	0	2	7	13	−6	3
4	Netherlands	3	0	0	0	3	5	9	−4	0

Source: BSWW

17 June 2021	Switzerland	3–1	Netherlands	Pitch 2
12:45	Vincenz 9', 27'; Bachman 16'	Report	Veschoor 25'	Referee: Łukasz Ostrowski (Poland)

17 June 2021	Ukraine	2–4	Spain	Estádio do Viveiro
16:45	Davydenko 14'; Klipachenko 32'	Report	Lorena 9'; Carmen 12', 29'; Sara 18'	Referee: Ingilab Mammadov (Azerbaijan)

18 June 2021	Switzerland	6–1	Ukraine	Pitch 2
12:45	Grüter 6'; Morger 7', 32'; Keller 15'; Schenk 27'; Vincenz 35'	Report	Tykhonova 3'	Referee: Gionni Matticoli (Italy)

18 June 2021	Spain	2–1	Netherlands	Estádio do Viveiro
16:45	Carmen 6'; Mirón 14'	Report	Bos 36'	Referee: Annett Unterbeck (Germany)

19 June 2021	Netherlands	3–4	Ukraine	Pitch 2
12:45	Nidia 3'; Drost 8'; Verschoor 30'	Report	Vypasniak 1'; Terekh 7'; Klipachenko 17'; Khrystiuk 30'	Referee: Wilson Soares (Portugal)

19 June 2021	Spain	2–1	Switzerland	Estádio do Viveiro
16:45	Carmen 11'; Sara 34'	Report		Referee: Viktor Listratov (Russia)

==== Group 2 ====
Pos	Team	Pld	W	W+	WP	L	GF	GA	GD	Pts
1	England	2	2	0	0	0	8	1	+7	6
2	Russia	2	1	0	0	1	5	4	+1	3
3	Czech Republic	2	0	0	0	2	1	9	−8	0

Source: BSWW

17 June 2021	Russia	4–1	Czech Republic	Estádio do Viveiro
10:00	Gorshkova 12', 20'; Cherniakova 25'; Zaitseva 33'	Report	Jablončíková 25'	Referee: Sergio Soares (Portugal)

18 June 2021	England	5–0	Czech Republic	Estádio do Viveiro
10:00	Martin 3'; Clark 9'; Hillier 17'; Short 33'; Kempson 35'	Report		Referee: Wilson Soares (Portugal)

19 June 2021	England	3–1	Russia	Estádio do Viveiro
10:00	Haughton 3'; Kempson 27'; Martin 32'	https://beachsoccer.com/match/england-vs-russia/ Report	Bychkova 26'	Referee: Francisco Costa (Portugal)

=== Play-offs ===
20 June 2021 Fifth place match	Ukraine	2–0	Czech Republic	Estádio do Viveiro
10:30	Tykhonova 12'; Klipachenko 33'	Report		Referee: Francisco de Oses Bumedien (Spain)

20 June 2021 Third place match	Switzerland	0–6	Russia	Estádio do Viveiro
11:45		Report	Zaitseva 7'; Akylbaeva 10'; Shkvara 17', 31'; Bychkova 20'; Cherniakova 31'	Referee: Daniel Yuste (Spain)

20 June 2021 Final	Spain	1–3	England	Estádio do Viveiro
14:00	Estela	Report	Barron 25'; Jessica 31' (o.g.); Clark 33'	Referee: Renata Foris (Hungary)

=== Final standings ===
Pos	Team
1	England
2	Spain
3	Russia
4	Switzerland
5	Ukraine
6	Czech Republic
7	Netherlands

=== Awards ===
The following were presented after the conclusion of the final day's matches.

Stage Winners trophy	Top scorer(s)		Best player	Best goalkeeper
England	(Spain) Carmen Fresneda	4 goals	(Spain) Andrea Mirón	(Ukraine) Anastasiia Terekh

== Superfinal (Figueira da Foz, 9–12 September) ==
Matches are listed as local time in Figueira da Foz, WEST (UTC+1).

The winners of the Superfinal were crowned 2021 WEBSL champions.

=== Group stage ===
Key: Advance to –	Final /	3rd place match /	5th place match /	7th place match /	(H) Hosts

==== Group 1 ====
Pos	Team	Pld	W	W+	WP	L	GF	GA	GD	Pts
1	England	3	3	0	0	0	16	4	+12	9
2	Switzerland	3	2	0	0	1	9	7	+2	6
3	Portugal (H)	3	1	0	0	2	8	8	0	3
4	Czech Republic	3	0	0	0	3	3	17	–14	0

9 September 2021	Switzerland	4–1	Czech Republic	Pitch 2
12:00	Bachmann 3', 13'; Marti 12', 22'	Report	Meyer 32' (o.g.)	Referee: Viktor Listratov (Russia)

9 September 2021	Portugal	2–3	England	Main stadium
15:45	J. Meira 12'; Carolina 25'	Report	Clark 21', 33'; Martin 32'	Referee: Viktor Listratov (Russia)

10 September 2021	England	8–0	Czech Republic	Pitch 2
12:00	Clark 7', 14'; Kempson 13', 21'; James 19'; C. Short 22', 27', 35'	Report		Referee: Fiammetta Susanna (Italy)

10 September 2021	Switzerland	3–1	Portugal	Main stadium
15:45	Gebert 26', 27'; Keller 31'	Report	Erica 31'	Referee: Saverio Bottalico (Italy)

11 September 2021	England	5–2	Switzerland	Pitch 2
12:00	Clark 1', 11'; Haughton 8'; Kempson 13', 19'	Report	Kalin 17'; Bachmann 23'	Referee: Cristobal Montoro (Spain)

11 September 2021	Czech Republic	2–5	Portugal	Main stadium
18:30	Pilousková 15'; Mody 19'	Report	Ema T. 14'; Erica 15', 30'; Carolina 27'; Flores 34'	Referee: Malte Gerhardt (Germany)

==== Group 2 ====
Pos	Team	Pld	W	W+	WP	L	GF	GA	GD	Pts
1	Russia	3	3	0	0	0	15	6	+9	9
2	Spain	3	2	0	0	1	10	6	+4	6
3	Ukraine	3	1	0	0	2	11	16	–5	3
4	Netherlands	3	0	0	0	3	9	17	–8	0

9 September 2021	Russia	4–2	Ukraine	Main stadium
12:00	Petrova 8', 21'; Zubilova 25'; Akylbaeva 34'	Report	Kramna 11'; Tykhonova 16'	Referee: Matthieu Dor (France)

9 September 2021	Netherlands	0–3	Spain	Pitch 2
13:15		Report	Soto 9'; Carol Glez 19'; Barquero 25'	Referee: Francisco Costa (Portugal)

10 September 2021	Russia	7–4	Netherlands	Main stadium
12:00	Sheva 5'; Kanaeva 9'; Cherniakova 10', 35'; Akylbaeva 12'; Bazhanova 12', 34'	Report	Chelly 14', 20'; Sylvana 19'; Bouchra 33'	Referee: Antonio Pereira (Portugal)

10 September 2021	Spain	7–2	Ukraine	Pitch 2
13:15	Fanjul 6'; Carol Glez 9'; Nati 10'; Delia 14'; Sara 17'; Barquero 19', 28'	Report	Tykhonova 6'; Terekh 9'	Referee: Vladimir Tashkov (Bulgaria)

11 September 2021	Spain	0–4	Russia	Main stadium
12:00		Report	Akylbaeva 20'; Zubilova 28', 35'; Zaitseva 32'	Referee: Csaba Baghy (Hungary)

11 September 2021	Ukraine	7–5	Netherlands	Pitch 2
13:15	Tykhonova 6'; Terekh 7'; Vypasniak 9', 12', 33'; Babenko 9'; Dekhitar 10'	Report	Chelly 5', 34', 35'; Sylvana 18'; Bouchra 28'	Referee: Francisco Costa (Portugal)

=== Play-off stage ===
==== Seventh place play-off ====
12 September 2021
10:00

Czech Republic	6–6 (a.e.t.)	Netherlands
Mody 1', 10', 27', 36'; Hrušková 32'; Červeňáková 33'	Report	Aaike 3'; Rosa 14', 27'; Sylvana 15', 29'; Chelly 28'
Penalties
	1–3

Pitch 2
Referee: Saverio Bottalico (Italy)

==== Fifth place play-off ====
12 September 2021
15:15

Portugal	2–1	Ukraine
Jamila 28'; J. Meira 32'	Report	Kostiuk 26'

Main stadium
Referee: Cristobal Montoro (Spain)

==== Third place play-off ====
12 September 2021
12:45

Switzerland	2–3 (a.e.t.)	Spain
Bachmann 14'; Gebert 16'	Report	Jessica 11', 13'; Sara 37'

Pitch 2
Referee: Annett Unterbeck (Germany)

==== Superfinal match ====
12 September 2021
16:30

England	2–8	Russia
Hillier 11'; Clark 25'	Report	Kempson 4' (o.g.); Bazhanova 5'; Petrova 13', 29'; Cherniakova 19'; Zubilova 21'; Zaitseva 25'; Scadding 32' (o.g.)

Main stadium
Referee: Antonio Pereira (Portugal)

=== Awards ===
==== Winners trophy ====
2021 Women's Euro Beach Soccer League
Champions

Russia
First title

==== Individual awards ====
Awarded for feats achieved in the Superfinal only

Top scorer(s)
(England) Molly Clark
7 goals
Best player
(Russia) Iana Zubilova
Best goalkeeper
(Russia) Anna Akylbaeva

=== Final standings ===
Pos	Team	Result
1	Russia	WEBSL Champions (1st title)
2	England	Runners-up
3	Spain	Third place
4	Switzerland	
5	Portugal	
6	Ukraine	
7	Netherlands	
8	Czech Republic	

== Top scorers ==
The following table list the top 10 scorers of the 2021 WEBSL, including goals scored in both the regular and post season events.

Note there are no awards presented for these season-encompassing scoring feats, the tables are for statistical purposes only. Scoring awards were bestowed per stage, with the primary award that which was presented in the Superfinal.

Rank	Player	Pld	Goals
1	(England) Molly Clark	7	9
2	(Netherlands) Chelly Drost	7	7
3	(England) Sarah Kempson	7	6
4	(Russia) Anna Cherniakova	7	5
4	(Czech Republic) Matějková Markéta	7	5
4	(Switzerland) Eva Bachmann	8	5
4	(Ukraine) Mariia Tykhonova	8	5
8	(Russia) Anna Petrova	6	4
8	(Netherlands) Sylvana Tieleman	6	4
8	(Russia) Natalia Zaitseva	6	4
8	(Russia) Anna Akylbaeva	7	4
8	(Spain) Carmen Fresneda	7	4
8	(England) Connie Short	7	4
8	(Russia) Iana Zubilova	7	4
8	(Spain) Sara Gonzalez	8	4
8	(Ukraine) Myroslava Vypasniak	8	4

Sources: Regular season, Superfinal

== See also ==
- 2021 Euro Beach Soccer League (men's)
