= Folding seat =

Seat that folds away to occupy less space

A folding seat (or a Tip Up Seat) is a seat that folds away, or tips up automatically, so as to occupy less space. These are often found in public spaces, installed on public vehicles and waiting rooms to ensure unused seats create additional space.

When installed on a transit bus, it makes room for a wheelchair or two. When installed on a passenger car, it provides extra seating.

In churches, it may have a projection called a misericord, which offers some support to a person standing in front when the seat is folded.

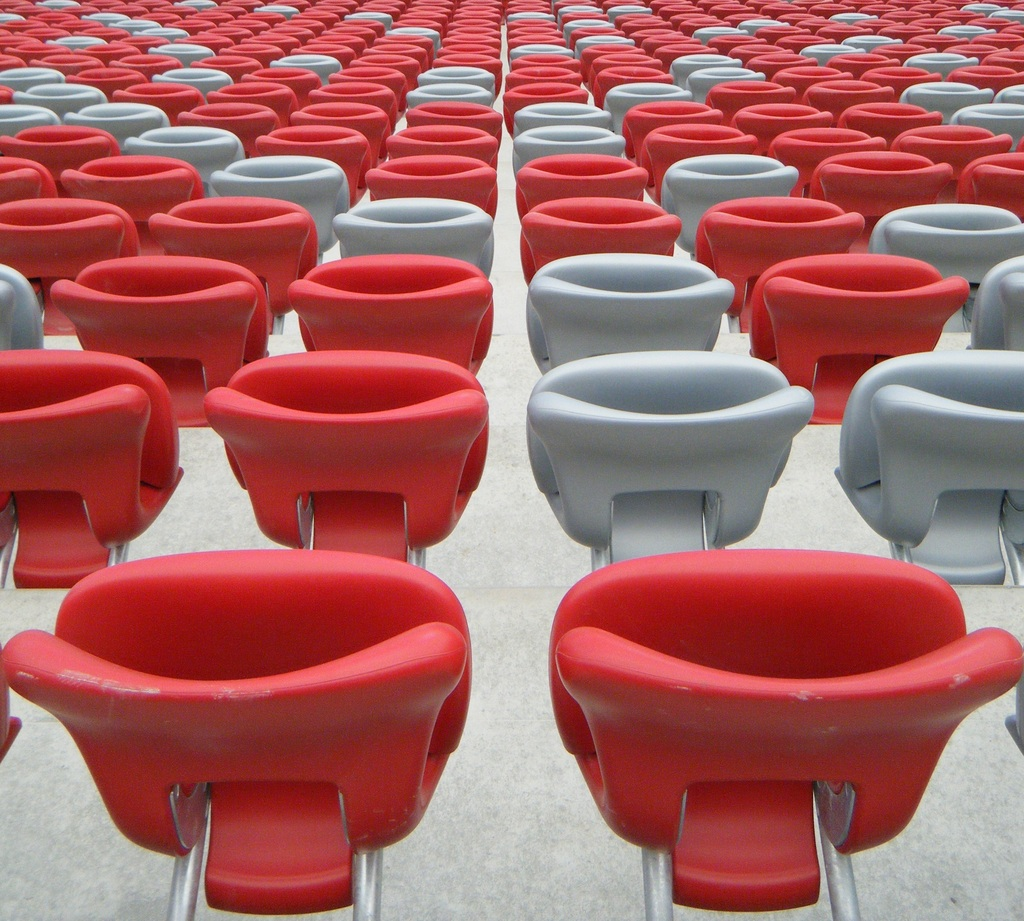
Standard folding stadium seats (FCB in red and silver colors) in the National Stadium, Warsaw

Folding seats are typically found in stadiums, arenas, theaters, lecture halls and auditoriums to facilitate entry and exit. Typically stadiums will utilise the folding seat feature to ensure they are compliant with allowing for egress of crowds for an emergency exit, or to allow movement of peoples. In the UK, folding or tip up seats ensure that a ground is Green Guide Compliant.

Some folding seats in rapid transit may fold-down rather than fold up.

In passenger aircraft, folding seats called jump seat, are used for cabin crew during start and landing.

== Gallery ==
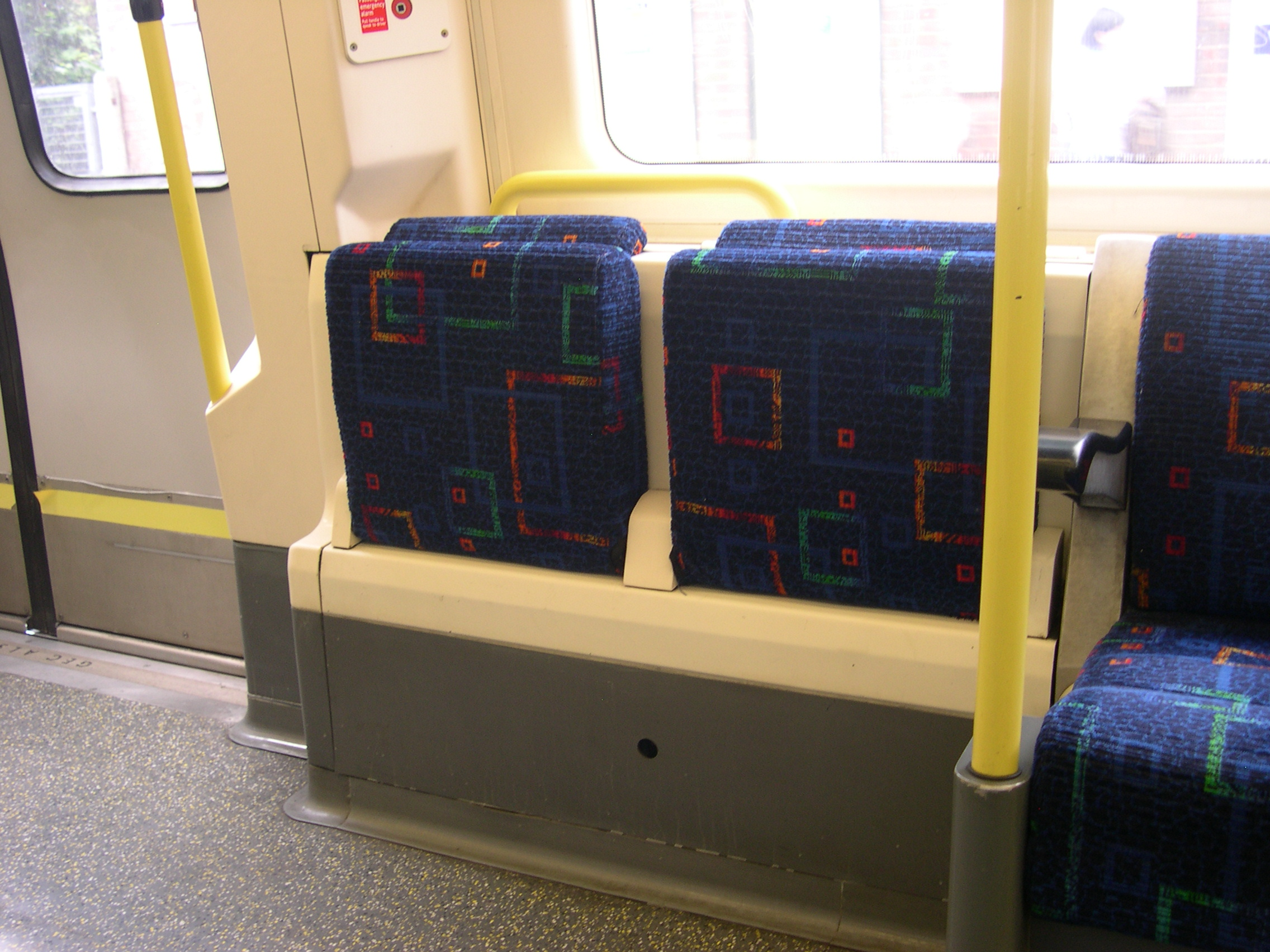
Folding seats on the London Underground 1995 Stock

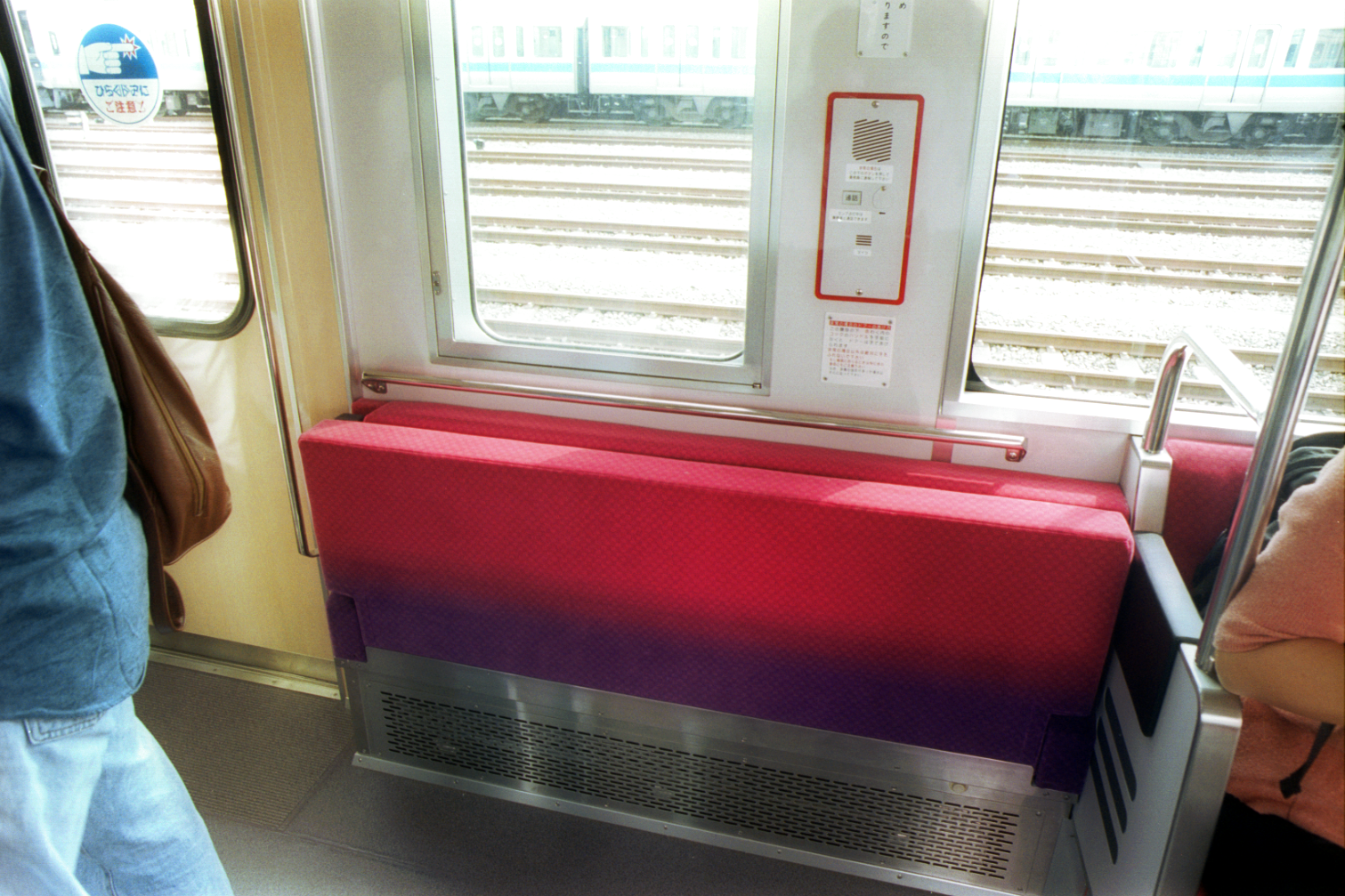
Folding seat (foldaway bench) in a passenger car of the Odakyu 3000 series

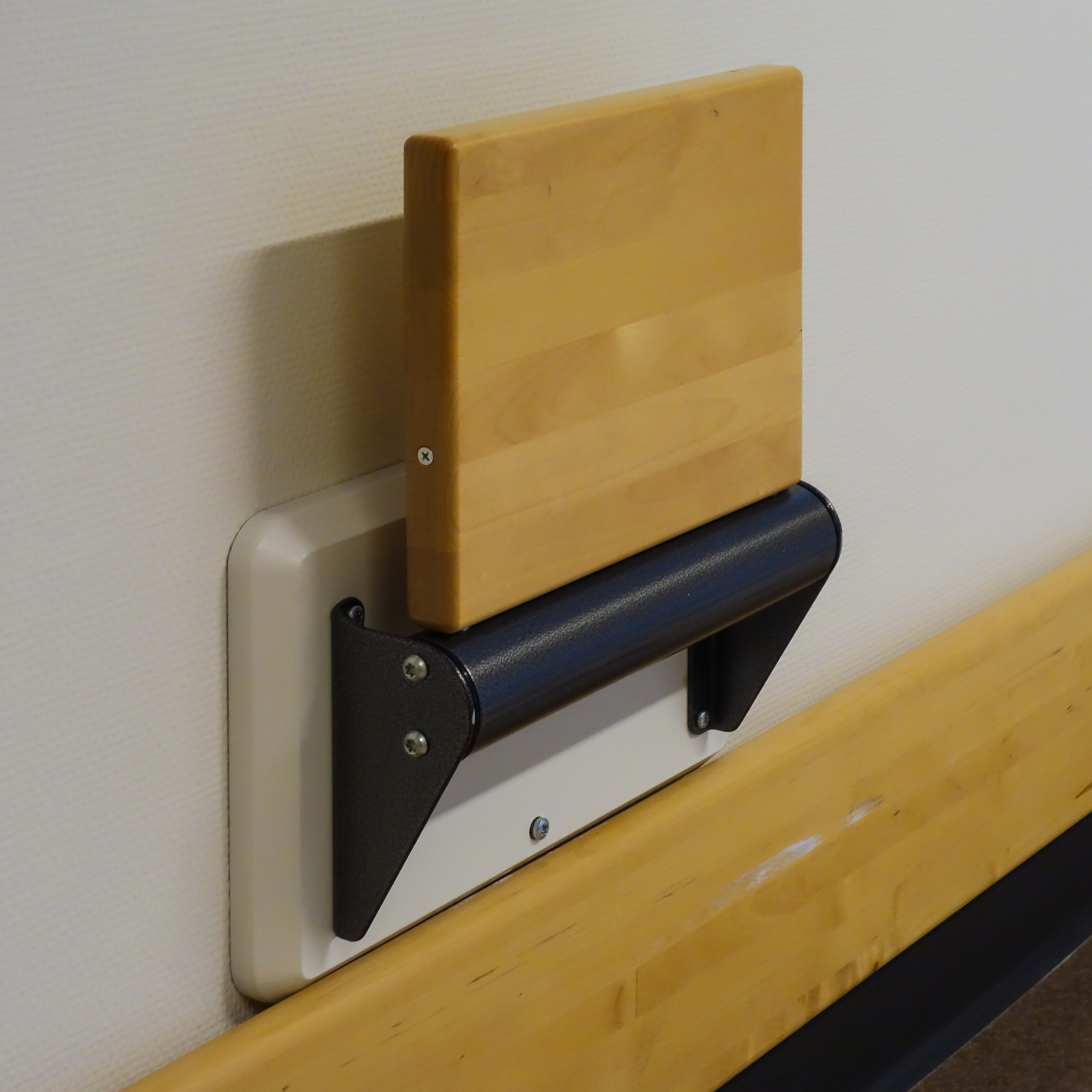
Folding seat in a corridor in NÄL hospital, Sweden

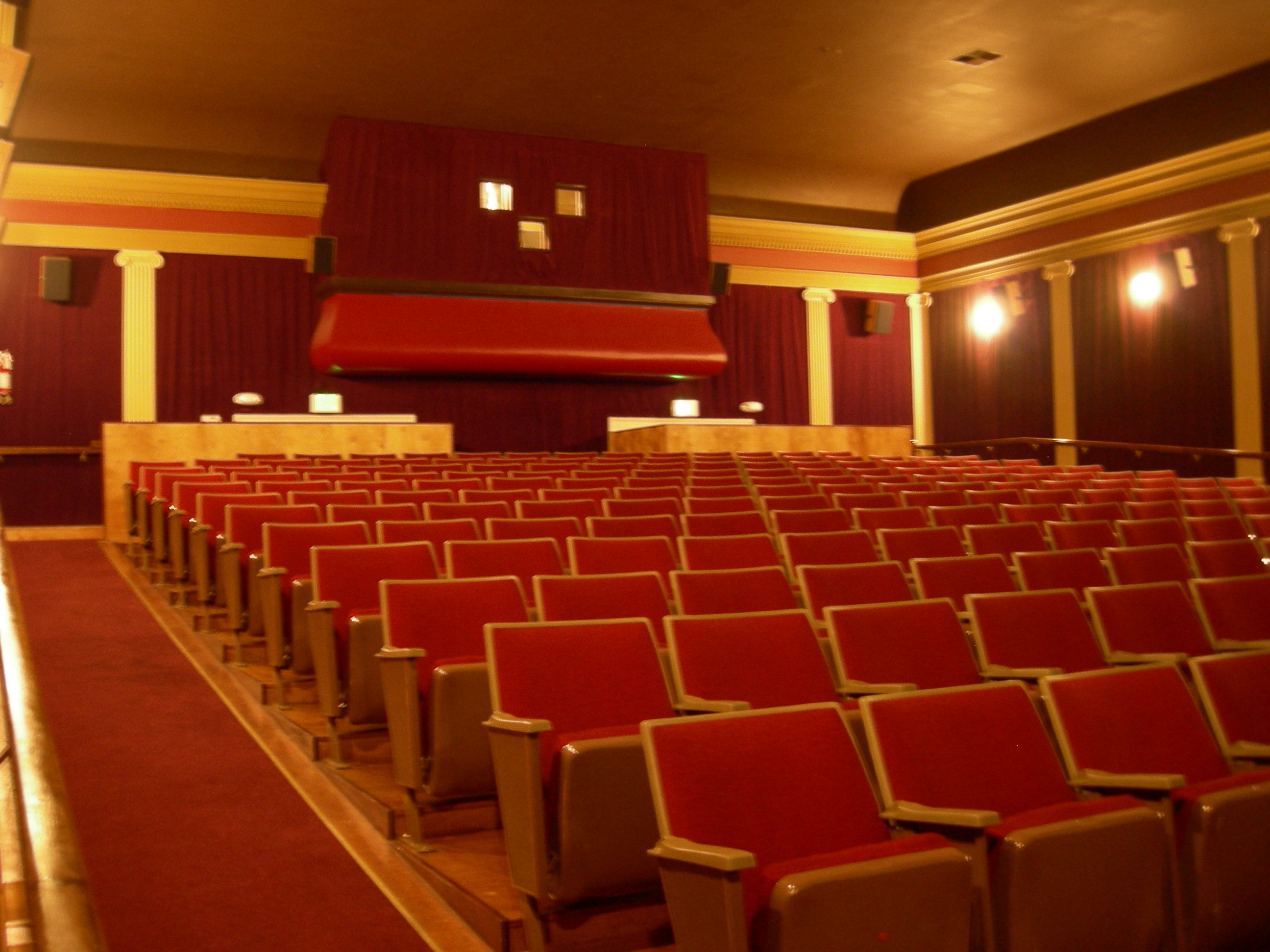
Main auditorium, Columbia City Cinema, Seattle, US

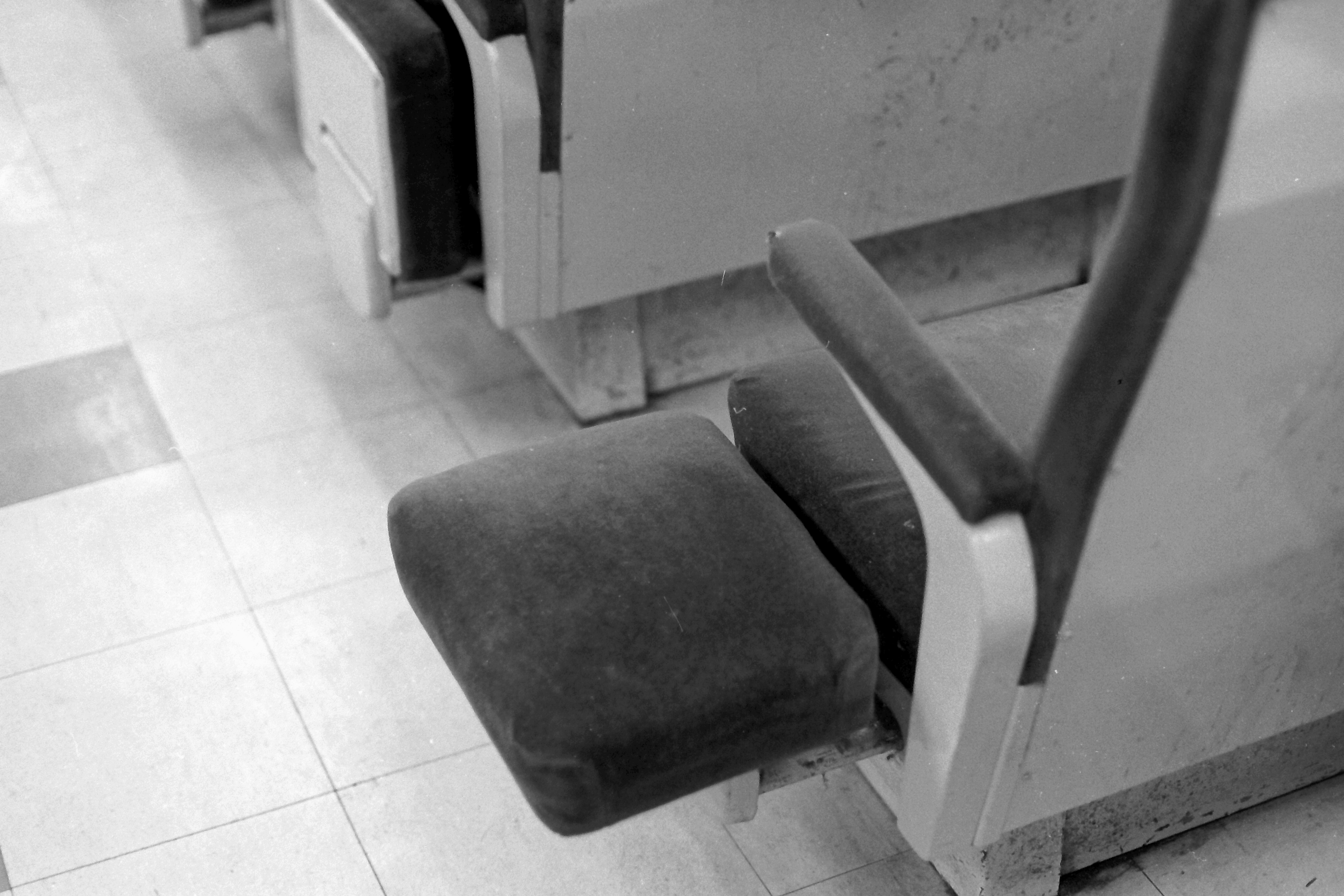
Folding seat on Awa Maru ordinary cabin

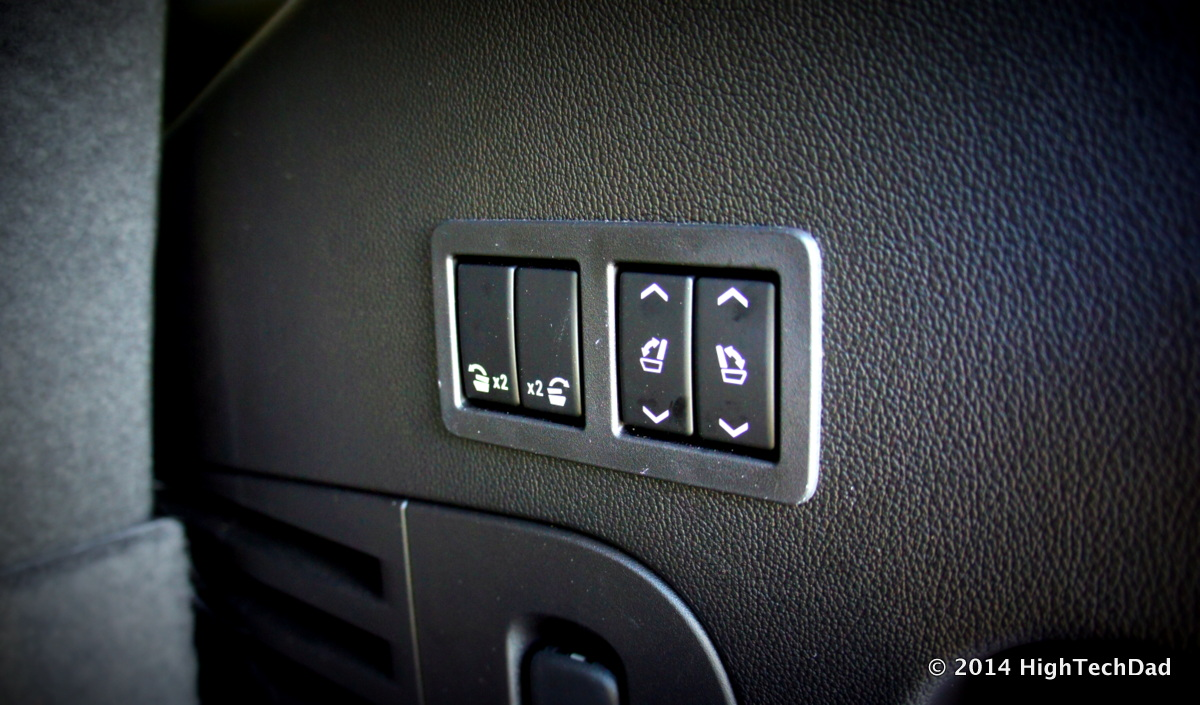
Folding seat controls

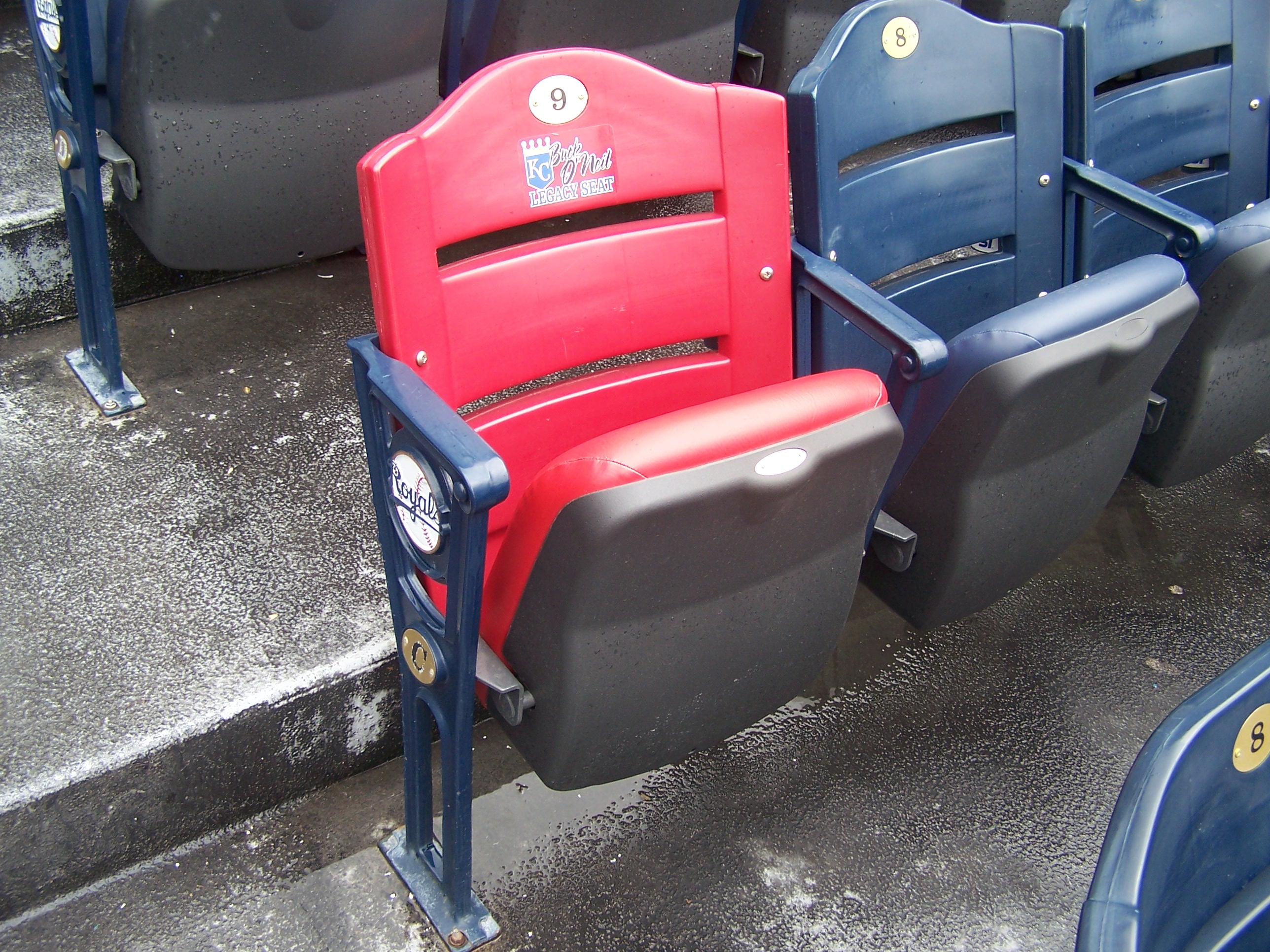
Folding seats in the Kauffman Stadium

== See also ==
- Fold down seating
- Folding chair
- Folding seats in cars
- Jump seat
- List of chairs
- Rumble seat
- Seat
- Stairlift
- Swivel seat
- Turning seat
