= Sightline (architecture) =

Unobstructed line between an observer and a subject of interest in a building

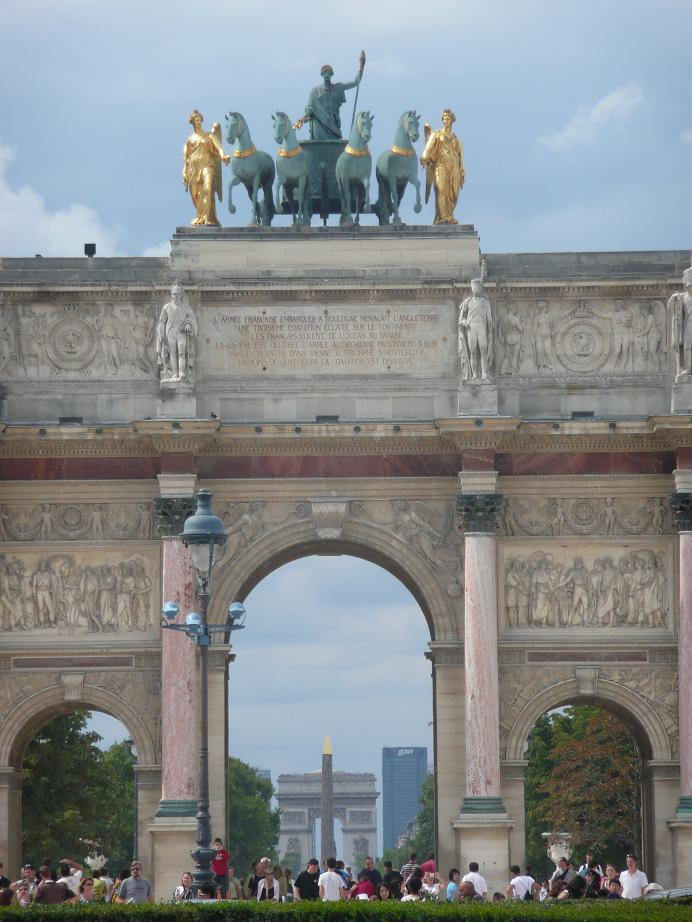
The Paris axe historique: the Arc de Triomphe du Carrousel, the obelisk of the Place de la Concorde, the Arc de Triomphe de l'Étoile, and the Grande Arche of La Défense are all on the same visual axis.

In architecture and urban planning, sightlines or vistas are a consideration in the design of civic structures, such as a stage, arena, or monument. They may determine the configuration of architectural elements in theater and stadium design and road junction layout.

Many cities such as London and Paris designate visual axes in the layout of streets and squares to allow for views of famous landmarks (terminating vistas).

Subjects that have a line of sight with one another are said to be intervisible, where intervisibility is the ability of viewers at separate places to see each other without any landform blocking their view.

== C-Value ==
Good sightlines allow spectators to see all areas of a venue stage or field of play. To ensure this designers utilize the C-value, defined as the vertical distance from a spectator's eyes to sightline of the spectator directly behind. The C-value is determined in part by the rake, that is, the upward slope of the seating.

The stadium bowl rake if based on consistent C-values will follow a parabolic curve in section. The curvature will be greatest closest to the pitch and will become an increasingly flatter curve as it moves to the upper rows. As a general rule the rake or curve of the seating bowl will flatten as the first row of seats move away from the side-line for a constant C-value. It is impractical to make different step heights for every single row. In practice the riser height is the same for a set of 4 or 5 rows at the bottom of the bowl with the number of rows in each same height set increasing for higher up rows. The uppermost tier could have only 2 or even 1 different step heights.

It is the lowest rows of seats that are the most sensitive to the impact of the C-value because of the very flat view angle to the touch line. The higher seats can have a reduced C-value without impacting as seriously on the clear view of the field of play.

=== Green Guide Sightline Formula ===
The existing sightline formula in the Green Guide (Guide to Safety at Sports Grounds) can be traced back to the sightline section of the Guide to Safety at Sports Grounds, also known as Green Guide. It is United Kingdom Government-funded guidance book on spectator safety at sports grounds. On Page 109 Green Guide Fifth Edition, the graphic reference does show the C-Value location.

== Sightlines in theatres ==
Plans of a Movie theater with sightlines

Sightline criteria in theaters can include: the "isacoustic curve" defined by John Scott Russell in 1838 and applied at the Auditorium Building in Chicago and the Emery Theatre in Cincinnati; alternate row sightlines where each patron sees between the heads of patrons in the row in front and over the heads of patrons in the second row in front; next row sightlines where each patron sees over the heads of patrons in the row immediately in front; and basic considerations like pointing the chairs more or less toward the performance, being able to see the conductor in the pit, being able to see other patrons, being able to see actors on elevated scenery, and not being obstructed by a wall, railing, column, ceiling overhang, loudspeaker cluster, or any other obstruction. The design of sightlines includes considerations of how much of the stage and scenery each patron can see. For example, can each patron see the top of the scenery or not, and can each patron see the whole stage floor or not? Design of sightlines is divided into two related exercises, vertical sightlines and horizontal sightlines. Design of proper sightlines includes resolving both technical and aesthetic issues. At issue is the emotional response of the audience: whether a performer can hold the audience's attention or not; whether the patron feels they had a "good" seat and their ticket was fairly priced or not; whether the audience gets the emotional impact of the performance or not; and whether the patron wants to come back and see another performance in that theater or not. Building codes restrict the maximum and minimum rise per row, limit the minimum width per row, limit the maximum deviation in the size of steps from row to row to achieve the curvature of the rake, and limit other aspects of sightline design.

Books on theater planning that discuss the design of sightlines.

It is recommended that a spectator's eye height must not be lower than 800 mm above the stage. However, in larger theatres it is acceptable to locate the eye height of the first row on the level of the stage.

== Sightlines in stadiums ==
The spectator view in modern stadia is optimised very carefully to balance the uninterrupted clear view to the field for every seat whilst not making the seating terraces any higher than necessary to satisfy structure, cost and safety considerations.

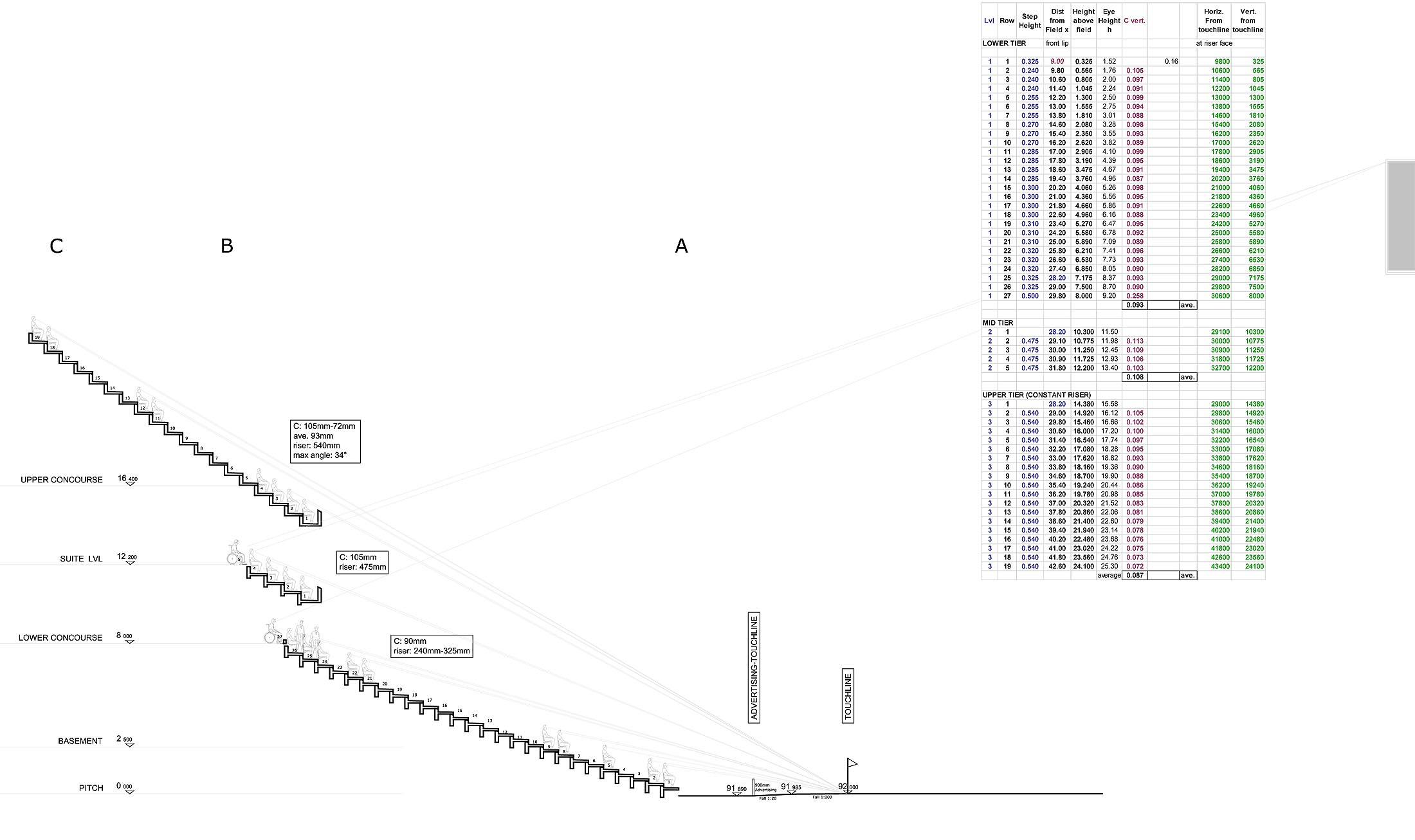
Typical Architectural Section of a stadium.

This is done with careful modelling utilizing the C-Value to ensure the ideal rake or curvature of the seating bowl. C-values are improved with a steeper slope or moving the seating rows away from the focus point. Inadequate views result in spectators jumping up for a better view during exciting play. This is an annoyance to others and can lead to fights and in the context of large crowds this can be a serious safety threat. The maximum step height between terraces or rows is usually limited to 540mm. If this is exceeded then a continuous guardrail is required as protection against falling. Even with a 540mm terrace step many spectators become uncomfortable and start to feel the impact of vertigo. An ideal maximum terrace step height that will avoid most people feeling insecure is 450mm.

=== Sightlines in plan ===
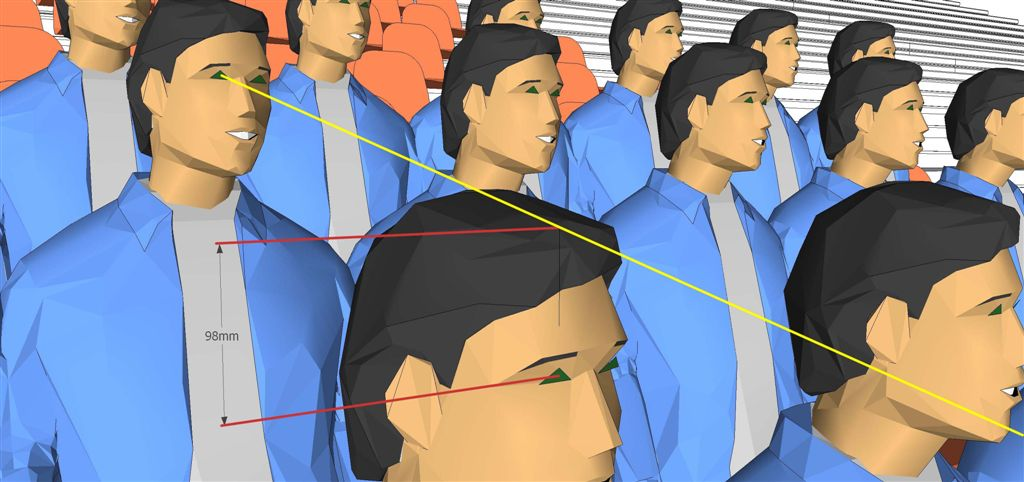
The C-value is the vertical distance from the spectator eye to where it intersects the sightline of the spectator directly behind.

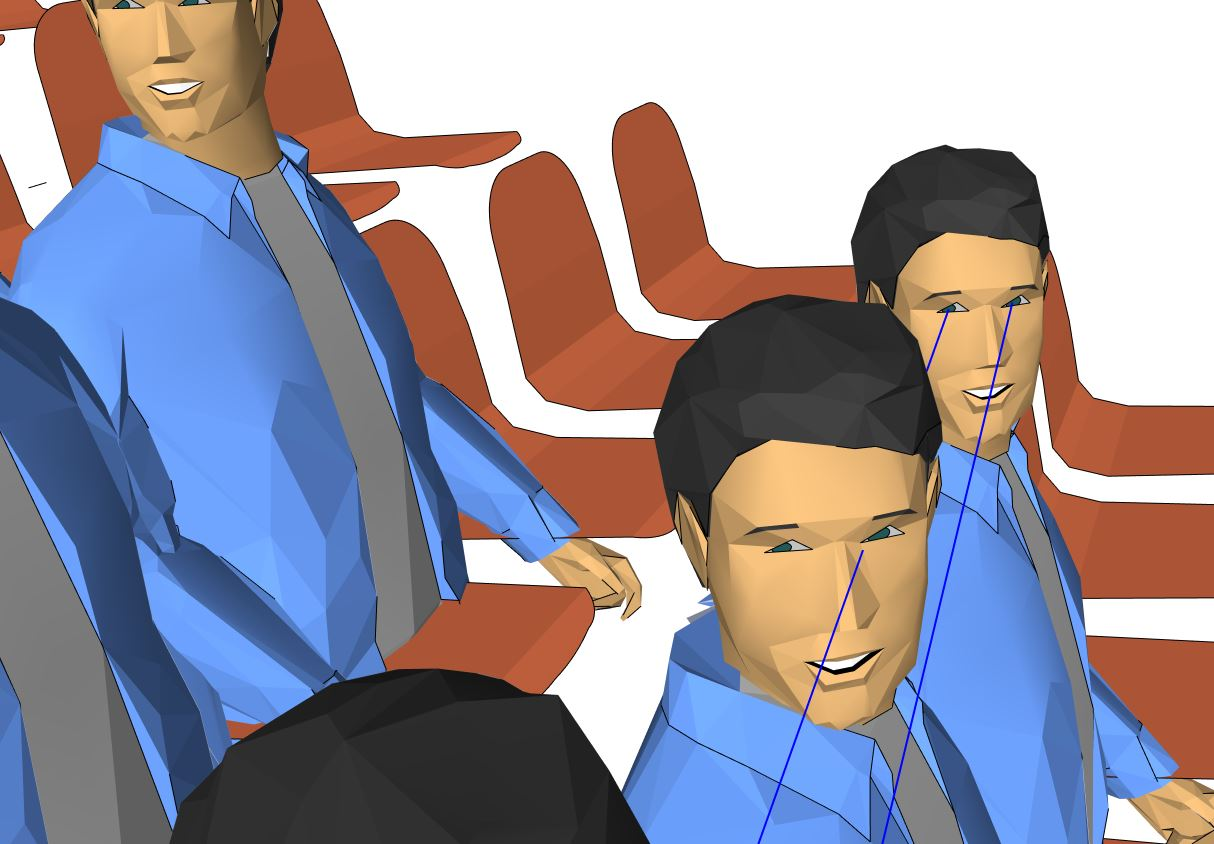
The illustration indicates the partially obstructed view of the front row spectators looking at the far corner flag of the adjacent touchline. One eye can see the action on the field whilst vision to the second eye is blocked.

The C-Value considers the sightlines in the vertical plane. The sightlines in the horizontal plane need to be considered for the front row spectators in the instance where they look acutely sideways, typically adjacent far end corner flag. At the extreme end of the front row, spectators could have their view from one of their eyes blocked by the head of the adjacent spectator. During exciting play this can lead to spectators jumping up out of their seats to get a better view. A clear view for both eyes for all front row spectators can be achieved by the use of curved stands in plan. It can also be argued that with play that is already a long distance away a better view of the game is available on the big video screen.

=== Focus point ===
The touch-line (or side-line) and the goal-line are considered the C-Value focus point in stadiums.

=== Obstructed view seats ===
There should be a clear view of the playing field from all seats. Roof supports should be eliminated entirely from the seating area. In calculating the sight lines it should be appreciated that advertising boards of 90–100 cm in height may be erected around the field at a distance of five metres from the touch lines and five metres behind the centre of the goal lines. FIFA ticketing carry out an assessment of all seats and those seats that have an obstructed view of the game will be classed obstructed view seats and will not be sold. Quite often these are the first few seats adjacent to the pitch with their view partially blocked by the advertising hoardings. This is an especially big problem with football stadiums that have running tracks around them. These seats are either covered with a fabric and not occupied during the game or the tickets are issued to non-paying spectators.

=== FIFA C-Value standards ===
- 6 cm absolute minimum
- 9 cm recommended minimum
- 12 cm optimum

== Research ==
The audience's sightline is an important aspect of the design of viewing venues. For theaters, an algorithm is used to check the sightline from a seat to determine if it is blocked. The development of better methods is the subject of continuing research. In 2011, Yeonhee Kim and Ghang Lee presented an algorithm to derive actual sight area in the early design stage of theater without producing a 3D model. The algorithm uses plan and cross sectional drawings to analyze view of audiences to resolve to address errors of the "sight area rate" algorithm which does not account for sightlines being blocked by the front-row seats in a theater.
