= Played in Britain =

English Heritage research project

- Type: Book publisher and Research project
- Industry: Publishing
- Founded: London, United Kingdom (2002)
- Headquarters: London, United Kingdom
- Key people: Simon Inglis, Series Editor

Played in Britain is a ten-year research project for English Heritage which seeks to record and celebrate Britain's sporting and recreational heritage, coinciding with the period from the staging of the 2002 Commonwealth Games in Manchester to the 2012 Olympics. Much of the research has been made publicly available in a series of books, also called Played in Britain, featuring historic buildings (such as grandstands, pavilions, swimming pools and billiard halls) and sportscapes (such as golf courses, racecourses, rivers and lakes). The series also looks at sporting artefacts and archaeology.

The Played in Britain research project is led by author and architectural historian Simon Inglis, best known for his books on football grounds, stadiums and football history. Simon Inglis is also the series editor of the Played in Britain books.

== Background ==
The Played in Britain series was launched in 2004, following a pilot study conducted in Manchester in 2002 as part of English Heritage’s contribution to the cultural programme of the 2002 Commonwealth Games. It frequently cites as its inspiration the words of Joseph Strutt, author of the seminal book The Sports and Pastimes of the People of England, first published in 1801. Strutt wrote, “In order to form a just estimation of the character of any particular people, it is absolutely necessary to investigate the sports and pastimes most generally prevalent among them.”

Sporting heritage in Britain is expected to gain increased attention as the 2012 Olympics approach, but such attention is often dismissed as tokenism. For example, as government and lottery money was lavished on a new swimming pool in Manchester for the 2002 Commonwealth Games, a few hundred yards away one of the most important historic swimming pools in Europe, the Victoria Baths (built 1903-06) lay empty and abandoned by its owners, Manchester City Council. Some of the other threatened Victorian and Edwardian baths around Britain are in Birmingham, Nottingham, Glasgow and most recently, Ripon. More historic sports venues in London are expected to suffer as funds are increasingly diverted towards projects for the 2012 Olympics.

== Research so far ==
Played in Britain has published studies of the sporting heritage of Manchester, Birmingham, Liverpool, Tyne and Wear, Glasgow (for Historic Scotland) and London.

The series has also featured seven thematic studies:

Uppies and Downies by Hugh Hornby, on the so-called 'extraordinary football games of Britain' such as the Royal Shrovetide Football match at Ashbourne, the Kirkwall Ba Game at Christmas and New Year and the annual Haxey Hood game in Lincolnshire. Hornby is a former curator at the National Football Museum in Preston.

Liquid Assets by Janet Smith, is a study of the lidos and open air swimming pools of Britain, of which there are approximately 100 left, down from a peak of around 300 in the early 1950s. The book’s foreword was written by artist Tracey Emin, herself a great fan of outdoor swimming from her youth in Margate.

Engineering Archie by Simon Inglis, looks at the life and work of the Scottish football ground engineer Archibald Leitch.

Great Lengths by Dr Ian Gordon and Simon Inglis, features detailed studies of 54 of Britain's historic indoor swimming pools and includes a comprehensive directory of extant baths-related buildings from 1800-1970. The foreword to Great Lengths is written by double Olympic gold medallist, Rebecca Adlington.

Played at the Pub by Arthur Taylor describes the wide range of pub games to be found in Britain, from darts to dwile flonking, and features long lost games such as knur and spell and nipsy.

The British Olympics, Britain's Olympic heritage 1612-2012 by Martin Polley, who details Britain's surprisingly long association with the Olympics.

Bowled Over, the bowling greens of Britain, by Hugh Hornby, on the rich history and heritage of bowling and the associated greens and pavilions of Britain.

The series has been regularly reviewed in the national press and media, but received its most surprising boost from the TV programme Richard & Judy, which featured a pocket book in the series, called A Load of Old Balls. Although apparently a flippant title, the book is actually about the design and manufacture of balls in sport, and the decline of the British ball manufacturing industry.

Another strand in the series is devoted to reproducing the archives of Charles Buchan’s Football Monthly, a magazine founded by Charles Buchan and first published in 1951. Five books from the archive have been published so far - The Best of Charles Buchan's Football Monthly, Charles Buchan's Arsenal Gift Book, Charles Buchan's Manchester United Gift Book, Charles Buchan's Spurs Gift Book and Charles Buchan's Liverpool Gift Book.

== Bibliography ==
- Played in Manchester by Simon Inglis ISBN 1-873592-78-7
- Played in Birmingham by Steve Beauchampe and Simon Inglis ISBN 0-9547445-1-9
- Played in Liverpool by Ray Physick ISBN 978-1-85074-990-5
- Played in Tyne and Wear by Lynn Pearson ISBN 978-1-905624-74-4
- Played in Glasgow by Ged O'Brien ISBN 978-0-9547445-5-7
- Played in London by Simon Inglis ISBN 978-1-84802-057-3
- A Load of Old Balls by Simon Inglis ISBN 0-9547445-2-7
- Uppies and Downies by Hugh Hornby ISBN 978-1-905624-64-5
- Liquid Assets by Janet Smith ISBN 978-0-9547445-0-2
- Engineering Archie by Simon Inglis ISBN 978-1-85074-918-9
- Great Lengths by Dr Ian Gordon and Simon Inglis ISBN 978-1-905624-52-2
- Played at the Pub by Arthur Taylor ISBN 978-1-905624-97-3
- The British Olympics by Martin Polley ISBN 978-1-84802-058-0
- Bowled Over by Hugh Hornby ISBN 978-1-905624-980
- The Best of Charles Buchan’s Football Monthly ISBN 978-1-905624-04-1
- Charles Buchan’s Manchester United Gift Book ISBN 978-0-9547445-4-0
- Charles Buchan’s Arsenal Gift Book ISBN 978-0-9547445-3-3
- Charles Buchan's Spurs Gift Book ISBN 978-0-9547445-7-1
- Charles Buchan's Liverpool Gift Book ISBN 978-0-9547445-6-4
