= Sports Grounds Safety Authority =

British Non-Departmental Government Body

Sports Grounds Safety Authority

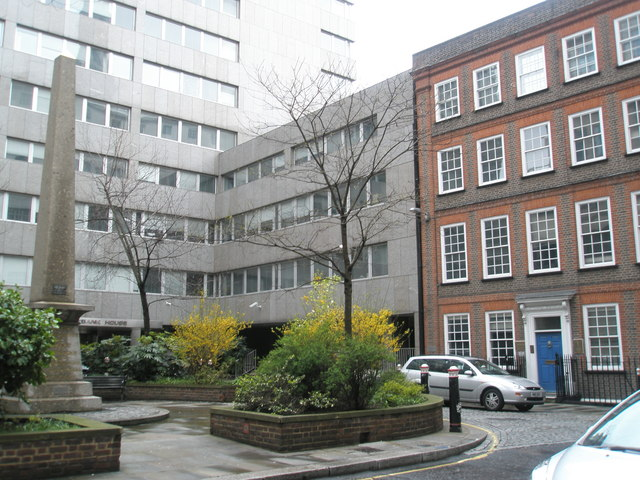
Sports Grounds Safety Authority headquarters.

The Sports Grounds Safety Authority (SGSA) is a non-departmental public body in the United Kingdom funded by the Department for Culture, Media and Sport (DCMS).

Until 2011 it was known as the Football Licensing Authority, having been set up under the Football Spectators Act 1989, but it was renamed by the Sports Grounds Safety Authority Act 2011 which expanded its remit to all sports grounds.

The aim of the SGSA is to ensure that all spectators regardless of age, gender, ethnic origin, disability, or the team that they support are able to attend sports grounds in safety, comfort and security.

== Creation ==
The Football Licensing Authority was originally conceived as the body that would implement the Football Membership Scheme in response to the disaster at the Heysel Stadium in 1985. However, the Government shelved this in the light of Lord Justice Taylor's Final Report on the Hillsborough disaster of April 1989.

Instead it was eventually charged with implementing some of the report's key recommendations under the Football Spectators Act 1989 by:

- monitoring local authorities' oversight of spectator safety at international, Premiership and Football League grounds
- and ensuring through a system of licensing that these grounds became all seated.

In 1992 the Government of the United Kingdom decided to allow clubs in the Football League Second and Third Divisions to retain some standing accommodation, provided that this satisfied certain criteria. The FLA enforced this through their licensing scheme.

== Key objectives ==
The FLA had agreed the following key objectives with the United Kingdom Government:

- To ensure by means of guidance, assistance and monitoring that the local authorities perform their functions to a consistent and acceptable standard; and, in the long term, to give these authorities the opportunity to reduce their level of involvement as clubs take greater responsibility for safety.
- To maintain and build on the achievements of the government's policies on spectator accommodation.
- To bring about, through advice and persuasion, a permanent change of culture whereby consistently high standards of safety are maintained at every Premiership, Football League and international football ground by the clubs or ground management taking responsibility on their own initiative rather than in response to requirements imposed by other bodies.
- To maintain and enhance its position as the leading authority on ground safety and standards both at home and overseas and as the prime source of advice and assistance to the government, local authorities, clubs and other bodies.

== Wider role ==
In December 1998, following a major review, the Government of the United kingdom announced that the FLA would in due course become the Sports Grounds Safety Authority. It presented legislation to this effect to Parliament but the 2001 General Election intervened. Ministers were committed to reintroducing it when they could find a place in the Parliamentary timetable, but failed to do so.

Although the formal role of the FLA was limited to professional football grounds, they did respond to requests for general advice and information in relation to other sporting venues – where the issues and needs are often the same.

== Change from Football Licensing Authority to Sports Grounds Safety Authority ==
On 14 October 2010 it was announced that the FLA was one of the 192 Quangos to be axed by Her Majesty's Government, with its expertise and functions transferred to another body. On 12 July 2011 the Sports Grounds Safety Authority Act 2011 received royal assent. The act transformed the Football Licensing Authority into the Sports Grounds Safety Authority. On 10 November 2014 it was announced that the Sports Grounds Safety Authority will be retained as an Independent body.

== See also ==
- Hillsborough disaster
- Taylor Report
- Green Guide
- Terrace (stadium)
- All-seater stadium
- Premier League
