= All-seater stadium =

Sports stadium where all spectators are seated

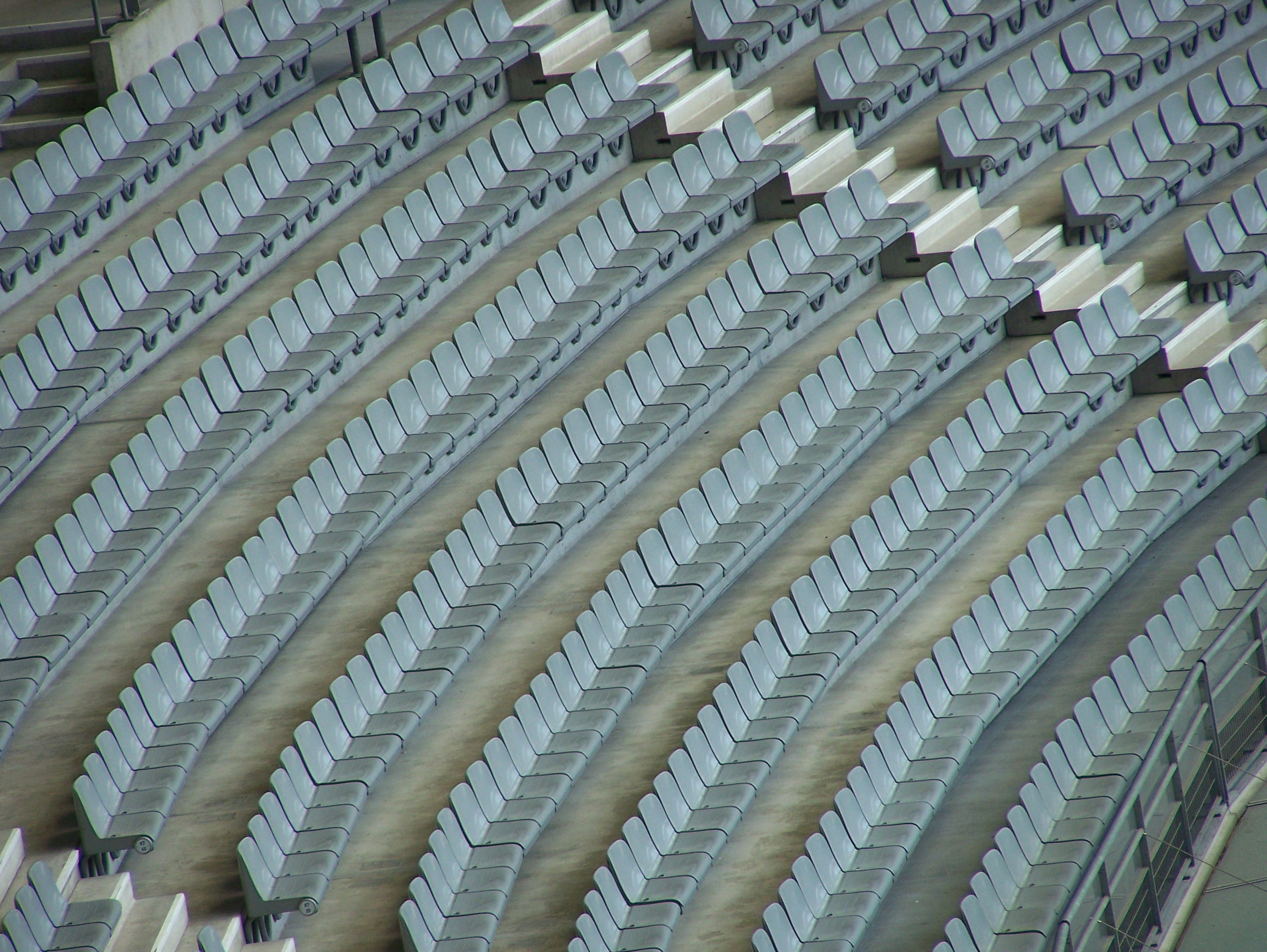
Seats in the Stade de France

An all-seater stadium is a sports stadium in which every spectator has a seat. This is commonplace in professional association football stadiums in nations such as the United Kingdom, Spain, and the Netherlands. Typically - a folding seat is used to maintain Green Guide compliance to ensure grounds are safe for spectators. Most association football, American football, and Canadian football stadiums in the United States and Canadian Football League stadiums in Canada are all-seaters, as are most baseball and track and field stadiums in those countries. A stadium that is not an all-seater has areas for attendees holding standing-room only tickets to stand and view the proceedings. Such standing areas are known as terraces in Britain. Stands with only terraces used to dominate the football attendance in the UK. For instance, the South Bank Stand behind the southern goal at Molineux Stadium, home of Wolverhampton Wanderers, had a maximum of 32,000 standing attenders, while the rest of the stadium hosted a little bit less than that; the total maximum attendance was around 59,000.

Some European countries do not have all-seater stadiums. In Germany, standing places are cheaper than seats and the Ultra fans require terraced areas for their choreography. For instance, Borussia Dortmund's Westfalenstadion (commercially known as Signal Iduna Park) has an all-seated capacity of 65,829; during Bundesliga games, the attendance limit is set to 81,360. If the generally accepted guideline of "two standing occupies the same space as one sitting" can be said to be accurate, then around 15,000 seats are replaced by 30,000 standing attenders at Bundesliga games.

== In the United Kingdom ==
Meadowbank Stadium, the home of Meadowbank Thistle from 1974 until 1995, was the first all-seated football ground in the United Kingdom.

Aberdeen reconstructed Pittodrie in 1978, putting benches on the open south terrace as the final part of a longer-term plan to make the ground all-seated. Subsequent to this, the south side of the ground was covered over, and Pittodrie Stadium was proclaimed as the country's first all-seated, all-covered ground, although the southern corners of the ground remained open to the skies. In 1981, Coventry City converted Highfield Road to all-seating, the first club in England to do so, at the instigation of the then chairman, Jimmy Hill. This move, forced on the fans, proved unpopular, with attendances declining, and terracing was reinstated at one end by 1985.

In 1986, Luton Town converted their Kenilworth Road stadium to all-seater status as one of the consequences of the Luton Town vs Millwall hooligan riot during their FA Cup sixth round match on 13 March 1985.

The first English professional football club to convert to all-seats following the watershed of the 1989 Hillsborough stadium disaster was Ipswich Town's Portman Road in 1992.

The other ground often cited as all-seated in Britain before 1990 was Ibrox, home of Rangers. However, although Ibrox had no terracing after the redevelopment which was completed in 1981, there was still a significant standing area in the 'Enclosure', the front portion of the old Main Stand.

St Johnstone opened the first purpose-built all-seater football stadium in the United Kingdom weeks after the Hillsborough disaster, with the opening of McDiarmid Park in August 1989.

All-seater stadiums have been compulsory in the English Premiership since the start of the 1994–95 season as a result of the Taylor Report (also known as the Hillsborough Stadium Disaster Inquiry report), which gave recommendations to improve stadium safety after the Hillsborough disaster. The initial plan, drawn up in 1990, had recommended that standing areas should be banned from stadiums in the upper two tiers of the league from 1994 onwards, while stadiums in the lower two tiers had until 1999 to meet these requirements. A review of the proposals in 1992 saw non-Premiership and second tier clubs retain the option to have standing areas. From time to time there are calls for Premiership stadiums to be allowed to have standing areas, but these have always been rejected.

The compulsory introduction of all-seated stadiums in the upper reaches of English football saw the demolition of several famous terraced standing areas which had been iconic throughout the game and famous all over the world. The first such notable casualties were Manchester United's Stretford End and Arsenal's North Bank, both of which were demolished in 1992 to be replaced by new all-seated stands. Two years later, Liverpool demolished their iconic Spion Kop and replaced it with an all-seater stand, while a similar redevelopment occurred with Aston Villa's Holte End.

== Worldwide ==
FIFA, UEFA, and CONCACAF also mandate that all matches in competitions that they control be held in all-seater stadiums. This means that in countries where standing terraces are commonplace, either the stadiums cannot be used at all, or the standing areas must be closed to spectators. Either temporary seats have to be installed (as is the case with Croke Park, home to the Republic of Ireland national team during the Lansdowne Road redevelopment), or the standing areas must be converted to seating (as is the case with several of the larger stadiums in Germany, many of which were used in an all-seater configuration for the 2006 FIFA World Cup). Many cricket stadiums in South Africa, New Zealand and Australia are not all-seaters; many areas of the ground provide grass banks offering cheaper entry, which means that spectators can sit on the grass. Examples of this include Adelaide Oval, the WACA Ground in Perth and the Basin Reserve in Wellington.

North American stadiums rarely have standing-room terraces; rather, many stadiums have bleacher seating, which are tiered seating areas using flat benches and are usually uncovered. In most large facilities, bleachers are in a relatively small section far from the playing field, and are often referred to as the "cheap seats". One example of this is in Coors Field, home of the Colorado Rockies baseball team. Coors Field features a bleacher area in high center-field known as the "Rock Pile". Because standing-room terraces are so uncommon, the term "all-seater" is not generally used. One of the first all-seater stadiums in college football was L&N Stadium of the Louisville Cardinals.

A trend that has emerged, particularly in Europe, is to have convertible seats in parts of the stadium. This means that certain sections can easily be converted between seating and standing capacity, allowing for standing spectators in domestic games while also meeting the requirements for seating-only capacity during European fixtures, as well as other fixtures that require seating-only capacity.

When standing-room areas do exist, they are generally not sold separately from seats, but rather are provided for spectators who wish to view a portion of the game from a different angle (such as the bullpen area and centerfield terrace at Seattle's T-Mobile Park), or are admission-free (such as an area at San Francisco's Oracle Park, where the game is visible from a public waterfront walk, through a series of fenced archways which form a part of the outfield wall). Notable exceptions to this are the NFL Washington Commanders' FedExField, which contains a terrace-style standing room only section in the higher areas above each end zone, and the Dallas Cowboys, who sell standing-room tickets for 4 large endzone terraces and smaller terraces located in the corners of AT&T Stadium. Highmark Stadium, home of the Buffalo Bills, includes a 5,000-person standing room terrace to compensate for the fact that the stadium has the smallest capacity amongst NFL stadiums. The Boston Red Sox baseball team offers standing room tickets when a game is sold out. The Detroit Red Wings and Detroit Tigers both offer standing room only seating. There are no major standing room terraces; rather, people stand along the edges of the concourses directly at the back of the seating areas.

== See also ==
- Seating capacity
- Safe standing
- UEFA stadium categories
- Folding Seats (tip up seats)
