= Green Guide =

Guide to safety at sports grounds

Guide to Safety at Sports Grounds
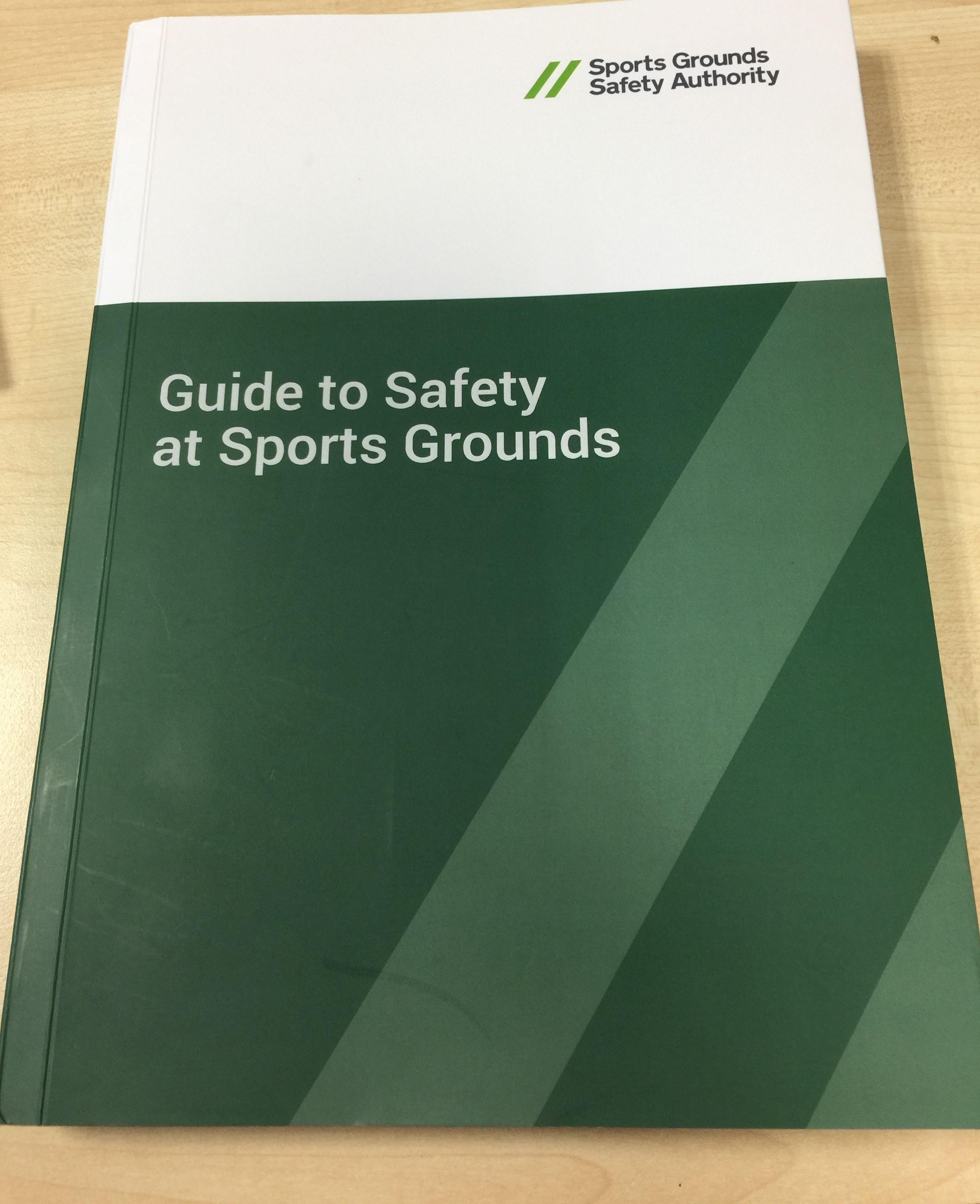
- Sixth edition of book
- Language: English
- Published: 1973–2018 (Sports Grounds Safety Authority)
- Publication place: United Kingdom
- ISBN: 978-1-9164583-0-7

The Guide to Safety at Sports Grounds, colloquially known as the Green Guide is a UK Government-funded guidance book on spectator safety at sports grounds. The Guide provides detailed guidance to ground management, technical specialists such as architects and engineers and all relevant authorities to assist them assess how many spectators can be safely accommodated within a sports ground.

It has no statutory force but many of its recommendations will be given force of law at individual grounds by their inclusion in General Safety Certificates issued under the Safety of Sports Grounds Act 1975 or the Fire Safety and Safety of Places of Sports Act 1987.

It is written by the Sports Grounds Safety Authority (formally the Football Licensing Authority).

== Background ==
Following the Ibrox disaster in 1971 when 66 people were killed, the government commissioned a report by Lord Wheatley the following year. In his report Lord Wheatley said:

While not seeking to set out a code of practice in the sense of statutory regulations which have to be observed in all cases, I have, with the assistance of the Technical Support Group, provided what should be regarded as guidelines towards a proper standard. I trust that these will be of benefit both to clubs in deciding what they should do in making improvements, and to licensing authorities in deciding what should be looked for."

As a result of Lord Wheatley's report the first guide was published in 1973.

Following the Bradford City stadium fire in 1985 when 56 people were killed, Justice Popplewell was commissioned to produce a report into safety at sporting venues. The results of his report were incorporated into an expanded second edition of the Green Guide which was published in 1986.

Following the Hillsborough disaster in 1989, when 97 people were killed, Lord Justice Taylor in his report noted that "..evidence I have received suggesting that the Green Guide may not be followed as closely as is desirable, I consider that when it is revised it needs to be given more effect". This led to a third edition, published in 1990, which incorporated changes of the guidelines following a re-examination of the Hillsborough disaster.

The fourth edition was published in 1997 and was a major revision which contained several recommendations following consultations between statutory and regulatory authorities. This edition added substantially new guidance on providing access and hosting spectators with disabilities.

The fifth and edition was published in 2008 and provided more advice to stadium authorities as to risk management, counter terrorism and guidance on training and qualifications of stewards.

The sixth editions was published in 2018. It provides new additions on Zone Ex, the areas outside the stadium where spectators arrive and depart, as well as changes and updates on the advances in technology.

== See also ==
- Sightline (architecture)
