= Taylor Report =

Report on the Hillsborough disaster

The Hillsborough Stadium Disaster Inquiry report is the report of an inquiry which was overseen by Lord Justice Taylor, into the causes of the Hillsborough disaster in Sheffield, South Yorkshire, England, on 15 April 1989, as a result of which, at the time of the report, 95 Liverpool fans had died (a 96th fan died in 1993, and 97th in 2021). An interim report was published in August 1989, and the final report was published in January 1990.

The Taylor Report found that the main reason for the disaster was the failure of police control. It recommended that all major stadiums convert to an all-seater model, and that all ticketed spectators should have seats, as opposed to some or all being obliged to stand. The Football League in England and the Scottish Football League introduced regulations that required clubs in the highest divisions (top two divisions in the English system) to comply with this recommendation by August 1994.

The report stated that standing accommodation was not intrinsically unsafe, but the government, nonetheless, decided that no standing accommodation should be allowed.

Other recommendations of the Taylor Report included points on items such as the sale of alcohol within stadiums, crush barriers, fences (as many Liverpool fans had been crushed to death against the perimeter fencing at Hillsborough), turnstiles, ticket prices and other stadium items.

== Inquiry ==
After the Hillsborough disaster, Lord Justice Taylor was appointed to conduct an inquiry into the events. The Taylor Inquiry sat for a total of 31 days and published two reports: an interim report which laid out the events of the day and immediate conclusions, and the final report which outlined general recommendations on football ground safety. This became known as the Taylor Report.

== Findings ==
Taylor concluded that "policing on 15 April broke down" and "although there were other causes, the main reason for the disaster was the failure of police control." Attention was focused on the decision to open the secondary gates; moreover, the kick-off should have been delayed, as had been done at other venues and matches.

Sheffield Wednesday were criticised for the inadequate number of turnstiles at the Leppings Lane end and the poor quality of the crush barriers on the terraces, "respects in which failure by the Club contributed to this disaster."

=== Police control ===
Taylor found there was "no provision" for controlling the entry of spectators into the turnstile area. Questioned why more action had not been taken to screen individuals and improve the flow of supporters approaching the stadium from the west "where the turnstile area was so small and awkwardly laid out", senior police officers responded that policy and practice had been no different from in the past, and they had no reason to anticipate problems as earlier events had proceeded without major incident. In fact, Taylor noted only two occasions when the entry at Leppings Lane had been the sole access to the north and west sides of the ground, at the 1987 and 1988 semi-finals, with evidence of congestion at both, but owing to good fortune and circumstance police policy "was not put to the same test and strain as a year later".

The senior police officers said it had never happened before so there was no reason to foresee it. In fact, the only two previous occasions when the Leppings Lane terraces had been used to fill the whole of the north and west sides of the ground were at the two semi-finals, in 1987 and 1988. In 1987, the match was on a Sunday scheduled for 12 noon, and kick-off was postponed for a quarter of an hour because of late arrivals.

The need to open gate C was due to dangerous congestion at the turnstiles. That occurred because, as both Club and police should have realised, the turnstile area could not easily cope with the large numbers demanded of it unless they arrived steadily over a lengthy period. The Operational Order and police tactics on the day failed to provide for controlling a concentrated arrival of large numbers should that occur in a short period. That it might so occur was foreseeable and it did.

As a result of the inadequate number of turnstiles, it has been calculated that it would have taken until 3:40 pm to get all ticket holders into the Leppings Lane end had an exit gate not been opened. Gate C was opened to let fans in, but the number of fans entering the terrace was not thought to have been more than the capacity of the entire standing area. Once inside the stadium, most fans entering the terraces headed for the central pens 3 and 4, as directed by a large sign above the access tunnel.

Since pens 3 and 4 were full by 2.50 pm, the tunnel should have been closed off whether gate C was to be opened or not. ... [I]t should have been clear in the control room where there was a view of the pens and of the crowd at the turnstiles that the tunnel had to be closed. If orders had been given to that effect when gate C was opened, the fans could have been directed to the empty areas of the wings and this disaster could still have been avoided. Failure to give that order was a blunder of the first magnitude.

Standard procedure for league fixtures was to estimate the size of the visiting fan base, determine how many enclosures need to be opened, then fill each standing area one at a time. For all-ticket games that had sold out, such as semi-final matches, a different approach was adopted whereby supporters were allowed to enter any enclosure they wished upon arrival. There was no mechanical or electronic means for calculating when individual enclosures had reached capacity. A police officer made a visual assessment before guiding fans to other pens.

Whilst in theory the police would intervene if a pen became "full", in practice they permitted the test of fullness to be what the fans would tolerate. By 2.52 pm when gate C was opened, pens 3 and 4 were over-full even by this test. Many were uncomfortable. To allow any more into those pens was likely to cause injuries; to allow in a large stream was courting disaster.

The official combined capacity of the central pens was 2,200, but the Health and Safety Executive found this should have been reduced to 1,693 as crush barriers and perimeter gates did not conform to the Green Guide. It is estimated that more than 3,000 people were in the pens shortly after kick off at 3:00 pm. Overcrowding caused the fatal crush.

When spectators first appeared on the track, the immediate assumption in the control room was that a pitch invasion was threatened. This was unlikely at the beginning of a match. It became still less likely when those on the track made no move towards the pitch. ... [T]here was no effective leadership either from control or on the pitch to harness and organise rescue efforts. No orders were given for officers to enter the tunnel and relieve pressure.

The anxiety to protect the sanctity of the pitch has caused insufficient attention to be paid to the risk of a crush due to overcrowding. Certain it was, that once the crush occurred on 15 April gates 3 and 4 were wholly inadequate for rescue purposes.

Lord Taylor regarded spectator allocation irrelevant to the disaster. "I do not consider choice of ends was causative of the disaster. Had it been reversed, the disaster could well have occurred in a similar manner but to Nottingham supporters."

=== Aggravating factors ===
There were accusations that the behaviour of Liverpool fans contributed to the disaster; these accusations centred around consumption of alcohol before the game and attempts to enter the ground without a ticket. Although Lord Taylor acknowledged that these factors aggravated the situation, he concluded that they were secondary issues. Witness estimates of the number of drunken fans varied from a minority to a large proportion of the crowd. Although it was clear many fans had been drinking, Lord Taylor unequivocally stated that most of them were: "not drunk, nor even the worse for drink." He concluded that they formed an exacerbating factor and that police, seeking to rationalise their loss of control, overestimated the element of drunkenness in the crowd.

The Hillsborough Independent Panel later noted that, despite being dismissed by the Taylor Report, the idea that alcohol contributed to the disaster proved remarkably durable. Documents later disclosed confirm that repeated attempts were made to find supporting evidence for alcohol being a factor and that available evidence was significantly misinterpreted. It noted, "The weight placed on alcohol in the face of objective evidence of a pattern of consumption modest for a leisure event was inappropriate. It has since fuelled persistent and unsustainable assertions about drunken fan behaviour."

The possibility of fans attempting to gain entry without tickets or with forged tickets was suggested as a contributing factor. South Yorkshire Police suggested the late arrival of fans amounted to a conspiracy to gain entry without tickets. However, analysis of the electronic monitoring system, Health and Safety Executive analysis, and eyewitness accounts showed that the total number of people who entered the Leppings Lane end was below the official capacity of the stand. Eyewitness reports suggested that tickets were available on the day, and tickets for the Leppings Lane end were on sale from Anfield until the day before. The report dismissed the theory.

=== Police evasion ===
Taylor concluded his criticism of South Yorkshire Police by describing senior officers in command as "defensive and evasive witnesses" who refused to accept any responsibility for error.

In all some 65 police officers gave oral evidence at the Inquiry. Sadly I must report that for the most part the quality of their evidence was in inverse proportion to their rank.

It is a matter of regret that at the hearing, and in their submissions, the South Yorkshire Police were not prepared to concede they were in any respect at fault in what occurred. ... [T]he police case was to blame the fans for being late and drunk, and to blame the Club for failing to monitor the pens. ... Such an unrealistic approach gives cause for anxiety as to whether lessons have been learnt. It would have been more seemly and encouraging for the future if responsibility had been faced.

=== Effect on stadiums in Britain ===
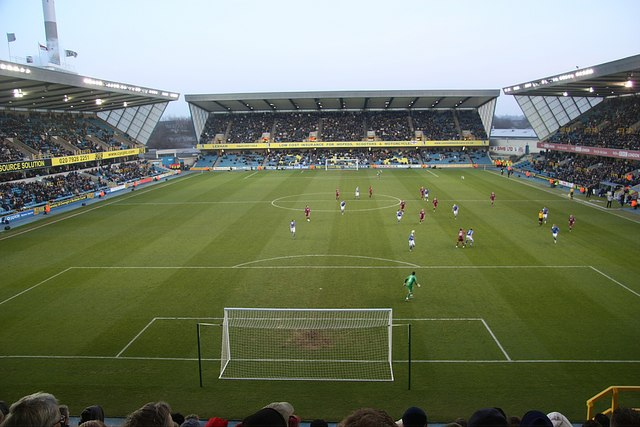
The New Den, opened in 1993, became the first new stadium fully compliant with the safety recommendations of the Taylor Report.

The Taylor Report had a deep impact on safety standards for stadiums in the UK. Perimeter and lateral fencing was removed, and many top stadiums were converted to all-seated purpose-built stadiums for Premier League, and most Football League teams since the report are all-seater. Chester City F.C.'s Deva Stadium was the first English football stadium to fulfil the safety recommendations of the Taylor Report, with Millwall F.C.'s The Den being the first new stadium to be built that fulfilled the recommendations.

Lord Taylor noted that the evidence he received was overwhelmingly in favour of more seating accommodation, and that most was in favour of reversing the two-thirds to one-third standing-seating ratio. His final report made 76 recommendations, including a reduction in standing in line with this evidence but that, after a given timescale, all stadiums designated under the Safety of Sports Ground Act 1975 should admit spectators to seated accommodation only. A number of his recommendations were not implemented, including all-seating for sports other than football. The Football Spectators Act 1989 contained a regulation requiring football grounds to become all-seated as directed by the Secretary of State. This was to be overseen by the Football Licensing Authority (now the Sports Grounds Safety Authority).

In July 1992, the government announced a relaxation of the regulation for the lower two English leagues (known now as League One and League Two). The Football Spectators Act does not cover Scotland, but the Scottish Premier League chose to make all-seater stadiums a requirement of league membership. However, the regulations were applied to Berwick Rangers, a team located in England and playing in Scotland's national leagues. In England and Wales, all-seating is a requirement of the Premier League and of the Football League for clubs who have been present in the Championship for more than three seasons.

Several campaigns have been active in attempting to get the government to relax the regulation, and allow standing areas to return to Premiership and Championship grounds.

== Consequences ==
As a result of the Taylor Report, most clubs refurbished or rebuilt stadiums (partly, and in some cases completely), while others built new stadiums at different locations. This was the case with clubs who were frequently playing in the upper two divisions of the English league during the first half of the 1990s, as well as clubs from the third tier who were on the verge of making the breakthrough to the league's top two divisions.

These changes resulted in a number of terraces being replaced by all-seater stands, two of the early examples being Manchester United's Stretford End and Arsenal's North Bank, which were both demolished in the summer of 1992. Two years later, Aston Villa's Holte End and Liverpool's Spion Kop were both demolished.

The 1990s saw the closure of some of the oldest football stadiums in England, including Middlesbrough's Ayresome Park and Sunderland's Roker Park, in favour of new sites which were more suitable for all-seater capacities that would have been practically impossible on the site of the existing grounds. Although a number of clubs from the lower divisions had relocated during the intervening years, Middlesbrough's relocation in 1995 was the first permanent relocation of any top division club for more than 70 years.

The clubs who remained at their existing homes inevitably saw a significantly reduced capacity, with attendances at matches being lower still while the conversion work was taking place, although the clubs who took part in the new FA Premier League from the 1992–93 season had money from the disbursement of the sale of television rights to help fund redevelopment work. Clubs that had progressed through the football league pyramid from lower levels in a short space of time during the 1990s, were allowed to keep standing accommodation in the top two divisions after the end of the 1993–94 campaign. The most recent Premier League club to have standing accommodation were Fulham in 2001–02, as they had been in the fourth tier of English football six seasons previously and reached the second tier in 1999. Clubs to have had standing accommodation in the second tier of English football since the mid 1990s include Reading, Stoke City, Oxford United, Gillingham and more recently Colchester United, Brentford and Yeovil Town. With the exception of Gillingham and Yeovil, this was due to the club planning relocation to a new all-seater stadium.

Bolton Wanderers had standing accommodation at Burnden Park right up to its closure at the end of the 1996–97 season, after which they relocated to the all-seater Reebok Stadium. Bolton had first announced their intention to leave Burden Park in favour of a new all-seater stadium just before winning promotion from the league's third tier in 1993.

This included a season in the Premier League, and a total of three seasons in Division One. Sunderland, who left Roker Park for the Stadium of Light at the same time, also had standing accommodation in the Premier League during their old stadium's final season in use. However, the club had been seeking a move to a new stadium for at least five years before relocation was completed, which was delayed when the original plan for a new stadium next to the local Nissan factory collapsed.

Southampton had converted The Dell into an all-seater stadium in the early 1990s as a short-term measure to comply with the Taylor Report, reducing capacity to just over 15,000, while a site for a new larger stadium was identified. It closed in 2001 on the completion of St Mary's Stadium.

Leicester City had briefly considered relocation at the beginning of the 1990s but then decided to redevelop Filbert Street, building a new 9,500-seat stand there in 1993 and filling in the remaining standing areas, although by 1998 relocation was again being considered, with attendances rising and Leicester doing well on the pitch, and finally happened when the Walkers Stadium was completed in 2002.

Arsenal had converted Highbury into an all-seater stadium with a capacity of nearly 39,000 (down from more than 60,000 in the late 1980s) in 1993, with further expansion of Highbury considered. However, further expansion of Highbury was complicated by the fact that two of the stands were listed structures. Local residents objected to any further expansion at Highbury and the local council was not sympathetic. After a failed bid to take over Wembley Stadium in 1998, the Arsenal board announced in November 1999 that an industrial site at Ashburton Grove had been selected as the site for a new 60,000-seat stadium. The new stadium was originally planned to be completed in 2003, but a long battle for planning permission meant that the new Emirates Stadium finally opened in time for the 2006–07 season.

Manchester City had originally taken the option of redeveloping their existing stadium, Maine Road, which became all-seater in 1995 following a redevelopment which included two stands being rebuilt, which gave it a capacity of 35,000. There were plans for further redevelopment which would have taken the capacity beyond 40,000, but these were postponed following relegation from the Premier League in 1996, and by the end of the decade, plans for further expansion at Maine Road were abandoned after the club agreed to become tenants at the new Eastlands site, where a new sports stadium was being built for the 2002 Commonwealth Games. Manchester City moved to Eastlands (now called the Etihad Stadium for sponsorship reasons) at the start of the 2003–04 season.

Wimbledon moved out of the dilapidated Plough Lane stadium in 1991, to become tenants at Crystal Palace's Selhurst Park, which was redeveloped as an all-seater stadium. This was expected to be a short term measure for a few seasons until Wimbledon found a site for a new stadium of their own, but ended up lasting 12 years and ended in controversial circumstances. Plans for a new 20,000-seat stadium in the London Borough of Merton had been unveiled in 1988, with the intention of relocation being completed in the early 1990s, but never materialised and the site was later developed for other uses. Various plans for a new stadium were reported throughout the 1990s, even a move to Dublin, before in 2003 the club relocated to Milton Keynes where they played at the National Hockey Stadium (adopting the name Milton Keynes Dons in 2004) before moving into a new permanent home – Stadium MK – in 2007. To maintain a presence in the London Borough of Merton, a group of Wimbledon fans set up a new club (AFC Wimbledon) after the move to Milton Keynes was given the go-ahead in May 2002, and the club played at Kingstonian's Kingsmeadow Stadium, later taking over ownership of the stadium, although a move to a new stadium in the London Borough of Merton was always the club's long-term aim. In November 2020, AFC Wimbledon finally moved into a new stadium at Plough Lane, almost 30 years after the departure of the original Wimbledon club from the area.

Some clubs had started upgrading their stadiums before this rule was introduced. For example, St Johnstone in Scotland arranged for the construction of McDiarmid Park in the mid 1980s. The stadium opened in time for the 1989–90 season and was already nearing completion when the Hillsborough disaster occurred.

Coventry City had made their Highfield Road stadium all-seater during the early 1980s, but within a few years, it had reintroduced standing accommodation after the all-seater format proved unpopular with fans; the club later reverted to an all-seater capacity in the early 1990s following the Taylor Report, and left Highfield Road for the larger Ricoh Arena in 2005.

A number of clubs seriously considered relocation in response to the Taylor Report – and did so in the years ahead – but ultimately decided to remain at their original location. These include Newcastle United in the mid 1990s, and Liverpool, who in the early 2000s had plans to leave Anfield in favour of a new stadium in nearby Stanley Park, which at one stage they were considering sharing with local rivals Everton, but these plans collapsed after a decade in favour of expansion work at Anfield. Everton, on the other hand, have since decided to relocate from Goodison Park to a new stadium which opened in February 2025 and will host the Toffees' Premier League matches starting with the 2025–26 season, nearly 30 years after relocation was first planned by the club's then owners.

== See also ==
- Development of stadiums in English football
- Hillsborough Independent Panel
