= Borussia-Park =

Football stadium

Coordinates: 51°10′29″N 6°23′8″E

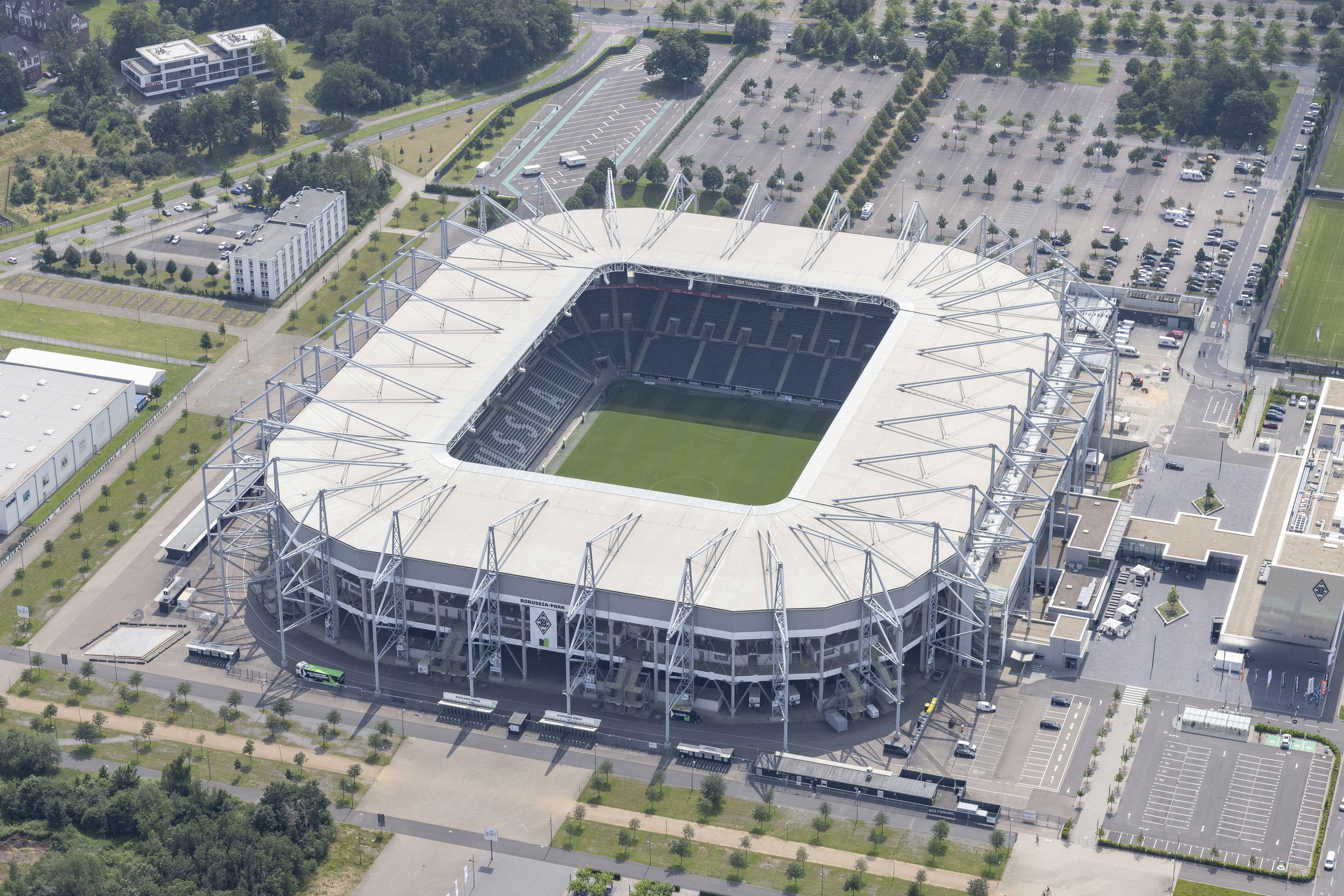
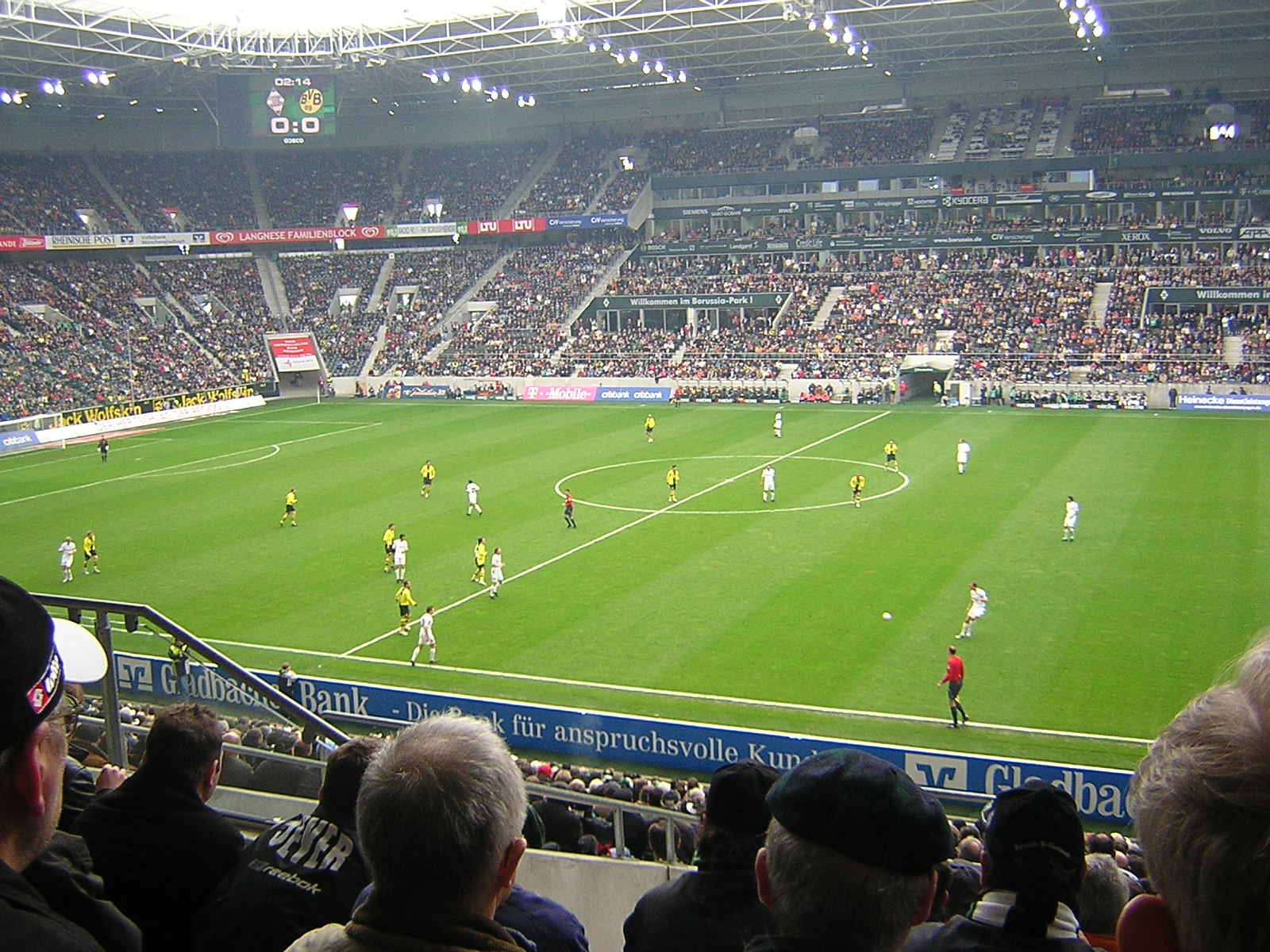
- Interactive map of Borussia-Park
- Location: Hennes-Weisweiler-Allee 1, Mönchengladbach, North Rhine-Westphalia, Germany
- Owner: Borussia Mönchengladbach
- Operator: Borussia VfL 1900 Mönchengladbach GmbH
- Capacity: 54,057 (League matches); 46,249 (International matches)
- Surface: grass
- Field size: 105 × 68 m

Construction
- Opened: 30 July 2004
- Cost: € 85 million
- Architect: Marc Laurens

Tenants
- Borussia Mönchengladbach (2004–present); Germany national football team (selected matches)

Borussia-Park (German pronunciation: [boˈʁʊsi̯aˌpaʁk]; stylised as Stadion im BORUSSIA-PARK) is a football stadium in Mönchengladbach, North Rhine-Westphalia, Germany which serves as the home stadium of Bundesliga club Borussia Mönchengladbach.

It replaced the smaller Bökelbergstadion, which no longer satisfied modern safety standards and international requirements, in July 2004.

Borussia-Park has a capacity of 54,057, of which 16,145 are standing places in the terraces due to popular demand. For international games, the terraces are converted into temporary seating which reduces the stadium's overall capacity to 46,249.

The new stadium features amenities such as VIP lounges, a fan shop and sports bar, and cost 85 million euros to construct.

Despite its large capacity and relative modernity, the stadium missed out on holding matches during the 2006 World Cup, which Germany hosted. It was the largest capacity Bundesliga stadium not to host World Cup matches, although it did host matches in the 2011 Women's World Cup.

It was again not selected as a venue for Germany's first bid as a united nation for the UEFA flagship event EURO 2024.

With an average occupancy rate of 95.1%, it is one of the most frequently visited football stadiums in Europe, placing 13th in 2017 (between Liverpool F.C. and Hamburger SV). This is despite the relatively small size of the city of Mönchengladbach.

== 2011 FIFA Women's World Cup ==
Date	Time (CET)	Team #1	Result	Team #2	Round	Spectators
29 June 2011	18:15	Brazil	1–0	Australia	Group D	27,258
5 July 2011	20:45	France	2–4	Germany	Group A	45,867
13 July 2011	18:00	France	1–3	United States	Semi-finals	25,676

== Gallery ==
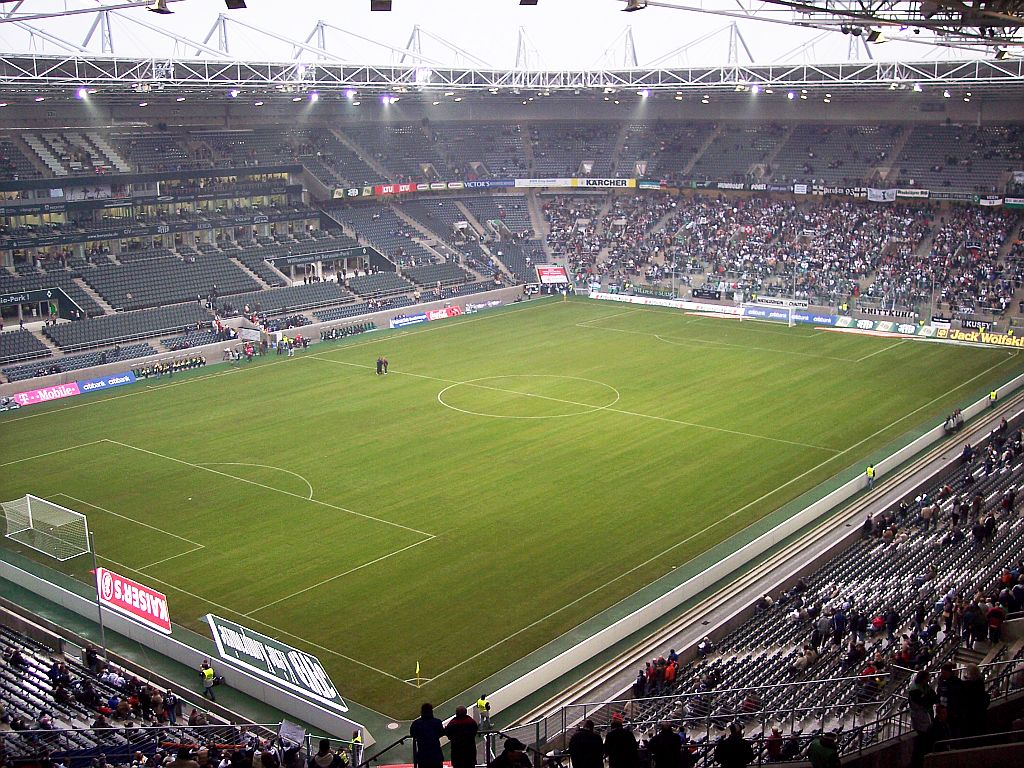
Borussia-Park

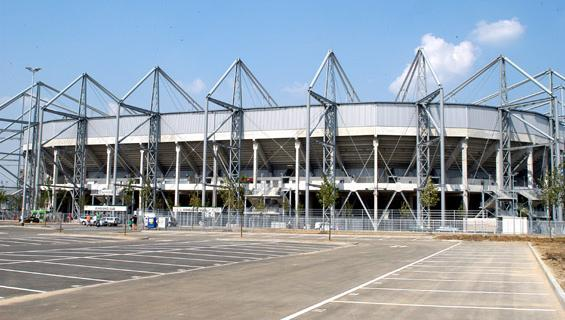
Borussia-Park

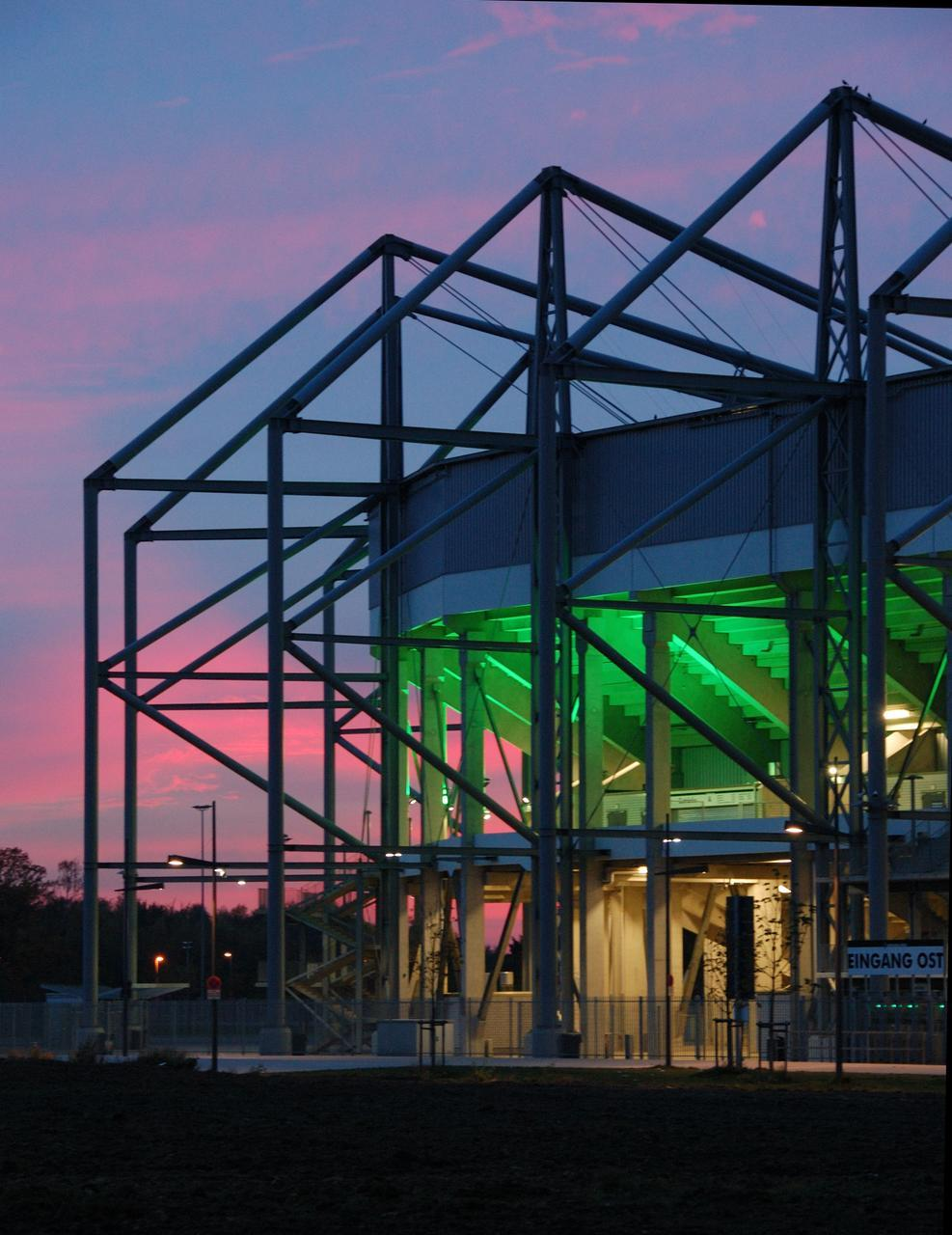
Borussia-Park

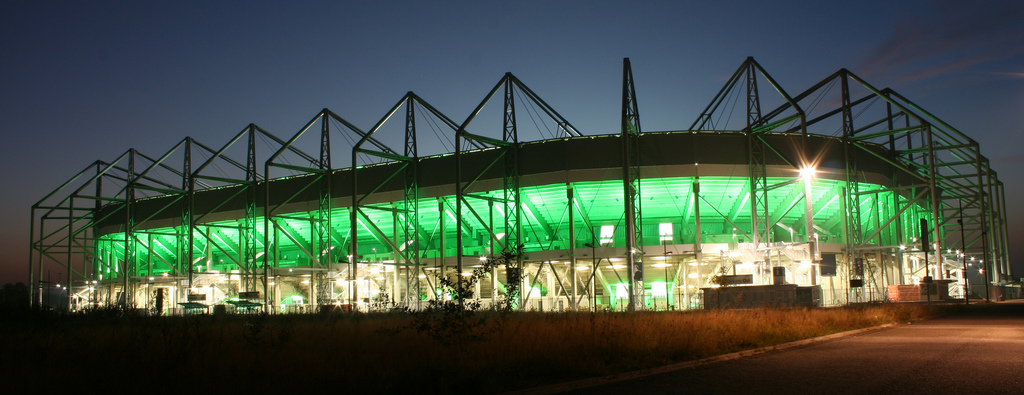
Borussia-Park

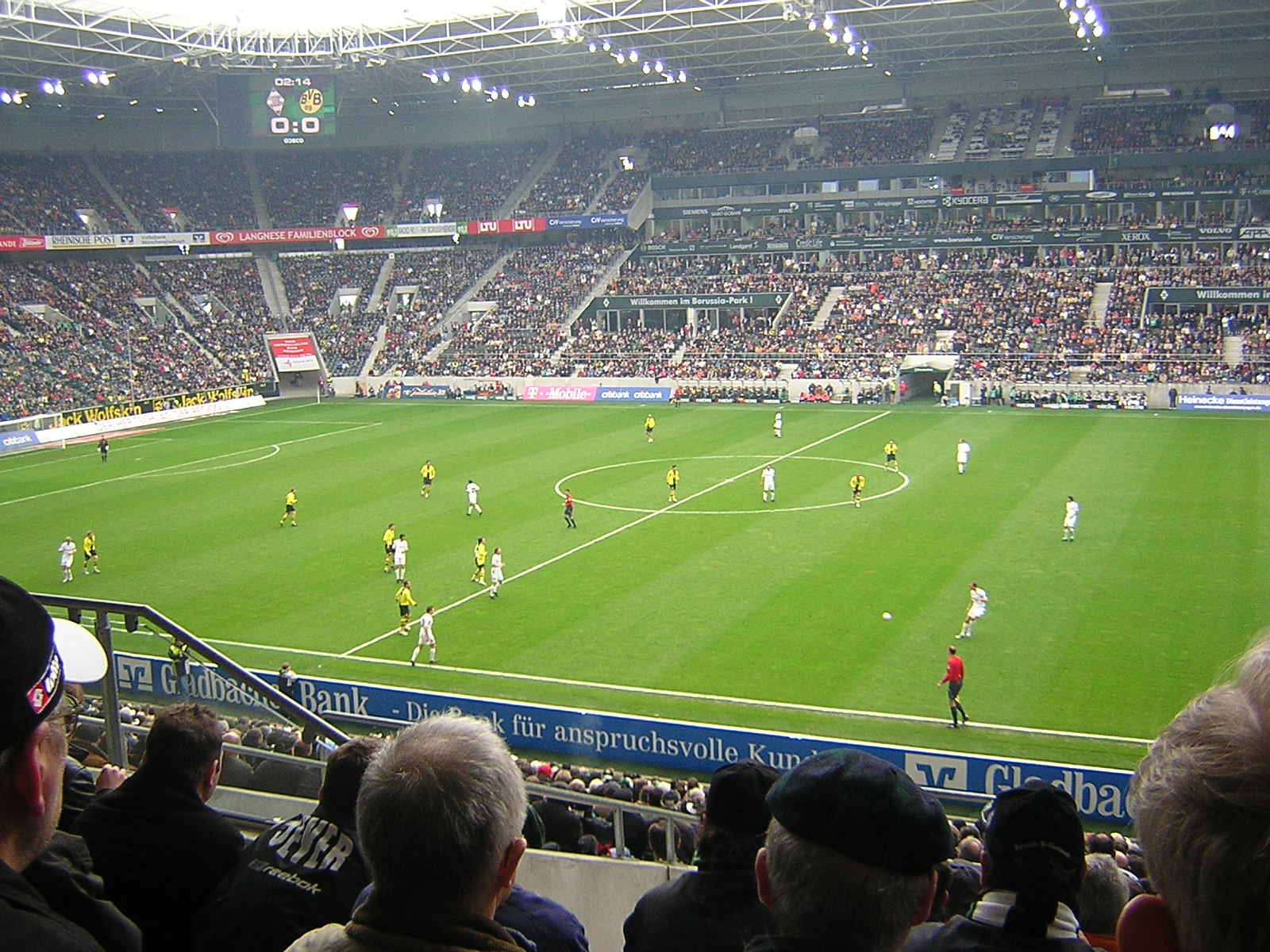
Borussia-Park

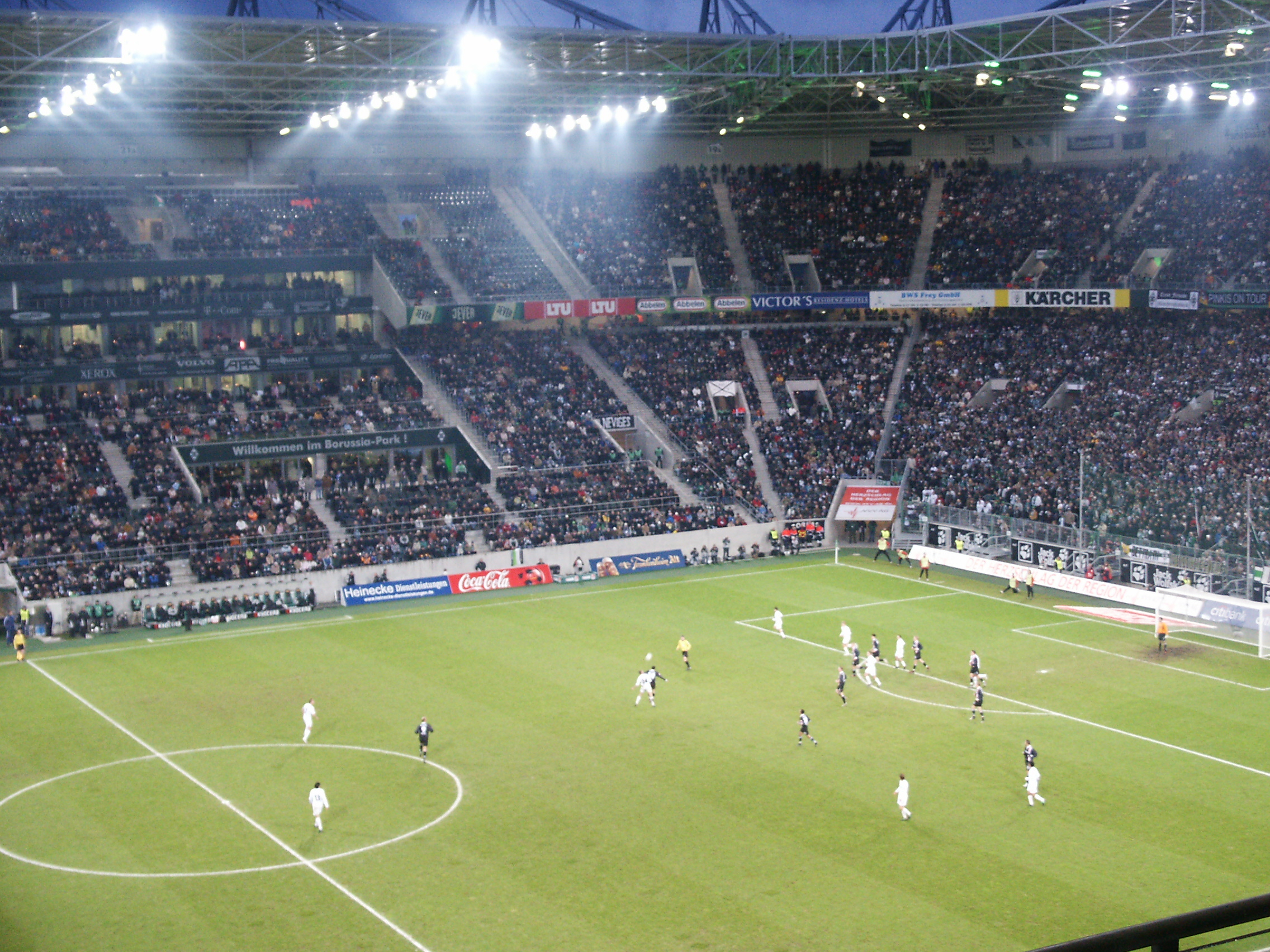
Borussia-Park

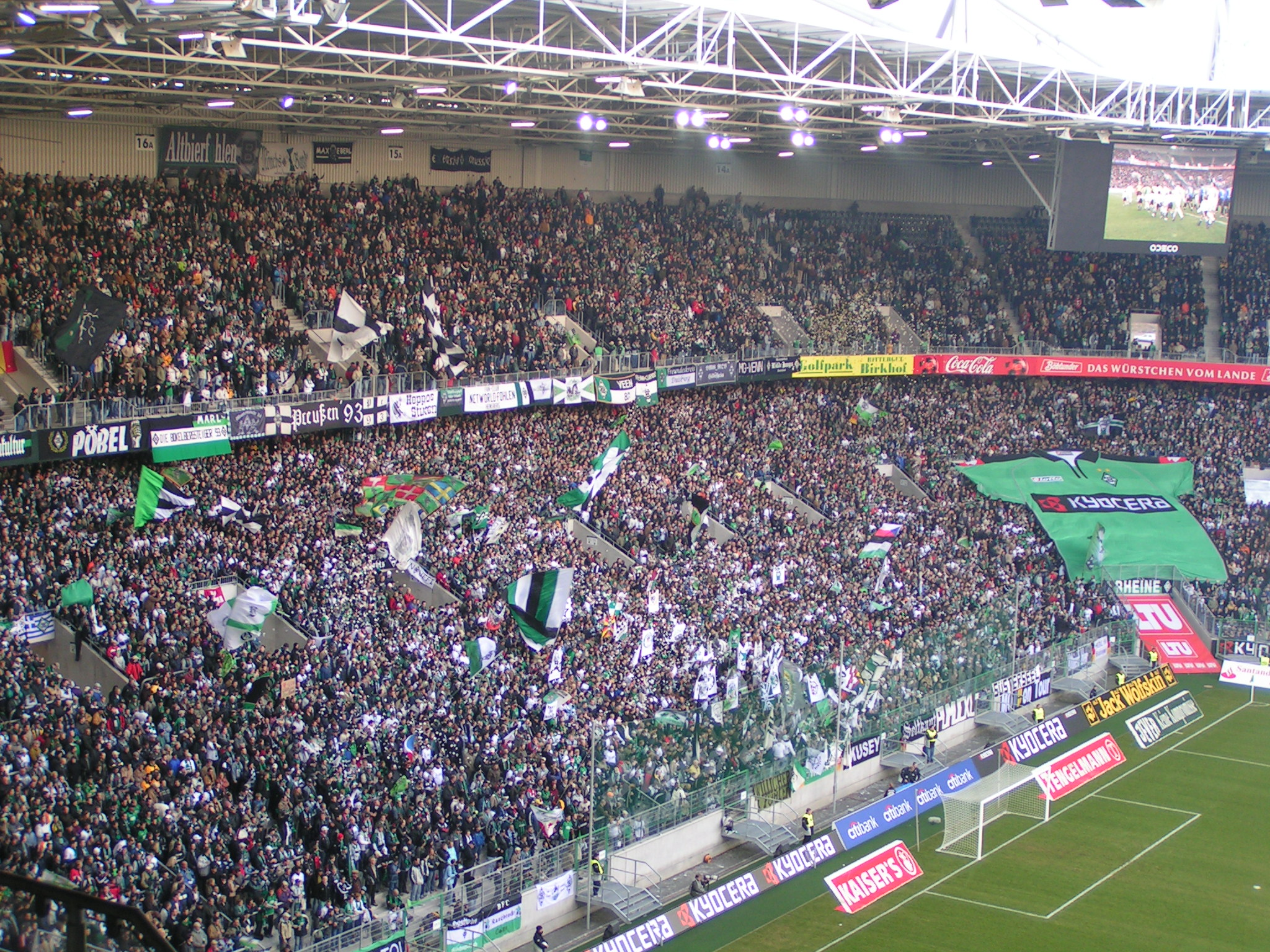
Borussia-Park

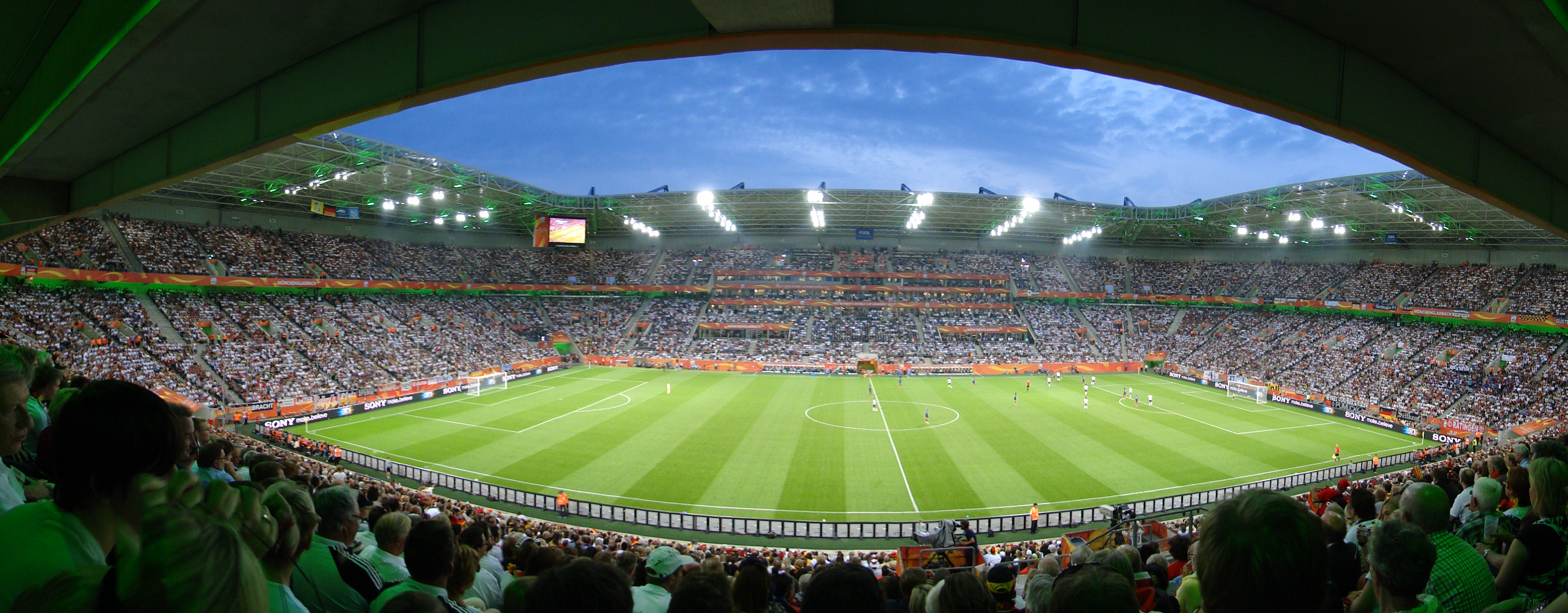
Panoramic view of the stadium.
