= Safe standing =

Crowd control measure at stadiums

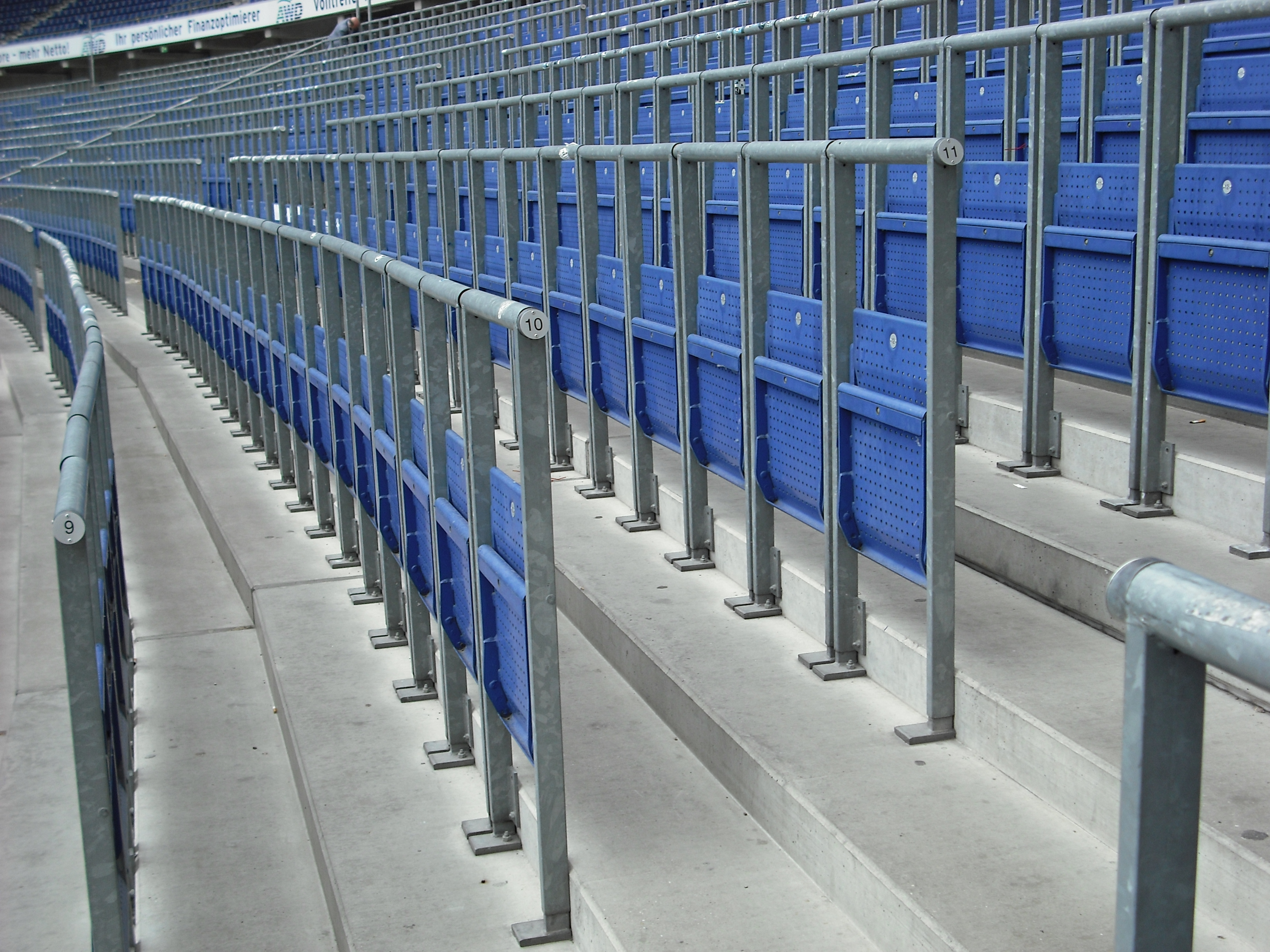
A "safe standing" area, using rail seats, at the HDI Arena in Hanover, Germany

Safe standing is a measure of design in stadia to ensure that spectators are able to stand safely during events. It is important in the context of association football in the United Kingdom, where a series of fatal incidents led to legislation requiring major clubs to develop all-seater stadiums during the 1990s. Since then, fan groups have campaigned against the ban on standing accommodation, arguing that new design options would allow designated standing areas to be built in compliance with all safety laws and guidelines. As these options are outlawed in England and Wales, safe standing in practice originated in continental Europe, primarily Germany. This occurred because although UEFA and FIFA required all-seater stadiums for international competition, it was not mandatory for domestic matches.

== Background ==
Traditionally most football grounds in the United Kingdom had terraces at each end and often on lower tiers along each side. Most supporters watched football standing up. In the late 1980s, the average standing capacity in grounds was roughly twice the number of seats. Some football administrators saw the removal of terraces as a solution to a problem with hooliganism that had arisen in British society in the 1970s. Under the chairmanship of Jimmy Hill, Coventry City F.C.'s Highfield Road became England's first all-seater football stadium in 1981. However, the experiment failed to prevent disorder or increase attendances and two years later seats were removed from part of the ground.

On 15 April 1989, a crush on the Leppings Lane terrace of Hillsborough during an FA Cup semi-final resulted in the deaths of ninety-seven Liverpool supporters. Overcrowding had resulted from a gate being opened on police instructions to relieve severe congestion outside the ground and failure to direct supporters away from the already full central pens. Fences at the front of the terrace prevented fans escaping the crush. The subsequent inquiry led by Lord Justice Taylor concluded that the immediate cause of the disaster was the failure to cut off access to the central pens when the gate was opened. His report stated that the pens were already overfull because no safe capacities had been set and there was no effective way of monitoring crowd density. Taylor showed that the turnstile access for Liverpool supporters was inadequate and that the congestion outside the ground was therefore predictable. He was highly critical of South Yorkshire Police's planning and performance on the day and of the conduct of senior officers at the inquiry.

Taylor noted that the evidence he received was overwhelmingly in favour of more seating accommodation and that most was in favour of reversing the two-thirds to one third standing / seating ratio. The Taylor Report made 76 recommendations, including that, after a given timescale, all stadia designated under the Safety of Sports Ground Act 1975 should admit spectators to seated accommodation only. A number of his recommendations were not implemented, including all-seating for sports other than football.

The 1989 Football Spectators Act contained a regulation requiring football grounds to become all-seated as directed by the Secretary of State. This was to be overseen by the Football Licensing Authority (now the Sport Grounds Safety Authority). In July 1992, the British Government announced a relaxation of the regulation for the lower two English leagues (known now as League One and League Two). The Football Spectators Act does not cover Scotland and although the Scottish Premier League chose to make all-seater stadia a requirement of league membership for some time, this rule was relaxed in December 2011. In England and Wales all-seating is a requirement of the Premier League and of the Football League for clubs who have been present in the Championship for more than three seasons.

== Forms of safe standing ==
The relevant UK guidelines for sports ground safety, the Green Guide, sets out the parameters for building and managing modern standing terraces. New stadia, such as Morecambe FC's Globe Arena (opened in 2010) with standing for over 4,000 spectators and St. Helens rugby league club's Langtree Park (opened in 2012) with standing for almost 8,000, continue to be built with terraces and are operated safely in accordance with the Guide.

In addition to well-designed conventional terraces other forms of accommodation for standing spectators have been developed outside of the UK, which can also be considered options for the creation of safe standing areas. One country that has developed such alternative forms of standing accommodation is Germany. All German Bundesliga grounds permit standing and many have very large standing areas. Until as recently as 2004, for instance, top-flight German club Borussia Mönchengladbach's home stadium, the Bökelbergstadion, provided standing accommodation for over 25,000 fans and seats for under 9,000. Today, Borussia Dortmund's Signal Iduna Park (a.k.a. the Westfalenstadion) provides standing accommodation for 25,000 fans in its South Stand, which is commonly called the Yellow Wall.

The standing accommodation at many German grounds is in the form of conventional terraces. The alternative forms of accommodation have been developed for those grounds at which not only domestic games are played, but also games under the jurisdiction of the sport's European and/or world governing bodies, i.e. UEFA and FIFA respectively. Since the summer of 1998, UEFA has specified that all games in its competitions (at that time the Champions League and UEFA Cup, now the Europa League) must be played in all-seater stadia. To continue to accommodate standing fans at domestic matches and yet be able to convert their stadia into all-seater facilities for UEFA games, the German clubs developed a range of solutions. Some clubs use more than one option.

=== Bolt-on seats ===
Several clubs adapt their grounds to UEFA all-seater requirements by bolting temporary seats to the steps of otherwise essentially conventional terraces and removing the crush barriers. After the UEFA match, the seats are then removed again and the barriers put back. Stadiums that operate in this way include those of Schalke 04 and Borussia Mönchengladbach.

=== Fold-away seats ===
A small number of clubs adapt to the UEFA requirements by using seats that fold away under aluminium terrace steps. For domestic games such areas look like conventional terraces with intermittent crush barriers. For UEFA games the barriers are removed, the aluminium steps folded back and the seats flipped up. After the UEFA game, the procedure is reversed. German clubs using fold-away seats are Fortuna Düsseldorf and FC Bayern Munich.

=== Rail seats ===
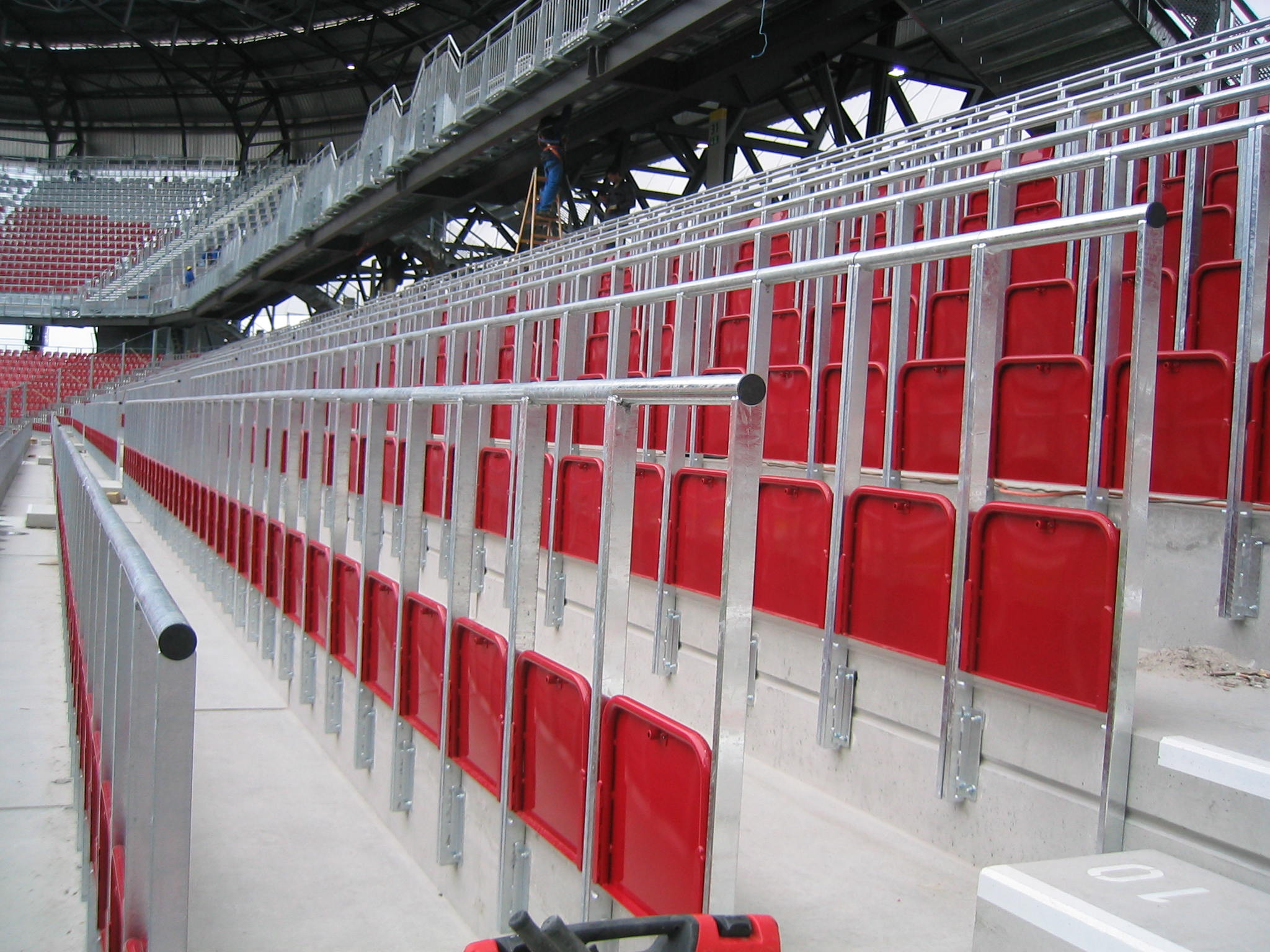
Rail seats in Klagenfurt, Austria

Almost half of the top-flight Bundesliga clubs convert standing areas to all-seater configuration by using rail seats. Each metal seat is incorporated within a robust metal frame that forms a waist-high rail for the spectators in the row behind. These seat frames are installed on a permanent basis with the same spacing as standard seats. The frames interlock to form a continuous high-strength rail along the full length of each row. Rail heights vary between 90 and 115 centimetres (35 and 45 in). For domestic games the seats remain locked flush between the uprights of each frame, thus providing accommodation and maximum space for standing fans between rows of the waist-high rails. Prior to UEFA games, the seats are unlocked, thus transforming the area into all-seater configuration. After the UEFA game, the seats are locked again in the upright position ready for use by standing fans at the next domestic match. German clubs using rail seats include Werder Bremen, Hamburg SV, VfL Wolfsburg, Hannover 96, TSG 1899 Hoffenheim, VfB Stuttgart, Bayer Leverkusen and Borussia Dortmund.

In July 2016, Celtic formally unveiled their new 2,600 capacity rail seating area within Celtic Park, becoming the first British club to do so. The club had obtained a "safe standing" certificate 13 months earlier after years of negotiations with supporters, football authorities and Glasgow City Council.

Rail seats were installed at San Mamés in Bilbao in 2019 (expanded in 2022).

In April 2024, Liverpool FC announced plans to convert the entirety of the Kop at Anfield into a rail seating area, with work scheduled to commence during the close-season and expected to finish that summer. This marks their first end with full accommodation for rail seats. Additionally, the lower end of the Anfield Road Stand has also been converted into a safe standing area through the introduction of rail seating sections.

== Arguments for and against safe standing ==
A range of arguments are put forward in favour of all-seating and against the return of standing areas to the top divisions of football in England and Wales. The four issues of demand, safety, crowd disorder and diversity, are summarised below:

=== Demand ===
In 2011, the standard government reply to those writing to ministers and MPs stated, "Before any change in legislation there would have to be a very clear demand".

Polls of supporters repeatedly show a clear majority favouring the choice to stand, with an average of around 80% supporting the introduction of standing areas in the top divisions. In a poll by The Football Fans Census (January 2009) 92% of 2,046 respondents voted that fans should be given the choice to stand in safe standing areas. A similar survey, run by the Football Supporters Federation and reported upon on the BBC website on 17 August 2012, showed that 91.1% of fans want the choice to sit or stand. A new survey in 2015 showed that 96% of football fans in the UK backed a safe standing pilot to trial modern stadium technology.

According to Peter Caton in his book Stand Up Sit Down, demand for standing is also illustrated by the number of supporters who stand in front of their seats in all-seater stadia, which in 2011 he estimated to be 65,000 per week. Peter Caton goes on to claim that demand is also illustrated by the many examples at lower league clubs where a greater number of supporters often choose to stand than sit (e.g. Accrington Stanley, Burton Albion, Dagenham & Redbridge, Stevenage, Torquay United).

=== Safety ===
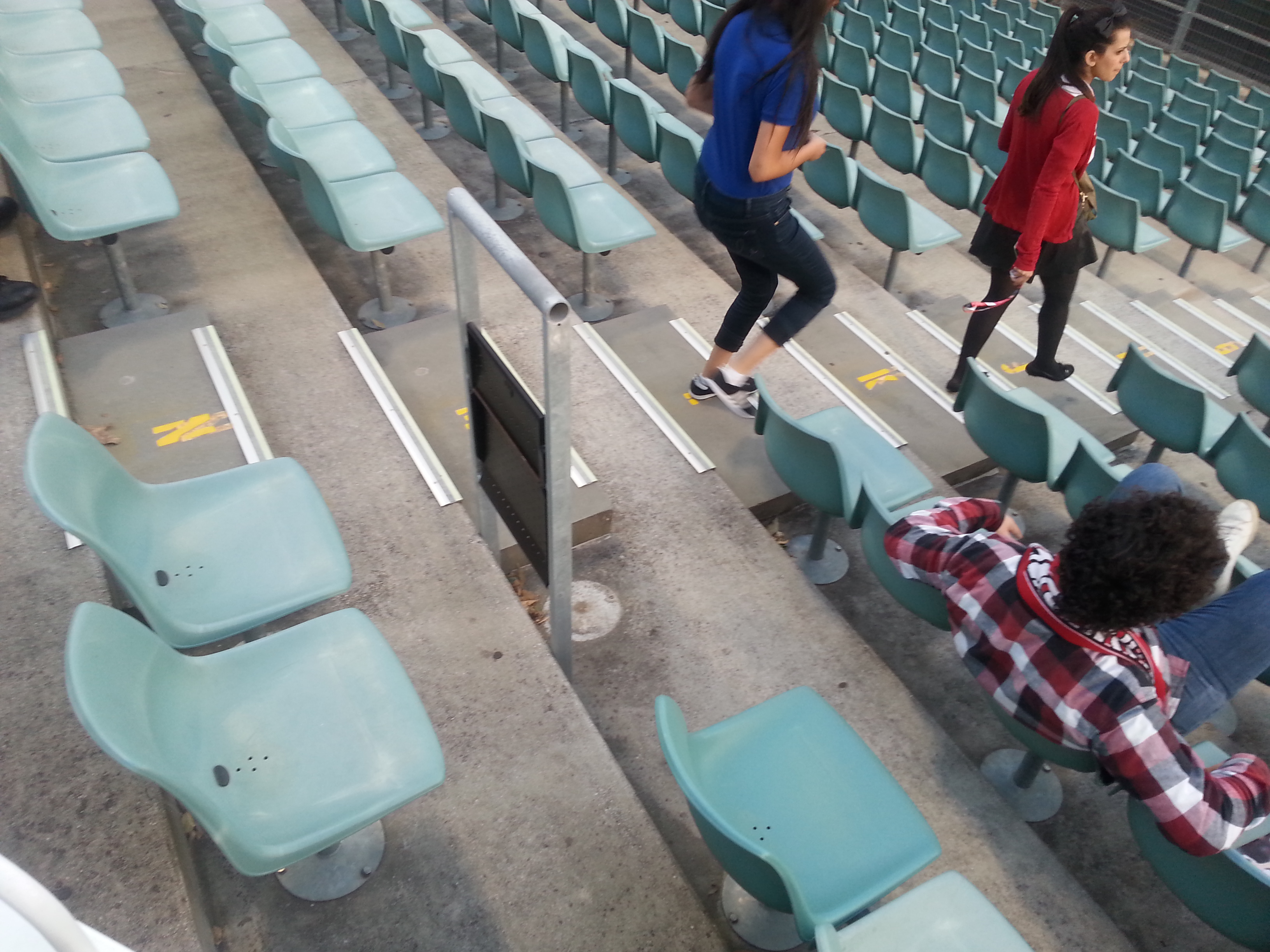
Safe Standing Test installation at Parramatta Stadium

Safety is commonly perceived to be the main reason for all-seating. The Taylor Report refers to capacity control, stating that seating allows those in charge to know the exact number of supporters in a particular part of a ground. He also refers to swaying and surging, stating that these cannot occur in all-seated stadia, where, he says, "involuntary and uncontrolled crowd movements occasioned by incidents in the game are effectively eliminated".

This has been mitigated by access technology, as laid down by the Green Guide at all major UK football grounds. Longer crush barriers allow a far shorter unhindered run. With rail seats, where there is a barrier along every row, surging is physically impossible. The Taylor Report includes the statement made by the Technical Working Party, whose report Lord Taylor accepted, that "standing accommodation is not intrinsically unsafe".

=== Crowd disorder ===
Analysis of statistics on football related arrests and banning orders published by the UK Home Office show that in both the 2008/9 and 2009/10 seasons the rate of arrest per 100,000 supporters was higher at League One and League Two clubs with all-seated grounds than at those with standing. Overall arrest rates for football-related offences decreased steadily from 34 per 100,000 in 1988/89 to 9 per 100,000 in 2009/10; however, the trend of reducing arrests started before stadia were required to become all-seated and has continued since.

=== Diversity ===
It is sometimes said that all-seated stadia have led to increased diversity of those attending football matches. It is true that more families attend matches than they did in the 1970s and 1980s when hooliganism was a major problem, but this increased diversity has occurred at grounds retaining terraces as well. Increased prices, which are partly related to the lack of lower-cost standing accommodation, have, however, led to a reduction in the number of teenage supporters attending football matches and an increase in the average age of crowds. Level Playing Field (the trading name of the National Association of Disabled Supporters) has no objection in principle to safe standing areas per se, provided they do not impact on facilities and services for disabled fans or hinder their views or sightlines.

== Worldwide ==
=== England and Wales ===
After publication of the Taylor Report there was opposition to the all-seater recommendation from the Football Supporters Association, but no concerted campaign was mounted. With the Hillsborough disaster fresh in the memory, there was no appetite to oppose Taylor's recommendations. The first serious campaign in support of the choice to stand was set up in 1999, initially with the aim of securing standing areas at Manchester City's new stadium: SAFE – Standing Areas for Eastlands. With the backing of the Football Supporters Association the campaign then became SAFE – Standing Areas for England.

In 2001, the Football Supporters Association and National Federation of Football Supporters Clubs merged, becoming the Football Supporters Federation (FSF). In 2002, safe standing became an official FSF campaign. In 2004, a new campaign, Stand Up Sit Down was set up, initially with the aim that suitable areas of all-seated grounds should be allocated for ‘managed standing’ in front of seats. The campaign soon broadened to back other solutions for standing and in September 2009 merged with the FSF's 'Safe Standing' campaign.

The Safe Standing Roadshow works alongside the FSF to promote rail seats. The FSF see 'rail seats' as the most suitable safe standing solution for Premier League and Championship stadia, as they enable clubs that have an expectation of playing in European competition to provide accommodation for standing spectators at domestic games while being able to convert such areas to all-seater configuration to fulfil UEFA and FIFA requirements. The roadshow has persuaded some clubs to support safe standing.

In December 2013, the Football League sent a document to each of its member clubs asking for their opinion on standing accommodation. Around 70% of the clubs indicated in this consultation that they wanted the Football League to lobby the Government for a change in the rules to permit safe standing areas for football matches, which the League executive agreed to do.

In 2014 Bristol City installed a small demonstration block of rail seats and announced plans to install two areas of rail seating during redevelopment of the stadium starting that summer. Initially the "safe standing" areas would only be used during Bristol Rugby matches held at the stadium as the current regulations prohibit their use for football matches. Peterborough United FC also revealed plans to install safe standing rail seats in the Moy's End section of London Road Stadium over the summer if government regulations would allow.

In July 2014, the Welsh Assembly passed a motion by 26 votes to 1 (with 20 abstentions) calling for a pilot of safe standing in Wales. In February 2015, the Welsh Conservatives then published the results of a survey showing 96% backing for a pilot from supporters.

In February 2015, Grimsby Town announced plans to install rail seating at their Blundell Park ground. In August 2016, West Ham United co-chairman, David Gold voiced a desire to introduce safe standing in West Ham's new ground, the London Stadium. This followed reports of some West Ham fans fighting each other in disagreements as to whether they should be sitting in their seats.

In response, West Ham threatened to withdraw season tickets from those who continued to stand in their seats.

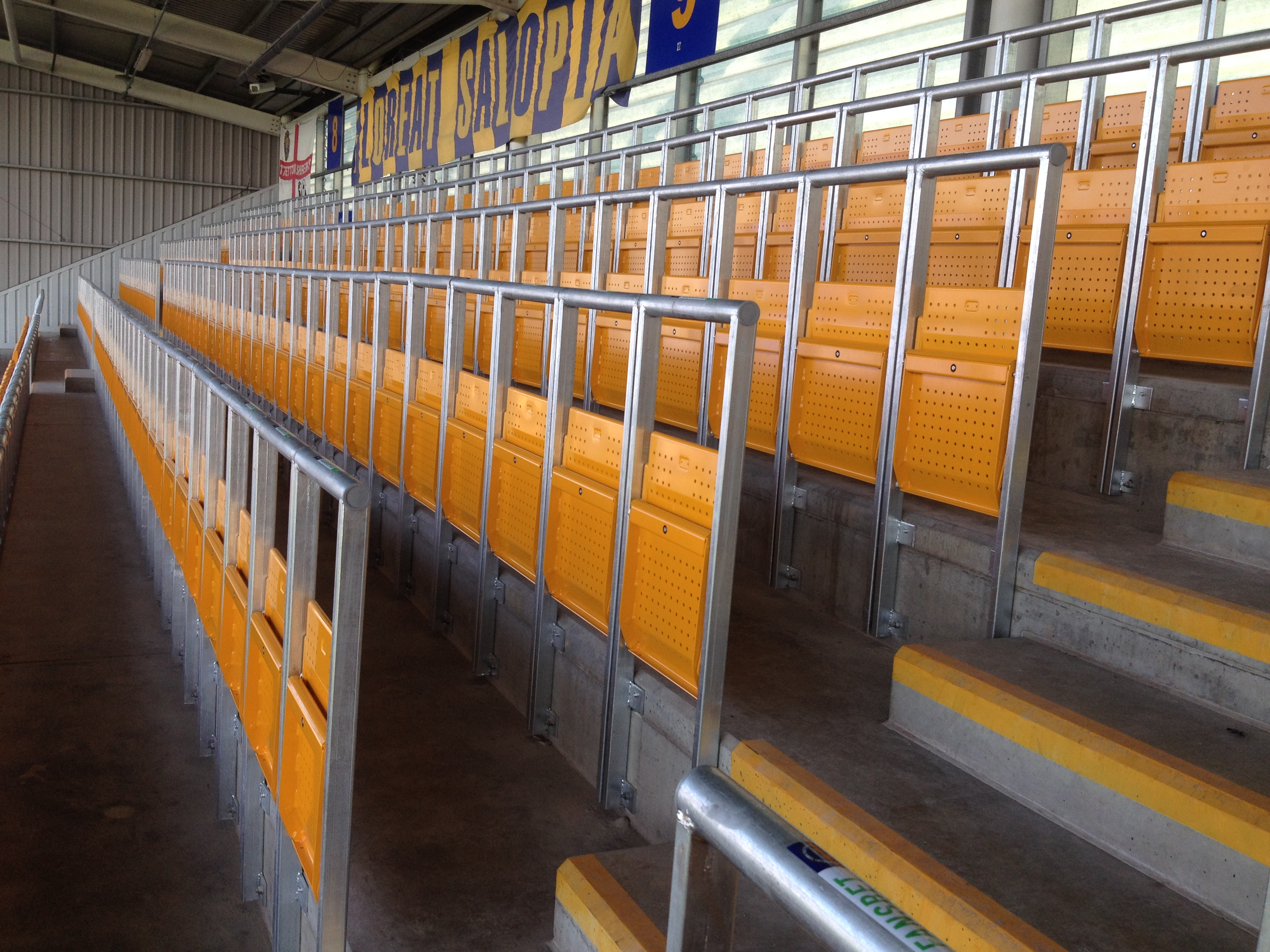
Rail seats at Shrewsbury Town

In November 2016, the 20 Premier League clubs met to have a preliminary discussion on safe standing.

As of August 2017, a total of 25 clubs in England and Wales playing in the Premier League and Football League have backed safe-standing. Premier League clubs who have expressed support for safe standing include Manchester City, Aston Villa and Swansea City. In April 2018, an application for a safe standing area by West Bromwich Albion at The Hawthorns was rejected by the government who argued that "all-seater stadiums remain the best means of ensuring the safety and security of fans". On 23 April, Crystal Palace asked fans to sign a petition which calls for Parliament to debate safe standing. In May 2018, Shrewsbury Town F.C. became the first club in England and Wales to install rail seats to be used as a safe standing area for 550 fans.

In January 2018, Owen Riches founded the petition campaign, which gained 112,026 signatures over 6 months, leading to a parliamentary debate on 25 June 2018, where Tracey Crouch announced a government review into Safe-Standing.

On 8 June 2018, Shadow Sports Minister Dr Rosena Allin-Khan announced formal Labour Party support for safe standing.

In December 2019 Manchester United applied to install rail seating for up to 1,500 fans in Old Trafford. In April 2020, the club announced that a trial would be carried out of 1,500 barrier seats in the 2020–21 season.

In March 2021, Manchester City confirmed their intention to install rail seating over the summer of 2021 in preparation for 2021/22 season. The installation will consist of 5,600 rail seats and will be future-proofed in readiness for potential change in legislation to permit safe standing areas in football stadia.

In September 2021 the Premier League and the EFL Championship announced they would start trialing for safe standing in stadiums. Five clubs in the 2021–22 Premier League and Championship – Cardiff City, Chelsea, Manchester City, Manchester United and Tottenham Hotspur – were to take part in a trial of safe standing starting on 2 January 2022 and running until the end of the season.

=== Scotland ===
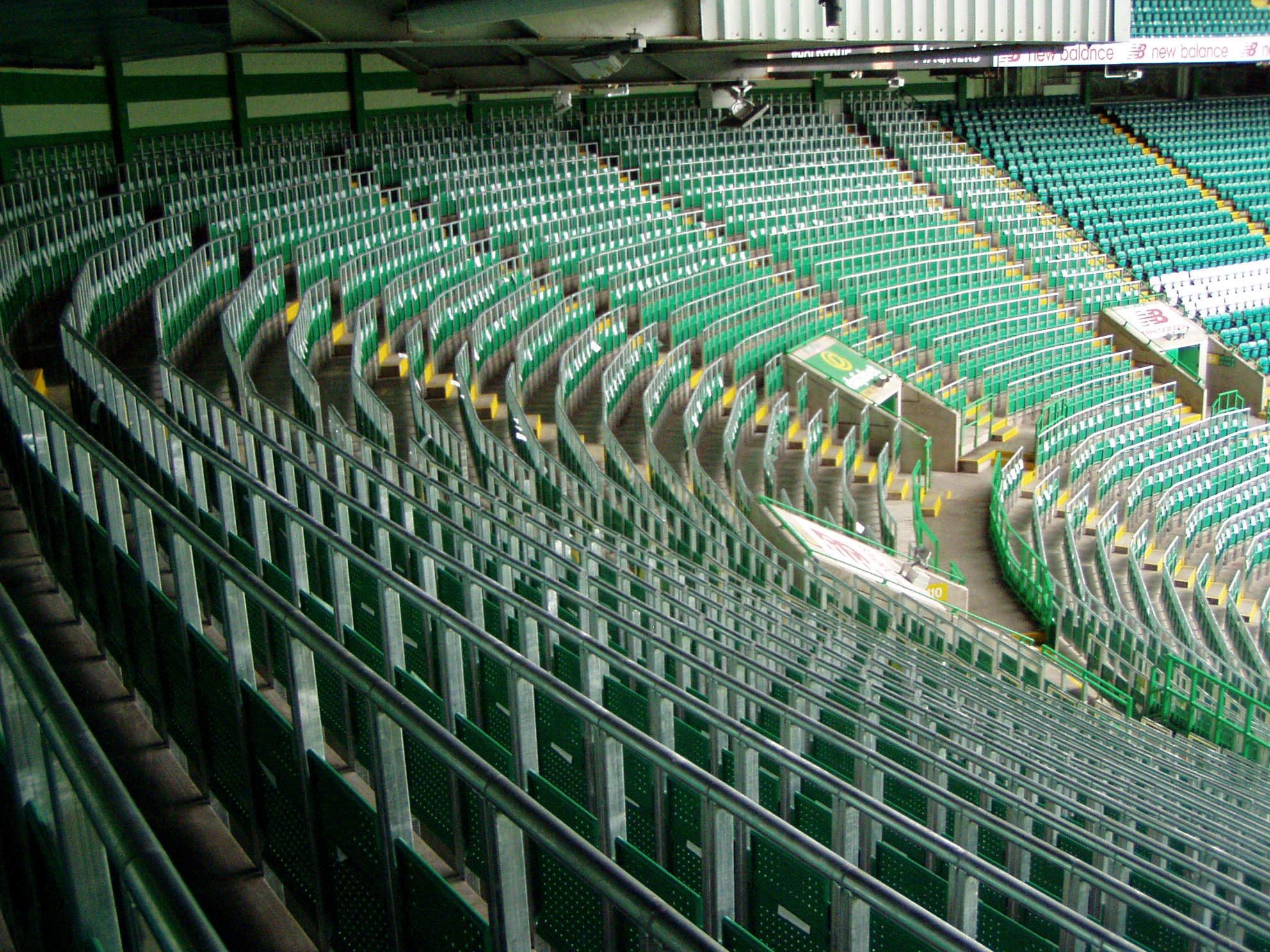
Rail seating at Celtic Park

The legislation that relates to all-seater accommodation at football grounds in England and Wales (the 1989 Football Spectators Act) does not apply in Scotland. In 1998, the Scottish Premier League made it a condition of membership that clubs had to have an all-seater stadium. Many clubs outside Scotland's top tier have standing sections in their stadiums; prior to the 2013 merger of the SPL and SFL that formed the current Scottish Professional Football League, standing terraces could be used in the Scottish Cup, Scottish League Cup, Scottish Challenge Cup matches along with matches in the Scottish Football League Divisions 1, 2 and 3. On 19 December 2011, the Scottish Premier League announced that its all-seater requirement was being relaxed and that member clubs would be permitted to apply to pilot safe standing areas at their grounds, with this policy continued by the current top flight, the Scottish Premiership. Scottish TV reported that "The league’s chief executive, Neil Doncaster, says a particular form of safe standing currently used by eight top-flight teams in Germany, known as rail seats, will be the permitted form of new-style terracing". Nine out of twelve SPL clubs immediately indicated an interest in safe standing. Standing is now permitted at all football matches in Scotland.

June 2015 saw Celtic become the first club to receive permission to move ahead with 'safe-standing' areas, using railseating, after years of negotiations with supporters, football authorities and Glasgow City Council.

=== Australia ===
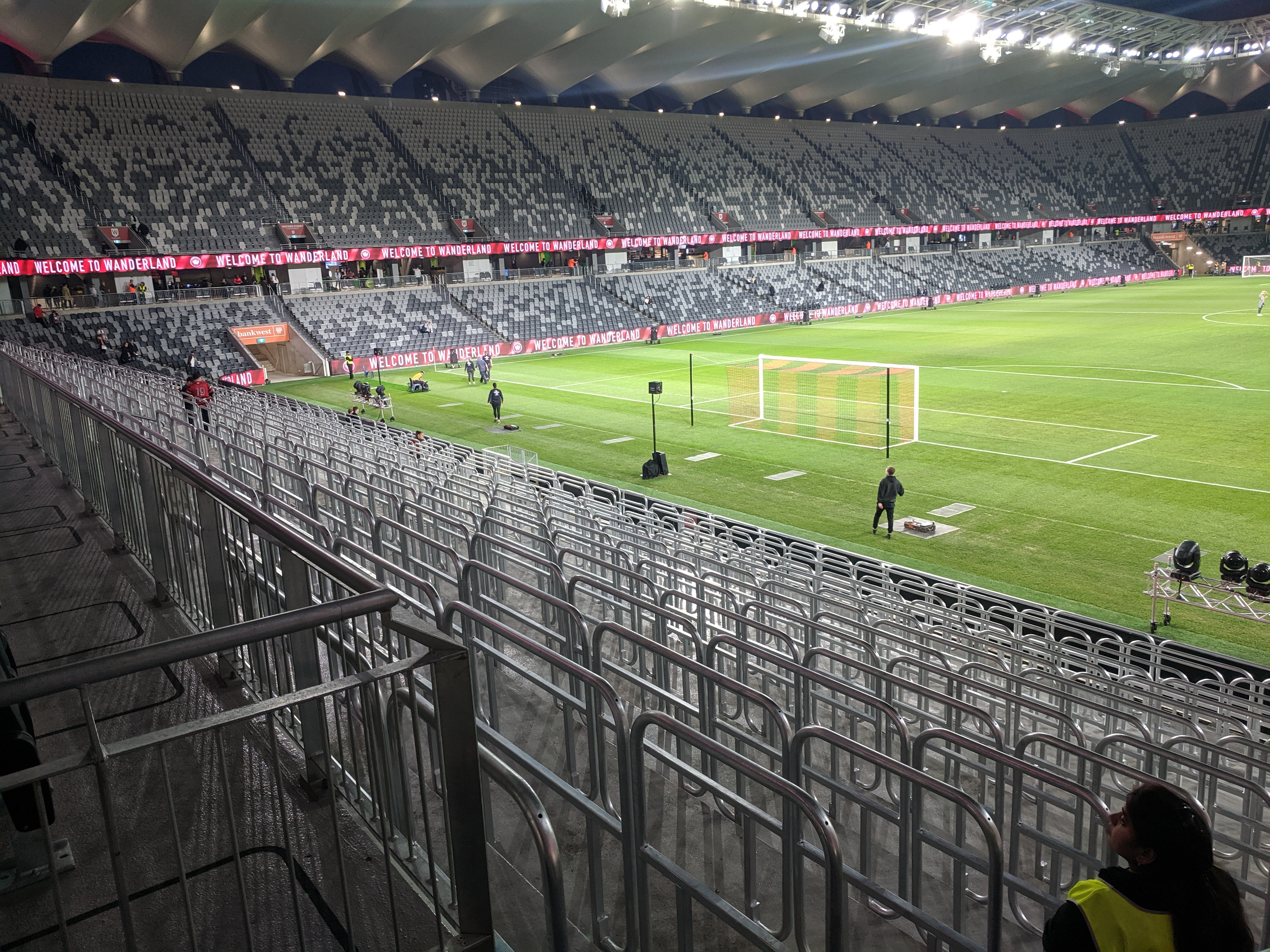
Safe Standing Area at the Western Sydney Stadium, in Australia

The Western Sydney Wanderers planned to install German style rail seating into the Red & Black Bloc active support section of their home ground Parramatta Stadium, as part of a larger capacity and facility upgrade in 2014. The stadium imported seven sets of rail seats into the country, and performed a successful trial installation at the ground. The government cancelled the upgrade, instead deciding on the stadium being knocked down and rebuilt.

The Western Sydney Stadium includes 1,000 places of safe standing capacity as part of the overall capacity of 30,000. It is the first modern installation of safe standing in Australia. As the stadium is a dual use for both football and rugby codes and is owned by the State Government rather than an individual club, the safe standing area was designed in a dual mode configuration. It that allows the section to be converted back and forth between regular seating and crush barriers rather than lockable rail seats. It uses a modular system where blocks of three seats, or a single anti-crush rail can be quickly interchanged. The three central bays of the stadium's lower bowl Northern end are outfitted in this manner.

The rebuilt Sydney Football Stadium (2022) also includes the same style of convertible quick change seats or rails as those at the Western Sydney Stadium. They are used in the three central bays of the lower bowl in the Northern End.

=== United States ===
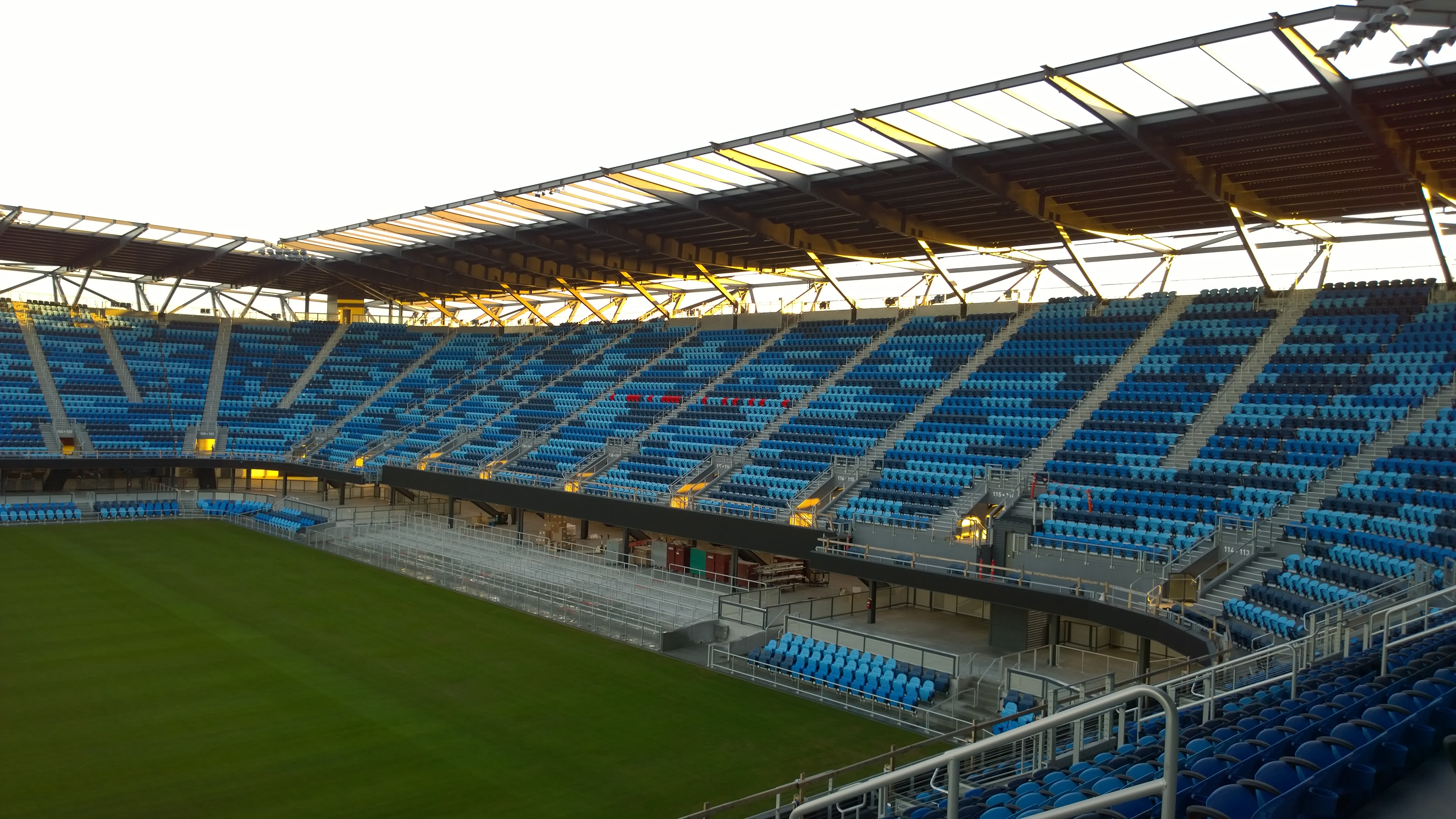
The safe standing section at PayPal Park

FedExField, home of the Washington Commanders American football team, had many seats removed in favor of luxury suites and standing-room only "party decks", a process that began in 2012. These party decks are terraced safe standing areas, much like those in many European stadiums.

PayPal Park, home of the San Jose Earthquakes, was the first soccer-specific stadium in the United States to have a safe standing section, opening in March 2015. In 2017, Orlando City SC opened a new stadium that has large safe standing sections for their end-line supporter's section. In April 2018, LAFC completed construction on the venue now known as BMO Stadium, which includes a safe standing zone. In July 2018, D.C. United opened Audi Field, which has two sections behind the North-end goal with safe standing for both D.C. United and NWSL's Washington Spirit games, as well as those of the XFL's DC Defenders. At a 34-degree incline, the LAFC standing section was the steepest in MLS. Minnesota United FC's stadium, Allianz Field, which opened in 2019, has a safe standing area called the "Wonderwall" that has a 34.9-degree incline. At Chase Stadium, the temporary home of Inter Miami CF, the supporter section on the stadium's north end was built at a 34-degree incline, the maximum steepness permitted by MLS. Victoria Block safe standing section is home to LA Galaxy supporter groups, Angel City Brigade, Galaxians, Galaxy Outlawz and is located in sections 120–123.

The Tampa Bay Rowdies of the USL also have a safe standing area in the supporter section (sections 109 and 113) at Al Lang Stadium.

UBS Arena, home of the New York Islanders hockey team in Elmont, New York, has installed safe standing sections at the top of section 329, home of the Blue and Orange Army, a supporters group. These sections became one of the first safe-standing sections for an indoor professional arena in the United States.

The Tennessee Volunteer baseball team had a safe standing section for students installed at Lindsey Nelson Stadium in 2025.

=== Hungary ===
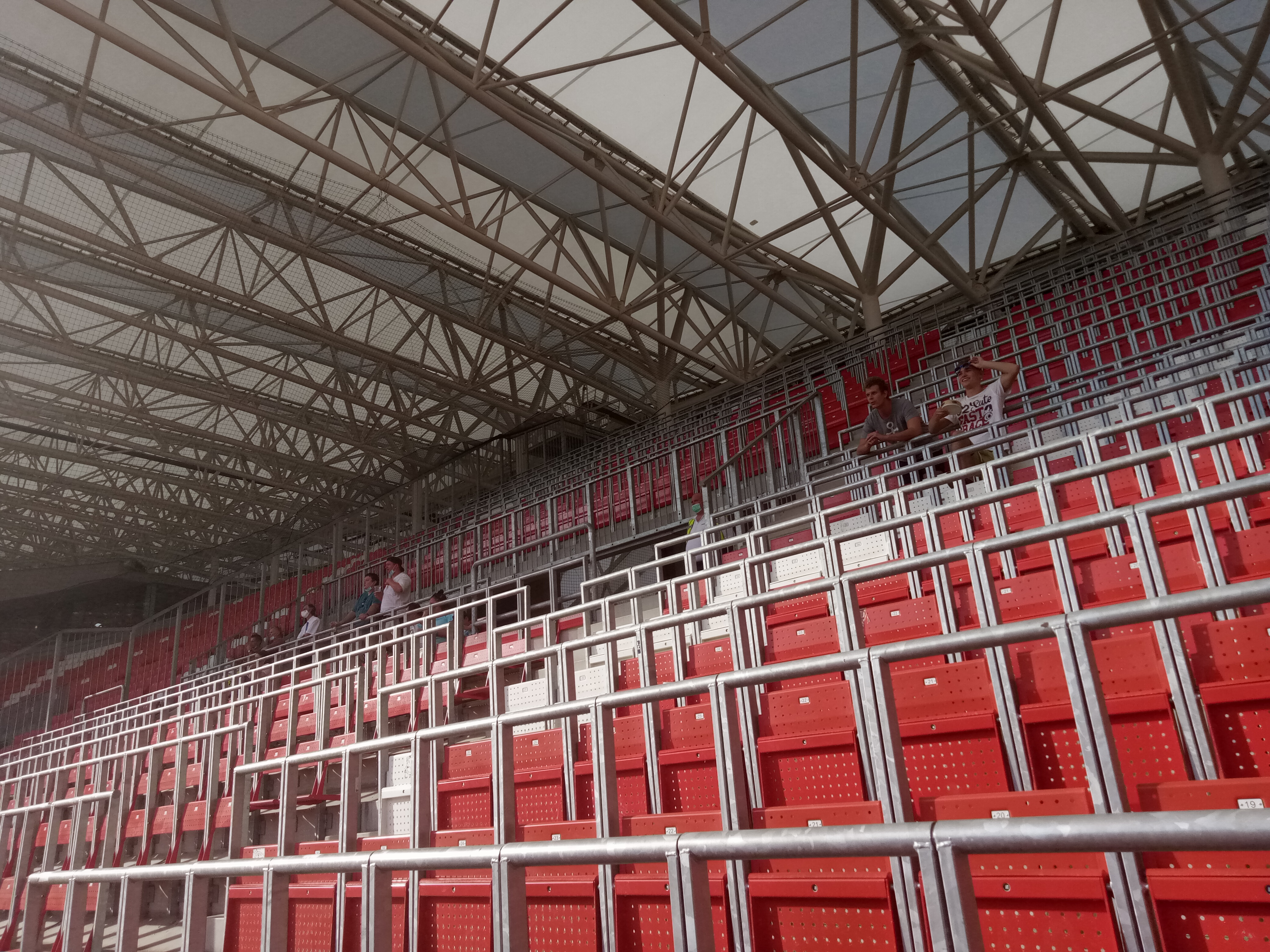
Away sector of the Nagyerdei Stadion, which is an all-safe-standing area

After the second government of Viktor Orbán formed in 2010, widespread stadium construction programs started which affected nearly all teams that play or played in the Nemzeti Bajnokság I. While most of these stadiums were built as all-seater venues, two notable exceptions exist: the Nagyerdei Stadion in Debrecen, opened in 2014, and the Illovszky Rudolf Stadion in the 13th district of Budapest, both of which have their home back-of-the-goal sectors and away sectors covered with safe standing areas.

== See also ==
- List of English Football League and National League stadiums with terracing
