= Brian Woolnough =

British sports journalist

Brian Woolnough (30 September 1948 – 18 September 2012) was a British sports journalist and Chief Sports writer for the Daily Star.

Previously a writer for The Sun, in 1999 the Daily Mirror tried unsuccessfully to hire him. Woolnough was hired by the Daily Star in 2001 after owner Richard Desmond authorised a £200,000 pay package.

In December 2004, following Norwich City's 4–0 defeat at Chelsea, Woolnough produced a Monday morning column that enraged many Norwich fans, saying that City were "gutless," that they would "stink the place out" with Premiership performances of a similar ilk, and that he "Hopes they go down, and good riddance." Woolnough was strongly criticised for the article in Norwich, and although refusing to withdraw his comments, he later visited Carrow Road after receiving 450 e-mails and the local newspaper getting involved with the debate.

From 2007, Woolnough was the presenter of Sky Sport's Sunday Supplement, replacing Jimmy Hill. Woolnough was previously the presenter of Hold the Back Page from 1994.

Woolnough died on 18 September 2012, aged 63 from bowel cancer although originally it was thought to be for no reason.

Gary Lineker described Woolnough as "one of football's finest journalists." The then Manchester United manager Sir Alex Ferguson said that Woolnough was "a good journalist and a good personality."
