= Sunday Supplement =

Football television programme, broadcast on Sky Sports

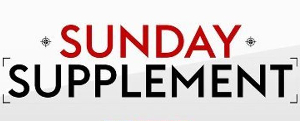
- Genre: Discussion, Sport
- Presented by: Dharmesh Sheth; Former: Jacqui Oatley, Neil Ashton, Jimmy Hill, Bill Bradshaw, Brian Woolnough
- Country of origin: United Kingdom
- Original language: English

Production
- Production location: Studio F, Sky 2 Osterley, London
- Running time: 90 minutes (inc. adverts)

Original release
- Network: Sky Sports
- Release: 1999 - Present

Sunday Supplement (formerly Jimmy Hill's Sunday Supplement) is a Sunday morning television programme in the United Kingdom about football which began broadcast in 1999 and ran until 2020 and was revived again from 2025. The programme airs on Sunday mornings on Sky Sports Premier League and Sky Sports Main Event, during the football season. The length of the show is 90 minutes, including commercials, although it was occasionally cut down to 60 minutes.

== History ==
Launched under the stewardship of Jimmy Hill, three guest football journalists sit around a table over breakfast/brunch and discuss the latest football matches, news and gossip, including a look at the football stories in the Sunday newspapers.

The proposal was that it was set in Hill's actual kitchen, with fans trying to guess where his home was from the window view. But the truth came to light on several occasions in 2006 when Hill was late claiming to be stuck in traffic.

The programme was the successor to the Friday night discussion show Hold the Back Page.

== Revamp ==
In 2007, Sky Sports decided not to renew Hill's 12-month contract, which coincided with the removal of his name from the title.

The presenter role was given to either Bill Bradshaw and Brian Woolnough. The format and setting remained consistent set over a breakfast/brunch table, but guest football journalists increased from two to three. Woolnough later took on the permanent presenter role, with regular guests including Patrick Barclay, Oliver Holt, Martin Samuel, Paul Smith and Henry Winter. After Woolnough's death in September 2012, Neil Ashton went on to host the programme after having initially stood in during his predecessor's illness. On 12 January 2020, Ashton presented the show for the final time. Jacqui Oatley was announced as the new presenter of the show on 14 January 2020.

Beginning in 2009, a podcast of the show was made available on the Sky Sports website and iTunes.

In August 2020, Sky announced the show had been cancelled for the 2020/21 season, blaming the congested fixture schedule. A podcast continued, hosted by Vicky Gomersall and Darren Lewis.

In July 2025, Sky announced Sunday Supplement would return in August 2025 and be hosted by long-serving presenter and reporter, Dharmesh Sheth.
