= Hill 16 =

Terrace at Croke Park, Dublin, Ireland

Coordinates: 53.36146°N 6.250288°W

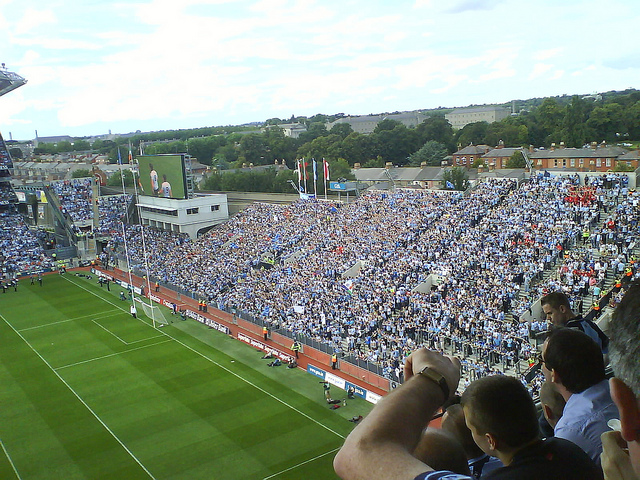
Hill 16 before a Dublin v Cork football match in 2010

Hill 16 – officially called Dineen Hill 16 and sometimes referred to as The Hill – is a terrace at the Railway End of Croke Park, the principal stadium and headquarters of the Gaelic Athletic Association (GAA). It is on the Northside of Ireland's capital city, Dublin.

== History ==
When Croke Park was first used for Gaelic games, the Railway End of the park was little more than a mound of earth. Its name was originally "Hill 60". That name came from a hill of the same name in Gallipoli on which the Connaught Rangers suffered heavy casualties in late August 1915.

"Hill 60" was used as a name throughout the 1920s and 1930s, until senior GAA figures decided it would be inappropriate to have a section of Croke Park named after a battle involving an Irish unit of the British Army. So "Hill 60" became Hill 16, a name that would link it instead to 1916, and the story emerged that it had been built from the ruins of Dublin's main thoroughfare O'Connell Street.

After the 1983 All-Ireland Senior Football Championship Final between Dublin and Galway, when overcrowding on Hill 16 caused a few supporters to suffer injuries, the GAA decided to rebuild the Hill. That work was completed in 1988, allowing a capacity of 10,000 spectators.

In the mid-1990s, the GAA came up with a masterplan to rebuild the whole stadium. It was envisaged that Hill 16 would be replaced with an all-seater stand; however, this idea met with opposition from supporters of Dublin. Dublin fans have adopted Hill 16 as a spiritual home over the years. On matchdays the hill is often a sea of blue and navy and has been said to be intimidating to opposition players. Plans were also hindered by the presence of the nearby railway line and the fact that the GAA does not own any of the land behind Croke Park. The plans were redrawn and a new – terraced – area built at a cost of €25 million to replace the old Nally Stand – named after Pat Nally – and Hill 16. The new Railway End, which includes Hill 16 and the Nally terrace, is capable of holding more than 13,000 spectators.

In 2006, the Hill was renamed Dineen Hill 16 in honour of Frank Dineen, who purchased the grounds for the GAA in 1908.

From 2007–2009, Croke Park temporarily hosted association football and rugby union matches while the bodies overseeing these sports redeveloped their own stadium on the Southside of the city. This was agreed with the GAA so as to prevent Irish national teams having to play their games in England. For most of the international association football matches, temporary seating was added to comply with the rules of that sport's governing body. At every association football game at the stadium, seats were either added to the Hill or it remained closed (despite UEFA regulations allowing terraces to be used for friendly games). Since the redevelopment of the IRFU-owned stadium at Lansdowne Road, the usage of the stadium for association football and rugby union matches ceased for a number of years. However, in 2024, Leinster Rugby will play home matches at the ground due to regenerative works on the RDS Arena.

== View ==
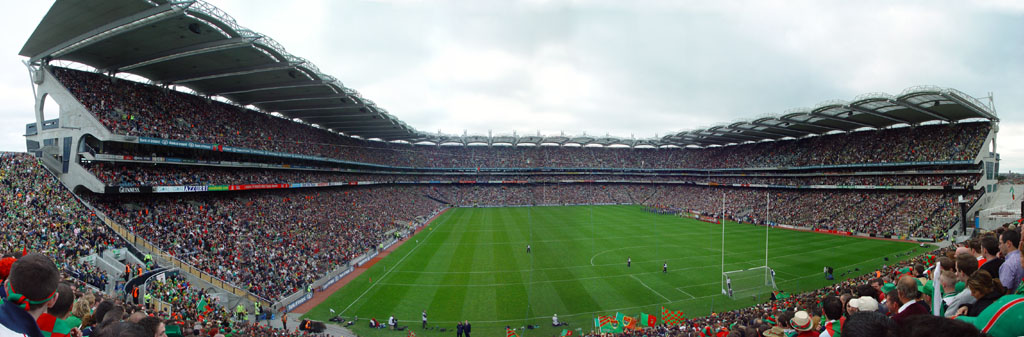
View from the Hill in Croke Park. The stadium is filled with the green and red of Mayo supporters in this photograph taken on the day of the 2004 All-Ireland Senior Football Championship Final.
