= Match (magazine) =

British sport magazine

MATCH
- Front cover on 31 May 2003, featuring Ruud van Nistelrooy
- Editor: Stephen Fishlock
- Categories: Football
- Frequency: Weekly, every Tuesday
- Paid circulation: 20,000 (July 2018)
- First issue: 6 September 1979
- Company: Kelsey Media
- Country: United Kingdom
- Language: English
- Website: Official site

Match, stylised as MATCH or MATCH!, is a weekly British football magazine aimed at the teenage and pre-teenage market. First published in 1979, the magazine had a circulation of 57,108 copies in December 2010. The magazine includes interviews, a skills school, quizzes and a weekly round-up of results, tables and player ratings from the four main English divisions and the Scottish Premier League in MatchFacts. It mostly covers teams and players in the English Premier League, but also has a limited coverage of La Liga, Serie A and international football.

== History ==
Match magazine was launched on 6 September 1979, at a cover price of 25p. The original editor was Mel Bagnall. Kevin Keegan was the first cover star of Match and supported the magazine with his column, Learn To Play The Keegan Way. The first issue came with an 80-page sticker album and included columns by Tottenham star Ossie Ardiles, Manchester United's Steve Coppell and Nottingham Forest manager, Brian Clough. Later columnists included David Platt, Mark Bright and Ryan Giggs.

In March 1980, Match launched its first Matchman Of The Month contest. The award, based on a player's match rating, was won by Ossie Ardiles. He defeated Trevor Francis to win the title and won £100. Matchman Of The Month now has no financial reward.

On its launch in 1979, the magazine initially failed to catch the dominant circulation of its main weekly football rival, Shoot. In the mid-1990s the magazine was successfully revitalised and relaunched by Chris Hunt, an editor with a wealth of experience in teenage music and sport magazines. Under his editorship Match was transformed, finally overtaking Shoot to become the biggest-selling football title in Britain, with its weekly sales peaking at 242,000 during this period. This not only marked the highest point in the magazine's sales history (a record that still stands), but the high-water mark of the British football magazine market in the 1990s. In the face of such market dominance by Match, during this period many of its rival titles either closed or, in the case of Shoot, changed frequency to monthly. Shoot finally closed in June 2008.

A number of notable football journalists have started their careers at Match, including Mark Irwin of The Sun, Hugh Sleight of FourFourTwo, Paul Smith of The Sunday Mirror, Ray Ryan formerly with The News of the World, Adrian Curtis formerly of the Mail On Sunday, Evening Standard and The Press Association; and Rob Shepherd.
