= National Association of Racing Staff =

Trade union for horse racing stable staff in the United Kingdom

- Founded: 1975; 51 years ago
- Headquarters: Newmarket, Suffolk
- Location: United Kingdom
- Members: ▼7,809 (2024)
- General Secretary: George McGrath
- Affiliations: TUC; STUC; ICTU
- Website: naors.co.uk

The National Association of Racing Staff (NARS) is a trade union in the United Kingdom for stable staff working in the horse racing industry.

== History ==
In 1975, many stable staff at Newmarket were members of the Transport and General Workers Union (TGWU). They went on strike for better working conditions, but the strike was met with hostility from trainers, jockeys and racegoers. It was settled but many strikers were not allowed to return to their jobs despite the settlement including a no victimisation clause. Some won cases at industrial tribunals. Disillusioned with the TGWU, many broke away to form the Stable Lads Association, the idea for which was Viv Baldwin's who enlisted John Oaksey and Jimmy Hill to help set it up. Tommy Delaney, a former jockey, became its first secretary. Viv Baldwin remained involved with the association until 2010. By 2007, membership stood at 1,250. The organisation then renamed itself as the National Association of Stable Staff, and within three years increased membership to 2,000. In 2009, the union affiliated with the Trades Union Congress.

In August 2017, the union renamed itself as the National Association of Racing Staff.

== Structure ==
It was based at Bretby Business Park, north of Swadlincote on the A511, in South Derbyshire. It is now based in Suffolk.
