= Paul Smith (journalist) =

Paul Smith is a leading British football journalist, currently chief football writer for tabloid newspaper The Sunday Mirror. He is a former British Sports Reporter of the Year. Before joining The Sunday Mirror, he was a deputy editor of Match.

In 2002, Smith was at the centre of a security scare that made news headlines around the world, when despite the post–September 11 security measures put in place by the organisers of the 2002 World Cup, his press accreditation was collected by an impersonator. The real Paul Smith spent two hours being questioned by Korean police before being released to continue with his coverage of the tournament.

He is a semi-regular on Sky Sports 1's Sunday Supplement.
