= List of English Football League and National League stadiums with terracing =

This is a list of football stadiums that contain standing areas (or terracing), home to teams which play in the English Football League or National League. Although the Taylor Report states that all Premier League and EFL Championship stadiums should eventually be converted to all-seaters, some teams have not done so as they either cannot afford to do so or because they want to maintain the atmosphere of their ground.

| Name | Capacity | Home team | Location | League | Notes |
|---|---|---|---|---|---|
| Wembley Stadium | 90,000 | Neutral | London | N/A | |
| Old Trafford | 74,310 | Manchester United F.C. | Trafford | Premier League | |
| Anfield | 60,725 | Liverpool F.C. | Liverpool | Premier League | |
| Etihad Stadium | 55,000 | Manchester City F.C. | Manchester | Premier League | |
| Stamford Bridge | 40,343 | Chelsea F.C. | London | Premier League | |
| Cardiff City Stadium | 33,316 | Cardiff City F.C. | Cardiff | Championship | |
| Molineux Stadium | 31,750 | Wolverhampton Wanderers F.C. | Wolverhampton | Premier League | |
| Loftus Road | 18,439 | Queens Park Rangers F.C. | London | Championship | 726 rail seats in the Lower Loft and 237 Rail Seats at the back of the R Block in the Stanley Bowles Stand. |
| Brunton Park | 17,949 | Carlisle United F.C. | Carlisle | League Two | |
| Brentford Community Stadium | 17,250 | Brentford F.C. | London | Premier League | |
| London Road Stadium | 15,315 | Peterborough United F.C. | Peterborough | League One | |
| The Shay | 14,081 | FC Halifax Town | Halifax | National League | |
| Memorial Stadium | 12,100 | Bristol Rovers F.C. | Bristol | League One | |
| Kenilworth Road | 12,000 | Luton Town F.C. | Luton | League One | 800 capacity safe standing area completed in the Oak Road stand on 1 March 2024. |
| Adams Park | 10,284 | Wycombe Wanderers F.C. | High Wycombe | League One | |
| Huish Park | 9,565 | Yeovil Town F.C. | Yeovil | National League South | |
| Abbey Stadium | 9,617 | Cambridge United F.C. | Cambridge | League One | |
| Glanford Park | 9,088 | Scunthorpe United F.C. | Scunthorpe | National League North | |
| St James Park | 8,541 | Exeter City F.C. | Exeter | League One | |
| Victoria Park | 7,866 | Hartlepool United F.C. | Hartlepool | National League | |
| Broadhall Way | 6,722 | Stevenage F.C. | Stevenage | League Two | |
| Recreation Ground | 7,100 | Aldershot Town F.C. | Aldershot | National League | |
| Whaddon Road | 7,066 | Cheltenham Town F.C. | Cheltenham | League One | |
| Pirelli Stadium | 6,912 | Burton Albion F.C. | Burton upon Trent | League One | |
| Christie Park | 6,400 | Morecambe F.C. | Morecambe | League Two | |
| Aggborough | 6,444 | Kidderminster Harriers F.C. | Kidderminster | National League | |
| Moss Lane | 6,085 | Altrincham F.C. | Altrincham | National League | |
| Victoria Road | 6,078 | Dagenham & Redbridge F.C. | London | National League | |
| Haig Avenue | 6,008 | Southport F.C. | Southport | National League North | |
| The Hive Stadium | 5,176 | Barnet F.C. | London | National League | |
| Plough Lane | 9,215 | AFC Wimbledon | London | League Two | New stadium with Safe standing |
| Rodney Parade | 7,850 | Newport County A.F.C. | Newport | League Two | |
| Crown Ground | 5,057 | Accrington Stanley F.C. | Accrington | League Two | |
| Cressing Road | 4,151 | Braintree Town F.C. | Braintree | National League South | |
| Highbury Stadium | 5,327 | Fleetwood Town F.C. | Fleetwood | League One | |
