= Jimmy Hill =

English association football personality (1928–2015)

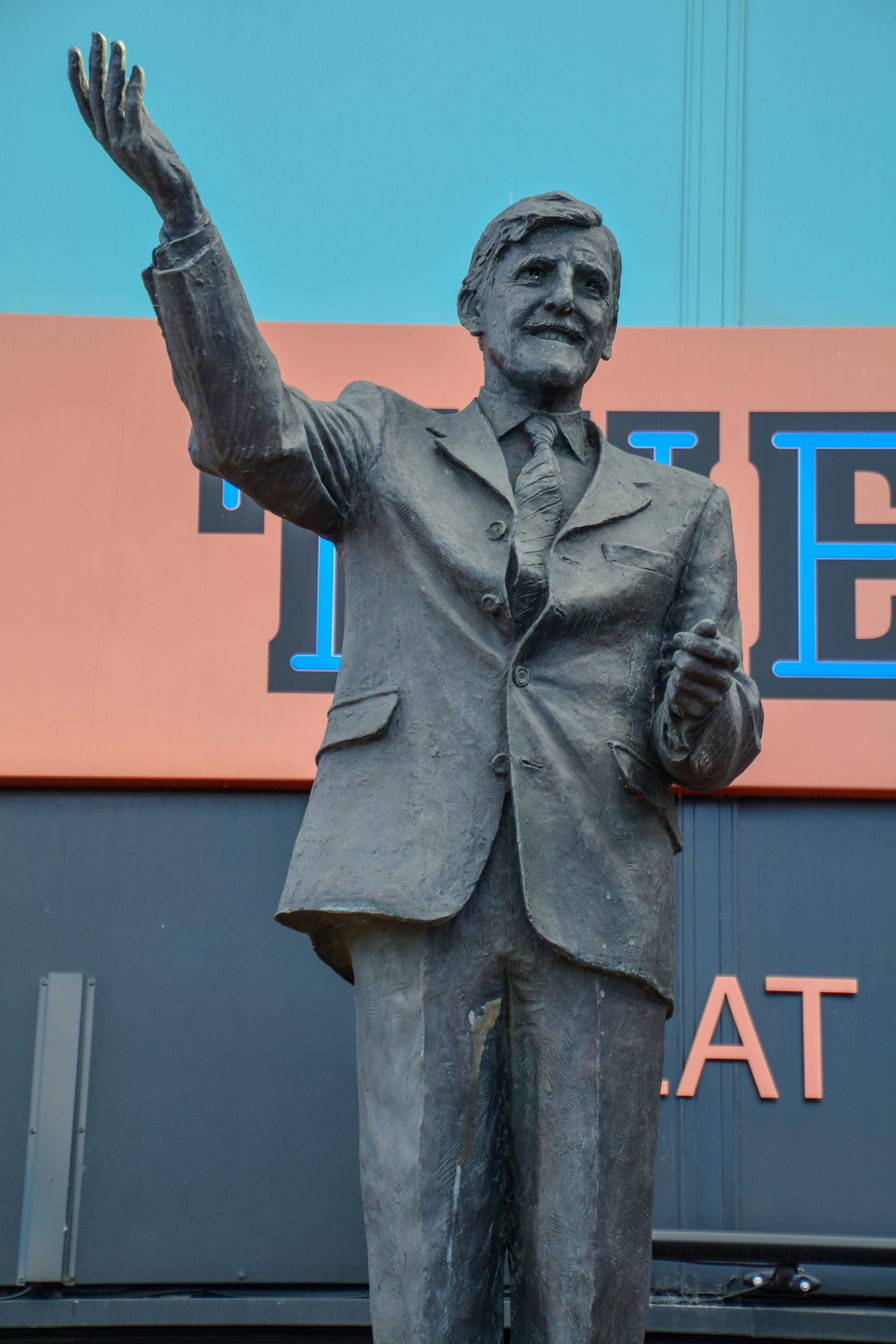
- Statue of Jimmy Hill outside Coventry Building Society Arena

Personal information
- Full name: James William Thomas Hill
- Date of birth: 22 July 1928
- Place of birth: Balham, England
- Date of death: 19 December 2015 (aged 87)
- Place of death: Hurstpierpoint, England
- Position: Inside right

Senior career*
Years	Team	Apps	(Gls)
1949–1952	Brentford	83	(10)
1952–1961	Fulham	276	(41)
Total		359	(51)

Managerial career
- 1961–1967: Coventry City
- * Club domestic league appearances and goals

James William Thomas Hill, OBE (22 July 1928 – 19 December 2015) was an English footballer and later a television personality. His career included almost every role in the sport, including player, trade union leader, coach, manager, director, chairman, television executive, presenter, pundit, analyst and assistant referee.

Hill began his playing career at Brentford in 1949 and moved to Fulham three years later. As chairman of the Professional Footballers' Association, he successfully campaigned for the abolition of the Football League's maximum wage in 1961. After retiring as a player, he took over as manager of Coventry City, modernising the team's image and guiding them from the Third Division to the First. In 1967, he began a career in football broadcasting, and from 1973 to 1988 was host of the BBC's Match of the Day.

== Early life ==
Hill was born in Balham, London, the son of William Thomas Hill, a World War I veteran, milkman, and bread delivery worker and Alice Beatrice Hill (née Wyatt). He was a pupil at Henry Thornton Grammar School, Clapham (1939–45), and later became President of the Old Boys' Association. He completed his national service as a clerk in the Royal Army Service Corps in which he attained the rank of Corporal and was considered a potential candidate for officer training.

== Football playing career ==
Hill first came into football as a fan, regularly watching football at local club Crystal Palace. During his national service, Hill played three trial games for Folkestone Town before suffering a serious cartilage injury. However, he was recommended to Reading who he joined as an amateur, playing mainly for their third team before being told they would not offer him a professional contract.

In 1949, Hill joined Brentford, making 87 appearances before moving to Fulham in March 1952, for whom he played nearly 300 games, scoring 52 goals. He set a club record by scoring five goals for Fulham in an away match against Doncaster Rovers in 1958 and was part of the team that gained promotion to the First Division. In 1957, he became chairman of the Professional Footballers' Association (PFA) and campaigned to have the Football League's £20 maximum wage scrapped, which he achieved in January 1961, when Fulham teammate Johnny Haynes became the first £100-a-week player. He was one of many signatories of a letter to The Times on 17 July 1958 opposing "the policy of apartheid" in international sport and defending "the principle of racial equality which is embodied in the Declaration of the Olympic Games".

== Football management ==
In November 1961, after retiring as a player aged 33, Hill became manager of Coventry City. His time at Coventry was marked by great changes to the club, nicknamed "The Sky Blue Revolution". He changed the home kit's colours to sky blue, coining the nickname "The Sky Blues". Alongside journalist and club director John Camkin, he also penned the club song "The Sky Blue Song", sung to the tune of the "Eton Boating Song".

Among his other innovations (many originally dismissed as "gimmicks" but later adopted by other clubs across Britain) were the first fully fledged match programme in English football, chartered trains to away games, regular "pop and crisps" parties where young fans could meet players and get autographs, the first "club call" line, souvenir merchandise made available through the post, and a variety of pre-match entertainment to encourage fans to arrive early. His partnership with the chairman, Derrick Robins, also led to a redevelopment of the stadium, Highfield Road, with two new stands and extensive social facilities being built. After winning the Third Division title in 1963–64 and the Second Division title in 1966–67, Hill left the club shortly before the start of the 1967–68 season as they entered the First Division for the first time.

At approximately 2am on the 27^{th} of February 1964, Hill was kidnapped by 6 students from Coventry Technical College as part of their rag week fundraising efforts. The students informed the police that he was not in danger, and he wrote a note which was forwarded onto Coventry City in preparation for the upcoming Saturday's match with Bournemouth and Boscombe Athletic. He was released after 36 hours, in time for the match, which was a 2-2 draw.

== Television career ==
After leaving Coventry in 1967, Hill moved into broadcasting, acting as technical adviser to the BBC's football-based drama series United! before becoming Head of Sport at London's co-ITV region, London Weekend Television, from 1968 to 1972. He also co-hosted their 1970 World Cup coverage which, at his suggestion, used the first panel of football pundits.

Along with his role in the abolition of the £20 per week maximum wage for players in English football in 1961, Hill was also instrumental in two other big rule changes in English football. The first of these was in August 1976, when the Football League agreed to Hill's suggestion to replace goal average with goal difference, with Hill explaining that goal average over the decades had favoured fewer goals conceded over more goals scored, which he believed should not be the case, with goal difference a way to ensure that more goals scored would be more rewarded over fewer goals conceded. Five years later in August 1981, the Football League agreed to Hill's suggestion of introducing three points for winning a match instead of two, with Hill saying that three points for a win would encourage teams to go for the win more rather than settle for a draw, with a win worth three times what a draw was worth instead of two times what a draw was worth.

Hill was briefly LWT's Deputy Controller of Programmes, before joining the BBC to present Match of the Day. Hill made 600 appearances on the show, and became a television icon, instantly recognisable and often caricatured for his long chin and distinctive beard. As a presenter or analyst, he worked on every major international championship from 1966 to 1998. As a broadcaster with the BBC, he was present at the Hillsborough disaster in 1989 whilst covering the game for Match of the Day. In 1999, Hill moved from the BBC to Sky Sports, where he featured on Jimmy Hill's Sunday Supplement, a weekly discussion show between Hill and three football journalists. In 2007, he was replaced by his co-presenter Brian Woolnough and the programme was renamed Sunday Supplement.

In 2004, Hill defended fellow pundit Ron Atkinson over racist comments Atkinson had made, believing his microphone was off, which were broadcast live in the Middle East. Hill was asked whether he thought Atkinson should resign for describing a Chelsea player as a "lazy, fucking thick nigger", to which he said it was the "language of the football field". Hill went on to say: "In that context, you wouldn't think that words like nigger were particularly insulting: it would be funny. Without meaning to insult any black men, it's us having fun ... I mean, nigger is black – so we have jokes where we call them niggers because they're black. Why should that be any more of an offence than someone calling me chinny?" (Hill, famously, had a prominent chin). Hill's comments were described as "mind-boggling" by the then director of Kick it Out, football's anti-racism group. He went on to say: "Jimmy Hill's comments are as offensive as Ron Atkinson's".

== Directorships ==
Despite his departure as manager in 1967, Hill returned to Coventry City as managing director in April 1975 before becoming the chairman. When Coventry played their last match at Highfield Road in 2005, Hill received a post-match hero's welcome from the capacity crowd and led them in a rousing chorus of "The Sky Blue Song". In 2007, fans voted for a bar at the new Ricoh Arena to be named "Jimmy's" in his honour. Following a spell as chairman of Charlton Athletic, Hill made a return to Fulham in 1987 to become chairman, helping his old club survive near-bankruptcy and blocking an attempted merger with Queens Park Rangers. Hill was a trustee of the Stable Lads' Association, and a patron of Labrador Rescue South East and Central.

== Coventry vs Bristol City controversy ==
As chairman, at a crucial relegation match at home to Bristol City at the end of the 1976–77 season, Hill was advised to delay the kick off by ten minutes for fans still outside caught in the heavy traffic. Relegation rivals Sunderland, playing at Everton, kicked off on time, Sunderland eventually losing the game 2–0. The Sunderland result was announced over the PA at Highfield Road, reportedly at Hill's insistence, and Coventry City and Bristol City played out the last ten minutes of the game apparently without any intent to attack each other's half, thereby ensuring that both avoided relegation. (Coventry's game with Bristol City stood at 2–2, and a goal for either team would have led to the other side being relegated and Sunderland staying up.) A Football League inquiry was held subsequently, but the result stood. Sunderland fans had still not forgotten the incident more than thirty years later; in 2008 they gave Hill a hostile reception when he appeared near the Sunderland end during a match against Fulham.

== Personal life ==
Hill married three times, having three children by his first wife, Gloria, and two by his second, Heather. Hill published his autobiography, The Jimmy Hill Story, in 1998. He also wrote Striking for Soccer in 1963 and Tips from the Top, a football coaching book, in 1970. In September 2013 it was revealed that he had been diagnosed with Alzheimer's disease in 2008. His children by his second wife expressed concern that they had no role in determining his care, as Hill had assigned power of attorney in 2005 to his third wife, Bryony, and a solicitor. Bryony Hill published a memoir in 2015, My Gentleman Jim, detailing her husband's illness.

Hill died on 19 December 2015, aged 87. A celebration of Hill's life took place at Coventry Cathedral on 12 February 2016. Hill was the president of non-league team Corinthian Casuals. He lived in Hurstpierpoint, West Sussex. Hill is credited with writing the words to Arsenal's 1971 Top 10 hit "Good Old Arsenal".

== Statue ==
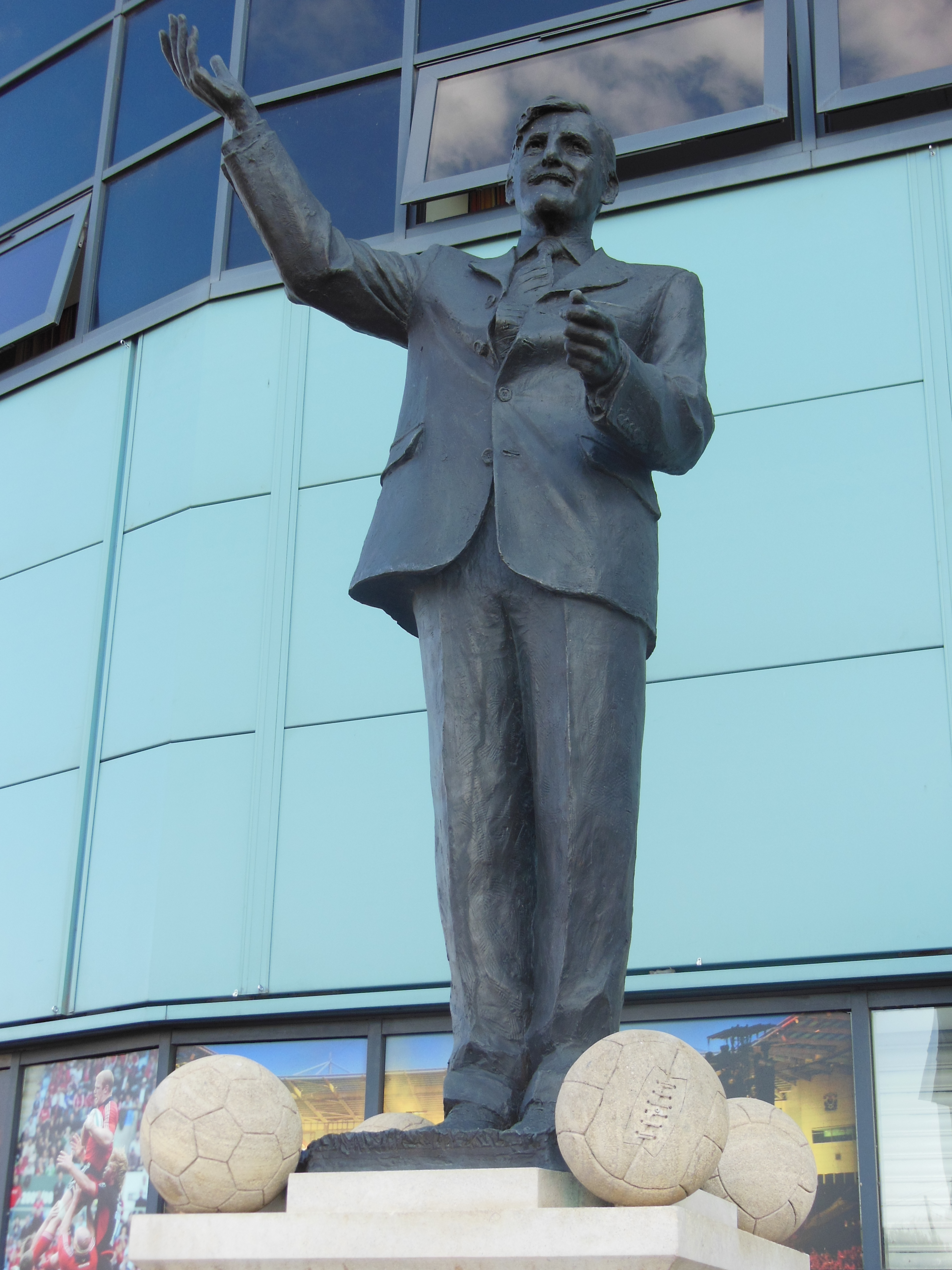
The statue of Hill outside Coventry's Ricoh Arena

Sculptor Nicholas Dimbleby was commissioned to build a statue of Hill at a cost of £100,000. The statue is at Coventry's Ricoh Arena ground and was unveiled by Hill himself on 28 July 2011. The money to build the statue was raised from public donations. Other former Coventry City players from Hill's six-year term as manager were there for the unveiling ceremony, including Bobby Gould, John Sillett and George Curtis, all of whom went on to manage the club during the 1980s.

== Footballing legacy and public image ==
Hill had a reputation as a moderniser and all-round innovator in football: as well as helping abolish the players' maximum wage, he commissioned the first English all-seater stadium at Highfield Road, lifted a ban on media interviews, introduced the first electronic scoreboard in 1964, the first colour matchday programme and in 1965 Coventry were the first club to show a live match via CCTV on four giant screens. He has been credited with the introduction of the three points for a win system, pioneered by The Football Association in 1981. He was also credited with the idea of using a panel of football pundits for the 1970 World Cup.

While long regarded as a cornerstone of televised football in England, Hill was often held in disdain by Scottish football fans, who regularly sang derisory songs about him. Seen by them as being belittling and dismissive about Scottish football, Hill said in 1982 in an interview with the Glasgow Evening Times, "In no way am I anti-Scots, although I know that's how I'm looked on. I think that as a nation you need somebody to hate, and I seem to fit the bill pretty well."

In 1972, Arsenal were hosting Liverpool at Highbury on 16 September, when linesman Dennis Drewitt pulled a muscle and was unable to continue. FA rules state that the match could not be completed without a referee and two linesmen, so the game was in danger of being abandoned. The matchday announcer put a message over the loudspeaker asking if anyone was a qualified referee and would volunteer to run the line. Hill was a qualified referee and had been at Highbury that day as a spectator. He quickly donned a tracksuit before stepping in for the injured Drewitt.

== Memorial garden ==
A garden in Hill's honour was opened in 2006 outside Coventry City's Ricoh Arena. A new memorial garden twice the size of the old was revealed on 30 April 2016 before the game against Sheffield United.

== Honours ==
=== 1995 New Year Honours ===
- Awarded an Order of the British Empire for services to Association Football and to Broadcasting in the 1995 New Year Honours.

=== As a manager ===
==== Coventry City ====
- Third Division: 1963–64
- Second Division: 1966–67

== Managerial statistics ==
Managerial record by team and tenure
Team	From	To	Record					Ref
Team	From	To	P	W	D	L	Win %	Ref
Coventry City	1 November 1961	30 September 1967	290	129	83	78	44.5	
Total			290	129	83	78	44.5	—

== Bibliography ==
- Brown, Geoff and Hogsbjerg, Christian. Apartheid is not a Game: Remembering the Stop the Seventy Tour campaign. London: Redwords, 2020. ISBN 9781912926589.
- Hill, Jimmy. The Jimmy Hill Story. London: Coronet, 1999. ISBN 9780340717769.
