= Terrace (stadium) =

Traditional standing area of a sports stadium

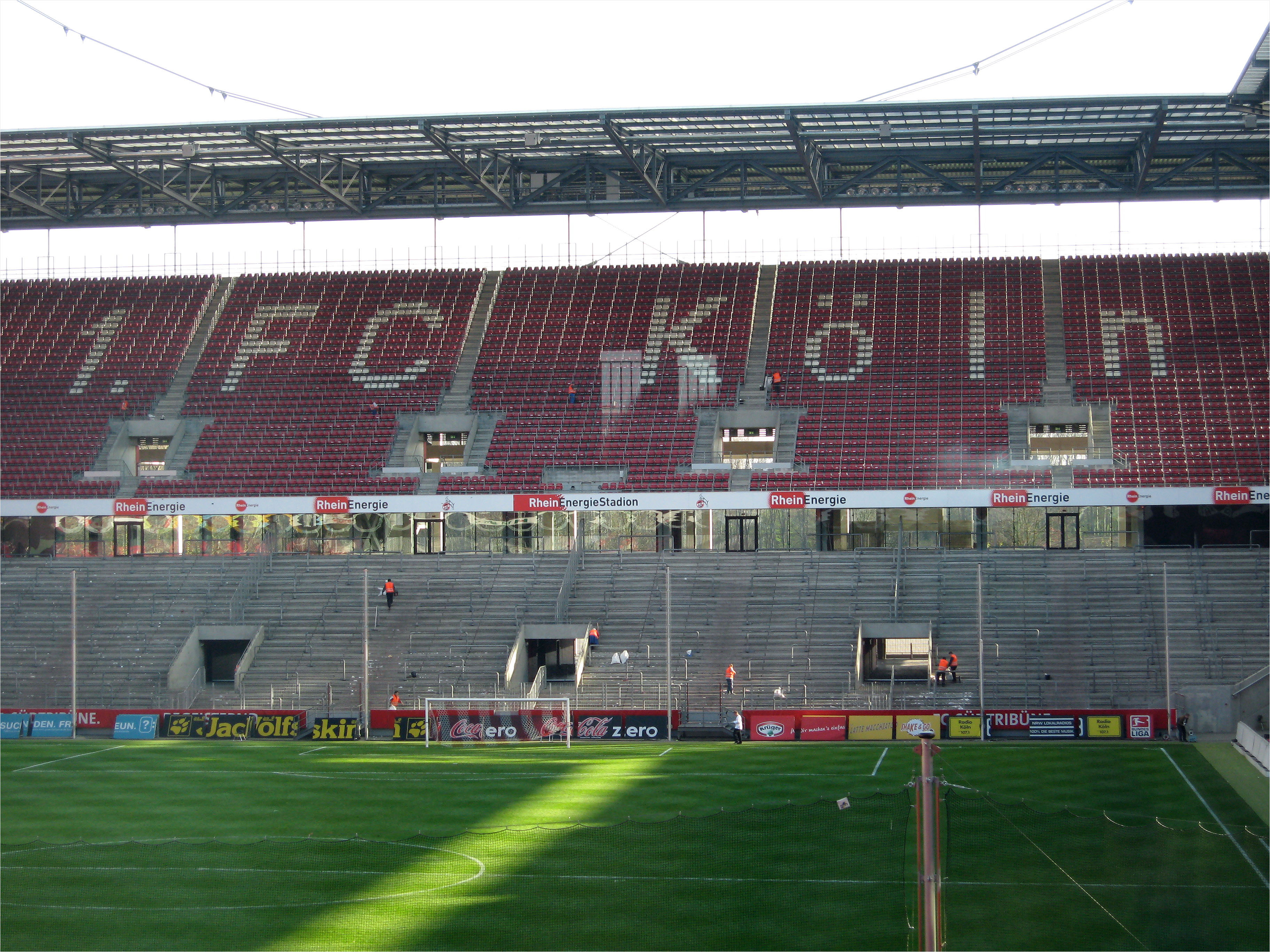
Terracing at the bottom and seating at the top of a stand at the RheinEnergieStadion in Germany, home of Bundesliga club 1. FC Köln

A terrace or terracing in sporting terms refers to the standing area of a sports stadium, particularly in the United Kingdom and Republic of Ireland. It is a series of concrete steps, with intermittent safety barriers installed at specific locations to prevent an excessive movement of people down its slope.

Terraces carry particular importance in football stadiums, where they have tended to be located in the areas behind the two goals as a cheaper alternative to sitting in the stands which were traditionally located at the sides of the field. As standing on the terraces was cheaper and provided a greater degree of freedom to move and congregate with fellow supporters, over the decades of the 20th century they became the most popular areas for younger working class men and teenage boys to watch the games.

After the Hillsborough disaster and subsequent Taylor report, terraces were banned from football grounds in the top two divisions in England. The report stated that standing areas were not intrinsically unsafe and laid the majority of the blame for the disaster with the police and the stadium itself. Despite that finding, the report made a number of recommendations for the future of football in England including a conversion to all-seater venues which provided a basis for the government ban on terracing. In the 1990s, UEFA banned standing areas for games in its competitions which led to the removal of terraces from many stadiums around Europe, including the Bernabéu and the Estádio da Luz.

There is currently a growing demand for the introduction of a hybrid model of terracing/seating to the top divisions of English football, based on several different stadium designs in Germany and other European countries, dubbed "safe standing" areas. Genuine terraces continue to be built in modern Irish stadiums such as Hill 16 in Croke Park, Thomond Park and the redeveloped Páirc Uí Chaoimh.

== Germany ==
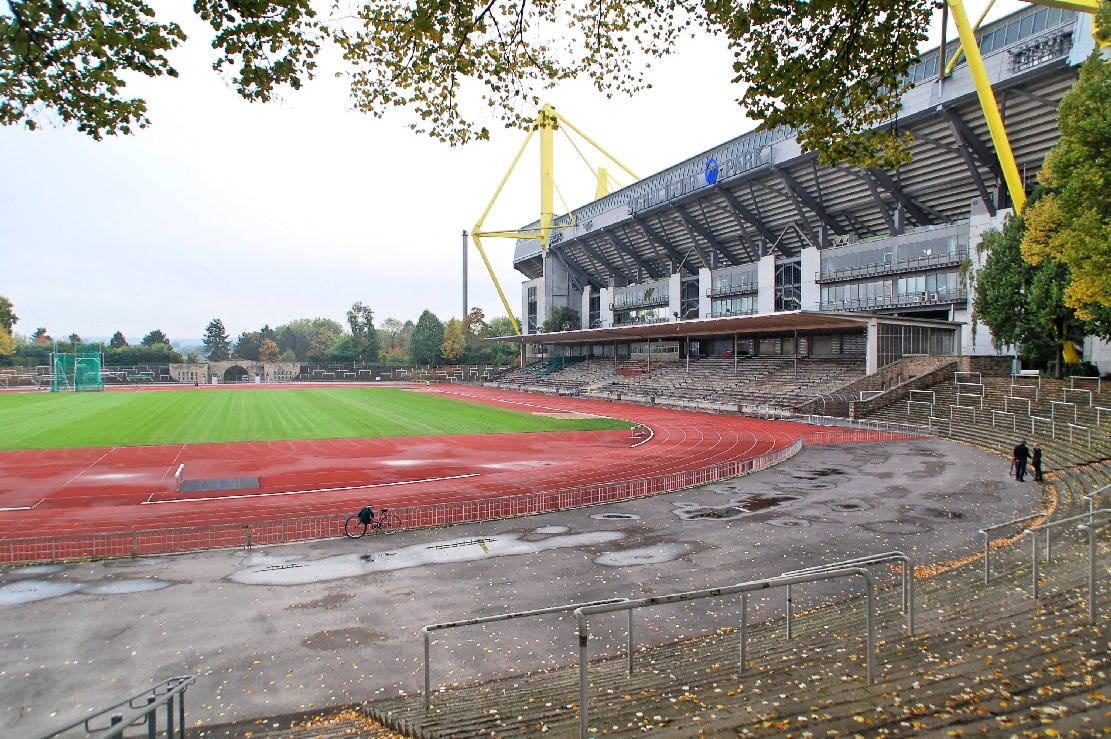
The Stadion Rote Erde, home of Borussia Dortmund from 1937 to 1974. The Westfalenstadion situated beside it features the largest terrace in Europe.

Terracing was common in German football stadiums through most of the 20th century and, in contrast to other major football nations in Europe, has remained so into the 21st century. Despite UEFA's ban on standing areas for European matches, clubs in Germany refused to permanently remove the terraces from their grounds and maintained their presence in domestic football.

== Republic of Ireland ==
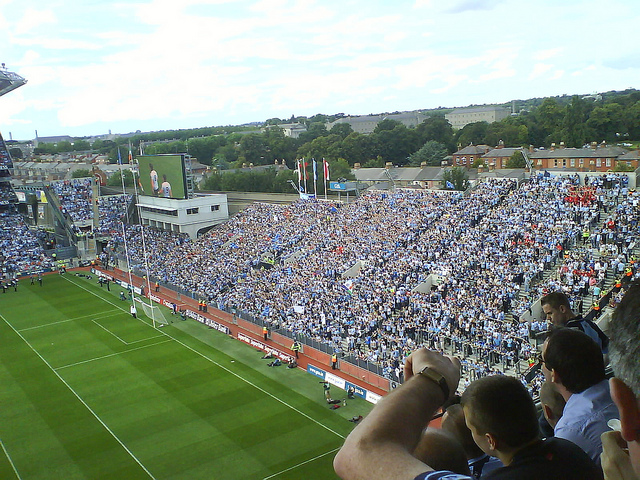
Hill 16 in Croke Park, a modern terrace built in 2004 to replace the old terrace and Nally Stand

In Ireland, terraces remain a common feature in stadiums hosting Gaelic games, rugby union, association football and other sports.

GAA stadiums that feature terracing include Fitzgerald Stadium in Killarney, Pearse Stadium in Galway and Páirc Uí Chaoimh in Cork. Hill 16 in Croke Park is the biggest terrace in Ireland.

Terracing has been common in rugby stadiums for decades and continues to be included in modern redevelopments of major grounds like Thomond Park and Ravenhill Stadium.

League of Ireland grounds have historically been dominated by terracing, with major stadiums like Dalymount Park and Glenmalure Park featuring at least three sides of terracing for much of their existence. The redevelopment of Tolka Park in the early 1990s reflected the wider move away from terracing to seating in European football stadiums, though terraces were retained in many grounds that underwent a degree of redevelopment.

== United Kingdom ==
=== History ===
In the early days of the twentieth century the terraces were simply earth banks, often built up with the rubble of construction sites. Rows of railways sleepers were laid on top to provide something solid for spectators to stand on.

Most stadiums in Britain at the turn of the century had stands for spectators, but when a wooden stand at Ibrox Park collapsed in the 1902 Ibrox disaster, killing many spectators during a Scotland versus England game, there was an instant ban on framework supported terraces, which the government ordered must be replaced by solid earthwork supported terracing.

The earth and sleeper terraces would gradually make way for concrete terraces, with metal crush barriers being erected at various points to prevent crushing. An example of one such old style terrace can be found at Cathkin Park in Glasgow, an abandoned football stadium, which was home to Queen's Park F.C.

=== Popularity ===
The terraces were hugely popular in England, particularly from the 1920s to the 1980s, and their working class links led them to be given affectionate names by the fans who stood on them. By far the most common name was Spion Kop, named after the Battle of Spion Kop in the Boer War in South Africa in 1902 between Britain and the Boers. Arsenal F.C. were the first to adopt such a name but by far the most famous was the Kop at Liverpool F.C.'s Anfield Road ground. The vast majority of clubs in England and farther afield would go on to regard their most popular end of their stadium as a Kop, even if, in most cases the end had another name, for example the Holte End at Aston Villa F.C.'s Villa Park. The most notable exception to this is Everton F.C., whose close rivalry with city neighbours Liverpool has meant that neither the club nor its fans would ever refer to the ground as having a Kop section.

The advantage of terracing over seating for clubs was obvious, as many more fans could be packed in tightly into very cramped areas, and it is no coincidence that many clubs' all-time attendance records were set in the 1930s and 1940s.

=== Safety ===
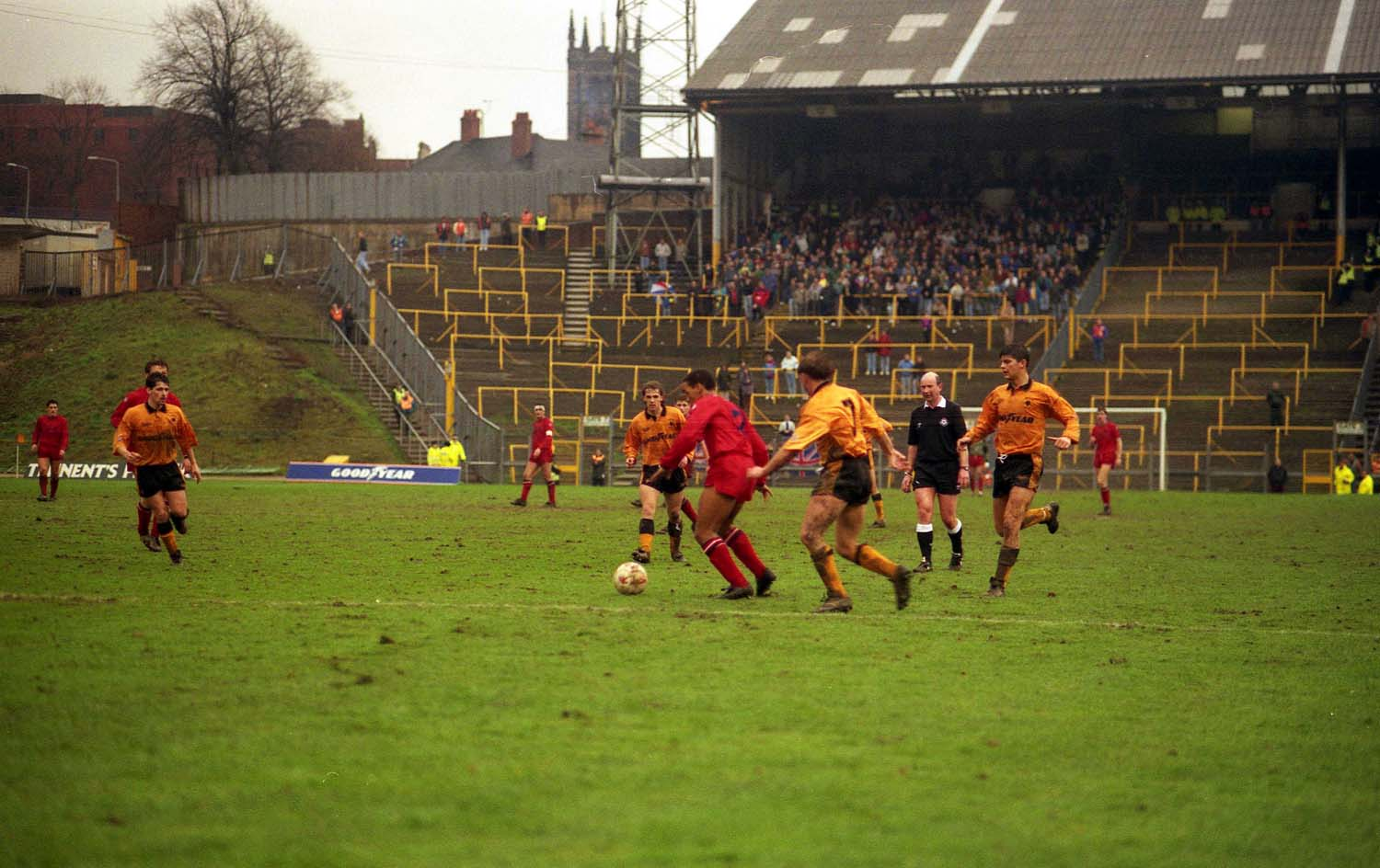
The South Bank terrace at Molineux

Terraces were generally a safe, cheap and enjoyable way to watch sport, but on occasion they could be dangerous too.

In the early days the wet railway sleepers would often lead to falls, which quickly led to their replacement but much worse was to follow when thirty-three people lost their lives in 1946 when an overcrowded terrace led to a crush at Bolton Wanderers F.C.'s Burnden Park ground. That such a disaster only occurred once during this era is amazing as it was common in those days to see a fainted fan being passed down the terraces over the heads of those packed in so they could be treated for their ill effects. But there were perhaps more advantages than disadvantages still. The ground fee was low and achievable for all, the singing and cheering was not rarely astonishing, especially where the huge covered Goal Stands existed. Like the Kop at Anfield Road, Holte End at Villa Park and South Bank Stand at Molineux Ground

By the 1970s the lower cost of travel meant it was easier for fans to have away days, or road trips and a common practice among young visiting fans was to try to "take the terrace". Large bodies of supporters of the visiting team would infiltrate the popular terracing of the home supporters with the result that violence often erupted. This led to crowd segregation at football grounds and also played a small part in the erection of high fencing and segregated pens within most terraces in England.

These pens became a contributing factor in the Hillsborough disaster, England's worst ever stadium disaster, when too many fans entered the central pens at the Hillsborough Stadium in Sheffield. 97 Liverpool fans were crushed to death against the perimeter fence in the resultant crush.

Although claiming that terraces were not "intrinsically unsafe", the final Taylor Report into the disaster led to a recommendation that terraces be done away with at major British stadiums. Today every major British football ground is all-seater, though terracing is still found at grounds in the lower leagues, and in grounds of both rugby codes, such as the famous 'Shed' at Kingsholm, Gloucester and the South Stand at Leeds Rhinos' Headingley Stadium, which both run down one side of the pitch. Britain's biggest remaining terraced ground is Brunton Park in Carlisle, which still has three sides of terracing.

=== Crowd disorder ===
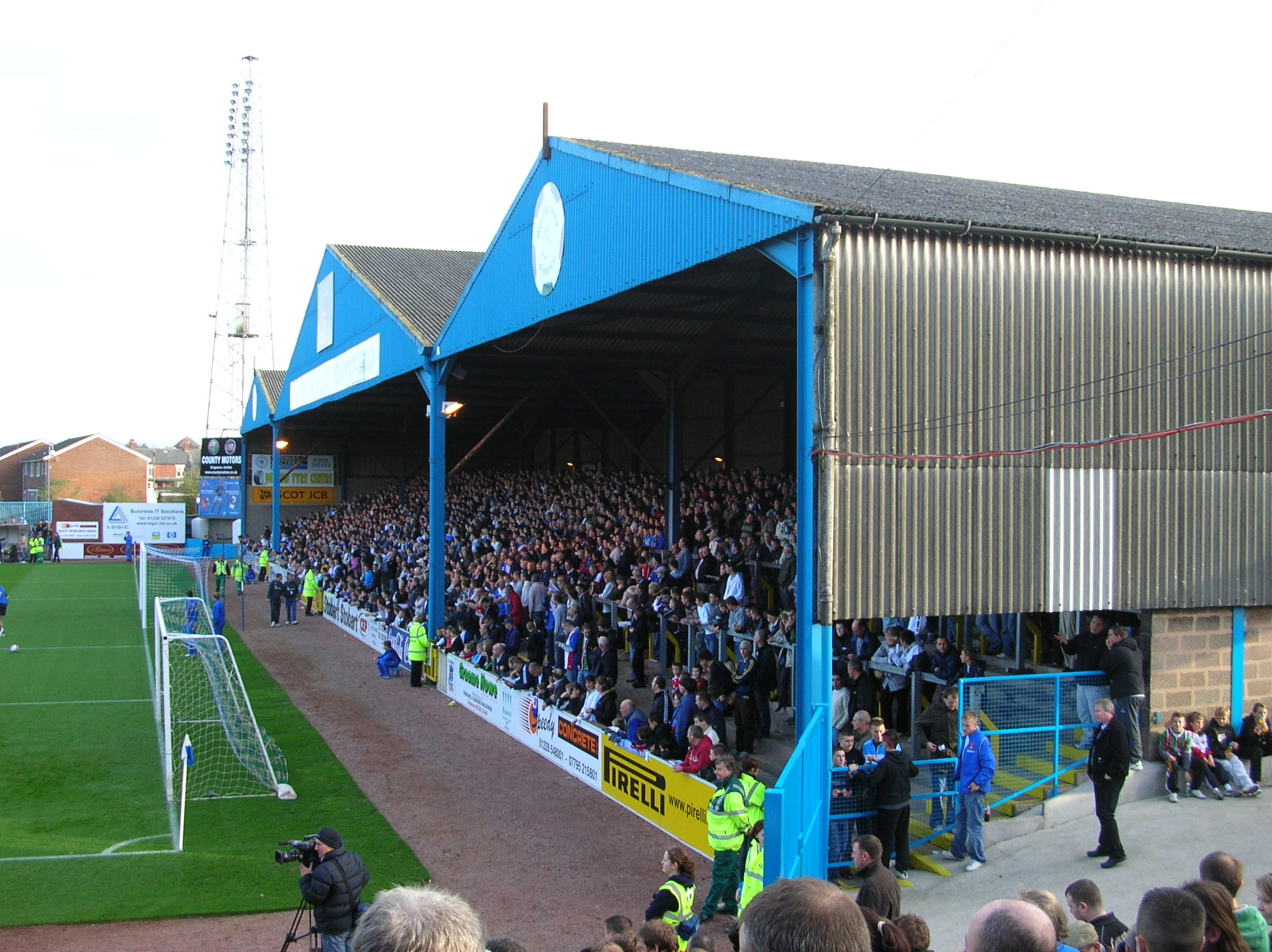
The Warwick Road End, a covered terrace at Brunton Park, home of Carlisle United F.C.

It has been argued that terraces encourage crowd disorder. However, analysis of statistics on football related arrests and banning orders published by the UK Home Office show that in both the 2008–09 and 2009–10 seasons the rate of arrest per 100,000 supporters was higher at Football League One and Football League Two clubs with all-seated grounds than at those with terraces. Overall arrest rates for football related offences have fallen steadily from 34 per 100,000 in 1988–89 to 9 per 100,000 in 2009–10, however the trend of reducing arrests started before stadia were required to become all-seated and has continued since.

=== Safe standing ===
In 2011 the Scottish Premier League announced that their clubs would be given permission to introduce safe standing areas at their grounds. In 2012, Derby County became the first club from the Championship to support the introduction of safe standing areas, although the only terraced standing areas in the Championship and/or Barclays Premiership at that time could be found at London Road, home to Peterborough United. Peterborough United became the second Championship club to back the safe standing campaign through their CEO Bob Symns. Symns also signed the safe standing petition. The club's mascot – Peter Burrow – took part in a video campaign promoting safe standing, with the video being shot at the AWD-Arena, home to Hannover 96 in Germany

== United States ==
Terracing was introduced to American football with the inclusion of party decks with the ability to hold 35,000 people at Cowboys Stadium in the Dallas suburb of Arlington, Texas. Capacity for Dallas Cowboys games and other American football events is 80,000 seated, expandable to 111,000 with standing areas. However, these decks are flat, rather than steeply pitched, and are more analogous to standing-room only ticketing where obstruction is expected. The key difference is that unlike at European grounds, party decks are not considered or marketed as areas from which all spectators are afforded a view of the match at all times.

Many seats in FedExField, home of the Washington Commanders, have been removed in favour of terraced party decks. These terraced, standing-room-only sections are similar to safe standing sections in European stadiums, though they are not marketed as such.

Since the 2010s, several Major League Soccer stadiums have opened with or renovated for safe standing. The San Jose Earthquakes opened a Supporters Terrace at Earthquakes Stadium in 2014 with a capacity of 600 people, and was followed by a large-scale safe standing section at Orlando's Exploria Stadium, which opened in 2017. Since then, BMO Stadium (LAFC), Allianz Field (Minnesota United FC), Audi Field (DC United), TQL Stadium (FC Cincinnati), ScottsMiracle-Gro Field (Columbus Crew), and Q2 Stadium (Austin FC) have opened with safe standing; two existing stadiums, Sports Illustrated Stadium (New York Red Bulls) and Dignity Health Sports Park (LA Galaxy), were also remodeled to support safe standing, as well as Al Lang Stadium (Tampa Bay Rowdies) of the (USL).

== See also ==
- List of English Football League and Conference stadiums with terracing
- Bleacher
