= 2002–03 Coventry City F.C. season =

Coventry City
2002–03 season
- Chairman: Mike McGinnity
- Manager: Gary McAllister (player-manager)
- Stadium: Highfield Road
- First Division: 20th
- FA Cup: Fourth round
- League Cup: Third round
- Top goalscorer: League: Bothroyd (8); All: Bothroyd (11)
- Average home league attendance: 14,813

During the 2002–03 English football season, Coventry City F.C. competed in the Football League First Division. It was the club's second consecutive season at that level.

== Season summary ==
In the 2002–03 season, midway through the campaign, McAllister's men still stood a good chance of making the division One play-offs, but they won only one league game after the turn of 2003 and finished 20th in the final table - just two places above the relegation zone.

== Final league table ==
Pos	Team	Pld	W	D	L	GF	GA	GD	Pts	Promotion or relegation
18	Derby County	46	15	7	24	55	74	−19	52	
19	Bradford City	46	14	10	22	51	73	−22	52	
20	Coventry City	46	12	14	20	46	62	−16	50	
21	Stoke City	46	12	14	20	45	69	−24	50	
22	Sheffield Wednesday (R)	46	10	16	20	56	73	−17	46	Relegation to 2003–04 Second Division

Updated to match(es) played on 11 May 2003. Source: Soccerway
Rules for classification: 1) points; 2) goal difference; 3) number of goals scored.
(R) Relegated

== Results ==
Coventry City's score comes first

=== Legend ===
Win	Draw	Loss

=== Football League First Division ===
Date	Opponent	Venue	Result	Attendance	Scorers
10 August 2002	Sheffield United	H	2–1	18,839	Bothroyd, McSheffrey
13 August 2002	Brighton & Hove Albion	A	0–0	6,816	
17 August 2002	Reading	A	2–1	14,712	Davenport, Bothroyd
24 August 2002	Crystal Palace	H	1–0	15,526	Hughes (pen)
26 August 2002	Watford	A	2–5	11,136	McSheffrey, Eustace
31 August 2002	Nottingham Forest	H	0–1	13,732	
14 September 2002	Grimsby Town	H	3–2	12,403	Mills, McSheffrey (pen), Bothroyd
18 September 2002	Sheffield Wednesday	H	1–1	14,178	Normann
21 September 2002	Wimbledon	A	1–0	2,077	McAllister (pen)
24 September 2002	Bradford City	A	1–1	11,655	Bothroyd
28 September 2002	Millwall	H	2–3	13,562	McSheffrey, Mills
5 October 2002	Gillingham	A	2–0	7,722	Bothroyd, Pipe
19 October 2002	Portsmouth	A	1–1	18,837	Davenport
23 October 2002	Norwich City	H	1–1	16,409	Partridge
26 October 2002	Walsall	H	0–0	14,544	
29 October 2002	Leicester City	A	1–2	27,139	Partridge
2 November 2002	Rotherham United	H	2–1	13,179	McAllister (2)
9 November 2002	Burnley	A	1–3	13,470	McAllister (pen)
16 November 2002	Wolverhampton Wanderers	H	0–2	18,998	
23 November 2002	Ipswich Town	A	1–2	23,633	Eustace
30 November 2002	Preston North End	H	1–2	13,313	Davenport
7 December 2002	Stoke City	A	2–1	12,760	Bothroyd (2)
14 December 2002	Wolverhampton Wanderers	A	2–0	25,577	McAllister, Partridge
21 December 2002	Derby County	H	3–0	13,185	McAllister, Hignett, Bothroyd
26 December 2002	Reading	H	2–0	19,526	Hignett, Partridge
28 December 2002	Sheffield United	A	0–0	20,465	
1 January 2003	Crystal Palace	A	1–1	17,362	McSheffrey
11 January 2003	Brighton & Hove Albion	H	0–0	15,951	
18 January 2003	Nottingham Forest	A	1–1	24,487	Sara
1 February 2003	Watford	H	0–1	17,393	
8 February 2003	Burnley	H	0–1	13,659	
15 February 2003	Rotherham United	A	0–1	6,524	
22 February 2003	Bradford City	H	0–2	12,525	
1 March 2003	Grimsby Town	A	2–0	5,736	Ford (own goal), Eustace (pen)
5 March 2003	Sheffield Wednesday	A	1–5	19,536	Joachim
8 March 2003	Wimbledon	H	2–2	11,796	Eustace, Joachim
15 March 2003	Norwich City	A	0–2	20,099	
19 March 2003	Portsmouth	H	0–4	13,922	
22 March 2003	Leicester City	H	1–2	16,610	Jansen
5 April 2003	Preston North End	A	2–2	13,026	Pead, Pipe
12 April 2003	Ipswich Town	H	2–4	13,968	Jansen, Gordon
15 April 2003	Walsall	A	0–0	7,337	
19 April 2003	Derby County	A	0–1	23,921	
21 April 2003	Stoke City	H	0–1	12,675	
26 April 2003	Gillingham	H	0–0	14,795	
4 May 2003	Millwall	A	0–2	9,220	

=== FA Cup ===
Round	Date	Opponent	Venue	Result	Attendance	Goalscorers
R3	4 January 2003	Cardiff City	A	2–2	16,013	Mills, McAllister (pen)
R3R	15 January 2003	Cardiff City	H	3–0	11,997	Fowler, Holdsworth, Bothroyd
R4	25 January 2003	Rochdale	A	0–2	9,156	

=== League Cup ===
Round	Date	Opponent	Venue	Result	Attendance	Goalscorers
R1	11 September 2002	Colchester United	H	3–0	6,075	McSheffrey, McAllister, Mills
R2	2 October 2002	Rushden & Diamonds	H	8–0	8,570	McSheffrey (3), Mills (2), Bothroyd (2), Betts (pen)
R3	6 November 2002	Crystal Palace	A	0–3	8,102	

== First-team squad ==
Squad at end of season

Note: Flags indicate national team as defined under FIFA eligibility rules; some limited exceptions apply. Players may hold more than one non-FIFA nationality.

No.	Pos.	Nation	Player
2	DF	ENG	Craig Pead
3	DF	ENG	Dean Gordon
4	DF	BIH	Muhamed Konjić
5	DF	ENG	Richard Shaw
6	MF	ENG	John Eustace
8	FW	ENG	Julian Joachim
9	FW	ENG	Matt Jansen (on loan from Blackburn Rovers)
10	MF	SCO	Gary McAllister (player-manager)
11	FW	MAR	Youssef Chippo
13	GK	FRA	Fabien Debec
14	MF	IRL	Barry Quinn
15	MF	MAR	Youssef Safri
17	MF	ENG	Tom Bates
18	FW	NIR	Ben Mackey
19	FW	ENG	Gary McSheffrey
20	MF	SCO	Gary Caldwell (on loan from Newcastle United)
21	FW	ENG	Jay Bothroyd

No.	Pos.	Nation	Player
22	MF	WAL	Lee Fowler
23	GK	DEN	Morten Hyldgaard
24	FW	ARG	Juan Sara (on loan from Dundee)
25	MF	ANG	Christian Yulu
26	MF	ENG	Robert Betts
27	MF	ESP	Vicente Engonga
28	DF	ENG	Calum Davenport
30	MF	ENG	Mark Noon
32	FW	ENG	Avun Jephcott
33	GK	ENG	Gary Montgomery
34	MF	WAL	David Pipe
35	MF	ENG	Eddie Stanford
37	DF	IRL	Sean Cooney
39	MF	ENG	Isaac Osbourne
40	DF	ENG	Andy Whing

== Transfers ==
=== Transfers in ===
Player	From	Date	Fee	Ref.
(England) Tom Bates		20 Feb 2003	Free	

=== Transfers out ===
Note: Flags indicate national team as defined under FIFA eligibility rules; some limited exceptions apply. Players may hold more than one non-FIFA nationality.

No.	Pos.	Nation	Player
9	FW	ENG	Lee Hughes (to West Bromwich Albion)
7	MF	ENG	David Thompson (to Blackburn Rovers)
17	DF	ENG	Steve Walsh (to Tamworth)
25	MF	NOR	Runar Normann (to SK Brann)
32	DF	HON	Iván Guerrero (to C.D. Motagua)
30	FW	HON	Jairo Martínez (to C.D. Motagua)
24	MF	BEL	Laurent Delorge (to Lierse SK)
17	MF	SCO	Brian Kerr (to Newcastle United)
25	MF	ENG	Jamie McMaster (on loan from Leeds United)

No.	Pos.	Nation	Player
30	GK	ENG	Ben Williams (on loan from Manchester United)
9	FW	ENG	Craig Hignett (on loan from Blackburn Rovers)
27	MF	ITA	Marco Brancati (released)
12	FW	ENG	Lee Mills (to Stoke City)
18	MF	SCO	Gavin Strachan (to Peterborough United)
17	FW	ENG	Dean Holdsworth (to Rushden & Diamonds)
7	MF	IRL	Richie Partridge (on loan from Liverpool)
29	FW	ITA	Antonio Gallieri (released)

== Reserve squad ==
Note: Flags indicate national team as defined under FIFA eligibility rules; some limited exceptions apply. Players may hold more than one non-FIFA nationality.

No.	Pos.	Nation	Player
16	MF	IRL	Keith O'Neill
29	GK	ENG	Richard Brush
31	MF	SCO	Brian Ford
36	DF	ENG	Kirk Miller
38	MF	ENG	Andrew Hall

== Statistics ==
=== Appearances and goals ===
No.	Pos	Nat	Player	Total		1st Division		FA Cup		League Cup	
No.	Pos	Nat	Player	Apps	Goals	Apps	Goals	Apps	Goals	Apps	Goals
Goalkeepers
13	GK	(France) FRA	Fabien Debec	13	0	11	0	0	0	2	0
23	GK	(Denmark) DEN	Morten Hyldgaard	31	0	27	0	3	0	1	0
33	GK	(England) ENG	Gary Montgomery	8	0	8	0	0	0	0	0
Defenders
2	DF	(England) ENG	Craig Pead	26	1	17+7	1	2	0	0	0
3	DF	(England) ENG	Dean Gordon	35	1	30	1	3	0	2	0
4	DF	(Bosnia and Herzegovina) BIH	Muhamed Konjić	48	0	42	0	3	0	3	0
5	DF	(England) ENG	Richard Shaw	33	0	27+2	0	2	0	1+1	0
14	DF	(Republic of Ireland) IRL	Barry Quinn	19	0	13+5	0	0	0	1	0
20	DF	(Scotland) SCO	Gary Caldwell	41	0	36	0	2	0	3	0
28	DF	(England) ENG	Calum Davenport	37	3	26+6	3	2+1	0	2	0
37	DF	(Republic of Ireland) IRL	Sean Cooney	1	0	0+1	0	0	0	0	0
40	DF	(England) ENG	Andy Whing	14	0	13+1	0	0	0	0	0
Midfielders
6	MF	(England) ENG	John Eustace	35	4	23+9	4	1	0	1+1	0
10	MF	(Scotland) SCO	Gary McAllister	46	9	41	7	3	1	2	1
11	MF	(Morocco) MAR	Youssef Chippo	25	0	20+3	0	0	0	1+1	0
15	MF	(Morocco) MAR	Youssef Safri	29	0	24+3	0	0	0	2	0
17	MF	(England) ENG	Tom Bates	1	0	0+1	0	0	0	0	0
22	MF	(Wales) WAL	Lee Fowler	3	1	1	0	1+1	1	0	0
25	MF	(Angola) ANG	Christian Yulu	3	0	1+2	0	0	0	0	0
26	MF	(England) ENG	Robert Betts	4	1	1	0	1+1	0	1	1
27	MF	(Spain) ESP	Vicente Engonga	8	0	5+3	0	0	0	0	0
30	MF	(England) ENG	Mark Noon	2	0	0+2	0	0	0	0	0
34	MF	(Wales) WAL	David Pipe	24	2	11+10	2	0+1	0	1+1	0
35	MF	(England) ENG	Eddie Stanford	2	0	0+1	0	0	0	0+1	0
39	MF	(England) ENG	Isaac Osbourne	2	0	2	0	0	0	0	0
Forwards
8	FW	(England) ENG	Julian Joachim	11	2	10+1	2	0	0	0	0
9	FW	(England) ENG	Matt Jansen	9	2	8+1	2	0	0	0	0
18	FW	(Northern Ireland) NIR	Ben Mackey	3	0	0+3	0	0	0	0	0
19	FW	(England) ENG	Gary McSheffrey	33	8	14+15	4	1+1	0	2	4
21	FW	(England) ENG	Jay Bothroyd	39	11	24+9	8	3	1	0+3	2
24	FW	(Argentina) ARG	Juan Sara	4	1	1+2	1	0+1	0	0	0
32	FW	(England) ENG	Avun Jephcott	1	0	0+1	0	0	0	0	0
Players transferred or loaned out during the season
7	MF	(England) ENG	David Thompson	4	0	4	0	0	0	0	0
7	MF	(Republic of Ireland) IRL	Richie Partridge	31	4	23+4	4	2	0	2	0
9	FW	(England) ENG	Lee Hughes	4	1	3+1	1	0	0	0	0
9	FW	(England) ENG	Craig Hignett	9	2	7+1	2	0	0	1	0
12	FW	(England) ENG	Lee Mills	22	6	11+7	2	1	1	3	3
17	DF	(England) ENG	Steve Walsh	2	0	1+1	0	0	0	0	0
17	MF	(Scotland) SCO	Brian Kerr	4	0	2+1	0	0	0	1	0
17	FW	(England) ENG	Dean Holdsworth	20	1	13+4	0	3	1	0	0
18	MF	(Scotland) SCO	Gavin Strachan	1	0	0+1	0	0	0	0	0
24	MF	(Belgium) BEL	Laurent Delorge	3	0	2	0	0	0	1	0
25	FW	(Norway) NOR	Runar Normann	4	1	2+1	1	0	0	0+1	0
25	MF	(England) ENG	Jamie McMaster	2	0	2	0	0	0	0	0

Last updated: 31 June 2002
Source: Competitions
