= 2003–04 Coventry City F.C. season =

Coventry City F.C.
2003–04 season
- Manager: Gary McAllister (until 11 December); Eric Black (from 11 December to 3 May); Steven Ogrizovic (from 3 May)
- Stadium: Highfield Road
- First Division: 12th
- FA Cup: OUT v Colchester United; Fourth round replay
- League Cup: OUT v Tottenham Hotspur; Second round
- Top goalscorer: League: All: Gary McSheffrey (12)
- Highest home attendance: 22,195 (vs. Crystal Palace, 9 May) Cup: 15,474 (vs. Tottenham Hotspur 24 September)
- Lowest home attendance: 10,872 (vs. Wimbledon, 15 October) Cup: 8,280 (vs. Peterborough United, 13 August)
- Average home league attendance: 14,816

This is Coventry City Football Club progress in the 2003–04 season. This season the Sky Blues will play in the First Division and will feature in the FA Cup and the League Cup.

== Matches ==
=== First Division ===
16 August 2003 1	Coventry City	0–0	Walsall	Coventry
15:00 BST		report		Stadium: Highfield Road; Attendance: 15,377; Referee: Chris Foy

23 August 2003 2	Ipswich Town	1–1	Coventry City	Ipswich
15:00 BST	Bent 17'	report	Doyle 31'	Stadium: Portman Road; Attendance: 22,419; Referee: Frazer Stretton

27 August 2003 3	Coventry City	1–3	Nottingham Forest	Coventry
15:00 BST	Whing 46'	report	Reid 19', 61'; Johnson 65'	Stadium: Highfield Road; Attendance: 17,586; Referee: Paul Danson

30 August 2003 4	Sheffield United	2–1	Coventry City	Sheffield
15:00 BST	Brown 42' (pen.); Lester 87'	report	Suffo 67'	Stadium: Bramall Lane; Attendance: 20,102; Referee: David Crick

13 September 2003 5	Coventry City	4–2	Stoke City	Coventry
15:00 BST	Suffo 5'; Barrett 10'; Adebola 58'; Morrell 75'	report	Asaba 45'; Thomas 78'	Stadium: Highfield Road; Attendance: 13,982; Referee: Lee Mason

16 September 2003 6	Preston North End	4–2	Coventry City	Preston
19:45 BST	Fuller 35', 45'; Cresswell 66'; Keane 88'	report	Staunton 42' (pen.); Morrell 77'	Stadium: Deepdale; Attendance: 11,886; Referee: Eddie Evans

20 September 2003 7	Reading	1–2	Coventry City	Reading
15:00 BST	Forster 21'	report	Adebola 35'; Morrell 76'	Stadium: Madejski Stadium; Attendance: 15,371; Referee: Phil Crossley

27 September 2003 8	Coventry City	1–1	Wigan Athletic	Coventry
15:00 BST	Morrell 90'	report	Jackson 90'	Stadium: Highfield Road; Attendance: 14,862; Referee: Mike Thorpe

1 October 2003 9	Coventry City	2–0	Crewe Alexandra	Coventry
19:45 BST	McAllister 49'; Morrell 73'	report		Stadium: Highfield Road; Attendance: 11,557; Referee: Joe Ross

4 October 2003 10	Millwall	2–1	Coventry City	London
15:00 BST	Ifill 63'; Harris 85'	report	Staunton 72' (pen.)	Stadium: The Den; Attendance: 9,849; Referee: Phil Joslin

15 October 2003 11	Coventry City	1–0	Wimbledon	Coventry
19:45 BST	Pead 63'	report		Stadium: Highfield Road; Attendance: 10,872; Referee: Steve Bennett

18 October 2003 12	Coventry City	1–3	Cardiff City	Coventry
12:30 BST	Doyle 11'	report	Whalley 28'; Gordon 32'; Earnshaw 40' (pen.)	Stadium: Highfield Road; Attendance: 11,767; Referee: Eddie Ilderton

21 October 2003 13	Watford	1–1	Coventry City	Watford
19:45 BST	Fitzgerald 83'	report	Staunton 90'	Stadium: Vicarage Road; Attendance: 13,487; Referee: Alan Kaye
Note: This match was originally scheduled for the opening weekend of the season, however was postponed due to the death of Watford player Jimmy Davis

25 October 2003 14	Derby County	1–3	Coventry City	Derby
15:00 BST	Holmes 52'	report	Warnock 11'; Suffo 38', 80'	Stadium: Pride Park Stadium; Attendance: 21,641; Referee: Roy Pearson

1 November 2003 15	Coventry City	1–1	West Ham United	Coventry
15:00 GMT	Barrett 38'	report	Defoe 15'	Stadium: Highfield Road; Attendance: 19,126; Referee: Graham Salisbury

5 November 2003 16	Coventry City	0–0	Bradford City	Coventry
19:45 GMT		report		Stadium: Highfield Road; Attendance: 11,862; Referee: Grant Hegley

8 November 2003 17	Sunderland	0–0	Coventry City	Sunderland
15:00 GMT		report		Stadium: Stadium of Light; Attendance: 27,247; Referee: Alan Butler

22 November 2003 18	Coventry City	2–2	Gillingham	Coventry
15:00 GMT	Joachim 55', 90'	report	Johnson 66', 85'	Stadium: Highfield Road; Attendance: 13,432; Referee: Steve Dunn

25 November 2003 19	Norwich City	1–1	Coventry City	Norwich
19:45 GMT	Henderson 35'	report	McAllister 49' (pen.)	Stadium: Carrow Road; Attendance: 16,414; Referee: Paul Taylor

29 November 2003 20	Crystal Palace	1–1	Coventry City	London
15:00 GMT	Edwards 9'	report	Jackson 90'	Stadium: Selhurst Park; Attendance: 14,622; Referee: Mark Warren

2 December 2003 21	Rotherham United	2–0	Coventry City	Rotherham
19:45 GMT	Byfield 14'; Barker 39'	report		Stadium: Millmoor; Attendance: 5,524; Referee: Andy D'Urso

8 December 2003 22	Coventry City	1–1	Sunderland	Coventry
20:00 GMT	McAllister 22' (pen.)	report	Downing 8'	Stadium: Highfield Road; Attendance: 12,913; Referee: Mike Jones

13 December 2003 23	Burnley	1–2	Coventry City	Burnley
15:00 GMT	Blake 53'	report	Suffo 8'; Weller 40' (o.g.)	Stadium: Turf Moor; Attendance: 10,358; Referee: Mick Fletcher

20 December 2003 24	Coventry City	1–0	West Bromwich Albion	Coventry
15:00 GMT	Jackson 89'	report		Stadium: Highfield Road; Attendance: 17,616; Referee: Neale Barry

26 December 2003 25	Coventry City	0–1	Sheffield United	Coventry
15:00 GMT		report	Lester 56' (pen.)	Stadium: Highfield Road; Attendance: 21,132; Referee: Clive Penton

28 December 2003 26	Bradford City	1–0	Coventry City	Bradford
15:00 GMT	Windass 34'	report		Stadium: Bradford & Bingley Stadium; Attendance: 11,432; Referee: Carl Boyeson

10 January 2004 27	Coventry City	0–0	Watford	Coventry
15:00 GMT		report		Stadium: Highfield Road; Attendance: 12,226; Referee: Mike Pike

17 January 2004 28	Walsall	1–6	Coventry City	Walsall
15:00 GMT	Wrack 45'	report	Morrell 6', 57'; McSheffrey 48', 82'; Joachim 70'; Roper 76' (o.g.)	Stadium: Bescot Stadium; Attendance: 8,264; Referee: Lee Mason

31 January 2004 29	Coventry City	1–1	Ipswich Town	Coventry
15:00 GMT	Warnock 45'	report	Westlake 58'	Stadium: Highfield Road; Attendance: 14,441; Referee: Trevor Kettle

7 February 2004 30	Nottingham Forest	0–1	Coventry City	Nottingham
15:00 GMT		report	Suffo 4'	Stadium: City Ground; Attendance: 23,075; Referee: Graham Salisbury

14 February 2004 31	Coventry City	0–2	Norwich City	Coventry
15:00		report	Holt 38'; Brennan 85'	Stadium: Highfield Road; Attendance: 15,757; Referee: Paul Robinson

21 February 2004 32	Wimbledon	0–3	Coventry City	Milton Keynes
15:00 GMT		report	Joachim 9'; Chorley 40' (o.g.); Guðjónsson 63'	Stadium: National Hockey Stadium; Attendance: 5,905; Referee: Steve Tanner

28 February 2004 33	Coventry City	2–0	Derby County	Coventry
15:00 GMT	McSheffrey 20'; Joachim 33'	report		Stadium: Highfield Road; Attendance: 16,042; Referee: Iain Williamson

2 March 2004 34	Cardiff City	0–1	Coventry City	Cardiff
19:45 GMT		report	McSheffrey 71' (pen.)	Stadium: Ninian Park; Attendance: 14,376; Referee: Paul Armstrong

6 March 2004 35	West Bromwich Albion	3–0	Coventry City	West Bromwich
15:00 GMT	Horsfield 23'; Hulse 53'; Kinsella 79'	report		Stadium: The Hawthorns; Attendance: 25,414; Referee: Mike Pike

13 March 2004 36	Coventry City	4–0	Burnley	Coventry
15:00 GMT	Joachim 10'; McSheffrey 33', 39' (pen.); Konjić 78'	report		Stadium: Highfield Road; Attendance: 12,953; Referee: Anthony Bates

17 March 2004 37	Coventry City	4–1	Preston North End	Coventry
19:45 GMT	Guðjónsson 2', 27'; Doyle 8'; McSheffrey 11'	report	Fuller 48'	Stadium: Highfield Road; Attendance: 13,142; Referee: Neale Barry

20 March 2004 38	Wigan Athletic	2–1	Coventry City	Wigan
15:00 GMT	Roberts 16', 22'	report	Warnock 72'	Stadium: JJB Stadium; Attendance: 8,784; Referee: Lee Cable

27 March 2004 39	Coventry City	1–2	Reading	Coventry
15:00 GMT	McSheffrey 67'	report	Salako 10'; Goater 54'	Stadium: Highfield Road; Attendance: 15,811; Referee: Alan Butler

3 April 2004 40	Stoke City	1–0	Coventry City	Stoke-on-Trent
15:00 BST	Commons 41'	report		Stadium: Britannia Stadium; Attendance: 12,855; Referee: Mike Dean

10 April 2004 41	Coventry City	4–0	Millwall	Coventry
15:00 BST	Joachim 6', 58'; Deloumeaux 12'; McSheffrey 87' (pen.)	report		Stadium: Highfield Road; Attendance: 12,546; Referee: Barry Knight

12 April 2004 42	Crewe Alexandra	3–1	Coventry City	Crewe
15:00 BST	Higdon 46'; Symes 64'; Ashton 90' (pen.)	report	Lowe 83'	Stadium: Alexandra Stadium; Attendance: 7,475; Referee: Frazer Stretton

17 April 2004 43	West Ham United	2–0	Coventry City	London
15:00 BST	Zamora 37'; Connolly 71' (pen.)	report		Stadium: Boleyn Ground; Attendance: 27,890; Referee: Howard Webb

24 April 2004 44	Coventry City	1–1	Rotherham United	Coventry
15:00 BST	Morrell 56'	report	Butler 75'	Stadium: Highfield Road; Attendance: 13,572; Referee: Chris Foy

1 May 2004 45	Gillingham	2–5	Coventry City	Gillingham
15:00 BST	Wales 64'; Sidibe 72'	report	Doyle 8'; Morrell 24'; McSheffrey 31', 85'; Shaw 90'	Stadium: Priestfield Stadium; Attendance: 10,388; Referee: Anthony Bates

9 May 2004 46	Coventry City	2–1	Crystal Palace	Coventry
13:00 BST	Konjić 4'; Doyle 27'	report	Freedman 64'	Stadium: Highfield Road; Attendance: 22,195; Referee: Alan Butler

=== FA Cup ===
3 January 2004 R3	Coventry City	2–1	Peterborough United	Coventry
15:00	McSheffrey 59'; Joachim 61'	report	Clarke 79'	Stadium: Highfield Road; Attendance: 11,400; Referee: Barry Knight

24 January 2004 R4	Coventry City	1–1	Colchester United	Coventry
15:00	Joachim 33'	report	Adebola 30' (o.g.)	Stadium: Highfield Road; Attendance: 15,341; Referee: Mark Clattenburg

3 February 2004 R4 Replay	Colchester United	3–1	Coventry City	Colchester
20:00	Vine 12', 43', 57'	report	Joachim 25'	Stadium: Layer Road; Attendance: 5,530; Referee: Tony Leake

=== League Cup ===
13 August 2003 R1	Coventry City	2–0	Peterborough United	Coventry
19:45	Barrett 63'; Adebola 67'	report		Stadium: Highfield Road; Attendance: 8,280; Referee: Tony Leake

24 September 2003 R2	Coventry City	0–3	Tottenham Hotspur	Coventry
19:45		report	Kanouté 13', 87'; Keane 38'	Stadium: Highfield Road; Attendance: 15,474

== Championship data ==
=== League table ===
Pos	Team	Pld	W	D	L	GF	GA	GD	Pts	Promotion, qualification or relegation
10	Millwall	46	18	15	13	55	48	+7	69	Qualification for the UEFA Cup first round (Note: Since the FA Cup winners Manchester United qualified for the Champions League, their place in the UEFA Cup went to Millwall, who were the FA Cup runners-up.)
11	Stoke City	46	18	12	16	58	55	+3	66	
12	Coventry City	46	17	14	15	67	54	+13	65	
13	Cardiff City	46	17	14	15	68	58	+10	65	
14	Nottingham Forest	46	15	15	16	61	58	+3	60	

Source: Soccerway
Rules for classification: 1) points; 2) goal difference; 3) number of goals scored.

=== Results summary ===
Overall								Home						Away					
Pld	W	D	L	GF	GA	GD	Pts	W	D	L	GF	GA	GD	W	D	L	GF	GA	GD
46	17	14	15	67	54	+13	65	9	9	5	34	22	+12	8	5	10	33	32	+1

Last updated: 8 May 2004.
Source: CCFC Championship Results

=== Round by round ===
Round	1	2	3	4	5	6	7	8	9	10	11	12	13	14	15	16	17	18	19	20	21	22	23	24	25	26	27	28	29	30	31	32	33	34	35	36	37	38	39	40	41	42	43	44	45	46
Ground	H	A	H	A	H	A	A	H	H	A	H	H	A	A	H	H	A	H	A	A	A	H	A	H	H	A	H	A	H	A	H	A	H	A	A	H	H	A	H	A	H	A	A	H	A	H
Result	D	D	L	L	W	L	W	D	W	L	W	L	D	W	D	D	D	D	D	D	L	D	W	W	L	L	D	W	D	W	L	W	W	W	L	W	W	L	L	L	W	L	L	D	W	W
Position	15	19	20	21	18	19	18	20	16	18	14	16	16	15	14	15	15	16	15	15	15	17	14	12	15	17	15	14	15	14	14	14	12	10	13	10	10	10	11	11	12	12	13	12	12	12

Source: Championship Results
A = Away; H = Home; W = Win; D = Draw; L = Loss

=== Scores Overview ===
Opposition	Home Score	Away Score	Double
Bradford City	0–0	0–1	✗
Burnley	4–0	2–1	✓
Cardiff City	1–3	1–0	✗
Crewe Alexandra	2–0	1–3	✗
Crystal Palace	2–1	1–1	✗
Derby County	2–0	3–1	✓
Gillingham	2–2	5–2	✗
Ipswich Town	1–1	1–1	✗
Millwall	4–0	1–2	✗
Norwich City	0–2	1–1	✗
Nottingham Forest	1–3	1–0	✗
Preston North End	4–1	2–4	✗
Reading	1–2	2–1	✗
Rotherham United	1–1	0–2	✗
Sheffield United	0–1	1–2	✗
Stoke City	4–2	0–1	✗
Sunderland	1–1	0–0	✗
Walsall	0–0	6–1	✗
Watford	0–0	1–1	✗
West Bromwich Albion	1–0	0–3	✗
West Ham United	1–1	0–2	✗
Wigan Athletic	1–1	1–2	✗
Wimbledon	1–0	3–0	✓

== Season statistics ==
=== Stats and goals ===
No.	Pos	Nat	Player	Total		Championship		FA Cup		League Cup	
No.	Pos	Nat	Player	Apps	Goals	Apps	Goals	Apps	Goals	Apps	Goals
1	GK	(Scotland) SCO	Scott Shearer	32	0	29+1	0	0+0	0	2+0	0
2	DF	(England) ENG	Andy Whing	31	1	26+2	1	2+0	0	1+0	0
3	DF	(England) ENG	Dean Gordon	7	0	3+2	0	1+1	0	0+0	0
4	DF	(Bosnia and Herzegovina) BIH	Muhamed Konjić	47	2	36+6	2	3+0	0	2+0	0
5	DF	(England) ENG	Richard Shaw	21	1	11+8	1	1+0	0	1+0	0
6	MF	(Morocco) MAR	Youssef Safri	34	0	31+0	0	1+0	0	2+0	0
7	MF	(England) ENG	Craig Pead	18	1	6+11	1	0+0	0	1+0	0
8	FW	(Cameroon) CMR	Patrick Suffo	29	6	20+7	6	0+0	0	2+0	0
9	FW	(Nigeria) NGA	Dele Adebola	33	3	15+13	2	2+1	0	2+0	1
11	FW	(Republic of Ireland) IRL	Graham Barrett	33	3	20+11	2	0+0	0	1+1	1
12	FW	(England) ENG	Andy Morrell	34	9	19+11	9	2+0	0	1+1	0
13	GK	(England) ENG	Gavin Ward	15	0	12+0	0	3+0	0	0+0	0
15	MF	(Faroe Islands) FRO	Claus Bech Jørgensen	10	0	4+4	0	0+0	0	1+1	0
17	MF	(Republic of Ireland) IRL	Michael Doyle	45	5	38+2	5	3+0	0	2+0	0
18	DF	(Republic of Ireland) IRL	Steve Staunton	38	3	34+1	3	2+0	0	1+0	0
19	FW	(England) ENG	Gary McSheffrey	22	12	16+3	11	2+1	1	0+0	0
20	DF	(England) ENG	Calum Davenport	36	0	31+2	0	3+0	0	0+0	0
21	FW	(England) ENG	Julian Joachim	32	11	27+2	8	3+0	3	0+0	0
22	DF	(France) FRA	Éric Deloumeaux	21	1	19+0	1	2+0	0	0+0	0
26	MF	(England) ENG	Stephen Warnock	49	3	42+2	3	2+1	0	2+0	0
28	FW	(England) ENG	Avun Jephcott	1	0	0+0	0	0+0	0	0+1	0
31	MF	(Iceland) ISL	Bjarni Guðjónsson	20	3	17+1	3	1+1	0	0+0	0
35	FW	(Jamaica) JAM	Onandi Lowe	2	1	1+1	1	0+0	0	0+0	0
36	GK	(Guadeloupe) GLP	Pegguy Arphexad	5	0	5+0	0	0+0	0	0+0	0
37	DF	(England) ENG	Stuart Giddings	1	0	0+1	0	0+0	0	0+0	0
38	MF	(Scotland) SCO	Brian Kerr	9	0	5+4	0	0+0	0	0+0	0
Player's featured for Coventry who left before end of the season:
	DF	(England) ENG	Peter Clarke	5	0	5+0	0	0+0	0	0+0	0
	DF	(England) ENG	Martin Grainger	7	0	7+0	0	0+0	0	0+0	0
	MF	(England) ENG	Johnnie Jackson	5	2	2+3	2	0+0	0	0+0	0
	MF	(Algeria) ALG	Yazid Mansouri	15	0	9+5	0	0+0	0	1+0	0
	MF	(Scotland) SCO	Gary McAllister	14	3	14+0	3	0+0	0	0+0	0
	MF	(Republic of Ireland) IRL	Keith O'Neill	1	0	0+1	0	0+0	0	0+0	0
	MF	(Wales) WAL	David Pipe	1	0	0+0	0	0+0	0	0+1	0
	MF	(England) ENG	Courtney Pitt	2	0	1+0	0	0+1	0	0+0	0
	FW	(Poland) POL	Sebastian Olszar	5	0	1+4	0	0+0	0	0+0	0

=== Goalscorers ===
No.	Flag	Pos	Name	First Division	FA Cup	League Cup	Total
19	(England)	FW	Gary McSheffrey	11	1	0	12
21	(England)	FW	Julian Joachim	8	3	0	11
12	(England)	FW	Andy Morrell	9	0	0	9
8	(Cameroon)	FW	Patrick Suffo	6	0	0	6
17	(Republic of Ireland)	MF	Michael Doyle	5	0	0	5
9	(Nigeria)	FW	Dele Adebola	2	0	1	3
11	(Republic of Ireland)	FW	Graham Barrett	2	0	1	3
31	(Iceland)	MF	Bjarni Guðjónsson	3	0	0	3
	(Scotland)	MF	Gary McAllister	3	0	0	3
18	(Republic of Ireland)	DF	Steve Staunton	3	0	0	3
26	(England)	MF	Stephen Warnock	3	0	0	3
	(England)	MF	Johnnie Jackson	2	0	0	2
4	(Bosnia and Herzegovina)	DF	Muhamed Konjić	2	0	0	2
22	(France)	DF	Éric Deloumeaux	1	0	0	1
35	(Jamaica)	FW	Onandi Lowe	1	0	0	1
7	(England)	MF	Craig Pead	1	0	0	1
5	(England)	DF	Richard Shaw	1	0	0	1
2	(England)	DF	Andy Whing	1	0	0	1

=== Overall ===
Games played	51 (46 First Division, 2 League Cup, 3 FA Cup)
Games won	19 (17 First Division, 1 League Cup, 1 FA Cup)
Games drawn	15 (14 First Division, 0 League Cup, 1 FA Cup)
Games lost	17 (15 First Division, 1 League Cup, 1 FA Cup)
Goals scored	73 (67 First Division, 2 League Cup, 4 FA Cup)
Goals conceded	62 (54 First Division, 3 League Cup, 5 FA Cup)
Goal difference	+11
Best result	W 6–1 (A) v Walsall – First Division – 17 January 2004
Worst result	L 0–3 (A) v Tottenham Hotspur – League Cup – 24 September 2003; L 0–3 (A) v West Bromwich Albion – First Division – 6 March 2004
Most appearances	(England) Stephen Warnock (49 appearances)
Top scorer	(England) Gary McSheffrey (12 goals)
Points	65 / 138 (47.10%)

== Transfers ==
=== In ===
- (Republic of Ireland) Graham Barrett – unattached (last at (England) Arsenal), 30 May
- (Faroe Islands) Claus Bech Jørgensen – unattached (last at (England) Bradford City), 4 August
- (Republic of Ireland) Steve Staunton – unattached (last at (England) Aston Villa), 15 August
- (Jamaica) Onandi Lowe – (England) Rushden & Diamonds, 25 March, free
- (Nigeria) Dele Adebola – unattached (last at (England) Crystal Palace)
- (England) Andy Morrell – unattached (last at (Wales) Wrexham)
- (Iceland) Bjarni Guðjónsson – unattached (last at (Germany) VfL Bochum)
- (France) Pegguy Arphexad – unattached (last at (England) Liverpool
- (England) Scott Shearer – (Scotland) Albion Rovers
- (Cameroon) Patrick Suffo – (Saudi Arabia) Al-Hilal
- (England) Gavin Ward – (England) Walsall
- (Republic of Ireland) Michael Doyle – (Scotland) Celtic
- (France) Éric Deloumeaux – (Scotland) Aberdeen

=== Out ===
- (England) Robert Betts – released, 23 May (later joined (England) Rochdale)
- (England) Lee Fowler – released, 13 November (later joined (England) Huddersfield Town)
- (Scotland) Gary McAllister – re-signed as player-manager, 12 January
- (England) Jay Bothroyd – released (later joined (Italy) Perugia on 11 July)
- (England) John Eustace – released (later joined (England) Stoke City on 18 July)
- (Republic of Ireland) Keith O'Neill – retired
- (Morocco) Youssef Chippo – (Qatar) Al Sadd
- (England) Gary Montgomery – (England) Rotherham United
- (Denmark) Morten Hyldgaard – (Scotland) Hibernian
- (France) Christian Yulu
- (France) Fabien Debec
- (Republic of Ireland) Sean Cooney
- (England) Tom Bates

=== Loans in ===
- (Iceland) Bjarni Guðjónsson – (Germany) VfL Bochum, 16 January, five-month-long loan
- (England) Stephen Warnock – (England) Liverpool, season-long loan
- (England) Martin Grainger – (England) Birmingham City
- (England) Johnnie Jackson – (England) Tottenham Hotspur
- (Algeria) Yazid Mansouri – (France) Le Havre
- (Poland) Sebastian Olszar – (England) Portsmouth
- (England) Courtney Pitt – (England) Portsmouth
- (Scotland) Brian Kerr – (England) Newcastle United
- (England) Peter Clarke – (England) Everton

=== Loans out ===
- (England) Lee Fowler – (England) Huddersfield Town
- (Republic of Ireland) Barry Quinn – (England) Rushden & Diamonds
