= 2001–02 Coventry City F.C. season =

Coventry City
2001–02 season
- Chairman: Bryan Richardson (until 30 January); Mike McGinnity (from 30 January)
- Manager: Gordon Strachan (until 10 September); Roland Nilsson (player-manager until 16 April); Gary McAllister (from 24 April)
- Stadium: Highfield Road
- First Division: 11th
- FA Cup: Third round
- League Cup: Third round
- Top goalscorer: Lee Hughes (14)
- Average home league attendance: 15,436

During the 2001–02 English football season, Coventry City F.C. competed in the Football League First Division, following relegation from the FA Premier League the previous season.

== Season summary ==
Despite the signing of prolific striker Lee Hughes from local rivals West Bromwich Albion, Coventry City were unable to make a genuine push for an immediate return to the Premier League and finished well away from promotion in 11th place. Manager Gordon Strachan had been sacked after five games with only one win and Coventry 19th; this heralded the beginning of an eleven-match unbeaten run which saw Coventry top the table with a third of the season gone, but from then three straight losses took them down to ninth. Coventry never regained the form from that unbeaten run, but with seven games left to play they stood fourth and appeared almost certain to gain a playoff place. Unfortunately, Coventry only gained one point from those last seven games and fell down to 11th place.

== Final league table ==
Pos	Team	Pld	W	D	L	GF	GA	GD	Pts
9	Wimbledon	46	18	13	15	63	57	+6	67
10	Crystal Palace	46	20	6	20	70	62	+8	66
11	Coventry City	46	20	6	20	59	53	+6	66
12	Gillingham	46	18	10	18	64	67	−3	64
13	Sheffield United	46	15	15	16	53	54	−1	60

Rules for classification: 1) Points; 2) Goal difference; 3) Goals scored

== Results ==
Coventry City's score comes first

=== Legend ===
Win	Draw	Loss

=== Football League First Division ===
Date	Opponent	Venue	Result	Attendance	Scorers
11 August 2001	Stockport County	A	2–0	9,329	Hughes, Carsley
19 August 2001	Wolverhampton Wanderers	H	0–1	22,902	
24 August 2001	Bradford City	A	1–2	15,085	Bothroyd
27 August 2001	Nottingham Forest	H	0–0	18,467	
8 September 2001	Grimsby Town	H	0–1	14,980	
15 September 2001	Sheffield United	A	1–0	16,168	Delorge
19 September 2001	Manchester City	H	4–3	18,804	Pearce (own goal), Konjić, Hughes, Thompson
22 September 2001	Portsmouth	H	2–0	18,303	Bothroyd, Carsley
25 September 2001	Barnsley	A	1–1	11,692	Martínez
29 September 2001	Gillingham	A	2–1	9,435	Martínez, Chippo
14 October 2001	Walsall	A	1–0	7,515	Thompson
17 October 2001	Rotherham United	A	0–0	6,582	
21 October 2001	Crewe Alexandra	H	1–0	15,788	Hughes (pen)
24 October 2001	Wimbledon	A	1–0	5,883	Thompson
27 October 2001	Sheffield Wednesday	H	2–0	17,381	Safri, Hughes (pen)
31 October 2001	Preston North End	H	2–2	15,755	Thompson (2)
3 November 2001	Millwall	A	2–3	15,748	Martínez, Bothroyd
17 November 2001	Burnley	H	0–2	16,849	
25 November 2001	Birmingham City	A	0–2	18,279	
28 November 2001	Crystal Palace	H	2–0	13,695	Delorge, Mills
1 December 2001	Wimbledon	H	3–1	17,303	Hughes, Mills, Thompson
9 December 2001	Watford	H	0–2	13,251	
12 December 2001	West Bromwich Albion	A	0–1	22,543	
15 December 2001	Norwich City	A	0–2	17,889	
23 December 2001	Bradford City	H	4–0	14,977	Hughes (2, 1 pen), Thompson, Joachim
26 December 2001	Grimsby Town	A	1–0	7,568	Hughes
29 December 2001	Nottingham Forest	A	1–2	22,706	Chippo
13 January 2002	Wolverhampton Wanderers	A	1–3	21,009	Bothroyd
19 January 2002	Stockport County	H	0–0	12,448	
29 January 2002	Crystal Palace	A	3–1	16,197	Bothroyd, Hall, McSheffrey
2 February 2002	Gillingham	H	1–2	14,337	Bothroyd
6 February 2002	Rotherham United	H	2–0	12,893	Konjić, Hughes
9 February 2002	Crewe Alexandra	A	6–1	7,835	Delorge (2), Hughes (3), Thompson
16 February 2002	Walsall	H	2–1	13,736	Thompson, Chippo
23 February 2002	Barnsley	H	4–0	15,092	Chippo, Thompson (2), Mills
26 February 2002	Portsmouth	A	0–1	12,336	
3 March 2002	Manchester City	A	2–4	33,335	Mills (2)
6 March 2002	Sheffield United	H	1–0	12,963	Thompson
9 March 2002	Norwich City	H	2–1	16,744	Hughes (2, 1 pen)
16 March 2002	Watford	A	0–3	15,833	
24 March 2002	Birmingham City	H	1–1	17,945	Healy
29 March 2002	Sheffield Wednesday	A	1–2	21,470	Healy
1 April 2002	West Bromwich Albion	H	0–1	21,513	
6 April 2002	Preston North End	A	0–4	15,665	
12 April 2002	Millwall	H	0–1	15,335	
21 April 2002	Burnley	A	0–1	18,751	

=== FA Cup ===
Round	Date	Opponent	Venue	Result	Attendance	Goalscorers
R3	16 January 2002	Tottenham Hotspur	H	0–2	20,758	

=== League Cup ===
Round	Date	Opponent	Venue	Result	Attendance	Goalscorers
R2	11 September 2001	Peterborough United	A	2–2 (won 4–2 on pens)	5,729	Thompson, Carsley
R3	9 October 2001	Chelsea	H	0–2	12,582	

== Squad ==
Note: Flags indicate national team as defined under FIFA eligibility rules; some limited exceptions apply. Players may hold more than one non-FIFA nationality.

No.	Pos.	Nation	Player
2	DF	ENG	Marc Edworthy
3	DF	ENG	Marcus Hall
4	DF	ARG	Horacio Carbonari (on loan from Derby County)
5	DF	IRL	Gary Breen
6	DF	ENG	Richard Shaw
7	MF	ENG	David Thompson
8	MF	WAL	Paul Trollope
9	FW	ENG	Lee Hughes
10	FW	ENG	Julian Joachim
11	MF	MAR	Youssef Chippo
12	FW	ENG	Lee Mills
13	GK	SWE	Magnus Hedman
14	DF	IRL	Barry Quinn
15	MF	ENG	John Eustace
16	MF	IRL	Keith O'Neill
17	FW	PER	Ysrael Zúñiga
18	MF	SCO	Gavin Strachan
19	MF	HON	Iván Guerrero
21	FW	ENG	Jay Bothroyd
22	DF	BIH	Muhamed Konjić

No.	Pos.	Nation	Player
23	GK	DEN	Morten Hyldgaard
24	DF	SWE	Roland Nilsson (player-manager)
25	FW	HON	Jairo Martínez
26	DF	ENG	Calum Davenport
27	MF	MAR	Youssef Safri
28	MF	BEL	Laurent Delorge
29	FW	ENG	Gary McSheffrey
31	FW	NOR	Runar Normann
32	MF	WAL	Lee Fowler
33	GK	ENG	Gary Montgomery
34	DF	SWE	Richard Spong
35	MF	IRL	Colin Healy (on loan from Celtic)
36	MF	ENG	Robert Betts
37	MF	SCO	Craig Strachan
38	FW	SCO	Gary McPhee
39	MF	SWE	Andreas Dahl
40	DF	ENG	Thomas Cudworth
41	DF	ENG	Craig Pead
42	MF	IRL	Barry Ferguson

=== Left club during season ===
Note: Flags indicate national team as defined under FIFA eligibility rules; some limited exceptions apply. Players may hold more than one non-FIFA nationality.

No.	Pos.	Nation	Player
1	GK	ENG	Chris Kirkland (to Liverpool)
4	DF	ENG	Paul Williams (to Southampton)
8	MF	IRL	Lee Carsley (to Everton)
12	MF	ENG	Paul Telfer (to Southampton)

No.	Pos.	Nation	Player
20	MF	SWE	Tomas Gustafsson (to Copenhagen)
30	GK	SCO	Andy Goram (to Oldham Athletic)
30	GK	ENG	Tim Flowers (on loan from Leicester City)
35	MF	ENG	Carlton Palmer (to Stockport County)

=== Reserve squad ===
Note: Flags indicate national team as defined under FIFA eligibility rules; some limited exceptions apply. Players may hold more than one non-FIFA nationality.

No.	Pos.	Nation	Player
—	GK	SWE	Per Fahlman
—	DF	IRL	Sean Cooney
—	DF	IRL	Conor Kenna
—	MF	NIR	Ruaidhri Higgins
—	MF	NIR	Mark Magennis

No.	Pos.	Nation	Player
—	MF	ENG	Mark Noon
—	MF	IRL	Stephen Rice
—	FW	ENG	Rory May
—	FW	IRL	Roy O'Donovan

== Transfers ==
=== In ===
- (England) Julian Joachim - (England) Aston Villa, 6 July, part-exchange
- (Republic of Ireland) Keith O'Neill - (England) Middlesbrough, 8 August, £750,000
- (England) Lee Hughes - (England) West Bromwich Albion, 8 August, £5,000,001
- (Morocco) Youssef Safri - (Morocco) Raja Casablanca, 11 August, £700,000
- (Scotland) Andy Goram - unattached (last at (Scotland) Hamilton Academical), 24 August
- (England) Lee Mills - (England) Portsmouth, 1 January, £250,000
- (Wales) Paul Trollope - (England) Fulham, 22 March, free

=== Out ===
- (Scotland) Stephen McPhee - released (later joined (England) Port Vale on 24 June)
- (Wales) Craig Bellamy - (England) Newcastle United, 25 June, £6,000,000
- (Australia) John Aloisi - (Spain) Osasuna, 3 July, £1,200,000
- (Morocco) Mustapha Hadji - (England) Aston Villa, 6 July, £2,000,000 plus Julian Joachim
- (Wales) John Hartson - (Scotland) Celtic, 2 August, £6,000,000
- (England) Chris Kirkland - (England) Liverpool, 31 August, £6,000,000
- (England) Paul Williams - (England) Southampton, 31 October, free
- (Scotland) Paul Telfer - (England) Southampton, 31 October, free
- (England) Carlton Palmer - (England) Stockport County, 6 November, free
- (Sweden) Tomas Gustafsson - (Denmark) Copenhagen, 4 February, undisclosed
- (Republic of Ireland) Lee Carsley - (England) Everton, 8 February, £1,900,000
- (Sweden) Roland Nilsson - retired, 8 April
- (England) Steve Froggatt - retired
- (Scotland) Andy Goram - (England) Oldham Athletic

=== Loan in ===
- (England) Lee Mills - (England) Portsmouth, December, one month
- (Argentina) Horacio Carbonari - (England) Derby County, 22 March, one month
- (Republic of Ireland) Colin Healy - (Scotland) Celtic, 29 January, 84 days
- (England) Tim Flowers - (England) Leicester City

=== Loan out ===
- (England) Carlton Palmer - (England) Sheffield Wednesday, 4 September, 46 days

== Statistics ==
=== Appearances and goals ===
No.	Pos	Nat	Player	Total		Premier League		FA Cup		League Cup	
No.	Pos	Nat	Player	Apps	Goals	Apps	Goals	Apps	Goals	Apps	Goals
Goalkeepers
13	GK	(Sweden) SWE	Magnus Hedman	36	0	34	0	1	0	1	0
33	GK	(England) ENG	Gary Montgomery	1	0	0	0	0	0	1	0
Defenders
2	DF	(England) ENG	Marc Edworthy	22	0	18+2	0	1	0	1	0
3	DF	(England) ENG	Marcus Hall	30	1	27+2	1	0	0	1	0
4	DF	(Argentina) ARG	Horacio Carbonari	5	0	5	0	0	0	0	0
5	DF	(Republic of Ireland) IRL	Gary Breen	33	0	30	0	1	0	2	0
6	DF	(England) ENG	Richard Shaw	35	0	29+3	0	1	0	1+1	0
14	DF	(Republic of Ireland) IRL	Barry Quinn	24	0	18+4	0	0+1	0	1	0
19	DF	(Honduras) HON	Iván Guerrero	4	0	3+1	0	0	0	0	0
22	DF	(Bosnia and Herzegovina) BIH	Muhamed Konjić	41	2	38	2	1	0	2	0
24	DF	(Sweden) SWE	Roland Nilsson	10	0	9	0	0	0	1	0
26	DF	(England) ENG	Calum Davenport	3	0	1+2	0	0	0	0	0
41	DF	(England) ENG	Craig Pead	1	0	1	0	0	0	0	0
Midfielders
7	MF	(England) ENG	David Thompson	40	13	35+2	12	1	0	2	1
8	MF	(Wales) WAL	Paul Trollope	6	0	5+1	0	0	0	0	0
11	MF	(Morocco) MAR	Youssef Chippo	34	4	29+4	4	0	0	1	0
15	MF	(England) ENG	John Eustace	5	0	5	0	0	0	0	0
16	MF	(Republic of Ireland) IRL	Keith O'Neill	11	0	7+4	0	0	0	0	0
18	MF	(Scotland) SCO	Gavin Strachan	1	0	0+1	0	0	0	0	0
27	MF	(Morocco) MAR	Youssef Safri	35	1	32+1	1	0	0	2	0
28	MF	(Belgium) BEL	Laurent Delorge	30	4	21+7	4	0+1	0	0+1	0
32	MF	(Wales) WAL	Lee Fowler	13	0	5+8	0	0	0	0	0
35	MF	(Republic of Ireland) IRL	Colin Healy	17	2	17	2	0	0	0	0
36	MF	(England) ENG	Robert Betts	10	0	4+5	0	1	0	0	0
Forwards
9	FW	(England) ENG	Lee Hughes	40	14	35+3	14	0	0	1+1	0
10	FW	(England) ENG	Julian Joachim	18	1	4+12	1	1	0	1	0
12	FW	(England) ENG	Lee Mills	20	5	19+1	5	0	0	0	0
17	FW	(Peru) PER	Ysrael Zúñiga	6	0	1+5	0	0	0	0	0
21	FW	(England) ENG	Jay Bothroyd	34	6	24+7	6	1	0	1+1	0
25	FW	(Honduras) HON	Jairo Martínez	13	3	5+6	3	0+1	0	1	0
29	FW	(England) ENG	Gary McSheffrey	9	1	1+7	1	0	0	0+1	0
31	FW	(Norway) NOR	Runar Normann	2	0	0+2	0	0	0	0	0
Players transferred or loaned out during the season
1	GK	(England) ENG	Chris Kirkland	1	0	1	0	0	0	0	0
4	DF	(England) ENG	Paul Williams	5	0	4+1	0	0	0	0	0
8	MF	(Republic of Ireland) IRL	Lee Carsley	29	3	25+1	2	1	0	2	1
20	DF	(Sweden) SWE	Tomas Gustafsson	6	0	3+2	0	1	0	0	0
30	GK	(Scotland) SCO	Andy Goram	7	0	6+1	0	0	0	0	0
30	GK	(England) ENG	Tim Flowers	5	0	5	0	0	0	0	0

Last updated: 31 June 2002
Source: Competitions
