= List of Coventry City F.C. international footballers =

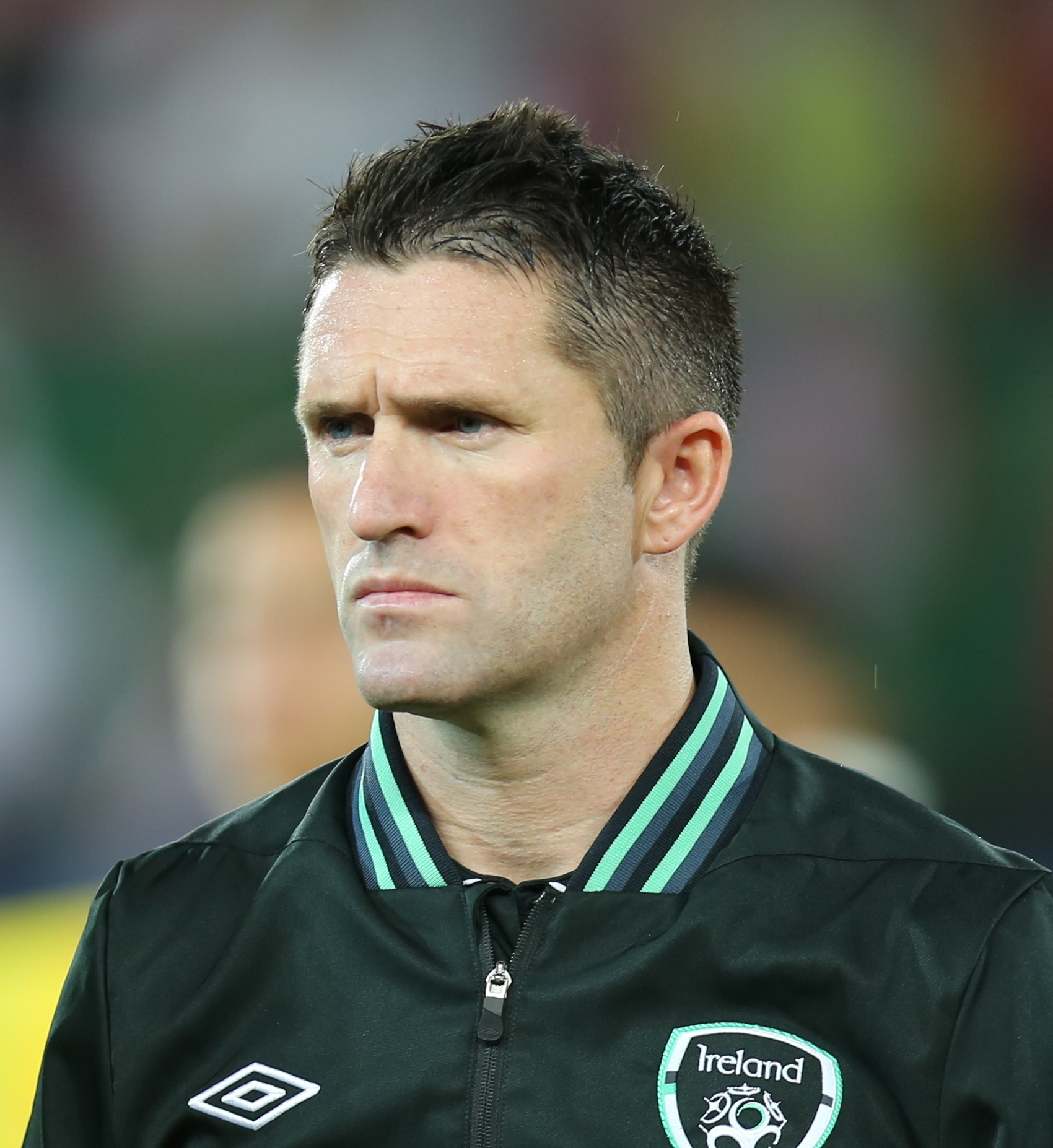
Robbie Keane holds the record for the most number of appearances and goals for the Republic of Ireland.

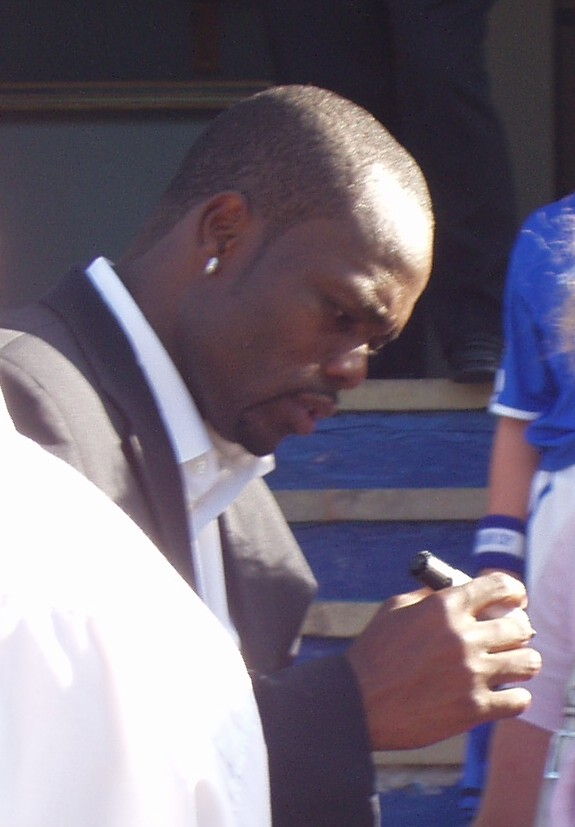
Stern John is the all-time top scorer for Trinidad and Tobago, and also second in the most appearances list.

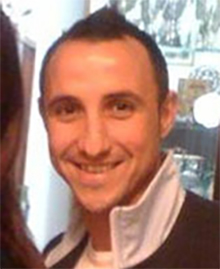
Michael Mifsud is Malta's all-time top-scorer, and has captained his country.

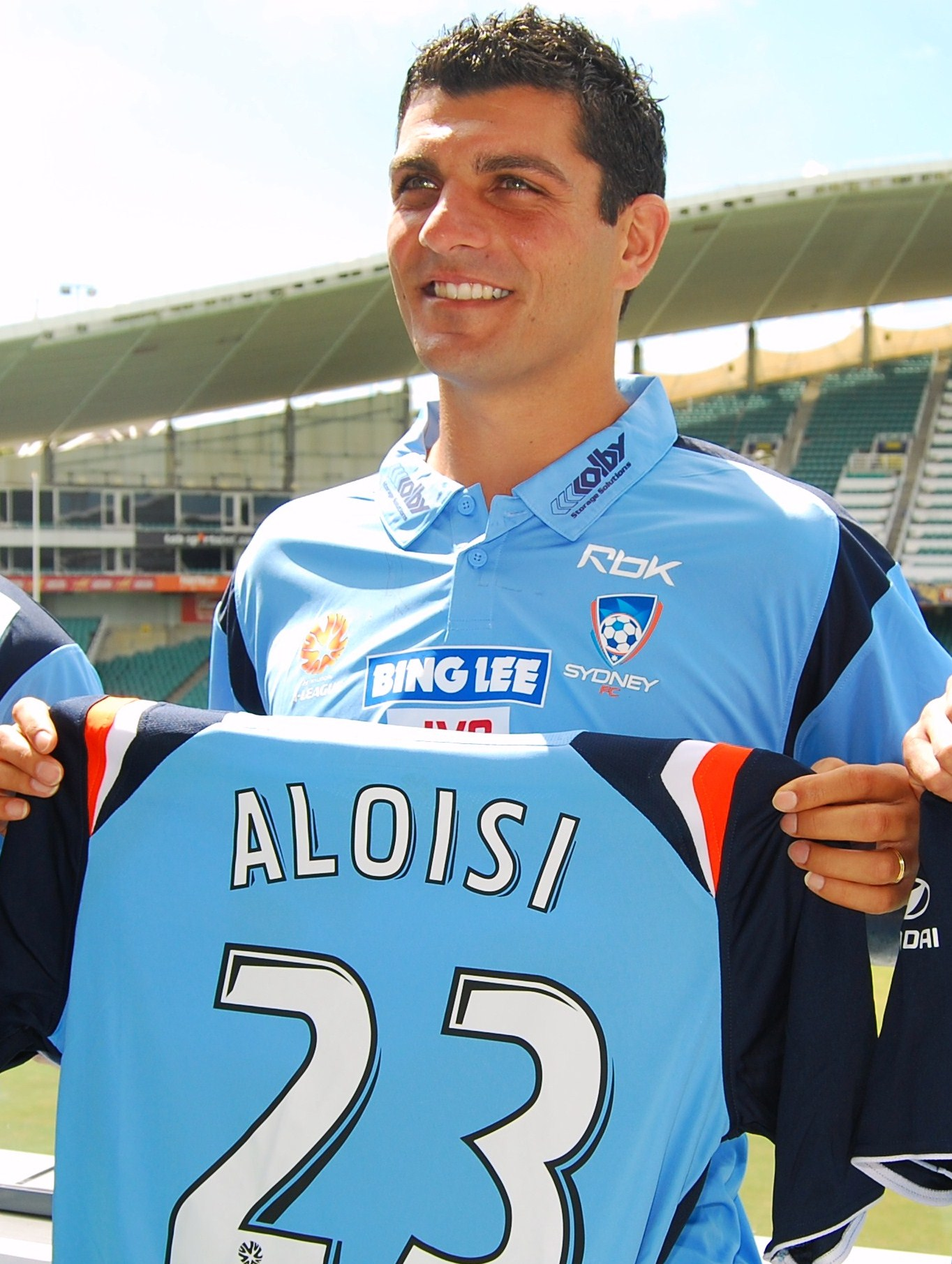
John Aloisi is Australia's fourth most prolific goalscorer of all time.

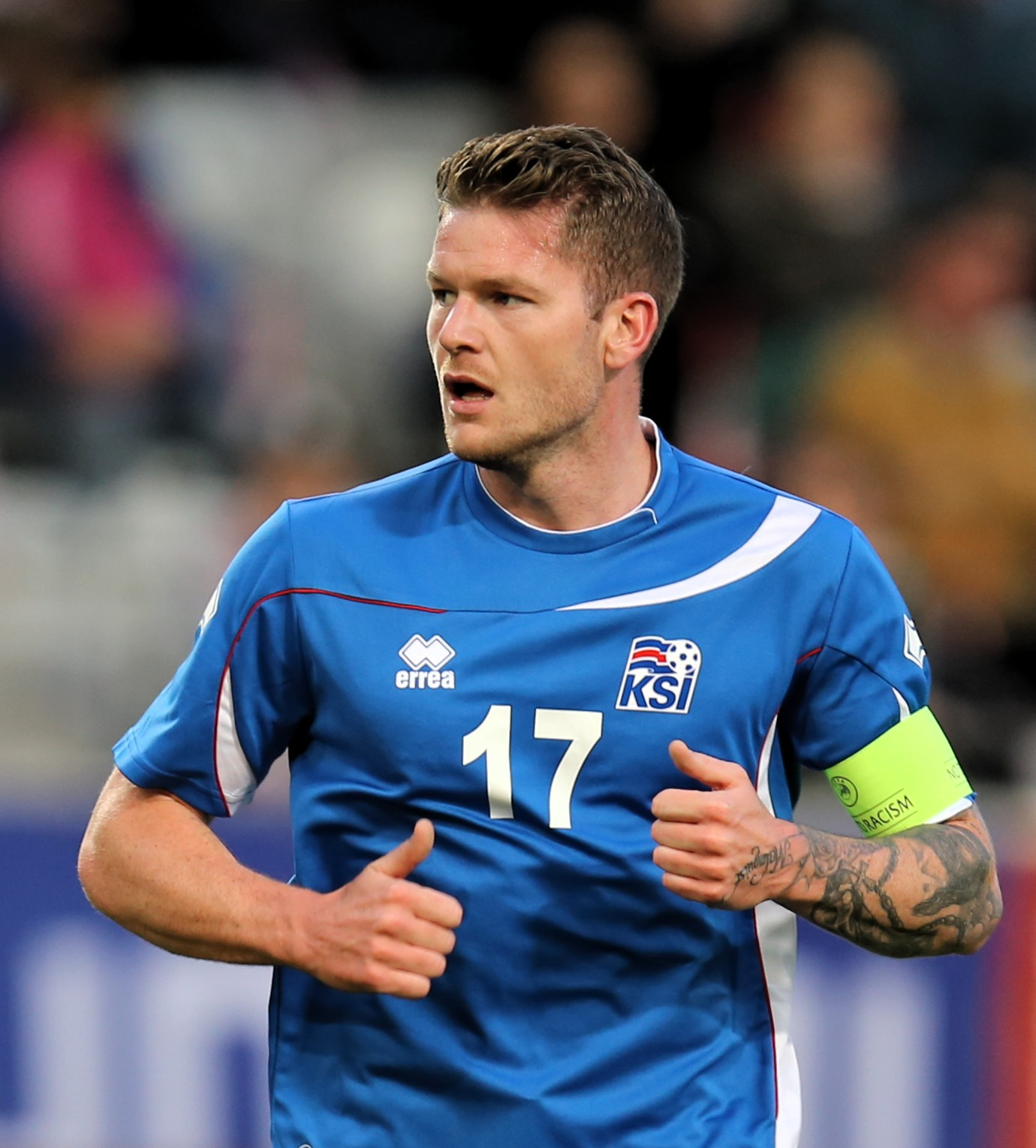
Aron Gunnarsson has captained the Iceland national football team.

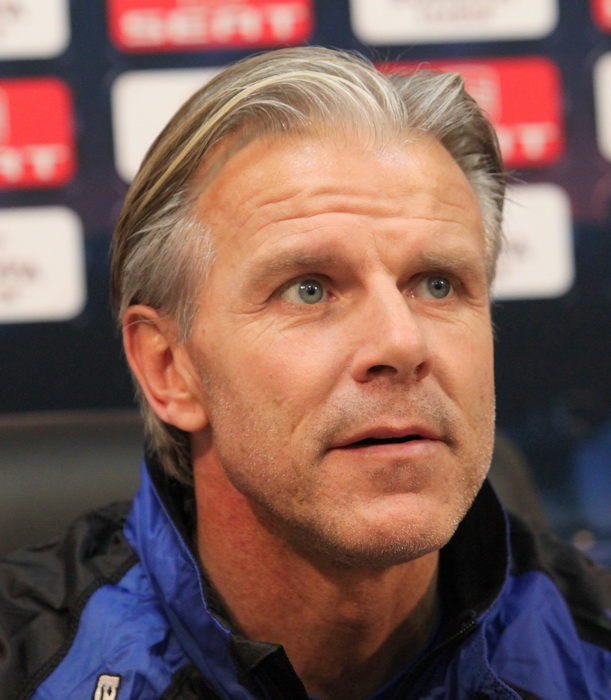
Roland Nilsson is sixth in the list of players with most appearances for Sweden.

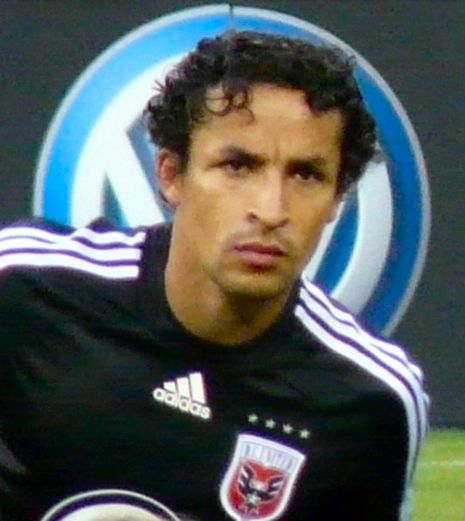
Iván Guerrero is tenth in the list of players with most appearances for Honduras.

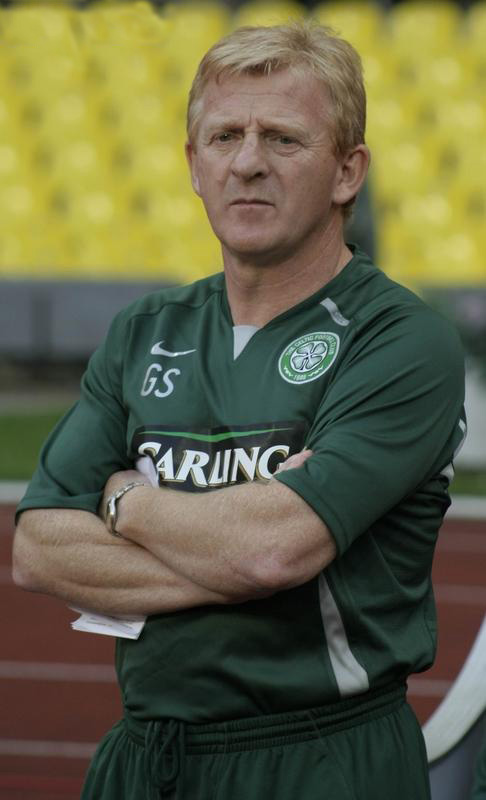
Gordon Strachan has played for and managed the Scotland national football team.

This is a list of past and present Coventry City players who have been capped by their country whilst at the club.

== Players to feature in a FIFA World Cup squad ==
| FIFA World Cup | Country | Player(s) |
|---|---|---|
| 1974 FIFA World Cup squads | Scotland | Tommy Hutchison |
| 1978 FIFA World Cup squads | Scotland | Jim Blyth |
| 1994 FIFA World Cup squads | Republic of Ireland | Phil Babb |
| 1994 FIFA World Cup squads | United States | Roy Wegerle |
| 1998 FIFA World Cup squads | Romania | Viorel Moldovan |
| 2002 FIFA World Cup squads | Republic of Ireland | Gary Breen |
| 2002 FIFA World Cup squads | Sweden | Magnus Hedman |
| 2006 FIFA World Cup squads | Trinidad and Tobago | Clayton Ince |
| 2006 FIFA World Cup squads | Trinidad and Tobago | Stern John |
| 2026 FIFA World Cup squads | Ghana | Brandon Thomas-Asante |
| 2026 FIFA World Cup squads | United States | Haji Wright |

== Players to feature in a UEFA European Championship squad ==
| UEFA European Championship | Country | Player(s) |
|---|---|---|
| UEFA Euro 1992 squads | Scotland | Kevin Gallacher |
| UEFA Euro 1996 squads | Scotland | Eoin Jess |
| UEFA Euro 2000 squads | Sweden | Tomas Antonelius |
| UEFA Euro 2000 squads | Sweden | Magnus Hedman |

== Players to feature in an African Cup of Nations squad ==
| African Cup of Nations | Country | Player(s) |
|---|---|---|
| 1996 African Cup of Nations squads | Ghana | Nii Lamptey |
| 2000 African Cup of Nations squads | Morocco | Youssef Chippo |
| 2000 African Cup of Nations squads | Morocco | Mustapha Hadji |
| 2002 African Cup of Nations squads | Morocco | Youssef Chippo |
| 2002 African Cup of Nations squads | Morocco | Youssef Safri |
| 2004 African Cup of Nations squads | Algeria | Yazid Mansouri |
| 2004 African Cup of Nations squads | Morocco | Youssef Safri |
| 2027 Africa Cup of Nations squads | | |

== Players with international cap(s) whilst at Coventry City ==
| Country | Player | Years capped^{[A]} |
|---|---|---|
| Algeria | Yazid Mansouri | 2004 |
| Australia | John Aloisi | 1998–2001 |
| Belgium | Norman Bassette | 2024– |
| Belgium | Philippe Clement | 1998–1999 |
| Benin | Réda Johnson | 2014 |
| Bosnia and Herzegovina | Muhamed Konjić | 1999–2004 |
| Canada | Simeon Jackson | 2014–2015 |
| England | Dion Dublin | 1998 |
| England | Reg Matthews | 1956 |
| England | Cyrille Regis | 1987 |
| England | Danny Thomas | 1983 |
| Faroe Islands | Claus Bech Jørgensen | 2004–2006 |
| Ghana | Nii Lamptey | |
| Ghana | Brandon Thomas-Asante | 2024– |
| Ghana | Caleb Yirenkyi | 2026– |
| Grenada | Greg Sandiford | 2024–2026 |
| Haiti | Duckens Nazon | 2017 |
| Honduras | Iván Guerrero | |
| Honduras | Jairo Martínez | |
| Iceland | Bjarni Guðjónsson | 2004 |
| Iceland | Aron Gunnarsson | 2008–2011 |
| Ireland (FAI) | Jackie Brown^{[B]} | 1937 |
| Ireland (IFA) | Jackie Brown^{[B]} | 1936–1938 |
| Ivory Coast | Yann Gboho | 2026– |
| Jamaica | Paul Hall | |
| Jamaica | Joel Latibeaudiere | 2023– |
| Jamaica | Onandi Lowe | 2004 |
| Jamaica | Ephron Mason-Clark | 2026– |
| Jamaica | Kasey Palmer | 2023–2024 |
| Japan | Tatsuhiro Sakamoto | 2026– |
| Malta | Michael Mifsud | 2007–2008 |
| Morocco | Youssef Chippo | 1999–2003 |
| Morocco | Mustapha Hadji | 1999–2001 |
| Morocco | Youssef Safri | 2001–2004 |
| New Zealand | Che Bunce | |
| Nigeria | Taiwo Awoniyi | 2026– |
| Nigeria | Frank Onyeka | 2026– |
| Northern Ireland | Hugh Barr | 1962 |
| Northern Ireland | Dave Clements | 1965–1971 |
| Northern Ireland | Sammy Clingan | 2009–2012 |
| Northern Ireland | Willie Humphries | 1962–1964 |
| Northern Ireland | Norman Lockhart | 1950–1952 |
| Northern Ireland | James McPake | |
| Northern Ireland | Oliver Norwood | 2012 |
| Northern Ireland | Michael O'Neill | 1996 |
| Norway | Leo Skiri Østigård | 2020 |
| Norway | Trond Egil Soltvedt | 1998 |
| Peru | Ysrael Zúñiga | |
| Republic of Ireland | Phil Babb | 1994 |
| Republic of Ireland | Graham Barrett | 2004 |
| Republic of Ireland | Leon Best | 2009 |
| Republic of Ireland | Gary Breen | 1997–2002 |
| Republic of Ireland | Lee Carsley | 2001 |
| Republic of Ireland | Liam Daish | 1996 |
| Republic of Ireland | Gerry Daly | 1980–1984 |
| Republic of Ireland | Michael Doyle | 2004 |
| Republic of Ireland | Ashley Grimes | 1984 |
| Republic of Ireland | Jimmy Holmes | 1971–1977 |
| Republic of Ireland | Robbie Keane | 1999–2000 |
| Republic of Ireland | Liam Kitching | 2026– |
| Republic of Ireland | Barry Quinn | 2000 |
| Republic of Ireland | Keiren Westwood | 2009–2011 |
| Romania | Viorel Moldovan | 1998 |
| Scotland | Jim Blyth | 1978 |
| Scotland | Willie Carr | 1970–1972 |
| Scotland | Kevin Gallacher | 1991–1992 |
| Scotland | Colin Hendry | 2000 |
| Scotland | Tommy Hutchison | 1973–1975 |
| Scotland | Eoin Jess | 1996 |
| Scotland | Gary McAllister | 1996–1999 |
| Scotland | David Speedie | 1988–1989 |
| Scotland | Colin Stein | 1973 |
| Scotland | Paul Telfer | 2000 |
| Scotland | Ian Wallace | 1978–1979 |
| Sierra Leone | Amadou Bakayoko | 2018 |
| Sweden | Tomas Antonelius | 2000 |
| Sweden | Viktor Gyökeres | 2021–2023 |
| Sweden | Magnus Hedman | 1998–2002 |
| Sweden | Roland Nilsson | 1997–1999 |
| Trinidad and Tobago | Chris Birchall | |
| Trinidad and Tobago | Clayton Ince | |
| Trinidad and Tobago | Stern John | 2004–2007 |
| Trinidad and Tobago | Justin Obikwu | 2024–2025 |
| United States | Gerry Baker | |
| United States | Cobi Jones | 1994–1995 |
| United States | Roy Wegerle | |
| United States | Haji Wright | 2024– |
| Wales | Bryn Allen | 1950 |
| Wales | Kai Andrews | 2025– |
| Wales | Craig Bellamy | 2000–2001 |
| Wales | Les Cartwright | 1974–1976 |
| Wales | Jay Dasilva | 2024– |
| Wales | Richard Duffy | 2005–2008 |
| Wales | Freddy Eastwood | 2008–2011 |
| Wales | Bob Evans | 1911–1912 |
| Wales | John Hartson | 2001 |
| Wales | Simon Haworth | 1997–1998 |
| Wales | Leslie Jones | 1935–1937 |
| Wales | George Lowrie | 1947–1948 |
| Wales | Donato Nardiello | 1977 |
| Wales | Rob Page | 2005 |
| Wales | David Phillips | 1987–1989 |
| Wales | David Pipe | 2003 |
| Wales | Ronnie Rees | 1964–1968 |
| Wales | Paul Trollope | 2002 |
| Wales | Terry Yorath | 1976–1979 |
| Zimbabwe | Peter Ndlovu | 1991–1997 |

== Footnotes ==
A. Years when the player had been capped by their country whilst at Coventry City.
B. Jackie Brown represented both the Irish Football Association and the Football Association of Ireland while both associations claimed jurisdiction over the whole of Ireland.
