= Lee Mills =

English footballer (born 1970)

Personal information
- Full name: Rowan Lee Mills
- Date of birth: 10 July 1970 (age 56)
- Place of birth: Mexborough, England
- Height: 6 ft 4 in (1.93 m)
- Position: Forward

Senior career*
Years	Team	Apps	(Gls)
1991–1992	Stocksbridge Park Steels		
1992–1995	Wolverhampton Wanderers	25	(2)
1995	→ Derby County (loan)	1	(1)
1995	Derby County	15	(6)
1995–1998	Port Vale	109	(35)
1998–2000	Bradford City	65	(29)
2000	→ Manchester City (loan)	3	(0)
2000–2001	Portsmouth	26	(4)
2001	→ Coventry City (loan)	8	(2)
2001–2003	Coventry City	30	(5)
2003	→ Stoke City (loan)	3	(1)
2003	Stoke City	8	(1)
2003–2004	Telford United	26	(9)
2004–2005	Hereford United	31	(7)
Total		350	(102)

Managerial career
- 2010–2011: Bridgnorth Town
- * Club domestic league appearances and goals

Rowan Lee Mills (born 10 July 1970) is an English former footballer who played as a striker.

In a 14-year career, he made 293 appearances in the Football League, scoring 86 goals. He played for numerous clubs and was transferred for some big money moves, totalling around £2 million. Arguably, his most successful period came at Port Vale and Bradford City in the late 1990s. He helped Vale to their highest post-war finish in the league, whilst he helped Bradford win promotion into the Premier League.

== Playing career ==
Born in Mexborough, Mills started his career with Stocksbridge Park Steels before being brought to the Football League with Wolverhampton Wanderers, and Derby County.

In July 1995, he joined John Rudge's Port Vale as Derby paid £475,000 plus Mills in exchange for Robin van der Laan. He made his debut for the "Valiants" as a substitute on 13 August 1995, in a goalless draw with Derby at The Baseball Ground. At the end of the season Derby were promoted, but Vale finished in twelfth spot. On 13 October 1996, he came off the bench at the Victoria Ground to score a last minute equaliser in a Potteries derby game with Stoke City. He finished the 1996–97 season with 15 goals and was handed the club's player of the year award as the club posted their highest post-war finish – eighth place in the First Division. During the 1997–98 season Mills was the club's top scorer with 16 goals, as Vale narrowly avoiding relegation.

"Three years at Port Vale is enough for anybody."

— By the time he signed with Bradford, Mills had had enough of the Potteries.

Mills became Bradford City's first £1 million player when Paul Jewell purchased him in preparation for the 1998–99 season. Mills made a large contribution to Bradford's promotion to the Premier League, becoming the club's top scorer with 24 goals. He also scored on his return to Vale Park, perhaps with a point to prove after a Port Vale matchday programme article described him as "poor" and his touch as "frequently awful". The 1999–2000 season was a poor one for Mills, scoring just six goals as he was troubled with injury and had a falling out with manager Paul Jewell. He spent March 2000 on loan with First Division Manchester City. His poor form left him labelled as a "forgotten man" when he scored twice in the 2000 UEFA Intertoto Cup against Lithuanian side FK Atlantas. New manager Chris Hutchings put Mills on a list of seven "underachievers", with a warning that a continuation of poor form would see those players released. Hutchings' reign lasted only a further four months. However, at that time, Hutchings had sold Mills to Portsmouth for a club-record £1.25 million to make way for Ashley Ward. Pompey later struggled to pay the fee and were put on a transfer embargo by the FA.

He scored five goals in 27 games during the 2000–01 season. He played just two games the following season before a one-month loan to Coventry City in December 2001, which soon turned into a £250,000 move at the end of the year. He aimed to fire the "Sky Blues" to the play-offs, though the season ended with Coventry occupying 11th spot. By some measure of irony, he played at Fratton Park in a Portsmouth shirt, Graham Barber having deemed both Coventry strips were too similar to Pompey's home strip, forced the side to borrow Portsmouth's orange away strip.

In July 2001, he broke his arm in a "freak" training ground incident, which came after recently recovering from a potentially career-threatening knee injury. He came back later in the season with "a bang", Mills saying: "I've come in and done OK and let's hope that continues." He was soon battling with an ankle injury, choosing to take injections to avoid time on the sidelines. In February 2003, following a one-month loan with Tony Pulis' Stoke City, where John Rudge was now Director of Football, he signed for the "Potters" permanently. The next month he was involved in a traffic collision on the M6 motorway and escaped with only minor injuries.

In July 2003, he signed with Telford United. Manager Mick Jones was delighted with the capture, stating: "I don't want to put too much pressure on Lee but I am hopeful he might have the same kind of impact as Alan Shearer had when he moved from Blackburn to Newcastle". After eleven goals in thirty games, Mills tore his ankle ligaments during a training accident, keeping him out of action for three months.

Following the collapse of Telford United, there was a race to Mills' signature, which was eventually won by Hereford United. Graham Turner having signed Mills, Mark Robinson and Jonathan Gould, looked to improve upon 2003–04's second-place finish, which saw the "Bulls" agonizingly close to automatic promotion to the Football League. Nine league goals from Mills in the 2004–05 season could not help United catch runaway champions Barnet, for a second consecutive season, they crashed out in the play-off semi-finals. Four of his goals had come in the first two months, despite starting just five matches. Mills was released after the semi-final defeat, as was fellow veteran Graham Hyde.

== Style of play ==
Mills was a strong forward who could head the ball well and kick with both feet.

== Managerial career ==
In December 2009, Mills was linked to the management position at Midland Football Alliance club Rocester.

In May 2010 he was confirmed as new manager of Midland Football Alliance club Bridgnorth Town. However, at the end of the 2010–11 season, Mills and his assistant Tony Dinning resigned from their posts at Bridgnorth Town, citing a wish to move on to a new challenge. After missing out on the vacant management position at Stafford Rangers, Mills was instead appointed as assistant manager at Bridgnorth's league rivals Ellesmere Rangers. He quit the club in January 2012, due to other commitments. He coached at Dudley College and was appointed as Academy team manager at Stourbridge in May 2018.

== Career statistics ==
Appearances and goals by club, season and competition
Club	Season	League			FA Cup		League Cup		Other (Note: Includes Anglo-Italian Cup, FA Trophy, and UEFA Intertoto Cup.)		Total	
Club	Season	Division	Apps	Goals	Apps	Goals	Apps	Goals	Apps	Goals	Apps	Goals
Wolverhampton Wanderers	1993–94	First Division	14	1	1	1	1	0	1	1	17	3
Wolverhampton Wanderers	1994–95	First Division	11	1	3	1	0	0	2	1	16	3
Wolverhampton Wanderers	Total		25	2	4	2	1	0	3	2	33	6
Derby County	1994–95	First Division	16	7	0	0	0	0	0	0	16	7
Port Vale	1995–96	First Division	32	8	2	0	2	1	6	4	42	13
Port Vale	1996–97	First Division	35	13	0	0	6	2	0	0	41	15
Port Vale	1997–98	First Division	42	14	1	0	2	2	0	0	45	16
Port Vale	Total		109	35	3	0	10	5	6	4	128	44
Bradford City	1998–99	First Division	44	24	2	1	4	0	0	0	50	25
Bradford City	1999–2000	Premier League	21	5	2	0	2	1	0	0	25	6
Bradford City	2000–01	Premier League	0	0	0	0	0	0	5	3	5	3
Bradford City	Total		65	29	4	1	6	1	5	3	80	34
Manchester City (loan)	1999–2000	First Division	3	0	0	0	0	0	0	0	3	0
Portsmouth	2000–01	First Division	24	4	0	0	3	1	0	0	27	5
Portsmouth	2001–02	First Division	2	0	0	0	0	0	0	0	2	0
Portsmouth	Total		26	4	0	0	3	1	0	0	29	5
Coventry City	2001–02	First Division	20	5	0	0	0	0	0	0	20	5
Coventry City	2002–03	First Division	18	2	1	1	3	3	0	0	22	6
Coventry City	Total		38	7	1	1	3	3	0	0	42	11
Stoke City	2002–03	First Division	11	2	0	0	0	0	0	0	11	2
Telford United	2003–04	Conference National	26	9	4	1	0	0	2	1	32	11
Hereford United	2004–05	Conference National	31	7	2	1	0	0	3	1	36	9
Career total			350	102	18	6	23	10	19	11	410	129

== Honours ==
Individual

- Port Vale F.C. Player of the Year: 1997

Bradford City

- Football League First Division second-place promotion: 1998–99
