= David Thompson (footballer, born 1977) =

English footballer (born 1977)

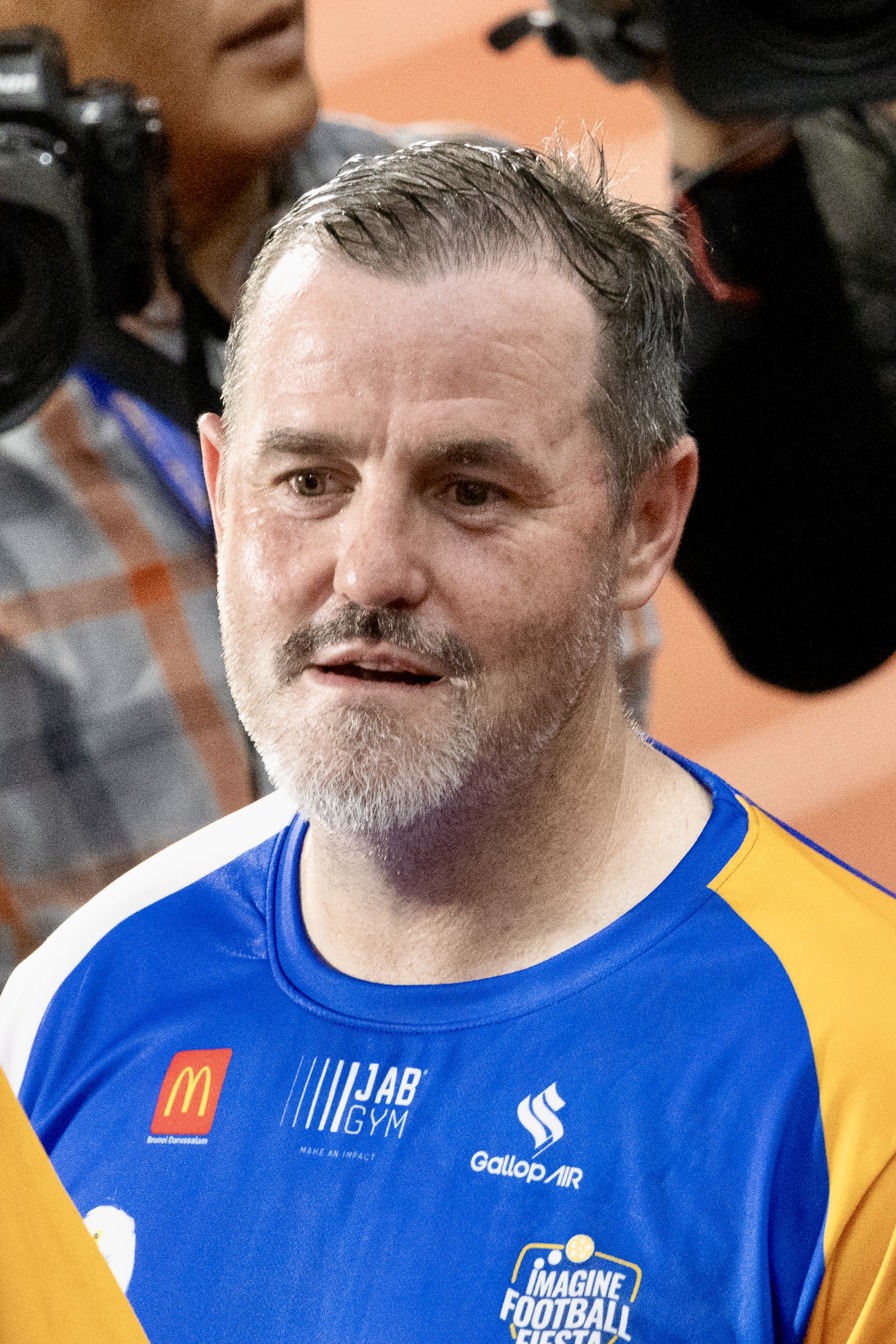
- Thompson in 2024

Personal information
- Full name: David Anthony Thompson
- Date of birth: 12 September 1977 (age 49)
- Place of birth: Birkenhead, Merseyside, England
- Position: Midfielder

Youth career
- 1993–1996: Liverpool

Senior career*
Years	Team	Apps	(Gls)
1996–2000	Liverpool	48	(5)
1997–1998	→ Swindon Town (loan)	10	(0)
2000–2002	Coventry City	69	(17)
2002–2006	Blackburn Rovers	65	(7)
2006	Wigan Athletic	10	(2)
2006–2007	Portsmouth	14	(0)
2007	Bolton Wanderers	8	(0)
Total		230	(32)

International career
1997–1999	England U21	7	(2)
- * Club domestic league appearances and goals

David Anthony Thompson (born 12 September 1977) is an English football pundit currently working for the BBC. Thompson played as a midfielder, though he had to retire aged 29 through an osteochondral defect of the left knee sustained at age 25. He is currently a UEFA A and B licensed coach working towards his professional licence. In August 2021, he became a director of football at Europa in the Gibraltar National League.

During his career Thompson played for Liverpool, Coventry City, Blackburn Rovers, Wigan Athletic, Portsmouth and Bolton Wanderers. Overall, he made well over 250 senior league appearances and international appearances until a persistent injury forced his early retirement in late 2007.

== Career ==
=== Liverpool ===
Born in Birkenhead, Merseyside, Thompson's Liverpool debut came on 19 August 1996, as an 87th-minute substitute in a 2–0 victory against Arsenal. He only played one more game before being loaned to Swindon Town for two and a half months in November 1997. His good form at Swindon led him to be selected more frequently for Liverpool, these performances paying off as he scored the winning goal against Crystal Palace later in the season. His 1997–98 and 1998–99 seasons were steady, and the 1999–00 season would see him back into the team on a regular basis.

=== Coventry City ===
In the summer of 2000 he moved to Coventry City for a fee of 3.5 million pounds his first game a 3–1 defeat to Middlesbrough in which he was sent off in the 71st minute. Coventry were relegated during the 2000–01 season, and he sought a move back to the Premiership. However, he stayed at Coventry throughout the 2001–02 season scoring 17 goals and assisting many more collecting the player of the year and fans player of the year award and also leading goal scorer award.

=== Blackburn Rovers ===
Blackburn Rovers signed Thompson for an initial fee of £1.5 million in August 2002. His rise in division and impressive start gave him immediate international recognition, as Sven-Göran Eriksson named him in the England squads against Slovakia and Macedonia in October, although ultimately he was never capped for the senior side.

Thompson suffered a knee injury which needed surgery in February 2003, sidelining him for five months. After a comeback in 2003–04, the problems returned with his knee swelling up after every game. The club's medical staff sent him to the world's top knee specialist Dr Richard Steadman in Colorado. Three separate bouts of surgery failed to provide a permanent solution as, despite a muscle strengthening programme directed by Bayern Munich doctor Hans-Wilhelm Müller-Wohlfahrt, the injuries persisted during his comebacks.

=== Wigan, Portsmouth & Bolton Wanderers ===
Blackburn allowed Thompson to leave on a free transfer to Wigan Athletic on 19 January 2006 on a six-month deal. His form was excellent for Wigan, scoring two goals and recording five assists in 10 games, helping them to their highest ever Premier League finish.

He left Wigan to join Harry Redknapp at Portsmouth and made 14 appearances in a successful start, before joining Bolton Wanderers and Sam Allardyce, who were in third place in the Premier League at the time. Bolton signed him just two hours before the transfer window shut on 31 January 2007 on a short-term deal. Thompson made his debut for Bolton as a substitute in the 2–1 victory against Fulham on 11 February, and subsequently made his first start for the club against his former employer Wigan Athletic on 7 April. He played six more matches for the rest of the 2006–07 season, before rejecting a pay as you play deal at Bolton.

In November 2007, Thompson started a trial with Championship club Sheffield United but failed to win a deal and, on 28 November 2007, announced his retirement at the age of 30 as a result of the chronic knee problem.

== Media ==
Thompson worked for BBC Radio Merseyside as a football pundit. He is now a regular on the Football Daily podcast produced by BBC Radio 5 Live.

== Career statistics ==
Source: David Thompson at the English National Football Archive (subscription required)

Appearances and goals by club, season and competition
Club	Season	League			FA Cup		EFL Cup		Other		Total	
Club	Season	Division	Apps	Goals	Apps	Goals	Apps	Goals	Apps	Goals	Apps	Goals
Liverpool	1996–97	Premier League	2	0	0	0	0	0	0	0	2	0
Liverpool	1997–98	Premier League	5	1	0	0	0	0	0	0	5	1
Liverpool	1998–99	Premier League	14	1	0	0	2	0	2 (Note: Appearances in UEFA Cup)	0	18	1
Liverpool	1999–2000	Premier League	27	3	1	0	3	0	—		31	3
Liverpool	Total		48	5	1	0	5	0	2	0	56	5
Swindon Town (loan)	1997–98	First Division	10	0	—		—		—		10	0
Coventry City	2000–01	Premier League	25	3	1	0	2	0	—		28	3
Coventry City	2001–02	First Division	37	12	1	0	2	1	—		40	13
Coventry City	2002–03	First Division	4	0	—		—		—		4	0
Coventry City	Total		66	15	2	0	4	1	—		72	16
Blackburn Rovers	2002–03	Premier League	23	4	2	0	4	1	3	1	32	6
Blackburn Rovers	2003–04	Premier League	11	1	0	0	1	0	2	0	14	1
Blackburn Rovers	2004–05	Premier League	24	0	6	2	0	0	—		30	2
Blackburn Rovers	2005–06	Premier League	6	0	1	0	1	1	—		8	1
Blackburn Rovers	Total		64	5	9	2	6	2	5	1	84	10
Wigan Athletic	2005–06	Premier League	10	2	—		—		—		10	2
Portsmouth	2006–07	Premier League	12	0	1	0	2	0	—		15	0
Bolton Wanderers	2006–07	Premier League	8	0	—		—		—		8	0
Career total			218	27	13	2	17	3	7	1	255	33
