= Ben Mackey =

English footballer

Personal information
- Full name: Ben Mackey
- Date of birth: 27 October 1986 (age 39)
- Place of birth: Leamington Spa, England
- Position: Forward

Team information
- Current team: Racing Club Warwick

Youth career
- Coventry City

Senior career*
Years	Team	Apps	(Gls)
2003–2005	Coventry City	3	(0)
2005	Linfield	4	(1)
2005–2006	Racing Club Warwick		
2006–2008	Leamington	76	(40)
2008–2010	Brackley Town	80	(44)
2010–2011	Corby Town		
2011	Brackley Town		
2011	Leamington	2	(0)
2011	Stratford Town		
2011	Evesham United		
2011–2012	St Neots Town	48	(42)
2012–2013	Stourbridge	12	(8)
2013–2014	Hemel Hempstead Town	49	(34)
2014–2015	St Neots Town		
2015–2016	Leamington		
2016–2018	Coventry United		
2018–2019	Racing Club Warwick	36	(37)
2019–2020	Coventry United		
2020–	Racing Club Warwick		
- * Club domestic league appearances and goals as of 22:00, 3 December 2019 (UTC)

Ben Mackey (born 27 October 1986) is an English professional footballer who plays for Racing Club Warwick.

== Playing career ==
Mackey started his career at Coventry City where he made three appearances. The first on 12 April 2003 against Ipswich Town meant that he was (and still is) the youngest player ever to take the pitch for the club's first team, aged 16 years and 167 days. At the start of the 2005–06 season Mackey had a trial with Linfield of the Irish Premier League. He made four appearances for them and scored one goal.

At the start of the 2006–07 season Mackey joined Leamington where he has had the chance to get more first team experience. That season he was Leamington's highest scorer and repeated the feat in 2007–08. 2007–08 saw him become the first player to sign a contract with the club since they reformed in 2000. This showed both the club's high regard for Mackey and his loyalty to the club after rumours that Nuneaton Borough of the Conference North were interested in signing him.

After 92 games and 57 goals Mackey moved to Brackley Town at the end of May 2008 (he was third top scorer in the league for 2007–08 with 24 goals), signing a two-year contract with the Southern League Premier Division outfit. He then signed for Conference North side Corby Town in June 2010 where he scored 10 league goals in the first half of the 2010/11 season before breaking his leg.

In November 2011, Mackey signed for Evesham United, who at the time played in the Southern Football League.

In 2011–12 he moved to St Neots Town and helped them win the Southern League Central Division title in 2011–12. The following season, he moved to Stourbridge and finished second highest scorer in the league with 29 goals. He then signed for Hemel Hempstead Town where he set the club record for number of goals scored in one season whilst helping them win the league title.

On 13 May 2015, it was announced that Mackey was returning to Leamington, initially for pre-season training but with the aim to play for them during the 2015–16 Southern Football League season. He finished the season as the club's top goal scorer with 15 in the league and six in cup matches.

Mackey started the 2016–17 season playing for Coventry United.

=== Racing Club Warwick ===
Mackey signed for Racing Club Warwick prior to the 2018–19 season.

The striker adapted to his new surroundings quickly and had an excellent start the season scoring 5 goals in his first 3 three games before picking up a minor injury against Coleshill Town which would keep him out until September. He then went on to score 14 goals in his next 10 games before going on a 4-game goal drought he ended the drought against Paget Rangers on 26 December 2018, Mackey went on to score another 18 goals from then until the end of the season which included 6 braces and a hat trick, Mackey finished the seasons the club's top goalscorer with 37 goals in all competitions and was instrumental in the club finishing 2nd in the Midland Football League Division One securing automatic promotion to the premier division it was the club's first promotion in over 30 years.

Following a spell with Coventry United, Mackey returned to Racing Club Warwick on 31 January 2020.
