= Tom Bates (footballer) =

English association football player

Personal information
- Full name: Thomas Bates
- Date of birth: 31 August 1985 (age 41)
- Place of birth: Coventry, England
- Height: 5 ft 10 in (1.78 m)
- Position: Midfielder

Youth career
- –2003: Coventry City

Senior career*
Years	Team	Apps	(Gls)
2003–2004	Coventry City	1	(0)
2007	Rochdale	2	(0)
- Barwell
- * Club domestic league appearances and goals as of 16:00, 7 July 2019 (UTC)

Thomas Bates (born 31 August 1985) is an English footballer who last played for Barwell, where he played as a midfielder.

== Playing career ==
=== Coventry City ===
Bates began his career at Championship side Coventry City, playing in their under-17s and being signed professionally as a 17-year-old. He attended the Woodlands school.

Bates made his debut on 12 April 2003, in a league fixture at home to Ipswich Town, which Ipswich won 4–2. Bates came on as a 77th-minute substitute for Craig Pead. He appeared for Coventry during a time in which the club was trying to save money by playing younger players on short-term incentive deals.

Bates appeared for Bedworth in 2004 after being picked up by United boss Mark Hallam. Bates also played for Rochdale, Nuneaton, Atherstone, and Leamington.
