= Eddie Stanford =

English footballer

Personal information
- Full name: Edward Stanford
- Date of birth: 1985 (age 40–41)
- Place of birth: Blackburn, England
- Height: 1.70 m (5 ft 7 in)
- Positions: Left-back; left winger

Senior career*
Years	Team	Apps	(Gls)
2002–2004	Coventry City	1	(0)
2003	→ Tamworth (loan)	7	(0)
2004	Legia Warsaw	1	(0)
2005	Ruch Chorzów	9	(0)
2005	Sandecja Nowy Sącz		
2006	Promień Żary		
2006–2007	Nelson		
2007	Chorley		
2007–2008	Curzon Ashton		
2008–2009	Burscough		
2009–2010	Radcliffe		
2010	Stalybridge Celtic	1	(0)
2011	Clitheroe		
- * Club domestic league appearances and goals

Edward Stanford (born 1985) is an English former professional footballer who played as a midfielder.

== Career ==
Stanford began his professional career at Coventry City where he had begun as a trainee. During a two-year term with the club, he managed only one first team appearance, coming on as a 73rd-minute substitute for Dean Gordon in a 2–0 away defeat by Millwall on 4 May 2003. He was released by Coventry at the end of the 2003–04 season. Stanford had a few short spells in Poland with clubs such as Legia Warsaw, Ruch Chorzów, Sandecja Nowy Sącz and Promień Żary.
