= Youssef Safri =

Moroccan footballer

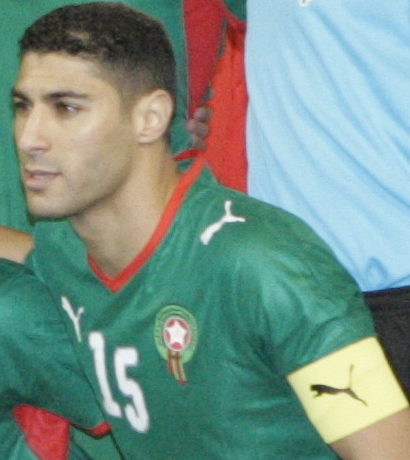
- Safri in 2009

Personal information
- Date of birth: 3 January 1977 (age 49)
- Place of birth: Casablanca, Morocco
- Height: 1.80 m (5 ft 11 in)
- Position: Midfielder

Team information
- Current team: KAC Marrakech (manager)

Youth career
- ????–1996: Rachad Bernoussi

Senior career*
Years	Team	Apps	(Gls)
1996–1998	Rachad Bernoussi	23	(1)
1998–2001	Raja CA	101	(11)
2001–2004	Coventry City	98	(1)
2004–2007	Norwich City	92	(4)
2007–2008	Southampton	39	(0)
2008–2013	Qatar SC	90	(8)
Total		443	(25)

International career
1997	Morocco U20	3	(0)
2000	Morocco U23	3	(0)
1999–2009	Morocco	79	(9)

Managerial career
- 2021–2023: Qatar SC
- 2024–2025: Qatar SC
- 2026–: KAC Marrakech
- * Club domestic league appearances and goals

Youssef Safri (Arabic: يوسف سفري, born 3 January 1977) is a Moroccan football coach and former player.

== Club career ==
Safri started his youth career at Rachad Bernoussi. The following year, he was promoted to the senior squad. He was a midfielder best known for his passing and tackling ability.

In August 2001, he joined Coventry City where he played until 2004, scoring once against Sheffield Wednesday. In December 2003, he had come under fire after breaking the leg of Sunderland player Colin Healy. The next season, he joined Norwich City for an initial fee of £500,000 in the summer of 2004, after the Canaries had been promoted to the Premier League.

Safri became popular among the Norwich fans towards the end of the 2004–05 campaign and during the 2005–06 season following a series of impressive performances. He scored a 40-yard strike against Shay Given of Newcastle United in April 2005 during the team's fight against relegation from the Premiership. Safri was linked with a move to Feyenoord in the summer of 2005, but stayed at Carrow Road.

Following the 3–1 defeat at Plymouth Argyle in September 2006, Safri and teammate Dickson Etuhu were reported to have traded punches on the team bus during their return journey to East Anglia, although these reports are now thought to have been discredited. After Peter Grant was appointed Norwich manager in October 2006, Safri was not a regular selection. There was speculation that he would leave the club in January 2007, fuelled by his comments in the Eastern Daily Press on 29 December 2006 in which Safri indicated that he would seek a transfer if Grant continued to use him as a substitute. Safri remained at Carrow Road until the end of the 2006–07 season, but after falling out with manager Peter Grant, Grant stated in the press on 1 August that Safri would not play for the club again.

On 2 August 2007 he signed for Norwich's championship rivals Southampton on a two-year contract for a fee rumoured to be of the order of £250,000. On 24 October 2007 he was sent off in the 90th minute of Southampton's away defeat to Bristol City, for a heavy tackle on Lee Johnson, whose subsequent reaction to Safri pushing him by all accounts was exaggerated, resulting in a straight Red.

On 7 July 2008 he joined Qatar Sports Club in a £300,000 transfer.

== International career ==
Safri was a key player with the Moroccan national team during the 2004 African Nations Cup, and was a member of the national squad competing at 1997 FIFA World Youth Championship, the 2000 Summer Olympics in Sydney. Safri qualified to play for Scotland through a maternal grandparent, but decided to play for his native Morocco, stating concerns about the Scottish weather.

== Coaching career ==
At the end of 2013 season he retired and started a role of assisting coach in his first club Raja CA. In the following 2015–16 season, he was assistant manager of Jamal Sellami at Difaâ Hassani El Jadidi.

In May 2018, Safri returned to Raja, again as assistant manager, this time under manager Juan Carlos Garrido. Garrido was sacked on 28 January 2019, and Safri was appointed caretaker manager. It lasted for two days, before Patrice Carteron was appointed. Safri however, left the club on 12 June 2019. In November 2019, Safri returned to Raja CA. Coached Islam Under-17s to a league title in 2017-18 and won Manager of the season.

== Career statistics ==
=== Club ===
Appearances and goals by club, season and competition
Club	Season	League			National cup (Note: Includes FA Cup)		League cup (Note: Includes Football League Cup)		Other		Total	
Club	Season	Division	Apps	Goals	Apps	Goals	Apps	Goals	Apps	Goals	Apps	Goals
Coventry City	2001–02	Championship	33	1	0	0	2	0	—		35	1
Coventry City	2002–03	Championship	27	0	0	0	2	0	—		29	0
Coventry City	2003–04	Championship	31	0	1	0	2	0	—		34	0
Coventry City	Total		91	1	1	0	6	0	0	0	98	1
Norwich City	2004–05	Premier League	18	1	0	0	2	1	—		20	2
Norwich City	2005–06	Championship	30	1	0	0	2	0	—		32	1
Norwich City	2006–07	Championship	35	1	4	0	1	0	—		40	1
Norwich City	Total		83	3	4	0	5	1	0	0	92	4
Southampton	2007–08	Championship	37	0	1	0	1	0	—		39	0
Qatar SC	2008–09	Qatar Stars League	22	3	Unknown						22	3
Qatar SC	2009–10	Qatar Stars League	17	0	Unknown						17	0
Qatar SC	2010–11	Qatar Stars League	19	2	Unknown						19	2
Qatar SC	2011–12	Qatar Stars League	15	0	Unknown						15	0
Qatar SC	2012–13	Qatar Stars League	17	3	Unknown						17	3
Qatar SC	Total		90	8	0	0	0	0	0	0	90	8
Career total			301	12	6	0	12	1	0	0	319	13

=== International ===
Appearances and goals by national team and year
National team	Year	Apps	Goals
Morocco	1999	1	0
Morocco	2000	8	0
Morocco	2001	12	0
Morocco	2002	9	1
Morocco	2003	4	0
Morocco	2004	10	2
Morocco	2005	4	1
Morocco	2006	7	0
Morocco	2007	5	0
Morocco	2008	14	5
Morocco	2009	5	0
Total		79	9

Scores and results list Morocco's goal tally first, score column indicates score after each Safri goal.

List of international goals scored by Youssef Safri
No.	Date	Venue	Opponent	Score	Result	Competition	Ref.
1	13 October 2002	Prince Moulay Abdellah Stadium, Rabat, Morocco	Equatorial Guinea	3–0	5–0	2004 African Cup of Nations qualification	
2	4 February 2004	Sousse Olympic Stadium, Sousse, Tunisia	South Africa	1–1	1–1	2004 African Cup of Nations	
3	5 June 2004	Chichiri Stadium, Blantyre, Malawi	Malawi	1–0	1–1	2006 FIFA World Cup qualification	
4	4 June 2005	Prince Moulay Abdellah Stadium, Rabat, Morocco	Malawi	1–1	4–1	2006 FIFA World Cup qualification	
5	7 June 2008	Nouakchott Olympic Stadium, Nouakchott, Mauritania	Mauritania	3–0	4–1	2010 FIFA World Cup qualification	
6	14 June 2008	Amahoro Stadium, Kigali, Rwanda	Rwanda	1–2	1–3	2010 FIFA World Cup qualification	
7	21 June 2008	Stade Mohammed V, Casablanca, Morocco	Rwanda	1–0	2–0	2010 FIFA World Cup qualification	
8	20 August 2008	Prince Moulay Abdellah Stadium, Rabat, Morocco	Benin	2–1	3–1	Friendly	
9	11 October 2008	Prince Moulay Abdellah Stadium, Rabat, Morocco	Mauritania	1–0	4–1	2010 FIFA World Cup qualification	

== Honours ==
Raja CA

- Moroccan League: 1998, 1999, 2000, 2001
- CAF Champions League: 1999
- CAF Super Cup: 2000

Qatar SC

- Qatar Crown Prince Cup: 2009

Morocco

- Africa Cup of Nations runner-up:2004
