= Craig Pead =

English footballer

Personal information
- Full name: Craig George Pead
- Date of birth: 15 September 1981 (age 45)
- Place of birth: Bromsgrove, England
- Height: 1.75 m (5 ft 9 in)
- Positions: Full back; central midfielder

Team information
- Current team: Barrow (assistant manager)

Youth career
- 1997–1998: Coventry City

Senior career*
Years	Team	Apps	(Gls)
1998–2005	Coventry City	42	(3)
2004	→ Notts County (loan)	5	(0)
2005	→ Walsall (loan)	8	(0)
2005–2007	Walsall	80	(0)
2007–2009	Brentford	38	(0)
2010	Coventry Sphinx	1	(0)
2010–2011	Redditch United	9	(0)
Total		183	(3)

International career
1999	England U18	3	(0)
2002	England U20	4	(0)
- * Club domestic league appearances and goals

Craig George Pead (born 15 September 1981) is an English former professional footballer who played as a full back in the Football League for Walsall, Coventry City, Brentford and Notts County. He was capped by England at youth level and later became a coach.

== Club career ==
=== Coventry City ===
A midfielder, Pead began his career in the youth system at Premier League club Coventry City in 1997 and signed his first professional contract in September 1998. While a teenager, Pead had an operation on his right knee, which removed 90% of the cartilage and the subsequent problems with the knee were so severe that he contemplated quitting football. After returning to fitness and being moved from left back to his preferred central midfield position, Pead finally made his senior debut when he played the opening 82 minutes of a 1–0 defeat to Burnley on 21 April 2002.

Pead broke into the squad during the 2002–03 season and was a regular inclusion from December 2002 through to the end of the campaign. He made 26 appearances and scored the first senior goal of his career, which came in a 2–2 draw with Preston North End on 5 April 2003. Pead's progress was rewarded with a new two-year contract in March 2003 and he was voted the club's 2002–03 Young Player of the Year.

Behind three loan midfielders in the pecking order and suffering with injuries, Pead had "a wasted" 2003–04 season, in which he made only 18 appearances, scoring one goal. A calf injury saw him sit out the opening month of the 2004–05 season and he subsequently spent much of the campaign away on loan. Pead was released in May 2005 and made 45 appearances and scored two goals during seven years as a professional at Highfield Road.

=== Walsall ===
On 23 March 2005, Pead joined League One strugglers Walsall on loan until the end of the 2004–05 season. He was an ever-present starter in the final eight league matches of the season and helped the Saddlers finish comfortably in mid-table. On 27 May 2005, Pead joined Walsall on a permanent basis and signed a two-year contract. He captained the team on occasion during a disastrous 2005–06 season, which ended with relegation to League Two.

Pead had an excellent 2006–07 season, making 45 appearances and winning the first silverware of his career when Walsall secured an immediate return to League One by winning the League Two championship. He was voted into the League Two PFA Team of the Year, but despite the accolade, Pead was not offered a new contract by manager Richard Money and was released in June 2007.

=== Brentford ===
On the recommendation of his former Walsall captain Michael Dobson, Pead joined newly relegated League Two club Brentford on a two-year contract on 2 July 2007. Less than three weeks later, he suffered an ankle ligament injury during a pre-season friendly and had to wait until 1 September to make his competitive debut for the Bees, which came in a 2–1 victory over Bury. He was utilised as a central midfielder by manager Terry Butcher, but after Butcher was replaced by Andy Scott in December 2007, Pead was moved to right back, which had come to be his preferred position. Despite making 35 appearances during the 2007–08 season and being voted into the League Two PFA Team of the Year for the second year in succession,

Pead was made available for transfer by manager Andy Scott in May 2008. He failed a medical at Port Vale in May and trialled with Cheltenham Town in July 2008 and remained with Brentford for the 2008–09 season. He began the season as a regular starter, but dropped to the bench in September 2008 and underwent exploratory surgery on his long-standing knee problem late in the year. Pead failed to return to fitness before the end of the season, but despite making just six league appearances, he was awarded a League Two championship medal. Pead was released in May 2009 and elected to retire, due to his long-standing knee problem. During his two seasons with Brentford, he made 44 appearances.

=== Coventry Sphinx ===
Pead came out of retirement to join Midland Alliance club Coventry Sphinx in August 2010. He made just one appearance for the club, in a 4–3 defeat to Friar Lane & Epworth on 10 August.

=== Redditch United ===
Pead joined Conference North club Redditch United in August 2010 and made 12 appearances during the 2010–11 season.

== International career ==
Pead was capped by England at U18 and U20 level. He was a part of the U20 squad which finished fourth at the 2002 Toulon Tournament.

== Coaching career ==
On 14 August 2021, Pead joined Southern League Premier Division Central club Banbury United as first team coach under manager Andy Whing. He later followed Whing, as his assistant, to National League club Solihull Moors and then to League Two club Barrow.

== Personal life ==
Pead's father worked as a kit man at Coventry City. Whilst a player at Brentford, Pead shared a flat in Feltham with Lee Thorpe. After his retirement from football in 2009, Pead returned to the West Midlands and opened Soccer Rockz, a youth football coaching school. He later worked as Business Development Manager for BPMpro, as a personal trainer and as an FA-registered intermediary.

== Career statistics ==
Appearances and goals by club, season and competition
Club	Season	League			FA Cup		League Cup		Other		Total	
Club	Season	Division	Apps	Goals	Apps	Goals	Apps	Goals	Apps	Goals	Apps	Goals
Coventry City	1999–00	Premier League	0	0	0	0	0	0	—		0	0
Coventry City	2001–02	First Division	1	0	0	0	0	0	—		1	0
Coventry City	2002–03	First Division	24	1	2	0	0	0	—		26	1
Coventry City	2003–04	First Division	17	1	0	0	1	0	—		18	1
Coventry City	2004–05	Championship	0	0	0	0	0	0	—		0	0
Coventry City	Total		42	2	2	0	1	0	—		45	2
Notts County (loan)	2004–05	League Two	5	0	—		0	0	1 (Note: Appearances in Football League Trophy)	0	6	0
Walsall (loan)	2004–05	League One	8	0	—		—		—		8	0
Walsall	2005–06	League One	39	0	4	0	1	0	3	0	47	0
Walsall	2006–07	League Two	41	0	1	0	2	0	1	0	45	0
Walsall	Total		88	0	5	0	3	0	4	0	100	0
Brentford	2007–08	League Two	32	0	2	0	0	0	1	0	35	0
Brentford	2008–09	League Two	6	0	1	0	1	0	1	0	9	0
Brentford	Total		38	0	3	0	1	0	2	0	44	0
Coventry Sphinx	2010–11	Midland Alliance	1	0	—		—		—		1	0
Redditch United	2010–11	Conference North	9	0	2	0	—		1 (Note: Appearance in Birmingham Senior Cup)	0	12	0
Career total			183	2	12	0	5	0	7	0	204	2

== Honours ==
Walsall

- Football League Two: 2006–07

Individual

- PFA Team of the Year: 2006–07 League Two, 2007–08 League Two
- Coventry City Young Player of the Year: 2002–03
- Coventry City Academy Hall of Fame
