= Jay Bothroyd =

English footballer (born 1982)

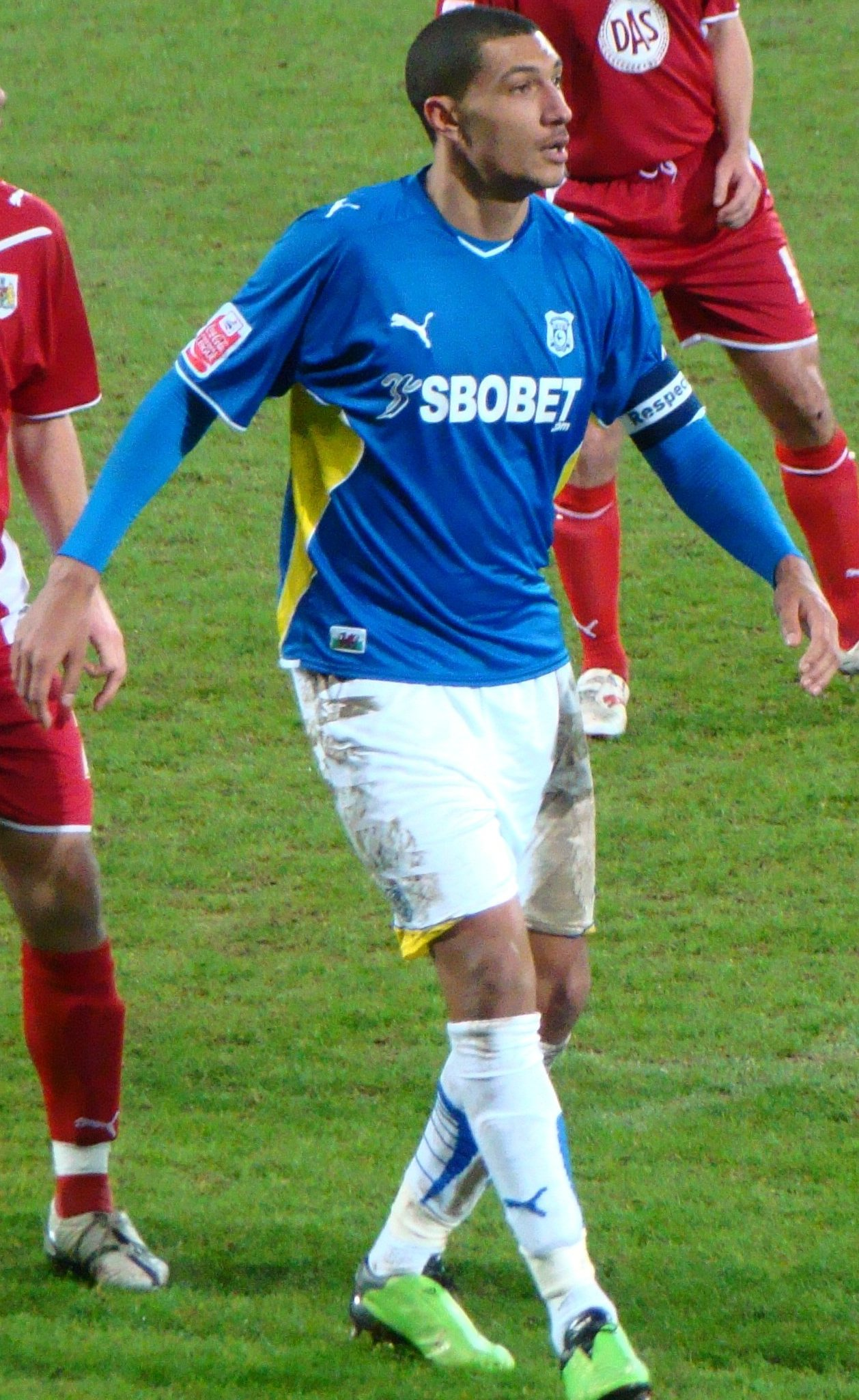
- Bothroyd playing for Cardiff City in 2010

Personal information
- Full name: Jay Bothroyd
- Date of birth: 5 May 1982 (age 44)
- Place of birth: Islington, London, England
- Height: 6 ft 3 in (1.91 m)
- Position: Striker

Youth career
- 1995–2000: Arsenal

Senior career*
Years	Team	Apps	(Gls)
2000–2003	Coventry City	72	(14)
2003–2005	Perugia	26	(4)
2004–2005	→ Blackburn Rovers (loan)	11	(1)
2005–2006	Charlton Athletic	18	(2)
2006–2008	Wolverhampton Wanderers	55	(12)
2008	→ Stoke City (loan)	4	(0)
2008–2011	Cardiff City	116	(41)
2011–2013	Queens Park Rangers	25	(3)
2012–2013	→ Sheffield Wednesday (loan)	14	(1)
2014	Muangthong United	16	(6)
2015–2016	Júbilo Iwata	54	(34)
2017–2021	Hokkaido Consadole Sapporo	107	(35)
Total		518	(153)

International career
1999	England U16	2	(1)
2000–2001	England U18	2	(0)
2001–2002	England U20	2	(0)
2001	England U21	1	(1)
2010	England	1	(0)
- * Club domestic league appearances and goals

Jay Bothroyd (born 5 May 1982) is an English former professional footballer who played as a striker.

A product of the Arsenal Academy, he left in 2000 and signed with Coventry City, spending three years with the Sky Blues and becoming the club's top-scorer with 11 goals during the 2002–03 season. His form attracted attention from Serie A's Perugia, and he signed with the club in 2003. He later returned to the UK and played for Blackburn Rovers, Charlton Athletic, Wolverhampton Wanderers, Stoke City, Cardiff City, Queens Park Rangers and Sheffield Wednesday.

In 2014, Bothroyd began playing in Asia, first in Thailand for Muangthong United, and later in Japan for Júbilo Iwata and Hokkaido Consadole Sapporo. He also played for the England national team, earning his only cap in 2010.

== Club career ==
=== Coventry City ===
Bothroyd was born in Islington, London. He started his career in Arsenal's Academy, and played in their win against Coventry City in the 1999–2000 FA Youth Cup Final. At 18 years of age, Bothroyd was sold to Coventry after throwing his shirt at youth coach Don Howe and the bench, having been substituted in the 2000 Premier League Youth Cup final against West Ham United. Despite having never played a first-team match for Arsenal, he cost Coventry £1 million when he joined them on 13 July 2000. His league debut came on 4 November 2000 in a 2–1 home defeat to Manchester United in the Premier League.

In the three years he played for Coventry, he scored seventeen goals in total, despite making little impact in his first season, after making his debut against Preston North End in the League Cup. Bothroyd only featured for Coventry after many other members of the squad had to be sold off to relieve the club's financial problems. He scored his debut goal in a defeat against Bradford City on 24 August 2001, and in the 2002–03 season became the club's top-scorer with 11 goals.

=== Perugia ===
Bothroyd's form for Coventry brought interest from Perugia, and he transferred to the Serie A club when his Coventry contract expired in 2003.

Bothroyd was a mainstay for Perugia during their 2003–04 season, competing in the majority of their league matches, but he was unsettled in Italy. He joined Blackburn Rovers in August 2004 on loan from Perugia. After getting sent off against Norwich City for violent conduct, after kicking opposing midfielder Mattias Jonson, he was unable to cement a place in the first team and returned to Perugia at the end of the season. He did manage to score once in the league for Blackburn, during a 2–2 draw with Liverpool in October 2004. In 2008, Bothroyd held an interview with the South Wales Echo where he revealed that he, along with other teammates, was the subject of regular racist abuse while playing in Italy.

During his time at Perugia, he befriended then-Libyan leader Muammar Gaddafi's third son, Al-Saadi Gaddafi. In October 2011, shortly after the dictator's death, he spoke to The Daily Telegraph about his experiences as Al-Saadi's friend.

=== Charlton Athletic ===
Bothroyd signed for Charlton Athletic on 31 August 2005, after being released by Perugia due to their financial problems. While at Charlton, he scored twice, in games against Manchester City and Newcastle United.

Bothroyd was then taken on trial at Crystal Palace, but the club decided not to offer him a contract. Bothroyd later denied he was on trial with Crystal Palace, despite playing in Crystal Palace's pre-season tour of the United States.

=== Wolverhampton Wanderers ===
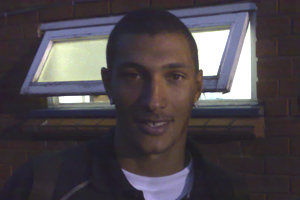
Bothroyd in 2008

Bothroyd joined Wolverhampton Wanderers on 26 July 2006, becoming Mick McCarthy's first full signing for the club.

Bothroyd started the season in fine style, scoring three goals for his new club in their first six fixtures, including a 25-yard strike in injury time away at Leeds United to grab all three points. However, in the following match against Derby County, his fortunes took a turn for the worse as he had a penalty saved in a match that Wolves lost 1–0.

Bothroyd's goal scoring petered out after this initial burst and he suffered an injury in December that kept him out of the busy Christmas period, though he returned to the squad in February 2007 and made several substitute appearances. The most vital of these came when he scored the winning goal as Wolves beat their bitter Black Country rivals West Bromwich Albion 1–0 in a crucial encounter in the race for promotion.

The striker had to settle for a place on the bench for the start of the 2007–08 season. He was eventually given a start against his former club Charlton, where he scored one and created one in a 2–0 win and kept his starting place for the next three matches, scoring Wolves' only goal of the match against Bristol City in a 1–1 draw.

After Wolves signed new strikers Sylvan Ebanks-Blake and brought in Kevin Kyle on loan during the January transfer window, Bothroyd found himself out of first team contention. To gain playing time, he moved to fellow Championship club Stoke City on an initial one-month loan on 14 March 2008, later extended to the end of the season, which ended in promotion to the Premier League. However, after featuring in just four matches during his loan spell, he returned to his parent club who promptly put him up for transfer.

=== Cardiff City ===
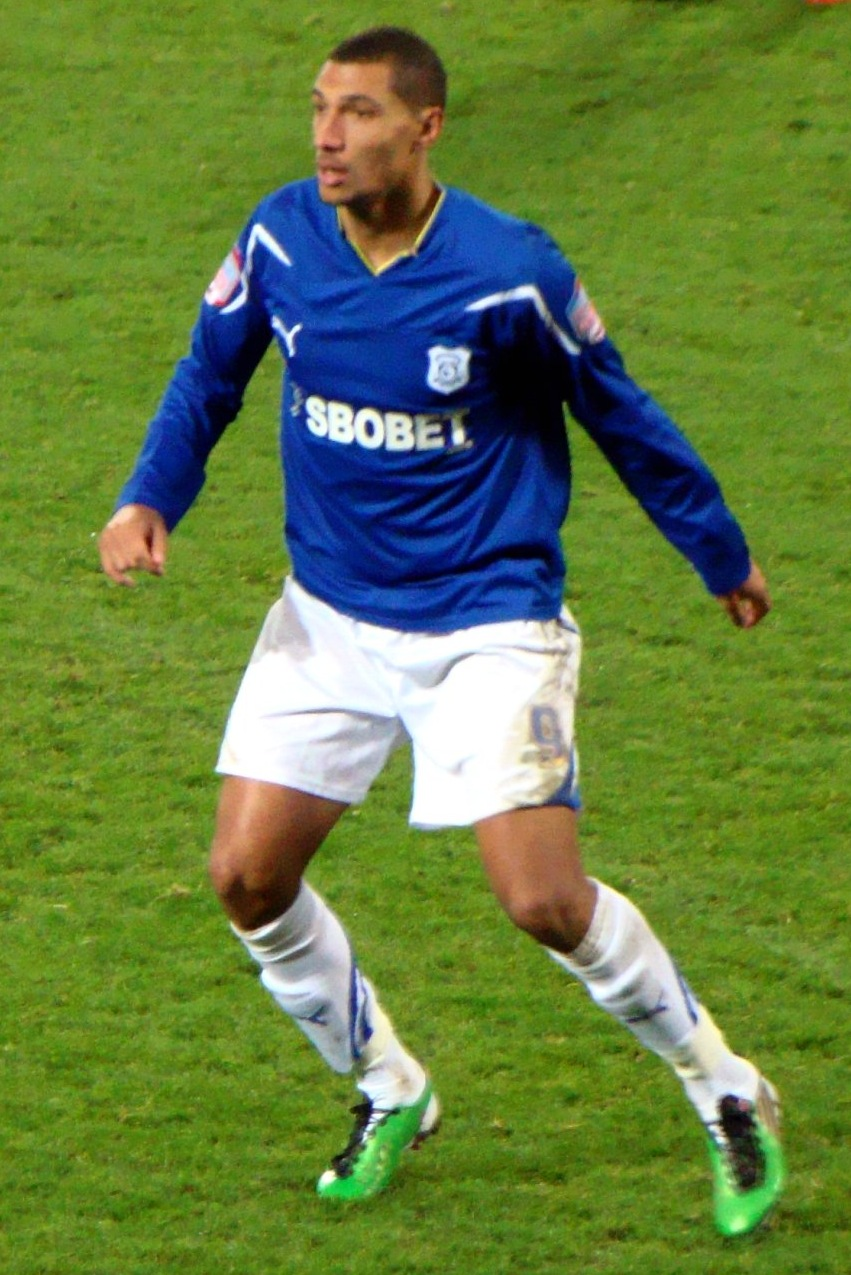
Bothroyd playing for Cardiff City in 2010

Bothroyd remained in the Championship, joining Cardiff City, who beat off interest from newly promoted Premier League club Hull City, on 4 August 2008 in a three-year contract for a fee of £350,000. At the start of the season Bothroyd found himself in and out of the team as manager Dave Jones attempted to find his best strike partnership and, after a number of matches, Bothroyd assumed the role of first choice strike partner to Ross McCormack. On 30 September 2008, Bothroyd scored his first goal for the club when he found the net against one of his former clubs, Coventry City during a 2–1 win. It took Bothroyd just under a month to find the net again for the club when he scored twice during a 2–2 draw at Watford. Bothroyd continued in the first team but, on 1 November, he suffered a tear of his hamstring after just 13 minutes of a 2–1 defeat against Wolverhampton Wanderers, which was expected to rule him out for between six and eight weeks.

He made his return to the team ahead of schedule after three weeks when he played 66 minutes during a 2–2 draw with Reading before being replaced by Eddie Johnson. After returning to match fitness, Bothroyd found the net three times in six matches during December, scoring against Burnley, Ipswich Town and Plymouth Argyle, a record which saw him finish as runner-up behind Reading's Stephen Hunt in the Championship player of the month award. Bothroyd finished the season with 12 goals, but could not prevent Cardiff from slipping out of the playoffs.

Bothroyd made a bright start to the 2009–10 season, scoring the second goal in the first ever league match at the Cardiff City Stadium in a 4–0 victory over Scunthorpe United. He celebrated his 50th league appearance for Cardiff City by scoring the fourth goal in a 4–0 win over Watford on 3 October 2009, and scored in the next away match against Sheffield United, which Cardiff won 4–3. Between 24 October and 7 November 2009, Bothroyd enjoyed his most prolific scoring run with Cardiff, scoring in three consecutive matches against Sheffield United, Nottingham Forest and Swansea City. With club captain Mark Hudson injured, Bothroyd took over as captain on several occasions during the second half of the season and scored a total of 13 goals in all competitions, the highest single season total of his career, as Cardiff reached the play-off final where he was forced off after 15 minutes due to injury.

Bothroyd started the 2010–11 season in good form, scoring 15 goals in 16 appearances in all competitions. He was also nominated for August's Championship Player of the Month but lost out to Queens Park Rangers' Adel Taarabt. He won the player of the month for October 2010. On 23 April 2011, Bothroyd scored a fantastic long range goal against league leaders QPR, later after the match, there were many wondering if he meant to cross instead of going for goal but Bothroyd claimed he went for goal. On 23 May 2011, Bothroyd left Cardiff City after failing to agree a new contract.

=== Queens Park Rangers ===
On 13 July 2011, Bothroyd signed for newly promoted Premier League club Queens Park Rangers on a three-year contract. He made his debut on the opening day of the season, playing the full 90 minutes of a 4–0 defeat at home to Bolton Wanderers. He scored his first goal on 30 October, in a 3–1 defeat away to Tottenham Hotspur. He scored his second goal in the following match, opening the scoring in a 3–2 defeat at home to eventual league winners Manchester City. After his loan spell at Sheffield Wednesday expired, he returned to Loftus Road and made his comeback as a half time substitute in the third round of the FA Cup against West Bromwich Albion, in a match which finished 1–1, before scoring the only goal in the replay between the teams to take QPR to the fourth round of the competition.

Bothroyd was released by QPR on 20 June 2013.

=== Sheffield Wednesday ===
On 31 August 2012, Bothroyd signed on loan to Sheffield Wednesday until 2 January 2013, in a move that saw him re-united with former manager Dave Jones, who he had worked with for three years at Cardiff City. He made his debut on 14 September, playing 87 minutes of a 3–0 defeat to Brighton & Hove Albion before being replaced by Gary Madine. He scored his only goal for the club on 19 October in a 1–1 draw at home to Leeds United.

=== Muangthong United ===
On 8 January 2014, Bothroyd ended a six-month period of free agency by signing a two-year contract with Muangthong United of the Thai Premier League. He made his competitive debut the following month, playing the full match as Muangthong lost to Buriram United in the Kor Royal Cup. His first goal for the club came on 8 February 2014, in a 2014 AFC Champions League qualifying match against Hà Nội T&T.

=== Júbilo Iwata ===
In February 2015, Bothroyd signed for J2 League club Júbilo Iwata. He scored two goals on his debut in a 3–1 win against Giravanz Kitakyushu. In the 2015 season, he was the top scorer in the J2 League. This aided his team to achieve promotion to Japan's top league, the J1 League.

=== Hokkaido Consadole Sapporo ===
In July 2017, Bothroyd signed for J1 League club Hokkaido Consadole Sapporo. In August 2019, he scored a hat-trick in a 8–0 win over Shimizu S-Pulse.

== International career ==
As a youngster Bothroyd represented England at several youth levels, getting as far as the under-21 team. He won one cap for the team during a friendly against Mexico at Filbert Street, scoring during the match with a spectacular overhead kick as England won 3–0.

In October 2008, it was revealed that Bothroyd was on the verge of a possible call-up to play for Jamaica as he qualifies through his grandparents.

In April 2010, Guyana were interested in calling-up Bothroyd, whom qualifies for the nation through his parents.

On 13 November 2010, Bothroyd was called up to the England squad for the friendly against France. He appeared as a second-half substitute in the 2–1 defeat, becoming Cardiff City's first England international in their 111-year history, and the first Football League player to represent England since David Nugent in 2007.

== Style of play ==
Dave Jones described Bothroyd as a player who can "drift, he's got good ability and good pace."

== Media career ==
For Season Two of the Apple TV series Ted Lasso, assistant director Sophie Worger hired former professional player Kasali Casal to manage the soccer choreography. Casal enlisted a team of former professional players to play for the opposition teams facing AFC Richmond during game scenes, these included Bothroyd and fellow former Premier League players and Lee Hendrie, Jermaine Pennant and George Elokobi.

== Personal life ==
Bothroyd was diagnosed with epilepsy as a teenager and takes lamotrigine twice daily. He did not take the condition seriously until he was 26 and had a seizure that caused him to drive into someone's garden. He has scarring on the front of his brain, but does not want to get surgery to remove it unless his seizures worsen.

== Career statistics ==
=== Club ===
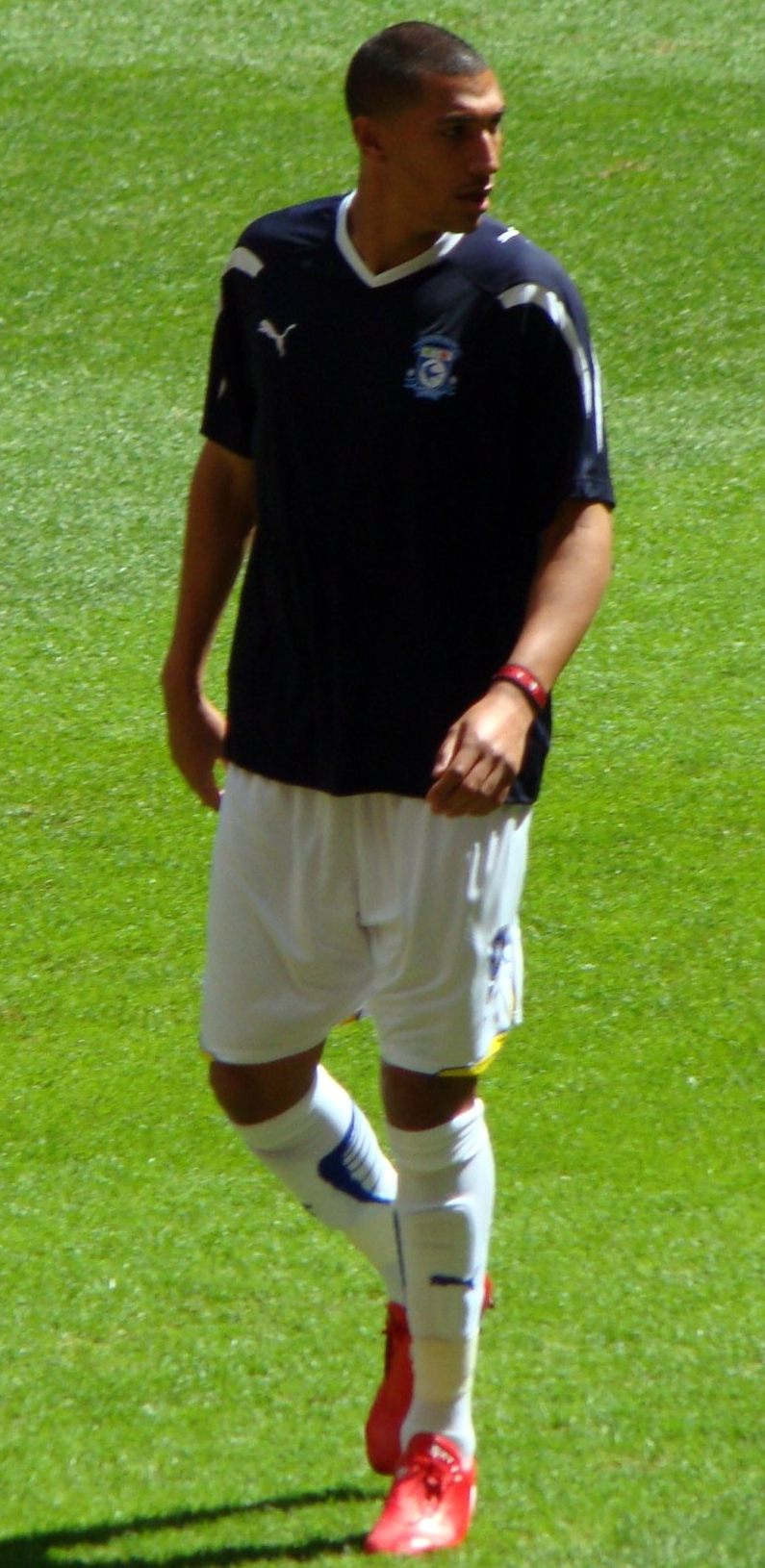
Bothroyd training with Cardiff City before the 2010 Championship play-off final

As of 27 November 2021

Appearances and goals by club, season and competition
Club	Season	League			National cup (Note: Includes FA Cup, Coppa Italia, Emperor's Cup)		League cup (Note: Includes Football League Cup, J.League Cup)		Other		Total	
Club	Season	Division	Apps	Goals	Apps	Goals	Apps	Goals	Apps	Goals	Apps	Goals
Coventry City	2000–01	Premier League	8	0	1	0	1	0	—		10	0
Coventry City	2001–02	First Division	31	6	1	0	2	0	—		34	6
Coventry City	2002–03	First Division	33	8	3	1	3	2	—		39	11
Coventry City	Total		72	14	5	1	6	2	—		83	17
Perugia	2003–04	Serie A	26	4	1	1	—		12 (Note: Six appearances and two goals in UEFA Intertoto Cup, four appearances in UEFA Cup, two appearances in relegation playoffs)	2	39	7
Blackburn Rovers (loan)	2004–05	Premier League	11	1	1	0	1	0	—		13	1
Charlton Athletic	2005–06	Premier League	18	2	4	2	3	1	—		25	5
Wolverhampton Wanderers	2006–07	Championship	33	9	0	0	0	0	2 (Note: Appearances in Championship play-offs)	0	35	9
Wolverhampton Wanderers	2007–08	Championship	22	3	3	1	0	0	—		25	4
Wolverhampton Wanderers	Total		55	12	3	1	0	0	2	0	60	13
Stoke City (loan)	2007–08	Championship	4	0	—		—		—		4	0
Cardiff City	2008–09	Championship	39	12	3	0	2	0	—		44	12
Cardiff City	2009–10	Championship	40	11	3	1	2	1	3	0	48	13
Cardiff City	2010–11	Championship	37	18	0	0	2	2	2	0	41	20
Cardiff City	Total		116	41	6	1	6	3	5	0	133	45
Queens Park Rangers	2011–12	Premier League	21	2	2	0	1	0	—		24	2
Queens Park Rangers	2012–13	Premier League	4	1	3	2	0	0	—		7	3
Queens Park Rangers	Total		25	3	5	2	1	0	—		31	5
Sheffield Wednesday (loan)	2012–13	Championship	14	1	—		—		—		14	1
Muangthong United	2014	Thai Premier League	16	6	?	?	?	?	3 (Note: Appearances in AFC Champions League and Kor Royal Cup)	1	19	7
Júbilo Iwata	2015	J2 League	32	20	0	0	—		—		32	20
Júbilo Iwata	2016	J1 League	22	14	0	0	2	1	—		24	15
Júbilo Iwata	Total		54	34	0	0	2	1	—		56	35
Hokkaido Consadole Sapporo	2017	J1 League	14	10	—		0	0	—		14	10
Hokkaido Consadole Sapporo	2018	J1 League	24	9	2	2	0	0	—		26	11
Hokkaido Consadole Sapporo	2019	J1 League	23	9	0	0	7	1	—		30	10
Hokkaido Consadole Sapporo	2020	J1 League	22	6	—		2	1	—		24	7
Hokkaido Consadole Sapporo	2021	J1 League	24	1	0	0	5	0	—		29	1
Hokkaido Consadole Sapporo	Total		107	35	2	2	14	2	—		133	39
Career total			518	153	27	10	33	9	22	3	600	175

=== International ===
As of match played 17 November 2010

Appearances and goals by national team and year
National team	Year	Apps	Goals
England	2010	1	0
Total		1	0

== Honours ==
Arsenal

- FA Youth Cup: 1999–2000

Perugia

- UEFA Intertoto Cup: 2003

Muangthong United

- Kor Royal Cup runner-up: 2014

Júbilo Iwata

- J2 League runner-up: 2015

Hokkaido Consadole Sapporo

- J.League Cup runner-up: 2019
