= Avun Jephcott =

English footballer

Avun Bunyan Jephcott
Personal information
- Full name: Avun Bunyan Jephcott
- Date of birth: 16 October 1983 (age 43)
- Place of birth: Coventry, England
- Height: 6 ft 2 in (1.88 m)
- Position: Midfielder

Youth career
- –2003: Coventry City

Senior career*
Years	Team	Apps	(Gls)
2003–2004	Coventry City	3	(0)
2003	→ Tamworth (loan)	12	(?)
2004	→ Notts County (loan)	7	(?)
2004–2005	Nuneaton Borough	?	(?)
2005	Rugby Town	?	(?)
2005–2006	Ards	8	(3)
2006	Linfield	?	(?)
2006–2007	Stratford Town	?	(?)
2007	Leamington	26	(8)
2007–2008	Woodford United	?	(?)
2008–2009	Worcester City	?	(?)
2009–2012	Coventry Alvis	?	(?)
2012–2014	Tividale	?	(?)
2014–2017	Hinckley	27	(0)
2017	Coventry United		
2017–	Coventry Alvis		
- * Club domestic league appearances and goals as of 10:24, 3 May 2015 (UTC)

Avun Bunyan Jephcott (born 16 October 1983 in Coventry, England) is a footballer and plays as a midfielder.

== Career ==
While a young prodigy at Coventry City, Jephcott was pursued by fellow Premier League clubs Aston Villa, Everton and Leeds United. However, a cruciate ligament injury that Jephcott sustained in a reserve game against Leigh RMI, scared off potential buyers and the player moved to non-league football, having appeared a handful of times from the bench for Coventry City in the Premier League and League Cup, and having spent loan spells with Tamworth and Notts County. Jephcott had spells in the Irish League at Ards and Linfield before joining Larne in January 2008. Jephcott returned to the English non league scene, and became a much travelled player, taking in spells at Nuneaton Borough, Leamington, Corby Town, Worcester City, Chasetown and Halesowen Town amongst others.

Following a spell at Wolverhampton Casuals in 2014, Jephcott followed manager Carl Abbott and fellow players John Melligan and Matt Bailey in signing for Hinckley AFC in May 2014.

== Education ==
He was studying for a BA in Spanish Literature at Oxford.
