= Mark Noon =

English footballer and manager

Personal information
- Date of birth: 23 September 1983 (age 43)
- Place of birth: Royal Leamington Spa, England
- Positions: Defender; midfielder

Senior career*
Years	Team	Apps	(Gls)
2001–2004	Coventry City	2	(0)
2004	Tamworth	7	(0)
2004–2014	Nuneaton Town		

Managerial career
- 2014: Nuneaton Town (caretaker)
- 2014: Nuneaton Town (caretaker)
- * Club domestic league appearances and goals as of 14:56, 28 March 2017 (UTC)

Mark Noon (born 23 September 1983) is an English professional footballer who played as a defender or a midfielder. He is assistant manager at AFC Telford United.

== Career ==
Born in Royal Leamington Spa, Noon began his career at Coventry City, making two appearances in the Football League for them.

He later played in non-league football for Tamworth and Nuneaton Town.

Noon signed for Nuneaton in the summer of 2004, and he signed a new one-year contract with the club in April 2006. He signed a further contract in June 2008, before extending once again in June 2009. In December 2009 Noon, who was club captain, was described by manager Kevin Wilkin as a key player for the team. In May 2011 Noon signed another new contract with the club. In July 2012 Noon suffered a broken leg in a pre-season friendly game. On 11 December 2013, Noon was named as Nuneaton's assistant manager. Following Wilkin's appointment as Wrexham manager on 20 March 2014, Noon took over as caretaker manager. On 9 September 2014, Noon was once again appointed caretaker manager of Nuneaton after manager Brian Reid left the club.
