= Fabien Debec =

French footballer (born 1976)

Personal information
- Date of birth: 18 January 1976 (age 50)
- Place of birth: Lyon, France
- Position: Goalkeeper

Senior career*
Years	Team	Apps	(Gls)
- Olympique Lyonnais B
1996–2002	Stade Rennais F.C.	19	(0)
2002–2003	Coventry City F.C.	11	(0)
2003–2004	AS Saint-Étienne	1	(0)
2004–2005	Grenoble Foot 38	15	(0)
2005–2007	LB Châteauroux	10	(0)
2007–2008	AS Cannes	26	(0)
2008–2009	Sporting Club Toulon	23	(0)
2009–2011	US Langueux		
2011–20xx	Lamballe Football Club		
- * Club domestic league appearances and goals

Fabien Debec (born 18 January 1976) is a French retired footballer who played as a goalkeeper for Coventry City in the English First Division (second tier) and for multiple teams in his home country.

Debec now works as goalkeeper coach at the Ploufragan youth training center as well as a volunteer for FC Lamballe.
