= Sean Cooney =

Irish soccer player

- Born: 31 October 1983 (age 42)
- Occupation: soccer player.

Sean Cooney (born 31 October 1983) is an Irish soccer player.

A central defender, Cooney started his career at Coventry City and has also played for Woking, Bohemians and Finn Harps. He has represented the Republic of Ireland at Under-21 level, making his debut against Italy in February 2004. Sean is now a youth soccer coach in Texas.
