= Youssef Chippo =

Moroccan footballer (born 1973)

Personal information
- Date of birth: 10 May 1973 (age 53)
- Place of birth: Boujad, Morocco
- Height: 1.84 m (6 ft 0 in)
- Position: Midfielder

Senior career*
Years	Team	Apps	(Gls)
1991–1995	KAC Kénitra		
1995–1996	Al-Hilal		
1996–1997	Al Arabi		
1997–1999	Porto	30	(2)
1999–2003	Coventry City	122	(6)
2003–2005	Al Sadd		
2005–2006	Al-Wakrah		
Total		152+	(8+)

International career
1992	Morocco U23	1	(0)
1996–2006	Morocco	73	(9)
- * Club domestic league appearances and goals

Youssef Chippo (Arabic: يوسف شيبو; born 10 May 1973) is a Moroccan former footballer. He was a renowned midfielder for the Morocco national team during the 1990s, and was a member of the team that participated in the 1992 Summer Olympics in Barcelona and the 1998 FIFA World Cup.

== Club career ==
Born in Boujad, Chippo began his career at KAC Kénitra. He spent two seasons at Porto where he began to display his talent in Europe.

In 1999, he signed for Coventry City in the Premier League where he played alongside fellow Moroccan international Mustapha Hadji in midfield. Coventry City were relegated in his second season, but he remained at the club for two more years. With Coventry City in financial trouble and looking to offload players, Chippo joined the Qatari side Al Sadd on a six-month loan on 11 April 2003. The loan was cancelled early at the end of June. However, he played at Al Sadd until 2005.

On 24 February 2007, it was reported that Hibernian would be taking Chippo on trial. In October 2007, Swedish club Hammarby also gave him a trial, but he was not offered a contract.

== International career ==
Chippo was selected for the Morocco squads for the 1992 Summer Olympics, the 1998 FIFA World Cup, where he started three matches but scored an own goal against Norway, and four African Cup of Nations squads between 1998 and 2006. He missed the 2004 African Nations Cup in Tunisia after falling out with the team's coach, Ezzaki Badou, but was recalled by Mohamed Fakhir for the 2006 tournament. He retired from international competition after the tournament, having won 62 caps.

== Personal life ==
Chippo is now a television football analyst. He is also a businessman. He works as a TV presenter and sports analyst for beIN Sports MENA in Doha, Qatar.

Chippo also runs a football academy to help players reach their potential.

== Career statistics ==
Scores and results list Morocco's goal tally first, score column indicates score after each Chippo goal.

List of international goals scored by Youssef Chippo
No.	Date	Venue	Opponent	Score	Result	Competition
1	5 February 1998	Stade El Harti, Marrakesh, Morocco	Niger	2–0	3–0	Friendly
2	3 October 1998	Mohamed V Stadium, Casablanca, Morocco	Sierra Leone	1–0	3–0	2000 African Cup of Nations qualification
3	10 April 1999	Mohamed V Stadium, Casablanca, Morocco	Togo	1–0	1–1	2000 African Cup of Nations qualification
4	28 April 1999	GelreDome, Arnhem, Netherlands	Netherlands	1–0	2–1	Friendly
5	8 October 2000	Mohamed V Stadium, Casablanca, Morocco	Kenya	1–0	1–0	2002 African Cup of Nations qualification
6	25 March 2001	Prince Moulay Abdellah Stadium, Rabat, Morocco	Tunisia	1–0	2–0	2002 African Cup of Nations qualification
7	12 December 2001	Settat, Morocco	Mali	1–0	1–1	Friendly
8	7 September 2002	Stade Omar Bongo, Libreville, Gabon	Gabon	1–0	1–0	2004 African Cup of Nations qualification
9	8 June 2003	Mohamed V Stadium, Casablanca, Morocco	Sierra Leone	1–0	1–0	2004 African Cup of Nations qualification

== Honours ==
Porto

- Primeira Liga: 1997–98, 1998–99
- Taça de Portugal: 1997–98
- Supertaça Cândido de Oliveira: 1998

Al Sadd

- Qatar Stars League: 2004
