= 2005–06 Deportivo Alavés season =

Deportivo Alavés
2005–06 season
- President: Dmitry Piterman
- Head coach: Chuchi Cos (until 8 January); Juan Carlos Oliva (10 January to 16 February); Mario Luna (from 18 February)
- Stadium: Mendizorrotza
- La Liga: 18th (relegated)
- Copa del Rey: Third round
- Top goalscorer: League: John Aloisi (10); All: John Aloisi (10)

The 2005–06 season was the 84th season in the existence of Deportivo Alavés, and the club's first season back in the top flight of Spanish football after winning promotion from the 2004–05 Segunda División. In addition to the domestic league, Alavés participated in this season's edition of the Copa del Rey. The season covered the period from 1 July 2005 to 30 June 2006.

== First-team squad ==
Retrieved on 10 May 2021

Note: Flags indicate national team as defined under FIFA eligibility rules; some limited exceptions apply. Players may hold more than one non-FIFA nationality.

| No. | Pos. | Nation | Player |
|---|---|---|---|
| 1 | GK | ARG | Franco Costanzo |
| 2 | DF | ESP | David Coromina |
| 3 | DF | ARG | Mauricio Pellegrino |
| 4 | DF | ESP | Juanito |
| 5 | DF | ESP | Josu Sarriegi |
| 6 | DF | ESP | Ibon Begoña |
| 6 | DF | ESP | Óscar Téllez |
| 7 | DF | ESP | Lluís Carreras |
| 8 | FW | URU | Antonio Pacheco (on loan from Albacete Balompié) |
| 9 | FW | ESP | Rubén Navarro |
| 10 | MF | ESP | Quique de Lucas |
| 11 | FW | SEN | Pape Thiaw |
| 12 | DF | ESP | Gaspar Gálvez |
| 13 | GK | FRA | Nicolas Ardouin |
| 14 | MF | BRA | Élton Giovanni |

| No. | Pos. | Nation | Player |
|---|---|---|---|
| 15 | MF | ESP | Santiago Carpintero |
| 16 | DF | ESP | Poli |
| 17 | MF | ESP | Edu Alonso |
| 18 | MF | ARG | Martín Astudillo |
| 19 | FW | EQG | Rodolfo Bodipo |
| 19 | FW | ESP | Gabri |
| 20 | FW | ESP | José María Mena |
| 21 | MF | ESP | Jandro |
| 22 | FW | AUS | John Aloisi |
| 23 | MF | BRA | Nenê |
| 24 | FW | BRA | Arthuro |
| 25 | GK | ARG | Roberto Bonano |
| 26 | MF | ALG | Mehdi Lacen |
| 28 | MF | BUL | Blagoy Georgiev (on loan from PFC Slavia Sofia) |

=== Left club during season ===
Retrieved on 10 May 2021

Note: Flags indicate national team as defined under FIFA eligibility rules; some limited exceptions apply. Players may hold more than one non-FIFA nationality.

| No. / Pos. / Nation / Player; — / MF / BRA / Wesley (on loan to Vitória de Guimarães) | No. / Pos. / Nation / Player; — / FW / GAB / Henri Antchouet (on loan to Vitória de Guimarães) |

=== Out on loan for the full season ===
Retrieved on 10 May 2021

Note: Flags indicate national team as defined under FIFA eligibility rules; some limited exceptions apply. Players may hold more than one non-FIFA nationality.

| No. | Pos. | Nation | Player |
|---|---|---|---|
| — | DF | ESP | Ángel Sánchez (on loan at Ciudad de Murcia) |

== Transfers ==
=== In ===
| # | Pos | Player | From | Notes |
Summer
| 1 | GK | (Argentina) Franco Costanzo | (Argentina) River Plate | |
| 3 | DF | (Argentina) Mauricio Pellegrino | (England) Liverpool | Free |
| 4 | DF | (Spain) Juanito | (Spain) Málaga | |
| 6 | DF | (Spain) Ibon Begoña | (Spain) Gimnàstic de Tarragona | |
| 12 | DF | (Spain) Gaspar Gálvez | (Spain) Albacete Balompié | |
| 16 | DF | (Spain) Poli | (Spain) Mallorca | |
| 19 | FW | (Spain) Gabri | (Spain) Haro Deportivo | Loan return |
| 20 | FW | (Spain) José María Mena | (Spain) Xerez | |
| 21 | MF | (Spain) Jandro | (Spain) Celta Vigo | |
| 22 | FW | (Australia) John Aloisi | (Spain) Osasuna | Free |
| 24 | FW | (Brazil) Arthuro | (Spain) Sporting de Gijón | Free |
| | MF | (Brazil) Wesley | (Portugal) F.C. Penafiel | |
| | FW | (Gabon) Henri Antchouet | (Portugal) Belenenses | |
Winter
| 8 | FW | (Uruguay) Antonio Pacheco | (Spain) Albacete Balompié | Loan |
| 14 | MF | (Brazil) Élton Giovanni | (Brazil) Santos | Free |
| 28 | MF | (Bulgaria) Blagoy Georgiev | (Bulgaria) PFC Slavia Sofia | Loan |

=== Out ===
| # | Pos | Player | To | Notes |
Summer
| 1 | GK | (Spain) Juan Pablo | (Spain) Numancia | |
| 3 | DF | (Spain) Ángel Sánchez | (Spain) Ciudad de Murcia | Loan |
| 4 | MF | (Argentina) Maximiliano Flotta | (Colombia) Unión Magdalena | Loan return |
| 8 | FW | (Spain) Kiko Lacasa | (Spain) Polideportivo Ejido | |
| 11 | MF | (Spain) David Sánchez | (Spain) Albacete Balompié | Loan return |
| 12 | MF | (Equatorial Guinea) Juvenal | (Spain) Recreativo de Huelva | |
| 14 | MF | (Spain) Nacho Fernández | (Spain) Racing de Ferrol | |
| 16 | DF | (Spain) Abel Valenzuela | (Spain) Salamanca | |
| 20 | FW | (Equatorial Guinea) Juan Epitié | (Spain) Castellón | Free |
| 21 | MF | (Spain) Álex Lombardero | (Spain) Gramenet | |
| 22 | FW | (Spain) Sergio Santamaría | (Spain) Barcelona | Loan return |
| 24 | MF | (Senegal) Pape Sarr | (France) Lens | Loan return |
| 28 | MF | (Spain) Edu Aguilar | (Spain) Reus | |
| 32 | FW | (Spain) Nacho Rodríguez | (Spain) Real Oviedo | |
| 36 | MF | (Spain) Santi Amaro | (Spain) Extremadura | |
| | FW | (Spain) Jacinto Elá | (Scotland) Dundee | |
Winter
| | MF | (Brazil) Wesley | (Portugal) Vitória de Guimarães | Loan |
| | FW | (Gabon) Henri Antchouet | (Portugal) Vitória de Guimarães | Loan |

== Competitions ==
=== Overview ===
| Competition | First match | Last match | Starting round | Final position | Record | | | | | | | |
| Competition | First match | Last match | Starting round | Final position | Pld | W | D | L | GF | GA | GD | Win % |
|---|---|---|---|---|---|---|---|---|---|---|---|---|
| La Liga | 27 August 2005 | 13 May 2006 | Matchday 1 | 18th (relegated) | 38 | 9 | 12 | 17 | 35 | 54 | −19 | 23.68 |
| Copa del Rey | 19 October 2005 | 19 October 2005 | Third round | Third round | 1 | 0 | 0 | 1 | 0 | 1 | −1 | 0.00 |
| Total | | | | | 39 | 9 | 12 | 18 | 35 | 55 | −20 | 23.08 |

=== La Liga ===
==== League table ====
| Pos | Team | Pld | W | D | L | GF | GA | GD | Pts | Qualification or relegation |
|---|---|---|---|---|---|---|---|---|---|---|
| 16 | Real Sociedad | 38 | 11 | 7 | 20 | 48 | 65 | −17 | 40 | |
| 17 | Racing Santander | 38 | 9 | 13 | 16 | 36 | 49 | −13 | 40 | |
| 18 | Alavés (R) | 38 | 9 | 12 | 17 | 35 | 54 | −19 | 39 | Relegation to the Segunda División |
| 19 | Cádiz (R) | 38 | 8 | 12 | 18 | 36 | 52 | −16 | 36 | Relegation to the Segunda División |
| 20 | Málaga (R) | 38 | 5 | 9 | 24 | 36 | 68 | −32 | 24 | Relegation to the Segunda División |

Source: LFP
Rules for classification: 1st points; 2nd head-to-head points; 3rd head-to-head goal difference; 4th head-to-head goals scored; 5th goal difference; 6th number of goals scored; 7th Fair-play points
(R) Relegated

==== Results summary ====
| Overall | | | | | | | | Home | | | | | | Away | | | | | |
| Pld | W | D | L | GF | GA | GD | Pts | W | D | L | GF | GA | GD | W | D | L | GF | GA | GD |
|---|---|---|---|---|---|---|---|---|---|---|---|---|---|---|---|---|---|---|---|
| 38 | 9 | 12 | 17 | 35 | 54 | −19 | 39 | 6 | 6 | 7 | 20 | 24 | −4 | 3 | 6 | 10 | 15 | 30 | −15 |

==== Results by round ====
| Round | 1 | 2 | 3 | 4 | 5 | 6 | 7 | 8 | 9 | 10 | 11 | 12 | 13 | 14 | 15 | 16 | 17 | 18 | 19 | 20 | 21 | 22 | 23 | 24 | 25 | 26 | 27 | 28 | 29 | 30 | 31 | 32 | 33 | 34 | 35 | 36 | 37 | 38 |
|---|---|---|---|---|---|---|---|---|---|---|---|---|---|---|---|---|---|---|---|---|---|---|---|---|---|---|---|---|---|---|---|---|---|---|---|---|---|---|
| Ground | H | A | H | A | H | A | H | A | H | H | A | A | A | H | A | H | A | H | A | A | H | A | H | A | H | A | H | A | H | A | H | H | A | H | A | H | A | H |
| Result | D | L | L | D | L | W | D | L | D | D | L | W | L | L | D | L | L | L | W | L | W | D | W | L | D | L | W | D | W | D | D | L | D | L | L | W | L | W |
| Position | 10 | 16 | 20 | 19 | 20 | 19 | 18 | 18 | 19 | 19 | 18 | 17 | 17 | 19 | 19 | 19 | 20 | 20 | 20 | 20 | 18 | 19 | 15 | 16 | 18 | 19 | 17 | 17 | 16 | 16 | 16 | 17 | 18 | 18 | 18 | 18 | 18 | 18 |

A = Away; H = Home; W = Win; D = Draw; L = Loss; = Relegation to the Segunda División

==== Matches ====
Win Draw Loss

| Match | Date | Time | Opponent | Venue | Result |
|---|---|---|---|---|---|
| 1 | 27 August 2005 | 19:00 | Barcelona | H | 0–0 |
| 2 | 11 September 2005 | 18:00 | Real Sociedad | A | 1–2 |
| 3 | 18 September 2005 | 16:00 | Getafe | H | 3–4 |
| 4 | 21 September 2005 | 20:00 | Málaga | A | 0–0 |
| 5 | 25 September 2005 | 16:00 | Real Madrid | H | 0–3 |
| 6 | 2 October 2005 | 16:00 | Racing Santander | A | 2–1 |
| 7 | 15 October 2005 | 17:00 | Villarreal | H | 1–1 |
| 8 | 22 October 2005 | 19:00 | Sevilla | A | 0–2 |
| 9 | 27 October 2005 | 19:00 | Espanyol | H | 1–1 |
| 10 | 30 October 2005 | 16:00 | Cádiz | H | 0–0 |
| 11 | 6 November 2005 | 16:00 | Celta Vigo | A | 1–2 |
| 12 | 20 November 2005 | 16:00 | Athletic Bilbao | A | 2–0 |
| 13 | 27 November 2005 | 16:00 | Osasuna | A | 2–3 |
| 14 | 4 December 2005 | 16:00 | Mallorca | H | 0–3 |
| 15 | 11 December 2005 | 16:00 | Atlético Madrid | A | 1–1 |
| 16 | 18 December 2005 | 16:00 | Valencia | H | 0–1 |
| 17 | 21 December 2005 | 19:00 | Real Betis | A | 0–3 |
| 18 | 8 January 2006 | 16:00 | Real Zaragoza | H | 0–2 |
| 19 | 15 January 2006 | 16:00 | Deportivo La Coruña | A | 2–0 |
| 20 | 22 January 2006 | 18:00 | Barcelona | A | 0–2 |
| 21 | 29 January 2006 | 16:00 | Real Sociedad | H | 3–1 |
| 22 | 5 February 2006 | 16:00 | Getafe | A | 2–2 |
| 23 | 12 February 2006 | 16:00 | Málaga | H | 3–2 |
| 24 | 18 February 2006 | 19:00 | Real Madrid | A | 0–3 |
| 25 | 26 February 2006 | 16:00 | Racing Santander | H | 2–2 |
| 26 | 4 March 2006 | 17:00 | Villarreal | A | 2–3 |
| 27 | 12 March 2006 | 16:00 | Sevilla | H | 2–1 |
| 28 | 19 March 2006 | 16:00 | Cádiz | A | 0–0 |
| 29 | 22 March 2006 | 19:00 | Celta Vigo | H | 1–0 |
| 30 | 26 March 2006 | 16:00 | Espanyol | A | 0–0 |
| 31 | 2 April 2006 | 16:00 | Athletic Bilbao | H | 0–0 |
| 32 | 9 April 2006 | 16:00 | Osasuna | H | 1–2 |
| 33 | 15 April 2006 | 17:00 | Mallorca | A | 0–0 |
| 34 | 22 April 2006 | 19:00 | Atlético Madrid | H | 0–1 |
| 35 | 30 April 2006 | 16:00 | Valencia | A | 0–3 |
| 36 | 3 May 2006 | 19:00 | Real Betis | H | 2–0 |
| 37 | 7 May 2006 | 16:00 | Real Zaragoza | A | 0–3 |
| 38 | 13 May 2006 | 21:00 | Deportivo La Coruña | H | 1–0 |

=== Copa del Rey ===
Win Draw Loss

| Round | Date | Time | Opponent | Venue | Result |
|---|---|---|---|---|---|
| Third round | 19 October 2005 | 19:30 | Eibar | A | 0–1 |

== Statistics ==
=== Appearances and goals ===
Last updated on 30 March 2021.

| No. | Pos | Nat | Player | Total | | La Liga | | Copa del Rey | |
| No. | Pos | Nat | Player | Apps | Goals | Apps | Goals | Apps | Goals |
|---|---|---|---|---|---|---|---|---|---|
| 1 | GK | (Argentina) ARG | Franco Costanzo | 31 | 0 | 31 | 0 | 0 | 0 |
| 2 | DF | (Spain) ESP | David Coromina | 28 | 0 | 23+4 | 0 | 1 | 0 |
| 3 | DF | (Argentina) ARG | Mauricio Pellegrino | 14 | 0 | 11+2 | 0 | 1 | 0 |
| 4 | DF | (Spain) ESP | Juanito | 37 | 0 | 34+3 | 0 | 0 | 0 |
| 5 | DF | (Spain) ESP | Josu Sarriegi | 31 | 2 | 30 | 2 | 1 | 0 |
| 6 | DF | (Spain) ESP | Ibon Begoña | 4 | 0 | 3+1 | 0 | 0 | 0 |
| 6 | DF | (Spain) ESP | Óscar Téllez | 4 | 0 | 2+2 | 0 | 0 | 0 |
| 7 | DF | (Spain) ESP | Lluís Carreras | 4 | 0 | 4 | 0 | 0 | 0 |
| 8 | FW | (Uruguay) URU | Antonio Pacheco | 0 | 0 | 0 | 0 | 0 | 0 |
| 9 | FW | (Spain) ESP | Rubén Navarro | 16 | 0 | 10+5 | 0 | 1 | 0 |
| 10 | MF | (Spain) ESP | Quique de Lucas | 22 | 2 | 18+4 | 2 | 0 | 0 |
| 11 | FW | (Senegal) SEN | Pape Thiaw | 4 | 0 | 0+4 | 0 | 0 | 0 |
| 12 | DF | (Spain) ESP | Gaspar Gálvez | 21 | 0 | 19+2 | 0 | 0 | 0 |
| 13 | GK | (France) FRA | Nicolas Ardouin | 1 | 0 | 0 | 0 | 1 | 0 |
| 14 | MF | (Brazil) BRA | Élton Giovanni | 4 | 0 | 0+4 | 0 | 0 | 0 |
| 15 | MF | (Spain) ESP | Santiago Carpintero | 28 | 2 | 22+5 | 2 | 1 | 0 |
| 16 | DF | (Spain) ESP | Poli | 10 | 0 | 8+1 | 0 | 1 | 0 |
| 17 | MF | (Spain) ESP | Edu Alonso | 35 | 0 | 35 | 0 | 0 | 0 |
| 18 | MF | (Argentina) ARG | Martín Astudillo | 34 | 1 | 32+1 | 1 | 0+1 | 0 |
| 19 | FW | (Equatorial Guinea) EQG | Rodolfo Bodipo | 36 | 8 | 29+6 | 8 | 1 | 0 |
| 19 | FW | (Spain) ESP | Gabri | 0 | 0 | 0 | 0 | 0 | 0 |
| 20 | FW | (Spain) ESP | José María Mena | 11 | 0 | 3+7 | 0 | 1 | 0 |
| 21 | MF | (Spain) ESP | Jandro | 32 | 0 | 18+14 | 0 | 0 | 0 |
| 22 | FW | (Australia) AUS | John Aloisi | 34 | 10 | 25+8 | 10 | 1 | 0 |
| 23 | MF | (Brazil) BRA | Nenê | 38 | 9 | 38 | 9 | 0 | 0 |
| 24 | FW | (Brazil) BRA | Arthuro | 6 | 0 | 1+5 | 0 | 0 | 0 |
| 25 | GK | (Argentina) ARG | Roberto Bonano | 7 | 0 | 7 | 0 | 0 | 0 |
| 26 | MF | (France) FRA | Mehdi Lacen | 20 | 0 | 9+10 | 0 | 1 | 0 |
| 28 | MF | (Bulgaria) BUL | Blagoy Georgiev | 10 | 0 | 3+7 | 0 | 0 | 0 |
Players who have left the club after the start of the season:
| | MF | (Brazil) BRA | Wesley | 11 | 1 | 3+7 | 1 | 0+1 | 0 |
| | FW | (Gabon) GAB | Henri Antchouet | 4 | 0 | 0+3 | 0 | 0+1 | 0 |

=== Goal scorers ===
| Place | Position | Nation | Number | Name | La Liga | Copa del Rey | Total |
|---|---|---|---|---|---|---|---|
| 1 | FW | (Australia) | 22 | John Aloisi | 10 | 0 | 10 |
| 2 | MF | (Brazil) | 23 | Nenê | 9 | 0 | 9 |
| 3 | FW | (Equatorial Guinea) | 19 | Rodolfo Bodipo | 8 | 0 | 8 |
| 4 | DF | (Spain) | 5 | Josu Sarriegi | 2 | 0 | 2 |
| 4 | MF | (Spain) | 10 | Quique de Lucas | 2 | 0 | 2 |
| 4 | MF | (Spain) | 15 | Santiago Carpintero | 2 | 0 | 2 |
| 7 | MF | (Argentina) | 18 | Martín Astudillo | 1 | 0 | 1 |
| 7 | MF | (Brazil) | | Wesley | 1 | 0 | 1 |
| | | | | TOTALS | 35 | 0 | 35 |
