= 1999–2000 Coventry City F.C. season =

Coventry City F.C.
1999–2000 season
- Chairman: Bryan Richardson
- Manager: Gordon Strachan
- Stadium: Highfield Road
- Premier League: 14th
- FA Cup: Fourth round
- League Cup: Fourth round
- Top goalscorer: League: Robbie Keane (12); All: Gary McAllister (13)
- Highest home attendance: 23,098 (vs. Liverpool, 1 April)
- Lowest home attendance: 17,685 (vs. Derby County, 21 August)
- Average home league attendance: 20,786
| Home colours | Away colours |

During the 1999–2000 English football season, Coventry City competed in the FA Premier League.

== Season summary ==
Coventry City were one of the FA Premier League's best-performing sides at home during 1999–2000, achieving 12 victories at the Highfield Road stadium. However, they failed to win a single away game all season, ruining their hopes of getting anywhere near the top five, and they were restricted to 14th place in the final table. 1999–2000 also marked the end of 43-year-old goalkeeper Steve Ogrizovic's illustrious career at the club, and severed their final remaining link with the 1987 FA Cup winning side. Robbie Keane proved a successful signing with 12 goals in 34 league appearances.

== Final league table ==
| Pos | Team | Pld | W | D | L | GF | GA | GD | Pts |
|---|---|---|---|---|---|---|---|---|---|
| 12 | Middlesbrough | 38 | 14 | 10 | 14 | 46 | 52 | −6 | 52 |
| 13 | Everton | 38 | 12 | 14 | 12 | 59 | 49 | +10 | 50 |
| 14 | Coventry City | 38 | 12 | 8 | 18 | 47 | 54 | −7 | 44 |
| 15 | Southampton | 38 | 12 | 8 | 18 | 45 | 62 | −17 | 44 |
| 16 | Derby County | 38 | 9 | 11 | 18 | 44 | 57 | −13 | 38 |

Source: Premier League
Rules for classification: 1) points; 2) goal difference; 3) number of goals scored.

Results summary

| Overall | | | | | | | | Home | | | | | | Away | | | | | |
| Pld | W | D | L | GF | GA | GD | Pts | W | D | L | GF | GA | GD | W | D | L | GF | GA | GD |
|---|---|---|---|---|---|---|---|---|---|---|---|---|---|---|---|---|---|---|---|
| 38 | 12 | 8 | 18 | 47 | 54 | −7 | 44 | 12 | 1 | 6 | 38 | 22 | +16 | 0 | 7 | 12 | 9 | 32 | −23 |

Source: 1999–2000 FA Premier League table

Results by round

| Round | 1 | 2 | 3 | 4 | 5 | 6 | 7 | 8 | 9 | 10 | 11 | 12 | 13 | 14 | 15 | 16 | 17 | 18 | 19 | 20 | 21 | 22 | 23 | 24 | 25 | 26 | 27 | 28 | 29 | 30 | 31 | 32 | 33 | 34 | 35 | 36 | 37 | 38 |
|---|---|---|---|---|---|---|---|---|---|---|---|---|---|---|---|---|---|---|---|---|---|---|---|---|---|---|---|---|---|---|---|---|---|---|---|---|---|---|
| Ground | H | A | A | H | H | A | H | A | H | A | H | A | H | A | H | H | A | A | H | H | H | A | A | H | A | H | A | A | H | H | A | H | A | H | A | A | H | A |
| Result | L | L | D | W | L | D | L | L | W | D | W | D | W | D | W | L | D | L | W | D | W | D | L | W | L | L | L | L | W | W | L | L | L | W | L | L | W | L |
| Position | 16 | 17 | 16 | 12 | 16 | 16 | 17 | 17 | 15 | 14 | 12 | 13 | 13 | 12 | 11 | 12 | 11 | 13 | 13 | 13 | 12 | 12 | 12 | 12 | 12 | 13 | 14 | 14 | 14 | 11 | 14 | 14 | 14 | 14 | 14 | 14 | 14 | 14 |

Source: 11v11.com: 1999–2000 Coventry City results
A = Away; H = Home; W = Win; D = Draw; L = Loss

== Results ==
Coventry City's score comes first

=== Legend ===
| Win | Draw | Loss |

=== FA Premier League ===
| Date | Opponent | Venue | Result | Attendance | Scorers |
|---|---|---|---|---|---|
| 7 August 1999 | Southampton | H | 0–1 | 19,915 | |
| 11 August 1999 | Leicester City | A | 0–1 | 19,196 | |
| 14 August 1999 | Wimbledon | A | 1–1 | 10,635 | McAllister (pen) |
| 21 August 1999 | Derby County | H | 2–0 | 17,685 | Keane (2) |
| 25 August 1999 | Manchester United | H | 1–2 | 22,024 | Aloisi |
| 29 August 1999 | Sunderland | A | 1–1 | 39,427 | Keane |
| 11 September 1999 | Leeds United | H | 3–4 | 21,532 | McAllister (pen), Aloisi, Chippo |
| 19 September 1999 | Tottenham Hotspur | A | 2–3 | 35,224 | Keane, Chippo |
| 25 September 1999 | West Ham United | H | 1–0 | 19,993 | Hadji |
| 2 October 1999 | Everton | A | 1–1 | 34,839 | McAllister |
| 16 October 1999 | Newcastle United | H | 4–1 | 23,031 | Palmer, Williams, Keane, Hadji |
| 23 October 1999 | Sheffield Wednesday | A | 0–0 | 23,296 | |
| 31 October 1999 | Watford | H | 4–0 | 21,700 | Keane, Froggatt, Hadji, McAllister (pen) |
| 6 November 1999 | Bradford City | A | 1–1 | 17,587 | McAllister |
| 22 November 1999 | Aston Villa | H | 2–1 | 20,184 | Roussel, Keane |
| 27 November 1999 | Leicester City | H | 0–1 | 22,021 | |
| 4 December 1999 | Southampton | A | 0–0 | 15,168 | |
| 18 December 1999 | Liverpool | A | 0–2 | 44,024 | |
| 26 December 1999 | Arsenal | H | 3–2 | 22,757 | McAllister, Hadji, Keane |
| 4 January 2000 | Chelsea | H | 2–2 | 20,164 | Roussel, Keane |
| 15 January 2000 | Wimbledon | H | 2–0 | 19,012 | McAllister (pen), Keane |
| 22 January 2000 | Derby County | A | 0–0 | 28,381 | |
| 5 February 2000 | Manchester United | A | 2–3 | 61,380 | Roussel (2) |
| 12 February 2000 | Sunderland | H | 3–2 | 22,101 | Keane, Hadji, Roussel |
| 19 February 2000 | Middlesbrough | A | 0–2 | 32,798 | |
| 26 February 2000 | Tottenham Hotspur | H | 0–1 | 23,077 | |
| 5 March 2000 | Leeds United | A | 0–3 | 38,710 | |
| 11 March 2000 | Aston Villa | A | 0–1 | 33,177 | |
| 15 March 2000 | Everton | H | 1–0 | 18,518 | McAllister |
| 18 March 2000 | Bradford City | H | 4–0 | 19,201 | Roussel, Whelan, Eustace, Zúñiga |
| 26 March 2000 | Arsenal | A | 0–3 | 38,027 | |
| 1 April 2000 | Liverpool | H | 0–3 | 23,098 | |
| 12 April 2000 | Chelsea | A | 1–2 | 32,316 | McAllister |
| 15 April 2000 | Middlesbrough | H | 2–1 | 19,435 | Ince (own goal), Keane |
| 22 April 2000 | West Ham United | A | 0–5 | 24,719 | |
| 29 April 2000 | Newcastle United | A | 0–2 | 36,408 | |
| 6 May 2000 | Sheffield Wednesday | H | 4–1 | 19,921 | McAllister (2), Zúñiga, Hadji |
| 14 May 2000 | Watford | A | 0–1 | 18,977 | |

=== FA Cup ===
| Round | Date | Opponent | Venue | Result | Attendance | Goalscorers |
|---|---|---|---|---|---|---|
| R3 | 11 December 1999 | Norwich City | A | 3–1 | 15,702 | Whelan, Roussel, Eustace |
| R4 | 8 January 2000 | Burnley | H | 3–0 | 22,774 | Chippo (2), Whelan |
| R5 | 29 January 2000 | Charlton Athletic | H | 2–3 | 23,400 | Roussel (2) |

=== League Cup ===
| Round | Date | Opponent | Venue | Result | Attendance | Goalscorers |
|---|---|---|---|---|---|---|
| R2 1st Leg | 14 September 1999 | Tranmere Rovers | A | 1–5 | 6,759 | McAllister |
| R2 2nd Leg | 22 September 1999 | Tranmere Rovers | H | 3–1 (lost 4–6 on agg) | 12,433 | McAllister, Chippo (2) |

== First-team squad ==
Squad at end of season

Note: Flags indicate national team as defined under FIFA eligibility rules; some limited exceptions apply. Players may hold more than one non-FIFA nationality.

| No. | Pos. | Nation | Player |
|---|---|---|---|
| 1 | GK | SWE | Magnus Hedman |
| 2 | DF | ENG | Marc Edworthy |
| 3 | DF | ENG | David Burrows |
| 4 | DF | ENG | Paul Williams |
| 5 | DF | ENG | Richard Shaw |
| 6 | DF | BIH | Muhamed Konjić |
| 7 | FW | IRL | Robbie Keane |
| 8 | FW | ENG | Noel Whelan |
| 9 | FW | AUS | John Aloisi |
| 10 | MF | SCO | Gary McAllister |
| 11 | MF | MAR | Mustapha Hadji |
| 12 | DF | SCO | Paul Telfer |
| 14 | MF | ENG | Carlton Palmer |
| 15 | MF | BEL | Laurent Delorge |
| 16 | MF | ENG | Steve Froggatt |

| No. | Pos. | Nation | Player |
|---|---|---|---|
| 17 | DF | IRL | Gary Breen |
| 18 | MF | MAR | Youssef Chippo |
| 19 | DF | ENG | Marcus Hall |
| 20 | MF | NOR | Runar Normann |
| 21 | MF | SCO | Gavin Strachan |
| 22 | DF | IRL | Barry Quinn |
| 24 | MF | ENG | John Eustace |
| 26 | GK | ENG | Steve Ogrizovic |
| 28 | FW | ENG | Gary McSheffrey |
| 31 | FW | BEL | Cedric Roussel |
| 32 | DF | SWE | Tomas Gustafsson |
| 33 | GK | ENG | Chris Kirkland |
| 34 | FW | PER | Ysrael Zúñiga |
| 35 | DF | SCO | Colin Hendry |
| 38 | MF | ENG | Robert Betts |

=== Left club during season ===
Note: Flags indicate national team as defined under FIFA eligibility rules; some limited exceptions apply. Players may hold more than one non-FIFA nationality.

| No. | Pos. | Nation | Player |
|---|---|---|---|
| 7 | FW | ENG | Darren Huckerby (to Leeds United) |
| 14 | MF | NOR | Trond Egil Soltvedt (to Southampton) |

| No. | Pos. | Nation | Player |
|---|---|---|---|
| 23 | GK | ITA | Raffaele Nuzzo (to A.C. Reggiana 1919) |
| 29 | MF | JAM | Paul Hall (to Walsall) |

=== Reserve squad ===
The following players did not appear for the first-team this season.

Note: Flags indicate national team as defined under FIFA eligibility rules; some limited exceptions apply. Players may hold more than one non-FIFA nationality.

| No. | Pos. | Nation | Player |
|---|---|---|---|
| 13 | GK | DEN | Morten Hyldgaard |
| 25 | MF | IRL | Barry Ferguson |
| 27 | FW | SCO | Stephen McPhee |
| 29 | DF | SWE | Richard Spong |
| 30 | FW | SCO | Gary McPhee |
| 36 | DF | ENG | Craig Pead |
| 37 | MF | WAL | Lee Fowler |
| 39 | FW | ENG | Chukki Eribenne |
| 40 | DF | SCO | Gerard Mooney |
| 41 | DF | ENG | Mark Burrows |

| No. | Pos. | Nation | Player |
|---|---|---|---|
| 42 | DF | ENG | Thomas Cudworth |
| 43 | GK | ENG | Adam Mehmet |
| 44 | MF | ENG | Craig Strachan |
| — | DF | ENG | Ian Brightwell |
| — | MF | ENG | Chris Barnett |
| — | FW | ITA | Stefano Gioacchini |
| — | DF | ENG | Daniel Jones |
| — | DF | ENG | Aaron Shanahan |
| — | MF | SCO | David Castro-Pearson |
| — | MF | SCO | Martin Grant |
| — | MF | IRL | Daire Doyle |

== Transfers ==
=== In ===
| Date | Pos. | Name | From | Fee |
|---|---|---|---|---|
| 22 June 1999 | GK | Raffaele Nuzzo | Inter | Free |
| 19 July 1999 | MF | Mustapha Hadji | Deportivo | £4,000,000 |
| 26 July 1999 | FW | Stefano Gioacchini | Venezia | £2,000,000 |
| 31 July 1999 | MF | Runar Normann | Lillestrøm | £1,000,000 |
| 18 August 1999 | FW | Robbie Keane | Wolverhampton Wanderers | £6,000,000 |
| 17 September 1999 | MF | Carlton Palmer | Nottingham Forest | £500,000 |
| 8 December 1999 | DF | Tomas Gustafsson | AIK | £250,000 |
| 16 December 1999 | DF | Richard Spong | IF Brommapojkarna | £80,000 |
| 20 January 2000 | FW | Cedric Roussel | AA Gent | £1,200,000 |
| 21 January 2000 | FW | Ysrael Zúñiga | FBC Melgar | £750,000 |
| 24 February 2000 | DF | Colin Hendry | Rangers | £750,000 |

=== Out ===
| Date | Pos. | Name | To | Fee |
|---|---|---|---|---|
| 2 June 1999 | DF | Barry Prenderville | Ayr United | Free |
| 23 June 1999 | MF | Willie Boland | Cardiff City | Free |
| 29 June 1999 | DF | Philippe Clement | Club Brugge | £800,000 |
| 1 July 1999 | GK | Tynan Scope | Bristol City | Free |
| 1 July 1999 | MF | Martin Devaney | Cheltenham Town | Free |
| 20 July 1999 | MF | George Boateng | Aston Villa | £4,500,000 |
| 1 August 1999 | DF | Rob Miller | Cambridge United | Free |
| 11 August 1999 | FW | Darren Huckerby | Leeds United | £4,000,000 |
| 12 August 1999 | MF | Trond Egil Soltvedt | Southampton | £300,000 |
| 16 September 1999 | MF | Sam Shilton | Hartlepool United | Free |
| 17 November 1999 | GK | Raffaele Nuzzo | Reggina | Free |
| 23 March 2000 | MF | Paul Hall | Walsall | Free |

Transfers in: ▼£15,450,000
Transfers out: ▲£9,600,000
Total spending: ▼£5,850,000

== Statistics ==
=== Appearances and goals ===
| No. | Pos | Nat | Player | Total | | FA Premier League | | FA Cup | | League Cup | |
| No. | Pos | Nat | Player | Apps | Goals | Apps | Goals | Apps | Goals | Apps | Goals |
Goalkeepers
| 1 | GK | (Sweden) SWE | Magnus Hedman | 38 | 0 | 35 | 0 | 3 | 0 | 0 | 0 |
| 26 | GK | (England) ENG | Steve Ogrizovic | 3 | 0 | 3 | 0 | 0 | 0 | 0 | 0 |
| 33 | GK | (England) ENG | Chris Kirkland | 1 | 0 | 0 | 0 | 0 | 0 | 1 | 0 |
Defenders
| 2 | DF | (England) ENG | Marc Edworthy | 12 | 0 | 10 | 0 | 0 | 0 | 2 | 0 |
| 3 | DF | (England) ENG | David Burrows | 16 | 0 | 11+4 | 0 | 0 | 0 | 1 | 0 |
| 4 | DF | (England) ENG | Paul Williams | 32 | 1 | 26+2 | 1 | 3 | 0 | 1 | 0 |
| 5 | DF | (England) ENG | Richard Shaw | 32 | 1 | 27+2 | 1 | 0+1 | 0 | 2 | 0 |
| 6 | DF | (Bosnia and Herzegovina) BIH | Muhamed Konjić | 6 | 0 | 3+1 | 0 | 0 | 0 | 1+1 | 0 |
| 12 | DF | (Scotland) SCO | Paul Telfer | 34 | 0 | 26+4 | 0 | 3 | 0 | 1 | 0 |
| 17 | DF | (Republic of Ireland) IRL | Gary Breen | 25 | 0 | 20+1 | 0 | 3 | 0 | 1 | 0 |
| 19 | DF | (England) ENG | Marcus Hall | 11 | 0 | 7+2 | 0 | 0 | 0 | 1+1 | 0 |
| 22 | DF | (Republic of Ireland) IRL | Barry Quinn | 11 | 0 | 5+6 | 0 | 0 | 0 | 0 | 0 |
| 23 | DF | (Peru) PER | Walter Zevallos | 0 | 0 | 0 | 0 | 0 | 0 | 0 | 0 |
| 32 | DF | (Sweden) SWE | Tomas Gustafsson | 12 | 0 | 7+3 | 0 | 0+2 | 0 | 0 | 0 |
| 35 | DF | (Scotland) SCO | Colin Hendry | 9 | 0 | 9 | 0 | 0 | 0 | 0 | 0 |
Midfielders
| 10 | MF | (Scotland) SCO | Gary McAllister | 43 | 13 | 38 | 11 | 3 | 0 | 2 | 2 |
| 11 | MF | (Morocco) MAR | Mustapha Hadji | 36 | 6 | 33 | 6 | 2 | 0 | 1 | 0 |
| 14 | MF | (England) ENG | Carlton Palmer | 19 | 1 | 15 | 1 | 3 | 0 | 1 | 0 |
| 15 | MF | (Belgium) BEL | Laurent Delorge | 1 | 0 | 0 | 0 | 0+1 | 0 | 0 | 0 |
| 16 | MF | (England) ENG | Steve Froggatt | 30 | 1 | 21+5 | 1 | 3 | 0 | 1 | 0 |
| 18 | MF | (Morocco) MAR | Youssef Chippo | 36 | 6 | 33 | 2 | 2 | 2 | 1 | 2 |
| 20 | MF | (Norway) NOR | Runar Normann | 9 | 0 | 1+7 | 0 | 1 | 0 | 0 | 0 |
| 21 | MF | (Scotland) SCO | Gavin Strachan | 4 | 0 | 1+2 | 0 | 0 | 0 | 1 | 0 |
| 24 | MF | (England) ENG | John Eustace | 21 | 2 | 12+4 | 1 | 1+2 | 1 | 1+1 | 0 |
| 38 | MF | (England) ENG | Robert Betts | 2 | 0 | 0+2 | 0 | 0 | 0 | 0 | 0 |
Forwards
| 7 | FW | (Republic of Ireland) IRL | Robbie Keane | 34 | 12 | 30+1 | 12 | 3 | 0 | 0 | 0 |
| 8 | FW | (England) ENG | Noel Whelan | 28 | 3 | 20+6 | 1 | 1+1 | 2 | 0 | 0 |
| 9 | FW | (Australia) AUS | John Aloisi | 7 | 2 | 3+4 | 2 | 0 | 0 | 0 | 0 |
| 28 | FW | (England) ENG | Gary McSheffrey | 5 | 0 | 0+3 | 0 | 0 | 0 | 2 | 0 |
| 31 | FW | (Belgium) BEL | Cédric Roussel | 25 | 9 | 18+4 | 6 | 0 | 0 | 2+1 | 3 |
| 34 | FW | (Peru) PER | Ysrael Zúñiga | 7 | 2 | 3+4 | 2 | 0 | 0 | 0 | 0 |
Players transferred or loaned out during the season
| 7 | FW | (England) ENG | Darren Huckerby | 1 | 0 | 1 | 0 | 0 | 0 | 0 | 0 |
| 23 | GK | (Italy) ITA | Raffaele Nuzzo | 1 | 0 | 0 | 0 | 0 | 0 | 1 | 0 |
| 29 | FW | (Jamaica) JAM | Paul Hall | 1 | 0 | 0+1 | 0 | 0 | 0 | 0 | 0 |

Last updated: 31 June 2002
Source: Competitions
