= 2000–01 Coventry City F.C. season =

Coventry City F.C.
2000–01 season
- Chairman: Bryan Richardson
- Manager: Gordon Strachan
- Stadium: Highfield Road
- FA Premier League: 19th (relegated)
- FA Cup: Fourth round
- League Cup: Fourth round
- Top goalscorer: League: Craig Bellamy/John Hartson/Moustapha Hadji (6); All: Craig Bellamy (8)
- Highest home attendance: 23,063 vs Liverpool (28 April 2001, FA Premier League)
- Lowest home attendance: 7,425 vs Preston North End (27 September 2000, League Cup)
- Average home league attendance: 20,535
Home colours	Away colours

During the 2000–01 English football season, Coventry City F.C. competed in the FA Premier League. It was their 34th consecutive season in the top division, but this season saw the club relegated. They would not return to the Premier League for another 25 years until the 2026–27 Coventry City F.C. season.

== Season summary ==
Coventry City's season started promisingly. Despite an opening-day 3–1 home defeat to Middlesbrough, this was followed by back-to-back away victories at Southampton and Manchester City, which was the first time they had won an away league game since April 1999 and the first time they had won back-to-back away league games since February 1998. However, this burst of form instantly evaporated and by December 2000, Coventry had dropped into the relegation zone after obtaining only one more win (a 2–1 home win over Tottenham Hotspur) and 6 points from 13 matches. With the exception of three rounds, all of which were before January 2001, Coventry would ultimately stay there for the rest of the season. After 34 years in the top flight and 10 close shaves with relegation, their luck finally ran out and they were relegated to the First Division after a 3–2 away defeat at Aston Villa on 5 May 2001. It was the first time they had suffered relegation since 1958, when they were relegated to Division Four - then the fourth tier of English football. Much optimism followed Coventry's relegation with everyone at the club working hard to attain promotion at the first attempt. These hopes were boosted with the signing of prolific striker Lee Hughes from local rivals West Bromwich Albion.

In the FA Cup, Coventry won 2–0 away at Swindon Town in the third round, but were eliminated by Manchester City after a 1–0 defeat at Maine Road. Their League Cup campaign began with the club convincingly beating Preston North End 7–2 on aggregate in the second round (in which they won both legs), before defeating Southampton away for the second time in the season. However, this cup run came to an end after a 2–1 defeat by Ipswich Town at Portman Road.

== Final league table ==
Pos	Team	Pld	W	D	L	GF	GA	GD	Pts	Qualification or relegation
16	Everton	38	11	9	18	45	59	−14	42	
17	Derby County	38	10	12	16	37	59	−22	42	
18	Manchester City (R)	38	8	10	20	41	65	−24	34	Relegation to the Football League First Division
19	Coventry City (R)	38	8	10	20	36	63	−27	34	Relegation to the Football League First Division
20	Bradford City (R)	38	5	11	22	30	70	−40	26	Relegation to the Football League First Division

Source: Premier League
Rules for classification: 1) points; 2) goal difference; 3) number of goals scored.
(R) Relegated

Results summary

Overall								Home						Away					
Pld	W	D	L	GF	GA	GD	Pts	W	D	L	GF	GA	GD	W	D	L	GF	GA	GD
38	8	10	20	36	63	−27	34	4	7	8	14	23	−9	4	3	12	22	40	−18

Source: 2000-01 FA Premier League table

Results by round

Round	1	2	3	4	5	6	7	8	9	10	11	12	13	14	15	16	17	18	19	20	21	22	23	24	25	26	27	28	29	30	31	32	33	34	35	36	37	38
Ground	H	A	A	H	H	A	H	A	H	A	A	H	A	H	H	A	H	A	H	A	A	H	A	H	A	H	A	H	H	A	H	A	A	H	A	H	A	H
Result	L	W	W	L	D	L	L	D	W	L	L	L	L	L	D	L	W	L	D	W	D	D	L	L	L	L	D	D	D	L	W	W	L	W	L	L	L	D
Position	17	11	4	9	9	12	17	16	13	15	16	17	17	17	17	18	17	18	18	18	17	17	18	19	19	19	19	19	19	19	19	18	19	18	18	19	19	19

Source: 11v11.com: 2000–01 Coventry City results
A = Away; H = Home; W = Win; D = Draw; L = Loss

== Results ==
Coventry City's score comes first

=== Legend ===
Win	Draw	Loss

=== FA Premier League ===
19 August 2000 1	Coventry City	1–3	Middlesbrough	Coventry
	Eustace 40'	(Report)	Job 19'; Bokšić 58', 63'	Stadium: Highfield Road; Attendance: 20,624; Referee: Barry Knight

23 August 2000 2	Southampton	1–2	Coventry City	Southampton
	Tessem 52'	(Report)	Bellamy 19' (pen.); Roussel 61'	Stadium: The Dell; Attendance: 14,801; Referee: Paul Taylor

26 August 2000 3	Manchester City	1–2	Coventry City	Manchester
	Horlock 78'	(Report)	Edghill 23' (o.g.); Bellamy 45'	Stadium: Maine Road; Attendance: 34,140; Referee: Andy D'Urso

6 September 2000 4	Coventry City	0–2	Newcastle United	Coventry
		(Report)	Shearer 30' (pen.); Gallacher 58'	Stadium: Highfield Road; Attendance: 22,109; Referee: Alan Wiley

9 September 2000 5	Coventry City	0–0	Leeds United	Coventry
		(Report)		Stadium: Highfield Road; Attendance: 20,377; Referee: Paul Durkin

16 September 2000 6	Arsenal	2–1	Coventry City	London (Highbury)
	Wiltord 24'; Vernazza 72'	(Report)	Hadji 80'	Stadium: Arsenal Stadium; Attendance: 37,792; Referee: Mike Dean

23 September 2000 7	Coventry City	0–3	West Ham United	Coventry
		(Report)	Di Canio 38'; Cole 40'; Lampard 69'	Stadium: Highfield Road; Attendance: 21,020; Referee: Neale Barry

30 September 2000 8	Charlton Athletic	2–2	Coventry City	London (Charlton)
	Hunt 60'; Johansson 88'	(Report)	Aloisi 41'; Bellamy 71' (pen.)	Stadium: The Valley; Attendance: 20,043; Referee: Rob Styles

14 October 2000 9	Coventry City	2–1	Tottenham Hotspur	Coventry
	Aloisi 12'; Eustace 26'		Rebrov 53'	Stadium: Highfield Road; Attendance: 21,435; Referee: Peter Jones

21 October 2000 10	Chelsea	6–1	Coventry City	London (Fulham)
	Hasselbaink 25' (pen.), 42', 52', 58'; Zola 48'; Flo 68'	(Report)	Roussel 89'	Stadium: Stamford Bridge; Attendance: 34,646; Referee: Stephen Lodge

28 October 2000 11	Sunderland	1–0	Coventry City	Sunderland
	Thome 52'	(Report)		Stadium: Stadium of Light; Attendance: 44,526; Referee: Alan Wiley

4 November 2000 12	Coventry City	1–2	Manchester United	Coventry
	Zúñiga 64'	(Report)	Cole 27'; Beckham 37'	Stadium: Highfield Road; Attendance: 21,079; Referee: Graham Poll

12 November 2000 13	Liverpool	4–1	Coventry City	Liverpool
	McAllister 13'; Gerrard 51'; Heskey 82', 87'	(Report)	Thompson 56'	Stadium: Anfield; Attendance: 43,701; Referee: Mike Riley

20 November 2000 14	Coventry City	0–1	Ipswich Town	Coventry
		(Report)	Wilnis 90'	Stadium: Highfield Road; Attendance: 19,324; Referee: David Elleray

25 November 2000 15	Coventry City	1–1	Aston Villa	Coventry
	Hadji 83'		Dublin 8'	Stadium: Highfield Road; Attendance: 21,464; Referee: Jeff Winter

2 December 2000 16	Bradford City	2–1	Coventry City	Bradford
	Collymore 80'; Beagrie 83'	(Report)	Aloisi 64'	Stadium: Valley Parade; Attendance: 15,523; Referee: Mike Dean

10 December 2000 17	Coventry City	1–0	Leicester City	Coventry
	Bellamy 40'			Stadium: Highfield Road; Attendance: 17,283; Referee: Steve Dunn

16 December 2000 18	Derby County	1–0	Coventry City	Derby
	Christie 9'	(Report)		Stadium: Pride Park Stadium; Attendance: 27,869; Referee: Matt Messias

22 December 2000 19	Coventry City	1–1	Southampton	Coventry
	Thompson 33'	(Report)	Tessem 51'	Stadium: Highfield Road; Attendance: 18,090; Referee: Alan Wiley

26 December 2000 20	Everton	1–2	Coventry City	Liverpool
	Gemmill 85'	(Report)	Hadji 69'; Breen 87'	Stadium: Goodison Park; Attendance: 35,704; Referee: Neale Barry

30 December 2000 21	Middlesbrough	1–1	Coventry City	Middlesbrough
	Bokšić 86'	(Report)	Whelan 41' (o.g.)	Stadium: Riverside Stadium; Attendance: 30,499; Referee: Dermot Gallagher

1 January 2001 22	Coventry City	1–1	Manchester City	Coventry
	Edworthy 72'	(Report)	Wanchope 54'	Stadium: Highfield Road; Attendance: 21,999; Referee: Barry Knight

13 January 2001 23	Newcastle United	3–1	Coventry City	Newcastle upon Tyne
	Speed 4'; Ameobi 55'; Dyer 66'	(Report)	Thompson 78'	Stadium: St James' Park; Attendance: 50,159; Referee: Jeff Winter

20 January 2001 24	Coventry City	1–3	Everton	Coventry
	Carsley 86' (pen.)	(Report)	Gemmill 8'; Cadamarteri 15'; Campbell 31'	Stadium: Highfield Road; Attendance: 19,174; Referee: Paul Durkin

31 January 2001 25	Leeds United	1–0	Coventry City	Leeds
	Keane 69'	(Report)		Stadium: Elland Road; Attendance: 36,555; Referee: Rob Harris

3 February 2001 26	Coventry City	0–1	Arsenal	Coventry
		(Report)	Bergkamp 78'	Stadium: Highfield Road; Attendance: 22,035; Referee: Mike Dean

12 February 2001 27	West Ham United	1–1	Coventry City	London (Upton Park)
	Cole 83'	(Report)	Dailly 90' (o.g.)	Stadium: Boleyn Ground; Attendance: 22,586; Referee: Dermot Gallagher

24 February 2001 28	Coventry City	2–2	Charlton Athletic	Coventry
	Bellamy 10'; Hartson 67'	(Report)	Rufus 22'; Johansson 46'	Stadium: Highfield Road; Attendance: 19,480; Referee: Mark Halsey

3 March 2001 29	Coventry City	0–0	Chelsea	Coventry
		(Report)		Stadium: Highfield Road; Attendance: 21,609; Referee: Steve Bennett

17 March 2001 30	Tottenham Hotspur	3–0	Coventry City	London (Tottenham)
	Iversen 29'; Ferdinand 34'; Rebrov 59'	(Report)		Stadium: White Hart Lane; Attendance: 35,606; Referee: Graham Poll

31 March 2001 31	Coventry City	2–0	Derby County	Coventry
	Hadji 44'; Hartson 49'	(Report)		Stadium: Highfield Road; Attendance: 19,654; Referee: David Elleray

7 April 2001 32	Leicester City	1–3	Coventry City	Leicester
	Akinbiyi 10'	(Report)	Bellamy 2'; Carsley 19'; Hartson 51'	Stadium: Filbert Street; Attendance: 19,545; Referee: Graham Barber

14 April 2001 33	Manchester United	4–2	Coventry City	Manchester
	Yorke 12', 27'; Giggs 81'; Scholes 87'	(Report)	Hartson 10', 33'	Stadium: Old Trafford; Attendance: 67,637; Referee: Mike Riley

16 April 2001 34	Coventry City	1–0	Sunderland	Coventry
	Hartson 21'	(Report)		Stadium: Highfield Road; Attendance: 20,946; Referee: Dermot Gallagher

21 April 2001 35	Ipswich Town	2–0	Coventry City	Ipswich
	Reuser 20'; Wright 56'	(Report)		Stadium: Portman Road; Attendance: 24,612; Referee: Graham Barber

28 April 2001 36	Coventry City	0–2	Liverpool	Coventry
		(Report)	Hyypiä 83'; McAllister 86'	Stadium: Highfield Road; Attendance: 23,063; Referee: Steve Bennett

5 May 2001 37	Aston Villa	3–2	Coventry City	Birmingham
	Vassell 61'; Ángel 81'; Merson 86'	(Report)	Hadji 18', 26'	Stadium: Villa Park; Attendance: 39,761; Referee: Mike Riley

19 May 2001 38	Coventry City	0–0	Bradford City	Coventry
		(Report)		Stadium: Highfield Road; Attendance: 20,229; Referee: Alan Wiley

=== FA Cup ===
Round	Date	Opponent	Venue	Result	Attendance	Goalscorers
R3	6 January 2001	Swindon Town	A	2–0	14,445	Bellamy, Hadji
R4	27 January 2001	Manchester City	A	0–1	24,637	

=== League Cup ===
Round	Date	Opponent	Venue	Result	Attendance	Goalscorers
R2 1st Leg	19 September 2000	Preston North End	A	3–1	10,770	Zúñiga, Hall, Strachan (pen)
R2 2nd Leg	27 September 2000	Preston North End	H	4–1 (won 7–2 on agg)	7,425	Aloisi (3, 1 pen), Eustace
R3	1 November 2000	Southampton	A	1–0	11,809	Eustace
R4	28 November 2000	Ipswich Town	A	1–2	19,563	Bellamy (pen)

== Players ==
=== First-team squad ===
Squad at end of season

Note: Flags indicate national team as defined under FIFA eligibility rules; some limited exceptions apply. Players may hold more than one non-FIFA nationality.

No.	Pos.	Nation	Player
1	GK	SWE	Magnus Hedman
2	DF	ENG	Marc Edworthy
3	MF	ENG	Steve Froggatt
4	DF	ENG	Paul Williams
5	FW	WAL	John Hartson
6	DF	ENG	Richard Shaw
7	MF	ENG	David Thompson
8	MF	MAR	Youssef Chippo
10	MF	MAR	Mustapha Hadji (captain)
11	FW	PER	Ysrael Zúñiga
12	DF	SCO	Paul Telfer
13	GK	ENG	Chris Kirkland
14	MF	ENG	Carlton Palmer
15	MF	ENG	John Eustace
16	FW	AUS	John Aloisi

No.	Pos.	Nation	Player
17	DF	IRL	Gary Breen (Note: Breen was born in Barnet, England, but also qualified to represent the Republic of Ireland internationally and made his international debut for the Republic of Ireland in May 1996.)
18	FW	WAL	Craig Bellamy
19	MF	HON	Iván Guerrero
21	MF	SCO	Gavin Strachan
22	DF	IRL	Barry Quinn
24	DF	ENG	Marcus Hall
25	MF	IRL	Barry Ferguson
26	DF	BIH	Muhamed Konjić
27	FW	SCO	Stephen McPhee
28	FW	ENG	Jay Bothroyd
32	MF	IRL	Lee Carsley (Note: Carsley was born in Birmingham, England, but qualified to represent the Republic of Ireland internationally through his grandmother and represented the Republic of Ireland at U-21 and B level before making his international debut for Ireland in October 1997.)
34	GK	ENG	Alan Miller (on loan from Blackburn Rovers)
41	DF	ENG	Calum Davenport
42	MF	ENG	Robert Betts

=== Left club during season ===
Note: Flags indicate national team as defined under FIFA eligibility rules; some limited exceptions apply. Players may hold more than one non-FIFA nationality.

No.	Pos.	Nation	Player
5	DF	SCO	Colin Hendry (to Bolton Wanderers)
9	FW	BEL	Cédric Roussel (to Wolverhampton Wanderers)

No.	Pos.	Nation	Player
32	MF	IRL	Daire Doyle (to Kidderminster Harriers)
42	MF	ENG	Robert Betts (on loan to Plymouth Argyle)

=== Reserve squad ===
The following players were contracted to Coventry, but did not appear for the first team this season.

Note: Flags indicate national team as defined under FIFA eligibility rules; some limited exceptions apply. Players may hold more than one non-FIFA nationality.

No.	Pos.	Nation	Player
20	MF	SWE	Tomas Gustafsson
23	GK	DEN	Morten Hyldgaard
29	FW	NOR	Runar Normann
30	MF	BEL	Laurent Delorge
31	FW	HON	Jairo Martínez
33	FW	ENG	Gary McSheffrey
35	MF	ENG	Craig Pead
36	MF	WAL	Lee Fowler
37	MF	SCO	Craig Strachan
38	DF	ENG	Thomas Cudworth

No.	Pos.	Nation	Player
39	DF	SWE	Richard Spong
40	MF	SCO	Gary McPhee
50	GK	SWE	Per Fahlman
—	GK	ENG	Gary Montgomery
—	DF	WAL	David Pipe
—	MF	ENG	Chris Barnett
—	MF	SWE	Andreas Dahl
—	MF	SCO	Martin Grant
—	MF	NIR	Mark Magennis

== Transfers ==
=== In ===
Date	Pos	Name	From	Fee	Notes
12 July 2000	FW	(England) Jay Bothroyd	(England) Arsenal	£1,000,000	
2 August 2000	MF	(England) David Thompson	(England) Liverpool	£2,500,000	
16 August 2000	FW	(Wales) Craig Bellamy	(England) Norwich City	£6,500,000	
6 September 2000	FW	(Honduras) Jairo Martínez	(Honduras) Motagua	Signed	
19 October 2000	MF	(Honduras) Iván Guerrero	(Honduras) Motagua	Signed	
1 December 2000	MF	(Republic of Ireland) Lee Carsley	(England) Blackburn Rovers	£2,500,000	
22 December 2000	MF	(Sweden) Andreas Dahl	(Sweden) IFK Hässleholm	£300,000	
8 February 2001	FW	(Wales) John Hartson	(England) Wimbledon	Signed	

=== Out ===
Date	Pos	Name	To	Fee	Notes
9 June 2000	FW	(England) Chukki Eribenne	(England) Bournemouth	Free transfer	
28 June 2000	DF	(England) David Burrows	(England) Birmingham City	Free transfer	
1 July 2000	MF	(Scotland) Gary McAllister	(England) Liverpool	Free transfer	
5 July 2000	DF	(England) Ian Brightwell	(England) Walsall	Free transfer	
6 July 2000	DF	(England) Mark Burrows	(England) Exeter City	Free transfer	
30 July 2000	FW	(Republic of Ireland) Robbie Keane	(Italy) Inter Milan	£13,000,000	
31 July 2000	FW	(England) Noel Whelan	(England) Middlesbrough	£2,000,000	
12 January 2001	MF	(Republic of Ireland) Daire Doyle	(England) Kidderminster Harriers	Free transfer	
13 February 2001	DF	(Scotland) Colin Hendry	(England) Bolton Wanderers	£250,000	
15 February 2001	FW	(Belgium) Cédric Roussel	(England) Wolverhampton Wanderers	£1,500,000	

Transfers in: ▼£12,800,000
Transfers out: ▲£16,750,000
Total spending: ▲£3,950,000

=== Loan in ===
- Alan Miller - Blackburn Rovers, 20 October, 37 days

=== Loan out ===
- Colin Hendry - Bolton Wanderers
- Robert Betts - Plymouth Argyle, 16 February, 19 days

== Statistics ==
=== Appearances and goals ===
No.	Pos	Nat	Player	Total		FA Premier League		FA Cup		League Cup	
No.	Pos	Nat	Player	Apps	Goals	Apps	Goals	Apps	Goals	Apps	Goals
Goalkeepers
1	GK	(Sweden) SWE	Magnus Hedman	18	0	15	0	1	0	2	0
13	GK	(England) ENG	Chris Kirkland	27	0	23	0	1	0	2+1	0
34	GK	(England) ENG	Alan Miller	1	0	0+1	0	0	0	0	0
Defenders
2	DF	(England) ENG	Marc Edworthy	28	1	18+6	1	2	0	2	0
4	DF	(England) ENG	Paul Williams	36	0	27+3	0	2	0	4	0
6	DF	(England) ENG	Richard Shaw	28	0	23+1	0	1	0	3	0
12	DF	(Scotland) SCO	Paul Telfer	35	0	27+4	0	1+1	0	2	0
17	DF	(Republic of Ireland) IRL	Gary Breen	37	1	29+2	1	2	0	2+2	0
19	DF	(Honduras) HON	Iván Guerrero	4	0	3	0	0	0	1	0
22	DF	(Republic of Ireland) IRL	Barry Quinn	29	0	25	0	2	0	2	0
24	DF	(England) ENG	Marcus Hall	24	1	21	0	1	0	2	1
26	DF	(Bosnia and Herzegovina) BIH	Muhamed Konjić	9	0	8	0	0	0	1	0
41	DF	(England) ENG	Calum Davenport	1	0	0+1	0	0	0	0	0
Midfielders
7	MF	(England) ENG	David Thompson	28	3	22+3	3	1	0	1+1	0
8	MF	(Morocco) MAR	Youssef Chippo	37	0	18+14	0	1	0	4	0
10	MF	(Morocco) MAR	Mustapha Hadji	34	7	28+1	6	1	1	3+1	0
14	MF	(England) ENG	Carlton Palmer	16	0	12+3	0	0	0	1	0
15	MF	(England) ENG	John Eustace	37	4	22+10	2	1	0	4	2
21	MF	(Scotland) SCO	Gavin Strachan	3	1	1	0	0	0	0+2	1
32	MF	(Republic of Ireland) IRL	Lee Carsley	23	2	21	2	2	0	0	0
37	MF	(Scotland) SCO	Craig Strachan	1	0	1	0	0	0	0	0
42	MF	(England) ENG	Robert Betts	1	0	0+1	0	0	0	0	0
Forwards
5	FW	(Wales) WAL	John Hartson	12	6	12	6	0	0	0	0
11	FW	(Peru) PER	Ysrael Zúñiga	17	2	7+8	1	0	0	2	1
16	FW	(Australia) AUS	John Aloisi	21	6	8+10	3	0	0	2+1	3
18	FW	(Wales) WAL	Craig Bellamy	39	8	33+1	6	2	1	3	1
28	FW	(England) ENG	Jay Bothroyd	10	0	3+5	0	1	0	0+1	0
Players transferred or loaned out during the season
5	DF	(Scotland) SCO	Colin Hendry	2	0	1+1	0	0	0	0	0
9	FW	(Belgium) BEL	Cédric Roussel	17	2	10+6	2	0	0	1	0

Last updated: 31 June 2002
Source: Competitions
