= Carpintero =

Carpintero is a Spanish surname:

- Santiago Carpintero Fernández
- Wilson Carpintero
- Los Carpinteros
