= David Coromina =

Spanish footballer (born 1974)

Personal information
- Full name: David Coromina Pararols
- Date of birth: 9 September 1974 (age 52)
- Place of birth: Santa Pau, Spain
- Height: 1.81 m (5 ft 11 in)
- Position: Right back

Youth career
- –1991: Barcelona

Senior career*
Years	Team	Apps	(Gls)
1991–1993	Olot	14	(0)
1993–1996	Barcelona C	92	(6)
1996–1997	Barcelona B	6	(0)
1997–1998	Gimnàstic de Tarragona	15	(0)
1998–2003	Palamós	44	(2)
2003–2004	Racing Santander	30	(0)
2004–2008	Deportivo Alavés	105	(2)
Total		306	(10)
- * Club domestic league appearances and goals as of 11 May 2021

David Coromina Pararols (born 9 September 1974) is a Spanish former footballer. Mainly a right back, he could also operate as a centre back or left back. He made 57 appearances in La Liga over one and a half seasons with Racing Santander, and one with Deportivo Alavés.

== Career ==
Coromina was born in Santa Pau, in the province of Girona and the autonomous community of Catalonia, and began his career in the youth department of Catalan giants Barcelona. He joined Tercera División side Olot for 1991–92, suffering relegation in his first season. He debuted for Barcelona C in 1993, and played a key role as they won promotion from the Tercera División in 1994–95. They were immediately relegated again the following year, but Coromina impressed enough to be given a chance with Barcelona B during the 1996–97 Segunda División campaign. After yet another relegation, he joined Segunda División B club Gimnàstic de Tarragona in the summer of 1997.

Coromina spent just one season with Nàstic before joining Palamós, also of the third tier, ahead of the 1998–99 season. After three seasons, Palamós finally returned to Segunda B after winning their Tercera División group in 2001–02. Palamós had been purchased in 1999 by Ukrainian-American businessman Dmitry Piterman, with whom Coromina's career would be linked from then on. Piterman bought a 24% stake in La Liga side Racing Santander in January 2003, and immediately signed Coromina for his new acquisition.

Coromina made his top flight debut on 2nd February, as Santander visited Estadio José Zorrilla, where they were beaten 2–1 by Real Valladolid. Piterman's next investment was purchasing 51% of Deportivo Alavés in July 2004, and Coromina was again one of his first signings, joining the same month. Coromina left Santander after 30 La Liga appearances in a season and a half.

Coromina helped Alavés return to the top flight in his first season with the club, and made 27 appearances in 2005–06 as they were immediately relegated again. During a turbulent 2006–07 campaign, in which Alavés employed no fewer than six managers, he played 20 matches. He spent one further season with Alavés, before retiring in 2008, shortly before his 34th birthday.

== Honours ==
Palamós

- Tercera División: 2001–02

== Career statistics ==
As of 13 May 2021

Club	Season	League			Cup		Europe		Total	
Club	Season	Division	Apps	Goals	Apps	Goals	Apps	Goals	Apps	Goals
UE Olot	1991–92	Tercera División	14	0	–		–		14	0
Barcelona C	1993–94	Tercera División	35	3	–		–		35	3
Barcelona C	1994–95	Tercera División	32	1	–		–		32	1
Barcelona C	1995–96	Segunda División B	24	2	–		–		24	2
Barcelona C	1996–97	Tercera División	1	0	–		–		1	0
Barcelona C	Total		92	6	0	0	0	0	92	6
Barcelona B	1996–97	Segunda División	6	0	–		–		6	0
Gimnàstic de Tarragona	1997–98	Segunda División B	15	0	0	0	–		15	0
Palamós	1998–99	Segunda División B	27	1	2	0	–		29	1
Palamós	2002–03	Segunda División B	17	1	4	0	–		21	1
Palamós	Total		44	2	6	0	0	0	50	2
Racing Santander	2002–03	La Liga	16	0	0	0	–		16	0
Racing Santander	2003–04	La Liga	14	0	2	0	4	1	20	1
Racing Santander	Total		30	0	2	0	4	1	36	1
Deportivo Alavés	2004–05	Segunda División	33	0	1	0	–		34	0
Deportivo Alavés	2005–06	La Liga	27	0	1	0	–		28	0
Deportivo Alavés	2006–07	Segunda División	20	0	3	0	–		23	0
Deportivo Alavés	2007–08	Segunda División	25	2	2	0	–		27	2
Deportivo Alavés	Total		105	2	7	0	0	0	112	2
Career total			306	10	15	0	4	1	325	11

1. Appearances in the 2003 UEFA Intertoto Cup
