= John Aloisi =

Australian soccer player and manager

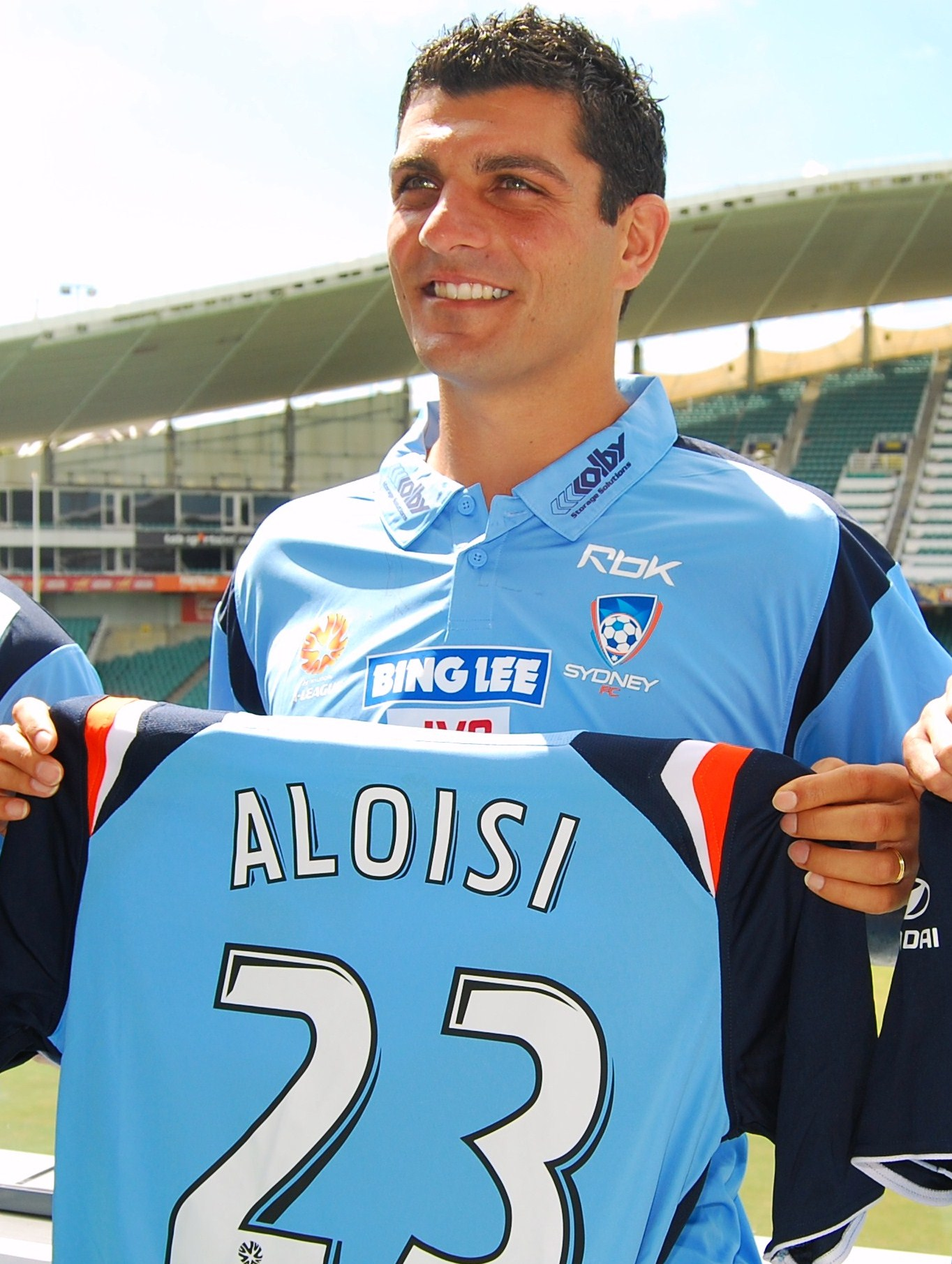
- Aloisi in 2008

Personal information
- Full name: John Aloisi
- Date of birth: 5 February 1976 (age 50)
- Place of birth: Adelaide, South Australia
- Height: 1.85 m (6 ft 1 in)
- Position: Striker

Youth career
- Rostrevor College
- Adelaide City
- AIS

Senior career*
Years	Team	Apps	(Gls)
1991–1992	Adelaide City	1	(0)
1992–1993	Standard Liège	0	(0)
1993–1995	Antwerp	35	(7)
1995–1997	Cremonese	48	(4)
1997–1998	Portsmouth	60	(26)
1998–2001	Coventry City	41	(10)
2001–2005	Osasuna	121	(29)
2005–2007	Alavés	58	(16)
2007–2008	Central Coast Mariners	15	(7)
2008–2010	Sydney FC	40	(12)
2010–2011	Melbourne Heart	20	(8)
Total		439	(119)

International career
1992	Australia U20	6	(1)
2004	Australia Olympic (O.P.)	7	(3)
1997–2008	Australia	55	(27)

Managerial career
- 2012–2013: Melbourne Heart
- 2015–2018: Brisbane Roar
- 2021–2026: Western United
- 2026: Chengdu Rongcheng
Medal record
Representing Australia
Men's Association football
FIFA Confederations Cup
Runner-up	1997 Saudi Arabia
Third place	2001 South Korea-Japan
OFC Nations Cup
Winner	2004 Australia
AFC–OFC Challenge Cup
Runner-up	2001 Japan
- * Club domestic league appearances and goals

John Aloisi (/ˌæloʊˈiːsiː/; born 5 February 1976) is an Australian soccer coach and former player who was most recently head coach of Chinese Super League club Chengdu Rongcheng. In a playing career that spanned 20 seasons, he was the first Australian ever to play and score in La Liga, the Premier League and Serie A.

Aloisi returned to Australia in 2007, with four seasons in the A-League. Aloisi was an integral member of the Australia national team for more than a decade, and represented the nation at the 2006 World Cup, being an essential figure in the qualifying stages. He also appeared for the Socceroos in two Confederations Cups. A former striker, Aloisi was described as a goal poacher who was able to "hold the ball up well and create opportunities for his teammates."

== Club career ==
=== Early years and England ===
Born in Adelaide, South Australia, Aloisi attended Rostrevor College (92'). Aloisi arrived from Adelaide City in Europe aged 16. He signed with Belgian club Standard Liège. He did not appear in any official games for the club, and played sparingly for his next team, fellow top division outfit Royal Antwerp F.C.

Then in November 1995, Aloisi signed for Italian side US Cremonese and on the 25th, after two minutes on the pitch, he scored in a 2–1 home win against Calcio Padova, becoming the youngest foreign player ever to score in a Serie A match. By the time he departed Lombardy, they suffered two consecutive relegations.

Aloisi arrived in English football early in the 1997–98 season, signing for Portsmouth in the Division One, under the chairmanship of Australia national football team manager Terry Venables. He scored 12 goals in his first season in England as Portsmouth narrowly avoided relegation, bettering that total to 13 in the following campaign.

On 17 December 1998, Aloisi moved to the Premier League with Coventry City, who paid £650,000 for his services. He made his Sky Blues debut in a 1–1 home draw against Derby County, appearing as a late substitute; also coming from the bench, he netted in the next match, 1–1 against Tottenham Hotspur.

Aloisi scored twice in a 4–1 win against Aston Villa at Villa Park, which was Coventry's first ever away victory in the league against their West Midlands rivals on 27 February 1999. Starting in the next game, against Charlton Athletic, he was sent off for retaliating after Danny Mills shoulder barged him in the back, receiving a standard three match ban for a straight red card. For Portsmouth and Coventry combined, he finished the season with 18 goals.

Coventry went down at the end of the 2000–01 season after a 34-year top flight stay, with Aloisi scoring three times from eight starts and ten substitute appearances. He scored a hat-trick against Preston North End in the season's Football League Cup – 4–1 home win, 7–2 on aggregate). In June, he was allowed to leave Highfield Road, and came close to signing for Crystal Palace, but nothing came of it.

=== Spain ===
In 2001, Aloisi moved to Spain, joining Pamplona's CA Osasuna. He scored nine goals in 30 games in his first season in La Liga, being regularly used during his four-year spell in Navarre. On 11 April 2004, he played the full 90 minutes in a 3–0 away win against Real Madrid and, on 11 June of the following year, he netted in the Copa del Rey final, equalising in an eventual 1–2 extra time loss against Real Betis.

After a move to Panathinaikos F.C. collapsed, Aloisi signed for another Spanish outfit, Deportivo Alavés, on a free transfer. He scored ten goals in 2005–06, his best Spanish total, but the Basque team suffered top flight relegation.

=== Return to Australia ===
On 20 October 2007, it was announced that Aloisi had signed with the Central Coast Mariners FC for the remainder of the season. The team was able to not include his wages in the salary cap due to a loop hole relating to injured players. He made his debut in the A-League on the 28th against Sydney FC, in a 2–3 defeat.

On 3 March 2008, after failing to re-sign with the Mariners, Aloisi penned a two-year deal with Sydney FC, for an undisclosed fee reported to be $1.4 million a season, making him the highest-paid player based in Australia in any of the four football codes. He made his debut as a second-half substitute against Perth Glory FC at the Sydney Football Stadium, and scored his first goal for Sydney in a 2–0 upset win over archrivals Melbourne Victory FC.

On 18 February 2009, 33-year-old Aloisi was linked with a loan move to Shanghai Shenhua F.C. in China. He soon decided against the deal, opting instead to spend the entire pre-season with Sydney FC, under the club's new coach Vítězslav Lavička. He scored twice in a friendly with the Newcastle United Jets FC, and eventually started repaying the faith the team had in him by scoring a double in a 3–2 win against North Queensland Fury FC in Townsville, in the first game of the season; he finished the campaign – winning both the minor and the major championships – as the first Sydney player ever to reach double digits in a single season.

On 29 March 2010, Melbourne Heart FC signed Aloisi on a free transfer. He impressed at the new club and scored eight goals, including three against rivals Melbourne Victory, both the first goal ever in a Melbourne derby, and a brace which equalised the game at 2–2 after the Heart had been 2–0 down. On 12 February 2011, he played the final game of his career against former team Sydney FC, in the last round of the A-League season, scoring and being replaced by in the 83rd minute by Kristian Sarkies, to a standing ovation from the home crowd.

== International career ==
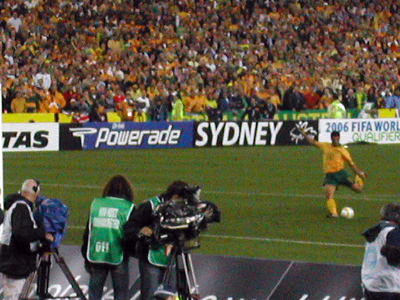
Aloisi taking the penalty that secured the victory over Uruguay and Australia's place in the 2006 World Cup.

Aloisi made his debut for the Australian national team in 1997. Also in that year, he was selected to the FIFA Confederations Cup, scoring in a 3–1 group stage win against Mexico for the eventual runners-up.

After representing Australia at the 2004 Summer Olympics as one of the three overage players, scoring three goals in an eventual quarterfinal exit, Aloisi finished second in the scoring charts at the 2005 Confederations Cup, netting braces against Germany and Argentina as the Socceroos did not manage one single point in three games.

On 16 November 2005, Aloisi scored the decisive penalty against Uruguay in the 2006 FIFA World Cup playoffs, after a 1–1 aggregate tie. That goal meant Australia qualified to the FIFA World Cup for the first time since 1974. He was selected in the squad for the final stages in Germany and, on 12 June, came off the bench to score the third goal in a 3–1 group stage victory against Japan, thus becoming only the second Australian to score a goal at the World Cup finals, after teammate Tim Cahill.

On 21 July 2007, Aloisi scored in the 2007 AFC Asian Cup's quarterfinal match against Japan (1–1), in an eventual penalty shootout exit in Australia's first ever participation in that tournament. It would be the last of his 27 international goals, second-best behind Damian Mori at the time of his retirement.

After his return to the A-League, Aloisi ceased to be recalled by the national team. In early 2008, his penalty kick against Uruguay which took the Socceroos to the 2006 World Cup was voted by the Sport Australia Hall of Fame as one of three greatest moments in Australian sporting history.

== Coaching career ==
=== Melbourne Heart ===
After retiring, Aloisi started a coaching career, being appointed youth manager at Melbourne Heart. On 8 May 2012, it was announced that he had accepted a three-year contract to be the manager of Melbourne Heart. On 5 October 2012, he got his first win as manager as Melbourne Heart beat rivals Melbourne Victory 2–1. Aloisi struggled in his first season as head coach, with Melbourne Heart coming ninth in the 2012–13 season and winning only one away game all season. The 2013–14 season did not start any better with the Heart managing 0 wins, 4 draws and 6 losses from 10 starts. On 28 December 2013, Aloisi was sacked as the manager of Melbourne Heart following the club's seventeenth competitive match without a win.

=== Melbourne Victory ===
On 9 February 2015, Aloisi joined Melbourne Victory FC as the development coach of its National Youth League and National Premier League sides.

=== Brisbane Roar ===
On 26 May 2015, Aloisi was named manager of Brisbane Roar. In both of his first two seasons at the club, the Roar achieved a top 4 finish in the league, and made it to the semi-finals.

In May 2017, Aloisi signed a new three-year contract to stay on as manager of Brisbane.

On 28 December 2018, Aloisi resigned as manager of Brisbane Roar following the club's poor start to the season, with the Roar second-last on the A-League ladder with just 1 win in 9 matches at the time of his departure. He left as Brisbane Roar's longest serving manager.

=== Western United ===
In July 2021, Aloisi was appointed as head coach of Western United, signing a two-year contract.

In May 2022, Aloisi guided Western United to the A-League Championship, with a 2–0 win over defending champions Melbourne City. The championship win saw Western United became just the second expansion side ever to win the A-League Championship, the quickest expansion side to win the championship, the first team since to triumph in their first grand final appearance since Brisbane Roar in 2011, and one of just two teams to have won the championship after finishing outside the top two, with Melbourne Victory first achieving this feat in 2018. Aloisi has been credited for overhauling the club's culture, which saw the club go from 10th place the previous season to champions the next season.

=== Chengdu Rongcheng ===
On 6 January 2026, Aloisi was appointed as head coach of Chengdu Rongcheng.

== Personal life ==
Aloisi is of Italian descent through his grandparents, who are from Calabria. His older brother Ross, was also a professional footballer, and has served under him as an assistant coach.

A devout Catholic, Aloisi is married to Angela and has daughters: Alisia, Katia and Amaya.

Aloisi appeared on the cover of the Australian version of Pro Evolution Soccer 6.

In addition to his native English, Aloisi also speaks Italian and Spanish.

In 2020, Aloisi successfully underwent surgery to fix a tear in his mitral valve.

== Career statistics ==
=== Club ===
Appearances and goals by club, season and competition
Club	Season	League			National cup (Note: Includes Belgian Cup, Coppa Italia, FA Cup, Copa del Rey)		Continental		Total	
Club	Season	Division	Apps	Goals	Apps	Goals	Apps	Goals	Apps	Goals
Adelaide City	1991–92	National Soccer League	20	8	–		–		20	8
Adelaide City	1991–92	National Soccer League	1	0	–		–		1	0
Adelaide City	Total		21	8	–		–		21	8
Standard Liège	1992–93	Belgian Pro League	0	0	1	0	1 (Note: Appearance in UEFA Cup)	0	2	0
Antwerp	1993–94	Belgian Pro League	10	1	1	0	–		11	1
Antwerp	1994–95	Belgian Pro League	25	6	2	2	–		27	8
Antwerp	Total		35	7	3	2	–		38	9
Cremonese	1995–96	Serie A	22	2	0	0	–		22	2
Cremonese	1996–97	Serie B	26	2	3	1	–		29	3
Cremonese	Total		48	4	3	1	–		51	5
Portsmouth	1997–98	First Division	38	12	3	0	–		41	12
Portsmouth	1998–99	First Division	22	14	4	3	–		26	17
Portsmouth	Total		60	26	7	3	–		67	29
Coventry City	1998–99	Premier League	16	5	2	0	–		18	5
Coventry City	1999–2000	Premier League	7	2	0	0	–		7	2
Coventry City	2000–01	Premier League	19	3	3	3	–		22	6
Coventry City	Total		42	10	5	3	–		47	13
Osasuna	2001–02	La Liga	30	9	0	0	–		30	9
Osasuna	2002–03	La Liga	32	8	2	1	–		34	9
Osasuna	2003–04	La Liga	33	5	3	2	–		36	7
Osasuna	2004–05	La Liga	26	6	6	2	–		32	8
Osasuna	Total		121	28	11	5	–		132	33
Alavés	2005–06	La Liga	33	10	1	0	–		34	10
Alavés	2006–07	Segunda División	25	6	1	0	–		26	6
Alavés	Total		58	16	2	0	–		60	16
CC Mariners	2007–08	A-League	15	7	0	0	–		15	7
Sydney	2008–09	A-League	16	2	3	2	–		19	4
Sydney	2009–10	A-League	24	10	0	0	–		24	10
Sydney	Total		40	12	3	2	–		43	14
Melbourne Heart	2010–11	A-League	20	8	–		–		20	8
Career total			462	126	37	17	1	0	499	143

=== International ===
Appearances and goals by national team and year
National team	Year	Apps	Goals
Australia	1997	11	7
Australia	1998	1	0
Australia	1999	0	0
Australia	2000	2	1
Australia	2001	10	7
Australia	2002	0	0
Australia	2003	2	0
Australia	2004	5	2
Australia	2005	8	5
Australia	2006	10	4
Australia	2007	5	1
Australia	2008	1	0
Total		55	27

Scores and results list Australia's goal tally first, score column indicates score after each Aloisi goal.

List of international goals scored by John Aloisi
No.	Date	Venue	Opponent	Score	Result	Competition
1	11 June 1997	Parramatta Stadium, Sydney, Australia	Solomon Islands	3–0	13–0	1998 FIFA World Cup qualification
2	11 June 1997	Parramatta Stadium, Sydney, Australia	Solomon Islands	5–0	13–0	1998 FIFA World Cup qualification
3	11 June 1997	Parramatta Stadium, Sydney, Australia	Solomon Islands	10–0	13–0	1998 FIFA World Cup qualification
4	11 June 1997	Parramatta Stadium, Sydney, Australia	Solomon Islands	11–0	13–0	1998 FIFA World Cup qualification
5	11 June 1997	Parramatta Stadium, Sydney, Australia	Solomon Islands	12–0	13–0	1998 FIFA World Cup qualification
6	28 June 1997	North Harbour Stadium, Auckland, New Zealand	New Zealand	1–0	3–0	1998 FIFA World Cup qualification
7	12 December 1997	King Fahd II Stadium, Riyadh, Saudi Arabia	Mexico	2–0	3–1	1997 FIFA Confederations Cup
8	4 October 2000	Al Maktoum Stadium, Dubai, United Arab Emirates	Kuwait	1–0	1–0	2000 Friendship Tournament
9	9 April 2001	Coffs Harbour International Stadium, Coffs Harbour, Australia	Tonga	3–0	22–0	2002 FIFA World Cup qualification
10	9 April 2001	Coffs Harbour International Stadium, Coffs Harbour, Australia	Tonga	6–0	22–0	2002 FIFA World Cup qualification
11	9 April 2001	Coffs Harbour International Stadium, Coffs Harbour, Australia	Tonga	8–0	22–0	2002 FIFA World Cup qualification
12	9 April 2001	Coffs Harbour International Stadium, Coffs Harbour, Australia	Tonga	10–0	22–0	2002 FIFA World Cup qualification
13	9 April 2001	Coffs Harbour International Stadium, Coffs Harbour, Australia	Tonga	11–0	22–0	2002 FIFA World Cup qualification
14	9 April 2001	Coffs Harbour International Stadium, Coffs Harbour, Australia	Tonga	14–0	22–0	2002 FIFA World Cup qualification
15	24 June 2001	Stadium Australia, Sydney, Australia	New Zealand	3–1	4–1	2002 FIFA World Cup qualification
16	4 June 2004	Hindmarsh Stadium, Adelaide, Australia	Vanuatu	1–0	3–0	2004 OFC Nations Cup
17	4 June 2004	Hindmarsh Stadium, Adelaide, Australia	Vanuatu	3–0	3–0	2004 OFC Nations Cup
18	15 June 2005	Commerzbank-Arena, Frankfurt, Germany	Germany	2–2	3–4	2005 FIFA Confederations Cup
19	15 June 2005	Commerzbank-Arena, Frankfurt, Germany	Germany	3–4	3–4	2005 FIFA Confederations Cup
20	18 June 2005	Frankenstadion, Nuremberg, Germany	Argentina	1–3	2–4	2005 FIFA Confederations Cup
21	18 June 2005	Frankenstadion, Nuremberg, Germany	Argentina	2–3	2–4	2005 FIFA Confederations Cup
22	9 October 2005	Craven Cottage, London England	Jamaica	4–0	5–0	Friendly
23	7 June 2006	Donaustadion, Ulm, Germany	Liechtenstein	3–1	3–1	Friendly
24	12 June 2006	Fritz-Walter-Stadion, Kaiserslautern, Germany	Japan	3–1	3–1	2006 FIFA World Cup
25	11 October 2006	Sydney Football Stadium, Sydney, Australia	Bahrain	1–0	2–0	2007 AFC Asian Cup Qualification
26	14 November 2006	Loftus Road, London England	Ghana	1–0	1–1	Friendly
27	21 July 2007	Mỹ Đình National Stadium, Hà Nội, Vietnam	Japan	1–0	1–1	2007 AFC Asian Cup

== Managerial statistics ==
As of match played 8 Nov 2026

Managerial record by team and tenure
Team	From	To	Record					Ref.
Team	From	To	G	W	D	L	Win %	Ref.
Melbourne Heart	8 May 2012	28 December 2013	39	8	7	24	20.51	
Brisbane Roar	26 May 2015	28 December 2018	108	41	24	43	37.96	
Western United	15 July 2021	5 January 2026	121	51	22	48	42.15	
Chengdu Rongcheng	6 January 2026	10 November 2026	34	16	7	11	47.06	
Career Total			302	116	60	126	38.41	

== Honours ==
=== Player ===
Adelaide City

- NSL championship: 1991–92

Osasuna

- Copa del Rey runner-up: 2004–05

Central Coast Mariners

- A-League premiership: 2007–08

Sydney FC

- A-League premiership: 2009–10
- A-League championship: 2010

Australia

- FIFA Confederations Cup: runner-up, 1997; 3rd place, 2001
- OFC Nations Cup: 2004
- AFC–OFC Challenge Cup: runner-up 2001

Individual

- FIFA Confederations Cup Bronze Shoe: 2005
- 2025 Stadium Australia Hall of Fame inductee

=== Manager ===
Western United

- A-League championship: 2022
