= Pablo Cavallero =

Argentine footballer

Personal information
- Full name: Pablo Oscar Cavallero
- Date of birth: 13 April 1974 (age 52)
- Place of birth: Lomas de Zamora, Argentina
- Height: 1.83 m (6 ft 0 in)
- Position: Goalkeeper

Youth career
- Vélez Sarsfield

Senior career*
| Years | Team | Apps | (Gls) |
| 1995–1998 | Vélez Sarsfield | 15 | (0) |
| 1998–1999 | → Unión Santa Fe (loan) | 34 | (0) |
| 1999–2000 | Espanyol | 26 | (0) |
| 2000–2004 | Celta | 121 | (0) |
| 2005–2008 | Levante | 43 | (0) |
| 2008–2009 | Peñarol | 15 | (0) |
| Total | | 254 | (0) |

International career
| 1996 | Argentina Olympic | 4 | (0) |
| 1996–2004 | Argentina | 26 | (0) |
Medal record
Representing Argentina
Men's Football
| Silver medal – second place | 1996 Atlanta | Team competition |
- * Club domestic league appearances and goals

Pablo Oscar Cavallero (born 13 April 1974) is an Argentine former footballer who played as a goalkeeper.

Nine years of his professional career were spent in Spain, mainly with Celta. He appeared in 152 La Liga matches over eight seasons.

An Argentina international for eight years, Cavallero played with his country in two World Cups and the 2004 Copa América.

== Club career ==
Cavallero was born in Lomas de Zamora, Buenos Aires Province. During his professional career he played for Club Atlético Vélez Sarsfield – being second-choice to Paraguayan José Luis Chilavert for most of his tenure– Unión de Santa Fe, RCD Espanyol, RC Celta de Vigo and Levante UD (the last three in Spain's La Liga). With the last club, he also competed in the Segunda División, appearing in 38 games out of a possible 42 in the 2005–06 season as it returned to the top flight.

In his four-year spell with Celta, Cavallero won the Ricardo Zamora Trophy in 2002–03 as the Galician team qualified for the UEFA Champions League having finished fourth. He allowed 27 goals in 34 matches, a goals-per-match average of 0.79.

Cavallero then moved to Uruguay with Primera División side Peñarol, retiring in 2009 at the age of 35.

== International career ==
Cavallero won 26 caps for Argentina in an eight-year span, and was a participant at the 1996 Summer Olympics, helping the national team win silver, and the 1998 and the 2002 FIFA World Cups, starting in the latter ahead of Roberto Bonano and Germán Burgos.

== Career statistics ==
=== Club ===
Appearances and goals by club, season and competition
| Club | Season | League | | | Cup | | Continental | | Total | |
| Club | Season | Division | Apps | Goals | Apps | Goals | Apps | Goals | Apps | Goals |
|---|---|---|---|---|---|---|---|---|---|---|
| Vélez Sarsfield | 1996–97 | Argentine Primera División | 14 | 0 | — | | — | | 14 | 0 |
| Vélez Sarsfield | 1997–98 | Argentine Primera División | 1 | 0 | — | | — | | 1 | 0 |
| Vélez Sarsfield | Total | | 15 | 0 | — | | — | | 15 | 0 |
| Unión Santa Fe (loan) | 1998–99 | Argentine Primera División | 34 | 0 | — | | — | | 34 | 0 |
| Espanyol | 1999–2000 | La Liga | 26 | 0 | 5 | 0 | 0 | 0 | 31 | 0 |
| Celta | 2000–01 | La Liga | 21 | 0 | 5 | 0 | 6 (Note: Appearances in UEFA Cup) | 0 | 32 | 0 |
| Celta | 2001–02 | La Liga | 32 | 0 | 0 | 0 | 1 | 0 | 33 | 0 |
| Celta | 2002–03 | La Liga | 36 | 0 | 0 | 0 | 0 | 0 | 36 | 0 |
| Celta | 2003–04 | La Liga | 32 | 0 | 1 | 0 | 6 (Note: Appearances in UEFA Champions League) | 0 | 39 | 0 |
| Celta | Total | | 121 | 0 | 1 | 0 | 13 | 0 | 135 | 0 |
| Levante | 2004–05 | La Liga | 0 | 0 | 0 | 0 | — | | 0 | 0 |
| Levante | 2005–06 | Segunda División | 38 | 0 | 1 | 0 | — | | 39 | 0 |
| Levante | 2006–07 | La Liga | 5 | 0 | 0 | 0 | — | | 5 | 0 |
| Levante | Total | | 43 | 0 | 1 | 0 | — | | 44 | 0 |
| Peñarol | 2008–09 | Uruguayan Primera División | 15 | 0 | — | | 2 (Note: Appearances in Copa Libertadores) | 0 | 17 | 0 |
| Career total | | | 254 | 0 | 13 | 0 | 14 | 0 | 281 | 1 |

=== International ===
Appearances and goals by national team and year
| National team | Year | Apps | Goals |
|---|---|---|---|
| Argentina | 1996 | 2 | 0 |
| Argentina | 1997 | 0 | 0 |
| Argentina | 1998 | 2 | 0 |
| Argentina | 1999 | 0 | 0 |
| Argentina | 2000 | 1 | 0 |
| Argentina | 2001 | 2 | 0 |
| Argentina | 2002 | 5 | 0 |
| Argentina | 2003 | 9 | 0 |
| Argentina | 2004 | 5 | 0 |
| Total | | 26 | 0 |

== Honours ==
Vélez

- Argentine Primera División: 1996 Clausura, 1998 Clausura
- Supercopa Sudamericana: 1996
- Recopa Sudamericana: 1997

Espanyol

- Copa del Rey: 1999–2000

Argentina

- Summer Olympic Games: Silver medal 1996

Individual

- Ricardo Zamora Trophy: 2002–03
