= Nicolas Ardouin =

French footballer (born 1978)

Personal information
- Full name: Nicolas Ardouin
- Date of birth: 7 February 1978 (age 48)
- Place of birth: La Rochelle, France
- Height: 1.85 m (6 ft 1 in)
- Position: Goalkeeper

Senior career*
Years	Team	Apps	(Gls)
1999–2000	Grenoble	18	(0)
2000–2002	La Roche-sur-Yon	71	(0)
2002–2004	Valence	18	(0)
2004–2008	Alavés	15	(0)
2008–2009	Tubize	29	(0)
2009–2013	Stade Bordelais		
- * Club domestic league appearances and goals

Nicolas Ardouin (born 7 February 1978) is a French former professional footballer who played as a goalkeeper.

== Career ==
Ardouin was born in La Rochelle, Charente-Maritime. His first years in professional football were spent in the lower leagues, first with Grenoble Foot 38 then La Roche VF. In 2002, he moved to level two with ASOA Valence, but only amassed 18 matches in two seasons combined.

In 2004–05, Ardouin moved abroad with Deportivo Alavés, again only being backup. In his second season, as the Basque had returned to La Liga, he was as low as third-string, behind Argentine Franco Costanzo and Roberto Bonano, and did not appear at all.

Ardouin moved countries again in 2008, joining A.F.C. Tubize in Belgium. He had his most solid campaign as a professional, but the club was finally relegated.
