= Poli (footballer) =

Spanish footballer

Personal information
- Full name: Hipólito Fernández Serrano
- Date of birth: 20 March 1977 (age 49)
- Place of birth: Seville, Spain
- Height: 1.83 m (6 ft 0 in)
- Position: Left-back

Youth career
- Betis

Senior career*
Years	Team	Apps	(Gls)
1996–1997	Betis B	36	(3)
1997–2002	Extremadura	166	(4)
2002–2005	Mallorca	96	(0)
2005–2006	Alavés	9	(0)
2006–2011	Recreativo	77	(0)
Total		384	(7)
- * Club domestic league appearances and goals

Hipólito Fernández Serrano (born 20 March 1977), known as Poli, is a Spanish former professional footballer who played as a left-back.

He played 191 games in La Liga over eight seasons, mainly with Mallorca and Recreativo (three years apiece). He added 157 matches and four goals in the Segunda División.

== Club career ==
Poli was born in Seville, Andalusia. After making his professional debut with CF Extremadura in the Segunda División he moved in 2002, alongside teammate David Cortés, to RCD Mallorca, where they were the starting full-backs for three La Liga seasons.

In 2005–06, Poli signed for fellow top-division club Deportivo Alavés, with little individual and team success (nine matches out of 38 for the player, relegation). In the following campaign he joined Recreativo de Huelva, recently promoted to the top tier.

With Recre, Poli was used mostly as a backup, although he started in the vast majority of his appearances, helping them to three consecutive top-flight seasons, with relegation befalling in 2009. Subsequently, he featured sparingly due to injury problems, retiring in June 2011 at the age of 34; he only played two league games in his last year.

== Honours ==
Mallorca

- Copa del Rey: 2002–03
