= Roberto Bonano =

Argentine footballer (born 1970)

Personal information
- Full name: Roberto Oscar Bonano
- Date of birth: 24 January 1970 (age 56)
- Place of birth: Rosario, Argentina
- Height: 1.86 m (6 ft 1 in)
- Position: Goalkeeper

Youth career
- Rosario Central

Senior career*
Years	Team	Apps	(Gls)
1991–1996	Rosario Central	110	(0)
1996–2001	River Plate	104	(1)
2001–2003	Barcelona	51	(0)
2004	Murcia	11	(0)
2004–2008	Alavés	56	(0)
Total		332	(1)

International career
1989	Argentina U20	4	(0)
1996–2000	Argentina	13	(0)
- * Club domestic league appearances and goals

Roberto Oscar Bonano (born 24 January 1970) is an Argentine retired footballer who played as a goalkeeper.

Already in his 30s, he moved from River Plate to Spain where he spent the remainder of his 17-year professional career in representation of three teams, mainly Alavés.

Bonano earned 13 caps for Argentina, and was part of the squad at the 2002 World Cup.

== Club career ==
Born in Rosario, Santa Fe, Bonano represented in his native country Rosario Central and Club Atlético River Plate, winning several titles with the latter including five Argentine Primera División championships. In 2001, at 31, he moved to FC Barcelona, initially as first-choice; he made his La Liga debut on 26 August of that year, in a 2–1 away win against Sevilla FC.

After the emergence of Víctor Valdés from the Catalans' academy, however, Bonano was deemed surplus to requirements and signed with Real Murcia CF, joining Deportivo Alavés in the Segunda División in summer 2004 following his team's relegation. With the Basques, he was instrumental in a 2005 top-flight promotion but, the following campaign, acted second-fiddle to his compatriot Franco Costanzo who also played with him at River, as the season ended in relegation.

Bonano's last year at Alavés was highly turbulent, being suspended by the club's elusive chairman/owner/manager Dmitry Piterman after the latter had had a run-in with teammate Lluís Carreras. He retired at the season's close, aged 38.

== International career ==
Bonano represented Argentina at various youth levels. He made his senior debut on 28 December 1996, in a 3–2 friendly loss to Yugoslavia.

Bonano was subsequently picked up for the 2002 FIFA World Cup as a backup to Pablo Cavallero and Germán Burgos, and appeared in 13 matches for his country in four years.

== Coaching career ==
From 2011 to 2013, Bonano worked as assistant under Eduardo Berizzo, first with Estudiantes de La Plata then O'Higgins F.C. in Chile. Again in Spain, he was assistant and goalkeeper coach at Carreras' RCD Mallorca.

On 6 July 2015, Bonano reunited with his compatriot Berizzo, joining his staff at RC Celta de Vigo. Two years later, in the same capacity and under the same manager, he signed for Sevilla.

== Honours ==
Rosario Central

- Copa CONMEBOL: 1995

River Plate

- Argentine Primera División: Apertura 1996, Clausura 1997, Apertura 1997, Apertura 1999, Clausura 2000
- Copa Libertadores: 1996
- Supercopa Sudamericana: 1997
