= Santiago Carpintero =

Spanish footballer (born 1976)

Personal information
- Full name: Santiago Carpintero Fernández
- Date of birth: 28 September 1976 (age 50)
- Place of birth: León, Spain
- Height: 1.80 m (5 ft 11 in)
- Position: Midfielder

Senior career*
| Years | Team | Apps | (Gls) |
| 1993 | Cultural Leonesa | 1 | (0) |
| 1994–1997 | Oviedo B | 32 | (2) |
| 1997 | Manchego | 14 | (1) |
| 1998 | Albacete | 22 | (0) |
| 1998–2000 | Cartagonova | 48 | (3) |
| 2000–2002 | Toledo | 65 | (1) |
| 2002–2004 | Levante | 69 | (0) |
| 2004–2007 | Alavés | 81 | (5) |
| 2007–2008 | Málaga | 36 | (0) |
| 2008–2010 | Córdoba | 55 | (2) |
| Total | | 423 | (14) |
- * Club domestic league appearances and goals

Santiago Carpintero Fernández (born 28 September 1976 in León) is a Spanish former professional footballer who played as a midfielder.
