= Richard Spong =

Swedish footballer (born 1983)

Personal information
- Date of birth: 23 September 1983 (age 43)
- Place of birth: Falun, Sweden
- Height: 1.82 m (6 ft 0 in)
- Positions: Defender; midfielder

Youth career
- 1989–1996: IK Frej
- 1997–1998: IF Brommapojkarna

Senior career*
Years	Team	Apps	(Gls)
1998–1999	IF Brommapojkarna	1	(0)
1999–2003	Coventry City	0	(0)
2003–2004	Djurgårdens IF	2	(0)
2005–2008	IFK Norrköping	95	(2)
2009–2013	GAIS	48	(1)
2014–2019	IK Frej	92	(1)
Total		238	(4)

International career
2000–2001	Sweden U18	16	(0)
2001	Sweden U19	4	(0)
- * Club domestic league appearances and goals as of 30 July 2019

Richard Spong (born 23 September 1983) is a Swedish footballer who plays as a midfielder.

== Career ==
Spong began his career as a youth player with IK Frej and IF Brommapojkarna, before moving to England with Coventry City in 1999 where he didn't make a single first team appearance. He returned to Sweden in 2002 with Djurgårdens IF, later signing with IFK Norrköping in 2005. He signed for GAIS in the 2009 season.

== Honours ==
Djurgårdens IF

- Allsvenskan: 2003
