= Runar Normann =

Norwegian footballer (born 1978)

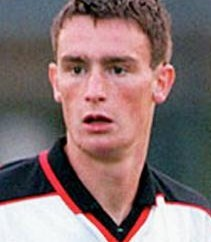

Personal information
- Full name: Runar Normann
- Date of birth: 1 March 1978 (age 48)
- Place of birth: Harstad, Norway
- Height: 1.80 m (5 ft 11 in)
- Position: Winger

Youth career
- 1996–1997: Harstad

Senior career*
Years	Team	Apps	(Gls)
1997–1999	Lillestrøm	40	(6)
1999–2003	Coventry City	13	(1)
2003	Brann	5	(0)
2003	Harstad		
2004	Vålerenga	4	(0)
2004	St.Hanshaugen		
2005	Tromsø	6	(0)
2006	Harstad		
2009	Tromsdalen UIL	10	(0)
2014	Harstad B		
2015–2016	Harstad		

International career
1995	Norway U17	2	(0)
1996	Norway U20	1	(0)
1999	Norway U21	3	(0)
- * Club domestic league appearances and goals

Runar Normann (born 1 March 1978) is a Norwegian former footballer who played as a winger.

== Club career ==
Normann was born in Harstad, Norway. He previously played for Lillestrøm, Coventry City (where he scored once against Sheffield Wednesday), Brann, Harstad (three times), Vålerenga, St. Hanshaugen, Tromsø and Tromsdalen UIL.

In August 2014 he made comeback for Harstad Reserves of the 5th tier of Norwegian football. In August 2015 he returned to Harstad first-team, of the 3rd tier.
