= Robert Betts =

English footballer

Personal information
- Date of birth: 21 December 1981 (age 44)
- Place of birth: Doncaster, England
- Position: Midfielder

Senior career*
Years	Team	Apps	(Gls)
1997–1998	Doncaster Rovers	3	(0)
1998–2003	Coventry City	13	(0)
2000–2001	→ Plymouth Argyle (loan)	4	(0)
2001–2002	→ Lincoln City (loan)	3	(0)
2003	Rochdale	5	(2)
2003–2004	Kidderminster Harriers	9	(0)
2004	Hereford United	8	(0)
2004–2005	Racing Club Warwick		
2004–2005	Forest Green Rovers	3	(0)
2004–2006	Racing Club Warwick		
2006–2008	Quorn		
- * Club domestic league appearances and goals as of 31 January 2013

Robert Betts (born 21 December 1981) is an English footballer who last played as a midfielder in non-league football. He played in the Premier League and Football League for Coventry City.

== Career ==
Betts made his debut for Doncaster Rovers when he was just 16, during the 1997–98 season, when a Doncaster side made up mostly of players from the youth team and non-league football were relegated from The Football League. He made 3 appearances that season, and impressed enough to earn a move to FA Premier League side Coventry City.

Here he settled into their youth system, appearing on the losing side in two FA Youth Cup Finals. He made a few appearances in the Premiership, and had loan spells at Plymouth Argyle and Lincoln City. Coventry's relegation from the Premiership in 2001 gave him more opportunities to play, but he was still on the fringes of the team, and was released on 22 May 2003. He scored once for Coventry; his goal coming in a League Cup tie against Rushden & Diamonds in October 2002.

The 2003–04 season saw Betts move between three clubs, having spells at Rochdale, Kidderminster Harriers, Hereford United. He was released by Hereford in the summer of 2004 and linked up with the Dr Martens League side Racing Club Warwick on non-contract terms. He soon secured a month's contract with Forest Green Rovers but this was not extended and, in October 2004, he rejoined Racing Club Warwick.

In the summer of 2006, the Racing Club Warwick manager Marcus Law was appointed manager of Quorn and Betts soon followed him. He won the Midland Football Alliance Player of the Season award for 2006–07. He was named caretaker manager in November 2007.
