= Craig Strachan (footballer) =

Scottish footballer

Personal information
- Full name: Craig Scott Strachan
- Date of birth: 19 May 1982 (age 44)
- Place of birth: Aberdeen, Scotland
- Height: 5 ft 8 in (1.73 m)
- Position: Midfielder

Senior career*
| Years | Team | Apps | (Gls) |
| 1999–2003 | Coventry City | 0 | (0) |
| 2003 | Rochdale | 1 | (0) |
| 2004–2006 | Halesowen Town | 12 | (1) |
| Total | | 14 | (1) |
- * Club domestic league appearances and goals

Craig Scott Strachan (born 19 May 1982) is a Scottish retired professional footballer who played as a defensive midfielder for Coventry City and Rochdale in the Football League.

He is the son of Gordon Strachan.
