= Tomas Antonelius =

Swedish footballer

Personal information
- Full name: Tomas Emil Rune Antonelius
- Birth name: Tomas Gustafsson
- Date of birth: 7 May 1973 (age 53)
- Place of birth: Stockholm, Sweden
- Height: 1.79 m (5 ft 10 1/2 in)
- Position: Defender

Senior career*
Years	Team	Apps	(Gls)
1991	Winnipeg Fury	14	(0)
1991–1996	Brommapojkarna	102	(4)
1996–1999	AIK	75	(2)
1999–2002	Coventry City	15	(0)
2002–2003	Copenhagen	27	(2)
Total		234	(6)

International career
1999–2002	Sweden	8	(0)
- * Club domestic league appearances and goals

Tomas Emil Rune Antonelius (né Gustafsson; 7 May 1973) is a Swedish former professional footballer who played as a defender. He played professionally in Sweden, Canada, England, and Denmark, before injuries cut his career short. He won eight caps for the Sweden national team between 1999 and 2002, and represented his country at UEFA Euro 2000 and the 2002 FIFA World Cup.

== Club career ==
=== Early career ===
Antonelius had a brief stint with Canadian side Winnipeg Fury, during a year in college in North America. Whilst at AIK, he played against Arsenal in the 1999–2000 UEFA Champions League. At the time, Arsenal were playing their home European games at Wembley Stadium, giving Antonelius a run out at the famous ground.

=== Coventry City ===
In December 1999, Antonelius joined Coventry City for an undisclosed fee, signing a three-and-a-half-year contract. He made his debut against Arsenal, coming on as a late substitute for Youssef Chippo, as Coventry won 3–2.

=== Copenhagen ===
In February 2002, he joined Danish Superliga side Copenhagen. However, he suffered a serious knee injury, 1.5 years after joining the club and never played football again. He announced his retirement in September 2003, due to this failure to recover from the injury.

== International career ==
Antonelius made his full international debut for the Sweden national team on 18 August 1999, in a friendly 0–0 draw with Austria. He made his competitive international debut for Sweden against Italy at UEFA Euro 2000, playing for 75 minutes before being replaced by Kennet Andersson in a 1–2 loss. He was also selected for the 2002 FIFA World Cup, but did not play. He won his eight and final cap on 12 October 2002 in a UEFA Euro 2004 qualifier against Hungary, playing for 67 minutes before being replaced by Mattias Jonson.

== Personal life ==
Antonelius began his career playing as "Tomas Gustafsson", before changing his name in 2001. The reason for this change was that "Gustafsson" is a very common name in Sweden, and he chose "Antonelius" as it was the married name of his older sister.

== Career statistics ==
=== International ===
Appearances and goals by national team and year
National team	Year	Apps	Goals
Sweden	1999	2	0
Sweden	2000	3	0
Sweden	2001	0	0
Sweden	2002	3	0
Total		8	0

== Honours ==
AIK

- Allsvenskan: 1998
- Svenska Cupen: 1996–97, 1998–99

Copenhagen

- Danish Superliga: 2002–03
