= Dmitry Piterman =

Ukrainian-American businessman (born 1963)

Dmitry Piterman (Ukrainian: Дмитро Пітерман; born 18 December 1963) is a Ukrainian-American businessman. He owned Spanish La Liga football clubs Racing de Santander and Deportivo Alavés in the 2000s.

== Early years ==
Piterman was born to a Jewish family in Odessa, in the Ukrainian Soviet Socialist Republic of the Soviet Union. Eight of his father's brothers were killed by the Nazis in World War II. At the age of 15 his family emigrated to the United States, settling in California where he attended college at UC Berkeley, excelling in sports – including triple jump, later narrowly failing qualification for the 1992 Summer Olympics in Barcelona.

== Football career ==
Piterman relocated to Spain in 1991, immediately buying two football clubs: amateurs Tossa Sport and fourth division side Palamós CF, with the latter promoting to the third level under his ownership in 2002. Three years earlier he had been elected club president and had his firsthand at coaching in spite of not being qualified to do so.

In January 2003, while still president at Palamós, Piterman bought 24% of Racing de Santander's shares, thus reaching La Liga. He insisted on being his team's manager, which granted him disciplinary action from the Royal Spanish Football Federation for being in the technical area, which he sometimes eluded by being accredited as a journalist or photographer. When criticised for wanting to manage the club despite a lack of experience and qualifications as such, he mentioned how George W. Bush was allowed to be in office as President of the United States.

After a brief spell in handball, also in Cantabria, Piterman bought a 51% controlling stake in Deportivo Alavés in July 2004, helping it return to the topflight in his first season, with Cos now acting as director of football. The American's spell in the Basque Country was also a rocky one, with three coaches being used during the 2005–06 campaign, which ended in relegation, the dismissals occurring when the managers refused to accept his interferences and impositions. Clashes also occurred with the club's players and fans alike. Piterman left a debt in the Alavés of more than 25 million euros (35 million USD), and fled the country leaving the team on the verge of bankruptcy.

The Cos/Piterman tandem appeared in 126 matches in Spanish football, winning 63, drawing 29 and losing 34. In 2006, he purchased a USL First Division franchise in San Francisco, California, the California Victory; it folded in one year, after he had already sold his stake of Alavés.
